= List of Stanford Cardinal football seasons =

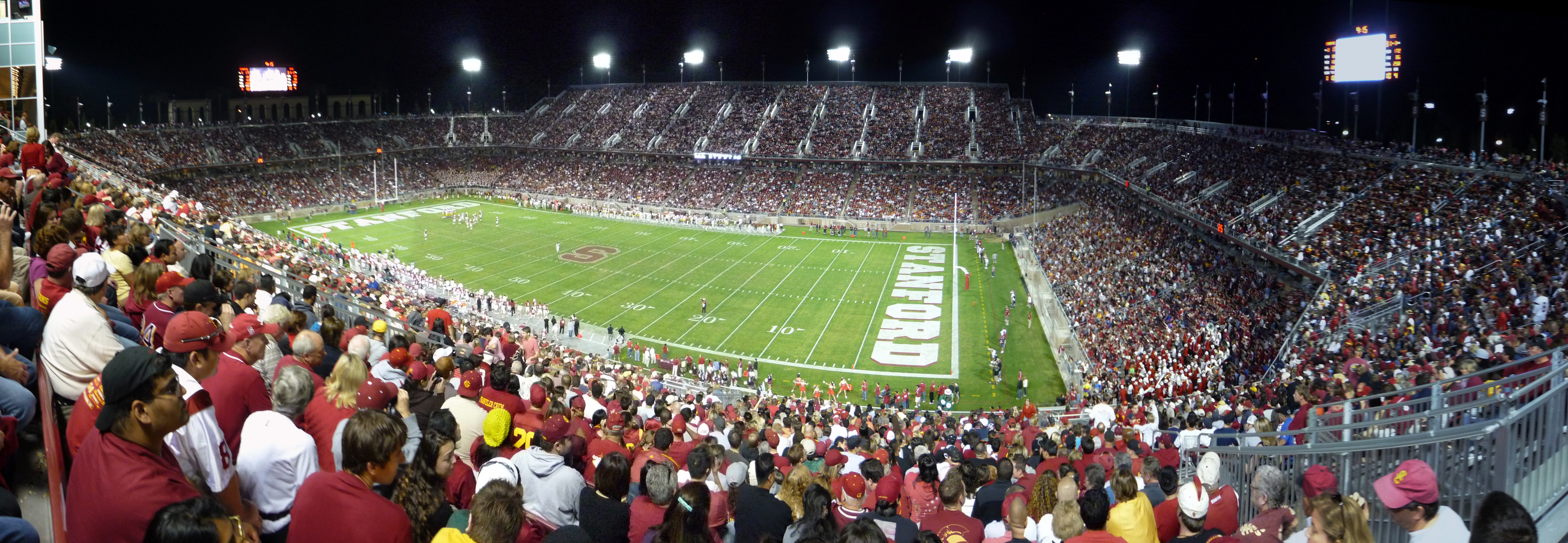
Stanford Stadium, where the Cardinal have played since 1923.

This is a list of seasons completed by the Stanford Cardinal football team of the National Collegiate Athletic Association (NCAA) Division I Football Bowl Subdivision (FBS).

Stanford has participated in more than 1,100 officially sanctioned games, including 27 bowl games and has fielded football teams since 1892 with a few exceptions: the school dropped football in favor of rugby from 1906 to 1917 and did not field a team in 1918 (due to World War I) or in 1943, 1944, and 1945 (due to World War II).

Stanford claims two national championships: in 1926 and 1940.

From its inception through the 1930 season, the team had no formal nickname. Beginning with the 1931 season, the team adopted the mascot "Indian." The Indian symbol and name were dropped in 1972 after objections from Native American students. From 1972 to 1981, the official nickname was "Cardinals," a reference to the color, not the bird. Prior to the 1982 season, the team adopted the singular form, "Cardinal."

== Seasons ==
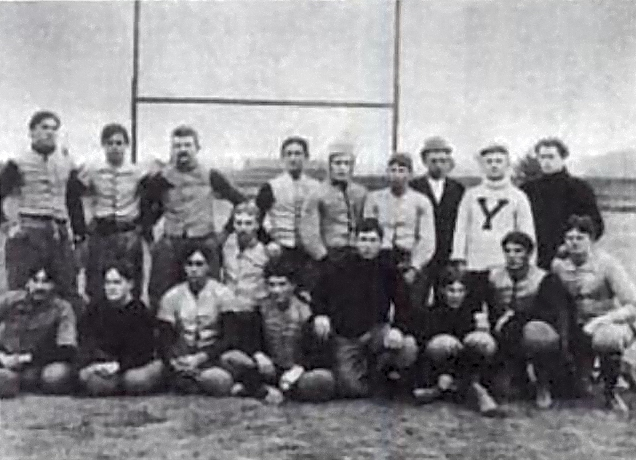
The 1893 Stanford football team

Year	Coach	Overall	Conference	Standing	Bowl/playoffs	Coaches^{#}	AP^{°}
Independent (1891)
1891	No coach	3–1					
Walter Camp (Independent) (1892)
1892	Walter Camp	2–0–2					
C. D. Bliss (Independent) (1893)
1893	C. D. Bliss	8–0–1					
Walter Camp (Independent) (1894–1895)
1894	Walter Camp	6–3					
1895	Walter Camp	4–0–1					
Harry P. Cross (Independent) (1896)
1896	Harry P. Cross	2–1–1					
George H. Brooke (Independent) (1897)
1897	George H. Brooke	4–1					
Harry P. Cross (Independent) (1898)
1898	Harry P. Cross	5–3–1					
Burr Chamberlain (Independent) (1899)
1899	Burr Chamberlain	2–5–2					
Fielding H. Yost (Independent) (1900)
1900	Fielding H. Yost	7–2–1					
Charles Fickert (Independent) (1901)
1901	Charles Fickert	3–2–2			L Rose		
Carl L. Clemans (Independent) (1902)
1902	Carl L. Clemans	6–1					
James F. Lanagan (Independent) (1903–1905)
1903	James F. Lanagan	8–0–3					
1904	James F. Lanagan	7–2–1					
1905	James F. Lanagan	8–0					
Rugby Team (Independent) (1906–1918)
1906–18	No team	(Note: From 1905 to 1917, Stanford played rugby in place of football. In 1918, Stanford did not field an official team due to World War I, though an unofficial squad made up of volunteers from the Students' Army Training Corps stationed at Stanford (some of whom were not Stanford students) hurriedly organized to play several games, all blowout losses.)					
Bob Evans (Pacific Coast Conference) (1919)
1919	Bob Evans	4–3	1–1	T–3rd			
Walter D. Powell (Pacific Coast Conference) (1920)
1920	Walter D. Powell	4–3	2–1	2nd			
Eugene Van Gent (Pacific Coast Conference) (1921)
1921	Eugene Van Gent	4–2–2	1–1–1	3rd			
Andrew Kerr (Pacific Coast Conference) (1922–1923)
1922	Andrew Kerr	4–5	1–3	T–5th			
1923	Andrew Kerr	7–2	2–2	T–3rd			
Pop Warner (Pacific Coast Conference) (1924–1932)
1924	Pop Warner	7–1–1	3–0–1	1st	L Rose		
1925	Pop Warner	7–2	4–1	2nd			
1926	Pop Warner	10–0–1	4–0	1st	T Rose		
1927	Pop Warner	8–2–1	4–0–1	T–1st	W Rose		
1928	Pop Warner	8–3–1	4–1–1	3rd			
1929	Pop Warner	9–2	5–1	2nd			
1930	Pop Warner	9–1–1	4–1	3rd			
1931	Pop Warner	7–2–2	2–2–1	T–5th			
1932	Pop Warner	6–4–1	1–3–1	7th			
Tiny Thornhill (Pacific Coast Conference) (1933–1939)
1933	Claude E. Thornhill	8–2–1	4–1	T–1st	L Rose		
1934	Claude E. Thornhill	9–1–1	5–0	1st	L Rose		
1935	Claude E. Thornhill	8–1	4–1	T–1st	W Rose		
1936	Claude E. Thornhill	2–5–2	2–3–2	6th			
1937	Claude E. Thornhill	4–3–2	4–2–1	2nd			
1938	Claude E. Thornhill	3–6	2–5	8th			
1939	Claude E. Thornhill	1–7–1	0–6–1	9th			
Clark Shaughnessy (Pacific Coast Conference) (1940–1941)
1940	Clark Shaughnessy	10–0	7–0	1st	W Rose		2
1941	Clark Shaughnessy	6–3	4–3	4th			
Marchmont Schwartz (Pacific Coast Conference) (1942–1950)
1942	Marchmont Schwartz	6–4	5–2	3rd			12
1943	No team						
1944	No team						
1945	No team						
1946	Marchmont Schwartz	6–3–1	3–3–1	5th			
1947	Marchmont Schwartz	0–9	0–7	10th			
1948	Marchmont Schwartz	4–6	3–4	5th			
1949	Marchmont Schwartz	7–3–1	4–2	T–3rd	W Pineapple (Note: Stanford considers the 1950 Pineapple Bowl a game of the 1949 regular season)		
1950	Marchmont Schwartz	5–3–2	2–2–2	T–4th			
Chuck Taylor (Pacific Coast Conference) (1951–1957)
1951	Chuck Taylor	9–2	6–1	1st	L Rose	7	7
1952	Chuck Taylor	5–5	2–5	T–6th			
1953	Chuck Taylor	6–3–1	5–1–1	2nd		17	19
1954	Chuck Taylor	4–6	2–4	6th			
1955	Chuck Taylor	6–3–1	3–2–1	3rd		20	16
1956	Chuck Taylor	4–6	3–4	6th			
1957	Chuck Taylor	6–4	4–3	5th			
Jack Curtice (Pacific Coast Conference) (1958)
1958	Jack Curtice	2–8	2–5	7th			
Jack Curtice (Athletic Association of Western Universities) (1959–1962)
1959	Jack Curtice	3–7	0–4	5th			
1960	Jack Curtice	0–10	0–4	5th			
1961	Jack Curtice	4–6	1–3	T–4th			
1962	Jack Curtice	5–5	2–3	4th			
John Ralston (AAWU / Pacific-8 Conference) (1963–1971)
1963	John Ralston	3–7	1–4	6th			
1964	John Ralston	5–5	3–4	5th			
1965	John Ralston	6–3–1	2–3	T–5th			
1966	John Ralston	5–5	1–4	8th			
1967	John Ralston	5–5	3–4	T–4th			
1968	John Ralston	6–3–1	3–3–1	T–3rd		20	
1969	John Ralston	7–2–1	5–1–1	T–2nd		14	19
1970	John Ralston	9–3	6–1	1st	W Rose	10	8
1971	John Ralston	9–3	6–1	1st	W Rose	16	10
Jack Christiansen (Pacific-8 Conference) (1972–1976)
1972	Jack Christiansen	6–5	2–5	T–6th			
1973	Jack Christiansen	7–4	5–2	3rd			
1974	Jack Christiansen	5–4–2	5–1–1	2nd			
1975	Jack Christiansen	6–4–1	5–2	T–3rd			
1976	Jack Christiansen	6–5	5–2	3rd			
Bill Walsh (Pacific-8 / Pacific-10 Conference) (1977–1978)
1977	Bill Walsh	9–3	5–2	T–2nd	W Sun	15	15
1978	Bill Walsh	8–4	4–3	T–4th	W Bluebonnet	16	17
Rod Dowhower (Pacific-10 Conference) (1979)
1979	Rod Dowhower	5–5–1	3–3–1	6th			
Paul Wiggin (Pacific-10 Conference) (1980–1983)
1980	Paul Wiggin	6–5	3–4	T–6th			
1981	Paul Wiggin	4–7	4–4	T–6th			
1982	Paul Wiggin	5–6	3–5	7th			
1983	Paul Wiggin	1–10	1–7	10th			
Jack Elway (Pacific-10 Conference) (1984–1988)
1984	Jack Elway	5–6	3–5	T–7th			
1985	Jack Elway	4–7	3–5	7th			
1986	Jack Elway	8–4	5–3	T–4th	L Gator		
1987	Jack Elway	5–6	4–4	T–4th			
1988	Jack Elway	3–6–2	1–5–2	9th			
Dennis Green (Pacific-10 Conference) (1989–1991)
1989	Dennis Green	3–8	3–5	T–7th			
1990	Dennis Green	5–6	4–4	T–6th			
1991	Dennis Green	8–4	6–2	T–2nd	L Aloha	22	22
Bill Walsh (Pacific-10 Conference) (1992–1994)
1992	Bill Walsh	10–3	6–2	T–1st	W Blockbuster	9	9
1993	Bill Walsh	4–7	2–6	T–8th			
1994	Bill Walsh	3–7–1	2–6	T–8th			
Tyrone Willingham (Pacific-10 Conference) (1995–2001)
1995	Tyrone Willingham	7–4–1	5–3	4th	L Liberty		
1996	Tyrone Willingham	7–5	5–3	3rd	W Sun		
1997	Tyrone Willingham	5–6	3–5	T–7th			
1998	Tyrone Willingham	3–8	2–6	T–8th			
1999	Tyrone Willingham	8–4	7–1	1st	L Rose^{†}	24	
2000	Tyrone Willingham	5–6	4–4	4th			
2001	Tyrone Willingham	9–3	6–2	T–2nd	L Seattle	17	16
Buddy Teevens (Pacific-10 Conference) (2002–2004)
2002	Buddy Teevens	2–9	1–7	T–9th			
2003	Buddy Teevens	4–7	2–6	T–8th			
2004	Buddy Teevens	4–7	2–6	T–8th			
Walt Harris (Pacific-10 Conference) (2005–2006)
2005	Walt Harris	5–6	4–4	T–4th			
2006	Walt Harris	1–11	1–8	10th			
Jim Harbaugh (Pacific-10 Conference) (2007–2010)
2007	Jim Harbaugh	4–8	3–6	T–7th			
2008	Jim Harbaugh	5–7	4–5	T–6th			
2009	Jim Harbaugh	8–5	6–3	T–2nd	L Sun		
2010	Jim Harbaugh	12–1	8–1	2nd	W Orange^{†}	4	4
David Shaw (Pac-12 Conference) (2011–2022)
2011	David Shaw	11–2	8–1	T–1st (North)	L Fiesta^{†}	7	7
2012	David Shaw	12–2	8–1	T–1st (North)	W Rose^{†}	6	7
2013	David Shaw	11–3	7–2	T–1st (North)	L Rose^{†}	10	11
2014	David Shaw	8–5	5–4	2nd (North)	W Foster Farms		
2015	David Shaw	12–2	8–1	1st (North)	W Rose^{†}	3	3
2016	David Shaw	10–3	6–3	3rd (North)	W Sun	12	12
2017	David Shaw	9–5	7–2	T–1st (North)	L Alamo	19	20
2018	David Shaw	9–4	6–3	3rd (North)	W Sun		
2019	David Shaw	4–8	3–6	T–5th (North)			
2020	David Shaw	4–2	4–2	3rd (North)			
2021	David Shaw	3–9	2–7	6th (North)			
2022	David Shaw	3–9	1–8	T–11th			
Troy Taylor (Pac-12 Conference) (2023)
2023	Troy Taylor	3–9	2–7	T–9th			
Troy Taylor (Atlantic Coast Conference) (2024)
2024	Troy Taylor	3–9	2–6	16th			
Frank Reich (Atlantic Coast Conference) (2025)
2025	Frank Reich	4–8	3–5				
Total:		670–498–49 (.571)					
National championship Conference title Conference division title or championship game berth
^{†}Indicates Bowl Coalition, Bowl Alliance, BCS, or CFP / New Years' Six bowl.; ^{#}Rankings from final Coaches Poll.; ^{°}Rankings from final AP Poll.
