= List of Stanford Cardinal head football coaches =

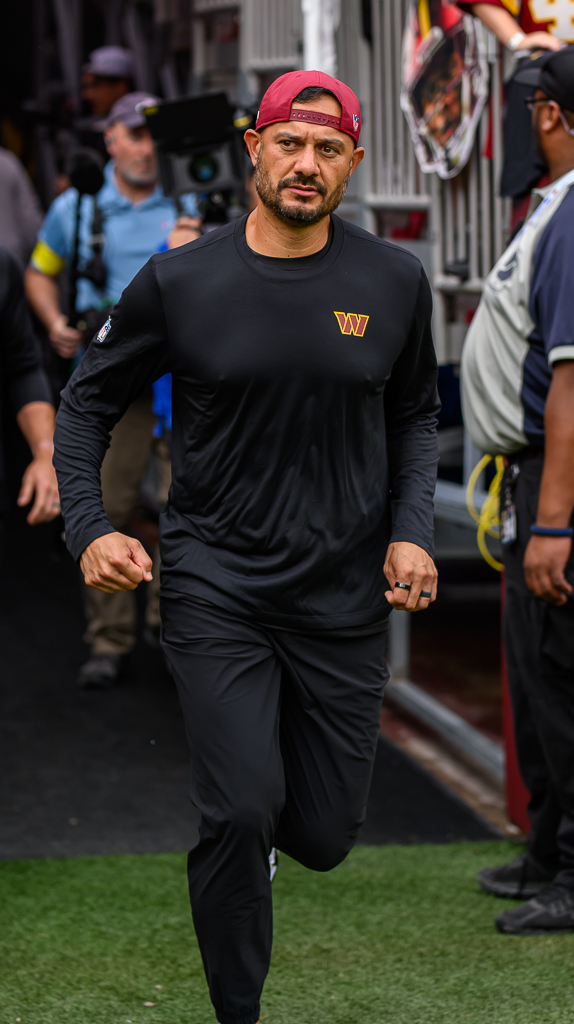
Tavita Pritchard, Stanford's head football coach since 2026

The Stanford Cardinal football program represents Stanford University in the Atlantic Coast Conference. The Cardinal competes as part of the National Collegiate Athletic Association (NCAA) Division I Football Bowl Subdivision. The team has had 33 head coaches since its founding in 1892. The current head coach is Tavita Pritchard, hired in 2025 to replace interim coach Frank Reich.

The Cardinal have played in 1,207 games of American football in 112 seasons. (Note: For 12 seasons from 1906 to 1917, Stanford replaced football with rugby. The school includes rugby matches and head coaches in their listings of overall football records.) In their first season, the team played 4 games with no head coach. From 1906 to 1917, Stanford replaced football with rugby. The school did not field teams in 1918 and from 1943 to 1945 due to World War I and World War II, respectively.

Conference championships have been won by Pop Warner, Tiny Thornhill, Clark Shaughnessy, Chuck Taylor, John Ralston, Bill Walsh, Tyrone Willingham, and David Shaw. Shaw is the all-time leader in games coached and most victories, having won his 72nd game in a 17–14 win over Cal in the 120th Big Game on November 18, 2017. James F. Lanagan is the leader in win percentage for coaches with more than one season of service. Shaw was also the Pac-12 Coach of the Year in 2011, 2012, 2015, and 2017 respectively.

Of the 32 Stanford head coaches, six—Walter Camp, Fielding H. Yost, Andrew Kerr, Warner, Shaughnessy, and Ralston—have been inducted in the College Football Hall of Fame as coaches. Four more—George H. Brooke (who played at Swarthmore), Marchmont Schwartz (who played at Notre Dame), Chuck Taylor (who played at Stanford) and Paul Wiggin (who also played at Stanford)—are in the Hall of Fame as players.

== Key ==
Key to symbols in coaches list
General		Overall		Conference		Postseason (Note: Although the first Rose Bowl Game was played in 1902, it has been continuously played since the 1916 game, and is recognized as the oldest bowl game by the NCAA. "—" indicates any season prior to 1916 when postseason games were not played.)	
No.	Order of coaches (Note: A running total of the number of head coaches, with coaches who served separate tenures being counted only once. Interim head coaches are represented with "Int" and are not counted in the running total. "—" indicates the team played but either without a coach or no coach is on record. "X" indicates an interim year without play.)	GC	Games coached	CW	Conference wins	PW	Postseason wins
DC	Division championships	OW	Overall wins	CL	Conference losses	PL	Postseason losses
CC	Conference championships	OL	Overall losses	CT	Conference ties	PT	Postseason ties
NC	National championships	OT	Overall ties (Note: Overtime rules in college football were introduced in 1996, making ties impossible in the period since.)	C%	Conference winning percentage		
†	Elected to the College Football Hall of Fame	O%	Overall winning percentage (Note: When computing the win–loss percentage, a tie counts as half a win and half a loss.)				

== Coaches ==
List of head football coaches showing season(s) coached, overall records, conference records, postseason records, championships and selected awards (Note: Statistics correct as of the end of the 2025 NCAA Division I FBS football season.)
No.	Name	Season(s)	GC	OW	OL	OT	O%	CW	CL	CT	C%	PW	PL	PT	DC (Note: Divisional champions have advanced to the Pac-12 Football Championship Game since the institution of divisional play beginning in the 2011 season. Since that time, Stanford has competed as a member of the Pac-12 North.)	CC (Note: Stanford was not a part of an athletic conference prior to 1919, when the school joined the Pacific Coast Conference. After the demise of that conference, the school joined the new Athletic Association of Western Universities in 1959, which became the Pacific-8 Conference in 1968, the Pacific-10 Conference in 1978, and the Pac-12 Conference in 2011.)	NC	Awards
1	Walter Camp^{†}	1892, 1894–1895	17	11	3	3	0.735	—	—	—	—	—	—	—	—	—	—	—
2	C. D. "Pop" Bliss	1893	9	8	0	1	0.944	—	—	—	—	—	—	—	—	—	0	—
3	Harry P. Cross	1896; 1898	13	7	4	2	0.615	—	—	—	—	—	—	—	—	—	0	—
4	George H. Brooke^{†}	1897	5	4	1	0	0.800	—	—	—	—	—	—	—	—	—	0	—
5	Burr Chamberlain	1899	9	2	5	2	0.333	—	—	—	—	—	—	—	—	—	0	—
6	Fielding H. Yost^{†}	1900	10	7	2	1	0.750	—	—	—	—	—	—	—	—	—	0	—
7	Charles Fickert	1901	7	3	2	2	0.571	—	—	—	—	0	1	0	—	—	0	—
8	Carl L. Clemans	1902	7	6	1	0	0.857	—	—	—	—	—	—	—	—	—	0	—
9	James F. Lanagan (Note: Football record only; Stanford includes Lanagan's 26–8–1 record in three seasons as rugby coach in his overall record.)	1903–1905	29	23	2	4	0.862	—	—	—	—	—	—	—	—	—	0	—
10	Bob Evans	1919	7	4	3	0	0.571	1	1	0	0.500	0	0	0	—	0	0	—
11	Walter D. Powell	1920	7	4	3	0	0.571	2	1	0	0.667	0	0	0	—	0	0	—
12	Eugene Van Gent	1921	8	4	2	2	0.625	1	1	0	0.500	0	0	0	—	0	0	—
13	Andrew Kerr^{†}	1922–1923	18	11	7	0	0.611	3	5	0	0.375	0	0	0	—	0	0	—
14	Pop Warner^{†}	1924–1932	96	71	17	8	0.781	31	9	5	0.744	1	1	1	—	3	1 – 1926	—
15	Claude E. Thornhill	1933–1939	67	35	25	7	0.575	25	18	4	0.574	1	2	0	—	3	0	—
16	Clark Shaughnessy^{†}	1940–1941	19	16	3	0	0.842	11	3	0	0.786	1	0	0	—	1	1 – 1940	AFCA Coach of the Year (1940)
17	Marchmont Schwartz^{†}	1942; 1946–1950	60	28	28	4	0.500	17	25	3	0.411	0	0	0	—	0	0	—
18	Chuck Taylor^{†}	1951–1957	71	40	29	2	0.577	25	20	2	0.553	0	1	0	—	1	0	AFCA Coach of the Year (1951)
19	Jack Curtice	1958–1962	50	14	36	0	0.280	5	19	0	0.208	0	0	0	—	0	0	—
20	John Ralston^{†}	1963–1971	94	55	36	3	0.601	30	25	2	0.544	2	0	0	—	2	0	Sporting News College Football Coach of the Year (1970)
21	Jack Christiansen	1972–1976	55	30	22	3	0.573	22	12	1	0.643	0	0	0	—	0	0	—
22	Bill Walsh	1977–1978; 1992–1994	59	34	24	1	0.585	19	19	0	0.500	3	0	0	—	1	0	Pac-8 Coach of the Year (1977)
23	Rod Dowhower	1979	11	5	5	1	0.500	3	3	1	0.500	0	0	0	—	0	0	—
24	Paul Wiggin^{†}	1980–1983	44	16	28	0	0.364	11	23	0	0.324	0	0	0	—	0	0	—
25	Jack Elway	1984–1988	56	25	29	2	0.464	16	22	2	0.425	0	1	0	—	0	0	—
26	Dennis Green	1989–1991	34	16	18	0	0.471	13	11	0	0.542	0	1	0	—	0	0	—
27	Tyrone Willingham	1995–2001	81	44	36	1	0.549	32	24	0	0.571	1	3	0	—	1	0	Pac-10 Coach of the Year (1999)
28	Buddy Teevens	2002–2004	33	10	23	—	0.303	5	19	—	0.208	0	0	—	—	0	0	—
29	Walt Harris	2005–2006	23	6	17	—	0.261	5	12	—	0.294	0	0	—	—	0	0	—
30	Jim Harbaugh	2007–2010	50	29	21	—	0.580	21	15	—	0.583	1	1	—	—	0	0	—
31	David Shaw	2011–2022	150	96	54	—	0.640	65	40	—	0.619	5	3	—	4	3	0	Pac-12 Coach of the Year (2011, 2012, 2015, 2017)
32	Troy Taylor	2023–2024	24	6	18	—	0.250	4	13	—	0.235	0	0	—	0	0	0	—
33	Frank Reich	2025	12	4	8	—	0.333	3	5	—	0.375	0	0	—	0	0	0	—
34	Tavita Pritchard	2026–present	4	2	2	—	0.500	1	2	—	0.333	0	0	—	0	0	0	—
