= Ray Courtright =

American athlete and coach (1891–1979)

- Ray Courtright, University of Michigan golf coach, 1934

Biographical details
- Born: September 19, 1891
- Died: August 1979

Playing career

Football
- 1911–1913: Oklahoma

Basketball
- 1912–1913: Oklahoma

Baseball
- 1911–1914: Oklahoma

Track and field
- 1912–1913: Oklahoma
- Positions: Halfback (football); Pitcher (baseball); Hurdler (track)

Coaching career (HC unless noted)

Football
- 1915–1917: Pittsburg State
- 1919–1923: Nevada
- 1924–1926: Colorado Mines
- 1927–1936: Michigan (assistant)
- 1946: Fresno State (assistant)

Basketball
- 1915–1919: Pittsburg State
- 1919–1923: Nevada
- 1924–1927: Colorado Mines

Golf
- 1936^{1}–1944: Michigan

Wrestling
- 1942–1944: Michigan

Head coaching record
- Overall: 48–41–10 (football); 37–50 (basketball)

Raymond O. Courtright (September 19, 1891 – August 1979) was an American football, basketball, and baseball player, coach of football, basketball, golf, and wrestling, and college athletics administrator. Courtright attended the University of Oklahoma where he played halfback for the football team from 1911 to 1913 and also competed in baseball, basketball and track. He was the head football coach at Pittsburg State University (1915–1917), the University of Nevada, Reno (1919–1923), and Colorado School of Mines (1924–1926). Courtright was also an assistant football coach (1927–1936), head golf coach (1936^{1}–1944) and head wrestling coach (1942–1944) at the University of Michigan.

== University of Oklahoma ==
Courtright was a multi-sport athlete at the University of Oklahoma competing in football, baseball, basketball and track. He played halfback for Bennie Owen's Oklahoma Sooners football team from 1911 to 1913. In November 1911, he helped Oklahoma break a nine-game losing streak to Kansas with a long run that set up a field goal for the game's only points in a 3–0 win. He was also reported to be one of the "Sooner stars" in a 14–6 win over Missouri in 1911. In November 1912, he scored all six of the Sooners' points on two field goals in the fourth quarter of a 6–5 win over Kansas. One Oklahoma newspaper noted:

"Oklahoma owes her victory to the educated toe of Raymond Courtright, who left a sick bed that he might give his team the advantage of his kicking in a pinch. For ten days he has not been in a football suit until Saturday."

And as a senior in 1913, he scored one of the Sooners' two touchdowns in a 14–3 win over Colorado in a game played in five inches of mud in front of a crowd of 5,000 at Oklahoma City. He was reportedly selected as an All-Southwestern halfback for three consecutive years. In 1919, one sports writer noted that Courtright was "considered the best halfback ever developed at Oklahoma."

Courtright was also a pitcher for Oklahoma's baseball team. He once pitched a no-hitter against Missouri, and on another occasion he pitched 20 innings in a 1–1 game against Oklahoma A&M. He also received varsity letters for basketball and track (as a hurdler). He graduated Phi Beta Kappa from Oklahoma in 1914.

== Early years as coach ==
After graduating from Oklahoma, Courtright started his coaching career either at Oklahoma Preparatory, or at Atlanta Union Preparatory School. In 1915, he was hired by Kansas State Normal School at Pittsburg (now known as Pittsburg State University). He served as the head football coach at Pittsburg for three seasons from 1915 to 1917, compiling a record of 15–11–2. Courtright also served as the athletic director at Pittsburg.

== University of Nevada, Reno ==
In April 1919, Courtright was hired by the University of Nevada, Reno as its director of athletics and head coach of the football, basketball, baseball and track teams. Courtright was Nevada's football coach for five years from 1919 to 1923. During his years at Nevada, Courtright was "affectionately known as 'Corky'."

In his first year as Nevada's coach, Courtright led the 1919 Nevada Sagebrushers football team to an 8–1–1 record, doubling the highest season win total of any prior Nevada football team. The only loss came in the first game of the season, a 13–7 loss to the California freshmen. The team outscored its opponents 450 to 32, including scores of 132–0 over the Pacific Tigers, 102–0 over the Mare Island Marines, and 56–0 over University Farm. At the time, Courtright called the 1919 Nevada team "the best team I ever had," and others called it the "best team that ever played on Mackay Field." At the end of the 1919 season, the Reno Evening Gazette wrote:

"It was a good move when the students and regents decided last spring to go east and get one of the best men to come to Nevada and build up a football team. In selecting a coach they also demanded an all-round man, who could coach basket ball, track, baseball and put into operation a regular system of physical culture for all the students as well. Courtright fitted the requirements and the football season proves the wisdom of the selection ..."

In 1920, Courtright's team finished with a record of 7–3–1 with wins over both the Utah Utes (14–7) and Utah State Aggies (21–0), and losses to California (79–7), USC (38–7), and Santa Clara (27–21).

Courtright never reached the same level of success after the 1920 season, finishing 4–3–1 in 1921, 5–3–1 in 1922 and 2–3–3 in 1923. However, his most notable game at Nevada was a scoreless tie with California on November 3, 1923. The 1923 California team was known as the "Wonder Team." It had gone through three full seasons without a loss, and had outscored its opponents 151 to 0 in the first seven games of the 1923 season. Nevada had only 15 men on its football team in 1923 and was considered to be a decided underdog. When Courtright returned to the Nevada campus in 1961, he was shown souvenirs of his time at the school. Ty Cobb, then a sports columnist, accompanied Courtright and wrote: "Courtright chuckled when he saw a huge framed layout of newspaper headlines from 1923 – when Nevada tied the great California 'Wonder Team.' 'Yep, that WAS quite a game,' he chortled."

Courtright compiled a record of 26–13–7 while at Nevada, and his teams outscored opponents by a combined total of 993 to 464. Shortly before his resignation in 1924, the Nevada State Journal credited Courtright with having "brought the Nevada eleven from the class of a second rate team to its present rank among the best of the western college football squads."

Courtright was also the head basketball coach at Nevada and led the basketball team to championships of the California-Nevada Basketball League in both 1920 and 1921. Courtright's teams finished with records of 6–2 and 10–3 in 1920 and 1921, but suffered losing seasons in 1922 and 1923. In four seasons as Nevada's basketball coach, Courtright compiled a record of 25 wins and 29 losses.

== Colorado School of Mines ==
In March 1924, Courtright was hired away from Nevada by the Colorado School of Mines in Golden, Colorado. At the time, the School of Mines had an enrollment of 450 students. Courtright was given a three-year contract at an advanced salary with a promise of a raise after the first season. Courtright stated that he regretted leaving Nevada but could not turn down the offer made by the Colorado school. He was the head football coach at the Colorado School of Mines from 1924 to 1926 and compiled a record of 7–17–1.

== University of Michigan ==
In September 1927, Courtright was hired as an assistant football coach at the University of Michigan. He served in that capacity from 1927 to 1936.

Courtright was also the head golf coach at Michigan from 1936^{1} to 1944. He coached NCAA individual champion Chuck Kocsis (1936) and 1943 Michigan golf team was also the runner up in the NCAA National Championship.

In 1942, he was also appointed as the head coach of Michigan's wrestling team while regular coach Cliff Keen was serving in the military. In addition to the NCAA golf championship, Courtright's teams won eight Big Ten Conference golf championships and one Big Ten wrestling championship. In August 1944, Courtright reported that he had received notice from the University of Michigan that his coaching position was being terminated, effective November 1, 1944, for economic reasons.

== Fresno State ==
In May 1946, Courtright was hired by Fresno State College (now known as California State University, Fresno) as an assistant football coach. Fresno State's head football coach, Jimmy Bradshaw, had been Courtright's top ground gainer when Courtright was the head coach at Nevada.

== Head coaching record ==
=== Football ===
Year	Team	Overall	Conference	Standing
Pittsburg State (Kansas Collegiate Athletic Conference) (1915–1917)
1915	Pittsburg State	4–5	2–2	T–6th
1916	Pittsburg State	7–3	3–1	T–3rd
1917	Pittsburg State	4–3–2	3–2–1	6th
Pittsburg State:		15–11–2	8–5–1	
Nevada Sagebrushers / Wolf Pack (Independent) (1919–1923)
1919	Nevada	8–1–1		
1920	Nevada	7–3–1		
1921	Nevada	4–3–1		
1922	Nevada	5–3–1		
1923	Nevada	2–3–3		
Nevada:		26–13–7		
Colorado Mines Orediggers (Rocky Mountain Conference) (1924–1926)
1924	Colorado Mines	4–4–1	3–4–1	8th
1925	Colorado Mines	2–7	2–6	9th
1926	Colorado Mines	1–6	1–5	11th
Colorado Mines:		7–17–1	6–15–1	
Total:		48–41–10		

=== Men's basketball ===
Record table
Season	Team	Overall	Conference	Standing	Postseason
Pittsburg State (Kansas Collegiate Athletic Conference) (1915–1919)
1915–16	Pittsburg State	1–9			
1916–17	Pittsburg State	8–10			
1917–18	Pittsburg State	3–14			
1918–19	Pittsburg State	9–6			
Pittsburg State:		21–39 (.350)	– (–)		
Nevada Sagebrushers / Wolf Pack (Independent) (1919–1923)
1919–20	Nevada	6–2			
1920–21	Nevada	10–3			
1921–22	Nevada	4–11			
1922–23	Nevada	5–13			
Nevada:		25–29 (.463)			
Colorado Mines Orediggers (Rocky Mountain Conference) (1924–1926)
1924–25	Colorado Mines	5–7	4–7		
1925–26	Colorado Mines	4–8	3–7		
1926–27	Colorado Mines	2–10	2–10		
Colorado Mines:		11–25 (.306)	9–24 (.273)		
Total:		57–93 (.380)			

== Notes ==
1. University of Michigan records indicate that Thomas Trueblood was listed officially as the head golf coach until 1935. However, Trueblood had retired to professor emeritus status in 1926 at age 70. By the time Trueblood "officially" retired and was given the title of "coach emeritus" in 1935, he was nearly 80. As some sources list Courtright as the head coach starting in 1929, it is unclear what the precise division of responsibilities were between Courtright and Trueblood from 1929 to 1935.
