= 1919 Santa Clara Missionites football team =

American college football season

1919 Santa Clara Missionites football
- Conference: Independent
- Record: 2–4
- Head coach: Robert E. Harmon (1st season)
- Home stadium: Mission Field

1919 Western college football independents records
	Conf.			Overall
Team	W	L	T	W		L		T
Hawaii		–		4	–	0	–	1
Arizona		–		7	–	1	–	0
Nevada		–		8	–	1	–	1
New Mexico		–		3	–	0	–	2
USC		–		4	–	1	–	0
Saint Mary's		–		3	–	3	–	1
New Mexico A&M		–		2	–	3	–	1
Gonzaga		–		2	–	3	–	0
Santa Clara		–		2	–	4	–	0
University Farm		–		2	–	5	–	0
South Branch		–		2	–	6	–	0
Pacific (CA)		–		1	–	4	–	0
Tempe Normal		–		0	–	2	–	0

The 1919 Santa Clara Missionites football team was an American football team that represented Santa Clara University as an independent during the 1919 college football season. The team compiled a 2–4 record but nevertheless outscored opponents by a total of 130 to 86, on the strength of two 60-point games against the crews of USS Boston and USS Nebraska.

The team was led by first-year coach Robert E. Harmon. Harmon had played football at Illinois College, University of Denver, and Creighton University, and had then coached teams at All Hallows College (Salt Lake City), Gonzaga University, Davis Farm (now known as UC-Davis), and Illinois College.

== Schedule ==
Date	Opponent	Site	Result	Attendance	Source
October 4	at California		Cancelled		
October 12	Olympic Club	Mission Field; Santa Clara, CA	L 3–19		
October 19	USS Boston	Mission Field; Santa Clara, CA	W 60–0		
October 26	USS Nebraska	Mission Field; Santa Clara, CA	W 60–7		
November 8	at Stanford	Stanford Field; Stanford, CA	L 0–13		
November 22	at Nevada	Mackay Field; Reno, NV	L 7–41		
November 27	vs. Olympic Club	Ewing Field; San Francisco, CA	L 0–6		
