= 1917 Santa Clara rugby team =

American college football season

1917 Santa Clara Missionites football
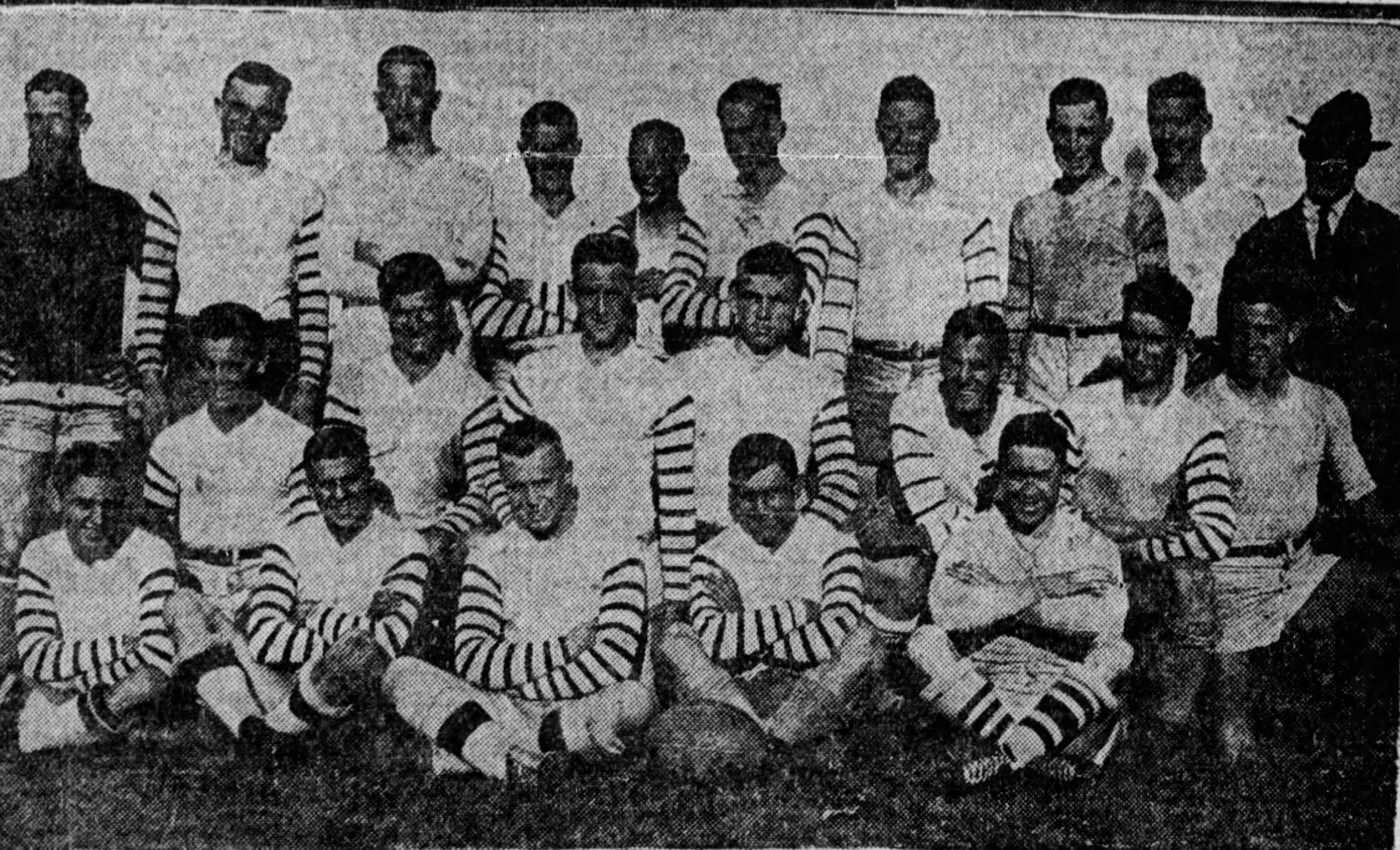
- Conference: Independent
- Record: 9–1
- Head coach: Walter Von Mandersheid (1st season)
- Home stadium: Mission Field

The 1917 Santa Clara rugby team was a college rugby team that represented Santa Clara University as an independent during the 1917 college football season. The team compiled a 9–1 record, shut out eight of ten opponents, and outscored all opponents by a total of 334 to 18.

Charley Austin resigned as the team's head coach after the first game. He was replaced by Walter Von Mandersheid.

During the 1910s, many California colleges replaced their American football programs with rugby. Santa Clara includes these teams as part of its college football history.

== Schedule ==
Date	Opponent	Site	Result	Attendance	Source
September 23	Olympic Club	Mission Field; Santa Clara, CA	W 30–0		
September 30	Palo Alto Athletic Club		W 31–3		
October 7	Fort Mason 2nd Infantry		W 40–0		
October 14	Olympic Club	Santa Clara, CA	W 8–0		
October 21	Barbarians Club	Santa Clara, CA	W 55–0		
	Palo Alto Athletic Club		W 30–0		
November 4	Olympic Club	Santa Clara, CA	W 29–0		
November 11	Palo Alto Athletic Club		W 32–0		
November 18	Barbarians Club		W 63–0		
November 24	at Stanford	Stanford Field; Stanford, CA	L 11–15		
