= 1919 University of New Mexico football team =

American college football season

1919 University of New Mexico football
- Conference: Independent
- Record: 3–0–2
- Head coach: John F. McGough (1st season)
- Home stadium: University Field

1919 Western college football independents records
	Conf.			Overall
Team	W	L	T	W		L		T
Hawaii		–		4	–	0	–	1
Arizona		–		7	–	1	–	0
Nevada		–		8	–	1	–	1
New Mexico		–		3	–	0	–	2
USC		–		4	–	1	–	0
Saint Mary's		–		3	–	3	–	1
New Mexico A&M		–		2	–	3	–	1
Gonzaga		–		2	–	3	–	0
Santa Clara		–		2	–	4	–	0
University Farm		–		2	–	5	–	0
South Branch		–		2	–	6	–	0
Pacific (CA)		–		1	–	4	–	0
Tempe Normal		–		0	–	2	–	0

The 1919 University of New Mexico football team was an American football team that represented the University of New Mexico as an independent during the 1919 college football season. In their first and only season under head coach John F. McGough, the Lobos compiled a 3–0–2 record, shut out three of five opponents, and outscored all opponents by a total of 136 to 15.

The Mann brothers, Claude (sometimes Claud) at quarterback and Grant at halfback, starred for the 1919 team. Claude was the team captain.

Four New Mexico players received first-team honors on the 1919 All-Southwest football team selected by Pop McKale for Spalding's Football Guide: Grant Mann at halfback; Dwight McClure at tackle; Glen Rogers at end; and Ben Gerpheide at fullback.

== Schedule ==
Date	Opponent	Site	Result	Source
October 18	New Mexico Mines	University Field; Albuquerque, NM	W 55–0	
October 25	Colorado Mines	University Field; Albuquerque, NM	T 0–0	
November 1	at New Mexico Military	Roswell, NM	T 0–0	
November 15	at Texas Mines	El Paso High School stadium; El Paso, TX	W 57–13	
November 27	New Mexico A&M	University Field; Albuquerque, NM (rivalry)	W 24–2	
