= 1919 Nevada Sagebrushers football team =

American college football season

1919 Nevada Sagebrushers football
- Conference: Independent
- Record: 8–1–1
- Head coach: Ray Courtright (1st season)
- Home stadium: Mackay Field

1919 Western college football independents records
	Conf.			Overall
Team	W	L	T	W		L		T
Hawaii		–		4	–	0	–	1
Arizona		–		7	–	1	–	0
Nevada		–		8	–	1	–	1
New Mexico		–		3	–	0	–	2
USC		–		4	–	1	–	0
Saint Mary's		–		3	–	3	–	1
New Mexico A&M		–		2	–	3	–	1
Gonzaga		–		2	–	3	–	0
Santa Clara		–		2	–	4	–	0
University Farm		–		2	–	5	–	0
South Branch		–		2	–	6	–	0
Pacific (CA)		–		1	–	4	–	0
Tempe Normal		–		0	–	2	–	0

The 1919 Nevada Sagebrushers football team was an American football team that represented the University of Nevada as an independent during the 1919 college football season. In their first season under head coach Ray Courtright, the team compiled an 8–1–1 record, shut out seven of ten opponents, and outscored all opponents by a total of 449 to 32.

== Schedule ==
Date	Opponent	Site	Result	Attendance	Source
September 27	at California freshmen	California Field; Berkeley, CA	L 7–13		
October 4	Nevada Alumni	Mackay Field; Reno, NV	W 32–0		
October 10	at Stewart Indian School (NV)	Stewart Field; Carson City, NV	W 54–0		
October 18	Mare Island Naval Base	Mackay Field; Reno, NV	W 102–0		
October 25	Pacific (CA)	Mackay Field; Reno, NV	W 132–0		
November 1	California freshmen	Mackay Field; Reno, NV	W 13–12		
November 8	at University Farm	Davis, CA	W 13–0		
November 15	Saint Mary's	Mackay Field; Reno, NV	T 0–0		
November 22	Santa Clara	Mackay Field; Reno, NV	W 41–7		
November 27	University Farm	Mackay Field; Reno, NV	W 56–0		
