= 1920 Rose Bowl =

American college football game

1920 Tournament East-West football game
- 6th Rose Bowl Game
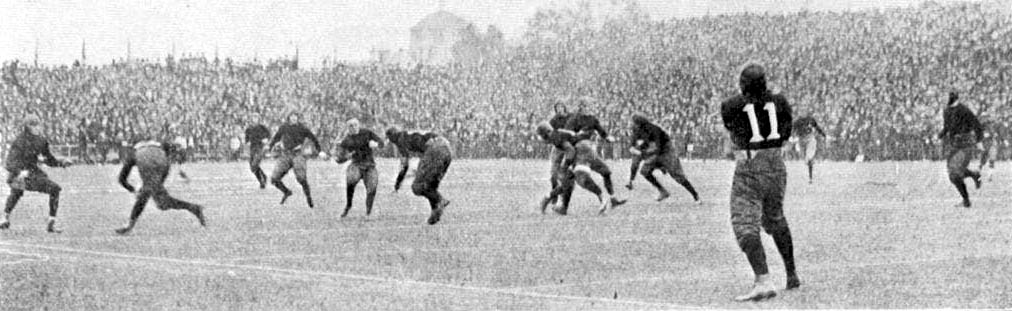
- The kickoff to start the game. Ralph Horween (#11) of Harvard catches the ball
Harvard Crimson	Oregon Webfoots
(8–0–1)	(5–1)
Independent	PCC
7	6
Head coach: Bob Fisher	Head coach: Charles A. Huntington
	1	2	3	4	Total
Harvard	0	7	0	0	7
Oregon	0	6	0	0	6
- Date: January 1, 1920
- Season: 1919
- Stadium: Tournament Park
- Location: Pasadena, California
- MVP: Eddie Casey (Harvard)
- Attendance: 32,000–35,000

The 1920 Rose Bowl, known at the time as the Tournament East-West Football Game, was a college football bowl game in Pasadena, California, played on January 1, 1920. In the sixth Rose Bowl, the once-tied Harvard Crimson met the once-defeated Oregon Webfoots at Tournament Park; Harvard won 7–6, with all of the scoring in the second quarter.

Crimson halfback Edward Casey was named the Rose Bowl Player of the Game when the award was created in 1953 and selections were made retroactively. It was the first Rose Bowl game following World War I in which college football returned to the Tournament of Roses. The two previous Tournament games had featured teams from the United States armed forces.

== Game summary ==
Following a field goal by future Oregon Sports Hall of Famer Bill Steers, Harvard scored on a 13-yard run by Fred Church on a drive that was keyed by two catches by future College Football Hall of Famer Eddie Casey. Arnold Horween added the extra point, which would prove critical as Oregon could only manage one more score, a field goal from 128-pound (58 kg) Skeet Manerud. Four other Oregon kicks were blocked or missed, including a fourth-quarter Manerud attempt that just missed.

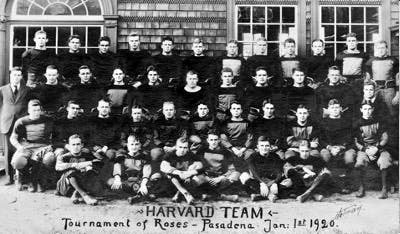
Harvard team

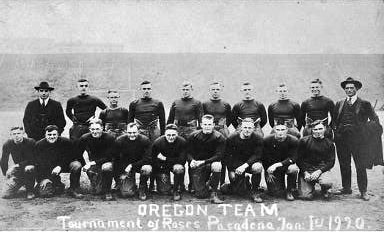
Oregon team

=== Scoring ===
	1	2	3	4	Total
Harvard	0	7	0	0	7
Oregon	0	6	0	0	6

Qtr.	Team	Scoring play	Score
2	ORE	Bill Steers 25 yard FG	ORE 3–0
2	HARV	Fred Church 13 yard rush, Arnold Horween kick	HARV 7–3
2	ORE	Skeet Manerud 30 yard FG	HARV 7–6

== Aftermath ==
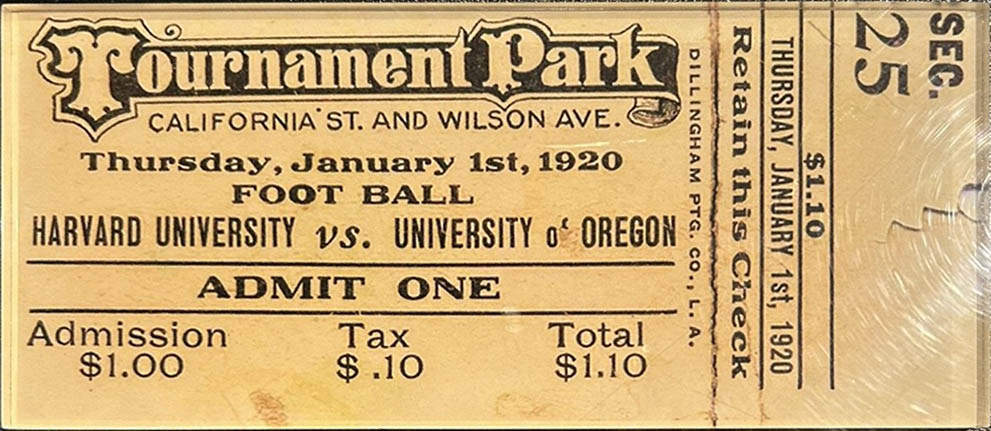
A preserved ticket for the game

The 1919 Harvard team was undefeated, with two close calls; the only blemish was a come-from-behind tie at Princeton on November 8.

Oregon finished with two losses; during the regular season, the Webfoots fell 7−0 to Washington State in Portland, also on November 8.

== Bibliography ==
- Oregon Ducks football media guide
- Harvard Crimson football media guide
- Williams, Harry A. – FOOTBALL TITLE SETTLED TODAY. Harvard and Oregon Elevens are Both Primed for the Greatest Game of the Season; General Betting Gives Crimson Players Distinct Edge. Los Angeles Times, January 1, 1920
- Hayden, Charles F. – GAME'S COLORFUL SETTING. Huge Crowd Turns Out for East vs. West Football Match—Military Touch. Los Angeles Times, January 2, 1920
- Williams, Harry A. – HARVARD WINS BY A POINT. Oregon's Showing a Triumph for Coach Shy Huntington and His Helpers. Los Angeles Times, January 2, 1920
- Lowry, Paul – CHURCH'S DASH BRINGS VICTORY Harvard's Crack Half Back Makes a Great Run; Oregon's Defeat Centered on this Desperate Rush; Northerner's Superior Condition was Apparent. Los Angeles Times, January 2, 1920 'Freddie Church, straddling through a mixed mass of players on a wide end run, snipped off the distance that meant victory for Harvard over Oregon yesterday. The score was 7 to 6. Church's dash was for only two yards, measured straight down the field, but before he had stretched his long limbs to a point directly behind the goal posts he had covered something like 70 yards.'
