= Bob Fisher (American football coach) =

American football player and coach (1888–1942)

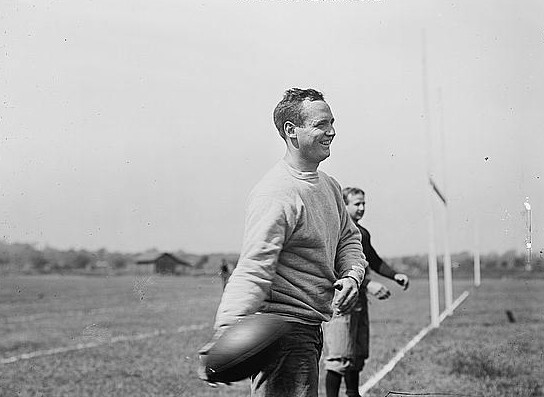

Biographical details
- Born: December 3, 1888; Boston, Massachusetts, U.S.
- Died: July 7, 1942 (aged 53); Newton, Massachusetts, U.S.
- Education: Harvard College

Playing career
- 1909–1911: Harvard
- Position: Guard

Coaching career (HC unless noted)
- 1912–1918: Harvard (Asst.)
- 1919–1925: Harvard

Head coaching record
- Overall: 43–14–5
- Bowls: 1–0

Accomplishments and honors

Championships
- As coach: National (1919); As player: National (1910)

Awards
- 2× Consensus All-American (1910, 1911); Third-team All-American (1909)
- College Football Hall of Fame; Inducted in 1973 (profile)

Robert T. Fisher (December 3, 1888 – July 7, 1942) was an American college football player and coach. He played college football at Harvard University and was a consensus All-American in 1910 and 1911. He served as the head football coach at Harvard from 1919 to 1925, compiling a record of 43–14–5 and winning the 1920 Rose Bowl. His 1919 team was retroactively recognized as a national champion by a number of selectors. Fisher was one of the original trustees for the American Football Coaches Association (AFCA). He was inducted into the College Football Hall of Fame as a player in 1973.

== Playing career ==
Fisher, circa 1910

Fisher was born on December 3, 1888, in Boston. He grew up in Dorchester and played tackle at Phillips Academy, where he was a teammate of John Kilpatrick. He played guard on Harvard’s freshman team in 1908 and on the varsity team from 1909 to 1911. He was captain of the 1911 Harvard Crimson football team. He was a second team All-American in 1909 and a consensus first team All-American in 1910 and 1911.

== Military service ==
In 1917, Fisher was commissioned as a first lieutenant in the Aviation Section of the United States Army Signal Corps and assigned to the San Antonio Aviation General Supply Depot. In 1918 he was transferred to Wilbur Wright Field in Dayton, Ohio, where he was later promoted to captain. While at Wright he met Louise Winters and they married when he was discharged in March 1919. The Fishers had four sons and one daughter. After the war, Fisher returned to C. F. Hovey.

== Coaching ==
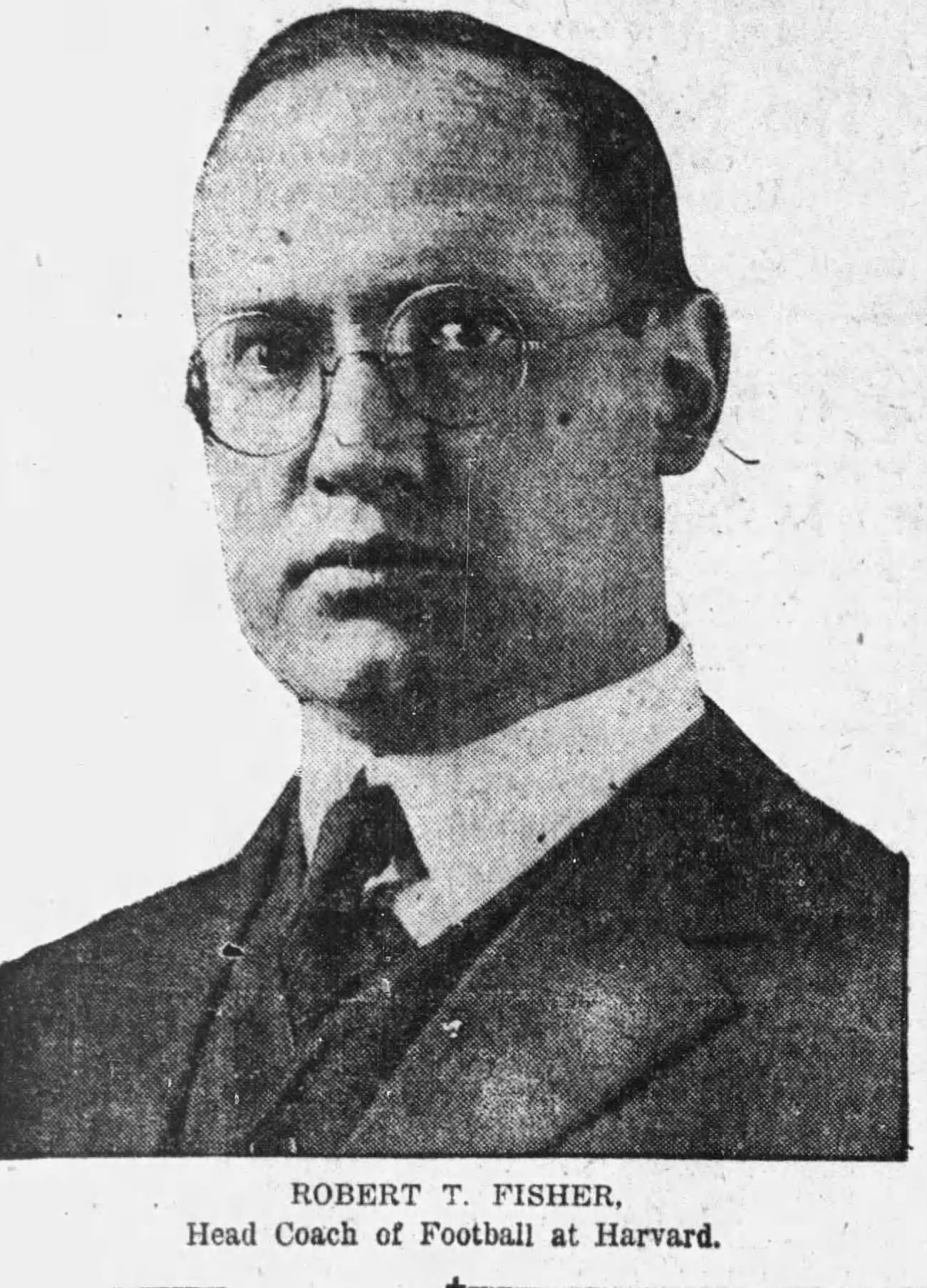
Fisher in 1924

After graduating in 1912, Fisher went to work for the C. F. Hovey department store, but remained involved with the Crimson as an assistant football coach. On June 13, 1919, it was announced that he would succeed Percy Haughton as Harvard's head football coach. He was chosen after Haughton's lead assistant, Leo Leary, turned down the job to focus on his business interests. His 1919 team went undefeated and won the 1920 Rose Bowl over Oregon and was retroactively recognized as a national champion by the Helms Athletic Foundation and the Houlgate System, and as a co-national champion by the College Football Researchers Association, National Championship Foundation, and Parke H. Davis. The following year, Harvard went 8–0–1 and was retroactively named as the co-national champion by the Boand System, however the majority of selectors have chosen California as the national champion for 1920. In 1921, Harvard lost to Center College in what is widely considered one of the greatest upsets in college football history.

On February 3, 1925, Fisher informed the Harvard Athletic Committee that he would not return as head coach. He was persuaded to reconsider and on March 4, 1925, it was announced he would return as head coach. After the season, Fisher announced he would not return as head coach. Fisher compiled a record of 43–14–5 in his seven seasons as Harvard's coach. He had a 4–2–1 record in the Harvard–Yale game. He had less success in the annual game against Princeton, amassing a 1–4–2 record and losing by a combined score of 70 to 0 in his final two seasons as coach.

== Later life ==
Fisher worked at Lee, Higginson & Co. until 1927, when he and Francis Ouimet were chosen to head the Boston office of the stock and commodities exchange house Harriss, Irby & Vose. In 1931 he joined Spencer Trask & Co. and in 1940 was promoted to manager. On July 7, 1942, Fisher died of a heart attack at Newton Hospital. He was survived by his wife, daughter, and four sons. Fisher's four sons played together at his alma mater, Phillips Academy and went on to play for Harvard. Three of them played together on the 1942 team while the fourth was unavailable due to military commitments. At the time of his death, Fisher resided in Weston, Massachusetts.

== Head coaching record ==
Year	Team	Overall	Conference	Standing	Bowl/playoffs
Harvard Crimson (Independent) (1919–1925)
1919	Harvard	9–0–1			W Rose
1920	Harvard	8–0–1			
1921	Harvard	7–2–1			
1922	Harvard	7–2			
1923	Harvard	4–3–1			
1924	Harvard	4–4			
1925	Harvard	4–3–1			
Harvard:		43–14–5			
Total:		43–14–5			
National championship Conference title Conference division title or championship game berth
