= 1919 Pacific Tigers football team =

American college football season

1919 Pacific Tigers football
- Conference: Independent
- Record: 1–4
- Head coach: George Sperry (1st season)

1919 Western college football independents records
	Conf.			Overall
Team	W	L	T	W		L		T
Hawaii		–		4	–	0	–	1
Arizona		–		7	–	1	–	0
Nevada		–		8	–	1	–	1
New Mexico		–		3	–	0	–	2
USC		–		4	–	1	–	0
Saint Mary's		–		3	–	3	–	1
New Mexico A&M		–		2	–	3	–	1
Gonzaga		–		2	–	3	–	0
Santa Clara		–		2	–	4	–	0
University Farm		–		2	–	5	–	0
South Branch		–		2	–	6	–	0
Pacific (CA)		–		1	–	4	–	0
Tempe Normal		–		0	–	2	–	0

The 1919 Pacific Tigers football team represented the College of the Pacific—now known as the University of the Pacific—in Stockton, California as an independent during the 1919 college football season. Led by George Sperry in his first and only season as head coach, Pacific compiled a record of 1–4. The game against on October 25, won by Nevada by a score of 132 to 0, was the worst loss in Pacific football history and the largest margin-of-victory for Nevada's football program. The win against Mare Island at the end of the season was the first victory for the Pacific program since their establishment in 1895.

== Schedule ==
Date	Opponent	Site	Result	Source
October 8	at California freshmen	College Park, San Jose, CA	L 0–79	
October 25	at Nevada	Mackay Field; Reno, NV	L 0–132	
November 1	at Stanford B team	Stanford, CA	L 0–38	
November 9	Stanford freshmen	College Park, San Jose, CA	L 7–36	
November 15	Mare Island NTS	College Park, San Jose, CA	W 20–0	
