= 1919 University Farm football team =

American college football season

1919 University Farm football
- Conference: Independent
- Record: 2–5
- Head coach: William E. Bobbitt (1st season)
- Captain: Tom Cuffe

1919 Western college football independents records
	Conf.			Overall
Team	W	L	T	W		L		T
Hawaii		–		4	–	0	–	1
Arizona		–		7	–	1	–	0
Nevada		–		8	–	1	–	1
New Mexico		–		3	–	0	–	2
USC		–		4	–	1	–	0
Saint Mary's		–		3	–	3	–	1
New Mexico A&M		–		2	–	3	–	1
Gonzaga		–		2	–	3	–	0
Santa Clara		–		2	–	4	–	0
University Farm		–		2	–	5	–	0
South Branch		–		2	–	6	–	0
Pacific (CA)		–		1	–	4	–	0
Tempe Normal		–		0	–	2	–	0

The 1919 University Farm football team represented the University Farm—now known as the University of California, Davis—as an independent during the 1919 college football season. Although "University Farm" was the formal name for the school and team, in many newspaper articles from the time it was called "Davis Farm". The team had no nickname in 1919, with the "Aggie" term being introduced in 1922. Led by William E. Bobbitt in his first and only season as head coach, the team compiled a record of 2–5 and was outscored its opponents 109 to 63 for the season. The University Farm played home games in Davis, California.

The school did not field a team in 1918 due to World War I.

== Schedule ==
Date	Opponent	Site	Result	Source
October 18?	Preston Industrial School (Note: The Preston School of Industry opened in 1894 to rehabilitate juvenile offenders. It remained open until 2011.)		W 38–0	
October 25	at California freshmen	California Field; Berkeley, CA	L 0–7	
November 1	at Stanford freshmen	Stanford, CA	L 6–19	
November 8	Nevada	Davis, CA	L 0–13	
November 15	USS Boston (Note: The USS Boston was a cruiser that was launched in 1883. It was decommissioned in 1907, but recommissioned as a Receiving ship in 1918 and towed to Yerba Buena Island in San Francisco Bay)	Davis, CA	W 19–0	
November 22	Saint Mary's	Davis, CA	L 0–14	
November 27	at Nevada	Mackay Stadium (Note: This stadium is the predecessor to the current Mackay Stadium, which was opened for the 1966 season."University of Nevada, Reno; Mackay Stadium".); Reno, NV	L 0–56	
