= 1919 Gonzaga Blue and White football team =

American college football season

1919 Gonzaga Blue and White football
- Conference: Independent
- Record: 2–3
- Head coach: William S. Higgins (1st season)

1919 Western college football independents records
	Conf.			Overall
Team	W	L	T	W		L		T
Hawaii		–		4	–	0	–	1
Arizona		–		7	–	1	–	0
Nevada		–		8	–	1	–	1
New Mexico		–		3	–	0	–	2
USC		–		4	–	1	–	0
Saint Mary's		–		3	–	3	–	1
New Mexico A&M		–		2	–	3	–	1
Gonzaga		–		2	–	3	–	0
Santa Clara		–		2	–	4	–	0
University Farm		–		2	–	5	–	0
South Branch		–		2	–	6	–	0
Pacific (CA)		–		1	–	4	–	0
Tempe Normal		–		0	–	2	–	0

The 1919 Gonzaga Blue and White football team was an American football team that represented the Gonzaga University as an independent during the 1919 college football season. In their first year under head coach William S. Higgins, the team compiled a 2–3 record.

== Schedule ==
Date	Opponent	Site	Result	Source
October 26	vs. Gonzaga alumni	Spokane, WA	L 0–6	
November 1	Montana Mines	Fairgrounds; Spokane, WA	W 41–7	
November 8	at Whitman	Walla Walla, WA	W 38–0	
November 15	Idaho	Fairgrounds; Spokane, WA	L 7–13	
November 27	at Oregon Agricultural	Corvallis, OR	L 0–50	
