= 1919 Arizona Wildcats football team =

American college football season

1919 Arizona Wildcats football
- Conference: Independent
- Record: 7–1
- Head coach: Pop McKale (5th season)
- Captain: Emzy Harvey Lynch

1919 Western college football independents records
	Conf.			Overall
Team	W	L	T	W		L		T
Hawaii		–		4	–	0	–	1
Arizona		–		7	–	1	–	0
Nevada		–		8	–	1	–	1
New Mexico		–		3	–	0	–	2
USC		–		4	–	1	–	0
Saint Mary's		–		3	–	3	–	1
New Mexico A&M		–		2	–	3	–	1
Gonzaga		–		2	–	3	–	0
Santa Clara		–		2	–	4	–	0
University Farm		–		2	–	5	–	0
South Branch		–		2	–	6	–	0
Pacific (CA)		–		1	–	4	–	0
Tempe Normal		–		0	–	2	–	0

The 1919 Arizona Wildcats football team represented the University of Arizona as an independent during the 1919 college football season. In their fifth season under head coach Pop McKale, the Wildcats compiled a 7–1 record, shut out seven of eight opponents (albeit one game by claim of forfeit), and outscored all opponents, 253 to 19. In the fifth meeting in what later became the Arizona–Arizona State football rivalry, Arizona defeated the Tempe Normal Owls by a 59–0 score.

The team's roster included Louis "Slonnie" Sloaaker (quarterback), "Gyp" Manzo and Aaron McCreary (halfbacks), John Hobbs (fullback), Billie Wofford and Tommy Marlar (ends), Big Dick Smith and Howard Barkley (guards), George Hardaway and Oscar Cook (tackles), and the team captain Emzy Harvey Lynch (center).

== Schedule ==
Date	Opponent	Site	Result	Source
October 11	Tempe	Tucson, AZ (rivalry)	W 59–0	
October 18	Phoenix Indians	Tucson, AZ	W 60–0	
October 25	Camp Harry J. Jones	Tucson, AZ	W 20–0	
October 31	at New Mexico A&M	Mesilla Park, NM	W 33–0	
November 15	at Whittier	Whittier, CA	W 1–0 (default)	
November 8	Pomona	University athletic field; Tucson, AZ	L 7–19	
November 21	Texas Mines	Tucson, AZ	W 46–0	
November 27	Occidental	University athletic field; Tucson, AZ	W 27–0	
