= 1919 Oregon Agricultural Aggies football team =

American college football season

1919 Oregon Agricultural Aggies football
- Conference: Northwest Conference, Pacific Coast Conference
- Record: 4–4–1 (1–1 Northwest, 1–3 PCC)
- Head coach: Homer Woodson Hargiss (2nd season)
- Captain: Henry "Butts" Reardon
- Home stadium: Bell Field

1919 Northwest Conference football standings
| | Conf. | | | | | Overall |
| Team | W | | L | | T | W | | L | | T |
|---|---|---|---|---|---|---|---|---|---|---|
| Washington State | 3 | – | 1 | – | 0 | 5 | – | 2 | – | 0 |
| Oregon | 2 | – | 1 | – | 0 | 5 | – | 2 | – | 0 |
| Oregon Agricultural | 1 | – | 1 | – | 0 | 4 | – | 4 | – | 0 |
| Idaho | 1 | – | 2 | – | 0 | 2 | – | 3 | – | 0 |
| Montana | 0 | – | 2 | – | 1 | 2 | – | 3 | – | 2 |
| Whitman | 0 | – | 0 | – | 1 | 0 | – | 2 | – | 1 |

1919 Pacific Coast Conference football standings
| | Conf. | | | | | Overall |
| Team | W | | L | | T | W | | L | | T |
|---|---|---|---|---|---|---|---|---|---|---|
| Oregon ^ + | 2 | – | 1 | – | 0 | 5 | – | 2 | – | 0 |
| Washington + | 2 | – | 1 | – | 0 | 5 | – | 1 | – | 0 |
| California | 2 | – | 2 | – | 0 | 6 | – | 2 | – | 1 |
| Washington State | 2 | – | 2 | – | 0 | 5 | – | 2 | – | 0 |
| Stanford | 1 | – | 1 | – | 0 | 4 | – | 3 | – | 0 |
| Oregon Agricultural | 1 | – | 3 | – | 0 | 4 | – | 4 | – | 1 |
+ – Conference co-champions; ^ – Selected as Rose Bowl representative

The 1919 Oregon Agricultural Aggies football teamrepresented Oregon Agricultural College (OAC)—now known as Oregon State University as a member of the Northwest Conference and the Pacific Coast Conference (PCC) during the 1919 college football season. In their second and final season under head coach Homer Woodson Hargiss, the Aggies compiled an overall record of 4–4–1 record and outscored their opponents by a combined total of 143 to 64. Oregon Agricultural had a record of 1–1 in Northwest Conference play, placing third, and 1–3 against PCC opponents, finishing last out of six teams. The Aggies played home games at Bell Field in Corvallis, Oregon. Raymond Archibald was the team captain.

== Schedule ==
| Date | Opponent | Site | Result | Attendance | Source |
|---|---|---|---|---|---|
| October 4 | O.A.C. alumni* | Bell Field; Corvallis, OR | T 0–0 | | |
| October 11 | Rooks* | Bell Field; Corvallis, OR | W 21–0 | | |
| October 18 | Pacific (OR)* | Bell Field; Corvallis, OR | W 46–6 | | |
| October 25 | Stanford | Bell Field; Corvallis, OR | L 6–14 | | |
| November 1 | at California | California Field; Berkeley, CA | L 14–21 | | |
| November 8 | Multnomah Athletic Club* | Bell Field; Corvallis, OR | L 0–14 | | |
| November 15 | at Oregon | Hayward Field; Eugene, OR (rivalry) | L 0–9 | 9,000 | |
| November 22 | vs. Washington State | Multnomah Field; Portland, OR | W 6–0 | 7,500 | |
| November 27 | at Gonzaga* | Fairgrounds; Spokane, WA | W 50–0 | | |
*Non-conference game
