= 1919 Southern Branch Cubs football team =

American college football season

1919 Southern Branch Cubs football
- Conference: Independent
- Record: 2–6
- Head coach: Fred Cozens (1st season)
- Home stadium: Moore Field

1919 Western college football independents records
	Conf.			Overall
Team	W	L	T	W		L		T
Hawaii		–		4	–	0	–	1
Arizona		–		7	–	1	–	0
Nevada		–		8	–	1	–	1
New Mexico		–		3	–	0	–	2
USC		–		4	–	1	–	0
Saint Mary's		–		3	–	3	–	1
New Mexico A&M		–		2	–	3	–	1
Gonzaga		–		2	–	3	–	0
Santa Clara		–		2	–	4	–	0
University Farm		–		2	–	5	–	0
South Branch		–		2	–	6	–	0
Pacific (CA)		–		1	–	4	–	0
Tempe Normal		–		0	–	2	–	0

The 1919 Southern Branch Cubs football team represented the Southern Branch of the University of California (later known as UCLA) in the 1919 college football season. The program, which was later known as the Bruins, was in its first year of existence. The Cubs were coached by Fred Cozens, who was also the basketball coach, and finished the season with a 2–6 record, with victories over Occidental Frosh team and the Los Angeles Junior College.

== Schedule ==
Date	Time	Opponent	Site	Result	Attendance	Source
October 3		at Manual Arts High School	Wilson Field; Los Angeles, CA	L 0–74		
October 10		at Hollywood High School	Hollywood High School; Los Angeles, CA	L 6–19		
October 17		at Bakersfield High School	Bakersfield High School; Bakersfield, CA	L 12–27		
October 24	3:30 p.m.	Occidental freshmen	Moore Field; Los Angeles, CA	W 7–2	250	
October 30		Los Angeles Junior College	Los Angeles High School; Los Angeles, CA	W 7–0		
November 7		USS Idaho (BB-42)	Moore Field; Los Angeles, CA	L 0–20		
November 14	4:00 p.m.	Los Angeles Junior College	Los Angeles High School; Los Angeles, CA	L 7–21	25	
November 21		at Occidental freshmen	Patterson Field; Los Angeles, CA	L 13–30		
All times are in Pacific time
