= 1919 Montana Grizzlies football team =

American college football season

1919 Montana Grizzlies football
- Conference: Northwest Conference
- Record: 2–3–2 (0–2–1 Northwest)
- Head coach: Bernie Bierman (1st season)
- Home stadium: Dornblaser Field

1919 Northwest Conference football standings
	Conf.					Overall
Team	W		L		T	W		L		T
Washington State	3	–	1	–	0	5	–	2	–	0
Oregon	2	–	1	–	0	5	–	2	–	0
Oregon Agricultural	1	–	1	–	0	4	–	4	–	0
Idaho	1	–	2	–	0	2	–	3	–	0
Montana	0	–	2	–	1	2	–	3	–	2
Whitman	0	–	0	–	1	0	–	2	–	1

The 1919 Montana Grizzlies football team represented the University of Montana as a member of the Northwest Conference during the 1919 college football season. Led by first-year head coach Bernie Bierman, the Grizzlies compiled an overall record of 2–3–2 with a mark of 0–2–1 in conference play. The team played home games at Dornblaser Field in Missoula, Montana.

== Schedule ==
Date	Opponent	Site	Result	Source
October 11	Montana Wesleyan*	Dornblaser Field; Missoula, MT	W 26–7	
October 18	at Utah Agricultural*	Logan, UT	L 0–47	
October 25	Montana Mines*	Dornblaser Field; Missoula, MT	W 28–7	
November 1	Whitman	Dornblaser Field; Missoula, MT	T 6–6	
November 8	at Idaho	MacLean Field; Moscow, ID (rivalry)	L 0–7	
November 15	at Montana State*	Bozeman, MT (rivalry)	T 6–6	
November 27	Washington State	Dornblaser Field; Missoula, MT	L 14–42	
*Non-conference game
