= Alpine, Skagit County, Washington =

Ghost town in Skagit County, Washington

Alpine, Washington
- Ghost town
- Location within Washington (state) Location within the United States
- Coordinates: 48.3206°N 122.0089°W
- Country: United States
- State: Washington
- County: Skagit
- Time zone: UTC-8 (Pacific (PST))
  - Summer (DST): UTC-7 (PDT)

Alpine was a village located on the shores of Lake Cavanaugh, in Skagit County, Washington. A very brief reference to it is found in An Illustrated History of Skagit and Snohomish Counties, by Elizan M. Wallace, published by Interstate Publishing Company, 1906 (pages 469–470). An in-depth book about Alpine and the settlers of Lake Cavanaugh, who began arriving in 1890, was published and copyrighted in 2009: Alpine On The Lake, by Allan Ray Wenzel, published by Classic Day Publishing, Seattle, Washington, 2009 (ISBN 978-1-59849-079-4, Library of Congress Number 2009938776).

There was another Alpine 50 miles south founded about the same time. That village was founded by Stanford University graduate Carl Lane Clemans and existed from 1894 until 1929. The village had a few homes, a schoolhouse, a post office, and a hotel. After the Stevens Pass Scenic Highway was built a mile away without any connection to Alpine, the village was abandoned in 1929.

== See also ==
- List of ghost towns in Washington
