= John F. McGough =

Biographical details
- Born: January 4, 1883; Oriskany Falls, New York, U.S.
- Died: April 14, 1962 (aged 79); Fort William Henry Harrison, Montana, U.S.

Playing career

Football
- 1906–1909: Colgate

Coaching career (HC unless noted)

Football
- 1916: Gonzaga
- 1919: New Mexico
- 1922: Montana Mines

Basketball
- 1916–1917: Gonzaga
- 1918–1919: New Mexico

Baseball
- 1919–1920: New Mexico

Head coaching record
- Overall: 9–7–2 (football); 6–9 (basketball); 6–5 (baseball)

John Francis McGough (January 4, 1883 – April 14, 1962) was an American football player and coach of football, basketball, and baseball. He served as the head football coach at Gonzaga University in 1916, the University of New Mexico in 1919, and the Montana School of Mines—now known as Montana Technological University—compiling a career college football head coaching record of 9–7–2. McGough was also the head basketball coach at Gonzaga during the 1916–17 season and at New Mexico in 1919, amassing a career college basketball record of 6–9. He was also the head baseball coach at New Mexico from 1919 to 1920, tallying a mark of 6–5. He was later an attorney in Montana.

== Coaching career ==
As basketball coach at Gonzaga, McGough compiled a record of 4–5. At New Mexico, his record was 2–4.

== Head coaching record ==
=== Football ===
Year	Team	Overall	Conference	Standing	Bowl/playoffs
Gonzaga Blue and White (Independent) (1916)
1916	Gonzaga	3–2			
Gonzaga:		3–2			
University of New Mexico (Independent) (1919)
1919	University of New Mexico	3–0–2			
University of New Mexico:		3–0–2			
Montana Mines Orediggers (Independent) (1922)
1922	Montana Mines	3–5			
Montana Mines:		3–5			
Total:		9–7–2			
