= 1919 New Mexico A&M Aggies football team =

American college football season

1919 New Mexico A&M Aggies football
- Conference: Independent
- Record: 2–3–1
- Head coach: Anthony Savage (1st season)

1919 Western college football independents records
	Conf.			Overall
Team	W	L	T	W		L		T
Hawaii		–		4	–	0	–	1
Arizona		–		7	–	1	–	0
Nevada		–		8	–	1	–	1
New Mexico		–		3	–	0	–	2
USC		–		4	–	1	–	0
Saint Mary's		–		3	–	3	–	1
New Mexico A&M		–		2	–	3	–	1
Gonzaga		–		2	–	3	–	0
Santa Clara		–		2	–	4	–	0
University Farm		–		2	–	5	–	0
South Branch		–		2	–	6	–	0
Pacific (CA)		–		1	–	4	–	0
Tempe Normal		–		0	–	2	–	0

The 1919 New Mexico A&M Aggies football team was an American football team that represented New Mexico College of Agriculture and Mechanical Arts (now known as New Mexico State University) during the 1919 college football season. In their first year under head coach Anthony Savage, the Aggies compiled a 2–3–1 record. The team played its home games on Miller Field.

== Schedule ==
Date	Opponent	Site	Result	Source
October 18	Fort Bliss "Buff and Yellow"	Mesilla Park, NM	L 0–6	
October 25	at 82nd Artillery (Fort Bliss)	El Paso, TX	W 27–6	
October 31	Arizona	Mesilla Park, NM	L 0–33	
November 8	New Mexico Mines	Mesilla Park, NM	W 54–0	
November 14	New Mexico Military	Mesilla Park, NM	T 0–0	
November 27	at New Mexico	University Field; Albuquerque, NM (rivalry)	L 2–24	
