= 1919 Tempe Normal Owls football team =

American college football season

1919 Tempe Normal Owls football
- Conference: Independent
- Record: 0–2
- Head coach: George E. Cooper (1st season)

1919 Western college football independents records
	Conf.			Overall
Team	W	L	T	W		L		T
Hawaii		–		4	–	0	–	1
Arizona		–		7	–	1	–	0
Nevada		–		8	–	1	–	1
New Mexico		–		3	–	0	–	2
USC		–		4	–	1	–	0
Saint Mary's		–		3	–	3	–	1
New Mexico A&M		–		2	–	3	–	1
Gonzaga		–		2	–	3	–	0
Santa Clara		–		2	–	4	–	0
University Farm		–		2	–	5	–	0
South Branch		–		2	–	6	–	0
Pacific (CA)		–		1	–	4	–	0
Tempe Normal		–		0	–	2	–	0

The 1919 Tempe Normal Owls football team was an American football team that represented Tempe Normal School (later renamed Arizona State University) as an independent during the 1919 college football season. In their first and only season under head coach George E. Cooper, the Owls compiled a 0–2 record and were outscored by their opponents by a combined total of 104 to 3. In the first game of the season, the team lost, 59–0, in the Arizona–Arizona State football rivalry.

== Schedule ==
Date	Opponent	Site	Result	Source
October 11	at Arizona	University Field; Tucson, AZ (rivalry)	L 0–59	
October 18	at Phoenix High School	High School Athletic Field; Phoenix, AZ	L 3–45	
