= 1919 USC Trojans football team =

American college football season

1919 USC Trojans football
- Conference: Independent
- Record: 4–1
- Head coach: Gus Henderson (1st season)
- Captain: John Fox
- Home stadium: Bovard Field

1919 Western college football independents records
| | Conf. | | | Overall |
| Team | W | L | T | W | | L | | T |
|---|---|---|---|---|---|---|---|---|
| Hawaii | | – | | 4 | – | 0 | – | 1 |
| Arizona | | – | | 7 | – | 1 | – | 0 |
| Nevada | | – | | 8 | – | 1 | – | 1 |
| New Mexico | | – | | 3 | – | 0 | – | 2 |
| USC | | – | | 4 | – | 1 | – | 0 |
| Saint Mary's | | – | | 3 | – | 3 | – | 1 |
| New Mexico A&M | | – | | 2 | – | 3 | – | 1 |
| Gonzaga | | – | | 2 | – | 3 | – | 0 |
| Santa Clara | | – | | 2 | – | 4 | – | 0 |
| University Farm | | – | | 2 | – | 5 | – | 0 |
| South Branch | | – | | 2 | – | 6 | – | 0 |
| Pacific (CA) | | – | | 1 | – | 4 | – | 0 |
| Tempe Normal | | – | | 0 | – | 2 | – | 0 |

The 1919 USC Trojans football team represented the University of Southern California (USC) in the 1919 college football season. In their first year under head coach Gus Henderson, the Trojans compiled a 4–1 record and outscored their opponents by a combined total of 87 to 21.

== Schedule ==
| Date | Opponent | Site | Result | Attendance | Source |
|---|---|---|---|---|---|
| October 25 | Pomona | Bovard Field; Los Angeles, CA | W 6–0 | 7,000 | |
| November 1 | Occidental | Bovard Field; Los Angeles, CA | W 27–0 | 5,000 | |
| November 8 | California | Bovard Field; Los Angeles, CA | L 13–14 | 9,000 | |
| November 15 | Utah | Bovard Field; Los Angeles, CA | W 28–7 | | |
| November 27 | Stanford | Bovard Field; Los Angeles, CA (rivalry) | W 13–0 | | |
