= 1919 Washington football team =

American college football season

1919 Washington football

PCC co-champion
- Conference: Pacific Coast Conference
- Record: 5–1 (2–1 PCC)
- Head coach: Claude J. Hunt (2nd season)
- Captain: Ervin Dailey
- Home stadium: Denny Field

1919 Pacific Coast Conference football standings
	Conf.					Overall
Team	W		L		T	W		L		T
Oregon ^ +	2	–	1	–	0	5	–	2	–	0
Washington +	2	–	1	–	0	5	–	1	–	0
California	2	–	2	–	0	6	–	2	–	1
Washington State	2	–	2	–	0	5	–	2	–	0
Stanford	1	–	1	–	0	4	–	3	–	0
Oregon Agricultural	1	–	3	–	0	4	–	4	–	1
+ – Conference co-champions; ^ – Selected as Rose Bowl representative

The 1919 Washington football team was an American football team that represented the University of Washington during the 1919 college football season. In its second, non-consecutive season under coach Claude J. Hunt, the team compiled a 5–1 record, was co-champion of the Pacific Coast Conference, and outscored its opponents by a combined total of 202 to 31. Ervin Dailey was the team captain.

The university's "Sun Dodgers" nickname was suggested in November 1919, but not officially adopted by the students until January 28, 1920.

== Schedule ==
Date	Opponent	Site	Result	Attendance	Source
October 18	USS New York*	Denny Field; Seattle, WA	W 35–0	3,000	
October 25	Whitman*	Denny Field; Seattle, WA	W 120–0	5,000	
November 1	Oregon	Denny Field; Seattle, WA (rivalry)	L 13–24	8,000	
November 8	Pacific Fleet*	Denny Field; Seattle, WA	W 14–0	2,500	
November 15	at Washington State	Rogers Field; Pullman, WA (rivalry)	W 13–7	8,000	
November 27	California	Denny Field; Seattle, WA	W 7–0	16,000	
*Non-conference game; Source:
