= 1919 Idaho Vandals football team =

American college football season

1919 Idaho Vandals football
- Conference: Northwest Conference
- Record: 2–3 (1–2 Northwest)
- Head coach: Ralph Hutchinson (1st season)
- Home stadium: MacLean Field

1919 Northwest Conference football standings
| | Conf. | | | | | Overall |
| Team | W | | L | | T | W | | L | | T |
|---|---|---|---|---|---|---|---|---|---|---|
| Washington State | 3 | – | 1 | – | 0 | 5 | – | 2 | – | 0 |
| Oregon | 2 | – | 1 | – | 0 | 5 | – | 2 | – | 0 |
| Oregon Agricultural | 1 | – | 1 | – | 0 | 4 | – | 4 | – | 0 |
| Idaho | 1 | – | 2 | – | 0 | 2 | – | 3 | – | 0 |
| Montana | 0 | – | 2 | – | 1 | 2 | – | 3 | – | 2 |
| Whitman | 0 | – | 0 | – | 1 | 0 | – | 2 | – | 1 |

The 1919 Idaho Vandals football team represented the University of Idaho as a member of the Northwest Conference during the 1919 college football season. Led by Ralph Hutchinson in his first and only season as head coach, the Vandals compiled an overall record of 3–5 with a mark of 1–2 in conference play, placing fourth in the Northwest Conference. The team played three home games at MacLean Field, on campus in Moscow, Idaho.

Idaho dropped a fifth consecutive game to Washington State in the Battle of the Palouse, falling 0–37 at Rogers Field in Pullman. Four years later, the Vandals won the first of three consecutive, their only three-peat in the rivalry series. Idaho opened with three losses, then won the final two games of the season.

== Schedule ==
| Date | Opponent | Site | Result | Source |
|---|---|---|---|---|
| October 18 | Oregon | MacLean Field; Moscow, ID | L 6–27 | |
| October 25 | at Utah* | Cummings Field; Salt Lake City, UT | L 0–20 | |
| November 1 | at Washington State | Rogers Field; Pullman, WA (Battle of the Palouse) | L 0–37 | |
| November 8 | Montana | MacLean Field; Moscow, ID (rivalry) | W 7–0 | |
| November 15 | at Gonzaga* | Fairgrounds field; Spokane, WA | W 13–7 | |
*Non-conference game
