= 1919 Hawaii Deans football team =

American college football season

1919 Hawaii Deans football
- Conference: Independent
- Record: 4–0–1
- Head coach: David L. Crawford (3rd season)
- Captain: Lionel Brash
- Home stadium: Moiliili Field, Cooke Field

1919 Western college football independents records
	Conf.			Overall
Team	W	L	T	W		L		T
Hawaii		–		4	–	0	–	1
Arizona		–		7	–	1	–	0
Nevada		–		8	–	1	–	1
New Mexico		–		3	–	0	–	2
USC		–		4	–	1	–	0
Saint Mary's		–		3	–	3	–	1
New Mexico A&M		–		2	–	3	–	1
Gonzaga		–		2	–	3	–	0
Santa Clara		–		2	–	4	–	0
University Farm		–		2	–	5	–	0
South Branch		–		2	–	6	–	0
Pacific (CA)		–		1	–	4	–	0
Tempe Normal		–		0	–	2	–	0

The 1919 Hawaii Deans football team represented the University of Hawaiʻi—now known as the University of Hawaiʻi at Mānoa–as an independent during the 1919 college football season. In their third and final season under head coach David L. Crawford, the Deans compiled a 4–0–1 record. Hawaii played home games at Moiliili Field and Cooke Field. The team were heralded as "the champions of the Hawaiian Islands."

== Schedule ==
Date	Time	Opponent	Site	Result	Attendance	Source
November 1	2:30 p.m.	vs. Outrigger Canoe Club	Alexander Field; Honolulu, Territory of Hawaii	T 6–6		
November 8	2:30 p.m.	Outrigger Canoe Club	Moiliili Field; Honolulu, Territory of Hawaii	W 27–7		
November 15	2:30 p.m.	Schofield Barracks Post team	Cooke Field; Honolulu, Territory of Hawaii	W 10–6		
November 29	3:30 p.m.	Luke Field	Moiliili Field; Honolulu, Territory of Hawaii	W 68–0		
December 6		Town Team	Moiliili Field; Honolulu, Territory of Hawaii	W 27–22	2,000	
All times are in Hawaii–Aleutian time

== Roster ==
Lionel Brash (captain), George Bromley, Robert Spencer, John Thompson, Norman King, Peter Hanohano, Harvey Hitchcock, Wilson Jacobson, Charles Lambert, Robert Macconel, Harold Harvey, Ezra Crane, T. Suzuki, Laurence McLane, Wm. Beers, K. Muratsuka
