= 1919 Oregon Webfoots football team =

American college football season

1919 Oregon Webfoots football
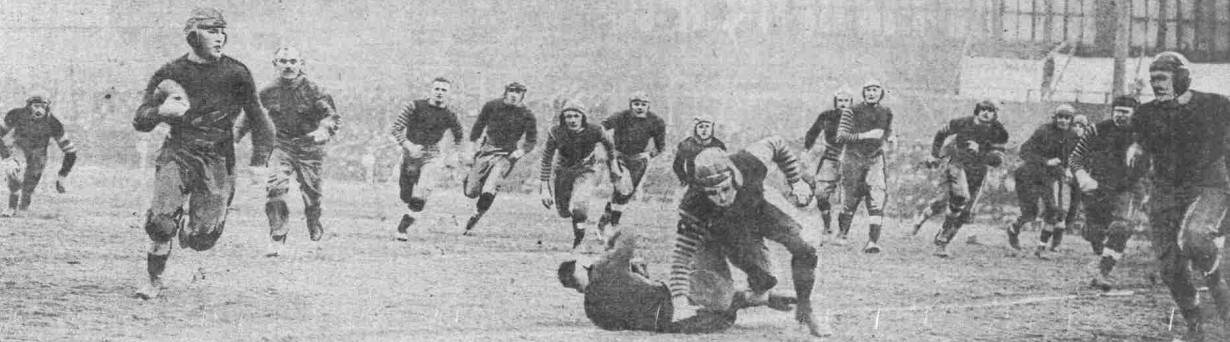

PCC co-champion

Rose Bowl, L 6–7 vs. Harvard
- Conference: Northwest Conference, Pacific Coast Conference
- Record: 5–2 (2–1 Northwest, 2–1 PCC)
- Head coach: Charles A. Huntington (2nd season)
- Captain: Everett Brandenberg
- Home stadium: Kincaid Field, Hayward Field, Multnomah Field

1919 Northwest Conference football standings
	Conf.					Overall
Team	W		L		T	W		L		T
Washington State	3	–	1	–	0	5	–	2	–	0
Oregon	2	–	1	–	0	5	–	2	–	0
Oregon Agricultural	1	–	1	–	0	4	–	4	–	0
Idaho	1	–	2	–	0	2	–	3	–	0
Montana	0	–	2	–	1	2	–	3	–	2
Whitman	0	–	0	–	1	0	–	2	–	1

1919 Pacific Coast Conference football standings
	Conf.					Overall
Team	W		L		T	W		L		T
Oregon ^ +	2	–	1	–	0	5	–	2	–	0
Washington +	2	–	1	–	0	5	–	1	–	0
California	2	–	2	–	0	6	–	2	–	1
Washington State	2	–	2	–	0	5	–	2	–	0
Stanford	1	–	1	–	0	4	–	3	–	0
Oregon Agricultural	1	–	3	–	0	4	–	4	–	1
+ – Conference co-champions; ^ – Selected as Rose Bowl representative

The 1919 Oregon Webfoots football team represented the University of Oregon as a member of the Northwest Conference and the Pacific Coast Conference (PCC) during the 1919 college football season. Led by second-year head coach Charles A. Huntington, the Webfoots compiled an overall record of 5–2 and lost to undefeated Harvard in the Rose Bowl on New Year's Day. Oregon had a record of 2–1 in both conferences, placing second in the Northwest Conference and sharing the PCC title with Washington.

Oregon played home games at Kincaid Field and Hayward Field in Eugene, Oregon, and Multnomah Field in Portland, Oregon. The inaugural game at Hayward Field was the rivalry against Oregon Agricultural on November 15. It hosted varsity football through 1966, and continues as an elite track and field venue.

== Schedule ==
Date	Time	Opponent	Site	Result	Attendance	Source
October 11		Multnomah Athletic Club*	Kincaid Field; Eugene, OR	W 23–0		
October 18		at Idaho	MacLean Field; Moscow, ID	W 27–6		
November 1		at Washington	Denny Field; Seattle, WA (rivalry)	W 24–13	8,000	
November 8		Washington State	Multnomah Field; Portland, OR	L 0–7	12,000	
November 15		Oregon Agricultural	Hayward Field; Eugene, OR (rivalry)	W 9–0	9,000	
November 27		at Multnomah Athletic Club*	Multnomah Field; Portland, OR	W 15–7		
January 1, 1920	2:30 p.m.	vs. Harvard*	Tournament Park; Pasadena, CA (Rose Bowl)	L 6–7	32,000–35,000	
*Non-conference game; All times are in Pacific time; Source:
