= 1919 Washington State Cougars football team =

American college football season

1919 Washington State Cougars football
- Conference: Northwest Conference, Pacific Coast Conference
- Record: 5–2 (3–1 Northwest, 2–2 PCC)
- Head coach: Gus Welch (1st season)
- Captain: Dick Hanley
- Home stadium: Rogers Field

1919 Northwest Conference football standings
	Conf.					Overall
Team	W		L		T	W		L		T
Washington State	3	–	1	–	0	5	–	2	–	0
Oregon	2	–	1	–	0	5	–	2	–	0
Oregon Agricultural	1	–	1	–	0	4	–	4	–	0
Idaho	1	–	2	–	0	2	–	3	–	0
Montana	0	–	2	–	1	2	–	3	–	2
Whitman	0	–	0	–	1	0	–	2	–	1

1919 Pacific Coast Conference football standings
	Conf.					Overall
Team	W		L		T	W		L		T
Oregon ^ +	2	–	1	–	0	5	–	2	–	0
Washington +	2	–	1	–	0	5	–	1	–	0
California	2	–	2	–	0	6	–	2	–	1
Washington State	2	–	2	–	0	5	–	2	–	0
Stanford	1	–	1	–	0	4	–	3	–	0
Oregon Agricultural	1	–	3	–	0	4	–	4	–	1
+ – Conference co-champions; ^ – Selected as Rose Bowl representative

The 1919 Washington State Cougars football team represented Washington State College—now known as Washington State University—as a member of the Northwest Conference and the Pacific Coast Conference (PCC) during the 1919 college football season. Led by first-year head coach Gus Welch, the Cougars compiled an overall record of 5–2. Washington State had a record of 3–1 in Northwest Conference play and 2–2 against PCC opponents, placing in a three-way tie for third.

This year marked the team's adoption of the "Cougars" nickname.

== Schedule ==
Date	Opponent	Site	Result	Attendance	Source
October 18	Multnomah Athletic Club*	Spokane Fairgrounds; Spokane, WA	W 49–0	2,500	
October 25	at California	California Field; Berkeley, CA	W 14–0		
November 1	Idaho	Rogers Field; Pullman, WA (rivalry)	W 37–0	3,000	
November 8	at Oregon	Multnomah Field; Portland, OR	W 7–0	12,000	
November 15	Washington	Rogers Field; Pullman, WA (rivalry)	L 7–13	8,000	
November 22	at Oregon Agricultural	Multnomah Field; Portland, OR	L 0–6	7,500	
November 27	at Montana	Dornblaser Field; Missoula, MT	W 42–14		
*Non-conference game
