= Pop McKale =

American collegiate athletics director and coach (1887–1967)

Biographical details
- Born: June 12, 1887; Lansing, Michigan, U.S.
- Died: June 1, 1967 (aged 79); Tucson, Arizona, U.S.

Playing career

Football
- 1906–1909: Albion

Baseball
- 1907–1910: Albion

Coaching career (HC unless noted)

Football
- 1914–1930: Arizona

Basketball
- 1914–1921: Arizona

Baseball
- 1915–1919: Arizona
- 1922–1949: Arizona

Administrative career (AD unless noted)
- 1914–1957: Arizona

Head coaching record
- Overall: 80–32–6 (football); 49–12 (basketball); 304–118–7 (baseball)
- Bowls: 0–1

James Fred "Pop" McKale (June 12, 1887 – June 1, 1967) was an American football and baseball player, coach of football, basketball, baseball, and track, and college athletics administrator. He is best known for his four-decade association with the University of Arizona. He served as athletic director at U of A from 1914 to 1957. He served as Arizona's head football coach from 1914 to 1930, compiling a record of 80–32–6. McKale was also the head basketball coach at Arizona from 1914 to 1921, tallying a mark of 49–12, and the head baseball coach at the school from 1915 to 1919 and again from 1922 to 1949, amassing a record of 304–118–7. McKale was inducted into the Arizona Sportsmen Hall of Fame in 1959 and was a charter member of the Arizona Sports Hall of Fame, inducted in 1976. The McKale Center, the University of Arizona's home basketball venue, was opened in 1973 and named in McKale's honor.

== Early life ==
McKale was born in Lansing, Michigan to William H. and Clara (Bateman) McKale on June 12, 1887. He graduated from Lansing High School in 1905. While enrolled at Albion College, McKale competed in baseball, football, and long jump. McKale was named a two-time All-State athlete in both football and baseball at Albion College. He helped the football team win a Michigan Intercollegiate Athletic Association championship in 1908 and served as the team's captain in 1908 and 1909. A four-year varsity letter winner in both baseball and football, McKale served as the student president of the MIAA in 1909–10. He graduated with a degree in history and chemistry in 1910.

As a student, McKale was offered a minor league baseball by the Minneapolis Millers. He instead decided to become a teacher and accepted a position in Superior, Wisconsin. The next year, McKale saw an advertisement for a teaching position at Tucson High School in Tucson, Arizona. The school principal, Harold Steele, was a fellow Albion alum and he hired McKale by telegram.

Following his arrival in September 1911, McKale taught history and served as the coach for all of Tucson High's athletic programs. At the time THS had no mascot so Pop, being from Wisconsin said, "We'll be the Badgers!" The school made the colors red and white and the THS Badger logo was copied from the Wisconsin Badger.

On Thanksgiving that year his football team defeated the University of Arizona junior varsity squad 11–0. After McKale's baseball team won a game against U of A's baseball team, Arizona students began petitioning their school to hire McKale. School officials obliged, and hired McKale on June 2, 1914.

McKale married Ada L. Sackett on July 31, 1915. The union produced three daughters: Elizabeth, Ruth, and Marian. McKale completed a Master of Education with a minor in law in 1919.

== Coaching career ==
Upon his arrival at the University of Arizona, McKale served as the school's athletic director and coach for the varsity football and basketball teams. In 1915 he added track and baseball to his coaching duties. He coached the track and basketball teams for 7 seasons. As a basketball coach, McKale achieved a record of 49 wins and 12 losses, going undefeated during the 1914–15, 1915–16, and 1920–21 seasons (season records of 9–0, 5–0, and 7–0 respectively). McKale coached baseball from 1915 to 1949, achieving a record of 302 wins and 102 losses.

As football coach, McKale earned a record of 80 wins, 32 losses and 6 ties between 1914 and 1930. It was in this role that he was also involved in the creation of several of the University of Arizona's athletic traditions. The school's nickname comes from a 1914 game coached by McKale against Occidental College. Following the game a Los Angeles Times reporter wrote "“the Arizona men showed the fight of wildcats…” The school motto came over a decade later. On October 3, 1926, John "Button" Salmon was involved in an automobile accident which caused severe damage to his spine. Salmon was the student body president, starting quarterback, catcher for the baseball team, Sigma Nu member, and member of multiple student honorary organizations. McKale visited Salmon every day in the hospital until Salmon's death on October 19. During his last visit, McKale asked if Salmon had a message for the football team. Salmon replied "Tell them ... tell them to bear down." McKale told the football team of Salmon's message during a pregame talk before their next game. The phrase "Bear Down" became the school's motto in 1927 following a student-led proposal.

As athletic director, McKale oversaw the construction of most of U of A's initial athletic infrastructure. The university's first basketball arena, the Men's Gymnasium (now Bear Down Gym), was completed in 1926. Arizona Stadium in turn was opened in 1929 and regularly sold out its 27,000 seats. McKale retired in 1957 due to the school's then mandatory retirement age of 70.

Outside of athletics, McKale pursued several other activities. He founded the university's Sigma Nu chapter in 1918. McKale was also interested in history, with his primary focus upon George Washington and Abraham Lincoln. His book, Abraham Lincoln: The Politician, was published in 1957.

McKale received a number of honors for his athletic accomplishments. He was inducted into the Arizona Sportsmen Hall of Fame in 1959, became a charter member of the Arizona Sports Hall of Fame in 1976, and was inducted into the Pima County Sports Hall of Fame in 1996. McKale Memorial Center is named in his honor. The University of Arizona also named a street (since renamed after Fred Enke) and the school's aquatic center (since renamed for a sponsor that provided funds to refurbish the center) after him.

McKale died from a heart attack on June 1, 1967.

== Head coaching record ==
=== Football ===
Year	Team	Overall	Conference	Standing	Bowl/playoffs
Arizona Wildcats (Independent) (1914–1930)
1914	Arizona	4–1			
1915	Arizona	5–3			
1916	Arizona	5–3			
1917	Arizona	3–2			
1918	No team—World War I				
1919	Arizona	7–1			
1920	Arizona	6–1			
1921	Arizona	7–2			L San Diego East-West Christmas Classic
1922	Arizona	6–3			
1923	Arizona	5–3			
1924	Arizona	2–4			
1925	Arizona	3–3–1			
1926	Arizona	5–1–1			
1927	Arizona	4–2–1			
1928	Arizona	5–1–2			
1929	Arizona	7–1			
1930	Arizona	6–1–1			
Arizona:		80–32–6			
Total:		80–32–6			
