= 1919 Stanford football team =

American college football season

1919 Stanford football
- Conference: Pacific Coast Conference
- Record: 4–3 (1–1 PCC)
- Head coach: Bob Evans (1st season)
- Home stadium: Stanford Field

1919 Pacific Coast Conference football standings
	Conf.					Overall
Team	W		L		T	W		L		T
Oregon ^ +	2	–	1	–	0	5	–	2	–	0
Washington +	2	–	1	–	0	5	–	1	–	0
California	2	–	2	–	0	6	–	2	–	1
Washington State	2	–	2	–	0	5	–	2	–	0
Stanford	1	–	1	–	0	4	–	3	–	0
Oregon Agricultural	1	–	3	–	0	4	–	4	–	1
+ – Conference co-champions; ^ – Selected as Rose Bowl representative

The 1919 Stanford football team represented Stanford University in the 1919 college football season.

== Season summary ==
This was the first time Stanford had fielded a football team since 1905. From 1905 to 1917, Stanford played rugby in place of football. In 1918, Stanford did not field an official team due to World War I, though an unofficial squad made up of volunteers from the Students' Army Training Corps stationed at Stanford (some of whom were not Stanford students) hurriedly organized to play several games, all blowout losses.

Bob Evans, who had coached Stanford men's basketball team the previous season, was named coach of the football team to go along with his basketball coaching duties. In his only season as football coach, Evans led the team to a 4–3 overall record.

In their first conference game in the Pacific Coast Conference, Stanford won its first-ever game against Oregon Agricultural College (now Oregon State); the team lost its other conference game, the Big Game against rival California.

== Schedule ==
Date	Opponent	Site	Result	Source
October 15	USS Boston*	Stanford Field; Stanford, CA	W 78–0	
October 18	Olympic Club*	Stanford Field; Stanford, CA	L 0–13	
October 25	at Oregon Agricultural	Bell Field; Corvallis, OR	W 14–6	
November 1	Saint Mary's*	Stanford Field; Stanford, CA	W 34–0	
November 8	Santa Clara*	Stanford Field; Stanford, CA	W 13–0	
November 22	California	Stanford Field; Stanford, CA (Big Game)	L 10–14	
November 27	USC*	Bovard Field; Los Angeles, CA (rivalry)	L 0–13	
*Non-conference game
