= Harry P. Cross =

American football player and coach (1873–1955)

Biographical details
- Born: September 29, 1873; South Kingstown, Rhode Island, U.S.
- Died: March 12, 1955 (aged 81); Miami Beach, Florida, U.S.

Playing career
- 1893–1895: Yale
- Position: Center

Coaching career (HC unless noted)
- 1896: Stanford
- 1898: Stanford

Head coaching record
- Overall: 7–4–2

Harry Parsons Cross (September 29, 1873 – March 12, 1955) was an American college football player and coach.

== Athletic and coaching career ==
Cross played center for Yale University's football team from 1893 to 1895. He was also an accomplished track and field athlete, competing in the hammer throw. In 1896, he was ranked as the second-best hammer thrower behind James Mitchel.

In 1896, Cross became the head football coach at Stanford, guiding the team to a 2–1–1 record and a Big Game victory over Cal. He coached the team again in 1898, earning a 5–3–1 record.

== After football ==
Cross graduated from Harvard Law School in 1900 and settled in Providence, Rhode Island, where he established a law firm and worked as an assistant attorney general for the state of Rhode Island. He died in 1955.

== Head coaching record ==
Year	Team	Overall	Conference	Standing	Bowl/playoffs
Stanford (Independent) (1896)
1896	Stanford	2–1–1			
Stanford (Independent) (1898)
1898	Stanford	5–3–1			
Stanford:		7–4–2			
Total:		7–4–2			

== See also ==
- List of college football head coaches with non-consecutive tenure
