= James F. Lanagan =

American sports coach and lawyer (1878–1937)

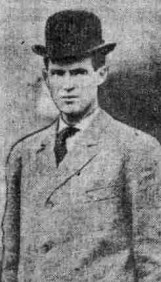
- Lanagan, c. 1906

Biographical details
- Born: November 16, 1878; Paris, Kentucky, U.S.
- Died: August 7, 1937 (aged 58); Applegate, California, U.S.

Playing career

Baseball
- 1897–1900: Stanford

Coaching career (HC unless noted)

Football
- 1903–1905: Stanford

Rugby
- 1906–1908: Stanford

Baseball
- 1906–1907: Stanford

Head coaching record
- Overall: 23–2–4 (football); 26–8–1 (rugby); 9–19–2 (baseball)

Accomplishments and honors

Records
- Highest win percentage of a multi-season football coach in Stanford history (.862)

James Francis Lanagan (November 16, 1878 – August 7, 1937) was an American football, rugby, and baseball coach at Stanford University.

Lanagan played college baseball at Stanford from 1897 to 1900. In 1902, he married Clara Earl, a fellow member of the Stanford Class of 1900.

In 1903, despite never having played football, Lanagan was selected as Stanford's head football coach, and coached the team for three years, compiling an overall record of 23–2–4.

Following the 1905 season, Stanford, responding like other American universities to concerns about the violence in football, dropped football in favour of rugby from 1906 to 1917. Despite having no knowledge of the sport, Lanagan was retained as the rugby coach, spending time in Vancouver, British Columbia and Australia to study the sport. In his first season, the team ended with a 6–2–1 season. Lanagan remained as rugby coach for two more seasons. He also served as Stanford's baseball coach from 1906 to 1907.

Lanagan attended Stanford Law School from 1905 to 1907. He resigned from coaching in 1908 to focus on his law practice.

During World War I, Lanagan was a major in the United States Army, fighting in France, where he contracted a lung disease that would eventually result in his death two decades later.

== Head coaching record ==
=== Football ===
Year	Team	Overall	Conference	Standing	Bowl/playoffs
Stanford (Independent) (1903–1905)
1903	Stanford	8–0–3			
1904	Stanford	7–2–1			
1905	Stanford	8–0			
Stanford:		23–2–4			
Total:		23–2–4			
