= Carl L. Clemans =

American football player and coach (1871–1941)

Carl Lane Clemans
Biographical details
- Born: May 30, 1871; Manchester, Iowa, U.S.
- Died: October 7, 1941 (aged 70); Snohomish, Washington, U.S.

Playing career
- 1891–1892: Stanford
- Position: Fullback

Coaching career (HC unless noted)
- 1897: Washington
- 1902: Stanford

Head coaching record
- Overall: 7–3

Carl Lane "Clem" Clemans (May 30, 1871 – October 7, 1941) was an American college football player and coach. He served as the head coach at the University of Washington in 1897 and at Stanford University in 1902, compiling a career record of 7–3.

Clemans played college football at Stanford in its first two years of existence, from 1891 to 1892, and served as the team's first captain. Clemans played in the first two games of what would become the Big Game between Stanford and Cal, and scored the first two touchdowns in that series. After his victory he was received personally by University founders Senator Leland and Jane Stanford.

Clemans was a member of the "Pioneer Class" of Stanford University. He was the first president of the Student Cooperative Association that organized the first campus bookstore. Clemans was also notable as the founder of the Stanford Beta Chi chapter of the Sigma Nu fraternity, which Sigma Nu's first major west coast chapter. In that role he organized the building of the first fraternity house on the Stanford campus, negotiating the land lease directly with Leland and Jane Stanford. He subsequently organized the University of California, Berkeley Beta Psi chapter.

Clemans left California for Washington state where he establish the lumber mill village of Alpine, Washington and spent the rest of his life there.

== Head coaching record ==
Year	Team	Overall	Conference	Standing	Bowl/playoffs
Washington (Independent) (1897)
1897	Washington	1–2			
Washington:		1–2			
Stanford (Independent) (1902)
1902	Stanford	6–1			
Stanford:		6–1			
Total:		7–3			
