= 1906–1917 Stanford rugby teams =

American college football seasons

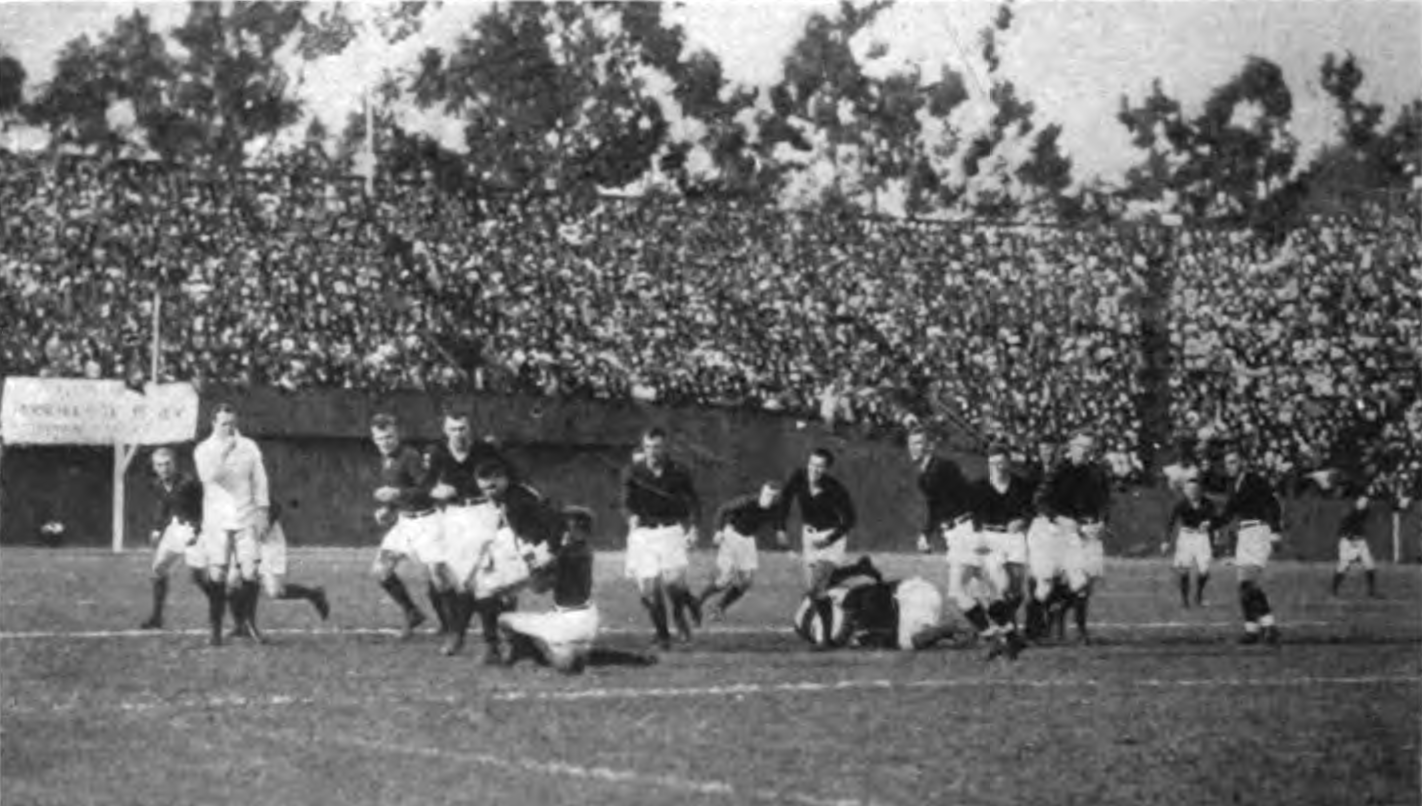
The Big Game between Stanford and California was played under the rugby union rules from 1906 to 1914. Pictured here, one of the last games between both schools before they switched to American football again

The Stanford rugby teams of 1906 to 1917 represented Stanford University as the school's only football program during those years, replacing American football with rugby union. The school had played American football from 1892 to 1905, but in 1906, concerned with the growing levels of violence in football, Stanford and other universities changed to rugby. Stanford played twelve seasons of rugby, during which it played other college teams, club teams from the United States, Canada, and Australia, as well as the New Zealand national team and Australia national team. Despite the team's success, it became clear that other schools were not adopting rugby in large numbers, and after rival California returned to football in 1915, Stanford faced a limited number of potential opponents; and after a year of playing neither sport officially due to World War I, the school returned to American football in 1919.

== Switch to rugby ==
American football in the early 1900s had become increasingly violent; with no forward pass, the ball carrier would be typically pushed and pulled up the field by his own players in massive formations that often resulted in serious injuries. In 1905, 18 deaths, three at the college level, were attributed to football; 159 serious injuries were also reported, 88 at the college level.

Reform was demanded by such voices as U.S. President Theodore Roosevelt, who decried the brutality and foul play of the game, and called a meeting of school presidents to discuss the issue. As a result, before the next season began, new rules were put in place to discourage such play. The forward pass was also introduced to open up the game and reduce the role of dangerous mass formations. Despite the planned changes, a number of universities banned the sport for the coming year, including Columbia, NYU, and Northwestern.

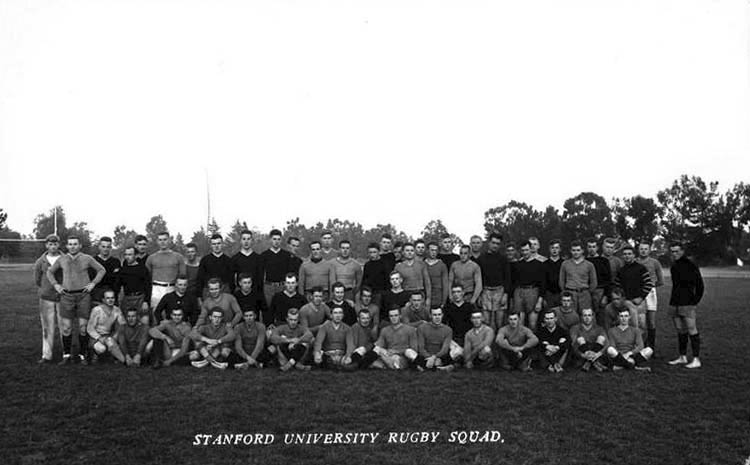
The Stanford University team that played the All Blacks in 1913

Several universities on the West Coast, led by California and Stanford, replaced the sport with rugby. At the time, the future of football was very much in doubt and these schools believed that rugby would eventually be adopted nationwide. Other schools that made the switch included Nevada, St. Mary's, Santa Clara, and USC (in 1911). However, due to the perception that West Coast football was inferior to the game played on the East Coast anyway, East Coast and Midwest teams shrugged off the loss of the teams and continued playing football. With no nationwide movement, the available pool of rugby teams to play remained small. The schools scheduled games against local club teams and reached out to rugby powers in Australia, New Zealand, and especially, due to its proximity, Canada. The annual Big Game between Stanford and California continued as rugby, with the winner invited by the British Columbia Rugby Union to a tournament in Vancouver over the Christmas holidays, with the winner of that tournament receiving the Cooper Keith Trophy.

== Return to football ==
In 12 seasons of rugby, Stanford was remarkably successful: the team had three undefeated seasons, three one-loss seasons, and an overall record of 94 wins, 20 losses, and 3 ties for a winning percentage of .816. However, after a few years, the school began to feel the isolation of its newly adopted sport, which was not spreading as many had hoped. Students and alumni began to clamor for a return to football to allow wider intercollegiate competition. The pressure at rival California was stronger (especially as the school had not been as successful in the Big Game as they had hoped), and in 1915 California returned to football. As reasons for the change, the school cited football rule changes, the overwhelming desire of students and supporters to play football, interest in playing other East Coast and Midwest schools, and a patriotic desire to play an "American" game.

California's return to football increased the pressure on Stanford to also change back in order to maintain the rivalry. Stanford played its 1915, 1916, and 1917 "Big Games" as rugby against Santa Clara and California's football "Big Game" in those years was against Washington, but both schools desired to restore the old traditions. The onset of World War I gave Stanford an out: in 1918, the Stanford campus was designated as the Students' Army Training Corps headquarters for all of California, Nevada, and Utah, and the commanding officer, Sam M. Parker, decreed that football was the appropriate athletic activity to train soldiers and rugby was dropped.

After the war, Stanford resumed its football program and relegated rugby to a minor sport. Several Stanford rugby players who played during those years—including Daniel Carroll, Dink Templeton, Morris Kirksey, Erwin Righter, John Patrick, and Charles Doe—went on to win a gold medal for the United States in rugby at the 1920 Summer Olympics.

== Season results ==
=== 1906 season ===
1906 Stanford rugby football
- Conference: Independent
- Record: 6–2–1
- Head coach: James F. Lanagan (1st season)
- Home ground: Stanford Field

In its first season of rugby, Stanford retained head football coach James F. Lanagan as its first rugby coach. Lanagan had coached the football team for three years, including an undefeated 1905 season. With no experience playing or coaching rugby, Lanagan initially offered his resignation, but Stanford insisted he stay on, so he traveled to Vancouver, British Columbia to study the sport. Stanford won its first five games, including two wins over a visiting club team from Vancouver. As winners of the first Big Game against California played as rugby, Stanford competed against Vancouver-area club teams for the Cooper Keith Trophy, losing two games and tying one.

==== Schedule ====
Date	Opponent	Site	Result
October 20	Nevada	Stanford Field; Stanford, California	W 11–0
October 27	vs. Pomona	Los Angeles, California	W 26–0
October 31	Vancouver Club	Stanford Field; Stanford, California	W 5–3
November 3	Vancouver Club	Stanford Field; Stanford, California	W 16–6
November 10	at California	California Field; Berkeley, California (16th Big Game)	W 6–3
December 25	at Vancouver Club	Vancouver, British Columbia	L 9–11
December 29	at Vancouver Club	Vancouver, British Columbia	L 0–3
January 1, 1907	at Vancouver Club	Vancouver, British Columbia	T 3–3
January 5, 1907	vs. Victoria Club	Seattle, Washington	W 11–0

=== 1907 season ===
1907 Stanford rugby football
- Conference: Independent
- Record: 8–4
- Head coach: James F. Lanagan (2nd season)
- Home ground: Stanford Field

In Stanford's second season of rugby, Jimmy Lanagan returned as coach and the team finished 8–4. Stanford continued its series with Nevada, Vancouver, and Victoria and added games against Bay Area club team the Barbarians and a Los Angeles club called the Castaways. Stanford won its second Big Game rugby match, earning a second straight tournament in British Columbia.

==== Schedule ====
Date	Opponent	Site	Result
September 28	Barbarians Club (San Francisco)	Stanford Field; Stanford, California	W 10–6
October 5	Castaways Club (Los Angeles)	Stanford Field; Stanford, California	W 15–11
October 18	vs. Barbarians Club (San Francisco)	Los Angeles, California	W 16–13
October 23	vs. Nevada	Los Angeles, California	W 31–0
October 28	vs. Barbarians Club (San Francisco)	Los Angeles, California	L 6–13
October 30	vs. Vancouver Club	Los Angeles, California	W 23–12
November 2	vs. Vancouver Club	Los Angeles, California	W 5–3
November 9	California	Stanford Field; Stanford, California (17th Big Game)	W 21–11
December 25	at Vancouver Club	Vancouver, British Columbia	L 0–3
December 28	at Vancouver Club	Vancouver, British Columbia	W 3–0
January 1, 1908	at Vancouver Club	Vancouver, British Columbia	L 5–9
January 4, 1908	at Victoria Club	Victoria, British Columbia	L 3–12

=== 1908 season ===
1908 Stanford rugby football
- Conference: Independent
- Record: 12–2
- Head coach: James F. Lanagan (3rd season)
- Home ground: Stanford Field

Lanagan returned for his final year as Stanford's coach and the team finished 12–2, winning not only its third consecutive Big Game, but also going on to win the Cooper Keith Trophy in the end-of-season Vancouver tournament. Stanford added two games against San Francisco's Olympic Club and played a final game against the Australian national team, the Wallabies.

==== Schedule ====
Date	Opponent	Site	Result
September 19	Barbarians Club (San Francisco)	Stanford Field; Stanford, California	W 22–0
September 26	Olympic Club	Stanford Field; Stanford, California	W 28–0
October 3	Barbarians Club (San Francisco)	Stanford Field; Stanford, California	W 24–0
October 10	Olympic Club	Stanford Field; Stanford, California	W 12–3
October 17	Barbarians Club (San Francisco)	Stanford Field; Stanford, California	W 28–3
October 24	at Nevada	Reno, Nevada	W 14–0
October 31	at Nevada	Reno, Nevada	W 26–0
November 4	Vancouver Club	Stanford Field; Stanford, California	L 3–11
November 7	Vancouver Club	Stanford Field; Stanford, California	W 11–3
November 14	at California	California Field; Berkeley, California (18th Big Game)	W 12–3
December 25	at Vancouver Club	Brockton Oval; Vancouver, British Columbia	W 11–0
December 29	at Vancouver Club	Brockton Oval; Vancouver, British Columbia	W 10–3
January 1, 1909	at Vancouver Club	Brockton Oval; Vancouver, British Columbia	W 16–10
February 5, 1909	Australia Wallabies	Stanford Field; Stanford, California	L 3–13

=== 1909 season ===
1909 Stanford rugby football
- Conference: Independent
- Record: 8–1
- Head coach: George J. Presley (1st season)
- Home ground: Stanford Field

Following Lanagan's departure, George Presley was named Stanford's new rugby coach. Presley played one year of rugby under Lanagan in 1906 and had been an assistant coach in 1907 and 1908. Presley also coached Stanford's baseball team. Stanford won its first eight games—seven by shutout—but then lost Big Game for the first time in seven years.

==== Schedule ====
Date	Opponent	Site	Result
September 18	Barbarians Club (San Francisco)	Stanford Field; Stanford, California	W 16–0
September 25	Olympic Club	Stanford Field; Stanford, California	W 3–0
October 2	Barbarians Club (San Francisco)	Stanford Field; Stanford, California	W 11–0
October 9	Olympic Club	Stanford Field; Stanford, California	W 15–0
October 23	at Castaways Club (Los Angeles)	Los Angeles, California	W 41–0
October 30	Reliance Club	Stanford Field; Stanford, California	W 59–0
November 3	Vancouver Club	Stanford Field; Stanford, California	W 56–0
November 6	Vancouver Club	Stanford Field; Stanford, California	W 19–3
November 13	California	Stanford Field; Stanford, California (19th Big Game)	L 13–19

=== 1910 season ===
1910 Stanford rugby football
- Conference: Independent
- Record: 7–1
- Head coach: George J. Presley (2nd season)
- Home ground: Stanford Field

In Presley's second year as coach, Stanford was led by Ben Erb and Jim Arrell. The season was almost identical to the previous year: the team won its first seven games by shutout, and then lost Big Game to undefeated California. Stanford led in that game 6–0, but did not score again as California won 25–6. This Big Game is recognized as the first intercollegiate game to feature card stunts.

==== Schedule ====
Date	Opponent	Site	Result
September 17	Olympic Club	Stanford Field; Stanford, California	W 4–0
September 24	Barbarians Club (San Francisco)	Stanford Field; Stanford, California	W 21–0
October 1	Olympic Club	Stanford Field; Stanford, California	W 19–0
October 8	Barbarians Club (San Francisco)	Stanford Field; Stanford, California	W 34–0
October 22	Nevada	Stanford Field; Stanford, California	W 8–0
October 29	Barbarians Club (San Francisco)	Stanford Field; Stanford, California	W 60–0
November 5	Olympic Club	Stanford Field; Stanford, California	W 27–0
November 12	at California	California Field; Berkeley, California (20th Big Game)	L 6–25

=== 1911 season ===
1911 Stanford rugby football
- Conference: Independent
- Record: 10–3
- Head coach: George J. Presley (3rd season)
- Home ground: Stanford Field

In the 1911 season, Stanford went 10–3 and added USC to the schedule, as the school dropped football in favor of rugby.

==== Schedule ====
Date	Opponent	Site	Result
September 16	Barbarians Club (San Francisco)	Stanford Field; Stanford, California	W 23–3
September 23	Olympic Club	Stanford Field; Stanford, California	W 19–0
September 30	Barbarians Club (San Francisco)	Stanford Field; Stanford, California	W 31–3
October 7	Olympic Club	Stanford Field; Stanford, California	W 16–0
October 14	Nevada	Stanford Field; Stanford, California	W 41–0
October 21	USC	Stanford Field; Stanford, California	W 6–3
October 28	Olympic Club	Stanford Field; Stanford, California	W 39–3
November 1	British Columbia	Stanford Field; Stanford, California	W 27–3
November 4	British Columbia	Stanford Field; Stanford, California	L 5–6
November 11	California	Stanford Field; Stanford, California (21st Big Game)	L 3–21
	at Vancouver Club	Vancouver, British Columbia	L 6–13
	at Vancouver Club	Vancouver, British Columbia	W 10–5
	at Vancouver Club	Vancouver, British Columbia	W 9–0

=== 1912 season ===
1912 Stanford rugby football
- Conference: Independent
- Record: 5–3–1
- Head coach: George J. Presley (4th season)
- Home ground: Stanford Field

In Presley's last year as coach, Stanford finished with a 5–3–1 record, its worst record of the rugby era. Stanford avoided a fourth straight loss in the Big Game by tying California. Despite an outstanding 30–8–1 overall record as coach, coach Presley was 0–3–1 against the Bears.

==== Schedule ====
Date	Opponent	Site	Result
September 28	Barbarians Club (San Francisco)	Stanford Field; Stanford, California	W 12–0
October 5	Olympic Club	Stanford Field; Stanford, California	W 17–0
October 12	Australian Waratahs	Stanford Field; Stanford, California	L 0–6
October 16	Australian Waratahs	Stanford Field; Stanford, California	W 13–12
October 19	at USC	Los Angeles, California	W 14–0
October 23	Santa Clara	Stanford Field; Stanford, California	L 10–15
October 26	Barbarians Club (San Francisco)	Stanford Field; Stanford, California	L 0–6
November 2	Olympic Club	Stanford Field; Stanford, California	W 19–0
November 11	at California	California Field; Berkeley, California (22nd Big Game)	T 3–3

=== 1913 season ===
1913 Stanford rugby football
- Conference: Independent
- Record: 8–3
- Head coach: Floyd C. Brown (1st season)
- Home ground: Stanford Field

Floyd C. Brown succeeded George Presley as coach. Like Presley, Brown had played for and served as an assistant under the previous coach. Stanford finished with an 8–3 record, including its first Big Game win in five years, led by Danny Carroll, who had won a gold medal in the 1908 Summer Olympics as a member of the Australia national rugby union team and who was now earning a degree in geology from Stanford. Stanford played its final rugby game against USC, who returned to American football the next year, and suffered two blowout losses to the famed New Zealand All Blacks, who were on a North American tour.

==== Schedule ====
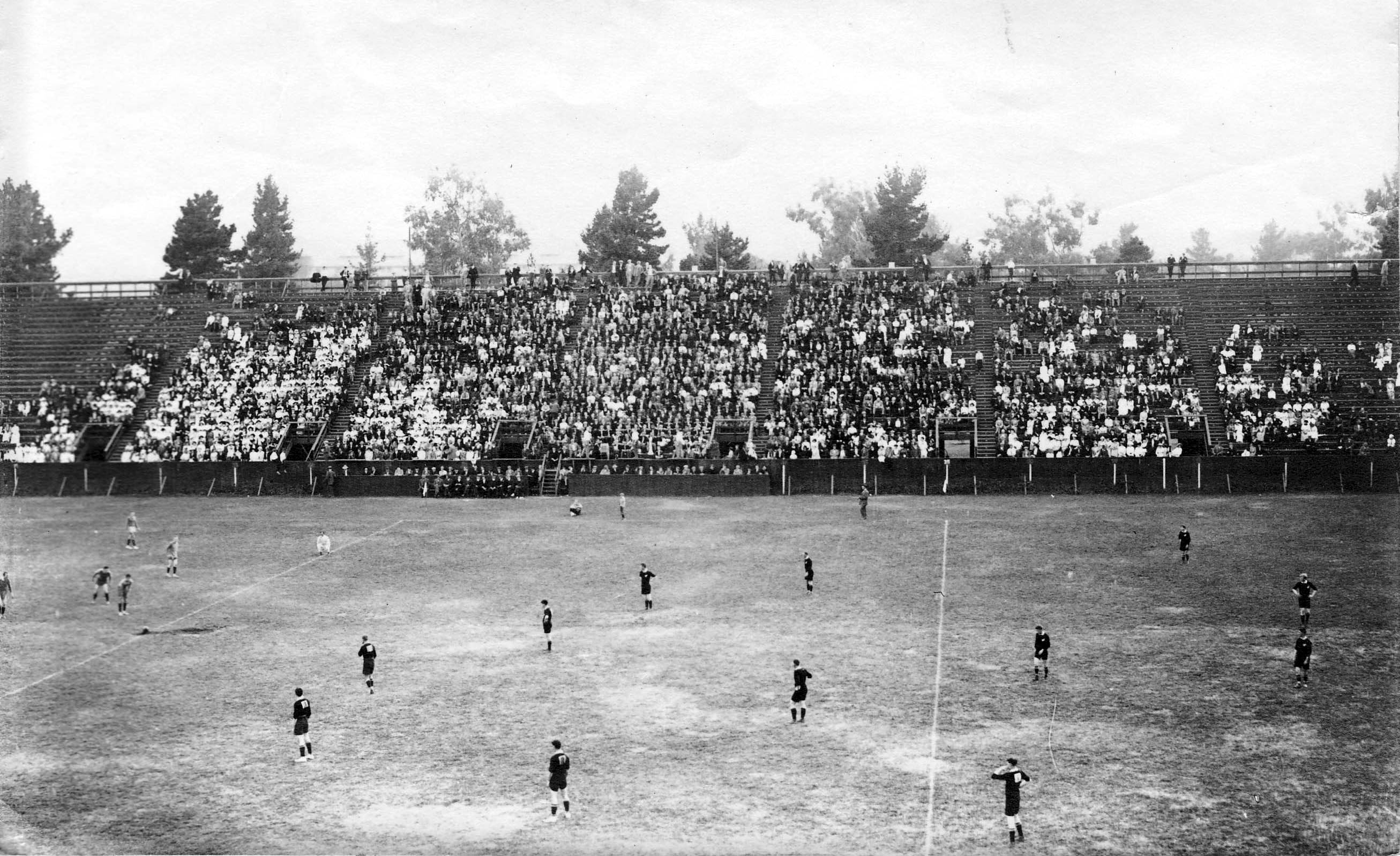
Stanford playing the 2nd game v the All Blacks on October 18

Date	Opponent	Site	Result
September 13	Olympic Club	Stanford Field; Stanford, California	L 3–5
September 20	Barbarians Club (San Francisco)	Stanford Field; Stanford, California	W 88–3
September 27	U.C. Club	Stanford Field; Stanford, California	W 13–3
October 4	Barbarians Club (San Francisco)	Stanford Field; Stanford, California	W 18–0
October 11	Olympic Club	Stanford Field; Stanford, California	W 29–3
October 15	New Zealand All Blacks	Stanford Field; Stanford, California	L 0–54
October 18	New Zealand All Blacks	Stanford Field; Stanford, California	L 0–56
October 25	Barbarians Club (San Francisco)	Stanford Field; Stanford, California	W 21–5
November 1	Olympic Club	Stanford Field; Stanford, California	W 19–12
November 8	California	Stanford Field; Stanford, California (23rd Big Game)	W 13–8
November 22	at USC	Los Angeles, California	W 10–0

=== 1914 season ===
1914 Stanford rugby football
- Conference: Independent
- Record: 10–0
- Head coach: Floyd C. Brown (2nd season)
- Home ground: Stanford Field

Brown's second year as coach was the best in Stanford rugby history: the team was undefeated entering the Big Game at California, who was also undefeated. A record crowd of 26,000 turned out to see Stanford defeat the Bears, 26–8. This would be the last Big Game for several years as California returned to football for the 1915 season. Despite Stanford's success in rugby, the previous year's humiliating defeats to the All Blacks and the switch by rivals USC and California to football intensified the sentiment for Stanford to switch back as well.

==== Schedule ====
Date	Opponent	Site	Result
September 12	Olympic Club	Stanford Field; Stanford, California	W 17–0
September 19	Barbarians Club (San Francisco)	Stanford Field; Stanford, California	W 31–3
September 26	University Alumni	Stanford Field; Stanford, California	W 61–8
October 3	Barbarians Club (San Francisco)	Stanford Field; Stanford, California	W 19–4
October 10	Olympic Club	Stanford Field; Stanford, California	W 19–5
October 17	Titans Club	Stanford Field; Stanford, California	W 35–6
October 24	Santa Clara	Stanford Field; Stanford, California	W 13–0
October 31	University Alumni	Stanford Field; Stanford, California	W 31–3
November 7	Olympic Club	Stanford Field; Stanford, California	W 36–6
November 14	at California	California Field; Berkeley, California (24th Big Game)	W 26–8

=== 1915 season ===
1915 Stanford rugby football
- Conference: Independent
- Record: 10–0–1
- Head coach: Floyd C. Brown (3rd season)
- Home ground: Stanford Field

By 1915, there was only one other U.S. college playing intercollegiate rugby: Santa Clara. The rest of Stanford's schedule was made up of local club and all star teams. The team played to a scoreless tie with the Olympic Club team to start the season, but recovered to win the rest of the games on the schedule.

==== Schedule ====
Date	Opponent	Site	Result
September 11	Olympic Club	Stanford Field; Stanford, California	T 0–0
September 18	Barbarians Club (San Francisco)	Stanford Field; Stanford, California	W 31–6
September 25	Titan Club	Stanford Field; Stanford, California	W 18–0
October 2	Olympic Club	Stanford Field; Stanford, California	W 48–13
October 9	Barbarians Club (San Francisco)	Stanford Field; Stanford, California	W 80–0
October 16	Olympic Club	Stanford Field; Stanford, California	W 49–8
October 20	Palo Alto Athletic Club	Stanford Field; Stanford, California	W 28–3
October 23	Palo Alto Athletic Club	Stanford Field; Stanford, California	W 36–18
October 30	Southern California All-Stars	Stanford Field; Stanford, California	W 21–5
November 6	Olympic Club	Stanford Field; Stanford, California	W 29–11
November 13	vs. Santa Clara	Ewing Field; San Francisco, California	W 30–0

=== 1916 season ===
1916 Stanford rugby football
- Conference: Independent
- Record: 9–1
- Head coach: Floyd C. Brown (4th season)
- Home ground: Stanford Field

In their last full season of rugby, Stanford won all its games except the "Big Game" against Santa Clara, played for the second year at Ewing Field in San Francisco. This was Stanford's first loss since 1913.

==== Schedule ====
Date	Opponent	Site	Result
September 9	Olympic Club	Stanford Field; Stanford, California	W 9–8
September 16	Barbarians Club (San Francisco)	Stanford Field; Stanford, California	W 43–0
September 23	Olympic Club	Stanford Field; Stanford, California	W 38–16
September 30	Palo Alto Athletic Club	Stanford Field; Stanford, California	W 13–8
October 7	Olympic Club	Stanford Field; Stanford, California	W 39–16
October 14	Palo Alto Athletic Club	Stanford Field; Stanford, California	W 19–8
October 21	Presley's All-Stars	Stanford Field; Stanford, California	W 35–6
October 28	Palo Alto Athletic Club	Stanford Field; Stanford, California	W 26–9
November 4	Olympic Club	Stanford Field; Stanford, California	W 29–0
November 11	vs. Santa Clara	Ewing Field; San Francisco, California	L 5–28

=== 1917 season ===
1917 Stanford rugby football
- Conference: Independent
- Record: 1–0
- Head coach: Jim Wylie (1st season)
- Home ground: Stanford Field

Like the two coaches before him, Stanford's new head coach Jim Wylie was a former Stanford player. He had also been a member of the New Zealand All Blacks team that had crushed Stanford's team in 1913. But with World War I imminent, Stanford played just one game, the "Big Game" against Santa Clara, winning 15–11. This was also Stanford rugby's last game as a major sport. The following year, Stanford president Ray Lyman Wilbur canceled all intercollegiate athletic events due to students' enlisting in the military for the war, and due to Stanford's designation as the regional headquarters of the Students' Army Training Corps. When Stanford reformed a team in 1919, the school returned to American football as its major gridiron sport.

==== Schedule ====
Date	Opponent	Site	Result
November 24	Santa Clara	Stanford Field; Stanford, California	W 15–11
