= 1919 California Golden Bears football team =

American college football season

1919 California Golden Bears football
- Conference: Pacific Coast Conference
- Record: 6–2–1 (2–2 PCC)
- Head coach: Andy Smith (4th season)
- Offensive scheme: Short-punt
- Captain: Fred T. Brooks
- Home stadium: California Field

1919 Pacific Coast Conference football standings
	Conf.					Overall
Team	W		L		T	W		L		T
Oregon ^ +	2	–	1	–	0	5	–	2	–	0
Washington +	2	–	1	–	0	5	–	1	–	0
California	2	–	2	–	0	6	–	2	–	1
Washington State	2	–	2	–	0	5	–	2	–	0
Stanford	1	–	1	–	0	4	–	3	–	0
Oregon Agricultural	1	–	3	–	0	4	–	4	–	1
+ – Conference co-champions; ^ – Selected as Rose Bowl representative

The 1919 California Golden Bears football team was an American football team that represented the University of California, Berkeley in the Pacific Coast Conference (PCC) during the 1919 college football season. In their fourth year under head coach Andy Smith, the team compiled a 6–2–1 record (2–2 against PCC opponents), finished in a tie for third place in the PCC, and outscored its opponents by a combined total of 147 to 64.

== Schedule ==
Date	Opponent	Site	Result	Attendance	Source
September 27	Olympic Club*	California Field; Berkeley, CA	W 12–0		
October 4	Olympic Club*	California Field; Berkeley, CA	T 6–6		
October 11	Saint Mary's*	California Field; Berkeley, CA	W 19–0		
October 18	Occidental*	California Field; Berkeley, CA	W 61–0		
October 25	Washington State	California Field; Berkeley, CA	L 0–14		
November 1	Oregon Agricultural	California Field; Berkeley, CA	W 21–14		
November 8	at USC*	Bovard Field; Los Angeles, CA	W 14–13	9,000	
November 22	at Stanford	Stanford Field; Stanford, CA (Big Game)	W 14–10		
November 27	at Washington	Denny Field; Seattle, WA	L 0–7	16,000	
*Non-conference game
