= Stanford Field =

Stadium in Stanford, California

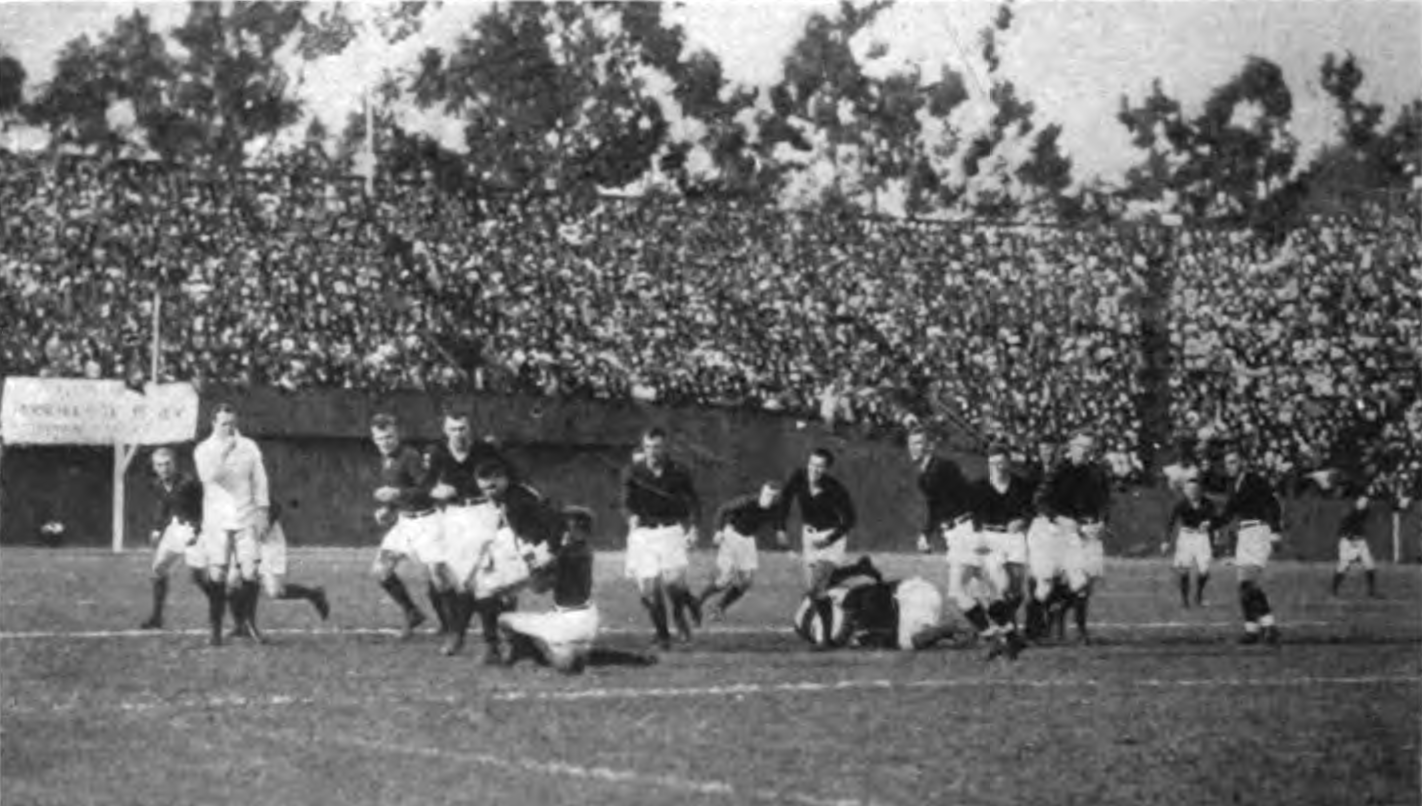
- Big Game (rugby) between Stanford and California on Stanford Field, c. 1913

- Location in the United States Location in California
- Interactive map of Stanford Field
- Address: Campus Drive
- Location: Stanford University; Stanford, California, U.S.
- Coordinates: 37°25′50″N 122°09′45″W
- Owner: Stanford University
- Capacity: 15,000

Construction
- Opened: November 11, 1905; 120 years ago
- Closed: November 12, 1921; 104 years ago

Tenant
- Stanford University Football (NCAA) (1905–1921)

Stanford Field was an outdoor college football stadium located on the campus of Stanford University in Stanford, California at the current site of the Taube Tennis Center. It was the home field for Stanford football and rugby.

Opened 121 years ago in 1905, its inaugural event was the Big Game between Stanford and California on November 11, with Stanford winning 12–5. Sixteen years later in November 1921, the team moved to the new 60,000-seat Stanford Stadium.

The approximate elevation of Stanford Field was sixty feet (18 m) above sea level.
