= List of Oregon State Beavers football seasons =

The Oregon State Beavers football team competes in the National Collegiate Athletic Association (NCAA) Division I Football Bowl Subdivision, representing the Oregon State University.

== Seasons ==
Year	Coach	Overall	Conference	Standing	Bowl/playoffs	Coaches^{#}	AP^{°}
Will Bloss (Oregon Intercollegiate Football Association) (1893)
1893–94	Will Bloss	5–1	3–0	1st			
Guy Kennedy (Oregon Intercollegiate Football Association) (1894)
1894	Guy Kennedy	2–1	1–1	2nd			
Paul Downing (Oregon Intercollegiate Football Association) (1895)
1895	Paul Downing	0–2–1	0–2–1	6th			
Tommy Code (Oregon Intercollegiate Football Association) (1896)
1896	Tommy Code	1–2	1–2	4th			
Will Bloss (Oregon Intercollegiate Football Association) (1897)
1897	Will Bloss	5–0	3–0	1st			
Independent (1898)
1898	No coach	1–2–1					
Hiland Orlando Stickney (Independent) (1899)
1899	Hiland O. Stickney	3–2					
1900	No team						
1901	No team						
Fred Herbold (Independent) (1902)
1902	Fred Herbold	4–1–1					
Thomas L. McFadden (Independent) (1903)
1903	Thomas L. McFadden	2–4–1					
Allen Steckle (Independent) (1904–1905)
1904	Allen Steckle	4–2					
1905	Allen Steckle	6–3					
Fred Norcross (Independent) (1906–1907)
1906	Fred Norcross	4–1–2					
1907	Fred Norcross	6–0					
Fred Norcross (Northwest Conference) (1908)
1908	Fred Norcross	4–3–1	1–2	T–3rd			
Sol Metzger (Independent) (1909)
1909	Sol Metzger	4–2–1					
George Schildmiller (Independent) (1910)
1910	George Schildmiller	3–2–1					
Sam Dolan (Independent) (1911)
1911	Sam Dolan	5–2					
Sam Dolan (Northwest Conference) (1912)
1912	Sam Dolan	3–4	1–3	6th			
E. J. Stewart (Northwest Conference) (1913–1914)
1913	E. J. Stewart	3–2–3	3–1–1	2nd			
1914	E. J. Stewart	7–0–2	2–0–2	2nd			
E. J. Stewart (Independent) (1915)
1915	E. J. Stewart	5–3					
Joseph Pipal (Pacific Coast Conference) (1916–1917)
1916	Joseph Pipal	4–5	0–2	3rd			
1917	Joseph Pipal	4–2–1	1–2–1	3rd			
Homer Woodson Hargiss (Pacific Coast Conference) (1918–1919)
1918	Homer W. Hargiss	2–4	0–2	5th			
1919	Homer W. Hargiss	4–4–1	1–3	6th			
Dick Rutherford (Pacific Coast Conference) (1920–1923)
1920	Dick Rutherford	2–2–2	1–2–1	5th			
1921	Dick Rutherford	4–3–2	1–2–1	4th			
1922	Dick Rutherford	3–4	1–3	T–5th			
1923	Dick Rutherford	4–5–2	1–3–1	T–6th			
Paul J. Schissler (Pacific Coast Conference) (1924–1932)
1924	Paul J. Schissler	3–5	1–4	7th			
1925	Paul J. Schissler	7–2	3–2	T–3rd			
1926	Paul J. Schissler	7–1	4–1	T–3rd			
1927	Paul J. Schissler	3–3–1	2–3	T–5th			
1928	Paul J. Schissler	6–3	2–3	T–6th			
1929	Paul J. Schissler	5–4	1–4	T–7th			
1930	Paul J. Schissler	7–3	2–3	6th			
1931	Paul J. Schissler	6–3–1	1–3–1	7th			
1932	Paul J. Schissler	4–6	1–4	T–8th			
Lon Stiner (Pacific Coast Conference) (1933–1948)
1933	Lon Stiner	6–2–2	2–1–1	4th			
1934	Lon Stiner	3–6–2	0–5–2	9th			
1935	Lon Stiner	6–4–1	2–3–1	7th			
1936	Lon Stiner	4–6	3–5	6th			
1937	Lon Stiner	3–3–3	2–3–3	6th			
1938	Lon Stiner	5–3–1	4–3–1	T–3rd			
1939	Lon Stiner	9–1–1	6–1–1	3rd	W Pineapple		
1940	Lon Stiner	5–3–1	4–3–1	3rd			
1941	Lon Stiner	8–2	7–2	1st	W Rose		12
1942	Lon Stiner	4–5–1	4–4	5th			
1943	No team						
1944	No team						
1945	Lon Stiner	4–4–1	4–4	4th			
1946	Lon Stiner	7–1–1	6–1–1	2nd			
1947	Lon Stiner	5–5	3–4	6th			
1948	Lon Stiner	5–4–3	2–3–2	6th	W Pineapple		
Kip Taylor (Pacific Coast Conference) (1949–1954)
1949	Kip Taylor	7–3	5–3	5th			
1950	Kip Taylor	3–6	2–5	8th			
1951	Kip Taylor	4–6	3–5	6th			
1952	Kip Taylor	2–7	1–6	9th			
1953	Kip Taylor	3–6	3–5	6th			
1954	Kip Taylor	1–8	1–6	T–8th			
Tommy Prothro (Pacific Coast Conference) (1955–1958)
1955	Tommy Prothro	6–3	5–2	2nd			
1956	Tommy Prothro	7–3–1	6–1–1	1st	L Rose	13	10
1957	Tommy Prothro	8–2	6–2	T–1st			
1958	Tommy Prothro	6–4	5–3	4th			
Tommy Prothro (Independent) (1959–1963)
1959	Tommy Prothro	3–7					
1960	Tommy Prothro	6–3–1					
1961	Tommy Prothro	5–5					
1962	Tommy Prothro	9–2			W Liberty	16	
1963	Tommy Prothro	5–5					
Tommy Prothro (AAWU) (1964)
1964	Tommy Prothro	8–3	3–1	T–1st	L Rose	8	8
Dee Andros (Pacific-8 Conference) (1965–1975)
1965	Dee Andros	5–5	1–3	7th			
1966	Dee Andros	7–3	3–1	T–2nd		19	
1967	Dee Andros	7–2–1	4–1–1	T–2nd		8	7
1968	Dee Andros	7–3	5–1	2nd		13	15
1969	Dee Andros	6–4	4–3	4th			
1970	Dee Andros	6–5	3–4	T–6th			
1971	Dee Andros	5–6	3–3	5th			
1972	Dee Andros	2–9	1–6	8th			
1973	Dee Andros	2–9	2–5	T–6th			
1974	Dee Andros	3–8	3–4	T–5th			
1975	Dee Andros	1–10	1–6	7th			
Craig Fertig (Pacific-8 / Pacific-10 Conference) (1976–1979)
1976	Craig Fertig	2–10	1–6	T–7th			
1977	Craig Fertig	3–8 (Note: UCLA's win over Oregon State was forfeited due to ineligible players.)	1–7	T–7th			
1978	Craig Fertig	3–7–1	2–6	9th			
1979	Craig Fertig	2–9 (Note: Arizona State's win over Oregon State was forfeited due to ineligible players.)	1–7	10th			
Joe Avezzano (Pacific-10 Conference) (1980–1984)
1980	Joe Avezzano	0–11	0–8	10th			
1981	Joe Avezzano	1–10	0–7	10th			
1982	Joe Avezzano	1–9–1	0–7–1	10th			
1983	Joe Avezzano	2–8–1	1–6–1	9th			
1984	Joe Avezzano	2–9	1–7	9th			
Dave Kragthorpe (Pacific-10 Conference) (1985–1990)
1985	Dave Kragthorpe	3–8	2–6	9th			
1986	Dave Kragthorpe	3–8	2–5	10th			
1987	Dave Kragthorpe	2–9	0–7	10th			
1988	Dave Kragthorpe	4–6–1	2–5–1	8th			
1989	Dave Kragthorpe	4–7–1	3–4–1	6th			
1990	Dave Kragthorpe	1–10	1–6	10th			
Jerry Pettibone (Pacific-10 Conference) (1991–1996)
1991	Jerry Pettibone	1–10	1–7	T–9th			
1992	Jerry Pettibone	1–9–1	0–7–1	10th			
1993	Jerry Pettibone	4–7	2–6	T–8th			
1994	Jerry Pettibone	4–7	2–6	T–8th			
1995	Jerry Pettibone	1–10	0–8	10th			
1996	Jerry Pettibone	2–9	1–7	10th			
Mike Riley (Pacific-10 Conference) (1997–1998)
1997	Mike Riley	3–8	0–8	10th			
1998	Mike Riley	5–6	2–6	T–8th			
Dennis Erickson (Pacific-10 Conference) (1999–2002)
1999	Dennis Erickson	7–5	4–4	5th	L Oahu		
2000	Dennis Erickson	11–1	7–1	T–1st	W Fiesta^{†}	5	4
2001	Dennis Erickson	5–6	3–5	7th			
2002	Dennis Erickson	8–5	4–4	T–4th	L Insight		
Mike Riley (Pacific-10 / Pac-12 Conference) (2003–2014)
2003	Mike Riley	8–5	4–4	T–4th	W Las Vegas		
2004	Mike Riley	7–5	5–3	T–3rd	W Insight		
2005	Mike Riley	5–6	3–5	7th			
2006	Mike Riley	10–4	6–3	3rd	W Sun	22	21
2007	Mike Riley	9–4	6–3	3rd	W Emerald		25
2008	Mike Riley	9–4	7–2	T–2nd	W Sun	19	18
2009	Mike Riley	8–5	6–3	T–2nd	L Las Vegas		
2010	Mike Riley	5–7	4–5	T–5th			
2011	Mike Riley	3–9	3–6	5th (North)			
2012	Mike Riley	9–4	6–3	3rd (North)	L Alamo	19	20
2013	Mike Riley	7–6	4–5	T–4th (North)	W Hawaii		
2014	Mike Riley	5–7	2–7	T–5th (North)			
Gary Andersen (Pac-12 Conference) (2015–2017)
2015	Gary Andersen	2–10	0–9	6th (North)			
2016	Gary Andersen	4–8	3–6	T–4th (North)			
2017	Gary Andersen (Note: Andersen was the head coach for the first six games of the season. On October 9, 2017, Cory Hall was named interim head coach after the university and Andersen mutually agreed to part ways.)	1–11	0–9	6th (North)			
Jonathan Smith (Pac-12 Conference) (2018–present)
2018	Jonathan Smith	2–10	1–8	6th (North)			
2019	Jonathan Smith	5–7	4–5	T–2nd (North)			
2020	Jonathan Smith	2–5	2–5	4th (North)			
2021	Jonathan Smith	7–6	5–4	3rd (North)	L LA		
2022	Jonathan Smith	10–3	6–3	5th	W Las Vegas	17	17
2023	Jonathan Smith	8–5	5–4	T–4th	L Sun		
Trent Bray (Pac-12 Conference) (2024–2025)
2024	Trent Bray	5–7	1–0				
2025	Trent Bray (0-7), Rob Akey (2-3)	2–10	1–1				
Total:		574–635–50					
National championship Conference title Conference division title or championship game berth
^{†}Indicates Bowl Coalition, Bowl Alliance, BCS, or CFP / New Years' Six bowl.; ^{#}Rankings from final Coaches Poll.
