= List of Oregon Ducks starting quarterbacks =

These quarterbacks have started for the Oregon Ducks. They are listed in order of the date of each player's first start at quarterback.

== Starting quarterbacks ==
These are the quarterbacks who had the most starts for the season. Note: game statistics include bowl game results.

Year	Name	GP	GS	Att	Comp	Yard	TD	Int	Pct	Lng	Rating	Class
2025	Dante Moore	15	15	412	296	3,565'	30	10	71.8	65	163.7	RS Sophomore
2024	Dillon Gabriel	14	14	447	326	3,857	30	6	72.9	69	164.9	RS Senior
2023	Bo Nix	14	14	364	470	4,508	45	3	**77.45**	84	188.3	RS Senior
2022	Bo Nix	13	13	294	409	3,594	29	7	71.9	67	149.4	RS Junior
2021	Anthony Brown	14	14	250	390	2,989	18	7	64.1	66	140.1	Senior
2020	Tyler Shough	7	7	106	167	1,559	13	6	.635	71	160.4	Sophomore
2019	Justin Herbert	14	14	428	286	3,471	32	5	.668	73	158.7	Senior
2018	Justin Herbert	13	13	404	240	3,151	29	8	.594	83	148.8	Junior
2017	Justin Herbert	8	8	206	139	1,983	15	5	.675	67	167.5	Sophomore
2016	Justin Herbert	9	9	255	162	1,936	19	4	.635	72	148.8	Freshman
2015	Vernon Adams	10	10	259	168	2,643	26	6	.649	52	179.1	Graduate Transfer Senior
2014	Marcus Mariota	15	15	445	304	4,454	42	4	.683	80	181.7	RS Junior
2013	Marcus Mariota	13	13	386	245	3,665	31	4	.635	75	167.7	RS Sophomore
2012	Marcus Mariota	13	13	336	230	2,677	32	6	.685	55	163.2	RS Freshman
2011	Darron Thomas	14	13	339	211	2,761	33	7	.622	69	158.7	Junior
2010	Darron Thomas	13	13	361	222	2,881	30	9	.615	84	151.0	Sophomore
2009	Jeremiah Masoli	13	13	305	177	2,147	15	6	.580	73	129.5	Junior
2008	Jeremiah Masoli	12	10	239	136	1,744	13	5	.569	76	132.0	Sophomore
2007	Dennis Dixon	10	10	254	172	2,136	20	4	.677	85	161.2	Senior
2006	Dennis Dixon	12	12	322	197	2,143	12	14	.612	67	120.7	Junior
2005	Kellen Clemens	8	8	289	185	2,406	19	4	.640	61	152.9	Senior
2004	Kellen Clemens	11	11	372	223	2,548	22	10	.599	59	131.6	Junior
2003	Kellen Clemens	13	13	182	304	2,400	18	9	.599	-	-	Sophomore
2002	Jason Fife	13	13	190	367	2,752	24	10	.518	-	-	Junior
2001	Joey Harrington	12	12	364	214	2,764	27	6	.588	-	143.8	Senior
2000	Joey Harrington	12	12	214	405	2,967	22	14	.528	-	125.4	Junior
1999	A. J. Feeley	10	10	136	259	1,951	14	6	.525	-	-	Junior
1998	Akili Smith	12	12	215	371	3,763	32	8	.580	-	-	Senior
1997	Akili Smith	11	11	108	200	1,385	13	7	.540	-	-	Junior
1996	Tony Graziani/Ryan Perry-Smith	-	-	-	-	-	-	-	-	-	-	-
1995	Tony Graziani	-	-	-	-	-	-	-	-	-	-	-
1994	Danny O'Neil	-	-	-	-	-	-	-	-	-	-	-
1993	Danny O'Neil	-	-	-	-	-	-	-	-	-	-	-
1992	Danny O'Neil	-	-	-	-	-	-	-	-	-	-	-
1991	Brett Salisbury/Danny O'Neil	-	-	-	-	-	-	-	-	-	-	-
1990	Bill Musgrave	-	-	-	-	-	-	-	-	-	-	-
1989	Bill Musgrave	-	-	-	-	-	-	-	-	-	-	-
1988	Bill Musgrave/Pete Nelson	-	-	-	-	-	-	-	-	-	-	-
1987	Bill Musgrave	-	-	-	-	-	-	-	-	-	-	-
1986	Chris Miller	-	-	-	-	-	-	-	-	-	-	-
1985	Chris Miller	-	-	-	-	-	-	-	-	-	-	-
1984	Chris Miller	-	-	-	-	-	-	-	-	-	-	-
1983	Mike Jorgensen	-	-	-	-	-	-	-	-	-	-	-
1982	Kevin Lusk/Mike Jorgensen	-	-	-	-	-	-	-	-	-	-	-
1981	Kevin Lusk	-	-	-	-	-	-	-	-	-	-	-
1980	Reggie Ogburn	-	-	-	-	-	-	-	-	-	-	-
1979	Reggie Ogburn	-	-	-	-	-	-	-	-	-	-	-
1978	Mike Kennedy/Tim Durando	-	-	-	-	-	-	-	-	-	-	-
1977	Jack Henderson	-	-	-	-	-	-	-	-	-	-	-
1976	Jack Henderson	-	-	-	-	-	-	-	-	-	-	-
1975	Jack Henderson	-	-	-	-	-	-	-	-	-	-	-
1974	Norv Turner	-	-	-	-	-	-	-	-	-	-	-
1973	Herb Singleton	11	7	234	109	1333	10	19	46.6	-	92.3	Junior
1972	Dan Fouts	-	-	-	-	-	-	-	-	-	-	-
1971	Dan Fouts	-	-	-	-	-	-	-	-	-	-	-
1970	Dan Fouts	-	-	-	-	-	-	-	-	-	-	-
1969	Tom Blanchard	-	-	-	-	-	-	-	-	-	-	-
1968	Eric Olson	-	-	-	-	-	-	-	-	-	-	-
1967	Eric Olson	-	-	-	-	-	-	-	-	-	-	-
1966	Mike Barnes	-	-	-	-	-	-	-	-	-	-	-
1965	Mike Brundage	-	-	-	-	-	-	-	-	-	-	-
1964	Bob Berry	-	-	-	-	-	-	-	-	-	-	-
1963	Bob Berry	-	-	-	-	-	-	-	-	-	-	-
1962	Bob Berry	-	-	-	-	-	-	-	-	-	-	-
1961	Doug Post	-	-	-	-	-	-	-	-	-	-	-
1960	Dave Grosz	-	-	-	-	-	-	-	-	-	-	-
1959	Dave Grosz	-	-	-	-	-	-	-	-	-	-	-
1958	Dave Grosz	-	-	-	-	-	-	-	-	-	-	-
1957	Jack Crabtree	-	-	-	-	-	-	-	-	-	-	-
1956	Tom Crabtree	-	-	-	-	-	-	-	-	-	-	-
1955	Tom Crabtree	-	-	-	-	-	-	-	-	-	-	-
1954	George Shaw	-	-	-	-	-	-	-	-	-	-	-
1953	George Shaw	-	-	-	-	-	-	-	-	-	-	-
1952	George Shaw	-	-	-	-	-	-	-	-	-	-	-
1951	Hal Dunham	-	-	-	-	-	-	-	-	-	-	-
1950	Earl Steele	-	-	-	-	-	-	-	-	-	-	-
1949	Earl Steele	-	-	-	-	-	-	-	-	-	-	-
1948	Norm Van Brocklin	-	-	-	-	-	-	-	-	-	-	-
1947	Norm Van Brocklin	-	-	-	-	-	-	-	-	-	-	-
1946	--	-	-	-	-	-	-	-	-	-	-	-
1945	--	-	-	-	-	-	-	-	-	-	-	-
1944	--	-	-	-	-	-	-	-	-	-	-	-
1943	--	-	-	-	-	-	-	-	-	-	-	-
1942	--	-	-	-	-	-	-	-	-	-	-	-
1941	--	-	-	-	-	-	-	-	-	-	-	-
1940	--	-	-	-	-	-	-	-	-	-	-	-
1939	--	-	-	-	-	-	-	-	-	-	-	-
1938	--	-	-	-	-	-	-	-	-	-	-	-
1937	--	-	-	-	-	-	-	-	-	-	-	-
1936	--	-	-	-	-	-	-	-	-	-	-	-
1935	--	-	-	-	-	-	-	-	-	-	-	-
1934	--	-	-	-	-	-	-	-	-	-	-	-
1933	--	-	-	-	-	-	-	-	-	-	-	-
1932	--	-	-	-	-	-	-	-	-	-	-	-
1931	--	-	-	-	-	-	-	-	-	-	-	-
1930	--	-	-	-	-	-	-	-	-	-	-	-
1929	--	-	-	-	-	-	-	-	-	-	-	-
1928	--	-	-	-	-	-	-	-	-	-	-	-
1927	--	-	-	-	-	-	-	-	-	-	-	-
1926	--	-	-	-	-	-	-	-	-	-	-	-
1925	--	-	-	-	-	-	-	-	-	-	-	-
1924	--	-	-	-	-	-	-	-	-	-	-	-
1923	--	-	-	-	-	-	-	-	-	-	-	-
1922	--	-	-	-	-	-	-	-	-	-	-	-
1921	--	-	-	-	-	-	-	-	-	-	-	-
1920	--	-	-	-	-	-	-	-	-	-	-	-
1919	Bill Steers	-	-	-	-	-	-	-	-	-	-	-
1918	--	-	-	-	-	-	-	-	-	-	-	-
1917	--	-	-	-	-	-	-	-	-	-	-	-
1916	Shy Huntington	-	-	-	-	-	-	-	-	-	-	Senior
1915	Shy Huntington	-	-	-	-	-	-	-	-	-	-	Junior
1914	--	-	-	-	-	-	-	-	-	-	-	-
1913	--	-	-	-	-	-	-	-	-	-	-	-
1912	--	-	-	-	-	-	-	-	-	-	-	-
1911	--	-	-	-	-	-	-	-	-	-	-	-
1910	--	-	-	-	-	-	-	-	-	-	-	-
1909	--	-	-	-	-	-	-	-	-	-	-	-
1908	--	-	-	-	-	-	-	-	-	-	-	-
1907	--	-	-	-	-	-	-	-	-	-	-	-
1906	--	-	-	-	-	-	-	-	-	-	-	-
1905	--	-	-	-	-	-	-	-	-	-	-	-
1904	--	-	-	-	-	-	-	-	-	-	-	-
1903	--	-	-	-	-	-	-	-	-	-	-	-
1902	--	-	-	-	-	-	-	-	-	-	-	-
1901	--	-	-	-	-	-	-	-	-	-	-	-
1900	--	-	-	-	-	-	-	-	-	-	-	-
1899	--	-	-	-	-	-	-	-	-	-	-	-
1898	--	-	-	-	-	-	-	-	-	-	-	-
1897	--	-	-	-	-	-	-	-	-	-	-	-
1896	--	-	-	-	-	-	-	-	-	-	-	-
1895	--	-	-	-	-	-	-	-	-	-	-	-
1894	--	-	-	-	-	-	-	-	-	-	-	-

*Bold indicates NCAA record
