= 1895 Oregon Agricultural Aggies football team =

American college football season

1895 Oregon Agricultural Aggies football
- Conference: Oregon Intercollegiate Football Association
- Record: 0–2–1 ( OIFA)
- Head coach: Paul Downing (1st season)
- Captain: Harvey McAlister
- Home stadium: OAC Field

The 1895 Oregon Agricultural Aggies football team represented Oregon Agricultural College (OAC)—now known as Oregon State University—during the 1895 college football season. The team was a member of the Oregon Intercollegiate Football Association. In their first and only year under head coach Paul Downing, the Aggies compiled a record of 0–2–1 and were outscored by opponents 82 to 6. The Aggies played Pacific University to a scoreless tie, but lost to Willamette (36–6) and Oregon (46–0). A. J. Simpson was the team captain.

== Schedule ==
Date	Opponent	Site	Result	Attendance	Source
October 26	at Oregon	Kincaid Field; Eugene, OR (rivalry)	L 0–46		
November 9	Pacific (OR)	OAC Field; Corvallis, OR	T 0–0		
November 16	at Willamette	Oregon State Fairgrounds; Salem, OR	L 6–36	1,000	

== Team organization ==
The coming of fall and the opening of a new academic year brought with it talk of football, the collegiate sport which had already found a dedicated following in the small community of Corvallis, Oregon. Rumors swirled that the 1894 Oregon champion Portland University squad was attempting to induce Oregon Agricultural College star Miles Phillips to enroll in their school. Although the return of Phillips remained undetermined, local fans looked forward to the return of "Mac McAllister, Bodine, the Simpsons, Terrell, and other strong players," and prospects for organization of "a crack team" for 1895 were regarded as excellent.

It was reported that a large "entertainment" was to be held in Corvallis on October 15 to raise funds for support of the OAC football team to help cover its expenses for the year.

Lieutenant C.E. Dentler was elected manager of the Oregon Agricultural Football team for 1895. Dentler, representative of the school to the State Football Association in Salem, was regarded as a heady administrator and was said to be "hostile to slugging and brutality in the football game." The local press promised that "anything bordering on the latter will be eliminated from the OAC team's tactics under his management." The violence of the game had been in the public mind since Harvard President Charles William Eliot made news denouncing the barbarity of the sport back in February, blaming the mayhem on "graduates, fathers, mothers and sisters, leaders of society, and the various gamblers and rowdies" who whipped up at atmosphere of violent frenzy.

Dentler attended a meeting in Salem on Saturday, October 5 to organize a schedule for 1895 for the Oregon Intercollegiate Football Association. Joining Dentler were representatives of the University of Oregon, Willamette University, Pacific University, and Portland University. President E. E. Washburne of Portland University was selected as president of the conference by virtue of his school having won the championship in 1894. The conference representatives agreed to accept the Harvard–Pennsylvania–Cornell rules for the 1895–96 season and adopted the Spalding football as the official ball of the league.

=== Coach selection ===
An 1893 ad for the Spalding Model No. J Intercollegiate Football, declared official for 1895 by the Oregon Intercollegiate Football Association.

With the framework for intercollegiate play arranged, Manager Dentler located a potential coach for the team, formerly associated with the University of California squad at Berkeley. Subscriptions were collected on campus to cover the expense of bringing the coach to town, with a local newspaper declaring:

"In a day or two the papers will appear among the businessmen and citizens and will doubtless meet with hearty and substantial responses. The team is out for the championship and there are undoubtedly plenty of people in town anxious enough to see them win that the question of a few dollars to pay for a competent coacher will not be allowed to stand in the way of success."

It would be the University of Oregon in Eugene that landed an ex-Berkeley star as its coach for 1895, when former quarterback Percy Benson committed for the position. With an October 25 matchup looming against the Webfoots, as of the first of October OAC's football volunteers were taking to the field for practice without a head coach. The Corvallis Gazette reported that negotiations to hire an experienced coach were "pending" and that "unless there is some hitch in the proceedings he will be here in the course of a week or ten days. "There seems to be a lack of enthusiasm so essential in maintaining interest in the work," the paper warned.

OAC would finally land four-year Stanford University football star and 1894 team captain Paul Downing to coach the Aggies squad for the 1895 season. A short-term, temporary hire, it would be the 22-year old Downing's single year at the helm of the orange-and-black.

Downing arrived in Corvallis from California on Sunday, October 19 – a scant one week before the scheduled battle against the rival Oregon Webfoots in Eugene.

=== Exhibition game ===
Prior to the hiring of a coach, an exhibition game was played on the OAC grounds on Saturday, October 12, 1895, a split-squad game pitting veterans versus new members of the team. The match was won by the veterans by a score of 16 to 4.

== Game summaries ==
=== October 16: Oregon ===
Negotiations between team managers took place in Corvallis in early October for the scheduled October 26 game pitting the OAC Aggies and the U of O Webfoots. The Oregon squad agreed to pay OAC's travel expenses and a quarter of the gate to the visitors. A ticket price of 50 cents was established for the game, with Webfoot team manager C.W. Keene compelled to write to the Eugene Guard in explanation of the doubling of ticket price from the previous year:

"A football game represents an immense expenditure not only of labor but of cash, and this year our expenses have far exceeded those of any preceding year. We are very anxious to win the pennant and have determined to spare nothing which can help us. We have brought a coach from California; our suits have cost us a great deal, and a considerable sum has been expended on the grounds and seats.... Now there is one thing very certain, namely, we can never come out even on our expenses on a basis of 25 cents admission. So we will have to ask our supporters and friends to stand this extra charge and to help us in our struggle which means a great deal to our Alma Mater and thence indirectly to Eugene."

The Oregon–OAC game was scheduled independently of the Oregon Intercollegiate Football Association's short tournament format, with the Corvallis press emphasizing its unofficial nature and attempting to instill low expectations among its readers:

"Next Saturday OAC goes to Eugene for a friendly practice game. They may be expected to return as defeated as the Eugene team has been practicing under the late captain of the Berkeley team as coacher for a couple of weeks and is prepared to put up a better game than the [Aggies]."

The game against the University of Oregon squad was anxiously anticipated. Well before gametime of 3:00 pm the grounds began filling with fans. A high wall had been erected to enclose the north side of the playing area, while on the south end a mounted policeman kept watch for those attempting to sneak in without a 50 cent ticket.

The game was not close. Early in the first half LHB Bishop of the U of O broke free on a long run, scoring a 4-point touchdown. The Webfoots connected on the kick after touchdown for two more points, making the score 6–0. OAC was stopped and on the next possession E.P. Shattuck scored for Oregon again, making the score 10–0 after a missed conversion attempt. Two more first half touchdowns and conversions followed and the home team took a commanding 22–0 score to the halftime intermission.

The second half proved to be an even bigger debacle for the overmatched and shut-out Aggies, with the Oregon squad stacking on another 24 points for a final score of 46–0.

The following eleven players started for OAC:

• Left end: E.W. Stimpson
• Left tackle: A.J. Tharp
• Left guard: D.H. Bodine
• Center: Porter
• Right guard: H.L. McAllister
• Right tackle: Phillips
• Right end: Phillips

• Quarterback: Simpson (captain)
• Left Halfback: Scroggins
• Right Halfback: Charles Small
• Fullback: Harry W. Kelly

Substitutes: McQuinn, Charles Owsley, Ralph Terrell

By previous agreement the University of Oregon as winner moved on to play a practice game against Willamette University at the Oregon State Fairgrounds the following week, with the OAC squad left to lick their wounds in Corvallis, an open week allowing time for some much-needed practice.

The daily newspaper in Eugene did not miss the opportunity to have a laugh, declaring that the 46-point shellacking "seems to have paralyzed the Farmers of the hayseed city, usually called Corvallis."

=== November 9: Pacific University ===
The second game was played against Pacific University, a 0–0 tie. A coin was tossed to determine who would play Willamette at the Oregon State Fairgrounds the following weekend with Oregon Agricultural winning the toss.

=== November 16: Willamette University ===
The third game was played against Willamette University, hosted by the Salem school on a gridiron field at the Oregon State Fairgrounds. There were 1,000 or more fans on hand to watch the opening kickoff at 3:40 pm. According to a report in a Salem newspaper, OAC "had Bidwell, [Oregon Normal School's] best man, two coaches, and half a dozen ringers and coppers" stuffed onto their roster in an effort at competitive advantage. The game was effectively a state semifinal with the winner scheduled to subsequently play the winner of the game between the University of Oregon and University of Portland for the Oregon Intercollegiate Football Association Championship. The University of Oregon defeated the University of Portland 6-4.

The opening kick was received by Bidwell of the Aggies, who briefly lost control of the ball before being buried under a sea of humanity. The first OAC drive was rapidly halted and Willamette took over, with Walter Paige and Mark Savage successfully gaining ground around end. Savage ultimately scored the first touchdown of the game for the Willamettes at about the 10 minute mark, a 4-point score that was met by wild applause by the fans and the blowing of a multitude of tin horns in celebration. The conversion kick was good and Willamette led by a score of 6 to 0.

Back in possession of the ball and resuming play from midfield, OAC center Terrell raised the ball and plowed forward into the Willamette defense. The ball was soon turned over, however, and Walter Paige again made a long run for the home team, scampering many yards along the sideline. This time it would be Right Halfback Mark Savage finishing for the Willamette team, with Murphy adding a successful conversion to make the score 12 to 0.

Corvallis' team then went on a long drive, taking the ball all the way down to the Willamette 5-yard line, but they failed to score. With time in the half running down, Willamette right end Guiss broke free on what was described as a "zig-zag play," with his long run setting up a third touchdown of the half for the Salem squad. The 2-point conversion kick was again good and the Willamettes took an 18–0 score into the halftime intermission.

Early in the second half, Willamette quarterback Murphy broke a long run around end, scoring yet another touchdown. The conversion was missed, leaving the score 22 to zero. On the ensuing possession the Aggies scored their one and only touchdown of the 1895 season when Right Halfback Oberer managed to break a tackle and streak around Willamette's left end. With the successful conversion the score became 22—6.

The Aggies were unable to keep pace, however, giving up another 14 points before the game was called at 5:20 pm on account of a rolling fog that made it impossible to see across the width of the field. The final score: Willamette 36, OAC 6. Both teams exchanged cheers following the conclusion of play and the fans began to rush for the streetcars. The University of Oregon subsequently defeated Willamette 6-0 to win the Oregon Intercollegiate Football Association Championship.
