= Bill Libby =

William Melvin "Bill" Libby
- Born: November 14, 1927; Atlantic City, New Jersey
- Died: June 16, 1984 (aged 56); Westminster, California
- Education: Indiana University
- Spouse: Sharon
- Children: Allyson, Laurie Libby
- Writing career
- Language: English
- Notable work: Champions of College Football
- Notable awards: National Magazine Sportswriter of the Year (1964); Bill Libby Memorial Award (eponymous) (1968); Southern California Jewish Sports Hall of Fame (2004)

William Melvin "Bill" Libby (November 14, 1927 – June 17, 1984) was an American writer and biographer best known for books on sports including 65 on sports figures.

== Early years ==
Libby graduated from Shortridge High School in Indianapolis, also attended by several notable authors including Kurt Vonnegut. He served in the United States Navy from September 1945 to October 1948. He attended Indiana University from 1948 to 1951. Libby was sports editor of the Herald Statesman then later worked for the New York Post.

== Works ==
Libby wrote several books on sports figures including Rod Carew, Wilt Chamberlain, Phil Esposito, A. J. Foyt, Catfish Hunter, Fred Lynn, Rocky Marciano, Pete Rose, O. J. Simpson, Willie Stargell, and Fran Tarkenton as well as books on hockey, auto racing, professional football, and college football.

He also co-wrote several books on celebrities and sports people including Nancy Reagan, the Roosevelt family, Rick Barry, Vida Blue, Monty Hall, Richard Petty, John Roseboro, Nolan Ryan, and Jerry West.

== Libby national champions ==
Libby's 1975 book Champions of College Football selected a single college football national champion from the 1900 to 1974 college football seasons. As the highest level of college football does not have an official national champion, Libby's selections are often referenced by the athletic department of the selected university.

Six of Libby's champions, for the years (1910, 1911, 1913, 1929, 1931, 1936), were not selected for that year as national champion by any NCAA-designated "major selector".

Season	Champion	Record	Coach
1900	Yale	12–0	Malcolm McBride
1901	Michigan	11–0	Fielding H. Yost
1902	Michigan	11–0	Fielding H. Yost
1903	Princeton	11–0	Art Hillebrand
1904	Minnesota	13–0	Henry Williams
1905	Chicago	10–0	Amos Alonzo Stagg
1906	Princeton	9–0–1	William Roper
1907	Yale	9–0–1	William F. Knox
1908	Penn	11–0–1	Sol Metzger
1909	Yale	10–0	Howard Jones
1910 †	Washington	6–0	Gil Dobie
1911 †	Carlisle	11–1	Glenn "Pop" Warner
1912	Harvard	9–0	Percy Haughton
1913 †	Notre Dame	7–0	Jesse Harper
1914	Illinois	7–0	Robert Zuppke
1915	Pittsburgh	8–0	Glenn "Pop" Warner
1916	Army	9–0	Charles Daly
1917	Georgia Tech	9–0	John Heisman
1918	Pittsburgh	4–1	Glenn "Pop" Warner
1919	Notre Dame	9–0	Knute Rockne
1920	California	9–0	Andy Smith
1921	Iowa	7–0	Howard Jones
1922	Cornell	8–0	Gil Dobie
1923	Illinois	8–0	Robert Zuppke
1924	Notre Dame	10–0	Knute Rockne
1925	Alabama	10–0	Wallace Wade
1926	Navy	9–0–1	Bill Ingram
1927	Texas A&M	8–0–1	Dana X. Bible
1928	Georgia Tech	10–0	William Alexander
1929 †	Tulane	9–0	Bernie Bierman
1930	Notre Dame	10–0	Knute Rockne
1931 †	Tennessee	9–0–1	Robert Neyland
1932	USC	10–0	Howard Jones
1933	Princeton	9–0	Fritz Crisler
1934	Alabama	10–0	Frank Thomas
1935	Minnesota	8–0	Bernie Bierman
1936 †	Northwestern	7–1	Pappy Waldorf
1937	Pittsburgh	9–0–1	Jock Sutherland
1938	Tennessee	11–0	Robert Neyland
1939	Texas A&M	11–0	Homer Norton
1940	Stanford	10–0	Clark Shaughnessy
1941	Minnesota	8–0	Bernie Bierman
1942	Georgia	11–1	Wally Butts
1943	Notre Dame	9–1	Frank Leahy
1944	Army	9–0	Earl Blaik
1945	Army	9–0	Earl Blaik
1946	Notre Dame	8–0–1	Frank Leahy
1947	Michigan	10–0	Fritz Crisler
1948	Michigan	9–0	Bennie Oosterbaan
1949	Notre Dame	10–0	Frank Leahy
1950	Kentucky	11–1	Paul "Bear" Bryant
1951	Maryland	10–0	Jim Tatum
1952	Michigan State	9–0	Biggie Munn
1953	Notre Dame	9–0–1	Frank Leahy
1954	UCLA	9–0	Henry Sanders
1955	Oklahoma	11–0	Bud Wilkinson
1956	Oklahoma	10–0	Bud Wilkinson
1957	Auburn	10–0	Ralph Jordan
1958	LSU	11–0	Paul Dietzel
1959	Syracuse	11–0	Ben Schwartzwalder
1960	Ole Miss	10–0–1	Johnny Vaught
1961	Alabama	11–0	Paul "Bear" Bryant
1962	USC	11–0	John McKay
1963	Texas	11–0	Darrell Royal
1964	Arkansas	11–0	Frank Broyles
1965	Michigan State	10–1	Duffy Daugherty
1966	Notre Dame	9–0–1	Ara Parseghian
1967	USC	10–1	John McKay
1968	Ohio State	10–0	Woody Hayes
1969	Texas	11–0	Darrell Royal
1970	Nebraska	11–0–1	Bob Devaney
1971	Nebraska	13–0	Bob Devaney
1972	USC	12–0	John McKay
1973	Notre Dame	11–0	Ara Parseghian
1974	Oklahoma	11–0	Barry Switzer

† Champion not selected by any NCAA-designated "major selector".

== Awards ==
In 1964, Libby was named National Magazine Sportswriter of the Year. He was named to the Southern California Jewish Sports Hall of Fame in 2004.

== Family ==
Libby and wife Sharon had two daughters, Allyson and Laurie Libby.

== See also ==
- Bill Libby Memorial Award
- College football national championships in NCAA Division I FBS
