= 1894 Oregon Agricultural Aggies football team =

American college football season

1894 Oregon Agricultural Aggies football
- Conference: Oregon Intercollegiate Football Association
- Record: 2–1 ( OIFA)
- Head coach: Guy Kennedy (1st season)
- Captain: Ralph Terrell
- Home stadium: OAC Field

The 1894 Oregon Agricultural Aggies football team represented Oregon Agricultural College (OAC)—now known as Oregon State University—during the 1894 college football season. In their first and only year under head coach Guy Kennedy, the Aggies compiled a 2–1 record and outscored their opponents by a combined total of 52 to 28. They defeated Oregon (16–0) and Oregon State Normal (36–6), but lost playing for the state championship to Portland University, 22–0.

== Schedule ==
Date	Opponent	Site	Result	Attendance	Source
November 3	Oregon	Corvallis, OR (rivalry)	W 18–0	500	
November 17	at Oregon State Normal	Monmouth, OR	W 36–6	200	
November 29	Portland University	Corvallis, OR	L 0–22		

== Game summaries ==
=== November 3: University of Oregon ===
An 1893 ad for the Spalding Model No. J Intercollegiate Football, official ball of the Oregon Intercollegiate Football Association.

The 1894 OAC season opened at home against their rivals from the State University 50 miles to the south. Kicking off at 1:30 pm, it initially appeared that the "farmers" were no match for the "dudes," with Oregon gashing the Aggies with runs around the ends. OAC managed to hold, stopping the university offensive with a turnover fairly deep inside their own end. Agric star lefthalf Brady Burnett popped a 30-yard run to change field position as OAC methodically moved the ball down the field, with Burnett capping the drive with a touchdown run inside the first 15 minutes of play.

OAC end Percy Nash, who had already suffered a shoulder injury earlier in the game, made the play of the day on defense, stopping Eugene end Edmonson in the open field, with nothing but green grass and a goal line in front of him. The score of 6–0 held at halftime.

In the second half, after several exchanges of the ball, OAC recovered a UO fumble at the Oregon 30-yard line. Aggie right halfback Godwin broke a run to paydirt, Henry Desborough converted the conversion kick, and the Agrics led 12–0. A third touchdown made it 16–0 for the final, with the "Hayseeds" holding the ball deep in the Oregon end as time expired.

The game was said to be capably officiated, full of "brilliant plays throughout," and fairly played with "little or no slugging...indulged in by either side."

=== November 17: at Oregon State Normal School ===
The OAC Aggies pushed their record to two wins in two games with a decisive 32–6 win in Monmouth over Oregon State Normal School.

While the previous year's visit of the Agrics to play the Normals was the locus of public controversy and bitterness about the alleged violent play of the visitors, there were no such complaints about OAC's decorum in November 1894. "The Corvallis team was the heavier, besides having a better knowledge of the game," the Independence West Side acknowledged, adding "the 'scrimmages' were entirely free from all unnecessary roughness and the best of feeling prevailed during the game." The observer added admiringly that "the 'farmers' are at home on the gridiron field.

The game turned fast, with OAC receiving the ball and marching down the field, capped by a touchdown run by fullback Ralph Terrell after just one minute of action. Senior Henry Desborough kicked the 2-point goal after Terrell's 4-point touchdown, and OAC led 6–0. The Normals tied the score a few minutes later with a touchdown and points after goal of their own, but the rest of the day belonged to Corvallis, as the Orangemen racked up 26 unanswered points to win going away.

The lack of dirty play did not mean there was an absence of physical injuries, however, as Corvallis fullback Terrell was lost for the afternoon and a substitute inserted in his place. Crowds following the game in Corvallis at the telephone office and clustered around bulletin boards were dismayed over initial reports that Terrell had been carried from the field bleeding from the mouth, nose, and ears, but were soon relieved to learn that injuries to the OAC star were actually minor and that he was expected back in action for the team's forthcoming Thanksgiving Day game for the state championship against Portland University.

Following the game a "pleasant reception" was held for the visitors from 25 miles to the south at the OSNS chapel, an event which was "heartily enjoyed by all."

=== November 29: Portland University ===
The Portland Oregonian was effusive:

"The tables have turned; for the first time in its history an opposing team scored today on the Oregon Agricultural College's gridiron, and, in scoring, wiped the earth with the local team. At no time have the 'Farmers' been overconfident of winning from Portland, but they had no idea of being shut out."

The game was not close.

Before the contest began, college presidents John Bloss of OAC and D.L. Edwards of Portland University delivered lectures to the participants, informing them that slugging and profanity were strictly prohibited and that any participant violating these rules would be promptly expelled from school. "No slugging was indulged in and no accidents occurred," one reporter astutely noted.

It took less than ten minutes for Portland to score its first 4-point touchdown and 2-point goal after touchdown — 6 points that would prove to be sufficient on this day. Two exchanges of possession ensued before "Corvallis successfully worked the turtleback" — in the lingo of the day — and star halfback Brady Burnett broke around left end for a big gain. Power football ensued, during which OAC turned over the ball on downs and Portland methodically drove the length of the field for another touchdown and a 12–0 halftime lead.

In the second half, the Agrics managed to drive the ball to the one-yard line, but Portland held. After an exchange of possessions, Portland left halfback Washburn broke the play of the day, a long gallop to the OAC 15-yard line, with Milton Stemler making a saving tackle for the Orange. Portland again played power football with success, scoring a third touchdown but missing the goal after, for a 16–0 score. Demoralization set in and another touchdown was rung up on the Methodists' account when Portland fullback Pearson broke through the proverbial A-gap for a fourth touchdown and a 22–0 final score.

A dinner at the girls' dormitory followed the game, in which "the collation had been prepared by the ladies and ample justice was done to the excellent spread." An evening reception in the OAC assembly hall concluded the evening.

With the win, Portland was recognized as the Oregon collegiate football champion for 1894.

== Roster ==
Team photo of the 1894 Oregon Agricultural College football team. As teams of this era typically had no more than 15 or 20 members this group probably includes both varsity and second teams.

The following players started in the contest against the University of Oregon:

- LE: C.L. Owsley
- LT: Henry Desborough
- LG: Daniel H. Bodine
- C: Harvey L. "Pap Hayseed" McAllister
- RG: Clyde Phillips
- RT: Miles J. Phillips
- RE: Percival Nash
- QB: Milton Stemler
- LHB: Brady Burnett
- RHB: Godwin
- FB: Ralph Terrell

Starters in the final game against Portland University would include Kelsay and E.W. Stimpson, with additional substitutes Fred Caples, George E. Nichols, Charles Porter, Abernathy, and Crawford.
