= 1895 Willamette football team =

American college football season

1895 Willamette football
- Conference: Oregon Intercollegiate Football Association
- Record: 2–2 ( OIFA)
- Head coach: Clinton R. Morse (1st season)
- Captain: Murphy
- Home stadium: Oregon State Fairgrounds

The 1895 Willamette football team represented Willamette University as a member of the Oregon Intercollegiate Football Association (OIFA) during the 1895 college football season. The 1895 season was the school's second year of organized football. Led by head coach Clinton R. Morse, the team compiled an overall record of 2–2.

== Schedule ==
Date	Time	Opponent	Site	Result	Attendance
October 26		at Oregon Normal	Monmouth, OR	W 36–6	
November 2		Oregon	Oregon State Fairgrounds; Salem, OR	L 4–8	
November 16	3:40 p.m.	Oregon Agricultural	Oregon State Fairgrounds; Salem, OR	W 36–6	1,000
November 28		at Oregon	Kincaid Field; Eugene, OR	L 0–6	1,000

== Game summaries ==
An 1893 ad for the Spalding Model No. J Intercollegiate Football, declared official for 1895 by the Oregon Intercollegiate Football Association.

=== Game 1: Oregon Normal ===
The Willamette team traveled to Monmouth for an October 26 game against Oregon Normal School, today's Western Oregon State College. A sizeable contingent of fans made the 12-mile trip from Salem to the site of the game, bringing with them numerous horns, which raised a deafening blast each time Willamette scored. The horns were to blow many, many times during the course of the afternoon as the visitors demolished the home team by a score of 44 to 6.

At the end of the contest the school's rooters chanted in unison: "Rah, Rah, Rah! / Zip, Boom, Bah / Willamette, Willamette / Ha Ha Ha!" as the elated victors rejoiced.

By previous arrangement the winner of the Willamette–Oregon Normal game was to play the winner of the University of Oregon–Oregon Agricultural College contest in a practic game at the Oregon State Fairgrounds the following week, and Willamette prepared for the challenge.

=== Game 2: Oregon ===
On Saturday, November 2, Willamette met the team of the University of Oregon Webfoots at the State Fairgrounds in a practice game ahead of the regular conference tournament. The game was played in a steady rain which, one young fan noted, "dripped off our neighbors' umbrellas and ran down our necks and up our sleeves and filled our laps and spoiled our dresses and soaked our feet." By the end of the game the field was rendered a bowl of mud.

The Eugene squad was perceived as heavy favorites coming into the day and for the first ten minutes gave every impression of massive superiority as the Willamette ends pinched in too tightly and failed to hold the corners on defense and the halfbacks — who played in this era akin to modern linebackers — failed to fight through blocks to make tackles. The Lemon Yellow scored a touchdown in short order, making the score 4–0 in favor of the visitors following a missed conversion.

Willamette battled back, however, with their star End Guiss breaking off a long run before being run down by Oregon defenders just short of the goal line. Although thwarted on his first attempt, Guiss broke another long run around the left side later in the half to knot the score at 4 to 4. The kick after the touchdown was again unsuccessful.

Macy and Hawley managed to keep Willamette in the game by blocking an astounding six kicks. A small scuffle erupted between Coleman of Oregon and McCormick of Willamette, in which, as the young Salem girl described it, they "got mad and slapped each other's faces and dared each other like two small boys — I didn't think that was at all nice." The crew of three referees shared this assessment and both were thrown out of the game.

A late score won it for the visitors, who triumphed 8 to 4.

=== Game 3: Oregon Agricultural ===
The third game was played against Oregon Agricultural College (today's Oregon State University), and took place on a gridiron field at the Oregon State Fairgrounds. There were 1,000 or more fans on hand to watch the opening kickoff at 3:40 pm, received by Bidwell of the Aggies, who briefly lost control of the ball before being buried under a sea of humanity. The first OAC drive was rapidly halted and Willamette took over, with Walter Paige and Mark Savage successfully gaining ground around end. Savage ultimately scored the first touchdown of the game for the Willamettes at about the 10 minute mark, a 4-point score that was met by wild applause by the fans and the blowing of a multitude of tin horns in celebration. The conversion kick was good and Willamette led by a score of 6 to 0.

Back in possession of the ball and resuming play from midfield, OAC Center Terrell raised the ball and plowed forward into the Willamette defense. The ball was soon turned over, however, with Walter Paige making a long run for the home team, scampering many yards along the sideline. This time it would be Right Halfback Mark Savage finishing for the Willamette team, with Murphy adding a successful conversion to make the score 12 to 0.

Corvallis' team then went on a long drive, taking the ball all the way down to the Willamette 5-yard line, but they failed to score. With time in the half running down, Willamette Right End Guiss broke free on what was described as a "zig-zag play," with his long run setting up a third touchdown of the half for the Salem squad. The 2-point conversion kick was again good and the Willamettes took an 18–0 score into the halftime intermission.

Early in the second half, Willamette Quarterback Murphy broke a long run around end, scoring yet another touchdown. The conversion was missed, leaving the score 22 to zero. On the ensuing possession the Aggies scored their one and only touchdown of the 1895 season when Right Halfback Oberer managed to break a tackle and streak around Willamette's left end. With the successful conversion the score became 22–6.

The Aggies were unable to keep pace, however, giving up another 14 points before the game was called at 5:20 pm on account of a rolling fog that made it impossible to see across the width of the field. The final score: Willamette 36, OAC 6. Both teams exchanged cheers following the conclusion of play and the fans began to rush for the streetcars.

Guiss ended the day with three touchdowns, team captain Murphy with two, and Paige and Mark Savage one each.

=== Game 4: Oregon ===
The final game of the season for Willamette was against the University of Oregon, held on Thanksgiving Day.

== Roster ==
The following individuals played for the 1895 Willamette University team:

Starters

• Left End: Jo Evans
• Left Tackle: Bert Savage
• Left Guard: Truett
• Center: Prof. Hawley
• Right Guard: Williams
• Right Tackle: Albert Macy
• Right End: Guiss

• Quarterback: Murphy (captain)
• Left Halfback: J.M. McCormick
• Right Halfback: Mark Savage
• Fullback: Walter Paige

Reserves

Backs: William Evans, "Brick" Holman; Linemen: Ashenburner, Hibbard, Metachan, Webb
Injured through two games: Babcock, Olinger
