= 1910 Oregon Agricultural Aggies football team =

American college football season

1910 Oregon Agricultural Aggies football
- Conference: Northwest Conference
- Record: 3–2–1 (2–2 Northwest)
- Head coach: George Schildmiller (1st season)
- Captain: Norman "Bird" Hawley
- Home stadium: Bell Field

1910 Northwest Conference football standings
	Conf.					Overall
Team	W		L		T	W		L		T
Washington $	4	–	0	–	0	6	–	0	–	0
Oregon	2	–	0	–	0	4	–	1	–	0
Oregon Agricultural	2	–	2	–	0	3	–	2	–	1
Idaho	2	–	2	–	0	4	–	2	–	0
Washington State	1	–	3	–	0	2	–	3	–	0
Whitman	0	–	4	–	0	2	–	4	–	0
$ – Conference champion

The 1910 Oregon Agricultural Aggies football team represented Oregon Agricultural College (OAC)—now known as Oregon State University—as a member of the Northwest Conference during the 1910 college football season. In their first and only season under head coach George Schildmiller, the Aggies compiled an overall record of 3–2–1 with a mark of 2–2 in conference play, placing third in the Northwest Conference, and were outscored by their opponents by a combined total of 43 to 27. Against major opponents, the Aggies defeated Washington State (9–3) and lost to Oregon (12–0) and Washington (22–0).

The team played its home games at Bell Field in Corvallis, Oregon. Guard Norman "Bird" Hawley, a second-team All-Northwest player in 1909, was the team captain.

== Background ==
Oregon Agricultural College continued with the revolving door of head football coaches, bringing in George Schildmiller for the 1910 season. Schildmiller, a former end at Dartmouth College, had been head coach for the University of Maine Black Bears in 1909.

Captains for forthcoming seasons were traditionally elected by teams at the end of the preceding season. The 1909 team selected Edwin Wallace as its captain for 1910. Wallace did not return to OAC for the 1910–11 academic year, however, necessitating the election of a new field leader. Early in the fall practice the members of the OAC squad elected a new captain, senior Norman "Bird" Hawley, a left guard who had been "discovered during the practice games last year by Coach Metzger" and who had emerged as one of the school's top guards in the history of its football program.

In addition to the "college team," OAC had "class teams" for the freshmen, sophomore, junior, and senior classes of the student body. A series of three games was scheduled — freshmen against sophomores on Friday, October 14; juniors against seniors on Saturday, October 15; and an intramural championship game between the two winners on Friday, October 21.

== Schedule ==
Date	Opponent	Site	Result	Attendance	Source
October 15	O.A.C. alumni*	Bell Field; Corvallis, OR	T 0–0		
October 22	at Willamette*	Athletic Field; Salem, OR	W 9–6		
October 29	vs. Washington State	Multnomah Field; Portland, OR	W 9–3		
November 5	Whitman	Bell Field; Corvallis	W 9–0		
November 12	Oregon	Bell Field; Corvallis (rivalry)	L 0–12	5,000	
November 24	at Washington	Denny Field; Seattle, WA	L 0–22		
*Non-conference game

== Season in review ==
=== October 15: Alumni game ===
The season started with a game against an OAC alumni team. This was not designed as a soft exhibition game against dumpy professors, but rather was structured to be a severe test of the new 1910 squad against recently graduated gridiron starters, including lineman Sam Dolan (soon to become coach of the team), end Chauncey Harding, and back Bert Pilkington. The scoreless tie that was the result was at least as much a success as a failure.

=== October 22: at Willamette University ===
The October 22 match with Willamette University was deemed "the first real game of the season" by the campus press, with the Salem team characterized as "light but speedy."

=== November 12: Oregon ===
The November 12 game against the University of Oregon proved to be one of the most memorable in the entire history of intercollegiate competition between the two primary state-run schools of the state. Gridiron rivalry between Corvallis and Eugene — separated by just 45 miles — was already fierce, with the 1908 OAC team that was coming off a West coast championship having their four-game winning streak ignominiously ended and the 1909 team shut out 12–0. An Oregon "jinx" was spoken of; hopes burned bright that the tide would turn in 1910. The game was later dramatically described in the Portland Oregonian as the "most bitterly fought football game in the history of the two institutions."

Behind a live nanny and a banner reading "U of O CAN'T GET OUR GOAT!", OAC fans perform a serpentine walk during halftime of the 1910 game against Oregon.

Things started poorly for OAC when the opening kickoff was fumbled away on the 10-yard line by Keck. The Beaver defense was able to hold, however, and an attempt at a placekick sailed wide to keep the game scoreless. Oregon managed to win the field position battle, however, and a second field goal attempt in the first quarter was true, with Oregon's Main connecting on a 30-yard kick from placement, giving the visitors a 3–0 lead.

In the second quarter, Oregon's captain, a right halfback named Taylor, broke free on a 47-yard run, setting up a trick play that crossed the goal line. The 5-point touchdown was supplemented with a successful goal after the score, bringing the Oregon lead to 9–0, the lead at halftime. During the intermission, the OAC rooters took over the field to do their signature "serpentine" dance, with a live goat lead at the head of the procession to emphasize the rally squad's slogan, "Oregon can't get our goat!"

Halftime spirit proved insufficient for the undersized Beavers, however, as Oregon again triumphed in a punt-centric field position battle, with Main successfully kicking another field goal from the 31-yard line to put the final 12 on the scoreboard for Oregon. The dominant Oregon squad got close enough for two more field goal attempts in the game's final frame, missing from 40 and 27 yards, respectively. It was no matter.

With victory already in hand, Oregon quarterback Earl Latourette suffered a serious knee injury during the last minute of play, putting a damper on the jubilant mood of the fans of the lemon yellow. The Aggies also had earlier lost an important player for the year, when diminutive quarterback "Shrimp" Reynolds was forced from the game in the second quarter with a broken rib. Reynolds was lost to the team for the year. The day's competition had an edge.

=== The Rooter Cap Riot ===
It was after the game at the train depot that things got out of hand. Recalling events five years after the fact, one Oregon participant recalled the scene:

"A machine carrying an injured player [Latourette] was challenged for the password, and colors — together with handy parts of the auto — were jerked to earth. Several hundred proud pennants, armbands, and rooter hats flew mysteriously to new owners without legal transfers of title. A thousand tempers were lost and as many oaths spoken. One zealous rooter was treated to a haircut that slicked his dome right down to the quick. In a rush at the depot, one student was floored with a bump on the head and carted away in an unconscious condition. A freshman lost his green cap because he had to keep both hands on his crutches in order to stand up. This wasn't all, but perhaps the rest wouldn't pass the board of censorship."

The Portland press had a field day. Monday the "Post-Football Row" was front page news. The Oregonian charged that "students of the University of Oregon...were attacked on the streets and at the depot following the game," with many "robbed of their college hats" and "one boy felled unconscious to the sidewalk" and hospitalized in Eugene. "Another's head was shaved and even other depredations are charged," the paper breathlessly added. The greater part of this violence was attributed to "persons not connected with [OAC]," the Oregonian reporter indicated.

The injured student, Harold Bean, son of a Federal judge from Portland, charged that he had been struck by a lineman on the Aggies' freshman football team named King. The Oregon student who had his hair clipped was reported as Herman Sigglin of Portland, a former OAC student who was targeted by a group of 8 or 10 people he knew personally.

Guard Norman "Bird" Hawley, team captain of the 1910 Aggies football team.

A group of OAC partisans began running the streets, indiscriminately grabbing all the green rooters' caps they could find. The scrum moved to the Union depot, where for the next 90 minutes both sides worked to forcibly obtain "enemy" souvenirs, while competing school yells were shouted. University of Oregon president P.L. Campbell attempted to quell the situation, only to be jeered by Corvallis participants, whom Campbell stated were probably not affiliated with the college. He spent the night in Corvallis, conferring with his opposites and laying the groundwork for a formal investigation.

An unofficial explanation from the Beaver point of view was also published by the Oregonian, in which it was claimed that students from both sides had started a general grabbing of rooter's hats in which "the Eugene boys were equally guilty and the entire proceeding was in the spirit of college fun." The damaged car had Oregon-themed bunting attached to the horn and headlight, which had been inadvertently damaged in a rush to forcibly remove it, it was claimed, with a brief fight following the attack of the car resulting in no injury to either of the two participants. The injury to Harold Bean had been an accident befalling him during the mad scrum for hats, the Corvallis reply indicated, while Sigglin's hair removal had been payback for uncomplimentary remarks said to have been made against OAC at a rally in Eugene earlier in the week. The allegation that OAC students had hissed U of O President Campbell was firmly denied.

== Legacy ==
The drama and fisticuffs following the Oregon game had a lasting impact. In a statement issued to the press in the aftermath, Oregon President Campbell attributed the affair to "a few unruly spirits" and expressed the hope that the affair "should not be allowed to affect the relations of the two institutions." OAC president William Jasper Kerr was traveling in the East and was unavailable for comment.
