= 1910 Oregon Webfoots football team =

American college football season

1910 Oregon Webfoots football
- Conference: Northwest Conference
- Record: 4–1 (2–0 Northwest)
- Head coach: Bill Warner (1st season)
- Captain: Charles Taylor
- Home stadium: Kincaid Field

1910 Northwest Conference football standings
| | Conf. | | | | | Overall |
| Team | W | | L | | T | W | | L | | T |
|---|---|---|---|---|---|---|---|---|---|---|
| Washington $ | 4 | – | 0 | – | 0 | 6 | – | 0 | – | 0 |
| Oregon | 2 | – | 0 | – | 0 | 4 | – | 1 | – | 0 |
| Oregon Agricultural | 2 | – | 2 | – | 0 | 3 | – | 2 | – | 1 |
| Idaho | 2 | – | 2 | – | 0 | 4 | – | 2 | – | 0 |
| Washington State | 1 | – | 3 | – | 0 | 2 | – | 3 | – | 0 |
| Whitman | 0 | – | 4 | – | 0 | 2 | – | 4 | – | 0 |
$ – Conference champion

The 1910 Oregon Webfoots football team represented the University of Oregon as a member of the Northwest Conference during the 1910 college football season. Led by first-year head coach Bill Warner, the Webfoots compiled an overall record of 4–1 with a mark of 2–0 in conference play, placing second in the Northwest Conference.

== Schedule ==
| Date | Opponent | Site | Result | Source |
|---|---|---|---|---|
| October 15 | Oregon alumni* | Kincaid Field; Eugene, OR | W 16–6 | |
| October 22 | Puget Sound* | Kincaid Field; Eugene, OR | W 114–0 | |
| October 29 | at Idaho | Moscow, ID | W 29–0 | |
| November 12 | at Oregon Agricultural | Bell Field; Corvallis, OR (rivalry) | W 12–0 | |
| November 24 | at Multnomah Athletic Club* | Multnomah Field; Portland, OR | L 0–5 | |
*Non-conference game; Source:
