= Willis C. Hawley =

American politician (1864–1941)

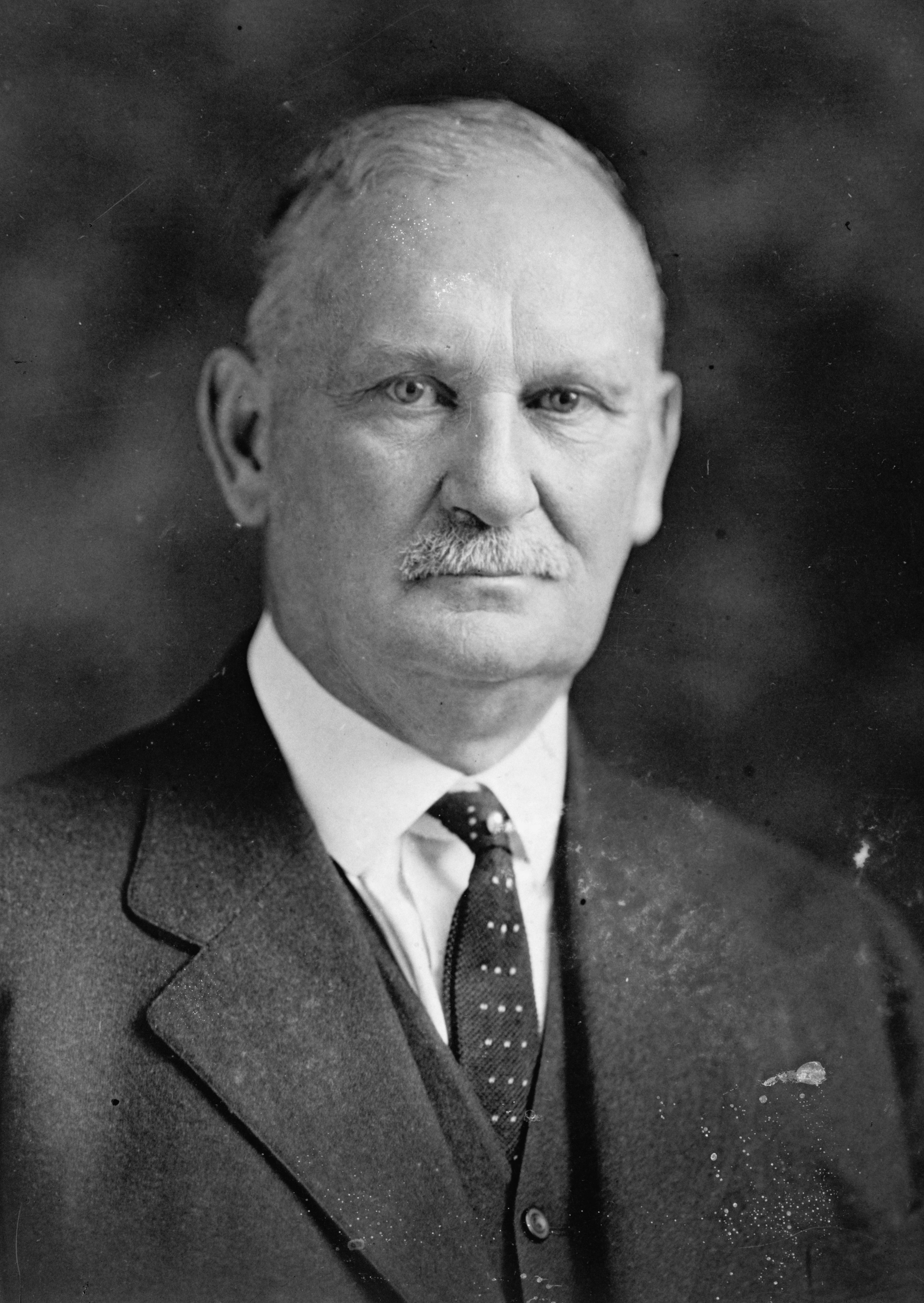
- Hawley in 1923

Member of the U.S. House of Representatives from Oregon's 1st district
- In office March 4, 1907 – March 3, 1933
- Preceded by: Binger Hermann
- Succeeded by: James W. Mott

Personal details
- Born: Willis Chatman Hawley; May 5, 1864 Monroe, Oregon, U.S.
- Died: July 24, 1941 (aged 77) Salem, Oregon, U.S.
- Resting place: City View Cemetery
- Party: Republican
- Education: Willamette University

Willis Chatman Hawley (May 5, 1864 – July 24, 1941) was an American politician and educator in the state of Oregon. A native of the state, he served as the president of Willamette University in Salem, Oregon, where he earned his undergraduate and law degrees before entering politics. A Republican, he served 13 terms as a member of the United States House of Representatives from Oregon, from 1907 to 1933. He is best known as a lead sponsor of the Smoot–Hawley Tariff Act in 1930.

== Early life ==
Hawley was born on a farm in the old Belknap settlement near Monroe in Benton County, Oregon, on May 5, 1864. After he attended country schools, he entered college. In 1884, he graduated with a Bachelor of Science degree from Willamette University in Salem, Oregon. Hawley was the principal of the Umpqua Academy from 1884–86. In 1888, he received a Bachelor of Arts degree from the school, and a Bachelor of Laws from the law department.

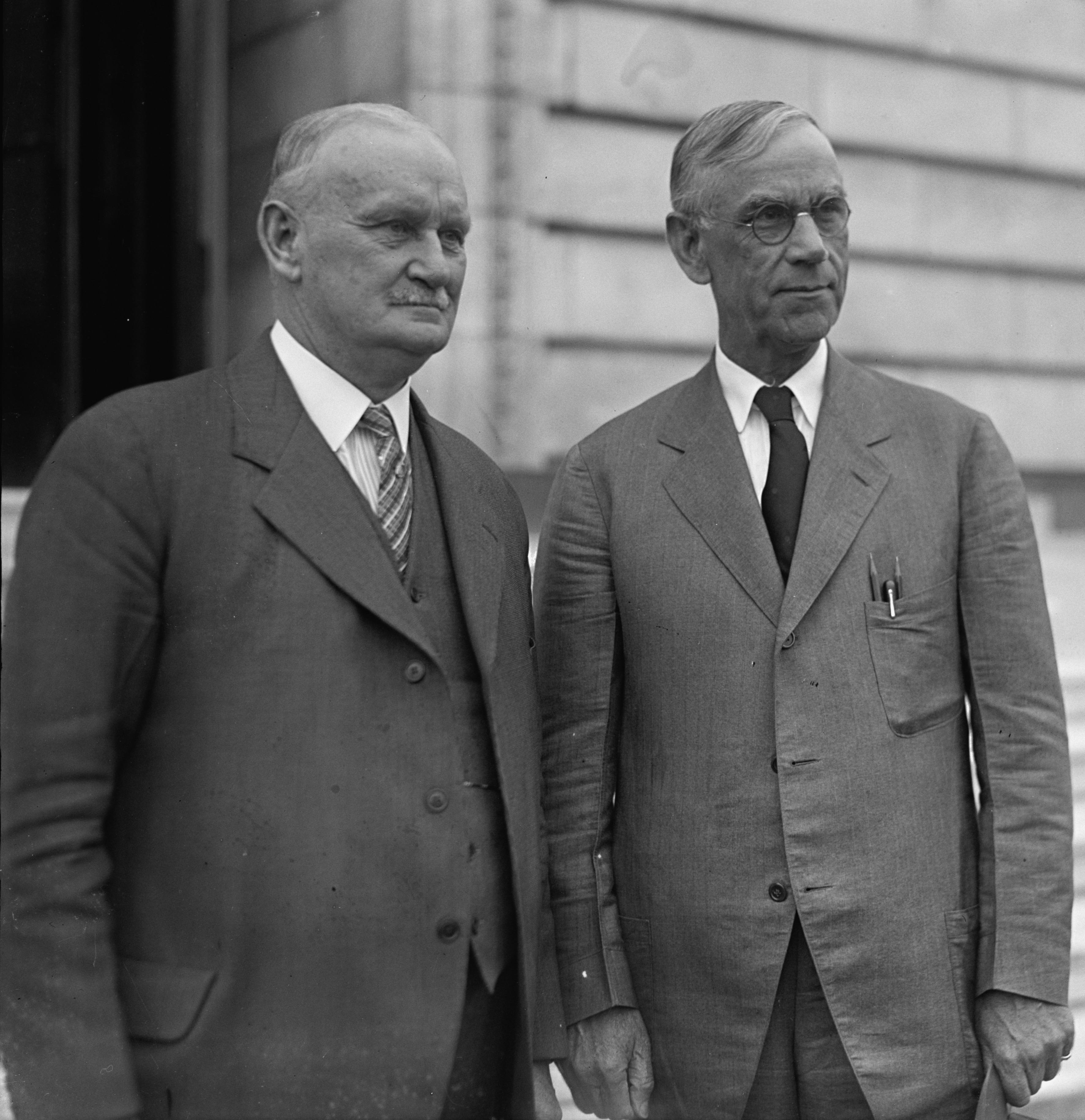
Hawley (left) and Reed Smoot in April 1929, shortly before the Smoot–Hawley Tariff Act passed the House

From 1888–1891, he served as president of the Oregon State Normal School at Drain, south of Eugene. In 1890, he earned a master's degree from Willamette. In 1891, he joined the faculty at Willamette. Hawley became the president of Willamette, serving as president from 1893 to 1902, while he was a professor of history and economics for sixteen years at Willamette.

Then, he engaged in a variety of business and educational ventures before entering politics. Hawley became a member of the National Forest Reservation Commission and a member of the Special Committee on Rural Credits, created by Congress in 1915. He served as a member of the Commission for the Celebration of the Two Hundredth Anniversary of the Birth of President and General George Washington.

== Politics ==
In 1906, Hawley won Oregon's 1st congressional district as a Republican. He was then re-elected every two years to Congress for the next 12 sessions of Congress. Hawley served in Washington, D.C., from March 4, 1907, until March 3, 1933.

While in Congress, he was chairman of the Committee on Ways and Means for the Seventieth and Seventy-first Congresses. In 1930, Hawley was a co-sponsor of the Smoot–Hawley Tariff, which raised import tariffs to record levels.

In 1932, Hawley was defeated in his bid for renomination to his House seat, and left office in March 1933. He returned to Salem, where he practiced law.

== Death and burial ==
He died on July 24, 1941, at the age of 77 in Salem, and was buried in Salem's City View Cemetery.

U.S. House of Representatives
Preceded by Binger Hermann	U.S. Representative of Oregon's 1st congressional district 1907–1933	Succeeded by James W. Mott
Academic offices
Preceded by George Whitaker	President of Willamette University; 1891–1902	Succeeded by John Hamline Coleman
