= Percy Benson =

American football player and coach

Biographical details
- Born: January 13, 1874; Oakland, California, U.S.
- Died: March 14, 1949 (aged 76); Taft, California, U.S.
- Education: University of California, Berkeley

Playing career
- 1892–1894: California
- Position: Quarterback

Coaching career (HC unless noted)
- 1895: Oregon
- 1897: Butte Athletic Club

Head coaching record
- Overall: 4–0 (college); 3–0 (club)

Accomplishments and honors

Championships
- conference

Henry Percy Benson (January 13, 1874 – March 14, 1949) was an American football player and coach. He played college football as a quarterback at the University of California, Berkeley from 1892 to 1894. He served as the head football coach at the University of Oregon in Eugene, Oregon during 1895, compiling a record of 4–0. Benson also coached the Butte Athletic Club of Butte, Montana in 1897.

== Head coaching record ==
=== College ===
Year	Team	Overall	Conference	Standing	Bowl/playoffs
Oregon Webfoots (Oregon Intercollegiate Football Association) (1895)
1895	Oregon	4–0	4–0	1st	
Oregon:		4–0	4–0		
Total:		4–0			
National championship Conference title Conference division title or championship game berth
