= Paul Downing =

American football player and coach (1873–1944)

Biographical details
- Born: November 27, 1873; Newark, Missouri, U.S.
- Died: December 11, 1944 (aged 71); San Francisco, California, U.S.

Playing career
- 1891–1894: Stanford

Coaching career (HC unless noted)
- 1895: Oregon Agricultural

Head coaching record
- Overall: 0–2–1

Paul Milton Downing (November 27, 1873 – December 11, 1944) was an American college football player and coach. He played at Stanford University and was the head coach at Oregon Agricultural College (today's Oregon State University). While at Stanford, he was friends with classmate and future United States President Herbert Hoover.

After his football days, Downing went on to become a top executive at Pacific Gas and Electric Company. He was actively involved in creation of hydroelectric power facilities. He died at the age of 71 on December 11, 1944, in San Francisco, California.

== Football ==
=== Stanford ===
Downing played four years for the Stanford Cardinal football team, never missing a minute of play in all four years. Downing played in the first Big Game matchup between Stanford and the University of California, Berkeley.

=== Oregon Agriculture College ===
In 1895, Downing became the third head coach of Oregon Agricultural College and held the post for the program's third season. He served as the head coach for the 1895 season and his team produced a record of 0 wins, 2 losses, and 1 tie.

== Head coaching record ==
Year	Team	Overall	Conference	Standing	Bowl/playoffs
Oregon Agricultural Aggies (Oregon Intercollegiate Football Association) (1895)
1895	Oregon Agricultural	0–2–1			
Oregon Agricultural:		0–2–1			
Total:		0–2–1			

== See also ==
- History of Oregon State Beavers football
