= 1909 Washington State football team =

American college football season

1909 Washington State football

Northwest Conference co-champion
- Conference: Northwest Conference
- Record: 4–1 (2–0 Northwest)
- Head coach: Willis Kienholz (1st season)
- Captain: Cecil Cave
- Home stadium: Rogers Field

1909 Northwest Conference football standings
	Conf.					Overall
Team	W		L		T	W		L		T
Washington +	4	–	0	–	0	7	–	0	–	0
Washington State +	2	–	0	–	0	4	–	1	–	0
Oregon	2	–	1	–	0	3	–	2	–	0
Oregon Agricultural	1	–	2	–	0	4	–	2	–	1
Whitman	1	–	3	–	0	4	–	3	–	1
Idaho	0	–	4	–	0	3	–	4	–	0
+ – Conference co-champions

The 1909 Washington State football team was an American football team that represented Washington State College as a member of the Northwest Conference during the 1909 college football season. Led by Willis Kienholz in his first and only season as head coach, the team compiled an overall record of 4– 1with a mark of 2–0 in conference play, sharing the Northwest Conference title with Washington.

== Schedule ==
Date	Time	Opponent	Site	Result	Attendance	Source
October 20		Puget Sound*	Rogers Field; Pullman, WA	W 74–0		
November 5		at Idaho	MacLean Field; Moscow, ID (rivalry)	W 18–0		
November 16		Whitworth*	Rogers Field; Pullman, WA	W 38–0		
November 25		at Whitman	Ankeny Field; Walla Walla, WA	W 23–6		
December 4	2:00 p.m.	Denver*	Recreation Park; Spokane, WA	L 6–11	2,000	
*Non-conference game; Source:
