= 1910 Washington football team =

American college football season

1910 Washington football
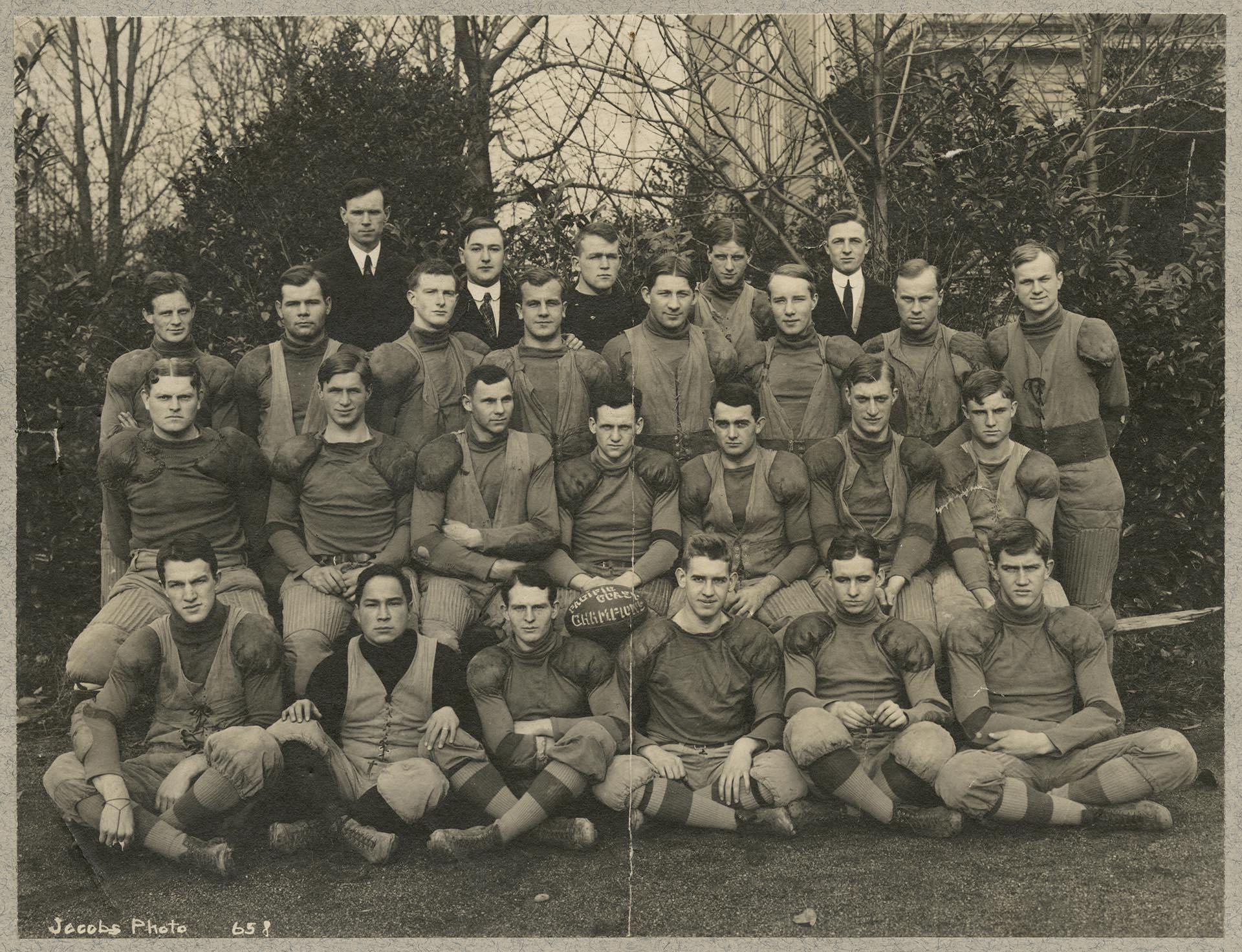

Northwest Conference champion
- Conference: Northwest Conference
- Record: 6–0 (4–0 Northwest)
- Head coach: Gil Dobie (3rd season)
- Captain: Huber Grimm
- Home stadium: Denny Field

1910 Northwest Conference football standings
	Conf.					Overall
Team	W		L		T	W		L		T
Washington $	4	–	0	–	0	6	–	0	–	0
Oregon	2	–	0	–	0	4	–	1	–	0
Oregon Agricultural	2	–	2	–	0	3	–	2	–	1
Idaho	2	–	2	–	0	4	–	2	–	0
Washington State	1	–	3	–	0	2	–	3	–	0
Whitman	0	–	4	–	0	2	–	4	–	0
$ – Conference champion

The 1910 Washington football team was an American football team that represented the University of Washington as a member of the Northwest Conference during the 1910 college football season. In its third season under coach Gil Dobie, the team compiled a 6–0 record with a mark of 4–0 in conference play, winning the Northwest Conference title, shut out five of six opponents, and outscored all opponents by a combined total of 150 to 8. Huber Grimm was the team captain.

Bill Libby chose Washington as the 1910 national champion in his book, Champions of College Football.

== Schedule ==
Date	Opponent	Site	Result	Attendance	Source
October 8	Lincoln High School*	Denny Field; Seattle, WA	W 20–0	1,500	
October 15	at Puget Sound*	Tacoma, WA	W 51–0	1,500	
October 22	Whitman	Denny Field; Seattle, WA	W 12–8	4,500	
November 5	Idaho	Denny Field; Seattle, WA	W 29–0	1,500	
November 12	vs. Washington State	Recreation Park; Spokane, WA (rivalry)	W 16–0	2,600	
November 24	Oregon Agricultural	Denny Field; Seattle, WA	W 22–0	6,000	
*Non-conference game; Source:
