= 1909 Idaho football team =

American college football season

1909 Idaho football
- Conference: Northwest Conference
- Record: 3–4 (0–4 Northwest)
- Head coach: John S. Grogan (1st season)

1909 Northwest Conference football standings
| | Conf. | | | | | Overall |
| Team | W | | L | | T | W | | L | | T |
|---|---|---|---|---|---|---|---|---|---|---|
| Washington + | 4 | – | 0 | – | 0 | 7 | – | 0 | – | 0 |
| Washington State + | 2 | – | 0 | – | 0 | 4 | – | 1 | – | 0 |
| Oregon | 2 | – | 1 | – | 0 | 3 | – | 2 | – | 0 |
| Oregon Agricultural | 1 | – | 2 | – | 0 | 4 | – | 2 | – | 1 |
| Whitman | 1 | – | 3 | – | 0 | 4 | – | 3 | – | 1 |
| Idaho | 0 | – | 4 | – | 0 | 3 | – | 4 | – | 0 |
+ – Conference co-champions

The 1909 Idaho football team represented the University of Idaho as a member of the Northwest Conference during the 1909 college football season. Led by John S. Grogan in his first and only season as head coach, Idaho compiled an overall record of 3–4 with a mark of 0–4 in conference play, placing last out of six teams in the Northwest Conference.

== Schedule ==
| Date | Opponent | Site | Result | Source |
|---|---|---|---|---|
| October 16 | Puget Sound* | Moscow, ID | W 29–0 | |
| October 23 | Whitman | Moscow, ID | L 6–30 | |
| October 30 | vs. Washington | Recreation Park; Spokane, WA | L 0–50 | |
| November 5 | Washington State | Moscow, ID (Battle of the Palouse) | L 0–18 | |
| November 13 | vs. Oregon | Multnomah Field; Portland, OR | L 6–22 | |
| November 25 | at Boise All Collegians* | Boise, ID | W 21–0 | |
| November 27 | at College of Idaho* | Caldwell, ID | W 24–0 | |
*Non-conference game
