= Thomas Van Scoy =

American clergyman and educator

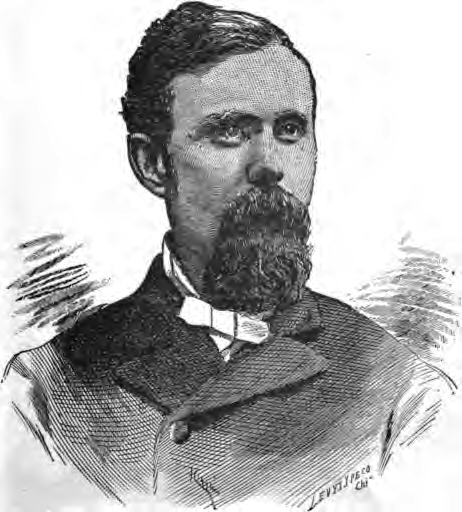
- Van Scoy around 1884

6th President of Willamette University
- In office 1880–1891
- Preceded by: Charles E. Lambert
- Succeeded by: George Whitaker

Personal details
- Born: February 13, 1848 White County, Indiana
- Died: February 11, 1901 (aged 52) Helena, Montana
- Spouse(s): Jennie E. Thomas; Jessie Eastham
- Children: 2
- Education: Northwestern University
- Profession: Educator, minister
- Willamette University info

Thomas Van Scoy (February 13, 1848 – February 11, 1901) was an American minister and educator in Indiana, Oregon, and Montana. A Methodist, he served as the sixth president of Willamette University and as president of the now defunct Portland University. He was also president of Montana Wesleyan University and served in the militia at the end of the American Civil War.

== Early years ==
Thomas Van Scoy was born in White County, Indiana, to William Van Scoy and his wife Mary (née Channel) on February 13, 1848. Thomas was the youngest of fourteen children in the family. Their father was a farmer from what became West Virginia, while their mother was from Ohio. In 1855, the family moved to Iowa where they continued to farm. Van Scoy's parents and the three youngest children in the family returned to the Indiana farm in 1860 after difficult times in Iowa. In Indiana, Van Scoy received his education in the local schools before joining the militia in 1865 during the American Civil War. He served one year in Company I of the Indiana Volunteers, posted as a guard in the Shenandoah Valley.

After leaving the infantry in 1866, he enrolled at a school in Brookston, Indiana, for a few months and then at the Battle Ground Collegiate Institute. Van Scoy spent two years at the institute and while in school was also a school teacher. He then enrolled at Brookston Academy where he spent one year before entering Northwestern University in neighboring Illinois where he was a member of Phi Gamma Delta. Following two-years of study, he left to take the position of principal at Brookston, but resigned there three years later to return to college. In 1875, he graduated from Northwestern (later inducted into the Phi Beta Kappa honor society) and began working as a minister in Rensselaer, Indiana, for the Methodist Episcopal Church. On September 22, 1875, he married Jennie E. Thomas. After three years he left to continue his education at the Garrett Biblical Institute in Evanston, Illinois, where he graduated in 1879.

== Oregon ==
In 1879, he was hired by Willamette University in Salem, Oregon, to be chairman of the Greek department and to teach ancient languages. Part of the reason for the move was to attempt to improve the health of his wife, but this was unsuccessful and she died in 1883. After he was hired at Willamette, Charles E. Lambert resigned as president of the institution and Van Scoy was hired as the sixth president of Willamette University in 1880. At Willamette he purchased the former home of the first graduate of the school for use as a school for women in 1880. He purchased the home with his own money and remodeled the home, with the building later moved to the campus and renamed as Lausanne Hall.

In 1884, Van Scoy was granted a doctor of divinity degree by the University of the Pacific. Van Scoy remarried in 1885 to Jessie Eastham, and they had one son named Paul, while he previously had a daughter named Lena with his first wife. In February 1887, he purchased the desks that were formerly at the Oregon State Capital across the street from the school. Van Scoy resigned from Willamette in June 1891 to become dean at the new Methodist school in Portland, Portland University. He also served as president of that school, and due to financial difficulties moved the school to East Portland, though some classes were held in Downtown Portland. The school later closed in 1900 and the campus overlooking the Willamette River and Swan Island was sold. The campus included West Hall, and was sold to the Catholic Church, eventually becoming the University of Portland. Van Scoy was the first minister at the Montavilla Methodist Church in Southeast Portland, dedicating a new building on October 19, 1893.

== Later years ==
In 1898, Van Scoy left Oregon for Montana in order to be the new president of Montana Wesleyan University (eventually became part of Rocky Mountain College) near Helena. As president he moved the school to the city in 1900. Though he never held political office, he was a supporter of the Republican Party. Thomas Van Scoy died on February 11, 1901, in Helena at the age of 52 and was buried in that city.

Academic offices
Preceded by Charles E. Lambert	President of Willamette University; 1880–1891	Succeeded by George Whitaker
