= John S. Grogan =

American athlete and coach (1880–1952)

John Grogan
Biographical details
- Born: September 24, 1880; Streator, Illinois, U.S.
- Died: October 22, 1952 (aged 72); Wadena, Minnesota, U.S.

Playing career

Football
- 1900–1903: Knox (IL)

Coaching career (HC unless noted)

Football
- 1904–1908: Fargo
- 1909: Idaho

Basketball
- 1908–1910: Idaho

Baseball
- 1910: Idaho

Head coaching record
- Overall: 3–4 (football, Idaho only); 15–19 (basketball); 5–12 (baseball)

John Sebastion Grogan (September 24, 1880 – October 22, 1952) was an American college football player and coach. He played football at Knox College in Galesburg, Illinois from 1900 to 1903, where he dropkicked a 55-yard field goal in an upset win over the Illinois Fighting Illini. Grogan served as the head football, basketball and baseball coach at the University of Idaho in Moscow, Idaho during the 1909–10 academic year.

== Head coaching record ==
=== Football ===
Year	Team	Overall	Conference	Standing	Bowl/playoffs
Idaho (Northwest Conference) (1909)
1909	Idaho	3–4	0–4	6th	
Idaho:		3–4	0–4		
Total:					
