= 1910 Washington State football team =

American college football season

1910 Washington State football
- Conference: Northwest Conference
- Record: 2–3 (1–3 Northwest)
- Head coach: Oscar Osthoff (1st season)
- Captain: Fredrick Hunter
- Home stadium: Rogers Field

1910 Northwest Conference football standings
	Conf.					Overall
Team	W		L		T	W		L		T
Washington $	4	–	0	–	0	6	–	0	–	0
Oregon	2	–	0	–	0	4	–	1	–	0
Oregon Agricultural	2	–	2	–	0	3	–	2	–	1
Idaho	2	–	2	–	0	4	–	2	–	0
Washington State	1	–	3	–	0	2	–	3	–	0
Whitman	0	–	4	–	0	2	–	4	–	0
$ – Conference champion

The 1910 Washington State football team was an American football team that represented Washington State College s a member of the Northwest Conference during the 1910 college football season. Led by first-year head coach Oscar Osthoff, Washington State compiled an overall record of 2–3 with a mark of 1–3 in conference play, placing fifth in the Northwest Conference.

== Schedule ==
Date	Opponent	Site	Result	Attendance	Source
October 21	Idaho	Rogers Field; Pullman, WA (rivalry)	L 5–9		
October 29	vs. Oregon Agricultural	Multnomah Field; Portland, OR	L 3–9		
November 1	at Multnomah Athletic Club*	Multnomah Field; Portland, OR	W 9–0		
November 12	Washington	Recreation Park; Spokane, WA (rivalry)	L 0–16	2,600	
November 24	at Whitman	Ankeny Field; Walla Walla, WA	W 8–0	1,000	
*Non-conference game
