= George Whitaker (Oregon educator) =

American university president (1836–1917)

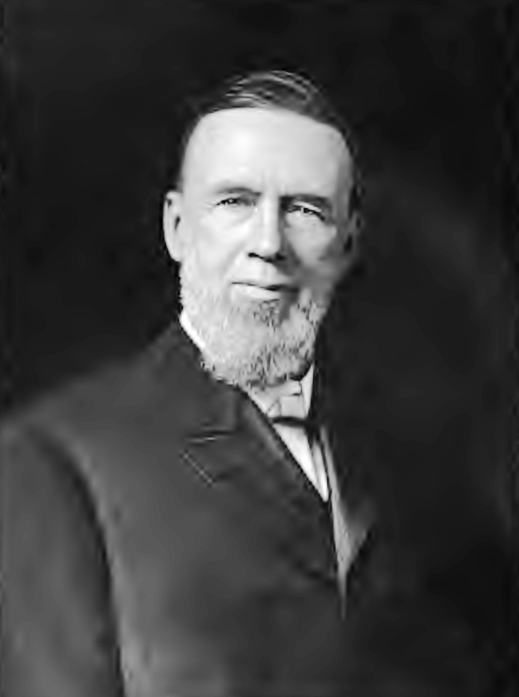
- Whitaker in his later years

7th President of Willamette University
- In office 1891–1893
- Preceded by: Thomas Van Scoy
- Succeeded by: Willis C. Hawley

Personal details
- Born: May 14, 1836 Boston, Massachusetts
- Died: November 1, 1917 (aged 81) Somerville, Massachusetts
- Spouse: Harriet Clarke (m. 1861)
- Education: Wesleyan University; Fort Worth University
- Profession: Educator, minister
- Willamette University info

George Whitaker (May 14, 1836 – November 1, 1917) was an American minister and university president in Texas and Oregon. A native of Massachusetts, he served as the president of Wiley College in Texas, along with Willamette University and Portland University in Oregon. A Methodist trained preacher and graduate of Wesleyan University, he also worked as a pastor across the country in the late 19th century, primarily in New England.

== Early years ==
George Whitaker was born on May 14, 1836, to Catherine Cravath Holland and Edgar Kimball Whitaker in Boston, Massachusetts. Raised on a farm, he was the third oldest among eleven children in the family. His father was a merchant of English heritage who worked for the United States Customs in Boston and New Orleans, also acting as a clerk in Washington, D.C. for the Department of the Treasury. George's great-grandfather, Nathaniel Whitaker, helped found Dartmouth College. He received his early education in Massachusetts at schools such as the Bridgewater Normal School (now Bridgewater State College), the Wesleyan Academy in Wilbraham, and the West Newton Model School.

Whitaker moved on to college at Wesleyan University in Middletown, Connecticut, where he earned a Bachelor of Arts degree in 1861. At the school he was a member of the Phi Nu Theta and Phi Beta Kappa fraternities. On June 22, 1861, he married Harriet Clarke from Forestville, Connecticut, and they had four children; Harriet Clarke, George Edgar, John Holland, and a son who died as an infant. Whitaker then started working as a pastor for the Methodist Episcopal church in West Medway, Massachusetts, in 1861 and remained until 1863. In 1863, he moved on to the church in South Walpole where he remained until 1864. During this time, he continued his studies and earned a Master of Arts degree from Wesleyan in 1864, where his brother Nicholas also attended.

In 1865, he began preaching at the church in Roxbury followed by Lowell from 1867 to 1869. Whitaker then moved on to the church in Westfield in 1870, the Boston Street Church in Lynn in 1872, and the Saratoga Street church in Boston in 1873. From 1874 to 1878 he served as a presiding elder for the Springfield District of the church before returning to preaching at Ipswich, Massachusetts where he was stationed until 1879. He moved on to the Trinity Church in Cambridge where he served from 1879 to 1882, and to the First Church in Somerville from that year until 1884. In 1885, he began service at the Grace Church in Worcester, remaining until 1888.

== Educator ==
Whitaker began a career as an administrator at Methodist colleges in 1888. He started at Wiley College, a school for Blacks in Marshall, Texas, succeeding N. D. Clifford. Serving as president from 1888 until 1891, he also was granted a doctor of divinity from Fort Worth University in Texas in 1890. In 1891, he took the same position at Willamette University in Salem, Oregon, with P. A. Pool replacing him at Wiley.

He became the seventh president of the university on July 25, 1891, replacing Thomas Van Scoy who had left to help establish Portland University in a split with Willamette. Whitaker also served on the faculty as a professor of mental and moral science. As president he banned talking between the sexes at the school and banned walking with members of the opposite sex, which was unusual for the school. On September 16, 1891, the main building on campus, University Hall, lost its roof in a fire. Whitaker was able to have classes resume two-and-half hours later. He also suggested renaming the building as Waller Hall, which did occur many years later.

Whitaker was responsible for establishing a graduate program in 1892 to confer the degree of doctor of philosophy. During his tenure he clashed with the board of trustees, the students, and faculty over his old fashioned ways and made an attempt to gain full control over the university in 1893, threatening to resign. The trustees declined giving him the power he sought, and he resigned from the school that year. He was replaced by Willis C. Hawley who had been a mathematics teacher at the school.

Following his tenure at Willamette, Whitaker moved to Portland, Oregon, where he was the pastor at St. Paul's Church in 1893, followed by the same position in Detroit, Michigan, from 1894 to 1896. He then returned to Massachusetts from 1897 to 1899 to preach at two churches in that state. In 1899, he was hired to be the president of Portland University, Willamette's financially failing rival, and where his son John Holland earned a degree. Whitaker served as the president until its end, working out a deal to merge what remained of the school into Willamette.

== Later years ==
After leaving Oregon, he returned to be pastor at the Trinity Church in Cambridge, Massachusetts, serving from 1900 to 1905. Whitaker then held positions in Lowell, Orient Heights, and Linden. In civic affairs he was a member of the Republican Party, the Sons of Temperance, the Temple of Honor, the Evening Star, and a Freemason. He also was the librarian of the New England Methodist Historical Society at one time. George Whitaker died at his home in Somerville, Massachusetts on November 1, 1917.

Academic offices
Preceded by N. D. Clifford	4th President of Wiley College; 1888–1891	Succeeded by P. A. Pool
Preceded by Thomas Van Scoy	7th President of Willamette University; 1891–1893	Succeeded by Willis C. Hawley
