= 1909 Whitman Fighting Missionaries football team =

American college football season

1909 Whitman Fighting Missionaries football
- Conference: Northwest Conference
- Record: 4–3–1 (1–3 Northwest)
- Head coach: J. Merrill Blanchard (2nd season)
- Home stadium: Ankeny Field

1909 Northwest Conference football standings
	Conf.					Overall
Team	W		L		T	W		L		T
Washington +	4	–	0	–	0	7	–	0	–	0
Washington State +	2	–	0	–	0	4	–	1	–	0
Oregon	2	–	1	–	0	3	–	2	–	0
Oregon Agricultural	1	–	2	–	0	4	–	2	–	1
Whitman	1	–	3	–	0	4	–	3	–	1
Idaho	0	–	4	–	0	3	–	4	–	0
+ – Conference co-champions

The 1909 Whitman Fighting Missionaries football team represented Whitman College as a member of the Northwest Conference during the 1909 college football season. Under second-year head coach J. Merrill Blanchard, Whitman finished with a record of 4–3–1, with a mark of 1–3 in conference play for fifth place in the Northwest. Whitman played their home games at Ankeny Field in Walla Walla, Washington.

== Schedule ==
Date	Opponent	Site	Result	Attendance	Source
September 27	Walla Walla High School*	Ankeny Field; Walla Walla, WA	W 8–0 (practice)		
October 1	Walla Walla High School*	Ankeny Field; Walla Walla, WA	W 10–0	250	
October 8	Pendleton High School (OR)*	Ankeny Field; Walla Walla, WA	W 33–0		
October 15	Columbia College (WA)*	Ankeny Field; Walla Walla, WA	W 53–0		
October 23	at Idaho	Moscow, ID	W 30–6		
October 29	Oregon Agricultural	Ankeny Field; Walla Walla, WA	L 6–10		
November 6	at Washington	Denny Field; Seattle, WA	L 0–17	3,000	
November 12	Whitworth*	Ankeny Field; Walla Walla, WA	T 0–0		
November 25	Washington State	Ankeny Field; Walla Walla, WA	L 6–23		
*Non-conference game; Source:
