= 1894 Oregon Webfoots football team =

American college football season

1894 Oregon Webfoots football
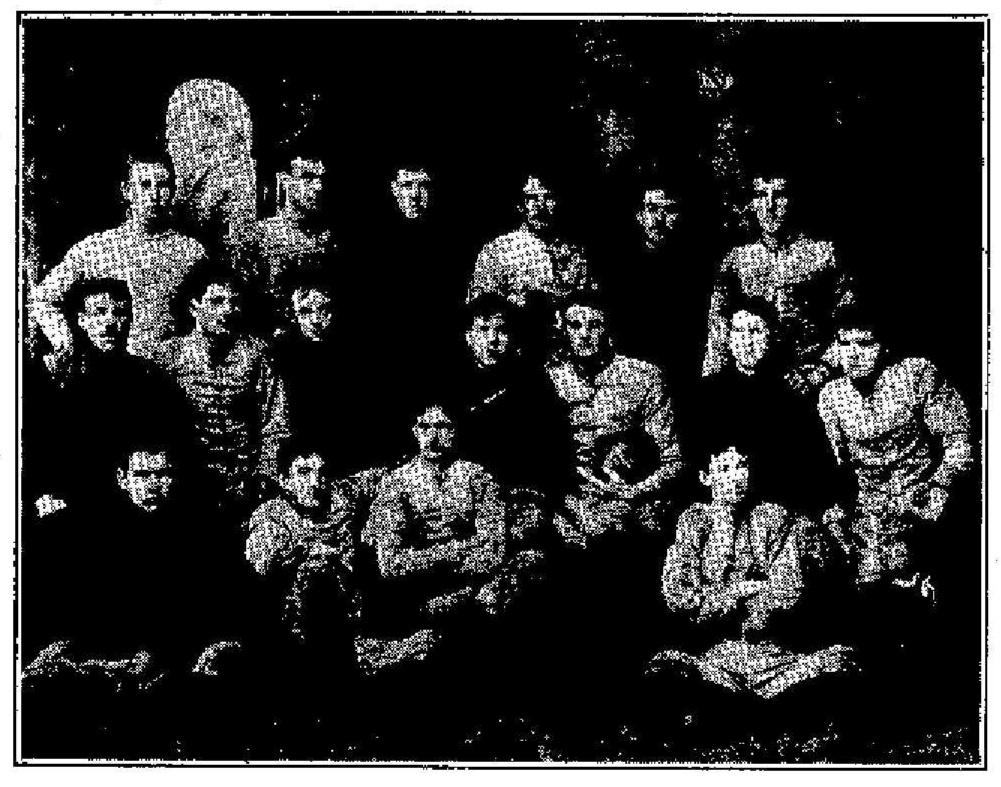
- Conference: Oregon Intercollegiate Football Association
- Record: 0–2–1 ( OIFA)
- Head coach: J. A. Church (1st season)
- Captain: Frank Mathews
- Home stadium: Stewart's Field

The 1894 Oregon Webfoots football team represented the University of Oregon as a member of the Oregon Intercollegiate Football Association (OIFA) during the 1894 college football season. The team was led by coach J. A. Church. They finished the season with an overall record of 0–2–1. The first Oregon football team played on the field that is now the site of the university's Computing Center and Gilbert Hall.

== Schedule ==
Date	Time	Opponent	Site	Result	Source
November 3	2:00 p.m.	at Oregon Agricultural	Corvallis, OR (rivalry)	L 0–18	
November 17	2:30 p.m.	at Portland University	Multnomah Field; Portland, OR	L 0–12	
November 29	2:30 p.m.	Pacific (OR)	Stewart's Field; Eugene, OR	T 0–0	
