= 1909 Oregon Webfoots football team =

American college football season

1909 Oregon Webfoots football
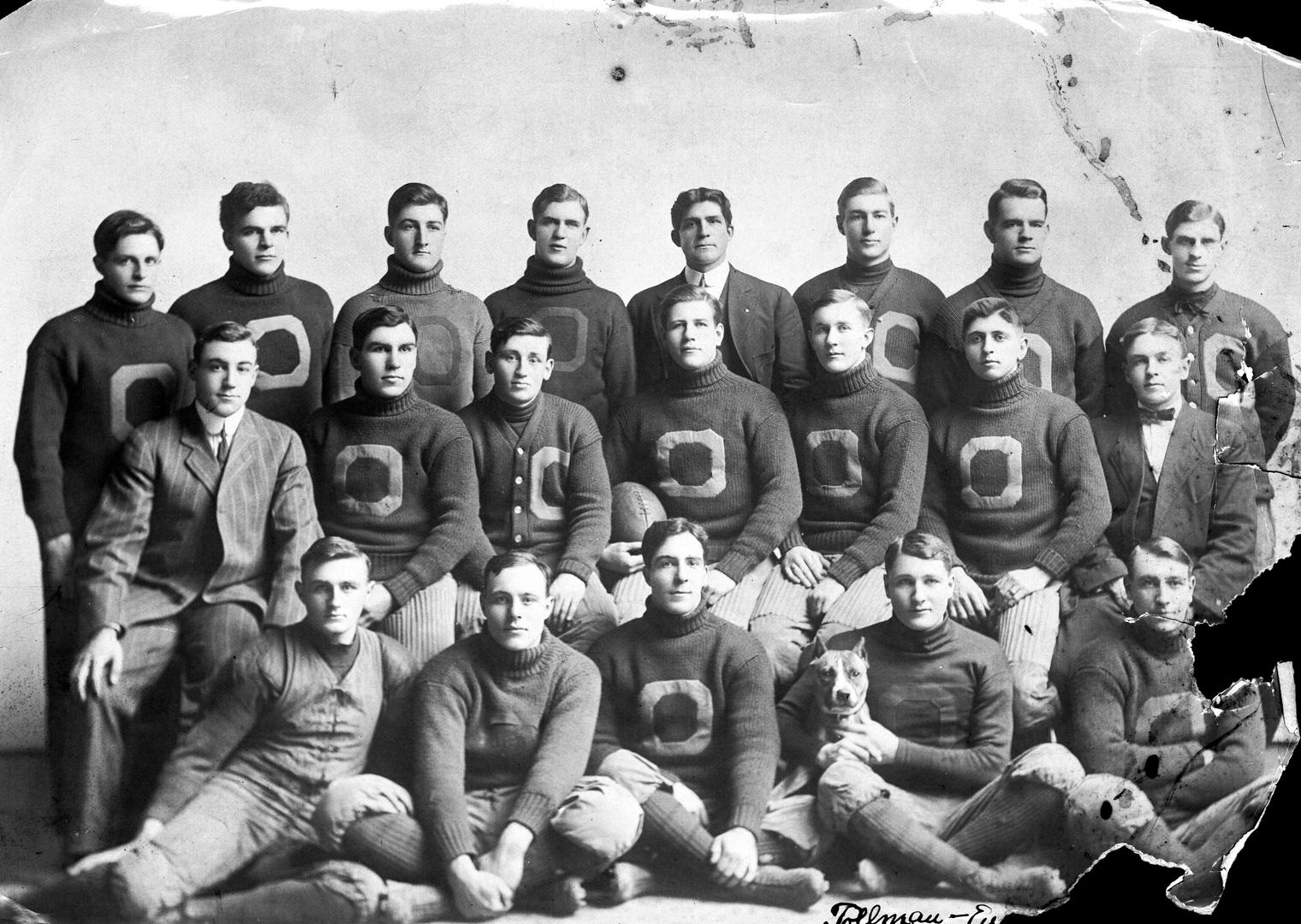
- Conference: Northwest Conference
- Record: 3–2 (2–1 Northwest)
- Head coach: Robert Forbes (2nd season)
- Captain: Dudley Clarke
- Home stadium: Kincaid Field

1909 Northwest Conference football standings
	Conf.					Overall
Team	W		L		T	W		L		T
Washington +	4	–	0	–	0	7	–	0	–	0
Washington State +	2	–	0	–	0	4	–	1	–	0
Oregon	2	–	1	–	0	3	–	2	–	0
Oregon Agricultural	1	–	2	–	0	4	–	2	–	1
Whitman	1	–	3	–	0	4	–	3	–	1
Idaho	0	–	4	–	0	3	–	4	–	0
+ – Conference co-champions

The 1909 Oregon Webfoots football team represented the University of Oregon as a member of the Northwest Conference during the 1909 college football season. Led by Robert Forbes in his second and final season as head coach, the Webfoots compiled an overall record of 3–2 with a mark of 2–1 in conference play, placing third in the Northwest Conference.

== Schedule ==
Date	Opponent	Site	Result	Attendance	Source
October 30	at Willamette*	Salem, OR	W 29–0		
November 6	Multnomah Athletic Club*	Kincaid Field; Eugene, OR	L 0–3		
November 13	vs. Idaho	Multnomah Field; Portland, OR	W 22–6		
November 19	Oregon Agricultural College	Kincaid Field; Eugene, OR (rivalry)	W 12–0		
November 25	at Washington	Denny Field; Seattle, WA (rivalry)	L 6–20	7,000	
*Non-conference game; Source:
