= 1910 Idaho football team =

American college football season

1910 Idaho football
- Conference: Northwest Conference
- Record: 4–2 (2–2 Northwest)
- Head coach: John G. Griffith (6th season)

1910 Northwest Conference football standings
	Conf.					Overall
Team	W		L		T	W		L		T
Washington $	4	–	0	–	0	6	–	0	–	0
Oregon	2	–	0	–	0	4	–	1	–	0
Oregon Agricultural	2	–	2	–	0	3	–	2	–	1
Idaho	2	–	2	–	0	4	–	2	–	0
Washington State	1	–	3	–	0	2	–	3	–	0
Whitman	0	–	4	–	0	2	–	4	–	0
$ – Conference champion

The 1910 Idaho football team represented the University of Idaho as a member of the Northwest Conference during the 1910 college football season. Led sixth-year head coach John G. Griffith, Idaho compiled an overall record of 4–2 with a mark of 2–2 in conference play, placing fourth in the Northwest Conference. Griffith returned after three years at Iowa, his alma mater, where he was head coach in 1909.

== Schedule ==
Date	Opponent	Site	Result	Source
October 8	Lewiston Normal*	Moscow, ID	W 52–0	
October 15	Gonzaga*	Moscow, ID (rivalry)	W 46–6	
October 21	at Washington State	Rogers Field; Pullman, WA (rivalry)	W 9–5	
October 29	Oregon	Moscow, ID	L 0–29	
November 5	at Washington	Denny Field; Seattle, WA	L 0–29	
November 11	at Whitman	Ankeny Field; Walla Walla, WA	W 5–0	
*Non-conference game
