= Herb Singleton =

American football player (born 1952)

Profile
- Position: Quarterback

Personal information
- Born: May 15, 1952 (age 74)
- Listed height: 6 ft 3 in (1.91 m)
- Listed weight: 225 lb (102 kg)

Career information
- High school: Compton High School
- College: University of Oregon
- NFL draft: 1975: undrafted

Career history
- Portland Thunder (1975)*; Seattle Seahawks (1976)*
- * Offseason or practice squad member only

Herb Singleton (born May 15, 1952) is an American former football quarterback.

== College career ==
Singleton started with Compton Junior College playing two years. Singleton threw at least one touchdown in every game he played with Compton. He completed 236 of 522 passes for 3,861 yards and 33 touchdowns.

In 1972, Singleton transferred to University of Texas at El-Paso where he backed up Gary Keithley becoming the first black quarterback in UTEP history. Singleton quit UTEP after two games.

In spring of 1973 Singleton transferred again as a Junior to University of Oregon. In his junior season, he completed 109 of 234 passes for 1,333 yards and 10 touchdowns. This passing performance was the 5th best in Oregon history at the time despite the fact that he didn't become a starter until the 5th game. He was ranked 4th in PAC-8 Passing in 1973 and was named an honorable mention All-Coast by UPI. Against Washington, Singleton completed 16 of 25 passes for 224 yards and 3 touchdowns. The PAC-8 conference council deemed Singleton eligible for his senior year after debate regarding his UTEP tenure for two games.

In an off-season non-football accident, Singleton broke the wrist of his throwing arm which required surgery. The injury ended his college football career.

== World Football league career ==
Following his college eligibility, Herb Singleton signed a contract with the Portland Thunder in 1975. He did not make it through training camp and was cut after the first few workouts.

== NFL career ==
Herb signed a contract with the expansion franchise Seattle Seahawks in 1976 becoming the first black quarterback of the Seahawks. Singleton was again found himself competing with Gary Keithley. Neither made the regular season roster.

== Personal life ==
Herb Singleton is the father of Jon Singleton, an 8th round selection of the Philadelphia Phillies.
