= Mike Jorgensen (American football) =

American football player and radio color commentator

Profile
- Position: Quarterback

Career information
- High school: Ontario High School
- College: Oregon

Career history

Playing
- 1981–1984: Oregon Ducks

football color commentator
- 1989–present: Oregon Ducks

Mike Jorgensen is an American former football quarterback and is currently a radio color commentator for the Oregon Ducks football team.

== Playing career ==
Jorgensen was a star high school quarterback and basketball player at Ontario High School in Ontario, Oregon. He was recruited to play football for the University of Oregon, and earned the starting job at quarterback in the 1983 season after success leading the Ducks at the end of the 1982 season. Toward the end of the 1982 season, Jorgensen broke his leg and was replaced by Chris Miller. He was initially named the starter for the 1984 season, but after struggling in the first game of the season, Miller took over the starting duties.

== Broadcasting career ==
In 1989, Jorgensen became a color commentator for the Ducks football radio broadcasts. He also served as president of an insurance company based in Medford, Oregon.
