= 1909 Oregon Agricultural Aggies football team =

American college football season

1909 Oregon Agricultural Aggies football
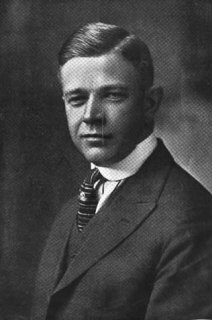
- Conference: Northwest Conference
- Record: 4–2–1 (1–2 Northwest)
- Head coach: Sol Metzger (1st season)
- Captain: James Evenden
- Home stadium: Bell Field

1909 Northwest Conference football standings
	Conf.					Overall
Team	W		L		T	W		L		T
Washington +	4	–	0	–	0	7	–	0	–	0
Washington State +	2	–	0	–	0	4	–	1	–	0
Oregon	2	–	1	–	0	3	–	2	–	0
Oregon Agricultural	1	–	2	–	0	4	–	2	–	1
Whitman	1	–	3	–	0	4	–	3	–	1
Idaho	0	–	4	–	0	3	–	4	–	0
+ – Conference co-champions

The 1909 Oregon Agricultural Aggies football team represented Oregon Agricultural College (OAC)—now known as Oregon State University—as a member of the Northwest Conference during the 1909 college football season. In their first and only season under head coach Sol Metzger, the Aggies compiled an overall record of 4–2–1 record with a mark of 1–2 in conference play, placing fourth in the Northwest Conference, and outscored their opponents by a combined total of 54 to 44. Against major opponents, the Aggies lost to Oregon (12–0) and Washington (18–0). The team played its home games at Bell Field in Corvallis, Oregon. Carl Wolf was the team captain.

== Schedule ==
Date	Opponent	Site	Result	Attendance	Source
October 11	O.A.C. alumni*	Bell Field; Corvallis, OR	T 0–0		
October 16	Pacific (OR)*	Bell Field; Corvallis, OR	W 21–0		
October 23	Catholic YMCA*	Bell Field; Corvallis, OR	W 12–0		
October 29	at Whitman	Walla Walla, WA	W 10–6		
November 13	Washington	Bell Field; Corvallis, OR	L 0–18		
November 19	at Oregon	Kincaid Field; Eugene, OR (rivalry)	L 0–12		
November 25	at Multnomah Athletic Club*	Multnomah Field; Portland, OR	W 11–8		
*Non-conference game
