= Guy Kennedy =

American football coach

Coaching career (HC unless noted)
- 1894: Oregon Oregon Agricultural

Head coaching record
- Overall: 2–1

Guy Kennedy^{[i]} was an American college football coach at Oregon State University, then known as Oregon Agricultural College.

== Collegiate coaching ==
In 1894, Guy Kennedy became the second head coach for Oregon State. He served as the head coach for just one season. He went 2–1 in that season. The most notable win in his three-game season, was against the University of Oregon. OAC prevailed in the first Oregon–Oregon State football rivalry game, 16–0, played at College Field on Lower Campus on the OAC campus.

== Head coaching record ==
Year	Team	Overall	Conference	Standing	Bowl/playoffs
Oregon Agricultural Aggies (Independent) (1894)
1894	Oregon Agricultural	2–1			
Oregon Agricultural:		2–1			
Total:		2–1			

== Notes ==
i. ^ ^{a} This name may be inaccurate. The Oregon State football media guide lists three different names for this coach. "Guy Kenney", "Gary Kennedy", and "Guy Kennedy" are all used. Other sources equally dispute the name.
