= 1895 Oregon Webfoots football team =

American college football season

1895 Oregon Webfoots football
- 1895 U of O football team; coach Percy Benson in lower left

OIFA champions
- Conference: Oregon Intercollegiate Football Association
- Record: 4–0 (4–0 OIFA)
- Head coach: Percy Benson (1st season)
- Captain: H. S. Templeton
- Home stadium: Kincaid Field

The 1895 Oregon Webfoots football team was an American football team that represented the University of Oregon in the 1895 college football season. It was the Webfoots' second season. They were led by head coach Percy Benson, previously a star player for the University of California team.

== Background ==
The Webfoots were part of a five-team conference called the Oregon Intercollegiate Football Association, which met in Salem on October 5, 1895, to elect officers, establish official rules, and set a schedule for the year. Other members of the conference included Oregon Agricultural College in Corvallis, Portland University (a short-lived private school who were collegiate champions of Oregon for 1894), Pacific University in Forest Grove, and Willamette University in Salem.

The team's coach for 1895 was Percy Benson, a star quarterback for the California Golden Bears. Benson's hiring was announced during the last week of September, with his arrival in Eugene from California anticipated towards the first of October.

The first two games of the 1895 season – against OAC and Willamette – were regarded as exhibition practice games, the final two contests being official conference games that were part of the "league series."

They finished the season with a record of four wins and zero losses (4–0), winning the OIFA's pennant.

== Schedule ==
Date	Opponent	Site	Result	Attendance	Source
October 26	Oregon Agricultural	Kincaid Field; Eugene, OR (rivalry)	W 46–0		
November 2	at Willamette	Oregon State Fairgrounds; Salem, OR	W 8–4		
November 16	at Portland University	Portland, OR	W 6–4		
November 28	Willamette University	Kincaid Field; Eugene, OR	W 6–0	1,000	

== Roster ==
Starters

• Left end: J. Russell Coleman
• Left tackle: Fred M. Templeton
• Left guard: John M. Edmunson
• Center: A.L. Gilleland
• Right guard: Edward P. Shattuck
• Right tackle: Fred D. Herbold
• Right end: Lee M. Travis
• Quarterback: Roscoe S. Bryson
• Left halfback: Clarence M. Bishop
• Right halfback: Clarence W. Keene
• Fullback: Harry S. Templeton

Reserves: Lincoln Farrington, A. Kuykendall, Merriman, Miller, Ellis Prather, Stransley; John L. Higgins, Storossli
