= Sol Metzger =

American football player (1880–1932)

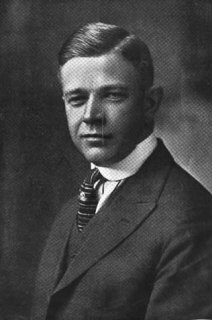
- Metzger, c. 1919

Biographical details
- Born: December 29, 1880; Bedford, Pennsylvania, U.S.
- Died: January 18, 1932 (aged 51); Ventnor City, New Jersey, U.S.

Playing career

Football
- 1901–1903: Penn
- Positions: End, quarterback

Coaching career (HC unless noted)

Football
- 1904: Baylor
- 1908: Penn
- 1909: Oregon Agricultural
- 1914–1915: West Virginia
- 1916–1917: Washington & Jefferson
- 1918: Camp Dix
- 1919: Union (NY)
- 1920–1924: South Carolina

Basketball
- 1920–1921: South Carolina

Administrative career (AD unless noted)
- 1920–1924: South Carolina

Head coaching record
- Overall: 70–43–10 (football); 7–11 (basketball)

Accomplishments and honors

Championships
- Football; 1 national (1908)

Awards
- Third-team All-American (1902)

Sol S. Metzger (December 29, 1880 – January 18, 1932) was an American football player, coach of football and basketball, college athletics administrator, and sports journalist. He served as the head football coach at Baylor University (1904), the University of Pennsylvania (1908), Oregon State University (1909), West Virginia University (1914–1915), Washington & Jefferson College (1916–1917), Union College (1919), the University of South Carolina (1920–1924).

Metzger was also the head basketball coach at South Carolina for one season in 1920–21, tallying a mark of 7–11. In addition, Metzger wrote a nationally syndicated sports column.

== Early life ==
Metzger was born in Bedford, Pennsylvania on December 29, 1880. He was of son of American Civil War veteran Captain Sol Metzger and his wife Margaret (Andrews) Metzger. He was one of six children with three brothers and two sisters. Growing up in Bedford he attended Bedford Public Schools and the Bedford Academy before going to Phillips-Andover Academy in Andover, Massachusetts. He graduated from Phillips-Andover Academy in 1899 where he was a member of the track team as a member of the quarter mile relay team.

== University of Pennsylvania ==
Metzger was a graduate of University of Pennsylvania in 1903 with a Bachelor of Architecture. He was active in many organizations including Phi Kappa Psi fraternity and Sphinx Society. He was also business manager of the University’s monthly periodical, The Red and Blue. At Penn he was also much involved in several athletic programs including being the manager of the varsity rowing team, a member of the track team and most notably the football team.

=== Football player ===
Metzger began his college career as a member of the freshman football team. He lettered three years at end and quarterback on the varsity team. His first varsity year was played under College Football Hall of Fame coach George Washington Woodruff and last two under Carl S. Williams.

In 1901, Metzger first season for the Quakers, he played as a backup. The team started strong by winning their first seven games, but were weakened in part to injuries accumulated during the earlier games. The Quakers lost five out the last eight to finish the season 10–5. The five losses were the most under Woodruff. In addition to the tough season the team had to deal with an undergraduate and dental student revolt upset about the coaching of the team. This led to Head Coach George W. Woodruff to resign as coach. After Woodruff resignation was accepted, the members of the football team sent a letter to the Football Committee unanimously requesting that Woodruff be reinstated as coach. The letter was ignored.

In 1902, Carl Sheldon Williams succeeded George W. Woodruff as coached and the Quakers improved to 9–4. The following year Metzger was named captain and led Penn to a 9–3 mark. During his playing career he was best known for playing right end on Defense where he was known for his tackling and stopping the opposition’s runs around end.

== Coaching career ==
=== Baylor ===
After graduating from Penn, he took a job as coach at Baylor University. He compiled a 2–5–1 record in 1904.

=== Pennsylvania ===
In 1908, Metzger succeeded Carl Williams, his former coach, at the University of Pennsylvania. Penn won a retroactive national title after an 11–0–1 campaign in his only year at the helm of the Quakers. During the championship run, the Quakers out-scored their opponents, 215–18. A 6–6 tie with the Carlisle Indians was only blemish on their season. This team was led by two future members of the College Football Hall of Fame, All-American senior captain Bill "Big Bill" Hollenback at halfback and All-American Hunter Scarlett at end.

=== Oregon State ===
In 1909, Metzger became head coach at Oregon State University (then known as Oregon Agricultural College) where he posted a 4–2–1 record including late season losses to Washington and the Oregon. During the season, Metzger removed the team's captain, Carl Wolff, from the squad for insubordination.

=== West Virginia ===
After spending time raising fruit in Lewiston, Idaho, Metzger coached at West Virginia University from 1914 to 1915, where he and compiled a 10–6–1 record. Metzger replaced Edwin Sweetland to please outraged alumni calling for the hiring of a nationally known coach. During his tenure as coach he was credited with bring in stars such as Ira Errett Rodgers, Russ Bailey and Clay Hite. While at West Virginia he was also noted for being one of the first coaches to employ the screen pass.

In Metzgers first season at West Virginia, the team finished with a 5–4 record. During the season his coaching was hindered when he broke his leg in an automobile accident. The 1915 squad improved to a record of 5–2–1 and gained some national attention. The team scored 216 points to 25 by their opponents. The two losses were a 7–0 loss to traditional power the University of Pennsylvania to start the season, and a forfeit to Washington and Lee. During the Washington & Lee game, Metzger pulled his team off the field alleging rough play while leading 8–6. The only other blemish was a tie to Washington & Jefferson which later defeated traditional power Yale. Metzger was offered the coaching position for the next season but turned it down, instead signing to coach Washington and Jefferson College.

==== Tower play controversy ====
In 1915, Metzger was involved in a controversy with what would become known as a "Tower Play" during a game between West Virginia and Marshall. The Mountaineers were heavily favored and Metzger told the media he would "eat his hat if Marshall scores." As expected, Metzger's team won the game handily by a score of 92–6. West Virginia mostly ran ball to the side line where Blondie Taylor was so to punish him for transferring from WVU to Marshall before the season. To prevent the shutout, Marshall coach Boyd Chambers developed a special play. On their fourth possession. Marshall moved the ball down to the 15-yard line. Marshall back Dayton Carter came in the game. Marshall quarterback Brad Workman, took the snap and set up to pass. Marshall's tackle Okey Taylor and Carter ran toward the end zone. Carter was hoisted onto Taylor's shoulders as Workman rifled a high pass in their direction. Carter caught the ball and fell into the end zone for a score. Metzger argued with the officials, but the referee and umpire could find no rule to discount the score. The next day the Huntington Herald Dispatch head line was “Marshall Scores” The story did not mention much about West Virginia until the middle of the article instead focusing on the Tower play. Metzger protested to former Yale coach Walter Camp, who was in charge of college football rules. Camp upheld the score, however, he changed the rules to not allow the play for the 1916 season.

=== Washington & Jefferson ===
In 1916, Metzger moved Washington & Jefferson College where he coached for two years. During his tenure he coached the Red and Black to a record of 15–5. Metzger replaced Robert Folwell who became coach of the University of Pennsylvania.

The 1916 season Metzger had to contend with injuries and suspensions. Two players (Nuss and Ruble) were injured in a loss to Yale. Before the team left for Richmond, Virginia to play Washington and Lee, three players, Fain, Whitehill and Nall, were declared ineligible due to poor grades. During the victory over Washington and Lee, center Bill Shields fractured ankle and was out for the rest of the season. Before the last game of the season, a victory over Rutgers, Metzger became ill with ptomaine poisoning. Washington and Jefferson was considered one of the youngest and smallest teams in the country, averaging 169 pounds and 20 years of age. Even with the injuries and suspensions, Metzger and the Red and Black finished the season with an 8–2 record, the only losses coming mid season in back-to-back games against Yale and Pittsburgh.

Metzger and the Red and Black went 7–3 in 1917 losing to West Virginia, Pittsburgh, and Notre Dame by a total of 13 points. The team was led by two future college football hall of fame members Wilbur "Pete" Henry, who was named All-American that year and Edgar Garbisch. After the 1917 season, several players enlisted in the military to serve in World War I. There were rumors that the administration was not happy with Metzger's performance, but would allow him to coach the 1918 season. After the season, Metzger tried to enlist in for service in World War I. He was twice refused because of a leg injury he suffered during his tenure as West Virgian head football coach. After those rejections he took a position as an athletic director in the YMCA at Camp Dix where he organized athletic events for the military personnel.

=== Union ===
In 1919, Metzger was named Director of Physical Activities at Union College in Schenectady, New York. In this position he was in charge of coaching the football team as well as developing basketball, baseball and track teams. In developing the athletic program after World War I, Metzger did not have to start from scratch since Union did not abandon its program like other colleges did during the war.

=== South Carolina ===
Metzger's last coaching stop was at the University of South Carolina, where he went 31–20–2.

== Sports author and journalist ==
Even while coaching, Metzger's chief occupation was writing for magazine and newspapers. He focused mainly on sports and outdoor subjects including fishing and hunting. Many times he would illustrate his articles with his own drawings. He contributed articles to such magazines as Outing, Collier's Weekly, and The Saturday Evening Post. He wrote a syndicated column called "Touchdown Secrets" that was published by newspapers throughout the country. In addition he started a syndicate to provide newspapers articles written by himself as well as other journalists.

=== World War I ===
At the beginning of the War many colleges and universities were questioning the value of athletic programs on campus. Metzger wrote a series articles that supported the continuation of athletics at colleges and universities. He argued athletes were more likely to enlist than the general student body. He also indicated that athletic programs help train students for the War effort. He wrote The New York Times that he regarded participating in athletics as a patriotic duty.

=== Books ===
- 1929 Putting Analyzed
- 1931 How To Play Golf co-authored by Grantland Rice and Innis Brown (ISBN 1-4325-9010-3)
- 1931 How To Watch Football

== Family and later life ==
Metzger married Miss Mae Oakley of New York City and the couple had three children: John, Robert. and Joy. After retiring from coaching, Metzger moved to Atlantic City, New Jersey, where he resided the rest of his life. A resident of Ventnor City, New Jersey, he died there on January 18, 1932, of erysipelas developed after surgery.

== Head coaching record ==
=== Football ===
Year	Team	Overall	Conference	Standing	Bowl/playoffs
Baylor (Independent) (1904)
1904	Baylor	2–5–1			
Baylor:		2–5–1			
Penn Quakers (Independent) (1908)
1908	Penn	11–0–1			
Penn:		11–0–1			
Oregon Agricultural Aggies (Northwest Conference) (1909)
1909	Oregon Agricultural	4–2–1	1–2	4th	
Oregon Agricultural:		4–2–1	1–2		
West Virginia Mountaineers (Independent) (1914–1915)
1914	West Virginia	5–4			
1915	West Virginia	5–2–1			
West Virginia:		10–6–1			
Washington & Jefferson Red and Black (Independent) (1916–1917)
1916	Washington & Jefferson	8–2			
1917	Washington & Jefferson	7–3			
Washington & Jefferson:		15–5			
Camp Dix (Independent) (1918)
1918	Camp Dix	1–2–2			
Camp Dix:		1–2–2			
Union Garnet (Independent) (1919)
1919	Union	1–5–2			
Union:		1–5–2			
South Carolina Gamecocks (Southern Intercollegiate Athletic Association) (1920–1921)
1920	South Carolina	5–4	3–1	T–6th	
1921	South Carolina	5–1–2	2–1–1	T–10th	
South Carolina Gamecocks (Southern Conference) (1922–1924)
1922	South Carolina	5–4	0–2	T–18th	
1923	South Carolina	4–6	0–4	T–19th	
1924	South Carolina	7–3	3–2	T–6th	
South Carolina:		26–18–2	8–10–1		
Total:		70–43–10			
National championship Conference title Conference division title or championship game berth
