= 1909 Washington football team =

American college football season

1909 Washington football
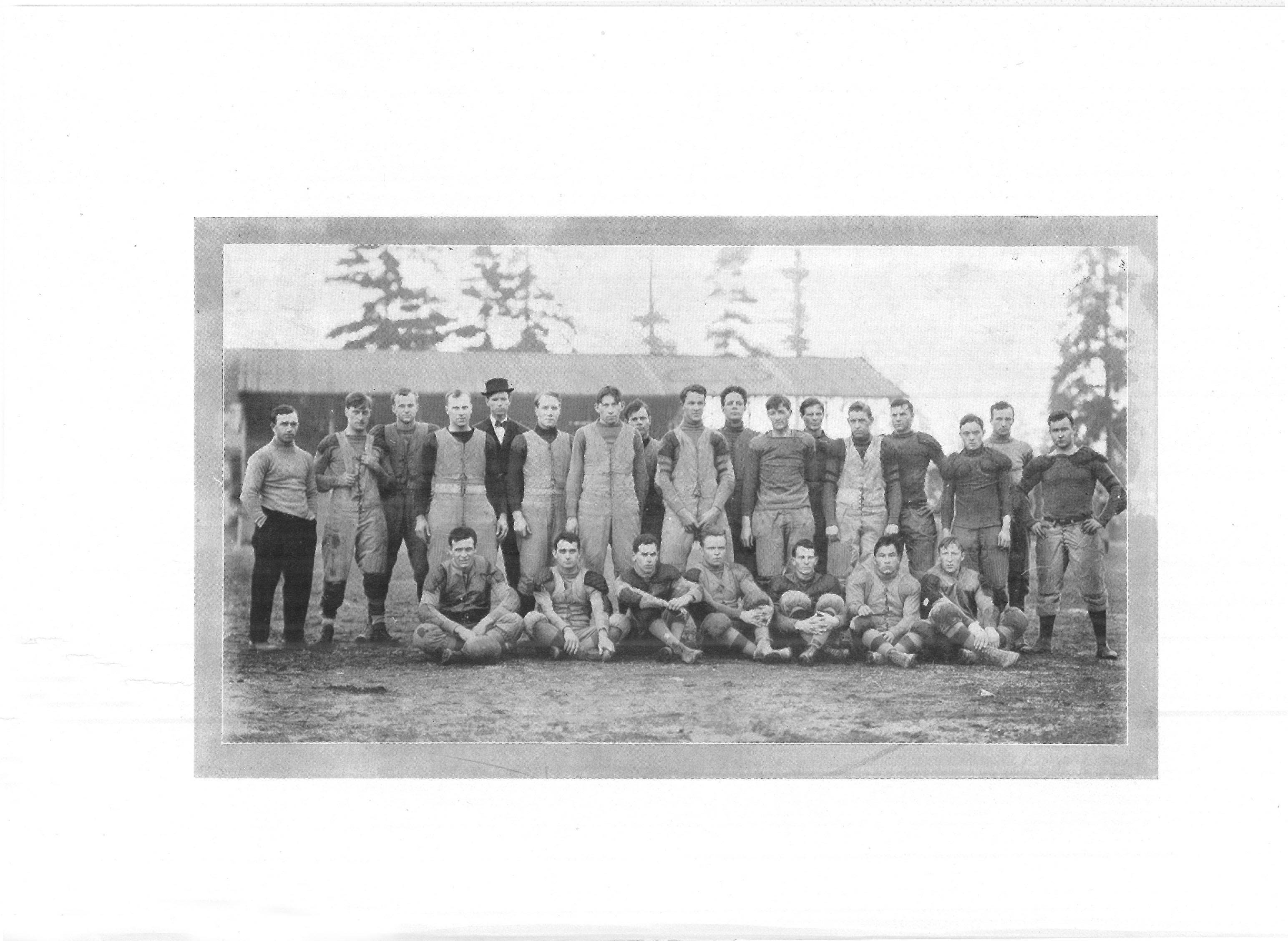

Northwest Conference co-champion
- Conference: Northwest Conference
- Record: 7–0 (4–0 Northwest)
- Head coach: Gil Dobie (2nd season)
- Captain: Melville Mucklestone
- Home stadium: Denny Field

1909 Northwest Conference football standings
	Conf.					Overall
Team	W		L		T	W		L		T
Washington +	4	–	0	–	0	7	–	0	–	0
Washington State +	2	–	0	–	0	4	–	1	–	0
Oregon	2	–	1	–	0	3	–	2	–	0
Oregon Agricultural	1	–	2	–	0	4	–	2	–	1
Whitman	1	–	3	–	0	4	–	3	–	1
Idaho	0	–	4	–	0	3	–	4	–	0
+ – Conference co-champions

The 1909 Washington football team was an American football team that represented the University of Washington as a member of the Northwest Conference during the 1909 college football season. In its second season under coach Gil Dobie, the team compiled an overall record of 7–0 record with a mark of 4–0 in conference play, sharing the Northwest Conference title with Washington State. Washington shut out six of seven opponents, and outscored all opponents by a combined total of 214 to 6. Melville Mucklestone was the team captain.

== Schedule ==
Date	Opponent	Site	Result	Attendance	Source
October 2	USS Milwaukee*	Denny Field; Seattle, WA	W 52–0	1,000	
October 9	Queen Anne High School*	Denny Field; Seattle, WA	W 34–0	1,500	
October 23	Lincoln High School*	Denny Field; Seattle, WA	W 20–0	1,500	
October 30	vs. Idaho	Recreation Park; Spokane, WA	W 50–0	3,000	
November 6	Whitman	Denny Field; Seattle, WA	W 17–0	3,000	
November 13	at Oregon Agricultural	College Field; Corvallis, OR	W 21–0	1,000	
November 25	Oregon	Denny Field; Seattle, WA (rivalry)	W 20–6	7,000	
*Non-conference game; Source:
