= Oregon Intercollegiate Football Association =

- Founded: 1893
- Folded: 1897
- Sports fielded: College football
- No. of teams: 4–7

The Oregon Intercollegiate Football Association (OIFA) was the pioneer governing committee which coordinated games of football between various colleges in the American state of Oregon. The committee agreed upon common rules of play, scheduled games, and provided a framework for an annual champion in the years 1893 and 1897.

The conference was relaunched for the 1899 season but was abruptly scuttled by the withdrawal on November 14 of two league teams over allegations that Willamette University had enrolled "ringers" for the sole purpose of playing football.

== Organizational history ==
=== 1893 season ===
Four teams participated in the OIFA in 1893. Oregon Agricultural College Aggies were crowned champions.

The teams finished the 1893 season with the following records:

Team	Wins	Losses	Ties	Source
Oregon Agricultural College	3	0	0	
Pacific University	2	0	0	
Albany College	0	1	0	
Oregon Normal School	0	4	0	

=== 1894 season ===
There were seven teams participating in the OIFA in 1894. Portland University were crowned champions.

The teams finished the 1894 season with the following records:

Team	Wins	Losses	Ties	Source
Portland University	4	0	0	
Oregon Agricultural College	3	1	0	
Willamette University	2	4	1	
Pacific University	1	2	1	
University of Oregon	1	2	1	
Pacific College	1	3	0	
Oregon Normal School	0	4	0	

=== 1895 season ===
A meeting of college representatives was held in Salem on Saturday, October 5, 1895 to organize a schedule for the coming year. Attending were representatives of Portland University, Oregon Agricultural College, the University of Oregon, Pacific University, and new participant Willamette University. The 1894 season marked the first year of organized football for Willamette and the 1895 campaign would be their second. Oregon Normal School (today's Western Oregon State College) did not participate.

President E. E. Washburne of Portland University was selected as president of the conference by virtue of his school having won the championship in 1894. The conference representatives agreed to accept the Harvard–Pennsylvania–Cornell rules for the 1895–96 season and adopted the Spalding No. J football as the official ball of the league. The University of Oregon Webfoots won their 1st football Conference/League Championship.

The teams finished the 1895 season with the following overall records:

Team	Wins	Losses	Ties	Source
University of Oregon	4	0	0	
Pacific University	1	0	1	
Willamette University	2	2	0	
Portland University	0	1	0	
Oregon Normal School	0	1	0	
Oregon Agricultural College	0	2	1	

=== 1896 season ===
There were seven teams participating in the OIFA in 1896. Willamette University were crowned champions.

The teams finished the 1896 season with the following records:

Team	Wins	Losses	Ties	Source
Willamette University	2	0	1	
Pacific College	2	0	0	
Pacific University	1	0	0	
Oregon Agricultural College	1	2	0	
Portland University	0	0	0	
Oregon Normal School	0	0	0	
McMinnville College	0	3	0	

=== 1897 season ===
There were six teams participating in the OIFA in 1897. Oregon Agricultural College Aggies were crowned champions. They also went on the beat the Oregon Webfoots and Washington Sun-Dodgers and with those two wins, the team proclaimed themselves the "Champions of the Northwest".

The teams finished the 1897 season with the following records:

Team	Wins	Losses	Ties	Source
Oregon Agricultural College	5	0	0	
Pacific College	2	2	0	
McMinnville College	2	2	0	
Pacific University	1	1	0	
Albany College	0	1	0	
Oregon Normal School	0	1	0	

=== 1899 season ===
The OIFA was relaunched for the 1899 football season but was abruptly scuttled midseason by the November 14 withdrawal of two conference members, the University of Oregon and Oregon Agricultural College, behind charges that Willamette University was enrolling "ringers" on its books for the sole purpose of playing football.

A story in the Eugene Guard declared:

"It is said that no less than eight of Willamette's eleven are 'grafters.' 'Spike' Young occupies a fat job in the state house; Ruben Sanders comes up from Chemawa for daily practice; Savage, a Salem blacksmith; two practicing physicians, two asylum employees. These are samples of the 'students' that play under Willamette colors."

From Salem came claims that OAC had developed a case of "cold feet" and that rather than face the "humiliation of defeat" at the hands of a superior Willamette squad the Orangemen had enlisted the University of Oregon to go along with the "juvenile prank" of quitting the association. "The Salem team ... entered the league in good faith, organized a team of the very best material available, employed a competent coach, and has been practicing very assiduously," it was noted — only to face the withdrawal of its two leading in-state competitors. Willamette therefore claimed the pennant of the Oregon Intercollegiate Football Association as champion as its own by default.

The declaration by Oregon and OAC that all agreement between them and the league were consequently "null and void" and a refusal to play further games with Willamette spelled a final end for the OIFA.
