= Kincaid Field =

Athletic field In Oregon, United States

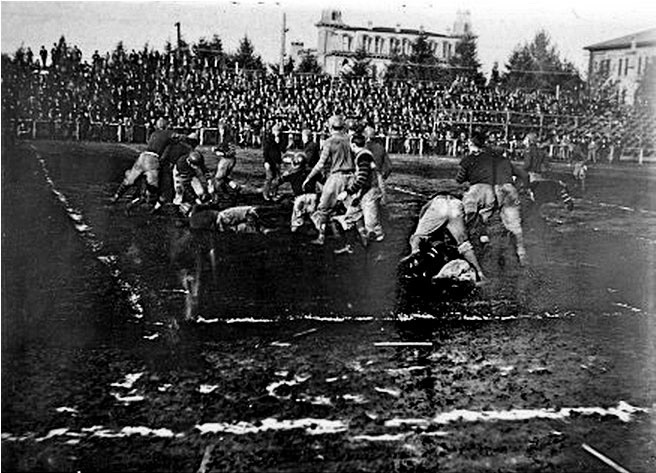
- Football at Kincaid Field in 1907
- Interactive map of Kincaid Field
- Location: East 13th Avenue; Eugene, Oregon, U.S.
- Coordinates: 44.045°N 123.0776°W
- Owner: University of Oregon
- Operator: University of Oregon

Construction
- Opened: c. 1895, 131 years ago
- Closed: 1922

Tenant
- University of Oregon football (NCAA) (c.1895–1918)

Kincaid Field was an athletic field in the located on the campus of the University of Oregon in Eugene, Oregon. The university acquired the property and used it for athletics from c. 1895 until 1922; it was succeeded by Hayward Field for football in 1919.

Kincaid was located on the west side of campus, on what is now the Memorial Quadrangle. The approximate elevation is 420 feet (130 m) above sea level.
