= Portland University =

Former private university in Portland, Oregon

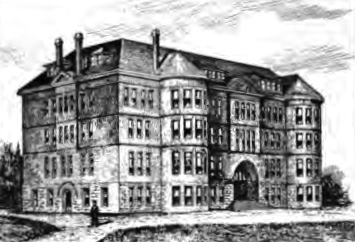
- West Hall
- Type: Private
- Active: 1891–1900
- Affiliations: Methodist
- Location: Portland, Oregon, United States; 45.57182°N 122.72431°W
- Fate: Campus became home to the University of Portland

Portland University was a private, Methodist post-secondary school in Portland, Oregon, United States. Founded in 1891 in a split from Willamette University, the school closed in 1900. The campus was located in what is now the University Park neighborhood and later became home of the University of Portland. The original campus building, West Hall, still stands and is listed on the National Register of Historic Places.

== History ==
Willamette University chancellor Charles Carroll Stratton founded the Methodist school in Portland in 1891. The school lured away some faculty members and students from Willamette, and even enticed Willamette's president Thomas Van Scoy to serve as dean. In 1891, the school built the Administration Hall that became West Hall.

Portland University opened in September 1891 with an enrollment of 256 students the first year. This was the only building on the campus with a nearby general store, Hemstock & Sons, serving as the bookstore.

Courses of study included Latin, science, art, and literature. The school grew to an enrollment of 500 by 1894 and included a literary department, a school of theology, music and fine arts department, and a college preparatory division. This last division had affiliations around the state with academies including Drain Academy, Lebanon Academy, Ashland Academy, and the La Creole Academy in Dallas.

== Geography ==
Located at University Park, the school sold plots of property surrounding the campus to raise funds for the school. They had partnered with the Portland Guarantee Company to sell bonds, using the proceeds from the sale to buy 600 acres (2.4 km^{2}) in what is now North Portland. This venture then deeded 71 acres (290,000 m^{2}) to the school and sold plots for as much as $550.

The location of the campus was on a bluff overlooking the Willamette River, with the river to the west. Much of the area was rural farmland at the time and local homes served as boarding houses for the students. Due to the remoteness, the school offered to have teachers meet new students at the streetcar stop located at University Park for the trek to the school. One impressive home in the area was the university president's home, which was not on campus at the time.

== Decline ==
Following the Panic of 1893, the school suffered a series of financial setbacks. The panic led to decreased enrollment and a severe drop off in the sales of the homesites. Bonds for the venture became due in 1896, but the school was unable to make these payments. Thus the property reverted to the original owners of the property. Internal disputes and these financial problems led the school to leave the campus and hold classes in East Portland in 1896 to 1897 after Van Scoy became president of the institution. Other difficulties included a lawsuit in 1898 against the school's affiliated corporation that sold the plots for the surrounding homes.

By 1898, the school had abandoned the University Park campus. Others who served as president of the university were Arthur J. Brown and George Whitaker (1899). Portland University finally closed in May 1900 with many of students and faculty reuniting with Willamette University in Salem. Alumni of the Portland school were then recognized as alumni of Willamette, and most of the records of the school were transferred to Willamette.

== Legacy ==
In 1901, Rev. Alexander Christie with financing from the Congregation of Holy Cross purchased the former campus and opened a Catholic school at the site that would eventually become Columbia University and is now the University of Portland. He was able to purchase the campus itself in trade for a couple of properties owned by archdiocese in Portland and $1. Land sold by Portland University became the subject of a lawsuit by a subsequent landowner over an easement for a road through the campus. West Hall still stands, but was renamed in 1992 as Waldschmidt Hall. The building was added to the National Register of Historic Places in 1977.

== Notable alumni ==
- John P. Rusk
