= Bolander =

Bolander is a Swedish surname.

== People ==
- Henry Nicholas Bolander (1831–1897), German-American botanist and educator
- Nils Bolander (1902–1959), Swedish hymn writer, theologian, and bishop

== Fictional characters ==
- Stanley Bolander
- Steve Bolander, Ron Howard's character in American Graffiti

== See also ==
- 21852 Bolander, asteroid
- Bolender
- Bolander's phacelia
- Bolander's lily
- Bolander's bluegrass
