= Lane County History Museum =

History museum in Eugene, Oregon, USA

- Established: 1951
- Location: Lane County Fairgrounds, Eugene, Oregon
- Coordinates: 44.0451°N 123.1037°W
- Type: History
- Founder: Cal Young
- Website: lchm.org

Lane County History Museum, located on the county fairgrounds in Lane County in Eugene, Oregon, United States, has ongoing exhibits on the Oregon Trail, the county courthouse, historic vehicles, selections of artifacts from across the county, and photographs. The museum also provides research materials by appointment in their closed stack library, school tours, a variety of public events, and runs an annual grant program for heritage outreach projects. The museum and the Lane County Clerk's Building near the museum entrance are both administered by the Lane County Historical Society.

== Museum collections and archives ==
The museum displays ongoing exhibits using their large collection of historic artifacts; antique vehicles from a buckboard wagon to a 1910 Model-T Ford; and the Lane County Clerk's Building. Exhibits on a variety of topics change bi-annually, featuring up to date research and featuring hundreds of artifacts and images. At present, the museum houses an artifact collection of over 10,000 items related to the history of the county, displayed in changing exhibits on a variety of subjects.

Lane County History Museum also houses an archive featuring a collection of materials about Lane County dating back to 1847, including more than 300,000 photographs depicting residents, industries, and street scenes. The collection also includes manuscripts, maps, newspaper clippings, and academic work related to Lane County. In addition, the museum has continued to display memorable favorites like one of the most complete prairie schooners that crossed the country on the Oregon Trail in 1851, as well as a hemlock section with a carving made in 1867, and the original staircase from the 1898 county courthouse.

== History ==
=== Early days, 1937–1950 ===
Lane County legislator E. O. Potter sponsored a bill approved by the Oregon legislature, authorizing establishment of county history museums. The "Lane County Pioneer Museum and Veterans Memorial Commission" was established in 1935, with Cal Young, known as "Mr. Lane County", as chair. Young had led Lane County's "Oregon Trail Pageant" since 1926, with historical costumes, ox teams, and covered wagons on parade annually. He had also collected a number of artifacts at his farm from pioneer days of the previous century, including a prairie schooner.

By 1937, F. L. Chambers and E. G. Boehnke arranged a property trade with the federal government—land for a new post office site, in exchange for the old post office building to house the county's history museum. Pioneer relics were stored in the basement of the old post office, but other federal agencies needed offices during the war years, so the space was never used as a museum. In 1951, the first Lane County History Museum, described as "a small warehouse museum", 40 by 60 feet (12 m × 18 m), was built at the Lane County Fairgrounds to house the growing collection of pioneer relics. By 1954, to display big logging wheels, the museum added a shed, 25 by 80 feet (7.6 m × 24.4 m) and a covered passage 20 by 140 feet (6.1 m × 42.7 m) for other vehicles. In 1957 the oldest building in Lane County, the Lane County Clerk's Building was moved to the site.

Cal Young became the caretaker for the first few years; when he announced, "I'm getting too old for this museum business", Mrs. E. E. Foss was named the first curator of the museum.

=== 1950–1999 ===
By the early 1950s, the Lane County Pioneer Society was established to support the museum's development.

To compensate for budget cuts due to a recession in the early 1980s, Friends of the Lane County Historical Museum formed in 1984 as a non-profit organization to keep the museum alive. By 1985, funding (and staffing) had been partially restored. By 1987, county officials had considered funding a $30,000 study on whether to build a "Forest Heritage Center" that would incorporate the museum's collection with exhibits on forestry management, logging, and milling. The estimated cost of such a center was $3-to-$4 million; neither the study nor the center was funded. Four years later, even as the museum was characterized by a local reporter as "perennially short of operating revenues and staff", the county administrator proposed cutting a third of the museum's $170,000 operating budget. Intense lobbying of the county's budget committee resulted in partial restoration of the museum's budget, with the provision that "the organization come up with a plan to wean the museum from the general fund". Museum supporters advocated use of the county's car rental tax and room tax funds to restore the museum's funding.

By 1996, Lane County contracted with the newly formed Lane County Historical Society (LCHS) to manage the museum, subsidized by part of the county's Transient Room Tax designated for tourism promotion.

=== 2000–present ===
In 2003, Lane County Historical Society board hired director, Bob Hart, with plans to focus on enlarging the facility and updating the exhibits. In March 2006, the merger of the Lane County Historical Society with the Friends of the Lane County Historical Society was finalized.

Under Hart's direction, the museum has displayed exhibits on a broad range of modern history topics, such as the history of local law enforcement, "Tie Dye & Tofu", "Weird and Wonderful", wine, medical history, logging, contemporary Native American culture, and most recently toys. The museum has also developed interactive outreach presentations such as a "Hands-on U.S. History Traveling Trunk" targeting school children in grades four through twelve, "McKenzie River Stories", which invited guests to record their own stories about the county's main water source, and special events where Director Bob Hart played historical figures Thomas Condon or Joseph Meek.

The museum began digitizing its collection of 300,000 historic photos in 2009, making them available online. A special selection of curated images is also available for browsing.

The museum's subsidy was reduced in 2008 to allow greater county support for Lane County Parks, and was reduced again in 2010, from over $210,000 annually to just over $182,000. In 2012, additional budget cuts required layoffs of three museum employees, whose work Hart said would be covered by recruiting ten additional volunteers. Even with the continuing budget cuts, the museum staff has formed collaborations and extended help to other local museums, and the LCHS and museum were awarded a stewardship certificate for loaning a part-time curator to the Springfield Museum.

LCHS has as yet been unsuccessful in its quest to either enlarge the current quarters of the museum or to relocate it in another facility. When the downtown Eugene Post Office became available in 2010, Hart not only supported its preservation, he reminded the county of the historic claim the Lane County Historic Museum had on the previous post office property. Use of the vacant Post Office building for a new museum was eventually supported by Mayor Kitty Piercy in her state of the city address in 2013. The museum is currently undergoing a number of updates, including exterior renovations and complete exhibit overhauls in their present building.

== See also ==
- Oregon Historical Society Museum
