= Bishop Scott Academy =

School in Portland, Oregon, United States

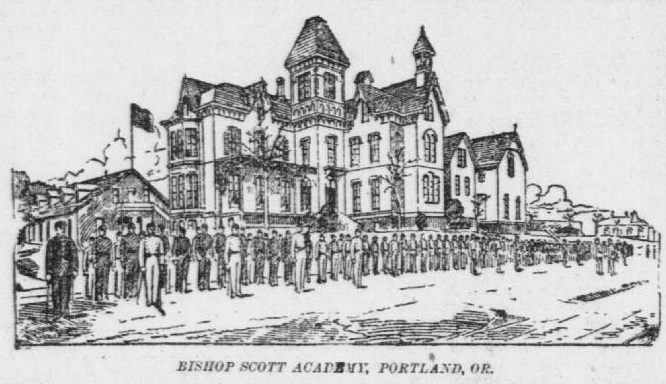
- Second building, as depicted on 1 January 1895
- Type: Defunct as of 1904
- Established: 1870
- Location: Portland, Oregon, United States

Bishop Scott Academy was a school located in Portland in the U.S. state of Oregon. Affiliated with the Episcopal Church, the school was named for the Bishop Thomas Fielding Scott. The school opened in 1870 to educate young men in good citizenship and prepare them to enter the ministry. Later a military department was added to the school before the academy closed in 1904. The school organized the first American football team and held the first football game in the Pacific Northwest in 1889.

== Prior schools ==
=== Trinity School for Boys ===
The academy was related to an earlier attempt by Scott to found a diocesan school. The Reverend William Richmond had started a school at Yamhill in 1852. Bishop Scott moved Richmond's school to present-day Lake Oswego, Oregon, where Scott had purchased 70 acres that included a school building dating to 1850. Here Scott established the Diocesan School for Boys. Bernard Cornelius, a graduate of Trinity College, Dublin, was appointed in 1856 by Scott as principal over 17 boarders. A primary department opened in 1858, and the school was renamed Trinity School for Boys. The school offered "both religious and secular education". Cornelius resigned in 1860, and the school closed for two years. In 1862 it reopened under leadership of the Reverend Michael Fackler. Although Cornelius returned to the reigns in 1863, he could not halt declining enrollment. Trinity school closed in 1866 and the trustees sold the property.

Funds and property were provided to Scott's successor, Bishop B. Wistar Morris, to establish another school, but located in Portland, Oregon. The land comprised 38 city lots along 19th Street, between Couch and Everett Streets in Portland. The donors were Captain George H. Flanders and his sister, Mrs. Caroline Couch (wife of John H. Couch). Morris laid the cornerstone on July 5, 1870.

=== Bishop Scott Grammar and Divinity School ===
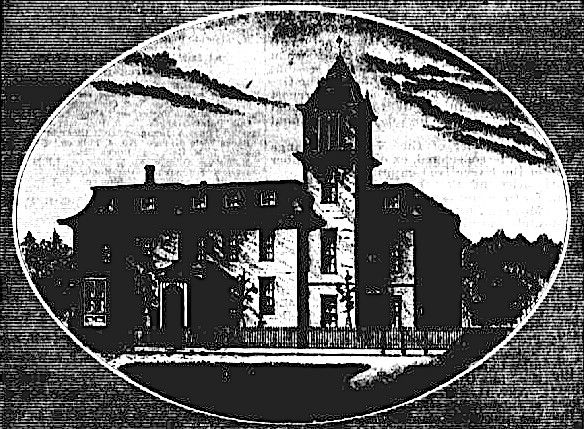
The Bishop Scott Grammar School in 1874

The newly completed Bishop Scott Grammar and Divinity School opened as a boarding and day-school for boys on September 6, 1870, under principal Charles H. Allen. Comprising three storeys above a basement, the building housed 2 classrooms, recitation rooms, a parlour, library, 16 rooms for boarders, a suite for the principal and his family, and its own chapel, called Saint Timothy's. Although the total costs amounted to $15,000, no debt remained.

A year after opening the school had a new head master: Professor R. W. Laing, M.A., L.L.D., assisted by the Reverend George Burton.

By 1873 the property was valued at $30,000, after the addition of the chapel, school rooms, and the dormitory. Costs were defrayed from tuition fees of $150 per annum, and interest from an $7,000 endowment—the proceeds from the sale of the Oswego property. Eighty pupils attended school, thirteen down from the previous year, drawn from Oregon, Washington, California, Utah, Alaska, and British Columbia. The faculty comprised three teachers: Junior Master, William M. Barker; Primary Master, Mr. Grant; and Senior Master, Rev. A. N. Wrixon. As chaplain, Burton conducted services "in the large schoolroom of the Grammar School" at 10.30am, and Sunday School at 2pm in August.

At the start of Christmas Term on 1 September, Rev. Burton, now rector of Trinity Parish, was ensconced as head master. As it had been since 1870, the school was still administered directly by Bishop Morris. Subjects included modern languages, music, singing, drawing, chemistry, and penmanship. Oregon's superintendent of education found that the grammar school's "philosophical and chemical apparatus [were] unsurpassed in the State", and mentioned that the school library contained 1,500 books.

The school had replaced almost all its faculty by 1874, and added women to the staff for the first time. Laing and Barker continued, alongside the new head master and chaplain, Rev. D'Estaing Jennings, M.A. Miss I. A. Buss was added as "Preceptress" (female teacher), and Matron Maria Emery had been appointed. A military tone was introduced, in the form of Drill Master R. R. Anderson and the organization of the Bishop Scott Cadets. Drilling was viewed not only in terms of military preparedness, but as a form of exercise.

On 8 November 1877 the grammar school was heavily damaged by fire. Before fire almost destroyed the library and equipment, the enrollment stood at 43 day pupils and 40 boarders.

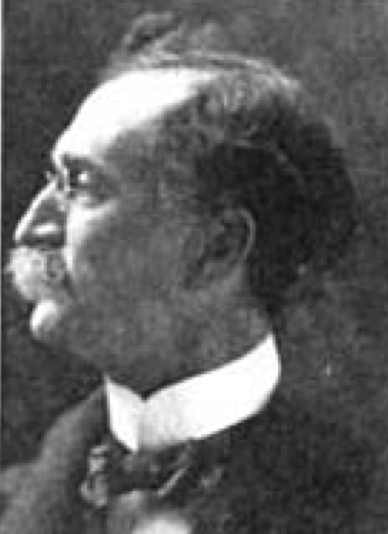
Joseph Wood Hill (b. 1856), in ca. 1905.

Joseph Wood Hill was the new principal when the rebuilt school opened on the same premises in September 1878. Burton had been deposed by Bishop Morris in May that year. The new building was smaller than the one it replaced, although "admirable" and "of superior architectural character", to fit in with the homes in the surrounding area.

Hill was a native of Westport, Connecticut, having attained a BA from Yale University earlier in 1878. He had responded to an address that Bishop Scott gave to a class at Yale. Noah Porter, Yale's president, recommended Hill for his character, teaching experience, and maturity. After his appointment, Hill studied medicine at Willamette University's College of Medicine in Portland, graduating as an MD in 1881. At college he rowed, and became a member of the Gamma Nu fraternity.

Only five boarding pupils attended the school at the start, and there were "less than twenty pupils, all told". Hill leased the school building from the bishop, and later from the board of trustees that had been appointed when Oregon became a separate diocese in 1889.

Echoing the beliefs of Bishop Scott in the value of private over public education, Hill modelled the school after the private boarding schools on the east coast, like the one that he himself had attended. He filled the initial faculty vacancies with Yale graduates, such as John W. Gavin and English teacher Allan Elsworth. At the same time he did subsidize from his own pocket those students for whom the $300 annual fees were a hardship.

Hill spent his vacations visiting exemplary private schools throughout the United States, and gradually became convinced that military discipline was essential for the Academy. In 1886, he declared that pupils should wear uniforms.

Illustrating the amount of control the principal was granted by Bishop Morris, Hill renamed the school the Bishop Scott Academy in 1887. A military department was added, and the Academy became the first school on the West Coast to adopt military discipline. Hill had an armory built that measured 5,000 square feet—"the largest indoor space in Portland" for some time. Although intended as a drill hall, the armory was also used for dances, which Hill believed would provide cadets with a graceful posture.

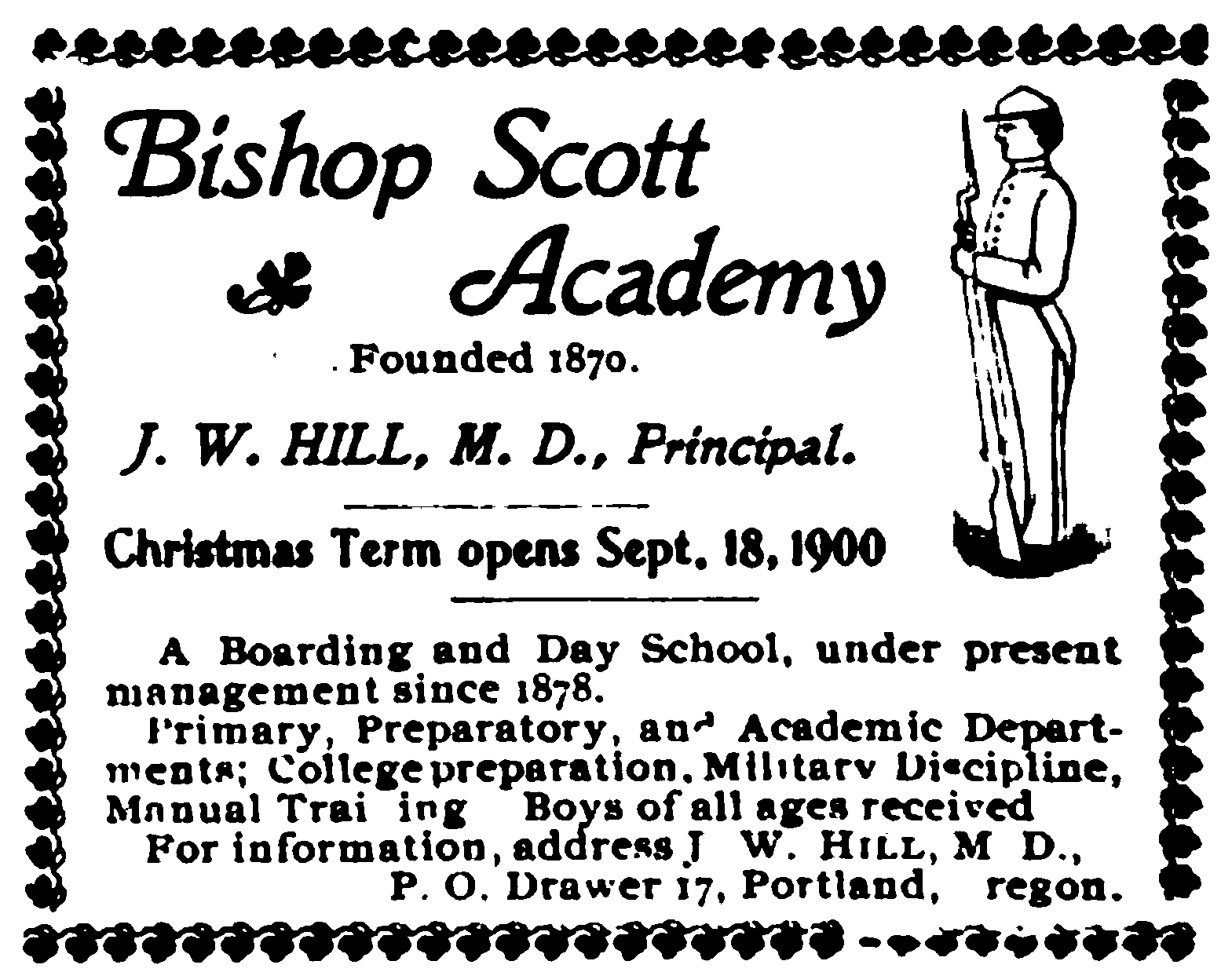
A 1900 newspaper advertisement for the Academy

In order to promote military training, the federal government loaned weapons to schools which employed a qualified officer as military commandant. Hill appointed Lieutenant Colonel F. E. Patterson in 1887 as instructor in mathematics and military tactics. Consequently, the steamship Oregon brought Springfield rifles and "two 3-inch rifled field pieces and carriages" in 1890 to the Academy "from the Benicia arsenal, California". Academy cadets could now learn how to use light artillery.

In 1891 the Academy became the first school permitted to sit Yale University's entrance examinations without direct supervision of Yale faculty. The uniforms for the intake of 234 students that year were supplied by Thomas Kay Woolen Mills' store in Salem.

Gavin organized the first football team in the Northwest at the Academy, which held the first football game in the Northwest in 1889. Gavin had learned to play while studying at Yale. Until that time, rugby union had been the preferred form of football at the school.

Like many institutions across the United States, the school was badly affected by the economic depression that followed the Panic of 1893. Hill recalled that he had 70 pupils by June 1893; but in September only 12 returned when the school re-opened. The principal's own financial state also suffered due to the Panic, his investment in real estate, and the general contraction of the Oregon economy. Hill tried to deflect the impact by assigning the lease of the school to the diocesan secretary, thus placing the Academy out of the reach of his debtors. He also transferred some of his properties to his wife.

Desiring to further formalize the military aspect of the Academy, Hill asked for a serving officer to be assigned. Accordingly, the federal War Department appointed Captain W. A. Kimball in 1895. The United States Army now in effect controlled the Academy's military section. When the Spanish–American War broke out, 30 alumni from the Academy served, fourteen as commissioned officers.

The school also became the first in the Pacific Northwest to implement the Sloyd system of instruction, with Hill personally contributing financially to the purchasing in 1895 of the required equipment.

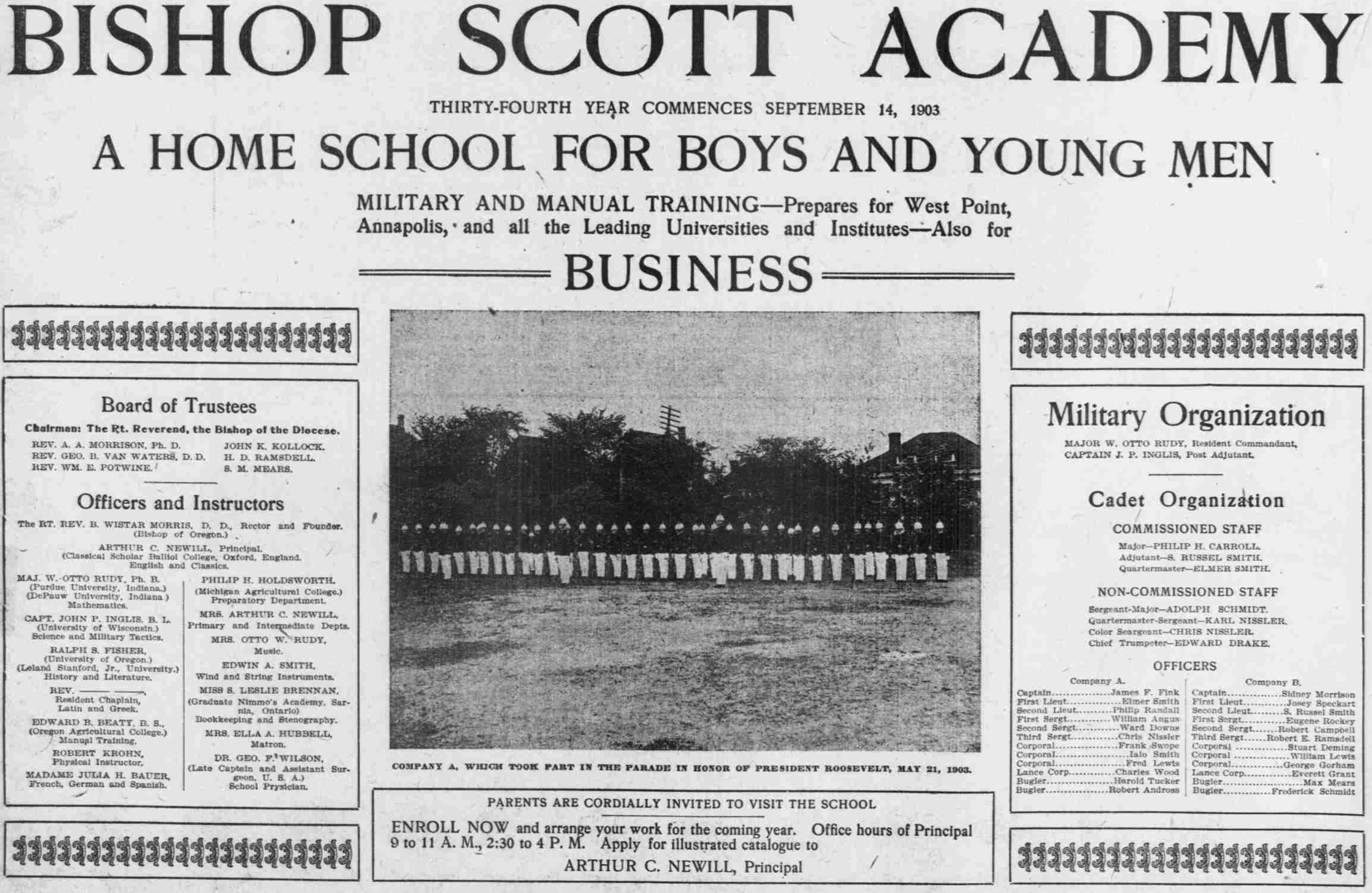
1903 advertisement for Bishop Scott Academy

After 23 years of service, Hill retired in 1901 after a disagreement with the school's board of trustees. Some of the trustees had argued that the diocese should operate the school. They said that the diocese had acted outside its legal limits in granting a lease to Hill. Not wishing to become an employee of the diocese, Hill departed on amiable terms. His first wife, Jessie K. Adams, died in 1901. Hill married Laura E. MacEwan, the widow of the Academy's chaplain, that same year. Originally a Democrat, Hill shifted allegiance to the Republican party in 1896, due to his support for the gold standard. A Freemason, Hill obtained the Knights Templar degree of the York Rite. He started the Hill Military Academy elsewhere in the city, and later became an agent for President William Howard Taft.

Arthur C. Newill, who had read classics at Balliol College, Oxford, was appointed as Hill's successor. The Academy's enrollment declined after having reached 234 in 1901, and under financial pressure the Diocese closed the school in 1904.

Subsequently, several unsuccessful attempts were made to revive the Academy in Yamhill County, Oregon. For example, in June 1913 The Ontario Argus announced that "the Bishop Scott Grammar School for Boys" would reopen in September, north of Yamhill.

== Faculty, 1870-1904 ==
- Right Rev. B. Wistar Morris, D.D. - Rector, 1870-1904
- Dr. J. W. Hill, B.A., M.D. - Principal, Mathematics and English, 1878-1901
- Samuel W. Scott, B.A. (Yale) - Head Master, 1888, 1889, 1890; Classical Languages, Bookkeeping, 1886; Mathematics, 1897
- John W. Gavin, B.A. (Yale), - Classical Languages, 1886, 1890; Head Master, 1892, 1894, 1898
- Colonel James Jackson (1833–1916), United States Army Medal of Honor winner - Military Science and Tactics, 1898-1900
- Captain William A. Kimball (U.S. Army) - Military Science and Tactics
- Colonel F. E. Patterson, O.N.G. - Commandant, Mathematics and Military Tactics, 1886, 1888, 1890, 1892
- Captain Joseph A. Sladen, M.A. (U.S. Army) - Professor of Military Science, 1886, 1888, 1890, 1892
- Captain G. C. von Egloffstein (German Military Academy) - Resident Commandant, Modern Languages, 1888-98
- Harry C. Briggs - Resident Commandant, 1896
- Rev. W. L. MacEwan - Resident Chaplain, 1886-1901
- Mrs. Inez Martin - Matron, 1898
- Rev. John E. Simpson - Resident Chaplain, 1897-98
- Dr. George F. Wilson (Late Capt. & Asst. Surgeon, U.S.A) - School Physician, 1886-94
- Mrs. E. F. Berger, Preparatory Department, 1886, 1888, 1890
- Mrs. S. M. Buck, Primary Department, 1886, 1888
- Miss Jeanne Blodgett, Elocution, 1886, 1888, 1890
- Dr. Henry N. Bolander, Modern Languages, 1883-98
- Mrs. I. L. Crosby - Shorthand and Typewriting, 1896-1898
- Allan M. Ellsworth, B.A. (Yale), 1886, 1890, 1894, Latin, Science; vice-principal, 1892, 1894
- Harold B. Fiske, B. S. A. - Geography, Arithmetic, 1892
- E. Grenier - French, 1892
- George G Guernsey, B. A. (Yale) - Mathematics, Science, History, 1886
- Nielson Hagerup (Christiana Art School, Norway) (b. 1864-d.1922) - artist, Drawing and Painting, 1886, 1888, 1890, 1892
- Sara D. Harker - Primary Department, 1896-1898
- Mrs. J. W. Hill - Preparatory Department, 1896-1898; Primary Department, 1894
- Walter A Holt - Assistants Academic Department, 1886, 1888, 1890
- Hopkins Jenkins - Assistant: English and Mathematics, 1896
- E. Neele Johnston - Assistant: English and Mathematics, 1896
- Mrs. L. E. MacEwan - Music, 1894, 1898
- William A. Montgomery, B. A. (Wesleyan) - English and Elocution, 1892
- Miss H. Z. Sampson, Shorthand and Typing, 1886, 1890, 1892, 1894
- W. S. James - Penmanship, 1886
- Eugene L. Schaefer, M.A. (Moravian College) - Physical Science, Mathematics, Mechanical Drawing, 1892, 1894 1898
- G. M. Schuck - Music, 1886
- Jason Smith - Assistant: English, 1886
- Eugene Stebinger (Stuttgart Conservatory) - Piano, 1886, 1888, 1890, 1892
- Joseph Stebinger (Stuttgart Conservatory) - Violin, 1886, 1888, 1890, 1892
- E. F. Thayer (Rochester), Commercial Department and Pemanship, 1886, 1888, 1890, 1892, 1894
- E. Thibeau, Modern Languages, 1886, 1890
- James White, B.A. (Toronto), 1886, 1888, 1890, 1892
- Miss Katherine Wilson - Dancing, Deportment, 1892, 1894

Note: Incomplete list; dates refer to when individuals are mentioned in biennial reports of the Superintendent of Public Instruction of the State of Oregon.

== Alumni ==
- Harold Benjamin Fiske (1871-1960), U.S. Army Major general
- Franklin F. Korell (1889-1965), politician
- Clifton N. McArthur (1879-1923), politician
- Benjamin Wistar Morris III (1870–1944), architect
- Adolph D. Schmidt (1886-1947), brewer, hotelier
- Loyal B. Stearns (1853-1936), politician
- Walter L. Tooze (1887-1956), politician
- Frederick Eugene Trotter (1873-1939), physician
- Cal Young (1871-1959), first head coach of the Oregon Ducks football team, student from ca. 1886-1891 and teacher (2 yrs., incl. 1892) at the school
