= Bolender =

Bolender is a German variant of the Swedish language surname Bolander.

Notable people with the surname include :

- Bernard Bolender (1952–1995), American mass murderer
- Bill Bolender (born 1940), American actor
- John Bolender (1837–1902), American farmer and politician
- Kurt Bolender (1912–1966), German Nazi SS officer and Holocaust perpetrator
- Todd Bolender (1914–2006), American ballet dancer and choreographer
