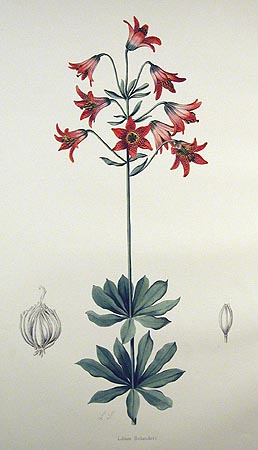
- 1877 illustration

Scientific classification
- Kingdom: Plantae
- Clade: Tracheophytes
- Clade: Angiosperms
- Clade: Monocots
- Order: Liliales
- Family: Liliaceae
- Subfamily: Lilioideae
- Tribe: Lilieae
- Genus: Lilium
- Species: L. bolanderi

Binomial name
- Lilium bolanderi S.Watson

Synonyms
- Lilium howellii I.M.Johnst.

= Lilium bolanderi =

Species of lily

Lilium bolanderi is a rare North American species of plants in the lily family, known by the common name Bolander's lily. It is native to northwestern California (Del Norte, Humboldt, & Siskiyou Counties) and southwestern Oregon (Curry + Josephine Counties).

Lilium bolanderi is a perennial herb growing a waxy, erect stem that approaches a meter in height. It originates from a scaly, elongated bulb up to about 7 centimeters long. The wavy oval leaves are located in several whorls about the stem, each waxy green and up to 7 centimeters in length. The inflorescence bears up to 9 large, nodding lily flowers. The flower is bell-shaped with 6 red tepals up to 5 centimeters long and marked with yellow, purple, or darker reds. It often hybridizes with other lilies, producing a variety of forms, colors and patterns. There are 6 stamens with anthers sometimes nearly a centimeter long and a pistil which may be 4 centimeters in length. The flowers are pollinated by Allen's and rufous hummingbirds, Selasphorus sasin and rufus, respectively.

The lily was named after the California botanist Henry Nicholas Bolander.
