= Cal Young =

American football coach

Biographical details
- Born: June 25, 1871; Eugene, Oregon, U.S.
- Died: January 30, 1957 (aged 85); Eugene, Oregon, U.S.

Coaching career (HC unless noted)
- 1893–1894: Oregon

Head coaching record
- Overall: 1–0

Cal Marcellus Young (June 25, 1871 – January 30, 1957), sometimes known as "Mr. Eugene," or "Mr. Lane County," was an American college football coach and a pioneer of Eugene, Oregon. He was the first head football coach at the University of Oregon.

== Early years ==
Young's parents, Charles Walker Young and Mary B. W. (Gillespie) Young, were pioneers of Eugene, Oregon, having settled there in 1852. Young was born in a log cabin on his father's donation land claim in 1871. He attended Bishop Scott Academy (later known as the Hill Military School) in Portland, Oregon. He was a student there from the age of 15 for five years, and was a teacher at the school for two years. For six years, Young owned a meat market in Eugene. He also worked in the Blue River mines for a year and a half, and as the manager of the Heilig Theatre in Eugene, Oregon from 1903 to 1905.

== Oregon football ==
In 1893, Young helped organize the first football team at the University of Oregon. He had played football in Portland and was hired to coach the team. After a series of inter-squad games, the team played its first game on March 24, 1894, against Albany Collegiate Institute—now known as Lewis & Clark College. Young's Oregon squad won the game by a score of 44–2.

== Later years ==
Young returned to his father's homestead in the early 1900s. He operated a farm, which included a flock of sheep, on the property. He also produced hay, grain and beef.

Young was an avid collector of "pioneer relics" and one of the organizers and leaders of "The Oregon Trail Pageant," an annual pioneer pageant in Eugene that began in 1926. His 1840s "prairie schooner" was a fixture in the area's pioneer parades. He also served as the first caretaker and a board member of the Lane County Pioneer Museum.

Young served as a county commissioner for eight years from 1932 to 1940. In 1936, he was acquitted of charges that he violated corrupt practices laws by allegedly spending more money than permitted in his reelection campaign and "intimidation and coercion for political purposes." In 1940, he was named Eugene's "First Citizen."

Young married Lizzie Comstock in 1891. She died one year later. They had one daughter together, LaVelle Young (m. Gilbert). He remarried in 1913 to Grace Ford. With Grace Ford Young he had a son, Walker Ford ("Ford") Young, and a second daughter, Brandon Young (m. Southworth). Ford Young went on to be a "pioneer" of sorts himself, ultimately settling and living with his wife, Carolyn Musch Young, in British Honduras, which upon its independence became Belize, Central America.

Cal Young suffered a stroke in January 1957. He died a few days after the stroke. He was buried in Gillespie Cemetery located near the family homestead.

== Legacy ==
In February 1958, a portrait of Young dressed in "pioneer garb," carved out of madrona wood, was installed at the Lane County Pioneer Museum. The piece was carved in 1936 by Art Clough and was designated as the Eugene Pioneer Kiwanis Inter-Club Trophy.

In 1976, Young's homestead was designated as a historic district. In 1979, plans were made to subdivide the homestead. The property was eventually subdivided, and as of 1980, all that remained was Young's farmhouse built in 1914 and a milkhouse built in 1874. The historic site, located at 950 Cal Young Road, was reduced to 1-3/4 acres out of what had since 1918 been a 268-acre site. Eugene also has a road, a junior high school, and a neighborhood association named for Young.

== Head coaching record ==
Year	Team	Overall	Conference	Standing	Bowl/playoffs
Oregon Webfoots (Independent) (single–1893–94)
1893–94	Oregon	1–0			
Oregon:		1–0			
Total:		1–0			
