= 1893–94 Oregon football team =

American college football season

1893–94 Oregon Webfoots football
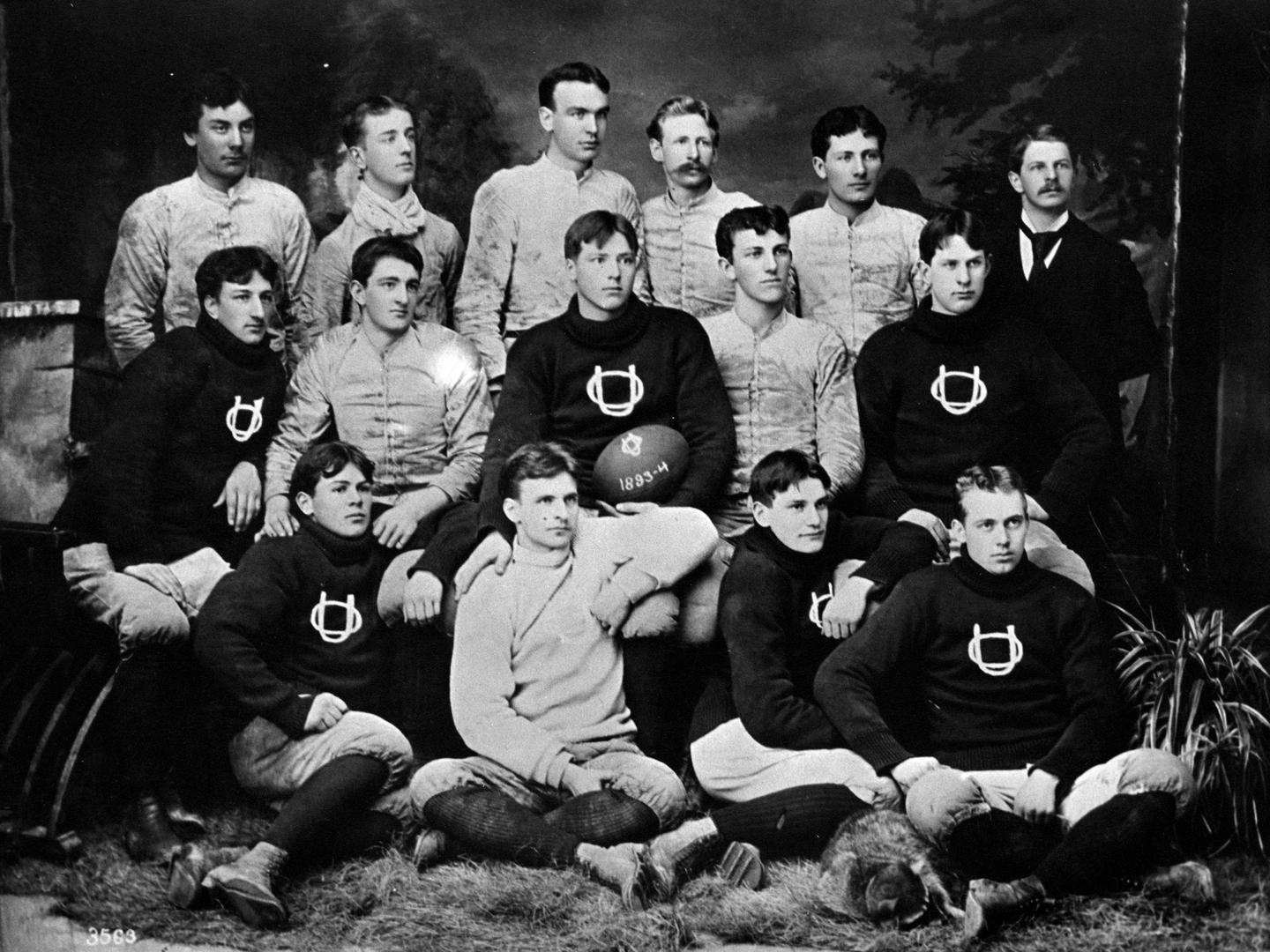
- 1893–94 University of Oregon football team
- Conference: Independent
- Record: 1–0
- Head coach: Cal Young (1st season)
- Captain: Frank Matthews

The 1893–94 Oregon football team represented the University of Oregon in the winter and spring following the 1893 college football season. In the Oregon football teams's first season, they played a single game, a 44–2 win vs. Albany College.

Students from the University of Oregon attended the game between Stanford and Multnomah on New Year's Day, 1894, at Multnomah Field in Portland. After the game they determined to field a team for the university. Unwilling to wait until the 1894 season in the fall, the students set about practicing in the winter and scheduled a game vs. Albany College.

== Schedule ==
| Date | Time | Opponent | Site | Result | Source |
|---|---|---|---|---|---|
| March 24 | 3:00 p.m | Albany College (OR) | Eugene, OR | W 44–2 | |
