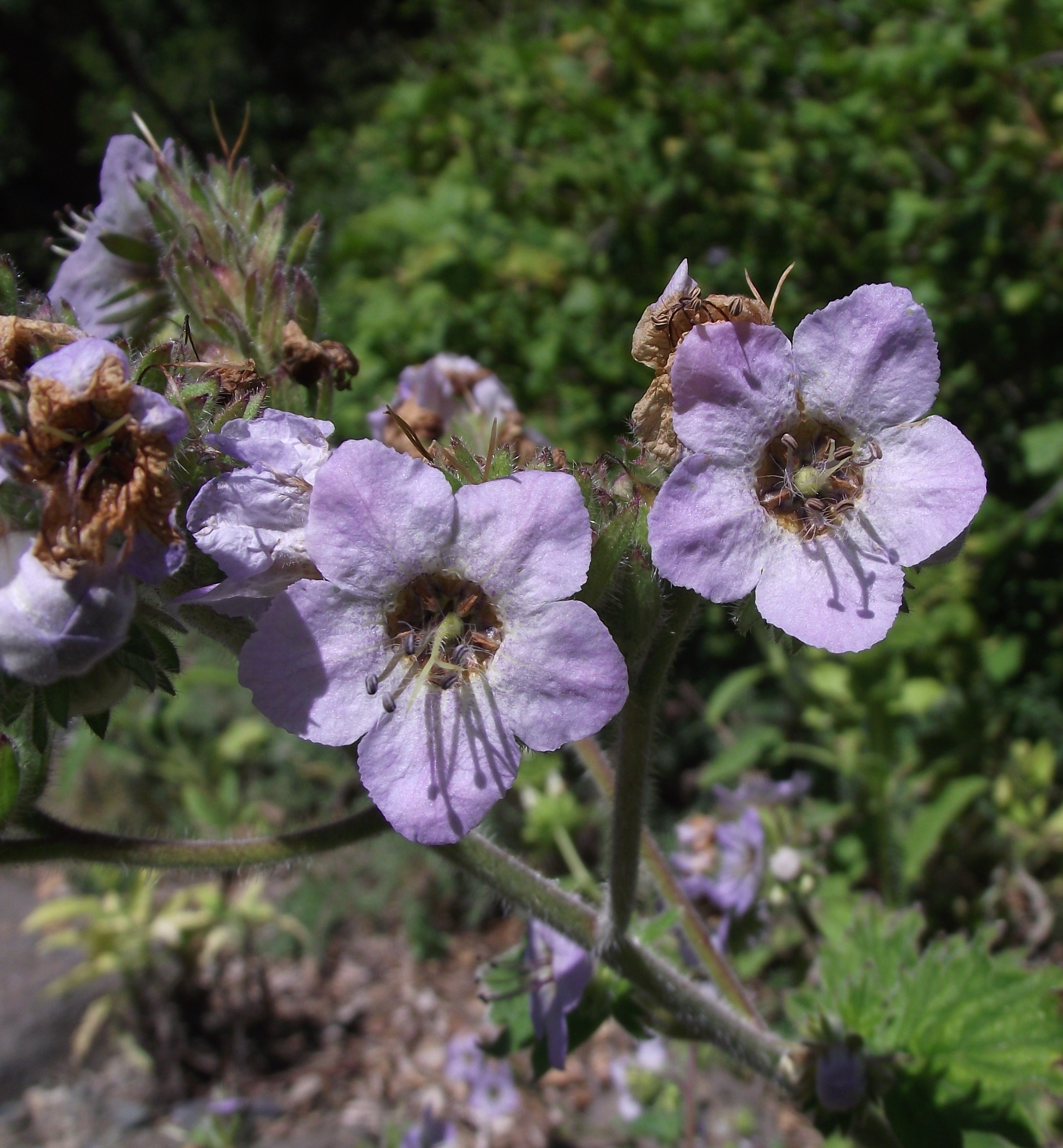

Scientific classification
- Kingdom: Plantae
- Clade: Tracheophytes
- Clade: Angiosperms
- Clade: Eudicots
- Clade: Asterids
- Order: Boraginales
- Family: Hydrophyllaceae
- Genus: Phacelia
- Species: P. bolanderi

Binomial name
- Phacelia bolanderi A.Gray

= Phacelia bolanderi =

Species of plant

Phacelia bolanderi is a species of flowering plant known by several common names, including Bolander's phacelia, Bolander's scorpionweed, blue-flowered grape-leaf, and caterpillar flower. The plant is native to Oregon and coastal northern California. It was named for the California botanist Henry Nicholas Bolander.

It bears attractive papery inch-wide purple, lavender, or blue flowers and strongly toothed leaves which resemble those of grape. The plant blooms later than most others, and is commonly in flower during the hottest summer months.
