= Lane County Clerk's Building =

- U.S. National Register of Historic Places
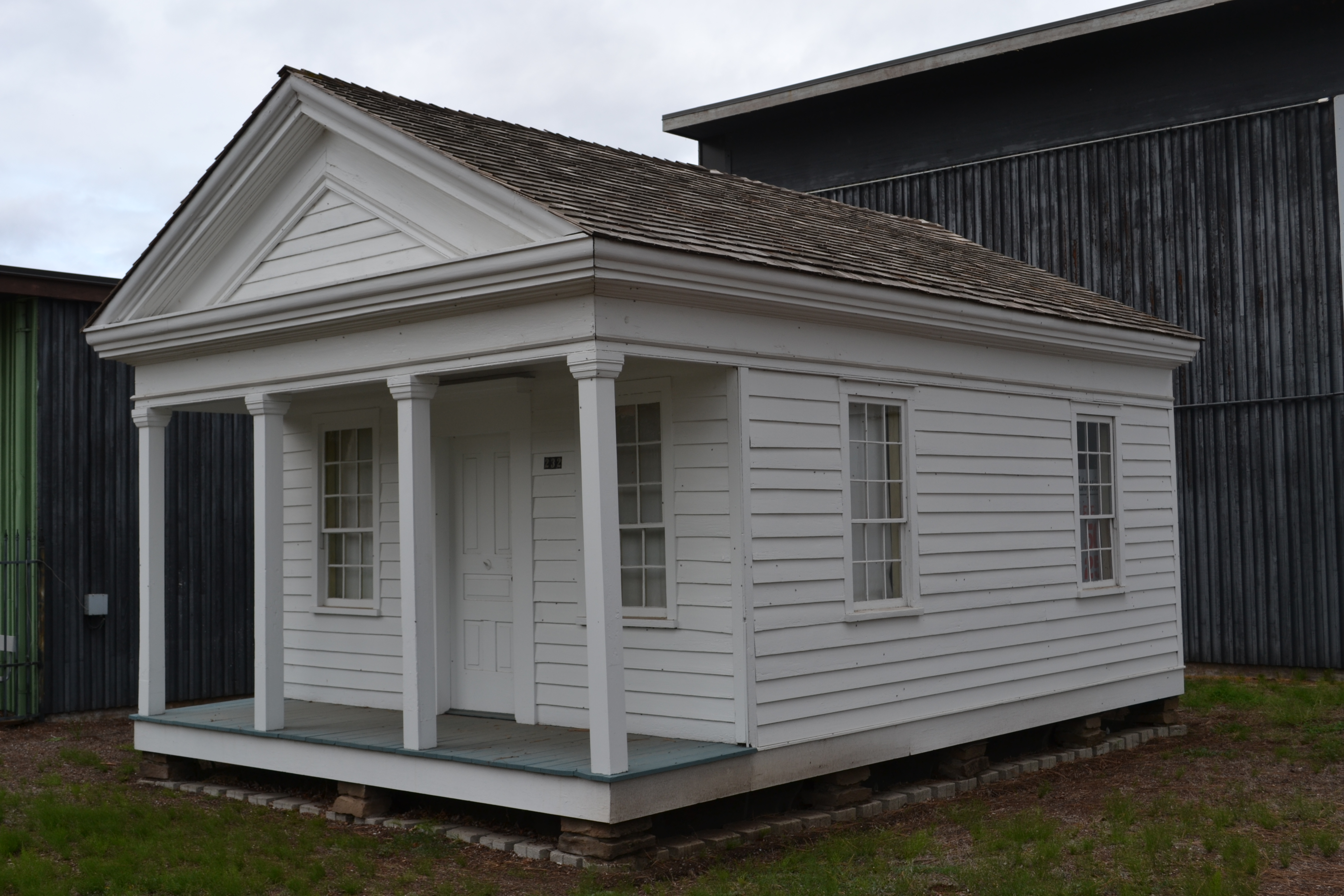

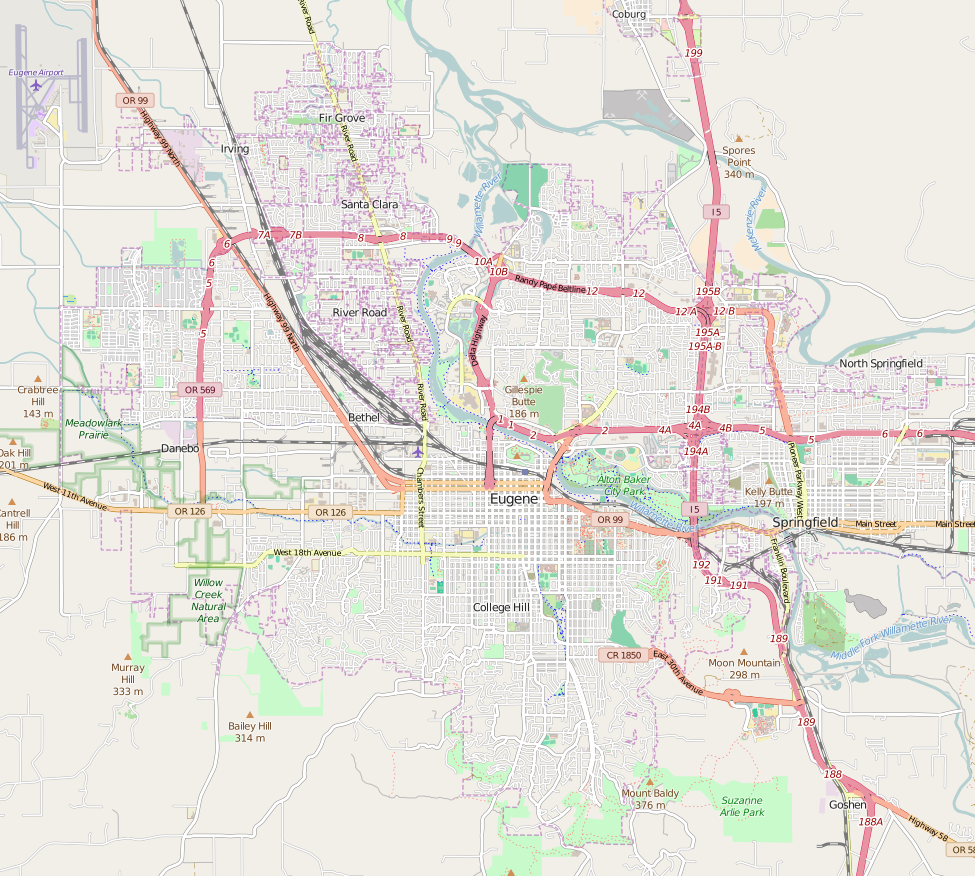
- Location within Eugene OR Location within Oregon
- Location: 740 W. 13th Ave., Eugene, Oregon
- Coordinates: 44°2′41.6″N 123°6′13.5″W
- Area: less than one acre
- Built: 1853
- Architect: Prior Blair
- Architectural style: Greek Revival
- NRHP reference No.: 83004174
- Added to NRHP: June 6, 2011

The Lane County Clerk's Building, located in Eugene, Oregon, is listed on the National Register of Historic Places.

== See also ==
- National Register of Historic Places listings in Lane County, Oregon
