= John H. Klippart =

American agriculturalist (1823–1878)

John Hancock Klippart
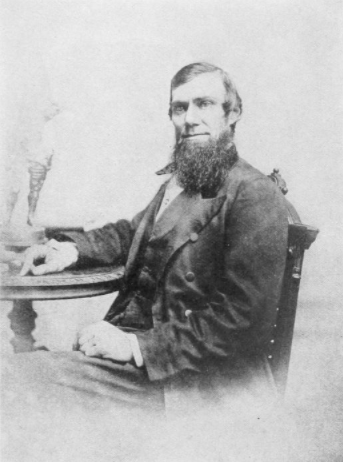
- Born: July 26, 1823; Canton, Ohio
- Died: October 24, 1878 (aged 55); Columbus, Ohio
- Occupation: Agriculturalist

Signature
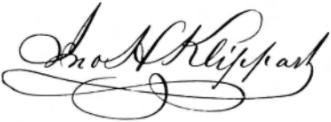

John Hancock Klippart (1823–1878) was an American agriculturist and expert on wheat farming.

== Biography ==
Klippart was born in Canton, Ohio on July 26, 1823. He worked for the Ohio State Board of Agriculture and has been described as the most "informed individual" of his time on wheat culture. He published a large book in 1858 documenting information about wheat plants and farming.

Klippart was an early evolutionary thinker to have mentioned the concept of natural selection. According to science historian Conway Zirkle, "In 1858, Klippart showed how nature could displace one variety or species of wheat by another."

He died at his home in Columbus, Ohio on October 24, 1878, aged 55.

== Publications ==
- An Essay on the Origin, Growth, Diseases, Varieties, etc., of the Wheat Plant (1858)
- The Wheat Plant: Its Origin, Culture, Growth, Development, Composition, Varieties, Diseases, Etc., Etc. Together With a Few Remarks on Indian Corn, its Culture, Etc. (1860)
- The Principles and Practice of Land Drainage (1861)
