= Henry Nicholas Bolander =

German-American botanist and educator

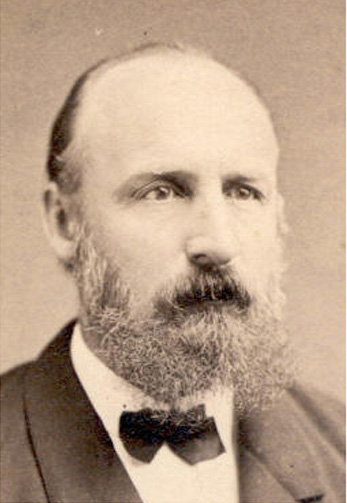

6th California State Superintendent of Public Instruction
- In office December 4, 1871 – December 5, 1875
- Governor: Henry H. Haight; Newton Booth; Romualdo Pacheco
- Preceded by: Oscar Penn Fitzgerald
- Succeeded by: Ezra S. Carr

Personal details
- Born: February 22, 1831
- Died: August 28, 1897 (aged 66)
- Party: Republican
- Profession: Botanist

Henry Nicholas Bolander (February 22, 1831 – August 28, 1897) was a German-American botanist and educator.

== Early life ==
Bolander was born in Schlüchtern, Grand Duchy of Hesse and emigrated to the United States in 1846. He joined his uncle in Columbus, Ohio and enrolled in the Columbus Lutheran Seminary. He graduated from the seminary and was ordained a minister but never served in a religious office. Instead, he began his career teaching at the local German-American schools in 1851. In 1857 he married Anna Marie Jenner, a widow who had three children from her previous marriage; together, they eventually added five more children to their family.

At the same time, Bolander became acquainted with a neighbor, Leo Lesquereux, a well-known botanist who had emigrated from Switzerland in 1847. Lesquereux inspired Bolander to develop a keen interest in botany. Bolander began to travel widely in Ohio and neighboring states to study the flora and collect specimens. In 1857 he teamed with John H. Klippart, the Ohio Secretary of Agriculture, to create a catalog of the plants of Ohio. However, in 1860 failing health caused Bolander to return to Germany and the catalog was never published.

Bolander recovered his health and returned to America the following year, settling this time in San Francisco, California. He taught for the San Francisco School District and made the acquaintance of members of the California Academy of Sciences and the California Geological Survey. In 1864 he succeeded William Henry Brewer as State Botanist for California and for the next several years he made extensive surveys and collections of plants for the Survey.

Bolander published few botanical papers but he was widely recognized for his knowledge of California plants and his ability to identify and collect new species. He corresponded frequently with eminent botanists and shared his collections with them. They showed their gratitude, in part, by naming many new species in his honor—by one count, 37 species of flowering plants bore his name.

== Superintendancy and later career ==
In 1871 Bolander was elected California Superintendent of Public Instruction, an office which he held until December 1875. During his term he revised the course of study for California schools, requiring the study of music and drawing. At the same time, important education statutes were enacted by the State Legislature. California led the nation by implementing a strong compulsory education law for children eight to fourteen years of age. California also passed laws ensuring women could serve on school boards and in other educational offices; furthermore, women employed as teachers were guaranteed the same pay as men.

At the end of his term, Bolander did not seek re-election and instead ran successfully for Superintendent of Schools of San Francisco. He held the office for almost two years and then resigned in November, 1877. In 1878, Bolander travelled to Guatemala where he did educational work for the next seven years. He reportedly travelled widely to South America, Africa, and Europe but the details are not clear. In 1883, Bolander settled in Portland, Oregon and taught modern languages at Bishop Scott Academy.
