= 1902 Oregon Agricultural Aggies football team =

American college football season

1902 Oregon Agricultural Aggies football
- Conference: Northwest Intercollegiate Athletic Association
- Record: 4–1–1 (1–1–1 NIAA)
- Head coach: Fred Herbold (1st season)
- Captain: John Gault
- Home stadium: OAC Field

1902 Northwest Intercollegiate Athletic Association football standings
	Conf.					Overall
Team	W		L		T	W		L		T
Washington $	4	–	0	–	0	5	–	1	–	0
Oregon	2	–	0	–	1	3	–	1	–	3
Montana Agricultural	1	–	0	–	0	4	–	0	–	1
Washington State	2	–	1	–	0	2	–	3	–	0
Oregon Agricultural	1	–	1	–	1	4	–	1	–	1
Montana	0	–	1	–	0	0	–	2	–	0
Whitman	1	–	3	–	0	2	–	4	–	0
Idaho	0	–	3	–	0	1	–	3	–	1
Pacific (OR)	—	–	—	–	—	—	–	—	–	—
$ – Conference champion

1902 Far West college football independents records
	Conf.			Overall
Team	W	L	T	W		L		T
California		–		8	–	0	–	0
Arizona		–		5	–	0	–	0
Wyoming		–		1	–	0	–	0
Montana Agricultural		–		4	–	0	–	1
Stanford		–		6	–	1	–	0
Utah		–		5	–	2	–	1
Tempe Normal		–		2	–	1	–	0
Cheney Normal		–		2	–	1	–	2
USC		–		2	–	3	–	0
Idaho		–		1	–	3	–	1
Nevada State		–		1	–	2	–	0
New Mexico A&M		–		0	–	1	–	2
Utah Agricultural		–		0	–	5	–	1
Montana		–		0	–	2	–	0

The 1902 Oregon Agricultural Aggies football team represented Oregon Agricultural College (OAC)—now known as Oregon State University—as an independent during the 1902 college football season. In their first and only season under head coach Fred Herbold, the Aggies compiled a record of 4–1–1 record. Demonstrating strong defensive capabilities, the Aggies administered five shutouts in their six games, outscoring their opponents by a combined score of 157 to 16.

Right guard John Gault was the team captain.

== Background ==
By the spring of 1902 it was clear that intercollegiate football had fully returned to OAC, with team manager James Zurcher purchasing 15 leather-reinforced jerseys for use in the fall campaign. Former Oregon player and Idaho coach Fred Herbold was identified and pursued to coach the team. Herbold signed a contract with team manager Zurcher in April, binding him to coach the OAC squad from September 20 until Thanksgiving Day. Serving as an assistant coach was Charles Small.

Needed improvements were made to the football grounds, including construction of a covered grandstand at a cost of $424 and a new fence costing about $250 more. The fence was needed to replace one that was so low that it could be climbed by small boys seeking to see the game without buying tickets. About 30 men came out daily for football practice, to be drilled in the basic skills of the game.

Another important addition was made in September, when Bert Pilkington, a veteran of the football program at McMinnville College, enrolled in OAC for fall semester to study in the school's Pharmacy program. Pilkington would emerge as the team's offensive star at the fullback position and would earn honors as member of the All-Oregon Team named by The Oregonian newspaper in December. Pilkington (1879–1937) would captain the Aggie team in 1903 and 1904 before graduating in the spring of 1905.

The afternoon of October 11 saw an intersquad game at OAC Field pitting the starting eleven and the second team. Twenty-five cents general admission was charged, with those wishing to sit in the covered grandstand assessed an additional 15 cents. This intrasquad game was warm-up for the season-opener against Willamette University one week hence.

== Schedule ==
Date	Opponent	Site	Result	Attendance	Source
October 18	Willamette	OAC Field; Corvallis, OR	W 67–0		
October 25	at Washington	Athletic Park; Seattle, WA	L 6–16	2,000	
November 8	Oregon	OAC Field; Corvallis, OR (rivalry)	T 0–0		
November 14	McMinnville	OAC Field; Corvallis, OR	W 33–0		
November 23	at Willamette	Salem, OR	W 21–0		
November 27	Pacific (OR)	OAC Field; Corvallis, OR	W 31–0		

== Season in review ==
=== October 18: Willamette University ===
Scrimmage on the OAC grounds, 1902 — possibly a November 1 game of the third team against Corvallis Public School, won by OAC by a score of 32 to 0. The new fence is visible in the background.

In a game "characterized throughout by clean, gentlemanly playing" with "no wrangling," the Orangemen swamped visiting Willamette University of Salem by a score of 67 to 0. Willamette proved incapable of stopping the Aggies' speedy backs from popping long run after long run around end. Left half Floyd Williams recorded touchdown runs of 85 and 75 yards to lead the parade, while fullback Nash twice returned kickoffs 70 yards only to be stopped just short of the goal line, setting up additional scores.

A total of 12 touchdowns and 7 goals after touchdown were registered by the OAC in a bashing that was at the time the most one-sided game in school history and which would remain so for another 13 years.

=== October 25: at Washington ===
The Agrics made their longest road trip of the 1902 season for a meeting with the University of Washington on October 25. Washington received the opening kickoff and methodically drove the ball down the field in chunks of 3, 5, and 8 yards, scoring the game's first touchdown after seven minutes had elapsed. The conversion was made and the score stood at 6–0. According to the rules, OAC again kicked off, but this time their defense held and a punt was forced. Left half Floyd Williams broke a run for 10 yards around left end and right half Herb Root popped free around the right side for 15 more. After a fruitless tackles-back power run, Root again found daylight around the right side, this time for a touchdown. Nash's goal after touchdown evened the score at 6–6.

This time it was the Orange receiving the kick, but they turned the ball over on downs. Washington managed 15 more before Speidell attempted a goal from the field by placement. The 5-point kick was true and the purple-and-gold took an 11–6 lead to the halftime break.

In the second half the teams played back and forth, with Washington running up the score with another field goal from placement with 15 seconds remaining, for the 16–6 final. These would be the only points that OAC would surrender all year.

=== November 8: Oregon ===
With nose masks proudly hanging around their necks, the backfield starters (left to right): RHB Herb Root; FB Bert Pilkington; QB Harley Laughlin; LHB: Floyd Williams. Root and Pilkington were named to the All-Oregon team by The Oregonian newspaper in December.

In a hotly contested game on a sloppy Bell Field, the Oregon Agricultural College and the University of Oregon battled to a scoreless tie on November 8. It rained heavily during the game and standing water on the field made footing difficult — regarded by one Eugene reporter as "much to the advantage of the farmers as theirs was the heavier team." The home team rooters were undaunted by the weather, enthusiastically singing songs and organized yells throughout the game.

Oregon held the advantage in the first half but could not hang onto the ball, fumbling away every opportunity to score. After the first few minutes of the second half, the game was played largely in the Oregon end of the field, with both defenses performing admirably. Turnovers were copious throughout the game, with fumbles of the wet football keeping possession moving back and forth.

The longest run of the day was a 20-yard dash by Agric right halfback Herb Root, with backs Nash and Bert Pilkington also used with great effect. When time expired, OAC controlled the ball on the Oregon 35-yard line. Pilkington was lauded as "undoubtedly the best player on the field" by the reporter for the Portland Oregonian and was acknowledged to have performed "sensational work for the home team...hurdling the lines" by the reporter of the Eugene Register.

Despite their inability to score, the Orangemen twice got the ball within ten yards of paydirt on the visitors' end while their own goal was at no time seriously threatened.

=== November 14: McMinnville College ===
Next up for the Orangemen was a November 14 home game against McMinnville College (today's Linfield University). McMinnville had won a victory earlier in the year against the OAC second team and were anxious to try their hand against the varsity squad. While the spirit may have been willing, the bodies were lacking as the significantly undersized visitors were bullied all afternoon, with fullback Bert Pilkington — emerging as the Aggies' offensive star — carrying the ball across the goal line twice in the first half for a 12–0 lead at the break.

In the second half, McMinnville received the kickoff, only to fumble the ball away. Two minutes later, speedy Floyd Williams moved the ball across the goal line for the third score of the day and "it became a question only of how large the score would be." Nash and Williams contributed to the carnage in the second half, the latter on an electric 30-yard run, with a sixth touchdown coming in garbage time. Final score: OAC 33, McMinnville 0.

=== November 23: at Willamette ===
On November 23 the Agrics traveled north to Salem for a rematch with Willamette University — the same school they had crushed 67–0 in the season opener.

=== November 27: Pacific ===
During halftime one OAC wag built the atmosphere of mirth and merriment singing a new version of the 1869 tune "Little Brown Jug" to the crowd:

(1)
Oh, old P.U., you're off the track,
Your trolley has been badly switched,
Your ambitious views we'll put to snooze,
Then we will leave you badly ditched.

(chorus)
Ha, ha, ha — plain to see,
Old P.U., you are easy!
Ha, ha, ha — plain to see,
Old P.U., you are easy!

(2)
If I had a team that played such ball,
I'd put them in a fattening stall,
Feed them on strong food and hay,
Try them again the very next day,
And if I found no improvement made,
I'd bat them all on the head with a spade.

(3)
But then you're really not to blame,
You've lots of time to learn the game,
The reason we beat you today:
It is a game you cannot play.

(4)
So go home and tell your coach
That you don't amount to "moach,"
And the farmers beat you fair and square,
So for OAC, let's tear the air!

(last chorus)
Ha, ha, ha — O A C!
O A C, see, O A C!
Ha, ha, ha — O A C!
O A C, see, O A C!

== Roster ==
The starting interior line of the 1902 OAC football team (left to right): RT William Abraham; RG John Gault (captain); C Louis Burnough; LG Albert Bower; LT Lyman Bundy. Burnough was named to the All-Oregon Team by The Oregonian newspaper in December.

The following players appeared in the November 14 game against McMinnville College:

- RE: Cupper
- RT: William G. Abraham
- RG: John Gault
- C: Louis Burnough
- LG: Albert B. Bower
- LT: Lyman Bundy
- LE: Nash
- QB: Harley Laughlin, sub: Gellatly
- RHB: Herb Root
- FB: Bert Pilkington
- LHB: Floyd Williams, sub: Tharp

Three members of the squad were named by The Oregonian to its eleven-man All-Oregon Team in December: fullback Bert Pilkington, halfback Herb Root, and center Louis Burnough.
