= 1902 Cheney Normal football team =

American college football season

1902 Cheney Normal football
- Conference: Independent
- Record: 2–1–2

1902 Far West college football independents records
| | Conf. | | | Overall |
| Team | W | L | T | W | | L | | T |
|---|---|---|---|---|---|---|---|---|
| California | | – | | 8 | – | 0 | – | 0 |
| Arizona | | – | | 5 | – | 0 | – | 0 |
| Wyoming | | – | | 1 | – | 0 | – | 0 |
| Montana Agricultural | | – | | 4 | – | 0 | – | 1 |
| Stanford | | – | | 6 | – | 1 | – | 0 |
| Utah | | – | | 5 | – | 2 | – | 1 |
| Tempe Normal | | – | | 2 | – | 1 | – | 0 |
| Cheney Normal | | – | | 2 | – | 1 | – | 2 |
| USC | | – | | 2 | – | 3 | – | 0 |
| Idaho | | – | | 1 | – | 3 | – | 1 |
| Nevada State | | – | | 1 | – | 2 | – | 0 |
| New Mexico A&M | | – | | 0 | – | 1 | – | 2 |
| Utah Agricultural | | – | | 0 | – | 5 | – | 1 |
| Montana | | – | | 0 | – | 2 | – | 0 |

The 1902 Cheney Normal football team represented the State Normal School at Cheney—now known as Eastern Washington University—as an independent during the 1902 college football season. The team compiled a record of 2–1–2.

== Schedule ==
| Date | Time | Opponent | Site | Result | Attendance | Source |
|---|---|---|---|---|---|---|
| October 18 | | Davenport High School | Cheney, WA | W 53–0 | | |
| October 25 | | at Spokane High School | Natatorium Park; Spokane, WA | L 0–5 | 500 | |
| November 8 | 12:00 p.m. | Spokane High School | Cheney, WA | W 12–0 | | |
| November 27 | | Lewiston State Normal | Cheney, WA | T 0–0 | | |
| December 13 | | at Davenport High School | Davenport, WA | T 0–0 | | |
All times are in Pacific time; Source:
