= 1902 Oregon Webfoots football team =

American college football season

1902 Oregon Webfoots football
- Conference: Independent
- Record: 3–1–3
- Head coach: Marion Dolph (1st season)
- Captain: Homer Watts
- Home stadium: Kincaid Field

1902 Far West college football independents records
	Conf.			Overall
Team	W	L	T	W		L		T
California		–		8	–	0	–	0
Arizona		–		5	–	0	–	0
Wyoming		–		1	–	0	–	0
Montana Agricultural		–		4	–	0	–	1
Stanford		–		6	–	1	–	0
Utah		–		5	–	2	–	1
Tempe Normal		–		2	–	1	–	0
USC		–		2	–	3	–	0
Idaho		–		1	–	3	–	1
Nevada State		–		1	–	2	–	0
New Mexico A&M		–		0	–	1	–	2
Utah Agricultural		–		0	–	5	–	1
Montana		–		0	–	2	–	0

The 1902 Oregon Webfoots football team represented the University of Oregon as an independent during the 1902 college football season. It was the Webfoots' ninth season. They were led by head coach Marion Dolph, and they finished the season with a record of three wins, one loss and three ties (3–1–3).

== Schedule ==
Date	Opponent	Site	Result	Source
October 18	Albany College (OR)	Kincaid Field; Eugene, OR	T 0–0	
October 22	Whitman	Kincaid Field; Eugene, OR	W 6–0	
November 1	Oregon Medical College	Kincaid Field; Eugene, OR	W 11–0	
November 8	at Oregon Agricultural	Corvallis, OR (rivalry)	T 0–0	
November 15	at Albany College (OR)	Rambler Field; Albany, OR	T 0–0	
November 21	Pacific (OR)	Kincaid Field; Eugene, OR	W 70–0	
November 27	at Multnomah Amateur Athletic Club	Multnomah Field; Portland, OR	L 0–16	
