= 1902 Washington Agricultural football team =

American college football season

1902 Washington Agricultural football
- Conference: Independent
- Record: 2–3
- Head coach: William L. Allen (2nd season)
- Captain: John Jones
- Home stadium: Rogers Field

1902 Far West college football independents records
	Conf.			Overall
Team	W	L	T	W		L		T
California		–		8	–	0	–	0
Arizona		–		5	–	0	–	0
Wyoming		–		1	–	0	–	0
Montana Agricultural		–		4	–	0	–	1
Stanford		–		6	–	1	–	0
Utah		–		5	–	2	–	1
Tempe Normal		–		2	–	1	–	0
USC		–		2	–	3	–	0
Idaho		–		1	–	3	–	1
Nevada State		–		1	–	2	–	0
New Mexico A&M		–		0	–	1	–	2
Utah Agricultural		–		0	–	5	–	1
Montana		–		0	–	2	–	0

The 1902 Washington Agricultural football team was an American football team that represented Washington Agricultural College during the 1902 college football season. The team competed as an independent under head coach William L. Allen, who returned after a one-year absence, and compiled a record of 2–3.

== Schedule ==
Date	Opponent	Site	Result	Attendance	Source
October 11	at Lewiston Normal	Lewiston, ID	L 0–12	300	
October 16	Pacific (OR)	Pullman, WA	L 5–6		
October 24	Idaho	Pullman, WA (rivalry)	W 17–0		
November 1	Whitman	Pullman, WA	W 6–5		
November 27	at Washington	Denny Field; Seattle, WA (rivalry)	L 0–16	1,000–4,000	
