= List of Arizona Wildcats football seasons =

The Arizona Wildcats football team competes in the National Collegiate Athletic Association (NCAA) Division I Football Bowl Subdivision, representing the University of Arizona. This is a list of completed seasons.

== Seasons ==
Year	Coach	Overall	Conference	Standing	Bowl/playoffs	Coaches^{#}	AP^{°}
Stuart Forbes (Independent) (1899)
1899	Stuart Forbes	1–1–1					
William W. Skinner (Independent) (1900–1901)
1900	William W. Skinner	3–1					
1901	William W. Skinner	4–1					
Leslie Gillette (Independent) (1902)
1902	Leslie Gillette	5–0					
Orin A. Kates (Independent) (1903–1904)
1903	Orin A. Kates	2–0					
1904	Orin A. Kates	3–1–2					
William M. Ruthrauff (Independent) (1905)
1905	William M. Ruthrauff	5-2					
1906	No team						
1907	No team						
H. B. Galbraith (Independent) (1908–1909)
1908	H. B. Galbraith	5–0					
1909	H. B. Galbraith	3–1					
Frank Shipp (Independent) (1910–1911)
1910	Frank Shipp	5–0					
1911	Frank Shipp	3–1–1					
Raymond L. Quigley (Independent) (1912)
1912	Raymond L. Quigley	2–1					
Frank A. King (Independent) (1913)
1913	Frank A. King	2–2					
Pop McKale (Independent) (1914–1930)
1914	Pop McKale	4–1					
1915	Pop McKale	5–3					
1916	Pop McKale	5–3					
1917	Pop McKale	3–2					
1918	No team						
1919	Pop McKale	7–1					
1920	Pop McKale	6–1					
1921	Pop McKale	7–2					
1922	Pop McKale	6–3					
1923	Pop McKale	5–3					
1924	Pop McKale	2–4					
1925	Pop McKale	3–3–1					
1926	Pop McKale	5–1–1					
1927	Pop McKale	4–2–1					
1928	Pop McKale	5–1–2					
1929	Pop McKale	7–1					
1930	Pop McKale	6–1–1					
Fred Enke (Border Intercollegiate Athletic Association) (1931)
1931	Fred Enke	3–5–1	1–1–1	T–2nd			
August W. Farwick (Border Intercollegiate Athletic Association) (1932)
1932	August W. Farwick	4–5	3–2	2nd			
Tex Oliver (Border Intercollegiate Athletic Association) (1933–1937)
1933	Tex Oliver	5–3	3–2	T–3rd			
1934	Tex Oliver	7–2–1	2–1–1	3rd			
1935	Tex Oliver	7–2	4–0	1st			
1936	Tex Oliver	5–2–3	3–0	1st			
1937	Tex Oliver	8–2	3–1	3rd			
Orian Landreth (Border Intercollegiate Athletic Association) (1938)
1938	Orian Landreth	3–6	0–3	6th			
Miles W. Casteel (Border Intercollegiate Athletic Association) (1939–1948)
1939	Miles W. Casteel	6–4	1–2	5th			
1940	Miles W. Casteel	7–2	3–1	2nd			
1941	Miles W. Casteel	7–3	5–0	1st			
1942	Miles W. Casteel	6–4	4–2	4th			
1943	No team						
1944	No team						
1945	Miles W. Casteel	5–0	0–0	N/A			
1946	Miles W. Casteel	4–4–2	2–2–1	4th			
1947	Miles W. Casteel	5–4–1	3–2	4th			
1948	Miles W. Casteel	6–5	3–2	T–3rd	L Salad		
Robert Winslow (Border Intercollegiate Athletic Association) (1949–1951)
1949	Robert Winslow	2–7–1	2–4	6th			
1950	Robert Winslow	4–6	2–4	6th			
1951	Robert Winslow	6–5	4–3	5th			
Warren B. Woodson (Border Conference) (1952–1956)
1952	Warren B. Woodson	6–4	3–2	3rd			
1953	Warren B. Woodson	4–5–1	3–2	4th			
1954	Warren B. Woodson	7–3	3–2	4th			
1955	Warren B. Woodson	5–4–1	1–2–1	5th			
1956	Warren B. Woodson	4–6	1–2	4th			
Ed Doherty (Border Intercollegiate Athletic Association) (1957–1958)
1957	Ed Doherty	1–8–1	0–4	T–5th			
1958	Ed Doherty	3–7	2–1	3rd			
Jim LaRue (Border Intercollegiate Athletic Association) (1959–1960)
1959	Jim LaRue	4–6	2–1	2nd			
1960	Jim LaRue	7–3	3–0	2nd			
Jim LaRue (Independent) (1961)
1961	Jim LaRue	8–1–1				17	
Jim LaRue (Western Athletic Conference) (1962–1966)
1962	Jim LaRue	5–5	2–2	T–2nd			
1963	Jim LaRue	5–5	2–2	T–3rd			
1964	Jim LaRue	6–3–1	3–1	T–1st			
1965	Jim LaRue	3–7	1–4	6th			
1966	Jim LaRue	3–7	1–4	5th			
Darrell Mudra (Western Athletic Conference) (1967–1968)
1967	Darrell Mudra	3–6–1	1–4	5th			
1968	Darrell Mudra	8–3	5–1	T–2nd	L Sun		
Bob Weber (Western Athletic Conference) (1969–1972)
1969	Bob Weber	3–7	3–3	5th			
1970	Bob Weber	4–6	2–4	5th			
1971	Bob Weber	5–6	3–3	3rd			
1972	Bob Weber	4–7	4–3	4th			
Jim Young (Western Athletic Conference) (1973–1976)
1973	Jim Young	8–3	6–1	T–1st			
1974	Jim Young	9–2	6–1	2nd			
1975	Jim Young	9–2	5–2	2nd		13	18
1976	Jim Young	5–6	3–4	T–5th			
Tony Mason (Western Athletic Conference) (1977)
1977	Tony Mason	5–7	3–4	5th			
Tony Mason (Pacific-10 Conference) (1978–1979)
1978	Tony Mason	5–6	3–4	T–6th			
1979	Tony Mason	6–5–1	4–3	T–3rd	L Fiesta		
Larry Smith (Pacific-10 Conference) (1980–1986)
1980	Larry Smith	5–6	3–4	T–6th			
1981	Larry Smith	6–5	4–4	T–6th			
1982	Larry Smith	6–4–1	4–3–1	5th			
1983	Larry Smith	7–3–1	4–3–1	5th			
1984	Larry Smith	7–4	5–2	T–3rd			
1985	Larry Smith	8–3–1	5–2	T–2nd	T Sun		
1986	Larry Smith	9–3	5–3	T–4th	W Aloha	10	11
Dick Tomey (Pacific-10 Conference) (1987–2000)
1987	Dick Tomey	4–4–3	2–3–3	7th			
1988	Dick Tomey	7–4	5–3	T–3rd			
1989	Dick Tomey	8–4	5–3	T–2nd	W Copper		25
1990	Dick Tomey	7–5	5–4	5th	L Aloha		
1991	Dick Tomey	4–7	3–5	T–6th			
1992	Dick Tomey	6–5–1	4–3–1	5th	L John Hancock		
1993	Dick Tomey	10–2	6–2	T–1st	W Fiesta	9	10
1994	Dick Tomey	8–4	6–2	T–2nd	L Freedom		20
1995	Dick Tomey	6–5	4–4	T–5th			
1996	Dick Tomey	5–6	3–5	T–5th			
1997	Dick Tomey	7–5	4–4	T–5th	W Insight.com		
1998	Dick Tomey	12–1	7–1	2nd	W Holiday	4	4
1999	Dick Tomey	6–6	3–5	T–6th			
2000	Dick Tomey	5–6	3–5	T–5th			
John Mackovic (Pacific-10 Conference) (2001–2003)
2001	John Mackovic	5–6	2–6	8th			
2002	John Mackovic	4–8	1–7	T–9th			
2003	John Mackovic (Note: After starting the year 1–4, Mackovic was fired and defensive coordinator Mike Hankwitz coached the team on an interim basis for the rest of the season.)	2–10	1–7	10th			
Mike Stoops (Pacific-10 / Pac-12 Conference) (2004–2011)
2004	Mike Stoops	3–8	2–6	T–8th			
2005	Mike Stoops	3–8	2–6	8th			
2006	Mike Stoops	6–6	4–5	T–5th			
2007	Mike Stoops	5–7	4–5	6th			
2008	Mike Stoops	8-5	5–4	5th	W Las Vegas		
2009	Mike Stoops	8–5	6–3	T–2nd	L Holiday		
2010	Mike Stoops	7–6	4–5	T–5th	L Alamo		
2011	Mike Stoops (Note: The team was coached by interim head coach Tim Kish for the last six games of the season after eighth-year head coach Mike Stoops was fired as head coach on October 10 after starting the season 1–5.)	4–8	2–7	T–5th (South)			
Rich Rodriguez (Pac-12 Conference) (2012–2017)
2012	Rich Rodriguez	8–5	4–5	4th (South)	W New Mexico		
2013	Rich Rodriguez	8–5	4–5	4th (South)	W AdvoCare V100		
2014	Rich Rodriguez	10–4	7–2	1st (South)	L Fiesta^{†}	17	19
2015	Rich Rodriguez	7–6	3–6	5th (South)	W New Mexico		
2016	Rich Rodriguez	3–9	1–8	6th (South)			
2017	Rich Rodriguez	7–6	5–4	3rd (South)	L Foster Farms		
Kevin Sumlin (Pac-12 Conference) (2018–2020)
2018	Kevin Sumlin	5–7	4–5	T–3rd (South)			
2019	Kevin Sumlin	4–8	2–7	6th (South)			
2020	Kevin Sumlin	0–5	0–5	6th (South)			
Jedd Fisch (Pac-12 Conference) (2021–2023)
2021	Jedd Fisch	1–11	1–8	6th (South)			
2022	Jedd Fisch	5–7	3–6	8th			
2023	Jedd Fisch	10–3	7–2	3rd	W Alamo	11	11
Brent Brennan (Big 12 Conference) (2024–present)
2024	Brent Brennan	4–8	2–7	T–13th			
2025	Brent Brennan	9-4	6-3	5th	L Holiday		
2026	Brent Brennan	7-2	4-2				
Total:		652–508–33					
National championship Conference title Conference division title or championship game berth
^{†}Indicates Bowl Coalition, Bowl Alliance, BCS, or CFP / New Years' Six bowl.; ^{#}Rankings from final Coaches Poll.; ^{°}Rankings from final AP Poll.

== Totals ==
1891–2024 totals through November 30, 2024

	Wins	Losses	Ties	Win percentage
Regular season games	0	0	0	–
Conference Championship games	6	1	0	.857
Bowl games	10	11	1	.477
All games	636	502	33	.557

Records above take into account an additional 0 victories vacated and 0 victories and 0 tie forfeited.
