= List of Arizona Wildcats head football coaches =

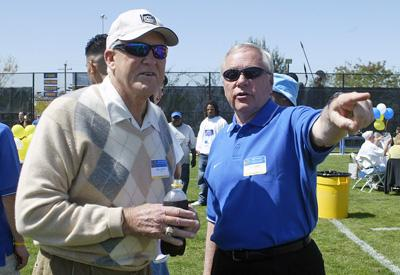
Dick Tomey (right) served as head coach of the Arizona Wildcats from 1987 to 2000 and has the most wins in program history.

The Arizona Wildcats football program is a college football team representing the University of Arizona that is a member of the Big 12 Conference. The team has had 31 head coaches and two interim head coaches since its founding in 1899. The Wildcats have played in more than 1,100 games in 113 seasons. Arizona's most recent head coach is Brent Brennan, who became the 31st head coach in 2024.

Ten coaches have led Arizona in postseason bowl games: Pop McKale, Mike Casteel, Darrell Mudra, Tony Mason, Larry Smith, Dick Tomey, Mike Stoops, Rich Rodriguez, Jedd Fisch and Brent Brennan. Four of those coaches also won conference championships: Tex Oliver captured two and Casteel one as a member of the Border Conference; and LaRue and Young captured one as a member of the Western Athletic Conference.

McKale is the leader in seasons coached with sixteen. Tomey is the leader in games won with 90. Leslie Gillett is the leader in winning percentage with a perfect 1.00. Mike Hankwitz has the lowest winning percentage of those who have coached more than one game, with 0.143. Of the 14 different head coaches who have led the Wildcats, Mudra has been inducted into the College Football Hall of Fame.

== Key ==
Key to symbols in coaches list
| General | | Overall | | Conference | | Postseason (Note: Although the first Rose Bowl Game was played in 1902, it has been continuously played since the 1916 game, and is recognized as the oldest bowl game by the NCAA. "—" indicates any season prior to 1916 when postseason games were not played.) | |
|---|---|---|---|---|---|---|---|
| No. | Order of coaches (Note: A running total of the number of head coaches, with coaches who served separate tenures being counted only once. Interim head coaches are represented with "Int" and are not counted in the running total. "—" indicates the team played but either without a coach or no coach is on record. "X" indicates an interim year without play.) | GC | Games coached | CW | Conference wins | PW | Postseason wins |
| DC | Division championships | OW | Overall wins | CL | Conference losses | PL | Postseason losses |
| CC | Conference championships | OL | Overall losses | CT | Conference ties | PT | Postseason ties |
| NC | National championships | OT | Overall ties (Note: Overtime rules in college football were introduced in 1996, making ties impossible in the period since.) | C% | Conference winning percentage | | |
| † | Elected to the College Football Hall of Fame | O% | Overall winning percentage (Note: When computing the win–loss percentage, a tie counts as half a win and half a loss.) | | | | |

== Coaches ==
List of head football coaches showing season(s) coached, overall records, conference records, postseason records, championships and selected awards (Note: Statistics correct as of the end of the 2025 NCAA Division I FBS football season.)
| No. | Name | Season(s) (Note: Arizona did not field teams in 1906, 1907, 1918, 1943, and 1944.) | GC | OW | OL | OT | O% | CW | CL | CT | C% | PW | PL | PT | CC | NC | Awards |
|---|---|---|---|---|---|---|---|---|---|---|---|---|---|---|---|---|---|
| 1 | Stuart Forbes | 1899 | 3 | 1 | 1 | 1 | 0.500 | — | — | — | — | — | — | — | — | — | — |
| 2 | William W. Skinner | 1900–1901 | 9 | 7 | 2 | 0 | 0.778 | — | — | — | — | — | — | — | — | — | — |
| 3 | Leslie Gillett | 1902 | 5 | 5 | 0 | 0 | 1.000 | — | — | — | — | — | — | — | — | — | — |
| 4 | Orin A. Kates | 1903–1904 | 8 | 5 | 1 | 2 | 0.750 | — | — | — | — | — | — | — | — | — | — |
| 5 | William M. Ruthrauff | 1905 | 7 | 5 | 2 | 0 | 0.714 | — | — | — | — | — | — | — | — | — | — |
| 6 | H. B. Galbraith | 1908–1909 | 9 | 8 | 1 | 0 | 0.889 | — | — | — | — | — | — | — | — | — | — |
| 7 | Frank Shipp | 1910–1911 | 10 | 8 | 1 | 1 | 0.850 | — | — | — | — | — | — | — | — | — | — |
| 8 | Raymond L. Quigley | 1912 | 3 | 2 | 1 | 0 | 0.667 | — | — | — | — | — | — | — | — | — | — |
| 9 | Frank A. King | 1913 | 4 | 2 | 2 | 0 | 0.500 | — | — | — | — | — | — | — | — | — | — |
| 10 | Pop McKale | 1914–1930 | 118 | 80 | 32 | 6 | 0.703 | — | — | — | — | 0 | 1 | 0 | — | — | — |
| 11 | Fred Enke | 1931 | 9 | 3 | 5 | 1 | 0.389 | 1 | 1 | 1 | 0.500 | 0 | 0 | 0 | 0 | — | — |
| 12 | August W. Farwick | 1932 | 9 | 4 | 5 | 0 | 0.444 | 3 | 2 | 0 | 0.600 | 0 | 0 | 0 | 0 | — | — |
| 13 | Tex Oliver | 1933–1937 | 47 | 32 | 11 | 4 | 0.723 | 15 | 4 | 1 | 0.775 | 0 | 0 | 0 | 2 | — | — |
| 14 | Orian Landreth | 1938 | 9 | 3 | 6 | 0 | 0.333 | 0 | 3 | 0 | .000 | 0 | 0 | 0 | 0 | — | — |
| 15 | Mike Casteel | 1939–1948 | 75 | 46 | 26 | 3 | 0.633 | 21 | 11 | 1 | 0.652 | 0 | 1 | 0 | 1 | — | — |
| 16 | Bob Winslow | 1949–1951 | 31 | 12 | 18 | 1 | 0.403 | 8 | 11 | 0 | 0.421 | 0 | 0 | 0 | 0 | — | — |
| 17 | Warren B. Woodson | 1952–1956 | 50 | 26 | 22 | 2 | 0.540 | 11 | 10 | 1 | 0.523 | 0 | 0 | 0 | 0 | — | — |
| 18 | Ed Doherty | 1957–1958 | 20 | 4 | 15 | 1 | 0.225 | 2 | 5 | 0 | 0.286 | 0 | 0 | 0 | 0 | — | — |
| 19 | Jim LaRue | 1959–1966 | 80 | 41 | 37 | 2 | 0.525 | 14 | 13 | 0 | 0.519 | 0 | 0 | 0 | 1 | — | — |
| 20 | Darrell Mudra^{†} | 1967–1968 | 21 | 11 | 9 | 1 | 0.548 | 6 | 5 | 0 | 0.545 | 0 | 1 | 0 | 0 | — | — |
| 21 | Bob Weber | 1969–1972 | 42 | 16 | 26 | 0 | 0.381 | 12 | 13 | 0 | 0.480 | 0 | 0 | 0 | 0 | — | — |
| 22 | Jim Young | 1973–1976 | 44 | 31 | 13 | 0 | 0.705 | 20 | 8 | 0 | 0.714 | 0 | 0 | 0 | 1 | — | — |
| 23 | Tony Mason | 1977–1979 | 35 | 16 | 18 | 1 | 0.471 | 10 | 11 | 0 | 0.476 | 0 | 1 | 0 | 0 | — | — |
| 24 | Larry Smith | 1980–1986 | 79 | 48 | 28 | 3 | 0.627 | 30 | 21 | 2 | 0.585 | 1 | 0 | 1 | 0 | — | — |
| 25 | Dick Tomey | 1987–2000 | 163 | 95 | 64 | 4 | 0.595 | 60 | 49 | 4 | 0.549 | 4 | 3 | 0 | 0 | — | — |
| 26 | John Mackovic | 2001–2003 | 28 | 10 | 18 | — | 0.357 | 3 | 14 | — | 0.176 | 0 | 0 | — | 0 | — | — |
| Int. | Mike Hankwitz | 2003 | 7 | 1 | 6 | — | 0.143 | 1 | 6 | — | 0.143 | 0 | 0 | — | 0 | — | — |
| 27 | Mike Stoops | 2004–2011 | 91 | 41 | 50 | — | 0.451 | 27 | 38 | — | 0.415 | 1 | 2 | — | 0 | — | — |
| Int. | Tim Kish | 2011 | 6 | 3 | 3 | — | 0.500 | 2 | 3 | — | 0.400 | 0 | 0 | — | 0 | — | — |
| 28 | Rich Rodriguez | 2012–2017 | 78 | 43 | 35 | — | 0.551 | 24 | 30 | — | 0.444 | 3 | 2 | — | 0 | — | — |
| 29 | Kevin Sumlin | 2018–2020 | 29 | 9 | 20 | — | 0.310 | 6 | 17 | — | 0.261 | 0 | 0 | — | 0 | — | — |
| 30 | Jedd Fisch | 2021–2023 | 37 | 16 | 21 | — | 0.432 | 11 | 16 | — | 0.407 | 1 | 0 | — | 0 | — | — |
| 31 | Brent Brennan | 2024–present | 34 | 20 | 14 | — | 0.588 | 12 | 12 | — | 0.500 | 0 | 1 | — | 0 | — | — |

== Statistical leaders ==
Updated as of January 2024

Most overall wins

- Dick Tomey – 95 Wins

Most Pac-12 wins

- Dick Tomey – 60 Wins

Highest overall winning percentage (min. 20 games)

- Tex Oliver – 0.723%

Highest Pac-12 winning percentage (min. 20 games)

- Tex Oliver – 0.762%

Lowest overall winning percentage (min. 20 games)

- Ed Doherty – 0.225%

Lowest Pac-12 winning percentage (min. 20 games)

- John Mackovic – 0.176%

Pac-12 championships

- None

National championships

- None
