= List of Washington State Cougars football seasons =

The following is a list of Washington State Cougars football seasons for the football team that has represented Washington State University in NCAA competition.

== Seasons ==
Year	Coach	Overall	Conference	Standing	Bowl/playoffs	Coaches^{#}	AP^{°}
William Goodyear (Independent) (1894)
1894	William Goodyear	1–1					
Fred Waite (Independent) (1895)
1895	Fred Waite	2–0					
David A. Brodie (Independent) (1896)
1896	David A. Brodie	2–0–1					
Frank Shively (Independent) (1898–1899)
1898	Frank Shively	0–0–1					
1899	Frank Shively	1–1					
William L. Allen (Independent) (1900)
1900	William L. Allen	4–0–1					
William Namack (Independent) (1901)
1901	William Namack	4–1					
William L. Allen (Independent) (1902)
1902	William L. Allen	2–3					
James N. Ashmore (Independent) (1903)
1903	James N. Ashmore	3–3–2					
Everett Sweeley (Independent) (1904–1905)
1904	Everett Sweeley	2–2					
1905	Everett Sweeley	4–4					
John R. Bender (Independent) (1906–1907)
1906	John R. Bender	6–0					
1907	John R. Bender	7–1					
Walter Rheinschild (Northwest Conference) (1908)
1908	Walter Rheinschild	4–0–2	1–0–2	2nd			
Willis Kienholz (Independent) (1909)
1909	Willis Kienholz	4–1					
Oscar Osthoff (Independent) (1910–1911)
1910	Oscar Osthoff	2–3					
1911	Oscar Osthoff	3–3					
John R. Bender (Northwest Conference) (1912–1914)
1912	John R. Bender	2–3	2–3	T–3rd			
1913	John R. Bender	4–4	1–3	5th			
1914	John R. Bender	2–4	2–3	4th			
William H. Dietz (Independent) (1915–1916)
1915	William H. Dietz	7–0			W Rose		
1916	William H. Dietz	4–2					
William H. Dietz (Pacific Coast Conference) (1917)
1917	William H. Dietz	6–0–1	3–0	1st			
Emory Alvord (Independent) (1918)
1918	Emory Alvord	1–1					
Gus Welch (Pacific Coast Conference) (1919–1922)
1919	Gus Welch	5–2	2–2	T–3rd			
1920	Gus Welch	5–1	1–1	T–3rd			
1921	Gus Welch	4–2–1	2–1–1	2nd			
1922	Gus Welch	2–5	1–5	7th			
Albert Exendine (Pacific Coast Conference) (1923–1925)
1923	Albert Exendine	2–4–1	1–3–1	T–6th			
1924	Albert Exendine	1–5–2	0–4–1	8th			
1925	Albert Exendine	3–4–1	2–3	T–6th			
Babe Hollingbery (Pacific Coast Conference) (1926–1942)
1926	Babe Hollingbery	6–1	4–1	T–3rd			
1927	Babe Hollingbery	3–3–2	1–3–1	7th			
1928	Babe Hollingbery	7–3	4–3	4th			
1929	Babe Hollingbery	10–2	4–2	5th			
1930	Babe Hollingbery	9–1	6–1	1st	L Rose		
1931	Babe Hollingbery	6–4	4–3	4th			
1932	Babe Hollingbery	7–1–1	5–1–1	2nd			
1933	Babe Hollingbery	5–3–1	3–3–1	T–5th			
1934	Babe Hollingbery	4–3–1	4–0–1	2nd			
1935	Babe Hollingbery	5–3–1	3–2	T–4th			
1936	Babe Hollingbery	6–3–1	6–2–1	2nd			
1937	Babe Hollingbery	3–3–3	3–3–2	T–4th			
1938	Babe Hollingbery	2–8	1–7	9th			
1939	Babe Hollingbery	4–5	3–5	6th			
1940	Babe Hollingbery	4–4–2	3–4–2	4th			
1941	Babe Hollingbery	6–4	5–3	T–2nd			19
1942	Babe Hollingbery	6–2–2	5–1–1	2nd			17
1943	No team						
1944	No team						
Phil Sarboe (Pacific Coast Conference) (1945–1949)
1945	Phil Sarboe	6–2–1	6–2–1	2nd			
1946	Phil Sarboe	1–6–1	1–5–1	8th			
1947	Phil Sarboe	3–7	2–5	T–7th			
1948	Phil Sarboe	4–5–1	4–3–1	4th			
1949	Phil Sarboe	3–6	2–6	8th			
Forest Evashevski (Pacific Coast Conference) (1950–1951)
1950	Forest Evashevski	4–3–2	2–3–2	6th			
1951	Forest Evashevski	7–3	4–3	5th		14	18
Al Kircher (Pacific Coast Conference) (1952–1955)
1952	Al Kircher	4–6	3–4	5th			
1953	Al Kircher	4–6	3–4	5th			
1954	Al Kircher	4–6	3–4	5th			
1955	Al Kircher	1–7–2	1–5–1	T–7th			
Jim Sutherland (Pacific Coast Conference) (1956–1958)
1956	Jim Sutherland	3–6–1	2–5–1	7th			
1957	Jim Sutherland	6–4	5–3	4th			
1958	Jim Sutherland	7–3	6–2	2nd			
Jim Sutherland (Independent) (1959–1961)
1959	Jim Sutherland	6–4					
1960	Jim Sutherland	4–5–1					
1961	Jim Sutherland	3–7					
Jim Sutherland (Athletic Association of Western Universities) (1962–1963)
1962	Jim Sutherland	5–4–1	1–1	3rd			
1963	Jim Sutherland	3–6–1	1–1	T–3rd			
Bert Clark (Athletic Association of Western Universities) (1964–1967)
1964	Bert Clark	3–6–1	1–2–1	T–6th			
1965	Bert Clark	7–3	2–1	3rd			
1966	Bert Clark	3–7	1–3	T–6th			
1967	Bert Clark	2–8	1–5	T–7th			
Jim Sweeney (Pacific-8 Conference) (1968–1975)
1968	Jim Sweeney	3–6–1	1–3–1	7th			
1969	Jim Sweeney	1–9	0–7	8th			
1970	Jim Sweeney	1–10	0–7	8th			
1971	Jim Sweeney	4–7	2–5	7th			
1972	Jim Sweeney	7–4	4–3	T–3rd		T–17	19
1973	Jim Sweeney	5–6	4–3	4th			
1974	Jim Sweeney	2–9	1–6	7th			
1975	Jim Sweeney	3–8	0–7	8th			
Jackie Sherrill (Pacific-8 Conference) (1976)
1976	Jackie Sherrill	3–8	2–5				
Warren Powers (Pacific-8 Conference) (1977)
1977	Warren Powers	7–4 (Note: UCLA's win over Oregon was forfeited due to ineligible players.)	4–3	T–4th			
Jim Walden (Pacific-10 Conference) (1978–1986)
1978	Jim Walden	4–6–1	2–6	10th			
1979	Jim Walden	4–7 (Note: Arizona State's win over Washington State was forfeited due to ineligible players.)	3–5	9th			
1980	Jim Walden	4–7	3–4	T–7th			
1981	Jim Walden	8–3–1	5–2–1	T–4th	L Holiday		
1982	Jim Walden	3–7–1	2–4–1	8th			
1983	Jim Walden	7–4	5–3	3rd			
1984	Jim Walden	6–5	4–3	5th			
1985	Jim Walden	4–7	3–5	T–7th			
1986	Jim Walden	3–7–1	2–6–1	8th			
Dennis Erickson (Pacific-10 Conference) (1987–1988)
1987	Dennis Erickson	3–7–1	1–5–1	9th			
1988	Dennis Erickson	9–3	5–3	T–3rd	W Aloha	16	16
Mike Price (Pacific-10 Conference) (1989–2002)
1989	Mike Price	6–5	3–5	8th			
1990	Mike Price	3–8	2–6	9th			
1991	Mike Price	4–7	3–5	T–6th			
1992	Mike Price	9–3	5–3	T–3rd	W Copper	17	15
1993	Mike Price	5–6	3–5	7th			
1994	Mike Price	8–4	5–3	4th	W Alamo	19	21
1995	Mike Price	3–8	2–6	T–8th			
1996	Mike Price	5–6	3–5	T–8th			
1997	Mike Price	10–2	7–1	T–1st	L Rose	9	9
1998	Mike Price	3–8	0–8	10th			
1999	Mike Price	3–9	1–7	10th			
2000	Mike Price	4–7	2–6	T–8th			
2001	Mike Price	10–2	6–2	T–2nd	W Sun	11	10
2002	Mike Price	10–3	7–1	T–1st	L Rose^{†}	10	10
Bill Doba (Pacific-10 Conference) (2003–2007)
2003	Bill Doba	10–3	6–2	2nd	W Holiday	9	9
2004	Bill Doba	5–6	3–5	7th			
2005	Bill Doba	4–7	1–7	T–8th			
2006	Bill Doba	6–6	4–5	T–5th			
2007	Bill Doba	5–7	3–6	T–7th			
Paul Wulff (Pacific-10 / Pac-12 Conference) (2008–2011)
2008	Paul Wulff	2–11	1–8	9th			
2009	Paul Wulff	1–11	0–9	10th			
2010	Paul Wulff	2–10	1–8	10th			
2011	Paul Wulff	4–8	2–7	6th (North)			
Mike Leach (Pac-12 Conference) (2012–2019)
2012	Mike Leach	3–9	1–8	6th (North)			
2013	Mike Leach	6–7	4–5	T–4th (North)	L New Mexico		
2014	Mike Leach	3–9	2–7	T–5th (North)			
2015	Mike Leach	9–4	6–3	3rd (North)	W Sun		
2016	Mike Leach	8–5	7–2	2nd (North)	L Holiday		
2017	Mike Leach	9–4	6–3	3rd (North)	L Holiday		
2018	Mike Leach	11–2	7–2	T–1st (North)	W Alamo	10	10
2019	Mike Leach	6–7	3–6	T–5th (North)	L Cheez-It		
Nick Rolovich (Pac-12 Conference) (2020–2021)
2020	Nick Rolovich	1–3	1–3	T–5th (North)			
2021	Nick Rolovich (Note: Rolovich was fired after seven games and replaced by Jake Dickert.)	7–6	6–3	2nd (North)	L Sun		
Jake Dickert (Pac-12 Conference) (2021–2024)
2022	Jake Dickert	7–6	4–5	7th	L LA		
2023	Jake Dickert	5–7	2–7	T–9th			
2024	Jake Dickert	8–5	0–1		L Holiday		
Jimmy Rogers (Pac-12 Conference) (2025)
2025	Jimmy Rogers	7–6	1–1		W Famous Idaho Potato		
Total:		580–591–45					
National championship Conference title Conference division title or championship game berth
^{†}Indicates Bowl Coalition, Bowl Alliance, BCS, or CFP / New Years' Six bowl.; ^{#}Rankings from final Coaches Poll.
