= List of Oregon Ducks football seasons =

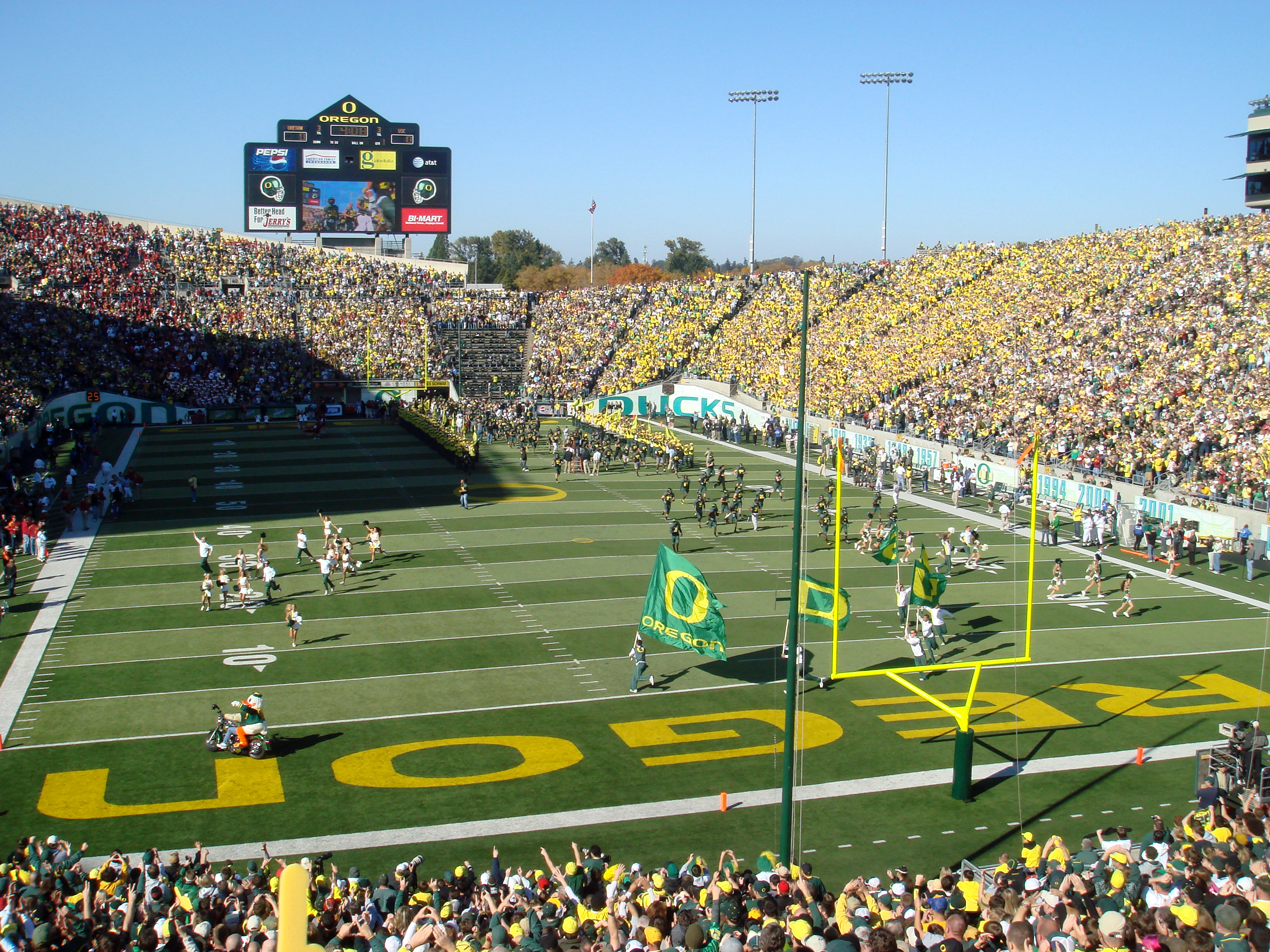
Autzen Stadium, where the Ducks have played since 1967

This is a list of seasons completed by the Oregon Ducks football team of the National Collegiate Athletic Association (NCAA) Division I Football Bowl Subdivision (FBS). Since the team's creation in 1893, the Ducks have participated in more than 1,100 officially sanctioned games.

== Seasons ==
Year	Coach	Overall	Conference	Standing	Bowl/playoffs	Coaches^{#}	AP^{°}
Cal Young & J.A. Church (Oregon Intercollegiate Football Association) (1894)
1894	Young & Church	1–2–1	1–2–1	T–4th			
Percy Benson (Oregon Intercollegiate Football Association) (1895)
1895	Percy Benson	4–0	4–0	1st			
J.F. Frick (Independent) (1896)
1896	J.F. Frick	2–1					
Joe Smith (Independent) (1897)
1897	Joe Smith	1–1					
Frank W. Simpson (Independent) (1898–1899)
1898	Frank W. Simpson	3–1					
1899	Frank W. Simpson	3–2–1					
Lawrence Kaarsberg (Independent) (1900)
1900	Lawrence Kaarsberg	3–3–1					
Warren W. Smith (Independent) (1901)
1901	Warren W. Smith	3–4–1					
Marion Dolph (Independent) (1902)
1902	Marion Dolph	3–1–3					
Warren W. Smith (Independent) (1903)
1903	Warren W. Smith	4–2–1					
Richard Shore Smith (Independent) (1904)
1904	Richard Shore Smith	5–3					
Bruce Shorts (Independent) (1905)
1905	Bruce Shorts	4–2–2					
Hugo Bezdek (Independent) (1906)
1906	Hugo Bezdek	5–0–1					
Gordon B. Frost (Independent) (1907)
1907	Gordon B. Frost	5–1					
Robert Forbes (Northwest Conference) (1908–1909)
1908	Robert Forbes	5–2	1–2	T–3rd			
1909	Robert Forbes	3–3					
Bill Warner (Independent) (1910–1911)
1910	Bill Warner	4–1					
1911	Bill Warner	3–2					
Louis Pinkham (Northwest Conference) (1912)
1912	Louis Pinkham	3–4	2–3	T–4th			
Hugo Bezdek (Northwest Conference) (1913–1914)
1913	Hugo Bezdek	3–3–1	1–1–1	4th			
1914	Hugo Bezdek	4–2–1	3–1–1	3rd			
Hugo Bezdek (Independent) (1915)
1915	Hugo Bezdek	7–2					
Hugo Bezdek (Pacific Coast Conference) (1916–1917)
1916	Hugo Bezdek	7–0–1	2–0–1	2nd (Note: The tiebreaker for the Pacific Coast Conference went to Washington due to Oregon's use of ineligible players.)	W Rose		
1917	Hugo Bezdek	4–3	1–2	4th			
Charles A. Huntington (Pacific Coast Conference) (1918–1923)
1918	Charles A. Huntington	4–2	2–1	2nd			
1919	Charles A. Huntington	5–2	2–1	1st	L Rose		
1920	Charles A. Huntington	3–2–1	1–1–1	3rd			
1921	Charles A. Huntington	5–1–3	0–1–2	5th			
1922	Charles A. Huntington	6–1–1	3–0–1	2nd			
1923	Charles A. Huntington	3–4–1	0–4–1	8th			
Joe Maddock (Pacific Coast Conference) (1924)
1924	Joe Maddock	4–3–2	2–2–1	6th			
Richard Shore Smith (Pacific Coast Conference) (1925)
1925	Richard Shore Smith	1–5–1	0–5	9th			
John McEwan (Pacific Coast Conference) (1926–1929)
1926	John McEwan	2–4–1	1–4	6th			
1927	John McEwan	2–4–1	0–4–1	8th			
1928	John McEwan	9–2	4–2	4th			
1929	John McEwan	7–3	4–1	T–3rd			
Clarence Spears (Pacific Coast Conference) (1930–1931)
1930	Clarence Spears	7–2	3–1	4th			
1931	Clarence Spears	6–2–2	3–1–1	3rd			
Prink Callison (Pacific Coast Conference) (1932–1937)
1932	Prink Callison	6–3–1	2–2–1	T–5th			
1933	Prink Callison	9–1	4–1	T–1st			
1934	Prink Callison	6–4	4–2	4th			
1935	Prink Callison	6–3	3–2	T–4th			
1936	Prink Callison	2–6–1	1–5–1	9th			
1937	Prink Callison	4–6	2–5	8th			
Tex Oliver (Pacific Coast Conference) (1938–1941)
1938	Tex Oliver	4–5	4–4	5th			
1939	Tex Oliver	3–4–1	3–3–1	5th			
1940	Tex Oliver	4–4–1	3–4–1	5th			
1941	Tex Oliver	5–5	4–4	5th			
John A. Warren (Pacific Coast Conference) (1942)
1942	John A. Warren	2–6	2–5	8th			
1943	No team						
1944	No team						
Tex Oliver (Pacific Coast Conference) (1945–1946)
1945	Tex Oliver	3–6	3–6	7th			
1946	Tex Oliver	4–4–1	3–4–1	6th			
Jim Aiken (Pacific Coast Conference) (1947–1950)
1947	Jim Aiken	7–3	5–1	T–2nd			
1948	Jim Aiken	9–2	7–0	1st	L Cotton		9
1949	Jim Aiken	4–6	2–5	T–6th			
1950	Jim Aiken	1–9	0–7	9th			
Len Casanova (Pacific Coast Conference) (1951–1958)
1951	Len Casanova	2–8	1–6	8th			
1952	Len Casanova	2–7–1	2–5	T–6th			
1953	Len Casanova	4–5–1	2–5–1	8th			
1954	Len Casanova	6–4	5–3	3rd			
1955	Len Casanova	6–4	4–3	4th			
1956	Len Casanova	4–4–2	3–3–2	T–4th			
1957	Len Casanova	7–4	6–2	T–1st	L Rose	17	
1958	Len Casanova	4–6	4–4	5th			
Len Casanova (NCAA University Division independent) (1959–1963)
1959	Len Casanova	8–2					
1960	Len Casanova	7–3–1			L Liberty		
1961	Len Casanova	4–6					
1962	Len Casanova	6–3–1					
1963	Len Casanova	8–3			W Sun		
Len Casanova (Athletic Association of Western Universities) (1964–1966)
1964	Len Casanova	7–2–1	1–2–1	T–6th			
1965	Len Casanova	4–5–1	0–5	8th			
1966	Len Casanova	3–7	1–3	T–6th			
Jerry Frei (AAWU / Pacific-8 Conference) (1967–1971)
1967	Jerry Frei	2–8	1–5	T–7th			
1968	Jerry Frei	4–6	2–4	T–5th			
1969	Jerry Frei	5–5–1	2–3	5th			
1970	Jerry Frei	6–4–1	4–3	T–2nd			
1971	Jerry Frei	5–6	2–4	6th			
Dick Enright (Pacific-8 Conference) (1972–1973)
1972	Dick Enright	4–7	2–5	T–6th			
1973	Dick Enright	2–9	2–5	T–5th			
Don Read (Pacific-8 Conference) (1974–1976)
1974	Don Read	2–9	0–7	8th			
1975	Don Read	3–8	2–5	6th			
1976	Don Read	4–7	1–6	T–7th			
Rich Brooks (Pacific-8 / Pac-10 Conference) (1977–1994)
1977	Rich Brooks	3–8 (Note: UCLA's win over Oregon was forfeited due to ineligible players.)	1–6	7th			
1978	Rich Brooks	2–9	2–5	8th			
1979	Rich Brooks	6–5 (Note: Cal claims a loss to Oregon as a victory, as "Oregon forfeited due to ineligible player.")	4–3	T–3rd			
1980	Rich Brooks	6–3–2	4–3–1	5th			
1981	Rich Brooks	2–9	1–6	9th			
1982	Rich Brooks	2–8–1	2–6	9th			
1983	Rich Brooks	4–6–1	3–3–1	T–6th			
1984	Rich Brooks	6–5	3–5	T–7th			
1985	Rich Brooks	5–6	3–4	6th			
1986	Rich Brooks	5–6	3–5	7th			
1987	Rich Brooks	6–5	4–4	T–4th			
1988	Rich Brooks	6–6	3–5	T–6th			
1989	Rich Brooks	8–4	5–3	T–2nd	W Independence		
1990	Rich Brooks	8–4	4–3	3rd	L Freedom		
1991	Rich Brooks	3–8	1–7	T–9th			
1992	Rich Brooks	6–6	4–4	T–6th	L Independence		
1993	Rich Brooks	5–6	2–6	T–8th			
1994	Rich Brooks	9–4	7–1	1st	L Rose	11	11
Mike Bellotti (Pac-10 Conference) (1995–2008)
1995	Mike Bellotti	9–3	6–2	T–2nd	L Cotton	18	18
1996	Mike Bellotti	6–5	3–5	T–5th			
1997	Mike Bellotti	7–5	3–5	T–7th	W Las Vegas		
1998	Mike Bellotti	8–4	5–3	T–3rd	L Aloha		
1999	Mike Bellotti	9–3	6–2	T–2nd	W Sun	18	19
2000	Mike Bellotti	10–2	7–1	T–1st	W Holiday	9	7
2001	Mike Bellotti	11–1	7–1	1st	W Fiesta^{†}	2	2
2002	Mike Bellotti	7–6	3–5	8th	L Seattle		
2003	Mike Bellotti	8–5	5–3	T–3rd	L Sun		
2004	Mike Bellotti	5–6	4–4	T–5th			
2005	Mike Bellotti	10–2	7–1	2nd	L Holiday	12	13
2006	Mike Bellotti	7–6	4–5	T–5th	L Las Vegas		
2007	Mike Bellotti	9–4	5–4	T–4th	W Sun	24	23
2008	Mike Bellotti	10–3	7–2	2nd	W Holiday	9	10
Chip Kelly (Pac-10 / Pac-12 Conference) (2009–2012)
2009	Chip Kelly	10–3	8–1	1st	L Rose^{†}	11	11
2010	Chip Kelly	12–1	9–0	1st	L BCS NCG^{†}	3	3
2011	Chip Kelly	12–2	8–1	T–1st (North)	W Rose^{†}	4	4
2012	Chip Kelly	12–1	8–1	T–1st (North)	W Fiesta^{†}	2	2
Mark Helfrich (Pac-12 Conference) (2013–2016)
2013	Mark Helfrich	11–2	7–2	T–1st (North)	W Alamo	9	9
2014	Mark Helfrich	13–2	8–1	1st (North)	W Rose Bowl^{†} (CFP Semifinal); L CFP NCG^{†}	2	2
2015	Mark Helfrich	9–4	7–2	2nd (North)	L Alamo	20	19
2016	Mark Helfrich	4–8	2–7	6th (North)			
Willie Taggart (Pac-12 Conference) (2017)
2017	Willie Taggart (Note: Coach Taggart left before the Las Vegas Bowl which was coached by offensive coordinator Mario Cristobal.)	7–6	4–5	4th (North)	L Las Vegas		
Mario Cristobal (Pac-12 Conference) (2017–2021)
2018	Mario Cristobal	9–4	5–4	4th (North)	W Redbox		
2019	Mario Cristobal	12–2	8–1	1st (North)	W Rose^{†}	5	5
2020	Mario Cristobal	4–3	3–2	2nd (North)	L Fiesta^{†}		
2021	Mario Cristobal (Note: Coach Cristobal left before the Alamo Bowl which was coached by offensive coordinator Bryan McClendon.)	10–4	7–2	1st (North)	L Alamo	21	22
Dan Lanning (Pac-12 Conference) (2022–2023)
2022	Dan Lanning	10–3	7–2	T–2nd	W Holiday	16	15
2023	Dan Lanning	12–2	8–1	2nd	W Fiesta^{†}	7	6
Dan Lanning (Big Ten Conference) (2024–present)
2024	Dan Lanning	13–1	9–0	1st	L Rose^{†} (CFP Quarterfinal)	4	3
2025	Dan Lanning	13–2	8–1	3rd	W CFP First Round^{†} W Orange^{†} (CFP Quarterfinal); L Peach^{†} (CFP Semifinal)	4	4
Total:		732–515–46					
National championship Conference title Conference division title or championship game berth
^{†}Indicates Bowl Coalition, Bowl Alliance, BCS, or CFP / New Years' Six bowl.; ^{#}Rankings from final Coaches Poll.
