= Arizona–New Mexico football rivalry =

American college football rivalry

- Arizona Wildcats New Mexico Lobos
- First meeting: November 26, 1908; Arizona, 10–5
- Latest meeting: August 31, 2024; Arizona, 61–39
- Next meeting: TBD
- Stadiums: Arizona Stadium; Tucson, Arizona, U.S. University Stadium; Albuquerque, New Mexico, U.S.
- Trophy: Kit Carson Rifle (1938–1990)

Statistics
- Total meetings: 68
- All-time series: Arizona leads, 45–20–3
- Largest victory: Arizona, 38–0 (1950)
- Longest win streak: Arizona, 10 (1947–1956)
- Current win streak: Arizona, 2 (2015–2024)

Locations of Arizona and New Mexico

The Arizona–New Mexico football rivalry is an American college football rivalry between the Arizona Wildcats and New Mexico Lobos. They have met 68 times on the football field. Arizona leads the series 45–20–3.

== Kit Carson Rifle ==
From 1938 to 1990, the winner of the rivalry took ownership of the Kit Carson Rifle. The gun is a Springfield Model 1866 rifle that is rumored to have once belonged to the famous frontier scout, Kit Carson. Game scores from each game are carved into the stock of the rifle. Prior to the 1997 Insight.com Bowl, the two schools announced that they would retire the rifle due to concerns of its history of violence against Native Americans and it has not been used during any subsequent games between the two schools.

== Game results ==
Arizona victories	New Mexico victories	Tie games

No.	Date	Location	Winner	Score
1	November 26, 1908	Albuquerque, NM	Arizona	10–5
2	November 13, 1909	Tucson, AZ	New Mexico	23–11
3	November 24, 1910 (Note: Game not played; Arizona won by forfeit)	Tucson, AZ	Arizona	1–0
4	November 30, 1911	Albuquerque, NM	Arizona	6–0
5	November 30, 1912	Tucson, AZ	Arizona	22–9
6	November 21, 1913	Albuquerque, NM	Arizona	7–3
7	November 20, 1920	Tucson, AZ	Arizona	28–7
8	November 19, 1921	Albuquerque, NM	Arizona	24–0
9	November 18, 1922	Tucson, AZ	Arizona	10–0
10	November 3, 1923	Albuquerque, NM	Arizona	14–7
11	November 11, 1924	Tucson, AZ	New Mexico	3–0
12	November 7, 1925	Albuquerque, NM	Arizona	24–0
13	November 6, 1926	Tucson, AZ	Arizona	21–0
14	November 5, 1927	Albuquerque, NM	New Mexico	7–6
15	November 3, 1928	Tucson, AZ	Tie	6–6
16	November 23, 1929	Albuquerque, NM	Arizona	6–0
17	November 15, 1930	Tucson, AZ	Arizona	33–0
18	November 14, 1931	Albuquerque, NM	Tie	7–7
19	November 11, 1932	Tucson, AZ	Arizona	13–6
20	November 11, 1933	Albuquerque, NM	New Mexico	7–0
21	November 3, 1934	Tucson, AZ	Arizona	14–6
22	November 23, 1935	Albuquerque, NM	Arizona	38–6
23	November 7, 1936	Tucson, AZ	Arizona	28–0
24	November 13, 1937	Albuquerque, NM	Arizona	23–0
25	October 29, 1938	Tucson, AZ	New Mexico	20–7
26	November 25, 1939	Albuquerque, NM	New Mexico	7–6
27	November 23, 1940	Tucson, AZ	New Mexico	13–12
28	October 18, 1941	Albuquerque, NM	Arizona	31–6
29	November 7, 1942	Tucson, AZ	Arizona	14–13
30	November 16, 1946	Albuquerque, NM	Tie	13–13
31	October 25, 1947	Tucson, AZ	Arizona	22–12
32	November 6, 1948	Albuquerque, NM	Arizona	14–6
33	November 5, 1949	Tucson, AZ	Arizona	46–14
34	November 4, 1950	Albuquerque, NM	Arizona	38–0
35	November 3, 1951	Tucson, AZ	Arizona	32–20

No.	Date	Location	Winner	Score
36	November 1, 1952	Albuquerque, NM	Arizona	13–7
37	October 10, 1953	Tucson, AZ	Arizona	20–0
38	October 23, 1954	Albuquerque, NM	Arizona	41–7
39	November 19, 1955	Tucson, AZ	Arizona	27–6
40	October 20, 1956	Albuquerque, NM	Arizona	26–12
41	October 19, 1957	Tucson, AZ	New Mexico	27–0
42	October 18, 1958	Albuquerque, NM	New Mexico	33–13
43	October 17, 1959	Tucson, AZ	New Mexico	28–7
44	October 22, 1960	Albuquerque, NM	Arizona	26–14
45	October 21, 1961	Tucson, AZ	Arizona	22–21
46	September 29, 1962	Albuquerque, NM	New Mexico	35–25
47	December 7, 1963	Tucson, AZ	New Mexico	22–15
48	October 10, 1964	Albuquerque, NM	New Mexico	10–7
49	October 9, 1965	Tucson, AZ	New Mexico	24–2
50	October 8, 1966	Albuquerque, NM	Arizona	36–15
51	November 4, 1967	Tucson, AZ	Arizona	48–13
52	September 28, 1968	Albuquerque, NM	Arizona	19–8
53	October 25, 1969	Tucson, AZ	Arizona	52–28
54	November 7, 1970	Albuquerque, NM	New Mexico	35–7
55	October 30, 1971	Tucson, AZ	New Mexico	34–28
56	October 14, 1972	Albuquerque, NM	Arizona	27–15
57	October 13, 1973	Tucson, AZ	Arizona	22–14
58	September 28, 1974	Albuquerque, NM	#15 Arizona	15–10
59	October 25, 1975	Tucson, AZ	New Mexico	44–34
60	November 20, 1976	Albuquerque, NM	New Mexico	21–15
61	November 12, 1977	Tucson, AZ	Arizona	15–13
62	September 19, 1987	Tucson, AZ	Arizona	20–9
63	September 15, 1990	Albuquerque, NM	#20 Arizona	25–10
64	December 27, 1997	Tucson, AZ	Arizona	20–14
65	September 15, 2007	Tucson, AZ	New Mexico	29–27
66	September 13, 2008	Albuquerque, NM	New Mexico	36–28
67	December 19, 2015	Albuquerque, NM	Arizona	45–37
68	August 31, 2024	Tucson, AZ	#21 Arizona	61–39
Series: Arizona leads 45–20–3

- Non-conference games (34: 1908–1930, 1951–1961 and 1978–2024)
- Two bowl games: 1997 and 2015
- Not played in 46 seasons (1914–1919, 1943–1945, 1978–1986, 1988–1989, 1991–1996, 1998–2006, 2009–2014 and 2016–2021)

== Coaching records ==
Since first game on November 26, 1908

=== Arizona ===
Head Coach	Team	Games	Seasons	Wins	Losses	Ties	Pct.
H. B. Galbraith	Arizona	2	1908–1909	1	1	0	.500
Frank Shipp	Arizona	2	1910–1911	2	0	0	1.000
Raymond L. Quigley	Arizona	1	1912	1	0	0	1.000
Frank A. King	Arizona	1	1913	1	0	0	1.000
Pop McKale	Arizona	0	1914–1917	0	0	0	–
No team (1918)
Pop McKale	Arizona	11	1919–1930	8	2	1	.773
Fred Enke	Arizona	1	1931	0	0	1	.500
August W. Farwick	Arizona	1	1932	1	0	0	1.000
Tex Oliver	Arizona	5	1933–1937	4	1	0	.800
Orian Landreth	Arizona	1	1938	0	1	0	.000
Mike Casteel	Arizona	7	1939–1948	4	2	1	.643
Bob Winslow	Arizona	3	1949–1951	3	0	0	1.000
Warren B. Woodson	Arizona	5	1952–1956	5	0	0	1.000
Ed Doherty	Arizona	2	1957–1958	0	2	0	.000
Jim LaRue	Arizona	8	1959–1966	3	5	0	.375
Darrell Mudra	Arizona	2	1967–1968	2	0	0	1.000
Bob Weber	Arizona	4	1969–1972	2	2	0	.500
Jim Young	Arizona	4	1973–1976	2	2	0	.500
Tony Mason	Arizona	1	1974–1979	1	0	0	1.000
Larry Smith	Arizona	0	1980–1986	0	0	0	–
Dick Tomey	Arizona	3	1987–2000	3	0	0	1.000
John Mackovic	Arizona	0	2001–2003	0	0		–
Mike Hankwitz	Arizona	0	2003	0	0		–
Mike Stoops	Arizona	2	2004–2011	0	2		.000
Tim Kish	Arizona	0	2011	0	0		–
Rich Rodriguez	Arizona	1	2012–2017	1	0		1.000
Kevin Sumlin	Arizona	0	2018–2020	0	0		–
Jedd Fisch	Arizona	0	2021–2023	0	0		–
Brent Brennan	Arizona	1	2024–present	1	0		1.000

=== New Mexico ===
Head Coach	Team	Games	Seasons	Wins	Losses	Ties	Pct.
Hermon H. Conwell	New Mexico	1	1908	0	1	0	.000
Sam P. McBirney	New Mexico	1	1909	1	0	0	1.000
Carl Hamilton	New Mexico	1	1910	0	1	0	.000
Ralph Hutchinson	New Mexico	3	1911–1916	0	3	0	.000
Frank E. Wood	New Mexico	0	1917	0	0	0	–
No team (1918)
John F. McGough	New Mexico	0	1919	0	0	0	–
Roy W. Johnson	New Mexico	11	1920–1930	2	8	1	.227
Chuck Riley	New Mexico	3	1931–1933	1	1	1	.500
Gwinn Henry	New Mexico	3	1934–1936	0	3	0	.000
Ted Shipkey	New Mexico	5	1937–1941	3	2	0	.600
Willis Barnes	New Mexico	2	1942–1946	0	2	0	.000
Berl Huffman	New Mexico	3	1947–1949	0	3	0	.000
Dudley DeGroot	New Mexico	3	1950–1952	0	3	0	.000
Bob Titchenal	New Mexico	3	1953–1955	0	3	0	.000
Dick Clausen	New Mexico	2	1956–1957	1	1	0	.500
Marv Levy	New Mexico	2	1958–1959	2	0	0	1.000
Bill Weeks	New Mexico	8	1960–1967	4	4	0	.500
Rudy Feldman	New Mexico	6	1968–1973	4	2	0	.667
Bill Mondt	New Mexico	4	1974–1979	2	2	0	.500
Joe Morrison	New Mexico	0	1980–1982	0	0	0	–
Joe Lee Dunn	New Mexico	0	1983–1986	0	0	0	–
Mike Sheppard	New Mexico	2	1987–1991	0	2	0	.000
Dennis Franchione	New Mexico	1	1992–1997	0	1	0	.000
Rocky Long	New Mexico	2	1998–2008	2	0		1.000
Mike Locksley	New Mexico	0	2009–2011	0	0		–
George Barlow	New Mexico	0	2011	0	0		–
Bob Davie	New Mexico	1	2012–2019	0	1		.000
Danny Gonzales	New Mexico	0	2020–2023	0	0		–
Bronco Mendenhall	New Mexico	1	2024	0	1		.000
Jason Eck	New Mexico	0	2025–present	0	0		–

== See also ==
- List of NCAA college football rivalry games
