= James Knight (coach) =

American football player and coach (1875–1969)

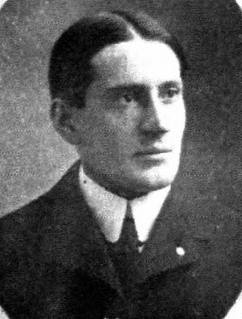

Biographical details
- Born: November 16, 1875; Ottumwa, Iowa, U.S.
- Died: March 29, 1969 (aged 93); Alameda County, California, U.S.

Playing career
- 1895: Princeton
- 1901: Michigan
- Position: End

Coaching career (HC unless noted)

Football
- 1902–1904: Washington

Men's rowing
- 1903–1906: Washington

Track
- 1903–1904: Washington

Head coaching record
- Overall: 15–4–1 (football)

Accomplishments and honors

Championships
- National (1901)

James Carnahan (Note: Knight's middle name is listed as Carnahan in Princeton and University of Michigan records. However, the 1902 Michiganensian refers to him as James Chester Knight.) Knight (November 16, 1875 – March 29, 1969) was an American football player and coach. He played college football at Princeton University in 1895 and at the University of Michigan in 1901. He was the head football coach at the University of Washington from 1902 to 1904 and compiled a 15–4–1 record, winning two Northwest Intercollegiate Athletic Association championships.

== Early years ==
Knight was born in Ottumwa, Iowa in November 1875. His father, Henry B. Knight, was an Ohio native and Presbyterian minister. His mother, Jane, was born in Pennsylvania. At the time of the 1880 United States census, Knight was living with his parents and two older brothers (Louis and Harry) in Ottumwa. At the time of the 1885 Iowa State Census, Knight was living in Fairfield, Iowa where his father was employed as a professor at Parsons College.

== Parsons College and Princeton ==
Knight began his college education at Parsons College, the liberal arts college where his father was a professor. He enrolled at Princeton University in approximately 1893. As a senior in 1895, Knight played college football as an end for the Princeton Tigers football team. While attending Princeton, Knight listed Chicago as his home city and was the vice president of Princeton's Chicago Club. He also lettered in gymnastics and rowing. He graduated from Princeton as part of the Class of 1896.

== Early professional career ==
In approximately 1898, Knight accepted a job in Chicago as the Michigan agent for Ginn & Co., a leading publisher of textbooks. He became affiliated with the Chicago Athletic Club while living in that city. Knight was a member of the Detroit Rowing Club from 1898 to 1900. At the time of the 1900 United States census, he was living in Detroit and was employed as an agent for a life insurance company. In 1901, Knight was a representative of the New York Life Insurance Company, at the Majestic Building in Detroit. In 1902, he was employed as a civil engineer for the Colorado Fuel & Iron Co.

== University of Michigan ==
In 1901, Knight enrolled in law school at the University of Michigan, receiving his law degree in 1902. While studying at Michigan, he played for the Michigan's 1901 "Point-a-Minute" football team that finished the season 11–0, outscored opponents 550 to 0, and won the first college football bowl game, the 1902 Rose Bowl. Knight started at right end in four games for the 1901 Michigan team, including the first two games of the season. He also played as a substitute in the Indiana and Carlisle games. He was also the manager and catcher for the University of Michigan law school class baseball team in 1902.

== University of Washington ==
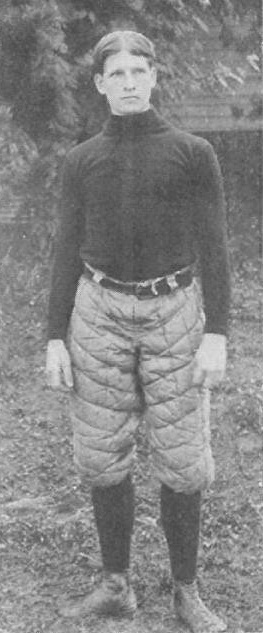
Knight from 1905 Tyee

In 1902, Knight moved to Seattle, Washington. He was employed from 1902 to 1905 as a civil engineer for the Seattle Electric Co. While in Seattle, he also served as the head athletic instructor and football coach at the University of Washington from 1902 to 1904, compiling a record of 15–4–1. He also served as the first rowing and second men's track coach at Washington. In 1905, he worked for the Boston Copper Co., of Seattle.

== Later years ==
In early 1905, Knight resigned from his post at Washington and announced his intentions to assist Art Hillebrand with coaching the Princeton football team. He attended the Princeton Theological Seminary from 1905 to 1906 and subsequently moved to Caldwell, Idaho. At the time of the 1910 United States census, Knight was living in South Caldwell, Idaho, where his occupation was listed as a farmer. In 1969, he died aged 93.

== Head coaching record ==
Year	Team	Overall	Conference	Standing	Bowl/playoffs
Washington (Northwest Intercollegiate Athletic Association) (1902–1904)
1902	Washington	5–1	4–0	1st	
1903	Washington	6–1	5–0	1st	
1904	Washington	4–2–1			
Washington:		15–4–1			
Total:		15–4–1			
