= 1902 Washington football team =

American college football season

1902 Washington football
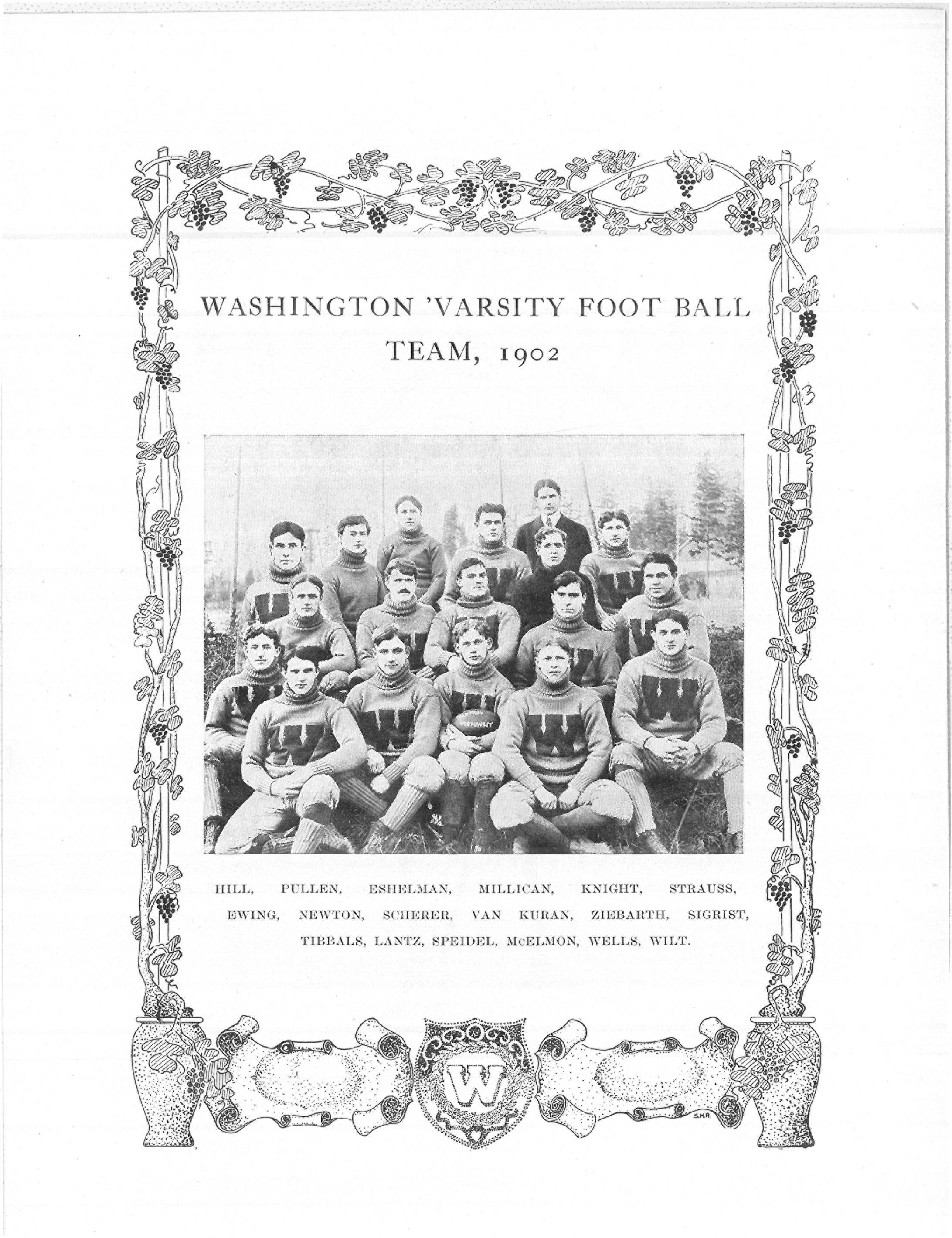

NIAA champion
- Conference: Northwest Intercollegiate Athletic Association
- Record: 5–1 (4–0 NIAA)
- Head coach: James Knight (1st season)
- Captain: Fred McElmon
- Home stadium: Denny Field

1902 Northwest Intercollegiate Athletic Association football standings
	Conf.					Overall
Team	W		L		T	W		L		T
Washington $	4	–	0	–	0	5	–	1	–	0
Oregon	1	–	0	–	1	3	–	1	–	3
Washington State	2	–	1	–	0	2	–	3	–	0
Oregon Agricultural	0	–	1	–	1	4	–	1	–	1
Whitman	1	–	3	–	0	2	–	4	–	0
Idaho	0	–	3	–	0	1	–	3	–	1
$ – Conference champion

The 1902 Washington football team was an American football team that represented the University of Washington as a member of the Northwest Intercollegiate Athletic Association (NIAA) during the 1902 college football season. In its first season under coach James Knight, the team compiled a 5–1 record. Fred McElmon was the team captain.

== Schedule ==
Date	Time	Opponent	Site	Result	Attendance	Source
October 21		All-Club team of Seattle*	Denny Field; Seattle, WA	W 24–0	200	
October 25	2:30 p.m.	Oregon Agricultural	Athletic Park; Seattle, WA	W 16–6	2,000	
November 3		at Idaho	Moscow, ID	W 10–0	500	
November 8		at Whitman	Walla Walla, WA	W 11–5		
November 15		Multnomah Athletic Club*	Athletic Park; Seattle, WA	L 0–7	1000	
November 27	1:00 p.m.	Washington Agricultural	Athletic Park; Seattle, WA (rivalry)	W 16–0	1,000–4,000	
*Non-conference game; Source:
