= Fred Herbold =

American football coach (1875–1914)

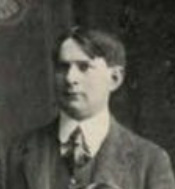
- The Gem of the Mountains 1903, University of Idaho yearbook

Biographical details
- Born: September 25, 1875; Eugene, Oregon, U.S.
- Died: May 9, 1914 (aged 38); Miles City, Montana, U.S.
- Education: Purdue University, Ph.G., 1899

Playing career
- 1894–1896: Oregon
- ?: Purdue

Coaching career (HC unless noted)
- 1900–1901: Idaho
- 1902: Oregon Agricultural

Head coaching record
- Overall: 9–3–3

Fred David Herbold (September 25, 1875 – May 9, 1914) was an American college football coach at the University of Idaho and Oregon Agricultural College, (now Oregon State University).

From Eugene, Oregon, Herbold graduated with a pharmacy degree from Purdue University in Indiana in 1899. He then worked in Montana at Butte, as a chemist for a mining company, and also coached football at Butte High School that fall.

== Collegiate coaching ==
Herbold's first head collegiate coaching position was at the University of Idaho in Moscow in 1900. He coached the Vandals for two seasons and compiled a 5–2–2 record.

In April 1902, Herbold signed a contract making him the head coach for Oregon Agricultural College in Corvallis for the forthcoming season. The contract bound him to coach the OAC squad from September 20 until Thanksgiving Day. He was the head coach of the Aggies for just one season, with the team putting up a record of 4–1–1.

Herbold's overall record in his three seasons stands at 9–3–3.

== After coaching ==
After the 1902 season at OAC, Herbold relocated to Butte, Montana, with plans to return to Corvallis for the 1903 football season. He became prosperous in agriculture and mining, building up an estate of 8,000 acres of land, including valuable coal mining properties.

In 1906, Herbold married Minnie Pope in Hailey, Idaho, on August 31. They relocated to eastern Montana to Sanders, where Herbold had acquired agricultural land near the Yellowstone River.

Herbold was elected a member of the Montana state legislature.

Herbold died of pneumonia in Miles City, Montana early in the morning of May 9, 1914, following an illness of several weeks' duration. He was 38 years old at the time of his death, and is buried at Pioneer Cemetery in Eugene, Oregon.

== Head coaching record ==
Year	Team	Overall	Conference	Standing	Bowl/playoffs
Idaho Vandals (Independent) (1900–1901)
1900	Idaho	2–0–1			
1901	Idaho	3–2–1			
Idaho:		5–2–2			
Oregon Agricultural Aggies (Independent) (1902)
1902	Oregon Agricultural	4–1–1			
Oregon Agricultural:		4–1–1			
Total:		9–3–3			
