= William L. Allen =

American football player and coach

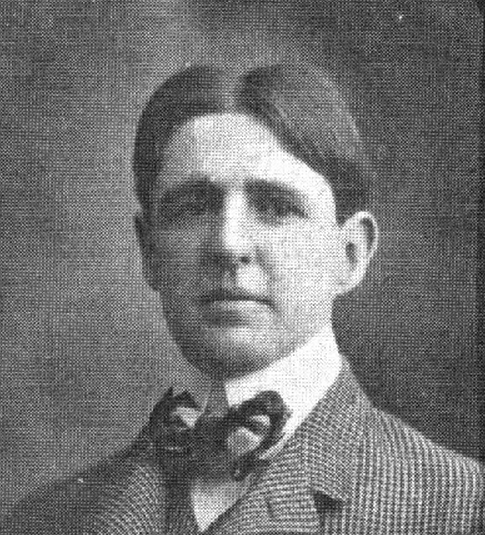
- Allen from the 1900 Michiganensian

Biographical details
- Born: c. 1877; Iowa, U.S.
- Died: May 13, 1907 (aged 30); Las Vegas, New Mexico, U.S.

Playing career
- 1897–1898: Michigan
- Position: Guard

Coaching career (HC unless noted)
- 1899: Michigan (varsity reserves)
- 1900: Washington Agricultural
- 1902: Washington Agricultural

Head coaching record
- Overall: 6–3–1

William Lindsay Allen, sometimes identified as William Luedyard Allen, (c. 1877 – May 13, 1907) was an American football player and coach. He played college football at the University of Michigan and was a player on the 1898 Michigan Wolverines football team that won the school's first Western Conference championship. During the 1900 and 1902 college football seasons, he was the head football coach at Washington Agricultural College and School of Science—now known as Washington State University—in Pullman, Washington. He compiled a record of 6–3–1 as the head coach at Washington Agricultural.

== Early years ==
Allen was born in approximately 1877 and was a resident of Sac City, Iowa. He was the son of William Allen (born c. 1816 in Virginia) and Sarah Allen (born c. 1847 in Wisconsin). At the time of the 1880 United States Census and the 1885 Iowa Census, the family was living at Sac City.

Allen began his education at the University of Notre Dame. In 1897, he enrolled at the University of Michigan as student in the Department of Laws. As a first-year student in 1897, Allen was the vice president of his class and the captain of the varsity reserve football team. As a second-year student in 1898, he played at the guard position for the undefeated 1898 Michigan Wolverines football team that won the school's first Western Conference championship. He was a starter at guard in Michigan's 21–0 victory over Michigan State Normal, its 29–0 victory over Kenyon College, and its 12–5 victory over Illinois,

As a third-year student, Allen was the coach of the varsity reserves football team. He graduated from Michigan with a Bachelor of Laws degree as part of the Class of 1900.

== Washington Agricultural ==
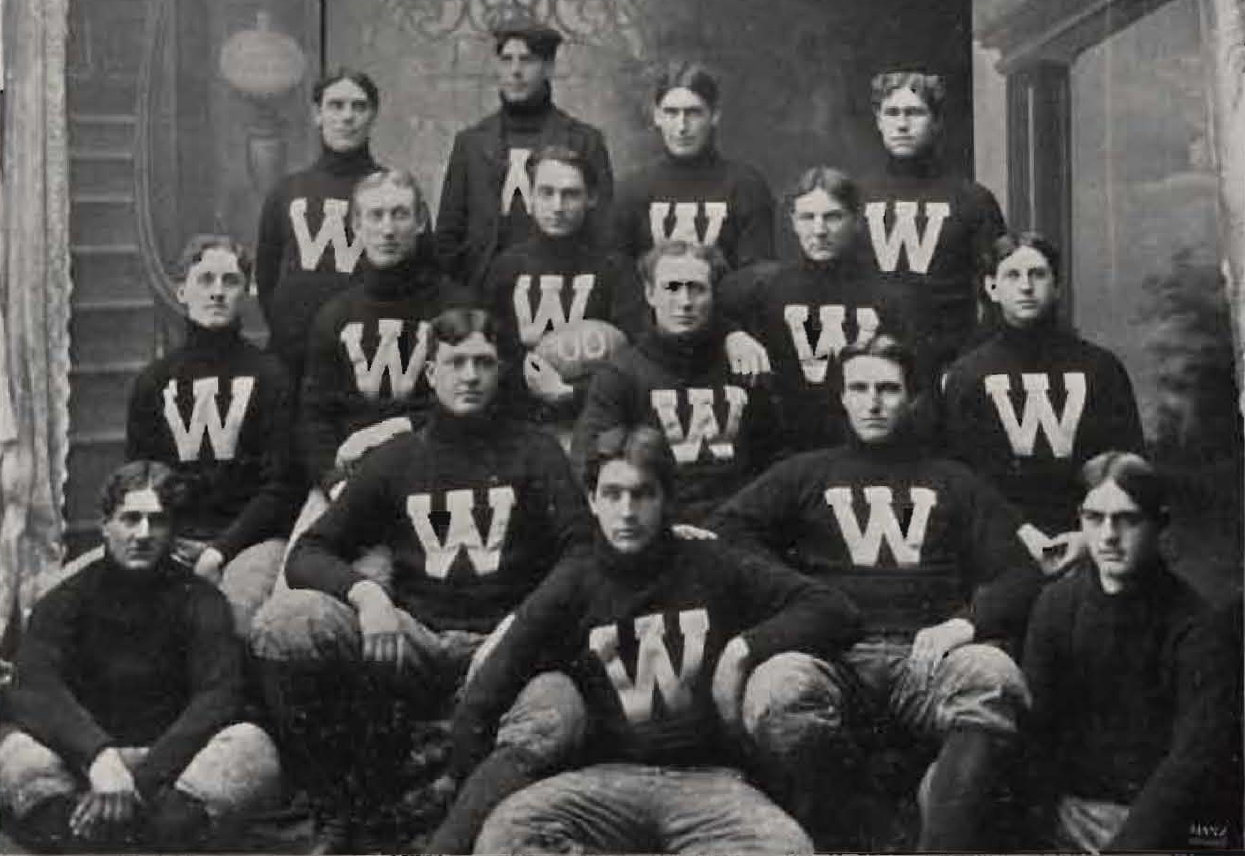
1900 W.A.C. football team, Allen at lower right

After graduating from Michigan, Allen was hired as the head football coach at Washington Agricultural College (now Washington State University) in Pullman, Washington. He led the team to an undefeated record of 4–0–1 in the 1900 college football season. In his first four games as the head coach, Allen's team won shut out victories over L.A.A.C. (2–0 on October 13, 1900 at Lewiston), S.A.A.C. (6–0 on October 20, 1900 at Pullman), W.W.A.C. (5–0 on November 10 at Walla Walla), and S.A.A.C. (21–0 on November 24 at Spokane). The season ended with a 5–5 tie in a Thanksgiving Day game with the University of Washington in Seattle. The 1902 Washington Agricultural yearbook, the Chinook, noted: "The football teams during the season just past have, for the first time in the history of athletics at the W. A. C., had the assistance of a coach. W. L. Allen, a graduate of the University of Michigan, was procured by the Athletic Association to coach the men; he was very successful and has built a strong foundation for our future in football." He returned to coach the team in 1902 and compiled an overall record of 6–3–1.

== Later years ==
By 1902, Allen had moved to Seattle, Washington. He died in May 1907 at Las Vegas, New Mexico, and was buried at Cherokee, Iowa.

== Head coaching record ==
Year	Team	Overall	Conference	Standing	Bowl/playoffs
Washington Agricultural (Independent) (1900)
1900	Washington Agricultural	4–0–1			
Washington Agricultural (Independent) (1902)
1902	Washington Agricultural	2–3			
Washington Agricultural:		6–3–1			
Total:		6–3–1			
