= Northwest Intercollegiate Athletic Association =

College athletic conference in the Pacific Northwest of the United States

- Founded: October 11, 1902
- Replaced by: Northwest Conference
- Region: Pacific Northwest

The Northwest Intercollegiate Athletic Association (NIAA) was an early collegiate athletic conference with member schools located in the Pacific Northwest of the United States.

== History ==
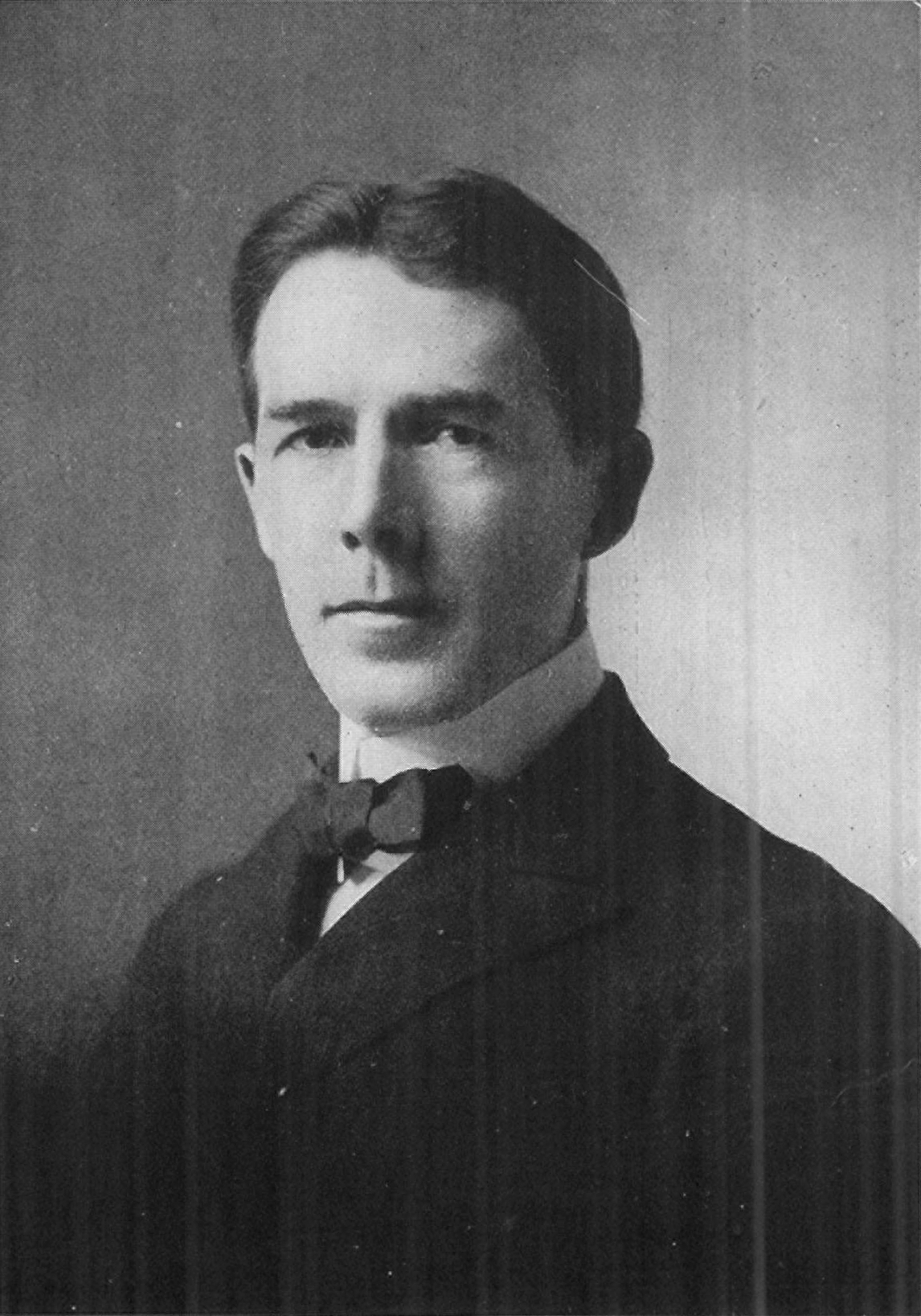
Thomas Franklin Kane, president of the University of Washington, was named the temporary chair of the NIAA at its founding meeting in 1902.

The Northwest Intercollegiate Athletic Association was established at a conference held in Spokane, Washington on October 11, 1902. Delegates from eight leading colleges of the Pacific Northwest region, including three university presidents, gathered in the directors' rooms of the Spokane Athletic Club and resolved to establish a new governing body for intercollegiate athletic competition. One of the schools present at the founding session, Pacific University, ultimately decided not to affiliate with the new group.

The University of Oregon was not represented by a delegate at the October 11 foundation meeting but voted to join in December 1902, bringing the total to eight institutions in the new federation.

The new body was designed to establish uniform eligibility rules for college athletics, to resolve such disputes as may emerge, and to schedule competitions between member schools in both athletics and debate. Thomas Franklin Kane, president of the University of Washington, was chosen as temporary chair of the new body, with mathematics professor J. E. Bonebright of the University of Idaho provisionally named as secretary. The gathering decided that governance should be through a board elected by the member institutions, with each school electing one member to the board — either a student, faculty member, or alumnus.

The Association took a strong position against professionalism, declaring that only bona fide students of true amateur status should be entitled to participate in intercollegiate competition. It was hoped that this would bring to an end the use of infiltrating skilled ringers into collegiate competition, a practice already recognized to be a bane upon college sports. Sports championships were to be arranged by the governing board.

At the NIAA's 1903 annual meeting, held in Moscow, Idaho on Saturday, June 6, J.E. Bonebright was elected president of the association for the coming year, with a new secretary tapped from Oregon Agricultural College. The 1903 conclave announced the scheduling of a massive regional track and field meet, to be held in Walla Walla, Washington on the campus of Whitman College, including participants from ten schools.

By the summer of 1905, the University of Oregon had left the Northwest Conference, with other members divided over the issue of whether athletes could earn tuition money playing baseball for pay during the summer months.

The Association seems to have attenuated in strength and influence, with the Spokane Chronicle observing in November 1905 that "there has been considerable talk about the Northwest Intercollegiate Association being a dead one, but the various college games this season would indicate that it is still very much alive..."

== Member institutions ==
The Northwest Intercollegiate Athletic Association was formed on October 11, 1902, by the colleges and universities of Idaho, Montana, Montana Agricultural, Washington, Washington Agricultural, Oregon Agricultural, and Whitman. The University of Oregon was not represented at the initial meeting, but joined soon after in December 1902. Although a representative for Pacific University was present at the initial formation of the organization, they did not join the league.

== Yearly football standings ==
1902 Northwest Intercollegiate Athletic Association football standings
	Conf.					Overall
Team	W		L		T	W		L		T
Washington $	4	–	0	–	0	5	–	1	–	0
Oregon	1	–	0	–	1	3	–	1	–	3
Washington State	2	–	1	–	0	2	–	3	–	0
Oregon Agricultural	0	–	1	–	1	4	–	1	–	1
Whitman	1	–	3	–	0	2	–	4	–	0
Idaho	0	–	3	–	0	1	–	3	–	1
$ – Conference champion

1903 Northwest Intercollegiate Athletic Association football standings
	Conf.					Overall
Team	W		L		T	W		L		T
Washington $	5	–	0	–	0	6	–	1	–	0
Montana Agricultural	1	–	0	–	0	1	–	0	–	1
Idaho	3	–	1	–	0	4	–	2	–	0
Oregon	1	–	1	–	1	4	–	2	–	1
Oregon Agricultural	1	–	2	–	1	2	–	4	–	1
Washington State	2	–	3	–	1	3	–	3	–	2
Montana	0	–	3	–	0	2	–	5	–	0
Pacific	—	–	—	–	—	—	–	—	–	—
Whitman	—	–	—	–	—	—	–	—	–	—
$ – Conference champion
