= Marion Dolph =

American football player and coach (1880–1921)

Biographical details
- Born: July 7, 1879; Portland, Oregon, U.S.
- Died: November 11, 1921 (aged 42); Portland, Oregon, U.S.

Playing career

Football
- 1897–1900: Williams

Coaching career (HC unless noted)

Football
- 1902: Oregon

Head coaching record
- Overall: 3–1–3

Marion Francis Dolph (July 7, 1880 – November 11, 1921) was an American college football player and coach. Dolph was a college football star at Williams College and the son of United States Senator Joseph N. Dolph. He served as the head football coach at the University of Oregon in 1902, compiling a record of 3–1–3.

== Head coaching record ==
Year	Team	Overall	Conference	Standing	Bowl/playoffs
Oregon Webfoots (Independent) (1902)
1902	Oregon	3–1–3			
Oregon:		3–1–3			
Total:		3–1–3			
