= William M. Ruthrauff =

American football player and coach (1884–1969)

Biographical details
- Born: February 24, 1884; Constantine, Michigan, U.S.
- Died: August 5, 1969 (aged 85); Philadelphia, Pennsylvania, U.S.

Playing career
- 1898: Carthage

Coaching career (HC unless noted)
- 1905: Arizona

Head coaching record
- Overall: 5–2

William Morrison Ruthrauff (February 24, 1884 – August 5, 1969) was an American college football player and coach. He served as the fifth head football coach at the University of Arizona, coaching for one season in 1905 and compiling a record of 5–2.

== Head coaching record ==
Year	Team	Overall	Conference	Standing	Bowl/playoffs
Arizona (Independent) (1905)
1905	Arizona	5–2			
Arizona:		5–2			
Total:		5–2			
