= Orin A. Kates =

American college sports coach and administrator (1883–1947)

Biographical details
- Born: November 18, 1883; Ord, Nebraska, U.S.
- Died: January 31, 1947 (aged 63); Alma, Michigan, U.S.

Coaching career (HC unless noted)

Football
- 1903–1904: Arizona

Basketball
- 1904–1906: Arizona

Administrative career (AD unless noted)
- 1904–1912: Arizona

Head coaching record
- Overall: 5–1–2 (football); 1–0–1 (basketball)

Orin Albert Kates (November 18, 1883 – January 31, 1947) was an American football and basketball coach and college athletics administrator. He served as the fourth head football coach at the University of Arizona, coaching one season in 1904 and compiling a record of 3–1–2. Kates was also the first head basketball coach at Arizona, coaching two seasons from 1904 to 1906 and tallying a mark of 1–0–1. In addition he served as the school's first athletic director, from 1904 to 1912.

== Head coaching record ==
=== Football ===
Year	Team	Overall	Conference	Standing	Bowl/playoffs
Arizona (Independent) (1903–1904)
1903	Arizona	2–0			
1904	Arizona	3–1–2			
Arizona:		5–1–2			
Total:		5–1–2			
