= Leslie Gillett =

American football player and coach (1881–1969)

Biographical details
- Born: February 15, 1881; Iowa, U.S.
- Died: February 20, 1969 (aged 88); Santa Fe, New Mexico, U.S.

Playing career
- 1900–1902: Arizona

Coaching career (HC unless noted)
- 1902: Arizona

Head coaching record
- Overall: 5–0

Leslie Alexander Gillett (February 15, 1881 – February 20, 1969) was an American college football coach. He served as the third head football coach at the University of Arizona, coaching for one season in 1902 and compiling a record of 5–0. He was later chief highway engineer of New Mexico from 1918 to 1922.

== Head coaching record ==
Year	Team	Overall	Conference	Standing	Bowl/playoffs
Arizona (Independent) (1902)
1902	Arizona	5–0			
Arizona:		5–0			
Total:		5–0			
