= Orian Landreth =

American football coach (1904–1996)

- Landreth pictured in Desert 1939, Arizona yearbook

Biographical details
- Born: June 21, 1904; Kansas, U.S.
- Died: October 20, 1996 (aged 92); Salinas, California, U.S.

Coaching career (HC unless noted)
- 1920s–1937: Long Beach Poly HS (CA)
- 1938: Arizona
- 1939: Long Beach

Head coaching record
- Overall: 3–6 (college)

Orian M. "Toad" Landreth (June 21, 1904 – October 20, 1996) was an American football coach. He was the head football coach at the University of Arizona in 1938, compiling a record of 3–6.

== Head coaching record ==
=== College ===
Year	Team	Overall	Conference	Standing	Bowl/playoffs
Arizona Wildcats (Border Conference) (1938)
1938	Arizona	3–6	0–3	6th	
Arizona:		3–6	0–3		
Total:		3–6			
