= H. B. Galbraith =

American football coach

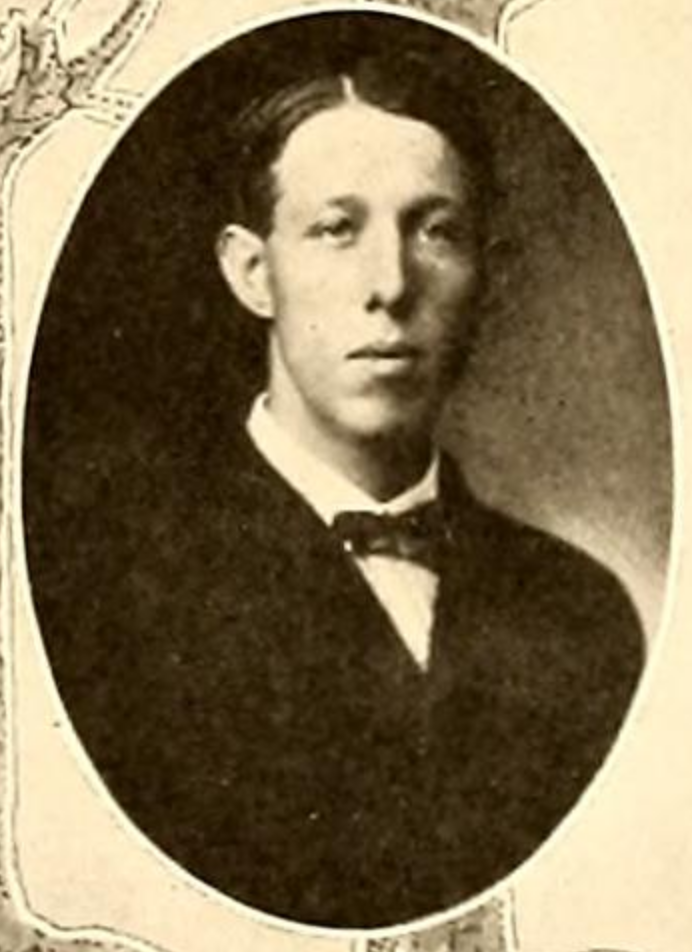
- Galbraith pictured in Forester 1909, Lake Forest yearbook

Biographical details
- Born: December 23, 1883; Altoona, Pennsylvania, U.S.
- Died: August 13, 1947 (aged 63); Brownsville, Texas, U.S.
- Education: Susquehanna University; Gettysburg College; Butler University; Lake Forest College (1908); Harvard University

Coaching career (HC unless noted)
- c. 1907: Carlisle (assistant)
- 1908–1909: Arizona

Head coaching record
- Overall: 8–1

Humes Bradley Galbraith (December 23, 1883 – August 13, 1947) was an American college football coach. He served as the sixth head football coach at the University of Arizona, coaching for two seasons, 1908 and 1909, and compiling a record of 8–1.

== Head coaching record ==
Year	Team	Overall	Conference	Standing	Bowl/playoffs
Arizona (Independent) (1908–1909)
1908	Arizona	5–0			
1909	Arizona	3–1			
Arizona:		8–1			
Total:		8–1			
