= 1902 Stanford football team =

American college football season

1902 Stanford football
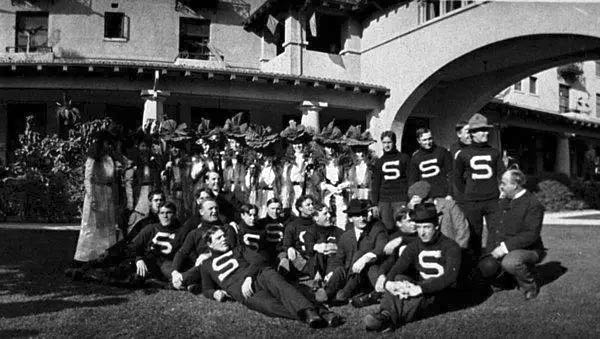
- Conference: Independent
- Record: 6–1
- Head coach: Carl L. Clemans (1st season)

1902 Far West college football independents records
	Conf.			Overall
Team	W	L	T	W		L		T
California		–		8	–	0	–	0
Arizona		–		5	–	0	–	0
Wyoming		–		1	–	0	–	0
Montana Agricultural		–		4	–	0	–	1
Stanford		–		6	–	1	–	0
Utah		–		5	–	2	–	1
Tempe Normal		–		2	–	1	–	0
USC		–		2	–	3	–	0
Idaho		–		1	–	3	–	1
Nevada State		–		1	–	2	–	0
New Mexico A&M		–		0	–	1	–	2
Utah Agricultural		–		0	–	5	–	1
Montana		–		0	–	2	–	0

The 1902 Stanford football team represented Stanford University in the 1902 college football season and was coached by Carl L. "Clem" Clemans in his only season coaching the team. Clemans played for Stanford's first football teams and was the team's first captain. He scored the first two touchdowns in the first Big Game against California.

== Schedule ==
Date	Time	Opponent	Site	Result	Attendance	Source
September 27		Reliance Athletic Club	Stanford, CA	W 12–0		
October 4		Stanford alumni	Stanford, CA	W 18–0		
October 11		Reliance Athletic Club	Stanford, CA	W 12–0		
October 27		Nevada State	Stanford, CA	W 11–5		
November 1		Reliance Athletic Club	Stanford, CA	W 23–5		
November 8		vs. California	Richmond Grounds; San Francisco, CA (Big Game)	L 0–16		
November 27	1:00 p.m.	at Utah	Varsity gridiron; Salt Lake City, UT	W 35–11	1,500	
All times are in Pacific time

== Game summaries ==
=== California ===
The Big Game against rival California had been played at five different fields around San Francisco since the first game in 1892. The field used for the previous three games, at 16th and Folsom Streets, had been sold and no new field was immediately identified. A site at a former Jewish cemetery at 18th and Dolores was identified and construction of bleachers began, but at the last moment, one of the organizations that owned the land backed out of the deal. Just a month before the game was to be played, another site was found in the Richmond District and a field and bleachers were hastily constructed. In the game, Stanford was shut out 16–0, the team's only loss of the season. The 1903 game was also played on this field, and then, beginning with the 1904 Big Game, the game was alternated between the home field of each team.
