= 1902 Nevada State Sagebrushers football team =

American college football season

1902 Nevada State Sagebrushers football
- Conference: Independent
- Record: 1–2
- Head coach: Allen Steckle (2nd season)
- Home stadium: Evans Field

1902 Far West college football independents records
	Conf.			Overall
Team	W	L	T	W		L		T
California		–		8	–	0	–	0
Arizona		–		5	–	0	–	0
Wyoming		–		1	–	0	–	0
Montana Agricultural		–		4	–	0	–	1
Stanford		–		6	–	1	–	0
Utah		–		5	–	2	–	1
Tempe Normal		–		2	–	1	–	0
USC		–		2	–	3	–	0
Idaho		–		1	–	3	–	1
Nevada State		–		1	–	2	–	0
New Mexico A&M		–		0	–	1	–	2
Utah Agricultural		–		0	–	5	–	1
Montana		–		0	–	2	–	0

The 1902 Nevada State Sagebrushers football team was an American football team that represented Nevada State University (now known as the University of Nevada, Reno) as an independent during the 1902 college football season. In its second season under head coach Allen Steckle, the team compiled a 1–2 record. W. A. "Art" Keddie and B.B. Smith were assistant coaches.

== Schedule ==
Date	Opponent	Site	Result	Source
October 19	Reliance Athletic Club	Evans Field; Reno, NV	W 16–0	
October 25	at Stanford	Stanford, CA	L 5–11	
November 1	at California	Berkeley, CA	L 0–29	
