= 1902 California Golden Bears football team =

American college football season

1902 California Golden Bears football
- Conference: Independent
- Record: 8–0
- Head coach: James Whipple (1st season)
- Captain: William B. Albertson

1902 Far West college football independents records
	Conf.			Overall
Team	W	L	T	W		L		T
California		–		8	–	0	–	0
Arizona		–		5	–	0	–	0
Wyoming		–		1	–	0	–	0
Montana Agricultural		–		4	–	0	–	1
Stanford		–		6	–	1	–	0
Utah		–		5	–	2	–	1
Tempe Normal		–		2	–	1	–	0
USC		–		2	–	3	–	0
Idaho		–		1	–	3	–	1
Nevada State		–		1	–	2	–	0
New Mexico A&M		–		0	–	1	–	2
Utah Agricultural		–		0	–	5	–	1
Montana		–		0	–	2	–	0

The 1902 California Golden Bears football team was an American football team that represented the University of California, Berkeley during the 1902 college football season. The team competed as an independent under head coach James Whipple and compiled a record of 8–0.

== Schedule ==
Date	Opponent	Site	Result	Attendance	Source
September 27	Alumni Club	Berkeley, CA	W 12–0		
October 4	Reliance Athletic Club	Berkeley, CA	W 16–0		
October 11	Reliance Athletic Club	Berkeley, CA	W 44–0		
October 25	Reliance Athletic Club	Berkeley, CA	W 17–0		
October 28	'98–'99 Alumni Club	Berkeley, CA	W 5–0		
November 1	Nevada State	Berkeley, CA	W 29–0		
November 8	vs. Stanford	Recreation Park; San Francisco, CA (Big Game)	W 16–0	20,000	
November 28	at Perris Indians	Perris Indian School; Riverside, CA	W 29–12		
