= 1902 University of Utah football team =

American college football season

1902 University of Utah football
- Conference: Independent
- Record: 5–2–1
- Head coach: Harvey Holmes (3rd season)

1902 Far West college football independents records
	Conf.			Overall
Team	W	L	T	W		L		T
California		–		8	–	0	–	0
Arizona		–		5	–	0	–	0
Wyoming		–		1	–	0	–	0
Montana Agricultural		–		4	–	0	–	1
Stanford		–		6	–	1	–	0
Utah		–		5	–	2	–	1
Tempe Normal		–		2	–	1	–	0
USC		–		2	–	3	–	0
Idaho		–		1	–	3	–	1
Nevada State		–		1	–	2	–	0
New Mexico A&M		–		0	–	1	–	2
Utah Agricultural		–		0	–	5	–	1
Montana		–		0	–	2	–	0

The 1902 University of Utah football team was an American football team that represented the University of Utah as an independent during the 1902 college football season. Head coach Harvey Holmes led the team to a 5–2–1 record.

== Schedule ==
Date	Time	Opponent	Site	Result	Attendance	Source
September 26		at Fort Douglas	Fort Douglas gridiron; Salt Lake City, UT	W 5–0		
October 4	3:23 p.m.	at Ogden High School	Glenwood Field; Ogden, UT	W 29–5		
October 11		Salt Lake High School	Salt Lake City, UT	W 41–0		
October 18	3:00 p.m.	Fort Douglas	University grounds; Salt Lake City, UT	W 35–0		
October 25	3:30 p.m.	Colorado Agricultural	University grounds; Salt Lake City, UT	T 0–0	3,000	
November 1	3:34 p.m.	Utah National Guard	Salt Lake City, UT	L 0–11	2,000	
November 15	3:00 p.m.	Utah Agricultural	Varsity campus; Salt Lake City, UT (rivalry)	W 18–0		
November 27	2:00 p.m.	Stanford	Varsity gridiron; Salt Lake City, UT	L 11–35	1,500	
