= 1902 New Mexico A&M Aggies football team =

American college football season

1902 New Mexico A&M Aggies football
- Conference: Independent
- Record: 0–1–2
- Head coach: John O. Miller (3rd season)
- Home stadium: College Field

1902 Far West college football independents records
	Conf.			Overall
Team	W	L	T	W		L		T
California		–		8	–	0	–	0
Arizona		–		5	–	0	–	0
Wyoming		–		1	–	0	–	0
Montana Agricultural		–		4	–	0	–	1
Stanford		–		6	–	1	–	0
Utah		–		5	–	2	–	1
Tempe Normal		–		2	–	1	–	0
USC		–		2	–	3	–	0
Idaho		–		1	–	3	–	1
Nevada State		–		1	–	2	–	0
New Mexico A&M		–		0	–	1	–	2
Utah Agricultural		–		0	–	5	–	1
Montana		–		0	–	2	–	0

The 1902 New Mexico A&M Aggies football team was an American football team that represented New Mexico College of Agriculture and Mechanical Arts (now known as New Mexico State University) as an independent during the 1902 college football season. In their third year under head coach John O. Miller, the Aggies compiled a 0–1–2 record and were outscored by a total of 6 to 0. The team played home games on College Field, later renamed Miller Field in honor of coach Miller.

== Schedule ==
Date	Opponent	Site	Result	Source
September 30	at Albuquerque Indian School	Albuquerque, New Mexico Territory	T 0–0	
	Santa Fe Indian School		T 0–0	
	Albuquerque Indian School		L 0–6	
