= 1902 Tempe Normal Owls football team =

American college football season

1902 Tempe Normal Owls football
- Conference: Independent
- Record: 2–1
- Head coach: Frederick M. Irish (4th season)
- Home stadium: Normal Field

1902 Far West college football independents records
	Conf.			Overall
Team	W	L	T	W		L		T
California		–		8	–	0	–	0
Arizona		–		5	–	0	–	0
Wyoming		–		1	–	0	–	0
Montana Agricultural		–		4	–	0	–	1
Stanford		–		6	–	1	–	0
Utah		–		5	–	2	–	1
Tempe Normal		–		2	–	1	–	0
USC		–		2	–	3	–	0
Idaho		–		1	–	3	–	1
Nevada State		–		1	–	2	–	0
New Mexico A&M		–		0	–	1	–	2
Utah Agricultural		–		0	–	5	–	1
Montana		–		0	–	2	–	0

The 1902 Tempe Normal Owls football team was an American football team that represented Tempe Normal School (later renamed Arizona State University) as an independent during the 1902 college football season. In their fourth season under head coach Frederick M. Irish, the Owls compiled a 2–1 record, shut out two opponents, and outscored their opponents by a combined total of 73 to 12. The team won games against the Phoenix High School (39–0) and the Phoenix Indians (34–0) and lost in the second Arizona–Arizona State football rivalry game (0–12).

== Schedule ==
Date	Opponent	Site	Result
	Phoenix High School	Normal Field; Tempe, Arizona Territory	W 39–0
	Phoenix Indian School	Normal Field; Tempe, Arizona Territory	W 34–0
November 22	at Arizona	Tucson, Arizona Territory	L 0–12
