= 1902 Wyoming Cowboys football team =

American college football season

1902 Wyoming Cowboys football
- Conference: Independent
- Record: 1–0
- Head coach: William McMurray (3rd season)
- Captain: None

1902 Far West college football independents records
	Conf.			Overall
Team	W	L	T	W		L		T
California		–		8	–	0	–	0
Arizona		–		5	–	0	–	0
Wyoming		–		1	–	0	–	0
Montana Agricultural		–		4	–	0	–	1
Stanford		–		6	–	1	–	0
Utah		–		5	–	2	–	1
Tempe Normal		–		2	–	1	–	0
USC		–		2	–	3	–	0
Idaho		–		1	–	3	–	1
Nevada State		–		1	–	2	–	0
New Mexico A&M		–		0	–	1	–	2
Utah Agricultural		–		0	–	5	–	1
Montana		–		0	–	2	–	0

The 1902 Wyoming Cowboys football team represented the University of Wyoming as an independent during the 1902 college football season. In its third season under head coach William McMurray, the team played only one game, defeating Cheyenne High School by an 18–0 score. There was no team captain.

== Schedule ==
Date	Opponent	Site	Result	Source
December 13	Cheyenne High School	Laramie, WY	W 18–0	
