= 1902 USC Methodists football team =

American college football season

1902 USC Methodists football
- Conference: Independent
- Record: 2–3
- Head coach: None
- Captain: Dan Caley
- Home stadium: Fiesta Park

1902 Far West college football independents records
	Conf.			Overall
Team	W	L	T	W		L		T
California		–		8	–	0	–	0
Arizona		–		5	–	0	–	0
Wyoming		–		1	–	0	–	0
Montana Agricultural		–		4	–	0	–	1
Stanford		–		6	–	1	–	0
Utah		–		5	–	2	–	1
Tempe Normal		–		2	–	1	–	0
USC		–		2	–	3	–	0
Idaho		–		1	–	3	–	1
Nevada State		–		1	–	2	–	0
New Mexico A&M		–		0	–	1	–	2
Utah Agricultural		–		0	–	5	–	1
Montana		–		0	–	2	–	0

The 1902 USC Methodists football team was an American football team that represented the University of Southern California during the 1902 college football season. The team competed as an independent without a head coach, compiling a 2–3 record.

== Schedule ==
Date	Opponent	Site	Result	Attendance
October 11	vs. St. Vincent's (CA)	Fiesta Park; Los Angeles, CA	L 5–6	400
October 25	at Santa Ana	Santa Ana, CA	L 2–5	
November 7	Santa Ana	Los Angeles, CA	W 6–0	
November 15	Pomona	Fiesta Park; Los Angeles, CA	W 16–5	
November 22	at Sherman Institute	Perris, CA	L 0–28	
