= 1902 Utah Agricultural Aggies football team =

American college football season

1902 Utah Agricultural Aggies football
- Conference: Independent
- Record: 0–5–1
- Head coach: George P. Campbell (1st season)
- Captain: Aquila Nebeker Jr.

1902 Far West college football independents records
	Conf.			Overall
Team	W	L	T	W		L		T
California		–		8	–	0	–	0
Arizona		–		5	–	0	–	0
Wyoming		–		1	–	0	–	0
Montana Agricultural		–		4	–	0	–	1
Stanford		–		6	–	1	–	0
Utah		–		5	–	2	–	1
Tempe Normal		–		2	–	1	–	0
USC		–		2	–	3	–	0
Idaho		–		1	–	3	–	1
Nevada State		–		1	–	2	–	0
New Mexico A&M		–		0	–	1	–	2
Utah Agricultural		–		0	–	5	–	1
Montana		–		0	–	2	–	0

The 1902 Utah Agricultural Aggies football team was an American football team that represented Utah Agricultural College (later renamed Utah State University) during the 1902 college football season. In their first season under head coach George P. Campbell, the Aggies compiled a 0–5–1. The team's captain was Aquila "Quill" Nebeker Jr.

== Schedule ==
Date	Time	Opponent	Site	Result	Attendance	Source
October 4		Salt Lake High School	Logan, UT	T 0–0		
October 11		Fort Douglas	Logan, UT	L 0–5		
October 18	4:00 p.m.	at Utah National Guard	Walker's Field; Salt Lake City, UT	L 0–21		
October 27		Colorado Agricultural	Logan, UT	L 5–24	600–800	
November 7		Fort Douglas	Logan, UT	L 5–10		
November 15	3:00 p.m.	at Utah	Varsity campus; Salt Lake City, UT (rivalry)	L 0–18		
All times are in Mountain time
