= 1902 Montana football team =

American college football season

1902 Montana football
- Conference: Independent
- Record: 0–2
- Head coach: Dewitt Peck (1st season)

1902 Far West college football independents records
	Conf.			Overall
Team	W	L	T	W		L		T
California		–		8	–	0	–	0
Arizona		–		5	–	0	–	0
Wyoming		–		1	–	0	–	0
Montana Agricultural		–		4	–	0	–	1
Stanford		–		6	–	1	–	0
Utah		–		5	–	2	–	1
Tempe Normal		–		2	–	1	–	0
USC		–		2	–	3	–	0
Idaho		–		1	–	3	–	1
Nevada State		–		1	–	2	–	0
New Mexico A&M		–		0	–	1	–	2
Utah Agricultural		–		0	–	5	–	1
Montana		–		0	–	2	–	0

The 1902 Montana football team represented the University of Montana in the 1902 college football season. They were led by first-year head coach Dewitt Peck, and finished the season with a record of zero wins and two losses (0–2).

== Schedule ==
Date	Opponent	Site	Result	Source
November 1	Montana Mines	Missoula, MT	L 0–16	
November 27	Montana Agricultural	University gridiron; Missoula, MT (rivalry)	L 0–38	
