= 1902 Arizona football team =

American college football season

1902 Arizona football

Arizona Territory champion
- Conference: Independent
- Record: 5–0
- Head coach: Leslie Gillett (1st season)
- Captain: Bard L. Cosgrove

1902 Far West college football independents records
	Conf.			Overall
Team	W	L	T	W		L		T
California		–		8	–	0	–	0
Arizona		–		5	–	0	–	0
Wyoming		–		1	–	0	–	0
Montana Agricultural		–		4	–	0	–	1
Stanford		–		6	–	1	–	0
Utah		–		5	–	2	–	1
Tempe Normal		–		2	–	1	–	0
USC		–		2	–	3	–	0
Idaho		–		1	–	3	–	1
Nevada State		–		1	–	2	–	0
New Mexico A&M		–		0	–	1	–	2
Utah Agricultural		–		0	–	5	–	1
Montana		–		0	–	2	–	0

The 1902 Arizona football team was an American football team that represented the University of Arizona as an independent during the 1902 college football season. In its first and only season under head coach Leslie Gillett, the team compiled a 5–0 record, did not allow a point to be scored against it, and outscored opponents by a total of 134 to 0. In the second meeting in the Arizona–Arizona State football rivalry, Arizona defeated the Tempe Normal School, 12 to 0. The team captain was Bard L. Cosgrove.

== Schedule ==
Date	Opponent	Site	Result	Source
November 1	Tucson Indian School	Tucson, Arizona Territory	W 17–0	
November 8	Tucson Indian School	Tucson, Arizona Territory	W 43–0	
November 15	Fort Grant	Tucson, Arizona Territory	W 28–0	
November 22	Tempe Normal	Tucson, Arizona Territory	W 12–0	
November 27	at Ft. Huachuca	Naco, Arizona Territory	W 34–0	
