= 1908 Cheney Normal football team =

American college football season

1908 Cheney Normal football
- Conference: Independent
- Record: 2–3
- Head coach: Nick E. Hinch (1st season)

1908 Western college football independents records
	Conf.			Overall
Team	W	L	T	W		L		T
Arizona		–		5	–	0	–	0
New Mexico		–		5	–	1	–	0
Montana Agricultural		–		3	–	1	–	2
USC		–		3	–	1	–	1
New Mexico A&M		–		4	–	2	–	0
Utah Agricultural		–		4	–	2	–	0
Utah		–		4	–	2	–	1
Cheney Normal		–		2	–	3	–	0
Montana		–		1	–	3	–	1
Wyoming		–		1	–	2	–	0

The 1908 Cheney Normal football team represented the State Normal School at Cheney—now known as Eastern Washington University—as an independent during the 1908 college football season. Led by Nick E. Hinch in his first season as head coach, Cheney Normal compiled a record of 2–3.

== Schedule ==
Date	Opponent	Site	Result	Source
October 3	at Spokane YMCA	Spokane, WA	W 4–0	
October 10	at Washington State	Rogers Field; Pullman, WA	L 0–73	
October 17	Blair Business	Cheney, WA	L 0–5	
October 22	at Gonzaga	Natatorium Park; Spokane, WA	L 0–17	
October 30	North Stars	Spokane, WA	W 84–0	
