= Montana Agricultural football, 1900–1909 =

American college football seasons

The Montana Agricultural football teams (later known as the Montana State Bobcats) represented the Agricultural College of the State of Montana (now known as Montana State University) in college football from 1900 to 1909.

== 1900 ==
1900 Montana Agricultural football
- Conference: Independent
- Record: 2–1
- Head coach: Eugene C. Woodruf (1st season)
- Home stadium: Butler Field

1900 Far West college football independents records
	Conf.			Overall
Team	W	L	T	W		L		T
Washington Agricultural		–		4	–	0	–	1
Idaho		–		2	–	0	–	1
Arizona		–		3	–	1	–	0
Montana Agricultural		–		2	–	1	–	0
Stanford		–		7	–	2	–	1
Utah		–		2	–	1	–	0
California		–		4	–	2	–	1
Nevada State		–		4	–	2	–	1
Oregon		–		3	–	3	–	1
New Mexico A&M		–		3	–	3	–	1
San Jose Normal		–		3	–	3	–	1
Arizona Normal		–		1	–	1	–	0
USC		–		1	–	1	–	1
Wyoming		–		3	–	3	–	0
Washington		–		1	–	2	–	2
Montana		–		0	–	1	–	0
Utah Agricultural		–		0	–	2	–	0

The 1900 Montana Agricultural football team was an American football team that represented the Agricultural College of the State of Montana (later renamed Montana State University) during the 1900 college football season. Led by Eugene C. Woodruf in his only season as head coach, they had a 2–1 record.

=== Schedule ===
Date	Opponent	Site	Result	Attendance	Source
November 3	at Butte High School	Athletic Park; Butte, MT	L 0–5	300–400	
November 24	Butte High School	Butler Field; Bozeman, MT	W 6–0		
November 29	at Montana	Missoula, MT (rivalry)	W 12–11		

== 1901 ==
1901 Montana Agricultural football
- Conference: Independent
- Record: 2–1
- Head coach: A. G. Harbaugh (1st season)
- Home stadium: College Field

1901 Far West college football independents records
	Conf.			Overall
Team	W	L	T	W		L		T
Wyoming		–		1	–	0	–	0
California		–		9	–	0	–	1
Arizona		–		4	–	1	–	0
Washington Agricultural		–		4	–	1	–	0
Utah		–		3	–	1	–	0
Montana Agricultural		–		2	–	1	–	0
New Mexico A&M		–		2	–	1	–	0
Utah Agricultural		–		3	–	2	–	0
Stanford		–		3	–	2	–	2
Idaho		–		3	–	2	–	1
Washington		–		3	–	3	–	0
Nevada State		–		3	–	3	–	0
Oregon		–		3	–	4	–	1
Montana		–		2	–	3	–	0
Cheney Normal		–		1	–	2	–	0
Oregon Agricultural		–		1	–	2	–	0
New Mexico		–		0	–	3	–	1
USC		–		0	–	2	–	0

The 1901 Montana Agricultural football team was an American football team that represented the Agricultural College of the State of Montana (later renamed Montana State University) during the 1901 college football season. In its first season under head coach A. G. Harbaugh, the team compiled a 2–1 record with victories over the University of Montana and Butte Business College. The team outscored opponents by a total of 42 to 23. Right guard Ervin was the team captain.

=== Schedule ===
Date	Opponent	Site	Result	Attendance	Source
October 19	at Butte Business College	Butte, MT	L 0–23		
November 16	Butte Business College	College Field; Bozeman, MT	W 11–0		
November 28	Montana	College Field; Bozeman, MT (rivalry)	W 31–0	2,000	

== 1902 ==
1902 Montana Agricultural football

Montana champion
- Conference: Independent
- Record: 4–0–1
- Head coach: J. E. Flynn (1st season)
- Home stadium: College Field

1902 Far West college football independents records
	Conf.			Overall
Team	W	L	T	W		L		T
California		–		8	–	0	–	0
Arizona		–		5	–	0	–	0
Wyoming		–		1	–	0	–	0
Montana Agricultural		–		4	–	0	–	1
Stanford		–		6	–	1	–	0
Utah		–		5	–	2	–	1
Tempe Normal		–		2	–	1	–	0
Cheney Normal		–		2	–	1	–	2
USC		–		2	–	3	–	0
Idaho		–		1	–	3	–	1
Nevada State		–		1	–	2	–	0
New Mexico A&M		–		0	–	1	–	2
Utah Agricultural		–		0	–	5	–	1
Montana		–		0	–	2	–	0

The 1902 Montana Agricultural football team was an American football team that represented the Agricultural College of the State of Montana (later renamed Montana State University) during the 1902 college football season. In its first season under head coach J. E. Flynn, the team compiled a 4–0–1 record and outscored opponents by a total of 94 to 22. With two victories over the Montana School of Mines and a 38–0 victory on Thanksgiving Day over the University of Montana, the Agricultural College was declared to be the champion of Montana.

=== Schedule ===
Date	Opponent	Site	Result	Source
October 18	Montana Mines	College Field; Bozeman, MT	W 21–6	
November 1	at Broadway Athletic Club (Butte)	Columbia Gardens; Butte, MT	T 5–5	
November 8	Broadway Athletic Club (Butte)	College Field; Bozeman, MT	W 15–0	
November 15	Montana Mines	College Field; Bozeman, MT	W 15–11	
November 27	at Montana	Missoula, MT (rivalry)	W 38–0	

== 1903 ==
1903 Montana Agricultural football
- Conference: Independent
- Record: 1–0–1
- Head coach: J. E. Flynn (2nd season)
- Home stadium: Fairgrounds

1903 Far West college football independents records
	Conf.			Overall
Team	W	L	T	W		L		T
Stanford		–		8	–	0	–	3
Montana Agricultural		–		1	–	0	–	1
California		–		6	–	1	–	2
Washington		–		6	–	1	–	0
Oregon		–		4	–	2	–	1
USC		–		4	–	2	–	0
Albany College (OR)		–		4	–	3	–	0
Utah Agricultural		–		3	–	0	–	0
New Mexico A&M		–		2	–	0	–	1
Arizona		–		2	–	0	–	0
Tempe Normal		–		2	–	0	–	0
Idaho		–		4	–	2	–	0
Wyoming		–		3	–	2	–	0
Washington Agricultural		–		3	–	3	–	2
Utah		–		3	–	5	–	0
Nevada State		–		2	–	4	–	2
Oregon Agricultural		–		2	–	4	–	1
Montana		–		2	–	5	–	0
Academy of Idaho		–		0	–	1	–	1

The 1903 Montana Agricultural football team was an American football team that represented the Agricultural College of the State of Montana (later renamed Montana State University) during the 1903 college football season. Led by J. E. Flynn his second season as head coach, they had a 1–0–1 record.

=== Schedule ===
Date	Opponent	Site	Result	Source
October 31	Montana Mines	Fairgrounds; Bozeman, MT	T 0–0	
November 26	Montana	Fairgrounds; Bozeman, MT (rivalry)	W 15–6	

== 1904 ==
1904 Montana Agricultural football
- Conference: Independent
- Record: 2–1
- Head coach: Fred Ervin (1st season)
- Home stadium: College Field

1904 Far West college football independents records
	Conf.			Overall
Team	W	L	T	W		L		T
Utah		–		7	–	1	–	0
Stanford		–		7	–	2	–	1
California		–		6	–	1	–	1
USC		–		6	–	1	–	0
Idaho		–		2	–	1	–	0
Montana Agricultural		–		2	–	1	–	0
Oregon		–		5	–	3	–	0
Tempe Normal		–		4	–	0	–	0
Wyoming		–		4	–	1	–	1
Washington		–		4	–	2	–	1
Arizona		–		3	–	1	–	2
Oregon Agricultural		–		4	–	2	–	0
Montana		–		3	–	2	–	0
Nevada State		–		3	–	3	–	0
Washington Agricultural		–		2	–	2	–	0
New Mexico A&M		–		1	–	2	–	1
Utah Agricultural		–		4	–	8	–	0

The 1904 Montana Agricultural football team was an American football team that represented the Agricultural College of the State of Montana (later renamed Montana State University) during the 1904 college football season. Led by Fred Ervin his first season as head coach, they had a 2–1 record.

=== Schedule ===
Date	Opponent	Site	Result	Source
October 30	Billings High School	College Field; Bozeman, MT	W 30–4	
November 19	College of Montana	College Field; Bozeman, MT	W 41–6	
November 24	at Montana	Missoula, MT (rivalry)	L 0–79	

== 1905 ==
1905 Montana Agricultural football
- Conference: Independent
- Record: 1–2–1
- Head coach: A. G. Harbaugh (2nd season)
- Home stadium: College Field

1905 Far West college football independents records
	Conf.			Overall
Team	W	L	T	W		L		T
Stanford		–		8	–	0	–	0
Idaho		–		5	–	0	–	0
New Mexico A&M		–		3	–	0	–	0
Colorado		–		8	–	1	–	0
New Mexico		–		5	–	1	–	1
Utah		–		6	–	2	–	0
California		–		4	–	1	–	2
Oregon Agricultural		–		6	–	3	–	0
USC		–		6	–	3	–	1
Arizona		–		4	–	2	–	0
Oregon		–		4	–	2	–	2
Washington		–		4	–	2	–	2
Washington State		–		4	–	4	–	0
Utah Agricultural		–		2	–	2	–	1
Wyoming		–		3	–	4	–	0
Montana		–		2	–	3	–	0
Montana Agricultural		–		1	–	2	–	1
Nevada State		–		0	–	3	–	1
Colorado State Normal		–		0	–	2	–	0
Tempe Normal		–		0	–	3	–	0

The 1905 Montana Agricultural football team was an American football team that represented the Agricultural College of the State of Montana (later renamed Montana State University) during the 1905 college football season. In its second non-consecutive season under head coach A. G. Harbaugh, the team compiled a 1–2–1 record and was outscored 98 to 45. The 1905 team was the first in the program to play opponents from outside Montana, facing teams from the University of Idaho, Washington State College, and Utah Agricultural College. Clinton Wylie was the team captain.

=== Schedule ===
Date	Opponent	Site	Result	Source
October 9	at Idaho	Moscow, ID	L 0–50	
October 11	at Washington State	Rogers Field; Pullman, WA	L 0–32	
October 31	Fort Shaw Indians	College Field; Bozeman, MT	W 40–11	
November 10	Utah Agricultural	College Field; Bozeman, MT	T 5–5	

== 1906–1907 ==
The Agricultural College of the State of Montana did not field teams for the 1906 or 1907 seasons.

== 1908 ==
1908 Montana Agricultural football
- Conference: Independent
- Record: 3–1–2
- Head coach: John H. McIntosh (1st season)
- Home stadium: Fairgrounds

1908 Western college football independents records
	Conf.			Overall
Team	W	L	T	W		L		T
Arizona		–		5	–	0	–	0
New Mexico		–		5	–	1	–	0
Montana Agricultural		–		3	–	1	–	2
USC		–		3	–	1	–	1
New Mexico A&M		–		4	–	2	–	0
Utah Agricultural		–		4	–	2	–	0
Utah		–		4	–	2	–	1
Cheney Normal		–		2	–	3	–	0
Montana		–		1	–	3	–	1
Wyoming		–		1	–	2	–	0

The 1908 Montana Agricultural football team was an American football team that represented the Agricultural College of the State of Montana (later renamed Montana State University) during the 1908 college football season. Led by John H. McIntosh his first season as head coach, they had a 3–1–2 record.

=== Schedule ===
Date	Opponent	Site	Result	Source
October 10	at Montana	Missoula, MT (rivalry)	T 0–0	
October 23	Fort Shaw Indians	Fairgrounds; Bozeman, MT	W 30–0	
October 31	Montana Mines	Fairgrounds; Bozeman, MT	T 0–0	
November 7	Gallatin County High School	Fairgrounds; Bozeman, MT	W 24–4	
November 14	at Montana Mines	Columbia Gardens; Butte, MT	L 5–22	
November 20	Montana	Fairgrounds; Bozeman, MT	W 5–0	

== 1909 ==
1909 Montana Agricultural football
- Conference: Independent
- Record: 0–6–1
- Head coach: John H. McIntosh (2nd season)
- Home stadium: Fairgrounds

1909 Western college football independents records
	Conf.			Overall
Team	W	L	T	W		L		T
St. Vincent's		–		6	–	0	–	0
Montana		–		6	–	0	–	1
Utah		–		4	–	1	–	0
Denver		–		7	–	2	–	0
Arizona		–		3	–	1	–	0
New Mexico		–		4	–	2	–	0
USC		–		3	–	1	–	2
Hawaii		–		2	–	2	–	0
Utah Agricultural		–		2	–	2	–	1
Wyoming		–		3	–	5	–	0
New Mexico A&M		–		1	–	3	–	1
Cheney Normal		–		0	–	2	–	0
Montana Agricultural		–		0	–	6	–	1

The 1909 Montana Agricultural football team was an American football team that represented the Agricultural College of the State of Montana (later renamed Montana State University) during the 1909 college football season. Led by John H. McIntosh his second season as head coach, they had a 0–6–1 record.

=== Schedule ===
Date	Opponent	Site	Result	Source
October 9	Butte High School	Fairgrounds; Bozeman, MT	L 0–5	
October 22	Montana	Fairgrounds; Bozeman, MT (rivalry)	L 0–3	
October 30	at Montana Mines	Columbia Gardens; Butte, MT	L 0–6	
November 6	Montana Mines	Fairgrounds; Bozeman, MT	L 6–10	
November 13	at Utah	Cummings Field; Salt Lake City, UT	L 0–46	
November 15	at Utah Agricultural	Logan, UT	T 0–0	
November 25	at Montana	Montana Field; Missoula, MT	L 5–15	
