= Coach Harbaugh =

Coach Harbaugh may refer to:

- A. G. Harbaugh (1872–1934), American college football coach for Montana Agricultural
- Greg Harbaugh Jr. (born 1986), American college football coach for Minnesota
- Jack Harbaugh (born 1939), American college head football coach for Western Michigan University and Western Kentucky University
  - John Harbaugh (born 1962), American NFL football coach for the Baltimore Ravens; Jack's older son
  - Jim Harbaugh (born 1963), American football coach for Stanford, San Francisco 49ers, Michigan, and the Los Angeles Chargers; Jack's younger son
    - Jay Harbaugh (born 1989), American college football coach for Michigan; Jim's son
