= 1900 University of Utah football team =

American college football season

1900 University of Utah football
- Conference: Independent
- Record: 2–1
- Head coach: Harvey Holmes (1st season)
- Home stadium: Walker's Field

1900 Far West college football independents records
	Conf.			Overall
Team	W	L	T	W		L		T
Washington Agricultural		–		4	–	0	–	1
Idaho		–		2	–	0	–	1
Arizona		–		3	–	1	–	0
Montana Agricultural		–		2	–	1	–	0
Stanford		–		7	–	2	–	1
Utah		–		2	–	1	–	0
California		–		4	–	2	–	1
Nevada State		–		4	–	2	–	1
Oregon		–		3	–	3	–	1
New Mexico A&M		–		3	–	3	–	1
San Jose Normal		–		3	–	3	–	1
Arizona Normal		–		1	–	1	–	0
USC		–		1	–	1	–	1
Wyoming		–		3	–	3	–	0
Washington		–		1	–	2	–	2
Montana		–		0	–	1	–	0
Utah Agricultural		–		0	–	2	–	0

The 1900 University of Utah football team was an American football team that represented the University of Utah as an independent during the 1900 college football season. Head coach Harvey Holmes led the team to a 2–1 record.

== Schedule ==
Date	Time	Opponent	Site	Result	Source
November 10	3:30 p.m.	All Hallows College	Walker's Field; Salt Lake City, UT	W 36–6	
November 17		at Utah Agricultural	Utah A.C. quad; Logan UT (rivalry)	W 21–0	
November 24		Salt Lake City YMCA	Walker's Field; Salt Lake City, UT	L 0–6	
