= 1900 New Mexico A&M Aggies football team =

American college football season

1900 New Mexico A&M Aggies football
- Conference: Independent
- Record: 3–3–1
- Head coach: William A. Sutherland (1st season)
- Home stadium: College Field

1900 Far West college football independents records
	Conf.			Overall
Team	W	L	T	W		L		T
Washington Agricultural		–		4	–	0	–	1
Idaho		–		2	–	0	–	1
Arizona		–		3	–	1	–	0
Montana Agricultural		–		2	–	1	–	0
Stanford		–		7	–	2	–	1
Utah		–		2	–	1	–	0
California		–		4	–	2	–	1
Nevada State		–		4	–	2	–	1
Oregon		–		3	–	3	–	1
New Mexico A&M		–		3	–	3	–	1
San Jose Normal		–		3	–	3	–	1
Arizona Normal		–		1	–	1	–	0
USC		–		1	–	1	–	1
Wyoming		–		3	–	3	–	0
Washington		–		1	–	2	–	2
Montana		–		0	–	1	–	0
Utah Agricultural		–		0	–	2	–	0

The 1900 New Mexico A&M Aggies football team was an American football team that represented New Mexico College of Agriculture and Mechanical Arts (now known as New Mexico State University) as an independent during the 1900 college football season. In their first and only year under head coach William A. Sutherland, the Aggies compiled a 3–3–1 record and outscored opponents by a total of 49 to 27.

== Schedule ==
Date	Opponent	Site	Result	Source
November 29	at New Mexico Normal	Las Vegas, New Mexico Territory	L 5–6	
December 1	Albuquerque Indian School	Mesilla Park, New Mexico Territory	L 0–11	
	Las Cruces		W 16–0	
	Las Cruces		W 6–0	
	Organ		W 22–5	
	at El Paso		L 0–5	
	at El Paso		T 0–0	
