= 1900 San Jose Normal football team =

American college football season

1900 San Jose Normal football
- Conference: Independent
- Record: 3–3–1
- Head coach: James E. Addicott, Whitemeger, Fielding H. Yost (1st season)
- Home stadium: Cyclers' Park

1900 Far West college football independents records
	Conf.			Overall
Team	W	L	T	W		L		T
Washington Agricultural		–		4	–	0	–	1
Idaho		–		2	–	0	–	1
Arizona		–		3	–	1	–	0
Montana Agricultural		–		2	–	1	–	0
Stanford		–		7	–	2	–	1
Utah		–		2	–	1	–	0
California		–		4	–	2	–	1
Nevada State		–		4	–	2	–	1
Oregon		–		3	–	3	–	1
New Mexico A&M		–		3	–	3	–	1
San Jose Normal		–		3	–	3	–	1
Arizona Normal		–		1	–	1	–	0
USC		–		1	–	1	–	1
Wyoming		–		3	–	3	–	0
Washington		–		1	–	2	–	2
Montana		–		0	–	1	–	0
Utah Agricultural		–		0	–	2	–	0

The 1900 San Jose Normal football team represented California State Normal School—now known as San Jose State University—as an independent during the 1900 college football season. The team was co-coached by three men: James E. Addicott, who was the first coach for the San Jose Normal back in 1895, coach Whitemeger, and one of the most well-known coaches of his era, Fielding H. Yost. This trio of leadership did not allow the San Jose Normal to repeat their record from the year before, compiling a mediocre record of 3–3–1, although for the first time all of the team's games were against collegiate opponents.

== Schedule ==
Date	Time	Opponent	Site	Result	Attendance	Source
October 10		Stanford	Cyclers' Park; San Jose, CA (rivalry)	L 0–35		
October 20		at Stanford	Stanford, CA	L 0–24		
November 3	2:00 p.m.	at Nevada	Reno, NV	T 0–0		
November 17		California B team	Cyclers' Park; San Jose, CA	W 6–0		
November 22		at California	Berkeley campus; Berkeley, CA	L 0–5		
November 29		at Chico Normal	Chico, CA	W 5–0	2,500	
December 8		Chico Normal	San Jose, CA	W 12–0		
