= 1900 Nevada State Sagebrushers football team =

American college football season

1900 Nevada State Sagebrushers football
- Conference: Independent
- Record: 4–2–1
- Head coach: James Hopper (1st season)
- Home stadium: Evans Field

1900 Far West college football independents records
| | Conf. | | | Overall |
| Team | W | L | T | W | | L | | T |
|---|---|---|---|---|---|---|---|---|
| Washington Agricultural | | – | | 4 | – | 0 | – | 1 |
| Idaho | | – | | 2 | – | 0 | – | 1 |
| Arizona | | – | | 3 | – | 1 | – | 0 |
| Montana Agricultural | | – | | 2 | – | 1 | – | 0 |
| Stanford | | – | | 7 | – | 2 | – | 1 |
| Utah | | – | | 2 | – | 1 | – | 0 |
| California | | – | | 4 | – | 2 | – | 1 |
| Nevada State | | – | | 4 | – | 2 | – | 1 |
| Oregon | | – | | 3 | – | 3 | – | 1 |
| New Mexico A&M | | – | | 3 | – | 3 | – | 1 |
| San Jose Normal | | – | | 3 | – | 3 | – | 1 |
| Arizona Normal | | – | | 1 | – | 1 | – | 0 |
| USC | | – | | 1 | – | 1 | – | 1 |
| Wyoming | | – | | 3 | – | 3 | – | 0 |
| Washington | | – | | 1 | – | 2 | – | 2 |
| Montana | | – | | 0 | – | 1 | – | 0 |
| Utah Agricultural | | – | | 0 | – | 2 | – | 0 |

The 1900 Nevada State Sagebrushers football team was an American football team that represented Nevada State University (now known as the University of Nevada, Reno) as an independent during the 1900 college football season. In its first and only season under head coach James Hopper, the team compiled a 4–2–1 record.

== Schedule ==
| Date | Time | Opponent | Site | Result | Source |
|---|---|---|---|---|---|
| October 13 | | Stewart Indian School (NV) | Evans Field; Reno, NV | W 39–0 | |
| October 18 | | Reliance Athletic Club | Evans Field; Reno, NV | W 16–0 | |
| October 27 | | at Reliance Athletic Club | San Francisco, CA | L 0–2 | |
| November 3 | 2:00 p.m. | San Jose Normal | Evans Field; Reno, NV | T 0–0 | |
| November 15 | | at California | Berkeley, CA | L 0–32 | |
| November 17 | | at Stanford | Stanford, CA | W 6–0 | |
| November 29 | | Reno Wheelmen | Evans Field; Reno, NV | W 17–0 | |
