= List of Washington Huskies head football coaches =

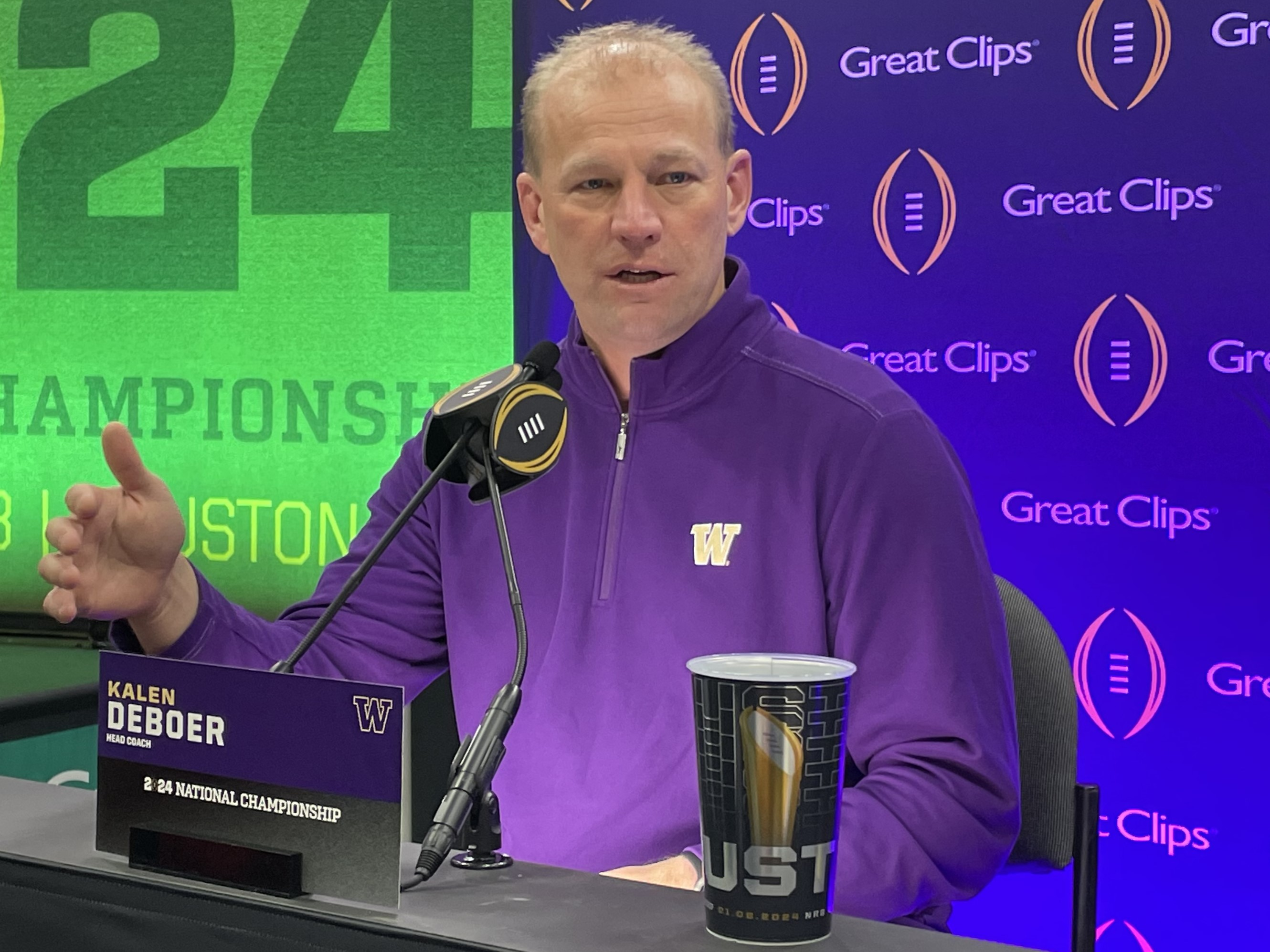
Kalen DeBoer served as the head coach of the Huskies from 2022 to 2023.

The Washington Huskies college football team represents the University of Washington in the North Division of the Pac-12 Conference (Pac-12). The Huskies compete as part of the National Collegiate Athletic Association (NCAA) Division I Football Bowl Subdivision. The program has had 31 head coaches since it began play during the 1889 season. Jedd Fisch is the current head coach.

The Huskies have played more than 1,100 games over 122 seasons. In that time, twelve coaches have led the Huskies in postseason bowl games: Enoch Bagshaw, James Phelan, Ralph Welch, Jim Owens, Don James, Jim Lambright, Rick Neuheisel, Steve Sarkisian, Marques Tuiasosopo, Chris Petersen, Kalen DeBoer, and Fisch. Eight of those coaches also won conference championships: Gil Dobie, Claude J. Hunt, Phelan and Bradshaw captured a combined four as a member of the Pacific Coast Conference and Owens, James, Lambright, and Neuheisel won a combined 11 as a member of the Pac-10. Don James won a national championship with the Huskies in 1991.

James is the leader in seasons coached and games won, with 153 victories during his 18 years with the program. Dobie, who was undefeated during his nine seasons with Washington, has the highest winning percentage of those who have coached more than one game at .975. Stub Allison has the lowest winning percentage of those who have coached more than three games, with .167. Of the 30 different head coaches who have led the Huskies, Dobie, Phelan, Darrell Royal, Owens, and James have been inducted into the College Football Hall of Fame in South Bend, Indiana.

== Key ==
Key to symbols in coaches list
General		Overall		Conference		Postseason (Note: Although the first Rose Bowl Game was played in 1902, it has been continuously played since the 1916 game, and is recognized as the oldest bowl game by the NCAA. "—" indicates any season prior to 1916 when postseason games were not played.)	
No.	Order of coaches (Note: A running total of the number of head coaches, with coaches who served separate tenures being counted only once. Interim head coaches are represented with "Int" and are not counted in the running total. "—" indicates the team played but either without a coach or no coach is on record. "X" indicates an interim year without play.)	GC	Games coached	CW	Conference wins	PW	Postseason wins
DC	Division championships	OW	Overall wins	CL	Conference losses	PL	Postseason losses
CC	Conference championships	OL	Overall losses	CT	Conference ties	PT	Postseason ties
NC	National championships	OT	Overall ties (Note: Overtime rules in college football were introduced in 1996, making ties impossible in the period since.)	C%	Conference winning percentage		
†	Elected to the College Football Hall of Fame	O%	Overall winning percentage (Note: When computing the win–loss percentage, a tie counts as half a win and half a loss.)				

== Coaches ==
List of head football coaches showing season(s) coached, overall records, conference records, postseason records, championships and selected awards. Results below: (Note: Statistics correct as of the end of the 2025 NCAA Division I FBS football season.)
No.	Name	Season(s)	GC	OW	OL	OT	O%	CW	CL	CT	C%	PW	PL	PT	DC (Note: Divisional champions advanced to the Pac-12 Football Championship Game during the 2011–2021 seasons. During those seasons, Washington competed as a member of the Pac-12 North.)	CC	NC	Awards
0	No coach	1889–1890	2	0	1	1	0.250	—	—	—	—	—	—	—	—	—	0	—
1	W. B. Goodwin	1892–1893	7	2	4	1	0.357	—	—	—	—	—	—	—	—	—	0	—
2	Charles Cobb	1894	3	1	1	1	0.500	—	—	—	—	—	—	—	—	—	0	—
3	Ralph Nichols	1895–1896; 1898	12	7	4	1	0.625	—	—	—	—	—	—	—	—	—	0	—
4	Carl L. Clemans	1897	3	1	2	0	0.333	—	—	—	—	—	—	—	—	—	0	—
5	A. S. Jeffs	1899	6	4	1	1	0.750	—	—	—	—	—	—	—	—	—	0	—
6	J. S. Dodge	1900	5	1	2	2	0.400	—	—	—	—	—	—	—	—	—	0	—
7	Jack Wright	1901	6	3	3	0	0.500	—	—	—	—	—	—	—	—	—	0	—
8	James Knight	1902–1904	20	15	4	1	0.775	—	—	—	—	—	—	—	—	—	0	—
9	Oliver Cutts	1905	9	5	2	2	0.667	—	—	—	—	—	—	—	—	—	0	—
10	Victor M. Place	1906–1907	19	8	5	6	0.579	—	—	—	—	—	—	—	—	—	0	—
11	Gil Dobie^{†}	1908–1916	61	58	0	3	0.975	3	0	0	1.000	0	0	0	—	1	0	—
12	Claude J. Hunt	1917; 1919	10	6	3	1	0.650	2	2	1	0.500	0	0	0	—	1	0	—
13	Tony Savage	1918	2	1	1	0	0.500	1	1	0	0.500	0	0	0	—	0	0	—
14	Stub Allison	1920	6	1	5	0	0.167	0	3	0	.000	0	0	0	—	0	0	—
15	Enoch Bagshaw	1921–1929	91	63	22	6	0.725	33	19	4	0.625	1	0	1	—	1	0	—
16	James Phelan^{†}	1930–1941	110	65	37	8	0.627	51	31	8	0.611	0	1	0	—	1	0	—
17	Ralph Welch	1942–1947	50	27	20	3	0.570	17	16	2	0.514	0	1	0	—	0	0	—
18	Howie Odell	1948–1952	50	23	25	2	0.480	17	18	2	0.486	0	0	0	—	0	0	—
19	John Cherberg	1953–1955	30	10	18	2	0.367	7	13	2	0.364	0	0	0	—	0	0	—
20	Darrell Royal^{†}	1956	10	5	5	0	0.500	4	4	0	0.500	0	0	0	—	0	0	—
21	Jim Owens^{†}	1957–1974	187	99	82	6	0.545	60	58	2	0.508	2	1	0	—	3	1 – 1960	UPI Pacific Coast Coach of the Year (1959, 1960)
22	Don James^{†}	1975–1992	212	153	57	2	0.726	98	37	2	0.723	10	4	0	—	6	1 – 1991	AFCA Coach of the Year (1977); Paul "Bear" Bryant Award (1991); FWAA Coach of the Year (1991); George Munger Award (1991); Sporting News College Football Coach of the Year (1991); Pac-10 Coach of the Year (1980, 1990, 1991)
23	Jim Lambright	1993–1998	70	44	25	1	0.636	31	16	1	0.656	1	3	0	—	1	0	—
24	Rick Neuheisel	1999–2002	49	33	16	—	0.673	23	9	—	0.719	1	3	—	—	1	0	—
25	Keith Gilbertson	2003–2004	23	7	16	—	0.304	4	12	—	0.250	0	0	—	—	0	0	—
26	Tyrone Willingham	2005–2008	48	11	37	—	0.229	6	29	—	0.171	0	0	—	—	0	0	—
27	Steve Sarkisian	2009–2013	63	34	29	—	0.540	24	21	—	0.533	1	2	—	0	0	0	—
Int	Marques Tuiasosopo	2013	1	1	0	—	1.000	—	—	—	—	1	0	—	—	—	—	—
28	Chris Petersen	2014–2019	81	55	26	—	0.679	34	20	—	0.630	2	4	—	3	2	0	—
29	Jimmy Lake	2020–2021	13	7	6	—	0.538	6	4	—	0.600	0	0	—	1	0	0	—
Int	Bob Gregory	2021	3	0	3	—	.000	0	3	—	.000	—	—	—	—	—	—	—
30	Kalen DeBoer	2022–2023	28	25	3	—	0.893	16	2	—	0.889	2	1	—	—	1	0	AFCA Coach of the Year (2023); AP Coach of the Year (2023); Eddie Robinson Coach of the Year (2023); George Munger Award (2023); Home Depot Coach of the Year (2023); Sporting News College Football Coach of the Year (2023); Pac-12 Coach of the Year (2022, 2023)
31	Jedd Fisch	2024–present	26	15	11	—	0.577	9	9	—	0.500	1	1	—	—	0	0	—
