= 1900 California Golden Bears football team =

American college football season

1900 California Golden Bears football
- Conference: Independent
- Record: 4–2–1
- Head coach: Addison Kelly (1st season)
- Captain: Charles A. Pringle

1900 Far West college football independents records
	Conf.			Overall
Team	W	L	T	W		L		T
Washington Agricultural		–		4	–	0	–	1
Idaho		–		2	–	0	–	1
Arizona		–		3	–	1	–	0
Stanford		–		7	–	2	–	1
Utah		–		2	–	1	–	0
California		–		4	–	2	–	1
Nevada State		–		4	–	2	–	1
Oregon		–		3	–	3	–	1
New Mexico A&M		–		3	–	3	–	1
San Jose Normal		–		3	–	3	–	1
Arizona Normal		–		1	–	1	–	0
USC		–		1	–	1	–	1
Wyoming		–		3	–	3	–	0
Washington		–		1	–	2	–	2
Montana		–		0	–	1	–	0
Utah Agricultural		–		0	–	2	–	0

The 1900 California Golden Bears football team was an American football team that represented the University of California, Berkeley during the 1900 college football season. The team competed as an independent under head coach Addison Kelly and compiled a record of 4–2–1.

In the Big Game versus Stanford, a large crowd of people gathered upon the roof of a nearby glass blowing factory to watch for free. The roof collapsed, killing 23 and injuring over 100 more. The Thanksgiving Day Disaster remains the deadliest accident at a sporting event in U.S. history.

== Schedule ==
Date	Opponent	Site	Result	Attendance	Source
October 6	Reliance Athletic Club	Berkeley, CA	T 0–0		
October 20	Reliance Athletic Club	Berkeley, CA	W 5–0		
November 10	Reliance Athletic Club	Berkeley, CA	W 11–0		
November 14	Nevada State	Berkeley, CA	W 32–0		
November 17	Oregon	Berkeley, CA	L 0–2		
November 22	San Jose Normal	Berkeley, CA	W 5–0		
November 29	vs. Stanford	Richmond Field; San Francisco, CA (Big Game)	L 0–5	19,000	
