= List of New Mexico Lobos head football coaches =

List of head football coaches for the New Mexico Lobos

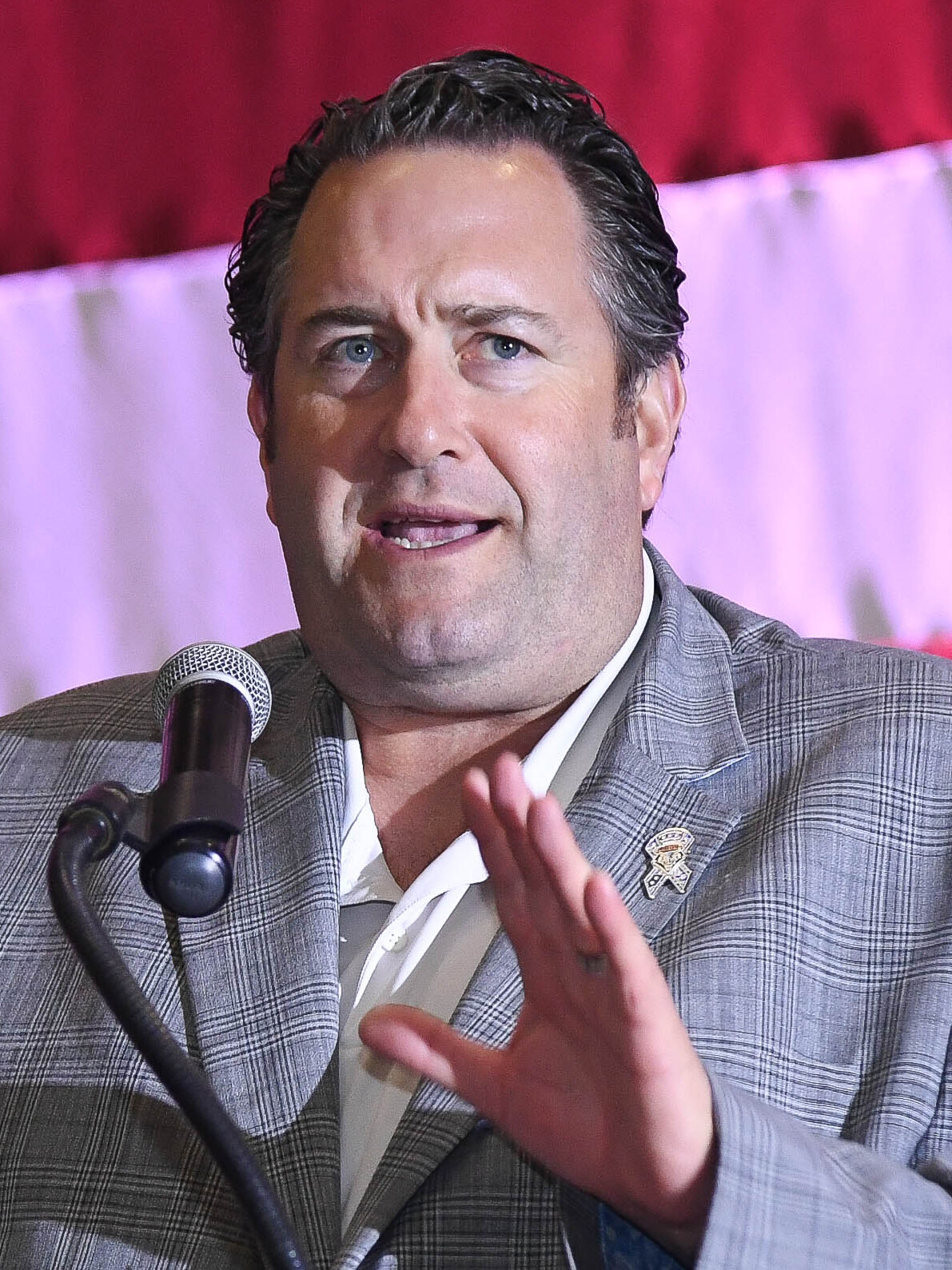
Jason Eck Current Head Coach of the New Mexico Lobos.

The New Mexico Lobos college football team represents the University of New Mexico in the Mountain West Conference (MWC), as part of the NCAA Division I Football Bowl Subdivision. The program has had 33 head coaches, and 1 interim head coach, since it began play during the 1892 season. Since December 2024, Jason Eck has served as New Mexico's head coach.

Six coaches have led New Mexico in postseason bowl games: Ted Shipkey, Willis Barnes, Dennis Franchione, Rocky Long, Bob Davie, and Eck. Two coaches have won division titles: Franchione won one Western Athletic Conference (WAC) Mountain division and Davie won one MWC Mountain division title. Two coaches also won conference championships: Shipkey won one as a member of the Border Conference and Bill Weeks won three as a member of the WAC.

Long is the leader in seasons coached, with 11 years as head coach and games coached (134), won (65). Walter McEwan has the highest winning percentage at .900. Carl Hamilton has the lowest winning percentage of those who have coached more than one game, with .000.

== Key ==
Key to symbols in coaches list
General		Overall		Conference		Postseason (Note: Although the first Rose Bowl Game was played in 1902, it has been continuously played since the 1916 game, and is recognized as the oldest bowl game by the NCAA. "—" indicates any season prior to 1916 when postseason games were not played.)	
No.	Order of coaches (Note: A running total of the number of head coaches, with coaches who served separate tenures being counted only once. Interim head coaches are represented with "Int" and are not counted in the running total. "—" indicates the team played but either without a coach or no coach is on record. "X" indicates an interim year without play.)	GC	Games coached	CW	Conference wins	PW	Postseason wins
DC	Division championships	OW	Overall wins	CL	Conference losses	PL	Postseason losses
CC	Conference championships	OL	Overall losses	CT	Conference ties	PT	Postseason ties
NC	National championships	OT	Overall ties (Note: Overtime rules in college football were introduced in 1996, making ties impossible in the period since.)	C%	Conference winning percentage		
†	Elected to the College Football Hall of Fame	O%	Overall winning percentage (Note: When computing the win–loss percentage, a tie counts as half a win and half a loss.)				

== Coaches ==
List of head football coaches showing season(s) coached, overall records, conference records, postseason records, championships and selected awards (Note: Statistics correct as of the end of the 2025 NCAA Division I FCS football season.)
No.	Name (Note: New Mexico did not have a head coach for their 1892, 1893, and 1899 seasons.)	Year(s) (Note: New Mexico did not field a team for their 1895–1898, 1900, and 1918 seasons.)	Season(s)	GC	OW	OL	OT	O%	CW	CL	CT	C%	PW	PL	PT	DC	CC	NC	Awards
1	William A. Zimmer	1894	1	3	1	1	1	0.500	—	—	—	—	—	—	—	—	—	0	—
2	Joe Napier	1901	1	4	0	3	1	0.125	—	—	—	—	—	—	—	—	—	0	—
3	Walter McEwan	1903–1904	2	5	4	0	1	0.900	—	—	—	—	—	—	—	—	—	0	—
4	Martin F. Angell	1905–1907	3	12	9	2	1	0.792	—	—	—	—	—	—	—	—	—	0	—
5	Hermon H. Conwell	1908	1	6	5	1	0	0.833	—	—	—	—	—	—	—	—	—	0	—
6	Sam P. McBirney	1909	1	6	4	2	0	0.667	—	—	—	—	—	—	—	—	—	0	—
7	Carl Hamilton	1910	1	3	0	3	0	.000	—	—	—	—	—	—	—	—	—	0	—
8	Ralph Hutchinson	1911–1916	6	28	13	13	2	0.500	—	—	—	—	—	—	—	—	—	0	—
9	Frank E. Wood	1917	1	3	1	2	0	0.333	—	—	—	—	—	—	—	—	—	0	—
10	John F. McGough	1919	1	5	3	0	2	0.800	—	—	—	—	—	—	—	—	—	0	—
11	Roy W. Johnson	1920–1930	11	79	41	32	6	0.557	—	—	—	—	—	—	—	—	—	0	—
12	Chuck Riley	1931–1933	3	23	7	13	3	0.370	4	6	2	0.417	—	—	—	—	0	0	—
13	Gwinn Henry	1934–1936	3	28	16	12	0	0.571	7	7	0	0.500	—	—	—	—	0	0	—
14	Ted Shipkey	1937–1941	5	45	26	17	2	0.600	17	11	2	0.600	0	1	0	—	1	0	—
15	Willis Barnes	1942–1946	5	44	19	20	5	0.489	8	8	2	0.500	1	1	1	—	0	0	—
16	Berl Huffman	1947–1949	3	31	8	22	1	0.274	3	17	1	0.167	0	0	0	—	0	0	—
17	Dudley DeGroot	1950–1952	3	30	13	17	0	0.433	9	10	0	0.474	0	0	0	—	0	0	—
18	Bob Titchenal	1953–1955	3	28	12	15	1	0.446	7	10	1	0.417	0	0	0	—	0	0	—
19	Dick Clausen	1956–1957	2	20	8	12	0	0.400	4	8	0	0.333	0	0	0	—	0	0	—
20	Marv Levy	1958–1959	2	20	14	6	0	0.700	9	3	0	0.750	0	0	0	—	0	0	—
21	Bill Weeks	1960–1967	8	82	40	41	1	0.494	17	21	1	0.449	0	0	0	—	3	0	—
22	Rudy Feldman	1968–1973	6	63	24	37	2	0.397	16	22	0	0.421	0	0	0	—	0	0	—
23	Bill Mondt	1974–1979	6	69	31	37	1	0.457	18	23	0	0.439	0	0	0	—	0	0	—
24	Joe Morrison	1980–1982	3	34	18	15	1	0.544	12	9	1	0.568	0	0	0	—	0	0	—
25	Joe Lee Dunn	1983–1986	4	47	17	30	0	0.362	9	21	0	0.300	0	0	0	—	0	0	—
26	Mike Sheppard	1987–1991	5	59	9	50	0	0.153	4	34	0	0.105	0	0	0	—	0	0	—
27	Dennis Franchione	1992–1997	6	69	33	36	0	0.478	21	27	0	0.438	0	1	0	1	0	0	—
28	Rocky Long	1998–2008	11	134	65	69	—	0.485	40	34	—	0.541	1	4	—	0	0	0	—
29	Mike Locksley	2009–2011	3	28	2	26	—	0.071	2	15	—	0.118	0	0	—	—	0	0	—
Int	George Barlow (Note: Barlow served as interim head coach for the final eight games of the 2011 season after Mike Locksley was fired.)	2011	1	8	1	7	—	0.125	1	6	—	0.143	0	0	—	—	0	0	—
30	Bob Davie	2012–2019	8	99	35	64	—	0.354	17	47	—	0.266	1	1	—	1	0	0	—
31	Danny Gonzales	2020–2023	4	43	11	32	—	0.256	5	26	—	0.161	0	0	—	0	0	0	—
32	Bronco Mendenhall	2024	1	12	5	7	—	0.417	3	4	—	0.429	0	0	—	—	0	0	—
33	Jason Eck	2025–present	1	13	9	4	—	0.692	6	2	—	0.750	0	1	—	0	0	0	—
