= James Hopper (writer) =

American writer and novelist (1876–1956)

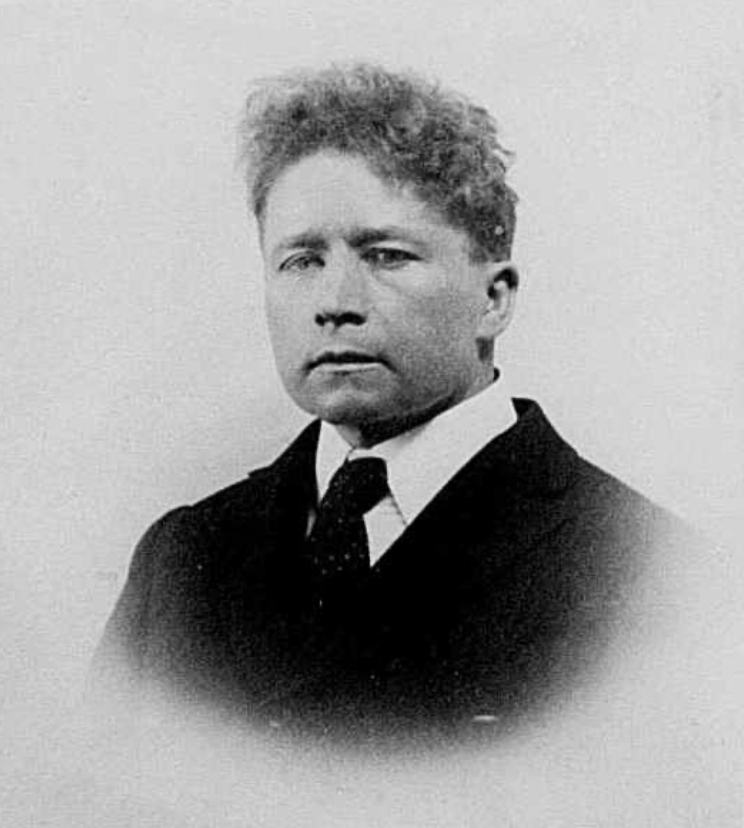
- Hopper, 1917

Biographical details
- Born: July 23, 1876; Paris, France
- Died: August 28, 1956 (aged 80); Carmel-by-the-Sea, California, U.S.
- Education: University of California, Berkeley (1898)

Playing career
- 1896–1897: California
- 1899: California
- Positions: End, quarterback

Coaching career (HC unless noted)
- 1900: Nevada State
- 1904: California

Head coaching record
- Overall: 10–3–2

James Marie Hopper (July 23, 1876 – August 28, 1956) was an American writer and novelist. He was also an early college football player and coach, playing at the University of California, Berkeley in the late 1890s and then serving single seasons as head football coach at Nevada State University—now known as the University of Nevada, Reno—in 1900 and at his alma mater, California, in 1904. During his lifetime, Hopper published 450 short stories and six novels.

== Early life, education, and college football career ==
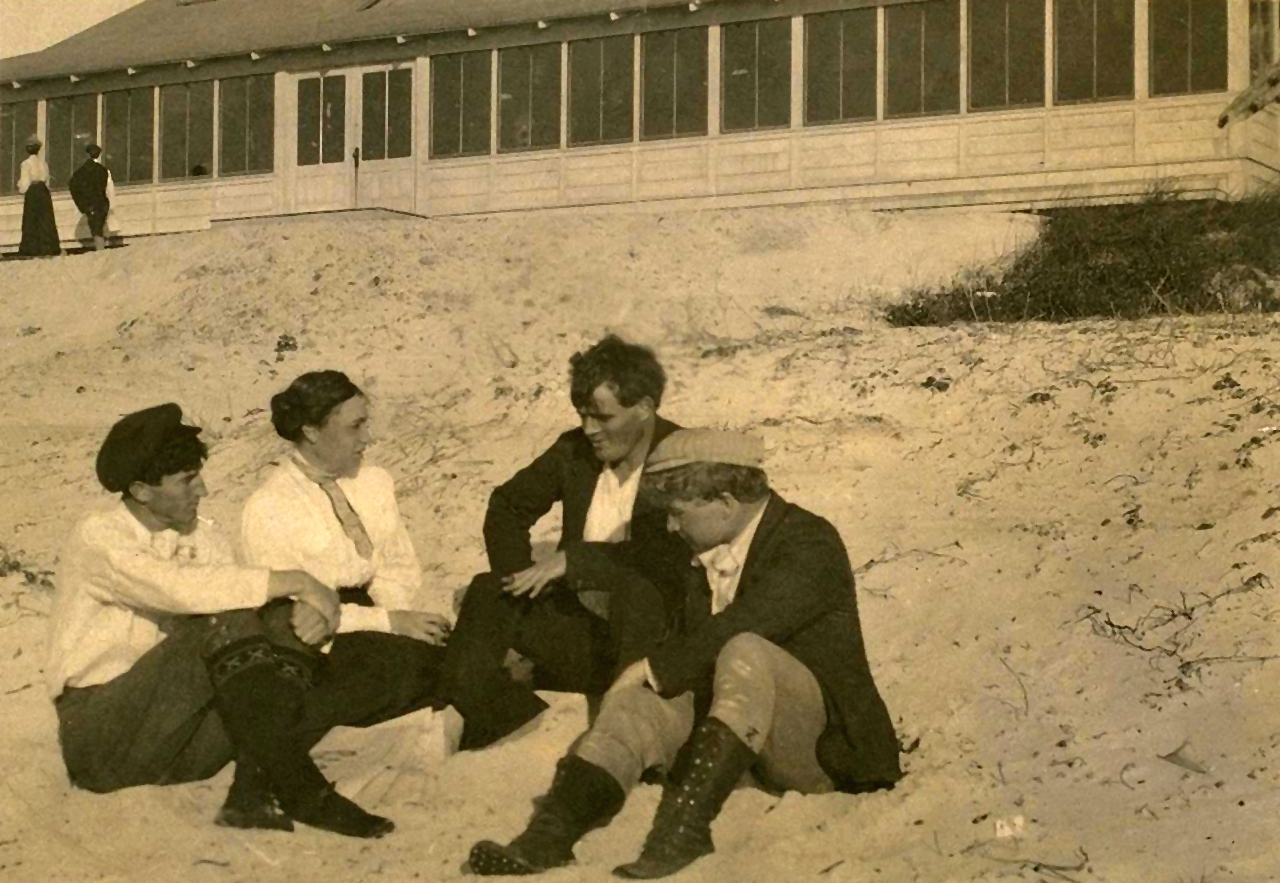
Mary Austin, Jack London, George Sterling, and Jimmy Hopper.

Hopper was born on July 23, 1876, in Paris, France, to John Joseph Hopper, a native of Ireland, and his wife, Victoire Blanche Lefebvre. He attended schooling in Paris and later immigrated to the United States with his mother to California, where he completed his preliminary education.

Hopper graduated from the University of California, Berkeley with the class of 1898. While at Berkeley, he played football and first as an end and later at quarterback. He completed law school at the Hastings Law School. He passed the state bar examination but never practiced law. Instead he worked as a reporter on the San Francisco Chronicle, and was on the staff of The Wave, a literary San Francisco weekly.

In 1900, Hopper was hired to coach football at Nevada State University—now known as the University of Nevada, Reno. He led the 1900 Nevada State Sagebrushers football team to a record of 4–2–1 including a win over Stanford.

Hopper married Mattie E. Leonard on September 21, 1901, at her father's San Francisco residence, Joseph E. Leonard, and her mother. The coupled honeymooned to Southern California.

== Writing career ==
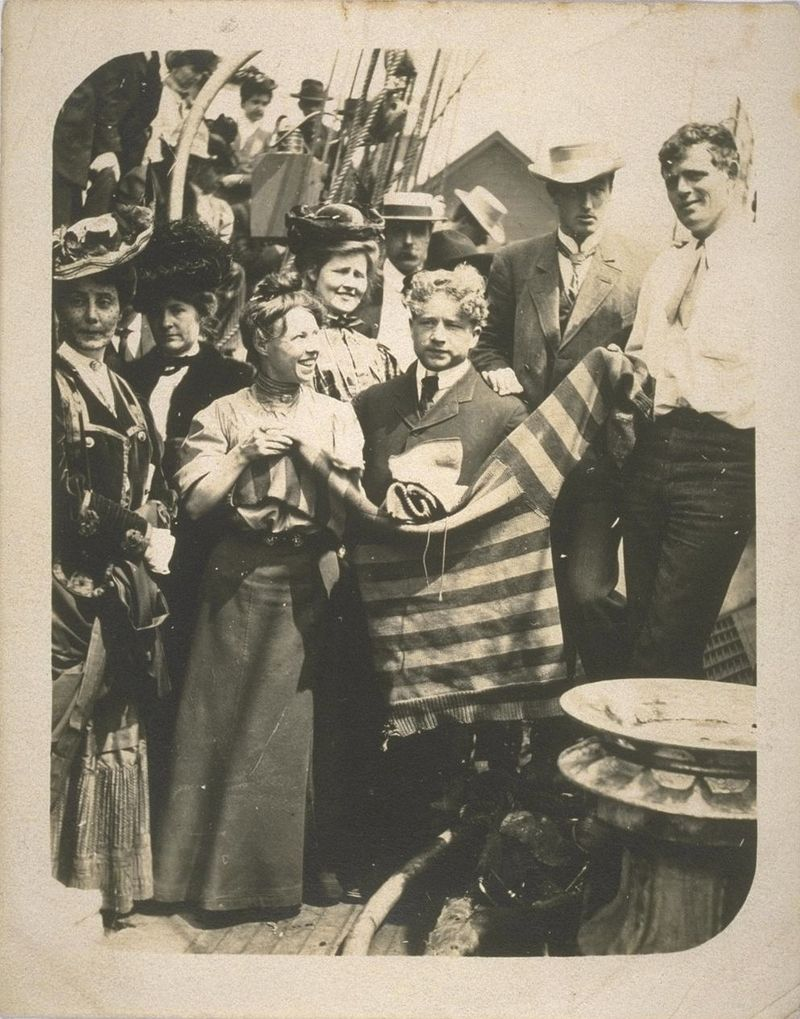
James Hopper with Jack London. The photo was taken in Oakland in April 1907, as the Londons prepared to embark on a round-the-world cruise.

After coaching at the University of California in 1904, Hopper was sent to the Philippines, by the McClure's magazine, to write a new book. When they returned to the United States, Hopper joined the McClure's staff in San Francisco. He then became a reporter for The San Francisco Call at the time of the 1906 San Francisco earthquake. He ended up staying there for two years to teach school. Hopper first met Herman Whitaker, George Sterling, and Jack London at Whitaker's home in Piedmont, California.

In 1907, he and his wife moved to Carmel-by-the-Sea, California where his good friend, George Sterling, had established "Bohemia-by-the Sea". There he rented a cottage on Dolores and 9th Avenue, by the beach where he published stories that he hoped to sell to magazines. In 1913, Hopper and his wife purchased George Sterling's cottage, when Sterling returned to San Francisco. The house burned down in 1924 and he rebuilt it on the same site with thermotite cement blocks, a locally produced fireproof building material. In 1938, Hopper sold the house to John P. Gilbert and his wife, the parents of Mrs. Ungaretti.

In Carmel many of his close associates were friends from his encounters at Coppa's “bohemian” restaurant in San Francisco, including Harry Leon Wilson, Xavier Martinez, Arnold Genthe, painter Francis McComas and his wife Gene as well as Perry Newberry, Mary Hunter Austin, and Sinclair Lewis. He was also friends with writer Frederick R. Bechdolt. Together, they wrote the fictional novel 9009 about the condition of American prisons and the need for reform.

Editors print it that way. Everyone else says "Jimmy." Famous football star in his youth he can still be seen in the village streets with the kids kicking the pig-skin. He boots a mean ball what we mean! In 1918 known throughout the county as war correspondent for Collier's Forty Carmelites raised their demijohns to his health and safety at picnic festivities November 11th, 1918, at which moment he was busy touching off the last cannon shot in the world war! He returned to take into his arms his new baby daughter Jane whom he then saw for the first time. The Hoppers are Carmel's most genial hosts. Ah! the good times that have been had by all in the Hopper home!

— Carmel Pine Cone

Hopper was close friends with novelist Jack London. In April 1907, London was aboard his boat, the Snark, when he held the sleeve of a football sweater with his wife Charmian, and Hopper. The Londons were prepared to embark on a round-the-world cruise. London hoisted his old friend's jersey up the mast and flew it like a flag as the Snark sailed past the Golden Gate and out of San Francisco Bay.

When he left Carmel he returned to Oakland to write stories of his Philippine adventures for Sunset and other magazines.

Hopper gained United States citizenship in 1917. During World War I, he worked as a correspondent for Collier's magazine. At the end of the war, he became a full-time Carmel resident. He was active at the Forest Theater and the Abalone League in Carmel.

During the Great Depression in the United States, he served in the WPA's Federal Writers' Project as a state director and later as the northern regional director.

== Death ==
Hopper died at his Carmel home on August 28, 1956, at age 80. Funeral services were held in Pacific Grove, California.

== Gallery ==
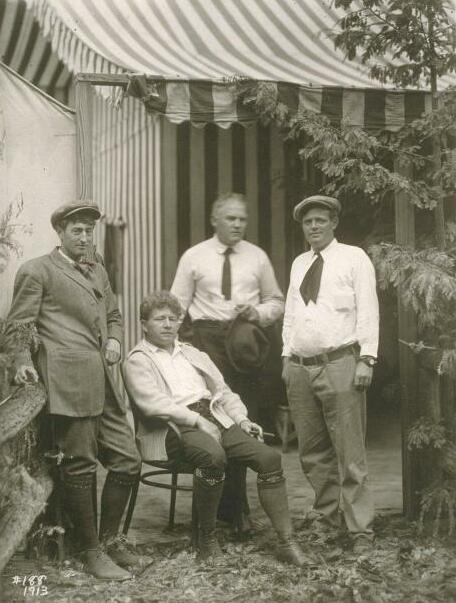
George Sterling, James Hopper, Harry Leon Wilson, London. Bohemian Grove

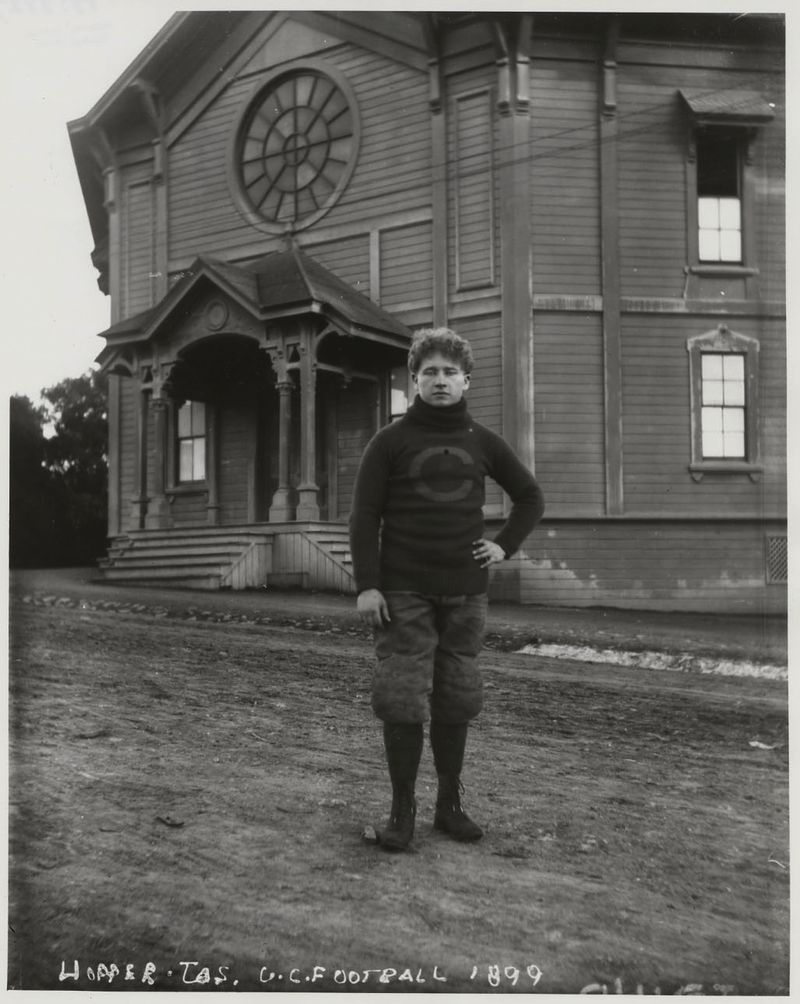
James Hopper (1899) at University of California

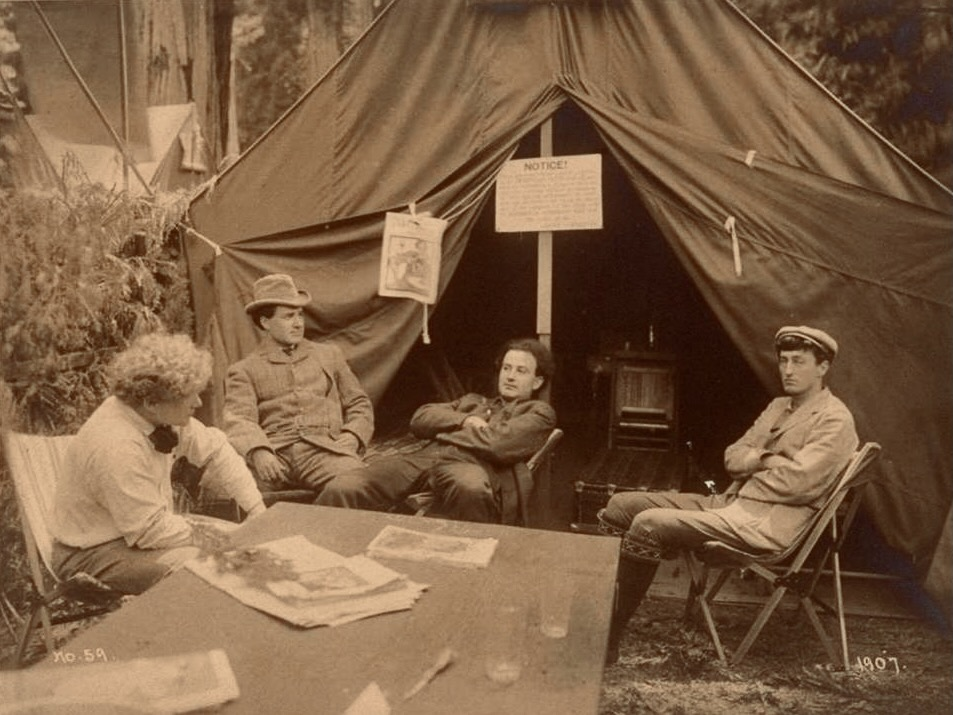
James Hopper, Herman Scheffauer, Harry Lafler, and George Sterling at the Bohemian Grove (1907)

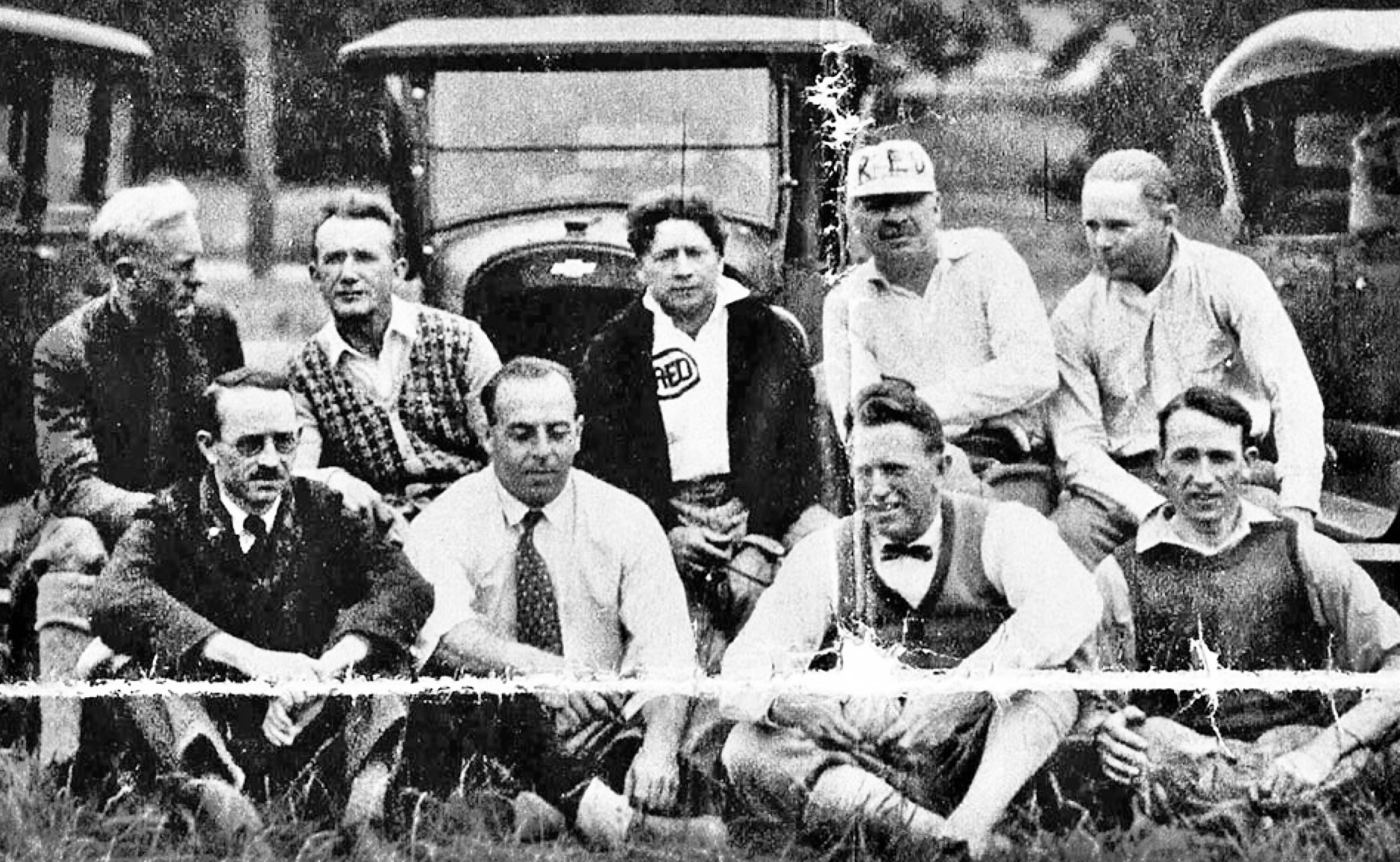
Abalone League players

== Head coaching record ==
Year	Team	Overall	Conference	Standing	Bowl/playoffs
Nevada State Sagebrushers (Independent) (1900)
1900	Nevada State	4–2–1			
Nevada State:		4–2–1			
California Golden Bears (Independent) (1904)
1904	California	6–1–1			
California:		6–1–1			
Total:		10–3–2			

== Works ==
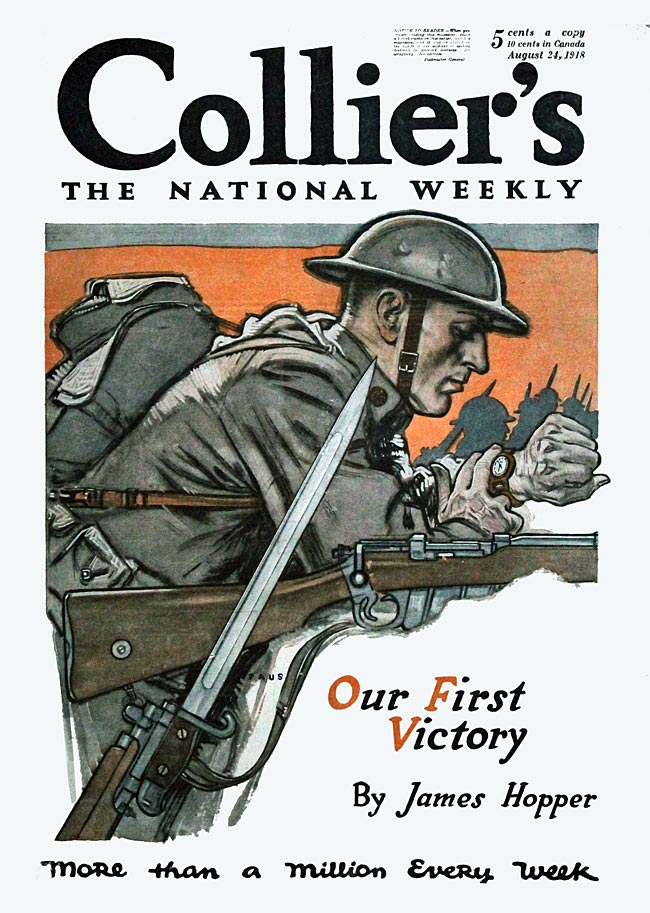
Our First Victory by James Hopper, Collier's Aug 24, 1918.

- "The Proud Dig and the Lazy Student" (1901) (short story published by A. M. Robertson)
- Caybigan (1906) (short stories)
- 9009 (1908)
- The Trimming of Goosie (1909)
- The Freshman (1912)
- What Happened in the Night, and Other Stories (1913) (short stories)
- Coming Back With the Spitball, a Pitcher's Romance (1914)
- Medals Of Honor (1929) illus. John Alan Maxwell

=== Short works from magazines ===
- Passing of the Vet (1904 Nov, McClure's)
- A Jumble in Divinities (1904 Nov & Dec, McClure's Magazine)
- The Pity of Woman (1906 May, Everybody's)
- Our San Francisco (1906 June, Everybody's)
- A Boy and a Girl (1906 Sep, Harpers)
- Ali Baba (1907 Aug, McClure's Magazine)
- The Bit of Calico (1907 Nov, McClure's Magazine)
- Gus (1908 Nov, Century Magazine)
- The Hate That Saved (1908 Mar, Century Magazine)
- The Reformation of Jack Ketch (1909 Mar, McClure's)
- Training With the Tigers (1909, Saturday Evening Post)
- The Boy Who Lost Weight (1909, Saturday Evening Post)
- Banjo Nell, (1910 Feb, Collier's)
- The Boy Who Lost Weight (1909, Saturday Evening Post)
- The Black Night (1910 Jun, Harpers Monthly)
- The Difference (1913 Feb, Forum)
- The Night School (1914 Mar, Century Magazine)
- The Great Lottery (1917 Dec, Century Magazine)
- Our First Victory (1919 Aug, Collier's)
- The Scoop of Charles Hamilton Potts (1920 July & Aug, Everybody's) (novelette)
- The Pessimist Rewarded (1920 Aug, Harpers)
- The Little Cave-Boy (1921 Jan, Everybody's)
- The Ship in the Bottle, (1922 Windsor)
- Jerrup (1922 Aug, Century Magazine)
