= 1900 Stanford football team =

American college football season

1900 Stanford football
- Conference: Independent
- Record: 7–2–1
- Head coach: Fielding H. Yost (1st season)
- Captain: William Wesley Burnett

1900 Far West college football independents records
| | Conf. | | | Overall |
| Team | W | L | T | W | | L | | T |
|---|---|---|---|---|---|---|---|---|
| Washington Agricultural | | – | | 4 | – | 0 | – | 1 |
| Idaho | | – | | 2 | – | 0 | – | 1 |
| Arizona | | – | | 3 | – | 1 | – | 0 |
| Montana Agricultural | | – | | 2 | – | 1 | – | 0 |
| Stanford | | – | | 7 | – | 2 | – | 1 |
| Utah | | – | | 2 | – | 1 | – | 0 |
| California | | – | | 4 | – | 2 | – | 1 |
| Nevada State | | – | | 4 | – | 2 | – | 1 |
| Oregon | | – | | 3 | – | 3 | – | 1 |
| New Mexico A&M | | – | | 3 | – | 3 | – | 1 |
| San Jose Normal | | – | | 3 | – | 3 | – | 1 |
| Arizona Normal | | – | | 1 | – | 1 | – | 0 |
| USC | | – | | 1 | – | 1 | – | 1 |
| Wyoming | | – | | 3 | – | 3 | – | 0 |
| Washington | | – | | 1 | – | 2 | – | 2 |
| Montana | | – | | 0 | – | 1 | – | 0 |
| Utah Agricultural | | – | | 0 | – | 2 | – | 0 |

The 1900 Stanford football team represented Stanford University in the 1900 college football season. In their first and only season under head coach Fielding H. Yost, the team compiled a 7–2 record, shut out seven of nine opponents, scored 154 points (17.1 points per game), and allowed 20 points (2.2 points per game) by opponents. The team registered three shutouts against the Reliance Club, two shutouts against San Jose Mormal, now known as San Jose State University, and single game shutouts against Oregon and California. The team's two losses came against Nevada State (6–0) and a Stanford alumni team (14–0) that featured coach Yost playing at the fullback position.

Stanford's final game of the season against California, played on Thanksgiving Day in San Francisco, drew the largest crowd to that date to watch a sporting event west of the Mississippi River. An overflow crowd watched from the roof of an adjacent factory. The weight of the spectators caused the roof to collapse, plunging a large group, primarily boys and young men, to the concrete floor and active furnaces of the factory. In all, 22 died and more than 70 were injured in an event later referred to as the Thanksgiving Day Disaster.

== Schedule ==
| Date | Opponent | Site | Result | Attendance |
|---|---|---|---|---|
| September 29 | Reliance Athletic Club | Stanford, CA | W 6–0 | |
| October 10 | at San Jose Normal | Cyclers' Park; San Jose, CA (rivalry) | W 35–0 | |
| October 13 | vs. Reliance Club | 16th Street Grounds; San Francisco, CA | W 6–0 | |
| October 20 | San Jose Normal | Stanford, CA | W 24–0 | |
| October 26 | Stanford alumni | Stanford, CA | L 0–14 | |
| November 3 | Reliance Athletic Club | Stanford, CA | W 44–0 | |
| November 10 | Oregon | Stanford, CA | W 34–0 | |
| November 17 | Nevada State | Stanford, CA | L 0–6 | |
| November 29 | vs. California | 16th Street Grounds; San Francisco, CA (Big Game) | W 5–0 | 19,000 |
| December 25 | at Multnomah Athletic Club | Portland, OR | T 0–0 | |

== Season summary ==
=== Preseason ===
The 1899 Stanford football team compiled a disappointing 2–5–2 record in their first and last year under head coach Burr Chamberlain. In December 1899, William Wesley "Babe" Burnett, a 26-year-old tackle and law student from Adelaide, California, was unanimously elected as the captain of the 1900 Stanford team.

On March 1, 1900, after a bidding war with Missouri, Stanford hired Fielding H. Yost as its football coach. Yost had led the 1899 Kansas team to an undefeated 10–0 record. The San Francisco Call reported at the time of Yost's hiring: "Yost seems to be a favorite wherever he goes, and his success lies in his ability to develop magnificent team work." However, some Stanford players, including team captain Burnett, initially objected to Yost's hiring on grounds that he came from a small college (Lafayette College) and was "not known to the leaders of college football in the East."

In July 1900, Stanford football administrator J. Burt Gildersleeve traveled east to inspect the football training facilities at Harvard, Yale, Princeton, and Penn. While in the east, he also met with coach Yost in Pittsburgh. Upon his return, Gildersleeve expressed confidence in the choice of Yost: "He impressed me as being a man of strong personality and wonderful magnetism, and he certainly knows the game from start to finish. . . . I am confident that he will be a success, and I think we were fortunate in securing his services against the higher bid of Missouri."

In early August 1900, Frank Slaker announced his intention to transfer to Stanford from the University of Chicago to study mining engineering. Slaker had been a second-team All-American and first-team All-Western player on Amos Alonzo Stagg's Chicago Maroons football teams.

On August 21, 1900, Yost arrived at Stanford. Upon his arrival, Yost expressed confidence that he could turn out a team that would defeat rival California. The San Francisco Chronicle reported that Yost impressed those he met as a "thorough gentleman" who "looks every inch an athlete." Upon arriving, Yost commenced supervising the development of the team's new football field.

=== Game 1: Reliance ===
On September 29, 1900, Stanford opened its 1900 football season with a 6-0 victory over the Reliance Club. Stanford threatened to score reportedly but registered the game's only touchdown late in the second half. The touchdown was scored by a guard named Seeley who was pushed over the goal line by his teammates. The game included the first appearance for Stanford by fullback Frank Slaker. The San Francisco Call reported that Slaker "showed remarkable speed in line-plunging, but was too fast for his support." Stanford's lineup against Reliance was as follows: Thompson and Allen (left end); Traeger (left tackle); DeForest (left guard); Lee (center); Seeley (right guard); Burnett (right tackle); Cooper (right end); Hill (left halfback); Fisher (right halfback); Raitt (quarterback); and Slaker (fullback).

=== Game 2: at San Jose Normal ===
On October 10, 1900, Stanford defeated San Jose Normal by a 35–0 score. The game was played at Cyclers' Park in San Jose, California. Stanford's left halfback Geissler scored two touchdowns on long end runs. Additional touchdowns were scored by quarterback Raitt and left tackle Traeger, who returned a fumble for a score. Stanford led 23–0 at halftime. Hill replaced Geissler at left halfback in the second half and scored two touchdowns. Willie Heston, who later played for Yost at Michigan, was the starting left halfback for the San Jose Normal team. Stanford's lineup in the game was as follows: Allen and Luck (left end); Traeger (left tackle); DeForest (left guard); Lee (center); Seeley (right guard); Burnett (right tackle); Cooper and McFadden (right end); Raitt and Erb (quarterback); Geissler and Hill (left halfback); Smith (right halfback); and Slaker (fullback).

=== Game 3: vs. Reliance ===
On October 13, 1900, Stanford played its second game against the Reliance Club, this time at the 16th Street Grounds in San Francisco before a crowd estimated at between 500 and 600 spectators. Stanford again won by a 6-0 score. After a scoreless first half, "Coach Yost hurried his cardinal squad up the field and gave each player new advice on how to act in the second half." In all Stanford ran with the ball 81 times, gaining 320 yards. Slaker scored the only touchdown. Stanford's lineup for its second game against Reliance was as follows: Allen (left end); Traeger (left tackle); DeForest (left guard); Lee (center); Seeley (right guard); Burnett (right tackle); Cooper (right end); Raitt (quarterback); Geissler (left halfback); Fisher (right halfback); Slaker (fullback).

=== Game 4: San Jose Normal ===
On October 20, 1900, Stanford played its second game against San Jose Normal, this time at Stanford Field. After a scoreless first half, Stanford scored 24 points in the second half and won by a 24-0 score. Despite the score, the San Francisco Chronicle reported that Stanford's "formations were slow and ineffective and every main in the team lacked life." The Chronicle also praised the performance of the San Jose Normal's left halfback Willie Heston: "The right side of the cardinal line was especially weak, Heston plunging through it as he pleased." Stanford coach Yost was not present at the game, opting instead to travel to Berkeley to watch the University of California team play against the Reliance Club. Stanford's lineup against the San Jose Normal was as follows: Cooper (right end); Burnett (right tackle); Seeley (right guard); Lee (center); Emerson (left guard); Traeger (left tackle); McFadden (left end); Raitt (quarterback); Fisher (right halfback); Hill (left halfback); and Slaker (fullback).

=== Game 5: Stanford alumni ===
On October 26, 1900, Stanford was defeated by a team made up of Stanford alumni. The game, played at Stanford Field, ended in a 13–0 in favor of the alumni. Adding to the defeat, Stanford's starting right halfback, Ralph Fisher, sustained a broken collarbone in the game. Stanford's 29-year-old coach Yost played at the fullback position for the alumni team and was, with other alumni backs, reportedly "all over and around the varsity." The alumni led 2-0 at halftime. Yost kicked a goal after touchdown in the second half. The lineup against the alumni was as follows: Cooper (right end); Burnett (right tackle); Seeley (right guard); Lee (center); DeForest (left guard); Traeger (left tackle); Allen (left end); Erb (quarterback); Fisher (right halfback); Geissler (left halfback); Hill and Slaker (fullback).

=== Game 6: Reliance ===
On November 3, 1900, Stanford played the Reliance Club for the third time in one season. While the first two games had been close, Stanford won the third game by a 44-0 score at Stanford Field. Stanford scored on six touchdowns, four goals after touchdown, and two field goals (by Traeger). Stanford captain Burnett left the game with a leg injury. The University of California team watched the game from the bleachers. Stanford led 16-0 at halftime. Stanford's lineup for its third game against Reliance was as follows: McFadden (left end); Traeger (left tackle); Bentley and Emerson (left guard); McFadden and Gregory (center); Seeley (right guard); Lee and Burnett (right tackle); Cooper and Luck (right end); Raitt (quarterback); Allen (left halfback); Smith and Erb (right halfback); and Hill (fullback).

=== Game 7: Oregon ===
On November 10, 1900, Stanford defeated Oregon by a 34-0 score at Stanford Field. The San Francisco Chronicle described Erb's 70-yard touchdown run as "the best sprint seen on a Coast gridiron" since 1898. The Chronicle praised the performance of the Stanford team as a whole: "The Oregonians were completely smothered by the Cardinal interference. Stanford played throughout the game with a rare snap and dash." Stanford's lineup against Oregon was as follows: McFadden-Caglieri (left end); Traeger (left tackle); Emerson-DeForest (left guard); McFadden-Lee (center); Seeley (right guard); Bentley-Burnett (right tackle); Luck-Cooper (right end); Raitt (quarterback); Erb (left halfback); Allen-Erb (right halfback); and Hill (fullback).

=== Game 8: Nevada State ===
On November 17, 1900, Stanford lost to Nevada State by a 6 to 0 score at Stanford Field. The San Francisco Call compared the upset to "a bolt of lightning out of a clear sky." Stanford's lineup against Nevada State was as follows: Cooper and Luck (right end); Burnett and Nutter (right tackle); Seeley (right guard); Lee, McFadden and Gregory (center); Nutter and Emerson (left guard); Traeger (left tackle); McFadden (left end); Erb and Bausback (quarterback); Geissler and Allen (right halfback); Hill and Erb (left halfback); and Slaker (fullback).

=== Game 9: California ===
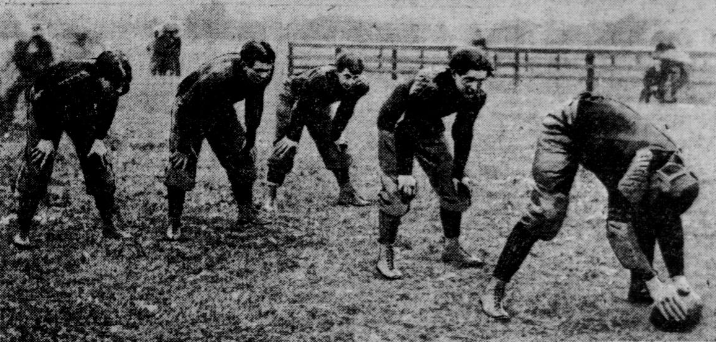
Stanford center and backs preparing for the California game in 1900

On Thanksgiving Day, November 29, 1900, Stanford played the 10th edition of its annual rivalry game with California at the 16th Street Grounds in San Francisco. Stanford won 5–0 on a field goal by left tackle Traeger. Stanford's lineup against California was McFadden (left end), Traeger (left tackle), DeForest (left guard), Lee and McFadden (center), Seeley (right guard), Burnett (right tackle), Cooper (right end), Raitt and Bansbach (quarterback), Hill (left halfback), Erb and Smith (right halfback), and Slaker (fullback). Stanford quarterback Charles Raitt was severely injured when he received a blow to the head in the second half; more than 10 days after the game, he was still unable to go outside.

The game is most notable due to a horrific accident that occurred among the spectators. The Thanksgiving Day game had become a popular event for several years running. In 1900, the game was played at the 16th Street Grounds in the midst of an industrial area of San Francisco. 19,000 spectators filled the stands, the largest crowd to witness a sporting event west of the Mississippi River. Many spectators chose not to pay the $1 admission and instead observed the game from the roof of the San Francisco and Pacific Glass Works across the street from the stands. During the game, the weight of hundreds of spectators caused the roof to collapse, plunging a large group of primarily boys and young men to the concrete floor and active furnaces of the glass factory. In all, 22 died and more than 70 were injured, some seriously. The "Thanksgiving Day Disaster" remains the deadliest accident ever at a U.S. sporting event.

=== Note regarding Multnomah ===
Some sources, including the College Football Data Warehouse, erroneously list a tenth football game played by Stanford on December 25, 1900, in Portland, Oregon, against a team from the Multnomah Athletic Club. However, that game was actually played by Stanford's "second team" without participation by any of the players on Stanford's 1900 varsity team. Contemporaneous news sources clearly indicate the game was played by Stanford's "second team", not by Stanford's varsity football team. Also, the Stanford yearbook does not include the Multnomah game in its record of the varsity football games for 1900, which are limited to the nine games above. The lineup for Stanford's "second eleven" against Multnomah was as follows: Montague (right end); Pratt (right tackle and captain); Kirkley (right guard); Harmer (center); Edmonston (left guard); Rusk (left tackle); Stansberry (left end); Kerrigan (quarterback); Hamilton (right halfback); Downs (left halfback); Davey (fullback).

=== After the season ===
At the end of the 1900 football season, Stanford passed a rule requiring all coaches to be alumni. The decision left coach Yost without a job. Yost was hired by Michigan, and his first recruit was Willie Heston from the California State Normal School in San Jose. Stanford freshman George W. Gregory also followed Yost to Michigan.

Charles Fickert replaced Yost as Stanford's football coach and led the team to a 3–2–2 during the 1901 season. Yost led the 1901 Michigan team to an 11–0 record, outscoring their opponents by the unprecedented total of 550 to 0. Michigan and Stanford met in the 1901 Rose Bowl, the first post-season bowl game. Michigan won by a 49–0 score.

== Players ==
The members of Stanford's 1900 varsity football team were as follows:

=== Starters ===
- Louis Philip Bansbach - quarterback
- William Wesley Burnett - captain and right tackle (9 games)
- Kenneth Farra Cooper - right end (9 games)
- Joseph Guthrie DeForest - left guard (6 games)
- William Maurice Erb - right halfback and quarterback (6 games)
- Harrison Wesley Hill - left halfback (8 games)
- Howard Shields Lee - center (9 games)
- Ralph Johh McFadden - center (4 games)
- Thomas L. McFadden - left end (6 games)
- Charles B. Raitt - quarterback (7 games)
- Carrol C. Seeley - right guard (9 games)
- Frank L. Slaker - fullback (7 games)
- Edward Augustus Smith Jr. - right halfback (3 games)
- William I. Traeger - left tackle (9 games)

=== Substitutes ===
- Charles Partridge Allen Jr.
- James Andrew Bentley
- G. I. Emerson
- Arthur D. Geissler
- Ottmar Henry Luck
- Edward Hoit Nutter
- J. N. Stanford
- Robert A. Thompson

== Coaches and administrators ==
- Coach: Fielding H. Yost
- Manager: J. Burt Gildersleeve
