= 1900 Normal School Owls football team =

American college football season

1900 Normal School Owls football
- Conference: Independent
- Record: 1–1
- Head coach: Frederick M. Irish (3rd season)
- Home stadium: Normal Field

1900 Far West college football independents records
	Conf.			Overall
Team	W	L	T	W		L		T
Washington Agricultural		–		4	–	0	–	1
Idaho		–		2	–	0	–	1
Arizona		–		3	–	1	–	0
Montana Agricultural		–		2	–	1	–	0
Stanford		–		7	–	2	–	1
Utah		–		2	–	1	–	0
California		–		4	–	2	–	1
Nevada State		–		4	–	2	–	1
Oregon		–		3	–	3	–	1
New Mexico A&M		–		3	–	3	–	1
San Jose Normal		–		3	–	3	–	1
Arizona Normal		–		1	–	1	–	0
USC		–		1	–	1	–	1
Wyoming		–		3	–	3	–	0
Washington		–		1	–	2	–	2
Montana		–		0	–	1	–	0
Utah Agricultural		–		0	–	2	–	0

The 1900 Normal School Owls football team was an American football team that represented the Normal School of Arizona (later renamed Arizona State University) as an independent during the 1900 college football season. In their third season under head coach Frederick M. Irish, the team compiled a 1–1 record and played both of its games against Phoenix High School, losing the first game, 5–0, and winning the second game by the same score.

== Schedule ==
Opponent	Site	Result
Phoenix High School	Normal Field; Tempe, Arizona Territory	L 0–5
at Phoenix High School	Phoenix, Arizona Territory	W 5–0
