= 1908 New Mexico A&M Aggies football team =

American college football season

1908 New Mexico A&M Aggies football
- Conference: Independent
- Record: 4–2
- Head coach: William G. Hummell (1st season)
- Home stadium: Miller Field

1908 Western college football independents records
	Conf.			Overall
Team	W	L	T	W		L		T
Arizona		–		5	–	0	–	0
New Mexico		–		5	–	1	–	0
Montana Agricultural		–		3	–	1	–	2
USC		–		3	–	1	–	1
New Mexico A&M		–		4	–	2	–	0
Utah Agricultural		–		4	–	2	–	0
Utah		–		4	–	2	–	1
Montana		–		1	–	3	–	1
Wyoming		–		1	–	2	–	0

The 1908 New Mexico A&M Aggies football team was an American football team that represented New Mexico College of Agriculture and Mechanical Arts (now known as New Mexico State University) during the 1908 college football season. In their first and only year under head coach William G. Hummell, the Aggies compiled a 4–2 record and outscored opponents by a total of 179 to 42. The team played home games on Miller Field.

== Schedule ==
Date	Opponent	Site	Result	Source
	El Paso Athletics	Miller Field; Mesilla Park, New Mexico Territory	L 0–5	
October 24	New Mexico Mines	Miller Field; Mesilla Park, New Mexico Territory	W 62–5	
October 31	at Fort Bliss	Washington Park; El Paso, TX	W 35–0	
November 14	at New Mexico Mines	Fair Grounds; Socorro, New Mexico Territory	W 39–10	
November 21	New Mexico	Miller Field; Mesilla Park, New Mexico Territory (rivalry)	L 6–10	
November 26	New Mexico Military	Miller Field; Mesilla Park, New Mexico Territory	W 37–12	
