= Lawrence Kaarsberg =

American athlete and coach (1876–1943)

Biographical details
- Born: August 6, 1876; California, U.S.
- Died: January 25, 1943 (aged 66); Vallejo, California, U.S.

Playing career

Football
- 1897–1898: California

Baseball
- 1899: California
- Position: Fullback

Coaching career (HC unless noted)

Football
- 1900: Oregon

Head coaching record
- Overall: 3–3–1

Lawrence C. "Kangaroo Pete" Kaarsberg (August 6, 1876 – January 25, 1943) was an American college football player and coach. He served as the head football coach at the University of Oregon in 1900, compiling a record of 3–3–1. Kaarsberg was a college athlete at the University of California, Berkeley, playing football and baseball. Kaarsberg died on January 25, 1943, at Vallejo General Hospital in Vallejo, California, after a heart attack.

== Head coaching record ==
Year	Team	Overall	Conference	Standing	Bowl/playoffs
Oregon Webfoots (Independent) (1900)
1900	Oregon	3–3–1			
Oregon:		3–3–1			
Total:		3–3–1			
