= 1900 Montana football team =

American college football season

1900 Montana football
- Conference: Independent
- Record: 0–1
- Head coach: Frank Bean (1st season)

1900 Far West college football independents records
	Conf.			Overall
Team	W	L	T	W		L		T
Washington Agricultural		–		4	–	0	–	1
Idaho		–		2	–	0	–	1
Arizona		–		3	–	1	–	0
Montana Agricultural		–		2	–	1	–	0
Stanford		–		7	–	2	–	1
Utah		–		2	–	1	–	0
California		–		4	–	2	–	1
Nevada State		–		4	–	2	–	1
Oregon		–		3	–	3	–	1
New Mexico A&M		–		3	–	3	–	1
San Jose Normal		–		3	–	3	–	1
Arizona Normal		–		1	–	1	–	0
USC		–		1	–	1	–	1
Wyoming		–		3	–	3	–	0
Washington		–		1	–	2	–	2
Montana		–		0	–	1	–	0
Utah Agricultural		–		0	–	2	–	0

The 1900 Montana football team represented the University of Montana as an independent during the 1900 college football season. Led by first-year head coach Frank Bean, Montana compiled a record of 0–1.

== Schedule ==
Date	Opponent	Site	Result	Source
November 29	Montana Agricultural	Missoula, MT (rivalry)	L 11–12	
