= William G. Hummell =

American football coach and professor (1882–1962)

William G. Hummel
Biographical details
- Born: February 19, 1882; Ford County, Illinois, U.S.
- Died: 1962 (aged 79–80)
- Education: UIUC (BS, 1907); UC–Berkeley (MS, 1912)

Playing career
- 1906: Illinois
- Position: Lineman

Coaching career (HC unless noted)
- 1908: New Mexico A&M

Head coaching record
- Overall: 4–2

William Granville Hummell (February 19, 1882 – 1962) was an American college football coach and university professor. He served as the head football coach at New Mexico State University–then known as the New Mexico College of Agriculture and Mechanic Arts–in 1908, compiling a record of 4–2, while he was working as an agronomy instructor at the school. He was a 1907 graduate of the University of Illinois at Urbana–Champaign, where he was a member of the class football team.

Hummell later served as a faculty member at a number of locations, including Oxnard High School in Oxnard, California, Fresno State University, Colorado State University, and the University of California, Berkeley.

== Head coaching record ==
Year	Team	Overall	Conference	Standing	Bowl/playoffs
New Mexico A&M Aggies (Independent) (1908)
1908	New Mexico A&M	4–2			
New Mexico A&M:		4–2			
Total:		4–2			
