= William A. Sutherland (American football) =

American football coach and lawyer

Biographical details
- Born: December 1, 1876; Corpus Christi, Texas, U.S.
- Died: May 21, 1969 (aged 92); Las Cruces, New Mexico, U.S.
- Education: New Mexico A&M (1898)

Coaching career (HC unless noted)
- 1900: New Mexico A&M

Head coaching record
- Overall: 3–3–1

William Alexander Sutherland (December 1, 1876 – May 21, 1969) was an American college football coach and lawyer. He served as the head football coach at New Mexico College of Agriculture and Mechanic Arts—now known as New Mexico State University—in 1900, compiling a record of 3–3–1. Sutherland was an 1898 graduate of New Mexico A&M and worked as a lawyer in Las Cruces.

== Head coaching record ==
Year	Team	Overall	Conference	Standing	Bowl/playoffs
New Mexico A&M Aggies (Independent) (1900)
1900	New Mexico A&M	3–3–1			
New Mexico A&M:		3–3–1			
Total:		3–3–1			
