= 1900 Utah Agricultural Aggies football team =

American college football season

1900 Utah Agricultural Aggies football
- Conference: Independent
- Record: 0–2
- Head coach: Willard Langton (2nd season)

1900 Far West college football independents records
	Conf.			Overall
Team	W	L	T	W		L		T
Washington Agricultural		–		4	–	0	–	1
Idaho		–		2	–	0	–	1
Arizona		–		3	–	1	–	0
Montana Agricultural		–		2	–	1	–	0
Stanford		–		7	–	2	–	1
Utah		–		2	–	1	–	0
California		–		4	–	2	–	1
Nevada State		–		4	–	2	–	1
Oregon		–		3	–	3	–	1
New Mexico A&M		–		3	–	3	–	1
San Jose Normal		–		3	–	3	–	1
Arizona Normal		–		1	–	1	–	0
USC		–		1	–	1	–	1
Wyoming		–		3	–	3	–	0
Washington		–		1	–	2	–	2
Montana		–		0	–	1	–	0
Utah Agricultural		–		0	–	2	–	0

The 1900 Utah Agricultural Aggies football team was an American football team that represented Utah Agricultural College (later renamed Utah State University) during the 1900 college football season. In their second season under head coach Willard Langton, the Aggies compiled a 0–2 record.

On November 17, 1900, the team lost to the University of Utah by a 21–0 score at Logan, Utah. The game was the second in what became the Utah–Utah State football rivalry.

== Schedule ==
Date	Opponent	Site	Result	Attendance	Source
November 2	Ogden Deaf-Mute	Logan, UT	L 0–5		
November 17	Utah	Logan, UT (rivalry)	L 0–21		
