= 1900 Wyoming Cowboys football team =

American college football season

1900 Wyoming Cowboys football
- Conference: Independent
- Record: 3–3
- Head coach: William McMurray (1st season)
- Captain: Charles Ponting

1900 Far West college football independents records
| | Conf. | | | Overall |
| Team | W | L | T | W | | L | | T |
|---|---|---|---|---|---|---|---|---|
| Washington Agricultural | | – | | 4 | – | 0 | – | 1 |
| Idaho | | – | | 2 | – | 0 | – | 1 |
| Arizona | | – | | 3 | – | 1 | – | 0 |
| Montana Agricultural | | – | | 2 | – | 1 | – | 0 |
| Stanford | | – | | 7 | – | 2 | – | 1 |
| Utah | | – | | 2 | – | 1 | – | 0 |
| California | | – | | 4 | – | 2 | – | 1 |
| Nevada State | | – | | 4 | – | 2 | – | 1 |
| Oregon | | – | | 3 | – | 3 | – | 1 |
| New Mexico A&M | | – | | 3 | – | 3 | – | 1 |
| San Jose Normal | | – | | 3 | – | 3 | – | 1 |
| Arizona Normal | | – | | 1 | – | 1 | – | 0 |
| USC | | – | | 1 | – | 1 | – | 1 |
| Wyoming | | – | | 3 | – | 3 | – | 0 |
| Washington | | – | | 1 | – | 2 | – | 2 |
| Montana | | – | | 0 | – | 1 | – | 0 |
| Utah Agricultural | | – | | 0 | – | 2 | – | 0 |

The 1900 Wyoming Cowboys football team represented the University of Wyoming as an independent during the 1900 college football season. In its first season under head coach William McMurray, the team compiled a 3–3 record, including a 56–0 victory over Colorado State Normal, and outscored opponents by a total of 105 to 59. Charles Ponting was the team captain.

== Schedule ==
| Date | Opponent | Site | Result | Source |
|---|---|---|---|---|
| October 27 | Laramie town team | Laramie, WY | W 27–0 | |
| November 3 | at Denver Athletic Club | Denver, CO | L 0–33 | |
| November 10 | at Colorado | Boulder, CO | L 6–10 | |
| November 17 | at Salt Lake City YMCA | Walker's field; Salt Lake City, UT | W 16–0 | |
| November 24 | at Colorado Agricultural | Fort Collins, CO (rivalry) | L 0–16 | |
| November 29 | Colorado State Normal | Laramie, WY | W 56–0 | |
