= 1900 Oregon Webfoots football team =

American college football season

1900 Oregon Webfoots football
- Conference: Independent
- Record: 3–3–1
- Head coach: Lawrence Kaarsberg (1st season)
- Captain: Bernard Jakway
- Home stadium: Kincaid Field

1900 Far West college football independents records
	Conf.			Overall
Team	W	L	T	W		L		T
Washington Agricultural		–		4	–	0	–	1
Idaho		–		2	–	0	–	1
Arizona		–		3	–	1	–	0
Montana Agricultural		–		2	–	1	–	0
Stanford		–		7	–	2	–	1
Utah		–		2	–	1	–	0
California		–		4	–	2	–	1
Nevada State		–		4	–	2	–	1
Oregon		–		3	–	3	–	1
New Mexico A&M		–		3	–	3	–	1
San Jose Normal		–		3	–	3	–	1
Arizona Normal		–		1	–	1	–	0
USC		–		1	–	1	–	1
Wyoming		–		3	–	3	–	0
Washington		–		1	–	2	–	2
Montana		–		0	–	1	–	0
Utah Agricultural		–		0	–	2	–	0

The 1900 Oregon Webfoots football team represented the University of Oregon in the 1900 college football season. It was the Webfoots' seventh season; they competed as an independent and were led by head coach Lawrence Kaarsberg. They finished the season with three wins, three losses and one tie (3–3–1).

== Schedule ==
Date	Opponent	Site	Result	Attendance	Source
October 27	Salem Athletic Club	Kincaid Field; Eugene, OR	L 0–5		
November 3	at Multnomah Athletic Club	Multnomah Field; Portland, OR	L 0–5		
November 10	at Stanford	Stanford, CA	L 0–34		
November 17	at California	Berkeley, CA	W 2–0		
November 19	at Southern Oregon Normal	Ashland, OR	W 21–0		
November 29	at Multnomah Athletic Club	Multnomah Field; Portland, OR	T 0–0		
December 1	Washington	Kincaid Field; Eugene, OR (rivalry)	W 43–0	1,000	

== Background ==
A fence was erected at Kincaid Field ahead of the 1900 University of Oregon football season and a new grandstand planned to accommodate fans for the team's season-opener against the Salem Athletic Club. The visitors for the debut game — described as "about the only foot ball game which the Eugene people will have a chance of seeing this fall — featured halfback Clarence Bishop, formerly of Oregon's 1898 and 1899 teams. The team was taking advantage of fair weather to conduct practices at Kincaid Field each evening in preparation for the home game.
