= 1900 USC Methodists football team =

American college football season

1900 USC Methodists football
- Conference: Independent
- Record: 1–1–1
- Head coach: None
- Captain: Harry Woodard

1900 Far West college football independents records
	Conf.			Overall
Team	W	L	T	W		L		T
Washington Agricultural		–		4	–	0	–	1
Idaho		–		2	–	0	–	1
Arizona		–		3	–	1	–	0
Montana Agricultural		–		2	–	1	–	0
Stanford		–		7	–	2	–	1
Utah		–		2	–	1	–	0
California		–		4	–	2	–	1
Nevada State		–		4	–	2	–	1
Oregon		–		3	–	3	–	1
New Mexico A&M		–		3	–	3	–	1
San Jose Normal		–		3	–	3	–	1
Arizona Normal		–		1	–	1	–	0
USC		–		1	–	1	–	1
Wyoming		–		3	–	3	–	0
Washington		–		1	–	2	–	2
Montana		–		0	–	1	–	0
Utah Agricultural		–		0	–	2	–	0

The 1900 USC Methodists football team was an American football team that represented the University of Southern California during the 1900 college football season. The team competed as an independent without a head coach, compiling a 1–1–1 record.

== Schedule ==
Date	Opponent	Site	Result	Attendance
November 10	at Occidental	Los Angeles, CA	W 5–0	
November 24	vs. Los Angeles High School	Washington Park; Los Angeles, CA	T 0–0	
November 29	vs. Pomona	Washington Park; Los Angeles, CA	L 0–11	1,200
