= 1900 Arizona football team =

American college football season

1900 Arizona football
- Conference: Independent
- Record: 3–1
- Head coach: William W. Skinner (1st season)
- Captain: Courtland F. Day

1900 Far West college football independents records
	Conf.			Overall
Team	W	L	T	W		L		T
Washington Agricultural		–		4	–	0	–	1
Idaho		–		2	–	0	–	1
Arizona		–		3	–	1	–	0
Montana Agricultural		–		2	–	1	–	0
Stanford		–		7	–	2	–	1
Utah		–		2	–	1	–	0
California		–		4	–	2	–	1
Nevada State		–		4	–	2	–	1
Oregon		–		3	–	3	–	1
New Mexico A&M		–		3	–	3	–	1
San Jose Normal		–		3	–	3	–	1
Arizona Normal		–		1	–	1	–	0
USC		–		1	–	1	–	1
Wyoming		–		3	–	3	–	0
Washington		–		1	–	2	–	2
Montana		–		0	–	1	–	0
Utah Agricultural		–		0	–	2	–	0

The 1900 Arizona football team was an American football team that represented the University of Arizona as an independent during the 1900 college football season. The team did not play any intercollegiate games, compiled a 3–1 record, shut out three of four opponents, and outscored all opponents, 131 to 6. The team's victories came in games against the Tucson Indian School (two games) and a Tucson town team. The loss came against the Phoenix Indian School.

== Schedule ==
Date	Opponent	Site	Result	Attendance	Source
	Tucson Indian School	Tucson, Arizona Territory	W 34–0		
	Tucson town	Tucson, Arizona Territory	W 45–0		
November 17	Tucson Indian School	Tucson, Arizona Territory	W 52–0		
November 29	at Phoenix Indian School	Phoenix park; Phoenix, Arizona Territory	L 0–6	2,500–3,000	

== Personnel ==
Ogro Kenneth Dunham, a student in the school's Class of 1903, was the team's instructor when it reported for practice. However, he resigned as instructor to become a player. He was replaced by Professor William W. Skinner who became the coach. The team captain was Courtland F. Day, and Quin Anderson was the manager. Prior to the 1900 season, the team's colors were changed from sage green and silver to blue and cardinal.

The following players won varsity letters for their participation on the University of Arizona's 1900 football team: Courtland F. Day, Quin Anderson, Ross M. Russell, Edward Stafford, Duncan Hugh Campbell, Bertram Louis Smith, Kirke Tonner Moore, Thomas K. Marshall, J. N. Parker, Benito G. Suarez, George M. Parker, William T. Olney, William Reynolds, Fred Christy, William Marlar, and Leslie Gillett.
