= 1900 Washington football team =

American college football season

1900 Washington football
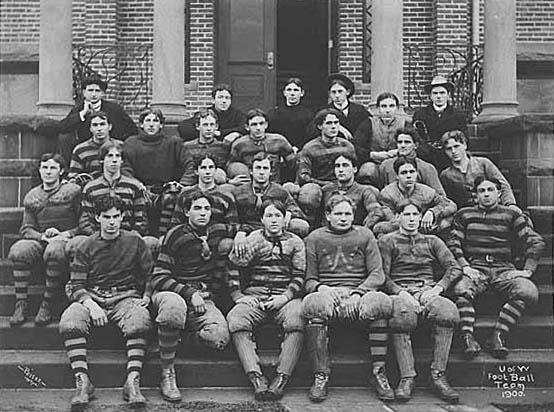
- Conference: Independent
- Record: 1–2–2
- Head coach: J. S. Dodge (1st season)
- Captain: Willis H. Corson
- Home stadium: Athletic Park

1900 Far West college football independents records
	Conf.			Overall
Team	W	L	T	W		L		T
Washington Agricultural		–		4	–	0	–	1
Idaho		–		2	–	0	–	1
Arizona		–		3	–	1	–	0
Montana Agricultural		–		2	–	1	–	0
Stanford		–		7	–	2	–	1
Utah		–		2	–	1	–	0
California		–		4	–	2	–	1
Nevada State		–		4	–	2	–	1
Oregon		–		3	–	3	–	1
New Mexico A&M		–		3	–	3	–	1
San Jose Normal		–		3	–	3	–	1
Arizona Normal		–		1	–	1	–	0
USC		–		1	–	1	–	1
Wyoming		–		3	–	3	–	0
Washington		–		1	–	2	–	2
Montana		–		0	–	1	–	0
Utah Agricultural		–		0	–	2	–	0

The 1900 Washington football team was an American football team that represented the University of Washington as an independent during the 1900 college football season. In its first season under coach J. S. Dodge, the team compiled a 1–2–2 record and outscored its opponents by a combined total of 71 to 21. W. H. Corson was the team captain.

== Schedule ==
Date	Opponent	Site	Result	Attendance	Source
September 29	Seattle High School	Athletic Park; Seattle, WA	W 5–0	500	
October 24	at Whitman	Walla Walla, WA	T 11–11	1,000	
October 27	vs. Idaho	Natatorium Park; Spokane, WA	L 6–12	1,000	
November 29	vs. Washington Agricultural	Athletic Park; Seattle, WA (rivalry)	T 5–5	1,500	
December 1	at Oregon	Kincaid Field; Eugene, OR (rivalry)	L 0–43	1,000	
