= Willard Langton =

American football coach and professor

Biographical details
- Born: February 26, 1872; Smithfield, Utah, U.S.
- Died: February 22, 1915 (aged 42); Manhattan, New York, U.S.

Coaching career (HC unless noted)
- 1899–1900: Utah Agricultural

Head coaching record
- Overall: 1–2

Willard Samuel Langton (February 26, 1872 – February 22, 1915) was an American mathematics professor and college football coach. He served as the head football coach at Utah State University–then known as Utah Agricultural College–in Logan, Utah from 1899 to 1900, compiling a record of 1–2. He was working at Columbia University in New York City at the time of his death in 1915.

== Head coaching record ==
Year	Team	Overall	Conference	Standing	Bowl/playoffs
Utah Agricultural Aggies (Independent) (1899–1900)
1899	Utah Agricultural	1–0			
1900	Utah Agricultural	0–2			
Utah Agricultural:		1–2			
Total:		1–2			
