= 1900 Washington Agricultural football team =

American college football season

1900 Washington Agricultural football
- Conference: Independent
- Record: 4–0–1
- Head coach: William L. Allen (1st season)
- Captain: J. O. Elton
- Home stadium: Soldier Field

1900 Far West college football independents records
	Conf.			Overall
Team	W	L	T	W		L		T
Washington Agricultural		–		4	–	0	–	1
Idaho		–		2	–	0	–	1
Arizona		–		3	–	1	–	0
Montana Agricultural		–		2	–	1	–	0
Stanford		–		7	–	2	–	1
Utah		–		2	–	1	–	0
California		–		4	–	2	–	1
Nevada State		–		4	–	2	–	1
Oregon		–		3	–	3	–	1
New Mexico A&M		–		3	–	3	–	1
San Jose Normal		–		3	–	3	–	1
Arizona Normal		–		1	–	1	–	0
USC		–		1	–	1	–	1
Wyoming		–		3	–	3	–	0
Washington		–		1	–	2	–	2
Montana		–		0	–	1	–	0
Utah Agricultural		–		0	–	2	–	0

The 1900 Washington Agricultural football team was an American football team that represented Washington Agricultural College during the 1900 college football season. The team competed as an independent under head coach William L. Allen and compiled a record of 4–0–1.

== Schedule ==
Date	Opponent	Site	Result	Attendance	Source
October 13	at Lewiston AA		W 2–0		
October 20	Spokane AC		W 6–0		
November 10	at Walla Walla AC		W 5–0		
November 24	at Spokane AC		W 21–0		
November 29	at Washington		T 5–5	1,500	
