= 1908 Wyoming Cowboys football team =

American college football season

1908 Wyoming Cowboys football
- Conference: Independent
- Record: 1–2
- Head coach: Robert Ehlman (2nd season)
- Captain: None

1908 Western college football independents records
	Conf.			Overall
Team	W	L	T	W		L		T
Arizona		–		5	–	0	–	0
New Mexico		–		5	–	1	–	0
Montana Agricultural		–		3	–	1	–	2
USC		–		3	–	1	–	1
New Mexico A&M		–		4	–	2	–	0
Utah Agricultural		–		4	–	2	–	0
Utah		–		4	–	2	–	1
Montana		–		1	–	3	–	1
Wyoming		–		1	–	2	–	0

The 1908 Wyoming Cowboys football team represented the University of Wyoming as an independent during the 1908 college football season. In their second and final season under head coach Robert Ehlman, the team compiled a 1–2 record and was outscored by a total of 95 to 66.

== Schedule ==
Date	Opponent	Site	Result	Source
October 27	Fort Warren	Laramie, WY	W 66–0	
November 7	at Utah	Salt Lake City, UT	L 0–75	
November 14	Colorado Agricultural	Laramie, WY (rivalry)	L 0–20	
