= 1908 Arizona football team =

American college football season

1908 Arizona football
- Conference: Independent
- Record: 5–0
- Head coach: H. B. Galbraith (1st season)
- Captain: Roderick Deann Burnham

1908 Western college football independents records
	Conf.			Overall
Team	W	L	T	W		L		T
Arizona		–		5	–	0	–	0
New Mexico		–		5	–	1	–	0
Montana Agricultural		–		3	–	1	–	2
USC		–		3	–	1	–	1
New Mexico A&M		–		4	–	2	–	0
Utah Agricultural		–		4	–	2	–	0
Utah		–		4	–	2	–	1
Montana		–		1	–	3	–	1
Wyoming		–		1	–	2	–	0

The 1908 Arizona football team was an American football team that represented the University of Arizona as an independent during the 1908 college football season. In its first season under head coach H. B. Galbraith, the tean compiled a 5–0 record, shut out four of five opponents, and outscored all opponents by a total of 136 to 6. The team captain was Roderick Deann Burnham.

== Schedule ==
Date	Opponent	Site	Result	Attendance	Source
October 31	Tucson Indian School	Tucson, Arizona Territory	W 27–0		
November 14	Tucson Indian School	Tucson, Arizona Territory	W 43–0		
November 21	Tucson Athletic Club	Elysian Grove; Tucson, Arizona Territory	W 36–0		
	Tucson Indian School	Tucson, Arizona Territory	W 20–0		
November 26	at New Mexico	Traction Park; Albuquerque, NM (rivalry)	W 10–5	2,000	
