= Normal Field (Arizona) =

Football stadium in Tempe, Arizona

Normal Field was the first football stadium of Arizona Normal School, which was operational from 1897 to 1926, when it was replaced by Irish Field.

The stadium was located at the southeast corner of Normal Drive and Orange Ave where the Computing Commons is currently located.
