= 1908 University of Utah football team =

American college football season

1908 University of Utah football
- Conference: Independent
- Record: 4–2–1
- Head coach: Joe Maddock (5th season)
- Captain: Dad Covill
- Home stadium: Cummings Field

1908 Western college football independents records
	Conf.			Overall
Team	W	L	T	W		L		T
Arizona		–		5	–	0	–	0
New Mexico		–		5	–	1	–	0
Montana Agricultural		–		3	–	1	–	2
USC		–		3	–	1	–	1
New Mexico A&M		–		4	–	2	–	0
Utah Agricultural		–		4	–	2	–	0
Utah		–		4	–	2	–	1
Montana		–		1	–	3	–	1
Wyoming		–		1	–	2	–	0

The 1908 University of Utah football team was an American football team that represented the University of Utah as an independent during the 1908 college football season. In its fifth season under head coach Joe Maddock, the team compiled a 4–2–1 record and outscored all opponents by a total of 206 to 49. The team played its home games at Cummings Field in Salt Lake City. Fullback "Dad" Covill was the team captain.

Utah met Idaho for the first time, in the season finale on Thanksgiving. The field was covered by two feet (60 cm) of snow and the scoreless game was called early.

== Schedule ==
Date	Opponent	Site	Result	Attendance	Source
September 26	Pocatello Athletic Association	Cummings Field; Salt Lake City, UT	W 80–0	2,000	
October 10	at Denver	Denver, CO	L 15–17		
October 17	at Colorado College	Washburn Field; Colorado Springs, CO	L 4–18		
October 24	Fort Douglas	Cummings Field; Salt Lake City, UT	W 11–0		
November 7	Wyoming	Cummings Field; Salt Lake City, UT	W 75–0		
November 14	Colorado	Cummings Field; Salt Lake City, UT (rivalry)	W 21–14		
November 26	Idaho	Cummings Field; Salt Lake City, UT	T 0–0		
