= James E. Addicott =

American football coach and professor

Biographical details
- Born: February 23, 1869; Taunton, England
- Died: March 22, 1957 (aged 88); Los Gatos, California, U.S.
- Education: Columbia

Coaching career (HC unless noted)
- 1893–1895: San Jose Normal
- 1900: San Jose Normal

James Edwin Addicott (February 23, 1869 – March 22, 1957) was an American college football coach and educator He served as the head football coach at San Jose State Normal School—now known as San Jose State University—in 1893, 1895, and 1900. Addicott was a fellow in the mathematics department at San Jose Normal from 1892 to 1900. He later served as high school principal, at Isidore Newman School in New Orleans from 1904 to 1908 and San Francisco Polytechnic High School from 1914 to 1939.

Addicott was born on February 23, 1869, in Taunton, England. He moved to the United States as a child, first to Ohio, and then to Modoc County, California, where as a teenager, he began teaching as a rural school, in the late 1880s. He graduated from San Jose State Normal School in 1890 and the St. Louis Manual Training School, in St. Louis, in 1891. At the St. Louis Manual Training School, he played football as a center in the school's scimmage against Washington University.

== Personal life and death ==
Addicott retired to Los Gatos, California in 1939. Additcott then married school teacher Sue Hubert Seager on June 8, 1946 in Los Gatos.

Addicott died on March 22, 1957, at his home in Los Gatos. He was buried at El Camelo Cemetery in Pacific Grove, California.
