= List of baseball parks in Salt Lake City =

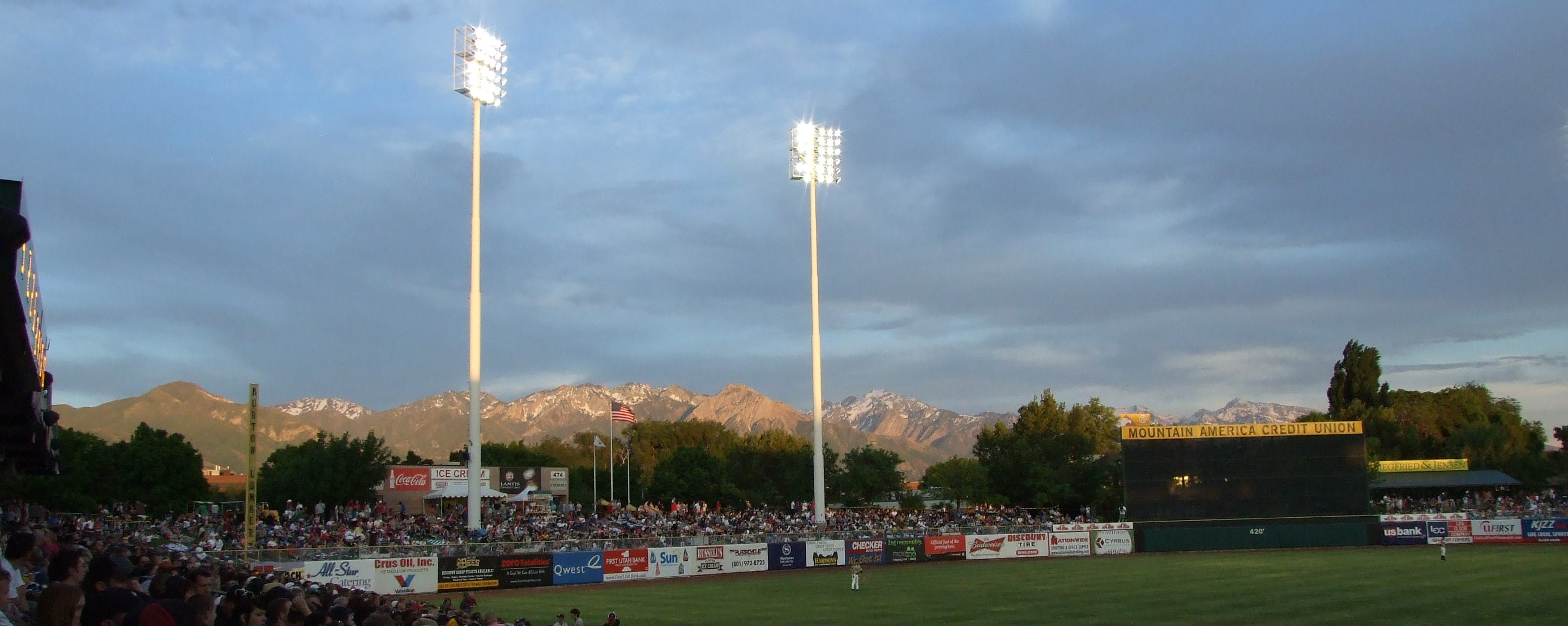
Smith's Ballpark

This is a list of venues used for professional baseball in Salt Lake City, Utah. The information is a synthesis of the information contained in the references listed.

Walker's Field (orig. opened 1899)
Home of:

Salt Lake White Wings – Inter-Mountain League (1901)
Salt Lake Elders – Pacific National League (mid-1903–1904)
Salt Lake Mormons – Inter-Mountain League (1909) (part-season)

Location: "Main Street, southwest corner Ninth Street South"

or "Main Street, corner American Avenue" (per city directories)

Currently: commercial businesses

Lucas Field orig. Cooley Park
Home of: Salt Lake Skyscrapers – Union Association (1911–1914)
Location: "800 South Street, near Main Street" (per city directories) –

800 South (south, first base); buildings and State Street (east, right field); buildings and 700 South (north, left field);
buildings and Main Street (west, third base)

Currently: a Sears facility

Bonneville Park orig. Majestic Park
Home of: Salt Lake Bees – Pacific Coast League (1915–1925)
Location: "9th South between Main and State" or "50 East Ninth Street South" (per city directories)

[on site of Salt Palace, which burned in 1910] – 900 South (north); State Street (east); American Avenue extension (south); Main Street a.k.a. East Temple Street (west)

Currently: commercial businesses

Derks Field orig. Community Field
Home of:

Salt Lake Bees – Utah–Idaho League (1926–1928)
Salt Lake Bees – Pioneer League (1939–1942, 1946–1957)
Salt Lake Bees – PCL (1958–1965)
Salt Lake Giants / Padres – Pioneer League (1967–1969)
Salt Lake Padres (1970) / Angels (1971–1984) / Gulls (1975–1984) – PCL (1970–1984)
Salt Lake Trappers – Pioneer League (1985–1992)

Location: "13th Street South, 7th and 8th Streets East" (per city directories) –

South West Temple Street (west, first base); West 13th Street (north, third base); South Main Street (east, left field); California Avenue (south, right field)

Currently: Smith's Ballpark

Smith's Ballpark orig. Franklin Quest Field, then Franklin Covey Field, then Spring Mobile Ballpark
Home of:

Salt Lake Bees – PCL (1994–2024)
Utah Utes (Big 12) 1994–present

Location: 1365 South West Temple Street (west, first base); West 13th Street (north, third base); South Main Street (east, left field)

The Ballpark at America First Square
Home of: Salt Lake Bees – PCL (2025–present)
Location: South Jordan, Utah 11111 Ballpark Drive (southwest, first base); Homeplate Drive (northwest, third base); Split Rock Drive and South Granville Avenue (northeast, left field); Center Field Drive and West Lake Avenue (southeast, right field)

== See also ==
- Lists of baseball parks
