= 1908 USC Methodists football team =

American college football season

1908 USC Methodists football
- Conference: Independent
- Record: 3–1–1
- Head coach: William I. Traeger (1st season)
- Captain: Stan Burek
- Home stadium: Bovard Field

1908 Western college football independents records
	Conf.			Overall
Team	W	L	T	W		L		T
Arizona		–		5	–	0	–	0
New Mexico		–		5	–	1	–	0
Montana Agricultural		–		3	–	1	–	2
USC		–		3	–	1	–	1
New Mexico A&M		–		4	–	2	–	0
Utah Agricultural		–		4	–	2	–	0
Utah		–		4	–	2	–	1
Montana		–		1	–	3	–	1
Wyoming		–		1	–	2	–	0

The 1908 USC Methodists football team was an American football team that represented the University of Southern California during the 1908 college football season. The team competed as an independent under head coach William I. Traeger, compiling a 3–1–1 record.

== Schedule ==
Date	Time	Opponent	Site	Result	Attendance	Source
October 10	2:30 p.m.	vs. Los Angeles High School	Fiesta Park; Los Angeles, CA	L 0–12	2,500	
October 17		Whittier	Bovard Field; Los Angeles, CA	W 15–0		
October 24		at Arrowhead Athletic Club	Meadow Brook Park athletic field; San Bernardino, CA	W 28–0		
November 7	2:30 p.m.	Occidental	Bovard Field; Los Angeles, CA	W 14–0		
November 14		Pomona	Bovard Field; Los Angeles, CA	T 6–6		
