= J. S. Dodge =

American football player and coach (1876–1950)

Biographical details
- Born: July 2, 1876; Elkhart, Indiana, U.S.
- Died: December 4, 1950 (aged 74); Colorado Springs, Colorado, U.S.

Playing career
- ?: Indiana

Coaching career (HC unless noted)
- 1900: Washington

Head coaching record
- Overall: 1–2–2

James Sayer Dodge Jr., (middle name also spelled Sayre; July 2, 1876 – December 4, 1950) was an American college football player and coach. He served as the head football coach at the University of Washington for one season in 1900, compiling a record of 1–2–2. Dodge played football at Indiana University, where he was the team's captain.

== Head coaching record ==
Year	Team	Overall	Conference	Standing	Bowl/playoffs
Washington (Independent) ({{{startyear}}})
1900	Washington	1–2–2			
Washington:		1–2–2			
Total:		1–2–2			
