= Hermon H. Conwell =

American football player, coach, and engineer (1886–1980)

Biographical details
- Born: 1886
- Died: 1980 (aged 93–94); Beloit, Wisconsin, U.S.

Playing career
- 1906: Kansas State

Coaching career (HC unless noted)
- 1908: New Mexico
- 1909: New Mexico (assistant)

Head coaching record
- Overall: 5–1

Hermon H. Conwell (1886–1980) was an American engineer and college football player and coach. He served as the head football coach at the University of New Mexico in 1908, compiling a record of 5–1.

Conwell was a 1907 graduate of Kansas State University, where he majored in electrical engineering. He served as a faculty member at the University of Kansas, the University of Idaho and Beloit College.

== Head coaching record ==
Year	Team	Overall	Conference	Standing	Bowl/playoffs
University of New Mexico (Independent) (1908)
1908	University of New Mexico	5–1			
University of New Mexico:		5–1			
Total:		5–1			
