= 1908 University of New Mexico football team =

American college football season

1908 University of New Mexico football
- Conference: Independent
- Record: 5–1
- Head coach: Hermon H. Conwell (1st season)
- Home stadium: Traction Park

1908 Western college football independents records
	Conf.			Overall
Team	W	L	T	W		L		T
Arizona		–		5	–	0	–	0
New Mexico		–		5	–	1	–	0
Montana Agricultural		–		3	–	1	–	2
USC		–		3	–	1	–	1
New Mexico A&M		–		4	–	2	–	0
Utah Agricultural		–		4	–	2	–	0
Utah		–		4	–	2	–	1
Montana		–		1	–	3	–	1
Wyoming		–		1	–	2	–	0

The 1908 University of New Mexico football team was an American football team represented the University of New Mexico as an independent during the 1908 college football season. The team compiled a 5–1 record and outscored all opponents by a total of 111 to 34. Walter R. Allen was the team captain.

Hermon H. Conwell was the first-year head coach. Conwell was a graduate of Kansas Agricultural College who was hired in 1908 and placed in charge of the mathematics department.

On November 13, the team defeated the New Mexico Military by a 16–12 score in Roswell, New Mexico. The Roswell Daily Record noted: "This was the first strictly college foot-ball game ever played in Roswell. It is the start of college athletics, and the lovers of this sort of sport are hoping that the spirit will grow."

On November 22, the team played its annual rivalry game against New Mexico Agricultural College (later renamed New Mexico State University). The university team won the game by a 10–6 score, the first victory for the university over the Aggies since 1894. Fullback Welcher drop-kicked a field goal for four points in the first half, and each team scored a touchdown in the second half.

On Thanksgiving Day, November 26, the team played Arizona in a game that matched two undefeated teams. Arizona had not allowed any of its prior opponents to score a point and won the game by a 10–5 score. The Albuquerque Morning Journal called it "very decidedly the best football game ever seen in New Mexico or Arizona". The game was also the first meeting between the two universities, marking the start of the Arizona–New Mexico football rivalry.

== Schedule ==
Date	Opponent	Site	Result	Attendance	Source
October 24	Albuquerque Indian School	Traction Park; Albuquerque, New Mexico Territory	W 37–0		
October 31	Albuquerque Indian School	Traction Park; Albuquerque, New Mexico Territory	W 12–6		
November 7	Socorro School of Mines	Traction Park; Albuquerque, New Mexico Territory	W 31–0	200	
November 13	at New Mexico Military	Institute gridiron; Roswell, New Mexico Territory	W 16–12		
November 21	at New Mexico Agricultural	Mesilla Park; Las Cruces, New Mexico Territory (rivalry)	W 10–6	350	
November 26	Arizona	Traction Park; Albuquerque, New Mexico Territory (rivalry)	L 5–10	2,000	
