= 1908 Utah Agricultural Aggies football team =

American college football season

1908 Utah Agricultural Aggies football
- Conference: Independent
- Record: 4–2
- Head coach: Fred M. Walker (2nd season)
- Home stadium: U.A.C. athletic field

1908 Western college football independents records
	Conf.			Overall
Team	W	L	T	W		L		T
Arizona		–		5	–	0	–	0
New Mexico		–		5	–	1	–	0
Montana Agricultural		–		3	–	1	–	2
USC		–		3	–	1	–	1
New Mexico A&M		–		4	–	2	–	0
Utah Agricultural		–		4	–	2	–	0
Utah		–		4	–	2	–	1
Montana		–		1	–	3	–	1
Wyoming		–		1	–	2	–	0

The 1908 Utah Agricultural Aggies football team was an American football team that represented Utah Agricultural College (later renamed Utah State University) during the 1908 college football season. In their second and final season under head coach Fred M. Walker, the Aggies compiled a 4–2 record and outscored opponents by a total of 142 to 39.

Walker went on to play Major League Baseball from 1910 to 1915. He became known as "Mysterious" Walker.

== Schedule ==
Date	Opponent	Site	Result	Attendance	Source
September 26	Salt Lake High School	U.A.C. athletic field; Logan, UT	W 52–0		
October 3	All Hallows College	U.A.C. athletic field; Logan, UT	W 33–6		
October 10	Ogden High School	U.A.C. athletic field; Logan, UT	W 29–0		
October 17	Logan All Stars	U.A.C. athletic field; Logan, UT	W 24–0		
October 24	Colorado Mines	U.A.C. athletic field; Logan, UT	L 4–22	1,200	
November 14	at St. Vincent's (CA)	Fiesta Park; Los Angeles, CA	L 0–11	3,500	
