= A. G. Harbaugh =

American college football coach

Biographical details
- Born: October 21, 1872; Roseville, Iowa, or Roseville, Illinois, U.S.
- Died: March 14, 1934 (aged 61); Phoenix, Arizona, U.S.

Coaching career (HC unless noted)
- 1901: Montana Agricultural
- 1905: Montana Agricultural

Head coaching record
- Overall: 3–3–1

Arthur Granville Harbaugh (October 21, 1872 – March 14, 1934) was an American college football coach, assayer, and chemist.

Harbaugh born in Roseville, Iowa, or Roseville, Illinois (sources conflict), the son of James Alexander Harbaugh. He attended Knox College in Galesburg, Illinois, receiving a bachelor of arts degree in 1900.

Harbaugh served as the head football coach at the Agricultural College of the State of Montana (later renamed Montana State University) during the 1901 and 1905 seasons. He compiled a 3–3–1 record as the football coach at Montana Agricultural.

Professionally, Harbaugh was an assayer and chemist. He worked for the Hearst Mines in Durango, Mexico, and later for the American Smelting and Refining Company in Madison County, Montana. After the 1905 football season, he took a job as an assayer in Tonopah, Arizona. He became the chief assayer for the Goldfield Consolidated Mines Company. In 1919, he formed the Union Assay Company.

Harbaugh was married to Nellie Grimes in 1904. In 1934, he died at the Arizona State Hospital in Phoenix, Arizona; the cause of death was pulmonary tuberculosis.

== Head coaching record ==
Year	Team	Overall	Conference	Standing	Bowl/playoffs
Montana Agricultural (Independent) (1901)
1901	Montana Agricultural	2–1			
Montana Agricultural (Independent) (1905)
1905	Montana Agricultural	1–2–1			
Montana Agricultural:		3–3–1			
Total:		3–3–1			
