= 1908 Montana football team =

American college football season

1908 Montana football
- Conference: Independent
- Record: 1–3–1
- Head coach: Roy White (1st season)

1908 Western college football independents records
	Conf.			Overall
Team	W	L	T	W		L		T
Arizona		–		5	–	0	–	0
New Mexico		–		5	–	1	–	0
Montana Agricultural		–		3	–	1	–	2
USC		–		3	–	1	–	1
New Mexico A&M		–		4	–	2	–	0
Utah Agricultural		–		4	–	2	–	0
Utah		–		4	–	2	–	1
Montana		–		1	–	3	–	1
Wyoming		–		1	–	2	–	0

The 1908 Montana football team represented the University of Montana in the 1908 college football season. They were led by first-year head coach Roy White, and finished the season with a record of one win, three losses and one tie (1–2–1).

== Schedule ==
Date	Opponent	Site	Result	Source
October 10	Montana Agricultural	Missoula, MT (rivalry)	T 0–0	
October 17	Montana Mines	Missoula, MT	W 8–5	
October 31	Missoula All-Stars	Missoula, MT	L 12–13	
November 6	at Montana Mines	Butte, MT	L 4–5	
November 20	at Montana Agricultural	Bozeman, MT	L 0–5	
