= Thanksgiving Day Disaster =

Deadliest accident at a sporting event in U.S. history

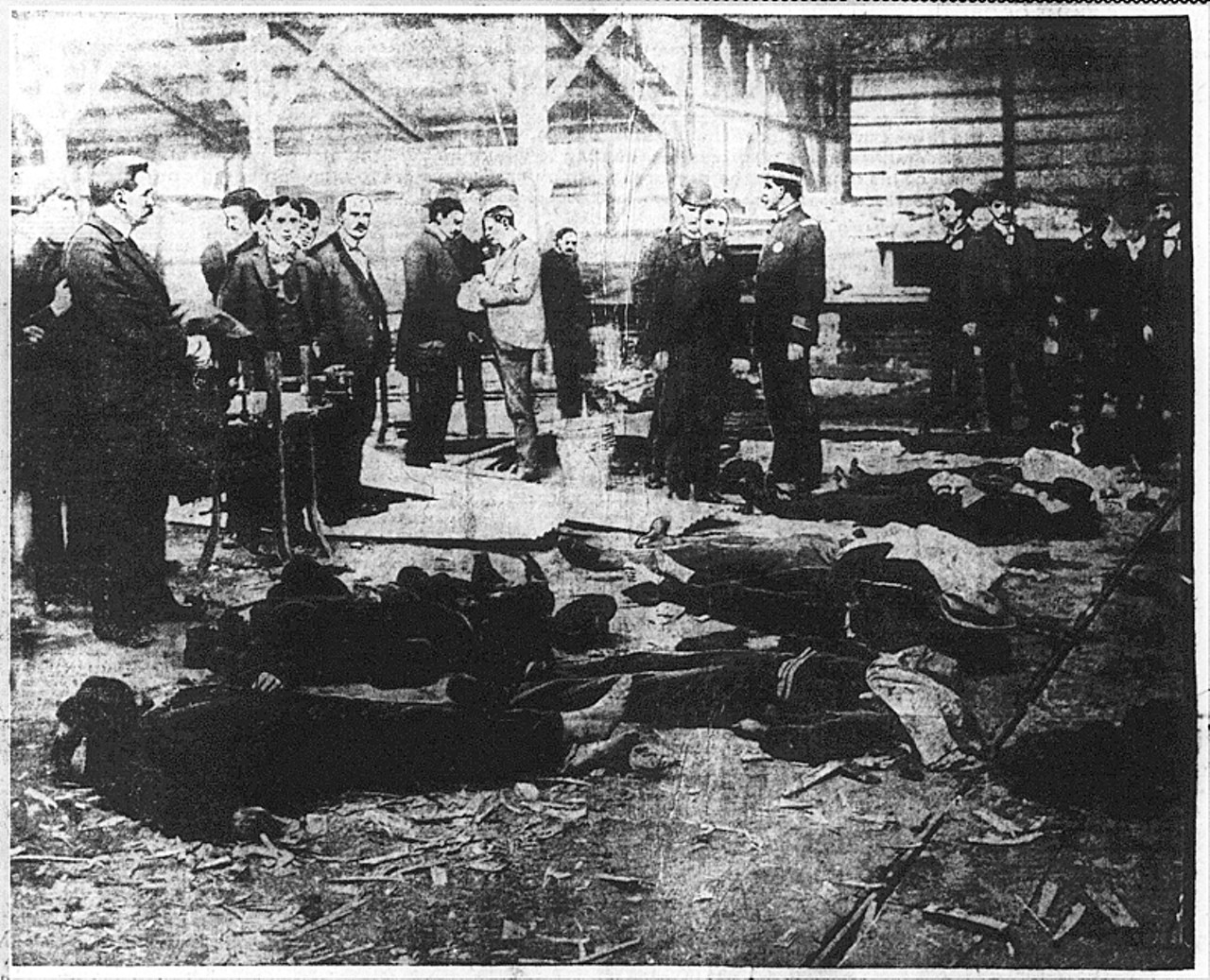
- Victims of the disaster
- Date: November 29, 1900
- Venue: 16th and Folsom Grounds
- Location: San Francisco, California, U.S.; 37°46′02″N 122°24′50″W
- Type: Building collapse
- Cause: Overcrowding on factory roof
- Participants: Spectators at the Big Game
- Deaths: 23
- Injuries: Over 100

On November 29, 1900, the roof of a glassblowing factory collapsed, killing 23 people and injuring over 100 more. Many spectators fell onto a furnace below the roof after it collapsed. The crowd had gathered upon the roof to watch the annual college football game between the California Golden Bears and the Stanford Cardinal (colloquially known as the Big Game) for free, not wanting to pay the $1 entrance fee (equivalent to $40 today). The disaster remains one of the deadliest accidents at a sporting event in U.S. history.

== Background ==
Every year since 1892, the University of California, Berkeley, and the Stanford University football teams have played an annual game towards the end of November or the beginning of December. The event has become known as The Big Game.

The early games in the series were played in San Francisco. Those games suffered at least two calamities. At the 1897 game, portions of a packed grandstand collapsed under the weight of spectators. Nobody was killed, but a 10-year-old boy was hospitalized.

In 1900, the game took place at the former California League baseball grounds, which local newspapers called the 16th and Folsom Grounds, on Thanksgiving Day, which at the time was the last Thursday in November. The stadium was located in a heavily industrial part of San Francisco. After the 1903 game, the event's location would alternate between the two schools' campuses.

== The disaster ==
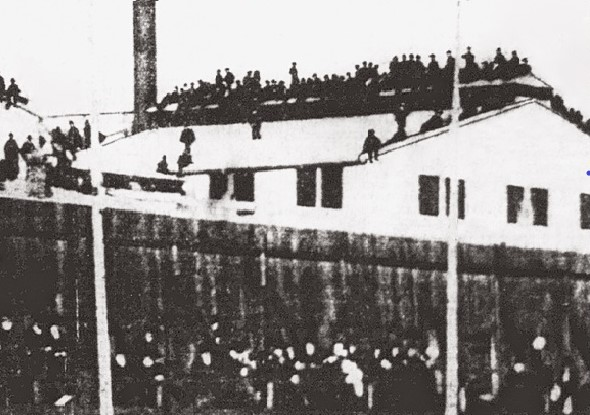
Spectators on the roof before the collapse

On the day of the 1900 game, the San Francisco and Pacific Glass Works company had just opened a new building across 15th Street from the stadium. Because the factory was brand new, only one furnace was active that day. The remaining furnaces were not scheduled to start until the following Monday. The furnace was 30 by 60 feet (9.1 by 18.3 m) and was filled with 15 short tons (14 t) of molten glass with a temperature of 3,000 °F (1,650 °C). It was enclosed by a series of binding rods that resembled croquet hoops.

The kickoff took place at 2:30 p.m. with a crowd of 19,000 spectators watching in the stadium, with thousands more watching in the street. A group of 500 to 1000 people who did not want to pay $1 for a ticket gathered on the factory's roof to watch for free. Factory employees tried to phone the police to turn back the crowd but were instead told to speak to the game's lieutenant. However, the officers stationed at the stadium denied them entry.

The peak of the factory's roof was topped by a ventilator which ran the length of the building, and was not intended to hold the weight of hundreds of people. Approximately 20 minutes after kickoff, the ventilator roof collapsed due to the excessive load.

Of the hundreds of people on the roof, at least 100 people fell four stories to the factory floor. Sixty to 100 more people fell directly on top of the furnace, the surface temperature of which was estimated to be around 500 °F (260 °C). Had the people broken through the furnace, their bodies would have been consumed by the molten glass. Many of the spectators were pinned by the binding rods to the surface of the furnace, making escape more difficult. Fuel pipes were also severed, spraying many victims with scalding hot oil. The fuel also ignited, setting many bodies on fire. Factory employees worked to remove bodies from the furnace, using metal poles to poke bodies out of reach.

Despite the incident, the game continued, with Stanford winning.

== Victims ==
Thirteen people were killed on the day of the disaster, with nine more dying in hospitals in the days that followed. A 28-year-old man succumbed to his injuries three years after the disaster, bringing the final death toll to 23. All of the victims were male, and most were children.

No physical memorial to the disaster exists, save for a cross at one 12-year-old boy's grave. The site of the disaster is now occupied by a UCSF building.

== Aftermath ==
Many American newspapers reported the incident on the front page. Most of the content in the sports sections was about the game itself. The San Francisco Chronicle referred to the event as the "closest and most exciting game of football ever played by the elevens of the two California universities." Writers for the student newspapers at both universities also paid little attention to the disaster. A trial was held to determine responsibility for the disaster, and its jury declared that the victims were responsible, stating that "no one can be held responsible for their deaths other than themselves".

The San Francisco Call referred to the incident as "perhaps the most horrifying accident that ever happened in San Francisco".
