= Mesilla Park, New Mexico =

Mesilla Park
- Neighborhood
- Location within the state of New Mexico Mesilla Park (the United States)
- Coordinates: 32°16′33″N 106°46′00″W
- Country: United States
- State: New Mexico
- County: Doña Ana
- Elevation: 3,878 ft (1,182 m)
- Time zone: UTC-7 (Mountain (MST))
  - Summer (DST): UTC-6 (MDT)
- ZIP codes: 88047
- Area code: 575
- GNIS feature ID: 899786

Mesilla Park is a neighborhood located on the south side of Las Cruces, New Mexico, United States. Residents of Mesilla founded the community through a land company in 1887, shortly after Las Cruces became the county seat of Doña Ana County. At the time, it was an independent settlement, though it was eventually annexed by Las Cruces. The neighborhood adjoins University Park, the site of New Mexico State University, and it grew after the university was founded in 1889. Mesilla Park still has its own post office with ZIP code 88047, which opened in 1892.
