= Reliance Athletic Club =

Coordinates: 37°48′26″N 122°16′21″W

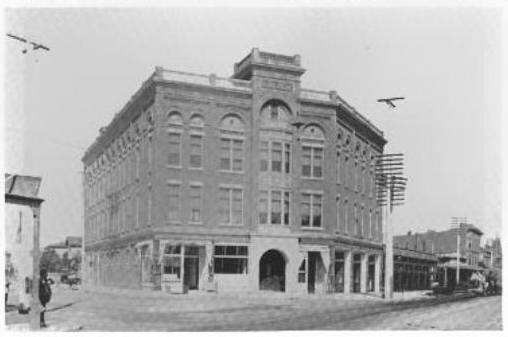
- Reliance Athletic Club building, 1898
- Full name: Reliance Athletic Club
- Founded: 1885 (dissolved 1910)

The Reliance Athletic Club was an athletic club and gentlemen's club in Oakland, California, United States. Founded in 1885, the organization grew rapidly as it added other sports and social activities, reaching its peak in the mid-1890s before financial troubles led to its bankruptcy and disestablishment in 1910.

== History and activities ==
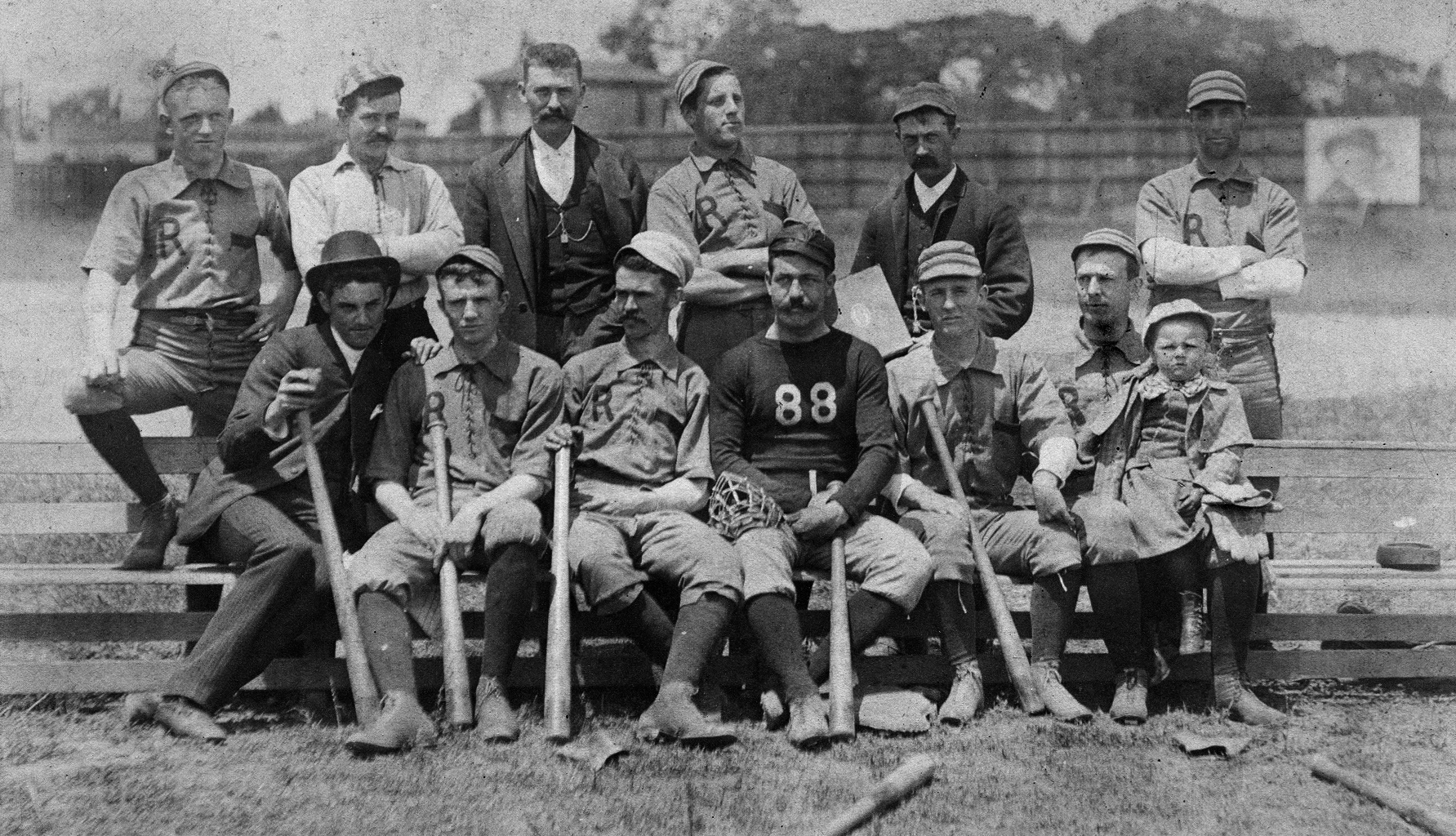
Reliance baseball team, c. 1895

The club was founded as a baseball club in 1885 in downtown Oakland. The club's focus was on developing physical fitness for its members in its gymnasium, including sports such as boxing and fencing.

Football teams representing the club competed with other west coast athletic clubs, including the Olympic Club of San Francisco and the Multnomah Athletic Club of Portland, Oregon, and also played college teams, most commonly those of Stanford and California.

The club was one of several in the Bay Area that trained young boxers, and the club staged regular boxing events at its facilities. In 1905, the club organized and sponsored an outdoor track and field meet. In addition to sports, club members played billiards and card games and hosted social events to which women were also invited.

== Growth ==
The club moved several times to various locations around Oakland as it grew. The club was incorporated in 1892 with a membership of 300, and by 1893, had 350 members and held a gala affair as it moved into a three-story building at the corner of San Pablo Avenue and 17th Street. The club remained in this facility into the first decade of the 20th century, but after the 1906 San Francisco earthquake was forced to relocate to accommodate San Francisco businesses that moved to Oakland when their buildings were destroyed. The new location was renovated in early 1907, but by the summer of 1907, the club had moved again near the Piedmont Baths.

== Demise and legacy ==
By 1910, the club had moved several more times but was apparently facing financial difficulties; in August 1910, a contractor sued the members for $2,300 owed to him. With no money in the treasury, the club declared bankruptcy and dissolved the organization.

The building at 17th and San Pablo in which the club was at its peak was converted to the Reliance Theater in 1916. The theater was later known as the American Theater and finally the Esquire Theater. The building was demolished in the 1950s to make way for a Mel's Drive-In.
