= 1904 University of New Mexico football team =

American college football season

1904 University of New Mexico football
- Conference: Independent
- Record: 1–0
- Head coach: Walter McEwan (2nd season)
- Captain: Thomas S. Bell

1904 Far West college football independents records
	Conf.			Overall
Team	W	L	T	W		L		T
Utah		–		7	–	1	–	0
Stanford		–		7	–	2	–	1
California		–		6	–	1	–	1
USC		–		6	–	1	–	0
Idaho		–		2	–	1	–	0
Oregon		–		5	–	3	–	0
Tempe Normal		–		4	–	0	–	0
Wyoming		–		4	–	1	–	1
Washington		–		4	–	2	–	1
Arizona		–		3	–	1	–	2
Oregon Agricultural		–		4	–	2	–	0
Montana		–		3	–	2	–	0
Nevada State		–		3	–	3	–	0
Washington Agricultural		–		2	–	2	–	0
New Mexico A&M		–		1	–	2	–	1
Utah Agricultural		–		4	–	8	–	0

The 1904 University of New Mexico football team was an American football team that represented the University of Dayton as an independent during the 1904 college football season. In its second and final season under head coach Walter McEwan, the team compiled a 1–0 record.

== Schedule ==
Date	Opponent	Site	Result	Source
October 19	Menaul School	Albuquerque, New Mexico Territory	W 11–0	
