= 1904 Cheney Normal football team =

American college football season

1904 Cheney Normal football
- Conference: Independent
- Record: 1–6
- Head coach: Henry E. Smith (1st season)

1904 Far West college football independents records
	Conf.			Overall
Team	W	L	T	W		L		T
Utah		–		7	–	1	–	0
Stanford		–		7	–	2	–	1
California		–		6	–	1	–	1
USC		–		6	–	1	–	0
Idaho		–		2	–	1	–	0
Montana Agricultural		–		2	–	1	–	0
Oregon		–		5	–	3	–	0
Tempe Normal		–		4	–	0	–	0
Wyoming		–		4	–	1	–	1
Washington		–		4	–	2	–	1
Arizona		–		3	–	1	–	2
Oregon Agricultural		–		4	–	2	–	0
Montana		–		3	–	2	–	0
Nevada State		–		3	–	3	–	0
Washington Agricultural		–		2	–	2	–	0
New Mexico A&M		–		1	–	2	–	1
Utah Agricultural		–		4	–	8	–	0
Cheney Normal		–		1	–	6	–	0

The 1904 Cheney Normal football team represented the State Normal School at Cheney—now known as Eastern Washington University—as an independent during the 1904 college football season. Led by Henry E. Smith in his first season as head coach, Cheney Normal compiled a record of 1–6.

== Schedule ==
Date	Opponent	Site	Result	Source
October 1	Blair Business	Cheney, WA	L 0–11	
October 8	Colfax High School	Cheney, WA	L 0–16	
October 22	at Blair Business	Natatorium Park; Spokane, WA	L 0–21	
October 29	Garfield High School	Cheney, WA	L 0–5	
November 11	at Colfax High School	Colfax, WA	L 0–6	
November 12	at Garfield High School	Seattle, WA	W 5–0	
November 19	at Spokane High School	Natatorium Park; Spokane, WA	L 4–34	
