= 1906 Cheney Normal football team =

American college football season

1906 Cheney Normal football
- Conference: Independent
- Record: 5–3
- Head coach: Paul Lienau (1st season)

1906 Western college football independents records
	Conf.			Overall
Team	W	L	T	W		L		T
Washington State		–		6	–	0	–	0
New Mexico A&M		–		4	–	0	–	0
Oregon		–		5	–	0	–	1
Colorado Mines		–		3	–	0	–	2
Utah		–		4	–	1	–	0
New Mexico		–		3	–	1	–	0
USC		–		2	–	0	–	2
Utah Agricultural		–		3	–	1	–	0
Oregon Agricultural		–		4	–	1	–	2
Washington		–		4	–	1	–	4
Cheney Normal		–		5	–	3	–	0
Wyoming		–		1	–	1	–	0
Idaho		–		2	–	4	–	0
Montana		–		2	–	4	–	0
Tempe Normal		–		0	–	2	–	0

The 1906 Cheney Normal football team represented the State Normal School at Cheney—now known as Eastern Washington University—as an independent during the 1906 college football season. Led by Paul Lienau in his first season as head coach, Cheney Normal compiled a record of 5–3.

== Schedule ==
Date	Opponent	Site	Result	Source
October 6	Blair Business	Cheney, WA	L 0–6	
October 13	Garfield High School	Cheney, WA	W 15–0	
October 20	Davenport High School	Cheney, WA	W 6–0	
October 27	at Coeur d'Alene High School	Coeur d'Alene, ID	L 5–10	
November 3	at Ritzville High School	Ritzville, WA	W 22–0	
November 9	at Colfax High School	Colfax, WA	W 15–0	
November 10	at Garfield High School	Seattle, WA	L 0–6	
November 29	Lewiston State Normal	Cheney, WA	W 30–5	
