= 1907 Cheney Normal football team =

American college football season

1907 Cheney Normal football
- Conference: Independent
- Record: 3–2
- Head coach: Paul Lienau (2nd season)

1907 Western college football independents records
	Conf.			Overall
Team	W	L	T	W		L		T
Oregon Agricultural		–		6	–	0	–	0
New Mexico A&M		–		3	–	0	–	0
New Mexico		–		1	–	0	–	0
Washington State		–		7	–	1	–	0
Colorado Mines		–		5	–	1	–	0
Oregon		–		5	–	1	–	0
USC		–		5	–	1	–	0
Utah Agricultural		–		5	–	1	–	0
Idaho		–		3	–	1	–	2
Montana		–		4	–	1	–	1
Utah		–		4	–	2	–	0
Cheney Normal		–		3	–	2	–	0
Wyoming		–		2	–	1	–	0
Gonzaga		–		0	–	0	–	1
Washington		–		4	–	4	–	2

The 1907 Cheney Normal football team represented the State Normal School at Cheney—now known as Eastern Washington University—as an independent during the 1907 college football season. Led by Paul Lienau in his second and final season as head coach, Cheney Normal compiled a record of 3–2.

== Schedule ==
Date	Opponent	Site	Result	Source
October 5	at Washington State	Rogers Field; Pullman, WA	L 0–46	
October 26	Davenport High School	Cheney, WA	W 10–0	
November 8	Blair Business	Cheney, WA	W 6–0	
November 15	at Davenport High School	Davenport, WA	W 6–4	
November 23	at Blair Business	Natatorium Park; Spokane, WA	L 0–5	
