= 1907 Washington football team =

American college football season

1907 Washington football
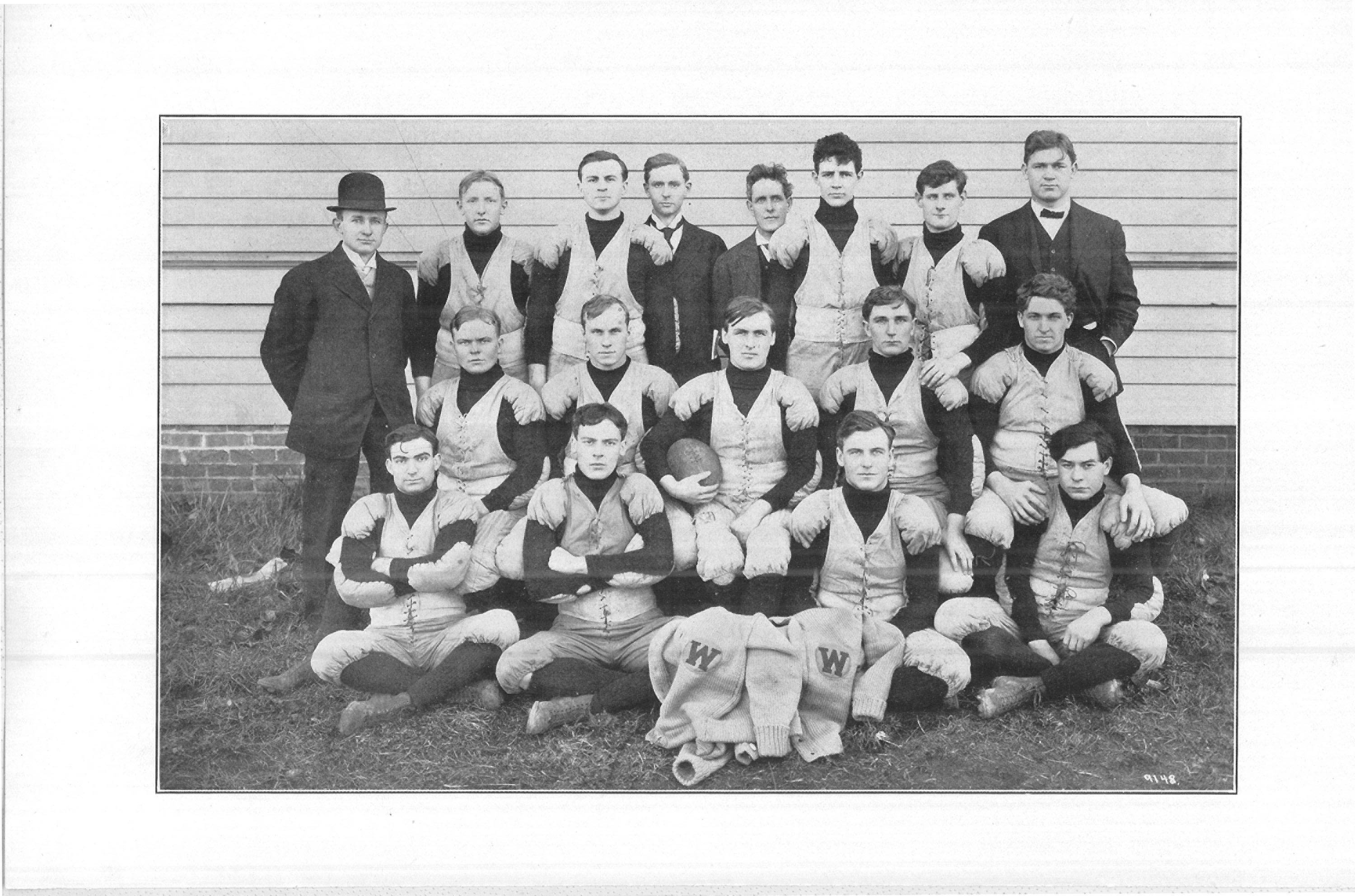
- Conference: Independent
- Record: 4–4–2
- Head coach: Victor M. Place (2nd season)
- Captain: Enoch Bagshaw
- Home stadium: Denny Field

1907 Western college football independents records
	Conf.			Overall
Team	W	L	T	W		L		T
Oregon Agricultural		–		6	–	0	–	0
New Mexico A&M		–		3	–	0	–	0
New Mexico		–		1	–	0	–	0
Washington State		–		7	–	1	–	0
Colorado Mines		–		5	–	1	–	0
Oregon		–		5	–	1	–	0
USC		–		5	–	1	–	0
Utah Agricultural		–		5	–	1	–	0
Idaho		–		3	–	1	–	2
Montana		–		4	–	1	–	1
Utah		–		4	–	2	–	0
Cheney Normal		–		3	–	2	–	0
Wyoming		–		2	–	1	–	0
Gonzaga		–		0	–	0	–	1
Washington		–		4	–	4	–	2

The 1907 Washington football team was an American football team that represented the University of Washington as an independent during the 1907 college football season. In its second season under coach Victor M. Place, the team compiled a 4–4–2 record and outscored its opponents by a combined total of 96 to 48. Enoch Bagshaw was the team captain.

Following this season, Washington did not lose a game for a decade.

== Schedule ==
Date	Opponent	Site	Result	Attendance	Source
October 5	Seattle High School	Denny Field; Seattle, WA	T 0–0	2,000	
October 12	at Multnomah Athletic Club	Multnomah Field; Portland, OR	W 10–0	1,000	
October 14	at Willamette	Salem, OR	W 21–0	1,000	
October 19	at Whitworth	Tacoma, WA	W 5–0	350	
October 26	Chemawa	Denny Field; Seattle, WA	W 40–0	1,000	
November 2	USS Nebraska	Denny Field; Seattle, WA	L 6–19	1,000	
November 8	at Whitman	Walla Walla, WA	L 8–12	400	
November 16	Oregon	Denny Field; Seattle, WA (rivalry)	L 0–6	2,500	
November 21	Washington State	Denny Field; Seattle, WA (rivalry)	L 5–11	3,000	
November 28	Idaho	Denny Field; Seattle, WA	T 0–0	3,000	
