= 1907 Washington State football team =

American college football season

1907 Washington State football
- Conference: Independent
- Record: 7–1
- Head coach: John R. Bender (2nd season)
- Captain: L. H. Nissen
- Home stadium: Rogers Field

1907 Western college football independents records
	Conf.			Overall
Team	W	L	T	W		L		T
Oregon Agricultural		–		6	–	0	–	0
New Mexico A&M		–		3	–	0	–	0
New Mexico		–		1	–	0	–	0
Washington State		–		7	–	1	–	0
Colorado Mines		–		5	–	1	–	0
Oregon		–		5	–	1	–	0
USC		–		5	–	1	–	0
Utah Agricultural		–		5	–	1	–	0
Idaho		–		3	–	1	–	2
Montana		–		4	–	1	–	1
Utah		–		4	–	2	–	0
Cheney Normal		–		3	–	2	–	0
Wyoming		–		2	–	1	–	0
Gonzaga		–		0	–	0	–	1
Washington		–		4	–	4	–	2

The 1907 Washington State football team was an American football team that represented Washington State College during the 1907 college football season. The team competed as an independent under head coach John R. Bender, compiling a record of 7–1.

== Schedule ==
Date	Opponent	Site	Result	Attendance	Source
October 5	Cheney Normal	Rogers Field; Pullman, WA	W 46–0		
October 12	Blair College	Rogers Field; Pullman, WA	W 86–0		
October 18	Montana	Rogers Field; Pullman, WA	W 38–0		
October 26	Spokane Athletic Club	Rogers Field; Pullman, WA	W 70–0		
November 8	at Idaho	Moscow, ID (rivalry)	L 4–5	2,000	
November 21	at Washington	Denny Field; Seattle, WA (rivalry)	W 11–5	3,000	
November 28	at Whitman	Walla Walla, WA	W 16–8	2,000	
December 25	vs. Saint Louis	Natatorium Park; Spokane, WA	W 11–0	3,000–5,000	
