= List of Montana Grizzlies basketball head coaches =

The following is a list of Montana Grizzlies basketball head coaches. There have been 25 head coaches of the Grizzlies in their 118-season history.

Montana's current head coach is Travis DeCuire. He was hired as the Grizzlies' head coach in May 2014, replacing Wayne Tinkle, who left to become the head coach at Oregon State.

No.	Tenure	Coach	Years	Record	Pct.
–	1901–1904	No coach	3	2–2	.500
1	1905–1907	Frederick Schule	2	6–4	.600
2	1907–1909	Albion Findlay	2	6–3	.667
3	1911–1912	Albert N. Whitlock	1	1–6	.143
4	1912–1914	W. H. Mustaine	2	8–11	.421
5	1914–1918	Jerry Nissen	4	21–26	.447
6	1919–1922	Bernie Bierman	3	32–24	.571
7	1922–1932	John W. Stewart	10	77–107	.418
8	1932–1937	Adolph J. Lewandowski	5	57–61–1	.483
9	1937–1942; 1944–1955	George Dahlberg	16	221–223	.498
10	1942–1943	Clyde Carpenter and Ed Chinske	1	15–9	.625
11	1943–1944	Ed Buzzetti	1	2–10	.167
12	1955–1962	Frosty Cox	7	80–73	.523
13	1962–1968	Ron Nord	6	51–95	.349
14	1968–1970	Bob Cope	2	13–34	.277
15	1970–1971	Lou Rocheleau	1	9–15	.375
16	1971–1976	Jud Heathcote	5	80–53	.602
17	1976–1978 (Note: Montana forfeited 11 wins from the 1976–77 season. Brandenburg's on-court record is 37–18 (.673).)	Jim Brandenburg	2	26–29	.473
18	1978–1986	Mike Montgomery	8	155–76	.671
19	1986–1991	Stew Morrill	5	98–51	.658
20	1991–1998	Blaine Taylor	7	141–66	.681
21	1998–2002	Don Holst	4	57–56	.504
22	2002–2004	Pat Kennedy	2	23–35	.397
23	2004–2006	Larry Krystkowiak	2	42–20	.677
24	2006–2014	Wayne Tinkle	8	158–91	.635
25	2014–present	Travis DeCuire	9	177–112	.612
Totals		25 coaches	118 seasons	1,558–1,292–1	.547
Records updated through end of 2022–23 season Source
