= 1907 Oregon Agricultural Aggies football team =

American college football season

1907 Oregon Agricultural Aggies football

Champion of the Northwest Champion of the Pacific Coast
- Conference: Independent
- Record: 6–0
- Head coach: Fred Norcross (2nd season)
- Captain: Frank Pendergrass
- Home stadium: OAC Field

1907 Western college football independents records
	Conf.			Overall
Team	W	L	T	W		L		T
Oregon Agricultural		–		6	–	0	–	0
New Mexico A&M		–		3	–	0	–	0
New Mexico		–		1	–	0	–	0
Washington State		–		7	–	1	–	0
Colorado Mines		–		5	–	1	–	0
Oregon		–		5	–	1	–	0
USC		–		5	–	1	–	0
Utah Agricultural		–		5	–	1	–	0
Idaho		–		3	–	1	–	2
Montana		–		4	–	1	–	1
Utah		–		4	–	2	–	0
Wyoming		–		2	–	1	–	0
Gonzaga		–		0	–	0	–	1
Washington		–		4	–	4	–	2

The 1907 Oregon Agricultural Aggies football team represented Oregon Agricultural College (now known as Oregon State University) as an independent during the 1907 college football season.

In their second season under head coach Fred Norcross, the Aggies compiled a perfect 6–0 record, did not allow any of their opponents to score, and outscored their opponents by a combined total of 137 to 0. The Aggies' victories included games against Oregon (4–0), the Pacific Boxers (49–0), and Willamette (42–0).

Oregon Agricultural's final game of the season, at St. Vincent's in Los Angeles, was a Thanksgiving Day matchup of the "champions" of the Northwest and the "champions" of California, with the winner taking home the "championship" of the entire West Coast. After beating St. Vincent's, the Aggies proclaimed themselves "Champions of the Pacific Coast".

The 1907 season remains the only perfect year in Oregon State history — with the team not allowing a single point scored against them. It remains, with the 1897 team, one of the two best-regarded OAC football squads of the early era.

== Background ==
Oregon Agricultural College (OAC), today's Oregon State University, celebrated its 20th anniversary as a school owned and operated by the state of Oregon in 1907–08. From its pre-history as a tiny religious school, Corvallis College, the school had grown dramatically over the ensuing two decades, with a total student body now exceeding 800 young men and women. The available pool of potential members of the school football team had expanded accordingly as coach Fred Norcross, quarterback and captain of the 1905 Michigan Wolverines team, entered his second season coaching the orange and black.

Norcross, hired as a coach just for football season, left his home in Michigan the evening of Saturday, September 14, and was slated to arrive in Corvallis about September 20.

A team was rapidly assembled for a planned October 12 debut against the Columbia Athletic Club of The Dalles at OAC Field in Corvallis. The main core of the 1906 team would be returning, including fullback and captain Frank Pendergrass, "Smiley" Emily, "Rat" Rineheart, Carl Wolfe, Walter Gagnon, James Dobbin, as well as Sam Bennett, a star tackle from the 1905 team, who was returning to school for the 1907-08 year.

A season finale was planned for Thanksgiving Day in Los Angeles against St. Vincent's College (today's Loyola Maymount University), which was touted as possibly "the only exhibition of the American game" to be played in California during the year, as both Stanford University and the University of California had substituted rugby for American football for the 1907-08 year.

== Schedule ==
Date	Opponent	Site	Result	Attendance	Source
October 12	Columbia Athletic Club	OAC Field; Corvallis, OR	Canceled		
October 12	OAC Alumni [intrasquad]	OAC Field; Corvallis, OR	L 6–11	500	
October 19	Astoria Athletic Club	OAC Field; Corvallis, OR	W 26–0		
October 26	Whitworth	OAC Field; Corvallis, OR	W 6–0		
November 2	Pacific (OR)	OAC Field; Corvallis, OR	W 49–0		
November 9	at Oregon	Kincaid Field; Eugene, OR (rivalry)	W 4–0		
November 16	Willamette	OAC Field; Corvallis, OR	W 42–0		
November 28	at St. Vincent's (CA)	Fiesta Park; Los Angeles, CA	W 10–0		

== Game summaries ==
=== October 12: OAC Alumni [intrasquad] ===
Although a game with the Columbia Athletic Club of The Dalles, Oregon, had been originally scheduled, unknown circumstances led to its cancellation and replacement with an exhibition game against OAC stars of yesteryear. Making an appearance were Rod Nash, Zophar Tharp, Darby, Swan, Bennett, and others. As less than a full team of former players were present, holes in the lineup were filled by members of the current team, including Rinehart, Emily, Looney, Eventon, Smith, and Dinges — making this essentially an intrasquad contest.

The co-mingled team of veterans and current roster players racked up two quick 5-point touchdowns and one successful goal from touchdown within the first four minutes, with Nash doing honors both times, taking an 11–0 lead that would hold up for the win. In the second half the varsity managed a touchdown of their own after a series of "straight football" running plays, with Carl Wolff crossing the goal line.

=== October 19: Astoria Athletic Club ===
Saturday, October 19 was the season opener for Fred Norcross' Oregon Agricultural College team as they welcomed the Astoria Athletic Club to Corvallis. The Orangemen did most of their damage in the first half, with Carl Wolff opening the scoring with a 30-yard field goal from placement after just four minutes of play. The 4–0 Aggie lead was rapidly expanded with touchdowns by Clarence Jamieson at the 10-minute mark, Roy Cooper at 18-minutes, and Carl Wolff at 23-minutes.

In the second half it took right halfback "Rat" Rinehart just 45 seconds to score the fourth and final touchdown for the Agrics, running the score to 26–0. The rest of the game was a punting duel between fullbacks Hoover of Astoria and Wolff of OAC, with the home team getting slightly the better of the battle.

=== November 2: Pacific University ===
Fullback and kicker Carl Wolff was the star of the 1907 Aggies team. He was elected captain of the 1908 squad.

The field was "heavy" and running hampered, but the Aggies handily dispatched visiting Pacific University of Forest Grove, Oregon, by a score of 49–0. Receiving the opening kickoff and taking it halfway down the field, the Orangemen took only five minutes to score their first touchdown, for a 5–0 lead. In their next possession, Samuel Bennett broke free for a 40-yard run for OAC, setting up a 30-yard field goal by Carl Wolff to stretch the lead to 9–0. The home team scored three more touchdowns in the first half against an out-manned Pacific team, taking a 26–0 lead to halftime.

The second half saw more of the same, with OAC spreading out its touchdowns to Finn, Bennett, Looney, and Cooper. Pacific made only one first-down on the day and never threatened to end the shutout, with the ball driven down to their 1-yard line again as time expired.

=== November 9: at University of Oregon ===
Corvallis was in a fever pitch for the 12th annual battle with the rivals from down the road, the University of Oregon Webfoots. A special excursion train of 18 cars was reserved to bring football fans to Kincaid Field to root on the Aggies. "There has never been more whole-souled enthusiasm manifested by the supporters of the Orange than was shown at the train this morning," one participant declared. More than 1,000 fans paid $1 each [$33.50 in 2025 dollars] for a ticket to ride the rails to Eugene — an assemblage which included "almost every student attending the college, the faculty, and many townspeople."

The atmosphere in Eugene was also electric, with a "practice of rooters," featuring a massive bonfire illuminated by a "multitude of Roman candles" and a "serpentine dance" of the Webfoot faithful, held on the eve of the big game. Every store in the city, save four, pledged to close business from 3 to 5 p.m. so that as many people as possible could attend the game's 3:15 kickoff.

The lemon yellow team went into the game with a sacred record: never had the varsity fallen to defeat on Kincaid Field. This record would end on this day. The first half was an even battle, with the teams marching one way up the field and back again, never scoring. Oregon used that new innovation, the forward pass, three times with effect, but the tactic proved the team's undoing on other occasions, leading to costly turnovers.

In the second half, it looked like OAC was going to score on a forward pass play to Coleman, who galloped 35 yards, only to be tackled by the turf monster as he tripped and fell. No points resulted from the drive. The game turned at the 14 minute mark, when OAC fullback Carl Wolff place-kicked a 30-yard goal down the middle of the posts for the 4 points that would both start and finish scoring for the day.

== Roster ==
The 1907 OAC Aggies football team from the 1908 Spalding Guide; the painted football proclaims the team "Pacific Coast Champions."

Team photo of the undefeated 1907 OAC Aggies

The OAC Barometer published a special 40-page "Football Number" in December 1907, celebrating the Pacific Coast championship of the Aggie team.

- Charles E. Barber
- Samuel Louis Bennett
- Ralph Cady
- Roy Cooper
- James Davis Dobbin
- William James Dunlap
- Joel "Smiley" Emily
- Clarence Jamieson
- John Waldo Finn
- Walter Clayton Gagnon
- Earle Paul Harding
- Elton Irwin Kelly
- Harold B. Looney
- Frank R. Pendergrass (captain)
- Harvey Earl "Rat" Rinehart
- Carl Wolff (captain-elect 1908)
- Benjamin H. Greenshaw (Manager)
- Heater (Trainer)
