= J. Arthur Baird =

American athlete, coach, college athletics administrator, lawyer, and judge

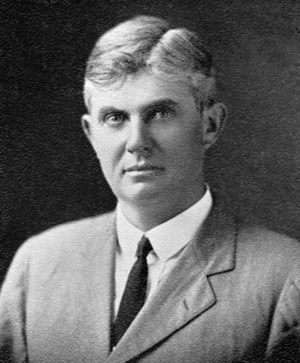
- Baird circa 1914

Biographical details
- Born: November 2, 1877; Ferris, Illinois, U.S.
- Died: July 26, 1964 (aged 86); Galesburg, Illinois, U.S.

Playing career

Football
- 1896–1899: Carthage
- 1900–1902: Northwestern
- Position: Guard

Coaching career (HC unless noted)

Football
- 1903–1905: Carleton
- 1906–1907: Whitman
- 1908–1914: Carthage

Basketball
- 1907–1914: Carthage

Baseball
- 1910–1916: Carthage

Administrative career (AD unless noted)
- 1907–1915: Carthage

Head coaching record
- Overall: 48–29–6 (football); 19–41 (basketball); 21–25–2 (baseball)

James Arthur Baird (November 2, 1877 – July 26, 1964) was an American football and baseball player, track athlete, coach of football, basketball, and baseball, college athletics administrator, lawyer, and Hancock County, Illinois, judge.

== Biography ==
Baird was born on November 2, 1877, in Ferris, Illinois, to Alexander Baird (1851–1916) and Allie May Moore (1853–1942). He graduated from Carthage College in 1900 and was the first athlete to letter in three sports in one season.

He next enrolled at Northwestern University School of Law and played college football there from 1900 to 1902. He played at the guard and center positions and also handled kicking for Northwestern. He was also a member of the Northwestern track team, competing in the pole vault and high jump, and was selected in June 1903 as captain of the track team.

He served as the head football coach at Carleton College from 1903 to 1905. He served as the head football coach at Whitman College from 1906 to 1907.

From 1908 to 1915, Baird served as the head football coach at Carthage College. He was also the head basketball coach at Carthage from 1906 to 1914 and the head baseball coach there from 1910 to 1914.

On June 23, 1913, Baird married Georgia Hubbs in New York. She died in 1917.

Baird was elected as a Hancock County, Illinois, judge in 1910 and served to 1914. When asked about the continuation of town meetings, he described them as: "not as effective as in olden times, but still stands ready to render us a service." He served a single term, and then returned to his private law practice. He was elected for a second four-year term in 1934 and he was re-elected in 1938, 1942, and in 1946. Baird retired from the bench when his final term expired in 1950.

Baird died on July 26, 1964, in Galesburg, Illinois. He was buried next to his wife.

== Head coaching record ==
=== Football ===
Year	Team	Overall	Conference	Standing	Bowl/playoffs
Carleton (Independent) (1903–1905)
1903	Carleton	6–1–2			
1904	Carleton	4–4			
1905	Carleton	6–0			
Carleton:		16–5–2			
Whitman Fighting Missionaries (Independent) (1906–1907)
1906	Whitman	4–2–1			
1907	Whitman	5–3			
Whitman:		9–5–1			
Carthage Red Men (Independent) (1908–1911)
1908	Carthage	2–3			
1909	Carthage	6–1–1			
1910	Carthage	2–4			
1911	Carthage	3–4–1			
Carthage Red Men (Illinois Intercollegiate Athletic Conference) (1912–1914)
1912	Carthage	5–2	2–1		
1913	Carthage	3–3–1	1–2		
1914	Carthage	3–2	1–2		
Carthage:		24–19–3	4–5		
Total:		48–29–6			
