= Fred Norcross =

American football player and coach (1884–1965)

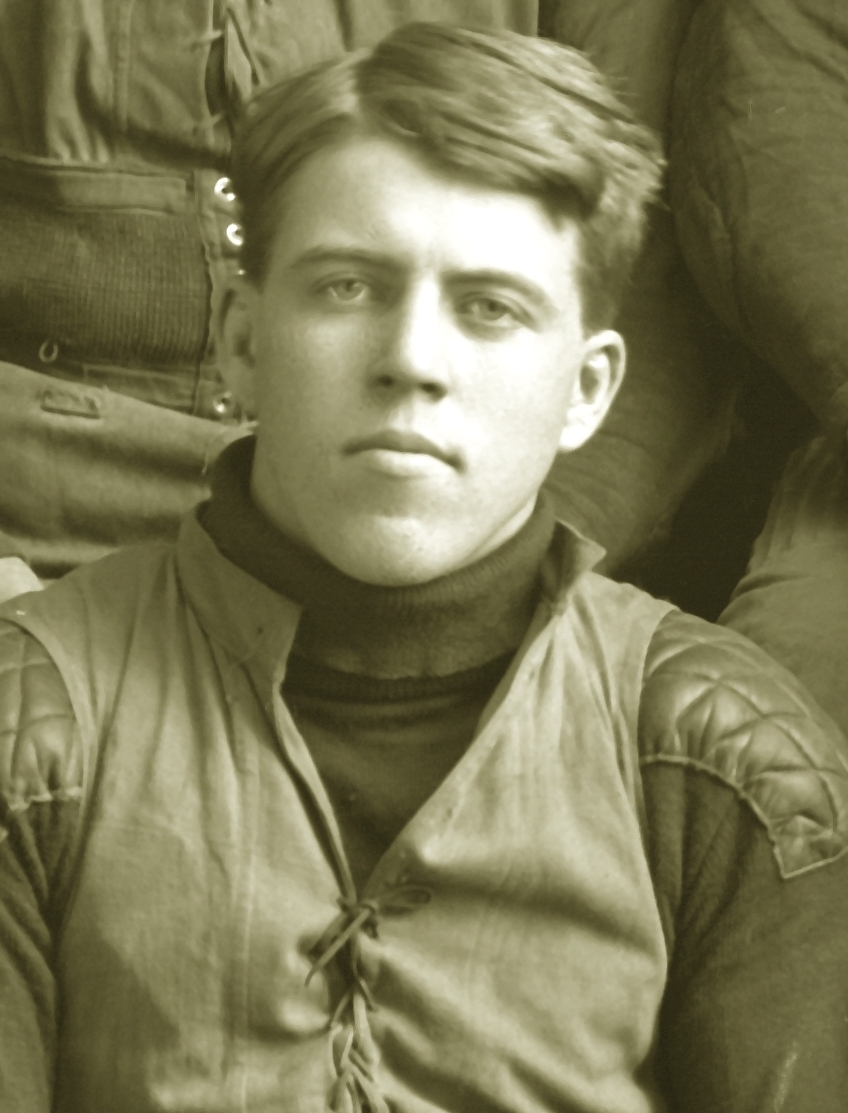
- Fred Norcross cropped from 1903 Michigan Wolverines team photograph

Biographical details
- Born: July 14, 1884; Menominee, Michigan, U.S.
- Died: April 4, 1965 (aged 80); Ann Arbor, Michigan, U.S.

Playing career
- 1903–1905: Michigan
- Position: Quarterback

Coaching career (HC unless noted)
- 1906–1908: Oregon Agricultural

Head coaching record
- Overall: 14–4–3

Accomplishments and honors

Championships
- Western United States (1907)

Fred Stephenson "Norky" Norcross Jr. (July 14, 1884 – April 4, 1965) was an American college football player and coach and mining engineer. He was the quarterback for the University of Michigan from 1903 to 1905, leading the team to a 33–1–1 record in three seasons, including national championships in 1903 and 1904. Norcross was the head football coach Oregon State University, then known as Oregon Agricultural College, from 1906 to 1908. After retiring from football, Norcross worked in the mining industry for more than 40 years, holding positions in British Columbia, Cuba, New Mexico, Mexico, New York, and the Upper Peninsula of Michigan. He also served as a major in the U.S. Army, 27th Engineers during World War I.

== Early years ==
Fred Stephenson Norcross Jr. was born in Menominee in Michigan's Upper Peninsula on July 14, 1884. His father, Fred S. Norcross Sr., was a native of Maine. His mother, Addie Maria (Knowles) Norcross, was also a native of Maine. At the time of the 1900 United States Census, Norcross was living with his parents and grandfather in Menominee. His grandfather's occupation was listed as "capitalist," and his father's as "co-treasurer."

== University of Michigan ==
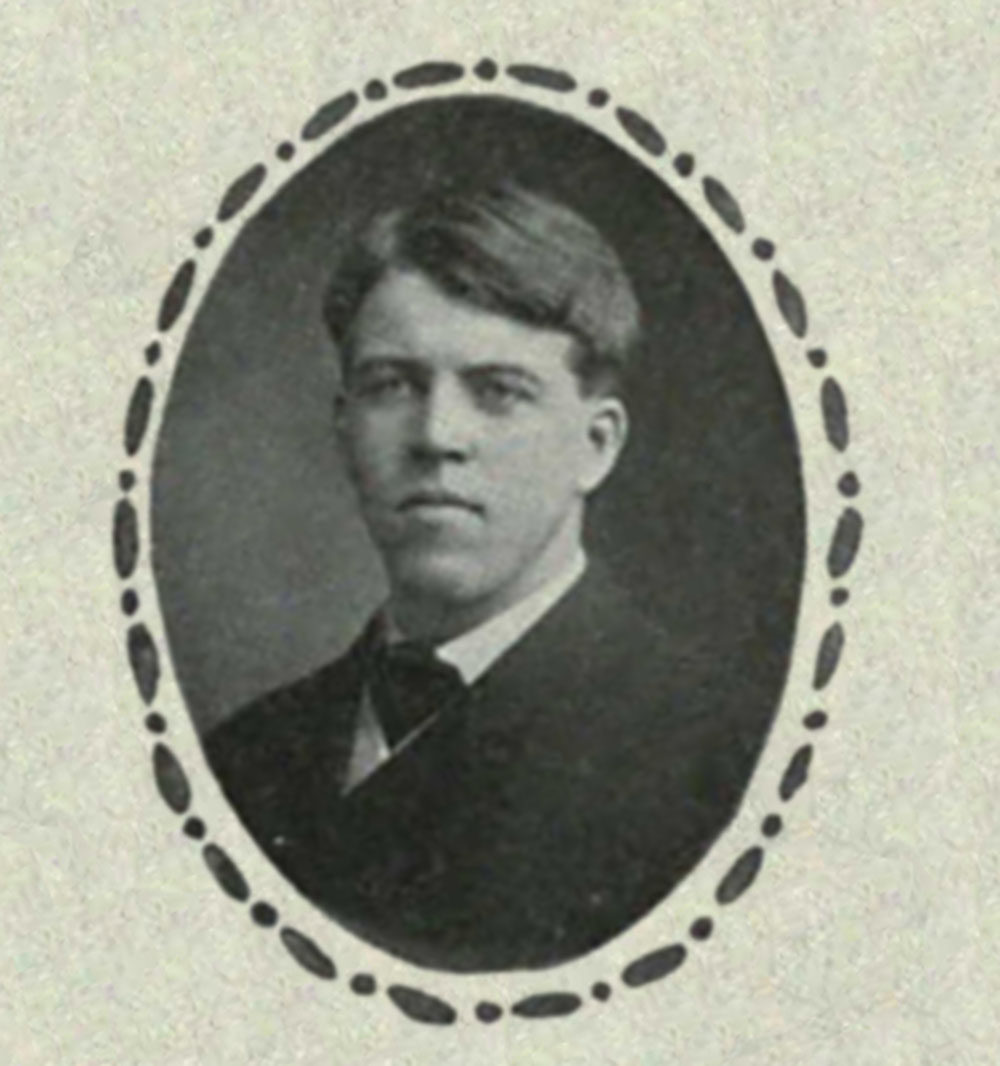
FS Norcross 1904

Norcross served as Presidend of the 1906 Engineering Class. He ran track (All Freshmen 1906 team) and played football at Michigan from 1903–1905. While at Michigan, Norcross played quarterback for the legendary Fielding H. Yost. In his three seasons as a player, the Wolverines were 33–1–1 and claimed national championships in 1903 and 1904. Norcross was named the team captain in 1905. Norcross received a BS in Engineering from the University of Michigan in 1906 and an ME from the Michigan School of Mines in 1908.

== Collegiate coaching ==
At the conclusion of his playing career, Norcross came to Corvallis, Oregon to become the head football coach at Oregon Agricultural College. Oregon Agricultural had begun their search for a coach in April, and settled late in the summer on Norcross, their third choice. This decision, however, turned out very well for the school. In his three seasons as the head coach from 1906 to 1908, Norcross posted an overall record of 14–4–3. In his first 72 quarters as coach, his team only gave up 4 points, a field goal in the final game of the 1906 season.

The 1907 season was his best and possibly the school's best ever. The team went 6–0, scored 137 points, gave up no points, and won the unofficial championship of the Western United States after beating St. Vincent's College, 10–0, in Los Angeles, California. This "perfect" season has never, and most likely will never be repeated.

== Mining business ==
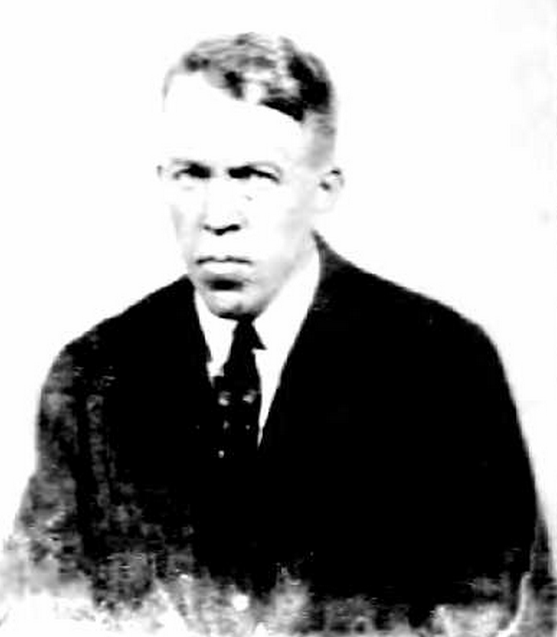
Norcross in 1921 passport photo

After one year as a college football coach, Norcross began a lengthy career in the mining business. By May 1909 he was the assistant superintendent of Gale Creek Coal and Coke Company in Wilkeson, Washington. The 1910 United States census shows Norcross still living there listed as a mining engineer.

From April 1912 to December 1917, Norcross lived in Greenwood and later Princeton, British Columbia. He worked at mining areas in British Columbia, Mexico and New Mexico.

During World War I, from 1917 to 1919, Norcross served as a major in the U.S. Army, 27th Engineers.

In May 1921, he applied for a passport to allow him to travel to Panama and Nicaragua as a mine examiner. He was employed at the time by the Goodrich Lockhart Company to examine some mining property in the company's interests.

At the time of the 1930 United States Census, Norcross was living in Plandome, New York. His occupation was listed as a mining engineer.

In 1939, Norcross was working as a mining superintendent in Cristo, Oriente, Cuba.

Norcross was elected vice president of the Freeport Sulphur Co. in 1948. He retired in approximately 1956.

== Family, death and posthumous honors ==
Norcross was born in Menominee, Michigan, the son of Fred Stevenson and Addie Maria (Knowles) Norcross Sr. He was married to Elizabeth Evans Jackman on November 6, 1923 in Menominee, Michigan. They had two children, Fred Stevenson Norcross III (1926–1990) and Robert Jackman Norcross (1929–2009). Norcross adopted his wife Elizabeth's child Mary Margaret Lloyd (1916-2014, daughter by her previous marriage to Frank Croskill Lloyd), the future Mrs. Ian MacIntosh.

In April 1965, Norcross died at age 81 at the University Hospital in Ann Arbor, Michigan. He was survived by his wife and two sons. His funeral was held in Menominee.

Norcross was inducted into the Upper Peninsula Sports Hall of Fame in 1972.

== Head coaching record ==
Year	Team	Overall	Conference	Standing	Bowl/playoffs
Oregon Agricultural Aggies (Independent) (1906–1908)
1906	Oregon Agricultural	4–1–2			
1907	Oregon Agricultural	6–0			
1908	Oregon Agricultural	4–3–1			
Oregon Agricultural:		14–4–3			
Total:		14–4–3			
