= 1906 USC Methodists football team =

American college football season

1906 USC Methodists football
- Conference: Independent
- Record: 2–0–2
- Head coach: Harvey Holmes (3rd season)
- Captain: Oliver Best
- Home stadium: Bovard Field

1906 Western college football independents records
	Conf.			Overall
Team	W	L	T	W		L		T
Washington State		–		6	–	0	–	0
New Mexico A&M		–		4	–	0	–	0
Oregon		–		5	–	0	–	1
Colorado Mines		–		3	–	0	–	2
Utah		–		4	–	1	–	0
New Mexico		–		3	–	1	–	0
USC		–		2	–	0	–	2
Utah Agricultural		–		3	–	1	–	0
Oregon Agricultural		–		4	–	1	–	2
Washington		–		4	–	1	–	4
Wyoming		–		1	–	1	–	0
Idaho		–		2	–	4	–	0
Montana		–		2	–	4	–	0
Tempe Normal		–		0	–	2	–	0

The 1906 USC Methodists football team was an American football team that represented the University of Southern California during the 1906 college football season. The team competed as an independent under head coach Harvey Holmes, compiling a 2–0–2 record.

== Schedule ==
Date	Time	Opponent	Site	Result	Attendance	Source
October 6	2:30 p.m.	vs. Los Angeles High School	Fiesta Park; Los Angeles, CA	T 0–0		
October 13	2:30 p.m.	Occidental	Bovard Field; Los Angeles, CA	W 22–0	4,000	
November 17		at Pomona	Claremont, CA	W 14–0		
November 29		vs. Sherman Institute	Fiesta Park; Los Angeles, CA	T 0–0	4,000	
