= Gordon B. Frost =

American football coach, athletics administrator (1881–1933)

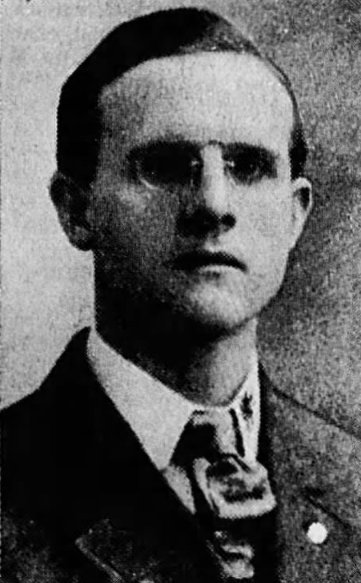
- Frost pictured in Sealth, the Seattle High School yearbook, in 1907.

Biographical details
- Born: October 19, 1881; Hudson Falls, New York, U.S.
- Died: May 29, 1933 (aged 51); Shaker Heights, Ohio, U.S.

Playing career
- 1902: Dartmouth
- Position: Tackle

Coaching career (HC unless noted)
- 1903–1904: Alfred
- 1905–1906: Seattle HS (WA)
- 1907: Oregon

Administrative career (AD unless noted)
- 1908–1933: East Technical HS (OH)

Head coaching record
- Overall: 9–8–1 (college)

Gordon Bennett Frost (October 19, 1881 – May 29, 1933) was an American football coach and athletics administrator. He served as the head football coach at Alfred University in Alfred, New York from 1903 to 1904 and at the University of Oregon for one season, in 1907, compiling a career college football head coaching record of 9–8–1. Frost attended Dartmouth College, where he played football in 1902. He coached scholastic football at Seattle High School in 1905 and 1906, with his 1906 team winning the high school national championship.

Frost was born in Hudson Falls, New York. He earned a Doctor of Laws degree from Ohio Northern University in 1925. Frost was the athletic director at East Technical High School in Cleveland for 25 years. He died of a heart attack, on May 29, 1933, at his home in Shaker Heights, Ohio.

== Head coaching record ==
=== College ===
Year	Team	Overall	Conference	Standing	Bowl/playoffs
Alfred Saxons (Independent) (1903–1904)
1903	Alfred	4–4			
1904	Alfred	0–3–1			
Alfred:		4–7–1			
Oregon Webfoots (Independent) (1907)
1907	Oregon	5–1			
Oregon:		5–1			
Total:		9–8–1			
