= 1907 University of Utah football team =

American college football season

1907 University of Utah football
- Conference: Independent
- Record: 4–2
- Head coach: Joe Maddock (4th season)
- Home stadium: Cummings Field

1907 Western college football independents records
	Conf.			Overall
Team	W	L	T	W		L		T
Oregon Agricultural		–		6	–	0	–	0
New Mexico A&M		–		3	–	0	–	0
New Mexico		–		1	–	0	–	0
Washington State		–		7	–	1	–	0
Colorado Mines		–		5	–	1	–	0
Oregon		–		5	–	1	–	0
USC		–		5	–	1	–	0
Utah Agricultural		–		5	–	1	–	0
Idaho		–		3	–	1	–	2
Montana		–		4	–	1	–	1
Utah		–		4	–	2	–	0
Wyoming		–		2	–	1	–	0
Gonzaga		–		0	–	0	–	1
Washington		–		4	–	4	–	2

The 1907 University of Utah football team was an American football team that represented the University of Utah as an independent during the 1907 college football season. In its fourth season under head coach Joe Maddock, the team compiled a 4–2 record and outscored all opponents by a total of 78 to 59. The team played its home games at Cummings Field in Salt Lake City.

== Schedule ==
Date	Time	Opponent	Site	Result	Source
September 28		Ogden High School†	Cummings Field; Salt Lake City, UT	W 19–0	
October 5		Salt Lake High School†	Cummings Field; Salt Lake City, UT	W 39–0	
October 12	3:15 p.m.	Denver	Cummings Field; Salt Lake City, UT	W 24–4	
October 19		Utah alumni†	Cummings Field; Salt Lake City, UT	W 11–7	
October 26		Colorado Mines	Cummings Field; Salt Lake City, UT	W 16–10	
November 2		St. Vincents (CA)	Fiesta Park; Los Angeles, CA	L 5–11	
November 9		Utah Agricultural	Cummings Field; Salt Lake City, UT (rivalry)	W 10–0	
November 16		at Colorado	Gamble Field; Boulder, CO (rivalry)	L 10–24	
November 28		Colorado College	Cummings Field; Salt Lake City, UT	W 13–10	
