= 1904 Oregon Agricultural Aggies football team =

American college football season

1904 Oregon Agricultural Aggies football
- Coach Steckle as an All-American in 1898
- Conference: Independent
- Record: 4–2
- Head coach: Allen Steckle (1st season)
- Captain: Bert Pilkington
- Home stadium: OAC Field

1904 Far West college football independents records
| | Conf. | | | Overall |
| Team | W | L | T | W | | L | | T |
|---|---|---|---|---|---|---|---|---|
| Utah | | – | | 7 | – | 1 | – | 0 |
| Stanford | | – | | 7 | – | 2 | – | 1 |
| California | | – | | 6 | – | 1 | – | 1 |
| USC | | – | | 6 | – | 1 | – | 0 |
| Idaho | | – | | 2 | – | 1 | – | 0 |
| Montana Agricultural | | – | | 2 | – | 1 | – | 0 |
| Oregon | | – | | 5 | – | 3 | – | 0 |
| Tempe Normal | | – | | 4 | – | 0 | – | 0 |
| Wyoming | | – | | 4 | – | 1 | – | 1 |
| Washington | | – | | 4 | – | 2 | – | 1 |
| Arizona | | – | | 3 | – | 1 | – | 2 |
| Oregon Agricultural | | – | | 4 | – | 2 | – | 0 |
| Montana | | – | | 3 | – | 2 | – | 0 |
| Nevada State | | – | | 3 | – | 3 | – | 0 |
| Washington Agricultural | | – | | 2 | – | 2 | – | 0 |
| Whitman | | – | | 2 | – | 3 | – | 0 |
| New Mexico A&M | | – | | 1 | – | 2 | – | 1 |
| Utah Agricultural | | – | | 4 | – | 8 | – | 0 |
| Cheney Normal | | – | | 1 | – | 6 | – | 0 |

The 1904 Oregon Agricultural Aggies football team represented Oregon Agricultural College (now known as Oregon State University) as an independent during the 1904 college football season. In their first season under head coach Allen Steckle, the Aggies compiled a 4–2 record and outscored their opponents by a combined total of 119 to 22. The Aggies defeated Washington (26–5) and Utah State (45–0), and lost to Oregon (5–6), and the Multnomah Athletic Club (10–11).

For a second consecutive year, fullback Bert Pilkington was elected team captain.

== Schedule ==
| Date | Opponent | Site | Result | Attendance | Source |
|---|---|---|---|---|---|
| October 1 | O.A.C. alumni | OAC Field; Corvallis, OR | W 11–0 | | |
| October 8 | Portland Medical School | OAC Field; Corvallis, OR | W 22–0 | | |
| October 15 | at Washington | Madison Park; Seattle, WA | W 26–5 | | |
| October 26 | Utah Agricultural | OAC Field; Corvallis, OR | W 45–0 | 1,200 | |
| November 5 | Columbia (OR) | OAC Field; Corvallis, OR | Canceled | | |
| November 10 | Whitman | OAC Field; Corvallis, OR | Canceled | | |
| November 19 | Oregon | OAC Field; Corvallis, OR (rivalry) | L 5–6 | | |
| November 24 | Idaho | OAC Field; Corvallis, OR | Canceled | | |
| December 26 | at Multnomah Athletic Club | Multnomah Field; Portland, OR | L 10–11 | | |

== Game summaries ==
=== October 1: OAC alumni ===
The 1904 season marked the first time that the OAC football squad opened the year in an exhibition game against the school's varsity players from yesteryear. The core of this season's alumni team had roots in the 1897 championship team — 9 of the starting 11 — a club which had never lost in five contests played that year. However, the returning veterans had no occasion to practice in previous days, but rather attempted to run through their paces and learn play signals the morning of the game, and rust was evident.

Sprinter Floyd Williams was a star of the 1904 OAC team. Williams captained OAC's state champion track team in the spring.

"The '97 champions still seemed to have a warm spot in the affections of their old-time admirers and this sentiment seemed to spread among those who had never seen the old heroes on the gridiron," a reporter for the campus monthly magazine observed.

The first dramatic moment came when quarterback Rose of the OAC Varsity broke away for an apparent touchdown, which was called back when the offense was ruled off-sides. It was George H. Root of the Varsity, returning a punt 35-yards for a 5-point touchdown, who opened the scoring. The conversion attempt by Pilkington, a kick for the 1-point goal after touchdown failed, and the Varsity nursed its 5–0 lead to halftime, confident in having outplayed the old veterans during the first stanza.

In the second half, the teams traded possessions evenly, with the Varsity ultimately gaining the ball after a short punt and slowly driving the field, with speedy left halfback Floyd Williams doing honors with an 18-yard run around right end. This time Pilkington successfully converted the goal for extra point, for an 11–0 final score.

After the game, a reception and program was held in honor of the 1897 team, at which speeches were delivered by Coach Steckle and other campus worthies thanking them for playing the current team. A vocal solo was sung by student Lulu Spangler to the assemblage, and then a short dance program was presented. The evening was deemed a great success.

=== October 8: Portland Medical School ===
In what probably still stands as the shortest football game in school history, on October 8, 1904, it took the Aggies just 31 minutes to dispatch the Portland Medics at OAC Field in Corvallis. With the contest kicking off promptly at 3 p.m., the Medics received and fumbled the ball on the first play from scrimmage, with the Orangemen making the recovery. A relentless drive ensued, with play after play netting positive yardage for the home team, with team captain and fullback Bert Pilkington making his first touchdown of the year on a 5-yard run. Things went downhill from there.

"The visitors were completely outclassed, being unable to make the required yardage in a single instance, so they fought a defensive game, resorting to a punt on the first formation whenever they secured the ball," an OAC reporter noted.

The Aggies scored four touchdowns on the day, with an apparent fifth score on a 50-yard run by Floyd Williams negated by a holding penalty. Shortly after 3:30, the teams called it a day and went home.

=== October 26: Agricultural College of Utah ===
For the second time in the 1904 season, an opponent of OAC chose to tap out rather than play the scheduled match to its chronological conclusion, when OAC and the Agricultural College of Utah mutually agreed to shorten the second half to just 15 minutes to tamp down what was shaping up as a one-sided shutout.

== Roster ==
Starters of the 1904 OAC Aggies team.

Players in the Alumni game of October 1 included:

- LE: Kenneth Cooper
- LT: Albert B. Bower
- LG: William J. Dunlap
- C: Guy Walker
- RG: Lyman A. Bundy
- RT: William G. Abraham
- RE: Harvey E. Rinehart
- QB: Rose
- LHB: Floyd A. Williams
- RHB: George Herbert Root
- FB: Bert Pilkington

Substitutes: Oberer, Roderick Nash
