= 1906 Washington football team =

American college football season

1906 Washington football
- Conference: Independent
- Record: 4–1–4
- Head coach: Victor M. Place (1st season)
- Captain: Owen Crim
- Home stadium: Denny Field

1906 Western college football independents records
	Conf.			Overall
Team	W	L	T	W		L		T
Washington State		–		6	–	0	–	0
New Mexico A&M		–		4	–	0	–	0
Oregon		–		5	–	0	–	1
Colorado Mines		–		3	–	0	–	2
Utah		–		4	–	1	–	0
New Mexico		–		3	–	1	–	0
USC		–		2	–	0	–	2
Utah Agricultural		–		3	–	1	–	0
Oregon Agricultural		–		4	–	1	–	2
Washington		–		4	–	1	–	4
Cheney Normal		–		5	–	3	–	0
Wyoming		–		1	–	1	–	0
Idaho		–		2	–	4	–	0
Montana		–		2	–	4	–	0
Tempe Normal		–		0	–	2	–	0

The 1906 Washington football team was an American football team that represented the University of Washington as an independent during the 1906 college football season. In its first season under coach Victor M. Place, the team compiled a 4–1–4 record and outscored its opponents by a combined total of 49 to 35. Owen Crim was the team captain.

== Schedule ==
Date	Time	Opponent	Site	Result	Attendance	Source
October 10		USS Philadelphia	Denny Field; Seattle, WA	W 5–0	500	
October 13	3:00 p.m.	at Whitworth	Y. M. C. A. grounds; Tacoma, WA	W 8–0	1,000	
October 20		Seattle High School	Denny Field; Seattle, WA	W 4–0	500	
October 20		Seattle Athletic Club	Denny Field; Seattle, WA	T 10–10	1,000	
October 27	3:00 p.m.	Oregon Agricultural	Denny Field; Seattle, WA	T 0–0	2,400	
November 3		Whitman	Denny Field; Seattle, WA	T 0–0	2,500	
November 10		Whitworth	Denny Field; Seattle, WA	T 0–0	3,000	
November 20		at Oregon	Kincaid Field; Eugene, OR (rivalry)	L 6–16	1,500	
November 29		Idaho	Denny Field; Seattle, WA	W 16–9	3,500	
