= 1906 Washington State football team =

American college football season

1906 Washington State football
- Conference: Independent
- Record: 6–0
- Head coach: John R. Bender (1st season)
- Captain: Harry Goldsworthy
- Home stadium: Rogers Field

1906 Western college football independents records
	Conf.			Overall
Team	W	L	T	W		L		T
Washington State		–		6	–	0	–	0
New Mexico A&M		–		4	–	0	–	0
Oregon		–		5	–	0	–	1
Colorado Mines		–		3	–	0	–	2
Utah		–		4	–	1	–	0
New Mexico		–		3	–	1	–	0
USC		–		2	–	0	–	2
Utah Agricultural		–		3	–	1	–	0
Oregon Agricultural		–		4	–	1	–	2
Washington		–		4	–	1	–	4
Cheney Normal		–		5	–	3	–	0
Wyoming		–		1	–	1	–	0
Idaho		–		2	–	4	–	0
Montana		–		2	–	4	–	0
Tempe Normal		–		0	–	2	–	0

The 1906 Washington State football team was an American football team that represented Washington State College during the 1906 college football season. The team competed as an independent under first-year head coach John R. Bender and compiled a record of 6–0.

== Schedule ==
Date	Opponent	Site	Result	Attendance
October 13	Blair College	Rogers Field; Pullman, WA	W 11–0	
October 19	at Montana	Missoula, MT	W 5–0	
November 3	at Spokane Athletic Club	Spokane, WA	W 4–0	350
November 9	Idaho	Rogers Field; Pullman, WA (rivalry)	W 10–0	
November 17	at Spokane Athletic Club	Spokane, WA	W 8–0	
November 24	Whitman	Rogers Field; Pullman, WA	W 6–0	1,000
