= Martin F. Angell =

American sports coach and professor

Biographical details
- Born: December 29, 1878; Delavan, Wisconsin, U.S.
- Died: September 3, 1930 (aged 53–54); Spokane, Washington, U.S.
- Education: Wisconsin

Coaching career (HC unless noted)

Football
- 1905–1907: New Mexico

Baseball
- 1906: New Mexico

Martin Fuller Angell (December 29, 1878 – September 3, 1930) was an American football and baseball coach and physics and mathematics professor.

Angell was born in Delavan, Wisconsin, in 1878. He attended the University of Wisconsin where he received a bachelor's degree in 1902.

Angell became a professor of physics and mathematics at the University of New Mexico in 1903 and received his master's degree there. In 1905, he also became a professor in electrical engineering and secured the university's first engineering equipment. He became the dean of the engineering college at the University of New Mexico and was referred to as the "father of the engineering college". He received his Ph.D. from the University of Wisconsin in 1911.

While at the University of New Mexico, he also served as the head football and baseball coach.

Angell joined the physics department at the University of Idaho in 1913. In 1921, he became dean of the university's college of letters and sciences. In 1927, he also became dean of the graduate school. He also served for two years as executive dean of the university's southern branch at Pocatello for two years.

Angell died in 1930 in Spokane, Washington, after being diagnosed with undulant or Malta fever.

== Head coaching record ==
Year	Team	Overall	Conference	Standing	Bowl/playoffs
University of New Mexico (Independent) (1905–1907)
1905	University of New Mexico	5–1–1			
1906	University of New Mexico	3–1			
1907	University of New Mexico	1–0			
University of New Mexico:		9–2–1			
Total:		9–2–1			
