= 1907 USC Methodists football team =

American college football season

1907 USC Methodists football
- Conference: Independent
- Record: 5–1
- Head coach: Harvey Holmes (4th season)
- Captain: Charley Haigler

1907 Western college football independents records
	Conf.			Overall
Team	W	L	T	W		L		T
Oregon Agricultural		–		6	–	0	–	0
New Mexico A&M		–		3	–	0	–	0
New Mexico		–		1	–	0	–	0
Washington State		–		7	–	1	–	0
Colorado Mines		–		5	–	1	–	0
Oregon		–		5	–	1	–	0
USC		–		5	–	1	–	0
Utah Agricultural		–		5	–	1	–	0
Idaho		–		3	–	1	–	2
Montana		–		4	–	1	–	1
Utah		–		4	–	2	–	0
Wyoming		–		2	–	1	–	0
Gonzaga		–		0	–	0	–	1
Washington		–		4	–	4	–	2

The 1907 USC Methodists football team was an American football team that represented the University of Southern California during the 1907 college football season. The team competed as an independent under head coach Harvey Holmes, compiling a 5–1 record.

== Schedule ==
Date	Time	Opponent	Site	Result	Attendance	Source
October 12		vs. Los Angeles High School	Fiesta Park; Los Angeles, CA	W 6–0	2,000	
October 16	3:00 p.m.	Whittier State	Bovard Field; Los Angeles, CA	W 57–0		
October 26		at Santa Ana High School	Santa Ana, CA	W 51–0		
November 9	2:30 p.m.	Whittier	Bovard Field; Los Angeles, CA	W 46–0	800	
November 15	3:00 p.m.	USS Colorado	Bovard Field; Los Angeles, CA	W 16–4	1,200	
December 25		vs. Los Angeles High School	Fiesta Park; Los Angeles, CA	L 6–16	2,200	
