= George P. Campbell =

American football and basketball coach, teacher, and administrator

Biographical details
- Born: March 29, 1872; San Francisco, California, U.S.

Coaching career (HC unless noted)

Football
- 1902–1906: Utah Agricultural

Basketball
- 1903–1907: Utah Agricultural

Administrative career (AD unless noted)
- 1902–1907: Utah Agricultural

Head coaching record
- Overall: 12–16–2 (football); 6–15 (basketball)

George Peter Campbell (March 29, 1872 – ?) was an American college football and college basketball coach, teacher, and athletics administrator. He served as the head football coach at the Agricultural College of Utah, now Utah State University, from 1902 to 1906, as athletic director from 1902 to 1907, and as the head basketball coach from 1903 to 1907.

Campbell was born in San Francisco in 1872. Campbell was the brother of Harvard All-American Dave Campbell.

Campbell graduated from Worcester Academy in 1896 and from Harvard in 1900. After graduating from Harvard, he taught at Worcester Academy for two years.

Campbell was hired at Utah Agricultural in May 1902 as an instructor in athletics and as a mathematics teacher. He also became a professor of physics.

After leaving Utah Agricultural, Campbell worked in the west and in Mexico for the United States Smelting and Mining Co. from 1907 to 1910. In 1910, he was appointed as the superintendent of State Industrial School for Boys at Shirley, Massachusetts. Campbell continued as superintendent of the State Industrial School until reaching the mandatory retirement age in 1942.

== Head coaching record ==
=== Football ===
Year	Team	Overall	Conference	Standing	Bowl/playoffs
Utah Agricultural Aggies (Independent) (1902–1906)
1902	Utah Agricultural	0–5–1			
1903	Utah Agricultural	3–0			
1904	Utah Agricultural	4–8			
1905	Utah Agricultural	2–2–1			
1906	Utah Agricultural	3–1			
Utah Agricultural:		12–16–2			
Total:		12–16–2			
