= 1906 Montana football team =

American college football season

1906 Montana football
- Conference: Independent
- Record: 2–4
- Head coach: Frederick Schule (2nd season)

1906 Western college football independents records
	Conf.			Overall
Team	W	L	T	W		L		T
Washington State		–		6	–	0	–	0
New Mexico A&M		–		4	–	0	–	0
Oregon		–		5	–	0	–	1
Colorado Mines		–		3	–	0	–	2
Utah		–		4	–	1	–	0
New Mexico		–		3	–	1	–	0
USC		–		2	–	0	–	2
Utah Agricultural		–		3	–	1	–	0
Oregon Agricultural		–		4	–	1	–	2
Washington		–		4	–	1	–	4
Wyoming		–		1	–	1	–	0
Idaho		–		2	–	4	–	0
Montana		–		2	–	4	–	0
Tempe Normal		–		0	–	2	–	0

The 1906 Montana football team represented the University of Montana in the 1906 college football season. They were led by second-year head coach Frederick Schule, and finished the season with a record of two wins and four losses (2–4).

== Schedule ==
Date	Opponent	Site	Result	Source
October 13	Fort Shaw Indian School	Missoula, MT	W 36–6	
October 19	Washington State	Missoula, MT	L 0–5	
October 27	Spokane Athletic Club	Missoula, MT	W 11–0	
November 3	at Utah	Cummings Field; Salt Lake City, UT	L 0–42	
November 8	at Utah Agricultural	Logan, UT	L 6–17	
November 29	Ex-Collegians	Missoula, MT	L 0–6	
