= 1904 Oregon Webfoots football team =

American college football season

1904 Oregon Webfoots football
- Conference: Independent
- Record: 5–3
- Head coach: Richard Shore Smith (1st season)
- Captain: J. H. Templeton
- Home stadium: Kincaid Field

1904 Far West college football independents records
	Conf.			Overall
Team	W	L	T	W		L		T
Utah		–		7	–	1	–	0
Stanford		–		7	–	2	–	1
California		–		6	–	1	–	1
USC		–		6	–	1	–	0
Idaho		–		2	–	1	–	0
Montana Agricultural		–		2	–	1	–	0
Oregon		–		5	–	3	–	0
Tempe Normal		–		4	–	0	–	0
Wyoming		–		4	–	1	–	1
Washington		–		4	–	2	–	1
Arizona		–		3	–	1	–	2
Oregon Agricultural		–		4	–	2	–	0
Montana		–		3	–	2	–	0
Nevada State		–		3	–	3	–	0
Washington Agricultural		–		2	–	2	–	0
New Mexico A&M		–		1	–	2	–	1
Utah Agricultural		–		4	–	8	–	0

The 1904 Oregon Webfoots football team represented the University of Oregon in the 1904 college football season. It was the Webfoots' 11th season; they competed as an independent and were led by head coach Richard Shore Smith. They finished the season with a record of five wins and three losses (5–3).

== Schedule ==
Date	Time	Opponent	Site	Result	Attendance	Source
October 8		vs. Oregon alumni	Eugene, OR	W 20–0		
October 12		at Albany College (OR)	Rambler Park; Albany, OR	W 4–0		
October 15		Willamette	Kincaid Field; Eugene, OR	W 16–0		
October 22		at California	California Field; Berkeley, CA	L 0–12	4,000	
October 29	3:30 p.m.	at Stanford	Stanford, CA	L 0–35		
November 12	3:00 p.m.	Washington	Kincaid Field; Eugene, OR (rivalry)	W 18–0	1,000–1,500	
November 19		Oregon Agricultural	College Field; Corvallis, OR (rivalry)	W 6–5	1,300	
November 24	2:30 p.m.	at Multnomah Athletic Amateur Club	Multnomah Field; Portland, OR	L 0–7		
All times are in Pacific time; Source:
