= 1907 Utah Agricultural Aggies football team =

American college football season

1907 Utah Agricultural Aggies football
- Conference: Independent
- Record: 5–1
- Head coach: Fred M. Walker (1st season)
- Home stadium: U.A.C. gridiron

1907 Western college football independents records
	Conf.			Overall
Team	W	L	T	W		L		T
Oregon Agricultural		–		6	–	0	–	0
New Mexico A&M		–		3	–	0	–	0
New Mexico		–		1	–	0	–	0
Washington State		–		7	–	1	–	0
Colorado Mines		–		5	–	1	–	0
Oregon		–		5	–	1	–	0
USC		–		5	–	1	–	0
Utah Agricultural		–		5	–	1	–	0
Idaho		–		3	–	1	–	2
Montana		–		4	–	1	–	1
Utah		–		4	–	2	–	0
Wyoming		–		2	–	1	–	0
Gonzaga		–		0	–	0	–	1
Washington		–		4	–	4	–	2

The 1907 Utah Agricultural Aggies football team was an American football team that represented Utah Agricultural College (later renamed Utah State University) as an independent during the 1907 college football season. In their first season under head coach Fred M. Walker, the Aggies compiled a 5–1 record and outscored opponents by a total of 156 to 25.

On November 25, the Aggies played the "Crimsons", a team formed by Brigham Young College students and led by coach Art Badenoch. The Aggies won the game, 100–0. The 100-point victory over the Crimsons remains the second largest margin in Utah State football history.

Walker later became a pitcher in Major League Baseball.

== Schedule ==
Date	Opponent	Site	Result	Source
October 5	Ogden High School	U.A.C. gridiron; Logan, UT	W 6–0	
October 12	Salt Lake High School	U.A.C. gridiron; Logan, UT	W 21–4	
October 18	All Hallows College	U.A.C. gridiron; Logan, UT	W 45–6	
October 26	All-Stars (Utah coaches)	U.A.C. gridiron; Logan, UT	W 11–5	
November 9	at Utah	Cummings Field; Salt Lake City, UT (rivalry)	L 0–10	
November 25	Crimsons	U.A.C. gridiron; Logan, UT	W 100–0	
