= 1907 Colorado Mines Orediggers football team =

American college football season

1907 Colorado Mines Orediggers football
- Conference: Independent
- Record: 5–1
- Head coach: Shorty Ellsworth (4th season)

1907 Western college football independents records
	Conf.			Overall
Team	W	L	T	W		L		T
Oregon Agricultural		–		6	–	0	–	0
New Mexico A&M		–		3	–	0	–	0
New Mexico		–		1	–	0	–	0
Washington State		–		7	–	1	–	0
Colorado Mines		–		5	–	1	–	0
Oregon		–		5	–	1	–	0
USC		–		5	–	1	–	0
Utah Agricultural		–		5	–	1	–	0
Idaho		–		3	–	1	–	2
Montana		–		4	–	1	–	1
Utah		–		4	–	2	–	0
Wyoming		–		2	–	1	–	0
Gonzaga		–		0	–	0	–	1
Washington		–		4	–	4	–	2

The 1907 Colorado Mines Orediggers football team was an American football team that represented the Colorado School of Mines as an independent during the 1907 college football season. The team compiled a 5–1 record, shut out four of its six opponents, and outscored all opponents by a total of 175 to 20.

== Schedule ==
Date	Opponent	Site	Result	Attendance	Source
October 19	Wyoming	Golden, CO	W 77–0		
October 26	at Utah	Cummings Field; Salt Lake City, UT	L 10–16		
November 2	at Colorado Agricultural	Durkee Field; Fort Collins, CO	W 35–0		
November 9	Denver	Golden, CO	W 33–0		
November 16	vs. Colorado College	Denver, CO	W 15–0	10,000	
November 21	vs. Colorado	Denver, CO	W 5–4		
