= 1906 New Mexico A&M Aggies football team =

American college football season

1906 New Mexico A&M Aggies football
- Conference: Independent
- Record: 4–0
- Head coach: John O. Miller (7th season)
- Home stadium: College Field

1906 Western college football independents records
	Conf.			Overall
Team	W	L	T	W		L		T
Washington State		–		6	–	0	–	0
New Mexico A&M		–		4	–	0	–	0
Oregon		–		5	–	0	–	1
Colorado Mines		–		3	–	0	–	2
Utah		–		4	–	1	–	0
New Mexico		–		3	–	1	–	0
USC		–		2	–	0	–	2
Utah Agricultural		–		3	–	1	–	0
Oregon Agricultural		–		4	–	1	–	2
Washington		–		4	–	1	–	4
Wyoming		–		1	–	1	–	0
Idaho		–		2	–	4	–	0
Montana		–		2	–	4	–	0
Tempe Normal		–		0	–	2	–	0

The 1906 New Mexico A&M Aggies football team was an American football team that represented New Mexico College of Agriculture and Mechanical Arts (now known as New Mexico State University) during the 1906 college football season. In their seventh year under head coach John O. Miller, the Aggies compiled a 4–0 record and outscored opponents by a total of 71 to 12. The team played its home games on College Field, later renamed Miller Field in honor of coach Miller.

== Schedule ==
Date	Opponent	Site	Result	Source
October 20	El Paso Athletics	Mesilla Park, New Mexico Territory	W 5–0	
November 10	New Mexico Mines	Mesilla Park, New Mexico Territory	W 19–5	
November 17	at New Mexico Mines	Socorro, New Mexico Territory	W 22–2	
November 29	at New Mexico	Traction Park; Albuquerque, New Mexico Territory (rivalry)	W 25–5	
