= 1906 University of Utah football team =

American college football season

1906 University of Utah football
- Conference: Independent
- Record: 6–1
- Head coach: Joe Maddock (3rd season)
- Captain: Fred Bennion
- Home stadium: Cummings Field

1906 Western college football independents records
	Conf.			Overall
Team	W	L	T	W		L		T
Washington State		–		6	–	0	–	0
New Mexico A&M		–		4	–	0	–	0
Oregon		–		5	–	0	–	1
Colorado Mines		–		3	–	0	–	2
Utah		–		4	–	1	–	0
New Mexico		–		3	–	1	–	0
USC		–		2	–	0	–	2
Utah Agricultural		–		3	–	1	–	0
Oregon Agricultural		–		4	–	1	–	2
Washington		–		4	–	1	–	4
Wyoming		–		1	–	1	–	0
Idaho		–		2	–	4	–	0
Montana		–		2	–	4	–	0
Tempe Normal		–		0	–	2	–	0

The 1906 University of Utah football team was an American football team that represented the University of Utah as an independent during the 1906 college football season. In its third season under head coach Joe Maddock, the team compiled a 6–1 record, shut out six of seven opponents, and outscored all opponents by a total of 170 to 6. Fred Bennion, who later served as the team's head coach, was the team captain.

== Schedule ==
Date	Opponent	Site	Result	Source
October 13	at Colorado College	Washburn Field; Colorado Springs, CO	L 0–6	
October 20	at Denver	Denver, CO	W 24–0	
November 3	Montana	Cummings Field; Salt Lake City, UT	W 42–0	
November 9	at All Hallows College†	Salt Lake City, UT	W 23–0 (practice)	
November 17	Colorado	Cummings Field; Salt Lake City, UT (rivalry)	W 10–0	
November 24	at Fort Douglas†	Fort Douglas, UT	W 36–0 (practice)	
November 29	Utah Agricultural	Cummings Field; Salt Lake City, UT (rivalry)	W 35–0	
