= 1904 Washington football team =

American college football season

1904 Washington football
- Conference: Independent
- Record: 4–2–1
- Head coach: James Knight (3rd season)
- Captain: Fred McElmon
- Home stadium: Madison Park, Recreation Park

1904 Far West college football independents records
| | Conf. | | | Overall |
| Team | W | L | T | W | | L | | T |
|---|---|---|---|---|---|---|---|---|
| Utah | | – | | 7 | – | 1 | – | 0 |
| Stanford | | – | | 7 | – | 2 | – | 1 |
| California | | – | | 6 | – | 1 | – | 1 |
| USC | | – | | 6 | – | 1 | – | 0 |
| Idaho | | – | | 2 | – | 1 | – | 0 |
| Montana Agricultural | | – | | 2 | – | 1 | – | 0 |
| Oregon | | – | | 5 | – | 3 | – | 0 |
| Tempe Normal | | – | | 4 | – | 0 | – | 0 |
| Wyoming | | – | | 4 | – | 1 | – | 1 |
| Washington | | – | | 4 | – | 2 | – | 1 |
| Arizona | | – | | 3 | – | 1 | – | 2 |
| Oregon Agricultural | | – | | 4 | – | 2 | – | 0 |
| Montana | | – | | 3 | – | 2 | – | 0 |
| Nevada State | | – | | 3 | – | 3 | – | 0 |
| Washington Agricultural | | – | | 2 | – | 2 | – | 0 |
| New Mexico A&M | | – | | 1 | – | 2 | – | 1 |
| Utah Agricultural | | – | | 4 | – | 8 | – | 0 |
| Cheney Normal | | – | | 1 | – | 6 | – | 0 |

The 1904 Washington football team was an American football team that represented the University of Washington as an independent during the 1904 college football season. In its third and final season under coach James Knight, the team compiled a 4–2–1 record and outscored its opponents by a combined total of 113 to 66. After serving as captain in 1902, Fred McElmon led the squad once more.

Washington played a seven-game schedule against regional opponents. The team the season with a 33–0 home win over Whitman at Madison Park, and then lost 26–5 to Oregon Agricultural. Washington rebounded with consecutive victories over Utah Agricultural (45–0), Washington Agricultural (12–6) and Idaho (12–10) before closing the schedule with an 18–0 road loss at Oregon and a 6–6 home tie with California at Recreation Park in Seattle.

== Schedule ==
| Date | Time | Opponent | Site | Result | Attendance | Source |
|---|---|---|---|---|---|---|
| October 8 | | Whitman | Madison Park; Seattle, WA | W 33–0 | | |
| October 15 | | Oregon Agricultural | Madison Park; Seattle, WA | L 5–26 | 1,000 | |
| October 22 | 3:00 p.m. | Utah Agricultural | Madison Park; Seattle, WA | W 45–0 | | |
| October 29 | 2:30 p.m. | Washington Agricultural | Madison Park; Seattle, WA (rivalry) | W 12–6 | 1,000 | |
| November 5 | | Idaho | Madison Park; Seattle, WA | W 12–10 | | |
| November 12 | 3:00 p.m. | at Oregon | Kincaid Field; Eugene, OR (rivalry) | L 0–18 | 1,000–1,500 | |
| November 24 | 1:00 p.m. | California | Recreation Park; Seattle, WA | T 6–6 | 3,000 | |
