= Ferris, Illinois =

- Village
- Location of Ferris in Hancock County, Illinois.
- Coordinates: 40°28′10″N 91°10′06″W
- Country: United States
- State: Illinois
- County: Hancock

Area
  - Total: 1.97 sq mi (5.09 km^{2})
  - Land: 1.97 sq mi (5.09 km^{2})
  - Water: 0 sq mi (0.00 km^{2})
- Elevation: 682 ft (208 m)

Population (2020)
  - Total: 127
  - Density: 64.6/sq mi (24.93/km^{2})
- Time zone: UTC-6 (CST)
  - Summer (DST): UTC-5 (CDT)
- ZIP code: 62336
- Area code: 217
- FIPS code: 17-25895
- GNIS feature ID: 2398872

Ferris is a village in Hancock County, Illinois, United States. The population was 127 at the 2020 census.

== Geography ==
Ferris is located in north-central Hancock County 5 miles (8 km) north of Carthage, the county seat.

According to the 2021 census gazetteer files, Ferris has a total area of 1.97 square miles (5.10 km^{2}), all land. With a population of 120

== Demographics ==
Historical population
Census	Pop.	Note	%±
1880	182		—
1890	305		67.6%
1900	269		−11.8%
1910	299		11.2%
1920	297		−0.7%
1930	250		−15.8%
1940	272		8.8%
1950	226		−16.9%
1960	208		−8.0%
1970	200		−3.8%
1980	202		1.0%
1990	177		−12.4%
2000	168		−5.1%
2010	156		−7.1%
2020	127		−18.6%
U.S. Decennial Census

As of the 2020 census there were 127 people, 57 households, and 50 families residing in the village. The population density was 64.57 inhabitants per square mile (24.93/km^{2}). There were 67 housing units at an average density of 34.06 per square mile (13.15/km^{2}). The racial makeup of the village was 88.19% White, 0.79% African American, 1.57% Native American, 0.00% Asian, 0.00% Pacific Islander, 0.00% from other races, and 9.45% from two or more races. Hispanic or Latino of any race were 0.79% of the population.

There were 57 households, out of which 21.1% had children under the age of 18 living with them, 73.68% were married couples living together, 1.75% had a female householder with no husband present, and 12.28% were non-families. 12.28% of all households were made up of individuals, and 10.53% had someone living alone who was 65 years of age or older. The average household size was 3.08 and the average family size was 2.88.

The village's age distribution consisted of 18.3% under the age of 18, 1.2% from 18 to 24, 20.7% from 25 to 44, 26.2% from 45 to 64, and 33.5% who were 65 years of age or older. The median age was 56.5 years. For every 100 females, there were 144.8 males. For every 100 females age 18 and over, there were 127.1 males.

The median income for a household in the village was $43,750, and the median income for a family was $45,833. Males had a median income of $40,625 versus $27,000 for females. The per capita income for the village was $23,674. About 12.0% of families and 17.7% of the population were below the poverty line, including 46.7% of those under age 18 and 18.2% of those age 65 or over.

== Education ==
Residents are in Carthage Elementary School District 317 and Illini West High School District 307.
