= 1906 Colorado Mines Orediggers football team =

American college football season

1906 Colorado Mines Orediggers football
- Conference: Independent
- Record: 3–0–2
- Head coach: Shorty Ellsworth (3rd season)

1906 Western college football independents records
	Conf.			Overall
Team	W	L	T	W		L		T
Washington State		–		6	–	0	–	0
New Mexico A&M		–		4	–	0	–	0
Oregon		–		5	–	0	–	1
Colorado Mines		–		3	–	0	–	2
Utah		–		4	–	1	–	0
New Mexico		–		3	–	1	–	0
USC		–		2	–	0	–	2
Utah Agricultural		–		3	–	1	–	0
Oregon Agricultural		–		4	–	1	–	2
Washington		–		4	–	1	–	4
Wyoming		–		1	–	1	–	0
Idaho		–		2	–	4	–	0
Montana		–		2	–	4	–	0
Tempe Normal		–		0	–	2	–	0

The 1906 Colorado Mines Orediggers football team was an American football team that represented the Colorado School of Mines as an independent during the 1906 college football season. The team compiled a 3–0–2 record, shut out four of its five opponents, and outscored all opponents by a total of 61 to 4.

== Schedule ==
Date	Opponent	Site	Result	Attendance	Source
October 15	at Wyoming	Laramie, WY	W 35–0		
October 20	Colorado Agricultural	Athletic Park; Golden, CO	W 11–0		
November 3	at Denver	Denver, CO	W 11–0		
November 17	vs. Colorado College	Denver, CO	T 4–4		
November 22	at Colorado	Gamble Field; Boulder, CO	T 0–0		
