= 1904 Nevada State Sagebrushers football team =

American college football season

1904 Nevada State Sagebrushers football
- Conference: Independent
- Record: 3–3
- Head coach: Bruce Shorts (1st season)
- Home stadium: Evans Field

1904 Far West college football independents records
	Conf.			Overall
Team	W	L	T	W		L		T
Utah		–		7	–	1	–	0
Stanford		–		7	–	2	–	1
California		–		6	–	1	–	1
USC		–		6	–	1	–	0
Idaho		–		2	–	1	–	0
Montana Agricultural		–		2	–	1	–	0
Oregon		–		5	–	3	–	0
Tempe Normal		–		4	–	0	–	0
Wyoming		–		4	–	1	–	1
Washington		–		4	–	2	–	1
Arizona		–		3	–	1	–	2
Oregon Agricultural		–		4	–	2	–	0
Montana		–		3	–	2	–	0
Nevada State		–		3	–	3	–	0
Washington Agricultural		–		2	–	2	–	0
New Mexico A&M		–		1	–	2	–	1
Utah Agricultural		–		4	–	8	–	0

The 1904 Nevada State Sagebrushers football team was an American football team that represented Nevada State University (now known as the University of Nevada, Reno) as an independent during the 1904 college football season. In its first and only season under head coach Bruce Shorts, the team compiled a 3–3 record.

== Schedule ==
Date	Opponent	Site	Result	Source
October 8	Fort Baker, Coast Artillery	Evans Field; Reno, NV	W 18–0	
October 15	Olympic Club	Evans Field; Reno, NV	W 8–5	
October 22	at Stanford	Palo Alto, CA	L 0–17	
November 5	at California	California Field; Berkeley, CA	L 0–16	
November 9	Utah Agricultural	Evans Field; Reno, NV	W 24–5	
December 25	Sherman Indian School (CA)	Los Angeles, CA	L 5–26	
