= 1907 Oregon Webfoots football team =

American college football season

1907 Oregon Webfoots football
- Conference: Independent
- Record: 5–1
- Head coach: Gordon B. Frost (1st season)
- Captain: Gordon Moores
- Home stadium: Kincaid Field

1907 Western college football independents records
	Conf.			Overall
Team	W	L	T	W		L		T
Oregon Agricultural		–		6	–	0	–	0
New Mexico A&M		–		3	–	0	–	0
New Mexico		–		1	–	0	–	0
Washington State		–		7	–	1	–	0
Colorado Mines		–		5	–	1	–	0
Oregon		–		5	–	1	–	0
USC		–		5	–	1	–	0
Utah Agricultural		–		5	–	1	–	0
Idaho		–		3	–	1	–	2
Montana		–		4	–	1	–	1
Utah		–		4	–	2	–	0
Wyoming		–		2	–	1	–	0
Gonzaga		–		0	–	0	–	1
Washington		–		4	–	4	–	2

The 1907 Oregon Webfoots football team represented the University of Oregon in the 1907 college football season. It was the Webfoots' 14th season; they competed as an independent and were led by head coach Gordon B. Frost. They finished the season with a record of five wins and one loss (5–1).

== Schedule ==
Date	Opponent	Site	Result	Attendance	Source
October 19	Pacific (OR)	Kincaid Field; Eugene, OR	W 52–0		
October 26	vs. Idaho	Portland, OR	W 21–5		
November 2	at Willamette	Salem, OR	W 11–0		
November 9	Oregon Agricultural College	Kincaid Field; Eugene, OR (rivalry)	L 0–4		
November 16	at Washington	Denny Field; Seattle, WA (rivalry)	W 6–0	2,500	
November 28	vs. Multnomah Athletic Club	Portland, OR	W 10–5		
