= 1906 Utah Agricultural Aggies football team =

American college football season

1906 Utah Agricultural Aggies football
- Conference: Independent
- Record: 3–1
- Head coach: George P. Campbell (5th season)
- Home stadium: U.A.C. athletic field

1906 Western college football independents records
	Conf.			Overall
Team	W	L	T	W		L		T
Washington State		–		6	–	0	–	0
New Mexico A&M		–		4	–	0	–	0
Oregon		–		5	–	0	–	1
Colorado Mines		–		3	–	0	–	2
Utah		–		4	–	1	–	0
New Mexico		–		3	–	1	–	0
USC		–		2	–	0	–	2
Utah Agricultural		–		3	–	1	–	0
Oregon Agricultural		–		4	–	1	–	2
Washington		–		4	–	1	–	4
Wyoming		–		1	–	1	–	0
Idaho		–		2	–	4	–	0
Montana		–		2	–	4	–	0
Tempe Normal		–		0	–	2	–	0

The 1906 Utah Agricultural Aggies football team was an American football team that represented Utah Agricultural College (later renamed Utah State University) during the 1906 college football season. In their fifth and final season under head coach George P. Campbell, the Aggies compiled a 3–1 record but were outscored by a total of 51 to 38.

== Schedule ==
Date	Opponent	Site	Result	Attendance	Source
October 20	Fort Douglas	Logan, UT	W 16–10		
November 3	Ogden High School	Logan, UT	W 5–0		
November 8	Montana	Logan, UT	W 17–6		
November 29	at Utah	Cummings Field; Salt Lake City, UT (rivalry)	L 0–35		
