= 1906 University of New Mexico football team =

American college football season

1906 University of New Mexico football
- Conference: Independent
- Record: 3–1
- Head coach: Martin F. Angell (2nd season)

1906 Western college football independents records
	Conf.			Overall
Team	W	L	T	W		L		T
Washington State		–		6	–	0	–	0
New Mexico A&M		–		4	–	0	–	0
Oregon		–		5	–	0	–	1
Colorado Mines		–		3	–	0	–	2
Utah		–		4	–	1	–	0
New Mexico		–		3	–	1	–	0
USC		–		2	–	0	–	2
Utah Agricultural		–		3	–	1	–	0
Oregon Agricultural		–		4	–	1	–	2
Washington		–		4	–	1	–	4
Wyoming		–		1	–	1	–	0
Idaho		–		2	–	4	–	0
Montana		–		2	–	4	–	0
Tempe Normal		–		0	–	2	–	0

The 1906 University of New Mexico football team was an American football team represented the University of New Mexico as an independent during the 1906 college football season. In its second season under head coach Martin F. Angell, the team compiled a 3–1 record and outscored opponents by a total of 59 to 30. Bernard H. Crawford was the team captain.

== Schedule ==
Date	Opponent	Site	Result	Source
October 13	Albuquerque Indian School	Albuquerque, New Mexico Territory	W 27–5	
October 27	New Mexico Mines	Albuquerque, New Mexico Territory	W 5–0	
November 17	Santa Fe Indian School	Albuquerque, New Mexico Territory	W 22–0	
November 29	New Mexico A&M	Traction Park; Albuquerque, New Mexico Territory (rivalry)	L 5–25	
