= 1906 Wyoming Cowboys football team =

American college football season

1906 Wyoming Cowboys football
- Conference: Independent
- Record: 1–1
- Head coach: William McMurray (7th season)
- Captain: None

1906 Western college football independents records
	Conf.			Overall
Team	W	L	T	W		L		T
Washington State		–		6	–	0	–	0
New Mexico A&M		–		4	–	0	–	0
Oregon		–		5	–	0	–	1
Colorado Mines		–		3	–	0	–	2
Utah		–		4	–	1	–	0
New Mexico		–		3	–	1	–	0
USC		–		2	–	0	–	2
Utah Agricultural		–		3	–	1	–	0
Oregon Agricultural		–		4	–	1	–	2
Washington		–		4	–	1	–	4
Wyoming		–		1	–	1	–	0
Idaho		–		2	–	4	–	0
Montana		–		2	–	4	–	0
Tempe Normal		–		0	–	2	–	0

The 1906 Wyoming Cowboys football team represented the University of Wyoming as an independent during the 1906 college football season. In its seventh season under head coach William McMurray, the team compiled a 1–1 record and was outscored by a total of 35 to 12.

== Schedule ==
Date	Opponent	Site	Result	Source
October 15	Colorado Mines	Laramie, WY	L 0–35	
October 29	Laramie High School	Laramie, WY	W 12–0	
