= 1907 Gonzaga Blue and White football team =

American college football season

1907 Gonzaga Blue and White football
- Conference: Independent
- Record: 0–0–1

1907 Western college football independents records
	Conf.			Overall
Team	W	L	T	W		L		T
Oregon Agricultural		–		6	–	0	–	0
New Mexico A&M		–		3	–	0	–	0
New Mexico		–		1	–	0	–	0
Washington State		–		7	–	1	–	0
Colorado Mines		–		5	–	1	–	0
Oregon		–		5	–	1	–	0
USC		–		5	–	1	–	0
Utah Agricultural		–		5	–	1	–	0
Idaho		–		3	–	1	–	2
Montana		–		4	–	1	–	1
Utah		–		4	–	2	–	0
Wyoming		–		2	–	1	–	0
Gonzaga		–		0	–	0	–	1
Washington		–		4	–	4	–	2

The 1907 Gonzaga Blue and White football team was an American football team that represented Gonzaga College—now known as Gonzaga University–as an independent during the 1907 college football season. Gonzaga compiled a 0–0–1 record.

== Schedule ==
Date	Opponent	Site	Result	Source
October 22	vs. Blair Business College	Natatorium Park; Spokane, WA	T 0–0	
