= 1904 Washington Agricultural football team =

American college football season

1904 Washington Agricultural football
- Conference: Independent
- Record: 2–2
- Head coach: Everett Sweeley (1st season)
- Captain: Clyde Gill
- Home stadium: Rogers Field

1904 Far West college football independents records
	Conf.			Overall
Team	W	L	T	W		L		T
Utah		–		7	–	1	–	0
Stanford		–		7	–	2	–	1
California		–		6	–	1	–	1
USC		–		6	–	1	–	0
Idaho		–		2	–	1	–	0
Montana Agricultural		–		2	–	1	–	0
Oregon		–		5	–	3	–	0
Tempe Normal		–		4	–	0	–	0
Wyoming		–		4	–	1	–	1
Washington		–		4	–	2	–	1
Arizona		–		3	–	1	–	2
Oregon Agricultural		–		4	–	2	–	0
Montana		–		3	–	2	–	0
Nevada State		–		3	–	3	–	0
Washington Agricultural		–		2	–	2	–	0
New Mexico A&M		–		1	–	2	–	1
Utah Agricultural		–		4	–	8	–	0
Cheney Normal		–		1	–	6	–	0

The 1904 Washington Agricultural football team was an American football team that represented Washington Agricultural College as an independent during the 1904 college football season. Led by head coach Everett Sweeley, the team compiled a record of 2–2.

In early 1904, Paul Rader was appointed as football coach at Washington Agricultural College. However, by the summer of 1904, the school's administrators could not locate Rader, who was working as a pastor at a church in Boston, and began negotiations with James N. Ashmore, who had coached the 1903 Washington Agricultural football team, to return in 1904. Sweeley was ultimately hired to coach the team.

== Schedule ==
Date	Opponent	Site	Result	Attendance	Source
October 21	Idaho	Pullman, WA (rivalry)	L 0–5	1,500	
October 29	at Washington	Denny Field; Seattle, WA (rivalry)	L 6–12	1,000	
November 16	at Montana	Missoula, MT	W 6–5		
November 24	at Whitman	Walla Walla, WA	W 34–4	1,000	
