= 1906 Tempe Normal Owls football team =

American college football season

1906 Tempe Normal Owls football
- Conference: Independent
- Record: 0–2
- Head coach: Frederick M. Irish (8th season)
- Home stadium: Normal Field

1906 Western college football independents records
	Conf.			Overall
Team	W	L	T	W		L		T
Washington State		–		6	–	0	–	0
New Mexico A&M		–		4	–	0	–	0
Oregon		–		5	–	0	–	1
Colorado Mines		–		3	–	0	–	2
Utah		–		4	–	1	–	0
New Mexico		–		3	–	1	–	0
USC		–		2	–	0	–	2
Utah Agricultural		–		3	–	1	–	0
Oregon Agricultural		–		4	–	1	–	2
Washington		–		4	–	1	–	4
Wyoming		–		1	–	1	–	0
Idaho		–		2	–	4	–	0
Montana		–		2	–	4	–	0
Tempe Normal		–		0	–	2	–	0

The 1906 Tempe Normal Owls football team was an American football team that represented Tempe Normal School (later renamed Arizona State University) as an independent during the 1906 college football season. In their eighth and final season under head coach Frederick M. Irish, the Owls compiled a 0–2 record and were outscored by their opponents by a combined total of 22 to 6.

== Schedule ==
Opponent	Site	Result
Phoenix Indian School	Normal Field; Tempe, Arizona Territory	L 6–17
Tempe High School	Normal Field; Tempe, Arizona Territory	L 0–5
