= 1907 Montana football team =

American college football season

1907 Montana football
- Conference: Independent
- Record: 4–1–1
- Head coach: Albion Findlay (1st season)

1907 Western college football independents records
	Conf.			Overall
Team	W	L	T	W		L		T
Oregon Agricultural		–		6	–	0	–	0
New Mexico A&M		–		3	–	0	–	0
New Mexico		–		1	–	0	–	0
Washington State		–		7	–	1	–	0
Colorado Mines		–		5	–	1	–	0
Oregon		–		5	–	1	–	0
USC		–		5	–	1	–	0
Utah Agricultural		–		5	–	1	–	0
Idaho		–		3	–	1	–	2
Montana		–		4	–	1	–	1
Utah		–		4	–	2	–	0
Wyoming		–		2	–	1	–	0
Gonzaga		–		0	–	0	–	1
Washington		–		4	–	4	–	2

The 1907 Montana football team represented the University of Montana in the 1907 college football season. They were led by first-year head coach Albion Findlay, and finished the season with a record of four wins, one loss and one tie (4–1–1).

== Schedule ==
Date	Opponent	Site	Result	Source
September 28	Montana Wesleyan	Missoula, MT	W 62–0	
October 13	Fort Shaw Indian School	Missoula, MT	W 28–0	
October 18	at Washington State	Rogers Field; Pullman, WA	L 0–38	
October 25	Montana Mines	Missoula, MT	W 12–0	
November 2	Spokane Athletic Club	Missoula, MT	W 12–0	
November 8	at Montana Mines	Columbia Gardens; Butte, MT	T 0–0	
