= 1904 Stanford football team =

American college football season

1904 Stanford football
- Conference: Independent
- Record: 7–2–1
- Head coach: James F. Lanagan (2nd season)

1904 Far West college football independents records
	Conf.			Overall
Team	W	L	T	W		L		T
Utah		–		7	–	1	–	0
Stanford		–		7	–	2	–	1
California		–		6	–	1	–	1
USC		–		6	–	1	–	0
Idaho		–		2	–	1	–	0
Montana Agricultural		–		2	–	1	–	0
Oregon		–		5	–	3	–	0
Tempe Normal		–		4	–	0	–	0
Wyoming		–		4	–	1	–	1
Washington		–		4	–	2	–	1
Arizona		–		3	–	1	–	2
Oregon Agricultural		–		4	–	2	–	0
Montana		–		3	–	2	–	0
Nevada State		–		3	–	3	–	0
Washington Agricultural		–		2	–	2	–	0
New Mexico A&M		–		1	–	2	–	1
Utah Agricultural		–		4	–	8	–	0

The 1904 Stanford football team represented Stanford University in the 1904 college football season. James F. Lanagan was in his second year as head coach of the team, which played its home games at Stanford Field in Stanford, California.

Stanford allowed only 10 points all season—in two 5–0 losses—and did not allow a point in seven victories and one scoreless tie. The five consecutive wins at the end of the season, combined with eight consecutive wins in the 1905 season, stood as Stanford's longest winning streak for more than 100 years; it was tied by the 1939–1940–1941 teams, and broken by the 2010–2011 teams.

The game against California was the first Big Game to be played at the home field of one of the teams rather than at a neutral site in San Francisco. Stanford defeated California 18–0 at California Field.

== Schedule ==
Date	Time	Opponent	Site	Result	Attendance	Source
September 19		Olympic Club	Stanford, CA	L 0–5		
September 26		USS Pensacola	Stanford, CA	W 34–0		
October 1		Olympic Club	Stanford, CA	W 12–0		
October 8		Sherman Institute	Stanford, CA	L 0–5		
October 12		Multnomah Athletic Club	Stanford, CA	T 0–0		
October 20		Nevada State	Stanford, CA	W 17–0		
October 29	3:30 p.m.	Oregon	Stanford, CA	W 35–0		
November 5		Utah Agricultural	Stanford, CA	W 57–0	1,800	
November 12		at California	California Field; Berkeley, CA (Big Game)	W 18–0		
November 24		vs. Colorado	Broadway Park; Denver, CO	W 33–0		
All times are in Pacific time
