= 1907 New Mexico A&M Aggies football team =

American college football season

1907 New Mexico A&M Aggies football
- Conference: Independent
- Record: 3–0
- Head coach: John O. Miller (8th season)
- Home stadium: College Field

1907 Western college football independents records
	Conf.			Overall
Team	W	L	T	W		L		T
Oregon Agricultural		–		6	–	0	–	0
New Mexico A&M		–		3	–	0	–	0
New Mexico		–		1	–	0	–	0
Washington State		–		7	–	1	–	0
Colorado Mines		–		5	–	1	–	0
Oregon		–		5	–	1	–	0
USC		–		5	–	1	–	0
Utah Agricultural		–		5	–	1	–	0
Idaho		–		3	–	1	–	2
Montana		–		4	–	1	–	1
Utah		–		4	–	2	–	0
Wyoming		–		2	–	1	–	0
Gonzaga		–		0	–	0	–	1
Washington		–		4	–	4	–	2

The 1907 New Mexico A&M Aggies football team was an American football team that represented New Mexico College of Agriculture and Mechanical Arts (now known as New Mexico State University) during the 1907 college football season. In their eighth year under head coach John O. Miller, the Aggies compiled a 3–0 record and outscored opponents by a total of 88 to 6. The team played its home games on College Field, later renamed Miller Field in honor of coach Miller.

The team was undefeated for the third consecutive year. During the 1905, 1906, and 1907 seasons, the Aggies compiled a 10–0 record under coach Miller.

== Schedule ==
Date	Opponent	Site	Result	Source
	El Paso Athletics		W 31–6	
November 16	at El Paso Athletics	Washington Park; El Paso, TX	W 29–0	
November 28	vs. New Mexico Military	Washington Park; El Paso, TX	W 28–0	
