= 1907 University of New Mexico football team =

American college football season

1907 University of New Mexico football
- Conference: Independent
- Record: 1–0
- Head coach: Martin F. Angell (3rd season)

1907 Western college football independents records
	Conf.			Overall
Team	W	L	T	W		L		T
Oregon Agricultural		–		6	–	0	–	0
New Mexico A&M		–		3	–	0	–	0
New Mexico		–		1	–	0	–	0
Washington State		–		7	–	1	–	0
Colorado Mines		–		5	–	1	–	0
Oregon		–		5	–	1	–	0
USC		–		5	–	1	–	0
Utah Agricultural		–		5	–	1	–	0
Idaho		–		3	–	1	–	2
Montana		–		4	–	1	–	1
Utah		–		4	–	2	–	0
Wyoming		–		2	–	1	–	0
Gonzaga		–		0	–	0	–	1
Washington		–		4	–	4	–	2

The 1907 University of New Mexico football team was an American football team represented the University of New Mexico as an independent during the 1907 college football season. In its third and final season under head coach Martin F. Angell, the team compiled a 1–0 record, defeating the Albuquerque Indian School by a score of 44 to 0. Walter R. Allen was the team captain.

The season ended early in order to allow the team to devote more time to its studies.

== Schedule ==
Date	Opponent	Site	Result	Source
October 26	Albuquerque Indian School	Albuquerque, New Mexico Territory	W 44–0	
