= 1907 Wyoming Cowboys football team =

American college football season

1907 Wyoming Cowboys football
- Conference: Independent
- Record: 2–1
- Head coach: Robert Ehlman (1st season)
- Captain: M. E. Corthell

1907 Western college football independents records
	Conf.			Overall
Team	W	L	T	W		L		T
Oregon Agricultural		–		6	–	0	–	0
New Mexico A&M		–		3	–	0	–	0
New Mexico		–		1	–	0	–	0
Washington State		–		7	–	1	–	0
Colorado Mines		–		5	–	1	–	0
Oregon		–		5	–	1	–	0
USC		–		5	–	1	–	0
Utah Agricultural		–		5	–	1	–	0
Idaho		–		3	–	1	–	2
Montana		–		4	–	1	–	1
Utah		–		4	–	2	–	0
Wyoming		–		2	–	1	–	0
Gonzaga		–		0	–	0	–	1
Washington		–		4	–	4	–	2

The 1907 Wyoming Cowboys football team represented the University of Wyoming as an independent during the 1907 college football season. In their first season under head coach Robert Ehlman, the team compiled a 2–1 record and was outscored by a total of 77 to 68.

== Schedule ==
Date	Opponent	Site	Result	Source
October 12	Fort Warren	Laramie, WY	W 12–2	
October 19	at Colorado Mines	Golden, CO	L 0–75	
November 29	at Fort Russell	Cheyenne, WY	W 56–0	
