= Albion Findlay =

American football and college basketball coach

Biographical details
- Born: August 15, 1880; Aurora, Illinois, U.S.
- Died: July 21, 1959 (aged 78); Chippewa Falls, Wisconsin, U.S.

Playing career

Football
- 1902–1905: Wisconsin
- 1906: Massillon Tigers
- Position: Halfback

Coaching career (HC unless noted)

Football
- 1907: Montana

Basketball
- 1907–1909: Montana

Head coaching record
- Overall: 4–1–1 (football); 6–3 (basketball)

Accomplishments and honors

Awards
- Third-team All-American (1905); First-team All-Western (1905)

Albion G. Findlay (August 15, 1880 – July 21, 1959) was an American football player and coach of football and basketball coach. He played college football at the University of Wisconsin from 1902 to 1905 and was named to the 1905 College Football All-America Team as a halfback. In 1906, he played with the Massillon Tigers and early professional football team of the Ohio League. Findlay served as the head football coach (1907) and head basketball coach (1907–1909) at the University of Montana. Findlay was also an instructor in geology at the school.

Findlay was born on August 15, 1880, in Aurora, Illinois. He died on July 21, 1959.

== Head coaching record ==
=== Football ===
Year	Team	Overall	Conference	Standing	Bowl/playoffs
Montana (Independent) (1907)
1907	Montana	4–1–1			
Montana:		4–1–1			
Total:		4–1–1			
