= 1904 USC Methodists football team =

American college football season

1904 USC Methodists football
- Conference: Independent
- Record: 6–1
- Head coach: Harvey Holmes (1st season)
- Captain: Jay Bickford

1904 Far West college football independents records
| | Conf. | | | Overall |
| Team | W | L | T | W | | L | | T |
|---|---|---|---|---|---|---|---|---|
| Utah | | – | | 7 | – | 1 | – | 0 |
| Stanford | | – | | 7 | – | 2 | – | 1 |
| California | | – | | 6 | – | 1 | – | 1 |
| USC | | – | | 6 | – | 1 | – | 0 |
| Idaho | | – | | 2 | – | 1 | – | 0 |
| Montana Agricultural | | – | | 2 | – | 1 | – | 0 |
| Oregon | | – | | 5 | – | 3 | – | 0 |
| Tempe Normal | | – | | 4 | – | 0 | – | 0 |
| Wyoming | | – | | 4 | – | 1 | – | 1 |
| Washington | | – | | 4 | – | 2 | – | 1 |
| Arizona | | – | | 3 | – | 1 | – | 2 |
| Oregon Agricultural | | – | | 4 | – | 2 | – | 0 |
| Montana | | – | | 3 | – | 2 | – | 0 |
| Nevada State | | – | | 3 | – | 3 | – | 0 |
| Washington Agricultural | | – | | 2 | – | 2 | – | 0 |
| New Mexico A&M | | – | | 1 | – | 2 | – | 1 |
| Utah Agricultural | | – | | 4 | – | 8 | – | 0 |

The 1904 USC Methodists football team was an American football team that represented the University of Southern California during the 1904 college football season. The team competed as an independent under head coach Harvey Holmes, compiling a 6–1 record.

== Schedule ==
| Date | Opponent | Site | Result | Attendance |
|---|---|---|---|---|
| October 15 | vs. Los Angeles High School | Fiesta Park; Los Angeles, CA | W 42–0 | 1,600 |
| October 22 | Throop | Los Angeles, CA | W 35–0 | 200 |
| October 29 | Occidental | Los Angeles, CA | W 36–4 | |
| November 5 | St. Vincent's (CA) | Los Angeles, CA | W forfeit | |
| November 5 | USC Prep | Los Angeles, CA | W 26–0 | |
| November 12 | vs. Sherman Institute | Eagle Park; Long Beach, CA | L 0–17 | |
| November 19 | at Whittier | Whittier, CA | W 60–6 | |
