= 1906 Oregon Webfoots football team =

American college football season

1906 Oregon Webfoots football
- Conference: Independent
- Record: 5–0–1
- Head coach: Hugo Bezdek (1st season)
- Captain: William Chandler
- Home stadium: Kincaid Field

1906 Western college football independents records
	Conf.			Overall
Team	W	L	T	W		L		T
Washington State		–		6	–	0	–	0
New Mexico A&M		–		4	–	0	–	0
Oregon		–		5	–	0	–	1
Colorado Mines		–		3	–	0	–	2
Utah		–		4	–	1	–	0
New Mexico		–		3	–	1	–	0
USC		–		2	–	0	–	2
Utah Agricultural		–		3	–	1	–	0
Oregon Agricultural		–		4	–	1	–	2
Washington		–		4	–	1	–	4
Wyoming		–		1	–	1	–	0
Idaho		–		2	–	4	–	0
Montana		–		2	–	4	–	0
Tempe Normal		–		0	–	2	–	0

The 1906 Oregon Webfoots football team represented the University of Oregon in the 1906 college football season. It was the Webfoots' 13th season; they competed as an independent and were led by head coach Hugo Bezdek. They finished the season with a record of five wins, zero losses and one tie (5–0–1).

== Schedule ==
Date	Opponent	Site	Result	Attendance	Source
October 26	at Idaho	Moscow, ID	W 12–0		
November 3	Willamette	Kincaid Field; Eugene, OR	W 4–0		
November 20	Washington	Kincaid Field; Eugene, OR (rivalry)	W 16–6	1,500	
November 24	at Oregon Agricultural College	College Field; Corvallis, OR (rivalry)	T 0–0		
November 30	at Multnomah Athletic Club	Multnomah Field; Portland, OR	W 8–4	8,000	
December 7	vs. Whitworth	Multnomah, OR	W 10–0		
