= 1904 Montana football team =

American college football season

1904 Montana football
- Conference: Independent
- Record: 3–2
- Head coach: Hiram Conibear (2nd season)

1904 Far West college football independents records
	Conf.			Overall
Team	W	L	T	W		L		T
Utah		–		7	–	1	–	0
Stanford		–		7	–	2	–	1
California		–		6	–	1	–	1
USC		–		6	–	1	–	0
Idaho		–		2	–	1	–	0
Montana Agricultural		–		2	–	1	–	0
Oregon		–		5	–	3	–	0
Tempe Normal		–		4	–	0	–	0
Wyoming		–		4	–	1	–	1
Washington		–		4	–	2	–	1
Arizona		–		3	–	1	–	2
Oregon Agricultural		–		4	–	2	–	0
Montana		–		3	–	2	–	0
Nevada State		–		3	–	3	–	0
Washington Agricultural		–		2	–	2	–	0
New Mexico A&M		–		1	–	2	–	1
Utah Agricultural		–		4	–	8	–	0

The 1904 Montana football team represented the University of Montana in the 1904 college football season. They were led by second-year head coach Hiram Conibear, and finished the season with a record of three wins and two losses (3–2).

== Schedule ==
Date	Opponent	Site	Result	Source
October 8	Fort Missoula	Missoula, MT	W 10–0	
October 15	at University of Utah	Cummings Field; Salt Lake City, UT	L 0–17	
October 17	Utah Agricultural	U.A.C. gridiron; Logan, UT	W 5–0	
November 16	Washington Agricultural	Missoula, MT	L 5–6	
November 24	Montana Agricultural	Missoula, MT (rivalry)	W 79–0	
