= Colfax Junior-Senior High School =

Coordinates: 46°53′33″N 117°21′38″W

Location
- 1110 North Morton Street; Colfax, (Whitman County), Washington 99111; United States

Information
- Type: Public high school
- Principal: David Gibb
- Staff: 16.34 (FTE)
- Enrollment: 262 (2023-2024)
- Student to teacher ratio: 16.03
- Colors: Royal blue and gold
- Nickname: Bulldogs

Colfax Junior-Senior High School is a comprehensive community middle school and public high school in the city of Colfax, Washington.

It is the only public Junior-Senior high school in the city and in the Colfax School District (#300).

== Athletics ==
Colfax Junior-Senior High School offers different sports for students to participate in.

During Fall, the school offers HS Cross Country, HS Football, HS Volleyball, JH Cross Country, JH Football, and JH Girls Basketball.

During Winter, the school offers HS B-G Basketball, JH Girls Volleyball, HS Wrestling, JH Wrestling, and JH Boys Basketball.

During Spring, the school offers HS Boys Baseball, HS Golf, HS Girls Softball, HS Track, and JH Track.

== School Mascot ==
Colfax Junior-Senior High School's mascot is the Bulldog.

== Extracurricular/Activities ==
Colfax Junior-Senior High School offers a great deal of extracurricular activity including: Knowledge Bowl, Future Problem Solvers, Honor Society, Cheerleading, Choir / Musical, Jazz / Concert Band, CHS League, Technology Club, FCCLA, Yearbook, SADD, and FFA.
