= 1904 New Mexico A&M Aggies football team =

American college football season

1904 New Mexico A&M Aggies football
- Conference: Independent
- Record: 1–2–1
- Head coach: John O. Miller (5th season)
- Home stadium: College Field

1904 Far West college football independents records
	Conf.			Overall
Team	W	L	T	W		L		T
Utah		–		7	–	1	–	0
Stanford		–		7	–	2	–	1
California		–		6	–	1	–	1
USC		–		6	–	1	–	0
Idaho		–		2	–	1	–	0
Montana Agricultural		–		2	–	1	–	0
Oregon		–		5	–	3	–	0
Tempe Normal		–		4	–	0	–	0
Wyoming		–		4	–	1	–	1
Washington		–		4	–	2	–	1
Arizona		–		3	–	1	–	2
Oregon Agricultural		–		4	–	2	–	0
Montana		–		3	–	2	–	0
Nevada State		–		3	–	3	–	0
Washington Agricultural		–		2	–	2	–	0
New Mexico A&M		–		1	–	2	–	1
Utah Agricultural		–		4	–	8	–	0

The 1904 New Mexico A&M Aggies football team was an American football team that represented New Mexico College of Agriculture and Mechanical Arts (now known as New Mexico State University) as an independent during the 1904 college football season. In their fifth year under head coach John O. Miller, the Aggies compiled a 1–2–1 record and outscored opponents by a total of 42 to 33. The team played home games on College Field, later renamed Miller Field in honor of coach Miller.

== Schedule ==
Date	Opponent	Site	Result	Attendance	Source
	Mesilla		W 36–0		
November 17	at El Paso Athletics	Athletic park; El Paso, TX	T 0–0	500	
November 24	at Albuquerque Athletic Association	Fair grounds; Albuquerque, New Mexico Territory	L 0–22		
December 10	Fort Bliss	Mesilla Park, New Mexico Territory	L 6–11		
