= 1904 University of Utah football team =

American college football season

1904 University of Utah football
- Conference: Independent
- Record: 7–1
- Head coach: Joe Maddock (1st season)
- Captain: Jimmy Wade
- Home stadium: Cummings Field

1904 Far West college football independents records
	Conf.			Overall
Team	W	L	T	W		L		T
Utah		–		7	–	1	–	0
Stanford		–		7	–	2	–	1
California		–		6	–	1	–	1
USC		–		6	–	1	–	0
Idaho		–		2	–	1	–	0
Montana Agricultural		–		2	–	1	–	0
Oregon		–		5	–	3	–	0
Tempe Normal		–		4	–	0	–	0
Wyoming		–		4	–	1	–	1
Washington		–		4	–	2	–	1
Arizona		–		3	–	1	–	2
Oregon Agricultural		–		4	–	2	–	0
Montana		–		3	–	2	–	0
Nevada State		–		3	–	3	–	0
Washington Agricultural		–		2	–	2	–	0
New Mexico A&M		–		1	–	2	–	1
Utah Agricultural		–		4	–	8	–	0

The 1904 University of Utah football team was an American football team that represented the University of Utah as an independent during the 1904 college football season. In its first season under head coach Joe Maddock, the team compiled a 7–1 record, shut out six of eight opponents, and outscored all opponents by a total of 301 to 38. Quarterback Jimmy Wade was the team captain.

The team shut out three opponents in eight days in three cities: on October 29 at Denver (12–0); on October 31 at Wyoming (23–0); and on November 5 at home against the soldiers from Fort Douglas (107–5). The team's 107 points against Fort Douglas was a school record at the time and remains the second-highest point total in school history.

On November 19, 1904, Fred Bennion kicked a 55-yard field goal that was a school record until 1971.

Coach Maddock had been a star tackle on Michigan's 1902 and 1903 Point-a-Minute teams. Maddock was hired in February 1904 by University of Utah president Kingsbury upon the recommendation of Michigan coach Fielding H. Yost. Maddock was promised "complete control" of the Utah football team after graduating from Michigan in June. Maddock arrived in Salt Lake City to begin his coaching responsibilities on September 10, 1904.

== Schedule ==
Date	Opponent	Site	Result	Attendance	Source
October 1	Colorado	Cummings Field; Salt Lake City, UT (rivalry)	L 6–33		
October 15	Montana	Cummings Field; Salt Lake City, UT	W 17–0		
October 22	Oregon Short Line	Cummings Field; Salt Lake City, UT	W 50–0		
October 29	at Denver	Denver, CO	W 12–0	2,000	
October 31	at Wyoming	Laramie, WY	W 23–0		
November 5	Fort Douglas	Cummings Field; Salt Lake City, UT	W 107–5		
November 19	Utah Agricultural	Cummings Field; Salt Lake City, UT (rivalry)	W 43–0		
November 24	Colorado College	Cummings Field; Salt Lake City, UT	W 43–0		
