= 1906 Oregon Agricultural Aggies football team =

American college football season

1906 Oregon Agricultural Aggies football
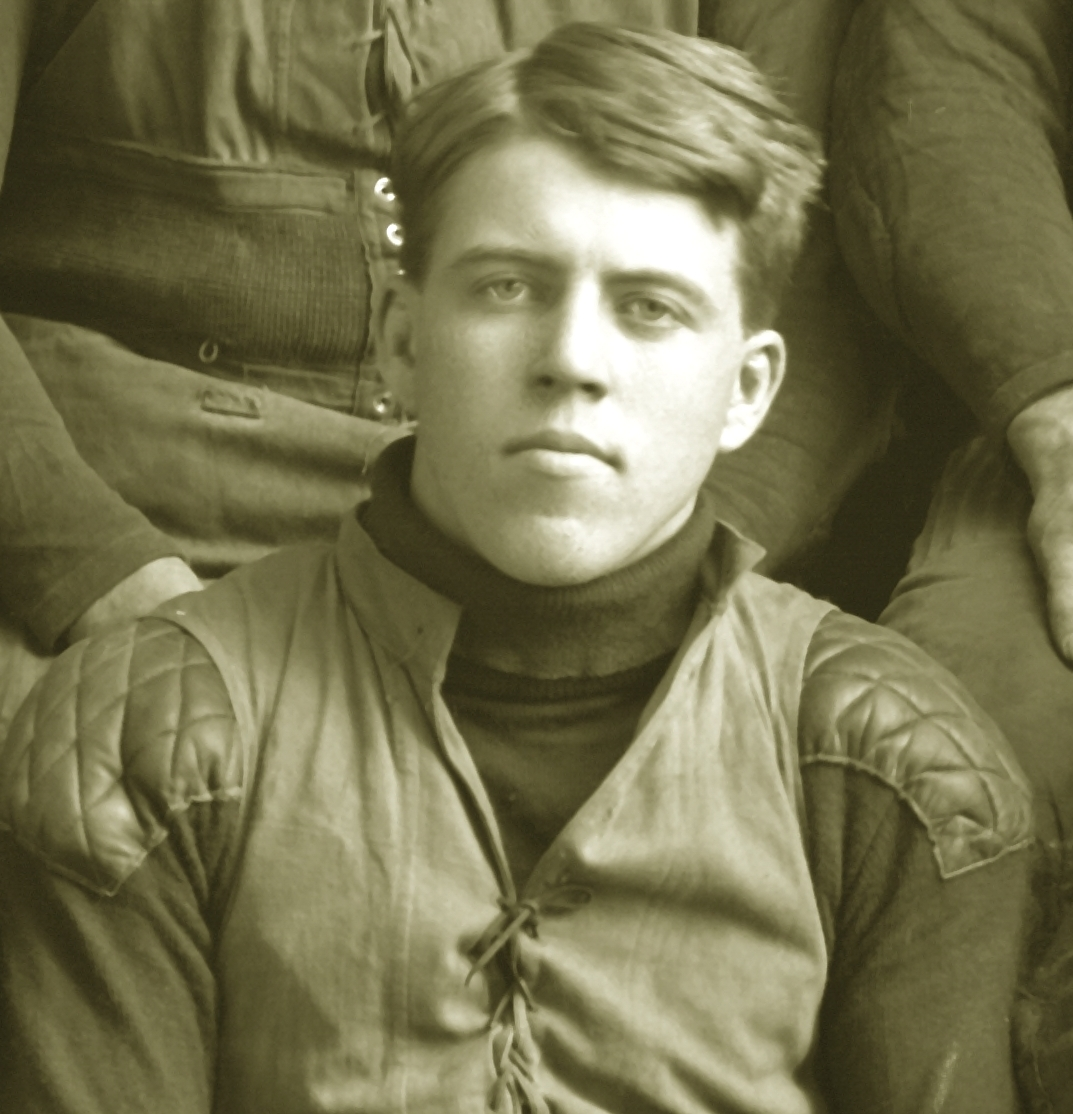
- Coach Fred Norcross in 1903
- Conference: Independent
- Record: 4–1–2
- Head coach: Fred Norcross (1st season)
- Captain: "Fat" Cherry
- Home stadium: OAC Field

1906 Western college football independents records
	Conf.			Overall
Team	W	L	T	W		L		T
Washington State		–		6	–	0	–	0
New Mexico A&M		–		4	–	0	–	0
Oregon		–		5	–	0	–	1
Colorado Mines		–		3	–	0	–	2
Utah		–		4	–	1	–	0
New Mexico		–		3	–	1	–	0
USC		–		2	–	0	–	2
Utah Agricultural		–		3	–	1	–	0
Oregon Agricultural		–		4	–	1	–	2
Washington		–		4	–	1	–	4
Wyoming		–		1	–	1	–	0
Idaho		–		2	–	4	–	0
Montana		–		2	–	4	–	0
Tempe Normal		–		0	–	2	–	0

The 1906 Oregon Agricultural Aggies football team represented Oregon Agricultural College (now known as Oregon State University) as an independent during the 1906 college football season. In their first season under head coach Fred Norcross, the Aggies compiled a 4–1–2 record, held six of seven opponents scoreless, and outscored their opponents by a combined total of 78 to 4. The Aggies played to scoreless ties against Oregon and Washington and lost to Willamette (0–4). Herb Root was the team captain.

== Background ==
As the 1906–07 school year began at Oregon Agricultural College, thoughts were already on football. The front page of the debut issue of the campus newspaper, The College Barometer, delved into the changes afoot on the OAC gridiron. "We had heard of the resignation of both our coach and athletic manager and naturally we felt rather blue," the writer opined. "But things cleared up again when we hear that Norcross, Michigan's fast captain, was to be our coach.

Forty-five team uniforms were already spoken for, with others anxious to make the squad. Every day after classes concluded, between 25 and 40 aspirants took the field to practice, anticipating the arrival of the coach.

Norcross arrived in Corvallis on Friday, September 21, on the noon train and quickly assumed control over the team. A new manager was also named, Mark McAllister of the OAC class of 1905. Practice continued on a daily basis, with 50 uniformed hopefuls now out for the varsity, with demand continuing to outstrip supply of jerseys.

There was much anticipation of seeing a game under the "new rules", which permitted use of the forward pass for the first time. Norcross had new material to teach the new rules of the game — only one regular from the 1905 OAC squad was returning for the 1906 season, team captain "Fat" Cherry, along with half a dozen reserve players. The rest of the team would be new.

== Schedule ==
Date	Opponent	Site	Result	Source
October 13	Albany Athletic Club	OAC Field; Corvallis, OR	W 24–0	
October 20	O.A.C. alumni	OAC Field; Corvallis, OR	W 16–0	
October 27	at Washington	Denny Field; Seattle, WA	T 0–0	
November 3	Pacific (OR)	OAC Field; Corvallis, OR	W 28–0	
November 10	Dalles Athletic Club	OAC Field; Corvallis, OR	W 9–0	
November 24	Oregon	OAC Field; Corvallis, OR (rivalry)	T 0–0	
November 29	at Willamette	Salem, OR	L 0–4	

== Roster ==
The 1906 OAC varsity team, with coach F.S. Norcross at the far right.

According to the 1908 edition of the OAC student yearbook, which covered the exploits of the 1906–07 athletic teams, the roster of the OAC varsity included the following:

• Harding, left end
• Shannon, left end
• Bennett, left tackle
• Barber, left guard
• Clarke, left guard
• Cherry, center
• Pendergrass, right guard
• Darby, right tackle
• Finn, right tackle
• Dobbin, right end
• Gagnon, quarterback
• Cady, left halfback
• Looney, left halfback
• Hannan, right halfback
• Wolfe, fullback
