= 1904 Wyoming Cowboys football team =

American college football season

1904 Wyoming Cowboys football
- Conference: Independent
- Record: 4–1–1
- Head coach: William McMurray (5th season)
- Captain: J. Gillespie

1904 Far West college football independents records
| | Conf. | | | Overall |
| Team | W | L | T | W | | L | | T |
|---|---|---|---|---|---|---|---|---|
| Utah | | – | | 7 | – | 1 | – | 0 |
| Stanford | | – | | 7 | – | 2 | – | 1 |
| California | | – | | 6 | – | 1 | – | 1 |
| USC | | – | | 6 | – | 1 | – | 0 |
| Idaho | | – | | 2 | – | 1 | – | 0 |
| Montana Agricultural | | – | | 2 | – | 1 | – | 0 |
| Oregon | | – | | 5 | – | 3 | – | 0 |
| Tempe Normal | | – | | 4 | – | 0 | – | 0 |
| Wyoming | | – | | 4 | – | 1 | – | 1 |
| Washington | | – | | 4 | – | 2 | – | 1 |
| Arizona | | – | | 3 | – | 1 | – | 2 |
| Oregon Agricultural | | – | | 4 | – | 2 | – | 0 |
| Montana | | – | | 3 | – | 2 | – | 0 |
| Nevada State | | – | | 3 | – | 3 | – | 0 |
| Washington Agricultural | | – | | 2 | – | 2 | – | 0 |
| New Mexico A&M | | – | | 1 | – | 2 | – | 1 |
| Utah Agricultural | | – | | 4 | – | 8 | – | 0 |

The 1904 Wyoming Cowboys football team represented the University of Wyoming as an independent during the 1904 college football season. In its fifth season under head coach William McMurray, the team compiled a 4–1–1 record and outscored opponents by a total of 97 to 35. J. Gillespie was the team captain.

== Schedule ==
| Date | Opponent | Site | Result | Source |
|---|---|---|---|---|
| October 15 | Cheyenne High School | Laramie, WY | W 56–0 | |
| October 31 | Utah | Laramie, WY | L 0–23 | |
| November 8 | at Cheyenne High School | Cheyenne, WY | W 12–6 | |
| November 12 | Wyoming faculty | Laramie, WY | W 11–0 | |
| November 19 | at Fort Warren | Cheyenne, WY | W 12–0 | |
| November 24 | Colorado Agricultural | Laramie, WY (rivalry) | T 6–6 | |
