= 1904 Arizona football team =

American college football season

1904 Arizona football
- Conference: Independent
- Record: 3–1–2
- Head coach: Orin A. Kates (2nd season)
- Captain: Burrell R. Hatcher

1904 Far West college football independents records
	Conf.			Overall
Team	W	L	T	W		L		T
Utah		–		7	–	1	–	0
Stanford		–		7	–	2	–	1
California		–		6	–	1	–	1
USC		–		6	–	1	–	0
Idaho		–		2	–	1	–	0
Montana Agricultural		–		2	–	1	–	0
Oregon		–		5	–	3	–	0
Tempe Normal		–		4	–	0	–	0
Wyoming		–		4	–	1	–	1
Washington		–		4	–	2	–	1
Arizona		–		3	–	1	–	2
Oregon Agricultural		–		4	–	2	–	0
Montana		–		3	–	2	–	0
Nevada State		–		3	–	3	–	0
Washington Agricultural		–		2	–	2	–	0
New Mexico A&M		–		1	–	2	–	1
Utah Agricultural		–		4	–	8	–	0

The 1904 Arizona football team was an American football team that represented the University of Arizona as independent during the 1904 college football season. In its second season under head coach Orin A. Kates, the team compiled a 3–1–2 record and outscored opponents by a total of 66 to 48. The team captain was Burrell R. Hatcher.

== Schedule ==
Date	Opponent	Site	Result	Source
	Tucson Indian School	Tucson, Arizona Territory	T 0–0	
	Tucson Indian School	Tucson, Arizona Territory	W 6–5	
October 29	Phoenix High School	Tucson, Arizona Territory	L 0–37	
	Tucson Indian School	Tucson, Arizona Territory	W 26–0	
	Tucson Indian School	Tucson, Arizona Territory	W 28–0	
November 24	Tombstone	Tucson, Arizona Territory	T 6–6	
