= 1904 California Golden Bears football team =

American college football season

1904 California Golden Bears football
- Conference: Independent
- Record: 6–1–1
- Head coach: James Hopper (1st season)
- Captain: Benjamin K. Stroud
- Home stadium: California Field

1904 Far West college football independents records
| | Conf. | | | Overall |
| Team | W | L | T | W | | L | | T |
|---|---|---|---|---|---|---|---|---|
| Utah | | – | | 7 | – | 1 | – | 0 |
| Stanford | | – | | 7 | – | 2 | – | 1 |
| California | | – | | 6 | – | 1 | – | 1 |
| USC | | – | | 6 | – | 1 | – | 0 |
| Idaho | | – | | 2 | – | 1 | – | 0 |
| Oregon | | – | | 5 | – | 3 | – | 0 |
| Tempe Normal | | – | | 4 | – | 0 | – | 0 |
| Wyoming | | – | | 4 | – | 1 | – | 1 |
| Washington | | – | | 4 | – | 2 | – | 1 |
| Arizona | | – | | 3 | – | 1 | – | 2 |
| Oregon Agricultural | | – | | 4 | – | 2 | – | 0 |
| Montana | | – | | 3 | – | 2 | – | 0 |
| Nevada State | | – | | 3 | – | 3 | – | 0 |
| Washington Agricultural | | – | | 2 | – | 2 | – | 0 |
| New Mexico A&M | | – | | 1 | – | 2 | – | 1 |
| Utah Agricultural | | – | | 4 | – | 8 | – | 0 |

The 1904 California Golden Bears football team was an American football team that represented the University of California, Berkeley during the 1904 college football season. The team competed as an independent under head coach James Hopper and compiled a record of 6–1–1. This marked the team's inaugural season at California Field.

== Schedule ==
| Date | Time | Opponent | Site | Result | Attendance | Source |
|---|---|---|---|---|---|---|
| October 1 | | Sherman Indians | California Field; Berkeley, CA | W 6–0 | | |
| October 8 | | Olympic Club | California Field; Berkeley, CA | W 10–0 | | |
| October 18 | | Multnomah Athletic Club | California Field; Berkeley, CA | W 20–0 | | |
| October 22 | | Oregon | California Field; Berkeley, CA | W 12–0 | 4,000 | |
| October 29 | | Pomona | California Field; Berkeley, CA | W 5–0 | | |
| November 5 | | Nevada State | California Field; Berkeley, CA | W 16–0 | | |
| November 12 | | Stanford | California Field; Berkeley, CA (Big Game) | L 0–18 | | |
| November 24 | 1:00 p.m. | at Washington | Recreation Park; Seattle, WA | T 6–6 | 3,000 | |
All times are in Pacific time
