= 1904 Utah Agricultural Aggies football team =

American college football season

1904 Utah Agricultural Aggies football
- Conference: Independent
- Record: 4–8
- Head coach: George P. Campbell (3rd season)
- Home stadium: U.A.C. gridiron

1904 Far West college football independents records
| | Conf. | | | Overall |
| Team | W | L | T | W | | L | | T |
|---|---|---|---|---|---|---|---|---|
| Utah | | – | | 7 | – | 1 | – | 0 |
| Stanford | | – | | 7 | – | 2 | – | 1 |
| California | | – | | 6 | – | 1 | – | 1 |
| USC | | – | | 6 | – | 1 | – | 0 |
| Idaho | | – | | 2 | – | 1 | – | 0 |
| Montana Agricultural | | – | | 2 | – | 1 | – | 0 |
| Oregon | | – | | 5 | – | 3 | – | 0 |
| Tempe Normal | | – | | 4 | – | 0 | – | 0 |
| Wyoming | | – | | 4 | – | 1 | – | 1 |
| Washington | | – | | 4 | – | 2 | – | 1 |
| Arizona | | – | | 3 | – | 1 | – | 2 |
| Oregon Agricultural | | – | | 4 | – | 2 | – | 0 |
| Montana | | – | | 3 | – | 2 | – | 0 |
| Nevada State | | – | | 3 | – | 3 | – | 0 |
| Washington Agricultural | | – | | 2 | – | 2 | – | 0 |
| New Mexico A&M | | – | | 1 | – | 2 | – | 1 |
| Utah Agricultural | | – | | 4 | – | 8 | – | 0 |

The 1904 Utah Agricultural Aggies football team was an American football team that represented Utah Agricultural College (later renamed Utah State University) as an independent during the 1904 college football season. In their third season under head coach George P. Campbell, the Aggies compiled a 4–8 record and were outscored by opponents by a total of 253 to 63.

The season featured a three-week trip to the west coast during which the Aggies played and lost five road games against Washington (45–0), Oregon Agricultural (45–0), Multnomah Athletic Club (29–0), Stanford (57–0), and Nevada (24–5). Prior to 1904, the Aggies had never played a game outside the state of Utah and had never played more than six games in a season.

Fullback Roy Egbert was one of the bright spots in the Aggies' 1904 season. At the end of the season, he was chosen by his teammates to be captain of the 1905 team.

== Schedule ==
| Date | Opponent | Site | Result | Attendance | Source |
|---|---|---|---|---|---|
| October 1 | Ogden High School | U.A.C. gridiron; Logan, UT | W 21–0 | | |
| October 8 | Salt Lake High School | U.A.C. gridiron; Logan, UT | W 5–0 | | |
| October 17 | Montana | U.A.C. gridiron; Logan, UT | L 0–5 | | |
| October 22 | at Washington | Seattle, WA | L 0–45 | | |
| October 26 | at Oregon Agricultural | Corvallis, OR | L 0–45 | | |
| October 29 | at Multnomah Athletic Club | Portland, OR | L 0–29 | | |
| November 5 | at Stanford | Stanford, CA | L 0–57 | 1,800 | |
| November 9 | at Nevada State | Evans Field; Reno, NV | L 5–24 | | |
| November 19 | at Utah | Cummings Field; Salt Lake City, UT (rivalry) | L 0–43 | | |
| | at Academy of Idaho | Pocatello, ID | W 10–0 | | |
| | Academy of Idaho | Logan, UT | W 22–0 | | |
| | at Montana Agricultural | Bozeman, MT | L 0–5 | | |
