= 1904 Tempe Normal Owls football team =

American college football season

1904 Tempe Normal Owls football
- Conference: Independent
- Record: 4–0
- Head coach: Frederick M. Irish (6th season)
- Home stadium: Normal Field

1904 Far West college football independents records
	Conf.			Overall
Team	W	L	T	W		L		T
Utah		–		7	–	1	–	0
Stanford		–		7	–	2	–	1
California		–		6	–	1	–	1
USC		–		6	–	1	–	0
Idaho		–		2	–	1	–	0
Montana Agricultural		–		2	–	1	–	0
Oregon		–		5	–	3	–	0
Tempe Normal		–		4	–	0	–	0
Wyoming		–		4	–	1	–	1
Washington		–		4	–	2	–	1
Arizona		–		3	–	1	–	2
Oregon Agricultural		–		4	–	2	–	0
Montana		–		3	–	2	–	0
Nevada State		–		3	–	3	–	0
Washington Agricultural		–		2	–	2	–	0
New Mexico A&M		–		1	–	2	–	1
Utah Agricultural		–		4	–	8	–	0

The 1904 Tempe Normal Owls football team was an American football team that represented Tempe Normal School (later renamed Arizona State University) as an independent during the 1904 college football season. In their sixth season under head coach Frederick M. Irish, the Owls compiled a 4–0 record, shut out all four opponents, and outscored their opponents by a combined total of 116 to 0. The team won games against the Phoenix High School (two games: 15–0, 30–0) and the Phoenix Indians (two games: 24–0, 47–0).

== Schedule ==
Opponent	Site	Result
Phoenix High School	Normal Field; Tempe, Arizona Territory	W 15–0
Phoenix Indian School	Normal Field; Tempe, Arizona Territory	W 24–0
at Phoenix High School	Phoenix, Arizona Territory	W 30–0
Phoenix Indian School	Normal Field; Tempe, Arizona Territory	W 47–0
