= Whitman Fighting Missionaries football, 1900–1909 =

American college football seasons

Whitman Fighting Missionaries football, 1900–1909 encompassed the second decade of college football at Whitman College.

== 1900 ==
1900 Whitman Fighting Missionaries football
- Conference: Independent
- Head coach: Dorsey Hill

== 1901 ==
1901 Whitman Fighting Missionaries football
- Conference: Independent
- Head coach: Allen (1st season)
- Captain: Hauerbach

== 1902 ==
1902 Whitman Fighting Missionaries football
- Conference: Independent
- Head coach: Allen (2nd season)
- Captain: Ed Chittenden

== 1903 ==
1903 Whitman Fighting Missionaries football
- Conference: Independent
- Record: 2–4
- Head coach: Allen (3rd season)
- Captain: "Hez" Brown

=== Schedule ===
Date	Opponent	Site	Result	Attendance	Source
October 17	Spokane High School		W 24–0		
October 24	at Washington	Athletic Park; Seattle, WA	L 0–35		
October 26	at Puget Sound	Tacoma, WA	L 6–36		
November 13	at Idaho	Moscow, ID	L 0–36		
	Walla Walla Athletic Club	Walla Walla, WA	W 18–0		
November 26	Washington Agricultural	Walla Walla, WA	L 6–18	1,500	

== 1904 ==
1904 Whitman Fighting Missionaries football
- Conference: Independent
- Record: 2–3
- Head coach: Dorsey Hill
- Captain: Roy Virgil Peringer

The 1904 Whitman Fighting Missionaries football team represented Whitman College during the 1904 college football season.

=== Schedule ===
Date	Opponent	Site	Result	Source
October 8	at Washington	Madison Park; Seattle, WA	L 0–33	
October 10	Whitworth		W 18–0	
November 12	Idaho	Walla Walla, WA	L 0–18	
November 19	Fort Walla Walla		W 36–0	
November 24	Washington Agricultural	Walla Walla, WA	L 0–33	

== 1905 ==
1905 Whitman Fighting Missionaries football
- Conference: Independent

== 1906 ==
1906 Whitman Fighting Missionaries football
- Conference: Independent
- Record: 4–2–1
- Head coach: J. Arthur Baird (1st season)
- Captain: Frank Spagle

=== Schedule ===
Date	Opponent	Site	Result	Attendance	Source
October 6	Pendleton High School		W 23–0		
October 16	Spokane High School		W 16–0		
October 24	Willamette		W 10–5		
October 27	Multnomah Athletic Club		L 0–9		
November 3	at Washington	Denny Field; Seattle, WA	T 0–0	2,500	
November 17	Idaho	Walla Walla, WA	W 6–5		
November 24	at Washington State	Rogers Field; Pullman, WA	L 0–6		

== 1907 ==
1907 Whitman Fighting Missionaries football
- Conference: Independent
- Head coach: J. Arthur Baird (2nd season)
- Captain: Ralph Dimick
