= California Field =

College football stadium in Berkeley, California

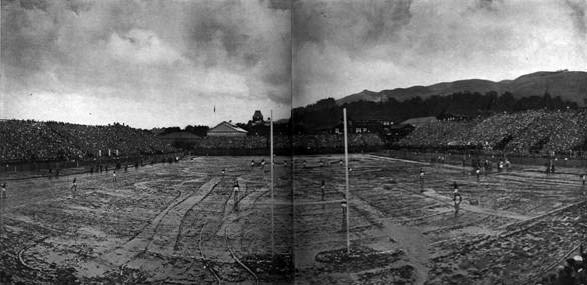
- The Big Game of 1912 at California Field, played under rugby rules

- Location in the United States Location in California
- Location: University of California; Berkeley, California, U.S.
- Coordinates: 37.8697°N 122.257°W
- Owner: University of California
- Capacity: 25,000 (estimated)

Construction
- Opened: 1904; 122 years ago
- Closed: 1922; 104 years ago

California Field was an outdoor college football stadium on the campus of the University of California, Berkeley. It served as the home field for the California Golden Bears from 1904 through 1922.

== History ==
California Field opened its doors in 1904 to replace the antiquated West Field and the boosted capacity allowed California to host important games for the first time. Before California Field opened, the Bears had played important games (namely the Big Game) at neutral site venues in San Francisco, and with a new over 20,000-seat stadium California was able to host the first Big Game played outside San Francisco. (Note: More than 25,000 people would often overcrowd the seats during the Wonder Teams years.)

The new stadium was located much closer to the center of campus (where Hearst Gymnasium now stands) and was able to draw unprecedented crowds for the time. California Field is also notable because it is where many of California's longstanding traditions began to take form. In 1910, the first card stunt was performed at the Big Game and after victories, the students would "serpentine" around the field—something that is mentioned in the song "Big C".

California Field is also where the Golden Bears gained national prominence under head coach Andrew Latham Smith. Four of the Bears' five consecutive undefeated seasons were played at California Field; the stadium was home to three of California's four straight (claimed) national championships. Because of this success, California needed an even larger venue to host its football team; therefore, the team and its fans began pushing for a new stadium. Work on the California Memorial Stadium began in January 1923.

The stadium also hosted the first ever international rugby matches played by the United States national rugby team: United States v. Australia in 1912 and United States v. New Zealand in 1913, both matches drawing 10,000 fans.

After the 1905 season, California did not have a football team for the nine autumns (1906–1914), but continued with rugby; football returned in 1915.

The approximate elevation of California Field was three hundred feet (90 m) above sea level.
