= Fiesta Park =

Sports and entertainment venue in Los Angeles, California

- Interactive map of Fiesta Park
- Address: 12th and Grand
- Location: Los Angeles, California
- Coordinates: 34.040056°N 118.264279°W
- Surface: Natural grass

Construction
- Opened: 1894
- Closed: 1916

Tenants
- USC Trojans football (NCAA) (1897–98, 1904–06, 1916); St. Vincent's College football (NCAA)

Fiesta Park was a grandstand and sports and entertainment venue in South Park, Los Angeles, California. From 1894 to 1916, it served as venue for various exhibitions and festivals, as well as a field for USC Trojans football games.

== History ==
Fiesta Park was located in a block bordered by Grand Avenue, 12th Street, Hope Street, and Pico Boulevard. This lot had originally belonged to Victor Ponet, a banker and undertaker who also founded Evergreen Cemetery. From 1894 to 1916, it served as a venue for La Fiesta de Los Angeles, a springtime parade and festival celebrating Los Angeles' multicultural heritage. In 1901, then-President William McKinley was an honored guest at the Fiesta during a trip to the West Coast.

Around the turn of the century, the grounds were used for a variety of sports and entertainment events, ranging from football and baseball games to pony races to a production of "Faust". A number of minor league baseball teams played at Fiesta Park, including the Los Angeles Trilbeys and Los Angeles Echoes. The grounds served as the home field for the Los Angeles Rangers soccer club, a side composed primarily of expatriate Englishmen. In 1910, Fiesta Park was covered with a canvas big top and pressed into service as the venue for the Los Angeles Auto Show. This event coincided with a move by many of the California schools from football to rugby, so following the 1910 Auto Show, Fiesta Park was used primarily for tented exhibitions, though bleachers were restored in time for the 1916 football season. Following World War I, the festival was discontinued and the grandstands were transported to Bovard Field.

== Football ==
The USC Trojans (then called the Fighting Methodists) played several football games in the 1890s and all of their 1916 home football schedule at Fiesta Park. Fiesta Park also served as a home field for St. Vincent's College (now Loyola Marymount University)'s football team. Occidental College also played some home games in the stadium, as did numerous high school teams, particularly Los Angeles High School (then located Downtown on Fort Moore Hill) and Polytechnic High School. In the first decade of the 20th century, USC played LA High annually, with the game usually being played at Fiesta Park.
