= 1901 Cheney Normal football team =

American college football season

1901 Cheney Normal football
- Conference: Independent
- Record: 1–2

1901 Far West college football independents records
	Conf.			Overall
Team	W	L	T	W		L		T
Wyoming		–		1	–	0	–	0
California		–		9	–	0	–	1
Arizona		–		4	–	1	–	0
Washington Agricultural		–		4	–	1	–	0
Utah		–		3	–	1	–	0
Montana Agricultural		–		2	–	1	–	0
New Mexico A&M		–		2	–	1	–	0
Utah Agricultural		–		3	–	2	–	0
Stanford		–		3	–	2	–	2
Idaho		–		3	–	2	–	1
Washington		–		3	–	3	–	0
Nevada State		–		3	–	3	–	0
Oregon		–		3	–	4	–	1
Montana		–		2	–	3	–	0
Cheney Normal		–		1	–	2	–	0
Oregon Agricultural		–		1	–	2	–	0
New Mexico		–		0	–	3	–	1
USC		–		0	–	2	–	0

The 1901 Cheney Normal football team represented the State Normal School at Cheney—now known as Eastern Washington University—as an independent during the 1901 college football season. The team compiled a record of 1–2.

== Schedule ==
Date	Opponent	Site	Result	Attendance	Source
October 26	at Spokane High School	Natatorium Park; Spokane, WA	L 0–6	350	
November 9	Spokane High School	Cheney, WA	W 10–6	100	
November 15	at Lewiston State Normal	Lewiston, ID	L 0–17		
