= List of Utah Utes head football coaches =

The Utah Utes football program is a college football team that represents the University of Utah. The team has had 23 head coaches since organized football began in 1892. Harvey Holmes was the first paid head coach, and the Utes have had 17 paid, professional head coaches. The Utes have played in more than 1,000 games during its 116 seasons. In those seasons, 5 coaches have led the Utes to postseason bowl games: Ike Armstrong, Ray Nagel, Ron McBride, Urban Meyer, and Kyle Whittingham. 7 coaches have won conference championships with the Utes: Thomas Fitzpatrick, Armstrong, Jack "Cactus Jack" Curtice, Nagel, McBride, Meyer, and Whittingham. Armstrong is the all-time leader in number of games coached with 211, years coached with 25, and total wins with 141. Meyer is the all-time leader in winning percentage with a percentage of .917 in his two seasons at Utah. Tom Lovat is, in terms of winning percentage, the worst coach the Utes have had with a percentage of .152 during his three seasons as head coach (with the exception of Walter Shoup who only coached one game in 1895.)

Of the 23 Utes head coaches, Ike Armstrong and Urban Meyer have been inducted into the College Football Hall of Fame. Kyle Whittingham is the current head coach and has received National Coach of the Year honors from multiple organizations. He was hired in December 2004.

== Key ==
Key to symbols in coaches list
| General | | Overall | | Conference | | Postseason (Note: Although the first Rose Bowl Game was played in 1902, it has been continuously played since the 1916 game, and is recognized as the oldest bowl game by the NCAA. "—" indicates any season prior to 1916 when postseason games were not played.) | |
|---|---|---|---|---|---|---|---|
| No. | Order of coaches (Note: A running total of the number of head coaches, with coaches who served separate tenures being counted only once. Interim head coaches are represented with "Int" and are not counted in the running total. "—" indicates the team played but either without a coach or no coach is on record. "X" indicates an interim year without play.) | GC | Games coached | CW | Conference wins | PW | Postseason wins |
| DC | Division championships | OW | Overall wins | CL | Conference losses | PL | Postseason losses |
| CC | Conference championships | OL | Overall losses | CT | Conference ties | PT | Postseason ties |
| NC | National championships | OT | Overall ties (Note: Overtime rules in college football were introduced in 1996, making ties impossible in the period since.) | C% | Conference winning percentage | | |
| † | Elected to the College Football Hall of Fame | O% | Overall winning percentage (Note: When computing the win–loss percentage, a tie counts as half a win and half a loss.) | | | | |

== Coaches ==
List of head football coaches showing season(s) coached, overall records, conference records, postseason records, championships and selected awards (Note: Statistics correct as of the end of the 2025 NCAA Division I FBS football season.)
| No. | Image | Name | Term | Overall | | | | | Conference | | | | Postseason | | | | CCs | Accomplishments | Ref. |
| No. | Image | Name | Term | GC | OW | OL | OT | O% | CW | CL | CT | C% | PW | PL | PT | Win% | CCs | Accomplishments | Ref. |
|---|---|---|---|---|---|---|---|---|---|---|---|---|---|---|---|---|---|---|---|
| 1 | | Robert Harkness | 1894 | 3 | 1 | 2 | 0 | .333 | — | — | — | — | — | — | — | — | — | — | — |
| 2 | | Walter Shoup | 1895 | 1 | 0 | 1 | 0 | .000 | — | — | — | — | — | — | — | — | — | — | — |
| 3 | | C. B. Ferris | 1896 | 5 | 3 | 2 | 0 | .600 | — | — | — | — | — | — | — | — | — | — | — |
| 4 | | Byron Cummings | 1897 | 6 | 1 | 5 | 0 | .167 | — | — | — | — | — | — | — | — | — | — | — |
| 5 | | Benjamin Wilson | 1898 | 3 | 2 | 1 | 0 | .667 | — | — | — | — | — | — | — | — | — | — | — |
| 6 | | Charles Gatehouse | 1899 | 3 | 2 | 1 | 0 | .667 | — | — | — | — | — | — | — | — | — | — | — |
| 7 | | Harvey Holmes | 1900–1903 | 23 | 13 | 9 | 1 | .587 | — | — | — | — | — | — | — | — | — | — | — |
| 8 | | Joe Maddock | 1904–1909 | 38 | 28 | 9 | 1 | .750 | — | — | — | — | — | — | — | — | — | — | — |
| 9 | | Fred Bennion | 1910–1913 | 27 | 16 | 8 | 3 | .648 | 10 | 6 | 1 | .618 | — | — | — | — | — | — | — |
| 10 | | Nelson Norgren | 1914–1917 | 24 | 13 | 11 | 0 | .542 | 10 | 10 | 0 | .500 | — | — | — | — | — | — | — |
| 11 | | Thomas Fitzpatrick | 1919–1924 | 43 | 23 | 17 | 3 | .570 | 17 | 10 | 3 | .617 | — | — | — | — | 1 | — | — |
| 12 | | Ike Armstrong† | 1925–1949 | 211 | 141 | 55 | 15 | .704 | 108 | 24 | 8 | .800 | 1 | 1 (Note: The Pineapple Bowl, which was Armstrong's only loss in a bowl game, was not an NCAA certified bowl game and counts a regular season loss in official NCAA records.) | 0 | .500 | 13 | — | |
| 13 | | Jack Curtice | 1950–1957 | 81 | 45 | 32 | 4 | .580 | 32 | 9 | 2 | .767 | — | — | — | — | 4 | — | — |
| 14 | | Ray Nagel | 1958–1965 | 82 | 42 | 39 | 1 | .518 | 21 | 17 | 1 | .551 | 1 | 0 | 0 | 1.000 | 1 | — | — |
| 15 | | Mike Giddings | 1966–1967 | 21 | 9 | 12 | 0 | .429 | 5 | 5 | 0 | .500 | — | — | — | — | — | — | — |
| 16 | | Bill Meek | 1968–1973 | 64 | 33 | 31 | 0 | .516 | 23 | 14 | 0 | .622 | — | — | — | — | — | — | — |
| 17 | | Tom Lovat | 1974–1976 | 33 | 5 | 28 | 0 | .152 | 5 | 12 | 0 | .294 | — | — | — | — | — | — | — |
| 18 | | Wayne Howard | 1977–1981 | 56 | 30 | 24 | 2 | .554 | 17 | 13 | 2 | .563 | — | — | — | — | — | — | — |
| 19 | | Chuck Stobart | 1982–1984 | 34 | 16 | 17 | 1 | .485 | 10 | 11 | 1 | .477 | — | — | — | — | — | — | — |
| 20 | | Jim Fassel | 1985–1989 | 58 | 25 | 33 | 0 | .431 | 14 | 26 | 0 | .350 | — | — | — | — | — | — | — |
| 21 | | Ron McBride | 1990–2002 | 151 | 88 | 63 | 0 | .583 | 58 | 42 | 0 | .580 | 3 | 3 | 0 | .500 | 2 | — | — |
| 22 | | Urban Meyer† | 2003–2004 | 24 | 22 | 2 | 0 | .917 | 13 | 1 | 0 | .929 | 2 | 0 | 0 | 1.000 | 2 | The Sporting News National Coach of the Year (2003) Eddie Robinson Coach of the Year (2004) | |
| 23 | | Kyle Whittingham | 2005–2025 | 265 | 177 | 88 | 0 | .668 | 109 | 70 | 0 | .609 | 11 (Note: Kyle Whittingham and Urban Meyer were listed as "Co-head Coaches" for the 2005 Fiesta Bowl; both coaches are credited with the win in official NCAA records.) | 6 | 0 | .647 | 3 | Paul "Bear" Bryant Award (2008) AFCA National Coach of the Year Award (2008) | |
| 24 | | Morgan Scalley | 2026–Present | 1 | 1 | 0 | 0 | 1.000 | 0 | 0 | 0 | – | 1 | 0 | 0 | 1.000 | — | — | — |
