= List of Utah Utes football seasons =

The Utah Utes football program is a college football team that represents the University of Utah. The Utes have completed 124 seasons and played in 21 certified bowl games. In 1910, Utah joined the Rocky Mountain Athletic Conference (RMAC), the program's first conference affiliation. The Utes won eight conference championships, including six consecutive titles from 1928 to 1933. In 1938 the Utah, along with six other RMAC schools left the conference to form the Mountain States Conference, more commonly known as the Big Seven. After the Colorado Buffaloes withdrew from the Big Seven, the conference was known as the Skyline Conference. The Utes won ten conference championships while in the conference. In 1962, Utah became a charter member of the Western Athletic Conference (WAC). When the charter members of the WAC left at the end of the 1998 season, Utah became a charter member of the Mountain West Conference (MWC) winning four conference titles. In 2010, the Utes withdrew from the MWC and along with former conference rival Colorado, became the 11th and 12th members of the Pac-12 Conference (Pac-12) in the newly formed South Division. Utah and Colorado again moved conferences together in 2024, this time leaving the Pac-12 for the Big 12 Conference.

== Seasons ==
Year	Coach	Overall	Conference	Standing	Bowl/playoffs	Coaches^{#}	AP^{°}
Independent (1892)
1892	Unknown	0–1					
1893	No team						
Robert Harkness (Independent) (1894)
1894	Robert Harkness	1–2					
Walter Shoup (Independent) (1895)
1895	Walter Shoup	0–1					
C. B. Ferris (Independent) (1896)
1896	C. B. Ferris	3–2					
Byron Cummings (Independent) (1897)
1897	Byron Cummings	1–5					
Benjamin Wilson (Independent) (1898)
1898	Benjamin Wilson	2–1					
Charles Gatehouse (Independent) (1899)
1899	Charles Gatehouse	2–1					
Harvey Holmes (Independent) (1900–1903)
1900	Harvey Holmes	2–1					
1901	Harvey Holmes	3–1					
1902	Harvey Holmes	5–2–1					
1903	Harvey Holmes	3–4					
Joe Maddock (Independent) (1904–1909)
1904	Joe Maddock	7–1					
1905	Joe Maddock	6–2					
1906	Joe Maddock	4–1					
1907	Joe Maddock	4–2					
1908	Joe Maddock	3–2–1					
1909	Joe Maddock	4–1					
Fred Bennion (Rocky Mountain Athletic Conference) (1910–1913)
1910	Fred Bennion	4–2	2–2	4th			
1911	Fred Bennion	5–1–1	3–1–1	T–2nd			
1912	Fred Bennion	5–1–1	4–1	2nd			
1913	Fred Bennion	2–4–1	1–2	5th			
Nelson Norgren (Rocky Mountain Athletic Conference) (1914–1917)
1914	Nelson Norgren	3–3	2–3	5th			
1915	Nelson Norgren	5–2	4–2	T–2nd			
1916	Nelson Norgren	3–2	2–2	5th			
1917	Nelson Norgren	2–4	2–3	6th			
1918	No team						
Thomas M. Fitzpatrick (Rocky Mountain Athletic Conference) (1919–1924)
1919	Thomas M. Fitzpatrick	5–2	4–1	2nd			
1920	Thomas Fitzpatrick	1–5–1	1–2–1	5th			
1921	Thomas Fitzpatrick	3–2–1	2–1–1	3rd			
1922	Thomas Fitzpatrick	7–1	5–0	1st			
1923	Thomas Fitzpatrick	4–3	2–3	6th			
1924	Thomas Fitzpatrick	3–4–1	2–2–1	7th			
Ike Armstrong (Rocky Mountain Athletic Conference) (1925–1937)
1925	Ike Armstrong	6–2	5–1	T–2nd			
1926	Ike Armstrong	7–0	5–0	1st			
1927	Ike Armstrong	3–3–1	3–1–1	T–3rd			
1928	Ike Armstrong	5–0–2	4–0–1	1st			
1929	Ike Armstrong	7–0	6–0	1st			
1930	Ike Armstrong	8–0	7–0	1st			
1931	Ike Armstrong	7–2	6–0	1st			
1932	Ike Armstrong	6–1–1	6–0	1st			
1933	Ike Armstrong	5–3	5–1	T–1st			
1934	Ike Armstrong	5–3	4–2	5th			
1935	Ike Armstrong	4–3–1	4–1–1	3rd			
1936	Ike Armstrong	6–3	5–2	3rd			
1937	Ike Armstrong	5–3	5–2	T–3rd			
Ike Armstrong (Skyline Conference) (1938–1949)
1938	Ike Armstrong	7–1–2	4–0–2	1st	W Sun		
1939	Ike Armstrong	6–1–2	4–1–1	2nd			
1940	Ike Armstrong	7–2	5–1	1st			
1941	Ike Armstrong	6–0–2	4–0–2	1st			
1942	Ike Armstrong	6–3	5–1	T–1st			
1943	Ike Armstrong	0–7	0–2	2nd			
1944	Ike Armstrong	5–2–1	1–2–1	3rd			
1945	Ike Armstrong	4–4	3–2	3rd			
1946	Ike Armstrong	8–3	4–2	3rd	L Pineapple (Note: The NCAA did not certify the Pineapple Bowl as a bowl game; the game counts as a regular season game in official NCAA statistics.)		
1947	Ike Armstrong	8–1–1	6–0	1st			
1948	Ike Armstrong	8–1–1	5–0	1st			
1949	Ike Armstrong	2–7–1	2–3	4th			
Jack Curtice (Skyline Conference) (1950–1957)
1950	Jack Curtice	3–4–3	1–2–2	4th			
1951	Jack Curtice	7–4	4–1	1st			
1952	Jack Curtice	6–3–1	5–0	1st			
1953	Jack Curtice	8–2	5–0	1st			
1954	Jack Curtice	4–7	3–3	T–4th			
1955	Jack Curtice	6–3	4–1	2nd			
1956	Jack Curtice	5–5	5–1	2nd			
1957	Jack Curtice	6–4	5–1	1st			
Ray Nagel (Skyline Conference) (1957–1961)
1958	Ray Nagel	4–7	3–3	5th			
1959	Ray Nagel	5–5	3–2	4th			
1960	Ray Nagel	7–3	5–1	3rd			
1961	Ray Nagel	6–4	3–3	T–3rd			
Ray Nagel (Western Athletic Conference) (1962–1965)
1962	Ray Nagel	4–5–1	1–2–1	6th			
1963	Ray Nagel	4–6	2–2	T–3rd			
1964	Ray Nagel	9–2	3–1	T–1st	W Liberty	14	
1965	Ray Nagel	3–7	1–3	5th			
Mike Giddings (Western Athletic Conference) (1966–1967)
1966	Mike Giddings	5–5	3–2	T–2nd			
1967	Mike Giddings	4–7	2–3	4th			
Bill Meek (Western Athletic Conference) (1968–1973)
1968	Bill Meek	3–7	2–3	5th			
1969	Bill Meek	8–2	5–1	2nd			
1970	Bill Meek	6–4	4–2	3rd			
1971	Bill Meek	3–8	3–4	T–4th			
1972	Bill Meek	6–5	5–2	T–2nd			
1973	Bill Meek	7–5	4–2	3rd			
Tom Lovat (Western Athletic Conference) (1974–1976)
1974	Tom Lovat	1–10	1–5	7th			
1975	Tom Lovat	1–10	1–4	6th			
1976	Tom Lovat	3–8	3–3	4th			
Wayne Howard (Western Athletic Conference) (1977–1981)
1977	Wayne Howard	3–8	2–5	7th			
1978	Wayne Howard	8–3	4–3	2nd			
1979	Wayne Howard	6–6	5–2	2nd			
1980	Wayne Howard	5–5–1	2–3–1	7th			
1981	Wayne Howard	8–2–1	4–1–1	4th			
Chuck Stobart (Western Athletic Conference) (1982–1984)
1982	Chuck Stobart	5–6	2–4	7th			
1983	Chuck Stobart	5–6	4–4	5th			
1984	Chuck Stobart	6–5–1	4–3–1	4th			
Jim Fassel (Western Athletic Conference) (1985–1989)
1985	Jim Fassel	8–4	5–3	3rd			
1986	Jim Fassel	2–9	1–7	9th			
1987	Jim Fassel	5–7	2–6	7th			
1988	Jim Fassel	6–5	4–4	5th			
1989	Jim Fassel	4–8	2–6	7th			
Ron McBride (Western Athletic Conference) (1990–1998)
1990	Ron McBride	4–7	2–7	7th			
1991	Ron McBride	7–5	4–4	4th			
1992	Ron McBride	6–6	4–4	T–5th	L Copper		
1993	Ron McBride	7–6	5–3	4th	L Freedom		
1994	Ron McBride	10–2	6–2	T–2nd	W Freedom	8	10
1995	Ron McBride	7–4	6–2	T–1st			
1996	Ron McBride	8–4	6–2	T–2nd (Mountain)	L Copper		
1997	Ron McBride	6–5	6–2	T–2nd (Mountain)			
1998	Ron McBride	7–4	5–3	T–3rd (Pacific)			
Ron McBride (Mountain West Conference) (1999–2002)
1999	Ron McBride	9–3	5–2	T–1st	W Las Vegas		
2000	Ron McBride	4–7	3–4	T–5th			
2001	Ron McBride	8–4	4–3	T–3rd	W Las Vegas		
2002	Ron McBride	5–6	3–4	T–5th			
Urban Meyer (Mountain West Conference) (2003–2004)
2003	Urban Meyer	10–2	6–1	1st	W Liberty	21	21
2004	Urban Meyer (Note: Urban Meyer officially accepted the head coaching job at Florida before the Fiesta Bowl. Kyle Whittingham and Meyer acted as co-head coaches of the 2005 Fiesta Bowl; Utah and the NCAA credit the Fiesta Bowl to both Meyer and Whittingham.)	12–0	7–0	1st	W Fiesta^{†}	5	4
Kyle Whittingham (Mountain West Conference) (2005–2010)
2005	Kyle Whittingham	7–5	4–4	T–4th	W Emerald		
2006	Kyle Whittingham	8–5	5–3	T–3rd	W Armed Forces		
2007	Kyle Whittingham	9–4	5–3	T–3rd	W Poinsettia		
2008	Kyle Whittingham	13–0	8–0	1st	W Sugar^{†}	4	2
2009	Kyle Whittingham	10–3	6–2	3rd	W Poinsettia	18	18
2010	Kyle Whittingham	10–3	7–1	2nd	L Las Vegas	23	
Kyle Whittingham (Pac-12 Conference) (2011–2023)
2011	Kyle Whittingham	8–5	4–5	T–2nd (South)	W Sun		
2012	Kyle Whittingham	5–7	3–6	5th (South)			
2013	Kyle Whittingham	5–7	2–7	5th (South)			
2014	Kyle Whittingham	9–4	5–4	5th (South)	W Las Vegas	20	21
2015	Kyle Whittingham	10–3	6–3	T–1st (South)	W Las Vegas	16	17
2016	Kyle Whittingham	9–4	5–4	3rd (South)	W Foster Farms	21	23
2017	Kyle Whittingham	7–6	3–6	5th (South)	W Heart of Dallas		
2018	Kyle Whittingham	9–5	6–3	1st (South)	L Holiday		
2019	Kyle Whittingham	11–3	8–1	1st (South)	L Alamo	16	16
2020	Kyle Whittingham	3–2	3–2	3rd (South)			
2021	Kyle Whittingham	10–4	8–1	1st (South)	L Rose^{†}	12	12
2022	Kyle Whittingham	10–4	7–2	1st (South)	L Rose^{†}	11	10
2023	Kyle Whittingham	8–5	5–4	T–4th	L Las Vegas		
Kyle Whittingham (Big 12 Conference) (2024–2025)
2024	Kyle Whittingham	5–7	2–7	T–13th			
2025	Kyle Whittingham	11–2	7–2	3rd	W Las Vegas	14	14
Total:		729–451–31					
National championship Conference title Conference division title or championship game berth
^{†}Indicates Bowl Coalition, Bowl Alliance, BCS, or CFP / New Years' Six bowl.; ^{#}Rankings from final Coaches Poll.; ^{°}Rankings from final AP Poll.; 1947 Pineapple Bowl was not sanctioned as a bowl game.
