= List of Washington State Cougars head football coaches =

The Washington State Cougars college football team represents the Washington State University in the North Division of the Pac-12 Conference (Pac-12). The Cougars compete as part of the National Collegiate Athletic Association (NCAA) Division I Football Bowl Subdivision. The program has had 37 head coaches and two interim head coaches since it began play during the 1894 season. Since December 2025, Kirby Moore has served as Washington State's head coach.

== Key ==
Key to symbols in coaches list
General		Overall		Conference		Postseason (Note: Although the first Rose Bowl Game was played in 1902, it has been continuously played since the 1916 game, and is recognized as the oldest bowl game by the NCAA. "—" indicates any season prior to 1916 when postseason games were not played.)	
No.	Order of coaches (Note: A running total of the number of head coaches, with coaches who served separate tenures being counted only once. Interim head coaches are represented with "Int" and are not counted in the running total. "—" indicates the team played but either without a coach or no coach is on record. "X" indicates an interim year without play.)	GC	Games coached	CW	Conference wins	PW	Postseason wins
DC	Division championships	OW	Overall wins	CL	Conference losses	PL	Postseason losses
CC	Conference championships	OL	Overall losses	CT	Conference ties	PT	Postseason ties
NC	National championships	OT	Overall ties (Note: Overtime rules in college football were introduced in 1996, making ties impossible in the period since.)	C%	Conference winning percentage		
†	Elected to the College Football Hall of Fame	O%	Overall winning percentage (Note: When computing the win–loss percentage, a tie counts as half a win and half a loss.)				

== Coaches ==
List of head football coaches showing season(s) coached, overall records, conference records, postseason records, championships and selected awards (Note: Statistics correct as of the end of the 2025 NCAA Division I FBS football season.)
No.	Name	Season(s) (Note: Washington State did not field teams in 1943 and 1944 due to World War II.)	GC	OW	OL	OT	O%	CW	CL	CT	C%	PW	PL	PT	CC	NC	Awards
1	William Goodyear	1894	2	1	1	0	0.500	—	—	—	—	—	—	—	—	—	—
2	Fred Waite	1895	2	2	0	0	1.000	—	—	—	—	—	—	—	—	—	—
3	David A. Brodie	1896	3	2	0	1	0.833	—	—	—	—	—	—	—	—	—	—
4	Robert Gailey	1897	2	2	0	0	1.000	—	—	—	—	—	—	—	—	—	—
5	Frank Shively	1898–1899	3	1	1	1	0.500	—	—	—	—	—	—	—	—	—	—
6; 8	William L. Allen	1900; 1902	10	6	3	1	0.650	—	—	—	—	—	—	—	—	—	—
7	William Namack	1901	5	4	1	0	0.800	—	—	—	—	—	—	—	—	—	—
9	James N. Ashmore	1903	8	3	3	1	0.500	—	—	—	—	—	—	—	—	—	—
10	Everett Sweeley	1904–1905	12	6	6	0	0.500	—	—	—	—	—	—	—	—	—	—
11; 15	John R. Bender	1906–1907; 1912–1914	33	21	12	0	0.636	5	9	0	0.357	—	—	—	—	—	—
12	Walter Rheinschild	1908	6	4	0	2	0.833	4	0	2	0.667	—	—	—	—	—	—
13	Willis Kienholz	1909	5	4	1	0	0.800	2	0	0	0.800	—	—	—	1	—	—
14	Oscar Osthoff	1910–1911	11	5	6	0	0.455	3	6	0	0.333	—	—	—	—	—	—
16	William Henry Dietz^{†}	1915–1917	20	17	2	1	0.875	11	2	0	0.846	1	0	0	3	—	—
17	Emory Alvord	1918	2	1	1	0	0.500	—	—	—	—	—	—	—	—	—	—
18	Gus Welch^{†}	1919–1922	27	16	10	1	0.611	11	9	1	0.548	0	0	0	1	—	—
19	Albert Exendine^{†}	1923–1925	23	6	13	4	0.348	5	11	4	0.350	0	0	0	0	—	—
20	Babe Hollingbery^{†}	1926–1942	160	93	53	14	0.625	64	42	10	0.595	0	1	0	1	—	—
21	Phil Sarboe	1945–1949	46	17	26	3	0.402	15	21	3	0.423	0	0	0	0	—	—
22	Forest Evashevski^{†}	1950–1951	19	11	6	2	0.632	6	6	2	0.500	0	0	0	0	—	—
23	Al Kircher	1952–1955	40	13	25	2	0.350	10	17	1	0.375	0	0	0	0	—	—
24	Jim Sutherland	1956–1963	80	37	39	4	0.488	15	12	1	0.554	0	0	0	0	—	—
25	Bert Clark	1964–1967	40	15	24	1	0.388	5	11	1	0.324	0	0	0	0	—	—
26	Jim Sweeney	1968–1975	86	26	59	1	0.308	12	41	1	0.231	0	0	0	0	—	—
27	Jackie Sherrill	1976	11	3	8	0	0.273	2	5	0	0.286	0	0	0	0	—	—
28	Warren Powers	1977	11	7	4	0	0.636	3	4	0	0.429	0	0	0	0	—	—
29	Jim Walden	1978–1986	100	44	52	4	0.460	28	39	3	0.421	0	1	0	0	—	—
30	Dennis Erickson^{†}	1987–1988	23	12	10	1	0.543	6	8	1	0.433	1	0	0	0	—	—
31	Mike Price	1989–2002	160	83	78	0	0.516	49	63	0	0.438	3	2	0	2	—	Bobby Dodd COY (1997); Eddie Robinson COY (1997); Home Depot COY (1997); Sporting News College Football COY (1997)
31	Bill Doba	2003–2007	59	30	29	—	0.508	17	25	—	0.405	1	0	—	0	—	—
32	Paul Wulff	2008–2011	49	9	40	—	0.184	4	32	—	0.111	0	0	—	0	—	—
33	Mike Leach	2012–2019	102	55	47	—	0.539	36	36	—	0.500	2	4	—	0	—	—
34	Nick Rolovich	2020–2021	11	5	6	—	0.455	4	5	—	0.444	0	0	—	0	—	—
35	Jake Dickert	2021–2024	43	23	20	—	0.535	9	14	—	0.391	0	2	—	0	—	—
Int.	Pete Kaligis (Note: Pete Kaligis was named interim head coach for the 2024 Holiday Bowl, following the resignation of Jake Dickert as head coach.)	2024	1	0	1	—	.000	0	0	—	–	0	1	—	0	—	—
36	Jimmy Rogers	2025	12	6	6	—	0.500	1	1	—	0.500	0	0	—	0	—	—
Int.	Jesse Bobbit	2025	1	1	0	—	1.000	0	0	—	–	1	0	—	0	—	—
37	Kirby Moore	2026-N/A	0	0	0	—	–	0	0	—	–	0	0	—	0	—	—
