= List of Oregon Ducks head football coaches =

List of head football coaches of the Oregon Ducks

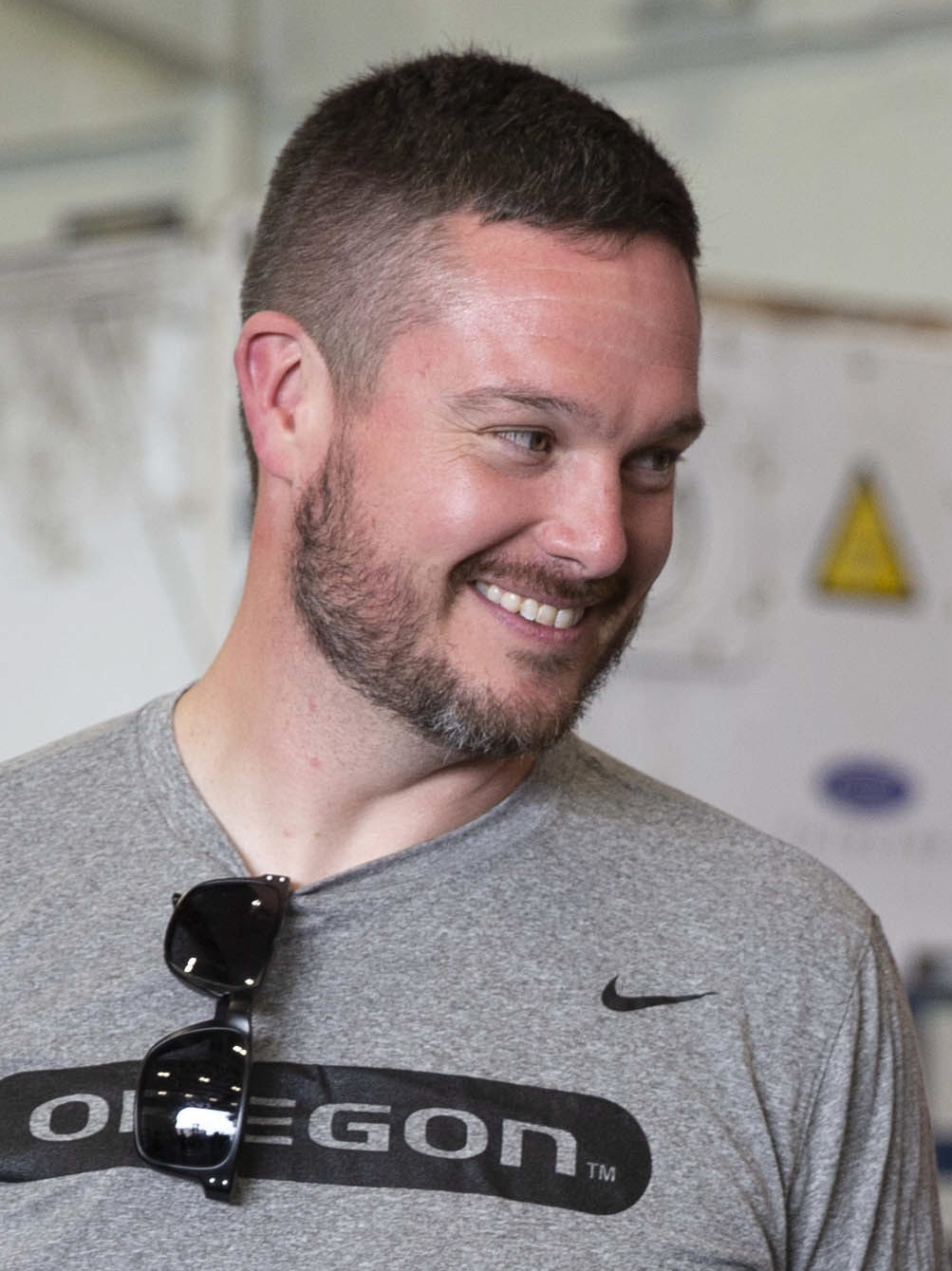
Dan Lanning has served as head coach of the Ducks since December 2021.

The Oregon Ducks football program is a college football team representing the University of Oregon that is a member of the Big Ten Conference. The team has had 35 head coaches since its founding in 1894. The Ducks have played in more than 1,100 games in 113 seasons. In those seasons, ten coaches have led Oregon to bowl games: Hugo Bezdek, Shy Huntington, Jim Aiken, Len Casanova, Rich Brooks, Mike Bellotti, Chip Kelly, Mark Helfrich, Mario Cristobal, and Dan Lanning. Conference championships have been won by Huntington, Prink Callison, Jim Aiken, Casanova, Brooks, Bellotti, Kelly, Lanning and Mark Helfrich. Brooks is the all-time leader in games coached; Mike Bellotti holds the record for most victories, while Chip Kelly is the leader in win percentage for coaches with more than one season of service.

Of the 35 Oregon head coaches, three, Bellotti, Bezdek, and Casanova, are in the College Football Hall of Fame as coaches. John McEwan and Clarence Spears are also in the Hall of Fame, but as players at Army and Dartmouth. Brooks and Kelly have each received National Coach of the Year honors from at least one organization. Mark Helfrich (2013–2016), was promoted to head coach in 2013 following Chip Kelly's departure to the Philadelphia Eagles.

Dan Lanning is the current head coach of Oregon, having held the position since 2022.

== Key ==
Key to symbols in coaches list
General		Overall		Conference		Postseason (Note: Although the first Rose Bowl Game was played in 1902, it has been continuously played since the 1916 game, and is recognized as the oldest bowl game by the NCAA. "—" indicates any season prior to 1916 when postseason games were not played.)	
No.	Order of coaches (Note: A running total of the number of head coaches, with coaches who served separate tenures being counted only once. Interim head coaches are represented with "Int" and are not counted in the running total. "—" indicates the team played but either without a coach or no coach is on record. "X" indicates an interim year without play.)	GC	Games coached	CW	Conference wins	PW	Postseason wins
DC	Division championships	OW	Overall wins	CL	Conference losses	PL	Postseason losses
CC	Conference championships	OL	Overall losses	CT	Conference ties	PT	Postseason ties
NC	National championships	OT	Overall ties (Note: Overtime rules in college football were introduced in 1996, making ties impossible in the period since.)	C%	Conference winning percentage		
†	Elected to the College Football Hall of Fame	O%	Overall winning percentage (Note: When computing the win–loss percentage, a tie counts as half a win and half a loss.)				

== Coaches ==
List of head football coaches showing season(s) coached, overall records, conference records, postseason records, championships and selected awards (Note: Statistics correct as of the end of the 2025 NCAA Division I FBS football season.)
No.	Name	Season(s) (Note: Oregon did not field teams in 1943 and 1944 due to World War II.)	GC	OW	OL	OT	O%	CW	CL	CT	C%	PW	PL	PT	CC	NC	Awards
1	Cal Young	1894	1	1	0	0	1.000	—	—	—	—	—	—	—	—	—	—
2	J. A. Church	1894	3	0	2	1	0.167	—	—	—	—	—	—	—	—	—	—
3	Percy Benson	1895	4	4	0	0	1.000	4	0	0	1.000	—	—	—	1	—	—
4	J. F. Frick	1896	3	2	1	0	0.667	—	—	—	—	—	—	—	—	—	—
5	Joe Smith	1897	2	1	1	0	0.500	—	—	—	—	—	—	—	—	—	—
6	Frank W. Simpson	1898–1899	10	6	3	1	0.650	—	—	—	—	—	—	—	—	—	—
7	Lawrence Kaarsberg	1900	7	3	3	1	0.500	—	—	—	—	—	—	—	—	—	—
8; 10	Warren W. Smith	1901; 1903	15	7	6	2	0.533	—	—	—	—	—	—	—	—	—	—
9	Marion Dolph	1902	7	3	1	3	0.643	—	—	—	—	—	—	—	—	—	—
11; 21	Richard Shore Smith	1904; 1925	15	6	8	1	0.433	1	5	0	0.167	—	—	—	0	—	—
12	Bruce Shorts	1905	8	4	2	2	0.625	—	—	—	—	—	—	—	—	—	—
13; 18	Hugo Bezdek^{†}	1906; 1913–1917	43	29	10	4	0.721	11	6	1	0.639	1	0	0	0	—	—
14	Gordon B. Frost	1907	6	5	1	0	0.833	—	—	—	—	—	—	—	—	—	—
15	Robert Forbes	1908–1909	12	8	4	0	0.667	3	3	0	0.500	—	—	—	—	—	—
16	Bill Warner^{†}	1910–1911	10	7	3	0	0.700	4	1	0	0.800	—	—	—	—	—	—
17	Louis Pinkham	1912	7	3	4	0	0.429	2	3	0	0.400	—	—	—	0	—	—
19	Charles A. Huntington	1918–1923	44	26	12	6	0.659	16	8	6	0.633	0	1	0	1	—	—
20	Joe Maddock	1924	9	4	3	2	0.556	4	2	2	0.625	0	0	0	0	—	—
22	John McEwan^{†}	1926–1929	35	20	13	2	0.600	9	11	1	0.452	0	0	0	0	—	—
23	Clarence Spears^{†}	1930–1931	19	13	4	2	0.737	6	2	1	0.722	0	0	0	0	—	—
24	Prink Callison	1932–1937	58	33	23	2	0.586	16	17	2	0.486	0	0	0	1	—	—
25; 27	Tex Oliver	1938–1941; 1945–1946	54	23	28	3	0.454	20	25	3	0.448	0	0	0	0	—	—
26	John A. Warren	1942	8	2	6	0	0.250	2	5	0	0.286	0	0	0	0	—	—
28	Jim Aiken	1947–1950	41	21	20	0	0.512	14	13	0	0.519	0	1	0	1	—	—
29	Len Casanova^{†}	1951–1966	163	82	73	8	0.528	29	41	4	0.419	1	2	0	1	—	—
30	Jerry Frei	1967–1971	53	22	29	2	0.434	11	19	0	0.367	0	0	0	0	—	—
31	Dick Enright	1972–1973	22	6	16	0	0.273	4	10	0	0.286	0	0	0	0	—	—
32	Don Read	1974–1976	33	9	24	0	0.273	3	18	0	0.143	0	0	0	0	—	—
33	Rich Brooks	1977–1994	204	91	109	4	0.456	56	79	2	0.416	1	3	0	1	—	Eddie Robinson COY (1994); Home Depot COY (1994); Sporting News College Football COY (1994); Paul "Bear" Bryant Award (1994)
34	Mike Bellotti^{†}	1995–2008	171	116	55	—	0.678	72	43	—	0.629	6	6	—	2	—	—
35	Chip Kelly	2009–2012	53	46	7	—	0.868	33	3	—	0.917	2	2	—	3	—	AP College Football COY (2010); Eddie Robinson COY (2010); Walter Camp COY (2010); Sporting News COY (2010); AFCA COY (2010)
36	Mark Helfrich	2013–2016	53	37	16	—	0.698	24	12	—	0.667	2	2	—	1	—	—
37	Willie Taggart	2017	12	7	5	—	0.583	4	5	—	0.444	0	0	—	0	—	—
38	Mario Cristobal	2017–2021	48	35	13	—	0.729	23	9	—	0.719	2	2	—	2	—	—
Int.	Bryan McClendon	2021	1	0	1	—	.000	0	0	—	–	0	1	—	0	—	—
39	Dan Lanning	2022–present	56	48	8	—	0.857	32	4	—	0.889	4	2	—	1	—	—

== Gallery ==
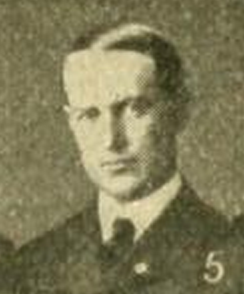
Frank W. Simpson

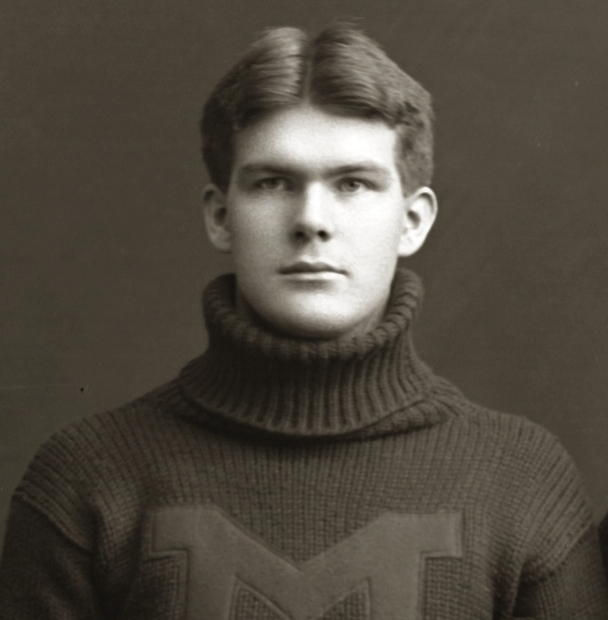
Bruce Shorts

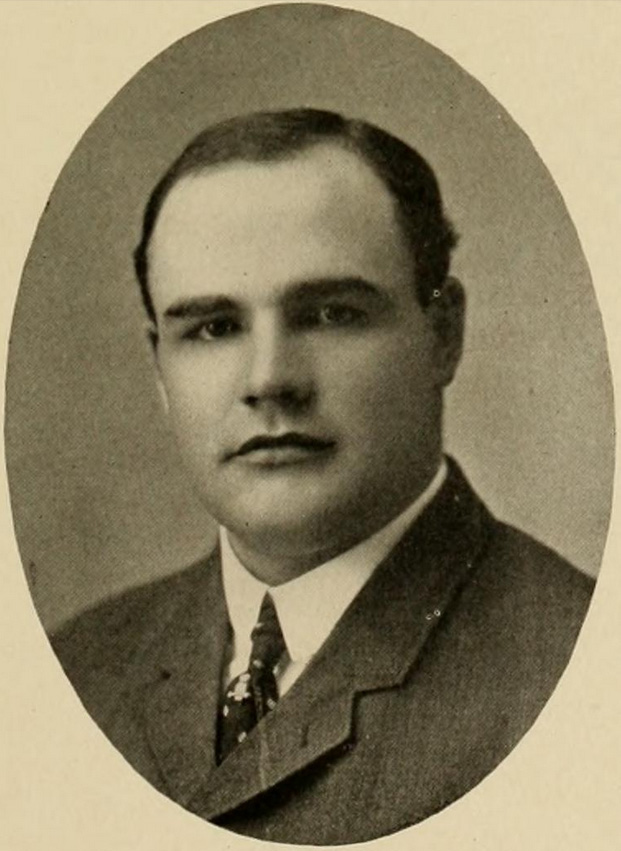
Bill Warner

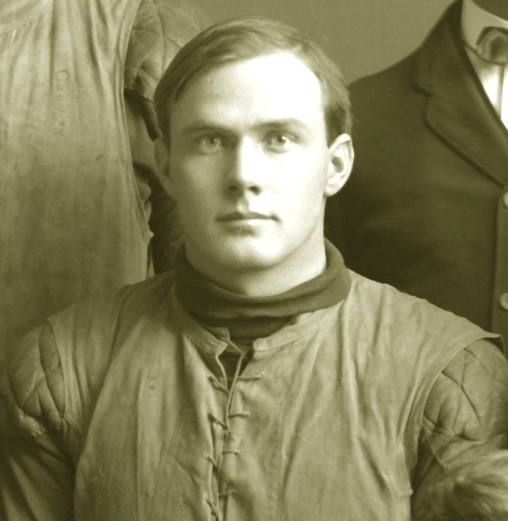
Joe Maddock

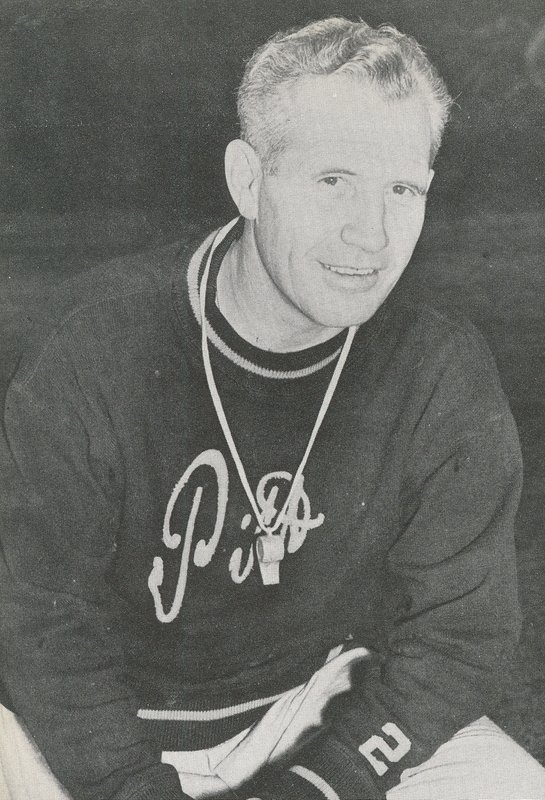
Len Casanova

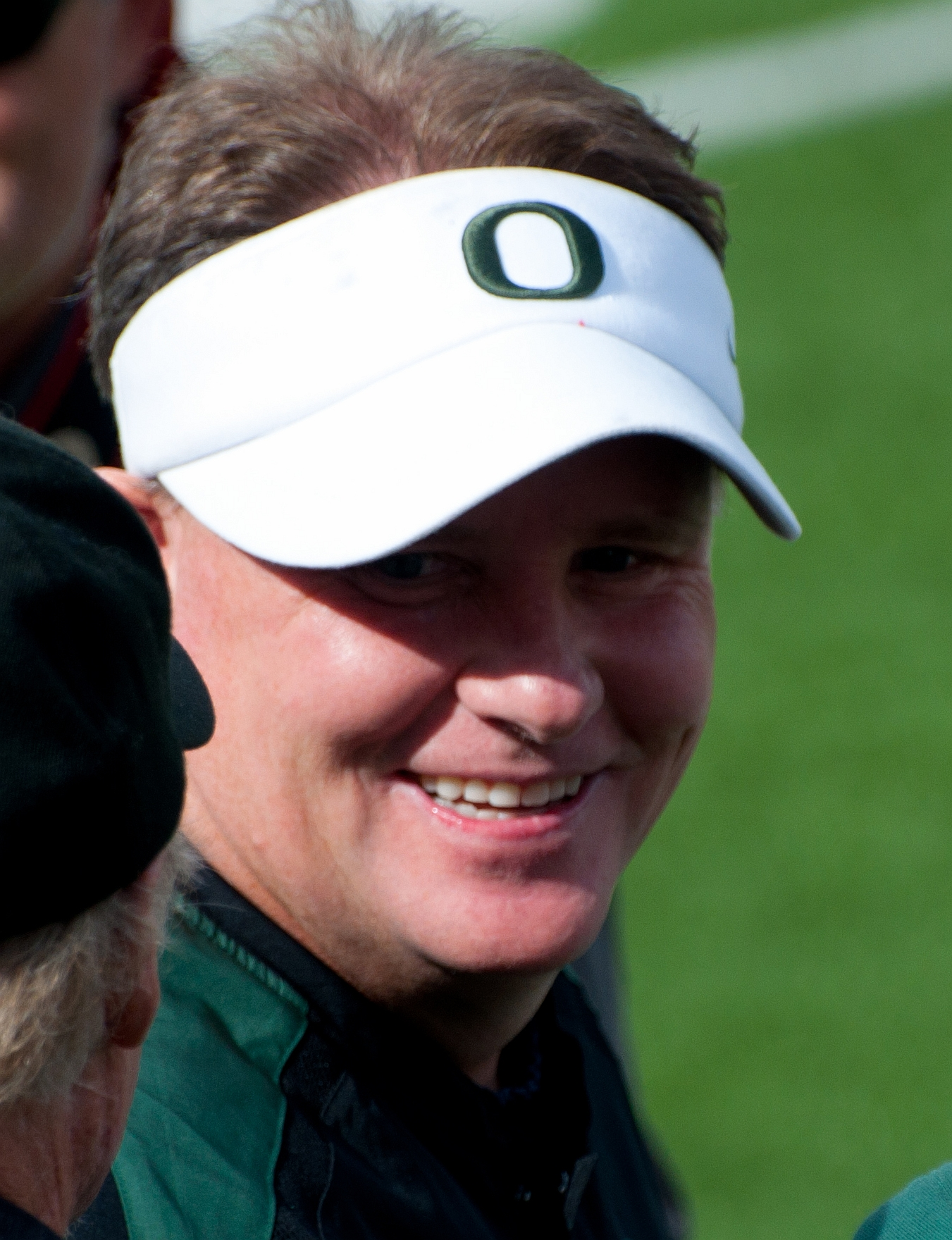
Chip Kelly

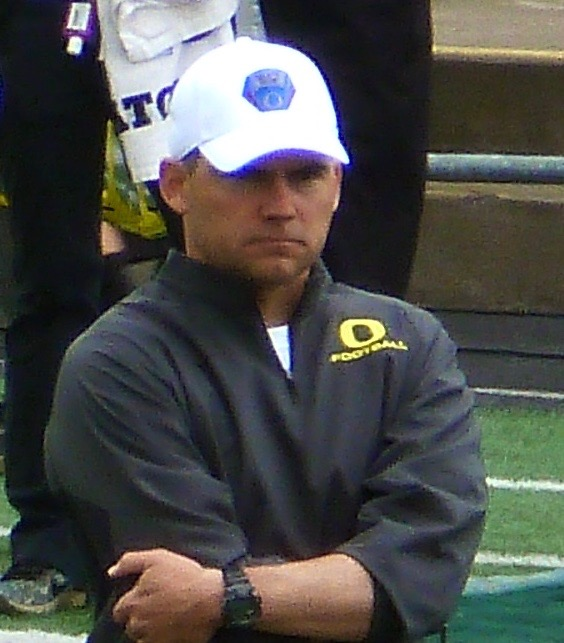
Mark Helfrich

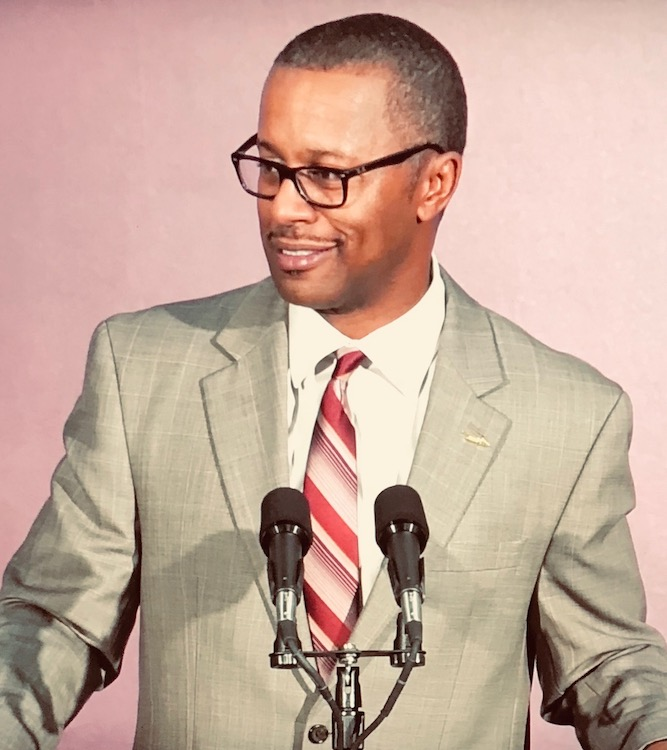
Willie Taggart
