= Miles F. Hatch =

American politician (1847-1919)

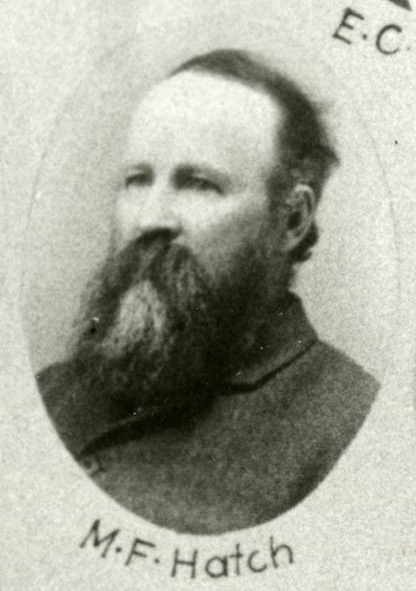
- Hatch in 1895

Member of the Washington House of Representatives for the 38th district
- In office 1895–1897

Personal details
- Born: April 1847 McHenry County, Illinois, United States
- Died: January 21, 1919 (aged 71) Alderton, Washington, United States
- Party: Republican

Miles F. Hatch (April 1847 – January 21, 1919) was an American politician in the state of Washington. He served in the Washington House of Representatives from 1895 to 1897.

Hatch founded Vashon College in Burton, Washington in 1892.
