= Fred Waite (disambiguation) =

Fred Waite (1853–1895) was an American cowboy.

Fred Waite may also refer to:

- Fred Waite (American football), (1875–1905), American college football coach and cyclist
- Fred Waite (politician) (1885–1952), New Zealand soldier and later politician of the Reform Party
