= Western Washington Inter-Collegiate Athletic Association =

College sports conference, 1891–c. 1899

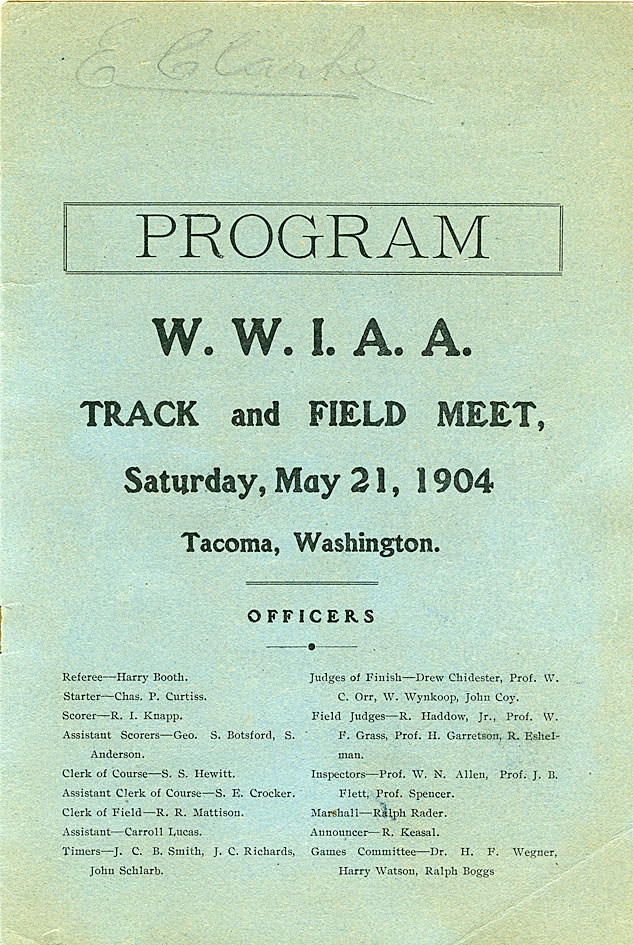
- Program for the 1904 WWIAA Track and Field meet in Tacoma
- Founded: April 4, 1891
- Folded: c. 1899
- Region: Western Washington

The Western Washington Inter-Collegiate Athletic Association (WWIAA) was an early athletic conference governing competition between member institutions in Western Washington on the Puget Sound.

== Member institutions ==
| Member institution | Date joined | Notes |
|---|---|---|
| Puget Sound University | April 1891 | |
| Whitworth College | April 1891 | |
| Washington College | April 1891 | |
| University of Washington | April 1891 | |
| Tacoma Academy | April 1891 | |
| Seattle University | March 1893 | |
| Vashon College | March 1893 | |
| Olympia Collegiate Institute | March 1893 | |
