= 1895 Wyoming Cowboys football team =

American college football season

1895 Wyoming Cowboys football
- Conference: Independent
- Record: 1–0
- Head coach: Justus F. Soule (2nd season)
- Captain: Herbert J. Brees

1895 Far West college football independents records
	Conf.			Overall
Team	W	L	T	W		L		T
Occidental		–		5	–	0	–	0
New Mexico A&M		–		2	–	0	–	0
Washington Agricultural		–		2	–	0	–	0
Gonzaga		–		1	–	0	–	0
Wyoming		–		1	–	0	–	0
Stanford		–		4	–	0	–	1
Washington		–		4	–	0	–	1
California		–		3	–	1	–	1
Pacific (CA)		–		0	–	0	–	1
Saint Mary's		–		1	–	1	–	0
San Jose Normal		–		0	–	0	–	1
USC		–		0	–	1	–	1
Idaho		–		0	–	1	–	0
Utah		–		0	–	1	–	0

The 1895 Wyoming Cowboys football team represented the University of Wyoming as an independent during the 1895 college football season. In its second season under head coach Justus F. Soule, a professor of Latin and Greek, the team compiled a perfect 1–0 record. In the program's first intercollegiate football game, the team defeated Colorado State Normal from Greeley, Colorado, by a 34–0 score.

For the second of three consecutive years, Herbert J. Brees was the team captain. Brees was a native of Laramie who went on to a career in the United States Army. He retired from the Army in 1941 with the rank of lieutenant general.

== Schedule ==
Date	Opponent	Site	Result
November 29	Colorado State Normal	Laramie, WY	W 16–6
