= 1895 Washington Agricultural football team =

American college football season

1895 Washington Agricultural football
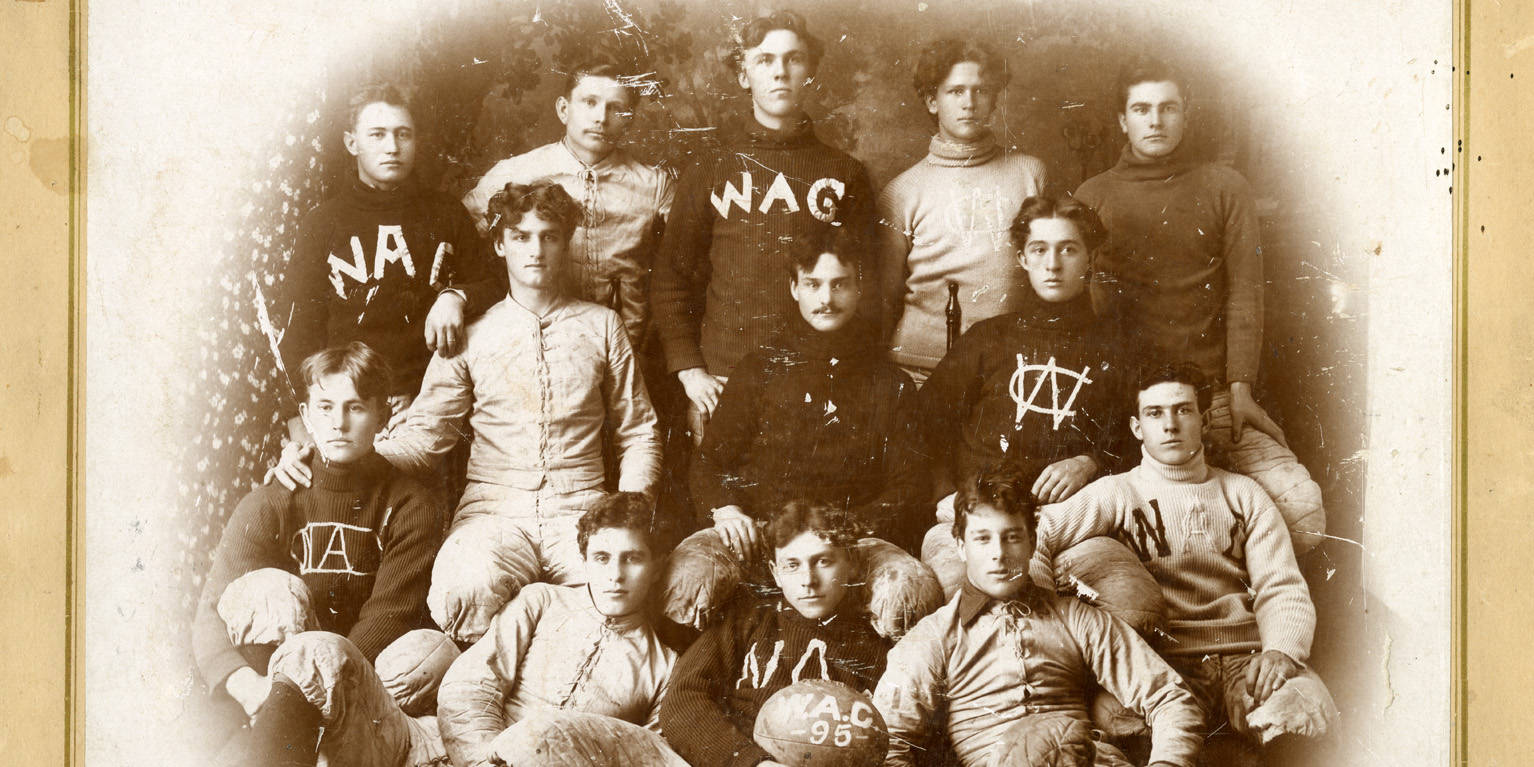
- Conference: Independent
- Record: 2–0
- Head coach: Fred Waite (1st season)
- Captain: Frank Lowden
- Home stadium: Soldier Field

1895 Far West college football independents records
	Conf.			Overall
Team	W	L	T	W		L		T
Occidental		–		5	–	0	–	0
New Mexico A&M		–		2	–	0	–	0
Washington Agricultural		–		2	–	0	–	0
Gonzaga		–		1	–	0	–	0
Wyoming		–		1	–	0	–	0
Stanford		–		4	–	0	–	1
Washington		–		4	–	0	–	1
California		–		3	–	1	–	1
Pacific (CA)		–		0	–	0	–	1
Saint Mary's		–		1	–	1	–	0
San Jose Normal		–		0	–	0	–	1
USC		–		0	–	1	–	1
Idaho		–		0	–	1	–	0
Utah		–		0	–	1	–	0

The 1895 Washington Agricultural football team was an American football team that represented Washington Agricultural College during the 1895 college football season. The team competed as an independent under head coach Fred Waite and compiled a record of 2–0, its first undefeated season.

== Schedule ==
Date	Opponent	Site	Result	Attendance	Source
November 9	Idaho	Soldier Field; Pullman, WA (rivalry)	W 10–4	500	
November 28	at Spokane Athletic Club	Spokane, WA	W 26–4	1,100	
