= 1895 Occidental football team =

American college football season

1895 Occidental Tigers football

Southern California champion
- Conference: Independent
- Record: 6–0
- Head coach: None
- Captain: Salem W. Goodale

1895 Far West college football independents records
	Conf.			Overall
Team	W	L	T	W		L		T
Occidental		–		5	–	0	–	0
New Mexico A&M		–		2	–	0	–	0
Washington Agricultural		–		2	–	0	–	0
Gonzaga		–		1	–	0	–	0
Wyoming		–		1	–	0	–	0
Stanford		–		4	–	0	–	1
Washington		–		4	–	0	–	1
California		–		3	–	1	–	1
Pacific (CA)		–		0	–	0	–	1
Saint Mary's		–		1	–	1	–	0
San Jose Normal		–		0	–	0	–	1
USC		–		0	–	1	–	1
Idaho		–		0	–	1	–	0
Utah		–		0	–	1	–	0

The 1895 Occidental football team represented Occidental College as an independent during the 1895 college football season. The team compiled a 6–0, including a victory over USC, and outscored opponents by a total of 106 to 6. At the end of the season, the Los Angeles Athletic Club declared Occidental to be the Southern California football champion.

Salem Wales Goodale played at the right halfback position and was the team's captain. Goodale was an Amherst College alumnus. An Occidental professor, Goodale was placed in charge of athletics at Occidental and became known as "the Walter Camp of the West."

Other key players included "Little Lewis" Murray at left end, Pedro Recio at left tackle, Will Salisbury at left guard, V. Place at center, A. L. Randall at right guard, J. Ramsaur at right tackle, Winthrop Blackstone at right end (also team manager), Bradshaw at quarterback, Will Edwards at left halfback, and Will Ramsaur at fullback.

== Schedule ==
Date	Opponent	Site	Result	Source
October 7	Whittier	Occidental gridiron; Los Angeles, CA	W 8–6	
October 12	Throop	Occidental campus; Los Angeles, CA	W 16–0	
October 21	Los Angeles Academy	Occidental campus; Los Angeles, CA	W 34–0	
November 18	USC	Agricultural Park; Los Angeles, CA	W 10–0	
November 2	at Santa Ana	North Main Street athletic park; Santa Ana, CA	W 22–0	
December 16	Pomona	Athletic Park; Los Angeles CA (rivalry)	W 16–0	
