= Vashon College =

Private college in Burton, Washington, US (1892–1910)

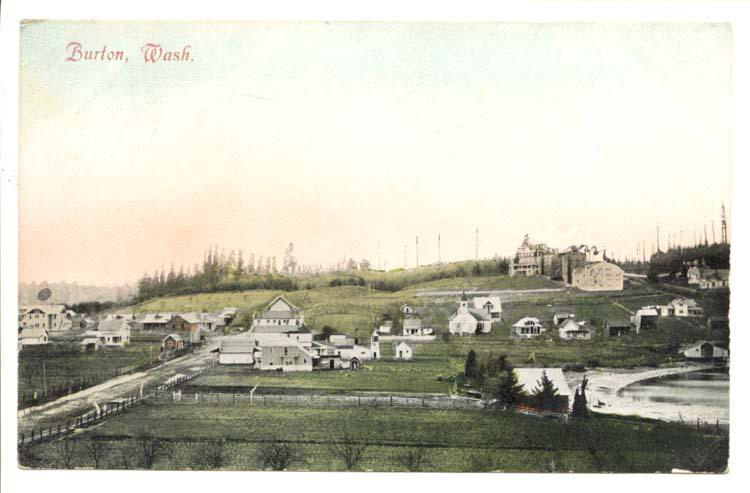
- View of Burton, Washington, with Vashon College buildings visible at the top right.
- Active: October 25, 1892–November 19, 1910 (burned)
- Founder: Miles F. Hatch
- Location: Burton, Washington, United States
- Colors: Crimson and cream

Vashon College was a school in Burton, Washington on Vashon Island in the Puget Sound.

== Athletics ==
Vashon was a member of the Western Washington Inter-Collegiate Athletic Association alongside the University of Washington, Puget Sound University, and Whitworth College. The school played the University of Washington football team twice in 1895 and once in 1901.
