= 1895 San Jose Normal football team =

American college football season

1895 San Jose Normal football
- Conference: Independent
- Record: 0–0–1
- Head coach: James E. Addicott (2nd season)

1895 Far West college football independents records
| | Conf. | | | Overall |
| Team | W | L | T | W | | L | | T |
|---|---|---|---|---|---|---|---|---|
| Occidental | | – | | 5 | – | 0 | – | 0 |
| New Mexico A&M | | – | | 2 | – | 0 | – | 0 |
| Washington Agricultural | | – | | 2 | – | 0 | – | 0 |
| Gonzaga | | – | | 1 | – | 0 | – | 0 |
| Wyoming | | – | | 1 | – | 0 | – | 0 |
| Stanford | | – | | 4 | – | 0 | – | 1 |
| Washington | | – | | 4 | – | 0 | – | 1 |
| California | | – | | 3 | – | 1 | – | 1 |
| Pacific (CA) | | – | | 0 | – | 0 | – | 1 |
| Saint Mary's | | – | | 1 | – | 1 | – | 0 |
| San Jose Normal | | – | | 0 | – | 0 | – | 1 |
| USC | | – | | 0 | – | 1 | – | 1 |
| Idaho | | – | | 0 | – | 1 | – | 0 |
| Utah | | – | | 0 | – | 1 | – | 0 |

The 1895 San Jose Normal football team represented California State Normal School—now known as San Jose State University—as an independent during the 1895 college football season. In the program's third year of play, San Jose Normal achieved its first tie, a 6–6 decision against the Pacific Tigers of the nearby University of the Pacific. This was the first football game for Pacific. The contest was played in late January 1896, but as was done in 1892, their game was counted in the 1895 academic year.

== Schedule ==
| Date | Opponent | Site | Result | Source |
|---|---|---|---|---|
| January 25, 1896 | Pacific (CA) | San Jose, CA (rivalry) | T 6–6 | |
