= 1895 California Golden Bears football team =

American college football season

1895 California Golden Bears football
- Conference: Independent
- Record: 3–1–1
- Head coach: Frank Butterworth (1st season)
- Captain: Eddie Sherman

1895 Far West college football independents records
	Conf.			Overall
Team	W	L	T	W		L		T
Occidental		–		5	–	0	–	0
New Mexico A&M		–		2	–	0	–	0
Washington Agricultural		–		2	–	0	–	0
Gonzaga		–		1	–	0	–	0
Wyoming		–		1	–	0	–	0
Stanford		–		4	–	0	–	1
Washington		–		4	–	0	–	1
California		–		3	–	1	–	1
Pacific (CA)		–		0	–	0	–	1
Saint Mary's		–		1	–	1	–	0
San Jose Normal		–		0	–	0	–	1
USC		–		0	–	1	–	1
Idaho		–		0	–	1	–	0
Utah		–		0	–	1	–	0

The 1895 California Golden Bears football team was an American football team that represented the University of California, Berkeley during the 1895 college football season. The team competed as an independent under head coach Frank Butterworth and compiled a record of 3–1–1.

== Schedule ==
Date	Opponent	Site	Result	Attendance
October 6	Reliance Athletic Club	Berkeley, CA	L 0–4	
October 12	Reliance Athletic Club	Berkeley, CA	W 12–0	
October 26	Reliance Athletic Club	Berkeley, CA	W 8–0	
November 9	vs. Olympic Club	Central Park; San Francisco, CA	W 20–0	
November 28	vs. Stanford	Central Park; San Francisco, CA (rivalry)	T 6–6	10,000
