= 1895 USC Methodists football team =

American college football season

1895 USC Methodists football
- Conference: Independent
- Record: 0–1–1
- Head coach: None
- Captain: Lee Bradley

1895 Far West college football independents records
	Conf.			Overall
Team	W	L	T	W		L		T
Occidental		–		5	–	0	–	0
New Mexico A&M		–		2	–	0	–	0
Washington Agricultural		–		2	–	0	–	0
Gonzaga		–		1	–	0	–	0
Wyoming		–		1	–	0	–	0
Stanford		–		4	–	0	–	1
Washington		–		4	–	0	–	1
California		–		3	–	1	–	1
Pacific (CA)		–		0	–	0	–	1
Saint Mary's		–		1	–	1	–	0
San Jose Normal		–		0	–	0	–	1
USC		–		0	–	1	–	1
Idaho		–		0	–	1	–	0
Utah		–		0	–	1	–	0

The 1895 USC Methodists football team was an American football team that represented the University of Southern California during the 1895 college football season. The team competed as an independent without a head coach, compiling a 0–1–1 record.

== Schedule ==
Date	Opponent	Site	Result	Source
November 18	vs. Occidental	Athletic Park; Los Angeles, CA	L 0–10	
December 7	Throop	Los Angeles, CA	T 4–4	
