= 1895 Washington football team =

American college football season

1895 Washington football
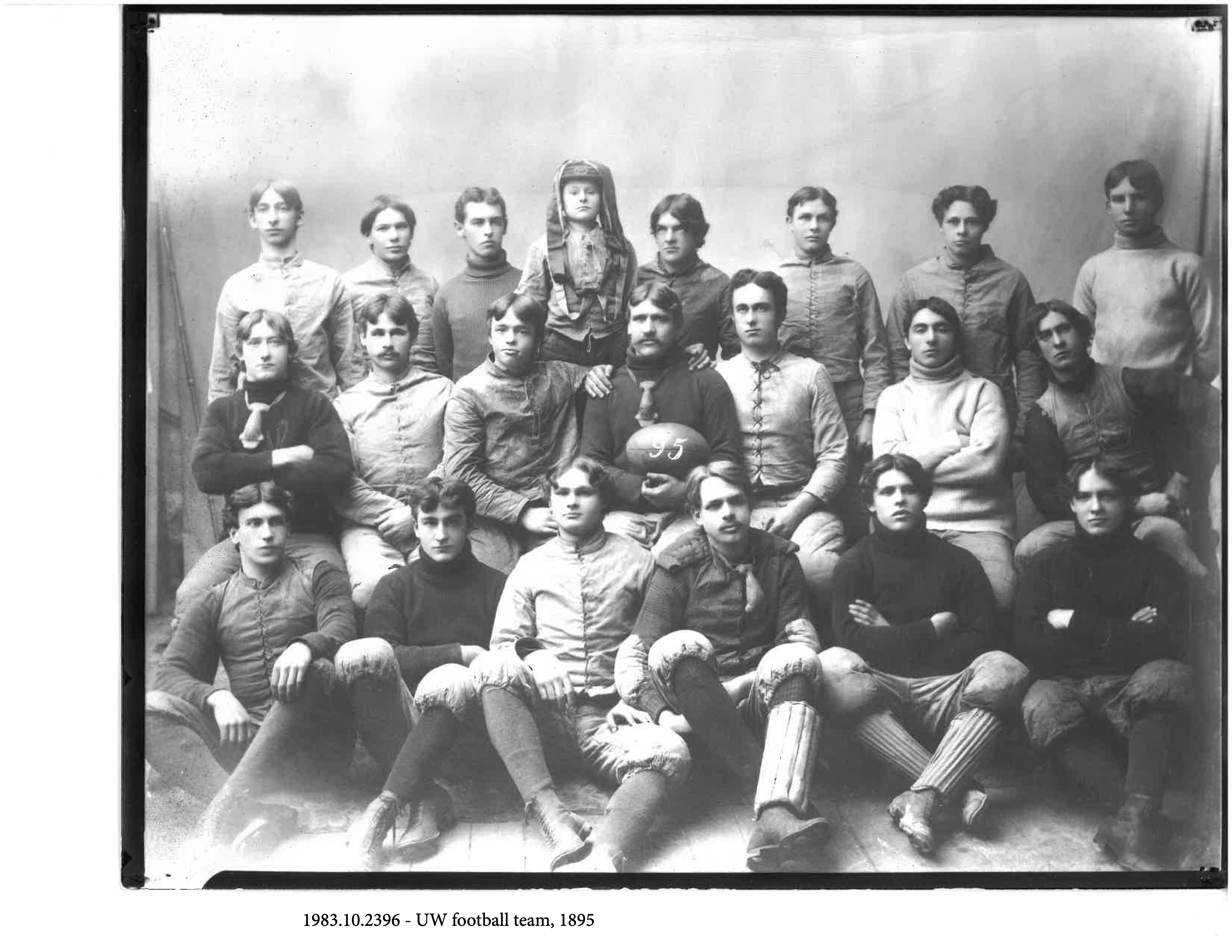
- Conference: Independent
- Record: 4–0–1
- Head coach: Ralph Nichols (1st season)
- Captain: Martin Harrias
- Home stadium: University grounds, Y. M. C. A. grounds

1895 Far West college football independents records
	Conf.			Overall
Team	W	L	T	W		L		T
Occidental		–		5	–	0	–	0
New Mexico A&M		–		2	–	0	–	0
Washington Agricultural		–		2	–	0	–	0
Gonzaga		–		1	–	0	–	0
Wyoming		–		1	–	0	–	0
Stanford		–		4	–	0	–	1
Washington		–		4	–	0	–	1
California		–		3	–	1	–	1
Pacific (CA)		–		0	–	0	–	1
Saint Mary's		–		1	–	1	–	0
San Jose Normal		–		0	–	0	–	1
USC		–		0	–	1	–	1
Idaho		–		0	–	1	–	0
Utah		–		0	–	1	–	0

The 1895 Washington football team was an American football team that represented the University of Washington as an independent during the 1895 college football season. The team compiled a 4–0–1 record, shut out three of five opponents, and outscored all opponents by a combined total of 98 to 8. Ralph Nichols, who had been the team captain in 1894, was the coach in 1895. Martin Harris was the team captain.

== Schedule ==
Date	Time	Opponent	Site	Result	Attendance	Source
October 19		Seattle Athletic Club	University grounds; Seattle, WA	W 12–0 (practice)	500	
October 26	3:30 p.m.	Seattle Athletic Club	University grounds; Seattle, WA	T 0–0 (practice)	500	
November 9	3:00 p.m.	Vashon College	Y. M. C. A. grounds; Seattle, WA	W 44–4	300	
November 28	1:30 p.m.	at Tacoma Athletic Club	Eleventh Street Grounds; Tacoma, WA	W 8–4	150	
December 7	2:30 p.m.	Vashon College	University grounds; Seattle, WA	W 34–0	300	
