= 1895 Stanford football team =

American college football season

1895 Stanford football
- Conference: Independent
- Record: 4–0–1
- Head coach: Walter Camp (3rd season)

1895 Far West college football independents records
	Conf.			Overall
Team	W	L	T	W		L		T
Occidental		–		5	–	0	–	0
New Mexico A&M		–		2	–	0	–	0
Washington Agricultural		–		2	–	0	–	0
Gonzaga		–		1	–	0	–	0
Wyoming		–		1	–	0	–	0
Stanford		–		4	–	0	–	1
Washington		–		4	–	0	–	1
California		–		3	–	1	–	1
Pacific (CA)		–		0	–	0	–	1
Saint Mary's		–		1	–	1	–	0
San Jose Normal		–		0	–	0	–	1
USC		–		0	–	1	–	1
Idaho		–		0	–	1	–	0
Utah		–		0	–	1	–	0

The 1895 Stanford football team represented Stanford University in the 1895 college football season and was coached by Walter Camp in his second consecutive and third overall year with the team. It was also his last year at Stanford; he returned to Yale after the season where he served as a volunteer advisory coach for 15 years.

== Schedule ==
Date	Opponent	Site	Result
October 19	Olympic Club	Stanford, CA	W 4–0
October 22	Reliance Athletic Club	Stanford, CA	W 8–0
November 5	vs. Olympic Club	Central Park; San Francisco, CA	W 10–2
November 16	Olympic AC	Stanford, CA	W 6–0
November 29	vs. California	Central Park; San Francisco, CA (rivalry)	T 6–6
