= 1901 Utah Agricultural Aggies football team =

American college football season

1901 Utah Agricultural Aggies football
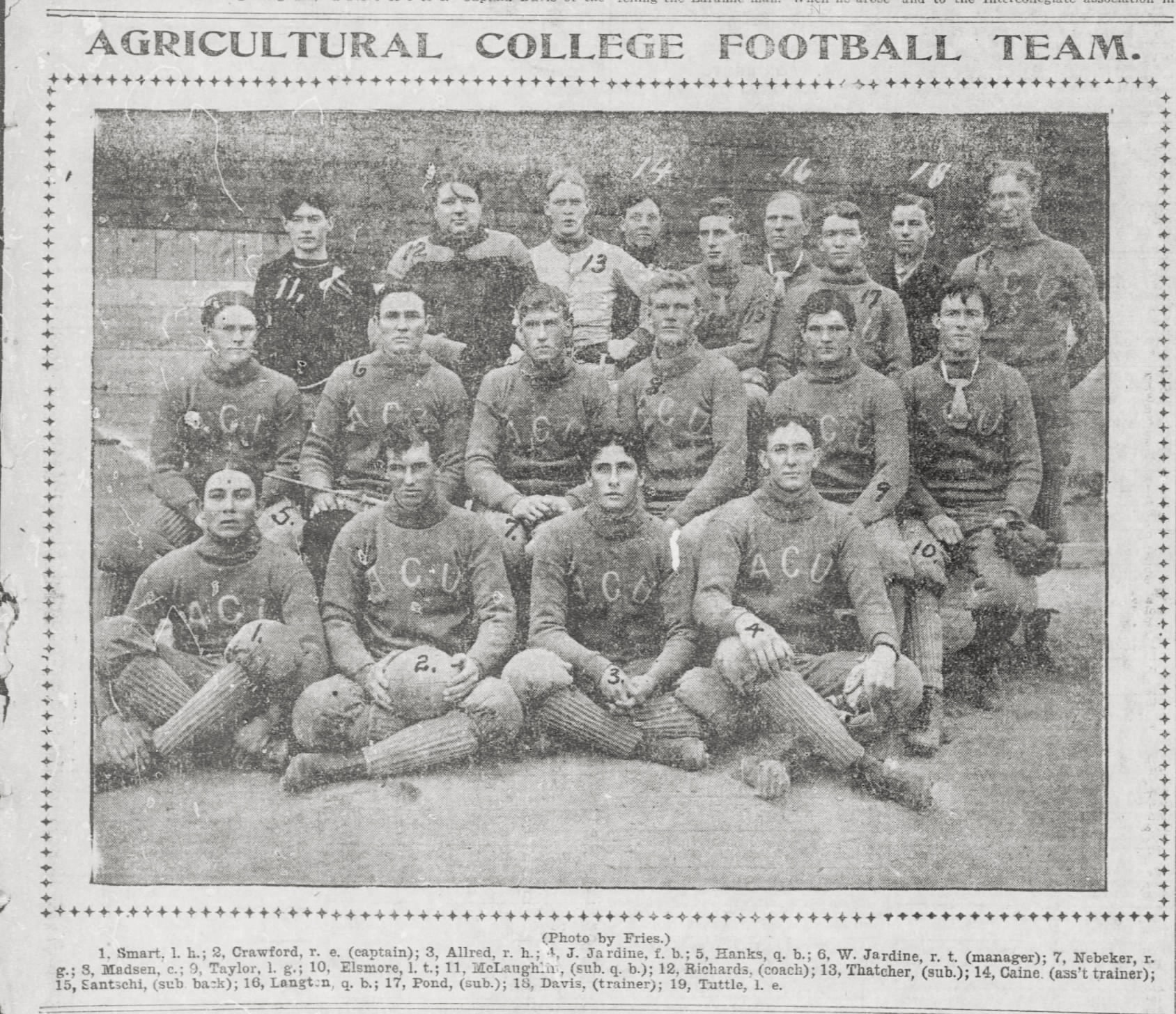
- Conference: Independent
- Record: 3–2
- Head coach: Dick Richards (1st season)
- Captain: Edmund Crawford

1901 Far West college football independents records
	Conf.			Overall
Team	W	L	T	W		L		T
Wyoming		–		1	–	0	–	0
California		–		9	–	0	–	1
Arizona		–		4	–	1	–	0
Washington Agricultural		–		4	–	1	–	0
Utah		–		3	–	1	–	0
Montana Agricultural		–		2	–	1	–	0
New Mexico A&M		–		2	–	1	–	0
Utah Agricultural		–		3	–	2	–	0
Stanford		–		3	–	2	–	2
Idaho		–		3	–	2	–	1
Washington		–		3	–	3	–	0
Nevada State		–		3	–	3	–	0
Oregon		–		3	–	4	–	1
Montana		–		2	–	3	–	0
Oregon Agricultural		–		1	–	2	–	0
New Mexico		–		0	–	3	–	1
USC		–		0	–	2	–	0

The 1901 Utah Agricultural Aggies football team was an American football team that represented Utah Agricultural College (later renamed Utah State University) during the 1901 college football season. In their first and only season under head coach Dick Richards, the Aggies compiled a 3–2 record and outscored opponents by a total of 41 to 40.

== Schedule ==
Date	Opponent	Site	Result	Attendance	Source
October 19	State School for the Deaf and Dumb	Logan, UT	W 15–5	600	
November 2	Ogden High School	Logan, UT	W 15–6		
November 9	at Utah	Salt Lake City, UT (rivalry)	L 0–17	2,000	
November 16	All Hallows	Logan, UT	L 11–12		
November 28	National Guard	Logan, UT	W 24–6		
