= 1901 California Golden Bears football team =

American college football season

1901 California Golden Bears football
- Conference: Independent
- Record: 9–0–1
- Head coach: Frank W. Simpson (1st season)
- Captain: Lloyd A. Womble

1901 Far West college football independents records
| | Conf. | | | Overall |
| Team | W | L | T | W | | L | | T |
|---|---|---|---|---|---|---|---|---|
| Wyoming | | – | | 1 | – | 0 | – | 0 |
| California | | – | | 9 | – | 0 | – | 1 |
| Arizona | | – | | 4 | – | 1 | – | 0 |
| Washington Agricultural | | – | | 4 | – | 1 | – | 0 |
| Utah | | – | | 3 | – | 1 | – | 0 |
| Montana Agricultural | | – | | 2 | – | 1 | – | 0 |
| New Mexico A&M | | – | | 2 | – | 1 | – | 0 |
| Utah Agricultural | | – | | 3 | – | 2 | – | 0 |
| Stanford | | – | | 3 | – | 2 | – | 2 |
| Idaho | | – | | 3 | – | 2 | – | 1 |
| Washington | | – | | 3 | – | 3 | – | 0 |
| Nevada State | | – | | 3 | – | 3 | – | 0 |
| Oregon | | – | | 3 | – | 4 | – | 1 |
| Montana | | – | | 2 | – | 3 | – | 0 |
| Oregon Agricultural | | – | | 1 | – | 2 | – | 0 |
| New Mexico | | – | | 0 | – | 3 | – | 1 |
| USC | | – | | 0 | – | 2 | – | 0 |

The 1901 California Golden Bears football team was an American football team that represented the University of California as an independent during the 1901 college football season. In its first season under head coach Frank W. Simpson, the team compiled a 9–0–1 record and outscored opponents by a total of 106 to 15.

== Schedule ==
| Date | Opponent | Site | Result | Source |
|---|---|---|---|---|
| September 28 | Reliance Athletic Club | Berkeley, CA | T 0–0 | |
| October 5 | Olympic Club | Berkeley, CA | W 5–0 | |
| October 10 | Olympic Club | Berkeley, CA | W 6–0 (practice) | |
| October 12 | Reliance Athletic Club | Berkeley, CA | W 6–0 | |
| October 26 | vs. Olympic Club | Richmond Field; San Francisco, CA | W 6–5 | |
| November 1 | vs. Mare Island Navy Yard | Berkeley, CA | W 16–0 | |
| November 9 | vs. Stanford | Richmond Field; San Francisco, CA (Big Game) | W 2–0 | |
| November 30 | Nevada State | Berkeley, CA | W 12–0 | |
| December 25 | at All Southern California | Los Angeles, CA | W 38–0 | |
| December 28 | at Perris Indian School | Athletic Field; Riverside, CA | W 15–10 | |
