= 1901 Washington Agricultural football team =

American college football season

1901 Washington Agricultural football

Northwest co-champion
- Conference: Independent
- Record: 4–1
- Head coach: William Namack (1st season)
- Captain: Arthur Hooper
- Home stadium: Soldier Field

1901 Far West college football independents records
	Conf.			Overall
Team	W	L	T	W		L		T
Wyoming		–		1	–	0	–	0
California		–		9	–	0	–	1
Arizona		–		4	–	1	–	0
Washington Agricultural		–		4	–	1	–	0
Utah		–		3	–	1	–	0
Montana Agricultural		–		2	–	1	–	0
New Mexico A&M		–		2	–	1	–	0
Utah Agricultural		–		3	–	2	–	0
Stanford		–		3	–	2	–	2
Idaho		–		3	–	2	–	1
Washington		–		3	–	3	–	0
Nevada State		–		3	–	3	–	0
Oregon		–		3	–	4	–	1
Montana		–		2	–	3	–	0
Oregon Agricultural		–		1	–	2	–	0
New Mexico		–		0	–	3	–	1
USC		–		0	–	2	–	0

The 1901 Washington Agricultural football team was an American football team that represented Washington Agricultural College as an independent during the 1901 college football season. In its first season under head coach William Namack, the team compiled a 4–1 record and outscored opponents by a total of 47 to 7. The team played its home games at Soldier Field in Pullman, Washington, and was recognized as the co-champion of the northwest.

== Schedule ==
Date	Opponent	Site	Result	Source
October 18	Lewiston Normal	Soldier Field; Pullman, WA	W 16–0	
October 25	at Idaho	Moscow, ID	L 0–5	
November 1	Washington	Soldier Field; Pullman, WA (rivalry)	W 10–0	
November 9	Oregon	Soldier Field; Pullman, WA	W 16–0	
November 28	at Whitman	Walla Walla, WA	W 5–2	
