= 1901 Washington football team =

American college football season

1901 Washington football
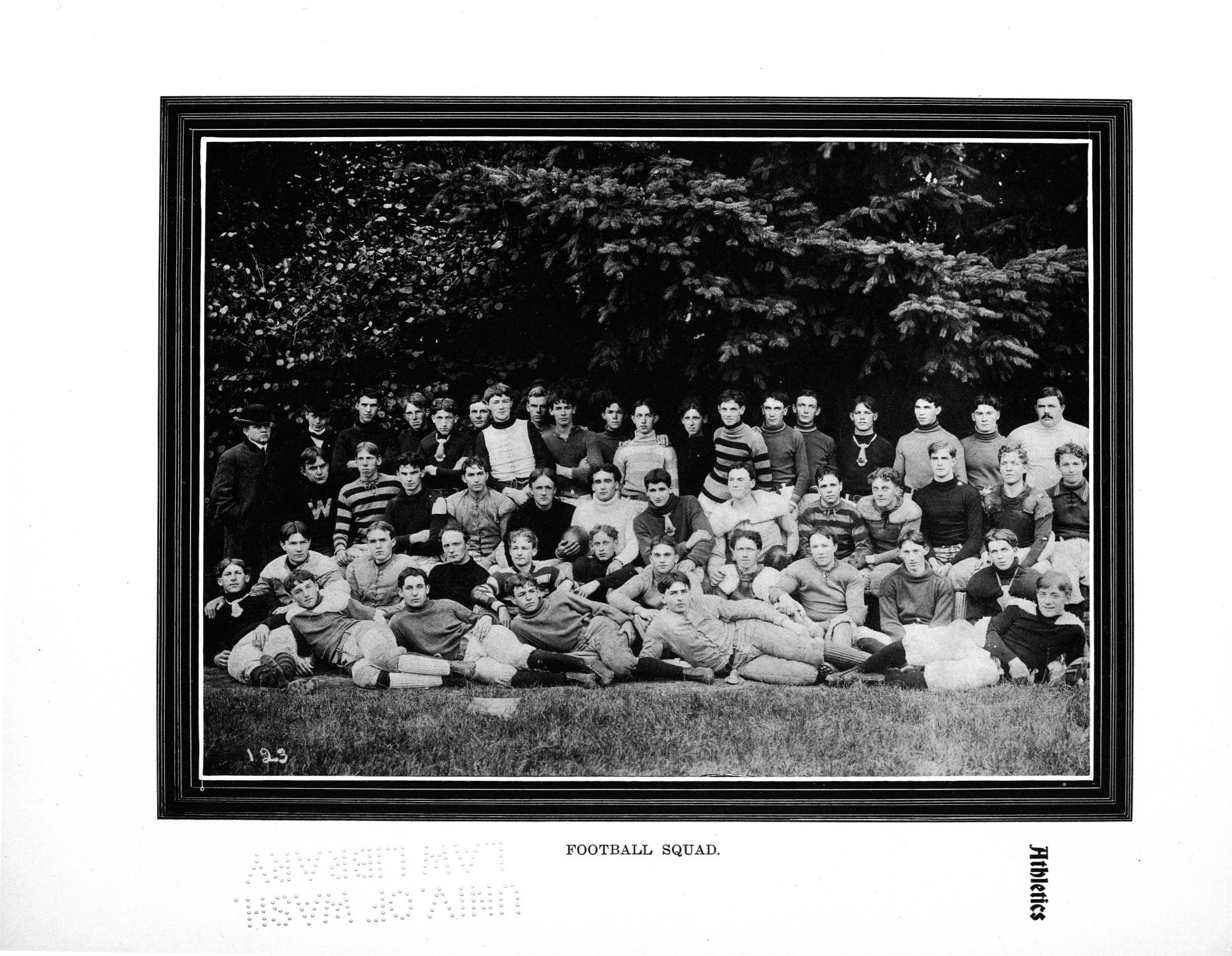
- Conference: Independent
- Record: 3–3
- Head coach: Jack Wright (1st season)
- Captain: Dick Huntoon
- Home stadium: Denny Field

1901 Far West college football independents records
	Conf.			Overall
Team	W	L	T	W		L		T
Wyoming		–		1	–	0	–	0
California		–		9	–	0	–	1
Arizona		–		4	–	1	–	0
Washington Agricultural		–		4	–	1	–	0
Utah		–		3	–	1	–	0
Montana Agricultural		–		2	–	1	–	0
New Mexico A&M		–		2	–	1	–	0
Utah Agricultural		–		3	–	2	–	0
Stanford		–		3	–	2	–	2
Idaho		–		3	–	2	–	1
Washington		–		3	–	3	–	0
Nevada State		–		3	–	3	–	0
Oregon		–		3	–	4	–	1
Montana		–		2	–	3	–	0
Oregon Agricultural		–		1	–	2	–	0
New Mexico		–		0	–	3	–	1
USC		–		0	–	2	–	0

The 1901 Washington football team was an American football team that represented the University of Washington as an independent during the 1901 college football season. In its first season under coach Jack Wright, the team compiled a 3–3 record. Dick Huntoon was the team captain.

== Schedule ==
Date	Opponent	Site	Result	Attendance	Source
October 18	Whitman	Athletic Park; Seattle, WA	L 3–12	1,000	
October 26	Vashon College	Denny Field; Seattle, WA	W 16–5	500	
November 1	at Washington Agricultural	Soldier Field; Pullman, WA (rivalry)	L 0–10	500	
November 9	Port Townsend Athletic Club	Athletic Park; Seattle, WA	W 12–0	500	
November 16	Multnomah Athletic Club	Athletic Park; Seattle, WA	L 5–16	500	
November 28	Idaho	Athletic Park; Seattle, WA	W 10–0	2,000	
