= 1901 Arizona football team =

American college football season

1901 Arizona football
- Conference: Independent
- Record: 4–1
- Head coach: William W. Skinner (2nd season)
- Captain: Leslie Gillett

1901 Far West college football independents records
	Conf.			Overall
Team	W	L	T	W		L		T
Wyoming		–		1	–	0	–	0
California		–		9	–	0	–	1
Arizona		–		4	–	1	–	0
Washington Agricultural		–		4	–	1	–	0
Utah		–		3	–	1	–	0
Montana Agricultural		–		2	–	1	–	0
New Mexico A&M		–		2	–	1	–	0
Utah Agricultural		–		3	–	2	–	0
Stanford		–		3	–	2	–	2
Idaho		–		3	–	2	–	1
Washington		–		3	–	3	–	0
Nevada State		–		3	–	3	–	0
Oregon		–		3	–	4	–	1
Montana		–		2	–	3	–	0
Oregon Agricultural		–		1	–	2	–	0
New Mexico		–		0	–	3	–	1
USC		–		0	–	2	–	0

The 1901 Arizona football team was an American football team that represented the University of Arizona as an independent during the 1901 college football season. In their second and final season under head coach William W. Skinner, the team compiled a 4–1 record and outscored their opponents, 115 to 19. All five games were played against the Tucson and Phoenix Indian Schools. The team captain was Leslie Gillett.

== Schedule ==
Date	Opponent	Site	Result	Source
	Tucson Indian School	Tucson, Arizona Territory	W 22–0	
	Tucson Indian School	Tucson, Arizona Territory	W 47–6	
	Tucson Indian School	Tucson, Arizona Territory	W 40–0	
November 9	at Phoenix Indian School	Phoenix, Arizona Territory	L 0–13	
November 29	Phoenix Indian School	Tucson, Arizona Territory	W 6–0 (forfeit)	
