= 1901 Oregon Agricultural Aggies football team =

American college football season

1901 Oregon Agricultural Aggies football
- Team captain John Gault
- Conference: Independent
- Record: 1–2
- Head coach: None
- Captain: John Gault
- Home stadium: OAC Field

1901 Far West college football independents records
	Conf.			Overall
Team	W	L	T	W		L		T
Wyoming		–		1	–	0	–	0
California		–		9	–	0	–	1
Arizona		–		4	–	1	–	0
Washington Agricultural		–		4	–	1	–	0
Utah		–		3	–	1	–	0
Montana Agricultural		–		2	–	1	–	0
New Mexico A&M		–		2	–	1	–	0
Utah Agricultural		–		3	–	2	–	0
Stanford		–		3	–	2	–	2
Idaho		–		3	–	2	–	1
Washington		–		3	–	3	–	0
Nevada State		–		3	–	3	–	0
Oregon		–		3	–	4	–	1
Montana		–		2	–	3	–	0
Oregon Agricultural		–		1	–	2	–	0
New Mexico		–		0	–	3	–	1
USC		–		0	–	2	–	0

The 1901 Oregon Agricultural Aggies football team represented Oregon Agricultural College (today's Oregon State University) as an independent during the 1901 college football season. It marked a return to intercollegiate sports for the school following a July 1900 ban on such competition imposed by the school's Board of Regents.

Three games were initially slated, all to be held on the grounds of OAC in Corvallis, Oregon. While the game with Chemawa Indian School was canceled by the Aggies at the last minute due to concerns over player eligibility on the Braves' roster, the two other games were held. Oregon Agricultural suffered shutout losses in both contests, losing by a combined score of 23–0.

Another game was scheduled later in the season, held against Willamette University on Thanksgiving Day. This ended with an OAC victory, and the team closed its year with a record of 1–2.

== Schedule ==
Date	Opponent	Site	Result	Attendance	Source
October 26	Albany College (OR)	OAC Field; Corvallis, OR	L 0–6		
November 2	Chemawa	OAC Field; Corvallis, OR	cancelled		
November 14	Pacific (OR)	OAC Field; Corvallis, OR	L 0–17		
November 28	Willamette	OAC Field; Corvallis, OR	W 17–6	500	

== Background ==
=== The 1900 ban of intercollegiate sports at OAC ===
Organized intercollegiate football was first played at Oregon Agricultural College in Corvallis, Oregon in the fall of 1893 and was played there each season through 1899. Things shut down entirely during the academic year of 1900-01, however.

On the evening of July 18, 1900, the annual meeting of the governing OAC Board of Regents passed a resolution prohibiting "students of the Agricultural college from engaging in inter-collegiate athletic contests, or contests with any other college, school or club." This decision encompassed intercollegiate sports only, and the faculty was urged to "encourage as much as possible all healthful athletic or other sports upon the grounds of the college."

In its resolution, the OAC Board declared that intercollegiate sports had developed into a "form of mania that is demoralizing to the moral, mental, and physical well-being of college students" and added that "records of all educational institutions" indicated that the academic performance of athletes compared "in nearly all cases unfavorably with the standing of other students."

An alternative resolution defending athletics and calling for the employment of an athletic director was proposed and handily defeated, with the original resolution banning intercollegiate sports passing over just two votes of opposition.

The athletic editor of the OAC literary monthly speculated that contributing factors probably included the gross expenditure of time, "disgraceful playing tactics" and numerous injuries on the gridiron, unruly crowd behavior, and gambling by students.

Local reaction to the decision among the Corvallis community seems to have been active and divided, with a narrow majority seemingly opposed to the board's action. The number of supporters were not insignificant, however, with their general perspective put into words by B.F. Irvine in his Corvallis Times:

"Physical athletics within reason are as essential as mental athletics, but when the former is carried to the extent that it becomes predominate, all absorbing and supreme, as is now the trend, it results in demoralization and is hurtful. Pursued widely and long enough, the product would be a race of big-muscled and little-headed men, an exultation of the brute, a subordination of the better traits.... Intercollegiate contests induce gambling and rowdyism. Whether or not it is best for young students to come under these influences is a serious question whose answer most concerns fathers and mothers."

The state's largest newspaper, The Oregonian, in an editorial reprinted by the rival Corvallis Gazette, begged to differ, declaring:

"Opponents of athletics are three in kind — those who hate them as Byron hated the waltz, because he couldn't dance; those who are moved to anguish by the sight of human beings in a state of enjoyment, and those who denounce college sports as a cover for their passion for the brutalities of the prize-ring. If any such are among the regents of the Corvallis institution, their joy should be short-lived."

This decision did not impact sports at the University of Oregon, which continued its intercollegiate football and other athletic programs unabated during this interval.

=== Football at OAC during the ban ===
OAC President Thomas Gatch bought dinner for the winners of the first football game of the 1900–01 academic year played on campus.

The ban of intercollegiate competition meant the end of the association with OAC of at least three members of the 1899 team. OAC lettermen Ray Goodrich, W.B. Scott, and Sam Thurston transferred to the University of Oregon to join the Webfoots squad for the 1900 season. Those who remained at the school and who continued with the game did so without the benefit of professional coaching.

The prohibition of intercollegiate football by the Board of Regents did not completely eliminate the game at OAC, however. During the 1900-01 academic year, freshman students residing at Cauthorn Hall on campus formed their own gridiron eleven and played competitively against a team organized by young men living in downtown Corvallis. Two games were played between the two sides, the first on Saturday, January 19, 1901 — said to be the first football game of the year played on the college field. The townies scored three touchdowns in each half, en route to a 32–0 wipeout of the Cauthorn team — said to have been greatly hampered by the fact that many of them had never played a game of football before. College President Thomas Gatch treated the victors and game officials to a dinner at Hall's Restaurant, with about 15 people assembled to benefit from his largesse.

A rematch was held on campus on February 2, 1901 — won by the downtowners by a slightly less lopsided score of 10–0. A "large number of spectators" braved a blustery day to attend the "fast and furious" second act, the Corvallis Gazette reported.

On February 16 another match was held on campus, touted in the local press in advance as "Tomorrow's Great Game," pitting eleven members of the OAC faculty against the school's freshman team. Several members of this freshman team would provide a nucleus of experienced players for the school's full-fledged return to the sport in 1902.

=== The return of intercollegiate football to OAC in 1901 ===
The 1901 OAC Board of Regents, which returned intercollegiate sports to the school. Board President James Weatherford is fifth from the left; Governor of Oregon T.T. Geer is second from right.

The annual meeting of the OAC Board of Regents held in Corvallis on July 17, 1901. The meeting elected new officers for a two year turn and moved towards reversal of the board's 1900 ban of intercollegiate athletic competition. By unanimous vote, the board referred the matter of intercollegiate athletics to OAC President Gatch and new president of the Board James Weatherford, with the duo granted explicit power to act based upon their own judgment.

This committee of two was instructed to first gain the assent of "all the leading colleges" for a "reform of rules that will do away with professionalism and confine games to pure intercollegiate contests." At issue, it may be presumed, was a ban on the use of non-student athletes as "ringers" in intercollegiate competition, which was a matter not only of regional, but national, concern.

Three formal and published "Athletic Rules" were shortly adopted by OAC to enable the school's return to intercollegiate sport: 1. Only bona fide students, committed to take on a full year's academic work were to be able to compete for OAC; 2. No student who had previously played for another college could compete for OAC until they had completed one full year's work and passed examinations; 3. No player who had ever received pay or compensation above actual expenses for participating in any sport could compete for OAC.

The July about-face by the Board of Regents allowed a return of intercollegiate football for the 1901 season, albeit with no apparatus for the employment of professional coaching and time only to cobble together a limited schedule. Three games were placed on the docket: Albany College for October 26, Chemawa Indian School for November 2, and Pacific University of Forest Grove on November 14. The Chemawa game was ultimately canceled at the last minute by OAC over eligibility concerns over one or more players on the Indians' roster.

Although there was no meeting of the Aggies with their top rival, the University of Oregon Webfoots, on November 23 the second teams of the two squads tangled on the grounds of OAC. Eleven men played all 60 minutes for both teams, with none of the OAC players appearing who had played in the previous week's game against Pacific. "The farmers" emerged triumphant over "the dudes," the Corvallis Gazette happily reported — three touchdowns to one, 15–5. The second team also played a game on the road against Oregon State Normal School in Monmouth on Thanksgiving Day, losing that contest by a score of 6–0.

In addition, a game was scheduled for November 30 for the freshman team against Hill Military Academy.

== Roster ==
The November 23 game between the second teams of the OAC Aggies and Oregon Webfoots was a ticketed event.

According to a report in the Salem Statesman, the following was the starting lineup for OAC in the Thanksgiving Day game against Willamette University:

- LE: Nash
- LT: Cochrane
- LG: Wilkes
- C: Albert Bower
- RG: Wells
- RT: Sweek
- RE: Gellately
- QB: Laughlin
- LHB: Williams
- RHB: Rose
- FB: John Gault (captain)
- Substitutes: Junkin, Cupper
