= 1901 Nevada State Sagebrushers football team =

American college football season

1901 Nevada State Sagebrushers football
- Conference: Independent
- Record: 3–3
- Head coach: Allen Steckle (1st season)
- Captain: B. C. Leadbetter
- Home stadium: Evans Field

1901 Far West college football independents records
	Conf.			Overall
Team	W	L	T	W		L		T
Wyoming		–		1	–	0	–	0
California		–		9	–	0	–	1
Arizona		–		4	–	1	–	0
Washington Agricultural		–		4	–	1	–	0
Utah		–		3	–	1	–	0
Montana Agricultural		–		2	–	1	–	0
New Mexico A&M		–		2	–	1	–	0
Utah Agricultural		–		3	–	2	–	0
Stanford		–		3	–	2	–	2
Idaho		–		3	–	2	–	1
Washington		–		3	–	3	–	0
Nevada State		–		3	–	3	–	0
Oregon		–		3	–	4	–	1
Montana		–		2	–	3	–	0
Oregon Agricultural		–		1	–	2	–	0
New Mexico		–		0	–	3	–	1
USC		–		0	–	2	–	0

The 1901 Nevada State Sagebrushers football team was an American football team that represented Nevada State University (now known as the University of Nevada, Reno) as an independent during the 1901 college football season. In its first season under head coach Allen Steckle, the team compiled a 3–3 record.

== Schedule ==
Date	Opponent	Site	Result	Attendance	Source
October 13	Chico State	Evans Field; Reno, NV	W 47–0		
October 19	Reliance Athletic Club	Evans Field; Reno, NV	W 11–0		
October 30	at California	Berkeley, CA	L 0–12		
November 2	at Stanford	Stanford, CA	L 0–12		
November 26	Olympic Club	Evans Field; Reno, NV	L 0–5		
November 28	at Utah	Walker's Field; Salt Lake City, UT	W 6–2	4,000–5,000	
