= 1901 New Mexico A&M Aggies football team =

American college football season

1901 New Mexico A&M Aggies football
- Conference: Independent
- Record: 2–1
- Head coach: John O. Miller (2nd season)
- Home stadium: College Field

1901 Far West college football independents records
	Conf.			Overall
Team	W	L	T	W		L		T
Wyoming		–		1	–	0	–	0
California		–		9	–	0	–	1
Arizona		–		4	–	1	–	0
Washington Agricultural		–		4	–	1	–	0
Utah		–		3	–	1	–	0
Montana Agricultural		–		2	–	1	–	0
New Mexico A&M		–		2	–	1	–	0
Utah Agricultural		–		3	–	2	–	0
Stanford		–		3	–	2	–	2
Idaho		–		3	–	2	–	1
Washington		–		3	–	3	–	0
Nevada State		–		3	–	3	–	0
Oregon		–		3	–	4	–	1
Montana		–		2	–	3	–	0
Oregon Agricultural		–		1	–	2	–	0
New Mexico		–		0	–	3	–	1
USC		–		0	–	2	–	0

The 1901 New Mexico A&M Aggies football team was an American football team that represented New Mexico College of Agriculture and Mechanical Arts (now known as New Mexico State University) as an independent during the 1901 college football season. In their second, non-consecutive year under head coach John O. Miller, the Aggies compiled a 2–1 record and outscored opponents by a total of 38 to 6. The team played home games on College Field, later renamed Miller Field in honor of coach Miller.

== Schedule ==
Date	Opponent	Site	Result	Source
	at New Mexico Normal	Las Vegas, New Mexico Territory	L 0–6	
	at Albuquerque Indian School	Albuquerque, New Mexico Territory	W 5–0	
January 1, 1902	at Albuquerque Guards	Fair grounds; Albuquerque, New Mexico Territory	W 33–0	
