= 1901 Stanford football team =

American college football season

1901 Stanford football

Rose Bowl, L 0–49 vs. Michigan
- Conference: Independent
- Record: 3–2–2
- Head coach: Charles Fickert (1st season)

1901 Far West college football independents records
	Conf.			Overall
Team	W	L	T	W		L		T
Wyoming		–		1	–	0	–	0
California		–		9	–	0	–	1
Arizona		–		4	–	1	–	0
Washington Agricultural		–		4	–	1	–	0
Utah		–		3	–	1	–	0
Montana Agricultural		–		2	–	1	–	0
New Mexico A&M		–		2	–	1	–	0
Utah Agricultural		–		3	–	2	–	0
Stanford		–		3	–	2	–	2
Idaho		–		3	–	2	–	1
Washington		–		3	–	3	–	0
Nevada State		–		3	–	3	–	0
Oregon		–		3	–	4	–	1
Montana		–		2	–	3	–	0
Oregon Agricultural		–		1	–	2	–	0
New Mexico		–		0	–	3	–	1
USC		–		0	–	2	–	0

The 1901 Stanford football team was an American football team that represented Stanford University as an independent during the 1901 college football season. The team was led by Charles Fickert, the first former Stanford player to serve as head football coach at his alma mater. The team played its home games at Stanford, California.

Stanford compiled a 3–1–2 record in the regular season and was invited to represent the West in the Tournament East-West football game to be held in Tournament Park in Pasadena, California on New Year's Day, 1902, facing East representative Michigan, a team which had yet to yield a point all season. Stanford had no better luck, losing 49–0 in what would eventually be known as the Rose Bowl.

== Schedule ==
Date	Opponent	Site	Result	Attendance	Source
September 28	Olympic Club	Stanford, CA	W 6–0		
October 5	vs. Reliance Athletic Club	16th and Folsom Street Grounds; San Francisco, CA	T 0–0		
October 12	vs. Olympic Club	16th and Folsom Street Grounds; San Francisco, CA	T 6–6		
October 26	Reliance Athletic Club	Stanford, CA	W 10–0		
November 2	Nevada State	Stanford, CA	W 12–0		
November 9	vs. California	16th and Folsom Street Grounds; San Francisco, CA (Big Game)	L 0–2		
January 1, 1902	vs. Michigan	Tournament Park; Pasadena, CA (Rose Bowl)	L 0–49	8,500	

== Game summaries ==
=== Michigan (Tournament East–West Football Game) ===
After the conclusion of the 1901 football season, Stanford was invited to play against Michigan in a game to be held on New Year's Day, 1902 in Tournament Park in Pasadena, California. The game was dubbed the Tournament East–West Football Game and was held as part of the Tournament of Roses event to encourage tourism to the mild climate of Southern California at a time of year when most of the nation was experiencing cold winter weather.

In the game, Stanford was no match for Michigan, which had outscored its opponents 501–0 during the regular season. Led by fullback Neil Snow, who ran for five touchdowns, the Wolverines led 49–0 with eight minutes remaining before the teams agreed to end the game early. The outcome of the game soured the Tournament of Roses committee on football, and it was not until 1916 that football was again included as part of the festivities. The game is considered the first-ever postseason bowl game in college football.
