= William Namack =

American football player and coach (1876–1933)

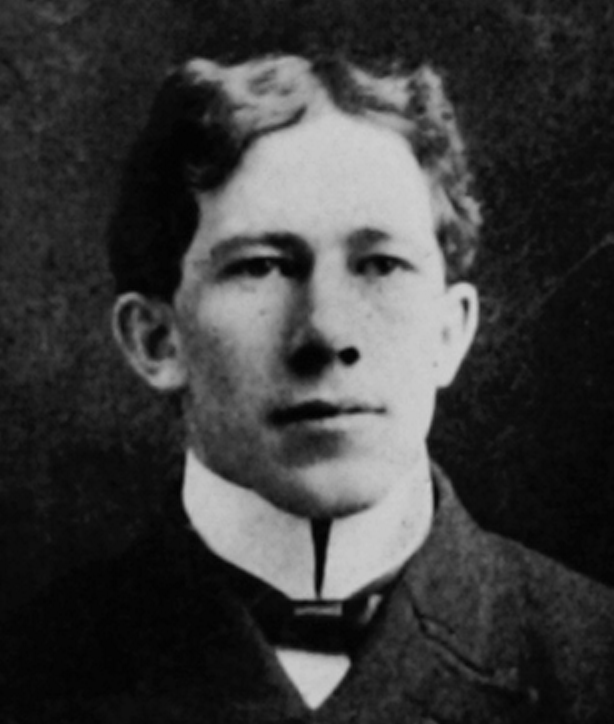
- Namack pictured in the 1901 Class Book, Cornell University

Biographical details
- Born: March 8, 1876; Phelps, New York, U.S.
- Died: September 24, 1933 (aged 57); Springfield, Massachusetts, U.S.
- Education: Cornell

Playing career
- 1900: Cornell

Coaching career (HC unless noted)
- 1901: Washington Agricultural

Head coaching record
- Overall: 4–1

William Henry Namack (March 8, 1876 – September 24, 1933) was an American college football player and coach. He served as the head football coach at Washington Agricultural College and School of Science—now Washington State University—for one season in 1901, compiling a record of 4–1.

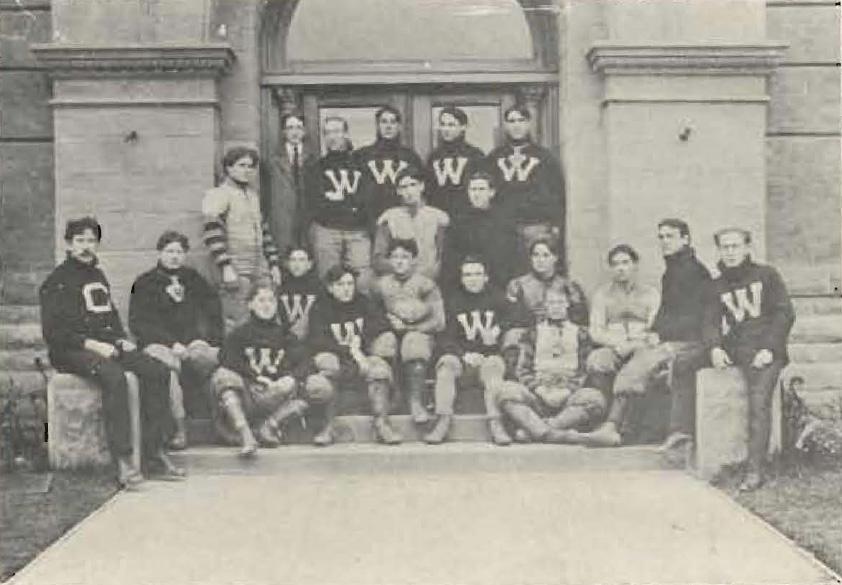
Washington Agricultural football team, 1901, pictured in The Chinook 1904, Washington State yearbook. Namack is pictured at the left end of the last row (with the "C" sweater).

Namack died on September 24, 1933, at Springfield Hospital in Springfield, Massachusetts.

== Head coaching record ==
Year	Team	Overall	Conference	Standing	Bowl/playoffs
Washington Agricultural (Independent) (1901)
1901	Washington Agricultural	4–1			
Washington Agricultural:		4–1			
Total:		4–1			
