= 1901 Oregon Webfoots football team =

American college football season

1901 Oregon Webfoots football
- Conference: Independent
- Record: 3–4–1
- Head coach: Warren W. Smith (1st season)
- Captain: F. T. Zeigler
- Home stadium: Kincaid Field

1901 Far West college football independents records
	Conf.			Overall
Team	W	L	T	W		L		T
Wyoming		–		1	–	0	–	0
California		–		9	–	0	–	1
Arizona		–		4	–	1	–	0
Washington Agricultural		–		4	–	1	–	0
Utah		–		3	–	1	–	0
Montana Agricultural		–		2	–	1	–	0
New Mexico A&M		–		2	–	1	–	0
Utah Agricultural		–		3	–	2	–	0
Stanford		–		3	–	2	–	2
Idaho		–		3	–	2	–	1
Washington		–		3	–	3	–	0
Nevada State		–		3	–	3	–	0
Oregon		–		3	–	4	–	1
Montana		–		2	–	3	–	0
Oregon Agricultural		–		1	–	2	–	0
New Mexico		–		0	–	3	–	1
USC		–		0	–	2	–	0

The 1901 Oregon Webfoots football team represented the University of Oregon in the 1901 college football season. It was the Webfoots' eighth season; they competed as an independent and were led by head coach Warren W. Smith. They finished the season with a record of three wins, four losses and one tie (3–4–1).

== Schedule ==
Date	Opponent	Site	Result	Attendance	Source
October 26	Chemawa	Kincaid Field; Eugene, OR	W 11–0	500	
November 2	Multnomah Athletic Club	Kincaid Field; Eugene, OR	L 0–5		
November 6	at Idaho	Moscow, ID	T 0–0		
November 9	at Washington Agricultural	Soldier Field; Pullman, WA	L 0–16		
November 12	at Whitman	Walla Walla, WA	L 0–6		
November 13	at Pendleton High School	Pendleton, OR	W 12–0		
November 28	at Multnomah Athletic Club	Portland, OR	L 0–17		
November 30	at Pacific (OR)	Forest Grove, OR	W 10–0		
