= Warren W. Smith =

American football player and coach

Playing career
- 1898–1900: California
- Position: Halfback

Coaching career (HC unless noted)
- 1901: Oregon
- 1903: Oregon

Head coaching record
- Overall: 7–6–2

Warren W. Smith was an American college football player and coach. He served as the head football coach at the University of Oregon in 1901 and 1903, compiling a record of 7–6–2. Smith played college football at the University of California, Berkeley as a halfback football from 1898 to 1900.

== Head coaching record ==
Year	Team	Overall	Conference	Standing	Bowl/playoffs
Oregon Webfoots (Independent) (1901)
1901	Oregon	3–4–1			
Oregon Webfoots (Independent) (1903)
1903	Oregon	4–2–1			
Oregon:		7–6–2			
Total:		7–6–2			
