= Frank W. Simpson =

American football player and coach (1871–1929)

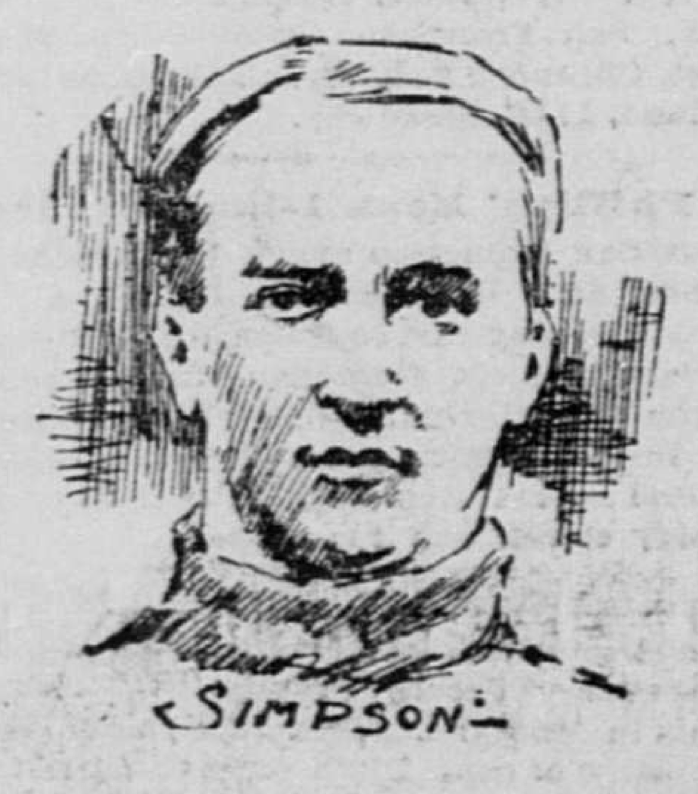
- Sketch of Simpson in The San Francisco Call, 1896

Biographical details
- Born: 1871; Pacheco, California, U.S.
- Died: December 8, 1929 (aged 57) near Alvarado, California, U.S.

Playing career
- 1895–1897: California
- Position: Tackle

Coaching career (HC unless noted)
- 1898–1899: Oregon
- 1901: California

Head coaching record
- Overall: 15–3–2

Frank William Simpson (1871 – December 8, 1929) was an American college football player and coach. He served as the head football coach at the University of Oregon from 1898 to 1899 and at the University of California, Berkeley in 1901, compiling a career coaching record of 15–3–2. From 1898 to 1899, he guided the Oregon Webfoots to a 6–3–1 record. At California in 1901, he coached the Golden Bears to a 9–0–1 record.

Simpson was killed instantly when his car crashed into a tree when he and his wife were returning from a duck hunt hear Alvarado, California in December 1929. His wife later died in the hospital.

== Head coaching record ==
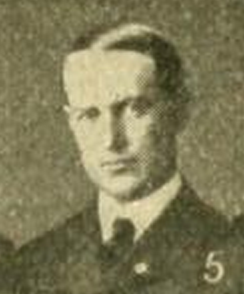
Simpson pictured in the 1901 California football team photo

Year	Team	Overall	Conference	Standing	Bowl/playoffs
Oregon Webfoots (Independent) (1898–1899)
1898	Oregon	3–1			
1899	Oregon	3–2–1			
Oregon:		6–3–1			
California Golden Bears (Independent) (1901)
1901	California	9–0–1			
California:		9–0–1			
Total:		15–3–2			
