= 1901 USC Methodists football team =

American college football season

1901 USC Methodists football
- Conference: Independent
- Record: 0–2
- Head coach: Clair S. Tappaan (1st season)
- Captain: Logan Wheatley
- Home stadium: Fiesta Park

1901 Far West college football independents records
	Conf.			Overall
Team	W	L	T	W		L		T
Wyoming		–		1	–	0	–	0
California		–		9	–	0	–	1
Arizona		–		4	–	1	–	0
Washington Agricultural		–		4	–	1	–	0
Utah		–		3	–	1	–	0
Montana Agricultural		–		2	–	1	–	0
New Mexico A&M		–		2	–	1	–	0
Utah Agricultural		–		3	–	2	–	0
Stanford		–		3	–	2	–	2
Idaho		–		3	–	2	–	1
Washington		–		3	–	3	–	0
Nevada State		–		3	–	3	–	0
Oregon		–		3	–	4	–	1
Montana		–		2	–	3	–	0
Oregon Agricultural		–		1	–	2	–	0
New Mexico		–		0	–	3	–	1
USC		–		0	–	2	–	0

The 1901 USC Methodists football team was an American football team that represented the University of Southern California (USC) as an independent during the 1901 college football season.

The team lost its only intercollegiate game of the year to Pomona College. The team also played a game against an All-Southern California all-star team, losing by a 45 to 0 score.

== Schedule ==
Date	Time	Opponent	Site	Result	Source
November 23	3:00 p.m.	All-Southern California	Fiesta Park; Los Angeles, CA	L 0–45	
December 7	2:30 p.m.	at Pomona	Pomona Recreation Park; Pomona, CA	L 0–6	
