= Burton, Washington =

Unincorporated community in Washington, United States

Burton
- Unincorporated community
- Location within the state of Washington
- Coordinates: 47°23′21″N 122°27′33″W
- Country: United States
- State: Washington
- County: King
- Time zone: UTC-8 (Pacific (PST))
  - Summer (DST): UTC-7 (PDT)
- ZIP code: 98013

Burton is an unincorporated community in King County, Washington. It is a historic waterfront residential area on Vashon Island. The town of Burton sits at the isthmus between Inner and Outer Quartermaster Harbor. The town was named in 1892 by Mrs. Miles Hatch after her home town in Illinois, and in that year development began in Burton with the Vashon College and the Burton Store. Industries around Burton at that time included logging, shingle manufacturing and brickmaking.

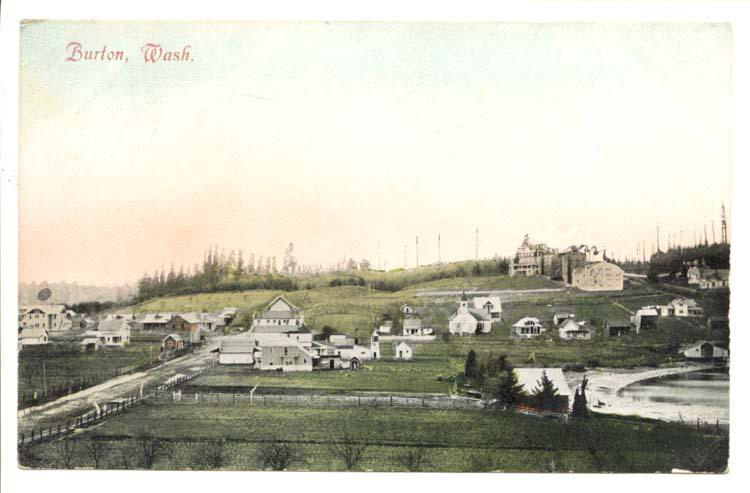
Old postcard showing Burton circa 1910. Vashon College is visible on the top right.

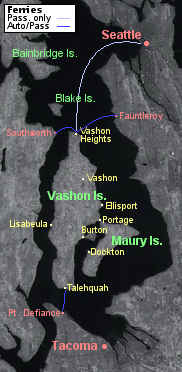
Detailed map of Vashon Island, Washington
