= 1901 University of New Mexico football team =

American college football season

1901 University of New Mexico football
- Conference: Independent
- Record: 0–3–1
- Head coach: Joe Napier (1st season)

1901 Far West college football independents records
	Conf.			Overall
Team	W	L	T	W		L		T
Wyoming		–		1	–	0	–	0
California		–		9	–	0	–	1
Arizona		–		4	–	1	–	0
Washington Agricultural		–		4	–	1	–	0
Utah		–		3	–	1	–	0
Montana Agricultural		–		2	–	1	–	0
New Mexico A&M		–		2	–	1	–	0
Utah Agricultural		–		3	–	2	–	0
Stanford		–		3	–	2	–	2
Idaho		–		3	–	2	–	1
Washington		–		3	–	3	–	0
Nevada State		–		3	–	3	–	0
Oregon		–		3	–	4	–	1
Montana		–		2	–	3	–	0
Oregon Agricultural		–		1	–	2	–	0
New Mexico		–		0	–	3	–	1
USC		–		0	–	2	–	0

The 1901 University of New Mexico football team was an American football team represented the University of New Mexico as an independent during the 1901 college football season. The team compiled a 0–3–1 record and outscored all opponents by a total of 111 to 34. Joe Napier was the coach and team captain. Prane was a co-captain.

== Schedule ==
Date	Opponent	Site	Result	Source
November 9	Central School	Albuquerque, New Mexico Territory	T 0–0	
November 16	at New Mexico Normal	Las Vegas, New Mexico Territory	L 0–32	
November 28	Central School	Albuquerque, New Mexico Territory	L 0–11	
December 7	Albuquerque Indian School	Albuquerque, New Mexico Territory	L 7–11	
