= 1901 Wyoming Cowboys football team =

American college football season

1901 Wyoming Cowboys football
- Conference: Independent
- Record: 1–0
- Head coach: William McMurray (2nd season)
- Captain: None

1901 Far West college football independents records
	Conf.			Overall
Team	W	L	T	W		L		T
Wyoming		–		1	–	0	–	0
California		–		9	–	0	–	1
Arizona		–		4	–	1	–	0
Washington Agricultural		–		4	–	1	–	0
Utah		–		3	–	1	–	0
Montana Agricultural		–		2	–	1	–	0
New Mexico A&M		–		2	–	1	–	0
Utah Agricultural		–		3	–	2	–	0
Stanford		–		3	–	2	–	2
Idaho		–		3	–	2	–	1
Washington		–		3	–	3	–	0
Nevada State		–		3	–	3	–	0
Oregon		–		3	–	4	–	1
Montana		–		2	–	3	–	0
Oregon Agricultural		–		1	–	2	–	0
New Mexico		–		0	–	3	–	1
USC		–		0	–	2	–	0

The 1901 Wyoming Cowboys football team represented the University of Wyoming as an independent during the 1901 college football season. In its second season under head coach William McMurray, the team played only one game, defeating the Laramie Athletic Club by a 38–0 score. There was no team captain.

== Schedule ==
Date	Opponent	Site	Result	Source
November 28	Laramie Athletic Club	Laramie, WY	W 38–0	
