= 1901 Montana football team =

American college football season

1901 Montana football
- Conference: Independent
- Record: 2–3
- Head coach: Frank Bean (2nd season)

1901 Far West college football independents records
	Conf.			Overall
Team	W	L	T	W		L		T
Wyoming		–		1	–	0	–	0
California		–		9	–	0	–	1
Arizona		–		4	–	1	–	0
Washington Agricultural		–		4	–	1	–	0
Utah		–		3	–	1	–	0
Montana Agricultural		–		2	–	1	–	0
New Mexico A&M		–		2	–	1	–	0
Utah Agricultural		–		3	–	2	–	0
Stanford		–		3	–	2	–	2
Idaho		–		3	–	2	–	1
Washington		–		3	–	3	–	0
Nevada State		–		3	–	3	–	0
Oregon		–		3	–	4	–	1
Montana		–		2	–	3	–	0
Oregon Agricultural		–		1	–	2	–	0
New Mexico		–		0	–	3	–	1
USC		–		0	–	2	–	0

The 1901 Montana football team represented the University of Montana in the 1901 college football season. They were led by second-year head coach Frank Bean, and finished the season with a record of two wins and three losses (2–3).

== Schedule ==
Date	Opponent	Site	Result	Attendance	Source
October 19	Fort Shaw Indian School	Missoula, MT	L 0–5		
October 26	at Butte High School	Athletic Park; Butte, MT	L 11–25		
November 2	Fort Missoula	Missoula, MT	W 12–0		
November 9	Fort Missoula	Missoula, MT	W 26–0		
November 28	at Montana Agricultural	Bozeman, MT (rivalry)	L 0–31	2,000	
