= 1895 University of Utah football team =

American college football season

1895 University of Utah football
- Conference: Independent
- Record: 0–1
- Head coach: Walter Shoup (1st season)
- Home stadium: University campus

1895 Far West college football independents records
	Conf.			Overall
Team	W	L	T	W		L		T
Occidental		–		5	–	0	–	0
New Mexico A&M		–		2	–	0	–	0
Washington Agricultural		–		2	–	0	–	0
Gonzaga		–		1	–	0	–	0
Wyoming		–		1	–	0	–	0
Stanford		–		4	–	0	–	1
Washington		–		4	–	0	–	1
California		–		3	–	1	–	1
Pacific (CA)		–		0	–	0	–	1
Saint Mary's		–		1	–	1	–	0
San Jose Normal		–		0	–	0	–	1
USC		–		0	–	1	–	1
Idaho		–		0	–	1	–	0
Utah		–		0	–	1	–	0

The 1895 University of Utah football team was an American football team that represented the University of Utah as an independent during the 1895 college football season. Head coach Walter Shoup led the team to a 0–1 record.

== Schedule ==
Date	Time	Opponent	Site	Result	Attendance	Source
November 28	2:30 p.m.	Salt Lake City YMCA	University campus; Salt Lake City, Utah Territory	L 0–20	1,500	
