= Thomas M. Fitzpatrick =

American athlete and coach (1891–1986)

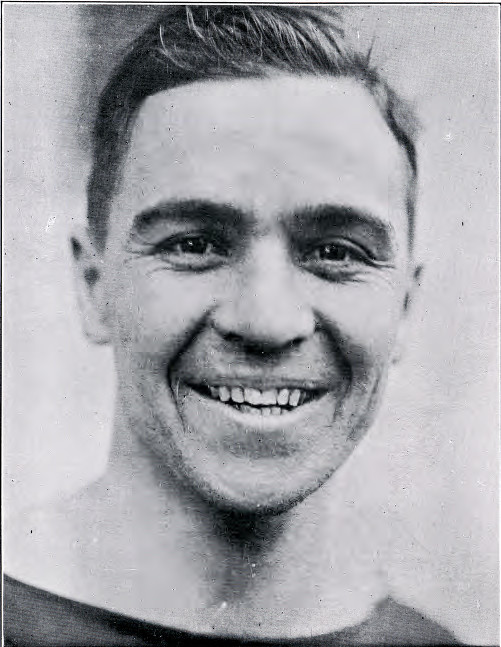
- Fitzpatrick pictured in the 1921 Utonian, Utah yearbook

Biographical details
- Born: January 21, 1891; Deer Lodge, Montana, U.S.
- Died: June 24, 1986 (aged 95); Aptos, California, U.S.

Playing career

Football
- 1911–1912: Utah

Basketball
- 1911–1912: Utah

Coaching career (HC unless noted)

Football
- 1919–1924: Utah

Basketball
- 1917–1925: Utah

Baseball
- 1918–1921: Utah

Head coaching record
- Overall: 23–17–3 (college football); 42–30 (college basketball); 14–8 (college baseball)

Accomplishments and honors

Championships
- Football; 1 RMC (1922)

Thomas M. Fitzpatrick (January 21, 1891 – June 24, 1986) was an American football and basketball player, coach of football, basketball, and baseball, and football official. He served as the head football coach at the University of Utah from 1919 to 1924, compiling a record of 23–17–3. From 1917 to 1925, he was the coach of the Utah men's basketball team; his teams had a cumulative record of 42–30. Fitzpatrick was also the head baseball coach at Utah from 1918 to 1921, tallying a mark of 14–8.

Fitzpatrick was a native of Montana. After leaving Utah, he moved to Oakland, California, to coach high school sports. There he coached football, basketball, and baseball at Roosevelt High School from 1926 to 1944 and at McClymonds High School from 1945 to 1956. He also officiated 12 Rose Bowls, including the 1929 Rose Bowl, famous for Roy Riegels's wrong-way run. Fitzpatrick died on June 24, 1986, at the age of 95. He had been a resident of Aptos, California, since 1962.

== Head coaching record ==
=== College football ===
Year	Team	Overall	Conference	Standing	Bowl/playoffs
Utah Utes (Rocky Mountain Conference) (1919–1924)
1919	Utah	5–2	3–1	2nd	
1920	Utah	1–5–1	1–2–1	5th	
1921	Utah	3–2–1	2–1–1	3rd	
1922	Utah	7–1	5–0	1st	
1923	Utah	4–3	2–3	6th	
1924	Utah	3–4–1	2–2–1	7th	
Utah:		23–17–3	15–9–3		
Total:		23–17–3			
National championship Conference title Conference division title or championship game berth
