= 1901 University of Utah football team =

American college football season

1901 University of Utah football
- Conference: Independent
- Record: 3–1
- Head coach: Harvey Holmes (2nd season)
- Home stadium: Walker's Field

1901 Far West college football independents records
	Conf.			Overall
Team	W	L	T	W		L		T
Wyoming		–		1	–	0	–	0
California		–		9	–	0	–	1
Arizona		–		4	–	1	–	0
Washington Agricultural		–		4	–	1	–	0
Utah		–		3	–	1	–	0
Montana Agricultural		–		2	–	1	–	0
New Mexico A&M		–		2	–	1	–	0
Utah Agricultural		–		3	–	2	–	0
Stanford		–		3	–	2	–	2
Idaho		–		3	–	2	–	1
Washington		–		3	–	3	–	0
Nevada State		–		3	–	3	–	0
Oregon		–		3	–	4	–	1
Montana		–		2	–	3	–	0
Oregon Agricultural		–		1	–	2	–	0
New Mexico		–		0	–	3	–	1
USC		–		0	–	2	–	0

The 1901 University of Utah football team was an American football team that represented the University of Utah as an independent during the 1901 college football season. In its second season under head coach Harvey Holmes, the team compiled a 3–1 record.

== Schedule ==
Date	Time	Opponent	Site	Result	Attendance	Source
October 19	3:30 p.m.	Ogden High School	Walker's Field; Salt Lake City, UT	W 12–0		
October 26	3:45 p.m.	All Hallows College	Walker's Field; Salt Lake City, UT	W 16–0		
November 9		Utah Agricultural	Walker's Field; Salt Lake City, UT (rivalry)	W 17–0	2,000	
November 28		Nevada State	Walker's Field; Salt Lake City, UT	L 2–6	4,000–5,000	
