= Fred Waite (American football) =

American football coach

Biographical details
- Born: 1875
- Died: May 2, 1905 (aged 30); Portland, Oregon, U.S.

Coaching career (HC unless noted)
- 1894: Washington Agricultural (assistant)
- 1895: Washington Agricultural

Head coaching record
- Overall: 2–0

Fredrick W. Waite (1875 – May 2, 1905) was an American college football coach and cyclist. He served as the head football coach at Washington Agricultural College and School of Science—now known as Washington State University—for one season in 1895, compiling a record of 2–0. He was also an assistant coach for Washington Agricultural's first team, in 1894. Waite began cycling in 1892, and by 1895 he was considered one of the best bicycle riders on the West Coast of the United States.

A native of Colfax, Washington, Waite was the son of W. W. Waite, a pioneer of the city. He married Ida Grant Woodward, on December 27, 1897, in Colfax. The couple had three children before her death in 1903. Waite was a traveling salesman for the Honeyman De Hart Hardware company and later moved to Pendelton, Oregon, where he managed the Pendleton Hotel. Following a bout of influenza in 1905, Waite developed an abscess in the mastoid cell behind his right ear. After an operation to remove the abscess, he suffered from blindness, deafness, and partial paralysis before dying on May 2, 1905, in Portland, Oregon.

== Head coaching record ==
Year	Team	Overall	Conference	Standing	Bowl/playoffs
Washington Agricultural (Independent) (1895)
1895	Washington Agricultural	2–0			
Washington Agricultural:		2–0			
Total:		2–0			
