= Charles Gatehouse =

American football player and coach (1877–1924)

Biographical details
- Born: September 12, 1877; Salt Lake City, Utah, U.S.
- Died: September 4, 1924 (aged 46); Utah, U.S.

Coaching career (HC unless noted)
- 1899: Utah

Head coaching record
- Overall: 2–1

Charles Frederick Gatehouse (September 12, 1877 – September 4, 1924) was an American college football coach. He served as the head football coach at the University of Utah in 1899, compiling a record of 2–1. He had previously been a student at Utah in the 1890s.

== Head coaching record ==
Year	Team	Overall	Conference	Standing	Bowl/playoffs
Utah Utes (Independent) (1899)
1899	Utah	2–1			
Utah:		2–1			
Total:		2–1			
