= Walter Shoup =

American lawyer and politician (1872–1945)

Biographical details
- Born: June 5, 1872; Salmon, Idaho, U.S.
- Died: October 30, 1945 (aged 73); Washington, D.C., U.S.
- Education: Yale Law (LLB, 1893)

Coaching career (HC unless noted)
- 1895: Utah

Head coaching record
- Overall: 0–1

Walter Campbell Shoup (June 5, 1872 – October 30, 1945) was an American attorney, politician, college football coach, and army serviceman.

== Early life ==
Shoup was the son of United States Senator George L. Shoup. He attended Yale Law School, graduating in 1893.

== Football coaching ==
Shoup served as the head football coach at the University of Utah in 1895, compiling a record of 0–1.

== Politics ==
In 1888, Shoup was a private secretary to the Governor of Idaho. In 1908, he served a term in the Idaho State Senate.

== Military service ==
Shoup was an army serviceman in the Spanish–American War. He was buried in Arlington National Cemetery.

== Head coaching record ==
Year	Team	Overall	Conference	Standing	Bowl/playoffs
Utah Utes (Independent) (1895)
1895	Utah	0–1			
Utah:		0–1			
Total:		0–1			
