= 1905 Cheney Normal football team =

American college football season

1905 Cheney Normal football
- Conference: Independent
- Record: 4–3
- Head coach: Henry E. Smith (2nd season)

1905 Far West college football independents records
	Conf.			Overall
Team	W	L	T	W		L		T
Stanford		–		8	–	0	–	0
Idaho		–		5	–	0	–	0
New Mexico A&M		–		3	–	0	–	0
Colorado		–		8	–	1	–	0
New Mexico		–		5	–	1	–	1
Utah		–		6	–	2	–	0
California		–		4	–	1	–	2
Oregon Agricultural		–		6	–	3	–	0
USC		–		6	–	3	–	1
Arizona		–		4	–	2	–	0
Oregon		–		4	–	2	–	2
Washington		–		4	–	2	–	2
Washington State		–		4	–	4	–	0
Utah Agricultural		–		2	–	2	–	1
Wyoming		–		3	–	4	–	0
Montana		–		2	–	3	–	0
Montana Agricultural		–		1	–	2	–	1
Nevada State		–		0	–	3	–	1
Colorado State Normal		–		0	–	2	–	0
Tempe Normal		–		0	–	3	–	0

The 1905 Cheney Normal football team represented the State Normal School at Cheney—now known as Eastern Washington University—as an independent during the 1905 college football season. Led by Henry E. Smith in his second and final season as head coach, Cheney Normal compiled a record of 4–3.

== Schedule ==
Date	Opponent	Site	Result	Source
October 21	Davenport High School	Cheney, WA	W 47–0	
November 5	at Coeur d'Alene High School	Coeur d'Alene, ID	L 0–6	
November 11	Ritzville High School	Cheney, WA	W 49–0	
November 17	Coeur d'Alene High School	Cheney, WA	L 6–11	
November 18	Oakesdale High School	Cheney, WA	W 17–0	
November 25	Colfax High School	Cheney, WA	W 17–0	
December 8	at Colfax High School	Colfax, WA	L 0–17	
