= 1903 University of New Mexico football team =

American college football season

1903 University of New Mexico football
- Conference: Independent
- Record: 3–0–1
- Head coach: Walter McEwan (1st season)
- Captain: John A. Cannon

1903 Far West college football independents records
	Conf.			Overall
Team	W	L	T	W		L		T
Stanford		–		8	–	0	–	3
California		–		6	–	1	–	2
Washington		–		6	–	1	–	0
Oregon		–		4	–	2	–	1
USC		–		4	–	2	–	0
Albany College (OR)		–		4	–	3	–	0
Utah Agricultural		–		3	–	0	–	0
New Mexico A&M		–		2	–	0	–	1
Arizona		–		2	–	0	–	0
Tempe Normal		–		2	–	0	–	0
Idaho		–		4	–	2	–	0
Wyoming		–		3	–	2	–	0
Washington Agricultural		–		3	–	3	–	2
Utah		–		3	–	5	–	0
Nevada State		–		2	–	4	–	2
Oregon Agricultural		–		2	–	4	–	1
Montana		–		2	–	5	–	0
Academy of Idaho		–		0	–	1	–	1

The 1903 University of New Mexico football team was an American football team that represented the University of Dayton as an independent during the 1903 college football season. In its first season under head coach Walter McEwan, the team compiled a 3–0–1 record.

== Schedule ==
Date	Opponent	Site	Result	Source
October 3	Albuquerque Minors	Albuquerque, New Mexico Territory	W 8–0	
October 12	Albuquerque Indian School	Albuquerque, New Mexico Territory	W 11–0	
November 7	Albuquerque Minors	Albuquerque, New Mexico Territory	T 0–0	
November 21	Santa Fe Indian School	Albuquerque, New Mexico Territory	W 11–0	
