= 1905 Colorado State Normal football team =

American college football season

1905 Colorado State Normal football
- Conference: Independent
- Record: 0–2
- Head coach: Samuel E. Abbott (1st season)

1905 Far West college football independents records
	Conf.			Overall
Team	W	L	T	W		L		T
Stanford		–		8	–	0	–	0
Idaho		–		5	–	0	–	0
New Mexico A&M		–		3	–	0	–	0
Colorado		–		8	–	1	–	0
New Mexico		–		5	–	1	–	1
Utah		–		6	–	2	–	0
California		–		4	–	1	–	2
Oregon Agricultural		–		6	–	3	–	0
USC		–		6	–	3	–	1
Arizona		–		4	–	2	–	0
Oregon		–		4	–	2	–	2
Washington		–		4	–	2	–	2
Washington State		–		4	–	4	–	0
Utah Agricultural		–		2	–	2	–	1
Wyoming		–		3	–	4	–	0
Montana		–		2	–	3	–	0
Montana Agricultural		–		1	–	2	–	1
Nevada State		–		0	–	3	–	1
Colorado State Normal		–		0	–	2	–	0
Tempe Normal		–		0	–	3	–	0

The 1905 Colorado State Normal football team represented the State Normal School of Colorado—now known as University of Northern Colorado—as an independent during the 1905 college football season. Led by Samuel E. Abbott in his first and only season as head coach, Colorado State Normal compiled a record of 0–2.

== Schedule ==
Date	Opponent	Site	Result	Source
October 21	Colorado Agricultural	Greeley, CO	L 5–6	
November 5	at Wyoming	Laramie, WY	L 0–22	
