= 1903 Cheney Normal football team =

American college football season

1903 Cheney Normal football
- Conference: Independent
- Record: 3–2–2
- Head coach: Claude Arthur (1st season)

1903 Far West college football independents records
	Conf.			Overall
Team	W	L	T	W		L		T
Stanford		–		8	–	0	–	3
Montana Agricultural		–		1	–	0	–	1
California		–		6	–	1	–	2
Washington		–		6	–	1	–	0
Oregon		–		4	–	2	–	1
USC		–		4	–	2	–	0
Albany College (OR)		–		4	–	3	–	0
Utah Agricultural		–		3	–	0	–	0
New Mexico A&M		–		2	–	0	–	1
Arizona		–		2	–	0	–	0
Tempe Normal		–		2	–	0	–	0
Idaho		–		4	–	2	–	0
Wyoming		–		3	–	2	–	0
Cheney Normal		–		3	–	2	–	2
Washington Agricultural		–		3	–	3	–	2
Utah		–		3	–	5	–	0
Nevada State		–		2	–	4	–	2
Oregon Agricultural		–		2	–	4	–	1
Montana		–		2	–	5	–	0
Academy of Idaho		–		0	–	1	–	1

The 1903 Cheney Normal football team represented the State Normal School at Cheney—now known as Eastern Washington University—as an independent during the 1903 college football season. Led by Claude Arthur in his first and only season as head coach, Cheney Normal compiled a record of 3–2–2.

== Schedule ==
Date	Time	Opponent	Site	Result	Attendance	Source
October 10	10:35 a.m.	at Spokane High School	Natatorium Park; Spokane, WA	T 6–6		
October 17		at Davenport Athletic Club	Davenport, WA	T 5–5		
October 24		Davenport High School	Cheney, WA	W 10–0		
October 31		at Blair Business	Natatorium Park; Spokane, WA	W 25–0		
November 7		Spokane High School	Cheney, WA	L 5–12	300	
November 14		Blair Business	Cheney, WA	W 11–0		
November 26		at Lewiston State Normal	Lewiston, ID	L 0–41		
