= Allen Steckle =

American football player and coach (1872–1938)

- Steckle as an All-American in 1898

Biographical details
- Born: July 1872; Freeport, Michigan, U.S.
- Died: March 4, 1938 (aged 65)

Playing career
- 1897–1899: Michigan
- Position: Tackle

Coaching career (HC unless noted)
- 1901–1903: Nevada State
- 1904–1905: Oregon Agricultural

Head coaching record
- Overall: 16–14–2

Accomplishments and honors

Awards
- Second-team All-American (1898)

Allen Chubb Steckle (July 1872 – March 4, 1938) was an American football player and coach. He played tackle for the University of Michigan from 1897 to 1899 and was selected as an All-American in 1898. Steckle served as the head football coach at the Nevada State University—now known as the University of Nevada, Reno—from 1901 to 1903 and Oregon State University, known then as Oregon Agricultural College, from 1904 to 1905, compiling a career head coaching record of 16–14–2. In 1903, his Nevada State Sagebrushers team, drawn from a school with 80 students, defeated the California Golden Bears.

== Early years ==
Steckle was born in July 1872 at Freeman, Michigan. His father, Abraham B. Steckle, was born in Waterloo Township, Ontario, Canada, in 1842, and worked as a farmer. His mother, Sarah (Furtney) Steckle, was also a native of Waterloo Township. His parents were married in December 1867 in Waterloo County, Ontario. At the time of the 1880 United States census, Steckle was residing with his parents and six siblings in Campbell Township, Michigan.

== University of Michigan ==
Steckle played football for the University of Michigan from 1897 to 1899 and was captain of the 1899 team. In 1898, Steckle was among the first western players to be named to an All-American team after being selected by Walter Camp as his second-team tackle. He helped Michigan win its first Western Conference championship in 1898 and was selected as the best tackle in the West. One newspaper wrote that he was "as good a defensive player as one will find anywhere."

== Coaching career ==
=== Nevada State ===
From 1901 to 1903, Steckle served as the head football coach at the Nevada State University. In 1903, he was also appointed to the position as the university's Physical Director. In his three seasons as the head coach, he compiled a 6–9–2 record. When Steckle's Nevada Sagebrushers team defeated the California Golden Bears in 1903, it was the cause of a statewide celebration. The entire front page of the Daily Nevada State Journal was given to coverage of the game, and the banner headline read: "CALIFORNIA'S PROUD COLORS LOWERED BY THE DOUGHTY ELEVEN FROM SAGEBRUSHDOM." Steckle's picture appeared on the front page, and the paper praised his efforts in turning Nevada into a football power:

Out of the eighty students of the N.S.U. have been selected eleven young men who were moulded into shape by Dr. Steckle, the best football coach who ever came to the Coast. He made of them the peers of the flower of the California universities.

The victory of a university with only 80 students over the University of California with its 3,000 students was hailed as a historic accomplishment, and "Coach Steckle's brand of 'roughhouse'" play was given much of the credit.

Headline in the Nevada State Journal announcing Coach Steckle's Nevada State Sagebrushers' upset of Cal, November 1903.

Steckle's star players at Nevada State from 1901 to 1903 were his younger brother, Ivan X. Steckle, who played halfback, and Abe Steckle, who played tackle. Ivan Steckle was reportedly "the hero of all Nevada during the football season of 1903, when in a game with the University of California on the U.C. field, he grabbed the football close to the Nevada goal line and made a wonderful 86-yard run to the California goal line, scoring a touchdown for the Sagebrush players and bringing victory to the team." Ivan left Nevada after the 1903 season to follow his older brother to the University of Michigan Medical School. Ivan died from typhoid fever in 1909, and Steckle accompanied his brother's body to the family's old home in Freeport, Michigan.

In 1919, a Nevada newspaper rated Steckle as the best football coach Nevada ever had and described his accomplishments as follows:

It was under the coaching of Dr. Steckle that Nevada was able to defeat the University of California and play a tie with Stanford as well as bang it over the crack athletic club teams that San Francisco boasted when the great college game was in its hey dey. He was rated at that time as one of the best coaches in the West.

Steckle was also remembered at Nevada for his ability to instill "college spirit" in the school's student body. In 1919, a Nevada newspaper noted that "there was more enthusiasm displayed in college athletics while he was coach than there has been in all the years since he left." As a medical doctor and athletic coach, Steckle was also known for his belief in physical conditioning. He was known to require every athlete to be in perfect physical condition before playing in any intercollegiate or "big" game.

Steckle was also a basketball coach. While at Nevada, he coached the women's basketball team to "a high stage of perfection, being able to take the measure of all the coast college teams."

=== Oregon State University ===
After his success with the 1903 Nevada State team, Steckle was offered a higher salary to take over as the football coach at Oregon State University. He served as Oregon State's head coach from 1904 to 1905 and compiled a 10–5 record in those two seasons.

== Medical career ==
After graduating from the University of Michigan in 1899, Steckle enrolled in the Illinois College of Physicians and Surgeons. Steckle's principal profession was as a medical doctor and surgeon. However, he took time out of his medical practice to coach college football for several years.

After the 1905 football season, Steckle decided to quit coaching and focus on his medical practice. At the time of the 1920 United States census, he was living in Vancouver, Washington with his wife, Margaret (born c. 1887) and two daughters, Catherine J. Steckle and Sarah E. Steckle. His occupation was listed as a physician in general practice. He maintained his medical practice for many years in Battle Ground, Washington. At the time of the 1930 United States census, Steckle was living in South Battle Ground, Washington, with daughters Catherine J. and S. Elizabeth Steckle, and his sister-in-law, Nesbit Daline. His occupation was listed as a physician and surgeon.

== Death ==
On March 4, 1938, Steckle, 65, was found dead beside his automobile on a side road near his home with "a .38 caliber bullet through his head." Steckle left his home the previous night for a house call and never returned. Several threatening letters were found among Steckle's papers, including one demanding "$2,000 or else."

== Head coaching record ==
Year	Team	Overall	Conference	Standing	Bowl/playoffs
Nevada State Sagebrushers (Independent) (1901–1903)
1901	Nevada State	3–3			
1902	Nevada State	1–2			
1903	Nevada State	2–4–2			
Nevada State:		6–9–2			
Oregon Agricultural Aggies (Independent) (1904–1905)
1904	Oregon Agricultural	4–2			
1905	Oregon Agricultural	6–3			
Oregon Agricultural:		10–5			
Total:		16–14–2			
