= 1905 Colorado Agricultural Aggies football team =

American college football season

1905 Colorado Agricultural Aggies football
- Conference: Colorado Football Association
- Record: 3–4 (2–3 CFA)
- Head coach: John H. McIntosh (2nd season)
- Home stadium: Durkee Field

The 1905 Colorado Agricultural Aggies football team represented Colorado Agricultural College (now known as Colorado State University) in the Colorado Football Association (CFA) during the 1905 college football season. In their second and final season under head coach John H. McIntosh, the Aggies compiled a 3–4 record and were outscored by a total of 95 to 67.

== Schedule ==
Date	Opponent	Site	Result	Source
October 7	Denver	Durkee Field; Fort Collins, CO	W 12–0	
October 21	at Colorado State Normal	Greeley, CO	W 6–5	
October 28	Colorado Mines	Durkee Field; Fort Collins, CO	L 10–17	
November 4	at Colorado College	Washburn Field; Colorado Springs, CO	L 0–33	
November 18	at Denver	Denver, CO	L 5–11	
November 25	Wyoming*	Durkee Field; Fort Collins, CO (rivalry)	W 34–5	
November 30	at Utah*	Cummings Field; Salt Lake City, UT	L 0–24	
*Non-conference game
