= 1903 Colorado Agricultural Aggies football team =

American college football season

1903 Colorado Agricultural Aggies football
- Conference: Colorado Football Association
- Record: 5–1 (3–1 CFA)
- Head coach: Matt Rothwell (1st season)
- Home stadium: Durkee Field

1903 Colorado Football Association standings
	Conf.					Overall
Team	W		L		T	W		L		T
Colorado $	4	–	0	–	0	8	–	2	–	0
Colorado Agricultural	3	–	1	–	0	5	–	1	–	0
Colorado Mines	2	–	2	–	0	3	–	4	–	0
Colorado College	1	–	3	–	0	4	–	5	–	0
Denver	0	–	4	–	0	6	–	7	–	0
$ – Conference champion

The 1903 Colorado Agricultural Aggies football team represented Colorado Agricultural College (now known as Colorado State University) in the Colorado Football Association (CFA) during the 1903 college football season In their first and only season under head coach Matt Rothwell, the Aggies compiled a 5–1 record (3–1 against CFA opponents), finished second in the conference, and outscored all opponents by a total of 67 to 24.

== Schedule ==
Date	Opponent	Site	Result	Source
October 10	Colorado	Durkee Field; Fort Collins, CO (rivalry)	L 0–5	
October 24	Colorado Mines	Durkee Field; Fort Collins, CO	W 10–2	
November 3	at Colorado College	Washburn Field; Colorado Springs, CO	W 8–5	
November 14	Wyoming*	Durkee Field; Fort Collins, CO (rivalry)	W 17–0	
November 21	at Denver	Denver, CO	W 16–6	
November 26	at Utah*	Cummings Field; Salt Lake City, UT	W 16–6	
*Non-conference game
