= John G. Griffith =

American football player and sports coach (1880–1948)

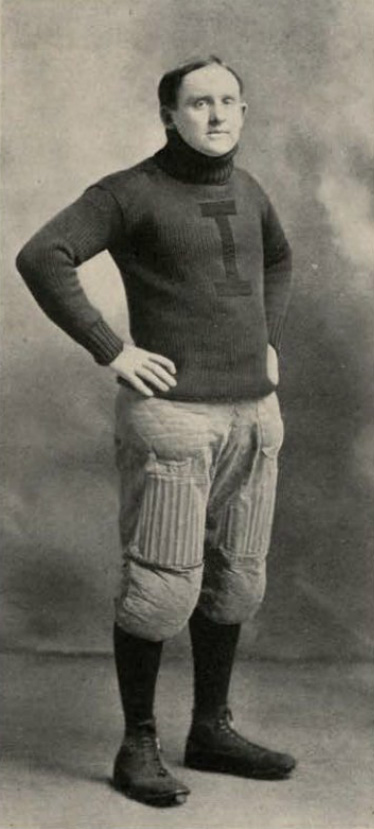
- The Gem of the Mountains 1907, University of Idaho yearbook

Biographical details
- Born: January 4, 1880; Iowa City, Iowa, U.S.
- Died: March 23, 1948 (aged 68); Pasadena, California, U.S.

Playing career
- 1897–1900: Iowa
- Position: Fullback

Coaching career (HC unless noted)

Football
- 1901: Simpson (IA)
- 1902–1906: Idaho
- 1907–1908: Iowa (assistant)
- 1909: Iowa
- 1910–1914: Idaho
- 1915–1916: Oklahoma A&M
- 1917: New Mexico A&M

Basketball
- 1905–1907: Idaho
- 1908–1910: Iowa
- 1910–1915: Idaho
- 1915–1917: Oklahoma A&M
- 1917–1920: New Mexico A&M

Baseball
- 1903–1907: Idaho
- 1911–1915: Idaho

Administrative career (AD unless noted)
- 1918–1921: New Mexico A&M

Head coaching record
- Overall: 49–38–5 (football); 101–80 (basketball); 9–5 (baseball)

John George "Pink" Griffith (January 4, 1880 – March 23, 1948) was an American football player and coach of football, basketball, and baseball.

He served as the head football coach at Simpson College (1901), the University of Idaho (1902–1906, 1910–1914), the University of Iowa (1909), Oklahoma Agricultural and Mechanical College—now Oklahoma State University–Stillwater (1915–1916), and New Mexico College of Agriculture and Mechanic Arts—now New Mexico State University (1917), compiling a career college football record of 49–38–5. Griffith was also the head basketball coach at Idaho (1905–1907, 1910–1915), Iowa (1907–1910), Oklahoma A&M (1915–1917), and New Mexico A&M (1917–1920), tallying a career college basketball mark of 101–80. He also coached baseball at Idaho for eight seasons.

== Playing career ==
Born in Iowa City, Iowa, Griffith was a four-time college football letter winner for the University of Iowa from 1897 to 1900. Griffith, a fullback, played for some of the greatest teams in Iowa football history.

Against Illinois in 1899, Griffith returned a punt 85 yards as Iowa won, 58–0, to cap an undefeated season. After the game, referee R. T. Hoagland of Princeton said, "The dodging run of Griffith down the field for a touchdown was the best piece of individual playing that I ever saw. The men (of the 1899 Hawkeyes) are all stars; they make the best team I ever saw."

In Iowa's first year in the Western Conference (now known as the Big Ten) in 1900, Griffith was named Iowa's team captain. The team won the Western Conference title in Iowa's first year in the league. Iowa had to settle for a controversial 5–5 tie against Northwestern in Griffith's final game at Iowa. The entire team except Griffith ate a bad batch of creamed potatoes and got food poisoning the day before the game.

Still, Griffith did not suffer a defeat in his final twenty games as a player at Iowa, going 17–0–3. His last collegiate loss was late in his sophomore season.

== Coaching career ==
Griffith graduated from Iowa in 1901, and coached at Simpson (IA) for a year. In 1902, he was hired as head football coach and athletic director at the University of Idaho in Moscow. When Iowa football coach Alden Knipe retired after the 1902 season, school officials considered hiring Griffith but went with John Chalmers instead. Griffith continued as Idaho's football coach through 1906.

When Chalmers was succeeded by Mark Catlin as Iowa's head coach, Griffith left Idaho to serve as Catlin's assistant coach at Iowa in 1907 and 1908. the 1908–1909 season, Iowa's first basketball season in the Big Ten.

Prior to the 1909 football season, Caitlin left Iowa for Lawrence University in Wisconsin, and the Hawkeyes hired Griffith as their ninth head football coach. He was the first Iowa graduate to lead the football team and coached Iowa to a 2–4–1 record in 1909; the star player that season was Walter "Stub" Stewart.

Griffith finished out the 1909–1910 basketball season, his third as a head basketball coach. His team went 11–3 that year, bringing Griffith's three year basketball coaching record to 29–14. After the basketball season, Griffith announced he was leaving Iowa, and Stewart replaced him as the basketball coach.

After just one season as head football coach, Griffith left Iowa and returned to Idaho to become the head of their entomology department. He also served as their head football coach again from 1910 through 1914, and his ten-year record at Idaho was 28–22–2 (.558).

Griffith also coached football at Oklahoma A&M (now Oklahoma State University) in 1915 and 1916, compiling an 8–9–1 record. In 1917, he led the football team at New Mexico A&M (now New Mexico State University) to a 4–2 record.

== Death ==
Griffith died in 1948 at age 68 in Pasadena, California, and is buried at Forest Lawn Memorial Park in Glendale.

== Head coaching record ==
=== Football ===
Year	Team	Overall	Conference	Standing
Simpson Red and Gold (Independent) (1901)
1901	Simpson	7–1–1		
Simpson:		7–1–1		
Idaho (Independent) (1902–1906)
1902	Idaho	1–3–1		
1903	Idaho	4–2		
1904	Idaho	2–1		
1905	Idaho	5–0		
1906	Idaho	2–4		
Iowa Hawkeyes (Western Conference / Missouri Valley Intercollegiate Athletic Association) (1909)
1909	Iowa	2–4–1	0–1 / 1–3–1	7th / 4th
Iowa:		2–4–1	0–1 / 1–3–1	
Idaho (Northwest Conference) (1910–1914)
1910	Idaho	4–2	2–2	4th
1911	Idaho	4–3	1–2	5th
1912	Idaho	2–2	2–2	T–2nd
1913	Idaho	3–3	2–2	T–3rd
1914	Idaho	2–3–1	1–3	5th
Idaho:		29–23–2	8–11	
Oklahoma A&M Aggies (Southwest Conference) (1915–1916)
1915	Oklahoma A&M	4–5–1	0–3	8th
1916	Oklahoma A&M	4–4	0–3	7th
Oklahoma A&M:		8–9–1	0–6	
New Mexico A&M Aggies (Independent) (1917)
1917	New Mexico A&M	4–2		
New Mexico State:		4–2		
Total:		49–38–5		

== See also ==
- List of college football head coaches with non-consecutive tenure
