= 1905 Wyoming Cowboys football team =

American college football season

1905 Wyoming Cowboys football
- Conference: Independent
- Record: 3–4
- Head coach: William McMurray (6th season)
- Captain: Herbert Kennedy

1905 Far West college football independents records
	Conf.			Overall
Team	W	L	T	W		L		T
Stanford		–		8	–	0	–	0
Idaho		–		5	–	0	–	0
New Mexico A&M		–		3	–	0	–	0
Colorado		–		8	–	1	–	0
New Mexico		–		5	–	1	–	1
Utah		–		6	–	2	–	0
California		–		4	–	1	–	2
Oregon Agricultural		–		6	–	3	–	0
USC		–		6	–	3	–	1
Arizona		–		4	–	2	–	0
Oregon		–		4	–	2	–	2
Washington		–		4	–	2	–	2
Washington State		–		4	–	4	–	0
Utah Agricultural		–		2	–	2	–	1
Wyoming		–		3	–	4	–	0
Montana		–		2	–	3	–	0
Montana Agricultural		–		1	–	2	–	1
Nevada State		–		0	–	3	–	1
Colorado State Normal		–		0	–	2	–	0
Tempe Normal		–		0	–	3	–	0

The 1905 Wyoming Cowboys football team represented the University of Wyoming as an independent during the 1905 college football season. In its sixth season under head coach William McMurray, the team compiled a 3–4 record and was outscored by a total of 162 to 63. Herbert Kennedy was the team captain.

== Schedule ==
Date	Opponent	Site	Result	Source
October 7	at Utah	Cummings Field; Salt Lake City, UT	L 0–31	
October 15	at Colorado Mines	Golden, CO	L 0–28	
October 22	at Colorado	Gamble Field; Boulder, CO	L 0–69	
November 5	Colorado State Normal	Laramie, WY	W 22–0	
November 18	at Cheyenne High School	Cheyenne, WY	W 10–0	
November 25	at Colorado Agricultural	Fort Collins, CO (rivalry)	L 5–34	
November 30	Fort Warren	Laramie, WY	W 26–0	
