= Thomas L. McFadden =

American football player and coach (1878–1963)

Thomas McFadden
Biographical details
- Born: April 24, 1878; Placentia, California, U.S.
- Died: February 27, 1963; Orange County, California, U.S.

Playing career
- 1899–1900: Stanford
- Position: End

Coaching career (HC unless noted)
- 1901–1902: Pacific (OR)
- 1903: Oregon Agricultural
- 1904: DePauw

Head coaching record
- Overall: 12–11–2

Thomas Lewis McFadden (April 24, 1878 – February 27, 1963) was an American college football player at Stanford University who was also a football coach at Pacific University, Oregon Agricultural College, and DePauw University.

== Early life and career ==
McFadden was born to William and Sarah McFadden, who were among the early settlers in Placentia, California.

He attended Fullerton Union High School, and graduated from Stanford University in 1900 where he played on the school's football team. He attended Stanford Law School, and was admitted to the bar in 1903.

== College coaching career ==
While enrolled in law school, McFadden began coaching college football, first at Pacific University in Forest Grove, Oregon, for the 1901 and 1902 seasons, earning a record of 0–1–1 the first season and 2–4 the second for an overall record 2–5–1. In 1903, McFadden coached one season at Oregon Agricultural College with a record of 2–4–1. In 1904, McFadden coached one season for DePauw, ending with a record of 8–2.

== After football ==
McFadden worked as an attorney in Bellingham, Washington, from 1908 to 1912, when he married Lucana Forster and returned to Placentia to continue his practice. He died on February 27, 1963, at the age of 84. He was buried in Fullerton, California.

== Head coaching record ==
Year	Team	Overall	Conference	Standing	Bowl/playoffs
Pacific Badgers (Independent) (1901–1902)
1901	Pacific	0–1–1			
1902	Pacific	2–4			
Pacific:		2–5–1			
Oregon Agricultural Aggies (Independent) (1903)
1903	Oregon Agricultural	2–4–1			
Oregon Agricultural:		2–4–1			
DePauw (Independent) (1904)
1904	DePauw	8–2			
DePauw:		8–2			
Total:		12–11–2			
