= 1905 Utah Agricultural Aggies football team =

American football team

1905 Utah Agricultural Aggies football
- Conference: Independent
- Record: 2–2–1
- Head coach: George P. Campbell (4th season)
- Home stadium: U.A.C. athletic field

1905 Far West college football independents records
	Conf.			Overall
Team	W	L	T	W		L		T
Stanford		–		8	–	0	–	0
Idaho		–		5	–	0	–	0
New Mexico A&M		–		3	–	0	–	0
Colorado		–		8	–	1	–	0
New Mexico		–		5	–	1	–	1
Utah		–		6	–	2	–	0
California		–		4	–	1	–	2
Oregon Agricultural		–		6	–	3	–	0
USC		–		6	–	3	–	1
Arizona		–		4	–	2	–	0
Oregon		–		4	–	2	–	2
Washington		–		4	–	2	–	2
Washington State		–		4	–	4	–	0
Utah Agricultural		–		2	–	2	–	1
Wyoming		–		3	–	4	–	0
Montana		–		2	–	3	–	0
Montana Agricultural		–		1	–	2	–	1
Nevada State		–		0	–	3	–	1
Tempe Normal		–		0	–	3	–	0

The 1905 Utah Agricultural Aggies football team was an American football team that represented Utah Agricultural College (later renamed Utah State University) during the 1905 college football season. In their fourth season under head coach George P. Campbell, the Aggies compiled a 2–2–1 record and outscored their opponents by a total of 48 to 38.

== Schedule ==
Date	Opponent	Site	Result	Attendance	Source
October 21	Fort Douglas	Logan, UT	W 15–5		
October 28	All Hallows	Logan, UT	W 28–0		
November 7	at Montana	Missoula, MT	L 0–23		
November 10	at Montana Agricultural	Bozeman, MT	T 5–5		
November 25	Utah	Logan, UT (Battle of the Brothers)	L 0–5 (forfeit)		
