= 1905 Colorado Silver and Gold football team =

American college football season

1905 Colorado Silver and Gold football
- Conference: Independent
- Record: 8–1
- Head coach: Willis Kienholz (1st season)
- Captain: Ray Roberts
- Home stadium: Gamble Field

1905 Far West college football independents records
	Conf.			Overall
Team	W	L	T	W		L		T
Stanford		–		8	–	0	–	0
Idaho		–		5	–	0	–	0
New Mexico A&M		–		3	–	0	–	0
Colorado		–		8	–	1	–	0
New Mexico		–		5	–	1	–	1
Utah		–		6	–	2	–	0
California		–		4	–	1	–	2
Oregon Agricultural		–		6	–	3	–	0
USC		–		6	–	3	–	1
Arizona		–		4	–	2	–	0
Oregon		–		4	–	2	–	2
Washington		–		4	–	2	–	2
Washington State		–		4	–	4	–	0
Utah Agricultural		–		2	–	2	–	1
Wyoming		–		3	–	4	–	0
Montana		–		2	–	3	–	0
Montana Agricultural		–		1	–	2	–	1
Nevada State		–		0	–	3	–	1
Tempe Normal		–		0	–	3	–	0

The 1905 Colorado Silver and Gold football team was an American football team that represented the University of Colorado as an independent during the 1905 college football season. Led by Willis Kienholz, in his first and only season as head coach, Colorado compiled a record of 8–1. The team left the Colorado Football Association (CFA), only to return the following season.

== Schedule ==
Date	Opponent	Site	Result	Attendance	Source
September 30	at North High School	Denver, CO	W 28–0		
October 7	at Regis	Denver, CO	W 109–0		
October 14	Colorado alumni	Gamble Field; Boulder, CO	W 23–0		
October 21	Wyoming	Gamble Field; Boulder, CO	W 69–0		
October 28	Kansas	Broadway Park; Denver, CO	W 15–0		
November 4	Utah	Gamble Field; Boulder, CO (rivalry)	W 46–5		
November 11	at Nebraska	Antelope Field; Lincoln, NE (rivalry)	L 0–18	7,000	
November 18	Washburn	Gamble Field; Boulder, CO	W 30–5		
November 30	vs. Haskell	Broadway Park; Denver, CO	W 39–0		
