= 1903 Stanford football team =

American college football season

1903 Stanford football
- Conference: Independent
- Record: 8–0–3
- Head coach: James F. Lanagan (1st season)

1903 Far West college football independents records
| | Conf. | | | Overall |
| Team | W | L | T | W | | L | | T |
|---|---|---|---|---|---|---|---|---|
| Stanford | | – | | 8 | – | 0 | – | 3 |
| Montana Agricultural | | – | | 1 | – | 0 | – | 1 |
| California | | – | | 6 | – | 1 | – | 2 |
| Washington | | – | | 6 | – | 1 | – | 0 |
| Oregon | | – | | 4 | – | 2 | – | 1 |
| USC | | – | | 4 | – | 2 | – | 0 |
| Albany College (OR) | | – | | 4 | – | 3 | – | 0 |
| Utah Agricultural | | – | | 3 | – | 0 | – | 0 |
| New Mexico A&M | | – | | 2 | – | 0 | – | 1 |
| Arizona | | – | | 2 | – | 0 | – | 0 |
| Tempe Normal | | – | | 2 | – | 0 | – | 0 |
| Idaho | | – | | 4 | – | 2 | – | 0 |
| Wyoming | | – | | 3 | – | 2 | – | 0 |
| Washington Agricultural | | – | | 3 | – | 3 | – | 2 |
| Utah | | – | | 3 | – | 5 | – | 0 |
| Nevada State | | – | | 2 | – | 4 | – | 2 |
| Oregon Agricultural | | – | | 2 | – | 4 | – | 1 |
| Montana | | – | | 2 | – | 5 | – | 0 |
| Academy of Idaho | | – | | 0 | – | 1 | – | 1 |

The 1903 Stanford football team represented Stanford University in the 1903 college football season and was coached by James F. Lanagan, a former Stanford baseball player, in his first season coaching the team.

== Schedule ==
| Date | Opponent | Site | Result | Source |
|---|---|---|---|---|
| September 19 | Reliance Athletic Club | Stanford, CA | T 0–0 | |
| September 26 | USS Pensacola | Stanford, CA | W 17–0 | |
| October 3 | Reliance Athletic Club | Stanford, CA | W 6–0 | |
| October 10 | USS Pensacola | Stanford, CA | W 34–0 | |
| October 15 | Fort Baker | Stanford, CA | W 57–0 | |
| October 24 | Nevada State | Stanford, CA | T 0–0 | |
| October 28 | Chemawa | Stanford, CA | W 33–0 | |
| October 31 | Reliance Athletic Club | Stanford, CA | W 17–0 | |
| November 7 | Multnomah Athletic Club | Stanford, CA | W 11–0 | |
| November 14 | vs. California | Richmond Grounds; San Francisco, CA (Big Game) | T 6–6 | |
| November 26 | vs. Sherman Institute | Prager Park; Los Angeles, CA | W 18–0 | |

== Game summaries ==
=== California ===
The 1903 Big Game was the last to be played on a neutral field in San Francisco. It ended in a 6–6 tie. Beginning with the 1904 Big Game, the game was alternated between the home field of each team.
