= 1903 Arizona football team =

American college football season

1903 Arizona football
- Conference: Independent
- Record: 2–0
- Head coach: Orin A. Kates (1st season)
- Captain: Leo Rosenberg

1903 Far West college football independents records
	Conf.			Overall
Team	W	L	T	W		L		T
Stanford		–		8	–	0	–	3
Montana Agricultural		–		1	–	0	–	1
California		–		6	–	1	–	2
Washington		–		6	–	1	–	0
Oregon		–		4	–	2	–	1
USC		–		4	–	2	–	0
Albany College (OR)		–		4	–	3	–	0
Utah Agricultural		–		3	–	0	–	0
New Mexico A&M		–		2	–	0	–	1
Arizona		–		2	–	0	–	0
Tempe Normal		–		2	–	0	–	0
Idaho		–		4	–	2	–	0
Wyoming		–		3	–	2	–	0
Washington Agricultural		–		3	–	3	–	2
Utah		–		3	–	5	–	0
Nevada State		–		2	–	4	–	2
Oregon Agricultural		–		2	–	4	–	1
Montana		–		2	–	5	–	0
Academy of Idaho		–		0	–	1	–	1

The 1903 Arizona football team was an American football team that represented the University of Arizona as an independent during the 1903 college football season. In their first season under head coach Orin A. Kates, the team played only two games, both against the Tucson Indian School. The university team won both games. The team captain was Leo Rosenberg.

With key players from the 1902 team lost to graduation, injury, or illness, interest in football apparently waned at the university in the fall of 1903. On October 25, 1903, The Arizona Daily Star noted the failure of students to organize a football team up to that point and urged the students to "ginger up" and organize a team. A team was ultimately organized and was known as the "preps" or the "University Prep. football team".

== Schedule ==
Date	Opponent	Site	Result	Source
	Tucson Indian School	Tucson, Arizona Territory	W 28–0	
November 26	Tucson Indian School	Tucson, Arizona Territory	W 21–11	
