= 1905 California Golden Bears football team =

American college football season

1905 California Golden Bears football
- Conference: Independent
- Record: 4–1–2
- Head coach: J. W. Knibbs (1st season)
- Captain: James A. Force
- Home stadium: California Field

1905 Far West college football independents records
| | Conf. | | | Overall |
| Team | W | L | T | W | | L | | T |
|---|---|---|---|---|---|---|---|---|
| Stanford | | – | | 8 | – | 0 | – | 0 |
| Idaho | | – | | 5 | – | 0 | – | 0 |
| New Mexico A&M | | – | | 3 | – | 0 | – | 0 |
| Colorado | | – | | 8 | – | 1 | – | 0 |
| New Mexico | | – | | 5 | – | 1 | – | 1 |
| Utah | | – | | 6 | – | 2 | – | 0 |
| California | | – | | 4 | – | 1 | – | 2 |
| Oregon Agricultural | | – | | 6 | – | 3 | – | 0 |
| USC | | – | | 6 | – | 3 | – | 1 |
| Arizona | | – | | 4 | – | 2 | – | 0 |
| Oregon | | – | | 4 | – | 2 | – | 2 |
| Washington | | – | | 4 | – | 2 | – | 2 |
| Washington State | | – | | 4 | – | 4 | – | 0 |
| Utah Agricultural | | – | | 2 | – | 2 | – | 1 |
| Wyoming | | – | | 3 | – | 4 | – | 0 |
| Montana | | – | | 2 | – | 3 | – | 0 |
| Montana Agricultural | | – | | 1 | – | 2 | – | 1 |
| Nevada State | | – | | 0 | – | 3 | – | 1 |
| Tempe Normal | | – | | 0 | – | 3 | – | 0 |

The 1905 California Golden Bears football team was an American football team that represented the University of California, Berkeley during the 1905 college football season. The team competed as an independent under head coach J. W. Knibbs and compiled a record of 4–1–2. This was Cal's last season of football until 1915, though rugby continued in this period.

== Schedule ==
| Date | Opponent | Site | Result | Source |
|---|---|---|---|---|
| September 30 | St. Vincent's (CA) | California Field; Berkeley, CA | W 23–0 | |
| October 7 | Willamette | California Field; Berkeley, CA | T 0–0 | |
| October 12 | Oregon | California Field; Berkeley, CA | T 0–0 | |
| October 21 | at Sherman Indians | Los Angeles, CA | W 21–0 | |
| October 28 | Oregon Agricultural | California Field; Berkeley, CA | W 10–0 | |
| November 4 | Nevada State | California Field; Berkeley, CA | W 16–0 | |
| November 11 | at Stanford | Stanford Field; Stanford, CA (Big Game) | L 5–12 | |
