= Idaho football, 1900–1909 =

American college football seasons

The Idaho football teams (later known as the Idaho Vandals) represented the University of Idaho in American football during the program's second decade from 1900 to 1909. From 1900 to 1907 Idaho competed as an independent and then as a member of the Northwest Conference for 1908 and 1909. Highlights include the following:

- In 1900, Idaho had its first undefeated season and finished with a record of 2–0–1.
- In 1905, Idaho had its first undefeated and untied season and finished with a record of 5–0.

== 1900 ==
1900 Idaho football
- Conference: Independent
- Record: 2–0–1
- Head coach: Fred Herbold (1st season)

1900 Far West college football independents records
	Conf.			Overall
Team	W	L	T	W		L		T
Washington Agricultural		–		4	–	0	–	1
Idaho		–		2	–	0	–	1
Arizona		–		3	–	1	–	0
Montana Agricultural		–		2	–	1	–	0
Stanford		–		7	–	2	–	1
Utah		–		2	–	1	–	0
California		–		4	–	2	–	1
Nevada State		–		4	–	2	–	1
Oregon		–		3	–	3	–	1
New Mexico A&M		–		3	–	3	–	1
San Jose Normal		–		3	–	3	–	1
Arizona Normal		–		1	–	1	–	0
USC		–		1	–	1	–	1
Wyoming		–		3	–	3	–	0
Washington		–		1	–	2	–	2
Montana		–		0	–	1	–	0
Utah Agricultural		–		0	–	2	–	0

The 1900 Idaho football team represented the University of Idaho during the 1900 college football season. Under first-year head coach Fred Herbold, Idaho finished with a record of 2–0–1.

=== Schedule ===
Date	Opponent	Site	Result	Attendance	Source
October 19	Lewiston Normal	Moscow, ID	W 17–0		
October 27	vs. Washington	Natatorium Park; Spokane, WA	W 12–6	1,000	
November 17	Lewiston Athletic Club	Moscow, ID	T 0–0		

External link

- The University Argonaut – student newspaper – 1900 editions

== 1901 ==
1901 Idaho football
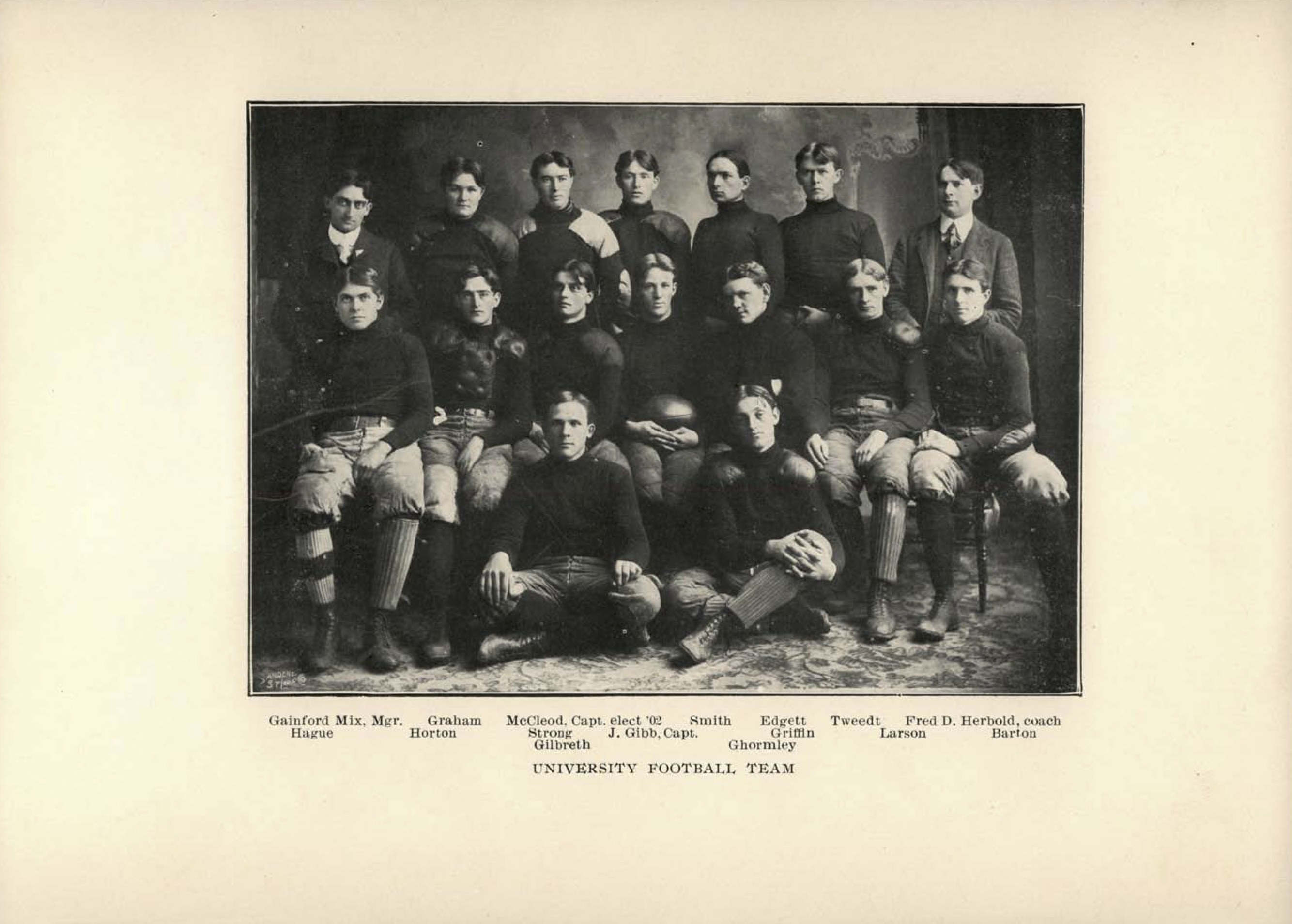
- Conference: Independent
- Record: 3–2–1
- Head coach: Fred Herbold (2nd season)
- Captain: J. A. Gibb

1901 Far West college football independents records
	Conf.			Overall
Team	W	L	T	W		L		T
Wyoming		–		1	–	0	–	0
California		–		9	–	0	–	1
Arizona		–		4	–	1	–	0
Washington Agricultural		–		4	–	1	–	0
Utah		–		3	–	1	–	0
Montana Agricultural		–		2	–	1	–	0
New Mexico A&M		–		2	–	1	–	0
Utah Agricultural		–		3	–	2	–	0
Stanford		–		3	–	2	–	2
Idaho		–		3	–	2	–	1
Washington		–		3	–	3	–	0
Nevada State		–		3	–	3	–	0
Oregon		–		3	–	4	–	1
Montana		–		2	–	3	–	0
Cheney Normal		–		1	–	2	–	0
Oregon Agricultural		–		1	–	2	–	0
New Mexico		–		0	–	3	–	1
USC		–		0	–	2	–	0

The 1901 Idaho football team represented the University of Idaho during the 1901 college football season. Under second-year head coach Fred Herbold, Idaho finished with a record of 3–2–1.

=== Schedule ===
Date	Opponent	Site	Result	Attendance	Source
October 19	Lewiston Normal	Moscow, ID	W 11–6		
October 25	Washington Agricultural	Moscow, ID (rivalry)	W 5–0		
November 6	Oregon	Moscow, ID	T 0–0		
November 20	Whitman	Moscow, ID	L 0–10		
November 28	at Washington	Athletic Park; Seattle, WA	L 0–10	2,000	
December 13	at Lewiston Normal	Lewiston, ID	W 22–0		

External link

- The University Argonaut – student newspaper – 1901 editions

== 1902 ==
1902 Idaho football
- Conference: Northwest Intercollegiate Athletic Association
- Record: 1–3–1 (0–3–0 NIAA)
- Head coach: John G. Griffith (1st season)

1902 Northwest Intercollegiate Athletic Association football standings
	Conf.					Overall
Team	W		L		T	W		L		T
Washington $	4	–	0	–	0	5	–	1	–	0
Oregon	2	–	0	–	1	3	–	1	–	3
Montana Agricultural	1	–	0	–	0	4	–	0	–	1
Washington State	2	–	1	–	0	2	–	3	–	0
Oregon Agricultural	1	–	1	–	1	4	–	1	–	1
Montana	0	–	1	–	0	0	–	2	–	0
Whitman	1	–	3	–	0	2	–	4	–	0
Idaho	0	–	3	–	0	1	–	3	–	1
Pacific (OR)	—	–	—	–	—	—	–	—	–	—
$ – Conference champion

The 1902 Idaho football team represented the University of Idaho during the 1902 college football season. Under first-year head coach John G. Griffith, Idaho finished with a record of 1–3–1.

=== Schedule ===
Date	Opponent	Site	Result	Attendance	Source
October 4	Lewiston Normal	Moscow, ID	T 0–0		
October 13	Pacific (OR)	Moscow, ID	W 23–0		
October 24	at Washington Agricultural	Rogers Field; Pullman, WA (rivalry)	L 0–17		
November 3	Washington	Moscow, ID	L 0–10	500	
November 27	at Whitman	Walla Walla, WA	L 0–16		

External link

- The University Argonaut – student newspaper – 1902 editions

== 1903 ==
1903 Idaho football
- Conference: Independent
- Record: 4–2
- Head coach: John G. Griffith (2nd season)

1903 Far West college football independents records
	Conf.			Overall
Team	W	L	T	W		L		T
Stanford		–		8	–	0	–	3
Montana Agricultural		–		1	–	0	–	1
California		–		6	–	1	–	2
Washington		–		6	–	1	–	0
Oregon		–		4	–	2	–	1
USC		–		4	–	2	–	0
Albany College (OR)		–		4	–	3	–	0
Utah Agricultural		–		3	–	0	–	0
New Mexico A&M		–		2	–	0	–	1
Arizona		–		2	–	0	–	0
Tempe Normal		–		2	–	0	–	0
Idaho		–		4	–	2	–	0
Wyoming		–		3	–	2	–	0
Cheney Normal		–		3	–	2	–	2
Washington Agricultural		–		3	–	3	–	2
Utah		–		3	–	5	–	0
Nevada State		–		2	–	4	–	2
Oregon Agricultural		–		2	–	4	–	1
Montana		–		2	–	5	–	0
Academy of Idaho		–		0	–	1	–	1

The 1903 Idaho football team represented the University of Idaho during the 1903 college football season. Under second-year head coach John G. Griffith, Idaho finished with a record of 4–2.

=== Schedule ===
Date	Opponent	Site	Result	Source
October 10	Lewiston Normal	Moscow, ID	W 35–0	
October 16	Puget Sound	Moscow, ID	L 0–11	
October 23	Washington Agricultural	Moscow, ID (rivalry)	W 32–0	
November 13	Whitman	Moscow, ID	W 36–0	
November 18	Montana	Moscow, ID (rivalry)	W 28–0	
November 26	at Washington	Athletic Park; Seattle, WA	L 0–5	

External link

- The University Argonaut – student newspaper – 1903 editions

== 1904 ==
1904 Idaho football
- Conference: Independent
- Record: 2–1
- Head coach: John G. Griffith (3rd season)

1904 Far West college football independents records
	Conf.			Overall
Team	W	L	T	W		L		T
Utah		–		7	–	1	–	0
Stanford		–		7	–	2	–	1
California		–		6	–	1	–	1
USC		–		6	–	1	–	0
Idaho		–		2	–	1	–	0
Montana Agricultural		–		2	–	1	–	0
Oregon		–		5	–	3	–	0
Tempe Normal		–		4	–	0	–	0
Wyoming		–		4	–	1	–	1
Washington		–		4	–	2	–	1
Arizona		–		3	–	1	–	2
Oregon Agricultural		–		4	–	2	–	0
Montana		–		3	–	2	–	0
Nevada State		–		3	–	3	–	0
Washington Agricultural		–		2	–	2	–	0
Whitman		–		2	–	3	–	0
New Mexico A&M		–		1	–	2	–	1
Utah Agricultural		–		4	–	8	–	0
Cheney Normal		–		1	–	6	–	0

The 1904 Idaho football team represented the University of Idaho during the 1904 college football season. Under third-year head coach John G. Griffith, Idaho finished with a record of 2–1.

=== Schedule ===
Date	Opponent	Site	Result	Attendance	Source
October 21	at Washington Agricultural	Rogers Field; Pullman, WA (rivalry)	W 5–0	1,500	
November 5	at Washington	Madison Park; Seattle, WA	L 10–12		
November 11	at Whitman	Walla Walla, WA	W 21–0		

External link

- The University Argonaut – student newspaper – 1904 editions

== 1905 ==
1905 Idaho football
- Conference: Independent
- Record: 5–0
- Head coach: John G. Griffith (4th season)

1905 Far West college football independents records
	Conf.			Overall
Team	W	L	T	W		L		T
Stanford		–		8	–	0	–	0
Idaho		–		5	–	0	–	0
New Mexico A&M		–		3	–	0	–	0
Colorado		–		8	–	1	–	0
New Mexico		–		5	–	1	–	1
Utah		–		6	–	2	–	0
California		–		4	–	1	–	2
Oregon Agricultural		–		6	–	3	–	0
USC		–		6	–	3	–	1
Arizona		–		4	–	2	–	0
Oregon		–		4	–	2	–	2
Washington		–		4	–	2	–	2
Cheney Normal		–		4	–	3	–	0
Washington State		–		4	–	4	–	0
Utah Agricultural		–		2	–	2	–	1
Wyoming		–		3	–	4	–	0
Montana		–		2	–	3	–	0
Montana Agricultural		–		1	–	2	–	1
Nevada State		–		0	–	3	–	1
Colorado State Normal		–		0	–	2	–	0
Tempe Normal		–		0	–	3	–	0

The 1905 Idaho football team represented the University of Idaho during the 1905 college football season. Under fourth-year head coach John G. Griffith, Idaho finished with a record of 5–0.

=== Schedule ===
Date	Opponent	Site	Result	Attendance	Source
September 30	Lewiston High School (ID)	Moscow, ID	W 41–2		
October 9	Montana Agricultural	Moscow, ID	W 50–0		
October 30	Washington	Moscow, ID	W 8–0	1,000	
November 10	Washington State	Moscow, ID (rivalry)	W 5–0	5,000	
November 18	Whitman	Moscow, ID	W 9–0		

External link

- The University Argonaut – student newspaper – 1905 editions

== 1906 ==
1906 Idaho football
- Conference: Independent
- Record: 2–4
- Head coach: John G. Griffith (5th season)

1906 Western college football independents records
	Conf.			Overall
Team	W	L	T	W		L		T
Washington State		–		6	–	0	–	0
New Mexico A&M		–		4	–	0	–	0
Oregon		–		5	–	0	–	1
Colorado Mines		–		3	–	0	–	2
Utah		–		4	–	1	–	0
New Mexico		–		3	–	1	–	0
USC		–		2	–	0	–	2
Utah Agricultural		–		3	–	1	–	0
Oregon Agricultural		–		4	–	1	–	2
Washington		–		4	–	1	–	4
Cheney Normal		–		5	–	3	–	0
Wyoming		–		1	–	1	–	0
Idaho		–		2	–	4	–	0
Montana		–		2	–	4	–	0
Tempe Normal		–		0	–	2	–	0

The 1906 Idaho football team represented the University of Idaho during the 1906 college football season. Under fifth-year head coach John G. Griffith, Idaho finished with a record of 2–4.

=== Schedule ===
Date	Opponent	Site	Result	Attendance	Source
October 13	Spokane Athletic Club	Moscow, ID	W 10–5		
October 20	Coeur d'Alene High School	Moscow, ID	W 23–0		
October 26	Oregon	Moscow, ID	L 0–12		
November 9	at Washington State	Rogers Field; Pullman, WA (rivalry)	L 0–10		
November 17	at Whitman	Walla Walla, WA	L 5–6		
November 29	at Washington	Denny Field; Seattle, WA	L 9–16	3,500	

External link

- The University Argonaut – student newspaper – 1906 editions

== 1907 ==
1907 Idaho football
- Conference: Independent
- Record: 3–1–2
- Head coach: John R. Middleton (1st season)

1907 Western college football independents records
	Conf.			Overall
Team	W	L	T	W		L		T
Oregon Agricultural		–		6	–	0	–	0
New Mexico A&M		–		3	–	0	–	0
New Mexico		–		1	–	0	–	0
Washington State		–		7	–	1	–	0
Colorado Mines		–		5	–	1	–	0
Oregon		–		5	–	1	–	0
USC		–		5	–	1	–	0
Utah Agricultural		–		5	–	1	–	0
Idaho		–		3	–	1	–	2
Montana		–		4	–	1	–	1
Utah		–		4	–	2	–	0
Cheney Normal		–		3	–	2	–	0
Wyoming		–		2	–	1	–	0
Gonzaga		–		0	–	0	–	1
Washington		–		4	–	4	–	2

The 1907 Idaho football team represented the University of Idaho during the 1907 college football season. Under first-year head coach John R. Middleton, Idaho finished with a record of 3–1–2.

=== Schedule ===
Date	Opponent	Site	Result	Attendance	Source
October 5	Spokane High School	Moscow, ID	T 0–0		
October 19	Spokane Athletic Club	Moscow, ID	W 22–0		
October 26	vs. Oregon	Portland, OR	L 5–21		
November 8	Washington State	Moscow, ID (rivalry)	W 5–4	2,000	
November 16	Whitman	Moscow, ID	W 11–0	2,000	
November 28	at Washington	Denny Field; Seattle, WA	T 0–0	3,000	

External link

- The University Argonaut – student newspaper – 1907 editions
