= 1905 Oregon Webfoots football team =

American college football season

1905 Oregon Webfoots football
- Conference: Independent
- Record: 4–2–2
- Head coach: Bruce Shorts (1st season)
- Captain: Jack Latourette
- Home stadium: Kincaid Field

1905 Far West college football independents records
	Conf.			Overall
Team	W	L	T	W		L		T
Stanford		–		8	–	0	–	0
Idaho		–		5	–	0	–	0
New Mexico A&M		–		3	–	0	–	0
Colorado		–		8	–	1	–	0
New Mexico		–		5	–	1	–	1
Utah		–		6	–	2	–	0
California		–		4	–	1	–	2
Oregon Agricultural		–		6	–	3	–	0
USC		–		6	–	3	–	1
Arizona		–		4	–	2	–	0
Oregon		–		4	–	2	–	2
Washington		–		4	–	2	–	2
Washington State		–		4	–	4	–	0
Utah Agricultural		–		2	–	2	–	1
Wyoming		–		3	–	4	–	0
Montana		–		2	–	3	–	0
Montana Agricultural		–		1	–	2	–	1
Nevada State		–		0	–	3	–	1
Tempe Normal		–		0	–	3	–	0

The 1905 Oregon Webfoots football team represented the University of Oregon in the 1905 college football season. It was the Webfoots' 12th season; they competed as an independent and were led by head coach Bruce Shorts. They finished the season with a record of four wins, two losses and two ties (4–2–2).

== Schedule ==
Date	Opponent	Site	Result	Attendance	Source
October 8	vs. Oregon alumni	Eugene, OR	W 15–5		
October 12	at California	California Field; Berkeley, CA	T 0–0		
October 17	at Stanford	Stanford Field; Stanford, CA	L 4–10		
October 28	Chemawa	Kincaid Field; Eugene, OR	W 17–0		
November 4	at Willamette	Salem, OR	W 11–6		
November 11	Oregon Agricultural	Kincaid Field; Eugene, OR (rivalry)	W 6–0		
November 18	at Washington	Denny Field; Seattle, WA (rivalry)	T 12–12	2,000	
November 30	at Multnomah Amateur Athletic Club	Multnomah Field; Portland, OR	L 0–6		
