= 1903 USC Methodists football team =

American college football season

1903 USC Methodists football
- Conference: Independent
- Record: 4–2
- Head coach: John Walker (1st season)
- Captain: Dan Caley
- Home stadium: Prager Park

1903 Far West college football independents records
	Conf.			Overall
Team	W	L	T	W		L		T
Stanford		–		8	–	0	–	3
Montana Agricultural		–		1	–	0	–	1
California		–		6	–	1	–	2
Washington		–		6	–	1	–	0
Oregon		–		4	–	2	–	1
USC		–		4	–	2	–	0
Albany College (OR)		–		4	–	3	–	0
Utah Agricultural		–		3	–	0	–	0
New Mexico A&M		–		2	–	0	–	1
Arizona		–		2	–	0	–	0
Tempe Normal		–		2	–	0	–	0
Idaho		–		4	–	2	–	0
Wyoming		–		3	–	2	–	0
Washington Agricultural		–		3	–	3	–	2
Utah		–		3	–	5	–	0
Nevada State		–		2	–	4	–	2
Oregon Agricultural		–		2	–	4	–	1
Montana		–		2	–	5	–	0
Academy of Idaho		–		0	–	1	–	1

The 1903 USC Methodists football team was an American football team that represented the University of Southern California during the 1903 college football season. The team competed as an independent under head coach John Walker, compiling a 4–2 record.

== Schedule ==
Date	Opponent	Site	Result	Attendance
October 10	Throop	Prager Park; Los Angeles, CA	W 5–0	500
October 17	Los Angeles High School	Prager Park; Los Angeles, CA	W 10–0	500
October 24	Occidental	Prager Park; Los Angeles, CA	L 0–5	600
October 31	St. Vincent's (CA)	Prager Park; Los Angeles, CA	W 12–5	
November 7	Orange AC	Prager Park; Los Angeles, CA	W 31–5	
November 14	Sherman Institute	Prager Park; Los Angeles, CA	L 0–12	
