= 1903 Tempe Normal Owls football team =

American college football season

1903 Tempe Normal Owls football
- Conference: Independent
- Record: 2–0
- Head coach: Frederick M. Irish (5th season)
- Home stadium: Normal Field

1903 Far West college football independents records
	Conf.			Overall
Team	W	L	T	W		L		T
Stanford		–		8	–	0	–	3
Montana Agricultural		–		1	–	0	–	1
California		–		6	–	1	–	2
Washington		–		6	–	1	–	0
Oregon		–		4	–	2	–	1
USC		–		4	–	2	–	0
Albany College (OR)		–		4	–	3	–	0
Utah Agricultural		–		3	–	0	–	0
New Mexico A&M		–		2	–	0	–	1
Arizona		–		2	–	0	–	0
Tempe Normal		–		2	–	0	–	0
Idaho		–		4	–	2	–	0
Wyoming		–		3	–	2	–	0
Washington Agricultural		–		3	–	3	–	2
Utah		–		3	–	5	–	0
Nevada State		–		2	–	4	–	2
Oregon Agricultural		–		2	–	4	–	1
Montana		–		2	–	5	–	0
Academy of Idaho		–		0	–	1	–	1

The 1903 Tempe Normal Owls football team was an American football team that represented Tempe Normal School (later renamed Arizona State University) as an independent during the 1903 college football season. In their fifth season under head coach Frederick M. Irish, the Owls compiled a 2–0 record, shut out both opponents, and outscored their opponents by a combined total of 33 to 0. The team won games against the Phoenix High School (18–0) and the Phoenix Indians (15–0).

== Schedule ==
Opponent	Site	Result
at Phoenix High School	Phoenix, Arizona Territory	W 18–0
Phoenix Indian School	Normal Field; Tempe, Arizona Territory	W 15–0
