= 1905 Arizona football team =

American college football season

1905 Arizona football

Arizona Territory champion
- Conference: Independent
- Record: 4–2
- Head coach: William M. Ruthrauff (1st season)
- Captain: John M. Ruthrauff

1905 Far West college football independents records
	Conf.			Overall
Team	W	L	T	W		L		T
Stanford		–		8	–	0	–	0
Idaho		–		5	–	0	–	0
New Mexico A&M		–		3	–	0	–	0
Colorado		–		8	–	1	–	0
New Mexico		–		5	–	1	–	1
Utah		–		6	–	2	–	0
California		–		4	–	1	–	2
Oregon Agricultural		–		6	–	3	–	0
USC		–		6	–	3	–	1
Arizona		–		4	–	2	–	0
Oregon		–		4	–	2	–	2
Washington		–		4	–	2	–	2
Washington State		–		4	–	4	–	0
Utah Agricultural		–		2	–	2	–	1
Wyoming		–		3	–	4	–	0
Montana		–		2	–	3	–	0
Montana Agricultural		–		1	–	2	–	1
Nevada State		–		0	–	3	–	1
Tempe Normal		–		0	–	3	–	0

The 1905 Arizona football team was an American football team that represented the University of Arizona as an independent during the 1905 college football season. In its first and only season under head coach William M. Ruthrauff, the team compiled a 4–2 record and shut out its first four opponents, but were then outscored by two California colleges, 96 to 5. The team captain was John M. Ruthrauff. The team was declared the Arizona Territory champion.

== Schedule ==
Date	Opponent	Site	Result	Source
October 21	Tombstone	Tucson, Arizona Territory	W 17–0	
October 28	Tucson Indian School (Seniors)	Tucson, Arizona Territory	W 17–0	
October 28	Tucson Indian School (Juniors)	Tucson, Arizona Territory	W 6–0	
November 4	Phoenix Indian School	Tucson, Arizona Territory	W 34–0	
November 11	at Pomona	Fiesta Park; Los Angeles, CA	L 5–41	
November 18	at St. Vincent's	Fiesta Park; Los Angeles, CA	L 0–55	
