= 1903 California Golden Bears football team =

American college football season

1903 California Golden Bears football
- Conference: Independent
- Record: 6–1–2
- Head coach: James Whipple (2nd season)
- Captain: Orval Overall

1903 Far West college football independents records
| | Conf. | | | Overall |
| Team | W | L | T | W | | L | | T |
|---|---|---|---|---|---|---|---|---|
| Stanford | | – | | 8 | – | 0 | – | 3 |
| Montana Agricultural | | – | | 1 | – | 0 | – | 1 |
| California | | – | | 6 | – | 1 | – | 2 |
| Washington | | – | | 6 | – | 1 | – | 0 |
| Oregon | | – | | 4 | – | 2 | – | 1 |
| USC | | – | | 4 | – | 2 | – | 0 |
| Albany College (OR) | | – | | 4 | – | 3 | – | 0 |
| Utah Agricultural | | – | | 3 | – | 0 | – | 0 |
| New Mexico A&M | | – | | 2 | – | 0 | – | 1 |
| Arizona | | – | | 2 | – | 0 | – | 0 |
| Tempe Normal | | – | | 2 | – | 0 | – | 0 |
| Idaho | | – | | 4 | – | 2 | – | 0 |
| Wyoming | | – | | 3 | – | 2 | – | 0 |
| Cheney Normal | | – | | 3 | – | 2 | – | 2 |
| Washington Agricultural | | – | | 3 | – | 3 | – | 2 |
| Utah | | – | | 3 | – | 5 | – | 0 |
| Nevada State | | – | | 2 | – | 4 | – | 2 |
| Oregon Agricultural | | – | | 2 | – | 4 | – | 1 |
| Montana | | – | | 2 | – | 5 | – | 0 |
| Academy of Idaho | | – | | 0 | – | 1 | – | 1 |

The 1903 California Golden Bears football team was an American football team that represented the University of California, Berkeley during the 1903 college football season. The team competed as an independent under head coach James Whipple and compiled a record of 6–1–2.

== Schedule ==
| Date | Opponent | Site | Result | Attendance | Source |
|---|---|---|---|---|---|
| September 26 | Reliance Athletic Club | Berkeley, CA | T 0–0 | | |
| October 3 | Navy Hospital Corps | Berkeley, CA | W 51–0 | | |
| October 10 | Reliance Athletic Club | Berkeley, CA | W 7–0 | | |
| October 14 | Reliance Athletic Club | Berkeley, CA | W 5–0 | | |
| October 24 | Chemawa | Berkeley, CA | W 40–0 | | |
| October 28 | Reliance Athletic Club | Berkeley, CA | W 6–0 | | |
| October 31 | Multnomah Athletic Club | Berkeley, CA | W 11–0 | | |
| November 7 | Nevada State | Berkeley, CA | L 2–6 | | |
| November 14 | vs. Stanford | Recreation Park; San Francisco, CA (Big Game) | T 6–6 | 14,600 | |
