= 1905 Washington football team =

American college football season

1905 Washington football
- Conference: Independent
- Record: 4–2–2
- Head coach: Oliver Cutts (1st season)
- Captain: Tom McDonald
- Home stadium: Recreation Park

1905 Far West college football independents records
	Conf.			Overall
Team	W	L	T	W		L		T
Stanford		–		8	–	0	–	0
Idaho		–		5	–	0	–	0
New Mexico A&M		–		3	–	0	–	0
Colorado		–		8	–	1	–	0
New Mexico		–		5	–	1	–	1
Utah		–		6	–	2	–	0
California		–		4	–	1	–	2
Oregon Agricultural		–		6	–	3	–	0
USC		–		6	–	3	–	1
Arizona		–		4	–	2	–	0
Oregon		–		4	–	2	–	2
Washington		–		4	–	2	–	2
Washington State		–		4	–	4	–	0
Utah Agricultural		–		2	–	2	–	1
Wyoming		–		3	–	4	–	0
Montana		–		2	–	3	–	0
Montana Agricultural		–		1	–	2	–	1
Nevada State		–		0	–	3	–	1
Tempe Normal		–		0	–	3	–	0

The 1905 Washington football team was an American football team that represented the University of Washington as an independent during the 1905 college football season. In its first and only season under head coach Oliver Cutts, the team compiled a 4–2–2 record. Tom McDonald was the team captain.

== Schedule ==
Date	Time	Opponent	Site	Result	Attendance	Source
September 30		Seattle High School	Denny Field; Seattle, WA	W 17–0 (practice)	>1,000	
October 4	3:30 p.m.	USS Chicago	Denny Field; Seattle, WA	W 11–0 (practice)	1,500	
October 7	3:00 p.m.	at Whitworth	Eleventh Street Grounds; Tacoma, WA	W 18–5	1,000	
October 14		Whitman	Recreation Park; Seattle, WA	T 6–6	2,000	
October 21	3:00 p.m.	Chemawa	Recreation Park; Seattle, WA	W 11–6	1,000	
October 30		at Idaho	Moscow, ID	L 0–8	1,000	
November 11		Sherman Institute	Recreation Park; Seattle, WA	W 29–0	2,000–5,000	
November 18		Oregon	Recreation Park; Seattle, WA (rivalry)	T 12–12	2,000	
November 30		Oregon Agricultural	Recreation Park; Seattle, WA	L 0–16	3,000	
