= 1903 New Mexico A&M Aggies football team =

American college football season

1903 New Mexico A&M Aggies football
- Conference: Independent
- Record: 2–0–1
- Head coach: John O. Miller (4th season)
- Home stadium: College Field

1903 Far West college football independents records
	Conf.			Overall
Team	W	L	T	W		L		T
Stanford		–		8	–	0	–	3
Montana Agricultural		–		1	–	0	–	1
California		–		6	–	1	–	2
Washington		–		6	–	1	–	0
Oregon		–		4	–	2	–	1
USC		–		4	–	2	–	0
Albany College (OR)		–		4	–	3	–	0
Utah Agricultural		–		3	–	0	–	0
New Mexico A&M		–		2	–	0	–	1
Arizona		–		2	–	0	–	0
Tempe Normal		–		2	–	0	–	0
Idaho		–		4	–	2	–	0
Wyoming		–		3	–	2	–	0
Washington Agricultural		–		3	–	3	–	2
Utah		–		3	–	5	–	0
Nevada State		–		2	–	4	–	2
Oregon Agricultural		–		2	–	4	–	1
Montana		–		2	–	5	–	0
Academy of Idaho		–		0	–	1	–	1

The 1903 New Mexico A&M Aggies football team was an American football team that represented New Mexico College of Agriculture and Mechanical Arts (now known as New Mexico State University) as an independent during the 1903 college football season. In their fourth year under head coach John O. Miller, the Aggies compiled a 2–0–1 record and outscored opponents by a total of 34 to 0. The team played home games on College Field, later renamed Miller Field in honor of coach Miller.

== Schedule ==
Date	Opponent	Site	Result	Source
	Las Cruces	Las Cruces, NM	W 23–0	
	Santa Fe Indian School	Las Cruces, NM	T 0–0	
	El Paso Athletics	Las Cruces, NM	W 11–0	
