= 1903 Wyoming Cowboys football team =

American college football season

1903 Wyoming Cowboys football
- Conference: Independent
- Record: 3–2
- Head coach: William McMurray (4th season)
- Captain: Julius Merz

1903 Far West college football independents records
	Conf.			Overall
Team	W	L	T	W		L		T
Stanford		–		8	–	0	–	3
Montana Agricultural		–		1	–	0	–	1
California		–		6	–	1	–	2
Washington		–		6	–	1	–	0
Oregon		–		4	–	2	–	1
USC		–		4	–	2	–	0
Albany College (OR)		–		4	–	3	–	0
Utah Agricultural		–		3	–	0	–	0
New Mexico A&M		–		2	–	0	–	1
Arizona		–		2	–	0	–	0
Tempe Normal		–		2	–	0	–	0
Idaho		–		4	–	2	–	0
Wyoming		–		3	–	2	–	0
Washington Agricultural		–		3	–	3	–	2
Utah		–		3	–	5	–	0
Nevada State		–		2	–	4	–	2
Oregon Agricultural		–		2	–	4	–	1
Montana		–		2	–	5	–	0
Academy of Idaho		–		0	–	1	–	1

The 1903 Wyoming Cowboys football team represented the University of Wyoming as an independent during the 1903 college football season. In its fourth season under head coach William McMurray, the team compiled a 3–2 record and was outscored by a total of 63 to 32. Julius Merz was the team captain.

== Schedule ==
Date	Opponent	Site	Result	Source
October 16	Laramie High School	Laramie, WY	W 15–0	
October 24	Laramie Athletic Club	Laramie, WY	W 6–0	
November 14	at Colorado Agricultural	Fort Collins, CO (rivalry)	L 0–17	
November 21	at Utah Agricultural	Logan, UT (rivalry)	L 0–46	
November 26	Laramie Athletic Club	Laramie, WY	W 11–0	
