= 1905 Tempe Normal Owls football team =

American college football season

1905 Tempe Normal Owls football
- Conference: Independent
- Record: 0–3
- Head coach: Frederick M. Irish (7th season)
- Home stadium: Normal Field

1905 Far West college football independents records
	Conf.			Overall
Team	W	L	T	W		L		T
Stanford		–		8	–	0	–	0
Idaho		–		5	–	0	–	0
New Mexico A&M		–		3	–	0	–	0
Colorado		–		8	–	1	–	0
New Mexico		–		5	–	1	–	1
Utah		–		6	–	2	–	0
California		–		4	–	1	–	2
Oregon Agricultural		–		6	–	3	–	0
USC		–		6	–	3	–	1
Arizona		–		4	–	2	–	0
Oregon		–		4	–	2	–	2
Washington		–		4	–	2	–	2
Washington State		–		4	–	4	–	0
Utah Agricultural		–		2	–	2	–	1
Wyoming		–		3	–	4	–	0
Montana		–		2	–	3	–	0
Montana Agricultural		–		1	–	2	–	1
Nevada State		–		0	–	3	–	1
Tempe Normal		–		0	–	3	–	0

The 1905 Tempe Normal Owls football team was an American football team that represented Tempe Normal School (later renamed Arizona State University) as an independent during the 1905 college football season. In their seventh season under head coach Frederick M. Irish, the Owls compiled a 0–3 record and were outscored by their opponents by a combined total of 28 to 8.

== Schedule ==
Opponent	Site	Result
Phoenix Indian School	Normal Field; Tempe, Arizona Territory	L 8–17
Phoenix High School	Normal Field; Tempe, Arizona Territory	L 0–5
Tempe High School	Normal Field; Tempe, Arizona Territory	L 0–6
