= 1903 University of Utah football team =

American college football season

1903 University of Utah football
- Conference: Independent
- Record: 3–5
- Head coach: Harvey Holmes (4th season)
- Captain: Jimmy Wade
- Home stadium: Cummings Field

1903 Far West college football independents records
	Conf.			Overall
Team	W	L	T	W		L		T
Stanford		–		8	–	0	–	3
Montana Agricultural		–		1	–	0	–	1
California		–		6	–	1	–	2
Washington		–		6	–	1	–	0
Oregon		–		4	–	2	–	1
USC		–		4	–	2	–	0
Albany College (OR)		–		4	–	3	–	0
Utah Agricultural		–		3	–	0	–	0
New Mexico A&M		–		2	–	0	–	1
Arizona		–		2	–	0	–	0
Tempe Normal		–		2	–	0	–	0
Idaho		–		4	–	2	–	0
Wyoming		–		3	–	2	–	0
Washington Agricultural		–		3	–	3	–	2
Utah		–		3	–	5	–	0
Nevada State		–		2	–	4	–	2
Oregon Agricultural		–		2	–	4	–	1
Montana		–		2	–	5	–	0
Academy of Idaho		–		0	–	1	–	1

The 1903 University of Utah football team was an American football team that represented the University of Utah as an independent during the 1903 college football season. In its fourth and final season under head coach Harvey Holmes, the team compiled a 3–5 record and outscored opponents by a total of 125 to 87. Quarterback Jimmy Wade was the team captain.

== Schedule ==
Date	Time	Opponent	Site	Result	Attendance	Source
September 26		at Ogden High School	Ogden, UT	W 11–0		
October 3		at Colorado	Gamble Field; Boulder, CO (rivalry)	L 0–22		
October 10		Fort Douglas	Cummings Field; Salt Lake City, UT	W 63–0		
October 17		at Utah Agricultural	Utah A.C. quad; Logan, UT (rivalry)	L 0–17	2,000	
October 31		Denver	Cummings Field; Salt Lake City, UT	L 0–10		
November 14		12th Infantry	Cummings Field; Salt Lake City, UT	W 46–0		
November 26		Colorado Agricultural	Cummings Field; Salt Lake City, UT	L 6–16		
December 19	3:00 p.m.	Carlisle	Cummings Field; Salt Lake City, UT	L 0–22	1,000	
