= 1905 Stanford football team =

American college football season

1905 Stanford football
- Conference: Independent
- Record: 8–0
- Head coach: James F. Lanagan (3rd season)
- Home stadium: Stanford Field

1905 Far West college football independents records
	Conf.			Overall
Team	W	L	T	W		L		T
Stanford		–		8	–	0	–	0
Idaho		–		5	–	0	–	0
New Mexico A&M		–		3	–	0	–	0
Colorado		–		8	–	1	–	0
New Mexico		–		5	–	1	–	1
Utah		–		6	–	2	–	0
California		–		4	–	1	–	2
Oregon Agricultural		–		6	–	3	–	0
USC		–		6	–	3	–	1
Arizona		–		4	–	2	–	0
Oregon		–		4	–	2	–	2
Washington		–		4	–	2	–	2
Washington State		–		4	–	4	–	0
Utah Agricultural		–		2	–	2	–	1
Wyoming		–		3	–	4	–	0
Montana		–		2	–	3	–	0
Montana Agricultural		–		1	–	2	–	1
Nevada State		–		0	–	3	–	1
Tempe Normal		–		0	–	3	–	0

The 1905 Stanford football team represented Stanford University in the 1905 college football season. In head coach James F. Lanagan's third season, Stanford went undefeated. The team played their home games at Stanford Field in Stanford, California.

The 1905 season marked the first meeting between Stanford and USC. Consequently, Stanford is USC's oldest existing rival.

The Big Game between Stanford and Cal on November 11, 1905, was the first played at Stanford Field, with Stanford winning 12–5.

Following the 1905 season, Stanford, responding like other American universities to concerns about the violence in football, dropped football in favor of rugby. Despite having no knowledge of the sport, Lanagan was retained as the rugby coach, spending time in Vancouver, British Columbia, to study the sport, and coached for three seasons. He also served as Stanford's baseball coach from 1906 to 1907.

Stanford would not play varsity football again until the 1919 season.

== Schedule ==
Date	Opponent	Site	Result	Source
September 23	St. Vincent's (CA)	Stanford Field; Stanford, CA	W 10–0	
September 30	Willamette	Stanford Field; Stanford, CA	W 12–0	
October 7	15th Infantry	Stanford Field; Stanford, CA	W 51–0	
October 17	Oregon	Stanford Field; Stanford, CA	W 10–4	
October 21	Nevada State	Stanford Field; Stanford, CA	W 21–0	
October 28	vs. Sherman Institute	Fiesta Park; Los Angeles, CA	W 6–4	
November 4	USC	Stanford Field; Stanford, CA (rivalry)	W 16–0	
November 11	California	Stanford Field; Stanford, CA (Big Game)	W 12–5	
