= 1905 USC Methodists football team =

American college football season

1905 USC Methodists football
- Conference: Independent
- Record: 6–3–1
- Head coach: Harvey Holmes (2nd season)
- Captain: Carl Elliott
- Home stadium: Bovard Field

1905 Far West college football independents records
| | Conf. | | | Overall |
| Team | W | L | T | W | | L | | T |
|---|---|---|---|---|---|---|---|---|
| Stanford | | – | | 8 | – | 0 | – | 0 |
| Idaho | | – | | 5 | – | 0 | – | 0 |
| New Mexico A&M | | – | | 3 | – | 0 | – | 0 |
| Colorado | | – | | 8 | – | 1 | – | 0 |
| New Mexico | | – | | 5 | – | 1 | – | 1 |
| Utah | | – | | 6 | – | 2 | – | 0 |
| California | | – | | 4 | – | 1 | – | 2 |
| Oregon Agricultural | | – | | 6 | – | 3 | – | 0 |
| USC | | – | | 6 | – | 3 | – | 1 |
| Arizona | | – | | 4 | – | 2 | – | 0 |
| Oregon | | – | | 4 | – | 2 | – | 2 |
| Washington | | – | | 4 | – | 2 | – | 2 |
| Washington State | | – | | 4 | – | 4 | – | 0 |
| Utah Agricultural | | – | | 2 | – | 2 | – | 1 |
| Wyoming | | – | | 3 | – | 4 | – | 0 |
| Montana | | – | | 2 | – | 3 | – | 0 |
| Montana Agricultural | | – | | 1 | – | 2 | – | 1 |
| Nevada State | | – | | 0 | – | 3 | – | 1 |
| Tempe Normal | | – | | 0 | – | 3 | – | 0 |

The 1905 USC Methodists football team was an American football team that represented the University of Southern California during the 1905 college football season. The team competed as an independent under head coach Harvey Holmes, compiling a 6–3–1 record. The Stanford game was USC's first outside Southern California.

== Schedule ==
| Date | Time | Opponent | Site | Result | Attendance | Source |
|---|---|---|---|---|---|---|
| October 4 | | Company F, National Guard | Bovard Field; Los Angeles, CA | W 28–0 | | |
| October 10 | | Harvard School | Los Angeles, CA | W 12–0 | 300 | |
| October 16 | 3:30 p.m. | Los Angeles Poly High School | Bovard Field; Los Angeles, CA | W 27–0 | | |
| October 18 | 3:40 p.m. | Whittier State | Bovard Field; Los Angeles, CA | W 75–0 | | |
| November 1 | | Alumni | Los Angeles, CA | W 63–0 | | |
| November 4 | | at Stanford | Stanford, CA (rivalry) | L 0–16 | | |
| November 11 | 2:35 p.m. | at Occidental | Occidental field; Los Angeles, CA | L 0–10 | | |
| November 25 | | vs. Sherman Institute | Fiesta Park; Los Angeles, CA | L 0–15 | 800 | |
| December 2 | | St. Vincent's (CA) | Los Angeles, CA | T 0–0 | | |
| December 9 | | vs. Pomona | Fiesta Park; Los Angeles, CA | W 6–4 | 600 | |
