= 1905 University of New Mexico football team =

American college football season

1905 University of New Mexico football
- Conference: Independent
- Record: 5–1–1
- Head coach: Martin F. Angell (1st season)

1905 Far West college football independents records
	Conf.			Overall
Team	W	L	T	W		L		T
Stanford		–		8	–	0	–	0
Idaho		–		5	–	0	–	0
New Mexico A&M		–		3	–	0	–	0
Colorado		–		8	–	1	–	0
New Mexico		–		5	–	1	–	1
Utah		–		6	–	2	–	0
California		–		4	–	1	–	2
Oregon Agricultural		–		6	–	3	–	0
USC		–		6	–	3	–	1
Arizona		–		4	–	2	–	0
Oregon		–		4	–	2	–	2
Washington		–		4	–	2	–	2
Washington State		–		4	–	4	–	0
Utah Agricultural		–		2	–	2	–	1
Wyoming		–		3	–	4	–	0
Montana		–		2	–	3	–	0
Montana Agricultural		–		1	–	2	–	1
Nevada State		–		0	–	3	–	1
Tempe Normal		–		0	–	3	–	0

The 1905 University of New Mexico football team was an American football team represented the University of New Mexico as an independent during the 1905 college football season. In its first season under head coach Martin F. Angell, the team compiled a 5–1–1 record and outscored opponents by a total of 90 to 45. Wales A. Smith was the team captain. Coach Angell was a professor of physics and mathematics.

== Schedule ==
Date	Opponent	Site	Result	Source
October 7	at Menaul School	Menaul School grounds; Albuquerque, New Mexico Territory	T 5–5	
October 14	vs. Albuquerque High School	Fair grounds; Albuquerque, New Mexico Territory	W 16–0	
October 21	Albuquerque High School	Traction Park; Albuquerque, New Mexico Territory	W 15–0	
October 28	Menaul School	Traction Park; Albuquerque, New Mexico Territory	W 15–0	
November 11	at Albuquerque Indian School	Indian school grounds; Albuquerque, New Mexico Territory	W 27–0	
November 18	Santa Fe Indian School	Traction Park; Albuquerque, New Mexico Territory	W 12–0	
November 30	at New Mexico A&M	Las Cruces, New Mexico Territory	L 0–40	

== Roster ==
The roster of the 1905 University of Mexico football team included the following players:

- Walter Allen, right halfback
- Hugh Bryan, right end and left end
- Albert Clancy, quarterback, left end, and right end
- Bernard Crawford, captain, left tackle, right tackle, right end, and left guard
- Tom Danahy, fullback and right tackle
- Gibson, center
- Kenneth Heald, right tackle and fullback
- Mike Maguire, left tackle
- Martin, quarterback
- Joseph Mayo, left end, right end, and left halfback
- Edmund Ross, right guard
- Lawrence Selva, center
- Wales Smith, captain, left halfback, and left guard
- Trimble Wells, left guard and right guard
