= 1903 Utah Agricultural Aggies football team =

American college football season

1903 Utah Agricultural Aggies football
- Conference: Independent
- Record: 3–0
- Head coach: George P. Campbell (2nd season)
- Home stadium: U.A.C. athletic field

1903 Far West college football independents records
	Conf.			Overall
Team	W	L	T	W		L		T
Stanford		–		8	–	0	–	3
Montana Agricultural		–		1	–	0	–	1
California		–		6	–	1	–	2
Washington		–		6	–	1	–	0
Oregon		–		4	–	2	–	1
USC		–		4	–	2	–	0
Albany College (OR)		–		4	–	3	–	0
Utah Agricultural		–		3	–	0	–	0
New Mexico A&M		–		2	–	0	–	1
Arizona		–		2	–	0	–	0
Tempe Normal		–		2	–	0	–	0
Idaho		–		4	–	2	–	0
Wyoming		–		3	–	2	–	0
Washington Agricultural		–		3	–	3	–	2
Utah		–		3	–	5	–	0
Nevada State		–		2	–	4	–	2
Oregon Agricultural		–		2	–	4	–	1
Montana		–		2	–	5	–	0
Academy of Idaho		–		0	–	1	–	1

The 1903 Utah Agricultural Aggies football team was an American football team that represented Utah Agricultural College (later renamed Utah State University) during the 1903 college football season. In their second season under head coach George P. Campbell, the Aggies compiled a 3–0 record and outscored their opponents by a total of 78 to 0. The season included the first game in the Utah State–Wyoming football rivalry with the Aggies defeating the Cowboys, 46–0, at Logan, Utah.

== Schedule ==
Date	Opponent	Site	Result	Attendance	Source
October 10	Salt Lake High School	Logan, UT	W 15–0		
October 17	Utah	Logan, UT (rivalry)	W 17–0	2,000	
November 21	Wyoming	Logan, UT (rivalry)	W 46–0		
