= 1905 New Mexico A&M Aggies football team =

American college football season

1905 New Mexico A&M Aggies football
- Conference: Independent
- Record: 3–0
- Head coach: John O. Miller (6th season)
- Home stadium: College Field

1905 Far West college football independents records
	Conf.			Overall
Team	W	L	T	W		L		T
Stanford		–		8	–	0	–	0
Idaho		–		5	–	0	–	0
New Mexico A&M		–		3	–	0	–	0
Colorado		–		8	–	1	–	0
New Mexico		–		5	–	1	–	1
Utah		–		6	–	2	–	0
California		–		4	–	1	–	2
Oregon Agricultural		–		6	–	3	–	0
USC		–		6	–	3	–	1
Arizona		–		4	–	2	–	0
Oregon		–		4	–	2	–	2
Washington		–		4	–	2	–	2
Washington State		–		4	–	4	–	0
Utah Agricultural		–		2	–	2	–	1
Wyoming		–		3	–	4	–	0
Montana		–		2	–	3	–	0
Montana Agricultural		–		1	–	2	–	1
Nevada State		–		0	–	3	–	1
Tempe Normal		–		0	–	3	–	0

The 1905 New Mexico A&M Aggies football team was an American football team that represented New Mexico College of Agriculture and Mechanical Arts (now known as New Mexico State University) as an independent during the 1905 college football season. In their sixth year under head coach John O. Miller, the Aggies compiled a 3–0 record and outscored opponents by a total of 96 to 0. The team played home games on College Field, later renamed Miller Field in honor of coach Miller.

== Schedule ==
Date	Opponent	Site	Result	Source
November 4	at Fort Bliss	Washington Park; El Paso, TX	W 17–0	
November 30	New Mexico	College Field; Mesilla Park, New Mexico Territory (rivalry)	W 40–0	
December 9	New Mexico Mines	College Field; Mesilla Park, New Mexico Territory	W 39–0	
