= 1905 Nevada State Sagebrushers football team =

American college football season

1905 Nevada State Sagebrushers football
- Conference: Independent
- Record: 0–3–1
- Head coach: None
- Home stadium: Evans Field

1905 Far West college football independents records
	Conf.			Overall
Team	W	L	T	W		L		T
Stanford		–		8	–	0	–	0
Idaho		–		5	–	0	–	0
New Mexico A&M		–		3	–	0	–	0
Colorado		–		8	–	1	–	0
New Mexico		–		5	–	1	–	1
Utah		–		6	–	2	–	0
California		–		4	–	1	–	2
Oregon Agricultural		–		6	–	3	–	0
USC		–		6	–	3	–	1
Arizona		–		4	–	2	–	0
Oregon		–		4	–	2	–	2
Washington		–		4	–	2	–	2
Washington State		–		4	–	4	–	0
Utah Agricultural		–		2	–	2	–	1
Wyoming		–		3	–	4	–	0
Montana		–		2	–	3	–	0
Montana Agricultural		–		1	–	2	–	1
Nevada State		–		0	–	3	–	1
Tempe Normal		–		0	–	3	–	0

The 1905 Nevada State Sagebrushers football team was an American football team that represented Nevada State University (now known as the University of Nevada, Reno) as an independent during the 1905 college football season. The team did not have a head coach.

== Schedule ==
Date	Opponent	Site	Result
September 23	Nevada Alumni	Evans Field; Reno, NV	T 0–0
October 14	Oakland Reliance FBC (CA)	Evans Field; Reno, NV	L 0–5
October 21	at Stanford	Stanford Field; Stanford, CA	L 0–21
November 4	at California	California Field; Berkeley, CA	L 0–16
