= 1903 Albany College football team =

American college football season

1903 Albany College football
- Conference: Independent
- Record: 4–3

1903 Far West college football independents records
	Conf.			Overall
Team	W	L	T	W		L		T
Stanford		–		8	–	0	–	3
Montana Agricultural		–		1	–	0	–	1
California		–		6	–	1	–	2
Washington		–		6	–	1	–	0
Oregon		–		4	–	2	–	1
USC		–		4	–	2	–	0
Albany College (OR)		–		4	–	3	–	0
Utah Agricultural		–		3	–	0	–	0
New Mexico A&M		–		2	–	0	–	1
Arizona		–		2	–	0	–	0
Tempe Normal		–		2	–	0	–	0
Idaho		–		4	–	2	–	0
Wyoming		–		3	–	2	–	0
Washington Agricultural		–		3	–	3	–	2
Utah		–		3	–	5	–	0
Nevada State		–		2	–	4	–	2
Oregon Agricultural		–		2	–	4	–	1
Montana		–		2	–	5	–	0
Academy of Idaho		–		0	–	1	–	1

The 1903 Albany College football team was an American football team that represented Albany College (now known as Lewis & Clark College) during the 1903 college football season. The team compiled a 4–3 record, including a 6–0 victory over Oregon Agricultural, and a 20–6 victory over Linfield.

== Schedule ==
Date	Opponent	Site	Result	Source
October 24	at Oregon	Kincaid Field; Eugene, OR	L 0–22	
October 31	Oregon Agricultural	Rambler Park; Albany, OR	W 6–0	
November 7	vs. Linfield		W 20–6	
November 14	at Multnomah Athletic Club	Multnomah Field; Portland, OR	L 0–15	
November 20	at Willamette	Willamette Field; Salem, OR	L 0–16	
November 21	Chemawa	Albany, OR	W 26–0	
November 27	Pacific (OR)	Albany, OR	W 17–0	
