= 1905 University of Utah football team =

American college football team season

1905 University of Utah football
- Conference: Independent
- Record: 6–2
- Head coach: Joe Maddock (2nd season)
- Captain: Henry Peterson
- Home stadium: Cummings Field

1905 Far West college football independents records
	Conf.			Overall
Team	W	L	T	W		L		T
Stanford		–		8	–	0	–	0
Idaho		–		5	–	0	–	0
New Mexico A&M		–		3	–	0	–	0
Colorado		–		8	–	1	–	0
New Mexico		–		5	–	1	–	1
Utah		–		6	–	2	–	0
California		–		4	–	1	–	2
Oregon Agricultural		–		6	–	3	–	0
USC		–		6	–	3	–	1
Arizona		–		4	–	2	–	0
Oregon		–		4	–	2	–	2
Washington		–		4	–	2	–	2
Washington State		–		4	–	4	–	0
Utah Agricultural		–		2	–	2	–	1
Wyoming		–		3	–	4	–	0
Montana		–		2	–	3	–	0
Montana Agricultural		–		1	–	2	–	1
Nevada State		–		0	–	3	–	1
Tempe Normal		–		0	–	3	–	0

The 1905 University of Utah football team was an American football team that represented the University of Utah as an independent during the 1905 college football season. In its second season under head coach Joe Maddock, the team compiled a 6–2 record, shut out five of eight opponents, and outscored all opponents by a total of 260 to 74. Tackle Henry "Pete" Peterson was the team captain.

On October 28, the team defeated the soldiers from Fort Douglas by a score of 129 to 0, an outcome that remains both the highest point total and largest margin of victory in school history.

== Schedule ==
Date	Opponent	Site	Result	Source
October 7	Wyoming	Cummings Field; Salt Lake City, UT	W 31–0	
October 13	at Montana	University of Montana athletic grounds; Missoula, MT	W 42–0	
October 21	Denver	Cummings Field; Salt Lake City, UT	W 24–6	
October 28	Fort Douglas	Cummings Field; Salt Lake City, UT	W 129–0	
November 4	at Colorado	Gamble Field; Boulder, CO (rivalry)	L 5–46	
November 11	Colorado Mines	Cummings Field; Salt Lake City, UT	L 0–22	
November 25	at Utah Agricultural	Utah A.C. quad; Logan, UT (rivalry)	W 5–0 (forfeit)	
November 30	Colorado Agricultural	Cummings Field; Salt Lake City, UT	W 24–0	
