= 1903 Oregon Webfoots football team =

American college football season

1903 Oregon Webfoots football
- Conference: Independent
- Record: 4–2–1
- Head coach: Warren W. Smith (2nd season)
- Captain: F. G. Thayer
- Home stadium: Kincaid Field

1903 Far West college football independents records
	Conf.			Overall
Team	W	L	T	W		L		T
Stanford		–		8	–	0	–	3
Montana Agricultural		–		1	–	0	–	1
California		–		6	–	1	–	2
Washington		–		6	–	1	–	0
Oregon		–		4	–	2	–	1
USC		–		4	–	2	–	0
Albany College (OR)		–		4	–	3	–	0
Utah Agricultural		–		3	–	0	–	0
New Mexico A&M		–		2	–	0	–	1
Arizona		–		2	–	0	–	0
Tempe Normal		–		2	–	0	–	0
Idaho		–		4	–	2	–	0
Wyoming		–		3	–	2	–	0
Washington Agricultural		–		3	–	3	–	2
Utah		–		3	–	5	–	0
Nevada State		–		2	–	4	–	2
Oregon Agricultural		–		2	–	4	–	1
Montana		–		2	–	5	–	0
Academy of Idaho		–		0	–	1	–	1

The 1903 Oregon Webfoots football team represented the University of Oregon in the 1903 college football season. It was the Webfoots' tenth season; they competed as an independent and were led by head coach Warren W. Smith. They finished the season with a record of four wins, two losses and one tie (4–2–1).

== Schedule ==
Date	Opponent	Site	Result	Attendance	Source
October 17	vs. Oregon alumni	Eugene, OR	W 6–0		
October 24	Albany College (OR)	Kincaid Field; Eugene, OR	W 22–0		
October 31	Willamette	Kincaid Field; Eugene, OR	W 37–0		
November 7	Washington Agricultural	Kincaid Field; Eugene, OR	T 0–0		
November 14	at Washington	Denny Field; Seattle, WA (rivalry)	L 5–6	2,000	
November 21	Oregon Agricultural	Kincaid Field; Eugene, OR (rivalry)	W 5–0		
November 26	at Multnomah Amateur Athletic Club	Multnomah Field; Portland, OR	L 0–12		
