= 1903 Montana football team =

American college football season

1903 Montana football
- Conference: Independent
- Record: 2–5
- Head coach: Hiram Conibear (1st season)

1903 Far West college football independents records
	Conf.			Overall
Team	W	L	T	W		L		T
Stanford		–		8	–	0	–	3
Montana Agricultural		–		1	–	0	–	1
California		–		6	–	1	–	2
Washington		–		6	–	1	–	0
Oregon		–		4	–	2	–	1
USC		–		4	–	2	–	0
Albany College (OR)		–		4	–	3	–	0
Utah Agricultural		–		3	–	0	–	0
New Mexico A&M		–		2	–	0	–	1
Arizona		–		2	–	0	–	0
Tempe Normal		–		2	–	0	–	0
Idaho		–		4	–	2	–	0
Wyoming		–		3	–	2	–	0
Washington Agricultural		–		3	–	3	–	2
Utah		–		3	–	5	–	0
Nevada State		–		2	–	4	–	2
Oregon Agricultural		–		2	–	4	–	1
Montana		–		2	–	5	–	0
Academy of Idaho		–		0	–	1	–	1

The 1903 Montana football team represented the University of Montana in the 1903 college football season. They were led by first-year head coach Hiram Conibear, and finished the season with a record of two wins and five losses (2–5).

== Schedule ==
Date	Opponent	Site	Result	Source
October 10	Fort Missoula	Missoula, MT	W 32–0	
October 17	Fort Missoula	Missoula, MT	W 11–0	
October 24	Montana Mines	Missoula, MT	L 0–19	
November 7	at Montana Mines	Columbia Gardens; Butte, MT	L 0–23	
November 18	at Idaho	Moscow, ID (rivalry)	L 0–28	
November 21	at Washington Agricultural	Rogers Field; Pullman, WA	L 0–28	
November 26	at Montana Agricultural	Bozeman, MT (rivalry)	L 6–15	
