= 1903 Nevada State Sagebrushers football team =

American college football season

1903 Nevada State Sagebrushers football
- Conference: Independent
- Record: 2–4–2
- Head coach: Allen Steckle (3rd season)
- Captain: F. Smith
- Home stadium: Evans Field

1903 Far West college football independents records
	Conf.			Overall
Team	W	L	T	W		L		T
Stanford		–		8	–	0	–	3
Montana Agricultural		–		1	–	0	–	1
California		–		6	–	1	–	2
Washington		–		6	–	1	–	0
Oregon		–		4	–	2	–	1
USC		–		4	–	2	–	0
Albany College (OR)		–		4	–	3	–	0
Utah Agricultural		–		3	–	0	–	0
New Mexico A&M		–		2	–	0	–	1
Arizona		–		2	–	0	–	0
Tempe Normal		–		2	–	0	–	0
Idaho		–		4	–	2	–	0
Wyoming		–		3	–	2	–	0
Washington Agricultural		–		3	–	3	–	2
Utah		–		3	–	5	–	0
Nevada State		–		2	–	4	–	2
Oregon Agricultural		–		2	–	4	–	1
Montana		–		2	–	5	–	0
Academy of Idaho		–		0	–	1	–	1

The 1903 Nevada State Sagebrushers football team was an American football team that represented Nevada State University (now known as the University of Nevada, Reno) as an independent during the 1903 college football season. In its third season under head coach Allen Steckle, the team compiled a 2–4–2 record.

== Schedule ==
Date	Opponent	Site	Result	Attendance	Source
October 6	Nevada alumni	Evans Field; Reno, NV	T 0–0		
October 10	Fort Baker, 32nd Coast Artillery	Evans Field; Reno, NV	W 45–0		
October 14	Reliance Athletic Club	Evans Field; Reno, NV	L 5–11		
October 24	at Stanford	Stanford, CA	T 0–0		
November 7	at California	Berkeley, CA	W 6–2		
November 20	at Washington	Denny Field; Seattle, WA	L 0–2	1,500	
November 23	at Puget Sound	Eleventh Street Grounds; Tacoma, WA	L 0–10		
November 26	at Oregon Agricultural	College Field; Corvallis, OR	L 0–15		
