= 1903 Oregon Agricultural Aggies football team =

American college football season

1903 Oregon Agricultural Aggies football
- Captain Bert Pilkington
- Conference: Independent
- Record: 2–4–1
- Head coach: Thomas L. McFadden (1st season)
- Captain: Bert Pilkington
- Home stadium: OAC Field

1903 Far West college football independents records
	Conf.			Overall
Team	W	L	T	W		L		T
Stanford		–		8	–	0	–	3
Montana Agricultural		–		1	–	0	–	1
California		–		6	–	1	–	2
Washington		–		6	–	1	–	0
Oregon		–		4	–	2	–	1
USC		–		4	–	2	–	0
Albany College (OR)		–		4	–	3	–	0
Utah Agricultural		–		3	–	0	–	0
New Mexico A&M		–		2	–	0	–	1
Arizona		–		2	–	0	–	0
Tempe Normal		–		2	–	0	–	0
Idaho		–		4	–	2	–	0
Wyoming		–		3	–	2	–	0
Washington Agricultural		–		3	–	3	–	2
Utah		–		3	–	5	–	0
Nevada State		–		2	–	4	–	2
Oregon Agricultural		–		2	–	4	–	1
Montana		–		2	–	5	–	0
Academy of Idaho		–		0	–	1	–	1

The 1903 Oregon Agricultural Aggies football team represented Oregon Agricultural College (now known as Oregon State University) as an independent during the 1903 college football season. In their first and only season under head coach Thomas L. McFadden, the Aggies compiled a 2–4–1 record and were outscored their opponents 32 to 21. The Aggies defeated Washington Agricultural (6–0) and Nevada State (15–0), tied with Pacific University (0–0), and lost to Washington (5–0), Multnomah Athletic Club (16–0), Albany College (6–0), and Oregon (5–0). Bert Pilkington was the team captain.

== Schedule ==
Date	Opponent	Site	Result	Attendance	Source
October 17	Washington	OAC Field; Corvallis, OR	L 0–5		
October 25	at Multnomah Athletic Club	Multnomah Field; Portland	L 0–16		
October 31	at Albany College	Rambler Park; Albany, OR	L 0–6		
November 7	Pacific (OR)	College Field; Corvallis	T 0–0		
November 11	Washington Agricultural	OAC Field; Corvallis	W 6–0		
November 21	at Oregon	Kincaid Field; Eugene, OR (rivalry)	L 0–5		
November 26	Nevada State	OAC Field; Corvallis	W 15–0		
