= 1905 Montana football team =

American college football season

1905 Montana football
- Conference: Independent
- Record: 2–3
- Head coach: Frederick Schule (1st season)

1905 Far West college football independents records
	Conf.			Overall
Team	W	L	T	W		L		T
Stanford		–		8	–	0	–	0
Idaho		–		5	–	0	–	0
New Mexico A&M		–		3	–	0	–	0
Colorado		–		8	–	1	–	0
New Mexico		–		5	–	1	–	1
Utah		–		6	–	2	–	0
California		–		4	–	1	–	2
Oregon Agricultural		–		6	–	3	–	0
USC		–		6	–	3	–	1
Arizona		–		4	–	2	–	0
Oregon		–		4	–	2	–	2
Washington		–		4	–	2	–	2
Washington State		–		4	–	4	–	0
Utah Agricultural		–		2	–	2	–	1
Wyoming		–		3	–	4	–	0
Montana		–		2	–	3	–	0
Montana Agricultural		–		1	–	2	–	1
Nevada State		–		0	–	3	–	1
Tempe Normal		–		0	–	3	–	0

The 1905 Montana football team represented the University of Montana in the 1905 college football season. They were led by first-year head coach Frederick Schule, and finished the season with a record of two wins and three losses (2–3).

== Schedule ==
Date	Opponent	Site	Result	Source
October 13	Utah	Missoula, MT	L 0–42	
October 25	at Whitman	Ankey Field; Walla Walla, WA	L 0–5	
October 28	at Washington State	Rogers Field; Pullman, WA	L 6–28	
November 7	Utah Agricultural	Missoula, MT	W 23–0	
November 18	Fort Shaw Indian School	Missoula, MT	W 88–0	
