= 1905 Oregon Agricultural Aggies football team =

American college football season

1905 Oregon Agricultural Aggies football
- Coach Steckle as an All-American in 1898
- Conference: Independent
- Record: 6–3
- Head coach: Allen Steckle (2nd season)
- Captain: George Root
- Home stadium: OAC Field

1905 Far West college football independents records
	Conf.			Overall
Team	W	L	T	W		L		T
Stanford		–		8	–	0	–	0
Idaho		–		5	–	0	–	0
New Mexico A&M		–		3	–	0	–	0
Colorado		–		8	–	1	–	0
New Mexico		–		5	–	1	–	1
Utah		–		6	–	2	–	0
California		–		4	–	1	–	2
Oregon Agricultural		–		6	–	3	–	0
USC		–		6	–	3	–	1
Arizona		–		4	–	2	–	0
Oregon		–		4	–	2	–	2
Washington		–		4	–	2	–	2
Washington State		–		4	–	4	–	0
Utah Agricultural		–		2	–	2	–	1
Wyoming		–		3	–	4	–	0
Montana		–		2	–	3	–	0
Montana Agricultural		–		1	–	2	–	1
Nevada State		–		0	–	3	–	1
Tempe Normal		–		0	–	3	–	0

The 1905 Oregon Agricultural Aggies football team represented Oregon Agricultural College (now known as Oregon State University) as an independent during the 1905 college football season. In their second and final season under head coach Allen Steckle, a former All-American tackle from Michigan, the Aggies compiled a 6–3 record and outscored their opponents by a combined total of 166 to 28.

OAC defeated Washington State (29–0), Willamette (28–0), and Washington (16–0), and lost to California (0–10), Oregon (0–6), and the Multnomah Athletic Club (5–6). Bert Pilkington was the team captain.

== Schedule ==
Date	Opponent	Site	Result	Attendance	Source
September 30	O.A.C. alumni	OAC Field; Corvallis, OR	W 10–6		
October 7	Chemawa	OAC Field; Corvallis, OR	W 18–0		
October 14	Whitworth	OAC Field; Corvallis, OR	W 58–0		
October 21	Washington State	OAC Field; Corvallis, OR	W 29–0		
October 28	at California	California Field; Berkeley, CA	L 0–10		
November 11	at Oregon	Kincaid Field; Eugene, OR (rivalry)	L 0–6		
November 24	Willamette	OAC Field; Corvallis, OR	W 28–0		
November 30	at Washington	Recreation Park; Seattle, WA	W 16–0		
December 9	at Multnomah Athletic Club	Multnomah Field; Portland, OR	L 5–6		
