= 1903 Washington Agricultural football team =

American college football season

1903 Washington Agricultural football
- Conference: Independent
- Record: 3–3–2
- Head coach: James N. Ashmore (1st season)
- Captain: Clyde Gill
- Home stadium: Rogers Field

1903 Far West college football independents records
	Conf.			Overall
Team	W	L	T	W		L		T
Stanford		–		8	–	0	–	3
Montana Agricultural		–		1	–	0	–	1
California		–		6	–	1	–	2
Washington		–		6	–	1	–	0
Oregon		–		4	–	2	–	1
USC		–		4	–	2	–	0
Albany College (OR)		–		4	–	3	–	0
Utah Agricultural		–		3	–	0	–	0
New Mexico A&M		–		2	–	0	–	1
Arizona		–		2	–	0	–	0
Tempe Normal		–		2	–	0	–	0
Idaho		–		4	–	2	–	0
Wyoming		–		3	–	2	–	0
Washington Agricultural		–		3	–	3	–	2
Utah		–		3	–	5	–	0
Nevada State		–		2	–	4	–	2
Oregon Agricultural		–		2	–	4	–	1
Montana		–		2	–	5	–	0
Academy of Idaho		–		0	–	1	–	1

The 1903 Washington Agricultural football team was an American football team that represented Washington Agricultural College during the 1903 college football season. The team competed as an independent under head coach James N. Ashmore and compiled a record of 3–3–2.

== Schedule ==
Date	Opponent	Site	Result	Attendance	Source
October 3	Spokane High School	Rogers Field; Pullman, WA	W 40–0		
October 14	Puget Sound	Rogers Field; Pullman, WA	T 0–0		
October 23	at Idaho	Moscow, ID (rivalry)	L 0–32		
October 30	Washington	Rogers Field; Pullman, WA (rivalry)	L 0–10	700	
November 7	at Oregon	Kincaid Field; Eugene, OR	T 18–6		
November 11	at Oregon Agricultural	College Field; Corvallis, OR	L 0–6		
November 21	Montana	Rogers Field; Pullman, WA	W 34–0		
November 26	at Whitman	Walla Walla, WA	W 18–6	1,500	
