= 1903 Washington football team =

American college football season

1903 Washington football
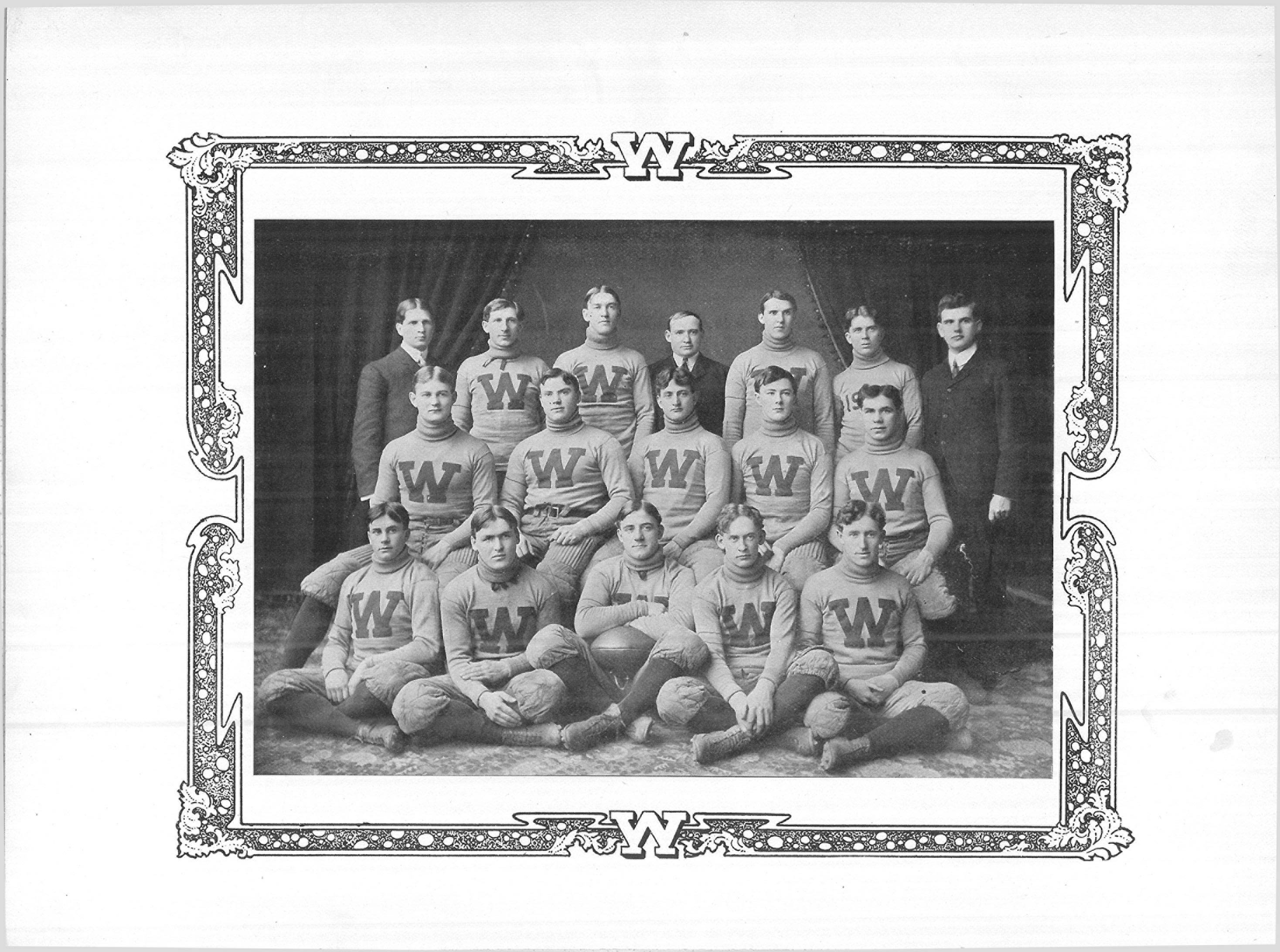

NIAA champion
- Conference: Northwest Intercollegiate Athletic Association
- Record: 6–1 (5–0 NIAA)
- Head coach: James Knight (2nd season)
- Captain: William Speidel
- Home stadium: Athletic Park

1903 Northwest Intercollegiate Athletic Association football standings
	Conf.					Overall
Team	W		L		T	W		L		T
Washington $	5	–	0	–	0	6	–	1	–	0
Montana Agricultural	1	–	0	–	0	1	–	0	–	1
Idaho	3	–	1	–	0	4	–	2	–	0
Oregon	1	–	1	–	1	4	–	2	–	1
Oregon Agricultural	1	–	2	–	1	2	–	4	–	1
Washington State	2	–	3	–	1	3	–	3	–	2
Montana	0	–	3	–	0	2	–	5	–	0
Pacific	—	–	—	–	—	—	–	—	–	—
Whitman	—	–	—	–	—	—	–	—	–	—
$ – Conference champion

The 1903 Washington football team was an American football team that represented the University of Washington as an independent during the 1903 college football season. In its second season under coach James Knight, the team compiled a 6–1 record, shut out five of seven opponents, and outscored all opponents by a combined total of 63 to 11. William Speidel was the team captain.

== Schedule ==
Date	Time	Opponent	Site	Result	Attendance	Source
October 17		at Oregon Agricultural	College Field; Corvallis, OR	W 5–0	600	
October 24		Whitman	Athletic Park; Seattle, WA	W 35–0		
October 30		at Washington Agricultural	Rogers Field; Pullman, WA (rivalry)	W 10–0		
November 14		Oregon	Athletic Park; Seattle, WA (rivalry)	W 6–5	2,000	
November 20		Nevada State*	Athletic Park; Seattle, WA	W 2–0	3,000	
November 26	1:30 p.m.	Idaho	Athletic Park; Seattle, WA	W 5–0		
December 5		at Multnomah Athletic Club*	Multnomah Field; Portland, OR	L 0–6	1,000–1,500	
*Non-conference game; Source:
