= 1905 Washington State football team =

American college football season

1905 Washington State football
- Conference: Independent
- Record: 4–4
- Head coach: Everett Sweeley (2nd season)
- Captain: Elbert Stewart
- Home stadium: Rogers Field

1905 Midwestern college football independents records
	Conf.			Overall
Team	W	L	T	W		L		T
Lincoln (MO)		–		3	–	0	–	0
Detroit College		–		1	–	0	–	0
Kansas		–		10	–	1	–	0
Central Michigan		–		7	–	1	–	0
Doane		–		5	–	1	–	0
Nebraska		–		9	–	2	–	0
Saint Louis		–		7	–	2	–	0
Butler		–		7	–	2	–	1
Kansas State		–		6	–	2	–	0
Northern Illinois State		–		3	–	1	–	1
Carthage		–		4	–	2	–	0
Western Illinois		–		4	–	2	–	0
Iowa State		–		6	–	3	–	0
Washington University		–		7	–	3	–	2
Wittenberg		–		7	–	4	–	0
Heidelberg		–		6	–	4	–	0
Iowa State Normal		–		5	–	3	–	2
Cincinnati		–		5	–	3	–	0
Miami (OH)		–		4	–	3	–	0
Missouri		–		5	–	4	–	0
Notre Dame		–		5	–	4	–	0
Fairmount		–		5	–	4	–	1
Haskell		–		5	–	4	–	1
Lake Forest		–		6	–	5	–	0
Wabash		–		6	–	5	–	0
Drake		–		4	–	4	–	0
Michigan State Normal		–		4	–	4	–	0
Marquette		–		3	–	4	–	0
South Dakota State		–		2	–	3	–	0
Ohio		–		2	–	5	–	2
DePauw		–		3	–	6	–	0
Mount Union		–		2	–	6	–	0
North Dakota Agricultural		–		1	–	4	–	1
Baldwin–Wallace		–		0	–	1	–	0
Chicago P&S		–		0	–	1	–	0
St. Mary's (OH)		–		0	–	3	–	0

The 1905 Washington State football team was an American football team that represented Washington State College during the 1905 college football season. The team competed as an independent under head coach Everett Sweeley and compiled a record of 4–4.

== Schedule ==
Date	Opponent	Site	Result	Attendance	Source
September 30	Spokane High School	Rogers Field; Pullman, WA	W 51–0	350	
October 7	Lewiston High School	Rogers Field; Pullman, WA	W 52–0	400	
October 11	Montana Agricultural	Rogers Field; Pullman, WA	W 32–0	600	
October 18	at Willamette	Salem, OR	L 6–11	600	
October 21	at Oregon Agricultural	College Field; Corvallis, OR	L 0–29		
October 28	Montana	Rogers Field; Pullman, WA	W 28–6	600	
November 10	at Idaho	Moscow, ID (rivalry)	L 0–5	500	
November 30	at Whitman	Walla Walla, WA	L 6–10	700	
