= A. King Dickson =

American football coach, lawyer, and banker (1876–1938)

Biographical details
- Born: August 11, 1876; Philadelphia, Pennsylvania, U.S.
- Died: November 4, 1938 (aged 62); Darby, Pennsylvania, U.S.

Playing career

Football
- 1896: Penn

Football
- 1896–1897: Penn
- Positions: Quarterback (football); Pitcher (baseball)

Coaching career (HC unless noted)

Football
- 1899: Nevada State

Head coaching record
- Overall: 3–2

Alexander King Dickson Jr. (August 11, 1876 – November 4, 1938) was an American college football coach, lawyer, and banker. He served as the head football coach at Nevada State University—now known as the University of Nevada, Reno—for one season, in 1899, leading Nevada State to it second consecutive winning season, with a 3–2 record. The three wins were against the Pacific Tigers, Santa Clara, and San Jose Normal; the two losses were versus California and Stanford. According to the 1901 yearbook Artemesia, "They (the team) were not strong enough to beat Berkeley or Stanford, but they scored a touchdown...(against) the latter."

Dickson graduated from the University of Pennsylvania in 1897 and the University of Pennsylvania Law School in 1901. He played football and baseball there. He began working for the Land Title Bank and Trust Company in 1909, holding the title of assistant vice president at the time of his death. Dickson died after suffering a heart attack on November 4, 1938.

== Head coaching record ==
Year	Team	Overall	Conference	Standing	Bowl/playoffs
Nevada State Sagebrushers (Independent) (1899)
1899	Nevada State	3–2			
Nevada State:		3–2			
Total:		3–2			
