= Alexander Dickson =

Alexander Dickson may refer to:

- Alexander Dicsone (1558–by 1604), Scottish writer and political agent
- Alexander Dickson (British Army officer) (1777–1840), British army officer
- Alexander George Dickson (1834–1889), Conservative MP
- Alexander Dickson (botanist) (1836–1887), Her Majesty's Botanist
- Alec Dickson (1914–1994), founder of Voluntary Service Overseas
- Alex Dickson (boxer) (born 1962), British Olympic boxer and former British champion
- Alex D. Dickson (born 1926), American bishop
- A. King Dickson (1870–1938), American college football coach
