= 1899 Montana football team =

American college football season

1899 Montana football
- Conference: Independent
- Record: 1–2
- Head coach: Guy Cleveland (1st season)

1899 Far West college football independents records
	Conf.			Overall
Team	W	L	T	W		L		T
Montana Agricultural		–		3	–	0	–	0
Arizona Normal		–		3	–	0	–	0
New Mexico A&M		–		1	–	0	–	0
Utah Agricultural		–		1	–	0	–	0
California		–		7	–	1	–	1
Washington		–		4	–	1	–	1
Utah		–		2	–	1	–	0
San Jose Normal		–		6	–	3	–	1
Nevada State		–		3	–	2	–	0
Oregon Agricultural		–		3	–	2	–	0
Oregon		–		3	–	2	–	1
Arizona		–		1	–	1	–	1
Washington Agricultural		–		1	–	1	–	0
Montana		–		1	–	2	–	0
Idaho		–		1	–	3	–	0
USC		–		2	–	3	–	1
Stanford		–		2	–	5	–	2
Wyoming		–		0	–	1	–	1
Pacific (CA)		–		0	–	4	–	0

The 1899 Montana football team represented the University of Montana in the 1899 college football season. They were led by first-year head coach Guy Cleveland and finished the season with a record of one win and two losses (1–2).

== Schedule ==
Date	Time	Opponent	Site	Result	Source
October 28		Anaconda High School	Missoula, MT	W 12–5	
November 17	2:00 p.m.	Montana Agricultural	Missoula, MT (rivalry)	L 0–5	
November 30		Montana Agricultural	Bozeman, MT	L 0–38	
