= 1899 Normal School of Arizona Normals football team =

American college football season

1899 Normal School of Arizona Normals football
- Conference: Independent
- Record: 3–0
- Head coach: Frederick M. Irish (2nd season)

1899 Far West college football independents records
	Conf.			Overall
Team	W	L	T	W		L		T
Montana Agricultural		–		3	–	0	–	0
Arizona Normal		–		3	–	0	–	0
New Mexico A&M		–		1	–	0	–	0
Utah Agricultural		–		1	–	0	–	0
California		–		7	–	1	–	1
Washington		–		4	–	1	–	1
Utah		–		2	–	1	–	0
San Jose Normal		–		6	–	3	–	1
Nevada State		–		3	–	2	–	0
Oregon Agricultural		–		3	–	2	–	0
Oregon		–		3	–	2	–	1
Arizona		–		1	–	1	–	1
Washington Agricultural		–		1	–	1	–	0
Montana		–		1	–	2	–	0
Idaho		–		1	–	3	–	0
USC		–		2	–	3	–	1
Stanford		–		2	–	5	–	2
Wyoming		–		0	–	1	–	1
Pacific (CA)		–		0	–	4	–	0

The 1899 Normal School of Arizona Normals football team was an American football team that represented the Normal School of Arizona (later renamed Arizona State University) as an independent during the 1899 college football season. In its second season of varsity football (an 1897 team played one game), the Normals compiled a 3–0 record. The team captain was Walter Shute. The team was known by the nickname "Normals".

The season began with the first two victories in program history, one over the Phoenix Indian School, and the other over Phoenix High School. On November 30, 1899, the team played and won its first intercollegiate football game, an 11–2 victory over the University of Arizona. The game was the inaugural meeting in the Arizona–Arizona State football rivalry and was played in front of an estimated 300 spectators at the Carillo Gardens amusement center near the Santa Cruz River in Tucson.

== Schedule ==
Date	Opponent	Site	Result	Attendance	Source
November 18	at Phoenix Indian School	Phoenix Park; Phoenix, Arizona Territory	W 6–0		
	at Phoenix High School	Phoenix, Arizona Territory	W 6–0		
November 30	at Arizona	Carillo Gardens; Tucson, Arizona Territory (rivalry)	W 11–2	300	
