= 1899 Nevada State Sagebrushers football team =

American college football season

1899 Nevada State Sagebrushers football
- Conference: Independent
- Record: 3–2
- Head coach: A. King Dickson (1st season)
- Home stadium: Evans Field

1899 Far West college football independents records
	Conf.			Overall
Team	W	L	T	W		L		T
Montana Agricultural		–		3	–	0	–	0
Arizona Normal		–		3	–	0	–	0
New Mexico A&M		–		1	–	0	–	0
Utah Agricultural		–		1	–	0	–	0
California		–		7	–	1	–	1
Washington		–		4	–	1	–	1
Utah		–		2	–	1	–	0
San Jose Normal		–		6	–	3	–	1
Nevada State		–		3	–	2	–	0
Oregon Agricultural		–		3	–	2	–	0
Oregon		–		3	–	2	–	1
Arizona		–		1	–	1	–	1
Washington Agricultural		–		1	–	1	–	0
Montana		–		1	–	2	–	0
Idaho		–		1	–	3	–	0
USC		–		2	–	3	–	1
Stanford		–		2	–	5	–	2
Wyoming		–		0	–	1	–	1
Pacific (CA)		–		0	–	4	–	0

The 1899 Nevada State Sagebrushers football team was an American football team that represented Nevada State University (now known as the University of Nevada, Reno) as an independent during the 1899 college football season. In its first and only season under head coach A. King Dickson, the team compiled a 3–2 record.

== Schedule ==
Date	Time	Opponent	Site	Result	Source
October 14	2:15 p.m.	Pacific (CA)	Evans Field; Reno, NV	W 63–5	
October 28		Santa Clara	Evans Field; Reno, NV	W 11–6	
November 11		at Stanford	Stanford, CA	L 5–17	
November 15		at California	Berkeley, CA	L 0–24	
November 30	2:00 p.m.	San Jose Normal	Evans Field; Reno, NV	W 6–0	
