= Idaho football, 1893–1899 =

American college football seasons

The Idaho football teams (later known as the Idaho Vandals) represented the University of Idaho in American football during the program's first decade from 1893 to 1899. Highlights include the following:

- In 1893, Idaho began its intercollegiate football program, and played to a tie against the Spokane Athletic Club.
- In 1899, Idaho won its first intercollegiate game with a 5–0 victory over Lewiston Normal. The victory broke a seven-game losing streak dating back to 1894.

== 1893 ==
1893 Idaho football
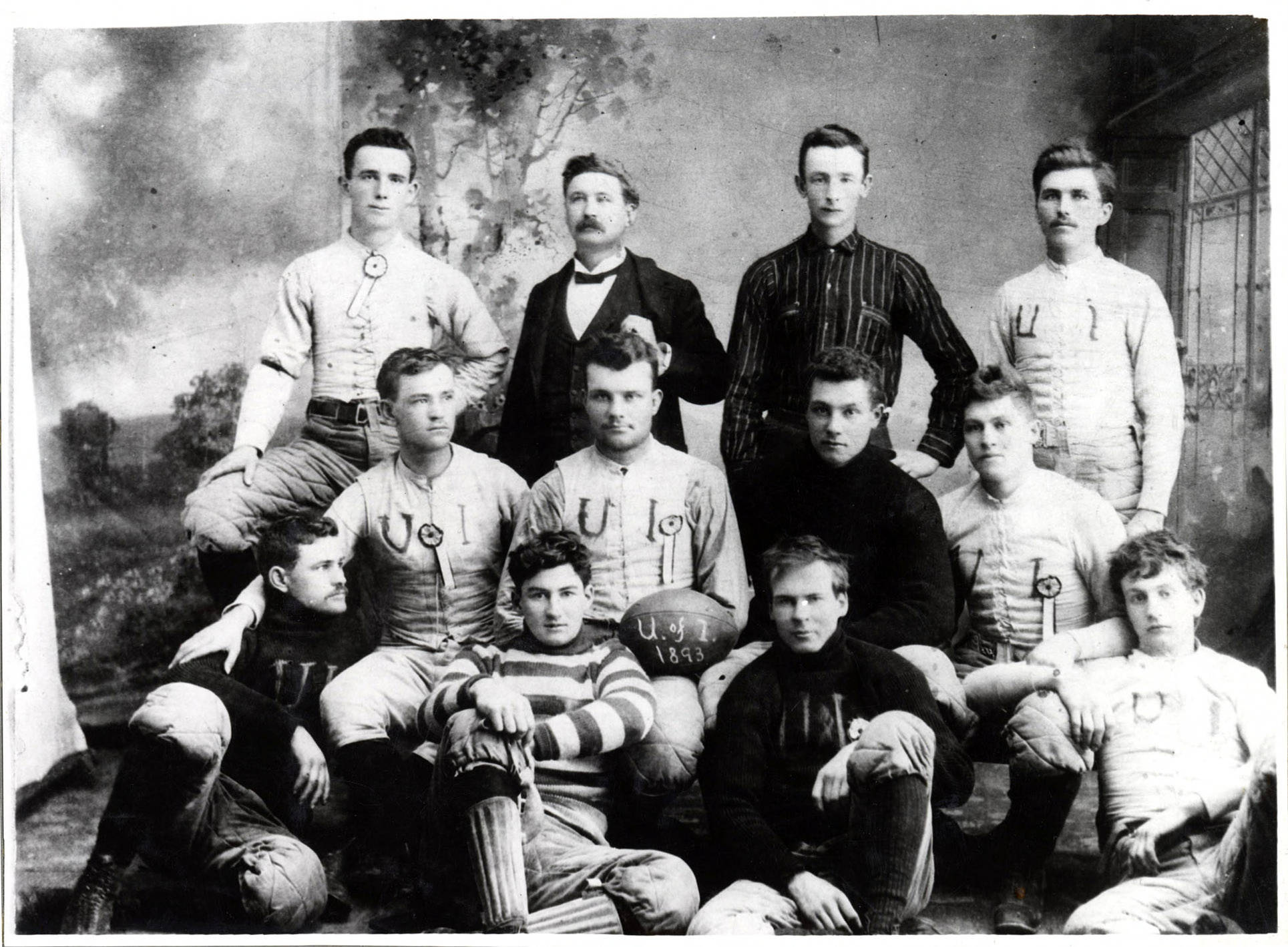
- Conference: Independent
- Record: 0–0–1
- Head coach: Unknown

1893 Far West college football independents records
	Conf.			Overall
Team	W	L	T	W		L		T
Stanford		–		8	–	0	–	1
Pacific University		–		2	–	0	–	0
Gonzaga		–		1	–	0	–	0
Saint Mary's		–		1	–	0	–	0
Wyoming		–		1	–	0	–	0
Oregon Agricultural		–		5	–	1	–	0
California		–		5	–	1	–	1
USC		–		3	–	1	–	0
Washington		–		1	–	3	–	1
Idaho		–		0	–	0	–	1
San Jose Normal		–		0	–	1	–	0
Albany College		–		0	–	1	–	0
Oregon State Normal		–		0	–	4	–	0

The 1893 Idaho football team represented the University of Idaho during the 1893 college football season. In what was the first season of football at the school, Idaho finished with a record of 0–0–1. In what was their first game, Idaho traveled to Spokane and tied the Spokane Athletic Club in the first game played by the school.

=== Schedule ===
Date	Opponent	Site	Result	Attendance	Source
November 30	at Spokane Athletic Club	Ball Park; Spokane, WA	T 8–8	700	

== 1894 ==
1894 Idaho football
- Conference: Independent
- Record: 0–2
- Head coach: G. E. Higgins (1st season)

1894 Far West college football independents records
	Conf.			Overall
Team	W	L	T	W		L		T
Wyoming		–		3	–	0	–	0
USC		–		1	–	0	–	0
Stanford		–		6	–	3	–	0
Saint Mary's		–		2	–	2	–	0
Washington Agricultural		–		1	–	1	–	0
Washington		–		1	–	1	–	1
Utah		–		1	–	2	–	0
California		–		0	–	1	–	2
New Mexico A&M		–		0	–	1	–	0
Idaho		–		0	–	2	–	0

The 1894 Idaho football team represented the University of Idaho during the 1894 college football season. In their first season under head coach G. E. Higgins, Idaho had an overall record of 0–2. Their game against Washington Agricultural (now Washington State University) was the first all-time game played by the Pullman school.

=== Schedule ===
Date	Opponent	Site	Result	Source
November 18	Washington Agricultural	Moscow, ID (rivalry)	L 0–10	
December 4	at Lewiston Normal	Lewiston, ID	L 4–6	

== 1895 ==
1895 Idaho football
- Conference: Independent
- Record: 0–1
- Head coach: G. E. Higgins (2nd season)

1895 Far West college football independents records
	Conf.			Overall
Team	W	L	T	W		L		T
Occidental		–		5	–	0	–	0
New Mexico A&M		–		2	–	0	–	0
Washington Agricultural		–		2	–	0	–	0
Gonzaga		–		1	–	0	–	0
Wyoming		–		1	–	0	–	0
Stanford		–		4	–	0	–	1
Washington		–		4	–	0	–	1
California		–		3	–	1	–	1
Pacific (CA)		–		0	–	0	–	1
Saint Mary's		–		1	–	1	–	0
San Jose Normal		–		0	–	0	–	1
USC		–		0	–	1	–	1
Idaho		–		0	–	1	–	0
Utah		–		0	–	1	–	0

The 1895 Idaho football team represented the University of Idaho during the 1895 college football season. In their second season under head coach G. E. Higgins, Idaho had an overall record of 0–1.

=== Schedule ===
Date	Opponent	Site	Result	Attendance	Source
November 9	at Washington Agricultural	Soldier Field; Pullman, WA (rivalry)	L 4–10	500	

== 1896 ==
=== Schedule ===
1896 Idaho football
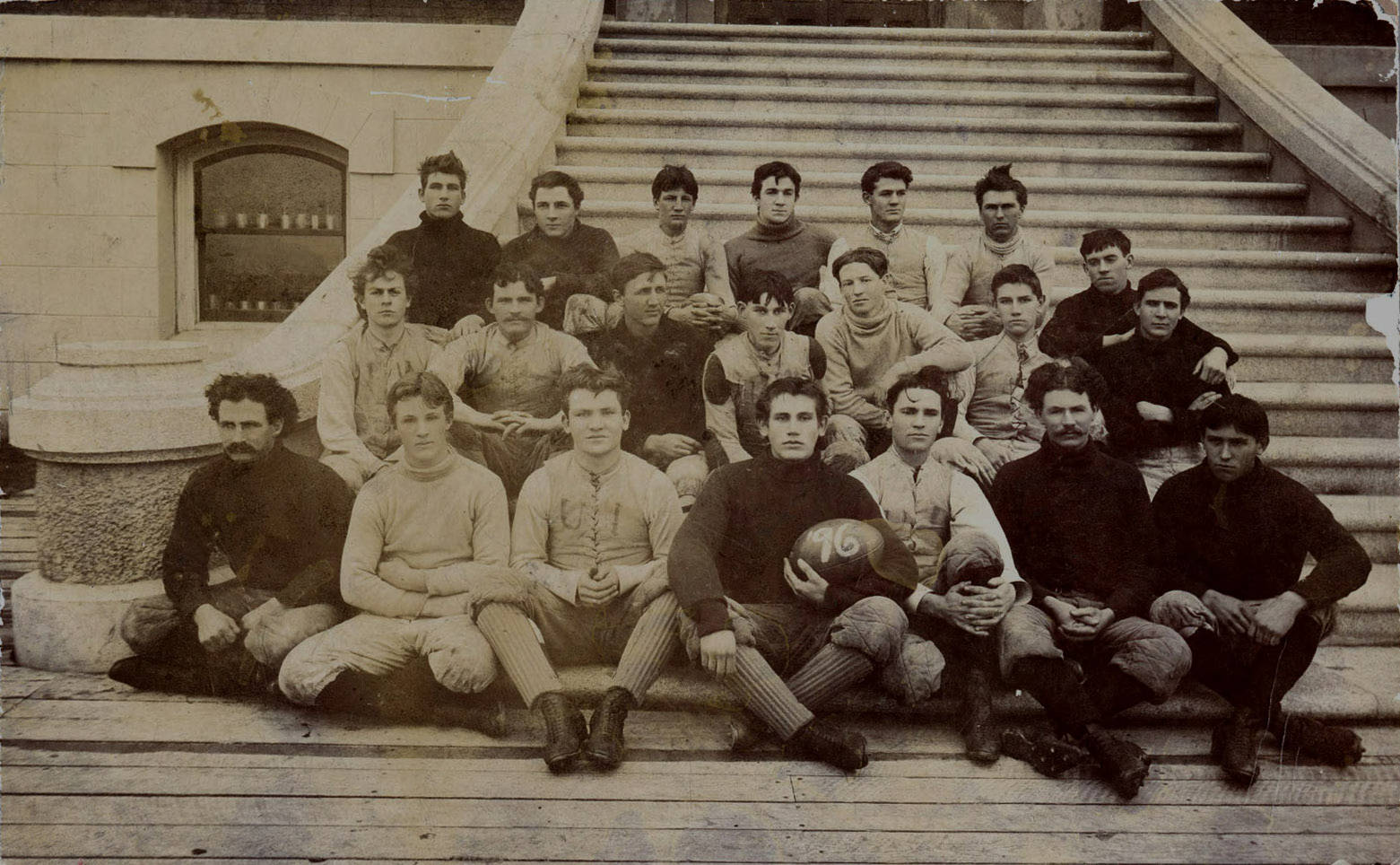
- Conference: Independent
- Record: 0–0

Date	Opponent	Site	Result	Source
November 21	Lewiston Normal	Lewiston, ID	Cancelled	
November 28	Washington Agricultural	Moscow, ID (rivalry)	Cancelled	
November 28	Idaho (second team)	Moscow, ID	W 22–6 (scrimmage)	

== 1897 ==
1897 Idaho football
- Conference: Independent
- Record: 0–1
- Head coach: G. E. Higgins (3rd season)

1897 Far West college football independents records
	Conf.			Overall
Team	W	L	T	W		L		T
Oregon Agricultural		–		5	–	0	–	0
Washington Agricultural		–		2	–	0	–	0
Wyoming		–		2	–	0	–	0
USC		–		5	–	1	–	0
Stanford		–		4	–	1	–	0
New Mexico A&M		–		1	–	0	–	1
Oregon		–		1	–	1	–	0
Montana		–		1	–	2	–	3
Washington		–		1	–	2	–	0
Montana Agricultural		–		1	–	3	–	0
California		–		0	–	3	–	2
Utah		–		1	–	5	–	0
Arizona Normal		–		0	–	1	–	0
Idaho		–		0	–	1	–	0
Nevada State		–		0	–	1	–	0

The 1897 Idaho football team represented the University of Idaho during the 1897 college football season. In their third season under head coach G. E. Higgins, Idaho had an overall record of 0–1. This marked the return of Idaho football after their only game scheduled in 1896 against Washington Agricultural was canceled.

=== Schedule ===
Date	Opponent	Site	Result	Attendance	Source
November 25	at Spokane Athletic Club	Ball Park; Spokane, WA	L 4–12	800	

== 1898 ==
1898 Idaho football
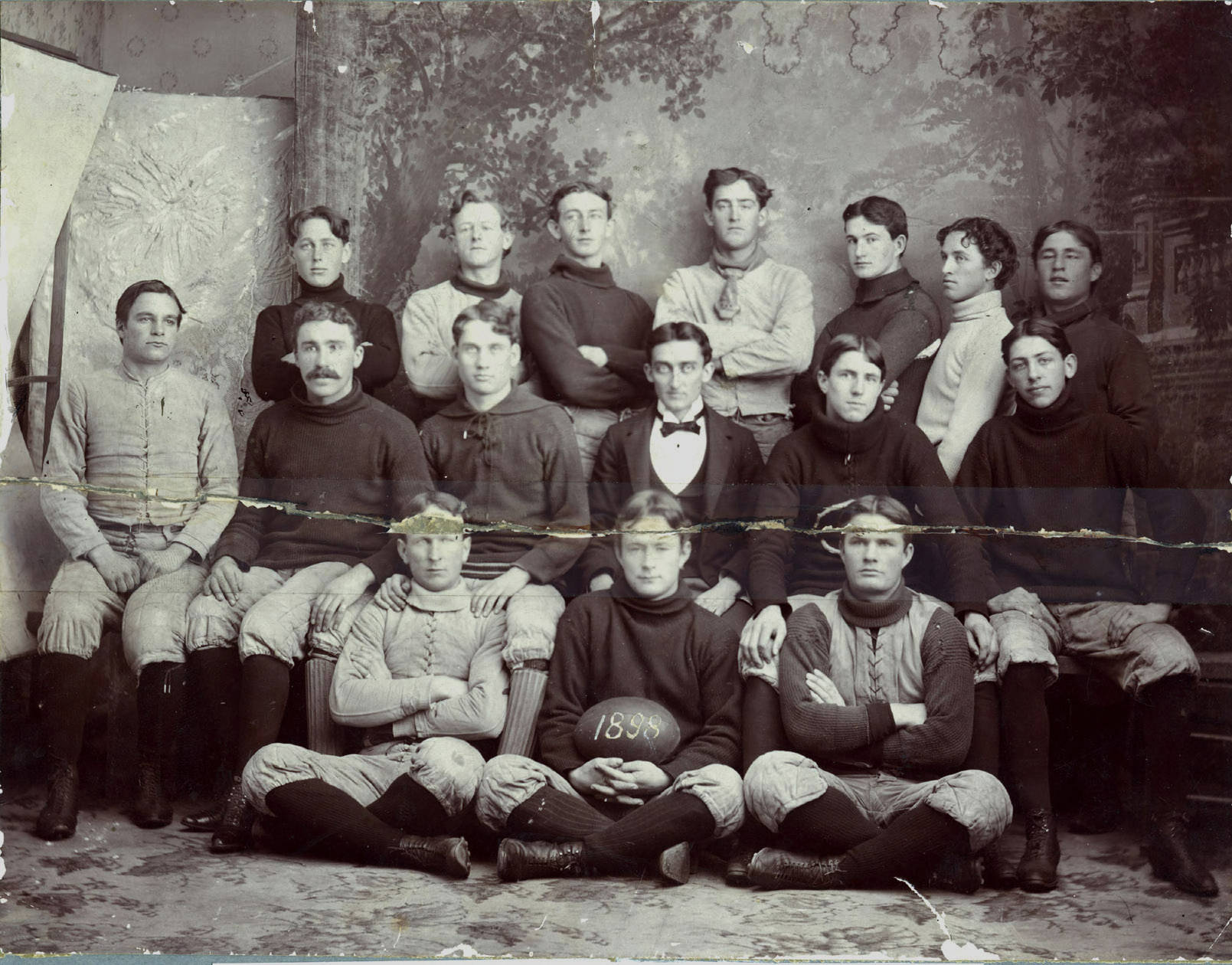
- Conference: Independent
- Record: 0–0

=== Schedule ===
Date	Opponent	Site	Result	Source
November 24	Washington Agricultural	Moscow, ID (rivalry)	Cancelled	
November 24	Idaho (second team)	Moscow, ID	W 10–0 (scrimmage)	

== 1899 ==
1899 Idaho football
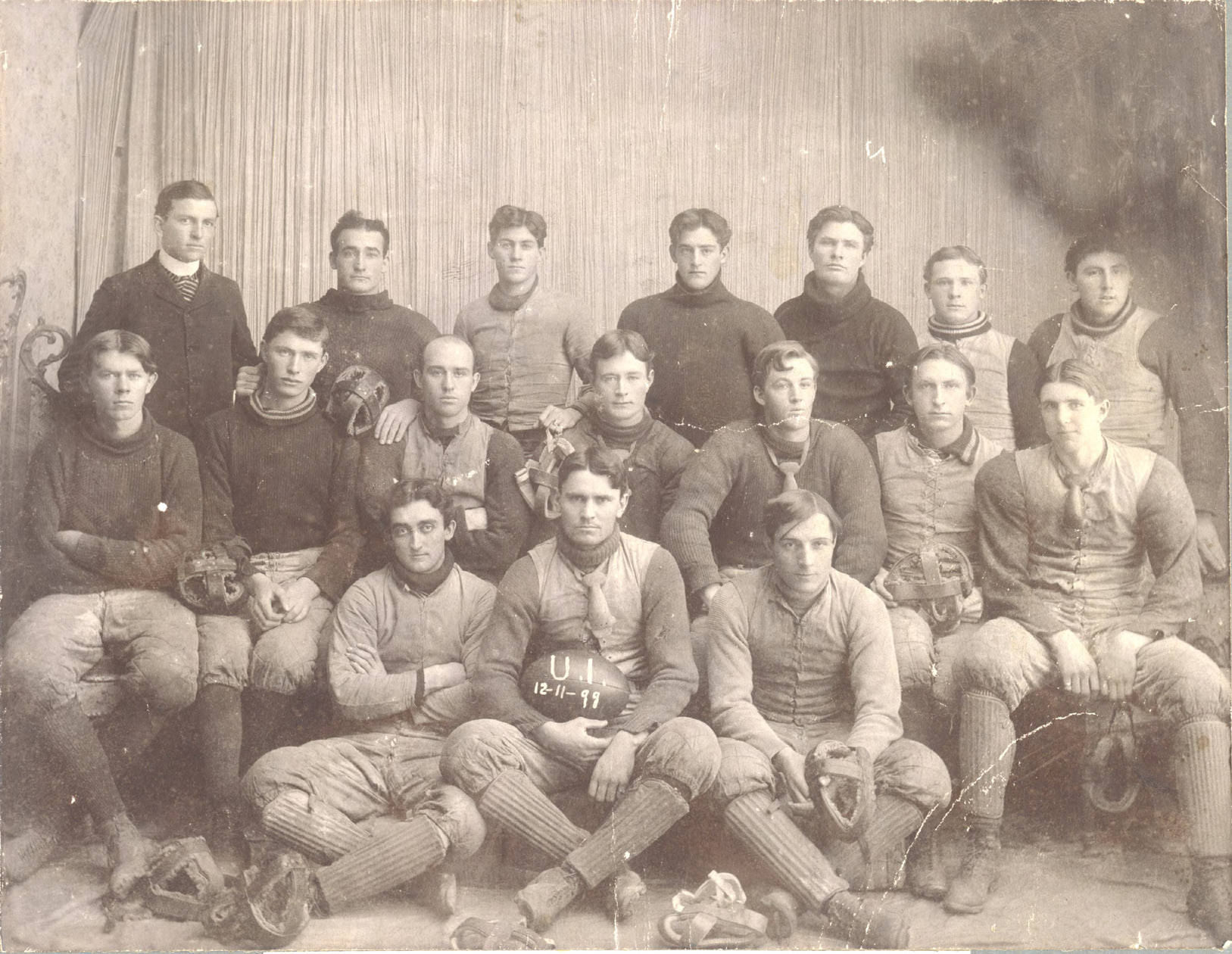
- Conference: Independent
- Record: 1–3
- Head coach: Newton M. S. Morse (1st season)

1899 Far West college football independents records
	Conf.			Overall
Team	W	L	T	W		L		T
Montana Agricultural		–		3	–	0	–	0
Arizona Normal		–		3	–	0	–	0
New Mexico A&M		–		1	–	0	–	0
Utah Agricultural		–		1	–	0	–	0
California		–		7	–	1	–	1
Washington		–		4	–	1	–	1
Utah		–		2	–	1	–	0
San Jose Normal		–		6	–	3	–	1
Nevada State		–		3	–	2	–	0
Oregon Agricultural		–		3	–	2	–	0
Oregon		–		3	–	2	–	1
Arizona		–		1	–	1	–	1
Washington Agricultural		–		1	–	1	–	0
Montana		–		1	–	2	–	0
Idaho		–		1	–	3	–	0
USC		–		2	–	3	–	1
Stanford		–		2	–	5	–	2
Wyoming		–		0	–	1	–	1
Pacific (CA)		–		0	–	4	–	0

The 1899 Idaho football team represented the University of Idaho during the 1899 college football season. In their first season under head coach Newton M. S. Morse, Idaho had an overall record of 1–3. This marked the return of Idaho football after not playing during the 1898 season. Their 5–0 victory over Lewiston Normal in the final game of the season was the first win in school history.

=== Schedule ===
Date	Opponent	Site	Result	Attendance	Source
October 28	at Washington Agricultural	Soldier Field; Pullman, WA (rivalry)	L 0–11	500	
November 4	Whitman	Moscow, ID	L 6–16		
November 30	at Wallace Athletic Club	Wallace, ID	L 0–14		
December 2	at Lewiston Normal	Lewiston, ID	W 5–0		

External link

- The University Argonaut – student newspaper – 1899 editions
