= 1893–94 Oregon Agricultural Aggies football team =

American college football season

1893–94 Oregon Agricultural Aggies football

OIFA champion
- Conference: Oregon Intercollegiate Football Association
- Record: 5–1 (3–0 OIFA)
- Head coach: Will Bloss (1st season)
- Captain: Brady Burnett

1893 Far West college football independents records
	Conf.			Overall
Team	W	L	T	W		L		T
Stanford		–		8	–	0	–	1
Pacific University		–		2	–	0	–	0
Gonzaga		–		1	–	0	–	0
Saint Mary's		–		1	–	0	–	0
Wyoming		–		1	–	0	–	0
Oregon Agricultural		–		5	–	1	–	0
California		–		5	–	1	–	1
USC		–		3	–	1	–	0
Washington		–		1	–	3	–	1
Idaho		–		0	–	0	–	1
San Jose Normal		–		0	–	1	–	0
Albany College		–		0	–	1	–	0
Oregon State Normal		–		0	–	4	–	0

The 1893–94 Oregon Agricultural Aggies football team represented Oregon Agricultural College (OAC)—now known as Oregon State University—during the 1893 college football season. It was the school's inaugural football season and one in which not a single point was allowed in the four contests played on their home turf.

The team played a total of six games, finishing with a 5–1 record, and were regarded as the best collegiate team in the state of Oregon for the season.

== Background ==
In June 1900, the six literary societies of Oregon Agricultural College (OAC) in Corvallis, Oregon, published a special "souvenir edition" of The College Barometer, the monthly literary magazine of the school. This 64-page special issue included one of the earliest accounts of the saga of sports at the still-small school, "Some Athletic History," by J.C. McCaustland.

OAC "was one of the first educational institutions in Oregon to organize a foot-ball team and it has never failed to have one since," McCaustland wrote, noting that "in the fall of 1893, the first game of foot-ball was played on our campus by an organized team. He goes on to provide a list of opponents and scores, from whence subsequent records of the school's early football history have been subsequently derived.

With no incidental fees collected to cover basic costs, football and other sports at OAC were organized around a dues-paying organization called the Oregon Agricultural College Athletic Association (OACAA), which was incorporated in the fall of 1892.

The small size of the institution should be noted. Oregon Agricultural College became a state run school ahead of the 1888-89 academic year, with an initial enrollment of just 97 students, including a substantial percentage of women. By the 1893-94 academic year, that figure had crept up to 240 students in all — just 148 of whom were men. The seventeen players on the 1893 OAC team represented over 11% of the entire male student body.

Not everyone was keen on the emergence and growth of popularity of the "new" collegiate game in the region, with the neighboring Albany Herald-Disseminator reprinting a grim editorial from the San Francisco Chronicle which called for rules changes to curtail the roughness and brutality of the "so-called sport" which results in "broken and sprained limbs, in not infrequent internal injuries and sometimes in death." "Modern football is not football at all," the editorial declared. "It is a succession of rushes, of scrimmages, of wrestling matches, and sometimes of fist-fights, each side trying to bear down the other by sheer force of weight and strength."

== Schedule ==
Date	Opponent	Site	Result	Attendance	Source
November 11, 1893	Albany College (OR)	OAC Field; Corvallis, OR	W 64–0	500	
November 17, 1893	at Oregon State Normal	Monmouth, OR	W 36–22	300	
December 15, 1893	Oregon State Normal	OAC Field; Corvallis, OR	W 28–0		
January 20, 1894	Multnomah Athletic Club "Juniors"	OAC Field; Corvallis, OR	W 6–0	600	
February 3, 1894	Corvallis Athletic Association	OAC Field; Corvallis, OR	W 36–0	~ 250	
February 24, 1894	at Portland University	Multnomah Field; Portland	L 12–26	500	

== Game summaries ==
=== November 11: vs. Albany College ===
View of a game between OAC and Albany College, likely 1893.

November 11, 1893 marked the date of the first game of football played on the grounds of Oregon Agricultural College or in Benton County, Oregon itself, when the OAC Aggies met a rival squad fielded by their neighbors of Albany College.

The Albany team arrived in Corvallis at 11 am on game day aboard horse-drawn hacks and were conducted to Cauthorn Hall on the OAC campus for photographs and a team meal. The grounds were crowded with fans, with more than 500 people paying 10 cents each to attend. The game was reckoned as the largest crowd to ever view a sporting event in Corvallis.

As home team, Corvallis was responsible for the traveling expenses of the visitors, so tickets were sold for ten cents each, to be attached with orange ribbon to the lapel and worn in plain view while the spectator was on the football grounds.

The game began at 2 pm, with Albany receiving the ball but quickly losing possession, followed by the first touchdown, scored by halfback Brady Burnett after only four minutes had been played. The game that followed proved to be a rout, with the Aggies posting a 42-0 lead at halftime.

The Albany squad was so demoralized by the drubbing that three players would not take the field in the second half, with these non-participants replaced by OAC substitute players for the duration of the game. The final score in the contest was 64-0, with the Aggies racking up 13 four-point touchdowns: Burnett with 7, Nash with 4, Bloss 1, and Desborough 1.

Despite the outcome, the Albany team held no ill-will towards their gridiron betters, with one individual close to the Albany team opining in the local press:

"The football team was well treated, with all the word implies. The Agricultural fellows showed every courtesy and bent every energy to make our stay in their city pleasant and profitable. Fairness in the game and gentility elsewhere must be placed to the credit of the young men of Corvallis."

=== November 17: at Oregon State Normal School ===
According to a short item in the Albany Weekly Herald-Disseminator, a match between the state agricultural college and Oregon State Normal School was in the offing for Thanksgiving Day at the OAC football grounds. This proved inaccurate both with respect to timing and location, as the two college squads met on the gridiron on Friday, November 17, 1893, in Monmouth, Oregon. Playing in bad weather before a scant crowd of just 300 fans, the Aggies extended their record to 2-0 with a decisive 36–22 victory.

After hitting paydirt seven times in the opener, halfback Brady Burnett scored six more rushing touchdowns in OAC's second game of 1893.

Right halfback Brady Burnett was again the most effective offensive weapon for the Aggies as he ran the ball effectively behind the stout right side of the offensive line, with one observer noting that OAC "outplayed their opponents in every particular" by making use of "scientific playing" while the Monmouths "relied upon their muscle."

OSNS ran the ball effectively behind a "rolling wedge," with their halfbacks Bilyeu and Brodie both credited with outstanding games rushing the football. An early OAC score and conversion was answered by Monmouth's Bilyeu, who scored a four-point touchdown, with the subsequent kick for two-points after touchdown failing — leaving the score OAC 6, OSNS 4. The teams traded scores with the score standing Aggies 18, Monmouths 10 as the 45-minute first half came to a close.

A ten-minute intermission followed, with the spectators spending their time cheering and blowing horns in anticipation of second half action.

Monmouth received the ball to open the second half and drove it the length of the field in six minutes, scoring a 4-point touchdown and 2-point conversion kick to cut the Aggies' lead to 18-16. The Monmouth team could not hold, however, with the Aggies quickly answering with a Brady Burnett run around end to score his fourth touchdown of the day, extending the lead to 24-16. Yet another Burnett touchdown followed, a 100-yard run coming on a reverse play in which his backfield mate Nash ran the ball one way before handing it off to Burnett, who streaked around end in the other direction.

Following another OSNS touchdown to make the score 30-22, Captain Brady Burnett scored a sixth touchdown for the Aggies to cap the scoring at 36-22, with his score coming at the 34 minute mark of the second half. This final TD made an astounding 13 for Burnett in two games — a school performance unlikely to ever be equaled.

Following the game the two teams shared a meal at the OSNS dining hall.

Such was the view from Corvallis. Twenty-five miles north, some saw the gridiron contest between the Normals and the Agrics quite differently.

"Owing to the training the OAC boys had received, they seemed to think that anything that would help to win a foot ball game was fair, and they showed by their actions, that, if they could not win the game by fair playing, they would win it some other way," the reporter from the weekly West Side opined. The partisan observer found much to criticize about the Aggies' playing tactics, including the use of "slugging, throttling, kicking, tripping, jumping on a man when he is down, and all other unfair means that could be devised." Moreover, "to make matters worse the umpire...could not see any of the unfair plays..."

The crowd became unruly by halftime over perceived unfair treatment being meted out to the home team, the local newspaperman declared, adding that "had the Normal boys failed in controlling their tempers, there might have been serious trouble." The Agrics may have won the touchdown parade by three scores, but "had the game lasted fifteen minutes longer, with Professor Powell of Forest Grove as umpire, the OSNS boys would have won the game," the writer bitterly declared.

=== December 15: vs. Oregon State Normal School ===
Four weeks after their resounding victory at Monmouth, the farmers of OAC and the teachers of Oregon State Normal School met in Corvallis for a rematch. The game, poorly documented in the local press, was won 28-0 by the home team Aggies.

The game would be the last of Fall term at the college, with OAC finishing at the top of the "Oregon League" standings with a record of 3-0. Pacific University, the other Oregon school playing football in 1893, hit the break with a record of 2-0, while Monmouth closed at 0-4. The Albany program was wrecked by their initial disaster in Corvallis, tapping out of further action at the break with a record of 0-1.

=== New Year's Ball ===
Community spirit was high for the new OAC football team and they were guests of honor at the Corvallis opera house on New Year's Eve. Rosebrook's orchestra provided the music to dance to for the community of 1,500 people. The event was said to be "well attended" and "proved a success in every respect."

=== January 20, 1894: vs. Multnomah Athletic Club second team ===
Early in January 1894, the Agric football team received a challenge from the Multnomah Athletic Club "Juniors" (second team). A game was hastily scheduled for Friday, January 19, with the actual date contest later moved back one day to Saturday, January 20. As the home team, the Aggies were responsible for the traveling expenses of the Portland squad, with a sum of $100 agreed upon. Of this amount, a collection from professors of the school raised $30, with the remaining $70 to be generated by gate receipts.

The Multnomah Athletic Club arrived at 1 pm on game day aboard a special Oregon Pacific Railroad train sent down from Portland. The team was received at the station and taken to a dormitory where they were served lunch. Both teams entered the muddy field at 2:45 pm to begin the contest, which ultimately kicked off at 2:52 pm.

Game conditions were highly sub-optimum. One reporter opened his story in the poetry of Oregon: "In mud six inches deep and rain falling in torrents..."

Unsurprisingly, neither team could move the ball in the first half, with the Aggies gaining the best opportunity when they took over the ball on the Multnomahs' 20 yard line after the visitors turned over the ball on downs. As the Aggies drove toward the end zone, fullback R.W. Terrell fumbled the ball. Multnomah Athletic recovered but were driven into their own end zone for a two-point safety, with Aggie quarterback Will Bloss making the tackle. So the score stood at the end of the 30-minute first half: Oregon Agricultural College 2, Multnomah Athletic Club Juniors 0.

The OAC college band and the Telescope String Band of Albany entertained the crowd during the intermission, with horns and other noisemakers in evidence. Some 600 soaked spectators, men and women, stood throughout the entire game.

During the second half the Agrics received the ball and drove down the field, with quarterback Will Bloss popping one run for a twenty yard gain. Mixing their runs left, right, and center, the Aggies pushed the ball to the five yard line, which provided an opportunity for Captain Burnett to score the only touchdown of the game. The four points made the score 6-0, but Aggie kicker Desborough's effort for two points after touchdown sailed wide of the goalposts, keeping the Multnomahs in a one-score game.

Either side could move the ball against the other for the rest of the game, with Multnomah Athletic Club running out of time at the end of the game with the ball on the Aggies' fifteen yard line. Every courtesy had been allowed – the half had already been extended eight minutes to give the visitors a chance to score. Four Aggie players – Bloss, Burnett, Nash, and Small – played every play of the entire 60-minute game.

=== February 3: vs. Covallis Athletic Association ===
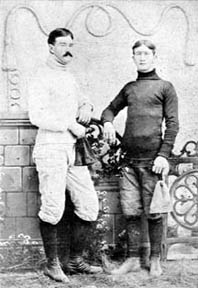
Will Bloss (left), son of OAC's president, was organizer, quarterback, coach, and manager of the 1893–94 Aggies team. Star halfback and team captain Brady Burnett is the other figure in this photo.

Fresh off their victory over the Multnomah Athletic Club junior team, on January 23 team manager Will Bloss announced that he was in receipt of a letter from the Multnomah Athletic Club senior team accepting the Aggies' challenge to play a game. The game between the Aggies and the Multnomah AC first team was tentatively scheduled for February 3. It was additionally announced that local football fans had raised $200 to purchase a silver trophy to award the OAC team for having won the state championship of the 1893–94 season. Tiffany of New York was contracted for the manufacture of the honorary silver cup.

Time proved to be too short to organize such a major event, however, so instead OAC did battle on February 3 against a newly organized team of young Corvallis men who were not affiliated with the college. Between two and three hundred people were in attendance to see the Aggies rout the upstart Corvallis team by a score of 36-0. About $20 was raised at the gate – money which was used to enclose the field in wire to keep back overwrought spectators who had crowded the field during previous contests.

=== February 24: at Portland University ===
The final game of the 1893–94 football season took place on February 24, 1894 on the road against Portland University, a fledgling Methodist private college started in 1891 following a split from Willamette University. Going into the game with a record of 5 wins and no losses, the OAC team and their backers were brimming with confidence over the prospect of an easy victory against an over-matched foe. OAC's focus was on bigger fish, a challenge having been issued to play Stanford University in the spring, with a local judge offering the Aggie team a $500 cash prize for a victory over their California counterparts. Overconfident and lacking focus, the team walked into the first "trap game" in school history, suffering a stunning loss in stumptown, falling 26-12.

The reporter of the Portland Oregonian was scornful, charging the Agrics were outclassed in the "fast and furious game" put up by the Portland boys. "Their defensive tactics were week, and they apparently relied more upon sheet brute strength and tricks than well-directed moves, figured out on a scientific basis," the journalist continued.

The field was deemed in "wretched condition, owing to the recent fall of snow." Three inches of sticky mud, covered with an additional inch of snow made for a slow, slippery track. Corvallis took a 12–8 lead to the halftime break, but gave up 18 unanswered points, with Portland backs Maddy and Washburn racking up three touchdowns to defeat the Orangemen handily.

Fans being fans, rumors and conspiracy theories swirled in the aftermath of the bitter season-ending loss. "The opposing team had the benefit of practice with a team that had previously learnt by bitter experience how the 'hayseeds' played, and what tricks, signals, etc., they used," one partisan declared. "The tricks that our boys expected to use to advantage in the Portland game, it appears, were therefore all known and expected by the University team. The best men of our team had been singled out, and it was a case of 'die, villain' when the game commenced."

Moreover, the orange-bleeding fan added fantastically, "another fact now known is that a Portland man was in Corvallis for two weeks before the game, taking notes on our team."

The anticipated road game against Stanford never materialized and Oregon Agricultural College finished their inaugural season with a record of 5 wins and 1 defeat. The small community of Corvallis was well-pleased with the new athletic diversion, presenting the team with an engraved silver cup valued at $125 (more than $4,500 in 2025 dollars).

== Roster ==
Team photo of the 1893-94 OAC football team. Back Row (L-R): H.W. Kelley, A. Lambert, T. Beall, A. Buchanan, W. Abernathy, C. Jones — reserves. Center Row: C. Small, J.F. Fulton, H. Desborough, H. McAlister, D.H. Bodine, A.D. Nash, C. Owsley — starting linemen. Front Row: Ralph Terrill, Will Bloss (with ball), Percival Nash, Brady Burnett — starting backs.

The starting 11 for the November 11, 1893, debut of collegiate football at OAC were:

- Charles Owsley, left end
- John Fulton, left tackle
- F. Gorrell, left guard
- Harvey "Pap Hayseed" McAlister, center
- Henry M. Desborough, right guard (and kicker)
- Mark "Clyde" Phillips, right tackle
- Charles Small, right end
- Will H. Bloss, quarterback
- Percival Nash, left halfback
- Brady F. Burnett, right halfback (Captain)
- Ralph W. Terrill, fullback

(Note: Players played both offensively and defensively in this era, as with soccer, rugby, or basketball.)

Starting in game two was:

- C. Chandler, left tackle

with additional reserves:

- Thomas Beall
- Arthur E. Buchanan
- Daniel H. Bodine
- E.G. Emmett
- A.D. Nash

== See also ==
- History of Oregon Agricultural Aggies baseball in the 1890s
