= Pacific Tigers football, 1895–1899 =

American college football seasons

The Pacific Tigers football program from 1895 to 1899 represented the University of the Pacific in its first decade of college football competition. After the 1899 season, Pacific did not field a football team again until 1919.

== 1895 ==
1895 Pacific Tigers football
- Conference: Independent
- Record: 0–0–1

1895 Far West college football independents records
	Conf.			Overall
Team	W	L	T	W		L		T
Occidental		–		5	–	0	–	0
New Mexico A&M		–		2	–	0	–	0
Washington Agricultural		–		2	–	0	–	0
Gonzaga		–		1	–	0	–	0
Wyoming		–		1	–	0	–	0
Stanford		–		4	–	0	–	1
Washington		–		4	–	0	–	1
California		–		3	–	1	–	1
Pacific (CA)		–		0	–	0	–	1
Saint Mary's		–		1	–	1	–	0
San Jose Normal		–		0	–	0	–	1
USC		–		0	–	1	–	1
Idaho		–		0	–	1	–	0
Utah		–		0	–	1	–	0

The 1895 Pacific Tigers football team represented the University of the Pacific as an independent during the 1895 college football season. In their first game in program history, the Tigers tied San Jose Normal 6 to 6 in January 1896. The game took place during the 1895–96 academic year

=== Schedule ===
Date	Opponent	Site	Result	Source
January 25, 1896	San Jose Normal	San Jose, CA (rivalry)	T 6–6	

== 1898 ==
1898 Pacific Tigers football
- Conference: Independent
- Record: 0–2

1898 Far West college football independents records
	Conf.			Overall
Team	W	L	T	W		L		T
San Jose Normal		–		5	–	0	–	1
California		–		8	–	0	–	2
Nevada State		–		4	–	1	–	0
USC		–		5	–	1	–	1
Gonzaga		–		1	–	0	–	1
Oregon		–		3	–	1	–	0
New Mexico A&M		–		2	–	1	–	0
Utah		–		2	–	1	–	0
Stanford		–		5	–	3	–	1
Montana		–		3	–	2	–	0
Saint Mary's		–		3	–	2	–	0
Denver		–		6	–	4	–	1
Washington		–		1	–	1	–	0
Oregon Agricultural		–		1	–	2	–	1
Washington Agricultural		–		0	–	0	–	1
Utah Agricultural		–		0	–	1	–	0
Montana Agricultural		–		0	–	2	–	0
Pacific (CA)		–		0	–	0	–	2
Wyoming		–		0	–	4	–	0

The 1898 Pacific Tigers football team represented the University of the Pacific as an independent during the 1898 college football season.

=== Schedule ===
Date	Opponent	Site	Result	Source
	San Jose Normal	Cyclers' Park; San Jose, CA (rivalry)	L 0–18	
October 27	vs. Nevada State	Cyclers' Park; San Jose, CA	L 0–35	

== 1899 ==
1899 Pacific Tigers football
- Conference: Independent
- Record: 0–4

1899 Far West college football independents records
	Conf.			Overall
Team	W	L	T	W		L		T
Montana Agricultural		–		3	–	0	–	0
Arizona Normal		–		3	–	0	–	0
New Mexico A&M		–		1	–	0	–	0
Utah Agricultural		–		1	–	0	–	0
California		–		7	–	1	–	1
Washington		–		4	–	1	–	1
Utah		–		2	–	1	–	0
San Jose Normal		–		6	–	3	–	1
Nevada State		–		3	–	2	–	0
Oregon Agricultural		–		3	–	2	–	0
Oregon		–		3	–	2	–	1
Arizona		–		1	–	1	–	1
Washington Agricultural		–		1	–	1	–	0
Montana		–		1	–	2	–	0
Idaho		–		1	–	3	–	0
USC		–		2	–	3	–	1
Stanford		–		2	–	5	–	2
Wyoming		–		0	–	1	–	1
Pacific (CA)		–		0	–	4	–	0

The 1899 Pacific Tigers football team represented the University of the Pacific as an independent during the 1899 college football season.

=== Schedule ===
Date	Time	Opponent	Site	Result	Source
September 26		San Jose Normal	San Jose, CA (rivalry)	L 0–5	
September 30		Santa Clara High School	San Jose, CA	L 0–22	
October 14	2:15 p.m.	Nevada State	Evans Field; Reno, NV	L 5–63	
November 18		Palo Alto High School	San Jose, CA	L 6–10	
