= 1899 USC Methodists football team =

American college football season

1899 USC Methodists football
- Conference: Independent
- Record: 2–3–1
- Head coach: None
- Captain: Logan Wheatley

1899 Far West college football independents records
	Conf.			Overall
Team	W	L	T	W		L		T
Montana Agricultural		–		3	–	0	–	0
Arizona Normal		–		3	–	0	–	0
New Mexico A&M		–		1	–	0	–	0
Utah Agricultural		–		1	–	0	–	0
California		–		7	–	1	–	1
Washington		–		4	–	1	–	1
Utah		–		2	–	1	–	0
San Jose Normal		–		6	–	3	–	1
Nevada State		–		3	–	2	–	0
Oregon Agricultural		–		3	–	2	–	0
Oregon		–		3	–	2	–	1
Arizona		–		1	–	1	–	1
Washington Agricultural		–		1	–	1	–	0
Montana		–		1	–	2	–	0
Idaho		–		1	–	3	–	0
USC		–		2	–	3	–	1
Stanford		–		2	–	5	–	2
Wyoming		–		0	–	1	–	1
Pacific (CA)		–		0	–	4	–	0

The 1899 USC Methodists football team was an American football team that represented the University of Southern California during the 1899 college football season. The team competed as an independent without a head coach, compiling a 2–3–1 record.

== Schedule ==
Date	Opponent	Site	Result	Attendance
October 21	Whittier	Los Angeles, CA	W 11–0	
November 4	at Santa Ana High School	Santa Ana, CA	L 0–11	
November 8	Occidental	Los Angeles, CA	W 11–0	
November 15	Occidental	Los Angeles, CA	T 0–0	
November 30	at Pomona	Pomona, CA	L 0–12	2,000
January 1	at Santa Barbara AC	Santa Barbara, CA	L 0–10	
