= 1899 University of Utah football team =

American college football season

1899 University of Utah football
- Conference: Independent
- Record: 2–1
- Head coach: Charles Gatehouse (1st season)
- Home stadium: University campus, Walker's Field

1899 Far West college football independents records
	Conf.			Overall
Team	W	L	T	W		L		T
Montana Agricultural		–		3	–	0	–	0
Arizona Normal		–		3	–	0	–	0
New Mexico A&M		–		1	–	0	–	0
Utah Agricultural		–		1	–	0	–	0
California		–		7	–	1	–	1
Washington		–		4	–	1	–	1
Utah		–		2	–	1	–	0
San Jose Normal		–		6	–	3	–	1
Nevada State		–		3	–	2	–	0
Oregon Agricultural		–		3	–	2	–	0
Oregon		–		3	–	2	–	1
Arizona		–		1	–	1	–	1
Washington Agricultural		–		1	–	1	–	0
Montana		–		1	–	2	–	0
Idaho		–		1	–	3	–	0
USC		–		2	–	3	–	1
Stanford		–		2	–	5	–	2
Wyoming		–		0	–	1	–	1
Pacific (CA)		–		0	–	4	–	0

The 1889 University of Utah football team was an American football team that represented the University of Utah as an independent during the 1899 college football season. Head coach Charles Gatehouse led the team to a 2–1 record.

== Schedule ==
Date	Time	Opponent	Site	Result	Attendance	Source
November 3		at 9th Cavalry	Fort Douglas; Salt Lake City, UT	W 18–0		
November 13	3:30 p.m.	9th Cavalry	University campus; Salt Lake City, UT	W 5–0		
November 25	3:00 p.m.	Salt Lake City High School	Walker's Field; Salt Lake City, UT	L 0–34	1,000	
