= 1899 San Jose Normal football team =

American college football season

1899 San Jose Normal football
- Conference: Independent
- Record: 6–3–1
- Head coach: Jess Woods (1st season)
- Home stadium: Cyclers' Park

1899 Far West college football independents records
	Conf.			Overall
Team	W	L	T	W		L		T
Montana Agricultural		–		3	–	0	–	0
Arizona Normal		–		3	–	0	–	0
New Mexico A&M		–		1	–	0	–	0
Utah Agricultural		–		1	–	0	–	0
California		–		7	–	1	–	1
Washington		–		4	–	1	–	1
Utah		–		2	–	1	–	0
San Jose Normal		–		6	–	3	–	1
Nevada State		–		3	–	2	–	0
Oregon Agricultural		–		3	–	2	–	0
Oregon		–		3	–	2	–	1
Arizona		–		1	–	1	–	1
Washington Agricultural		–		1	–	1	–	0
Montana		–		1	–	2	–	0
Idaho		–		1	–	3	–	0
USC		–		2	–	3	–	1
Stanford		–		2	–	5	–	2
Wyoming		–		0	–	1	–	1
Pacific (CA)		–		0	–	4	–	0

The 1899 San Jose Normal football team represented California State Normal School—now known as San Jose State University—as an independent during the 1899 college football season. In their its season under head coach Jess Woods, San Jose Normal compiled a 6–3–1 record. The season was highlighted by a record number of wins (six) and losses (three). The team outscored opponents 119 to 69, although it was outscored 56 to 11 by collegiate teams.

== Schedule ==
Date	Time	Opponent	Site	Result	Source
September 26		at Pacific (CA)	San Jose, CA (rivalry)	W 5–0	
September 29		at Stanford freshmen	Stanford, CA	W 6–0	
October 7		Santa Clara High School	San Jose, CA	W 23–0	
October 14	2:00 p.m.	at Palo Alto High School	Stanford, CA	W 17–0	
October 21		Hoitt's Academy	San Jose, CA	W 27–0	
October 28		Saint Matthews School	San Jose, CA	W 35–12	
November 11		Belmont Prep School	San Jose, CA	L (forfeit)	
November 22		at California	Berkeley, CA	L 0–44	
November 30	2:00 p.m.	at Nevada State	Reno, NV	L 0–6	
December 13		Santa Clara	Cyclers' Park; San Jose, CA	T 6–6	
