= 1899 Arizona football team =

American college football season

1899 Arizona football
- Conference: Independent
- Record: 1–1–1
- Head coach: Stuart Forbes (1st season)
- Captain: George M. Parker

1899 Far West college football independents records
	Conf.			Overall
Team	W	L	T	W		L		T
Montana Agricultural		–		3	–	0	–	0
Arizona Normal		–		3	–	0	–	0
New Mexico A&M		–		1	–	0	–	0
Utah Agricultural		–		1	–	0	–	0
California		–		7	–	1	–	1
Washington		–		4	–	1	–	1
Utah		–		2	–	1	–	0
San Jose Normal		–		6	–	3	–	1
Nevada State		–		3	–	2	–	0
Oregon Agricultural		–		3	–	2	–	0
Oregon		–		3	–	2	–	1
Arizona		–		1	–	1	–	1
Washington Agricultural		–		1	–	1	–	0
Montana		–		1	–	2	–	0
Idaho		–		1	–	3	–	0
USC		–		2	–	3	–	1
Stanford		–		2	–	5	–	2
Wyoming		–		0	–	1	–	1
Pacific (CA)		–		0	–	4	–	0

The 1899 Arizona football team was an American football team that represented the University of Arizona as an independent during the 1899 college football season. In its first season of football, the team compiled a 1–1–1 record and outscored all opponents, 24 to 16. The team was organized in January 1899 by Professor R. H. Forbes, but no games were played until the fall when a student committee raised $70 from merchants in the Old Pueblo to purchase uniforms. Stuart Forbes was the team's coach, George M. Parker was the manager and team captain. The team's colors during the 1899 season were sage green and silver.

== Schedule ==
Date	Opponent	Site	Result	Attendance
November 20	Tucson town team	Tucson, Arizona Territory	T 0–0	
November 30	Normal School of Arizona	Carillo Gardens; Tucson, Arizona Territory	L 2–11	300
January 13	Tucson Indians	Tucson, Arizona Territory	W 22–0	

== Game summaries ==
On November 20, 1899, the University of Arizona football team played its first official football game, after an earlier practice game against a Tucson, Arizona, town team. The November 20 game, also played against a Tucson town team, ended in a scoreless tie.

On November 30, 1899, the team played its first intercollegiate football game against the Normal School of Arizona (later renamed Arizona State University). The inaugural meeting in the Arizona–Arizona State football rivalry ended in an 11–2 score in favor of the Tempe team. The game was played in front of an estimated 300 spectators at the Carillo Gardens amusement center near the Santa Cruz River in Tucson.

The team's third game was played on January 13, 1900, against the football team from the Tucson Indian School. The University team won that game by a 22 to 0 score.

== Players ==
The team's roster included the following players: Willard Morse Brown, Duncan Hugh Campbell, Rudolph Castaneda, Courtland F. Day, Frank Wakefield Fish, John Garnett Holmes, Thomas K. Marshall, William Thomas Olney, Charles P. Richmond, James Newton Robinson, Guy Lionel Rockwell, Ross M. Russell, Edward S. Stafford, and Benito G. Suarez. Another account lists players with the surnames French and Parker.
