= 1899 Wyoming Cowboys football team =

American college football season

1899 Wyoming Cowboys football
- Conference: Independent
- Record: 0–1–1
- Head coach: Justus F. Soule (5th season)
- Captain: Fred Brees

1899 Far West college football independents records
	Conf.			Overall
Team	W	L	T	W		L		T
Montana Agricultural		–		3	–	0	–	0
Arizona Normal		–		3	–	0	–	0
New Mexico A&M		–		1	–	0	–	0
Utah Agricultural		–		1	–	0	–	0
California		–		7	–	1	–	1
Washington		–		4	–	1	–	1
Utah		–		2	–	1	–	0
San Jose Normal		–		6	–	3	–	1
Nevada State		–		3	–	2	–	0
Oregon Agricultural		–		3	–	2	–	0
Oregon		–		3	–	2	–	1
Arizona		–		1	–	1	–	1
Washington Agricultural		–		1	–	1	–	0
Montana		–		1	–	2	–	0
Idaho		–		1	–	3	–	0
USC		–		2	–	3	–	1
Stanford		–		2	–	5	–	2
Wyoming		–		0	–	1	–	1
Pacific (CA)		–		0	–	4	–	0

The 1899 Wyoming Cowboys football team represented the University of Wyoming as an independent during the 1899 college football season. In its fifth non-consecutive season under head coach Justus F. Soule, a professor of Latin and Greek, the team compiled a 0–1–1 record. Fred Brees was the team captain.

== Schedule ==
Date	Opponent	Site	Result
November 30	at Colorado Agricultural	Laramie, WY	L 0–12 (forfeit)
December 16	Colorado State Normal	Laramie, WY	T 5–5

== Game summaries ==
The 1899 season included the first scheduled game with Colorado Agricultural College (now known as Colorado State University), a series that became Wyoming's oldest rivalry, now known as the Border War. In the game, a disagreement between officials from the two schools resulted in a controversial ending to the game, sparking a rivalry that has lasted to this day.

At the time, officials were provided by the schools competing in the game. The game concluded with a Wyoming forfeit being called after Colorado Agricultural official Edward House ruled that Wyoming official E.D. McArthur and the Wyoming team were refusing to abide by the rulebook. After the forfeit was called and the Colorado Agricultural players began leaving the field, official McArthur reportedly exclaimed that he "did not give a damn for the rules" and instructed the Wyoming team to run in a touchdown. This action reportedly set off a brawl between the teams.

Following the game, Colorado Agricultural President Barton Aylesworth declared that his school would not play Wyoming in any athletic event until he received a written apology from the school. The two schools played again the following year, and there has remained bad blood between the two programs since. Per an NCAA rule that does not recognize forfeits in games that were incomplete, Colorado State University does not count the game as a victory in their record books.
