= 1899 Utah Agricultural Aggies football team =

American college football season

1899 Utah Agricultural Aggies football
- Conference: Independent
- Record: 1–0
- Head coach: Willard Langton (1st season)

1899 Far West college football independents records
| | Conf. | | | Overall |
| Team | W | L | T | W | | L | | T |
|---|---|---|---|---|---|---|---|---|
| Montana Agricultural | | – | | 3 | – | 0 | – | 0 |
| Arizona Normal | | – | | 3 | – | 0 | – | 0 |
| New Mexico A&M | | – | | 1 | – | 0 | – | 0 |
| Utah Agricultural | | – | | 1 | – | 0 | – | 0 |
| California | | – | | 7 | – | 1 | – | 1 |
| Washington | | – | | 4 | – | 1 | – | 1 |
| Utah | | – | | 2 | – | 1 | – | 0 |
| San Jose Normal | | – | | 6 | – | 3 | – | 1 |
| Nevada State | | – | | 3 | – | 2 | – | 0 |
| Oregon Agricultural | | – | | 3 | – | 2 | – | 0 |
| Oregon | | – | | 3 | – | 2 | – | 1 |
| Arizona | | – | | 1 | – | 1 | – | 1 |
| Washington Agricultural | | – | | 1 | – | 1 | – | 0 |
| Montana | | – | | 1 | – | 2 | – | 0 |
| Idaho | | – | | 1 | – | 3 | – | 0 |
| USC | | – | | 2 | – | 3 | – | 1 |
| Stanford | | – | | 2 | – | 5 | – | 2 |
| Wyoming | | – | | 0 | – | 1 | – | 1 |
| Pacific (CA) | | – | | 0 | – | 4 | – | 0 |

The 1899 Utah Agricultural Aggies football team was an American football team that represented Utah Agricultural College (later renamed Utah State University) during the 1899 college football season. In their first season under head coach Willard Langton, the Aggies compiled a 1–0 record.

On November 4, 1899, the team defeated Brigham Young College by an 11–5 score before a crowd of 500 spectators at Logan, Utah. The game was played in 20-minute halves. Bowen scored a touchdown for the Aggies after four minutes had been played, and the attempt at kick for goal was unsuccessful. William Nelson scored the Aggies' second touchdown in the second half, and Laughney kicked the goal from touchdown.

== Schedule ==
| Date | Opponent | Site | Result | Attendance | Source |
|---|---|---|---|---|---|
| November 4 | Brigham Young College | Logan, UT | W 11–5 | 500 | |
