= 1899 Oregon Webfoots football team =

American college football season

1899 Oregon Webfoots football
- Oregon team at Multnomah Field, Portland
- Conference: Independent
- Record: 3–2–1
- Head coach: Frank W. Simpson (2nd season)
- Captain: Richard Shore Smith
- Home stadium: Kincaid Field

1899 Far West college football independents records
	Conf.			Overall
Team	W	L	T	W		L		T
Montana Agricultural		–		3	–	0	–	0
Arizona Normal		–		3	–	0	–	0
New Mexico A&M		–		1	–	0	–	0
Utah Agricultural		–		1	–	0	–	0
California		–		7	–	1	–	1
Washington		–		4	–	1	–	1
Utah		–		2	–	1	–	0
San Jose Normal		–		6	–	3	–	1
Nevada State		–		3	–	2	–	0
Oregon Agricultural		–		3	–	2	–	0
Oregon		–		3	–	2	–	1
Arizona		–		1	–	1	–	1
Washington Agricultural		–		1	–	1	–	0
Montana		–		1	–	2	–	0
Idaho		–		1	–	3	–	0
USC		–		2	–	3	–	1
Stanford		–		2	–	5	–	2
Wyoming		–		0	–	1	–	1
Pacific (CA)		–		0	–	4	–	0

The 1899 Oregon Webfoots football team represented the University of Oregon in the 1899 college football season. It was the Webfoots' sixth season and were led by head coach Frank W. Simpson in his second year.

Oregon competed in 1899 as part of the Oregon Intercollegiate Football Association (OIFA) before quitting the league midseason, together with Oregon Agricultural College, over a roster-stuffing scandal allegedly perpetrated by Willamette University. Oregon ended the season with a record of three wins, two losses and one tie (3–2–1).

== Schedule ==
Date	Time	Opponent	Site	Result	Attendance	Source
November 4	3:00 p.m.	Chemawa	Kincaid Field; Eugene, OR	W 29–0		
November 11		at Multnomah Athletic Club	Multnomah Field; Portland, OR	L 0–5		
November 18	3:20 p.m.	at California	Berkeley, CA	L 0–12	2,000	
November 21	2:00 p.m.	at Southern Oregon Normal	Ashland, OR	W 35–0		
November 25		at Multnomah Athletic Club	Multnomah Field; Portland, OR	T 0–0		
November 30		Oregon Agricultural	Kincaid Field; Eugene, OR (rivalry)	W 38–0		
All times are in Pacific time

== Roster ==
Ends
• Young
• Zeigler

Tackles
• Jackway
• Richard Shore Smith (captain)

Guards
• Angell
• Spalding
• Waddell

Center
• Wagner

Quarterbacks
• Edwards

Halfbacks
• Bishop
• Hammond
• Knox

Fullbacks
• Payne

Substitutes
• Dodge
• Ford
• Goodall
• Moist
