= 1899 Oregon Agricultural Aggies football team =

American college football season

1899 Oregon Agricultural Aggies football
- Conference: OIFA / independent
- Record: 3–2 ( OIFA / independent)
- Head coach: Hiland Stickney (1st season)
- Captain: Fred C. Walters
- Home stadium: OAC Field

1899 Far West college football independents records
	Conf.			Overall
Team	W	L	T	W		L		T
Montana Agricultural		–		3	–	0	–	0
Arizona Normal		–		3	–	0	–	0
New Mexico A&M		–		1	–	0	–	0
Utah Agricultural		–		1	–	0	–	0
California		–		7	–	1	–	1
Washington		–		4	–	1	–	1
Utah		–		2	–	1	–	0
San Jose Normal		–		6	–	3	–	1
Nevada State		–		3	–	2	–	0
Oregon Agricultural		–		3	–	2	–	0
Oregon		–		3	–	2	–	1
Arizona		–		1	–	1	–	1
Washington Agricultural		–		1	–	1	–	0
Montana		–		1	–	2	–	0
Idaho		–		1	–	3	–	0
USC		–		2	–	3	–	1
Stanford		–		2	–	5	–	2
Wyoming		–		0	–	1	–	1
Pacific (CA)		–		0	–	4	–	0

The 1899 Oregon Agricultural Aggies football team represented Oregon Agricultural College (OAC)—now known as Oregon State University—during the 1899 college football season. In their first and only season under head coach Hiland Orlando Stickney, the Aggies compiled a record of 3–2 and outscored their opponents 76 to 60. The Aggies lost to Oregon, 38–0. Fred Walters was the team captain.

The Oregon Intercollegiate Football Association (OIFA) collapsed mid-season when OAC and Oregon left amidst allegations that Willamette was stacking its roster with "ringers" who were not students of the school.

== Schedule ==
Date	Time	Opponent	Site	Result	Source
November 4		Willamette	OAC Field; Corvallis, OR	W 10–0	
November 11	3:00 p.m.	Albany College (OR)	OAC Field; Corvallis, OR	W 47–0	
November 18		Multnomah Athletic Club	OAC Field; Corvallis, OR	L 0–5	
November 25		Chemawa	OAC Field; Corvallis, OR	W 18–17	
November 30		at Oregon	Kincaid Field; Eugene, OR (rivalry)	L 0–38	

== Game summaries ==
=== Cancelled: Albany College ===
A season-opening game with neighboring Albany College — today's Lewis & Clark College — had been planned for Saturday, October 28. However, just over one week ahead of the game, the match was cancelled by the captain of Albany College, with a published news report indicating that Albany declined to meet OAC on the gridiron "on any conditions whatever." The reason may have been related to lack of preparedness so early in the season, with new coach E.E. McClannahan said to have arrived in Albany only five days previously.

=== Game 1: Willamette ===
In one of what one observer called "one of the prettiest and liveliest games ever witnessed on the gridiron," the OAC Aggies defeated the Willamette Bearcats in a "practice game" by a score of 10–0. The game was 45 minutes long, with two unequal halves — 20 minutes before intermission and 25 minutes after.

The Aggies scored one touchdown in the first half but missed the conversion, taking a 5–0 lead to halftime. A second OAC touchdown was added near the end of the game, although again the extra point attempt failed. According to a report in a friendly Salem newspaper, "throughout the game the Salem players had no problem piercing the line of the opposing team almost at will, but a number of fumbles at critical stages of the game were costly and prevented the team from scoring."

=== Game 2: Albany College ===
Oregon Agricultural College and Albany College met at last on November 11 in Corvallis. It quickly became evident on the field why Albany was so hesitant to meet OAC two weeks earlier — the game proved to be a one-sided wipe-out in which Albany failed to gain even one first-down during what was planned to be a regulation 70-minute contest.

The Orange scored their first touchdown after just two minutes of game action following Albany turning over the ball on downs deep in their own end. The 20-yard touchdown run by Goodrich was just OAC's second play from scrimmage and set the tone for the afternoon. Eight minutes later, following another surrender of the ball on downs by Albany leading to a protracted drive by the home team, OAC scored again, this time on a short run by Hall, who also successfully kicked the extra point to make the score 11–0.

Thereafter the teams traded possessions until at the 19-minute mark the Orange found paydirt for a third time, this time on an end run by Belt, with a successful conversion kick by Hall run the score to 17–0. Albany kicked off after the touchdown and on the next play from scrimmage OAC was in the end zone again, this time on a 64-yard run by McCaustland, with Belt and Hall throwing the key blocks on the run. Hall once again converted and Albany found themselves looking at a 23–0 deficit.

Another Albany kickoff was followed by another Aggie drive, with runs of 20 yards by Belt, 15 yards by Goodrich, and 15 yards by Hall setting up Goodrich for his second touchdown of the day, this one around end. After the conversion the score was 29–0. Just 3:45 later, the Orange were in the end zone again, this time with Walters doing the honors, bringing the score to 35–0 at the half. Play was halted after just 30 minutes.

Having gained no first downs all afternoon and looking at a 6 touchdown deficit, Albany College was ready to run up the white flag. The captains agreed to play a second "half" just 15 minutes in duration. OAC substituted out several starters in an attempt to keep the score manageable but Walters scored again at the 6-minute mark, bringing the tally to 41–0. Substitute back Noel scored again for OAC on an end run at the 11 minute mark, bringing the score after the successful conversion to 47–0, which stood as the final result.

The second half was ended after just 13 minutes, bringing the total game duration to only 43 minutes.

=== Cancelled: Willamette ===
An official rematch between OAC and Willamette University was arranged by the two club managers on November 13, slated to be played in Salem that Saturday, November 18. Arrangements were to be made for a special train to run between Corvallis and Salem in conjunction with the event. The winner of the game was to meet the University of Oregon on Thanksgiving Day to determine a state collegiate football champion. This plan proved short-lived, however, being cancelled the next day.

Allegations arose that "ringers" had been enrolled at Willamette "for the sole purpose of playing football," prompting the University of Oregon and OAC to withdraw abruptly and jointly from the Oregon Intercollegiate Football Association (OIFA)

A story in the Eugene Guard declared:

"It is said that no less than eight of Willamette's eleven are 'grafters.' 'Spike' Young occupies a fat job in the state house; Ruben Sanders comes up from Chemawa for daily practice; Savage, a Salem blacksmith; two practicing physicians, two asylum employees. These are samples of the 'students' that play under Willamette colors."

With the Saturday, November 18 date suddenly freed, OAC team manager James H. Gallagher hastily booked a match between the Orange and the football team of the Multnomah Athletic Club, to be held in Corvallis on that date.

From Salem came claims that OAC had developed a case of "cold feet" and rather than face the "humiliation of defeat" at the hands of a superior Willamette squad the Orangemen had enlisted the University of Oregon to go along with the "juvenile prank" of quitting the association. "The Salem team ... entered the league in good faith, organized a team of the very best material available, employed a competent coach, and has been practicing very assiduously," it was noted — only to face the withdrawal of its two leading in-state competitors. Willamette therefore claimed the pennant of the Oregon Intercollegiate Football League as champion as its own by default.

=== Game 5: Oregon ===
Originally Thanksgiving, Thursday, November 30, 1899, was slated to be an OIFA championship game between the Oregon Webfoots and the winner of the November 18 contest between Willamette University and OAC. This was cancelled in the aftermath of the Willamette football "ringer" scandal, as a part of which U of O and OAC had proclaimed all agreements between themselves and the league to be "null and void." Instead, OAC manager James Gallagher and U of O manager Luke L. Goodrich, scheduled a Thanksgiving Day game of their own, to be held in Eugene.
