= 1899 Washington football team =

American college football season

1899 Washington football
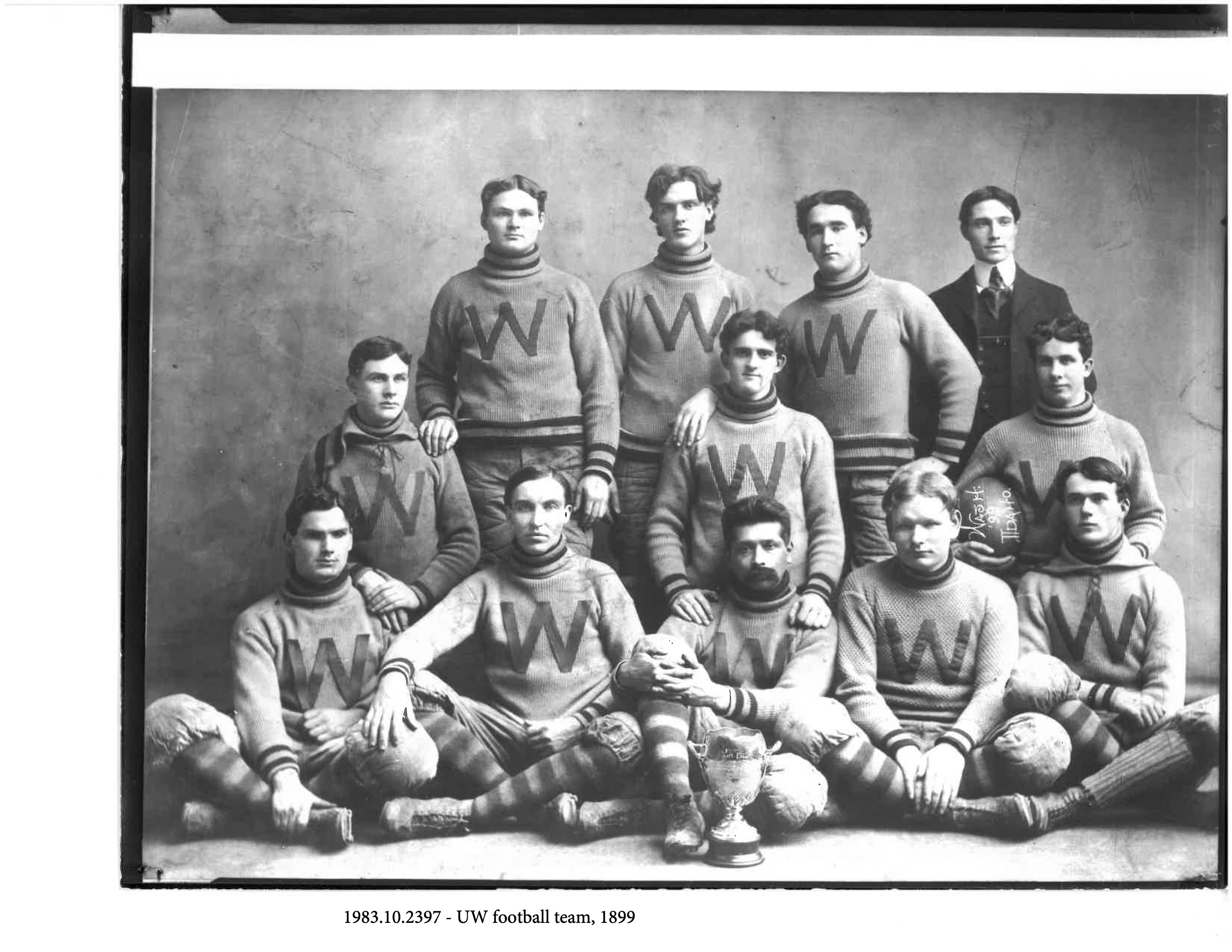

Champions of Washington and Idaho
- Conference: Independent
- Record: 4–1–1
- Head coach: A. S. Jeffs (1st season)
- Captain: Sterling Hill
- Home stadium: YMCA Park

1899 Far West college football independents records
	Conf.			Overall
Team	W	L	T	W		L		T
Montana Agricultural		–		3	–	0	–	0
Arizona Normal		–		3	–	0	–	0
New Mexico A&M		–		1	–	0	–	0
Utah Agricultural		–		1	–	0	–	0
California		–		7	–	1	–	1
Washington		–		4	–	1	–	1
Utah		–		2	–	1	–	0
San Jose Normal		–		6	–	3	–	1
Nevada State		–		3	–	2	–	0
Oregon Agricultural		–		3	–	2	–	0
Oregon		–		3	–	2	–	1
Arizona		–		1	–	1	–	1
Washington Agricultural		–		1	–	1	–	0
Montana		–		1	–	2	–	0
Idaho		–		1	–	3	–	0
USC		–		2	–	3	–	1
Stanford		–		2	–	5	–	2
Wyoming		–		0	–	1	–	1
Pacific (CA)		–		0	–	4	–	0

The 1899 Washington football team was an American football team that represented the University of Washington as an independent during the 1899 college football season. In its first season under coach A. S. Jeffs, the team compiled a 4–1–1 record and outscored its opponents by a combined total of 71 to 21. Sterling Hill was the team captain.

The Thanksgiving Day game vs. Whitman was promoted as the Championship of Washington and Idaho. Klondike Gold Rush millionaire T. S. Lippy awarded an engraved silver cup to the winner of the contest.

== Schedule ==
Date	Time	Opponent	Site	Result	Attendance	Source
October 14	1:30 p.m.	Port Townsend High School	YMCA Park; Seattle, WA	W 16–0	500	
October 28		at Port Townsend Athletic Club	Port Townsend, WA	L 0–11	250	
November 4		at Everett Athletic Club	Everett, WA	W 33–0	150	
November 7	3:00 p.m.	All-Seattle	YMCA Park; Seattle, WA	T 5–5	500	
November 18		Wilson's Modern Business College	YMCA Park; Seattle, WA	W 11–0	500	
November 30	1:30 p.m.	Whitman	YMCA Park; Seattle, WA (Championship of Washington and Idaho)	W 6–5	1,000	
