= Montana Agricultural football, 1897–1899 =

American college football seasons

The Montana Agricultural football teams (later known as the Montana State Bobcats) represented the Agricultural College of the State of Montana (now known as Montana State University) in college football from the program's founding in 1897 to 1899. During this period, the school played high schools and had a record of two wins and three losses against their rival, the University of Montana.

== 1897 ==
1897 Montana Agricultural football
- Conference: Independent
- Record: 1–3
- Head coach: Charles Lisle (1st season)
- Home stadium: Butler Field

1897 Far West college football independents records
| | Conf. | | | Overall |
| Team | W | L | T | W | | L | | T |
|---|---|---|---|---|---|---|---|---|
| Oregon Agricultural | | – | | 5 | – | 0 | – | 0 |
| Washington Agricultural | | – | | 2 | – | 0 | – | 0 |
| Wyoming | | – | | 2 | – | 0 | – | 0 |
| USC | | – | | 5 | – | 1 | – | 0 |
| Stanford | | – | | 4 | – | 1 | – | 0 |
| New Mexico A&M | | – | | 1 | – | 0 | – | 1 |
| Oregon | | – | | 1 | – | 1 | – | 0 |
| Montana | | – | | 1 | – | 2 | – | 3 |
| Washington | | – | | 1 | – | 2 | – | 0 |
| Montana Agricultural | | – | | 1 | – | 3 | – | 0 |
| California | | – | | 0 | – | 3 | – | 2 |
| Utah | | – | | 1 | – | 5 | – | 0 |
| Arizona Normal | | – | | 0 | – | 1 | – | 0 |
| Idaho | | – | | 0 | – | 1 | – | 0 |
| Nevada State | | – | | 0 | – | 1 | – | 0 |

The 1897 Montana Agricultural football team was an American football team that represented the Agricultural College of the State of Montana (later renamed Montana State University) during the 1897 college football season. Led by Charles Lisle in his only season as head coach, they had a 1–3 record in their innugural season.

=== Schedule ===
| Date | Opponent | Site | Result | Source |
|---|---|---|---|---|
| November 13 | at Butte High School | Athletic Park; Butte, MT | L 12–22 | |
| November 25 | at Montana | Missoula, MT (rivalry) | L 6–18 | |
| November 27 | at Helena High School | Helena, MT | W 8–0 | |
| December 4 | Butte High School | Butler Field; Bozeman, MT | L 6–16 | |

== 1898 ==
1898 Montana Agricultural football
- Conference: Independent
- Record: 0–2
- Head coach: George Ahern (1st season)
- Home stadium: Butler Field

1898 Far West college football independents records
| | Conf. | | | Overall |
| Team | W | L | T | W | | L | | T |
|---|---|---|---|---|---|---|---|---|
| San Jose Normal | | – | | 5 | – | 0 | – | 1 |
| California | | – | | 8 | – | 0 | – | 2 |
| Nevada State | | – | | 4 | – | 1 | – | 0 |
| USC | | – | | 5 | – | 1 | – | 1 |
| Gonzaga | | – | | 1 | – | 0 | – | 1 |
| Oregon | | – | | 3 | – | 1 | – | 0 |
| New Mexico A&M | | – | | 2 | – | 1 | – | 0 |
| Utah | | – | | 2 | – | 1 | – | 0 |
| Stanford | | – | | 5 | – | 3 | – | 1 |
| Montana | | – | | 3 | – | 2 | – | 0 |
| Saint Mary's | | – | | 3 | – | 2 | – | 0 |
| Denver | | – | | 6 | – | 4 | – | 1 |
| Washington | | – | | 1 | – | 1 | – | 0 |
| Oregon Agricultural | | – | | 1 | – | 2 | – | 1 |
| Washington Agricultural | | – | | 0 | – | 0 | – | 1 |
| Utah Agricultural | | – | | 0 | – | 1 | – | 0 |
| Montana Agricultural | | – | | 0 | – | 2 | – | 0 |
| Pacific (CA) | | – | | 0 | – | 0 | – | 2 |
| Wyoming | | – | | 0 | – | 4 | – | 0 |

The 1898 Montana Agricultural football team was an American football team that represented the Agricultural College of the State of Montana (later renamed Montana State University) during the 1898 college football season. In its first and only season under head coach George Ahern, the team compiled a 0–2 record and did not score a point, losing the second and third games of the Montana–Montana State football rivalry.

=== Schedule ===
| Date | Opponent | Site | Result | Source |
|---|---|---|---|---|
| November 13 | Montana | Butler Field; Bozeman, MT (rivalry) | L 0–6 | |
| November 24 | at Montana | Missoula, MT (rivalry) | L 0–18 | |

== 1899 ==
1899 Montana Agricultural football
- Conference: Independent
- Record: 3–0
- Head coach: William J. Adams (1st season)
- Home stadium: Butler Field

1899 Far West college football independents records
| | Conf. | | | Overall |
| Team | W | L | T | W | | L | | T |
|---|---|---|---|---|---|---|---|---|
| Montana Agricultural | | – | | 3 | – | 0 | – | 0 |
| Arizona Normal | | – | | 3 | – | 0 | – | 0 |
| New Mexico A&M | | – | | 1 | – | 0 | – | 0 |
| Utah Agricultural | | – | | 1 | – | 0 | – | 0 |
| California | | – | | 7 | – | 1 | – | 1 |
| Washington | | – | | 4 | – | 1 | – | 1 |
| Utah | | – | | 2 | – | 1 | – | 0 |
| San Jose Normal | | – | | 6 | – | 3 | – | 1 |
| Nevada State | | – | | 3 | – | 2 | – | 0 |
| Oregon Agricultural | | – | | 3 | – | 2 | – | 0 |
| Oregon | | – | | 3 | – | 2 | – | 1 |
| Arizona | | – | | 1 | – | 1 | – | 1 |
| Washington Agricultural | | – | | 1 | – | 1 | – | 0 |
| Montana | | – | | 1 | – | 2 | – | 0 |
| Idaho | | – | | 1 | – | 3 | – | 0 |
| USC | | – | | 2 | – | 3 | – | 1 |
| Stanford | | – | | 2 | – | 5 | – | 2 |
| Wyoming | | – | | 0 | – | 1 | – | 1 |
| Pacific (CA) | | – | | 0 | – | 4 | – | 0 |

The 1899 Montana Agricultural football team was an American football team that represented the Agricultural College of the State of Montana (later renamed Montana State University) during the 1899 college football season. In its first and only season under head coach William J. Adams, the team compiled a 3–0 record and did not allow opponents to score a point, scoring 54 points to 0 for the opposition. After three prior losses to the University of Montana, the 1899 team won the program's first victories in the Montana–Montana State football rivalry.

=== Schedule ===
| Date | Opponent | Site | Result | Source |
|---|---|---|---|---|
| November 17 | at Montana | Missoula, MT (rivalry) | W 5–0 | |
| November 18 | at Helena High School | Helena, MT | W 11–6 | |
| November 30 | Montana | Butler Field; Bozeman, MT (rivalry) | W 38–0 | |
