= 1899 Washington Agricultural football team =

American college football season

1899 Washington Agricultural football
- Conference: Independent
- Record: 1–1
- Head coach: Frank Shively (2nd season)
- Captain: Boyd Hamilton
- Home stadium: Soldier Field

1899 Far West college football independents records
	Conf.			Overall
Team	W	L	T	W		L		T
Montana Agricultural		–		3	–	0	–	0
Arizona Normal		–		3	–	0	–	0
New Mexico A&M		–		1	–	0	–	0
Utah Agricultural		–		1	–	0	–	0
California		–		7	–	1	–	1
Washington		–		4	–	1	–	1
Utah		–		2	–	1	–	0
San Jose Normal		–		6	–	3	–	1
Nevada State		–		3	–	2	–	0
Oregon Agricultural		–		3	–	2	–	0
Oregon		–		3	–	2	–	1
Arizona		–		1	–	1	–	1
Washington Agricultural		–		1	–	1	–	0
Montana		–		1	–	2	–	0
Idaho		–		1	–	3	–	0
USC		–		2	–	3	–	1
Stanford		–		2	–	5	–	2
Wyoming		–		0	–	1	–	1
Pacific (CA)		–		0	–	4	–	0

The 1899 Washington Agricultural football team was an American football team that represented Washington Agricultural College during the 1899 college football season. The team competed as an independent under head coach Frank Shively and compiled a record of 1–1.

== Schedule ==
Date	Opponent	Site	Result	Attendance	Source
October 28	Idaho	Pullman, WA	W 11–0	500	
November 10	at Whitman	Walla Walla, WA	L 10–11		
