= 1893 San Jose Normal football team =

American college football season

1893 San Jose Normal football
- Conference: Independent
- Record: 0–1
- Head coach: James E. Addicott (1st season)

1893 Far West college football independents records
	Conf.			Overall
Team	W	L	T	W		L		T
Stanford		–		8	–	0	–	1
Pacific University		–		2	–	0	–	0
Gonzaga		–		1	–	0	–	0
Saint Mary's		–		1	–	0	–	0
Wyoming		–		1	–	0	–	0
Oregon Agricultural		–		5	–	1	–	0
California		–		5	–	1	–	1
USC		–		3	–	1	–	0
Washington		–		1	–	3	–	1
Idaho		–		0	–	0	–	1
San Jose Normal		–		0	–	1	–	0
Albany College		–		0	–	1	–	0
Oregon State Normal		–		0	–	4	–	0

The 1893 San Jose Normal football team represented California State Normal School—now known as San Jose State University—as an independent during the 1893 college football season. In the program's second year of play, San Jose Normal lost its contest against San Jose YMCA.

== Schedule ==
Date	Opponent	Site	Result
December 9	vs. San Jose YMCA	Recreation Park; San Jose, CA	L 0–18
