= 1893 USC Methodists football team =

American college football season

1893 USC Methodists football
- Conference: Independent
- Record: 3–1
- Head coach: None
- Captain: None

1893 Far West college football independents records
	Conf.			Overall
Team	W	L	T	W		L		T
Stanford		–		8	–	0	–	1
Pacific University		–		2	–	0	–	0
Gonzaga		–		1	–	0	–	0
Saint Mary's		–		1	–	0	–	0
Wyoming		–		1	–	0	–	0
Oregon Agricultural		–		5	–	1	–	0
California		–		5	–	1	–	1
USC		–		3	–	1	–	0
Washington		–		1	–	3	–	1
Idaho		–		0	–	0	–	1
San Jose Normal		–		0	–	1	–	0
Albany College		–		0	–	1	–	0
Oregon State Normal		–		0	–	4	–	0

The 1893 USC Methodists football team was an American football team that represented the University of Southern California during the 1893 college football season. The team competed as an independent without a head coach, compiling a 3–1 record.

== Schedule ==
Date	Opponent	Site	Result	Attendance	Source
January 14	Chaw-sir Club	University Athletic Grounds; Los Angeles, CA	W 14–2	200	
November 18	at Throop	Athletic Park; Pasadena, CA	W 22–12		
December 11	at Chaffey College	Ontario, CA	L 6–32		
December 22	Throop	University Athletic Grounds; Los Angeles, CA	W 14–4	100	
