= 1893 California Golden Bears football team =

American college football season

1893 California Golden Bears football
- Conference: Independent
- Record: 5–1–1
- Head coach: Pudge Heffelfinger (1st season)
- Captain: Percy Benson

1893 Far West college football independents records
	Conf.			Overall
Team	W	L	T	W		L		T
Stanford		–		8	–	0	–	1
Pacific University		–		2	–	0	–	0
Gonzaga		–		1	–	0	–	0
Saint Mary's		–		1	–	0	–	0
Wyoming		–		1	–	0	–	0
Oregon Agricultural		–		5	–	1	–	0
California		–		5	–	1	–	1
USC		–		3	–	1	–	0
Washington		–		1	–	3	–	1
Idaho		–		0	–	0	–	1
San Jose Normal		–		0	–	1	–	0
Albany College		–		0	–	1	–	0
Oregon State Normal		–		0	–	4	–	0

The 1893 California Golden Bears football team was an American football team that represented the University of California, Berkeley during the 1893 college football season. The team competed as an independent under head coach Pudge Heffelfinger and compiled a record of 5–1–1.

== Schedule ==
Date	Time	Opponent	Site	Result	Attendance
October 28		Reliance Athletic Club	Berkeley, CA	W 30–0	
November 1		vs. San Francisco All-Star	Haight Street Grounds; San Francisco, CA	W 14–12	
November 3		vs. Olympic Club	Haight Street Grounds; San Francisco, CA	W 22–10	
November 11		vs. Olympic Club	Haight Street Grounds; San Francisco, CA	W 12–6	
November 14		vs. Reliance Athletic Club	Piedmont, CA	W 22–10	
November 17		vs. Reliance Athletic Club	Peidmont, CA	L 4–16	
November 30	2:30 p.m.	vs. Stanford	Haight Street Grounds; San Francisco, CA (Big Game)	T 6–6	18,000
All times are in Pacific time
