= Hiland Orlando Stickney =

American football player and coach (1867–1911)

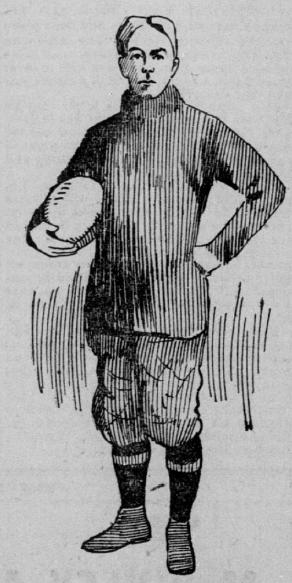

Biographical details
- Born: February 19, 1867; Plymouth, Vermont, U.S.
- Died: October 5, 1911 (aged 44); Portland, Oregon, U.S.

Playing career
- 1889–1890: Harvard
- 1893: Chicago Athletic Association
- 1896: Olympic Club
- 1897: Multnomah Athletic Club
- Positions: Fullback, halfback, tackle

Coaching career (HC unless noted)
- 1893: Grinnell
- 1894–1895: Wisconsin
- 1896: Olympic Club
- 1897: Multnomah Athletic Club
- 1899: Oregon Agricultural

Head coaching record
- Overall: 16–7–1 (college)

Hiland Orlando "Harry" Stickney (February 19, 1867 – October 5, 1911) was an American college football player and coach. He served as the head football coach at Grinnell College in 1893, the University of Wisconsin from 1894 to 1895, and the Oregon Agricultural College (OAC)—now known as Oregon State University in 1899. He led the 1899 Oregon Agricultural Aggies football team to a record of 3–2.

Stickney was born on February 19, 1967 to John W. and Ann P. Stickney. A native of Plymouth, Vermont, his siblings included William W. Stickney, who served as governor of Vermont from 1900 to 1902. Stickney played football at Harvard University as a tackle. In 1898, he coached and played halfback for the Olympic Club football team in San Francisco. He went to Portland, Oregon in 1897, where he coached and played fullback for the Multnomah Athletic Club football team.

Stickney's later worked in real estate. He financed the construction of Portland's Railway Exchange Building. Stickney died on October 5, 1911, at St. Vincent's Hospital in Portland.

== Head coaching record ==
=== College ===
Year	Team	Overall	Conference	Standing	Bowl/playoffs
Grinnell Pioneers (Independent) (1893)
1893	Grinnell	3–1			
Grinnell:		3–1			
Wisconsin Badgers (Independent) (1894–1895)
1894	Wisconsin	5–2			
1895	Wisconsin	5–2–1			
Wisconsin:		10–4–1			
Oregon Agricultural Aggies (Independent) (1899)
1899	Oregon Agricultural	3–2			
Oregon Agricultural:		3–2			
Total:		16–7–1			
