= 1893 Stanford football team =

American college football season

1893 Stanford football
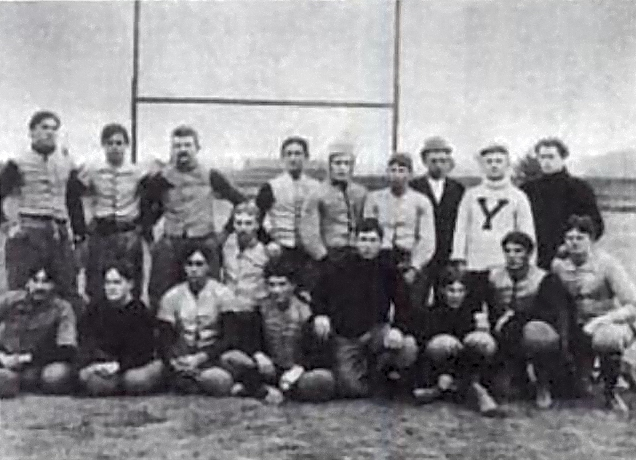
- Conference: Independent
- Record: 8–0–1
- Head coach: C. D. Bliss (1st season)

1893 Far West college football independents records
| | Conf. | | | Overall |
| Team | W | L | T | W | | L | | T |
|---|---|---|---|---|---|---|---|---|
| Stanford | | – | | 8 | – | 0 | – | 1 |
| Pacific University | | – | | 2 | – | 0 | – | 0 |
| Gonzaga | | – | | 1 | – | 0 | – | 0 |
| Saint Mary's | | – | | 1 | – | 0 | – | 0 |
| Wyoming | | – | | 1 | – | 0 | – | 0 |
| Oregon Agricultural | | – | | 5 | – | 1 | – | 0 |
| California | | – | | 5 | – | 1 | – | 1 |
| USC | | – | | 3 | – | 1 | – | 0 |
| Washington | | – | | 1 | – | 3 | – | 1 |
| Idaho | | – | | 0 | – | 0 | – | 1 |
| San Jose Normal | | – | | 0 | – | 1 | – | 0 |
| Albany College | | – | | 0 | – | 1 | – | 0 |
| Oregon State Normal | | – | | 0 | – | 4 | – | 0 |

The 1893 Stanford football team represented Stanford University in the 1893 college football season. Led by C. D. Bliss, Stanford was undefeated, with one tie against rival California.

== Season summary ==
The previous season, Stanford was coached by Walter Camp, who had agreed to coach the team on the condition that he complete coaching Yale's football season first. For the 1893 season, Camp returned to the East Coast and Stanford hired C. D. "Pop" Bliss, who had played halfback for Camp's team at Yale and had just graduated. Led by Bliss, Stanford dominated its opponents, outscoring them 284–17 with seven shutouts and only one blemish: a tie with rival California.

This was Bliss's only season at Stanford; Camp returned to Stanford the next season and Bliss moved on to coach Haverford College.

== Schedule ==
| Date | Time | Opponent | Site | Result | Attendance | Source |
|---|---|---|---|---|---|---|
| November 4 | | vs. Olympic Club | Haight Street Grounds; San Francisco, CA | W 46–0 | | |
| November 11 | | at Reliance Athletic Club | San Jose, CA | W 34–0 | | |
| November 18 | | at Olympic Club | Haight Street Grounds; San Francisco, CA | W 24–11 | | |
| November 30 | | vs. California | Haight Street Grounds; San Francisco, CA (rivalry) | T 6–6 | | |
| December 16 | | vs. Reliance Athletic Club | Haight Street Grounds; San Francisco, CA | W 18–0 | | |
| December 25 | | at Tacoma Athletic Club | Tacoma, WA | W 48–0 | | |
| December 27 | | at Port Townsend Athletic Club | Port Townsend, WA | W 50–0 | | |
| December 29 | 2:00 p.m. | at Washington | West Seattle; Seattle, WA | W 40–0 | 600 | |
| January 1, 1894 | | at Multnomah Athletic Club | Multnomah Field; Portland, OR | W 18–0 | | |
