= 1899 California Golden Bears football team =

American college football season

1899 California Golden Bears football
- Conference: Independent
- Record: 7–1–1
- Head coach: Garrett Cochran (2nd season)
- Captain: James Whipple

1899 Far West college football independents records
	Conf.			Overall
Team	W	L	T	W		L		T
Montana Agricultural		–		3	–	0	–	0
Arizona Normal		–		3	–	0	–	0
New Mexico A&M		–		1	–	0	–	0
Utah Agricultural		–		1	–	0	–	0
California		–		7	–	1	–	1
Washington		–		4	–	1	–	1
Utah		–		2	–	1	–	0
San Jose Normal		–		6	–	3	–	1
Nevada State		–		3	–	2	–	0
Oregon Agricultural		–		3	–	2	–	0
Oregon		–		3	–	2	–	1
Arizona		–		1	–	1	–	1
Washington Agricultural		–		1	–	1	–	0
Montana		–		1	–	2	–	0
Idaho		–		1	–	3	–	0
USC		–		2	–	3	–	1
Stanford		–		2	–	5	–	2
Wyoming		–		0	–	1	–	1
Pacific (CA)		–		0	–	4	–	0

The 1899 California Golden Bears football team was an American football team that represented the University of California, Berkeley during the 1899 college football season. The team competed as an independent under head coach Garrett Cochran and compiled a record of 7–1–1.

For just the second time in history, an eastern team traveled to the Pacific coast. Carlisle defeated California by a score of 2–0. The news reported the contest as the first matchup of East and West, but was pre-dated by the 1894 Chicago vs. Stanford football game. Like the Chicago vs. Stanford game before it, the Carlisle vs. California game foreshadows the first bowl game, the 1902 Rose Bowl.

== Schedule ==
Date	Time	Opponent	Site	Result	Attendance	Source
September 30		Olympic Club	Berkeley, CA	W 6–0		
October 14		vs. Olympic Club	Richmond Field; San Francisco, CA	T 0–0		
October 21		League of the Cross	Berkeley, CA	W 11–0		
November 11		vs. Olympic Club	Richmond Field; San Francisco, CA	W 15–0		
November 15		Nevada State	Berkeley, CA	W 24–0		
November 18	3:20 p.m.	Oregon	Berkeley, CA	W 12–0	2,000	
November 22		San Jose Normal	Berkeley, CA	W 44–0		
November 30		vs. Stanford	Richmond Field; San Francisco, CA (Big Game)	W 30–0	14,600	
December 25		vs. Carlisle	Richmond Field; San Francisco, CA	L 0–2		
All times are in Pacific time

== Game summaries ==
=== Additional note ===
Berkeley was the site of a football-related death in 1899 when Cal senior Jesse Norris Hicks died November 4 from injuries sustained in an inter-class football game.
