= Charles M. Barber =

American football coach

Biographical details
- Born: December 27, 1876; LaPorte, Indiana, U.S.
- Died: June 23, 1954 (aged 77); Flint, Michigan, U.S.

Coaching career (HC unless noted)
- 1897–1898: New Mexico A&M

Head coaching record
- Overall: 3–1–1

Charles Melvin Barber (December 27, 1876 – June 23, 1954) was an American college football coach, author, botanist and zoologist. He attended the New Mexico College of Agriculture and Mechanic Arts–now known as New Mexico State University–beginning in 1897. He served as the school's head football coach during the 1897 and 1898 seasons, compiling a record of 3–1–1.

Barber traveled extensively across the southwest United States, Mexico, and Central America, collecting animal specimens for American museums. He worked at the Field Museum of Natural History, in Chicago, from 1903 to 1908.

== Head coaching record ==
Year	Team	Overall	Conference	Standing	Bowl/playoffs
New Mexico A&M Aggies (Independent) (1897–1898)
1897	New Mexico A&M	1–0–1			
1898	New Mexico A&M	2–1			
New Mexico A&M:		3–1–1			
Total:		3–1–1			
