= 1893–94 Wyoming Cowboys football team =

American college football season

1893–94 Wyoming Cowboys football
- Conference: Independent
- Record: 1–0
- Head coach: Fred Hess (1st season)
- Captain: None

1893 Far West college football independents records
	Conf.			Overall
Team	W	L	T	W		L		T
Stanford		–		8	–	0	–	1
Pacific University		–		2	–	0	–	0
Gonzaga		–		1	–	0	–	0
Saint Mary's		–		1	–	0	–	0
Wyoming		–		1	–	0	–	0
Oregon Agricultural		–		5	–	1	–	0
California		–		5	–	1	–	1
USC		–		3	–	1	–	0
Washington		–		1	–	3	–	1
Idaho		–		0	–	0	–	1
San Jose Normal		–		0	–	1	–	0
Albany College		–		0	–	1	–	0
Oregon State Normal		–		0	–	4	–	0

The 1893 Wyoming Cowboys football team represented the University of Wyoming as an independent during the 1893 college football season. In its first season of college football, the team played only one game, defeating Cheyenne High School by a 14–0 score. Fred Hess was the team's coach. There was no team captain. However, guard Thony Cialella was considered a team leader.

== Schedule ==
Date	Opponent	Site	Result	Source
February 22, 1894	Cheyenne High School	Laramie, WY	W 14–0	
