= 1899 Stanford football team =

American college football season

1899 Stanford football
- Conference: Independent
- Record: 2–5–2
- Head coach: Burr Chamberlain (1st season)

1899 Far West college football independents records
	Conf.			Overall
Team	W	L	T	W		L		T
Montana Agricultural		–		3	–	0	–	0
Arizona Normal		–		3	–	0	–	0
New Mexico A&M		–		1	–	0	–	0
Utah Agricultural		–		1	–	0	–	0
California		–		7	–	1	–	1
Washington		–		4	–	1	–	1
Utah		–		2	–	1	–	0
San Jose Normal		–		6	–	3	–	1
Nevada State		–		3	–	2	–	0
Oregon Agricultural		–		3	–	2	–	0
Oregon		–		3	–	2	–	1
Arizona		–		1	–	1	–	1
Washington Agricultural		–		1	–	1	–	0
Montana		–		1	–	2	–	0
Idaho		–		1	–	3	–	0
USC		–		2	–	3	–	1
Stanford		–		2	–	5	–	2
Wyoming		–		0	–	1	–	1
Pacific (CA)		–		0	–	4	–	0

The 1899 Stanford football team represented Stanford University in the 1899 college football season. With a 2–5–2 record in head coach Burr Chamberlain's only season at the school, the Stanford football team lost as many games in 1899 as they had in the previous four seasons combined and produced the first losing season in school history. The team played its home games at Stanford, California.

== Schedule ==
Date	Opponent	Site	Result	Source
October 7	at Olympic Club	16th and Folsom Street Grounds; San Francisco, CA	T 0–0	
October 21	at Olympic Club	16th and Folsom Street Grounds; San Francisco, CA	T 0–0	
November 4	at Olympic Club	16th and Folsom Street Grounds; San Francisco, CA	L 5–6	
November 7	Olympic Club	Stanford, CA	L 5–16	
November 11	Nevada State	Stanford, CA	W 17–5	
November 18	at Olympic Club	16th and Folsom Street Grounds; San Francisco, CA	L 0–10	
November 30	vs. California	16th and Folsom Street Grounds; San Francisco, CA (rivalry)	L 0–30	
January 1, 1900	at Multnomah Athletic Club	Multnomah Field; Portland, OR	L 6–11	
January 3, 1900	at All-Seattle	YMCA Athletic Park; Seattle, WA	W 28–0	
