= A. S. Jeffs =

American football player and coach (1871–1905)

Biographical details
- Born: July 8, 1871; Pialschie, King County, Washington, U.S.
- Died: April 27, 1905 (aged 33)
- Education: Stanford University

Playing career
- 1895–1897: Stanford

Coaching career (HC unless noted)
- 1899: Washington

Head coaching record
- Overall: 4–1–1

Alexander Samuel Jeffs (July 8, 1871 – April 27, 1905) was an American college football player and coach. He served as head football coach at the University of Washington in 1899, compiling a record of 4–1–1. Born in King County, Washington, Jeffs graduated from the Portland Academy in 1894 and later attended and graduated from law from Stanford University in 1899.

== Head coaching record ==
Year	Team	Overall	Conference	Standing	Bowl/playoffs
Washington (Independent) ({{{startyear}}})
1899	Washington	4–1–1			
Washington:		4–1–1			
Total:		4–1–1			
