= 1893 Washington football team =

American college football season

1893 Washington football
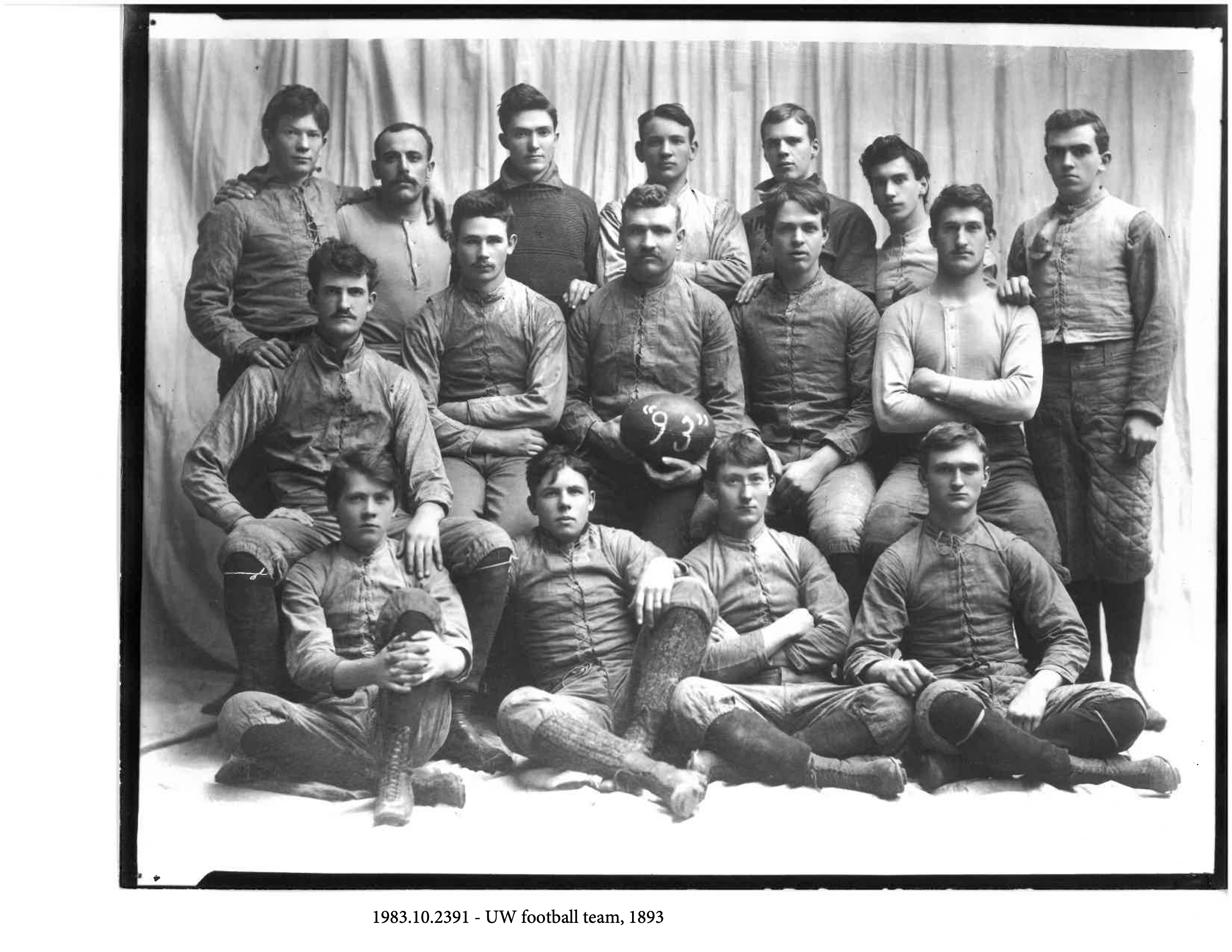
- Conference: Independent
- Record: 1–3–1
- Head coach: W. B. Goodwin (2nd season)
- Captain: Delbert A. Ford

1893 Far West college football independents records
	Conf.			Overall
Team	W	L	T	W		L		T
Stanford		–		8	–	0	–	1
Pacific University		–		2	–	0	–	0
Gonzaga		–		1	–	0	–	0
Saint Mary's		–		1	–	0	–	0
Wyoming		–		1	–	0	–	0
Oregon Agricultural		–		5	–	1	–	0
California		–		5	–	1	–	1
USC		–		3	–	1	–	0
Washington		–		1	–	3	–	1
Idaho		–		0	–	0	–	1
San Jose Normal		–		0	–	1	–	0
Albany College		–		0	–	1	–	0
Oregon State Normal		–		0	–	4	–	0

The 1893 Washington football team was an American football team that represented the University of Washington as an independent during the 1893 college football season In its second season under W. B. Goodwin, the Washington team compiled a 1–3–1 record and was outscored by its opponents by a combined total of 86 to 18. D. A. Ford was the team captain.

== Schedule ==
Date	Time	Opponent	Site	Result	Attendance	Source
November 11	3:00 p.m.	at Vivienda	Tacoma, WA	W 8–4	300	
November 18	3:00 p.m.	Tacoma Athletic Club	West Seattle; Seattle, WA	L 4–6	300	
November 25		at Port Townsend Athletic Club	Port Townsend, WA	T 6–6	150	
November 30	2:00 p.m.	at Multnomah Athletic Club	Multnomah Field; Portland, OR	L 0–30	150	
December 29	2:00 p.m.	Stanford	West Seattle; Seattle, WA	L 0–40	600	
