= History of Oregon Agricultural Aggies baseball in the 1890s =

Cartoon by Percival Nash for The Hayseed, 1894, first collegiate yearbook published in the Pacific Northwest.

Intercollegiate baseball was played at Oregon Agricultural College (OAC, today's Oregon State University) from the spring of 1893. This brief history of Oregon Agricultural Aggies baseball in the 1890s charts the development of the sport at the school during its pioneering decade, from the first intercollegiate game played on Saturday, April 29, 1893, as well as the debut rivalry game with Oregon in 1894 to the decade's conclusion with the indoor baseball season of 1900.

== Background ==
Although tracing its roots back to Corvallis College, a small educational institution operated by the Methodist Episcopal Church, South in the 1870s, Oregon Agricultural College (OAC) in Corvallis, Oregon was only converted into a state-owned land-grant university at its current location effective with the 1888–89 academic year. That year, the school was composed of just 99 students — men and women combined — more than a third of whom were part of the college preparatory program owing to the lack of sufficient public secondary schools in the state.

Baseball was widely played throughout Oregon, typically by city teams unaffiliated with any educational institution. In the winter of 1892, a proposal was floated for the launch of an amateur baseball league including clubs from the college towns of Albany, Corvallis, McMinnville, Salem, and Eugene, but nothing came of the proposal.

Intercollegiate baseball was also beginning to stir around Oregon late in the winter of 1892, with the Oregon State Normal School at Monmouth forming a baseball team in February and issuing a public challenge to other colleges and universities around the state. OAC was not one of the schools with an organized team able to meet this challenge during the spring of the 1891–92 academic year, however.

== 1893 season ==
Owing to its primitive facilities, limited funding, and the small size of its student body, the emergence of organized intercollegiate athletics at OAC was not instantaneous. It was only during the academic year of 1892–93 that organized team sports emerged. Critical to this change was the self-organization of athletic-minded male students on campus as the Oregon Agricultural College Athletic Association (OACAA) — a formal group established in the fall of 1892 which collected monthly dues, elected officers, and served as a central coordinating organization for sports on campus.

Birdseye view of the primitive baseball diamond on the athletic grounds of Oregon Agricultural College's lower campus, facing East towards downtown Corvallis, c. 1893.

Cursed by rainy spring weather, a planned intercollegiate baseball game with neighboring Albany College (today's Lewis & Clark College) was postponed more than once. However, on April 25 the school's baseball players "turned out in force ... and cleaned up the diamond and resurrected things generally" in anticipation of an April 29 game, weather permitting.

An Albany College team of nine players and one substitute made the 10-mile trip to Corvallis. This time the weather cooperated and contest — a match in which "some pretty plays were made, but about as many errors as plays," in the words of one observer. Although the score of OAC's ugly first intercollegiate baseball was not reported in the press, it is known that the home team won.

Fans being fans, an angry pseudonymous letter from an Albany fan was published in the Sunday Albany Herald, in which it was charged that the umpire had been biased towards OAC and made a series of unfair decisions — an analysis challenged in a lengthy response by a pseudonymous writer calling himself "A Ball-Player" in the Corvallis Gazette. Taking issue with the Albany writer's description of the OAC field as being in "good condition," the unnamed Corvallis "Ball-Player" added a colorful description of the state of the local field:

"The outfield seemed to have been a dried up swamp with all the sediment left. There were several rock piles scattered about the field, and where there were no rock piles the ground was interspersed with dead furrows. The diamond was tolerable, but the track between the bases had been laid down in gravel, so that it was rather dangerous for a base-runner to slide when close to a base."

A return game to be played in Albany was scheduled for Saturday, May 13. In a remarkably high-scoring first inning, the Agrics took a 9–6 lead over the home club in the rematch. OAC made the lead 11–6 after two innings and then held on to win by a score of 18–16 in a game featuring a running one-handed stop of a hot grounder and a catch of a foul ball after fighting through the crowd by the visitors and a line drive home run in the bottom of the 9th inning by Orva Turner of Albany.

A third game of the two clubs was tentatively planned for two weeks hence, Saturday, May 27, in the small Linn County town of Lyons. This time the Aggies suffered a "disastrous defeat" at the hands of Albany, falling to 2 wins and 1 loss on the year. The Corvallis Gazette minced no words, declaring "the result of the game probably would have been different if Palmer's pitching hadn't been so wild."

With the school year drawing to a close, a fourth game in Corvallis was rumored. A game with a club called Young Willamettes, to be held in the coastal town of Newport, was definitely scheduled for Saturday, June 17. No evidence of either game having taken place seems to have survived.

Intramural baseball was also played on the OAC grounds during the 1892–93 school year, with the Juniors battling a picked nine of underclassmen and town kids on June 20, 1893, losing to the youngsters 7–6 in late innings when their pitcher ran out of gas. The game was otherwise noteworthy for the injury of town player Billy Kerr, who was struck by a pitch in the side of the head and lost for the afternoon.

== 1894 season ==
Lineup of the 1894 OAC Aggies baseball team, the second year in which the school played intercollegiate baseball.

By the 1893–94 academic year, OAC's student body had more than doubled in size from its 1888-89 origins, counting 148 men among its 240 students. The governing OAC Board of Regents had taken notice of a demand for college athletes and designated one large room of the school's new Mechanical building for use as a gymnasium ahead of the 1893–94 school year. This decision was received with "much enthusiasm," with the school's women — nearly 40% of the student body — adding a seemingly-successful appeal for use of the new athletic facility two days a week.

But in the fall of 1893 it was football that exploded in popularity as OAC's collegiate sport of choice. "Foot-ball was an unknown game in this country [Corvallis] at the opening of the season; owing to the career of the College team, every person of Corvallis and vicinity understands all the intricacies of the game and fully appreciates the numerous fine points that are shown on the gridiron field," one OAC sports fan observed.

After a late start due to the inevitable spring rains for which the Willamette Valley is known, a total of three games were played in 1894 — two against Albany College, which were split, and one against the University of Oregon, won by the Aggies. Manager of the 1894 hardball team was Will H. Bloss, son of the college president.

As historian Brian Campf points out, the first time that OAC did battle with their rivals from Eugene City, the University of Oregon, on an athletic field, it was on a diamond on May 12, 1894, rather than on the gridiron in November of that year. The game was won by the University squad, by an incredible score of 32–23. Pitching appears to have been in short supply.

== 1895 season ==
The Oregon Agricultural College yearbook, The Hayseed, was not brought back for the 1894-95 academic year for financial reasons, nor was there yet a monthly campus literary magazine published, making it impossible to definitively answer the question of whether intercollegiate baseball was played by the school during that year.

Local newspapers did regularly cover campus activities on a weekly basis, however. There is no evidence of an 1895 OAC varsity baseball team having been formed or of any games having been played in the complete surviving runs of issues of the weekly Corvallis Gazette or the semi-weekly Corvallis Times.

The OAC had 261 total students, 170 of whom were male, during the 1894-95 academic year. Successfully fielding a team would have required the active participation of nearly 6% of the school's male students.

== 1896 season ==
Track and field was the dominant spring sport at OAC during the 1895–96 academic year, to the chagrin of the athletic editor of the Campus Barometer, the new monthly magazine of the school.

After having largely disappeared from the college scene, "base-ball is taking a new start throughout the West this season," he noted. Observing that while the University of Portland was starting a team for the spring of 1896, "little has been done at the OAC in the base-ball line, and why it is, we are unable to answer." Consistently poor spring weather in the Willamette Valley was identified as the most likely culprit, as persistent rain had recently forced postponement of a scheduled game between Albany and Portland.

While an informal team had come together to play a game in the school's name against the "old college" on February 22, there is no documentary indication that intercollegiate games were played by OAC in 1896.

An exhibition game was also scheduled for commencement week pitting seniors and professors of OAC against their peers from the University of California. The fact that an ad hoc team was to be organized for this match adds circumstantial evidence that there was no formal varsity team to call upon during this year.

== 1897 season ==
Baseball was back in 1897. At the end of February planning began to form a first "intercollegiate baseball league" for the state of Oregon. Under the scheme, two first-round games were to be held May 1, pitting Albany College and OAC in one contest, with Pacific College (today's George Fox University) and Baptist College of McMinnville (today's Linfield University) doing battle in the second. The winners of these games would move on to face the University of Oregon and Oregon State Normal School (today's Western Oregon University), respectively, in a May 15 second round. The two winners of these games would then move on to a championship game, to be played May 29 at a location to be determined later.

Initial reports indicated that "the OAC boys say they have not joined the league and the game for Corvallis is off," as owing to the need for "training for field day athletic events" there would be "no time for baseball."

This initial rejection seems to have been revisited. A meeting was held in March 1897 concerning selection of a baseball team to represent the OAC. A committee of three was named to choose a starting nine from "the large number of base ball enthusiasts." The sports reporter for the OAC monthly magazine viewed this decision positively, opining that the school had "the material for as good a team as can be found anywhere." The Corvallis Gazette announced that an OAC team had been formed on March 19 and passed along the news that a town team was also reforming so that residents could soon "expect a local revival of the national game.

Intramural competition on the diamond also continued to be a regular activity, with a nine from the large freshman class taking on a team combining sophomores, juniors, and seniors on Saturday, April 17, with the young squad coming from behind for a 21–19 win. The following week it was the seniors against the faculty in a five inning affair, with the younger squad again coming from behind for the victory.

The intercollegiate season consisted of a May 1 game against Albany College, played across the river in Albany. The Orangemen got off to a catastrophic start, giving up 11 unearned runs in the first inning, but managed to correct their errant throwing and fight back to make a game of it. OAC actually took the lead in the fourth inning and held it all the way to the final frame, only to lose 19–18 when Albany scored two final runs off Aggie errors for a walk-off victory in front of a rapturous crowd. Charges and counter-charges of both Albany and Corvallis having used non-enrolled players ensued in the aftermath.

It appears that the Albany loss in the first round of the single-elimination tournament "league" effectively ended the OAC season. No evidence of any additional games played has survived.

== 1898 season ==
The 1898 OAC baseball team. The entire squad appears to have been equipped with catcher's mitts.

Again, it was track and field that captured the attention of OAC's best athletes in the spring, with Eph Cameron, touted as "the best trainer on the coast," hired to coach the "farmer-athletes" for the spring meets of 1898. "If good instruction and management will do it, the OAC will have another star team," the Corvallis Gazette declared.

A baseball team was organized in earnest at OAC for the 1898 season, however. The squad made their debut at home on Saturday, March 12, against a city team from neighboring Philomath. No score of this game seems to have been published.

Another game was held Saturday, April 16, in Corvallis, when the OAC team met the Oregon State Normal School team. The game got off to a ragged start, but the Orangemen calmed down after four sloppy innings and emerged with a 20–10 win.

Another intercollegiate baseball tournament was organized for 1898. Scheduled to begin May 21, the first week was to pit OAC against their arch-rivals from the University of Oregon in game 1, with McMinnville and Pacific doing battle in game 2. The winner of the OAC–Oregon game was to meet Albany College and the winner of the McMinnville–Pacific tilt was to take on Oregon State Normal School, both on May 28. The winners of these two games were to face off at Salem on June 4 to decide the state championship.

The eruption of the Spanish–American War on April 21, 1898, was a disorienting factor. Since its inception, all male students at OAC were required to participate in military drill and patriotic sentiment ran high. President William McKinley's April 23 call for 200,000 volunteers was immediately met by 20 OAC men suspending their studies to enlist immediately. This represented 6% of the entire student body of 336 students, about a third of whom were women.

This forthcoming war-related loss of students did not immediately kill the OAC baseball team, however. On Saturday, May 7 the squad traveled 25 miles to Monmouth to take on Oregon State Normal School in a return game. The travesty of the earlier error-plagued meeting was avoided in the rematch, with the Aggies winning 8 to 5 in what one local reporter described as "a good exhibition of genuine baseball" that was "interesting throughout."

Uncertainty about the season remained. In the aftermath of their second victory over the Normals, rumors began to swirl that the state university might forfeit its scheduled May 21 tournament opener against OAC, as "her team is not showing up well." In the event of an Oregon forfeit, the second-round match with Albany College was to be moved up one week to fill the date.

The Corvallis military volunteers shipped out for the Philippines on Tuesday, May 24. No account of a May 21 OAC baseball game appears in the surviving newspapers of Corvallis, Eugene, or Albany.

== 1899 season ==
A.G. Spalding ad for indoor baseball equipment. The game was played with a 33 inch bat no more than 1-3/8 inches in diameter and a ball with a circumference of 17 inches. No gloves were used.

The emergence of a tangential new sport — indoor baseball — temporarily solved the perennial problem of rain-outs cased by Western Oregon's inevitably wet springs. Invented in Chicago in 1887 and played for the first time in the Pacific Northwest in the fall of 1891, the game made its way to Corvallis during the 1898–99 academic year.

Indoor baseball was played inside gymnasiums using a ball 17 inches in circumference — significantly larger than the 12-inch slow pitch softballs of today — as well as stick-like hickory bats carefully limited in size. Baselines were just 27 feet long. The ball was thrown straight overhand with no flexing of the elbow, as in cricket, with the pitcher taking no more than one step in making the delivery. Curving of the ball was deemed illegal.

Only one indoor baseball game was played in that season, a match with neighboring Albany College won by the Agrics by a score of 14 to 6. There were no conventional baseball games played intercollegiately by OAC during the 1899 or 1900 seasons.

== 1900 season ==
Organized indoor baseball showed signs of growth during the 1899-1900 academic year in Oregon, and the OAC team managed to quadruple the number of contests on their schedule in 1900. The Albany College "Atlas Club" was dispatched by a score of 17 to 7. This was followed by a victory over the Salem YMCA second team, with the Aggies winning a slugfest, 26 to 16.

The stage was set for the first indoor baseball battle with the rival University of Oregon. OAC pulled out the victory, 17 to 12, advancing their record to 3–0 on the year.

The final game, played against the Salem YMCA first team, provided a less gratifying outcome, with the capital city team emerging with a 20–18 win. "However as the Salem team previously had been beaten by Albany and Albany in turn by OAC, the defeat was counterbalance," one orange-and-black partisan noted. A championship game with Albany was arranged, but "unfortunately for us, other college matters intervened and it was not played," the Aggie fan further observed.

The minor detail that no decisive championship contest was held did not deter the Aggies from posing with a large banner reading "CHAMPIONS" in their team picture.

The OAC indoor baseball team of 1900.

== Record ==
Year	Manager	Captain	Wins	Losses	Pct.	Unknown Result
1893	—	—	2	1	.667	1
1894	Will H. Bloss	William Ray	2	1	.667	
1895	— No Team —					
1896	— No Team —					
1897	—	Ralph W. Terrill	0	1	.000	
1898	—	—	2	0	1.000	2
1899 †	—	—	1	0	1.000	
1900 †	J.G. Elgin	Raymond Henkle	3	1	.750	
† - Indoor baseball

== Legacy ==
Baseball in the 1890s at Oregon Agricultural College was never part of the school's institutional memory the way that football and men's basketball have been. Already in 1901, the editor of a student handbook for the coming year produced by the YMCA and YWCA could truthfully write: "In baseball we have met with varying success. No league was ever formed and hence no records preserved."

The OAC indoor baseball team was disbanded in the spring of 1902 "on account of the inability to obtain games with different college teams." At the same time, an organizational meeting attended by 40 men was held to form a new traditional baseball team. The school's physical director, Jacob Patterson, was named manager of the team and plans were made for a new baseball diamond on campus.

Oregon State University continues to make use of an objectively incorrect origins story for its baseball program, asserting in its 2024 baseball media guide that "when Oregon State began fielding a varsity baseball team in 1907, the school laid out a diamond on a lot just south of the main campus. A century later, that same site still serves as the home of the Beavers..." The school's first intercollegiate varsity game was actually played April 29, 1893, on a different field.
