= Victory Bell (Pacific–San Jose State) =

American college football rivalry

- Pacific Tigers San Jose State Spartans
- Sport: American football
- Type: Collegiate
- First meeting: 1895; Tie, 0–0
- Latest meeting: October 28, 1995; Pacific, 32–30
- Stadiums: Spartan Stadium and Stagg Memorial Stadium
- Trophy: Victory Bell

Statistics
- Total meetings: 68
- All-time series: San Jose State leads, 43–23–6
- Trophy series: San Jose State leads, 29–17–2
- Largest victory: Pacific, 46–0 (1923)
- Longest win streak: San Jose State, 9 wins (1984–1992)

Locations of University of the Pacific and San José State University

The Victory Bell is the trophy that was awarded to the winner of the now defunct Pacific–San José State football rivalry game. It was a college football rivalry between the Pacific Tigers football team of the University of the Pacific and the San José State Spartans football team of San José State University.

University of the Pacific was founded in 1851 in Santa Clara, California but soon moved to San Jose, California, and claims to be the first institution of higher education in California. San José State University was founded in San Jose, California in 1857 and is California's first public institution of higher education. Due to the "private vs. public" institutional competitiveness and the close geographical proximity of the two schools, a natural "cross-town" rivalry was born.

The series ended in 1995, when Pacific dissolved its football team citing cost issues. At the conclusion of the rivalry, San Jose State led the series, 43–23–6 for a total of 72 matches. The Victory Bell was introduced in 1949.

== Historical overview ==
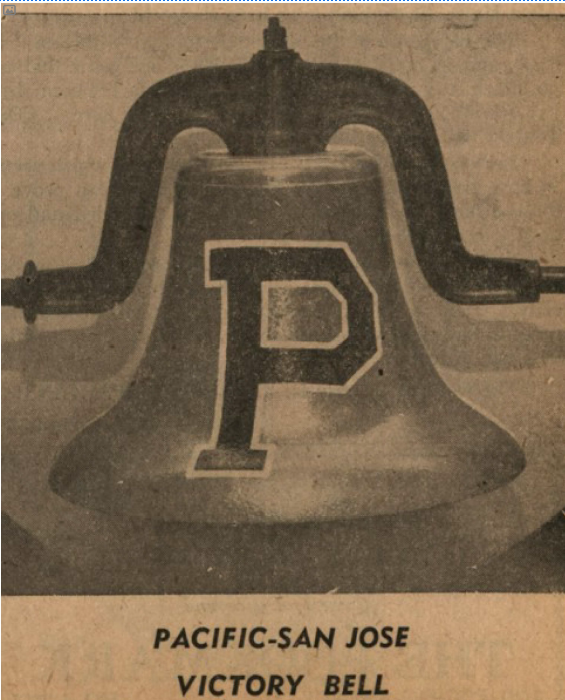
The Pacific-San Jose 'Victory Bell'

The 100-year series between San José State and Pacific began in 1895 with a game held at Pacific, which ended in a 0–0 tie. The first victor of the series came in 1898 when San Jose State won 18–0 at home. Pacific's first win of the series was a 34–0 in 1921 at home.

Ahead of the 1949 game, members of Pacific's Alpha Kappa Phi fraternity commissioned a bell to serve as the trophy for the series. The bell is two feet tall and waist-high on a rolling cart, it features an orange "P" for Pacific on half, and blue with a gold "SJ" for San Jose on the other half.

In 1969, San Jose State became a charter member of the Pacific Coast Athletic Association (which later became the Big West Conference), Pacific joined for football only, becoming a full member two years later, allowing the series to be a conference match-up.

In 1992, San Jose State had their ninth consecutive win, the longest win streak of the series. In 1995, Pacific's Board of Regents voted to disband the football team to save money for the athletic program, which was reported to have gone over $400,000 in debt.

After the dissolution of the series, the Victory Bell trophy was adopted and traded between the school's basketball teams, which happened until 2009. Since 2018, the Victory Bell has been on loan from San Jose State to the San Francisco 49ers Museum at Levi's Stadium as a part of an exhibit on Bay Area college football.

== Statistics ==
Overall, the series is notable for its large amount of blowouts, through the first 66 years (37 games) of the series the losing team only managed to score more than 7 points three times.

Sources:	San José State	Pacific
Games played	72	
Wins	43	23
Ties	6	
Home wins	20	12
Road wins	23	11
Consecutive wins	9	7
Most total points in a game	111 (1991)	
Most points in a win	64 (1991)	46 (1923)
Most points in a loss	35 (1966)	47 (1991)
Fewest total points in a game	0 (1895, 1935)	
Largest margin of victory	41 (1970)	46 (1923)
Smallest margin of victory	1 (1953, 1979, 1992)	2 (1974, 1995)
Total points scored in series	1,472	1,242
Shut-outs of opposing team	12 (1898, 1899, 1932, 1934, 1936, 1941, 1942, 1946, 1951, 1961, 1982, 1984)	7 (1921, 1922, 1923, 1930, 1931, 1947, 1968)

== Game results ==
San Jose State victories	Pacific victories	Tie games

No.	Date	Location	Winner	Score
1	1895	San Jose, CA	Tie	0–0
2	January 25, 1896	San Jose, CA	Tie	6–6
3	1898	San Jose, CA	San Jose State	18–0
4	1899	San Jose, CA	San Jose State	6–0
5	November 5, 1921	San Jose, CA	Pacific	34–0
6	November 24, 1922	San Jose, CA	Pacific	23–0
7	November 3, 1923	San Jose, CA	Pacific	46–0
8	October 26, 1929	San Jose, CA	Tie	6–6
9	October 35, 1930	Stockton, CA	Pacific	27–0
10	November 11, 1931	San Jose, CA	Pacific	27–0
11	October 8, 1932	Stockton, CA	San Jose State	7–0
12	October 16, 1933	San Jose, CA	San Jose State	12–6
13	November 17, 1934	Stockton, CA	San Jose State	13–0
14	October 18, 1935	Stockton, CA	Tie	0–0
15	October 10, 1936	San Jose, CA	San Jose State	8–0
16	October 1, 1937	Stockton, CA	San Jose State	12–7
17	October 14, 1938	San Jose, CA	San Jose State	19–6
18	October 20, 1939	Stockton, CA	San Jose State	13–3
19	November 8, 1940	San Jose, CA	San Jose State	28–7
20	October 24, 1941	Stockton, CA	San Jose State	7–0
21	October 17, 1942	San Jose, CA	San Jose State	29–0
22	November 8, 1946	Stockton, CA	San Jose State	32–0
23	October 31, 1947	San Jose, CA	Pacific	14–0
24	October 30, 1948	Lodi, CA	San Jose State	14–7
25	October 28, 1949	San Jose, CA	Pacific	45–7
26	November 18, 1950	Stockton, CA	Tie	7–7
27	November 23, 1951	San Jose, CA	San Jose State	7–0
28	October 18, 1952	Stockton, CA	San Jose State	26–21
29	November 7, 1953	San Jose, CA	San Jose State	7–6
30	November 6, 1954	Stockton, CA	Pacific	13–7
31	October 22, 1955	San Jose, CA	Pacific	14–7
32	November 10, 1956	Stockton, CA	Pacific	34–7
33	November 9, 1957	San Jose, CA	Pacific	21–6
34	November 8, 1958	Stockton, CA	Pacific	26–13
35	November 20, 1959	Stockton, CA	Pacific	20–7
36	November 5, 1960	Stockton, CA	Pacific	26–20
37	September 22, 1961	San Jose, CA	San Jose State	16–0

No.	Date	Location	Winner	Score
38	November 11, 1961	Stockton, CA	San Jose State	29–26
39	November 3, 1962	Stockton, CA	San Jose State	24–22
40	November 30, 1963	San Jose, CA	San Jose State	32–20
41	October 24, 1964	Stockton, CA	San Jose State	37–13
42	November 6, 1965	San Jose, CA	San Jose State	52–21
43	October 29, 1966	Stockton, CA	Pacific	38–35
44	October 28, 1967	San Jose, CA	Pacific	34–14
45	November 2, 1968	Stockton, CA	Pacific	28–0
46	November 22, 1969	San Jose, CA	San Jose State	15–12
47	October 24, 1970	Stockton, CA	San Jose State	48–7
48	October 30, 1971	San Jose, CA	San Jose State	28–18
49	October 21, 1972	Stockton, CA	Pacific	38–28
50	October 6, 1973	San Jose, CA	Tie	21–21
51	October 26, 1974	San Jose, CA	Pacific	29–27
52	October 18, 1975	San Jose, CA	San Jose State	41–13
53	November 13, 1976	Stockton, CA	San Jose State	50–30
54	October 29, 1977	San Jose, CA	Pacific	24–7
55	November 11, 1978	Stockton, CA	San Jose State	33–31
56	November 10, 1979	San Jose, CA	San Jose State	32–31
57	November 8, 1980	Stockton, CA	San Jose State	28–23
58	November 14, 1981	San Jose, CA	San Jose State	40–25
59	November 13, 1982	Stockton, CA	San Jose State	31–0
60	November 12, 1983	San Jose, CA	Pacific	30–26
61	November 17, 1984	Stockton, CA	San Jose State	33–0
62	October 26, 1985	San Jose, CA	San Jose State	34–26
63	October 25, 1986	Stockton, CA	San Jose State	44–15
64	November 17, 1987	San Jose, CA	San Jose State	42–17
65	October 15, 1988	Stockton, CA	San Jose State	35–17
66	September 23, 1989	San Jose, CA	San Jose State	41–32
67	September 15, 1990	Stockton, CA	San Jose State	28–14
68	October 19, 1991	San Jose, CA	San Jose State	64–47
69	November 14, 1992	Stockton, CA	San Jose State	28–27
70	November 20, 1993	San Jose, CA	Pacific	24–20
71	November 19, 1994	Stockton, CA	San Jose State	28–15
72	October 28, 1995	San Jose, CA	Pacific	32–30
Series: San Jose State leads 43–23–6

== See also ==
- List of NCAA college football rivalry games
