= New Mexico A&M Aggies football, 1893–1899 =

American college football seasons

The New Mexico A&M Aggies football program from 1893 to 1899 represented the represented New Mexico College of Agriculture and Mechanical Arts (now known as New Mexico State University) in its first decade of intercollegiate football.

== 1893 ==
1893 New Mexico A&M Aggies football
- Conference: Independent
- Record: 0–1
- Head coach: William M. Clute (1st season)

The 1893 New Mexico A&M Aggies football team represented New Mexico A&M during the 1893 college football season and was the school's first intercollegiate football team. The team played only one game, losing to New Mexico on January 1, 1894. William M. Clute was the head coach.

=== Schedule ===
Date	Opponent	Site	Result
January 1, 1894	at New Mexico	Albuquerque, MN (rivalry)	L 6–18 (Note: New Mexico cites the final score as 25–5, while New Mexico A&M cites the final as 18–6.)

== 1895 ==
1895 New Mexico A&M Aggies football
- Conference: Independent
- Record: 2–0
- Head coach: Alfred Holt (1st season)

The 1895 New Mexico A&M Aggies football team represented New Mexico A&M during the 1895 college football season and was the school's second intercollegiate football team. The team played two games, compiling a 2–0 record. Alfred Holt was the coach.

=== Schedule ===
Date	Opponent	Site	Result
	El Paso		W 1–0
	El Paso High School		W 10–4

== 1896 ==
1896 New Mexico A&M Aggies football
- Conference: Independent
- Record: 0–2
- Head coach: None

The 1896 New Mexico A&M Aggies football team represented New Mexico A&M during the 1896 college football season. The team played two games, compiling a 0–2 record.

=== Schedule ===
Date	Opponent	Site	Result
	Fort Bliss		L 0–10
	Las Cruces		L 0–6

== 1897 ==
1897 New Mexico A&M Aggies football
- Conference: Independent
- Record: 1–0–1
- Head coach: Charles M. Barber (1st season)

The 1897 New Mexico A&M Aggies football team represented New Mexico A&M during the 1897 college football season. In its first season under head coach Charles M. Barber, the team compiled a 1–0–1 record.

=== Schedule ===
Date	Opponent	Site	Result
	at Fort Bliss		T 0–0
	Fort Bliss		W 10–0

== 1898 ==
1898 New Mexico A&M Aggies football
- Conference: Independent
- Record: 2–1
- Head coach: Charles M. Barber (2nd season)

The 1898 New Mexico A&M Aggies football team represented New Mexico A&M during the 1897 college football season. In its second season under head coach Charles M. Barber, the team compiled a 2–1 record.

=== Schedule ===
Date	Opponent	Site	Result
	El Paso		W 46–0
	at Albuquerque		W 11–0
	at Albuquerque Indian School		L 0–6

== 1899 ==
1899 New Mexico A&M Aggies football
- Conference: Independent
- Record: 1–0
- Head coach: John O. Miller (1st season)
- Home stadium: College Field

The 1899 New Mexico A&M Aggies football team was an American football team that represented New Mexico College of Agriculture and Mechanical Arts (now known as New Mexico State University) during the 1899 college football season. In their first year under head coach John O. Miller, the Aggies compiled a 1–0 record. In the team's only game, the Aggies defeated the team from the U.S. Indian School by a 38–0 score. The team played its home games on College Field, later renamed Miller Field in honor of coach Miller.

=== Schedule ===
Date	Opponent	Site	Result	Source
	U.S. Indian School		W 38–0	
