= List of Oregon State Beavers head football coaches =

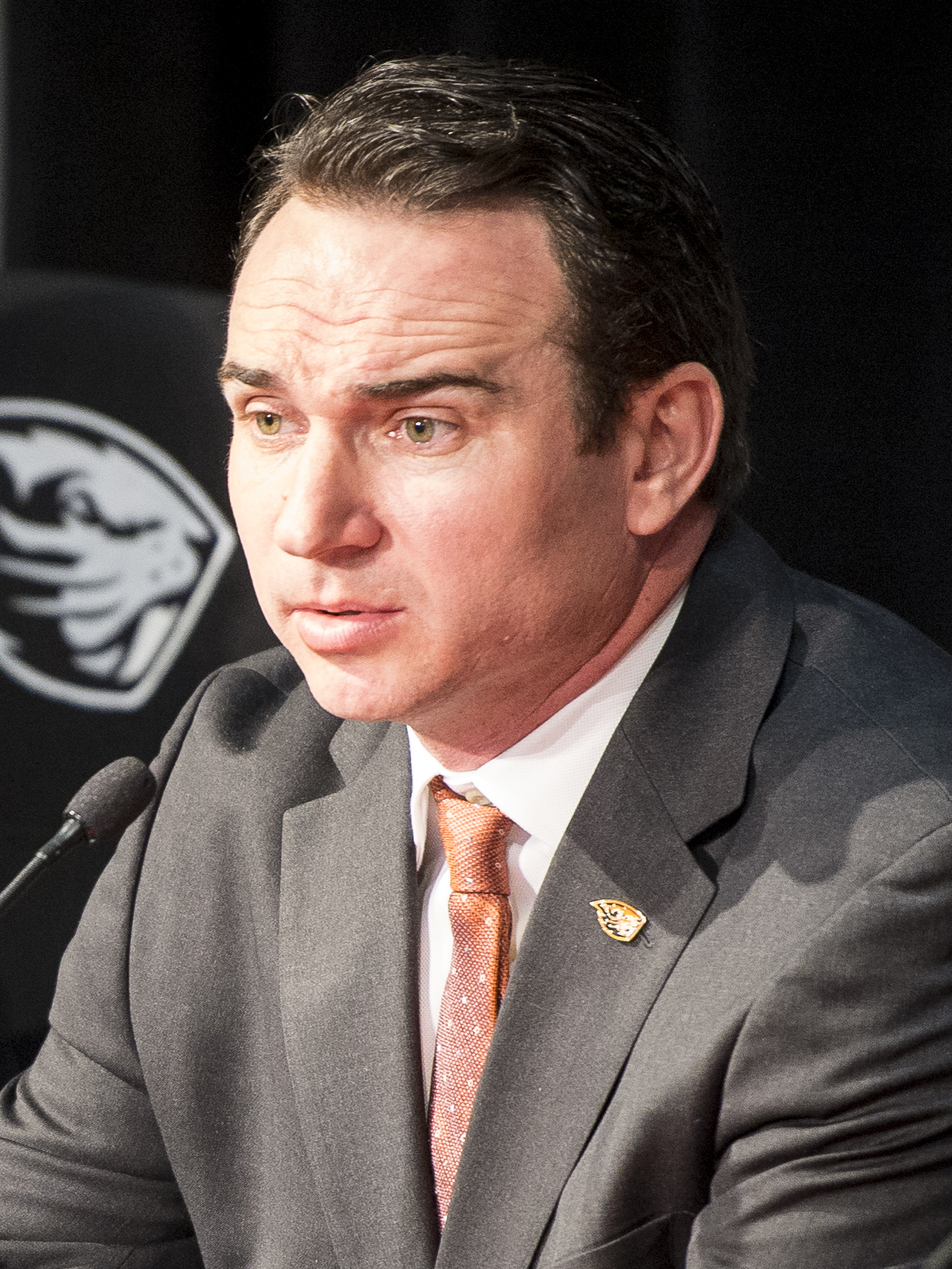
Jonathan Smith served as head coach of the Beavers from 2018 to 2023.

The Oregon State Beavers college football team represents Oregon State University in the Pac-12 Conference (Pac-12). The Beavers compete as part of the NCAA Division I Football Bowl Subdivision. The program has had 33 head coaches and three interim head coaches since it began play during the 1893 season. Since November 2025, JaMarcus Shephard has served as head coach of the Beavers.

Five coaches have led Oregon State in postseason bowl games: Lon Stiner, Tommy Prothro, Dennis Erickson, Mike Riley, and Jonathan Smith. Three of those coaches also won conference championships: Stiner captured one and Prothro two as a member of the Pacific Coast Conference; Prothro captured one as a member of the Athletic Association of Western Universities; and Erickson captured one as a member of the Pacific-10.

Stiner and Riley are tied as leader in seasons coached with 14 years as head coach of the program. Riley has the most all-time wins with 93 and Will Bloss has the highest winning percentage at 0.909. Cory Hall has the lowest winning percentage of those who have coached more than one game, with 0.000. Of the 33 different head coaches who have led the Beavers, Prothro and Erickson have been inducted into the College Football Hall of Fame.

== Key ==
Key to symbols in coaches list
General		Overall		Conference		Postseason (Note: Although the first Rose Bowl Game was played in 1902, it has been continuously played since the 1916 game, and is recognized as the oldest bowl game by the NCAA. "—" indicates any season prior to 1916 when postseason games were not played.)	
No.	Order of coaches (Note: A running total of the number of head coaches, with coaches who served separate tenures being counted only once. Interim head coaches are represented with "Int" and are not counted in the running total. "—" indicates the team played but either without a coach or no coach is on record. "X" indicates an interim year without play.)	GC	Games coached	CW	Conference wins	PW	Postseason wins
DC	Division championships	OW	Overall wins	CL	Conference losses	PL	Postseason losses
CC	Conference championships	OL	Overall losses	CT	Conference ties	PT	Postseason ties
NC	National championships	OT	Overall ties (Note: Overtime rules in college football were introduced in 1996, making ties impossible in the period since.)	C%	Conference winning percentage		
†	Elected to the College Football Hall of Fame	O%	Overall winning percentage (Note: When computing the win–loss percentage, a tie counts as half a win and half a loss.)				

== Coaches ==
List of head football coaches showing season(s) coached, overall records, conference records, postseason records, championships and selected awards (Note: Statistics correct as of the end of the 2025 NCAA Division I FBS football season.)
No.	Name (Note: Oregon State did not have a head coach for their 1898 season.)	Season(s) (Note: Oregon State did not field teams for the 1900, 1901, and 1943–1945 seasons.)	GC	OW	OL	OT	O%	CW	CL	CT	C%	PW	PL	PT	CC	NC	Awards
1; 5	Will Bloss	1893; 1897	11	10	1	0	0.909	—	—	—	—	—	—	—	—	—	—
2	Guy Kennedy	1894	3	2	1	0	0.667	—	—	—	—	—	—	—	—	—	—
3	Paul Downing	1895	3	0	2	1	0.167	—	—	—	—	—	—	—	—	—	—
4	Tommy Code	1896	3	1	2	0	0.333	—	—	—	—	—	—	—	—	—	—
6	Hiland Orlando Stickney	1899	5	3	2	0	0.600	—	—	—	—	—	—	—	—	—	—
7	Fred Herbold	1902	6	4	1	1	0.750	—	—	—	—	—	—	—	—	—	—
8	Thomas L. McFadden	1903	7	2	4	1	0.357	—	—	—	—	—	—	—	—	—	—
9	Allen Steckle	1904–1905	15	10	5	0	0.667	—	—	—	—	—	—	—	—	—	—
10	Fred Norcross	1906–1908	21	14	4	3	0.738	—	—	—	—	—	—	—	—	—	—
11	Sol Metzger	1909	7	4	2	1	0.643	—	—	—	—	—	—	—	—	—	—
12	George Schildmiller	1910	6	3	2	1	0.583	—	—	—	—	—	—	—	—	—	—
13	Sam Dolan	1911–1912	14	8	6	0	0.571	3	4	0	0.429	—	—	—	0	—	—
14	E. J. Stewart	1913–1915	21	15	5	5	0.700	7	3	3	0.654	—	—	—	0	—	—
15	Joseph Pipal	1916–1917	16	8	7	1	0.531	1	4	1	0.250	—	—	—	0	—	—
16	Homer Woodson Hargiss	1918–1919	15	6	8	1	0.433	1	5	0	0.167	—	—	—	0	—	—
17	Dick Rutherford	1920–1923	33	13	14	6	0.485	6	10	3	0.395	—	—	—	0	—	—
18	Paul J. Schissler	1924–1932	80	48	30	2	0.613	22	27	1	0.450	—	—	—	0	—	—
19	Lon Stiner	1933–1942; 1945–1948	140	74	49	17	0.589	49	42	13	0.534	3	0	0	1	—	—
20	Kip Taylor	1949–1954	56	20	36	0	0.357	15	30	0	0.333	0	0	0	0	—	—
21	Tommy Prothro^{†}	1955–1964	102	63	37	2	0.627	25	9	1	0.729	1	2	0	3	—	—
22	Dee Andros	1965–1975	116	51	64	1	0.444	30	37	1	0.449	0	0	0	0	—	—
23	Craig Fertig	1976–1979	45	10	34	1	0.233	5	26	0	0.161	0	0	0	0	—	—
24	Joe Avezzano	1980–1984	55	6	47	2	0.127	2	35	2	0.077	0	0	0	0	—	—
25	Dave Kragthorpe	1985–1990	67	17	48	2	0.269	10	33	2	0.244	0	0	0	0	—	Pac-10 Coach of the Year (1989)
26	Jerry Pettibone	1991–1996	66	13	52	1	0.205	6	41	1	0.135	0	0	0	0	—	—
27; 29	Mike Riley	1997–1998; 2003–2014	173	93	80	—	0.538	58	63	—	0.479	6	2	—	0	—	Pac-10 Coach of the Year (2008)
28	Dennis Erickson^{†}	1999–2002	48	31	17	—	0.646	18	14	—	0.563	1	2	—	1	—	TSN College COY (2000); Pac-10 Coach of the Year (2000)
30	Gary Andersen	2015–2017	30	7	23	—	0.233	3	18	—	0.143	0	0	—	0	—	—
Int.	Cory Hall	2017	6	0	6	—	.000	0	6	—	.000	0	0	—	0	—	—
31	Jonathan Smith	2018–2023	69	34	35	—	0.493	23	29	—	0.442	1	1	—	0	—	Pac-12 Coach of the Year (2022)
Int.	Kefense Hynson	2023	1	0	1	—	.000	0	0	—	–	0	1	—	0	—	—
32	Trent Bray	2024–2025	19	5	14	—	0.263	1	0	—	1.000	0	0	—	0	—	—
Int.	Robb Akey (Note: Trent Bray was fired after an 0–7 start to the 2025 season and was replaced by Robb Akey who served as interim head coach for the remainder of the season.)	2025	5	2	3	—	0.400	0	0	—	–	0	0	—	0	—	—
33	JaMarcus Shephard	2026–present	7	5	2	—	0.714	3	0	—	1.000	0	0	—	0	—	—
