= 1897 Montana football team =

American college football season

1897 Montana football
- Conference: Independent
- Record: 1–2–3
- Head coach: Fred D. Smith (1st season)

1897 Far West college football independents records
	Conf.			Overall
Team	W	L	T	W		L		T
Oregon Agricultural		–		5	–	0	–	0
Washington Agricultural		–		2	–	0	–	0
Wyoming		–		2	–	0	–	0
USC		–		5	–	1	–	0
Stanford		–		4	–	1	–	0
New Mexico A&M		–		1	–	0	–	1
Oregon		–		1	–	1	–	0
Montana		–		1	–	2	–	3
Washington		–		1	–	2	–	0
Montana Agricultural		–		1	–	3	–	0
California		–		0	–	3	–	2
Utah		–		1	–	5	–	0
Arizona Normal		–		0	–	1	–	0
Idaho		–		0	–	1	–	0
Nevada State		–		0	–	1	–	0

The 1897 Montana football team represented the University of Montana in the 1897 college football season. They were led by first-year head coach Fred D. Smith.

== Schedule ==
Date	Opponent	Site	Result	Source
October 22	Missoula Tigers	Missoula, MT	T 0–0	
October 29	Missoula Tigers	Missoula, MT	T 0–0	
November 5	Missoula Tigers	Missoula, MT	T 0–0	
November 12	Butte Business College	Missoula, MT	L 4–20	
November 25	Montana Agricultural	Missoula, MT (rivalry)	W 18–6	
December 4	at Butte Business College	Butte, MT	L 10–28	
