= DJ Uiagalelei =

American football player (born 2001)

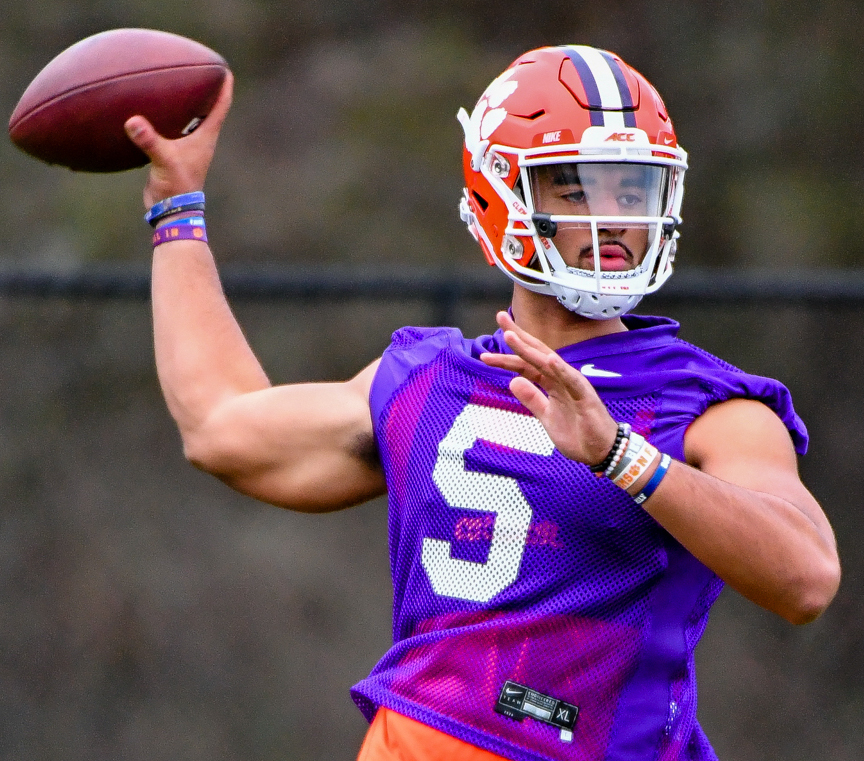
- Uiagalelei with the Clemson Tigers in 2020

No. 7 – Los Angeles Chargers
- Position: Quarterback
- Roster status: Active

Personal information
- Born: April 17, 2001 (age 25); Riverside, California, U.S.
- Listed height: 6 ft 4 in (1.93 m)
- Listed weight: 252 lb (114 kg)

Career information
- High school: St. John Bosco (Bellflower, California)
- College: Clemson (2020–2022); Oregon State (2023); Florida State (2024)
- NFL draft: 2025: undrafted

Career history
- Los Angeles Chargers (2025–present)

Career NFL statistics as of Week 9, 2026
- Passing attempts: 7
- Passing completions: 2
- Completion percentage: 28.6%
- TD–INT: 1–0
- Passing yards: 24
- Passer rating: 81.0
- Stats at Pro Football Reference

David John Uiagalelei (/uiˌʌŋɡələˈleɪ/ oo-ee-UNG-gə-lə-LAY; born April 17, 2001) is an American professional football quarterback for the Los Angeles Chargers of the National Football League (NFL). He played college football for the Clemson Tigers, Oregon State Beavers, and Florida State Seminoles. He signed with the Chargers as an undrafted free agent in 2025.

== Early life ==
Uiagalelei, who is of Samoan descent, attended St. John Bosco High School in Bellflower, California. As a junior in 2018, he was the USA Today High School Offensive Player of the Year after throwing for 3,366 yards and 48 touchdowns. As a senior, he passed for 4,225 yards and 48 touchdowns. Uiagalelei also played baseball in high school.

A five-star recruit, Uiagalelei committed to Clemson University to play college football on May 5, 2019. He signed with them on December 18, 2019, and enrolled at Clemson on January 8, 2020.

College recruiting
| Name | Hometown | School | Height | Weight | Commit date |
|---|---|---|---|---|---|
| DJ Uiagalelei; QB | Bellflower, California | St. John Bosco High School | 6 ft 4 in (1.93 m) | 245 lb (111 kg) | May 5, 2019 |
| DJ Uiagalelei; QB | Recruit ratings: Rivals: 247Sports: ESPN: | | | | |
Overall recruit ranking:
Note: In many cases, Scout, Rivals, 247Sports, On3, and ESPN may conflict in their listings of height and weight.; In these cases, the average was taken. ESPN grades are on a 100-point scale.; Sources: "2020 Team Ranking". Rivals.com.

== College career ==
=== Clemson ===
Uiagalelei started his first game for Clemson on October 31, 2020, against Boston College. He replaced Trevor Lawrence, who was ruled out after testing positive for COVID-19. Uiagalelei completed 31 passes on 40 attempts for 342 yards and 2 touchdowns in leading Clemson to a comeback victory after being down by 18 points in the first half. He started a second game in place of Lawrence the following week on November 7, 2020, against undefeated Notre Dame; Clemson lost to the Irish in an overtime thriller, 47-40, despite another impressive performance by Uiagalelei, who completed 29 of 44 passes for 439 yards and 2 touchdowns.

In 2021, after Trevor Lawrence left for the NFL, Uiagalelei became Clemson's starting quarterback. The Tigers were ranked #3 in the nation in the preseason poll. He signed a deal with Dr. Pepper and Bojangles to appear in their commercials throughout the season. Clemson's first challenge of the season would come against the then #5 Georgia Bulldogs. Uiagalelei played poorly, going 19-for-37 on pass attempts, threw for 178 yards, no touchdowns, and an interception. The game's only touchdown came from a pick six thrown by Uiagalelei. Clemson ultimately lost the opener, 10–3.

After being benched in favor of five star freshman Cade Klubnik during the 2022 ACC Championship Game, Uiagalelei announced his decision to enter the transfer portal on December 4, 2022.

=== Oregon State ===
On December 24, 2022, Uiagalelei announced that he would be transferring to Oregon State University of the Pac-12 Conference.

On August 22, 2023, Oregon State named Uiagalelei the starting quarterback over Ben Gulbranson and Aidan Chiles. After the 2023 regular season, it was announced on November 30 that Uiagalelei would again enter the transfer portal, following head coach Jonathan Smith's decision to leave OSU for Michigan State.

=== Florida State ===
On January 1, 2024, Uiagalelei announced that he would be transferring to Florida State University for his final year of eligibility. In a game against SMU, Uiagalelei injured his hand and was ruled out for an extended period of time. In 5 starts for the team, he totaled 1,065 yards, 4 touchdowns, and 6 interceptions with 84 completions on 156 attempts.

On December 16, 2024, Uiagalelei declared for the 2025 NFL draft.

=== College statistics ===
| Season | Team | Games | | | Passing | | | | | | | | Rushing | | | |
| Season | Team | GP | GS | Record | Cmp | Att | Pct | Yds | Avg | TD | Int | Rate | Att | Yds | Avg | TD |
|---|---|---|---|---|---|---|---|---|---|---|---|---|---|---|---|---|
| 2020 | Clemson | 10 | 2 | 1−1 | 78 | 117 | 66.7 | 914 | 7.8 | 5 | 0 | 146.4 | 28 | 60 | 2.1 | 4 |
| 2021 | Clemson | 13 | 13 | 10−3 | 208 | 374 | 55.6 | 2,246 | 6.0 | 9 | 10 | 108.7 | 105 | 308 | 2.9 | 4 |
| 2022 | Clemson | 13 | 13 | 11−2 | 229 | 369 | 62.1 | 2,521 | 6.8 | 22 | 7 | 135.5 | 142 | 545 | 3.8 | 7 |
| 2023 | Oregon State | 12 | 12 | 8−4 | 180 | 315 | 57.1 | 2,638 | 8.4 | 21 | 7 | 145.0 | 68 | 219 | 3.2 | 6 |
| 2024 | Florida State | 5 | 5 | 1−4 | 84 | 156 | 53.8 | 1,065 | 6.8 | 4 | 6 | 112.0 | 37 | 8 | 0.2 | 0 |
| Career | | 53 | 45 | 31−14 | 779 | 1,331 | 58.5 | 9,384 | 7.1 | 61 | 30 | 128.4 | 380 | 1,124 | 3.0 | 21 |

=== Collegiate awards and honors ===
- 2x ACC Champion (2020, 2022)
- Cheez-It Bowl Champion (2021)
- Pac-12 Week 6 Offensive Player of the Week (2023)
- ACC Week 4 Quarterback of the Week (2022)
- 2x ACC Rookie of the Week (2020 Week 8 and Week 9)

== Professional career ==
Pre-draft measurables
| Height | Weight | Arm length | Hand span | Wingspan |
|---|---|---|---|---|
| 6 ft 4 1/4 in (1.94 m) | 229 lb (104 kg) | 31 5/8 in (0.80 m) | 9 7/8 in (0.25 m) | 6 ft 6 5/8 in (2.00 m) |
All values from Pro Day

=== 2025 ===
After going unselected in the 2025 NFL draft, Uiagalelei signed with the Los Angeles Chargers as an undrafted free agent on April 26, 2025. He was waived on August 26 as part of final roster cuts and re-signed with the Chargers practice squad the following day. On January 13, 2026, Uiagalelei signed a reserve/futures contract with Los Angeles.

=== 2026 ===
Uiagalelei competed with Trey Lance for the team's backup quarterback position behind Justin Herbert. Uiagalelei was ultimately cut by Los Angeles as a part of final roster cuts on August 30, 2026; he was re-signed to the team's practice squad the following day. He was signed to the active roster on September 26.

After Lance was placed on injured reserve on October 10, Uiagalelei was promoted to the backup role. In a Week 9 loss to the Houston Texans, he took over when Herbert suffered a finger injury late and threw a 15-yard touchdown pass to Derius Davis.

== Personal life ==
Uiagalelei is a Christian. He attended regular Bible study while at Clemson and wears wristbands with Bible verses on them including Jeremiah 33:3, Philippians 4:13, Ephesians 6:10, and Romans 12:2.

Uiagalelei has a younger brother, Matayo, who plays defensive end for the Oregon Ducks.

Uiagalelei was drafted by the Los Angeles Dodgers of Major League Baseball in the 20th round of the 2023 MLB draft, but did not sign.
