= 1897 Arizona Normal Normals football team =

American college football season

1897 Arizona Normal Normals football
- Conference: Independent
- Record: 0–1
- Head coach: Frederick M. Irish (1st season)

1897 Far West college football independents records
	Conf.			Overall
Team	W	L	T	W		L		T
Oregon Agricultural		–		5	–	0	–	0
Washington Agricultural		–		2	–	0	–	0
Wyoming		–		2	–	0	–	0
USC		–		5	–	1	–	0
Stanford		–		4	–	1	–	0
New Mexico A&M		–		1	–	0	–	1
Oregon		–		1	–	1	–	0
Montana		–		1	–	2	–	3
Washington		–		1	–	2	–	0
Montana Agricultural		–		1	–	3	–	0
California		–		0	–	3	–	2
Utah		–		1	–	5	–	0
Arizona Normal		–		0	–	1	–	0
Idaho		–		0	–	1	–	0
Nevada State		–		0	–	1	–	0

The 1897 Arizona Normal Normals football team was an American football team that represented the Arizona Normal School (later renamed Arizona State University) as an independent during the 1897 college football season. In its first season of varsity football, the Tempe Normal team compiled a 0–1 record, losing to the Phoenix Indian School by a 38 to 20 score. The team captain was Walter Shute.

The Arizona Normal football program was organized by Frederick M. Irish who came to Arizona Normal School in 1896 as a science teacher after graduating from the University of Iowa. He remained the football coach at Arizona Normal for the program's first seven years.

== Schedule ==
Date	Opponent	Site	Result	Source
October 16	Phoenix Indian School	Tempe, Arizona Territory	L 20–38	
