= William H. Harrelson =

American football player and coach

Playing career
- 1894: Stanford
- Position: Quarterback

Coaching career (HC unless noted)
- 1897: Nevada State

Head coaching record
- Overall: 0–1

William H. Harrelson was the second head football coach at Nevada State University (now known as the University of Nevada, Reno). This was his only season as a collegiate head coach.

Prior to coaching, Harrelson had been the starting quarterback at Stanford University.

The main resource for this article, the 1901 yearbook Artemesia, gives very little information regarding his brief tenure at the helm of the Sagebrushers (later Wolf Pack). The following is an excerpt from "The Development of Athletics in the University" from that issue:

In 1897, the football team was reorganized and coached by Harrelson of Stanford. A game with the Berkeley second eleven resulted in another defeat (the team having gone 0–2 the prior year [the first of the team's existence] under Frank Taylor), but the score was much smaller than before. The improvement shown by the football team encouraged the students to organize other athletic teams. In the following spring a baseball team, a track team, and a basketball team were formed.

== Head coaching record ==
Year	Team	Overall	Conference	Standing	Bowl/playoffs
Nevada State Sagebrushers (Independent) (1897)
1897	Nevada State	0–1			
Nevada State:		0–1			
Total:		0–1			
