= Joe Smith (American football coach) =

American football player and coach (1873–1923)

Biographical details
- Born: October 21, 1873; Oregon, U.S.
- Died: October 21, 1923 (aged 50); Portland, Oregon, U.S.

Playing career
- 1893–1894: Multnomah Athletic Club
- Position: Fullback

Coaching career (HC unless noted)
- 1896: Multnomah Athletic Club
- 1897: Oregon

Head coaching record
- Overall: 1–1 (college)

Joseph Harker Smith (October 21, 1873 – October 17, 1923) was an American football player and coach. He served as the head football coach at the Multnomah Athletic Club in 1896 and at the University of Oregon in 1897.

== Head coaching record ==
=== College ===
Year	Team	Overall	Conference	Standing	Bowl/playoffs
Oregon Webfoots (Independent) (1897)
1897	Oregon	1–1			
Oregon:		1–1			
Total:		1–1			
