= 2023 Oregon State Beavers football team =

American college football season

2023 Oregon State Beavers football

Sun Bowl, L 8–40 vs. Notre Dame
- Conference: Pac-12 Conference
- Record: 8–5 (5–4 Pac-12)
- Head coach: Jonathan Smith (6th season; regular season); Kefense Hynson (interim, bowl game)
- Offensive coordinator: Brian Lindgren (6th season)
- Offensive scheme: Multiple
- Defensive coordinator: Trent Bray (2nd season)
- Base defense: 3–4
- Home stadium: Reser Stadium

2023 Pac-12 Conference football standings
	Conf.			Overall
Team	W		L	W		L
No. 2 Washington y$^	9	–	0	14	–	1
No. 6 Oregon y	8	–	1	12	–	2
No. 11 Arizona	7	–	2	10	–	3
Oregon State	5	–	4	8	–	5
Utah	5	–	4	8	–	5
USC	5	–	4	8	–	5
California	4	–	5	6	–	7
UCLA	4	–	5	8	–	5
Washington State	2	–	7	5	–	7
Stanford	2	–	7	3	–	9
Arizona State*	2	–	7	3	–	9
Colorado	1	–	8	4	–	8
Championship: Washington 34, Oregon 31
^ – College Football Playoff participant; $ – Conference champion; y – Championship game participant; * – Ineligible for postseason play due to self-imposed ban for 2020 recruiting violations; Rankings from AP Poll

The 2023 Oregon State Beavers football team represented Oregon State University in the Pac–12 Conference during the 2023 NCAA Division I FBS football season. Led by sixth-year head coach Jonathan Smith, the Beavers played their home games on campus at Reser Stadium in Corvallis, Oregon. The Oregon State Beavers football team drew an average home attendance of 36,969 in 2023.

== Offseason ==
=== Coaching staff changes ===
==== Departures ====
Name	Position	New team	New position
A. J. Steward	Running backs coach	Baylor	Assistant head coach/running backs coach
Brian Michalowski	Defensive quality control coach	Oregon	Defensive analyst
Ryan Saparto	Special teams quality control coach	None	None
Jacob Alsadek	Offensive graduate assistant	Albany	Offensive line coach
Jeremy Bruce	Defensive graduate assistant	SMU	Defensive graduate assistant
A. J. Cooper	Defensive graduate assistant	Sacramento State	Linebackers coach

=== Players drafted into the NFL ===
Round	Pick	NFL team	Player	Position
2	42	Green Bay Packers	Luke Musgrave	TE
7	252	Buffalo Bills	Alex Austin	CB
Undrafted		San Francisco 49ers	Jack Colletto	FB
Undrafted		Las Vegas Raiders	Jaydon Grant	S
Undrafted		Tennessee Titans	Tre'Shaun Harrison	WR
Undrafted		Baltimore Ravens	Brandon Kipper	OT
Undrafted		Seattle Seahawks	Tyjon Lindsey	WR
Undrafted		Carolina Panthers	Rejzohn Wright	CB

=== Transfers ===
==== Outgoing ====
The Beavers lost 10 players to the transfer portal.

Player	Number	Position	Height	Weight	Class	Hometown	New school
J. T. Byrne	#87	TE	6'5"	246	(redshirt) Freshman	Carmel, CA	California
John Dunmore	#14	WR	6'2"	173	(redshirt) Sophomore	Hollywood, FL	Towson
Tristan Gebbia	#3	QB	6'2"	203	(redshirt) Senior	Calabasas, CA	Ohio State
Jam Griffin	#8	RB	5'9"	210	(redshirt) Junior	Rome, GA	Ole Miss
Ron Hardge III	#21	DB	6'1"	175	Senior	Fort Lauderdale, FL	Colorado State
Fred Martin III	#23	DB	5'11"	170	Freshman	Inglewood, CA	Citrus College
Chance Nolan	#10	QB	6'2"	186	(redshirt) Junior	Menifee, CA	TCU
Trevor Pope	#80	WR	6'1"	165	(redshirt) Freshman	Tracy, CA	Withdrew
Johnathan Riley	#17	DB	6'2"	183	(redshirt) Junior	Waldorf, MD	Central Connecticut State
Omar Speights	#1	ILB	6'1"	227	Junior	Corvallis, OR	LSU

==== Incoming ====
The Beavers added 7 players from the transfer portal.

Player	Number	Position	Height	Weight	Class	Hometown	Previous school
Calvin Hart	#5	LB	6'1"	207	(redshirt) Senior	Fort Lauderdale, FL	Illinois
Oluwaseyi Omotosho	#44	EDGE	6'2"	205	(redshirt) Sophomore	Richmond, TX	Wyoming
Jacob Schuster	#62	DL	6'2"	300	(redshirt) Sophomore	Lacey, WA	Minnesota
Grant Starck	#71	OT	6'5"	280	Senior	Springfield, OR	Nevada
Jermaine Terry II	#4	TE	6'4"	235	Junior	Richmond, CA	California
Mason Tufaga	#44	LB	6'1"	210	(redshirt) Sophomore	Honolulu, HI	Utah
DJ Uiagalelei	#5	QB	6'5"	245	Junior	Bellflower, CA	Clemson

== Preseason ==
=== Pac-12 media day ===
==== Pac-12 media poll ====
In the Pac-12 preseason media poll, Oregon State was voted to finish in fifth place.

=== Preseason All–Pac-12 team ===
The Beavers had 12 players selected to the preseason all–Pac-12 team.

Offense

1st team

Damien Martinez – RB

Joshua Gray – OL

Taliese Fuaga – OL

2nd team

Jake Levengood – OL

Defense

1st team

Kitan Oladapo – DB

Special teams

1st team

Anthony Gould – RS

2nd team

Silas Bolden – RS

== Schedule ==
Date	Time	Opponent	Rank	Site	TV	Result	Attendance
September 3	12:30 p.m.	at San Jose State*	No. 18	CEFCU Stadium; San Jose, CA	CBS	W 42–17	20,337
September 9	6:00 p.m.	UC Davis*	No. 16	Reser Stadium; Corvallis, OR	P12N	W 55–7	35,728
September 16	12:30 p.m.	San Diego State*	No. 16	Reser Stadium; Corvallis, OR	FS1	W 26–9	35,591
September 23	4:00 p.m.	at No. 21 Washington State	No. 14	Martin Stadium; Pullman, WA	FOX	L 35–38	33,024
September 29	6:00 p.m.	No. 10 Utah	No. 19	Reser Stadium; Corvallis, OR	FS1	W 21–7	37,372
October 7	7:00 p.m.	at California	No. 15	California Memorial Stadium; Berkeley, CA	P12N	W 52–40	34,930
October 14	5:00 p.m.	No. 18 UCLA^{†}	No. 15	Reser Stadium; Corvallis, OR	FOX	W 36–24	37,600
October 28	7:30 p.m.	at Arizona	No. 11	Arizona Stadium; Tucson, AZ	ESPN	L 24–27	45,023
November 4	7:00 p.m.	at Colorado	No. 16	Folsom Field; Boulder, CO	ESPN	W 26–19	52,725
November 11	2:30 p.m.	Stanford	No. 12	Reser Stadium; Corvallis, OR	P12N	W 62–17	37,107
November 18	4:30 p.m.	No. 5 Washington	No. 11	Reser Stadium; Corvallis, OR	ABC	L 20–22	38,415
November 24	5:30 p.m.	at No. 6 Oregon	No. 16	Autzen Stadium; Eugene, OR (rivalry)	FOX	L 7–31	59,987
December 29	11:00 a.m.	vs. No. 16 Notre Dame	No. 19	Sun Bowl; El Paso, TX (Sun Bowl)	CBS	L 8–40	48,223
*Non-conference game; ^{†}Homecoming; Rankings from AP Poll (and CFP Rankings, after October 31) - Released prior to game; All times are in Pacific time

== Game summaries ==
=== at San Jose State ===
No. 18 Oregon State Beavers (0–0) at San Jose State Spartans (0–1) – Game summary

Quarter	1	2	3	4	Total
No. 18 Beavers	7	14	7	14	42
Spartans	0	3	0	14	17

at CEFCU Stadium • San Jose, California

- Date: September 3
- Game time: 12:30 p.m.
- Game weather: Cloudy • Temperature: 75 °F (24 °C) • Wind: N at 6 miles per hour (9.7 km/h)
- Game attendance: 20,337
- Referee: Mike McCabe
- TV announcers (CBS): Chris Lewis (play-by-play), Ross Tucker (analyst), and Justin Walters (sideline reporter)

Game information

First quarter

- (5:51) ORST – DJ Uiagalelei 1-yard run, Atticus Sappington kick (Drive: 11 plays, 82 yards, 6:32; Oregon State 7–0)

Second quarter

- (9:24) SJSU – Kyler Halvorsen 41-yard field goal (Drive: 10 plays, 37 yards, 5:30; Oregon State 7–3)
- (4:21) ORST – Jack Velling 14-yard pass from DJ Uiagalelei, Atticus Sappington kick (Drive: 10 plays, 73 yards, 4:58; Oregon State 14–3)
- (0:14) ORST – DJ Uiagalelei 1-yard run, Atticus Sappington kick (Drive: 6 plays, 64 yards, 1:46; Oregon State 21–3)

Third quarter

- (6:02) ORST – Jeremiah Noga 31-yard pass from DJ Uiagalelei, Atticus Sappington kick (Drive: 6 plays, 55 yards, 2:43; Oregon State 28–3)

Fourth quarter

- (14:52) SJSU – Sam Olson 0-yard run, Kyler Halvorsen kick (Drive: 5 plays, 22 yards, 1:37; Oregon State 28–10)
- (10:13) ORST – Anthony Gould 28-yard pass from DJ Uiagalelei, Atticus Sappington kick (Drive: 7 plays, 65 yards, 4:35; Oregon State 35–10)
- (3:13) ORST – Deshaun Fenwick 3-yard run, Atticus Sappington kick (Drive: 7 plays, 54 yards, 3:13; Oregon State 42–10)
- (0:04) SJSU – Branden Alvarez 19-yard pass from Jay Butterfield, Kyler Halvorsen kick (Drive: 10 plays, 75 yards, 3:09; Oregon State 42–17)

Statistics	ORST	SJSU
First downs	27	20
Plays–yards	63–473	64–279
Rushes–yards	35–197	22–56
Passing yards	276	223
Passing: comp–att–int	22–28–0	25–42–0
Time of possession	31:55	28:05

Team	Category	Player	Statistics
Oregon State	Passing	DJ Uiagalelei	20/25, 239 yards, 3 TD
Oregon State	Rushing	Damien Martinez	18 carries, 145 yards
Oregon State	Receiving	Anthony Gould	3 receptions, 59 yards, TD
San Jose State	Passing	Chevan Cordeiro	18/32, 152 yards
San Jose State	Rushing	Quali Conley	11 carries, 34 yards
San Jose State	Receiving	Sam Olson	6 receptions, 60 yards

=== vs No. 15 UC Davis (FCS) ===
No. 16 Oregon State Beavers (1-0) vs No. 15 (FCS) UC Davis Aggies (1-0) – Game summary

Quarter	1	2	3	4	Total
No. 15 (FCS) Aggies	0	0	0	7	7
No. 16 Beavers	14	24	10	7	55

at Reser Stadium • Corvallis, Oregon

- Date: September 9
- Game time: 9:00 p.m. EST/6:00 p.m. PST
- Game weather: Clear, 79 °F (26 °C)
- Game attendance: 35,728
- Referee: Justin Elliott
- TV announcers (P12N): Roxy Bernstein (play-by-play), Lincoln Kennedy (analyst)
- Spread: Oregon State –24.0 • Odds to win: •

Game information

First quarter

- (12:09) OSU – Damien Martinez 64 Yd Run, Atticus Sappington Kick (Drive: 1 play, 64 yards, 0:10; Oregon State 7–0)
- (3:57) OSU – DJ Uiagalelei 3 Yd Run, Atticus Sappington Kick (Drive: 4 plays, 48 yards, 1:55; Oregon State 14–0)

Second quarter

- (14:54) OSU – Rweha Munyagi Jr. 5 Yd pass from DJ Uiagalelei, Atticus Sappington Kick (Drive: 6 plays, 59 yards, 2:11; Oregon State 21–0)
- (12:29) OSU – Silas Bolden 65 Yd Punt Return, Atticus Sappington Kick (Drive: 3 plays, 1 yard, 2:25; Oregon State 28–0)
- (5:30) OSU – Silas Bolden 22 Yd pass from DJ Uiagalelei, Atticus Sappington Kick (Drive: 9 plays, 70 yards, 4:28; Oregon State 35–0)
- (2:09) OSU – Atticus Sappington 40 Yd Field Goal (Drive: 4 plays, 7 yards, 2:03; Oregon State 38–0)

Third quarter

- (12:00) OSU – Atticus Sappington 40 Yd Field Goal (Drive: 7 plays, 30 yards, 2:47; Oregon State 41–0)
- (3:53) OSU – Riley Sharp 10 Yd pass from Aidan Chiles, Atticus Sappington Kick (Drive: 9 plays, 86 yards, 4:59; Oregon State 48–0)

Fourth quarter

- (9:41) OSU – Aidan Chiles 1 Yd Run, Atticus Sappington Kick (Drive: 14 plays, 89 yards, 7:07; Oregon State 55–0)
- (5:06) UCD – C.J. Hutton 9 Yd pass from Grant Harper, Hunter Ridley Kick (Drive: 10 plays, 75 yards, 4:35; Oregon State 55–7)

Statistics	UCD	OSU
First downs	12	23
Plays–yards	59–166	63–450
Rushes–yards	29–47	37–269
Passing yards	199	181
Passing: comp–att–int	17–30–1	17–26–0
Turnovers		
Time of possession	28:16	31:44

Team	Category	Player	Statistics
UC Davis	Passing	Grant Harper	4/7, 56 yards, TD
UC Davis	Rushing	Lan Larison	15 carries, 55 yards
UC Davis	Receiving	Andre Crump Jr.	2 receptions, 42 yards
No. 16 Oregon State	Passing	DJ Uiagalelei	8/13, 107 yards, 2 TD
No. 16 Oregon State	Rushing	Damien Martinez	7 carries, 104 yards, TD
No. 16 Oregon State	Receiving	Silas Bolden	4 receptions, 65 yards, TD

=== vs San Diego State ===
No. 16 Oregon State Beavers (2-0) vs San Diego State Aztecs (2-1) – Game summary

Quarter	1	2	3	4	Total
Aztecs	0	3	0	6	9
No. 16 Beavers	3	9	7	7	26

at Reser Stadium • Corvallis, Oregon

- Date: September 16
- Game time: 3:30 p.m. EST/12:30 p.m. PST
- Game weather: Sunny, Temperature: 77 °F (25 °C), Wind: N 2 mph
- Game attendance: 35,591
- Referee: Chris Wiggins
- TV announcers (FS1): Alex Faust (play-by-play), Petros Papadakis (analyst)
- Spread: • Odds to win: •

Game information

First quarter

- (7:57) OSU – Atticus Sappington 48 Yd Field Goal (Drive: 10 plays, 60 yards, 4:48; Oregon State 3–0)

Second quarter

- (13:36) OSU – Atticus Sappington 48 Yd Field Goal (Drive: 11 plays, 43 yards, 3:42; Oregon State 6–0)
- (8:32) OSU – Joshua Gray 3 Yd Run, Two-Point Run Conversion Failed (Drive: 6 plays, 80 yards, 2:48; Oregon State 12–0)
- (0:44) SDSU – Jack Browning 52 Yd Field Goal (Drive: 8 plays, 31 yards, 1:21; Oregon State 12–3)

Third quarter

- (7:40) OSU – DJ Uiagalelei 1 Yd Run, Atticus Sappington Kick (Drive: 7 plays, 84 yards, 3:36; Oregon State 19–3)

Fourth quarter

- (9:01) SDSU – Jaylon Armstead 6 Yd Run, Two-Point Run Conversion Failed (Drive: 9 plays, 57 yards, 5:08; Oregon State 19–9)
- (8:48) OSU – Anthony Gould 75 Yd pass from DJ Uiagalelei, Atticus Sappington Kick (Drive: 1 play, 75 yards, 0:13; Oregon State 26–9)

Statistics	SDSU	OSU
First downs	18	20
Plays–yards	66–326	62–475
Rushes–yards	34–70	32–191
Passing yards	256	475
Passing: comp–att–int	20–32–1	14–30–2
Turnovers		
Time of possession	33:21	26:39

Team	Category	Player	Statistics
San Diego State	Passing	Jalen Mayden	20/32, 256 yards, INT
San Diego State	Rushing	Jaylon Armstead	11 carries, 48 yards, TD
San Diego State	Receiving	Mark Redman	4 receptions, 77 yards
Oregon State	Passing	DJ Uiagalelei	14/30, 284 yards, TD, INT
Oregon State	Rushing	Damien Martinez	15 carries, 102 yards
Oregon State	Receiving	Anthony Gould	3 receptions, 97 yards, TD

=== At No. 21 Washington State ===
No. 14 Oregon State Beavers (3-0) at No. 21 Washington State Cougars (3-0) – Game summary

Quarter	1	2	3	4	Total
No. 14 Beavers	7	7	0	21	35
No. 21 Cougars	14	14	7	3	38

at Martin Stadium • Pullman, Washington

- Date: September 23
- Game time: 4:00 p.m.
- Game attendance: 33,024
- TV announcers (FOX): Jeff Levering (play-by-play), Mark Helfrich (analyst)
- Spread: • Odds to win: •

Game information

First quarter

- (14:10) WSU – Kyle Williams 63 Yd pass from Cameron Ward, Dean Janikowski Kick (Drive: 2 plays, 75 yards, 0:45; Washington State 7–0)
- (7:57) WSU – Cameron Ward 1 Yd Run, Dean Janikowski Kick (Drive: 9 plays, 90 yards, 3:42; Washington State 14–0)
- (3:48) OSU – Deshaun Fenwick 38 Yd Run, Atticus Sappington Kick (Drive: 9 plays, 75 yards, 4:09; Washington State 14–7)

Second quarter

- (14:49) WSU – Josh Kelly 44 Yd pass from Cameron Ward, Dean Janikowski Kick (Drive: 8 plays, 75 yards, 3:59; Washington State 21–7)
- (5:35) OSU – Deshaun Fenwick 9 Yd Run, Atticus Sappington Kick (Drive: 6 plays, 78 yards, 3:07; Washington State 21–14)
- (0:10) WSU – Josh Kelly 11 Yd pass from Cameron Ward, Dean Janikowski Kick (Drive: 6 plays, 55 yards, 2:02; Washington State 28–14)

Third quarter

- (5:15) WSU – Josh Kelly 19 Yd pass from Cameron Ward, Dean Janikowski Kick (Drive: 12 plays, 83 yards, 4:49; Washington State 35–14)

Fourth quarter

- (14:14) OSU – DJ Uiagalelei 26 Yd Run, Atticus Sappington Kick (Drive: 11 plays, 75 yards, 6:01; Washington State 35–21)
- (9:12) WSU – Dean Janikowski 44 Yd Field Goal (Drive: 9 plays, 48 yards, 5:02; Washington State 38–21)
- (6:18) OSU – Deshaun Fenwick 4 Yd Run, Atticus Sappington Kick (Drive: 9 plays, 75 yards, 2:54; Washington State 38–28)
- (1:12) OSU – Jack Velling 5 Yd pass from DJ Uiagalelei, Atticus Sappington Kick (Drive: 13 plays, 98 yards, 2:46; Washington State 38–35)

Statistics	OSU	WSU
First downs	25	27
Plays–yards	73–440	65–528
Rushes–yards	39–242	30–106
Passing yards	198	422
Passing: comp–att–int	17–34–1	29–35–0
Turnovers	1	2
Time of possession	31:33	28:27

Team	Category	Player	Statistics
Oregon State	Passing	DJ Uiagalelei	17/24, 198 yards, TD, INT
Oregon State	Rushing	Deshaun Fenwick	11 carries, 101 yards, 3 TD
Oregon State	Receiving	Silas Bolden	5 receptions, 76 yards
Washington State	Passing	Cam Ward	28/34, 404 yards, 4 TD
Washington State	Rushing	Nakia Watson	8 carries, 46 yards
Washington State	Receiving	Kyle Williams	7 receptions, 174 yards, TD

=== vs No. 10 Utah ===
No. 19 Oregon State Beavers (3-1) vs No. 10 Utah Utes (4-0) – Game summary

Quarter	1	2	3	4	Total
No. 10 Utes	0	0	0	7	7
No. 19 Beavers	7	0	7	7	21

at Reser Stadium • Corvallis, Oregon

- Date: September 29
- Game time: 9:00 p.m. EST/6:00 p.m. PST
- Game weather: Cloudy, 59 °F (15 °C)
- Game attendance: 37,372
- Referee: Jeff Dahle
- TV announcers (FS1): Tim Brando (play-by-play), Spencer Tillman (analyst)
- Spread: • Odds to win: •

Game information

First quarter

- (5:46) OSU – Damien Martinez 4 Yd Run, Atticus Sappington Kick (Drive: 11 plays, 65 yards, 5:24; Oregon State 7–0)

Second quarter

- No scoring plays

Third quarter

- (10:43) OSU – Silas Bolden 27 Yd pass from DJ Uiagalelei, Atticus Sappington Kick (Drive: 2 plays, 52 yards, 0:34; Oregon State 14–0)

Fourth quarter

- (13:50) OSU – Silas Bolden 45 Yd Run, Atticus Sappington Kick (Drive: 9 plays, 85 yards, 4:53; Oregon State 21–0)
- (5:05) UTAH – Thomas Yassmin 41 Yd pass from Nate Johnson, Joey Cheek Kick (Drive: 3 plays, 55 yards, 1:13; Oregon State 21–7)

Statistics	Utah	Oregon State
First downs	14	15
Plays–yards	63–198	62–358
Rushes–yards	32–57	36–131
Passing yards	141	227
Passing: comp–att–int	13–31–1	15–26–1
Turnovers	1	1
Time of possession	28:54	31:06

Team	Category	Player	Statistics
Utah	Passing	Nate Johnson	8/23, 101 yards, TD
Utah	Rushing	Jaylon Glover	16 carries, 58 yards
Utah	Receiving	Thomas Yassmin	3 receptions, 59 yards, TD
Oregon State	Passing	DJ Uiagalelei	14/25, 204 yards, TD, INT
Oregon State	Rushing	Damien Martinez	16 carries, 65 yards, TD
Oregon State	Receiving	Silas Bolden	6 receptions, 100 yards, TD

=== At California ===
No. 15 Oregon State Beavers (4-1) at California Golden Bears (3-2) – Game summary

Quarter	1	2	3	4	Total
No. 15 Beavers	7	14	14	17	52
Golden Bears	0	17	15	8	40

at California Memorial Stadium • Berkeley, California

- Date: October 7
- Game time: 7:00 p.m.
- Game attendance: 34,930
- Referee: Mark Duddy
- TV announcers (Pac-12 Network): J.B. Long, Max Browne
- Spread: • Odds to win: •

Game information

First quarter

Second quarter

Third quarter

Fourth quarter

Statistics	Oregon State	California
First downs	24	22
Plays–yards	71–499	65–448
Rushes–yards	43–203	33–241
Passing yards	296	207
Passing: comp–att–int	21–28–0	21–32–1
Turnovers		
Time of possession	37:17	22:43

Team	Category	Player	Statistics
Oregon State	Passing	DJ Uiagalelei	19/25, 275 yards, 5 TD
Oregon State	Rushing	Damien Martinez	17 carries, 89 yards, TD
Oregon State	Receiving	Anthony Gould	7 receptions, 117 yards
California	Passing	Fernando Mendoza	21/32, 207 yards, 2 TD, INT
California	Rushing	Isaiah Ifanse	11 carries, 86 yards, 2 TD
California	Receiving	Taj Davis	7 receptions, 69 yards

=== vs No. 18 UCLA ===
No. 18 UCLA Bruins (4–1) at No. 15 Oregon State Beavers (5–1) – Game summary

Quarter	1	2	3	4	Total
No. 18 Bruins	0	10	7	7	24
No. 15 Beavers	13	10	13	0	36

at Reser Stadium • Corvallis, Oregon

- Date: October 14
- Game time: 5:00 p.m.
- Game weather: Sunny, 62 °F (17 °C)
- Game attendance: 37,600
- Referee: Cravonne Barrett
- TV announcers (FOX): Tim Brando, Spencer Tillman

Game information

First quarter
Second quarter
Third quarter
Fourth quarter

Statistics	UCLA	OSU
First downs	27	18
Plays–Yards	85–453	54–415
Rushes–yards	51–287	28–133
Passing yards	166	282
Passing: Comp–Att–Int	15–34–3	16–26–0
Time of possession	30:15	29:45

Team	Category	Player	Statistics
UCLA	Passing	Dante Moore	14/33, 165 yards, TD, 3 INT
UCLA	Rushing	Carson Steele	22 carries, 110 yards, TD
UCLA	Receiving	Logan Loya	5 receptions, 48 yards, TD
Oregon State	Passing	DJ Uiagalelei	14/24, 266 yards, 2 TD
Oregon State	Rushing	Damien Martinez	15 carries, 90 yards
Oregon State	Receiving	Silas Bolden	5 receptions, 87 yards, TD

=== At Arizona ===
Oregon State Beavers (6–1) vs Arizona Wildcats (4–3) – Game summary

Quarter	1	2	3	4	Total
Beavers	7	3	0	14	24
Wildcats	3	7	3	14	27

at Arizona Stadium • Tucson, Arizona

- Date: October 28
- Game time: 7:30 p.m.
- Game weather: Clear, 74 °F (23 °C)
- Game attendance: 45,023
- TV announcers (ESPN): Brian Custer (play-by-play), Rod Gilmore (analyst), Lauren Sisler (sideline)

Game information

First quarter

- (8:28) OSU – Jack Velling 22-yard pass from DJ Uiagalelei, Atticus Sappington kick (Drive: 12 plays, 75 yards, 6:32; Oregon State 7–0)
- (1:34) ARIZ – Tyler Loop 51-yard field goal (Drive: 14 plays, 41 yards, 6:54; Oregon State 7–3)

Second quarter

- (10:32) ARIZ – Tetairoa McMillan 7-yard pass from Noah Fifita, Tyler Loop kick (Drive: 7 plays, 94 yards, 3:22; Arizona 10–7)
- (5:13) OSU – Atticus Sappington 35-yard field goal (Drive: 9 plays, 61 yards, 5:19; Tied 10–10)

Third quarter

- (11:27) ARIZ – Tyler Loop 25-yard field goal (Drive: 9 plays, 67 yards, 3:33; Arizona 13–10)

Fourth quarter

- (14:47) OSU – Silas Bolden 8-yard run, Atticus Sappington kick (Drive: 9 plays, 80 yards, 4:06; Oregon State 17–13)
- (8:46) ARIZ – Michael Wiley 40-yard pass from Noah Fifita, Tyler Loop kick (Drive: 2 plays, 40 yards, 0:45; Arizona 20–17)
- (2:22) ARIZ – Michael Wiley 3-yard pass from Noah Fifita, Tyler Loop kick (Drive: 10 plays, 55 yards, 5:20; Arizona 27–17)
- (1:38) OSU – Jimmy Valsin III 20-yard pass from DJ Uiagalelei, Atticus Sappington kick (Drive: 4 plays, 75 yards, 0:44; Arizona 27–24)

Statistics	OSU	ARIZ
First downs	23	21
Total yards	407	363
Rushing yards	29–131	30–88
Passing yards	276	275
Passing: Comp–Att–Int	18–33–0	25–32–1
Time of possession	29:14	30:46

Team	Category	Player	Statistics
Oregon State	Passing	DJ Uiagalelei	16/30, 218 yards, 2 TD
Oregon State	Rushing	Damien Martinez	14 carries, 87 yards
Oregon State	Receiving	Jack Velling	5 receptions, 71 yards, TD
Arizona	Passing	Noah Fifita	25/32, 275 yards, 3 TD, INT
Arizona	Rushing	Jonah Coleman	11 carries, 55 yards
Arizona	Receiving	Tetairoa McMillan	8 receptions, 80 yards, TD

=== At Colorado ===
No. 16 Oregon State Beavers (6–2) vs Colorado Buffaloes (4–4) – Game summary

Quarter	1	2	3	4	Total
No. 16 Beavers	7	7	6	6	26
Buffaloes	0	3	2	14	19

at Folsom Field • Boulder, Colorado

- Date: November 4
- Game time: 7:00 p.m.
- Game weather: Sunny, 52 °F (11 °C)
- Game attendance: 52,725
- Referee: Mike McCabe
- TV announcers (ESPN): Dave Flemming (play-by-play), Brock Osweiler (analyst), Kayla Burton (sideline)

Game information

First quarter

- (1:26) OSU – Aidan Chiles 23-yard run, Atticus Sappington kick (Drive: 9 plays, 71 yards, 4:49; Oregon State 7–0)

Second quarter

- (7:35) COL – Alejandro Mata 32-yard field goal (Drive: 4 plays, 5 yards, 1:24; Oregon State 7–3)
- (0:16) OSU – Deshaun Fenwick 20-yard pass from DJ Uiagalelei, (Drive: 1 plays, 20 yards, 0:06; Oregon State 14–3)

Third quarter

- (3:55) OSU – Deshaun Fenwick 1-yard run, Atticus Sappington kick, (Drive: 12 plays, 85 yards, 7:24; Oregon State 20–3)
- (3:55) COL – Kyndrich Breedlove defensive two-point conversion (Oregon State 20–5)

Fourth quarter

- (13:57) OSU – Atticus Sappington 32-yard field goal, (Drive: 8 plays, 66 yards, 4:02; Oregon State 23–5)
- (10:41) COL – Travis Hunter 15-yard pass from Shedeur Sanders, Alejandro Mata kick (Drive: 9 plays, 75 yards, 3:16; Oregon State 23–12)
- (4:47) OSU – Atticus Sappington 41-yard field goal (Drive: 11 plays, 52 yards, 5:54; Oregon State 26–12)
- (1:42) COL – Anthony Hankerson 12-yard pass from Shedeur Sanders, Alejandro Mata kick (Drive: 9 plays, 75 yards, 3:05; Oregon State 26–19)

Statistics	OSU	COL
First downs	25	15
Total yards	418	238
Rushes/yards	46–195	19–7
Passing yards	223	245
Passing: Comp–Att–Int	12–25–0	24–39–0
Time of possession	35:58	24:02

Team	Category	Player	Statistics
Oregon State	Passing	DJ Uiagalelei	12/24, 223 yards, 1 TD
Oregon State	Rushing	Damien Martinez	21 carries, 115 yards
Oregon State	Receiving	Jack Velling	3 receptions, 69 yards
Colorado	Passing	Shedeur Sanders	24/39, 245 yards, 2 TD
Colorado	Rushing	Sy'veon Wilkerson	4 carries, 17 yards
Colorado	Receiving	Travis Hunter	8 receptions, 98 yards, 1 TD

=== vs Stanford ===
Stanford Cardinal (3–6) at No. 12 Oregon State Beavers (7–2) – Game summary

Quarter	1	2	3	4	Total
Cardinal	7	3	7	0	17
No. 12 Beavers	14	20	21	7	62

at Reser Stadium • Corvallis, Oregon

- Date: November 11
- Game time: 2:30 p.m.
- Game weather: 56 °F (13 °C)
- Game attendance: 37,107
- Referee: John Love
- TV announcers (Pac-12 Network): Ted Robinson (play-by-play), Yogi Roth (analyst)

Game information

First quarter

- (9:52) OSU - Damien Martinez 7-yard run, Atticus Sappington kick (Drive: 5 plays, 58 yards, 2:37; OSU 7-0)
- (5:33) OSU - Damien Martinez 59-yard run, Atticus Sappington kick (Drive: 6 plays, 70 yards, 2:20; OSU 14-0)
- (0:23) STAN - Ashton Daniels 7-yard run, Joshua Karty kick (Drive: 3 plays, 35 yards, 1:11; OSU 14-7)

Second quarter

- (13:44) OSU - Damien Martinez 15-yard run, Atticus Sappington kick (Drive: 5 plays, 85 yards, 1:35; OSU 21-7)
- (10:17) OSU - Jermaine Terry II 40-yard pass from DJ Uiagalelei, Atticus Sappington kick (Drive: 2 plays, 53 yards, 0:50; OSU 28-7)
- (3:04) STAN - Joshua Karty 28-yard field goal (Drive: 14 plays, 65 yards, 7:13; OSU 28-10)
- (0:15) OSU - Damien Martinez 5-yard run, extra point missed (Drive: 10 plays, 75 yards, 2:49; OSU 34-10)

Third quarter

- (8:09) OSU - Deshaun Fenwick 13-yard pass from DJ Uiagalelei, Atticus Sappington kick (Drive: 12 plays, 75 yards, 6:51; OSU 41-10)
- (3:48) OSU - Aidan Chiles 1-yard run, Atticus Sappington kick (Drive: 5 plays, 34 yards, 1:52; OSU 48-10)
- (1:43) OSU - Deshaun Fenwick 37-yard run, Atticus Sappington kick (Drive: 3 plays, 58 yards, 1:27; OSU 55-10)
- (1:30) STAN - Elic Ayomanor 75-yard pass from Ashton Daniels, Joshua Karty kick (Drive: 1 play, 75 yards, 0:13; OSU 55-17)

Fourth quarter

- (5:54) OSU - Riley Sharp 28-yard pass from Aidan Chiles, Atticus Sappington kick (Drive: 4 plays, 74 yards, 1:58; OSU 62-17)

Statistics	STAN	OSU
First downs	18	29
Total yards	324	598
Rushes/yards	32/127	40/277
Passing yards	242	321
Passing: Comp–Att–Int	14-32-4	18-28-0
Time of possession	29:13	30:47

Team	Category	Player	Statistics
Stanford	Passing	Ashton Daniels	10/16, 200 yards, TD, 3 INT
Stanford	Rushing	Ashton Daniels	9 carries, 65 yards, TD
Stanford	Receiving	Elic Ayomanor	3 receptions, 122 yards, TD
Oregon State	Passing	DJ Uiagalelei	12/19, 240 yards, 2 TD
Oregon State	Rushing	Damien Martinez	15 rushes, 149 yards, 4 TD
Oregon State	Receiving	Anthony Gould	1 reception, 61 yards

=== vs No. 5 Washington ===
No. 5 Washington Huskies (10–0) vs No. 11 Oregon State Beavers (8–2) – Game summary

Quarter	1	2	3	4	Total
No. 5 Huskies	9	13	0	0	22
No. 11 Beavers	7	3	7	3	20

at Reser Stadium • Corvallis, Oregon

- Date: November 18
- Game time: 4:30 p.m.
- Game weather: Rain, 50 °F (10 °C)
- Game attendance: 38,415
- Referee: Justin Elliott
- TV announcers (ABC): Chris Fowler, Kirk Herbstreit, Holly Rowe

Game information

First quarter

Second quarter

Third quarter

Fourth quarter

Statistics	Washington	Oregon State
First downs		
Plays–yards		
Rushes–yards		
Passing yards		
Passing: comp–att–int		
Turnovers		
Time of possession		

Team	Category	Player	Statistics
Washington	Passing		
Washington	Rushing		
Washington	Receiving		
Oregon State	Passing		
Oregon State	Rushing		
Oregon State	Receiving		

=== At Oregon ===
No. 16 Oregon State Beavers (8–3) vs No. 6 Oregon Ducks (10–1) - Game Summary

Quarter	1	2	3	4	Total
No. 16 Beavers	0	7	0	0	7
No. 6 Ducks	7	14	3	7	31

at Autzen Stadium • Eugene, Oregon

- Date: November 24
- Game time: 5:30 p.m.
- Game weather: Clear, 39 °F (4 °C), W 4 mph
- Game attendance: 59,987
- Referee: Chris Wiggins
- TV announcers (FOX): Jason Benetti (play-by-play) and Brock Huard (analyst)

Game information

First quarter

- (6:19) ORE – Bucky Irving 14-yard pass from Bo Nix, Camden Lewis kick (Drive: 15 plays, 88 yards, 8:41; Oregon 7–0)

Second quarter

- (14:20) ORE – Bo Nix 16-yard run, Camden Lewis kick (Drive: 8 plays, 58 yards, 3:13; Oregon 14–0)
- (0:54) OSU – Silas Bolden 9-yard pass from DJ Uiagalelei, Atticus Sappington kick (Drive: 15 plays, 80 yards, 5:37; Oregon 14–7)
- (0:08) ORE – Troy Franklin 41-yard pass from Bo Nix, Camden Lewis kick (Drive: 5 plays, 78 yards, 0:40; Oregon 21–7)

Third quarter

- (6:01) ORE – Camden Lewis 25-yard field goal (Drive: 8 plays, 64 yards, 3:25; Oregon 24–7)

Fourth quarter

- (14:37) ORE – Jordan James 1-yard run, Camden Lewis kick (Drive: 12 plays, 82 yards, 4:53; Oregon 31–7)

Statistics	OSU	ORE
First downs	17	28
Plays–yards	59–273	68–480
Rushes–yards	24–53	28–113
Passing yards	220	367
Passing: comp–att–int	19–35–1	33–40–0
Turnovers		
Time of possession	25:57	34:03

Team	Category	Player	Statistics
Oregon State	Passing	DJ Uiagalelei	19/35, 220 yards, TD, INT
Oregon State	Rushing	Damien Martinez	13 carries, 38 yards
Oregon State	Receiving	Anthony Gould	6 receptions, 85 yards
Oregon	Passing	Bo Nix	33/40, 367 yards, 2 TD
Oregon	Rushing	Jordan James	7 carries, 43 yards, TD
Oregon	Receiving	Tez Johnson	11 receptions, 137 yards

=== vs No. 16 Notre Dame (Sun Bowl) ===
2023 Tony the Tiger Sun Bowl
No. 19 Oregon State Beavers (8-4, 5-4) vs No. 16 Notre Dame Fighting Irish (9-3) – Game summary

Quarter	1	2	3	4	Total
No. 19 Beavers	0	0	0	8	8
No. 16 Fighting Irish	7	7	10	16	40

at Sun Bowl • El Paso, Texas

- Date: Friday, December 29th, 2023
- Game time: 1:00 pm EST/12:00 pm CST/11:00 am PST
- Game weather: Sunny, 50 °F (10 °C)
- Game attendance: 48,223
- Referee: Scott Walker
- TV announcers (CBS): Brad Nessler (Play-by-Play), Gary Danielson (Color Commentator), and Jenny Dell (Sideline Reporter)

Game information

First quarter

- (6:47) ND – Jayden Thomas 8 yard pass from Steve Angeli, Spencer Shrader kick (Drive: 11 plays, 96 yards, 6:09; Notre Dame 7–0)

Second quarter

- (0:27) ND – Jadarian Price 1 yard run, Spencer Shrader kick (Drive: 7 plays, 44 yards, 3:02; Notre Dame 14–0)

Third quarter

- (9:43) ND – Spencer Shrader 44 yard field goal (Drive: 8 plays, 49 yards, 5:17; Notre Dame 17–0)
- (3:28) ND – Jordan Faison 13 yard pass from Steve Angeli, Spencer Shrader kick (Drive: 8 plays, 60 yards, 4:53; Notre Dame 24–0)

Fourth quarter

- (10:55) ND – Team Safety (Drive: 1 plays, -1 yards, 0:29; Notre Dame 26–0)
- (9:08) ND – Jeremiyah Love 13 yard pass from Steve Angeli, Spencer Shrader kick (Drive: 3 plays, 72 yards, 1:47; Notre Dame 33–0)
- (6:02) OSU – Jimmy Valsin III 33 yard pass from Ben Gulbranson, Tyler Voltin run (Drive: 6 plays, 71 yards, 3:06; Notre Dame 33–8)
- (2:45) ND – Chase Ketterer 6 yard run, Spencer Shrader kick (Drive: 6 plays, 40 yards, 3:17; Notre Dame 40–8)

Statistics	No. 19 Oregon State	No. 16 Notre Dame
First downs	10	24
Plays–yards	44–197	67–468
Rushes–yards	16–2	48–236
Passing yards	195	232
Passing: comp–att–int	17–28–1	15–19–0
Turnovers		
Time of possession	20:06	39:54

Team	Category	Player	Statistics
No. 19 Oregon State	Passing	Ben Gulbranson	16/27, 180 yards, TD, INT
No. 19 Oregon State	Rushing	Deshaun Fenwick	6 carries, 15 yards
No. 19 Oregon State	Receiving	Jesiah Irish	3 receptions, 56 yards
No. 16 Notre Dame	Passing	Steve Angeli	15/19, 232 yards, 3 TD
No. 16 Notre Dame	Rushing	Jadarian Price	13 carries, 106 yards, TD
No. 16 Notre Dame	Receiving	Jordan Faison	5 receptions, 115 yards, TD

== Rankings ==
Ranking movements Legend: ██ Increase in ranking ██ Decrease in ranking RV = Received votes т = Tied with team above or below
	Week															
Poll	Pre	1	2	3	4	5	6	7	8	9	10	11	12	13	14	Final
AP	18	16	16	14	19	15	15	12	11	16	12	10	15	21т	21	RV
Coaches	18	18	17	15	21	16	14	13	12	19	13	10	15	21	22	RV
CFP	Not released									16	12	11	16	20	19	Not released
