= 1897 Nevada State Sagebrushers football team =

American college football season

1897 Nevada State Sagebrushers football
- Conference: Independent
- Record: 0–1
- Head coach: William H. Harrelson (1st season)
- Home stadium: Evans Field

1897 Far West college football independents records
	Conf.			Overall
Team	W	L	T	W		L		T
Oregon Agricultural		–		5	–	0	–	0
Washington Agricultural		–		2	–	0	–	0
Wyoming		–		2	–	0	–	0
USC		–		5	–	1	–	0
Stanford		–		4	–	1	–	0
New Mexico A&M		–		1	–	0	–	1
Oregon		–		1	–	1	–	0
Montana		–		1	–	2	–	3
Washington		–		1	–	2	–	0
Montana Agricultural		–		1	–	3	–	0
California		–		0	–	3	–	2
Utah		–		1	–	5	–	0
Arizona Normal		–		0	–	1	–	0
Idaho		–		0	–	1	–	0
Nevada State		–		0	–	1	–	0

The 1897 Nevada State Sagebrushers football team was an American football team that represented Nevada State University (now known as the University of Nevada, Reno) as an independent during the 1897 college football season. The Sagebrushers were led by William H. Harrelson in his first and only year as head coach.

== Schedule ==
Date	Opponent	Site	Result
November 27	California B (JV) Team	Evans Field; Reno, NV	L 6–20
