= 1897 Stanford football team =

American college football season

1897 Stanford football
- Conference: Independent
- Record: 4–1
- Head coach: George H. Brooke (1st season)

1897 Far West college football independents records
	Conf.			Overall
Team	W	L	T	W		L		T
Oregon Agricultural		–		5	–	0	–	0
Washington Agricultural		–		2	–	0	–	0
Wyoming		–		2	–	0	–	0
USC		–		5	–	1	–	0
Stanford		–		4	–	1	–	0
New Mexico A&M		–		1	–	0	–	1
Oregon		–		1	–	1	–	0
Montana		–		1	–	2	–	3
Washington		–		1	–	2	–	0
Montana Agricultural		–		1	–	3	–	0
California		–		0	–	3	–	2
Utah		–		1	–	5	–	0
Arizona Normal		–		0	–	1	–	0
Idaho		–		0	–	1	–	0
Nevada State		–		0	–	1	–	0

The 1897 Stanford football team represented Stanford University in the 1897 college football season and was coached by George H. Brooke in his only year coaching the team. The team played the Reliance Athletic Club team four times and ended the season with its annual Thanksgiving Day game against California, winning 28–0, the biggest margin of victory yet in the seven-year Big Game series. At this point in the series, Stanford had won 4 and tied 3 with no losses.

== Schedule ==
Date	Opponent	Site	Result
October 9	vs. Reliance Athletic Club	Recreation Park; San Francisco, CA	W 6–4
October 23	vs. Reliance Athletic Club	Recreation Park; San Francisco, CA	W 8–6
October 30	vs. Reliance Athletic Club	Cyclers' Park; San Jose, CA	W 12–6
November 13	vs. Reliance Athletic Club	Recreation Park; San Francisco, CA	L 0–10
November 25	vs. California	Recreation Park; San Francisco, CA (rivalry)	W 28–0
