= 1897 Washington Agricultural football team =

American college football season

1897 Washington Agricultural football
- Conference: Independent
- Record: 2–0
- Head coach: Robert Gailey (1st season)
- Captain: Joe Winston
- Home stadium: Soldier Field

1897 Far West college football independents records
	Conf.			Overall
Team	W	L	T	W		L		T
Oregon Agricultural		–		5	–	0	–	0
Washington Agricultural		–		2	–	0	–	0
Wyoming		–		2	–	0	–	0
USC		–		5	–	1	–	0
Stanford		–		4	–	1	–	0
New Mexico A&M		–		1	–	0	–	1
Oregon		–		1	–	1	–	0
Montana		–		1	–	2	–	3
Washington		–		1	–	2	–	0
Montana Agricultural		–		1	–	3	–	0
California		–		0	–	3	–	2
Utah		–		1	–	5	–	0
Arizona Normal		–		0	–	1	–	0
Idaho		–		0	–	1	–	0
Nevada State		–		0	–	1	–	0

The 1897 Washington Agricultural football team was an American football team that represented Washington Agricultural College during the 1897 college football season. The team competed as an independent under head coach Robert Gailey and compiled a record of 2–0.

== Schedule ==
Date	Opponent	Site	Result
November 13	at Spokane AC	Spokane, WA	W 16–8
November 25	at Whitman	Walla Walla, WA	W 16–4
