= 1897 USC Methodists football team =

American college football season

1897 USC Methodists football
- Conference: Independent
- Record: 5–1
- Head coach: Lewis R. Freeman (1st season)
- Captain: Harry Martin

1897 Far West college football independents records
	Conf.			Overall
Team	W	L	T	W		L		T
Oregon Agricultural		–		5	–	0	–	0
Washington Agricultural		–		2	–	0	–	0
Wyoming		–		2	–	0	–	0
USC		–		5	–	1	–	0
Stanford		–		4	–	1	–	0
New Mexico A&M		–		1	–	0	–	1
Oregon		–		1	–	1	–	0
Montana		–		1	–	2	–	3
Washington		–		1	–	2	–	0
Montana Agricultural		–		1	–	3	–	0
California		–		0	–	3	–	2
Utah		–		1	–	5	–	0
Arizona Normal		–		0	–	1	–	0
Idaho		–		0	–	1	–	0
Nevada State		–		0	–	1	–	0

The 1897 USC Methodists football team was an American football team that represented the University of Southern California during the 1897 college football season. The team competed as an independent under head coach Lewis R. Freeman, compiling a 5–1 record.

== Schedule ==
Date	Opponent	Site	Result	Attendance
	St. Vincent's (CA)	Los Angeles, CA	W 34–0	
November 6	vs. Los Angeles High School	Fiesta Park; Los Angeles, CA	W 10–0	500
November 13	vs. Chaffey	Fiesta Park; Los Angeles, CA	W 38–0	250
November 25	at Pomona	Claremont, CA	W 6–0	
December 25	at San Diego YMCA	San Diego, CA	L 0–18	
January 1	at Ventura	Ventura, CA	W 12–0	
