= Oregon State Beavers football =

Football team of Oregon State University

| 2026 Oregon State Beavers football team |
- First season: 1893; 133 years ago
- Athletic director: Kevin Griffin
- General manager: Eron Hodges
- Head coach: JaMarcus Shephard; 1st season, 5–3 (.625)
- Location: Corvallis, Oregon
- Stadium: Reser Stadium (capacity: 40,000)
- NCAA division: Division I FBS
- Conference: Pac-12; Independent (1898–1901, 1903–1907, 1959–1963); NIAA (c. 1902); Northwest (1908–1925); PCC (1916–1942, 1945–1958)
- Colors: Orange and black
- All-time record: 571–634–50 (.475)
- Bowl record: 12–8 (.600)

Conference championships
- OIFA: 1893, 1897 Northwest: 1925 PCC: 1941, 1956, 1957 Pac-12: 1964, 2000
- Heisman winners: Terry Baker – 1962
- Consensus All-Americans: 8
- Rivalries: Oregon (rivalry) Washington State (rivalry); Northwest Championship

Uniforms
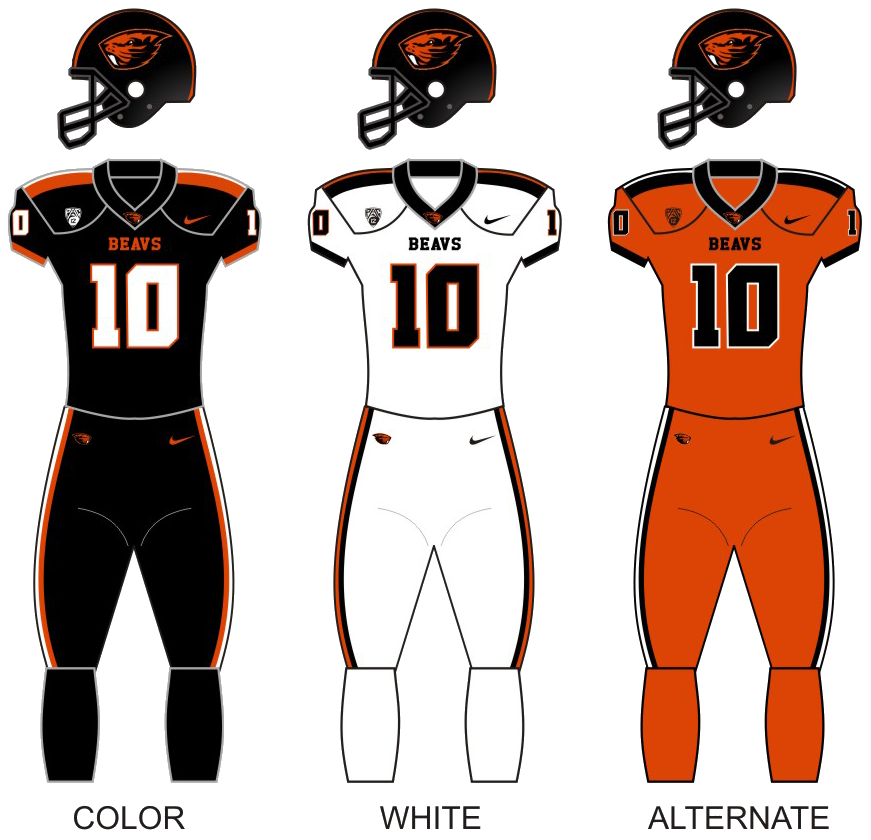
- Fight song: Hail to Old OSU
- Mascot: Benny Beaver
- Marching band: Oregon State University Marching Band
- Outfitter: Nike
- Website: OSUBeavers.com

The Oregon State Beavers football team represents Oregon State University in NCAA Division I FBS college football. The team first fielded an organized football team in 1893 and has been a member of the Pac-12 Conference and prior iterations since the conference's founding in 1915. Their home games are played at Reser Stadium in Corvallis, Oregon. The mascot of the beavers is also the official state animal and nickname for the state of Oregon. Team colors are orange and black. The school has one Heisman Trophy winner with Terry Baker in 1962 and has a total of five conference championships. OSU's main rival has been the University of Oregon in what traditionally has been named the Civil War, first played in 1894.

== Early history ==
Football at Oregon State University started in 1893 shortly after athletics were initially authorized at the college, which was then known as Oregon Agricultural College. Athletics were banned prior to May 1892, but when the school's president Benjamin Arnold died, his successor John Bloss reversed the ban. Bloss' son, William, started the first team, on which he served as both coach and quarterback. The team's first game was an easy 64–0 victory on November 11, 1893, over visiting Albany College.

When the team first started, they played their first games on an open grass lot with a perimeter fence. In 1896 or 1897, bleachers were built for the south side, which was designated the home side, and in 1899–1901, bleachers were built for the visitors on the north side. It was first known as College Field on Lower Campus. The first game was played on November 11, 1893, at College Field on Lower Campus against Albany College. Over 500 spectators, who paid a ten-cent admission, cheered on OSU for a 62–0 victory. Brady F. Burnett scored the first touchdown in Oregon State history on a fumble return.

In 1906, Oregon State hired Fred Norcross as its head football coach. Norcross had played quarterback for Fielding H. Yost's "Point a Minute" Michigan Wolverines from 1903 to 1905. Through the first six games of the 1906 season, the college had compiled a 4–0–2 record, outscoring opponents, 77–0. In the final game of the season, Willamette defeated Oregon State, kicking a 23-yard field goal midway through the first half, the only points either team scored. Despite the result, Oregon State students marched through the streets of Salem, Oregon, chanting the early OSU fight songs.

== Conference affiliations ==
The university has been in several athletic conferences. Prior to joining the Pac-12 Conference (then called the Pacific-8 Conference), OSU intermittently played as an independent school.

- Oregon Intercollegiate Football Association (1893–1897)
- Independent (1898–1901, 1903–1907)
- Northwest Intercollegiate Athletic Association (c. 1902)
- Northwest Conference (1908–1925)
- Pacific Coast Conference (1915–1958)
- Independent (1959–1963)
- Pac-12 Conference (1964–present)

== Conference championships ==
The Aggies won the Northwest Conference co-championship in 1925; the team finished tied for third in the Pacific Coast Conference.

Oregon State has won eight conference championships, done through five different conferences, although two of them have links to the current Pac-12 Conference, as the conference claims the history of the PCC as their own, and the Athletic Association of Western Universities was the first name for the conference that later became the Pac-12 Conference.

| Year | Conference | Coach | Overall record | Conference record |
|---|---|---|---|---|
| 1893 | Oregon Intercollegiate Football Association | Will Bloss | 5–1 | 3–0 |
| 1897 | Oregon Intercollegiate Football Association | Will Bloss | 6–0 | 3–0 |
| 1925† | Northwest Conference | Paul J. Schissler | 7–2 | 7–0 |
| 1941 | Pacific Coast Conference | Lon Stiner | 8–2 | 7–2 |
| 1956 | Pacific Coast Conference | Tommy Prothro | 7–3–1 | 6–1–1 |
| 1957† | Pacific Coast Conference | Tommy Prothro | 8–2 | 6–2 |
| 1964† | Athletic Association of Western Universities | Tommy Prothro | 8–3 | 3–1 |
| 2000† | Pacific-10 Conference | Dennis Erickson | 11–1 | 7–1 |

† Co-championship

== Other claimed championships ==
1897 Champions of the Northwest

The 1897 Oregon Agricultural Aggies football team compiled a perfect 5–0 record, shut out four of five opponents, and outscored their opponents by a combined total of 164–8. The team claimed their second league championship in the OIFA.

The Aggies defeated Oregon (26–8) and Washington (16–0). With those two wins, they then proclaimed themselves regional "Champions of the Northwest".

1907 Champions of the Pacific (West Coast)

1907 Champions of the Northwest

The 1907 Oregon Agricultural Aggies football team represented Oregon Agricultural College as an independent during the 1907 college football season. In their second season under head coach Fred Norcross, the Aggies compiled a perfect 6–0 record, did not allow any of their opponents to score, and outscored their opponents by a combined total of 137–0. The Aggies' victories included games against Oregon (4–0), Pacific University (49–0), and Willamette University (42–0).

Oregon Agricultural's game against Loyola, then known as the St. Vincent's College Saints, was a Thanksgiving Day matchup of the "Champions of the Northwest" and the "Champions of California", with the winner taking home the "Championship" of the entire West Coast. After their victory, the Aggies proclaimed themselves "Champions of the Pacific Coast".

== Head coaches ==
List of head coaches, tenure, and number of seasons.

- Will Bloss (1893, 1897) 1, 1
- Guy Kennedy (1894) 1
- Paul Downing (1895) 1
- Tommy Code (1896) 1
- No coach (1898)
- Hiland Orlando Stickney (1899) 1
- No team (1900–1901)
- Fred Herbold (1902) 1
- Thomas L. McFadden (1903) 1
- Allen Steckle (1904–1905) 2
- Fred Norcross (1906–1908) 3
- Sol Metzger (1909) 1
- George Schildmiller (1910) 1
- Sam Dolan (1911–1912) 2
- E. J. Stewart (1913–1915) 3
- Joseph Pipal (1916–1917) 2
- Homer Woodson Hargiss (1918–1919) 2
- Dick Rutherford (1920–1923) 4
- Paul J. Schissler (1924–1932) 9
- Lon Stiner (1933–1942) 10
- No team (1943–1944)
- Lon Stiner (1945–1948) 4
- Kip Taylor (1949–1954) 6
- Tommy Prothro (1955–1964) 10
- Dee Andros (1965–1975) 11
- Craig Fertig (1976–1979) 4
- Joe Avezzano (1980–1984) 5
- Dave Kragthorpe (1985–1990) 6
- Jerry Pettibone (1991–1996) 6
- Mike Riley (1997–1998, 2003–2014) 2, 12
- Dennis Erickson (1999–2002) 4
- Gary Andersen (2015–2017) 3
- Cory Hall (2017) 1
- Jonathan Smith (2018–2023) 6
- Kefense Hynson (2023) 1
- Trent Bray (2024–2025) 2
- JaMarcus Shephard (current)

== Bowl games ==
Oregon State University has played in 20 postseason bowl games. The Beavers have also played in the Mirage Bowl, but this was a regular season game and a "bowl" in name only, not a post-season invitational bowl game. The Beavers lost the 1980 edition of the game against No. 14 ranked UCLA 34–3 in front of 80,000 at National Olympic Stadium in Tokyo, Japan.

The 20 bowl game total does not include an invitation to play in the Gotham Bowl in 1960, when no opponent could be found for Oregon State. The Beavers are 12–8 in bowl game appearances.

| Year | Coach | Bowl | Opponent | Result |
|---|---|---|---|---|
| 1939 | Lon Stiner | Pineapple Bowl | Hawaii | W 39–6 |
| 1941 | Lon Stiner | Rose Bowl | Duke | W 20–16 |
| 1948 | Lon Stiner | Pineapple Bowl | Hawaii | W 47–27 |
| 1956 | Tommy Prothro | Rose Bowl | Iowa | L 19–35 |
| 1960 | Tommy Prothro | Gotham Bowl | None Found | |
| 1962 | Tommy Prothro | Liberty Bowl | Villanova | W 6–0 |
| 1964 | Tommy Prothro | Rose Bowl | Michigan | L 7–34 |
| 1980 | Joe Avezzano | Mirage Bowl | UCLA | L 3–34 |
| 1999 | Dennis Erickson | Oahu Bowl | Hawaii | L 17–23 |
| 2000 | Dennis Erickson | Fiesta Bowl | Notre Dame | W 41–9 |
| 2002 | Dennis Erickson | Insight Bowl | Pittsburgh | L 13–38 |
| 2003 | Mike Riley | Las Vegas Bowl | New Mexico | W 55–14 |
| 2004 | Mike Riley | Insight Bowl | Notre Dame | W 38–21 |
| 2006 | Mike Riley | Sun Bowl | Missouri | W 39–38 |
| 2007 | Mike Riley | Emerald Bowl | Maryland | W 21–14 |
| 2008 | Mike Riley | Sun Bowl | Pittsburgh | W 3–0 |
| 2009 | Mike Riley | Las Vegas Bowl | BYU | L 20–44 |
| 2012 | Mike Riley | Alamo Bowl | Texas | L 27–31 |
| 2013 | Mike Riley | Hawaii Bowl | Boise State | W 38–23 |
| 2021 | Jonathan Smith | LA Bowl | Utah State | L 13–24 |
| 2022 | Jonathan Smith | Las Vegas Bowl | Florida | W 30–3 |
| 2023 | Kefense Hynson | Sun Bowl | Notre Dame | L 8–40 |

== Home stadium ==
The Beavers play their home games at Reser Stadium in Corvallis, Oregon. It was originally called Parker Stadium when it was constructed in 1953, and had a capacity of 25,000. Parker Stadium was renamed Reser Stadium in June 1999. Major renovations from 2005 to 2016 increased the stadium's capacity to 43,363, where it stood through the 2021 season. Another renovation project, called "Completing Reser", was announced on Feb. 4, 2021. The stadium featured a temporary capacity of 26,000 during the 2022 season and now has an official capacity of 35,548 at the completion of the construction project for the 2023 season.

== Rivalries ==
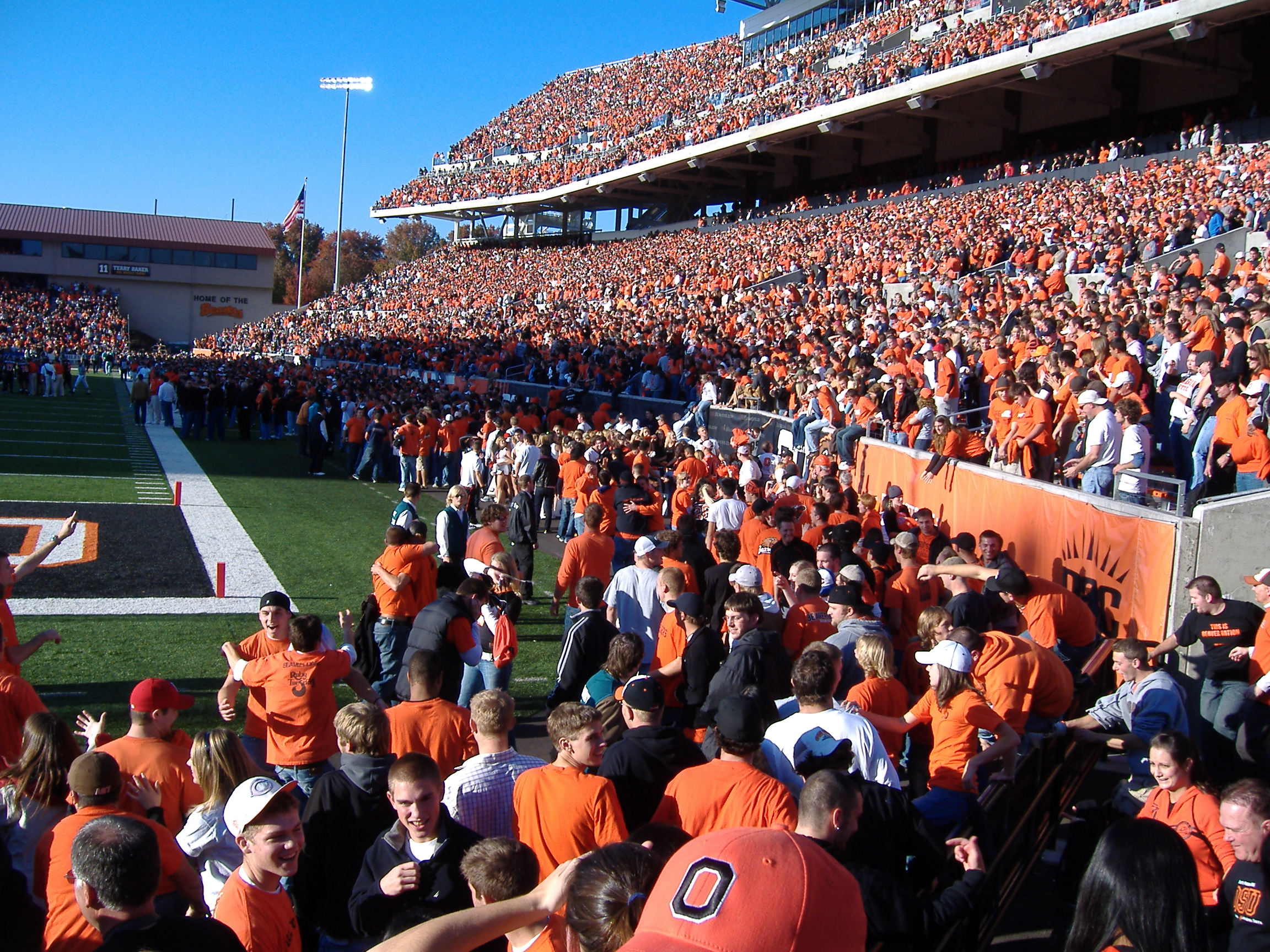
Oregon State fans prepare to rush the field near the end of an upset of No. 3 USC in 2006

=== Oregon ===
Oregon State University's primary rival is the University of Oregon. The two schools enjoy a fierce and long-standing rivalry due to the proximity of the two campuses. The University of Oregon is in Eugene, Oregon, about 40 miles (64 km) south of Corvallis.

The teams first matched up on the gridiron in 1894 and have been playing each other almost every year since. The rivalry game between the two schools has traditionally been the last game of each season and was long known as the "Civil War Game." The two schools have played each other 128 times, tied for fifth most among any Division I FBS rivalry. Though not officially recognized by the universities, the Platypus Trophy is awarded annually to the winning alumni association. Oregon leads the series 69–49–10 through the end of the 2024 season.

=== Washington State ===
The rivalry with Washington State started in 1895 when Cougars defeated the Beavers 41–35. It is among the most played FBS rivalries in history. The two rivals have meet 110 times as of 2025 and will play each other twice with a home-and-home series in 2025. Washington State leads the series 57–50–3 through the middle of the 2025 season.

The Beavers' largest margin of victory was 66–13 in 2008, while the Cougars' largest margin of victory was 55–7 in 1991. Oregon State's longest win streak against the Cougars is six straight from 1966 to 1971, while Washington State's longest against the Beavers is 10 straight from 1983 to 1993. The rivalry has not been officially named yet, with suggestions including the "Land-Grant Rivalry", the "Cascade Cup", and the "Columbia River Rivalry".

=== Northwest Championship ===
The Northwest Championship is a rivalry between Oregon, Oregon State, Washington, and Washington State. The four Pacific Northwest rivals began playing in a round-robin format in the 1903 season. No trophy is awarded to the winner, and no organization grants the title, although in 2002, the Washington Huskies wore homemade t-shirts for the Northwest Championship.

== Retired numbers ==
Oregon State Beavers retired numbers
| No. | Player | Pos. | Tenure | Ref. |
|---|---|---|---|---|
| 11 | Terry Baker | QB | 1959–1962 | |

Although not a retired number Oregon State has "AL" displayed opposite Terry Baker's number "11" in Reser Stadium for long time donor/philanthropist/contributor Al Reser.

== Individual national award winners ==
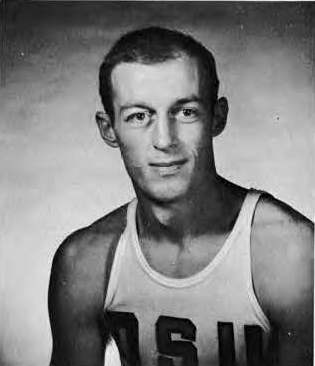
QB Terry Baker, 1962 Heisman Trophy winner

Players

- Heisman Trophy

Terry Baker (1962)

- Maxwell Award

Terry Baker (1962)

- Groza Award

Alexis Serna (2005)

- Biletnikoff Trophy

Mike Hass (2005)
Brandin Cooks (2013)

- Chic Harley Award

Terry Baker (1962)

- Paul Hornung Award

Jack Colletto (2022)

- National Football Foundation Scholar-Athlete of the Year Award

Mike Kline (1961)
Terry Baker (1962)

- UPI College Football Player of the Year

Terry Baker (1962)

- Sports Illustrated Sportsperson of the Year

Terry Baker (1962)

- Sporting News College Football Player of the Year

Terry Baker (1962)

- College Football Network Punt Returner of the Year

Anthony Gould (2022)

- Silver Anniversary Awards

Terry Baker (1988)
Pellom McDaniels (2015)

- NCAA Inspiration Award

Esera Tuaolo (2024)

Coaches

- Sporting News Coach of the Year

Dennis Erickson (2000)

- AFCA Region 5 Coach of the Year

Mike Riley (2008)
Mike Riley (2012)
Jonathan Smith (2022)

- Amos Alonzo Stagg Award

John Cooper (2016)

== Individual conference awards ==
- Pac-12 Offensive Player of the Year

Jacquizz Rodgers (2008)

- Pac-12 Defensive Player of the Year

Bill Swancutt (2004†)
Stephen Paea (2010)

- Pac-12 Freshman Player of the Year

Brandon Browner (2003)
Jeremy Perry (2005†)
Jacquizz Rodgers (2008)
Jermar Jefferson (2018)
Damien Martinez (2022)

- Pac-12 Coach of the Year

Dave Kragthorpe (1989)
Dennis Erickson (2000)
Mike Riley (2008)
Jonathan Smith (2022†)

- Pop Warner Trophy

Joe Francis (1957)
Terry Baker (1962)
Vern Burke (1963)
Pete Pifer (1966)

- W. J. Voit Memorial Trophy

Terry Baker (1962)
Vern Burke (1963)
Pete Pifer (1966)

- Morris Trophy

Esera Tuaolo (1989)
Inoke Breckterfield (1998)
Bill Swancutt (2004)
Stephen Paea (2008, 2009)

†Shared Award

== All-Americans ==
Oregon State has had 53 first team All-Americans in the history of the program as of the end of the 2023 season, with 8 Consensus All-Americans and 2 Unanimous All-Americans.

- 1916 Herman Abraham – HB
- 1921 George "Gap" Powell – FB
- 1928 Howard Maple – QB
- 1933 Red Franklin – HB
- 1933 Ade Schwammel – T
- 1939 Eberle Schultz – OG
- 1940 Vic Sears – T
- 1941 Quentin Greenough – C
- 1946 Bill Gray – C
- 1955 John Witte – T
- 1956 John Witte – T †
- 1958 Ted Bates – OT †
- 1962 Terry Baker – QB ‡
- 1963 Vern Burke – SE †
- 1964 Jack O'Billovich – LB
- 1964 Rich Koeper – OT
- 1967 Jess Lewis – DT
- 1967 Jon Sandstrom – G
- 1967 John Didion – C
- 1968 John Didion – C ‡
- 1968 Bill Enyart – FB
- 1970 Craig Hanneman – DT
- 1972 Steve Brown – LB
- 1979 Steve Coury – SE
- 1992 Fletcher Keister – OG
- 1998 Inoke Breckterfield – DE
- 2000 Ken Simonton – TB
- 2000 DeLawrence Grant – DE
- 2000 Chris Gibson – C
- 2000 Richard Seigler – LB
- 2001 Dennis Weathersby – CB
- 2001 Mitch Meeuwsen – S
- 2002 Dennis Weathersby – CB
- 2002 Steven Jackson – TB
- 2003 Steven Jackson – TB
- 2003 Brandon Browner – CB
- 2004 Mitch Meeuwsen – FS
- 2004 Mike Hass – WR
- 2005 Mike Hass – WR
- 2005 Alexis Serna – PK
- 2005 Jeremy Perry – OT
- 2006 Sammie Stroughter – PR
- 2007 Roy Schuening – OG
- 2008 Andy Levitre – OT
- 2009 Jacquizz Rodgers – RB
- 2009 James Rodgers – WR
- 2010 Stephen Paea – DT †
- 2012 Jordan Poyer – CB †
- 2013 Brandin Cooks – WR †
- 2019 Hamilcar Rashed Jr. – LB
- 2022 Anthony Gould – PR
- 2022 Brandon Kipper – G
- 2023 Taliese Fuaga – OT

† Consensus Selection, ‡ Unanimous Selection

== College Football Hall of Fame inductees ==
The Beavers have had three players and three coaches inducted into the College Football Hall of Fame.

| Year inducted | Player/Coach | POS | Seasons at Oregon St. |
|---|---|---|---|
| 1982 | Terry Baker | QB | 1960–1962 |
| 1991 | Tommy Prothro | Coach | 1955–1964 |
| 2008 | John Cooper | Assistant Coach | 1963–1964 |
| 2011 | Bill Enyart | FB | 1967–1968 |
| 2019 | Dennis Erickson | Coach | 1999–2002 |
| 2022 | Mike Hass | WR | 2002–2005 |

== Beavers in the NFL ==
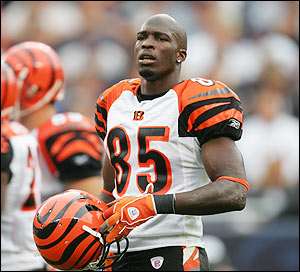
Chad Johnson, inducted into Cincinnati Bengals Ring of Honor

First round draft picks

| Name | Position | Year | Overall pick | Team |
|---|---|---|---|---|
| Joe Gray | FB | 1938 | 10 | Chicago Bears |
| Ken Carpenter | FB | 1950 | 13 | Cleveland Browns |
| Terry Baker | QB | 1963 | 1 | Los Angeles Rams |
| Nick Barnett | LB | 2003 | 29 | Green Bay Packers |
| Steven Jackson | RB | 2004 | 24 | St. Louis Rams |
| Brandin Cooks | WR | 2014 | 20 | New Orleans Saints |
| Taliese Fuaga | OT | 2024 | 14 | New Orleans Saints |

=== Active NFL ===
Updated April 2026.

- Teagan Quitoriano, Arizona Cardinals
- Isaac Seumalo, Arizona Cardinals
- Gerad Christian-Lichtenhan, Baltimore Ravens
- Joshua Gray, Carolina Panthers
- Skyler Thomas, Chicago Bears
- Jaden Robinson, Denver Broncos
- Luke Musgrave, Green Bay Packers
- Kitan Oladapo, Green Bay Packers
- Anthony Gould, Indianapolis Colts
- Alex Austin, Miami Dolphins
- Blake Brandel, Minnesota Vikings
- Johnny Hekker, Minnesota Vikings
- Taliese Fuaga, New Orleans Saints
- Rejzohn Wright, New Orleans Saints
- Isaiah Hodgins, New York Giants
- Nahshon Wright, New York Jets

== Media ==
- Radio flagship: KEX 1190 AM in Portland
- Broadcasters: Mike Parker (play-by-play), Jim Wilson (analyst), and Ron Callan (sideline reporter).
- Oregon State also has an extensive network of broadcast affiliates.

== Future non-conference opponents ==
Announced schedules as of September 11, 2026.

| 2026 | 2027 | 2028 | 2029 | 2030 | 2031 | 2032 |
|---|---|---|---|---|---|---|
| at Houston | at BYU | vs BYU^{1} | Sacramento State | Ole Miss | at Oregon | Oregon |
| Texas Tech | Portland State | Idaho | San Jose State | at San Jose State | at Sam Houston | Tulsa |
| Montana | New Mexico | Oregon | at Oregon | at Kansas State | Kansas State | Appalachian State |
| at UTEP | at Ole Miss | at New Mexico | at Wake Forest | UTEP | | Idaho |

1. Vegas Kickoff Classic, Las Vegas, Nevada
