= 1897 University of Utah football team =

American college football season

1897 University of Utah football
- Conference: Independent
- Record: 1–5
- Head coach: Byron Cummings (1st season)
- Home stadium: University campus

1897 Far West college football independents records
	Conf.			Overall
Team	W	L	T	W		L		T
Oregon Agricultural		–		5	–	0	–	0
Washington Agricultural		–		2	–	0	–	0
Wyoming		–		2	–	0	–	0
USC		–		5	–	1	–	0
Stanford		–		4	–	1	–	0
New Mexico A&M		–		1	–	0	–	1
Oregon		–		1	–	1	–	0
Montana		–		1	–	2	–	3
Washington		–		1	–	2	–	0
Montana Agricultural		–		1	–	3	–	0
California		–		0	–	3	–	2
Utah		–		1	–	5	–	0
Arizona Normal		–		0	–	1	–	0
Idaho		–		0	–	1	–	0
Nevada State		–		0	–	1	–	0

The 1897 University of Utah football team was an American football team that represented the University of Utah as an independent during the 1897 college football season. Head coach Byron Cummings led the team to a 1–5 record.

== Schedule ==
Date	Time	Opponent	Site	Result	Attendance	Source
October 23	4:00 p.m.	Salt Lake City YMCA	University campus; Salt Lake City, UT	L 0–8	500	
November 1		Latter Day Saints College	University campus; Salt Lake City, UT	W 8–0		
November 5		Collegiate Institute	University campus; Salt Lake City, UT	L 4–6		
November 25	1:30 p.m.	Salt Lake City YMCA	University campus; Salt Lake City, UT	L 0–16	1,200	
December 4	2:00 p.m.	Brigham Young Academy	University campus; Salt Lake City, UT (Holy War)	L 0–14		
December 18	2:45 p.m.	at Brigham Young Academy	Provo, UT	L 0–22		
