= 1897 Oregon Agricultural Aggies football team =

American college football season

1897 Oregon Agricultural Aggies football

OIFA champion Champion of the Northwest
- Conference: Oregon Intercollegiate Football Association
- Record: 5–0 (0–0 OIFA)
- Head coach: Will Bloss (2nd season)
- Captain: Daniel Bodine
- Home stadium: OAC Field

1897 Far West college football independents records
	Conf.			Overall
Team	W	L	T	W		L		T
Oregon Agricultural		–		5	–	0	–	0
Washington Agricultural		–		2	–	0	–	0
Wyoming		–		2	–	0	–	0
USC		–		5	–	1	–	0
Stanford		–		4	–	1	–	0
New Mexico A&M		–		1	–	0	–	1
Oregon		–		1	–	1	–	0
Montana		–		1	–	2	–	3
Washington		–		1	–	2	–	0
Montana Agricultural		–		1	–	3	–	0
California		–		0	–	3	–	2
Utah		–		1	–	5	–	0
Arizona Normal		–		0	–	1	–	0
Idaho		–		0	–	1	–	0
Nevada State		–		0	–	1	–	0

The 1897 Oregon Agricultural Aggies football team represented Oregon Agricultural College (OAC)—now known as Oregon State University—during the 1897 college football season. In their second, non-consecutive year under head coach Will Bloss, the Aggies compiled a perfect 5–0 record, shut out four of five opponents, and outscored their opponents 152 to 8. Oregon Agricultural claimed its second Oregon Intercollegiate Football Association (OIFA) title. Daniel Bodine was the team captain.

The Aggies defeated Oregon (26–8) and Washington (16–0), with Pacific University scheduled to play on Thanksgiving Day but forfeiting. Having outscored their opponents 152–8 for the year, the Agrics were thus proclaimed "Champions of the Northwest" for 1897.

== Schedule ==
Date	Time	Opponent	Site	Result	Attendance	Source
October 23		Albany College (OR)	OAC Field; Corvallis, OR	W 34–0	"large crowd"	
October 30		Chemawa	OAC Field; Corvallis, OR	W 24–0	1,000	
November 20	3:40 p.m.	at Oregon	Kincaid Field; Eugene, OR (rivalry)	W 24–8	"not large"	
November 25		Pacific (OR)	OAC Field; Corvallis, OR	forfeit		
November 25		McMinnville	OAC Field; Corvallis, OR	W 54–0	800	
December 4	2:30 p.m.	Washington	OAC Field; Corvallis, OR	W 16–0	1,500	

== Background ==
Oregon Agricultural College counted fewer than 350 registered students in its ranks for the 1897–98 academic year, including post-graduates and special students taking courses at the school.

The school charged no tuition in 1897–98, nor were incidental expenses officially assessed. This left the school's athletic program needing to self-finance, which had been accomplished in the past through a small membership organization called the Oregon Agricultural College Athletic Association (OACAA), established in 1892.

At a meeting of the OAC student body early in the fall of 1897, it was resolved to tax each male member of the school 40 cents and each female member 30 cents "for the purpose of supporting the foot ball team and arranging some athletics for the ladies." In addition to helping fund the 1897 football squad, this action provided the volition for the establishment of a women's basketball team at OAC in the winter of 1897–98.

== Game summaries ==
=== Game 3: at Oregon ===
The November 20 road game was particularly well documented by an extensive article in the College Barometer, monthly magazine of Oregon Agricultural College. The OAC team, together with 20 supporters, made the three hour trek to Eugene aboard a special chartered rail car sponsored by the Corvallis Gazette and bedecked in the school color of orange. The train arrived in Eugene at 2:45 p.m. and it was not until 3:30 that the visiting squad made it to the field.

The team was met by a crowd of lemon yellow-bedecked fans creating a "perfect pandemonium" of "horns, bells, gongs, and every possible device for making noise," which were "all going full blast." The day was already growing late when the ball was kicked off to OAC at 3:40 p.m. Mixing effective runs off tackle with the occasional sprint around end, "the farmers" drove the ball downfield against "the dudes," scoring a 4-point touchdown and 2-point conversion to take a lead after just four minutes of play.

The Aggies held against the home team and methodically drove the ball down the field again, with starting tackle Thurston moved to the backfield and carrying the ball across the line as his teammates pushed him forward, for a 10–0 lead. Oregon answered with a touchdown of their own for a 10–4 halftime score.

The sun was already going down as the whistle blew for the start of the second half. Oregon fumbled on their own 35-yard line and the Orangemen made good of it, mixing their runs effectively for a 14–4 lead, extended to 16–4 when Gault made the conversion kick. Soon after, a pitch to Holgate around right end broke free for an 85-yard touchdown and a 20–4 advantage for the visitors. After an exchange of out-of-bounds punts, with darkness falling, Kuykendall scored for the Webfoots on a run around left end, making the score 20–8. OAC answered with a touchdown of their own for a seemingly insurmountable 24–8 advantage.

Although 18 minutes remained to be played, it was by now getting dark and the teams mutually agreed to end the game. A friendly reception for the Aggies followed at Villard Hall, with festivities breaking up at 10 p.m. for the train home.

"The ride home was short, for the hours passed quickly to the jolly crowd and the train pulled into Corvallis at 1:30, where the cadet band and the entire population of the city were at the depot to meet the victorious team," the narrator recounted.

=== Game 5: Washington ===
The 1897 season came to a triumphant close with a 16–0 whitewashing of the University of Washington, played on a muddy field in front of a boisterous home crowd of 1,500 fans. A holiday-like mood was in the air and contingents were present from the rival football towns of Eugene, Albany, Portland, and Monmouth to cheer on the Oregonians in their battle with the visitors from Seattle.

The game kicked off at 2:30 p.m. in a drizzling rain, with the Aggies receiving and returning the ball just short of midfield. The Aggies managed to work the ball into Washington territory, but turned over possession with a fumble. They were able to stop the visitors on three consecutive plays and took the ball back on downs. Making use of "tandems through the center and around the ends" they drove the ball the rest of the way home, with fullback John Gault doing honors into the end zone. A conversion kick made the score 6–0 Aggies with 13 minutes played in the game.

The Agrics scored a second touchdown of the first half 17 minutes later when, after a drive highlighted by a 20-yard run by the powerful J.J. Thurston, the Agrics scored again — this time with diminutive halfback H.A. Scoggins finding paydirt. John Gault again hit the conversion kick and it was 12–0 OAC at the half.

The farmers from the valley added a third touchdown after 15 minutes of play in the second stanza and seemed to be on their way to a fourth, having driven to the Washington 20-yard line, when time was called. The 16–0 score was the fourth OAC shutout in as many games at their home field and cemented the Aggies' claim as Northwest Champions for 1897.

== Roster ==
Official photo of the 1897 Northwest Champion OAC Aggies football team. Back row (L-R): Manager Edwards, Walters, Elgin, McAllister, Bodine (Captain), Thurston, Coach Will Bloss. Middle row: McBride, Galligher, Noel, Stimpson, Cree. Front Row: Buxton, Holmes, Scott, Pendleton, Scroggins, Kruse, Gault, Holgate.

According to a 1907 OAC football retrospective, the starting lineup of the 1897 team consisted of:

Ends

- Horace McBride
- Arthur J. Stimpson

Tackles

- J.J. Thurston
- Fred Walters

Guards

- Daniel H. Bodine (captain)
- J.G. Elgin

Center

- H.L. McAllister

Quarterback

- Archie Kruse

Halfbacks

- Don Holgate
- H.A. Scoggins

Fullback

- John Gault

Reserves appearing in the team photo:

- Harry E. Buxton
- Arthur Cree
- John Gallagher
- Andrew Holmes
- Leigh A. Noel
- George Pendleton
- Scott
