= 1897 California Golden Bears football team =

American college football season

1897 California Golden Bears football
- Conference: Independent
- Record: 0–3–2
- Head coach: Charles P. Nott (1st season)
- Captain: Percy W. Hall

1897 Far West college football independents records
	Conf.			Overall
Team	W	L	T	W		L		T
Oregon Agricultural		–		5	–	0	–	0
Washington Agricultural		–		2	–	0	–	0
Wyoming		–		2	–	0	–	0
USC		–		5	–	1	–	0
Stanford		–		4	–	1	–	0
New Mexico A&M		–		1	–	0	–	1
Oregon		–		1	–	1	–	0
Montana		–		1	–	2	–	3
Washington		–		1	–	2	–	0
Montana Agricultural		–		1	–	3	–	0
California		–		0	–	3	–	2
Utah		–		1	–	5	–	0
Arizona Normal		–		0	–	1	–	0
Idaho		–		0	–	1	–	0
Nevada State		–		0	–	1	–	0

The 1897 California Golden Bears football team was an American football team that represented the University of California, Berkeley during the 1897 college football season. The team competed as an independent under head coach Charles P. Nott and compiled a record of 0–3–2.

== Schedule ==
Date	Opponent	Site	Result	Attendance
September 25	Reliance Athletic Club	Berkeley, CA	L 0–12	
October 2	vs. Reliance Athletic Club	Recreation Park; San Francisco, CA	L 0–10	
October 9	Reliance Athletic Club	Berkeley, CA	T 4–4	
November 6	Reliance Athletic Club	Berkeley, CA	T 4–4	
November 25	vs. Stanford	Recreation Park; San Francisco, CA (Big Game)	L 0–28	15,000
