= Charles Nott =

Charles Nott may refer to:

- Charles P. Nott, head coach of the California Golden Bears college football team
- Charles C. Nott (1827–1916), chief justice of the United States Court of Claims
- Charles Cooper Nott Jr. (1869–1957), assistant district attorney and judge of the New York General Sessions Court
- Charles Stanley Nott (1887–1978), writer and mystic
