= Robert Gailey (American football) =

American football player and coach (1869–1950)

Biographical details
- Born: November 26, 1869; Fawn Grove, Pennsylvania, U.S.
- Died: January 18, 1950 (aged 80); Pasadena, California, U.S.

Playing career
- 1896: Princeton
- Position: Center

Coaching career (HC unless noted)
- 1897: Washington Agricultural

Head coaching record
- Overall: 2–0

Accomplishments and honors

Awards
- Consensus All-American (1896)

Robert Reed Gailey (November 26, 1869 – January 18, 1950) was an American college football player and coach. He served as the head football coach at Washington Agricultural College and School of Science—now known as Washington State University—for one season in 1897, compiling a record of 2–0.

Gailey was born in Fawn Grove, Pennsylvania. He graduated from Lafayette College in 1895 and subsequently earned a Master of Arts degree from Princeton University and a Bachelor of Divinity from the Princeton Theological Seminary. At Princeton, he played football in 1896, earning All-American honors playing at center. Gailey later founded the world service program of the YMCA of the USA. He died on January 18, 1950, at his home in Pasadena, California.

== Head coaching record ==
Year	Team	Overall	Conference	Standing	Bowl/playoffs
Washington Agricultural (Independent) (1897)
1897	Washington Agricultural	2–0			
Washington Agricultural:		2–0			
Total:		2–0			
