= 1897 Wyoming Cowboys football team =

American college football season

1897 Wyoming Cowboys football
- Conference: Independent
- Record: 2–0
- Head coach: Justus F. Soule (4th season)
- Captain: Harry Houston

1897 Far West college football independents records
| | Conf. | | | Overall |
| Team | W | L | T | W | | L | | T |
|---|---|---|---|---|---|---|---|---|
| Oregon Agricultural | | – | | 5 | – | 0 | – | 0 |
| Washington Agricultural | | – | | 2 | – | 0 | – | 0 |
| Wyoming | | – | | 2 | – | 0 | – | 0 |
| USC | | – | | 5 | – | 1 | – | 0 |
| Stanford | | – | | 4 | – | 1 | – | 0 |
| New Mexico A&M | | – | | 1 | – | 0 | – | 1 |
| Oregon | | – | | 1 | – | 1 | – | 0 |
| Montana | | – | | 1 | – | 2 | – | 3 |
| Washington | | – | | 1 | – | 2 | – | 0 |
| Montana Agricultural | | – | | 1 | – | 3 | – | 0 |
| California | | – | | 0 | – | 3 | – | 2 |
| Utah | | – | | 1 | – | 5 | – | 0 |
| Arizona Normal | | – | | 0 | – | 1 | – | 0 |
| Idaho | | – | | 0 | – | 1 | – | 0 |
| Nevada State | | – | | 0 | – | 1 | – | 0 |

The 1897 Wyoming Cowboys football team represented the University of Wyoming as an independent during the 1897 college football season. In its fourth season under head coach Justus F. Soule, a professor of Latin and Greek, the team compiled a perfect 2–0 record, consisting of victories over a team made up of the school's alumni and the Cheyenne High School team. Harry Houston was the team captain. In the program's first four years under coach Soule (1894-1897), the football team compiled an 8-0 record and outscored opponents by a total of 148 to 26.

== Schedule ==
| Date | Opponent | Site | Result |
|---|---|---|---|
| November 25 | Wyoming alumni | Laramie, WY | W 4–0 |
| December 16 | Cheyenne High School | Laramie, WY | W 16–0 |
