= Anthony Gould (American football) =

American football player (born 2001)

No. 6 – Indianapolis Colts
- Position: Wide receiver / Return specialist
- Roster status: Active

Personal information
- Born: April 6, 2001 (age 25); Leavenworth, Kansas, U.S.
- Listed height: 5 ft 8 in (1.73 m)
- Listed weight: 174 lb (79 kg)

Career information
- High school: West Salem (Salem, Oregon)
- College: Oregon State (2019–2023)
- NFL draft: 2024: 5th round, 142nd overall pick

Career history
- Indianapolis Colts (2024–present)

Awards and highlights
- First-team All-Pac-12 (2022)

Career NFL statistics as of 2025
- Receptions: 3
- Receiving yards: 29
- Return yards: 1,079
- Stats at Pro Football Reference

Anthony Gould (born April 6, 2001) is an American professional football wide receiver and return specialist for the Indianapolis Colts of the National Football League (NFL). He played college football for the Oregon State Beavers and was selected by the Colts in the fifth round of the 2024 NFL draft.

== Early life ==
Gould was born and grew up in Leavenworth, Kansas. He attended West Salem High School in Salem, Oregon, where he played football. Gould caught 58 passes for 1,191 yards, and 12 touchdowns, while also being a threat on the ground rushing for 744 yards and seven touchdowns. He committed to play college football at Oregon State University.

== College career ==
In his first two seasons Gould played in eight games, returning one punt for 14 yards. He took a redshirt as a freshman after playing four games. However, Gould stepped up in 2021. In week 2 win versus Hawaii, he brought in seven receptions for 119 yards and his first career touchdown. In week 7, Gould got his first rushing touchdown, as he took a sweep 14 yards for a touchdown in a 42–34 win over Utah. He finished the 2021 season with 13 receptions for 185 yards and a touchdown.

Gould had a breakout season in 2022. In the season opener he had a 74-yard reception to help set up a touchdown and finished the day with two receptions for 69 yards in a win over Boise State. The next week Gould had another huge catch, a 42-yard reception, to set up a touchdown for Deshuan Fenwick as Oregon State beat Fresno State on the final play of the game.

The following week against Montana State, Gould hauled in five receptions for 77 yards and two touchdowns, along with an 80-yard punt return touchdown. In Week 11, he hauled in two passes for 49 yards and returned a punt for a 54-yard touchdown.

Gould finished 2022 with 27 receptions for 457 yards and three touchdowns. He was named first-team All-Pac-12 and first-team All American, both as a punt returner.

In 2023, Gould played extensively as a wide receiver and a kick return specialist. He played 93% of his snaps from scrimmage as an outside receiver in 2023, as opposed to playing from the slot, and was regarded as one of the Pac-12's best deep threats. He finished the year with 44 receptions for 718 yards (16.3 yard per catch average) and scored two touchdowns for the Beavers. He also returned seven punts for 113 yards.

Gould tallied a total score of 75 at the 2024 NFL Scouting Combine, ranking 19th among wide receivers who participated. His time of 4.39 seconds in the 40-yard dash was the 19th fastest among all Combine participants and his "athleticism" score of 91 was the fourth best among wide outs.

== Professional career ==
Pre-draft measurables
Height	Weight	Arm length	Hand span	Wingspan	40-yard dash	10-yard split	20-yard split	20-yard shuttle	Three-cone drill	Vertical jump	Broad jump
5 ft 8 3/8 in (1.74 m)	174 lb (79 kg)	29 5/8 in (0.75 m)	8 7/8 in (0.23 m)	5 ft 9 7/8 in (1.77 m)	4.39 s	1.49 s	2.55 s	4.16 s	6.94 s	39.5 in (1.00 m)	10 ft 9 in (3.28 m)
All values from NFL Combine/Pro Day

Gould was selected by the Indianapolis Colts in the fifth round, 142nd overall, of the 2024 NFL draft. Throughout the 2024 season, he mainly served as a return specialist, recording four punt returns for a season-high 109 yards in his Week 1 NFL debut against the Houston Texans.

In the 2025 season, Gould's role of return specialist continued. He had two consecutive weeks of over 100 return yards, making three kick returns for 104 yards in Week 3 against the Tennessee Titans, as well as four kick returns for 91 yards and two punt returns for 31 yards (a combined career-high of 122 return yards in a single game) in Week 4 against the Los Angeles Rams. In 11 appearances (one start) for the Colts, Gould recorded two receptions for six scoreless yards. On December 27, 2025, Gould was placed on season-ending injured reserve due to a foot injury suffered in Week 14 against the Jacksonville Jaguars.

On August 30, 2026, Gould was waived by the Colts as a part of final roster cuts; he was re-signed to the team's practice squad the next day. He was promoted to the active roster on September 26.
