= 1897 Oregon Webfoots football team =

American college football season

1897 Oregon Webfoots football
- Conference: Independent
- Record: 1–1
- Head coach: Joe Smith (1st season)
- Captain: Richard Shore Smith
- Home stadium: Kincaid Field

1897 Far West college football independents records
	Conf.			Overall
Team	W	L	T	W		L		T
Oregon Agricultural		–		5	–	0	–	0
Washington Agricultural		–		2	–	0	–	0
Wyoming		–		2	–	0	–	0
USC		–		5	–	1	–	0
Stanford		–		4	–	1	–	0
New Mexico A&M		–		1	–	0	–	1
Oregon		–		1	–	1	–	0
Montana		–		1	–	2	–	3
Washington		–		1	–	2	–	0
Montana Agricultural		–		1	–	3	–	0
California		–		0	–	3	–	2
Utah		–		1	–	5	–	0
Arizona Normal		–		0	–	1	–	0
Idaho		–		0	–	1	–	0
Nevada State		–		0	–	1	–	0

The 1897 Oregon Webfoots football team represented the University of Oregon in the 1897 college football season. It was the Webfoots' fourth season; they competed as an independent and were led by head coach Joe Smith. They finished the season with a record of one win and one loss (1–1).

== Schedule ==
Date	Opponent	Site	Result	Source
November 6	Chemawa	Kincaid Field; Eugene, OR	W 10–0	
November 20	Oregon Agricultural	Kincaid Field; Eugene, OR (rivalry)	L 8–24	

== Background ==
Ahead of the 1897 football season, the faculty of the University of Oregon established a set of rules for athletes participating in the school's behalf in athletic events. All players were required to have attained 42 academic credits, with a 85% grade standing in all classes taken during the most recent semester. All players must have attended the school for one full year prior to playing and were required to "maintain a student character above reproach" to be eligible for competition.

Only games against other colleges were permitted, with the schedule required to be submitted to and approved by an elected committee of four faculty members. The season was also required to be terminated by December 1.
