= 1897 Washington football team =

American college football season

1897 Washington football
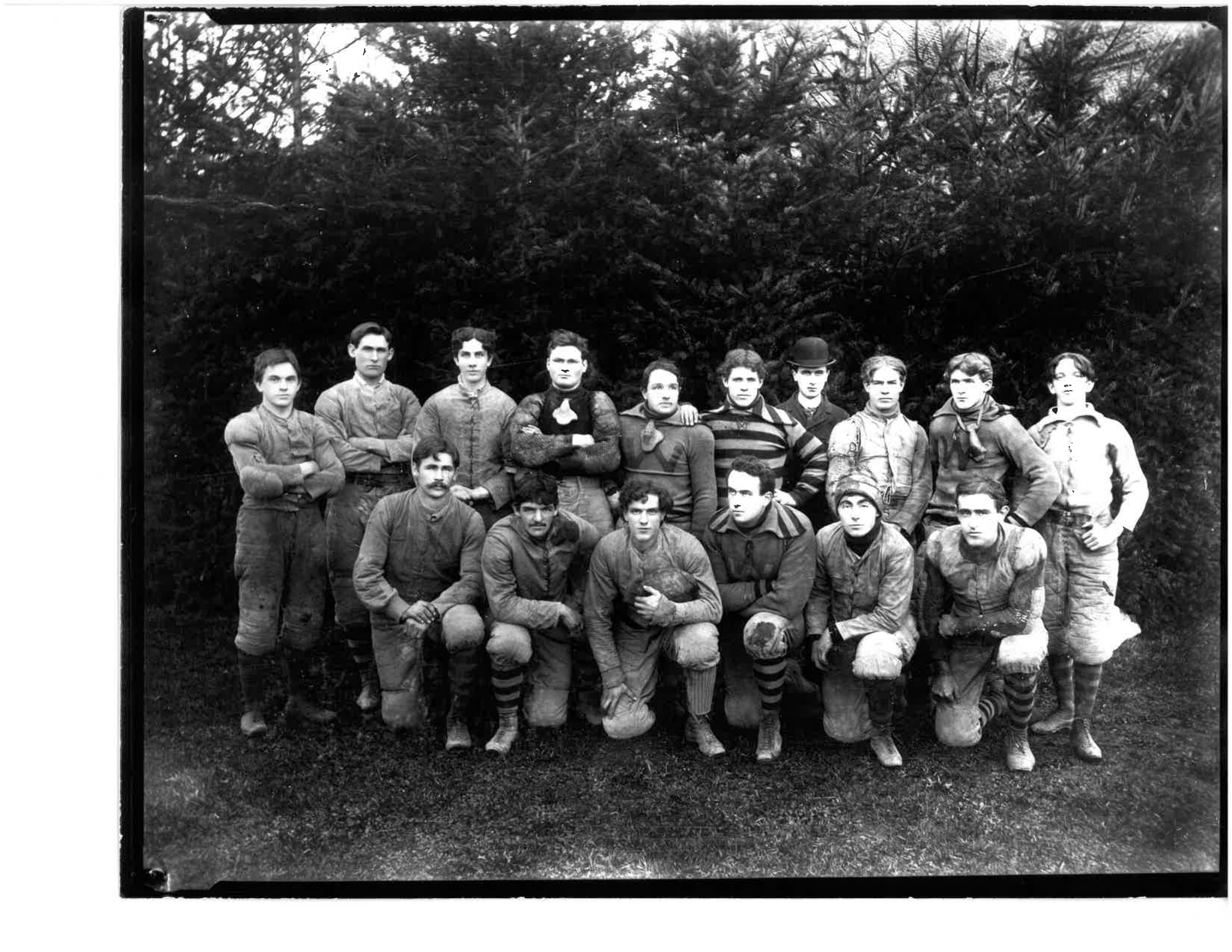
- Conference: Independent
- Record: 1–2
- Head coach: Carl L. Clemans (1st season)
- Captain: Jack Lindsay
- Home stadium: YMCA Park

1897 Far West college football independents records
	Conf.			Overall
Team	W	L	T	W		L		T
Oregon Agricultural		–		5	–	0	–	0
Washington Agricultural		–		2	–	0	–	0
Wyoming		–		2	–	0	–	0
USC		–		5	–	1	–	0
Stanford		–		4	–	1	–	0
New Mexico A&M		–		1	–	0	–	1
Oregon		–		1	–	1	–	0
Montana		–		1	–	2	–	3
Washington		–		1	–	2	–	0
Montana Agricultural		–		1	–	3	–	0
California		–		0	–	3	–	2
Utah		–		1	–	5	–	0
Arizona Normal		–		0	–	1	–	0
Idaho		–		0	–	1	–	0
Nevada State		–		0	–	1	–	0

The 1897 Washington football team was an American football team that represented the University of Washington as an independent during the 1897 college football season. In its first season under coach Carl L. Clemans, the team compiled a 1–2 record and was outscored by its opponents by a combined total of 26 to 16. For the second consecutive year, Jack Lindsay was the team captain.

== Schedule ==
Date	Time	Opponent	Site	Result	Attendance	Source
October 9		Seattle YMCA	YMCA Park; Seattle, WA	W 10–0	400	
November 25	1:20 p.m.	Seattle Athletic Club	YMCA Park; Seattle, WA	L 6–10	1,000	
December 4	2:30 p.m.	at Oregon Agricultural	Corvallis, OR	L 0–16	1,500	
