= Kefense Hynson =

American football coach (born c. 1980)

Personal information
- Born: c. 1980 (age 45–46); Oakland, California, U.S.

Career information
- Position: Defensive back
- College: Willamette (1999–2002)

Career history

Coaching
- Willamette (2003) Assistant wide receivers coach; Quincy (2003) Defensive backs coach; Minnesota State (2005) Running backs coach; Western Washington (2006) Wide receivers coach; Western Washington (2007–2008) Offensive coordinator; Yale (2009–2011) Co-offensive coordinator & wide receivers coach; Montana (2012) Special teams coordinator & tight ends coach; Montana (2013–2014) Co-offensive coordinator & quarterbacks coach; Norfolk State (2015) Wide receivers coach; Hawaii (2016–2017) Wide receivers coach; Oregon State (2018–2023) Wide receivers coach & pass game coordinator; Oregon State (2023) Interim head coach; Oregon State (2024) Wide receivers coach & pass game coordinator; Tampa Bay Buccaneers (2025) Passing game coordinator; UCF (2026–present) Passing game coordinator

Operations
- Boise State (2004) Director of football operations

Head coaching record
- Career: NCAA: 0–1 (.000)

Kefense Hynson (born c. 1980) is an American college football coach who serves as the passing game coordinator for University of Central Florida (UCF) football team. He previously served as the passing game coordinator for the Tampa Bay Buccaneers of the National Football League (NFL). He also played college football as a defensive back for Willamette.

== Coaching career ==
=== Yale ===
Hynson spent the 2009 to 2011 seasons as the co-offensive coordinator and wide receivers coach at Yale.

=== Montana ===
On June 29, 2012, Hynson joined Montana under the roles of special teams coordinator and tight ends coach. He was promoted to co-offensive coordinator in 2013, and shed the role of tight ends coach.

=== Norfolk State ===
On May 21, 2015, Norfolk State hired Hynson as their wide receivers coach.

=== Hawaii ===
On December 30, 2015, Hynson was hired to serve as the wide receivers coach for the Hawaii Rainbow Warriors.

=== Oregon State ===
Hynson previously served as the wide receivers coach & pass game coordinator for the Oregon State Beavers and was the interim head football coach for the team's bowl game during the 2023 season.

=== Tampa Bay Buccaneers ===
On February 3, 2025, the Tampa Bay Buccaneers hired Hynson to serve as their pass game coordinator.

=== UCF ===
On July 1, 2026, the UCF Knights hired Hynson to serve as the school's pass game coordinator.

== Head coaching record ==
Year	Team	Overall	Conference	Standing	Bowl/playoffs
Oregon State Beavers (Pac-12 Conference) (2023)
2023	Oregon State	0–1 (Note: Hynson was named interim head coach for the team's bowl game following Jonathan Smith's departure to Michigan State.)	0–0	T–4th	L Sun
Oregon State:		0–1	0–0		
Total:		0–1			
