= Will Bloss =

American football player and coach (1869–1921)

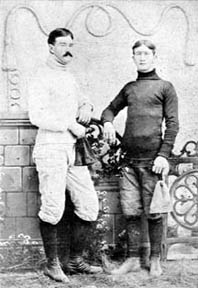
- Bloss (left) in 1893

Biographical details
- Born: April 4, 1869; Orleans, Indiana, U.S.
- Died: June 22, 1921 (aged 62); Richland County, Ohio, U.S.

Playing career
- 1889–1890: Indiana player_years2 = 1891
- 1893: Oregon Agricultural
- Position: Quarterback

Coaching career (HC unless noted)
- 1891: Washburn
- 1893: Oregon Agricultural
- 1897: Oregon Agricultural

Head coaching record
- Overall: 10–1

William Herbert Bloss Sr. (April 4, 1869 – June 22, 1921) was an American college football player and coach. He was the first head football coach at Oregon Agricultural College–now known as Oregon State University—serving for two seasons, in 1893 and again in 1897. Bloss was also the quarterback of the 1893 team. He was heralded by contemporaries as a "great coach" and one of the fiercest players on the field of the first two decades of football in the Pacific Northwest.

== Biography ==
=== Early life ===
Bloss was born April 4, 1869, in Orleans, Indiana.

Bloss attended Indiana University during the 1889–90 and 1891–92 academic years where he was a star player on the football team. He departed after two years — the second of which he was team captain — to become a player-coach at Washburn College in Topeka, Kansas.

With football coaching being a poorly remunerated part-time profession in this era, Bloss spent the next two years gainfully employed as a civil engineer in Arizona before moving to Corvallis, Oregon, in June 1892, where his father, John McKnight Bloss, had assumed the role of president of Oregon Agricultural College (OAC), today's Oregon State University.

=== Coaching career ===
Will Bloss was instrumental in organizing the first football team at OAC (today's Oregon State University). He goes down in the history books as the school's first coach, as well as the quarterback of the 1893-94 team. He was regarded years later as "a great coach and one of the fiercest players that ever figured in the game in the Northwest."

Bloss scheduled tryouts in the fall of 1893 in an attempt to cobble together a football team from a student body that counted just 148 men. By mid-October, he had managed to locate 16 other players that would comprise the first gridiron team in Oregon State's history. Getting to this end did result in a certain amount of fudging: four players were not even students, including Bloss himself, with one being a local high school junior and another a member of the faculty.

The first game was played on November 11, 1893, at 2:00pm at College Field on Lower Campus against Albany College. Over 500 spectators who paid a dime admission cheered on OAC (Oregon Agricultural College) to a lopsided 62–0 win. Right halfback Brady Burnett scored Oregon State's first touchdown in school history on a fumble return for a touchdown. Burnett would score an astounding seven touchdowns on the day, followed by six more in the team's second game, a 36–22 win on the road against Oregon State Normal School.

In that first season, OAC went on to a 5–1 record.

Bloss left Corvallis after the 1893–94 season, but returned to coach again in 1897. He did not quarterback the team. He led OAC to a 5–0 season, including victories over the state universities of Oregon and Washington. When Pacific University backed out of a "championship" game scheduled for Thanksgiving Day, the Agrics were accorded the title "Champions of the Northwest."

=== Life after football ===
In 1908 Will Bloss was said to be again working as a civil engineer in "one of the southern states."

During his last 14 years, Bloss worked as a district sales manager for the Ohio Brass Company. He was a Scottish Rite Freemason and a member of the Benevolent and Protective Order of Elks.

Bloss died suddenly at his home at 2:30 am the morning of June 22, 1921. He was survived by his wife, a daughter, and two sons. Bloss was buried at a family plot in Muncie, Indiana.

== Head coaching record ==
| Year | Team | Overall | Conference | Standing | Bowl/playoffs |
|---|---|---|---|---|---|
Oregon Agricultural Aggies (Independent) (1893)
| 1893 | Oregon Agricultural | 5–1 | | | |
Oregon Agricultural Aggies (Independent) (1897)
| 1897 | Oregon Agricultural | 5–0 | | | |
| Oregon Agricultural: | | 10–1 | | | |
| Total: | | 10–1 | | | |

== See also ==
- List of college football head coaches with non-consecutive tenure
