= Butte Business College =

College in Butte, Montana, US (1890 to 1975)

The Butte Business College was a business college in Butte, Montana from 1890 to 1975. It was founded by A.F. Rice, who died in 1957. The college occupied the fifth floor of the Owsley Block historic building. At the time of its closing, when it had about 100 students, school president Don Sparks said the school had been unable to obtain loans from local banks and a development corporation to fund operations.
