= List of Nevada Wolf Pack football seasons =

The following is a list of Nevada Wolf Pack football seasons for the football team that has represented the University of Nevada, Reno in NCAA competition.

== Seasons ==
Year	Coach	Overall	Conference	Standing	Bowl/playoffs	Coaches^{#}	AP^{°}
Frank Taylor (Independent) (1896)
1896	Frank Taylor	1–2					
Frank Taylor:		1–2					
William H. Harrelson (Independent) (1897)
1897	William H. Harrelson	0–1					
William H. Harrelson:		0–1					
F. F. Ellis (Independent) (1898)
1898	F. F. Ellis	4–1					
F. F. Ellis:		4–1					
A. King Dickson (Independent) (1899)
1899	A. King Dickson	3–2					
A. King Dickson:		3–2					
James Hopper (Independent) (1900)
1900	James Hopper	4–2–1					
James Hopper:		4–2–1					
Allen Steckle (Independent) (1901–1903)
1901	Allen Steckle	3–3					
1902	Allen Steckle	1–2					
1903	Allen Steckle	2–4–2					
Allen Steckle:		6–9–2					
Bruce Shorts (Independent) (1904)
1904	Bruce Shorts	3–3					
Bruce Shorts:		3–3					
1905	No coach	0–3–1					
1906–1914	No team						
Jack Glascock (Independent) (1915–1917)
1915	Jack Glascock	0–6					
1916	Jack Glascock	3–5					
1917	Jack Glascock	1–3					
Jack Glascock:		4–14					
1918	No team - WWI						
Ray Courtright (Independent) (1919–1923)
1919	Ray Courtright	8–1–1					
1920	Ray Courtright	7–3–1					
1921	Ray Courtright	4–3–1					
1922	Ray Courtright	5–3–1					
1923	Ray Courtright	2–3–3					
Ray Courtright:		26–13–7					
Charles F. Erb (Independent) (1924)
1924	Charles F. Erb	3–4–1					
Charles F. Erb:		3–4–1					
Buck Shaw (Far Western Conference) (1925–1928)
1925	Buck Shaw	4–3–1	3–1	2nd			
1926	Buck Shaw	4–4	3–1	2nd			
1927	Buck Shaw	2–6–1	1–3	5th			
1928	Buck Shaw	0–7–1	0–4–1	6th			
Buck Shaw:		10–20–3	7–9–1				
George Philbrook (Far Western Conference) (1929–1931)
1929	George Philbrook	2–5–1	2–1	2nd			
1930	George Philbrook	2–4–2	2–2	2nd			
1931	George Philbrook	2–5–2	2–1–1	T–1st			
George Philbrook:		6–15–5	6–4–1				
Brick Mitchell (Far Western Conference) (1932–1935)
1932	Brick Mitchell	3–3–2	2–0–1	T–1st			
1933	Brick Mitchell	4–4	3–0	1st			
1934	Brick Mitchell	1–7–1	0–4–1	6th			
1935	Brick Mitchell	2–6	2–2	3rd			
Brick Mitchell:		10–20–3	7–6–2				
Doug Dashiell (Far Western Conference) (1936–1938)
1936	Doug Dashiell	4–4	2–2	3rd			
1937	Doug Dashiell	2–6	1–3	4th			
1938	Doug Dashiell	2–3–1	1–2	3rd			
Doug Dashiell:		8–13–1	4–7				
Jim Aiken (Far Western Conference) (1939)
1939	Jim Aiken	5–4	3–1	2nd (Note: The 1939 Fresno State Bulldogs football team had the best record in the Far Western Conference (FWC), but was ineligible for the conference championship because they only played two league games.)			
Jim Aiken (Independent) (1940–1946)
1940	Jim Aiken	4–4–1					
1941	Jim Aiken	3–5–1					
1942	Jim Aiken	4–3–1					
1943	Jim Aiken	4–1–1					
1944	Jim Aiken	4–4					
1945	Jim Aiken	7–3					
1946	Jim Aiken	7–2			W Shrine Benefit Aloha		
Jim Aiken:		38–26–4	3–1				
Joe Sheeketski (Independent) (1947–1950)
1947	Joe Sheeketski	9–2			W Salad		
1948	Joe Sheeketski	9–2			L Harbor		
1949	Joe Sheeketski	5–5					
1950	Joe Sheeketski	1–9					
Joe Sheeketski:		24–18					
1951	No team						
Jake Lawlor (Independent) (1952–1953)
1952	Jake Lawlor	2–2					
1953	Jake Lawlor	2–3					
Jake Lawlor (Far Western Conference) (1954)
1954	Jake Lawlor	2–5	2–3	4th			
Jake Lawlor:		6–10	2–3				
Gordon McEachron (Far Western Conference) (1955–1958)
1955	Gordon McEachron	2–5	1–4	5th			
1956	Gordon McEachron	0–7–1	0–4–1	6th			
1957	Gordon McEachron	1–8	1–4	5th			
1958	Gordon McEachron	3–3	2–3	T–4th			
Gordon McEachron:		6–23–1	4–15–1				
Dick Trachok (Far Western Conference) (1959–1968)
1959	Dick Trachok	4–3	3–2	3rd			
1960	Dick Trachok	3–6	2–3	T–3rd			
1961	Dick Trachok	5–4	2–3	T–4th			
1962	Dick Trachok	5–3–1	2–2–1	3rd			
1963	Dick Trachok	3–6	2–3	5th			
1964	Dick Trachok	1–9	1–4	5th			
1965	Dick Trachok	6–4	4–1	2nd			
1966	Dick Trachok	6–3	3–3	T–3rd			
1967	Dick Trachok	4–4–1	2–3–1	5th			
1968	Dick Trachok	3–6–1	1–4–1	T–6th			
Dick Trachok:		40–48–3	22–28–3				
Jerry Scattini (NCAA College Division / Division II independent) (1969–1975)
1969	Jerry Scattini	5–5					
1970	Jerry Scattini	6–3–1					
1971	Jerry Scattini	5–5					
1972	Jerry Scattini	6–5					
1973	Jerry Scattini	7–4					
1974	Jerry Scattini	5–6					
1975	Jerry Scattini	3–8					
Jerry Scattini:		37–36–1					
Chris Ault (NCAA Division II independent) (1976–1977)
1976	Chris Ault	8–3					
1977	Chris Ault	8–3					7
Chris Ault (NCAA Division I-AA independent) (1978)
1978	Chris Ault	11–1			L NCAA Division I-AA Semifinal		1
Chris Ault (Big Sky Conference) (1979–1991)
1979	Chris Ault	8–4	5–2	2nd	L NCAA Division I-AA Semifinal		5
1980	Chris Ault	6–4–1	4–3	T–2nd			
1981	Chris Ault	7–4	4–3	T–4th			
1982	Chris Ault	6–5	3–4	T–5th			
1983	Chris Ault	10–4 (Note: In 1985, UNLV was forced to forfeit all 7 wins from the 1983 season and all 11 wins from the 1984 season, including their victory in the California Bowl. Ault and his team were given a win and the Fremont Cannon as a result. See Wikipedia:WikiProject College football/Vacated victories for an explanation of how vacated victories are recorded.)	6–1	1st	L NCAA Division I-AA Semifinal		11
1984	Chris Ault	7–4	5–2	2nd			
1985	Chris Ault	11–2	6–1	2nd	L NCAA Division I-AA Quarterfinal		2
1986	Chris Ault	13–1	7–0	1st	L NCAA Division I-AA Semifinal		1
1987	Chris Ault	5–6	4–4	T–4th			
1988	Chris Ault	7–4	4–4	T–4th			
1989	Chris Ault	7–4	5–3	T–3rd			19
1990	Chris Ault	13–2	7–1	1st	L NCAA Division I-AA Championship		4
1991	Chris Ault	12–1	8–0	1st	L NCAA Division I-AA Quarterfinal		1
Chris Ault (Big West Conference) (1992)
1992	Chris Ault	7–5	5–1	1st	L Las Vegas		
Chris Ault (first stint):		146–57–1	68–29				
Jeff Horton (Big West Conference) (1993)
1993	Jeff Horton	7–4	5–2	3rd			
Jeff Horton:		7–4	5–2				
Chris Ault (Big West Conference) (1994–1995)
1994	Chris Ault	9–2	6–1	T–1st			
1995	Chris Ault	9–3	7–0	1st	L Las Vegas		
Chris Ault (second stint):		18–5	13–1				
Jeff Tisdel (Big West Conference) (1996–1999)
1996	Jeff Tisdel	9–3	4–1	T–1st	W Las Vegas		
1997	Jeff Tisdel	5–6	4–1	T–1st			
1998	Jeff Tisdel	6–5	3–2	T–2nd			
1999	Jeff Tisdel	3–8	2–4	6th			
Jeff Tisdel:		23–22	13–8				
Chris Tormey (Western Athletic Conference) (2000–2003)
2000	Chris Tormey	2–10	1–7	9th			
2001	Chris Tormey	3–8	3–5	T–7th			
2002	Chris Tormey	5–7	4–4	T–4th			
2003	Chris Tormey	6–6	4–4	6th			
Chris Tormey:		16–31	12–20				
Chris Ault (Western Athletic Conference) (2004–2011)
2004	Chris Ault	5–7	3–5	T–6th			
2005	Chris Ault	9–3	7–1	T–1st	W Hawaii		
2006	Chris Ault	8–5	5–3	T–3rd	L MPC Computers		
2007	Chris Ault	6–7	4–4	T–4th	L New Mexico		
2008	Chris Ault	7–6	5–3	T–2nd	L Humanitarian		
2009	Chris Ault	8–5	7–1	2nd	L Hawaii		
2010	Chris Ault	13–1	7–1	T–1st	W Kraft Fight Hunger	13	11
2011	Chris Ault	7–6	5–2	T–2nd	L Hawaii		
Chris Ault (Mountain West Conference) (2012)
2012	Chris Ault	7–6	4–4	5th	L New Mexico		
Chris Ault (third stint):		70–46	47–24				
Chris Ault (total):		234–108–1	133–53				
Brian Polian (Mountain West Conference) (2013–2016)
2013	Brian Polian	4–8	3–5	5th (West)			
2014	Brian Polian	7–6	4–4	3rd (West)	L New Orleans		
2015	Brian Polian	7–6	4–4	T–2nd (West)	W Arizona		
2016	Brian Polian	5–7	3–5	T–3rd (West)			
Brian Polian:		23–27	13–18				
Jay Norvell (Mountain West Conference) (2017–2021)
2017	Jay Norvell	3–9	3–5	4th (West)			
2018	Jay Norvell	8–5	5–3	T–2nd (West)	W Arizona		
2019	Jay Norvell	7–6	4–4	3rd (West)	L Famous Idaho Potato		
2020	Jay Norvell	7–2	6–2	2nd	W Famous Idaho Potato		
2021	Jay Norvell / Vai Taua	8–5	5–3	3rd (West)	L Quick Lane (Note: Taua acted as the interim head coach for the 2021 Quick Lane Bowl as former head coach Jay Norvell had left the program prior to the game)		
Jay Norvell:		33–26	23–17				
Vai Taua:		0–1					
Ken Wilson (Mountain West Conference) (2022–2023)
2022	Ken Wilson	2–10	0–8	6th (West)			
2023	Ken Wilson	2–10	2–6	T–10th			
Ken Wilson:		4–20	2–14				
Jeff Choate (Mountain West Conference) (2024–present)
2024	Jeff Choate	3–10	0–7	12th			
2025	Jeff Choate	3–9	2–6	9th			
Jeff Choate:		6–19	2–13				
Total:		580–531–33 (.521)					
National championship Conference title Conference division title or championship game berth
