= 1898 University of Utah football team =

American college football season

1898 University of Utah football
- Conference: Independent
- Record: 2–1
- Head coach: Benjamin Wilson (1st season)
- Home stadium: University campus

1898 Far West college football independents records
	Conf.			Overall
Team	W	L	T	W		L		T
San Jose Normal		–		5	–	0	–	1
California		–		8	–	0	–	2
Nevada State		–		4	–	1	–	0
USC		–		5	–	1	–	1
Gonzaga		–		1	–	0	–	1
Oregon		–		3	–	1	–	0
New Mexico A&M		–		2	–	1	–	0
Utah		–		2	–	1	–	0
Stanford		–		5	–	3	–	1
Montana		–		3	–	2	–	0
Saint Mary's		–		3	–	2	–	0
Denver		–		6	–	4	–	1
Washington		–		1	–	1	–	0
Oregon Agricultural		–		1	–	2	–	1
Washington Agricultural		–		0	–	0	–	1
Utah Agricultural		–		0	–	1	–	0
Montana Agricultural		–		0	–	2	–	0
Pacific (CA)		–		0	–	0	–	2
Wyoming		–		0	–	4	–	0

The 1898 University of Utah football team was an American football team that represented the University of Utah as an independent during the 1898 college football season. Head coach Benjamin Wilson led the team to a 2–1 record.

== Schedule ==
Date	Time	Opponent	Site	Result	Source
November 11	4:00 p.m.	at Salt Lake City High School	University campus; Salt Lake City, UT	L 0–6	
November 24		Brigham Young Academy	University campus; Salt Lake City, UT	W 5–0	
December 10		All Hallows College	Salt Lake City, UT	W forfeit	
