= Searight =

Searight is a surname. Notable people with the surname include:

- Benjamin F. Searight (1873–1937), American football player and coach
- Kenneth Searight (1883–1957), British language creator
- Robert Searight (born c. 1976), American drummer
- Theresa Clay Searight (1911–1995), English entomologist
