= 1898 Oregon Webfoots football team =

American college football season

1898 Oregon Webfoots football
- Conference: Independent
- Record: 3–1
- Head coach: Frank W. Simpson (1st season)
- Captain: Richard Shore Smith
- Home stadium: Kincaid Field

1898 Far West college football independents records
| | Conf. | | | Overall |
| Team | W | L | T | W | | L | | T |
|---|---|---|---|---|---|---|---|---|
| San Jose Normal | | – | | 5 | – | 0 | – | 1 |
| California | | – | | 8 | – | 0 | – | 2 |
| Nevada State | | – | | 4 | – | 1 | – | 0 |
| USC | | – | | 5 | – | 1 | – | 1 |
| Gonzaga | | – | | 1 | – | 0 | – | 1 |
| Oregon | | – | | 3 | – | 1 | – | 0 |
| New Mexico A&M | | – | | 2 | – | 1 | – | 0 |
| Utah | | – | | 2 | – | 1 | – | 0 |
| Stanford | | – | | 5 | – | 3 | – | 1 |
| Montana | | – | | 3 | – | 2 | – | 0 |
| Saint Mary's | | – | | 3 | – | 2 | – | 0 |
| Denver | | – | | 6 | – | 4 | – | 1 |
| Washington | | – | | 1 | – | 1 | – | 0 |
| Oregon Agricultural | | – | | 1 | – | 2 | – | 1 |
| Washington Agricultural | | – | | 0 | – | 0 | – | 1 |
| Utah Agricultural | | – | | 0 | – | 1 | – | 0 |
| Montana Agricultural | | – | | 0 | – | 2 | – | 0 |
| Pacific (CA) | | – | | 0 | – | 0 | – | 2 |
| Wyoming | | – | | 0 | – | 4 | – | 0 |

The 1898 Oregon Webfoots football team represented the University of Oregon in the 1898 college football season. It was the Webfoots' fifth season; they competed as an independent and were led by head coach Frank W. Simpson. They finished the season with a record of three wins and one loss (3–1).

== Schedule ==
| Date | Opponent | Site | Result | Attendance | Source |
|---|---|---|---|---|---|
| November 5 | Chemawa | Kincaid Field; Eugene, OR | W 34–0 | | |
| November 24 | Portland University | Kincaid Field; Eugene, OR | W 95–0 | | |
| December 3 | at Multnomah Amateur Athletic Club | Multnomah Field; Portland, OR | L 0–21 | | |
| December 10 | at Oregon Agricultural | Oregon Agricultural College field; Corvallis, OR (rivalry) | W 38–0 | 1,000 | |
