= Theron W. Mortimer =

American football player and sports coach (1872–1952)

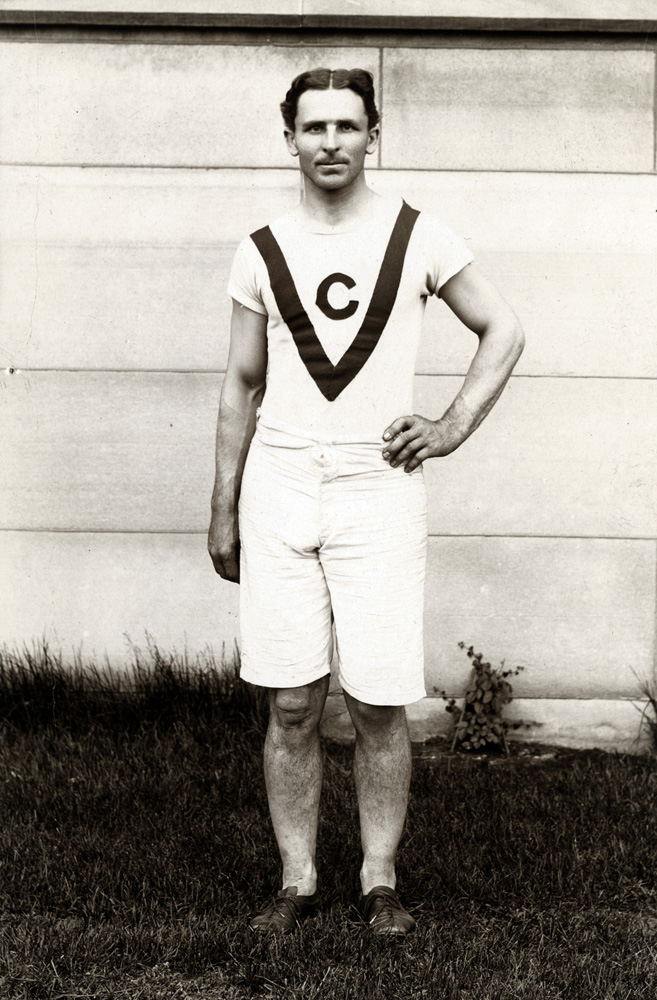
- Mortimer at Chicago

Biographical details
- Born: May 27, 1872; Minburn, Iowa, U.S.
- Died: October 1, 1952 (aged 80); Los Angeles County, California, U.S.

Playing career

Football
- c. 1895: Simpson (IA)
- 1896–1899: Chicago

Track and field
- 1898–1900: Chicago
- Position: Tackle (football)

Coaching career (HC unless noted)

Football
- 1900: Colorado
- 1901: Alma
- 1905: Blair Business College

Baseball
- 1900: Colorado

Head coaching record
- Overall: 4–2 (baseball)

Theron Winifred Mortimer (May 27, 1872 – October 1, 1952) was an American football player and coach of football and baseball. He served as the head football coach at the University of Colorado at Boulder in 1900 and at Alma College in 1901. Mortimer was also the head baseball coach at Colorado in 1900, tallying a mark of 4–2. Mortimer graduated from Simpson College in 1896 and played football as a tackle at the University of Chicago from 1896 to 1899.

In 1905, Mortimer was working in the real estate business in Spokane, Washington, and coached the football team at Blair Business College.

== Head coaching record ==
=== Football ===
Year	Team	Overall	Conference	Standing
Colorado Silver and Gold (Colorado Football Association) (1900)
1900	Colorado	6–4	1–2	3rd
Colorado:		6–4	1–2	
Alma Maroon and Cream (Independent) (1901)
1901	Alma	3–2		
Alma:		3–2		
Total:				
