= List of Nevada Wolf Pack head football coaches =

List of head football coaches for the Nevada Wolf Pack

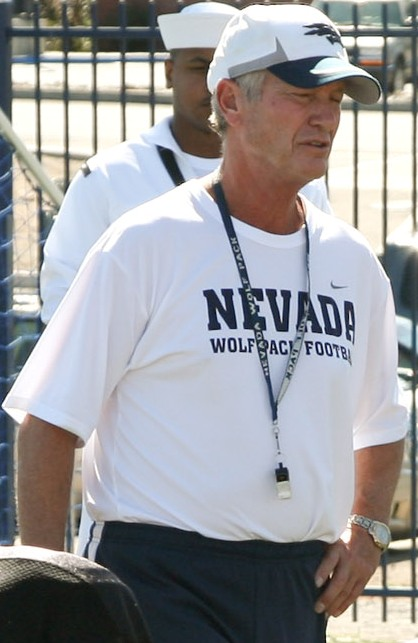
Chris Ault won the most games during his tenure with the Wolf Pack.

The Nevada Wolf Pack college football team represents the University of Nevada, Reno as a member of the Mountain West Conference (MWC), as part of the NCAA Division I Football Bowl Subdivision. The program has had 28 head coaches, and 1 interim head coach, since it began play during the 1896 season. Since December 2023, Jeff Choate has served as Nevada's head coach.

Six coaches have led Nevada in postseason bowl games or playoffs: Joe Sheeketski, Chris Ault, Jeff Tisdel, Brian Polian, Jay Norvell, and Vai Taua. Four coaches also won conference championships: Brick Mitchell captured two and Jim Aiken one as a member of the Far Western Conference; Ault captured four as a member of the Big Sky Conference, three as a member of the Big West Conference, and two as a member of the Western Athletic Conference; and Tisdel captured two as a member of the Big West.

Ault is the leader in seasons coached, with 28 years as head coach and games coached (343), won (234). F. F. Ellis has the highest winning percentage at 0.800. Ken Wilson has the lowest winning percentage of those who have coached more than one game, with 0.167. Of the 28 different head coaches who have led the Wolf Pack, Buck Shaw and Ault have been inducted into the College Football Hall of Fame.

== Key ==
Key to symbols in coaches list
General		Overall		Conference		Postseason (Note: Although the first Rose Bowl Game was played in 1902, it has been continuously played since the 1916 game, and is recognized as the oldest bowl game by the NCAA. "—" indicates any season prior to 1916 when postseason games were not played.)	
No.	Order of coaches (Note: A running total of the number of head coaches, with coaches who served separate tenures being counted only once. Interim head coaches are represented with "Int" and are not counted in the running total. "—" indicates the team played but either without a coach or no coach is on record. "X" indicates an interim year without play.)	GC	Games coached	CW	Conference wins	PW	Postseason wins
DC	Division championships	OW	Overall wins	CL	Conference losses	PL	Postseason losses
CC	Conference championships	OL	Overall losses	CT	Conference ties	PT	Postseason ties
NC	National championships	OT	Overall ties (Note: Overtime rules in college football were introduced in 1996, making ties impossible in the period since.)	C%	Conference winning percentage		
†	Elected to the College Football Hall of Fame	O%	Overall winning percentage (Note: When computing the win–loss percentage, a tie counts as half a win and half a loss.)				

== Coaches ==
List of head football coaches showing season(s) coached, overall records, conference records, postseason records, championships and selected awards (Note: Statistics correct as of the end of the 2025 NCAA Division I FCS football season.)
No.	Name	Year(s)	Season(s)	GC	OW	OL	OT	O%	CW	CL	CT	C%	PW	PL	PT	DC	CC	NC	Awards
1	Frank Taylor	1896	1	3	1	2	0	0.333	—	—	—	—	—	—	—	—	—	0	—
2	William H. Harrelson	1897	1	1	0	1	0	.000	—	—	—	—	—	—	—	—	—	0	—
3	F. F. Ellis	1898	1	5	4	1	0	0.800	—	—	—	—	—	—	—	—	—	0	—
4	A. King Dickson	1899	1	5	3	2	0	0.600	—	—	—	—	—	—	—	—	—	0	—
5	James Hopper	1900	1	7	4	2	1	0.643	—	—	—	—	—	—	—	—	—	0	—
6	Allen Steckle	1901–1903	3	17	6	9	2	0.412	—	—	—	—	—	—	—	—	—	0	—
7	Bruce Shorts	1904	1	6	3	3	0	0.500	—	—	—	—	—	—	—	—	—	0	—
8	Jack Glascock	1915–1917	3	18	4	14	0	0.222	—	—	—	—	—	—	—	—	—	0	—
9	Ray Courtright	1919–1923	5	46	26	13	7	0.641	—	—	—	—	—	—	—	—	—	0	—
10	Charles F. Erb	1924	1	8	3	4	1	0.438	—	—	—	—	—	—	—	—	—	0	—
11	Buck Shaw^{†}	1925–1928	4	33	10	20	3	0.348	7	9	1	0.441	—	—	—	—	0	0	—
12	George Philbrook	1929–1931	3	26	6	15	5	0.327	6	4	1	0.591	—	—	—	—	0	0	—
13	Brick Mitchell	1932–1935	4	33	10	20	3	0.348	7	6	2	0.533	—	—	—	—	2	0	—
14	Doug Dashiell	1936–1938	3	22	8	13	1	0.386	4	7	0	0.364	—	—	—	—	0	0	—
15	Jim Aiken	1939–1946	8	68	38	26	4	0.588	3	1	0	0.750	—	—	—	—	1	0	—
16	Joe Sheeketski	1947–1950	4	42	24	18	0	0.571	—	—	—	—	1	1	0	—	—	0	—
17	Jake Lawlor	1952–1954	3	16	6	10	0	0.375	2	3	0	0.400	0	0	0	—	0	0	—
18	Gordon McEachron	1955–1958	4	30	6	23	1	0.217	4	15	1	0.225	0	0	0	—	0	0	—
19	Dick Trachok	1959–1968	10	91	40	48	3	0.456	22	28	3	0.443	0	0	0	—	0	0	—
20	Jerry Scattini	1969–1975	7	74	37	36	1	0.507	—	—	—	—	0	0	0	—	—	0	—
21	Chris Ault^{†}	1976–1992; 1994–1995; 2004–2012	17, 2, 9	343	234	108	1	0.684	133	53	0	0.715	11	15	0	—	9	0	—
22	Jeff Horton	1993	1	11	7	4	0	0.636	5	2	0	0.714	0	0	0	—	0	0	—
23	Jeff Tisdel	1996–1999	4	45	23	22	—	0.511	13	8	—	0.619	1	0	—	—	2	0	—
24	Chris Tormey	2000–2003	4	47	16	31	—	0.340	12	20	—	0.375	0	0	—	—	0	0	—
25	Brian Polian	2013–2016	4	50	23	27	—	0.460	14	18	—	0.438	1	1	—	0	0	0	—
26	Jay Norvell	2017–2021	5	59	33	26	—	0.559	23	17	—	0.575	2	1	—	0	0	0	—
Int	Vai Taua	2021	1	1	0	1	—	.000	0	0	—	–	0	1	—	0	0	0	—
27	Ken Wilson	2022–2023	2	24	4	20	—	0.167	2	14	—	0.125	0	0	—	0	0	0	—
28	Jeff Choate	2024–present	2	25	6	19	—	0.240	2	13	—	0.133	0	0	—	0	0	0	—
