= 1898 Utah Agricultural Aggies football team =

American college football season

1898 Utah Agricultural Aggies football
- Conference: Independent
- Record: 0–1
- Head coach: Samuel Dunning (1st season)

1898 Far West college football independents records
	Conf.			Overall
Team	W	L	T	W		L		T
San Jose Normal		–		5	–	0	–	1
California		–		8	–	0	–	2
Nevada State		–		4	–	1	–	0
USC		–		5	–	1	–	1
Gonzaga		–		1	–	0	–	1
Oregon		–		3	–	1	–	0
New Mexico A&M		–		2	–	1	–	0
Utah		–		2	–	1	–	0
Stanford		–		5	–	3	–	1
Montana		–		3	–	2	–	0
Saint Mary's		–		3	–	2	–	0
Denver		–		6	–	4	–	1
Washington		–		1	–	1	–	0
Oregon Agricultural		–		1	–	2	–	1
Washington Agricultural		–		0	–	0	–	1
Utah Agricultural		–		0	–	1	–	0
Montana Agricultural		–		0	–	2	–	0
Pacific (CA)		–		0	–	0	–	2
Wyoming		–		0	–	4	–	0

The 1898 Utah Agricultural Aggies football team was an American football team that represented Utah Agricultural College (later renamed Utah State University) during the 1898 college football season. In their first and only season, under head coach Samuel Dunning, the Aggies compiled a 0–1 record.

The players on the 1898 team included Orval Adams, Irwin Allred, and J.L. Kearns.

== Schedule ==
Date	Opponent	Site	Result	Source
November 12	at Brigham Young College	Logan, UT	L 5–12	
