= 1898 Montana football team =

American college football season

1898 Montana football
- Conference: Independent
- Record: 3–2
- Head coach: Benjamin F. Searight (1st season)

1898 Far West college football independents records
| | Conf. | | | Overall |
| Team | W | L | T | W | | L | | T |
|---|---|---|---|---|---|---|---|---|
| San Jose Normal | | – | | 5 | – | 0 | – | 1 |
| California | | – | | 8 | – | 0 | – | 2 |
| Nevada State | | – | | 4 | – | 1 | – | 0 |
| USC | | – | | 5 | – | 1 | – | 1 |
| Gonzaga | | – | | 1 | – | 0 | – | 1 |
| Oregon | | – | | 3 | – | 1 | – | 0 |
| New Mexico A&M | | – | | 2 | – | 1 | – | 0 |
| Utah | | – | | 2 | – | 1 | – | 0 |
| Stanford | | – | | 5 | – | 3 | – | 1 |
| Montana | | – | | 3 | – | 2 | – | 0 |
| Saint Mary's | | – | | 3 | – | 2 | – | 0 |
| Denver | | – | | 6 | – | 4 | – | 1 |
| Washington | | – | | 1 | – | 1 | – | 0 |
| Oregon Agricultural | | – | | 1 | – | 2 | – | 1 |
| Washington Agricultural | | – | | 0 | – | 0 | – | 1 |
| Utah Agricultural | | – | | 0 | – | 1 | – | 0 |
| Montana Agricultural | | – | | 0 | – | 2 | – | 0 |
| Pacific (CA) | | – | | 0 | – | 0 | – | 2 |
| Wyoming | | – | | 0 | – | 4 | – | 0 |

The 1898 Montana football team represented the University of Montana in the 1898 college football season. They were led by first-year head coach Benjamin F. Searight, and finished the season with a record of three wins and two losses (3–2).

== Schedule ==
| Date | Opponent | Site | Result | Source |
|---|---|---|---|---|
| October 14 | at Helena High School | Athletic Park; Helena, MT | L 5–6 | |
| October 29 | Anaconda Athletic Club | Missoula, MT | L 0–18 | |
| | Helena Athletic Club | Missoula, MT | W 5–0 | |
| November 13 | at Montana Agricultural | Bozeman, MT (rivalry) | W 6–0 | |
| November 24 | Montana Agricultural | Missoula, MT | W 16–0 | |
