= 1898 USC Methodists football team =

American college football season

1898 USC Methodists football
- Conference: Independent
- Record: 5–1–1
- Head coach: None
- Captain: Foster Wright

1898 Far West college football independents records
	Conf.			Overall
Team	W	L	T	W		L		T
San Jose Normal		–		5	–	0	–	1
California		–		8	–	0	–	2
Nevada State		–		4	–	1	–	0
USC		–		5	–	1	–	1
Gonzaga		–		1	–	0	–	1
Oregon		–		3	–	1	–	0
New Mexico A&M		–		2	–	1	–	0
Utah		–		2	–	1	–	0
Stanford		–		5	–	3	–	1
Montana		–		3	–	2	–	0
Saint Mary's		–		3	–	2	–	0
Denver		–		6	–	4	–	1
Washington		–		1	–	1	–	0
Oregon Agricultural		–		1	–	2	–	1
Washington Agricultural		–		0	–	0	–	1
Utah Agricultural		–		0	–	1	–	0
Montana Agricultural		–		0	–	2	–	0
Pacific (CA)		–		0	–	0	–	2
Wyoming		–		0	–	4	–	0

The 1898 USC Methodists football team was an American football team that represented the University of Southern California during the 1898 college football season. The team competed as an independent without a head coach, compiling a 5–1–1 record.

== Schedule ==
Date	Opponent	Site	Result
October 15	vs. Los Angeles High School	Athletic Park; Los Angeles, CA	T 0–0
October 22	Pasadena AC	Los Angeles, CA	W 17–0
November 19	vs. Los Angeles High School	Fiesta Park; Los Angeles, CA	L 0–6
November 24	vs. Pomona	Fiesta Park; Los Angeles, CA	W 14–11
November 26	vs. Company F, 1st Battalion, 7th Regiment, California National Guard	Fiesta Park; Los Angeles, CA	W 34–0
December 3	vs. Phoenix Indian School	Fiesta Park; Los Angeles, CA	W 27–11
January 2	at Santa Barbara AC	Santa Barbara, CA	W 5–0
