= 1898 Washington Agricultural football team =

American college football season

1898 Washington Agricultural football
- Conference: Independent
- Record: 0–0–1
- Head coach: Frank Shively (1st season)
- Captain: Boyd Hamilton
- Home stadium: Soldier Field

1898 Far West college football independents records
	Conf.			Overall
Team	W	L	T	W		L		T
San Jose Normal		–		5	–	0	–	1
California		–		8	–	0	–	2
Nevada State		–		4	–	1	–	0
USC		–		5	–	1	–	1
Gonzaga		–		1	–	0	–	1
Oregon		–		3	–	1	–	0
New Mexico A&M		–		2	–	1	–	0
Utah		–		2	–	1	–	0
Stanford		–		5	–	3	–	1
Montana		–		3	–	2	–	0
Saint Mary's		–		3	–	2	–	0
Denver		–		6	–	4	–	1
Washington		–		1	–	1	–	0
Oregon Agricultural		–		1	–	2	–	1
Washington Agricultural		–		0	–	0	–	1
Utah Agricultural		–		0	–	1	–	0
Montana Agricultural		–		0	–	2	–	0
Pacific (CA)		–		0	–	0	–	2
Wyoming		–		0	–	4	–	0

The 1898 Washington Agricultural football team was an American football team that represented Washington Agricultural College during the 1898 college football season. The team competed as an independent under head coach Frank Shively and compiled a record of 0–0–1.

== Schedule ==
Date	Time	Opponent	Site	Result	Source
November 5	2:00 p.m.	Whitman	Pullman, WA	T 0–0	
November 24		at Idaho	Moscow, ID (rivalry)	Cancelled	
