= 1898 Wyoming Cowboys football team =

American college football season

1898 Wyoming Cowboys football
- Conference: Independent
- Record: 0–4
- Head coach: Fred Hess (3rd season)
- Captain: Harry Houston

1898 Far West college football independents records
	Conf.			Overall
Team	W	L	T	W		L		T
San Jose Normal		–		5	–	0	–	1
California		–		8	–	0	–	2
Nevada State		–		4	–	1	–	0
USC		–		5	–	1	–	1
Gonzaga		–		1	–	0	–	1
Oregon		–		3	–	1	–	0
New Mexico A&M		–		2	–	1	–	0
Utah		–		2	–	1	–	0
Stanford		–		5	–	3	–	1
Montana		–		3	–	2	–	0
Saint Mary's		–		3	–	2	–	0
Denver		–		6	–	4	–	1
Washington		–		1	–	1	–	0
Oregon Agricultural		–		1	–	2	–	1
Washington Agricultural		–		0	–	0	–	1
Utah Agricultural		–		0	–	1	–	0
Montana Agricultural		–		0	–	2	–	0
Pacific (CA)		–		0	–	0	–	2
Wyoming		–		0	–	4	–	0

The 1898 Wyoming Cowboys football team represented the University of Wyoming as an independent during the 1898 college football season. In its third non-consecutive season under head coach Fred Hess, the team compiled a 0–4 record and was outscored by a total of 95 to 8. The season included the first scheduled games with teams from the Colorado School of Mines and the University of Denver. Harry Houston was the team captain for the second consecutive year.

== Schedule ==
Date	Opponent	Site	Result
October 15	Colorado Mines	Laramie, WY	L 0–29
November 5	at Colorado Mines	Golden, CO	L 0–50
November 24	Denver	Laramie, WY	L 0–5
November 29	Laramie High School	Laramie, WY	L 8–11
