= 1898 Washington football team =

American college football season

1898 Washington football
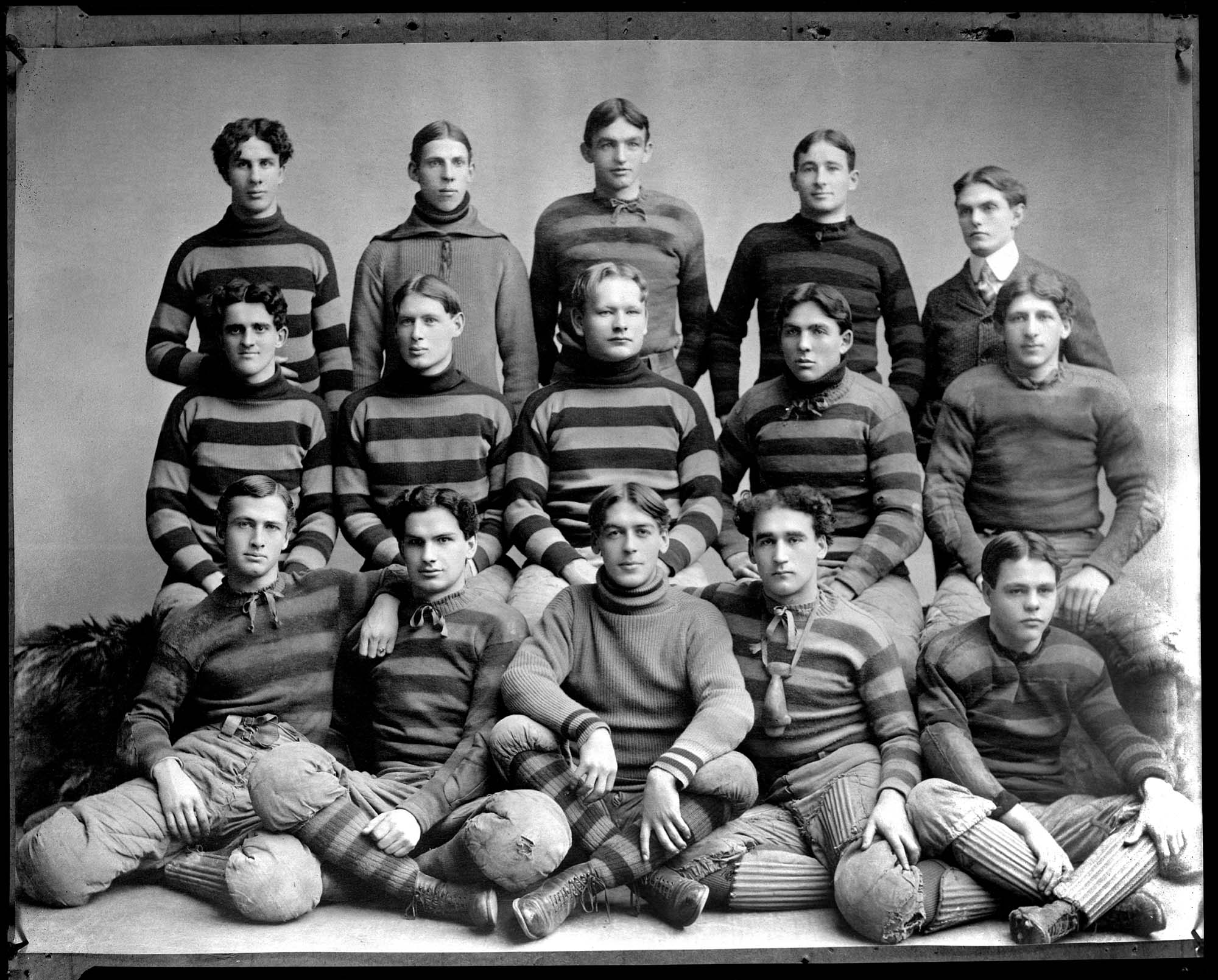
- Conference: Independent
- Record: 1–1
- Head coach: Ralph Nichols (3rd season)
- Captain: Clarence M. Larson

1898 Far West college football independents records
	Conf.			Overall
Team	W	L	T	W		L		T
San Jose Normal		–		5	–	0	–	1
California		–		8	–	0	–	2
Nevada State		–		4	–	1	–	0
USC		–		5	–	1	–	1
Gonzaga		–		1	–	0	–	1
Oregon		–		3	–	1	–	0
New Mexico A&M		–		2	–	1	–	0
Utah		–		2	–	1	–	0
Stanford		–		5	–	3	–	1
Montana		–		3	–	2	–	0
Saint Mary's		–		3	–	2	–	0
Denver		–		6	–	4	–	1
Washington		–		1	–	1	–	0
Oregon Agricultural		–		1	–	2	–	1
Washington Agricultural		–		0	–	0	–	1
Utah Agricultural		–		0	–	1	–	0
Montana Agricultural		–		0	–	2	–	0
Pacific (CA)		–		0	–	0	–	2
Wyoming		–		0	–	4	–	0

The 1898 Washington football team was an American football team that represented the University of Washington as an independent during the 1898 college football season. In its third, non-consecutive season under coach Ralph Nichols, the team compiled a 1–1 record and outscored its opponents by a combined total of 24 to 18. Clarence Larson was the team captain.

On October 11, the University of Washington Athletic Association adopted a resolution that the university would not field a football team for the season.

== Schedule ==
Date	Time	Opponent	Site	Result	Attendance	Source
December 17	2:30 p.m.	vs. Puyallup Indians	Eleventh Street Grounds; Tacoma, WA	L 11–18	500	
December 24	2:00 p.m.	Puyallup Indians	Seattle, WA	W 12–0	400	
