= 1898 Oregon Agricultural Aggies football team =

American college football season

1898 Oregon Agricultural Aggies football
- Conference: Independent
- Record: 1–2–1
- Head coach: William McIntosh
- Captain: Grant Elgin
- Home stadium: OAC Field

1898 Far West college football independents records
	Conf.			Overall
Team	W	L	T	W		L		T
San Jose Normal		–		5	–	0	–	1
California		–		8	–	0	–	2
Nevada State		–		4	–	1	–	0
USC		–		5	–	1	–	1
Gonzaga		–		1	–	0	–	1
Oregon		–		3	–	1	–	0
New Mexico A&M		–		2	–	1	–	0
Utah		–		2	–	1	–	0
Stanford		–		5	–	3	–	1
Montana		–		3	–	2	–	0
Saint Mary's		–		3	–	2	–	0
Denver		–		6	–	4	–	1
Washington		–		1	–	1	–	0
Oregon Agricultural		–		1	–	2	–	1
Washington Agricultural		–		0	–	0	–	1
Utah Agricultural		–		0	–	1	–	0
Montana Agricultural		–		0	–	2	–	0
Pacific (CA)		–		0	–	0	–	2
Wyoming		–		0	–	4	–	0

The 1898 Oregon Agricultural Aggies football team represented Oregon Agricultural College (OAC)—now known as Oregon State University—as an independent during the 1898 college football season. The Aggies compiled a record of 1–2–1.

== Schedule ==
Date	Opponent	Site	Result	Attendance	Source
November 12	at Albany College (OR)	Albany College field; Albany, OR	W 21–0		
November 24	Pacific (OR)	OAC Field; Corvallis, OR	T 5–5		
December 3	Chemawa	OAC Field; Corvallis, OR	L 0–29		
December 10	Oregon	OAC Field; Corvallis, OR (rivalry)	L 0–38	1,000	
