= 1898 California Golden Bears football team =

American college football season

1898 California Golden Bears football
- Conference: Independent
- Record: 8–0–2
- Head coach: Garrett Cochran (1st season)
- Captain: Percy W. Hall

1898 Far West college football independents records
	Conf.			Overall
Team	W	L	T	W		L		T
San Jose Normal		–		5	–	0	–	1
California		–		8	–	0	–	2
Nevada State		–		4	–	1	–	0
USC		–		5	–	1	–	1
Gonzaga		–		1	–	0	–	1
Oregon		–		3	–	1	–	0
New Mexico A&M		–		2	–	1	–	0
Utah		–		2	–	1	–	0
Stanford		–		5	–	3	–	1
Montana		–		3	–	2	–	0
Saint Mary's		–		3	–	2	–	0
Denver		–		6	–	4	–	1
Washington		–		1	–	1	–	0
Oregon Agricultural		–		1	–	2	–	1
Washington Agricultural		–		0	–	0	–	1
Utah Agricultural		–		0	–	1	–	0
Montana Agricultural		–		0	–	2	–	0
Pacific (CA)		–		0	–	0	–	2
Wyoming		–		0	–	4	–	0

The 1898 California Golden Bears football team was an American football team that represented the University of California, Berkeley during the 1898 college football season. The team competed as an independent under head coach Garrett Cochran and compiled a record of 8–0–2. The season's victory in that year's Big Game was its first win against Stanford.

== Schedule ==
Date	Opponent	Site	Result	Attendance
October 1	vs. Olympic Club	Recreation Park; San Francisco, CA	W 17–0	
October 8	Washington Volunteers	Berkeley, CA	W 4–0	
October 13	Washington Volunteers	Berkeley, CA	W 44–0	
October 15	vs. Olympic Club	Recreation Park; San Francisco, CA	W 18–0	
October 18	Kansas Volunteers	Berkeley, CA	W 33–0	
October 31	Iowa Volunteers	Berkeley, CA	T 0–0	
November 4	Saint Mary's	Berkeley, CA	W 51–0	
November 12	vs. Olympic Club	Recreation Park; San Francisco, CA	T 5–5	
November 24	vs. Stanford	Recreation Park; San Francisco, CA (Big Game)	W 22–0	20,000
December 26	at Multnomah Athletic Club	Portland, OR	W 27–0	
