= 1898 Denver Ministers football team =

American college football season

1898 Denver Pioneers football
- Conference: Independent
- Record: 6–4–1
- Head coach: None

1898 Far West college football independents records
	Conf.			Overall
Team	W	L	T	W		L		T
San Jose Normal		–		5	–	0	–	1
California		–		8	–	0	–	2
Nevada State		–		4	–	1	–	0
USC		–		5	–	1	–	1
Gonzaga		–		1	–	0	–	1
Oregon		–		3	–	1	–	0
New Mexico A&M		–		2	–	1	–	0
Utah		–		2	–	1	–	0
Stanford		–		5	–	3	–	1
Montana		–		3	–	2	–	0
Saint Mary's		–		3	–	2	–	0
Denver		–		6	–	4	–	1
Washington		–		1	–	1	–	0
Oregon Agricultural		–		1	–	2	–	1
Washington Agricultural		–		0	–	0	–	1
Utah Agricultural		–		0	–	1	–	0
Montana Agricultural		–		0	–	2	–	0
Pacific (CA)		–		0	–	0	–	2
Wyoming		–		0	–	4	–	0

The 1898 Denver Pioneers football team was an American football team that represented the University of Denver as an independent during the 1898 college football season. The team compiled a 6–4–1 record and was outscored by a total of 121 to 78. The team's Thanksgiving Day victory over Wyoming was the program's first game against an opponent from outside the State of Colorado.

== Schedule ==
Date	Opponent	Site	Result	Source
	Littleton Athletic Club		W 17–0	
	Denver Athletic Club		L 6–11	
	Denver East High School		W 18–0	
	Denver Athletic Club		L 0–6	
	Denver North High School		W 12–0	
	Denver Athletic Club		W 15–6	
	Denver Wheel Club		W 5–0	
November 8	Colorado Mines		L 0–33	
	Denver Wheel Club		T 0–0	
November 24	at Wyoming	Laramie, WY	W 5–0	
	Colorado College		L 0–65	
