= 1898 San Jose Normal football team =

American college football season

1898 San Jose Normal football
- Conference: Independent
- Record: 5–0–1
- Head coach: Thad McKay (1st season)
- Home stadium: Cyclers' Park

1898 Far West college football independents records
	Conf.			Overall
Team	W	L	T	W		L		T
San Jose Normal		–		5	–	0	–	1
California		–		8	–	0	–	2
Nevada State		–		4	–	1	–	0
USC		–		5	–	1	–	1
Gonzaga		–		1	–	0	–	1
Oregon		–		3	–	1	–	0
New Mexico A&M		–		2	–	1	–	0
Utah		–		2	–	1	–	0
Stanford		–		5	–	3	–	1
Montana		–		3	–	2	–	0
Saint Mary's		–		3	–	2	–	0
Denver		–		6	–	4	–	1
Washington		–		1	–	1	–	0
Oregon Agricultural		–		1	–	2	–	1
Washington Agricultural		–		0	–	0	–	1
Utah Agricultural		–		0	–	1	–	0
Montana Agricultural		–		0	–	2	–	0
Pacific (CA)		–		0	–	0	–	2
Wyoming		–		0	–	4	–	0

The 1898 San Jose Normal football team represented California State Normal School—now known as San Jose State University—as an independent during the 1898 college football season. In its first and only year under head coach Thad McKay, San Jose Normal compiled the program's first undefeated record at 5–0–1. Many other milestones characterized the 1898 season, including the program's first shutout, and intercollegiate win, and their first season in which they participated in multiple games.

== Schedule ==
Date	Time	Opponent	Site	Result	Source
		Pacific (CA)	Cyclers' Park; San Jose, CA (rivalry)	W 18–0	
October 22		Alameda High School	Cyclers' Park; San Jose, CA	W 29–5	
October 29		vs. San José High School	Cyclers' Park; San Jose, CA	T 6–6	
November 5		Oakland High School	Cyclers' Park; San Jose, CA	W 16–0	
November 19		Stockton High School	Cyclers' Park; San Jose, CA	W 6–0	
November 26	10:00 a.m.	at Lowell High School	Recreation Park; San Francisco, CA	W 11–6	
