= 1898 Stanford football team =

American college football season

1898 Stanford football
- Conference: Independent
- Record: 5–3–1
- Head coach: Harry P. Cross (2nd season)

1898 Far West college football independents records
	Conf.			Overall
Team	W	L	T	W		L		T
San Jose Normal		–		5	–	0	–	1
California		–		8	–	0	–	2
Nevada State		–		4	–	1	–	0
USC		–		5	–	1	–	1
Gonzaga		–		1	–	0	–	1
Oregon		–		3	–	1	–	0
New Mexico A&M		–		2	–	1	–	0
Utah		–		2	–	1	–	0
Stanford		–		5	–	3	–	1
Montana		–		3	–	2	–	0
Saint Mary's		–		3	–	2	–	0
Denver		–		6	–	4	–	1
Washington		–		1	–	1	–	0
Oregon Agricultural		–		1	–	2	–	1
Washington Agricultural		–		0	–	0	–	1
Utah Agricultural		–		0	–	1	–	0
Montana Agricultural		–		0	–	2	–	0
Pacific (CA)		–		0	–	0	–	2
Wyoming		–		0	–	4	–	0

The 1898 Stanford football team represented Stanford University in the 1898 college football season and was coached by Harry P. Cross in the second of his two nonconsecutive seasons with the team. He also coached the 1896 team. Stanford suffered its first Big Game loss to California, a 22–0 shutout.

== Schedule ==
Date	Opponent	Site	Result	Source
September 30	Washington Volunteers	Stanford, CA	W 22–0	
October 5	Kansas Volunteers	Stanford, CA	W 10–0	
October 8	at Olympic Club	Recreation Park; San Francisco, CA	W 22–0	
October 14	Kansas Volunteers	Stanford, CA	W 15–11	
October 20	Iowa Volunteers	Stanford, CA	L 0–6	
October 28	League of the Cross	Stanford, CA	W 18–5	
November 5	at Olympic Club	Recreation Park; San Francisco, CA	T 6–6	
November 8	at Olympic Club	Recreation Park; San Francisco, CA	L 0–12	
November 24	vs. California	Recreation Park; San Francisco, CA (rivalry)	L 0–22	
