= 1898 Nevada State Sagebrushers football team =

American college football season

1898 Nevada State Sagebrushers football
- Conference: Independent
- Record: 4–1
- Head coach: F. F. Ellis (1st season)
- Home stadium: Evans Field

1898 Far West college football independents records
	Conf.			Overall
Team	W	L	T	W		L		T
San Jose Normal		–		5	–	0	–	1
California		–		8	–	0	–	2
Nevada State		–		4	–	1	–	0
USC		–		5	–	1	–	1
Gonzaga		–		1	–	0	–	1
Oregon		–		3	–	1	–	0
New Mexico A&M		–		2	–	1	–	0
Utah		–		2	–	1	–	0
Stanford		–		5	–	3	–	1
Montana		–		3	–	2	–	0
Saint Mary's		–		3	–	2	–	0
Denver		–		6	–	4	–	1
Washington		–		1	–	1	–	0
Oregon Agricultural		–		1	–	2	–	1
Washington Agricultural		–		0	–	0	–	1
Utah Agricultural		–		0	–	1	–	0
Montana Agricultural		–		0	–	2	–	0
Pacific (CA)		–		0	–	0	–	2
Wyoming		–		0	–	4	–	0

The 1898 Nevada State Sagebrushers football team was an American football team that represented Nevada State University (now known as the University of Nevada, Reno) as an independent during the 1898 college football season. In its first and only season under head coach F. F. Ellis, the team compiled a 4–1 record.

== Schedule ==
Date	Time	Opponent	Site	Result	Source
October 15		Stewart Indian School (NV)	Evans Field; Reno, NV	W 34–6	
October 25	3:00 p.m.	at Santa Clara	Santa Clara, CA	L 6–12	
October 28		vs. Pacific (CA)	Cyclers' Park; San Jose, CA	W 35–0	
November 12		Belmont Academy (OR)	Evans Field; Reno, NV	W 24–0	
November 26		Stanford second team	Evans Field; Reno, NV	W 22–0	
