= Frank Shively =

American football coach, sprinter (1875–1943)

Biographical details
- Born: November 1875; Crow Agency, Montana, U.S.
- Died: June 14, 1943 (aged 67); Billings, Montana, U.S.

Coaching career (HC unless noted)
- 1898–1899: Washington Agricultural

Head coaching record
- Overall: 1–1–1

Frank Samuel Shively (November 1875 – June 14, 1943) was an American college football coach, sprinter, and Indian reservation administrator. He served as the head football coach at Washington Agricultural College and School of Science—now known as Washington State University—from 1898 to 1899, compiling a record of 1–1–1. Shively was a Native American of the Crow people.

Shively was born in 1875, at Crow Agency, Montana, to Mr. and Mrs. Samuel Shively. He later moved to Hardin, Montana. Shively was a graduate of the Carlisle Indian Industrial School. While he coached at Washington State, he worked as a stenographer at the Nez Perce agency in Lapwai, Idaho. Shively was also an accomplished sprinter, competing in the 100-yard dash.

Shively attended a business college in Philadelphia. He later worked at the chief clerk of the Crow Indian Reservation. Shively married Lucy Hawk on January 25, 1903, in Billings, Montana. Hawk was also a Crow and a graduate of the Carlisle Indian Industrial School. She died in 1915, at Crow Agency. Shively died of pneumonia, on June 14, 1943, at a hospital in Billings.

== Head coaching record ==
Year	Team	Overall	Conference	Standing	Bowl/playoffs
Washington Agricultural (Independent) (1898–1899)
1898	Washington Agricultural	0–0–1			
1899	Washington Agricultural	1–1			
Washington Agricultural:		1–1–1			
Total:		1–1–1			
