= Samuel Dunning =

American college football coach

Biographical details
- Born: May 10, 1859; New York, U.S.
- Died: April 19, 1915 (aged 55); San Francisco, California, U.S.
- Education: USMA (1880)

Coaching career (HC unless noted)
- 1898: Utah Agricultural

Head coaching record
- Overall: 0–1

Samuel Wadsworth Dunning (May 10, 1859 – April 19, 1915) was an American college football coach and military tactics instructor. He was an 1880 graduate of the United States Military Academy at West Point, New York.

He served as the head football coach at Utah State University–then known as Utah Agricultural College–in 1898, where he was also serving as an instructor of military science and tactics while stationed at Fort Douglas, Utah.

== Head coaching record ==
Year	Team	Overall	Conference	Standing	Bowl/playoffs
Utah Agricultural Aggies (Independent) (1898)
1898	Utah Agricultural	0–1			
Utah Agricultural:		0–1			
Total:		0–1			
