= 2018 Nevada Wolf Pack football team =

American college football season

2018 Nevada Wolf Pack football

Arizona Bowl champion

Arizona Bowl, W 16–13^{OT} vs. Arkansas State
- Conference: Mountain West Conference
- West Division
- Record: 8–5 (5–3 MW)
- Head coach: Jay Norvell (2nd season)
- Offensive coordinator: Matt Mumme (2nd season)
- Offensive scheme: Air raid
- Defensive coordinator: Jeff Casteel (2nd season)
- Base defense: 3–3–5
- Home stadium: Mackay Stadium

2018 Mountain West Conference football standings
	Conf.			Overall
Team	W		L	W		L
Mountain Division
No. 23 Boise State x	7	–	1	10	–	3
No. 22 Utah State	7	–	1	11	–	2
Wyoming	4	–	4	6	–	6
Air Force	3	–	5	5	–	7
Colorado State	2	–	6	3	–	9
New Mexico	1	–	7	3	–	9
West Division
No. 18 Fresno State x$	7	–	1	12	–	2
Nevada	5	–	3	8	–	5
Hawaii	5	–	3	8	–	6
San Diego State	4	–	4	7	–	6
UNLV	2	–	6	4	–	8
San Jose State	1	–	7	1	–	11
Championship: Fresno State 19, Boise State 16 (OT)
$ – Conference champion; x – Division champion/co-champions; y – Championship game participant; Rankings from AP Poll

The 2018 Nevada Wolf Pack football team represented the University of Nevada, Reno in the 2018 NCAA Division I FBS football season. The Wolf Pack were led by second–year head coach Jay Norvell and played their home games at Mackay Stadium. They were members of the West Division of the Mountain West Conference. They finished the season 8–5 and 5–3 in Mountain West play to finish in a tie for second place in the West division.

== Preseason ==
=== Award watch lists ===
Listed in the order that they were released

Award	Player	Position	Year
Rimington Trophy	Sean Krepsz	C	SR
Chuck Bednarik Award	Malik Reed	LB	SR
Maxwell Award	Ty Gangi	QB	SR
Doak Walker Award	Kelton Moore	RB	JR
Fred Biletnikoff Award	McLane Mannix	WR	SO
Bronko Nagurski Trophy	Malik Reed	LB	SR
Outland Trophy	Sean Krepsz	C	SR
Paul Hornung Award	McLane Mannix	WR/KR	SO
Wuerffel Trophy	Ty Gangi	QB	SR
Ray Guy Award	Quinton Conway	P	JR
Ted Hendricks Award	Korey Rush	DE	SR
Johnny Unitas Golden Arm Award	Ty Gangi	QB	SR
Manning Award	Ty Gangi	QB	SR
Earl Campbell Tyler Rose Award	Kelton Moore	RB	JR
Earl Campbell Tyler Rose Award	McLane Mannix	WR	SO

=== Mountain West media days ===
The Mountain West media days were held on July 24–25, 2018, at the Cosmopolitan in Paradise, Nevada.

==== Media poll ====
The preseason poll was released on July 24, 2018. The Wolf Pack were predicted to finish in fourth place in the MW West Division.

==== Preseason All–Mountain West Team ====
The Wolf Pack had three players selected to the preseason All–Mountain West Team; one from the offense and two from the defense.

Offense

McLane Mannix – WR

Defense

Malik Reed – LB

Dameon Baber – DB

== Schedule ==
Date	Time	Opponent	Site	TV	Result	Attendance
August 31	6:00 p.m.	Portland State (Div. I FCS)*	Mackay Stadium; Reno, NV		W 72–19	17,525
September 8	9:00 a.m.	at Vanderbilt*	Vanderbilt Stadium; Nashville, TN	SECN	L 10–41	25,676
September 15	4:00 p.m.	Oregon State*	Mackay Stadium; Reno, NV	ESPNU	W 37–35	20,462
September 22	9:00 a.m.	at Toledo*	Glass Bowl; Toledo, OH	CBSSN	L 44–63	23,675
September 29	12:00 p.m.	at Air Force	Falcon Stadium; Colorado Springs, CO	ESPNews	W 28–25	23,707
October 6	7:30 p.m.	Fresno State	Mackay Stadium; Reno, NV	ESPNU	L 3–21	15,367
October 13	7:30 p.m.	Boise State^{†}	Mackay Stadium; Reno, NV (rivalry)	CBSSN	L 27–31	21,431
October 20	9:00 p.m.	at Hawaii	Aloha Stadium; Honolulu, HI	KAME-TV/Stadium/SPEC HI	W 40–22	24,475
October 27	7:30 p.m.	San Diego State	Mackay Stadium; Reno, NV	ESPNU	W 28–24	14,545
November 10	7:30 p.m.	Colorado State	Mackay Stadium; Reno, NV	ESPNU	W 49–10	13,755
November 17	12:00 p.m.	at San Jose State	CEFCU Stadium; San Jose, CA	ESPN3	W 21–12	12,271
November 24	6:30 p.m.	at UNLV	Sam Boyd Stadium; Whitney, NV (Battle for the Fremont Cannon / Silver State Series)	CBSSN	L 29–34	19,921
December 29	10:15 a.m.	vs. Arkansas State*	Arizona Stadium; Tucson, AZ (Arizona Bowl)	CBSSN	W 16–13 ^{OT}	32,368
*Non-conference game; ^{†}Homecoming; All times are in Pacific time

== Personnel ==
2018 Nevada Wolf Pack football team roster
Players
Coaches
Offense

Pos.	#	Name	Class
RB	2	Devonte Lee	Fr
WR	3	Kaleb Fossum	Jr
WR	4	Elijah Cooks	So
RB	5	Jaxson Kincaide	Jr
QB	6	Ty Gangi (C)	Sr
WR	7	Romeo Doubs	Fr
QB	8	Kaymen Cureton	So
QB	10	Griffin Dahn	So
QB	12	Carson Strong	Fr
QB	13	Cristian Solano	Jr
WR	14	Dominic Christian	Jr
TE	15	Trevion Armstrong	So
WR	17	Brendan O'Leary–Orange	Jr
WR	18	Reese Neville	So
WR	19	Cole Turner	Fr
WR	20	Robert Ferrell	So
RB	22	Russell Booze	So
RB	23	Kelton Moore	Jr
RB	25	Roger Neal	So
TE	31	Reagan Roberson	So
TE	33	Crishaun Lappin	Fr
RB	35	Toa Taua	Fr
TE	40	Daniel Grzesiak	Fr
TE	43	Hayden Werbeckes	Fr
TE	44	Kori Collons	Jr
TE	49	Trae Carter–Wells	Sr
OL	54	Jermaine Ledbetter	So
OL	56	Kalei Meyer	Sr
OL	60	Dylan Porter	Fr
OL	61	Alex Tancreto	So
OL	62	Anthony Palomares	Sr
OL	64	Sean Krepsz	Sr
OL	65	Aaron Frost	Fr
OL	67	Gray Davis	Fr
OL	70	Nathan Edwards	So
OL	71	Jake Nelson	Jr
OL	72	Miles Beach	So
OL	73	Christopher Love	Fr
OL	74	Kevin Spencer	So
OL	75	Jack Bolduc	Fr
OL	76	Nate Brown	So
OL	77	Trey Hamilton	Fr
OL	79	Moses Landis	So
TE	80	Jacob Drahos	So
WR	81	Theo Goodwin	Fr
WR	82	Ian Zamudio	Fr
TE	84	Jake Ramsay	So
WR	85	Ben Putman	Jr
TE	86	Ryan Brocks	Jr
TE	87	Alex Pourdanesh	Fr
WR	88	Dru Jacobs	Fr

Defense

Pos.	#	Name	Class
DB	2	Asauni Rufus	Sr
DB	3	Berdale Robins	So
DB	4	E.J. Muhammad	Jr
DB	5	Dameon Baber	Sr
LB	7	Gabriel Sewell	Jr
LB	8	James Fotofili	Fr
DB	9	Justin Brent	Sr
LB	10	Lamin Touray	Fr
DB	11	Daiyan Henley	So
DB	12	Anthony Hankins	Sr
DB	13	Jordan Lee	Fr
DB	14	Mar'Quette Jackson	So
DB	15	Jaden Dedman	Fr
LB	16	Maliek Broady	Jr
DB	17	Teyjohn Herrington	Fr
DB	18	Emany Johnson	Fr
DB	19	Daylon Johnson	So
DB	20	Tyson Williams	Fr
DB	23	Jomon Dotson	Sr
LB	24	Lucas Weber	Sr
DB	25	Daniel Brown	Jr
DB	28	Austin Arnold	So
DB	29	Isaiah Hamilton	So
LB	30	Lawson Hall	So
LB	32	Giovanni Miranda	Fr
DB	33	JoJuan Claiborne	Fr
LB	34	Josiah Bradley	Fr
LB	36	Tyler Crandall	Jr
LB	37	Anthony Allen	Fr
DB	37	Daylon Johnson	So
LB	38	Jack Powers	Fr
DE	43	Fanon Vines	So
LB	45	Trevor Price	Fr
DE	47	Kameron Toomer	So
LB	50	Erick Kroll	So
DT	51	Dom Peterson	Fr
LB	52	Kyle Adams	Jr
DE	53	Zak Mahannah	Jr
DT	54	Chris Green	So
LB	55	Alec Bonsall	Jr
LB	56	Sheldon Wilkinson	Fr
DE	57	Jaden Lewis	Fr
LB	58	Ryan Madole	Fr
DE	63	Amir Johnson	Fr
DL	69	Sam Hammond	So
DT	78	Jarius McDade	Sr
DL	80	Jacob Drahos	So
LB	90	Malik Reed	Sr
DE	91	Adam Lopez	Jr
DE	92	Kaleb Meder	Jr
DB	94	Jack Leonetti	Fr
DT	96	Hausia Sekona	Jr
DE	98	Sam Hammond	So
DE	99	Korey Rush	Sr

Special teams

Pos.	#	Name	Class
PK	26	Ramiz Ahmed	Sr
P	35	Quinton Conaway	Jr
LS	39	Austin Ortega	Fr
LS	42	Wes Farnsworth	Sr
P	46	Eric Fellenzer	Fr
PK	48	Spencer Pettit	Jr
LS	69	Karson Thomas	Fr

Head coach

- Jay Norvell

Coordinators/assistant coaches

- Angus McClure – Assistant head coach/offensive line
- Matt Mumme – Offensive coordinator/quarterbacks
- Jeff Casteel – Defensive coordinator/linebackers
- Mike Chamoures – Safeties
- Timmy Chang – Inside receivers
- Jason Kaufusi – Defensive line
- David Lockwood – Secondary
- Tommy Perry – Special teams
- Eric Scott – Wide receivers
- David White – Running backs/recruiting
- Alec Drudi – Defensive analyst
- John Landwehr – Graduate assistant (Defense)
- Jaden Sawyer – Graduate assistant (Defense)
- Chad Savage – Graduate assistant (Offense)
- Gunnar White – Graduate assistant (Offense)

Support staff

- Vince Hug – Director of football operations
- Alex Collins – Director of player personnel and recruiting
- Vai Taua – Assistant director of player personnel and recruiting
- Jordon Simmons – Director of football strength and conditioning
- Jarwarski Beckum – Assistant director of football strength and conditioning
- Zach Higginbotham – Assistant football strength and conditioning coach
- Chad Hartley – Associate Athletic Director, Marketing and Communications (Football)
- Clayton Webb – Offensive quality control
- Jimbo Davis – Defensive quality control
- Ben Bezilla – Special teams quality control

Legend

- (C) Team captain
- (S) Suspended
- (I) Ineligible
- Injured
- Redshirt

Roster
Last update: February 8, 2021

== Game summaries ==
=== Portland State ===
Portland State at Nevada

Team	1	2	3	4	Total
Vikings (Div. I FCS)	9	10	0	0	19
• Wolf Pack	9	21	28	14	72

- Date: August 31, 2018
- Location: Mackay Stadium
  Reno, NV
- Game start: 6:06 p.m. PDT
- Elapsed time: 3 hours and 36 minutes
- Game attendance: 17,525
- Game weather: Temperature: 79 °F (26 °C) • Weather: Clear and Sunny • Wind: N 10 MPH
- Referee: Dwayne Johnson
- TV announcers (None): None

Scoring summary
1	12:07	PSU	Charlie Taumoepeau 48–yard pass from Davis Alexander (Cody Williams kick) (7 plays, 75 yards, 2:53)	PSU 7–0
1	04:06	PSU	Semise Kofe 1–yard safety	PSU 9–0
1	03:38	NEV	Daniel Brown 42–yard interception (Team kick blocked)	PSU 9–6
1	00:00	NEV	Ramiz Ahmed 46–yard field goal (4 plays, 3 yards, 1:17)	TIE 9–9
2	13:16	NEV	McLane Mannix 58–yard pass from Ty Gangi (Ramiz Ahmed kick) (1 play, 58 yards, 0:07)	NEV 16–9
2	04:52	NEV	Devonte Lee 14–yard run (Ramiz Ahmed kick) (5 plays, 84 yards, 1:51)	NEV 23–9
2	04:39	NEV	Charlie Taumoepeau 75–yard pass from Davis Alexander (Cody Williams kick) (1 play, 75 yards, 0:13)	NEV 23–16
2	00:59	NEV	McLane Mannix 18–yard pass from Ty Gangi (Ramiz Ahmed kick) (10 plays, 75 yards, 3:40)	NEV 30–16
2	00:05	PSU	Cody Williams 31–yard field goal (7 plays, 61 yards, 0:59)	NEV 30–19
3	13:16	NEV	Kelton Moore 9–yard run (Ramiz Ahmed kick) (4 plays, 76 yards, 1:40)	NEV 37–19
3	11:34	NEV	Jaxson Kincaide 73–yard pass from Toa Taua (Ramiz Ahmed kick) (1 play, 73 yards, 0:11)	NEV 44–19
3	08:36	NEV	McLane Mannix 47–yard pass from Ty Gangi (Ramiz Ahmed kick) (4 plays, 62 yards, 1:27)	NEV 51–19
3	06:46	NEV	Ty Gangi 5–yard run (Ramiz Ahmed kick) (3 plays, 39 yards, 0:38)	NEV 58–19
4	09:33	NEV	Cristian Solano 9–yard run (Ramiz Ahmed kick) (6 plays, 83 yards, 2:30)	NEV 65–19
4	06:48	NEV	Romeo Doubs 80–yard punt return (Ramiz Ahmed kick)	NEV 72–19

Statistics	Portland State	Nevada
First downs	17	25
Total yards	348	636
Rushing yards	107	216
Passing yards	241	420
Turnovers	1	1
Time of possession	35:28	24:32

Team	Category	Player	Statistics
Portland State	Passing	Davis Alexander	13/32, 224 yards, 2 TDs, 1 INT
Portland State	Rushing	Darian Green	10 carries, 37 yards
Portland State	Receiving	Charlie Taumoepeau	3 receptions, 130 yards, 2 TDs
Nevada	Passing	Ty Gangi	16/26, 342 yards, 3 TDs, 1 INT
Nevada	Rushing	Toa Taua	8 carries, 56 yards
Nevada	Receiving	Kaleb Fossum	6 receptions, 139 yards

=== At Vanderbilt ===
Nevada at Vanderbilt

Team	1	2	3	4	Total
Wolf Pack	0	10	0	0	10
• Commodores	0	17	17	7	41

- Date: September 8, 2018
- Location: Vanderbilt Stadium
  Nashville, TN
- Game start: 9:01 a.m. PDT
- Elapsed time: 3 hours and 19 minutes
- Game attendance: 25,676
- Game weather: Temperature: 84 °F (29 °C) • Weather: Partly Cloudy • Wind: S 8 MPH
- Referee: Chris Snead
- TV announcers (SECN): Dave Neal (play–by–play), D. J. Shockley (analyst) and Dawn Davenport (sideline)

Scoring summary
2	13:16	VANDY	Kalija Lipscomb 2–yard pass from Kyle Shurmur (Ryley Guay kick) (7 plays, 53 yards, 2:41)	VANDY 7–0
2	12:24	VANDY	Ke'Shawn Vaughn 7–yard run (Ryley Guay kick) (2 plays, 7 yards, 0:15)	VANDY 14–0
2	05:41	NEV	Ramiz Ahmed 32–yard field goal (7 plays, 13 yards, 3:17)	VANDY 14–3
2	03:13	VANDY	Ryley Guay 35–yard field goal (7 plays, 48 yards, 2:28)	VANDY 17–3
2	00:49	NEV	Brendan O'Leary-Orange 9–yard pass from Ty Gangi (Ramiz Ahmed kick) (10 plays, 75 yards, 2:24)	VANDY 17–10
3	07:14	VANDY	Ryley Guay 25–yard field goal (11 plays, 77 yards, 6:17)	VANDY 20–10
3	06:17	VANDY	Ke'Shawn Vaughn 46–yard run (Ryley Guay kick) (1 play, 46 yards, 0:11)	VANDY 27–10
3	00:23	VANDY	Kalija Lipscomb 11–yard pass from Kyle Shurmur (Ryley Guay kick) (8 plays, 73 yards, 4:00)	VANDY 34–10
4	01:10	VANDY	Josh Crawford 1–yard run (Ryley Guay kick) (3 plays, 21 yards, 1:40)	VANDY 41–10

Statistics	Nevada	Vanderbilt
First downs	14	25
Total yards	250	468
Rushing yards	34	198
Passing yards	216	270
Turnovers	5	4
Time of possession	23:58	36:02

Team	Category	Player	Statistics
Nevada	Passing	Ty Gangi	22/39, 216 yards, 1 TD, 2 INTs
Nevada	Rushing	Toa Taua	6 carries, 24 yards
Nevada	Receiving	McLane Mannix	6 receptions, 86 yards
Vanderbilt	Passing	Kyle Shurmur	23/32, 258 yards, 2 TDs
Vanderbilt	Rushing	Ke'Shawn Vaughn	11 carries, 93 yards, 2 TDs
Vanderbilt	Receiving	Jared Pinkney	4 receptions, 98 yards

=== Oregon State ===
Oregon State at Nevada

Team	1	2	3	4	Total
Beavers	7	14	0	14	35
• Wolf Pack	16	14	0	7	37

- Date: September 15, 2018
- Location: Mackay Stadium
  Reno, NV
- Game start: 4:00 p.m. PDT
- Elapsed time: 3 hours and 45 minutes
- Game attendance: 20,462
- Game weather: Temperature: 71 °F (22 °C) • Weather: Partly Cloudy • Wind: Moderate
- Referee: Jay Edwards
- TV announcers (ESPNU): Trey Bender (play–by–play) and Tyoka Jackson (analyst)

Scoring summary
1	12:00	NEV	Toa Taua 5–yard run (Ramiz Ahmed kick) (8 plays, 75 yards, 3:00)	NEV 7–0
1	08:15	OSU	Isaiah Hodgins 5–yard pass from Conor Blount (Jordan Choukair kick) (10 plays, 75 yards, 3:45)	TIE 7–7
1	02:17	NEV	Ramiz Ahmed 26–yard field goal (14 plays, 66 yards, 5:58)	NEV 10–7
1	00:01	NEV	McLane Mannix 24–yard pass from Ty Gangi (Ramiz Ahmed kick failed) (3 plays, 26 yards, 1:08)	NEV 16–7
2	12:33	NEV	Jaxson Kincaide 9–yard pass from Ty Gangi (Ramiz Ahmed kick) (2 plays, 29 yards, 0:31)	NEV 23–7
2	10:18	NEV	Malik Reed 48–yard fumble recovery (Ramiz Ahmed kick)	NEV 30–7
2	04:12	OSU	Jermar Jefferson 2–yard run (Jordan Choukair kick) (7 plays, 39 yards, 2:32)	NEV 30–14
2	00:22	OSU	Isaiah Hodgins 3–yard pass from Jake Luton (Jordan Choukair kick) (14 plays, 87 yards, 3:01)	NEV 30–21
4	11:40	OSU	Jermar Jefferson 1–yard run (Jordan Choukair kick) (5 plays, 42 yards, 1:47)	NEV 30–28
4	09:13	NEV	Kelton Moore 1–yard run (Ramiz Ahmed kick) (6 plays, 75 yards, 2:27)	NEV 37–28
4	04:40	OSU	Kase Rogers 1–yard run (Jordan Choukair kick) (4 plays, 40 yards, 1:01)	NEV 37–35

Statistics	Oregon State	Nevada
First downs	28	17
Total yards	540	357
Rushing yards	81	156
Passing yards	459	201
Turnovers	2	1
Time of possession	34:47	25:13

Team	Category	Player	Statistics
Oregon State	Passing	Jake Luton	23/35, 284 yards, 1 TD, 1 INT
Oregon State	Rushing	Jermar Jefferson	25 carries, 106 yards, 2 TDs
Oregon State	Receiving	Isaiah Hodgins	14 receptions, 200 yards, 2 TDs
Nevada	Passing	Ty Gangi	17/35, 195 yards, 2 TDs, 1 INT
Nevada	Rushing	Toa Taua	12 carries, 81 yards, 1 TD
Nevada	Receiving	McLane Mannix	5 receptions, 85 yards, 1 TD

=== At Toledo ===
Nevada at Toledo

Team	1	2	3	4	Total
Wolf Pack	7	17	14	6	44
• Rockets	14	21	14	14	63

- Date: September 22, 2018
- Location: Glass Bowl
  Toledo, OH
- Game start: 9:02 a.m. PDT
- Elapsed time: 3 hours and 55 minutes
- Game attendance: 23,675
- Game weather: Temperature: 59 °F (15 °C) • Weather: Cloudy Skies • Wind: NE 9 MPH
- Referee: Kevin Boitmann
- TV announcers (CBSSN): Ben Holden (play–by–play) and Ross Tucker (analyst)

Scoring summary
1	11:33	TOLEDO	Jon'Vea Johnson 38–yard pass from Mitchell Guadagni (Jameson Vest kick) (4 plays, 52 yards, 0:55)	TOLEDO 7–0
1	06:44	NEV	Ty Gangi 1–yard run (Ramiz Ahmed kick) (12 plays, 75 yards, 4:49)	TIE 7–7
1	03:07	TOLEDO	Reggie Gilliam 9–yard blocked punt return (Jameson Vest kick)	TOLEDO 14–7
2	14:56	NEV	Elijah Cooks 22–yard pass from Ty Gangi (Ramiz Ahmed kick) (3 plays, 15 yards, 1:31)	TIE 14–14
2	14:43	TOLEDO	Diontae Johnson 98–yard kickoff return (Jameson Vest kick)	TOLEDO 21–14
2	09:24	NEV	Toa Taua 31–yard run (Ramiz Ahmed kick) (6 plays, 93 yards, 1:49)	TIE 21–21
2	06:08	TOLEDO	Cody Thompson 4–yard pass from Mitchell Guadagni (Jameson Vest kick) (9 plays, 67 yards, 3:14)	TOLEDO 28–21
2	00:17	TOLEDO	Mitchell Guadagni 27–yard run (Jameson Vest kick) (6 plays, 41 yards, 1:14)	TOLEDO 35–21
2	00:00	NEV	Ramiz Ahmed 50–yard field goal (2 plays, 19 yards, 0:14)	TOLEDO 35–24
3	14:15	NEV	Kelton Moore 23–yard run (Ramiz Ahmed kick) (3 plays, 75 yards, 0:45)	TOLEDO 35–31
3	10:26	TOLEDO	Diontae Johnson 26–yard run from Mitchell Guadagni (Jameson Vest kick) (8 plays, 75 yards, 3:49)	TOLEDO 42–31
3	10:11	NEV	Toa Taua 66–yard run (Ramiz Ahmed kick) (1 play, 66 yards, 0:10)	TOLEDO 42–38
3	01:27	TOLEDO	Cody Thompson 20–yard pass from Mitchell Guadagni (Jameson Vest kick) (7 plays, 68 yards, 2:30)	TOLEDO 49–38
4	11:49	TOLEDO	Cody Thompson 19–yard pass from Desmond Phillips (Jameson Vest kick) (5 plays, 65 yards, 1:55)	TOLEDO 56–38
4	08:04	NEV	Toa Taua 2–yard run (Ty Gangi pass failed) (11 plays, 75 yards, 3:45)	TOLEDO 56–44
4	07:26	TOLEDO	Mitchell Guadagni 34–yard run (Jameson Vest kick) (2 plays, 39 yards, 0:37)	TOLEDO 63–44

Statistics	Nevada	Toledo
First downs	27	23
Total yards	582	460
Rushing yards	262	230
Passing yards	320	230
Turnovers	2	3
Time of possession	30:12	29:48

Team	Category	Player	Statistics
Nevada	Passing	Ty Gangi	29/50, 320 yards, 1 TD, 1 INT
Nevada	Rushing	Toa Taua	15 carries, 170 yards, 3 TDs
Nevada	Receiving	Kaleb Fossum	15 receptions, 147 yards
Toledo	Passing	Mitchell Guadagni	15/24, 211 yards, 4 TDs
Toledo	Rushing	Mitchell Guadagni	15 carries, 131 yards, 2 TDs
Toledo	Receiving	Diontae Johnson	4 receptions, 67 yards, 1 TD

=== At Air Force ===
Nevada at Air Force

Team	1	2	3	4	Total
• Wolf Pack	7	14	7	0	28
Falcons	0	7	10	8	25

- Date: September 29, 2018
- Location: Falcon Stadium
  Colorado Springs, CO
- Game start: 12:01 p.m. PDT
- Elapsed time: 3 hours and 15 minutes
- Game attendance: 23,707
- Game weather: Temperature: 74 °F (23 °C) • Weather: Hazy • Wind: SSW 10 MPH
- Referee: Cooper Castleberry
- TV announcers (ESPNews): Doug Sherman (play–by–play) and Dustin Fox (analyst)

Scoring summary
1	10:15	NEV	Elijah Cooks 40–yard pass from Ty Gangi (Ramiz Ahmed kick) (10 plays, 75 yards, 4:45)	NEV 7–0
2	09:58	AF	Zane Lewis 99–yard interception (Jake Koehnke kick)	TIE 7–7
2	06:52	NEV	McLane Mannix 29–yard pass from Ty Gangi (Ramiz Ahmed kick) (7 plays, 80 yards, 3:01)	NEV 14–7
2	00:27	NEV	Brendan O'Leary-Orange 30–yard pass from Ty Gangi (Ramiz Ahmed kick) (4 plays, 40 yards, 0:43)	NEV 21–7
3	11:13	AF	Jake Koehnke 43–yard field goal (9 plays, 49 yards, 3:47)	NEV 21–10
3	09:32	NEV	Elijah Cooks 23–yard pass from Ty Gangi (Ramiz Ahmed kick) (5 plays, 75 yards, 1:41)	NEV 28–10
3	03:36	AF	Marcus Bennett 2–yard pass from Donald Hammond III (Jake Koehnke kick) (12 plays, 58 yards, 5:07)	NEV 28–17
4	06:48	AF	Donald Hammond III 9–yard run (rush failed) (11 plays, 67 yards, 4:27)	NEV 28–23
4	00:17	AF	Team 6–yard safety	NEV 28–25

Statistics	Nevada	Air Force
First downs	19	16
Total yards	436	250
Rushing yards	177	154
Passing yards	259	96
Turnovers	2	4
Time of possession	31:07	28:53

Team	Category	Player	Statistics
Nevada	Passing	Ty Gangi	24/33, 259 yards, 4 TDs, 1 INT
Nevada	Rushing	Toa Taua	13 carries, 76 yards
Nevada	Receiving	Elijah Cooks	2 receptions, 63 yards, 2 TDs
Air Force	Passing	Donald Hammond III	6/15, 71 yards, 1 TD
Air Force	Rushing	Kadin Remsberg	13 carries, 71 yards
Air Force	Receiving	Marcus Bennett	4 receptions, 52 yards, 1 TD

=== Fresno State ===
Fresno State at Nevada

Team	1	2	3	4	Total
• Bulldogs	0	7	7	7	21
Wolf Pack	0	3	0	0	3

- Date: October 6, 2018
- Location: Mackay Stadium
  Reno, NV
- Game start: 7:35 p.m. PDT
- Elapsed time: 3 hours
- Game attendance: 15,367
- Game weather: Temperature: 52 °F (11 °C) • Weather: Cold and Rainy • Wind: N 10 MPH
- Referee: Stephen Baron
- TV announcers (ESPNU): Mike Corey (play–by–play) and Rene Ingoglia (analyst)

Scoring summary
2	13:11	FS	Ronnie Rivers 19–yard pass from Marcus McMaryion (Asa Fuller kick) (9 plays, 69 yards, 4:09)	FS 7–0
2	08:00	NEV	Ramiz Ahmed 41–yard field goal (11 plays, 51 yards, 5:11)	FS 7–3
3	10:20	FS	Ronnie Rivers 2–yard run (Asa Fuller kick) (5 plays, 80 yards, 2:05)	FS 14–3
4	08:28	FS	KeeSean Johnson 27–yard pass from Marcus McMaryion (Asa Fuller kick) (4 plays, 44 yards, 1:50)	FS 21–3

Statistics	Fresno State	Nevada
First downs	12	21
Total yards	271	327
Rushing yards	30	132
Passing yards	241	195
Turnovers	2	1
Time of possession	24:34	35:26

Team	Category	Player	Statistics
Fresno State	Passing	Marcus McMaryion	20/28, 241 yards, 2 TDs
Fresno State	Rushing	Ronnie Rivers	5 carries, 12 yards, 1 TD
Fresno State	Receiving	Jared Rice	3 receptions, 98 yards
Nevada	Passing	Cristian Solano	22/43, 195 yards, 3 INTs
Nevada	Rushing	Cristian Solano	23 carries, 71 yards
Nevada	Receiving	Kaleb Fossum	12 receptions, 97 yards

=== Boise State ===
Boise State at Nevada
(rivalry)

Team	1	2	3	4	Total
• Broncos	7	10	14	0	31
Wolf Pack	10	7	10	0	27

- Date: October 13, 2018
- Location: Mackay Stadium
  Reno, NV
- Game start: 7:37 p.m. PDT
- Elapsed time: 3 hours and 38 minutes
- Game attendance: 21,431
- Game weather: Temperature: 60 °F (16 °C) • Weather: Breezy and Cold • Wind: NNE 9 MPH
- Referee: Cal McNeill
- TV announcers (CBSSN): Rich Waltz (play–by–play), Aaron Murray (analyst) and Cassie McKinney (sideline)

Scoring summary
1	11:44	NEV	Ramiz Ahmed 35–yard field goal (9 plays, 58 yards, 3:16)	NEV 3–0
1	06:25	BSU	John Hightower 88–yard run (Haden Hoggarth kick) (1 play, 88 yards, 0:12)	BSU 7–3
1	02:17	NEV	Jaxson Kincaide 21–yard run (Ramiz Ahmed kick) (2 plays, 44 yards, 0:31)	NEV 10–7
2	13:49	BSU	Tyler Horton 99–yard interception (Hadden Hoggarth kick)	BSU 14–10
2	00:42	NEV	Elijah Cooks 11–yard pass from Ty Gangi (Ramiz Ahmed kick) (5 plays, 35 yards, 0:49)	NEV 17–14
2	00:00	BSU	Haden Hoggarth 31–yard field goal (7 plays, 55 yards, 0:37)	TIE 17–17
3	10:12	BSU	C. T. Thomas 36–yard pass from Brett Rypien (Haden Hoggarth kick) (10 plays, 75 yards, 4:48)	BSU 24–17
3	06:51	NEV	McLane Mannix 50–yard pass from Ty Gangi (Ramiz Ahmed kick) (9 plays, 77 yards, 3:14)	TIE 24–24
3	05:37	BSU	A. J. Richardson 41–yard pass from Brett Rypien (Haden Hoggarth kick) (3 plays, 69 yards, 1:06)	BSU 31–24
3	01:21	NEV	Ramiz Ahmed 28–yard field goal (12 plays, 56 yards, 4:11)	BSU 31–27

Statistics	Boise State	Nevada
First downs	24	23
Total yards	506	386
Rushing yards	207	82
Passing yards	299	304
Turnovers	2	5
Time of possession	35:09	24:51

Team	Category	Player	Statistics
Boise State	Passing	Brett Rypien	28/38, 299 yards, 2 TDs, 3 INTs
Boise State	Rushing	John Hightower	2 carries, 90 yards, 1 TD
Boise State	Receiving	A. J. Richardson	4 receptions, 79 yards, 1 TD
Nevada	Passing	Ty Gangi	24/42, 304 yards, 2 TDs, 1 INT
Nevada	Rushing	Kelton Moore	8 carries, 35 yards
Nevada	Receiving	McLane Mannix	4 receptions, 109 yards, 1 TD

=== At Hawaii ===
Nevada at Hawaii

Team	1	2	3	4	Total
• Wolf Pack	10	10	6	14	40
Rainbow Warriors	14	0	0	8	22

- Date: October 20, 2018
- Location: Aloha Stadium
  Honolulu, HI
- Game start: 6:07 p.m.
- Elapsed time: 3 hours and 14 minutes
- Game attendance: 24,475
- Game weather: Temperature: 79 °F (26 °C) • Weather: Mostly Clear • Wind: NNE 12 MPH
- Referee: Eddy Shelton
- TV announcers (KAME-TV/Stadium/SPEC HI): Robert Kekaula (play–by–play), Rich Miano (analyst), Scott Robbs (sideline) and Alex Margulies (sideline)

Scoring summary
1	07:11	UH	Cedric Byrd 8–yard pass from Cole McDonald (Ryan Meskell kick) (3 plays, 28 yards, 1:11)	UH 7–0
1	04:14	NEV	Ramiz Ahmed 23–yard field goal (6 plays, 37 yards, 2:56)	UH 7–3
1	02:06	NEV	Elijah Cooks 29–yard pass from Ty Gangi (Ramiz Ahmed kick) (3 plays, 60 yards, 1:15)	NEV 10–7
1	00:00	UH	John Ursua 70–yard pass from Cole McDonald (Ryan Meskell kick) (5 plays, 85 yards, 2:00)	UH 14–10
2	11:00	NEV	Ramiz Ahmed 27–yard field goal (11 plays, 39 yards, 4:00)	UH 14–13
2	06:24	NEV	Devonte Lee 5–yard run (Ramiz Ahmed kick) (5 plays, 51 yards, 2:06)	NEV 20–13
3	09:18	NEV	Elijah Cooks 40–yard run (Ty Gangi pass failed) (8 plays, 80 yards, 3:15)	NEV 26–14
4	10:33	NEV	Toa Taua 13–yard run (Ramiz Ahmed kick) (9 plays, 81 yards, 4:27)	NEV 33–14
4	03:15	UH	JoJo Ward 2–yard pass from Cole McDonald (Marcus Brown-Armstrong pass) (9 plays, 80 yards, 3:48)	NEV 33–22
4	00:59	NEV	Devonte Lee 6–yard run (Ramiz Ahmed kick) (4 plays, 24 yards, 2:08)	NEV 40–22

Statistics	Nevada	Hawaii
First downs	25	16
Total yards	481	371
Rushing yards	220	112
Passing yards	261	259
Turnovers	8	1
Time of possession	30:45	29:15

Team	Category	Player	Statistics
Nevada	Passing	Ty Gangi	21/29, 247 yards, 1 TD
Nevada	Rushing	Toa Taua	18 carries, 126 yards, 1 TD
Nevada	Receiving	Kaleb Fossum	6 receptions, 86 yards
Hawaii	Passing	Cole McDonald	19/37, 259 yards, 3 TDs
Hawaii	Rushing	Dayton Furuta	16 carries, 55 yards
Hawaii	Receiving	John Ursua	7 receptions, 123 yards, 1 TD

=== San Diego State ===
San Diego State at Nevada

Team	1	2	3	4	Total
Aztecs	14	10	0	0	24
• Wolf Pack	9	6	10	3	28

- Date: October 27, 2018
- Location: Mackay Stadium
  Reno, NV
- Game start: 7:35 p.m. PDT
- Elapsed time: 3 hours and 25 minutes
- Game attendance: 14,545
- Game weather: Temperature: 68 °F (20 °C) • Weather: Mild • Wind: N 6 MPH
- Referee: Reggie Smith
- TV announcers (ESPNU): Roy Philpott (play–by–play) and Tom Ramsey (analyst)

Scoring summary
1	09:16	SDSU	Chase Jasmin 2–yard pass from Ryan Agnew (John Baron II kick) (12 plays, 75 yards, 5:44)	SDSU 7–0
1	04:41	SDSU	Kahale Warring 16–yard pass from Ryan Agnew (John Baron II kick) (8 plays, 80 yards, 3:45)	SDSU 14–0
1	02:12	NEV	Team -3–yard safety	SDSU 14–2
1	00:09	NEV	Toa Taua 40–yard pass from Ty Gangi (Ramiz Ahmed kick) (5 plays, 50 yards, 2:03)	SDSU 14–9
2	08:50	NEV	Brendan O'Leary-Orange 26–yard pass from Ty Gangi (Ramiz Ahmed kick failed) (6 plays, 53 yards, 2:28)	NEV 15–14
2	04:19	SDSU	John Baron II 26–yard field goal (11 plays, 73 yards, 4:27)	SDSU 17–15
2	01:31	SDSU	Kahale Warring 30–yard pass from Ryan Agnew (John Baron II kick) (3 plays, 63 yards, 1:14)	SDSU 24–15
3	11:39	NEV	Devonte Lee 2–yard run (Ramiz Ahmed kick) (8 plays, 75 yards, 3:21)	SDSU 24–22
3	05:13	NEV	Ramiz Ahmed 32–yard field goal (8 plays, 21 yards, 4:36)	NEV 25–24
4	08:54	NEV	Ramiz Ahmed 34–yard field goal (4 plays, 0 yards, 1:33)	NEV 28–24

Statistics	San Diego State	Nevada
First downs	24	14
Total yards	456	297
Rushing yards	173	62
Passing yards	283	235
Turnovers	4	0
Time of possession	31:33	28:27

Team	Category	Player	Statistics
San Diego State	Passing	Ryan Agnew	20/41, 283 yards, 3 TDs
San Diego State	Rushing	Chase Jasmin	16 carries, 85 yards
San Diego State	Receiving	Kahale Warring	6 receptions, 95 yards, 2 TDs
Nevada	Passing	Ty Gangi	23/43, 235 yards, 2 TDs
Nevada	Rushing	Devonte Lee	7 carries, 32 yards, 1 TD
Nevada	Receiving	Toa Taua	5 receptions, 76 yards, 1 TD

=== Colorado State ===
Colorado State at Nevada

Team	1	2	3	4	Total
Rams	0	0	0	10	10
• Wolf Pack	7	21	21	0	49

- Date: November 10, 2018
- Location: Mackay Stadium
  Reno, NV
- Game start: 7:35 p.m. PST
- Elapsed time: 3 hours and 22 minutes
- Game attendance: 13,755
- Game weather: Temperature: 46 °F (8 °C) • Weather: Cool • Wind: NE 8 MPH
- Referee: Kevin Hassell
- TV announcers (ESPNU): Roy Philpott (play–by–play) and Tom Ramsey (analyst)

Scoring summary
1	08:53	NEV	Romeo Doubs 20–yard pass from Ty Gangi (Ramiz Ahmed kick) (7 plays, 47 yards, 3:20)	NEV 7–0
2	09:03	NEV	Elijah Cooks 38–yard pass from Ty Gangi (Ramiz Ahmed kick failed) (5 plays, 61 yards, 2:04)	NEV 13–0
2	02:28	NEV	Devonte Lee 1–yard run (Elijah Cooks pass) (5 plays, 65 yards, 1:07)	NEV 21–0
2	01:02	NEV	Romeo Doubs 36–yard pass from Ty Gangi (Ramiz Ahmed kick) (3 plays, 65 yards, 0:32)	NEV 28–0
3	11:34	NEV	Devonte Lee 1–yard run (Ramiz Ahmed kick) (9 plays, 86 yards, 3:21)	NEV 35–0
3	07:08	NEV	Jaxson Kincaide 7–yard run (Ramiz Ahmed kick) (7 plays, 94 yards, 2:30)	NEV 42–0
3	01:42	NEV	Kaleb Fossum 28–yard pass from Ty Gangi (Ramiz Ahmed kick) (4 plays, 54 yards, 1:55)	NEV 49–0
4	08:32	CSU	Preston Williams 8–yard pass from Collin Hill (Wyatt Bryan kick) (9 plays, 48 yards, 3:22)	NEV 49–7
4	04:21	CSU	Wyatt Bryan 32–yard field goal (9 plays, 42 yards, 2:01)	NEV 49–10

Statistics	Colorado State	Nevada
First downs	13	29
Total yards	260	636
Rushing yards	74	232
Passing yards	260	636
Turnovers	1	2
Time of possession	29:10	30:50

Team	Category	Player	Statistics
Colorado State	Passing	Collin Hill	23/40, 186 yards, 1 TD, 1 INT
Colorado State	Rushing	Izzy Matthews	8 carries, 36 yards
Colorado State	Receiving	Preston Williams	7 receptions, 69 yards, 1 TD
Nevada	Passing	Ty Gangi	28/35, 404 yards, 4 TDs
Nevada	Rushing	Toa Taua	12 carries, 83 yards
Nevada	Receiving	Romeo Doubs	8 receptions, 120 yards, 2 TDs

=== At San Jose State ===
Nevada at San Jose State

Team	1	2	3	4	Total
• Wolf Pack	0	7	7	7	21
Spartans	6	0	6	0	12

- Date: November 17, 2018
- Location: CEFCU Stadium
  San Jose, CA
- Game start: 12:06 p.m. PST
- Elapsed time: 2 hours and 58 minutes
- Game attendance: 12,271
- Game weather: Temperature: 56 °F (13 °C) • Weather: Hazy and Sunny • Wind: WNW 5 MPH
- Referee: Reggie Smith
- TV announcers (ESPN3): Trey Bender (play–by–play) and Al Groh (analyst)

Scoring summary
1	00:52	SJSU	Josh Oliver 1–yard pass from Michael Carrillo (Bryce Crawford kick failed) (1 play, 1 yard, 0:04)	SJSU 6–0
2	01:48	NEV	Ty Gangi 2–yard run (Spencer Pettit kick) (13 plays, 85 yards, 6:37)	NEV 7–6
3	12:21	NEV	Brendan O'Leary-Orange 9–yard pass from Ty Gangi (Spencer Pettit kick) (6 plays, 75 yards, 2:39)	NEV 14–6
3	03:24	SJSU	DeJon Packer 22–yard pass from Michael Carrillo (pass failed) (7 plays, 43 yards, 3:17)	NEV 14–12
4	12:38	NEV	Toa Taua 9–yard run (Spencer Pettit kick) (7 plays, 85 yards, 3:26)	NEV 21–12

Statistics	Nevada	San Jose State
First downs	24	11
Total yards	463	200
Rushing yards	149	30
Passing yards	314	170
Turnovers	2	1
Time of possession	35:11	24:49

Team	Category	Player	Statistics
Nevada	Passing	Ty Gangi	19/32, 314 yards, 1 TD, 1 INT
Nevada	Rushing	Toa Taua	29 carries, 121 yards, 1 TD
Nevada	Receiving	Romeo Doubs	5 receptions, 105 yards
San Jose State	Passing	Michael Carrillo	17/26, 168 yards, 2 TDs, 1 INT
San Jose State	Rushing	Tyler Nevens	9 carries, 18 yards
San Jose State	Receiving	Tre Walker	4 receptions, 69 yards

=== At UNLV ===
Nevada at UNLV
(Battle for the Fremont Cannon / Silver State Series)

Team	1	2	3	4	Total
Wolf Pack	20	6	0	3	29
• Rebels	0	21	7	6	34

- Date: November 24, 2018
- Location: Sam Boyd Stadium
  Whitney, NV
- Game start: 6:32 p.m. PST
- Elapsed time: 3 hours and 23 minutes
- Game attendance: 19,921
- Game weather: Temperature: 53 °F (12 °C) • Weather: Clear • Wind: NE 3 MPH
- Referee: Cal McNeill
- TV announcers (CBSSN): Rich Waltz (play–by–play), Aaron Murray (analyst) and A.J. Ross (sideline)

Scoring summary
1	12:03	NEV	McLane Mannix 5–yard pass from Ty Gangi (Ramiz Ahmed kick) (4 plays, 79 yards, 1:18)	NEV 7–0
1	06:14	NEV	Cole Turner 24–yard pass from Ty Gangi (Ramiz Ahmed kick) (7 plays, 64 yards, 3:11)	NEV 14–0
1	00:46	NEV	Kelton Moore 46–yard run (Ramiz Ahmed kick failed) (7 plays, 80 yards, 2:17)	NEV 20–0
2	14:12	NEV	Ramiz Ahmed 29–yard field goal (4 plays, 6 yards, 1:24)	NEV 23–0
2	12:31	UNLV	Lexington Thomas 38–yard pass from Armani Rogers (Evan Pantels kick) (5 plays, 75 yards, 1:41)	NEV 23–7
2	09:47	UNLV	Giovanni Fauolo Sr. 18–yard pass from Armani Rogers (Evan Pantels kick) (6 plays, 72 yards, 2:36)	NEV 23–14
2	03:34	UNLV	Armani Rogers 1–yard run (Evan Pantels kick) (6 plays, 48 yards, 2:09)	NEV 23–21
2	00:36	NEV	Ramiz Ahmed 26–yard field goal (13 plays, 66 yards, 2:58)	NEV 26–21
3	04:46	UNLV	Noah Bean 1–yard pass from Armani Rogers (Evan Pantels kick) (11 plays, 87 yards, 4:53)	UNLV 28–26
4	11:21	NEV	Ramiz Ahmed 36–yard field goal (10 plays, 48 yards, 4:33)	NEV 29–28
4	02:34	UNLV	Armani Rogers 3–yard run (rush failed) (12 plays, 73 yards, 3:28)	UNLV 34–29

Statistics	Nevada	UNLV
First downs	19	22
Total yards	464	409
Rushing yards	169	226
Passing yards	295	183
Turnovers	0	2
Time of possession	29:17	30:43

Team	Category	Player	Statistics
Nevada	Passing	Ty Gangi	27/45, 295 yards, 2 TDs, 3 INTs
Nevada	Rushing	Kelton Moore	13 carries, 129 yards, 1 TD
Nevada	Receiving	Romeo Doubs	4 receptions, 72 yards
UNLV	Passing	Armani Rogers	13/20, 172 yards, 3 TDs
UNLV	Rushing	Xzaviar Campbell	9 carries, 65 yards
UNLV	Receiving	Giovanni Fauolo Sr.	4 receptions, 52 yards, 1 TD

=== Vs. Arkansas State (Arizona Bowl) ===
Arkansas State vs. Nevada
(Arizona Bowl)

Team	1	2	3	4	OT	Total
Red Wolves	0	7	0	3	3	13
• Wolf Pack	0	3	0	7	6	16

- Date: December 29, 2018
- Location: Arizona Stadium
  Tucson, AZ
- Game start: 10:15 a.m. PST
- Elapsed time: 3 hours and 54 minutes
- Game attendance: 32,368
- Game weather: Temperature: 43 °F (6 °C) • Weather: Clear • Wind: ENE 1 MPH
- Referee: Tom Stapleton
- TV announcers (CBSSN): Rich Waltz (play–by–play), Aaron Murray (analyst) and John Schriffen (sideline)

Scoring summary
2	05:09	NEV	Ramiz Ahmed 36–yard field goal (10 plays, 43 yards, 5:07)	NEV 3–0
2	03:08	ASU	Marcel Murray 2–yard run (Blake Grupe kick) (6 plays, 75 yards, 2:01)	ASU 7–3
4	01:06	NEV	Devonte Lee 1–yard run (Ramiz Ahmed kick) (10 plays, 74 yards, 2:39)	NEV 10–7
4	00:00	ASU	Blake Grupe 32–yard field goal (8 plays, 61 yards, 1:06)	TIE 10–10
OT	15:00	ASU	Blake Grupe 24–yard field goal (6 plays, 18 yards, 0:00)	ASU 13–10
OT	15:00	NEV	Reagan Roberson 11–yard pass from Ty Gangi (5 plays, 25 yards, 0:00)	NEV 16–13

Statistics	Arkansas State	Nevada
First downs	25	15
Total yards	499	285
Rushing yards	224	85
Passing yards	275	200
Turnovers	1	0
Time of possession	29:31	30:29

Team	Category	Player	Statistics
Arkansas State	Passing	Justice Hansen	26/46, 275 yards, 3 INTs
Arkansas State	Rushing	Warren Ward	16 carries, 140 yards
Arkansas State	Receiving	Omar Bayless	7 receptions, 129 yards
Nevada	Passing	Ty Gangi	18/34, 200 yards, 1 TD, 2 INTs
Nevada	Rushing	Toa Taua	22 carries, 56 yards
Nevada	Receiving	Ben Putman	4 receptions, 114 yards
