= Benjamin F. Searight =

American football player and coach (1873–1937)

Biographical details
- Born: May 20, 1873; Frankfort, Kentucky, U.S.
- Died: July 12, 1937 (aged 64); Adrian, Michigan, U.S.
- Education: William Jewell (A.B. 1895)

Playing career
- 1896: Stanford
- Position: Halfback

Coaching career (HC unless noted)
- 1898: Montana

Head coaching record
- Overall: 3–2

Benjamin Franklyn Searight (May 20, 1873 – July 12, 1937) was an American college football player and coach. He served as the head football coach at the University of Montana in 1898, compiling a record of 3–2. Searight was an 1895 graduate of William Jewell College in Liberty, Missouri. He started at left halfback for the Stanford University football team in 1898 as a postgraduate student, where he was also a member of Sigma Nu.

== Head coaching record ==
Year	Team	Overall	Conference	Standing	Bowl/playoffs
Montana (Independent) (1898)
1898	Montana	3–2			
Montana:		3–2			
Total:		3–2			
