= 2018 Arizona Bowl =

College football bowl game

2018 Nova Home Loans Arizona Bowl
- 4th Arizona Bowl
Arkansas State Red Wolves	Nevada Wolf Pack
(8–4)	(7–5)
Sun Belt	Mountain West
13	16
Head coach: Blake Anderson	Head coach: Jay Norvell
	1	2	3	4	OT	Total
Arkansas State	0	7	0	3	3	13
Nevada	0	3	0	7	6	16
- Date: December 29, 2018
- Season: 2018
- Stadium: Arizona Stadium
- Location: Tucson, Arizona
- MVP: Ty Gangi (QB, Nevada) & B. J. Edmonds (S, Arkansas State)
- Favorite: Arkansas State by 1.5
- Referee: Tom Stapleton (MAC)
- Attendance: 32,368
- Payout: US$413,000

United States TV coverage
- Network: CBSSN
- Announcers: Rich Waltz, Aaron Murray and John Schriffen

The 2018 Arizona Bowl was a college football bowl game played on December 29, 2018. It was the fourth edition of the Arizona Bowl, and one of the 2018–19 bowl games concluding the 2018 FBS football season. Sponsored by the Nova Home Loans mortgage broker company, the game was officially known as the Nova Home Loans Arizona Bowl.

== Teams ==
The game was played between Arkansas State from the Sun Belt Conference and Nevada from the Mountain West Conference. In prior games between the two programs, Nevada held a 3–2 lead in the series.

=== Arkansas State Red Wolves ===
On November 27, bowl organizers announced that Arkansas State would represent the Sun Belt Conference in the Arizona Bowl. The Red Wolves compiled an 8–4 record during the regular season, and were co-champion of the Sun Belt West Division along with the Louisiana Ragin' Cajuns, both of whom had 5–3 conference records.

=== Nevada Wolf Pack ===
Nevada received and accepted a bid to the Arizona Bowl on November 29. The Wolf Pack entered the bowl with a 7–5 record (5–3 in conference).

== Game summary ==
=== Scoring summary ===
Scoring summary

Quarter	Time	Drive			Team	Scoring information	Score	
Quarter	Time	Plays	Yards	TOP	Team	Scoring information	ARST	NEV
2	5:09	10	43	5:07	NEV	36-yard field goal by Ramiz Ahmed	0	3
2	3:08	6	75	2:01	ARST	Marcel Murray 2-yard touchdown run, Blake Grupe kick good	7	3
4	1:06	10	74	2:39	NEV	Devonte Lee 1-yard touchdown run, Ramiz Ahmed kick good	7	10
4	0:00	8	61	1:06	ARST	32-yard field goal by Blake Grupe	10	10
OT		6	18		ARST	24-yard field goal by Blake Grupe	13	10
OT		5	25		NEV	Reagan Roberson 11-yard touchdown reception from Ty Gangi	13	16
"TOP" = time of possession. For other American football terms, see Glossary of American football.							13	16

=== Statistics ===
	1	2	3	4	OT	Total
Red Wolves	0	7	0	3	3	13
Wolf Pack	0	3	0	7	6	16

Statistics	ARST	NEV
First downs	25	15
Plays–yards	93–499	74–285
Rushes–yards	47–224	40–85
Passing yards	275	200
Passing: comp–att–int	26–46–3	18–34–2
Time of possession	29:31	30:29

Team	Category	Player	Statistics
Arkansas State	Passing	Justice Hansen	26/46, 275 yds, 3 INT
Arkansas State	Rushing	Warren Wand	16 car, 140 yds
Arkansas State	Receiving	Omar Bayless	7 rec, 129 yds
Nevada	Passing	Ty Gangi	18/34, 200 yds, 1 TD, 2 INT
Nevada	Rushing	Toa Taua	22 car, 56 yds
Nevada	Receiving	Ben Putman	4 rec, 114 yds
