= Blair Business College =

Public college in Spokane, Washington, US

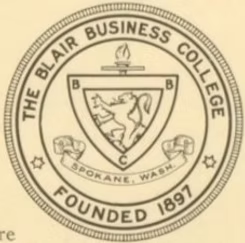
- Type: Public college
- Active: 1897–1933
- Students: 500 (1899)
- Location: Spokane, Washington, U.S. 47.6563°N 117.4278°W
- Colors: Old Gold, Royal Purple
- Mascot: Blairs

Blair Business College was a public college in Spokane, Washington.

== History ==
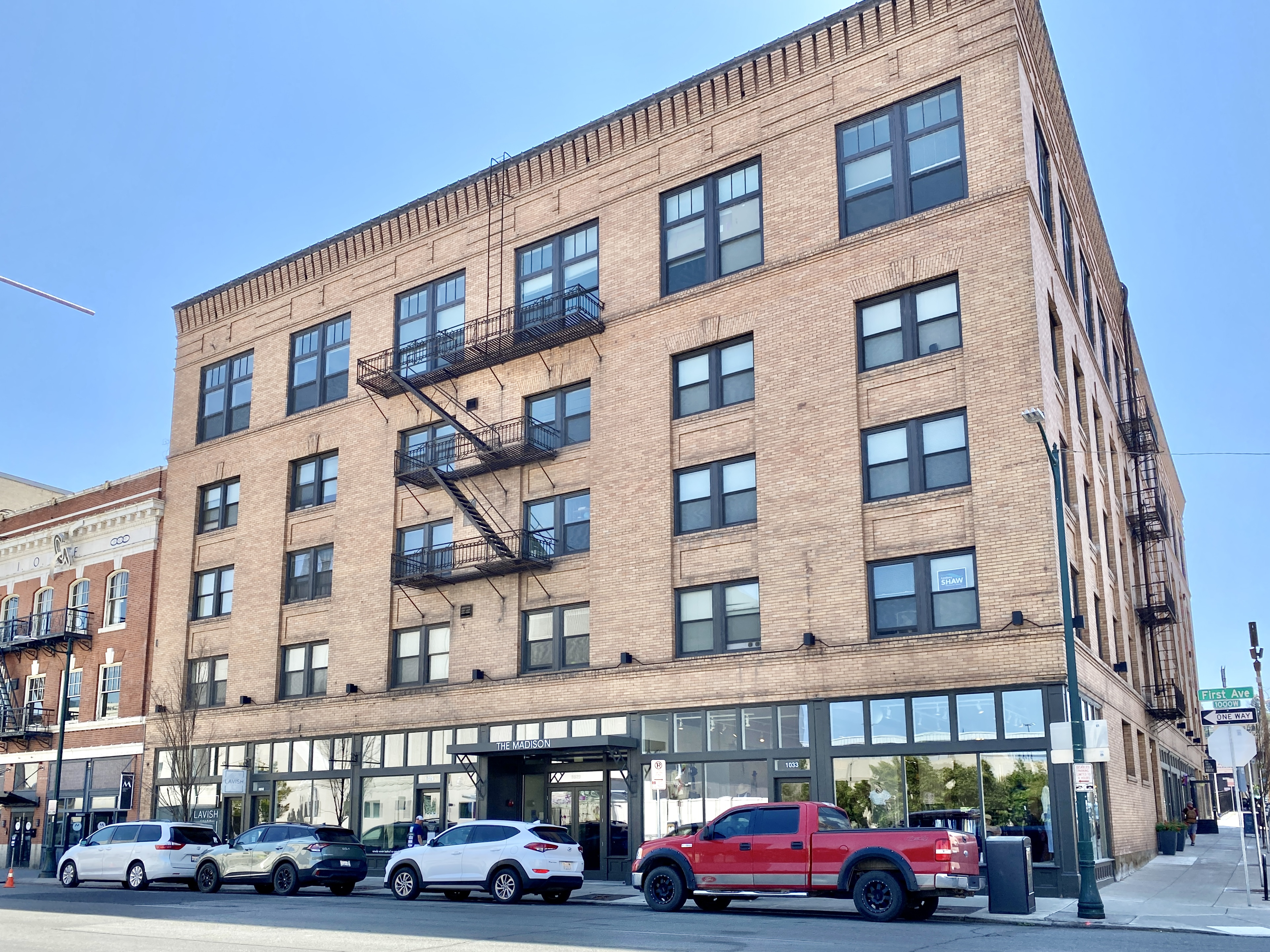
The New Madison Hotel, former site of Blair Business College, in 2023

In 1897, Hugh C. Blair left Spokane Business College to found Blair Business College. The school began in three rooms at the intersection of First Avenue and Post Street in downtown Spokane. In 1899, the college had 500 students.

Blair Business College moved to the second and third floors of the old Tull and Gibbs Furniture in 1902. In 1906, the school acquired a ten-year lease for the top floor (15 rooms) of the New Madison Hotel. The hotel is today part of the West Downtown Historic Transportation Corridor.

A 1915 ad for the college stated "Our sole business is training young men and women in the principles of business, so that they may be able to take their place in the world. . . prepared." The school had departments of shorthand, bookkeeping/business methods, penmanship, typewriting, and English.

In October 1933, at the height of the Great Depression, Blair Business College was merged into Northwestern University's School of Commerce.

A faded "Blair Business College" sign can still be seen on the building today.

== Athletics ==
Blair Business College played 12 years of college football, beginning in 1898. They had an all-time record of 15–18–9.

Blair also had baseball and basketball teams. The Spokesman-Review referred to the college's sports teams as the "Blairs".
