= F. F. Ellis =

American football coach

Biographical details
- Education: University of California, Berkeley

Coaching career (HC unless noted)
- 1898: Nevada State

Head coaching record
- Overall: 4–1

Frank F. Ellis was the third head football coach of the Sagebrushers (later known as the Wolf Pack) at Nevada State University—now known as the University of Nevada, Reno. His tenure, as with his predecessors, lasted one season.

Ellis, from the University of California, Berkeley, was brought in by the university to coach the 1898 season. Of five games scheduled, the 'Brushers won four for a win percentage of .800 (which would remain the best overall single-season win percentage until the 1919 team, under Ray Courtright, went 8–1–1). Included that year were wins over the Stanford second team (22–0), the University of the Pacific (35–0) and their old nemesis the Belmont Preparatory School (24–0).

== Head coaching record ==
| Year | Team | Overall | Conference | Standing | Bowl/playoffs |
|---|---|---|---|---|---|
Nevada State Sagebrushers (Independent) (1898)
| 1898 | Nevada State | 4–1 | | | |
| Nevada State: | | 4–1 | | | |
| Total: | | 4–1 | | | |
