= Gonzaga football, 1892–1898 =

American college football team

The earliest iterations of the Gonzaga football team represented Gonzaga College—now known as Gonzaga University—in American football competitions against other Spokane, Washington teams in the 1890s.

Gonzaga's team was originally formed to compete in a Thanksgiving Day game vs. the Spokane Amateur Athletic Club on November 24, 1892. The team was assembled and coached by Dr. Henry Luhn, a member of the S.A.A.C., who had recently arrived to Spokane from the East Coast. Luhn had been captain of the first Notre Dame football team as an undergraduate in 1887 and brought the game of American football to Spokane. Luhn also played as fullback for the Gonzaga eleven versus his club.

Through the decade Gonzaga played a number of games vs. Spokane High School, Spokane Business College, and Blair Business College. In this time period the team was tied twice but never defeated, and except for the first game in 1892 was never scored upon.

The college's faculty discontinued football for the 1899 season, citing the graduation of their strongest and most experienced players. Although inter-class competition continued within the school, Gonzaga would not play another intercollegiate game for nearly a decade.

== 1892 ==
1892 Gonzaga football
- Conference: Independent
- Record: 0–0–1
- Head coach: Henry Luhn (1st season)

=== Schedule ===
Date	Time	Opponent	Site	Result	Attendance	Source
November 24	2:00 p.m.	Spokane Amateur Athletic Club	Gonzaga grounds; Spokane, WA	T 4–4	500	

== 1893 ==
1893 Gonzaga football
- Conference: Independent
- Record: 0–0

Gonzaga did not play any known games in 1893. Several later sources include a supposed 16–0 Gonzaga win over Spokane High School, but this record appears to be in error. A game with the same participants and score did occur in 1895.

According to contemporary reports, the high school team did challenge Gonzaga to a game in late October. The Gonzaga team initially accepted the challenge, but by November had rescinded after discovering that their team's aggregate weight was 250 pounds less than the high school eleven's.

== 1894 ==
1894 Gonzaga football
- Conference: Independent

On December 5, The Spokesman-Review reported that the Gonzaga College football team had accepted a challenge to meet the Irving school "next Saturday".

=== Schedule ===
Date	Opponent	Site	Result	Source
December 8 or 15	Irving School	Spokane, WA	Unknown	

== 1895 ==
1895 Gonzaga football
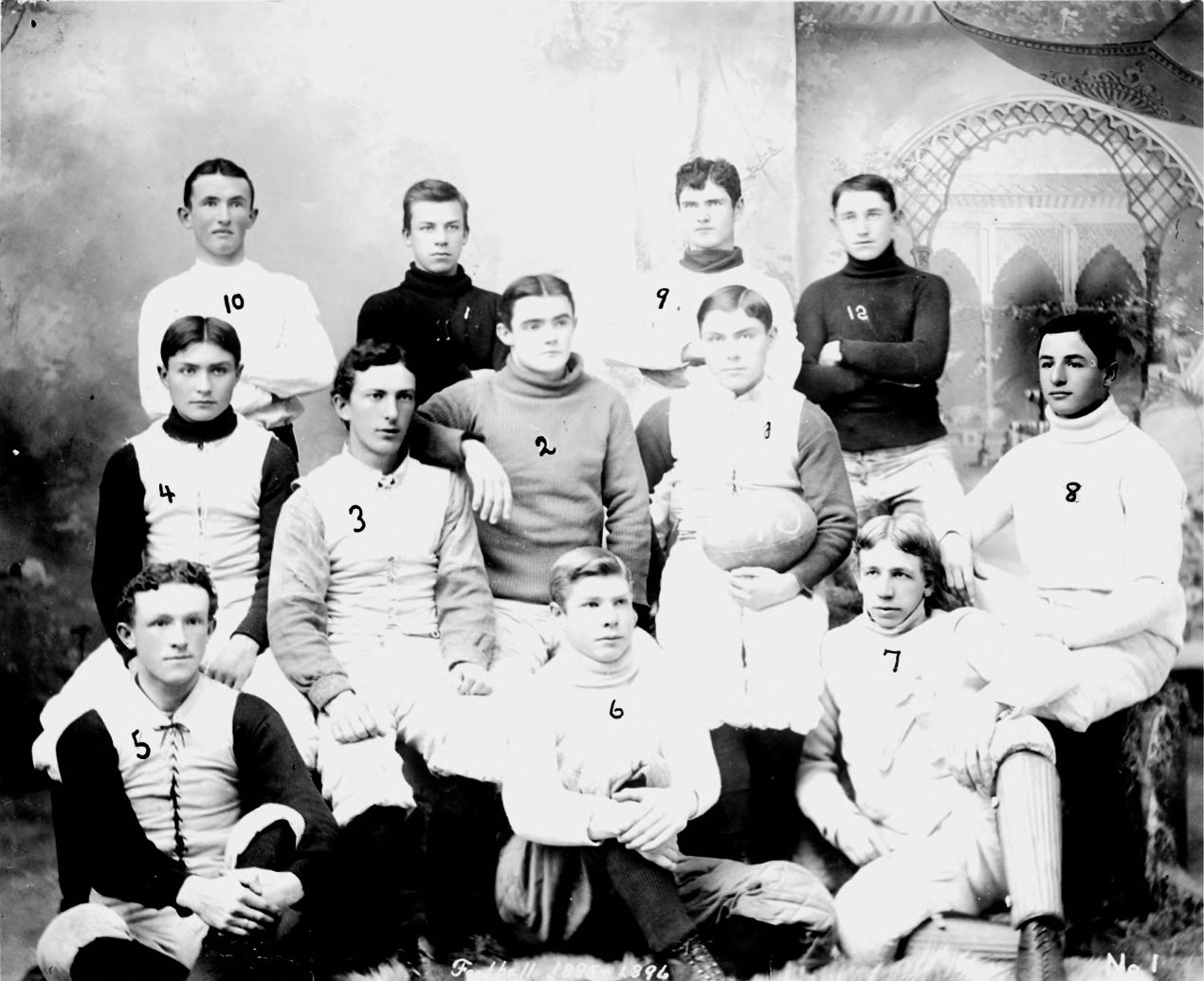
- Conference: Independent
- Record: 1–0
- Captain: Thomas O'Hanlon

=== Schedule ===
Date	Time	Opponent	Site	Result	Source
December 3	2:30 p.m.	Spokane High School	Gonzaga grounds; Spokane, WA	W 16–0	
December 21	2:00 p.m.	Spokane High School	Gonzaga grounds; Spokane, WA	Cancelled	

== 1896 ==
1896 Gonzaga football
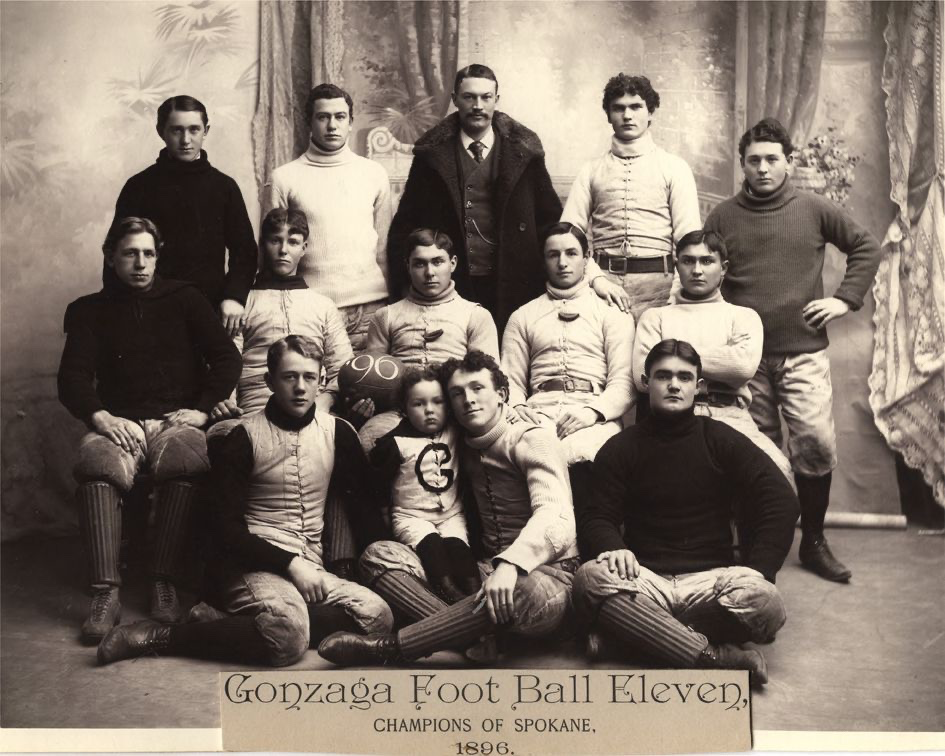

Champions of Spokane
- Conference: Independent
- Record: 2–0
- Head coach: Henry Luhn
- Captain: Thomas O'Hanlon

=== Schedule ===
Date	Time	Opponent	Site	Result	Attendance	Source
November 26	2:00 p.m.	Spokane High School	Gonzaga grounds; Spokane, WA	W 6–0	300	
January 1	2:30 p.m.	Spokane Business College	Gonzaga grounds; Spokane, WA	W 38–0		

== 1897 ==
1897 Gonzaga football
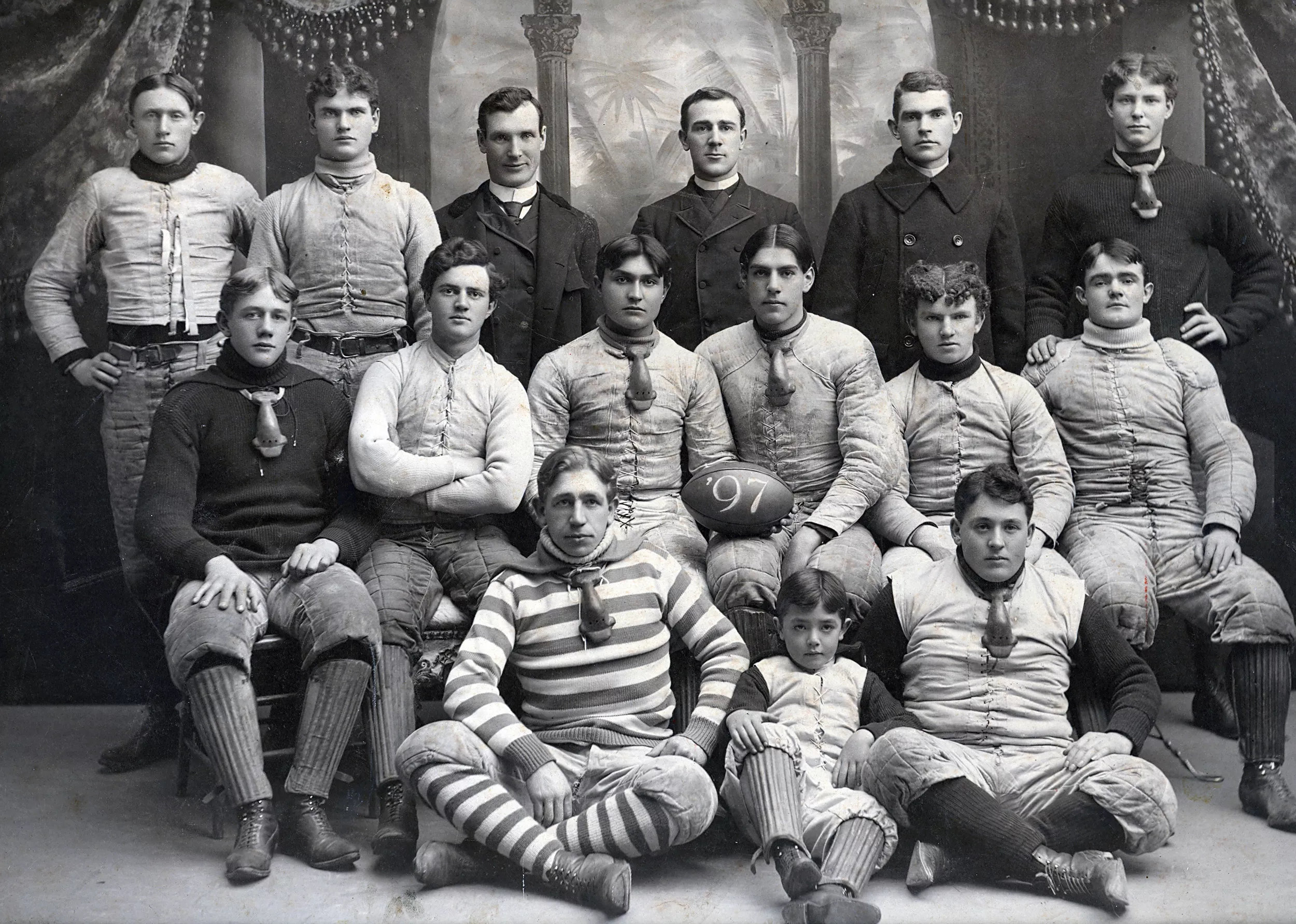

Champions of Spokane
- Conference: Independent
- Record: 1–0
- Captain: Henry O'Hanlon

In November, the Spokane Daily Chronicle reported that Gonzaga's administration had surveyed the pupils' parents on the question of if the game of football should be continued at the college.

The college did not participate in the city's annual Thanksgiving game, this year between the Spokane Amateur Athletic Club and Idaho, with the Gonzaga students instead staging a production of Guy Mannering.

=== Schedule ===
Date	Opponent	Site	Result	Attendance	Source
December 4	Spokane High School	Gonzaga grounds; Spokane, WA	W 8–0	500	

== 1898 ==
1898 Gonzaga football
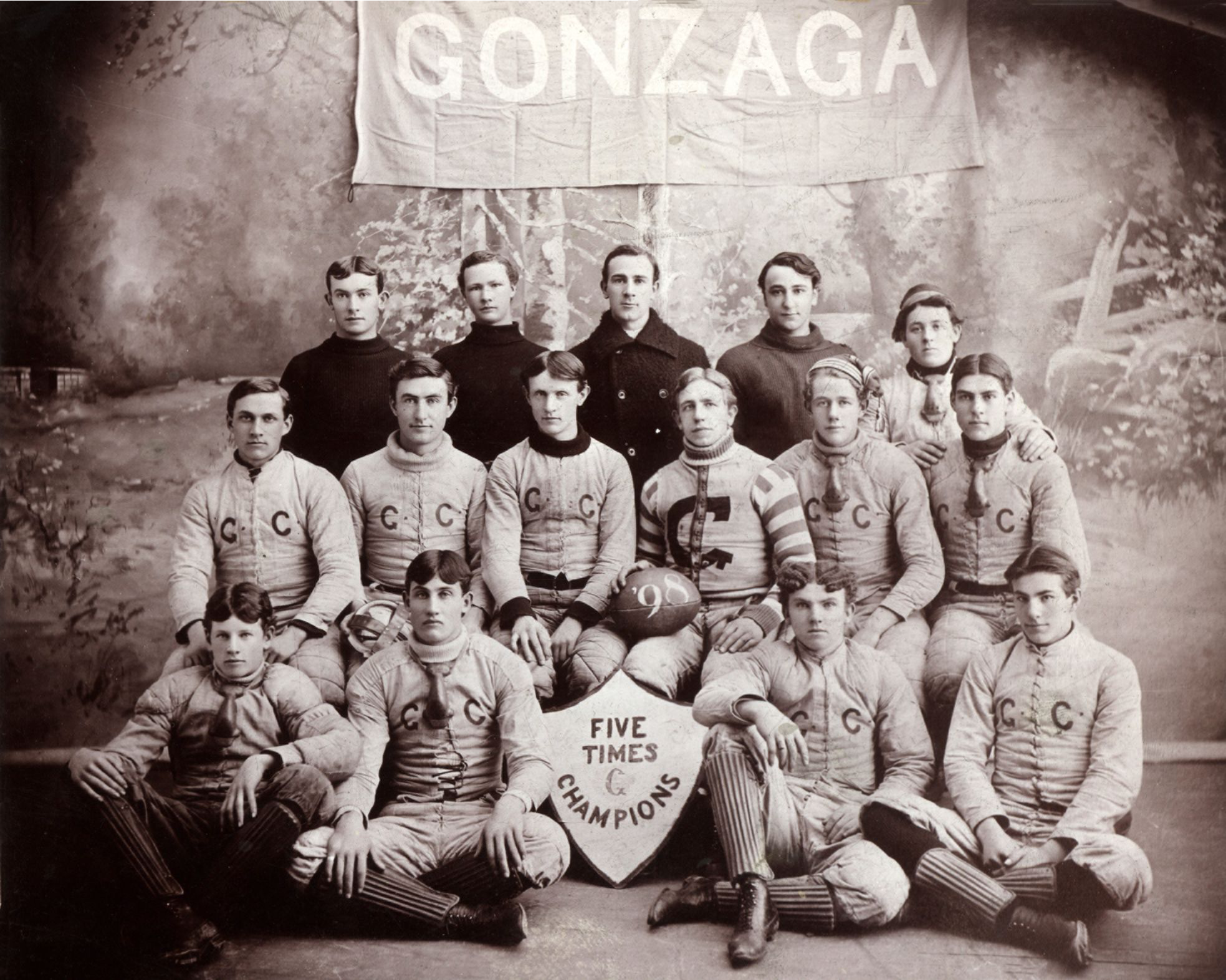

Champions of Spokane "Five Times Champions"
- Conference: Independent
- Record: 1–0–1
- Captain: John A. Oebbecke

The Gonzaga team was again unable to schedule a game for Thanksgiving, this year putting on the drama A Celebrated Case. Football captain John Oebbecke performed the roles "Lazere, a camp follower" and "Count de Mornay, returned from exile".

The football game was over twice as well-attended as the Gonzaga play.

=== Schedule ===
Date	Time	Opponent	Site	Result	Attendance	Source
December 10	2:30 p.m.	Blair Business College	Gonzaga field; Spokane, WA	T 0–0	500	
December 17	2:30 p.m.	Blair Business College	Gonzaga field; Spokane, WA	W 5–0		

== Football discontinued (1899–1907) ==
In October 1899, Gonzaga announced that the school would not be fielding a team for the season. The faculty cited the graduation of many of the previous year's strongest and most experienced players, but added that they hoped to find enough experienced players to raise a team for the 1900 season. Inter-class competition within the school continued, such as football games in which the "Poets and Rhetoricians" played the "Humanities, Commercials, and First Academic" team.
