= List of Washington Huskies football seasons =

The Washington Huskies football team competes in the National Collegiate Athletic Association (NCAA) Division I Football Bowl Subdivision, representing the University of Washington. Since 1959, the Huskies have competed as a charter member of the Pac-12 Conference, formerly known as the Athletic Association of Western Universities (AAWU), Pacific-8 Conference (Pac-8), and Pacific-10 Conference (Pac-10). From 1916 to 1958, the Huskies were members of the Pacific Coast Conference (PCC).

== Seasons ==
Year	Coach	Overall	Conference	Standing	Bowl/playoffs	Coaches^{#}	AP^{°}
Independent (1889–1890)
1889	No coach	0–1					
1890	No coach	0–0–1					
W. B. Goodwin (Independent) (1892–1893)
1892	W. B. Goodwin	1–1					
1893	W. B. Goodwin	1–3–1					
Charles Cobb (Independent) (1894)
1894	Charles Cobb	1–1–1					
Ralph Nichols (Independent) (1895–1896)
1895	Ralph Nichols	4–0–1					
1896	Ralph Nichols	2–3					
Carl L. Clemans (Independent) (1897)
1897	Carl L. Clemans	1–2					
Ralph Nichols (Independent) (1898)
1898	Ralph Nichols	1–1					
A. S. Jeffs (Independent) (1899)
1899	A. S. Jeffs	4–1–1					
J. S. Dodge (Independent) (1900)
1900	J. S. Dodge	1–2–2					
Jack Wright (Independent) (1901)
1901	Jack Wright	3–3					
James Knight (Northwest Intercollegiate Athletic Association) (1902–1904)
1902	James Knight	5–1	4–0	1st			
1903	James Knight	6–1	5–0	1st			
1904	James Knight	4–2–1	3–2				
Oliver Cutts (Independent) (1905)
1905	Oliver Cutts	5–2–2					
Victor M. Place (Independent) (1906–1907)
1906	Victor M. Place	4–1–4					
1907	Victor M. Place	4–4–2					
Gil Dobie (Northwest Conference) (1908–1915)
1908	Gil Dobie	6–0–1	3–0–1	1st			
1909	Gil Dobie	7–0	4–0	T–1st			
1910	Gil Dobie	6–0	4–0	1st			
1911	Gil Dobie	7–0	4–0	1st			
1912	Gil Dobie	6–0	4–0	1st			
1913	Gil Dobie	7–0	4–0	1st			
1914	Gil Dobie	6–0–1	3–0–1	1st			
1915	Gil Dobie	7–0	1–0	T–1st			
Gil Dobie (Northwest Conference, Pacific Coast Conference) (1916)
1916	Gil Dobie	6–0–1	2–0–1, 3–0	1st, 1st			
Claude J. Hunt (Northwest Conference, Pacific Coast Conference) (1917)
1917	Claude J. Hunt	1–2–1	1–1–1, 0–2–1	3rd, 5th			
Anthony Savage (Pacific Coast Conference) (1918)
1918	Anthony Savage	1–1	1–1	3rd			
Claude J. Hunt (Pacific Coast Conference) (1919)
1919	Claude J. Hunt	5–1	2–1	T–1st			
Stub Allison (Pacific Coast Conference) (1920)
1920	Stub Allison	1–5	0–3	6th			
Enoch Bagshaw (Pacific Coast Conference) (1921)
1921	Enoch Bagshaw	3–4–1	0–3–1	6th			
Enoch Bagshaw (Northwest Conference, Pacific Coast Conference) (1922–1925)
1922	Enoch Bagshaw	6–1–1	4–0–1, 4–1–1	T–1st, 3rd			
1923	Enoch Bagshaw	10–1–1	6–0, 4–1	1st, 2nd	T Rose		
1924	Enoch Bagshaw	8–1–1	5–1, 3–1–1	3rd, 4th			
1925	Enoch Bagshaw	10–1–1	5–0, 5–0	T–1st, 1st	L Rose		
Enoch Bagshaw (Pacific Coast Conference) (1926–1929)
1926	Enoch Bagshaw	8–2	3–2	5th			
1927	Enoch Bagshaw	9–2	4–2	4th			
1928	Enoch Bagshaw	7–4	2–4	8th			
1929	Enoch Bagshaw	2–6–1	0–5–1	10th			
James Phelan (Pacific Coast Conference) (1930–1941)
1930	James Phelan	5–4	3–4	5th			
1931	James Phelan	5–3–1	3–3–1	5th			
1932	James Phelan	6–2–2	3–2–2	4th			
1933	James Phelan	5–4	3–4	7th			
1934	James Phelan	6–1–1	5–1–1	3rd			
1935	James Phelan	5–3	4–3	6th			
1936	James Phelan	7–2–1	7–0–1	1st	L Rose		5
1937	James Phelan	7–2–2	4–2–2	3rd			
1938	James Phelan	3–5–1	3–4–1	6th			
1939	James Phelan	4–5	4–4	4th			
1940	James Phelan	7–2	7–1	2nd			10
1941	James Phelan	5–4	5–3	T–2nd			
Ralph Welch (Pacific Coast Conference) (1942–1947)
1942	Ralph Welch	4–3–3	3–3–2	6th			
1943	Ralph Welch	4–1	0–1	3rd	L Rose		12
1944	Ralph Welch	5–3	1–1	2nd			
1945	Ralph Welch	6–3	6–3	3rd			
1946	Ralph Welch	5–4	5–3	4th			
1947	Ralph Welch	3–6	2–5	T–7th			
Howard Odell (Pacific Coast Conference) (1948–1952)
1948	Howard Odell	2–7–1	2–5–1	7th			
1949	Howard Odell	3–7	2–5	T–6th			
1950	Howard Odell	8–2	6–1	2nd		15	11
1951	Howard Odell	3–6–1	1–5–1	7th			
1952	Howard Odell	7–3	6–2	3rd			
John Cherberg (Pacific Coast Conference) (1953–1955)
1953	John Cherberg	3–6–1	2–4–1	7th			
1954	John Cherberg	2–8	1–6	T–9th			
1955	John Cherberg	5–4–1	4–3–1	5th			
Darrell Royal (Pacific Coast Conference) (1956)
1956	Darrell Royal	5–5	4–4	T–4th			
Jim Owens (Pacific Coast Conference) (1957–1958)
1957	Jim Owens	3–6–1	3–4	7th			
1958	Jim Owens	3–7	1–6	8th			
Jim Owens (AAWU/Pac-8 Conference) (1959–1974)
1959	Jim Owens	10–1	6–1	T–1st	W Rose	7	8
1960	Jim Owens	10–1	7–0	1st	W Rose	5	6
1961	Jim Owens	5–4–1	2–1–1	T–2nd			
1962	Jim Owens	7–1–2	4–1	2nd		14	
1963	Jim Owens	6–5	4–1	1st	L Rose	15	
1964	Jim Owens	6–4	5–2	3rd			
1965	Jim Owens	5–5	4–3	4th			
1966	Jim Owens	6–4	4–3	4th			
1967	Jim Owens	5–5	3–4	T–3rd			
1968	Jim Owens	3–5–2	1–5–1	8th			
1969	Jim Owens	1–9	1–7	7th			
1970	Jim Owens	6–4	4–3	T–2nd			
1971	Jim Owens	8–3	4–3	T–3rd			19
1972	Jim Owens	8–3	4–3	T–3rd			
1973	Jim Owens	2–9	0–7	8th			
1974	Jim Owens	5–6	3–4	T–5th			
Don James (Pacific-8/Pacific-10 Conference) (1975–1992)
1975	Don James	6–5	5–2	T–3rd			
1976	Don James	5–6	3–4	T–4th			
1977	Don James	8–4 (Note: UCLA's and Mississippi State's wins over Washington were later forfeited due to ineligible players.)	6–1	1st	W Rose	9	10
1978	Don James	7–4	6–2	T–2nd			
1979	Don James	9–3 (Note: Arizona State's win over Washington was later forfeited due to ineligible players.)	5–2	2nd	W Sun	11	11
1980	Don James	9–3	6–1	1st	L Rose	17	16
1981	Don James	10–2	6–2	1st	W Rose	7	10
1982	Don James	10–2	6–2	2nd	W Aloha	7	7
1983	Don James	8–4	5–2	2nd	L Aloha		
1984	Don James	11–1	6–1	2nd	W Orange	2	2
1985	Don James	7–5	5–3	T–4th	W Freedom		
1986	Don James	8–3–1	5–2–1	T–2nd	L Sun	17	18
1987	Don James	7–4–1	4–3–1	T–2nd	W Independence		
1988	Don James	6–5	3–5	T–6th			
1989	Don James	8–4	5–3	T–2nd	W Freedom	20	23
1990	Don James	10–2	7–1	1st	W Rose	5	5
1991	Don James	12–0	8–0	1st	W Rose	1	2
1992	Don James	9–3	6–2	T–1st	L Rose	10	11
Jim Lambright (Pacific-10 Conference) (1993–1998)
1993	Jim Lambright	7–4	5–3	4th	Ineligible (Note: Washington was hit by sanctions from the Pac-10 Conference, which included a two-year bowl ban.)		
1994	Jim Lambright	7–4	4–4	5th	Ineligible		
1995	Jim Lambright	7–4–1	6–1–1	T–1st	L Sun		
1996	Jim Lambright	9–3	7–1	2nd	L Holiday	15	16
1997	Jim Lambright	8–4	5–3	4th	W Aloha	18	18
1998	Jim Lambright	6–6	4–4	T–5th	L Oahu		
Rick Neuheisel (Pacific-10 Conference) (1999–2002)
1999	Rick Neuheisel	7–5	6–2	2nd	L Holiday		
2000	Rick Neuheisel	11–1	7–1	T–1st	W Rose^{†}	3	3
2001	Rick Neuheisel	8–4	6–2	T–2nd	L Holiday	19	19
2002	Rick Neuheisel	7–6	4–4	T–4th	L Sun		
Keith Gilbertson (Pacific-10 Conference) (2003–2004)
2003	Keith Gilbertson	6–6	4–4	T–5th			
2004	Keith Gilbertson	1–10	0–8	10th			
Tyrone Willingham (Pacific-10 Conference) (2005–2008)
2005	Tyrone Willingham	2–9	1–7	10th			
2006	Tyrone Willingham	5–7	3–6	9th			
2007	Tyrone Willingham	4–9	2–7	10th			
2008	Tyrone Willingham	0–12	0–9	10th			
Steve Sarkisian (Pacific-10/Pac-12 Conference) (2009–2013)
2009	Steve Sarkisian	5–7	4–5	7th			
2010	Steve Sarkisian	7–6	5–4	T–3rd	W Holiday		
2011	Steve Sarkisian	7–6	5–4	3rd (North)	L Alamo		
2012	Steve Sarkisian	7–6	5–4	4th (North)	L Maaco		
2013	Steve Sarkisian (Note: Sarkisian was Washington's head coach for the 12 regular season games of the 2013 season, but resigned before the Fight Hunger Bowl. Marques Tuiasosopo was appointed interim head coach for the bowl game, which Washington won. The Huskies finished the season with an overall record of 9–4.)	9–4	5–4	3rd (North)	W Fight Hunger		25
Chris Petersen (Pac-12 Conference) (2014–2019)
2014	Chris Petersen	8–6	4–5	3rd (North)	L Cactus		
2015	Chris Petersen	7–6	4–5	4th (North)	W Heart of Dallas		
2016	Chris Petersen	12–2	8–1	1st (North)	L Peach^{†} (CFP Semifinal)	4	4
2017	Chris Petersen	10–3	7–2	T–1st (North)	L Fiesta^{†}	15	16
2018	Chris Petersen	10–4	7–2	T–1st (North)	L Rose^{†}	13	13
2019	Chris Petersen	8–5	4–5	T–2nd (North)	W Las Vegas		
Jimmy Lake (Pac-12 Conference) (2020–2021)
2020	Jimmy Lake	3–1	3–1	1st (North) (Note: Washington was unable to play in the 2020 Pac-12 Championship game due to an outbreak of COVID-19 within the team and, on December 18, the Huskies announced that they would not pursue a bid to a bowl game.)			
2021	Jimmy Lake (Note: Washington suspended Lake without pay on November 8, 2021, after he shoved one of his players the previous weekend. Washington fired Lake on November 14. Defensive coordinator Bob Gregory replaced Lake as interim head coach, going 0–3.)	4–8	3–6	5th (North)			
Kalen DeBoer (Pac-12 Conference) (2022–2023)
2022	Kalen DeBoer	11–2	7–2	T–2nd	W Alamo	8	8
2023	Kalen DeBoer	14–1	9–0	1st	W Sugar^{†} (CFP Semifinal); L CFP NCG^{†}	2	2
Jedd Fisch (Big Ten Conference) (2024–present)
2024	Jedd Fisch	6–7	4–5	T–9th	L Sun		
2025	Jedd Fisch	9–4	5–4	T–7th	W LA		
Total:		781–472–50					
National championship Conference title Conference division title or championship game berth
^{†}Indicates Bowl Coalition, Bowl Alliance, BCS, or CFP / New Years' Six bowl.; ^{#}Rankings from final Coaches Poll.; ^{°}Rankings from final AP Poll.

== All-time records ==
Total wins, losses, and ties
Statistic	Wins	Losses	Ties
Pacific Coast Conference games (1916–1958)	131	119	20
Pac-8, 10, 12 Conference games (1959–2023)	291	198	3
Big Ten Conference games (2024–present)	4	5	0
Bowl game appearances	20	22	1
All-time regular and postseason record (1889–2024)	781	473	50
