= 1894 Stanford football team =

American college football season

1894 Stanford football
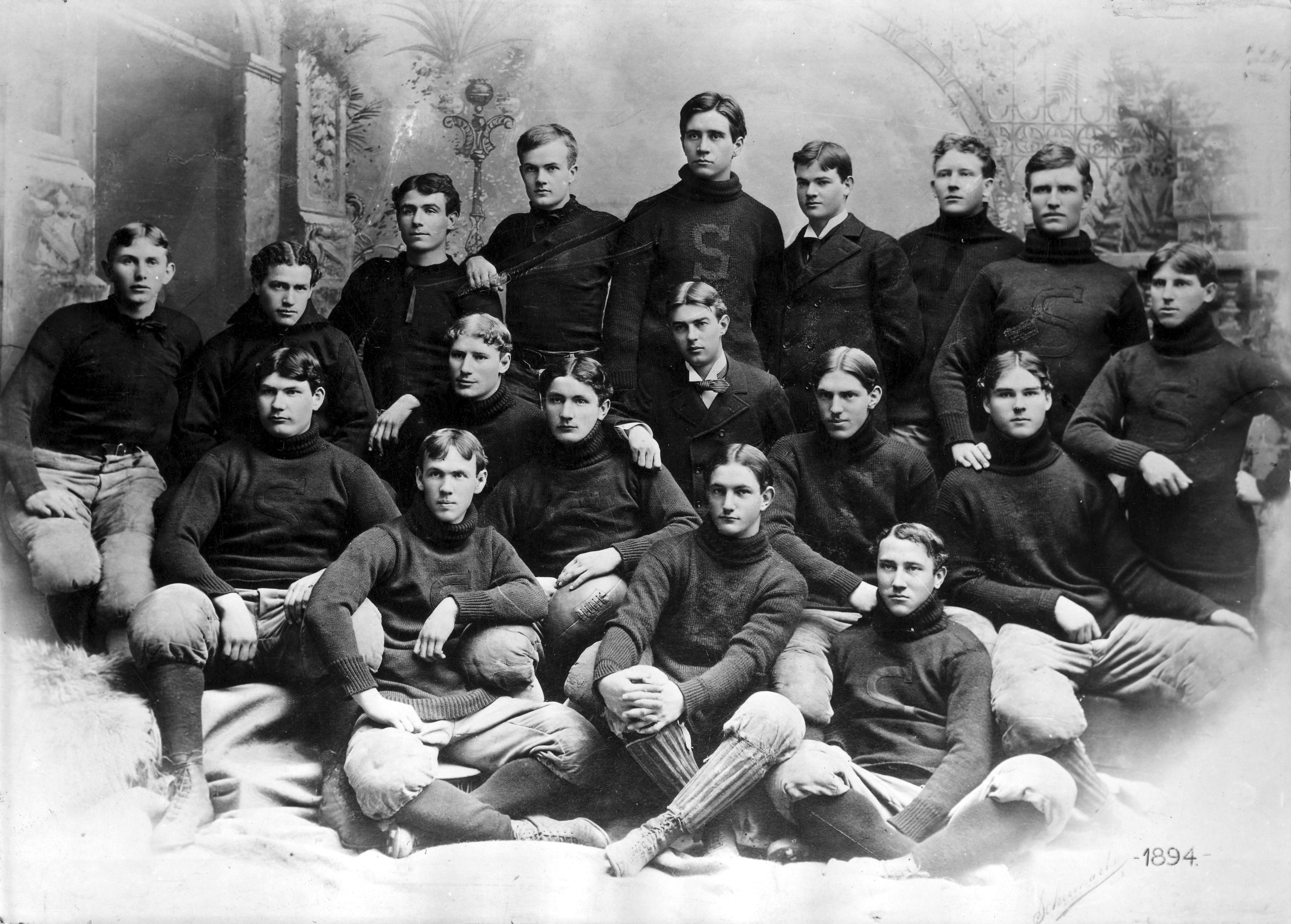
- Conference: Independent
- Record: 6–3
- Head coach: Walter Camp (2nd season)

1894 Far West college football independents records
	Conf.			Overall
Team	W	L	T	W		L		T
Wyoming		–		3	–	0	–	0
USC		–		1	–	0	–	0
Stanford		–		6	–	3	–	0
Saint Mary's		–		2	–	2	–	0
Washington Agricultural		–		1	–	1	–	0
Washington		–		1	–	1	–	1
Utah		–		1	–	2	–	0
California		–		0	–	1	–	2
New Mexico A&M		–		0	–	1	–	0
Idaho		–		0	–	2	–	0

The 1894 Stanford football team represented Stanford University in the 1894 college football season and was coached by Walter Camp, who had previously coached the team in 1892.

Herbert Hoover, later the 31st president of the United States, was team manager.

== Season summary ==
Pop Bliss had coached Stanford the previous season at Stanford; Walter Camp, who had coached Stanford in 1892, returned to Stanford for this season and Bliss moved on to coach Haverford College.

After two consecutive tie games, Stanford defeated California 6–0 in the fourth Big Game. Future Stanford head coach Charles Fickert blocked a punt, which was run into the end zone by Guy Cochran for the game's only score. The game with Chicago was the first intersectional contest.

== Schedule ==
Date	Opponent	Site	Result	Attendance	Source
October 20	vs. Reliance Athletic Club	Haight Street Grounds; San Francisco, CA	L 4–12		
October 27	vs. Stanford (Note: Split squad game; first team defeated second team.)	Santa Cruz, CA	W 14–4		
November 3	vs. Reliance Athletic Club	Haight Street Grounds; San Francisco, CA	L 6–12		
November 10	at Sacramento Athletic Club	Snowflake Park; Sacramento, CA	W 6–0		
November 14	Reliance Athletic Club	Stanford, CA	W 20–0		
November 29	vs. California	Haight Street Grounds; San Francisco, CA (rivalry)	W 6–0		
December 25	vs. Chicago	Haight Street Grounds; San Francisco, CA (1st postseason intersectional game)	L 4–24	4,000	
December 29	vs. Chicago	Athletic Park; Los Angeles, CA	W 12–0		
January 1, 1895	at Los Angeles Athletic Club	Athletic Park; Los Angeles, CA	W 28–0		
