= List of Wyoming Cowboys head football coaches =

List of head football coaches for the Wyoming Cowboys

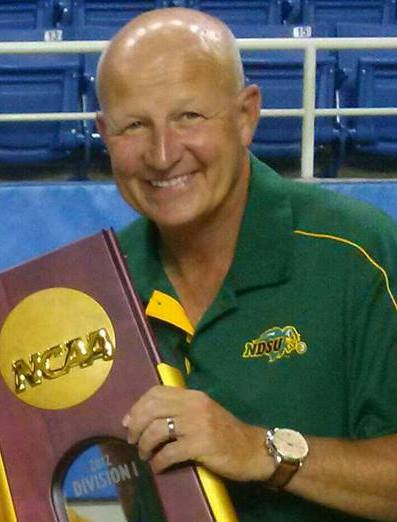
Craig Bohl served as head coach from 2014–2023.

The Wyoming Cowboys college football team represents the University of Wyoming in the Mountain West Conference (MWC), as part of the NCAA Division I Football Bowl Subdivision. The program has had 33 head coaches, and 1 interim head coach, since it began play during the 1892 season. Since December 2023, Jay Sawvel has served as Wyoming's head coach.

Nine coaches have led Wyoming in postseason bowl games: Bowden Wyatt, Phil Dickens, Bob Devaney, Lloyd Eaton, Fred Akers, Paul Roach, Joe Tiller, Joe Glenn, Dave Christensen, and Craig Bohl. Five of those coaches also won conference championships: Devaney captured four, Wyatt two, and Dickens one, as a member of the Skyline Conference; Eaton captured three, Roach two, and both Akers and Tiller one as a member of Western Athletic Conference.

Bohl is the leader in seasons coached, with 10 years as head coach and games coached (121) and won (61). Justus F. Soule has the highest winning percentage at 0.850. Joel Hunt has the lowest winning percentage of those who have coached more than one game, with 0.063. Of the 33 different head coaches who have led the Cowboys, Wyatt, Devaney, Pat Dye, and Dennis Erickson have been inducted into the College Football Hall of Fame.

== Key ==
Key to symbols in coaches list
General		Overall		Conference		Postseason (Note: Although the first Rose Bowl Game was played in 1902, it has been continuously played since the 1916 game, and is recognized as the oldest bowl game by the NCAA. "—" indicates any season prior to 1916 when postseason games were not played.)	
No.	Order of coaches (Note: A running total of the number of head coaches, with coaches who served separate tenures being counted only once. Interim head coaches are represented with "Int" and are not counted in the running total. "—" indicates the team played but either without a coach or no coach is on record. "X" indicates an interim year without play.)	GC	Games coached	CW	Conference wins	PW	Postseason wins
DC	Division championships	OW	Overall wins	CL	Conference losses	PL	Postseason losses
CC	Conference championships	OL	Overall losses	CT	Conference ties	PT	Postseason ties
NC	National championships	OT	Overall ties (Note: Overtime rules in college football were introduced in 1996, making ties impossible in the period since.)	C%	Conference winning percentage		
†	Elected to the College Football Hall of Fame	O%	Overall winning percentage (Note: When computing the win–loss percentage, a tie counts as half a win and half a loss.)				

== Coaches ==
List of head football coaches showing season(s) coached, overall records, conference records (Note: Wyoming has been a member of Mountain West Conference since the 1999 season.), postseason records, championships and selected awards (Note: Statistics correct as of the end of the 2025 NCAA Division I FBS football season.)
No.	Name	Season(s)	GC	OW	OL	OT	O%	CW	CL	CT	C%	PW	PL	PT	DCs	CCs	NCs	Awards
1	Fred Hess	1892; 1894; 1898	8	4	4	0	0.500	—	—	—	—	—	—	—	—	—	0	—
2	Justus F. Soule	1894–1897; 1899	10	8	1	1	0.850	—	—	—	—	—	—	—	—	—	0	—
3	William McMurray	1900–1906	28	16	11	1	0.589	—	—	—	—	—	—	—	—	—	0	—
4	Robert Ehlman	1907–1908	6	3	3	0	0.500	—	—	—	—	—	—	—	—	—	0	—
5	Harold I. Dean	1909–1911	24	11	12	1	0.479	2	3	0	0.400	—	—	—	—	0	0	—
6	Leon Exelby	1912	9	2	7	0	0.222	0	5	0	.000	—	—	—	—	0	0	—
7	Ralph Thacker	1913–1914	11	1	10	0	0.091	0	10	0	.000	—	—	—	—	0	0	—
8	John Corbett	1915–1917; 1919–1923	62	15	44	3	0.266	10	38	3	0.225	—	—	—	—	0	0	—
9	William Henry Dietz	1924–1926	25	10	13	2	0.440	6	11	2	0.368	—	—	—	—	0	0	—
10	George McLaren	1927–1929	26	7	19	0	0.269	1	16	0	0.059	—	—	—	—	0	0	—
11	John Rhodes	1930–1932	27	10	15	2	0.407	5	11	2	0.333	—	—	—	—	0	0	—
12	Willard Witte	1933–1938	49	16	30	3	0.357	11	26	3	0.313	—	—	—	—	0	0	—
13	Joel Hunt	1939	8	0	7	1	0.063	0	5	1	0.083	—	—	—	—	0	0	—
14	Okie Blanchard	1940	9	1	7	1	0.167	0	5	1	0.083	—	—	—	—	0	0	—
15	Bunny Oakes	1941–1942; 1946	28	6	20	2	0.250	2	16	0	0.111	—	—	—	—	0	0	—
16	Bowden Wyatt^{†}	1947–1952	57	39	17	1	0.693	21	13	1	0.614	1	0	0	—	2	0	—
17	Phil Dickens	1953–1956	41	29	11	1	0.720	21	5	1	0.796	1	0	0	—	1	0	—
18	Bob Devaney^{†}	1957–1961	50	35	10	5	0.750	27	4	3	0.838	1	0	0	—	4	0	—
19	Lloyd Eaton	1962–1970	92	57	33	2	0.630	32	19	0	0.627	1	1	0	—	3	0	—
20	Fritz Shurmur	1971–1974	44	15	29	0	0.341	10	18	0	0.357	0	0	0	—	0	0	—
21	Fred Akers	1975–1976	23	10	13	0	0.435	7	7	0	0.500	0	1	0	—	1	0	—
22	Bill Lewis	1977–1979	35	13	21	1	0.386	10	10	0	0.500	0	0	0	—	0	0	—
23	Pat Dye^{†}	1980	11	6	5	0	0.545	4	4	0	0.500	0	0	0	—	0	0	—
24	Al Kincaid	1981–1985	58	29	29	0	0.500	19	21	0	0.475	0	0	0	—	0	0	—
25	Dennis Erickson^{†}	1986	12	6	6	0	0.500	4	4	0	0.500	0	0	0	—	0	0	—
26	Paul Roach	1987–1990	50	35	15	0	0.700	26	6	0	0.813	0	3	0	—	2	0	—
27	Joe Tiller	1991–1996	70	39	30	1	0.564	26	22	1	0.541	0	1	0	1	1	0	—
28	Dana Dimel	1997–1999	35	22	13	—	0.629	14	9	—	0.609	0	0	—	0	0	0	—
29	Vic Koenning	2000–2002	34	5	29	—	0.147	1	21	—	0.045	0	0	—	—	0	0	—
30	Joe Glenn	2003–2008	71	30	41	—	0.423	15	31	—	0.326	1	0	—	—	0	0	—
31	Dave Christensen	2009–2013	62	27	35	—	0.435	16	21	—	0.410	1	1	—	—	0	0	—
32	Craig Bohl	2014–2023	121	61	60	—	0.504	37	41	—	0.474	4	2	—	1	0	0	—
33	Jay Sawvel	2024–present	24	7	17	—	0.292	4	11	—	0.267	0	0	—	0	0	0	—
