= Frank Groesbeck =

American football player (1873–1951)

Profile
- Position: Defensive end

Personal information
- Born: December 1, 1873; Salt Lake City, Utah Territory, U.S.
- Died: December 30, 1951 (aged 78); Salt Lake City, Utah, U.S.

Career information
- College: Utah (1892)

Frank Groesbeck (December 1, 1873 – December 30, 1951) was an American college football player. He was a member of the first football team at the University of Utah. After football he continued to live in Salt Lake City and thus he actively represented the team in the community over the years. In 1939, he and 2 other surviving members were invited to the homecoming football game for a ceremony in their honor. Later, in 1948, Frank and other members of the 1892 team produced a newspaper clipping to a university representative showing that they were in fact the first team.

== Early life and education ==
Groesbeck was born on December 1, 1873, in Salt Lake City, Utah Territory, to John A. and Ann D. Bringhurst Groesbeck. He was a member of the original Utah football team;

== Career ==
Mr. Groesbeck was a passenger agent for the Denver and Rio Grande Western Railroad and later worked for a lumber company in Salt Lake City.

== Later life ==
On December 12, 1894, he married Nellie Young in Missoula, Montana.
