= Seth Thomas (American football) =

American football player (1873–1951)

Seth Edwin Thomas
Profile
- Position: Quarterback

Personal information
- Born: January 7, 1872; Samaria, Idaho Territory, U.S.
- Died: December 18, 1936 (aged 64); Ogden, Utah, U.S.

Career information
- College: Utah (1892, 1894)

Seth Edwin Thomas (January 7, 1872 – December 18, 1936) was an American college football player. He was the quarterback for the first football team at the University of Utah. He was also a member of the 1894 football team playing the same position.

Seth stayed close with some of his teammates through the years. In 1934 the University of Utah awarded Seth and the other members of the 1894 team with "U" sweaters at halftime of the Thanksgiving Day rivalry game. Also that year, The Standard-Examiner presented Seth and 6 other members of the 1892 team with a block "U" sweater in recognition of their efforts establishing the football program. Seth's obituary also noted that several of his teammates attended his funeral services to pay their respects.

== Early life and education ==
Seth was born on January 7, 1872, in Samaria, Idaho Territory to Thomas F. and Marie Anthony Thomas. He was a member of the original Utah football team and graduated from the University of Utah.

== Career ==
Mr. Thomas had several ventures during his career including operating a loan office, was in the sheep business, and at a younger age he was a school principal. He was also a jeweler and pawnbroker in Ogden, Utah for 30 years.

== Later life ==
He was married to Rose May Thomas, with whom he had one daughter. Seth enjoyed fishing and the outdoors.
