= 1892 Stanford football team =

American college football season

1892 Stanford football
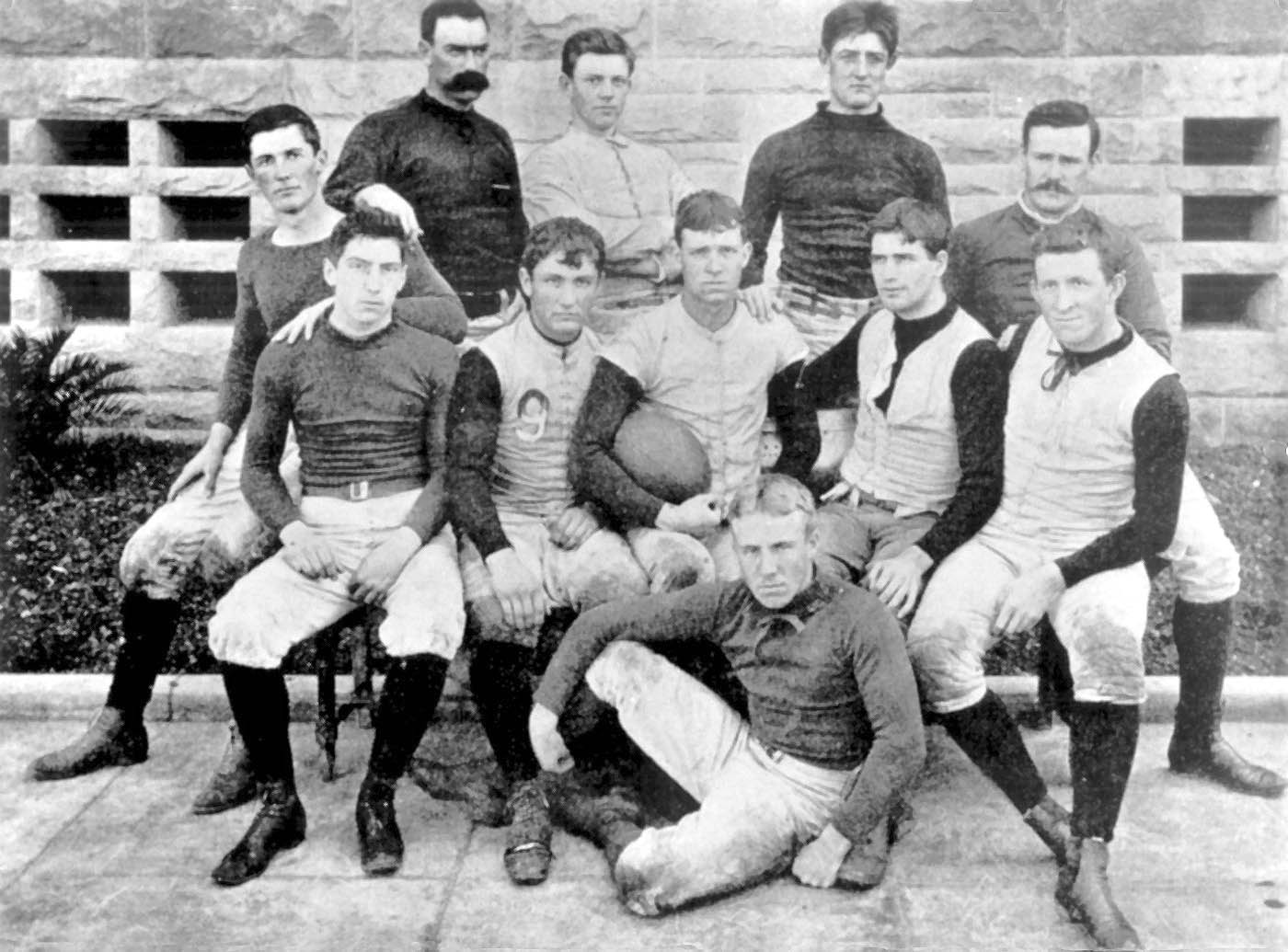
- Conference: Independent
- Record: 1–0–2
- Head coach: Walter Camp (1st season)

1892 Far West college football independents records
	Conf.			Overall
Team	W	L	T	W		L		T
Saint Mary's		–		1	–	0	–	0
Utah Agricultural		–		1	–	0	–	0
Stanford		–		1	–	0	–	2
California		–		2	–	1	–	1
Gonzaga		–		0	–	0	–	1
Washington		–		1	–	1	–	0
San Jose Normal		–		0	–	1	–	0
Utah		–		0	–	1	–	0

The 1892 Stanford football team represented Stanford University in the 1892 college football season and was coached by Walter Camp.

== Season summary ==
Stanford University opened in October 1891. The 1891 football team was hastily organized and played a four-game season beginning in January 1892 with no official head coach. Following the season, Stanford captain John Whittemore wrote to legendary Yale coach Walter Camp asking him to recommend a coach for Stanford. To Whittemore's surprise, Camp agreed to coach the team himself, on the condition that he finish the season at Yale first.

As a result of Camp's late arrival, Stanford played just three official games, against San Francisco's Olympic Club and rival California. The team also played exhibition games against two Los Angeles area teams that Stanford does not include in official results.

Camp returned to the East Coast following the season, then returned to coach Stanford in 1894 and 1895.

== Schedule ==
Date	Opponent	Site	Result
	vs. Olympic Club		W 20–5
	vs. Olympic Club	Haight Street Grounds; San Francisco, CA	T 14–14
December 17	vs. California	Haight Street Grounds; San Francisco, CA (rivalry)	T 10–10
December 26	at Los Angeles AC	Athletic Park; Los Angeles, CA	W 74–0
December 28	at Chaffey	Riverside, CA	W 68–0
