= Tony Parrish =

American football player (born 1975)

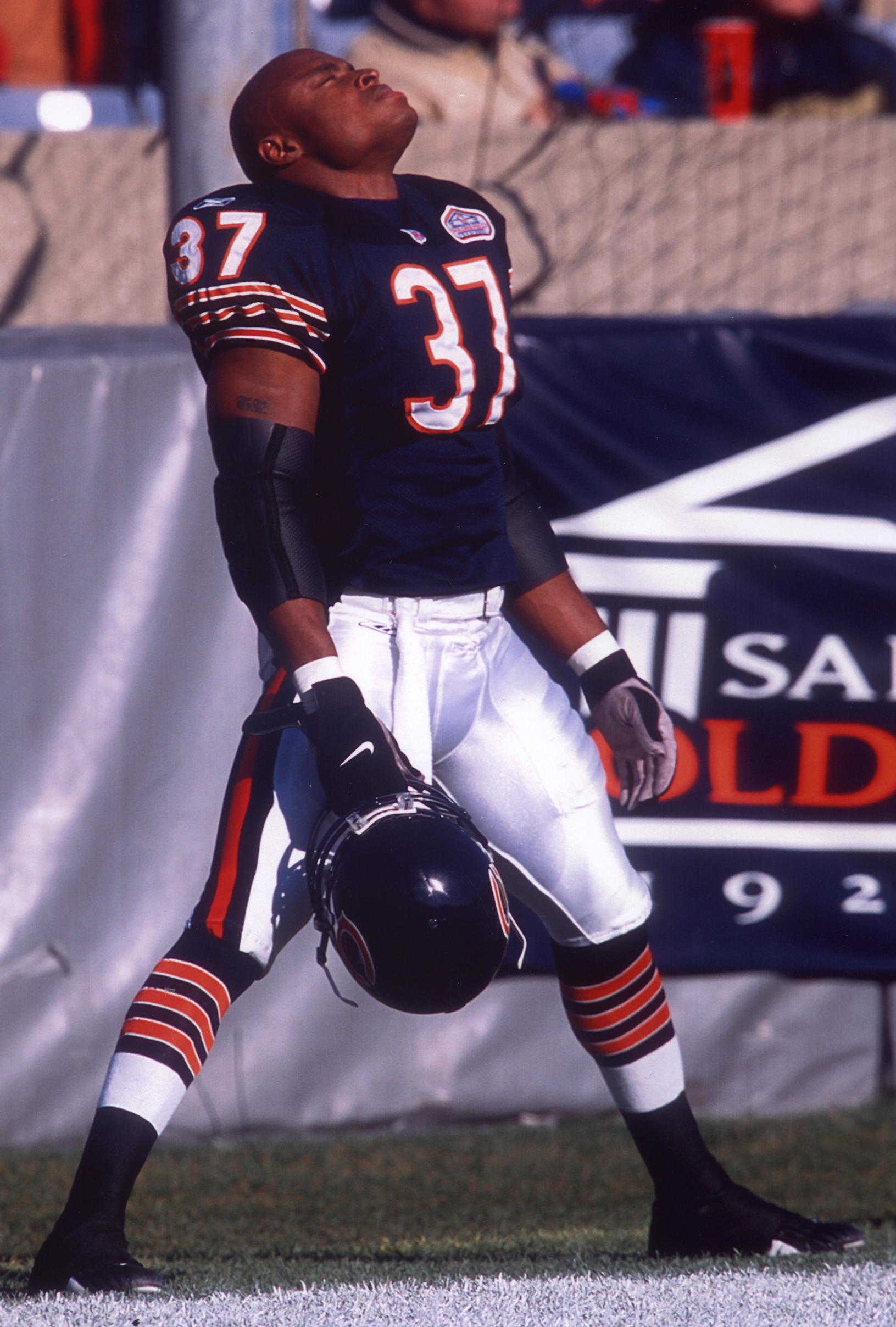
- Parrish with the Chicago Bears in 2001

No. 37, 33, 34
- Position: Safety

Personal information
- Born: November 23, 1975 (age 50); Los Angeles, California, U.S.
- Listed height: 6 ft 0 in (1.83 m)
- Listed weight: 210 lb (95 kg)

Career information
- High school: Marina (Huntington Beach, California)
- College: Washington (1993–1997)
- NFL draft: 1998: 2nd round, 35th overall pick

Career history
- Chicago Bears (1998–2001); San Francisco 49ers (2002–2006); Dallas Cowboys (2006); Las Vegas Locomotives (2009)

Awards and highlights
- UFL champion (2009); Second-team All-Pro (2003); NFL interceptions co-leader (2003); PFWA All-Rookie Team (1998); San Francisco 49ers All-2000s Team; First-team All-Pac-10 (1996); Second-team All-Pac-10 (1997)

Career NFL statistics
- Tackles: 641
- Sacks: 5
- Forced fumbles: 9
- Fumble recoveries: 8
- Interceptions: 30
- Defensive touchdowns: 2
- Stats at Pro Football Reference

Anthony W. Parrish (born November 23, 1975) is an American former professional football player who was a safety for nine seasons in the National Football League (NFL). He played college football for the Washington Huskies and was selected by the Chicago Bears in the second round of the 1998 NFL draft with the 35th overall pick. He was an Associated Press All-Pro in 2003, and is listed on the 49ers' All-2000s team. Parrish was also a member of the San Francisco 49ers, Dallas Cowboys, and Las Vegas Locomotives.

== Early life ==
Parrish grew up in Huntington Beach, California, with a love for soccer and played for the North Huntington Beach Soccer Club (The Pirates). Parrish's team won 3 California State titles and a National Championship.

Parrish starred in multiple sports at Marina High School (Huntington Beach, California), including basketball, baseball, football, and track and field. Parrish was a two-time California state triple jump champion with a personal best of 50 – 11.75 inches. He was named the 1993 Orange County Track Athlete of the Year. As a football player, Parrish was first team All-County as a safety, and also played tailback his senior year, totaling 415 yards and eight touchdowns. Parrish was recruited to play at the University of Washington after his high school coach brought his highlight tape to a Husky Rose Bowl practice at a community college just a few miles from his high school.

== College career ==
Parrish attended the University of Washington, where he played for the Washington Huskies football team from 1993 to 1997 in the Pacific-10 Conference and majored in psychology. He redshirted as a true freshman, and then went on to record 21 tackles and two interceptions during his first year of playing. As a sophomore and freshman, Parrish started a combined eight games at strong safety. He then went on to start every game as a junior at free safety. Parrish was named first-team All-PAC-10, recording 71 tackles, along with two forced fumbles, four fumble recoveries, eight passes defended, and two interceptions.

As a senior, Parrish was named a team captain and led the huskies to an 8–4 record; he was also second-team All-Pac-10 and a semifinalist for the Jim Thorpe Award. He recorded 81 tackles, six interceptions (team-leading), four passes defended, two forced fumbles, two fumble recoveries, and two touchdowns. In the Aloha Bowl that year, the Huskies beat Michigan State 51–23, a game that included Parrish returning an interception 56 yards for a touchdown. While Parrish played for the University of Washington, the Huskies recorded a 31-15 overall record, along with a 22–9–1 record in the Pacific-10 Conference. From 1994 to 1997, Parrish played in 46 of the 47 games he was eligible to play in during his career at the University of Washington.

Parrish lettered twice in track and field for the University of Washington, competing in the triple jump, 55-meter dash, 100-meter dash, and in the 4 × 100 metres relay.

On October 10, 2009, Parrish was named a Husky Legend, a prestigious group that recognizes significant contributions to the husky football program.

== Professional career ==
=== Chicago Bears ===
Parrish was selected by the Chicago Bears with the fifth pick of the second round (35th overall) in the 1998 NFL draft. Parrish started week one at free safety against the Jacksonville Jaguars and recorded a team-leading 14 tackles, three forced fumbles, and a recovered fumble. Parrish went on to start every game his rookie year, tallying 111 tackles, a sack, an interception and five forced fumbles.

His rookie year, Parrish was named to the Pro Football Weekly 1998 All-Rookie team. Following his rookie year, Parrish was also voted by his teammates as the recipient of the Brian Piccolo Award as a testament to his character.

In 1999, the Chicago Bears moved Parrish from free safety to strong safety where he started all 16 games. He improved during his second year in the NFL, recording a career-high 124 tackles, which was second on the team. In week 11 of the 2000 NFL season, Parrish returned an interception for a touchdown against the Tampa Bay Buccaneers in the second quarter, which eventually secured a win for the Bears with a final score of 13–10. In 2000 and 2001, he had three interceptions each year, starting every game each year at strong safety. In 2001, Tony's last year with the Bears, he paired with Mike Brown (free safety) to be one of the leading safety duos in the NFL. In 2001, he helped lead the bears' defense in giving up the fewest points in the NFL. The Bears finished as Champions of the NFC Central with a 13-3 regular season record.

While with the Bears, Parrish was best known for providing solid run support and for his big hits on receivers over the middle of the field. Parrish recorded four 14-tackle games with the Bears and was the first Bear since Mike Singletary (1980) to record 100 tackles in each of his first three seasons.

=== San Francisco 49ers ===
Parrish signed with the San Francisco 49ers on a five-year deal following the 2001 NFL season. Prior to the 49ers April minicamp, Parrish has his right testicle removed in an operation after discovering a tumor in an exam on a nagging groin injury. In his first season with the 49ers, Parrish recorded seven interceptions. Parrish's most notable game in 2002 with the 49ers was in week 14 against the Dallas Cowboys, when Parrish recorded two interceptions with a bulky arm brace because he was playing with a recently dislocated elbow. Parrish received NFC Defensive Player of the Week for his game against Dallas that helped secure a victory. The 49ers went on to win the NFC West in Parrish's first year with a 10–6 overall record.

In Parrish's first year with the 49ers, he started every game at safety while tallying up a team-leading 7 interceptions, one forced fumble, two fumble recoveries, and 71 tackles. Parrish received the Ed Block Courage Award in 2002 for representing courage and leadership in the face of adversity, and in Parrish's case was based on his performance that excelled regardless of the many injuries that he sustained throughout the season. Along with the Ed Block Courage Award, Parrish received multiple awards for his role with the 49ers in 2002 on and off the field: Sports Illustrated All-Pro, Football Digest All-Pro, and the Len Eshmont Award from the 49ers organization (where he was the first 49er to win the award in his inaugural season with the franchise).

Parrish continued his success with the 49ers in 2003 by starting every game for the 49ers and anchoring their defense. Parrish produced another two-interception game in 2003 in week 16 against the Philadelphia Eagles that led to him being named NFC Defensive Player of the Week. Parrish also had five consecutive games with an interception in 2003 (November 17 to December 4), which is the second longest streak for consecutive games with an interception in 49ers history. Parrish tallied an NFL-leading nine interceptions in 2003 as well as 78 combined tackles and a forced fumble. Although he was surprisingly left off of the 2003 Pro Bowl squad, he was named an Associated Press All-Pro and also named to the All-NFC team by Pro Football Weekly. Parrish had another successful season in 2004, recording 87 combined tackles and a team-leading four interceptions.

In 2005, Parrish recorded two interceptions and 44 tackles in 9 starts before fracturing his fibula and ankle against the Chicago Bears in week 9 of the 2005 NFL season. Prior to his injury, Parrish had two more two-interception games, one against the Tampa Bay Buccaneers in 2004 and one against the Dallas Cowboys in 2005. He led the NFL in total interceptions from 2001 to 2005, with 25.

Tony returned to the 49ers before the start of the 2006 season in a starting role, but was released after their ninth game on December 5. Prior to his injury, Parrish started 57 straight games for the 49ers at safety and had started 121 straight games in his NFL career, the longest starting streak at the time since Herman Edwards (135).

Parrish has the seventh most interceptions of all time for the 49ers (22), the fourth most interception return yards in 49ers history (504), and also has the second most interceptions recorded in a single season in 49ers history with nine. Parrish now has some of his memorabilia from his time with the 49ers on display at Levi's Stadium, and is listed on the San Francisco 49ers All-2000s team for his contributions to the team from 2002 to 2006.

=== Dallas Cowboys ===
Following his release from the 49ers in 2006, he was claimed off waivers by the Dallas Cowboys on December 7, to add depth to the secondary for the playoff run. He appeared in one game, while being declared inactive in 3 contests. He wasn't re-signed after the season.

=== Las Vegas Locomotives ===
After spending two years out of football to recover from numerous injuries, Parrish was signed by the Las Vegas Locomotives of the United Football League on August 31, 2009, and became an instant starter and team captain. The Locomotives went on to win the UFL championship in 2009.

== NFL career stats ==
Year	Team	Games	Combined tackles	Tackles	Assisted tackles	Sacks	Forced fumbles	Fumble recoveries	Interceptions	Interception return yards	Interceptions returned for touchdown	Passes defended
1998	CHI	16	111	69	42	1.0	5	2	1	8	0	7
1999	CHI	16	124	75	49	0.0	1	0	1	41	0	6
2000	CHI	16	101	64	37	2.0	2	0	3	81	1	9
2001	CHI	16	80	47	33	1.0	0	2	3	36	0	4
2002	SF	16	71	62	9	0.0	1	2	7	204	0	17
2003	SF	16	78	61	17	0.5	1	1	9	202	0	18
2004	SF	16	87	59	28	0.5	1	1	4	64	0	8
2005	SF	9	44	34	10	0.0	0	0	2	34	1	6
2006	SF	9	21	17	4	0.0	0	0	0	0	0	0
2006	DAL	1	1	1	0	0.0	0	0	0	0	0	0
Career		131	719	489	230	5.0	11	8	30	670	2	75

== Personal life ==
Parrish partnered with fellow Chicago defensive backs and Meals on Wheels to support the ‘Intercept Hunger’ program, be providing meal donations for the needy funded by participating players’ performances during each game. In addition, Parrish supported the Chicago-area Special Olympics program for children and youth with special needs. Parrish was also a lead spokesman and ‘face’ of the “Bear Down’ program, aimed at curbing underage liquor sales and alcohol consumption for the Illinois State Liquor Control Board. Parrish partnered with Lura Lynn Ryan, wife of then Governor George Ryan and together they raised public awareness of the effort to help keep young people from following the wrong path.

While with the San Francisco 49ers, Parrish volunteered and helped manage the "49ers Reading Team", which promotes the benefits of reading to children throughout the Bay Area. Upon receiving the Ed Block award in his 1st season with the 49ers, Parrish became active with a ‘Courage House’ in San Francisco. These houses are orphanages for children of all backgrounds, and Parrish spent considerable time visiting with the young people. Parrish also spent time at the University of California San Francisco Children's Hospital where he consistently met with patients and their families. He created the ‘Tuesday with Tony’ weekly event where he would interact with ailing teenagers. Currently, Parrish is very active in the Right to Play organization as an 'Athlete Ambassador’. ‘Right to Play’ has brought the concept and benefits of team sports to over a million children around the world on a weekly basis.

Parrish also volunteers for Armed Forces Entertainment and Pro Tour Production organizations, and travels abroad to visit US military personnel. He has visited over a dozen military bases in 5 counties to-date including Kuwait, Bahrain, Singapore, and Djibouti (Africa).

== See also ==
- Washington Huskies football statistical leaders
