= Los Angeles Angels (disambiguation) =

The Los Angeles Angels are an American professional baseball team based in Anaheim, California, established in 1961.

Los Angeles Angels may also refer to:

- Los Angeles Angels (California League) (1892–1902)
- Los Angeles Angels (PCL) (1903–1957) Pacific Coast League (PCL), sold to the Los Angeles Dodgers

== See also ==
- Angel (disambiguation)
