= 1892 Washington football team =

American college football season

1892 Washington football
- Conference: Independent
- Record: 1–1
- Head coach: W. B. Goodwin (1st season)
- Captain: Otto Collings
- Home stadium: Madison Park

1892 Far West college football independents records
	Conf.			Overall
Team	W	L	T	W		L		T
Saint Mary's		–		1	–	0	–	0
Utah Agricultural		–		1	–	0	–	0
Stanford		–		1	–	0	–	2
California		–		2	–	1	–	1
Gonzaga		–		0	–	0	–	1
Washington		–		1	–	1	–	0
San Jose Normal		–		0	–	1	–	0
Utah		–		0	–	1	–	0

The 1892 Washington football team was an American football team that represented the University of Washington as an independent during the 1892 college football season. In its first season under W. B. Goodwin, the 1892 Washington team played two games, both against the Seattle Athletic Club. Washington lost the first game, 8–0, and won the second game, 14–0. The victory in the second game was the program's first win. Otto Collings was the team captain.

== Schedule ==
Date	Time	Opponent	Site	Result	Attendance	Source
October 15	3:00 p.m.	Seattle Athletic Club	Madison Park; Seattle, WA	L 0–8	300	
December 17	2:00 p.m.	Seattle Athletic Club	Madison Park; Seattle, WA	W 14–0	100	
