= 1894 Chicago vs. Stanford football game =

College football game

1894 Chicago Maroons vs. Stanford football game
- Predecessor of Bowl games
Chicago Maroons	Stanford
(13–5–1)	(4–2)
24	4
Head coach: Amos Alonzo Stagg	Head coach: Walter Camp
	1	2	Total
Chicago	0	24	24
Stanford	0	4	4
- Date: December 25, 1894
- Season: 1894
- Stadium: Haight Street Grounds
- Location: San Francisco, California
- Attendance: 4,000

The 1894 Chicago vs. Stanford football game, played on December 25, 1894, was a college football game between the Chicago Maroons and Stanford. Chicago won 24 to 4. The game was played in San Francisco, California. It was the first postseason intersectional contest, foreshadowing the modern bowl game. Herbert Hoover was Stanford's student financial manager.

== Game summary ==
Neither team scored in the first half. Freshman Clarence Herschberger played well.

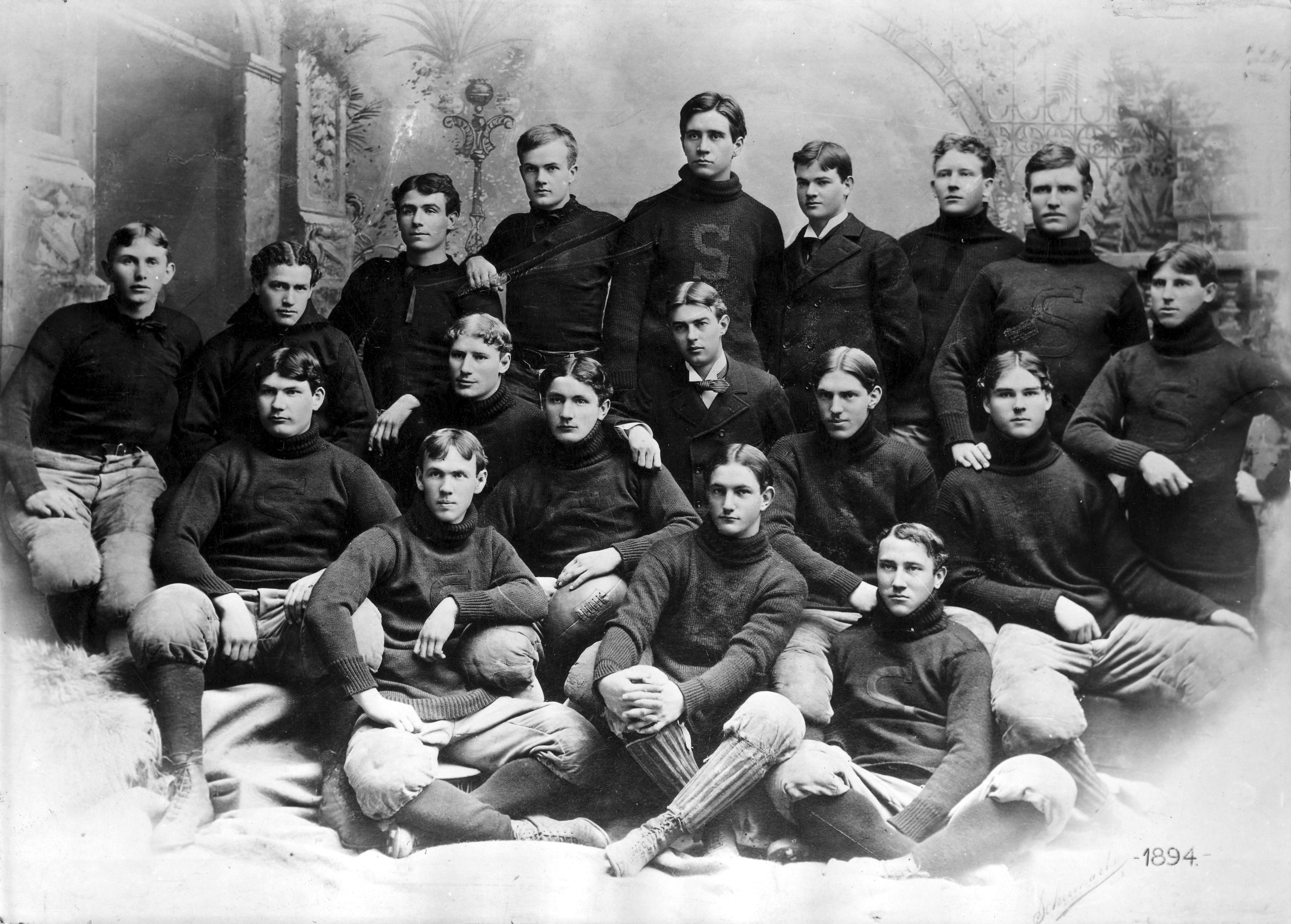
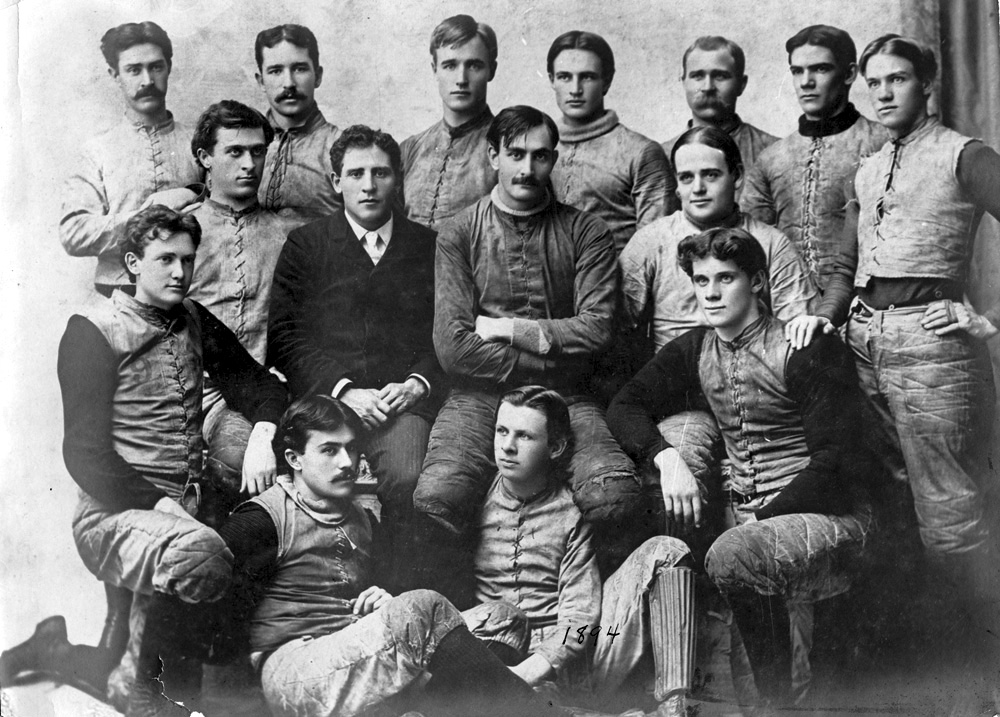
Teams of Stanford (left) and Chicago of 1894

== Aftermath ==
Stanford won a rematch in Los Angeles on December 29 by 12 to 0.
