= 1894 Wyoming Cowboys football team =

American college football season

1894 Wyoming Cowboys football
- Conference: Independent
- Record: 3–0
- Head coach: Justus F. Soule (1st season)
- Captain: Herbert J. Brees

1894 Far West college football independents records
	Conf.			Overall
Team	W	L	T	W		L		T
Wyoming		–		3	–	0	–	0
USC		–		1	–	0	–	0
Stanford		–		6	–	3	–	0
Saint Mary's		–		2	–	2	–	0
Washington Agricultural		–		1	–	1	–	0
Washington		–		1	–	1	–	1
Utah		–		1	–	2	–	0
California		–		0	–	1	–	2
New Mexico A&M		–		0	–	1	–	0
Idaho		–		0	–	2	–	0

The 1894 Wyoming Cowboys football team represented the University of Wyoming as an independent during the 1894 college football season. In its first season under head coach Justus F. Soule, a professor of Latin and Greek, the team compiled a perfect 3–0 record. In games against a Laramie town team, the Wilson Beauties, and the No. 5 Hose Company, the team outscored opponents by a total of 46 to 6.

For the first of three consecutive years, Herbert J. Brees was the team captain. Brees was a native of Laramie who went on to a career in the United States Army. He retired from the Army in 1941 with the rank of lieutenant general.

It was not until 1895 that the team began intercollegiate play.

== Schedule ==
Date	Opponent	Site	Result
October 13	Laramie town team	Laramie, WY	W 14–0
November 29	Wilson Beauties	Laramie, WY	W 16–0
December 25	No. 5 Hose Company	Laramie, WY	W 16–6
Rankings from Coaches' Poll released prior to the game
