= 1892 Utah Agricultural Aggies football team =

American college football season

1892 Utah Agricultural Aggies football
- Conference: Independent
- Record: 1–0
- Head coach: None

1892 Far West college football independents records
	Conf.			Overall
Team	W	L	T	W		L		T
Saint Mary's		–		1	–	0	–	0
Utah Agricultural		–		1	–	0	–	0
Stanford		–		1	–	0	–	2
California		–		2	–	1	–	1
Gonzaga		–		0	–	0	–	1
Washington		–		1	–	1	–	0
San Jose Normal		–		0	–	1	–	0
Utah		–		0	–	1	–	0

The 1892 Utah Agricultural Aggies football team was an American football team that represented Utah Agricultural College (later renamed Utah State University) during the 1892 college football season. In their first season of intercollegiate football, the Aggies compiled a 1–0 record.

On November 25, 1892, the Aggies played the University of Utah football team at Logan, Utah with the Aggies prevailing by a 12–0 score. The game was the first intercollegiate football game in program history for both schools. The game began at 3 p.m. on a muddy field that had been partially cleared of snow. After a scoreless first half, Garf ran for the first touchdown in Aggies history, and F. Olsen kicked the goal from touchdown. The Salt Lake Tribune wrote that "probably no finer exhibition of manly sport was ever witnessed in this part of the country", and reported that no one was injured in the game "except for a few sprains."

The team's lineup against Utah was Harry Sanborn at fullback, George Hughes at right halfback, F. Olsen at left halfback, Claude Raybould at quarterback, Walter Croft at right end, Frank Crittenden at left end, John Bimher at right tackle, Lynne Ashton at left tackle, George Garf at right guard, Blaine Olsen at left end, Robert Erwin at center rush, and Carl Allison at substitute.

After their victory over Utah, the Aggies did not participate in another intercollegiate football team until 1896.

== Schedule ==
Date	Time	Opponent	Site	Result	Source
November 25	3:00 p.m.	Utah	Logan, Utah Territory (rivalry)	W 12–0	
