= 1894 USC Methodists football team =

American college football season

1894 USC Methodists football
- Conference: Independent
- Record: 1–0
- Head coach: None
- Captain: John A. Gray

1894 Far West college football independents records
	Conf.			Overall
Team	W	L	T	W		L		T
Wyoming		–		3	–	0	–	0
USC		–		1	–	0	–	0
Stanford		–		6	–	3	–	0
Saint Mary's		–		2	–	2	–	0
Washington Agricultural		–		1	–	1	–	0
Washington		–		1	–	1	–	1
Utah		–		1	–	2	–	0
California		–		0	–	1	–	2
New Mexico A&M		–		0	–	1	–	0
Idaho		–		0	–	2	–	0

The 1894 USC Methodists football team was an American football team that represented the University of Southern California during the 1894 college football season. The team competed as an independent without a head coach, compiling a 1–0 record.

== Schedule ==
Opponent	Site	Result
Throop	Los Angeles, CA	W 12–0
