= 1892 California Golden Bears football team =

American college football season

1892 California Golden Bears football
- Conference: Independent
- Record: 2–1–1
- Head coach: Lee McClung (1st season)
- Captain: Loren E. Hunt

1892 Far West college football independents records
	Conf.			Overall
Team	W	L	T	W		L		T
Saint Mary's		–		1	–	0	–	0
Utah Agricultural		–		1	–	0	–	0
Stanford		–		1	–	0	–	2
California		–		2	–	1	–	1
Gonzaga		–		0	–	0	–	1
Washington		–		1	–	1	–	0
San Jose Normal		–		0	–	1	–	0
Utah		–		0	–	1	–	0

The 1892 California Golden Bears football team was an American football team that represented the University of California, Berkeley during the 1892 college football season. The team competed as an independent and compiled a record of 2–1–1 under first-year head coach Lee McClung.

== Schedule ==
Date	Time	Opponent	Site	Result	Attendance
October 26		vs. Olympic Club	Haight Street Grounds; San Francisco, CA	L 10–20	
November 5		vs. Olympic Club	Haight Street Grounds; San Francisco, CA	W 16–0	
November 12		vs. Olympic Club	Haight Street Grounds; San Francisco, CA	W 8–4	
December 17	2:30 p.m.	vs. Stanford	Haight Street Grounds; San Francisco, CA (Big Game)	T 10–10	10,000
All times are in Pacific time
