= 1894 California Golden Bears football team =

American college football season

1894 California Golden Bears football
- Conference: Independent
- Record: 0–1–2
- Head coach: Charles O. Gill (1st season)
- Captain: Percy Benson

1894 Far West college football independents records
	Conf.			Overall
Team	W	L	T	W		L		T
Wyoming		–		3	–	0	–	0
USC		–		1	–	0	–	0
Stanford		–		6	–	3	–	0
Saint Mary's		–		2	–	2	–	0
Washington Agricultural		–		1	–	1	–	0
Washington		–		1	–	1	–	1
Utah		–		1	–	2	–	0
California		–		0	–	1	–	2
New Mexico A&M		–		0	–	1	–	0
Idaho		–		0	–	2	–	0

The 1894 California Golden Bears football team was an American football team that represented the University of California, Berkeley during the 1894 college football season. The team competed as an independent under head coach Charles O. Gill and compiled a record of 0–1–2.

== Schedule ==
Date	Opponent	Site	Result	Attendance
October 13	vs. Reliance Athletic Club	Haight Street Grounds; San Francisco, CA	T 12–12	
October 27	vs. Reliance Athletic Club	Piedmont, CA	T 0–0	
November 29	vs. Stanford	Haight Street Grounds; San Francisco, CA (Big Game)	L 0–6	15,000
