= 1894 Washington football team =

American college football season

1894 Washington football
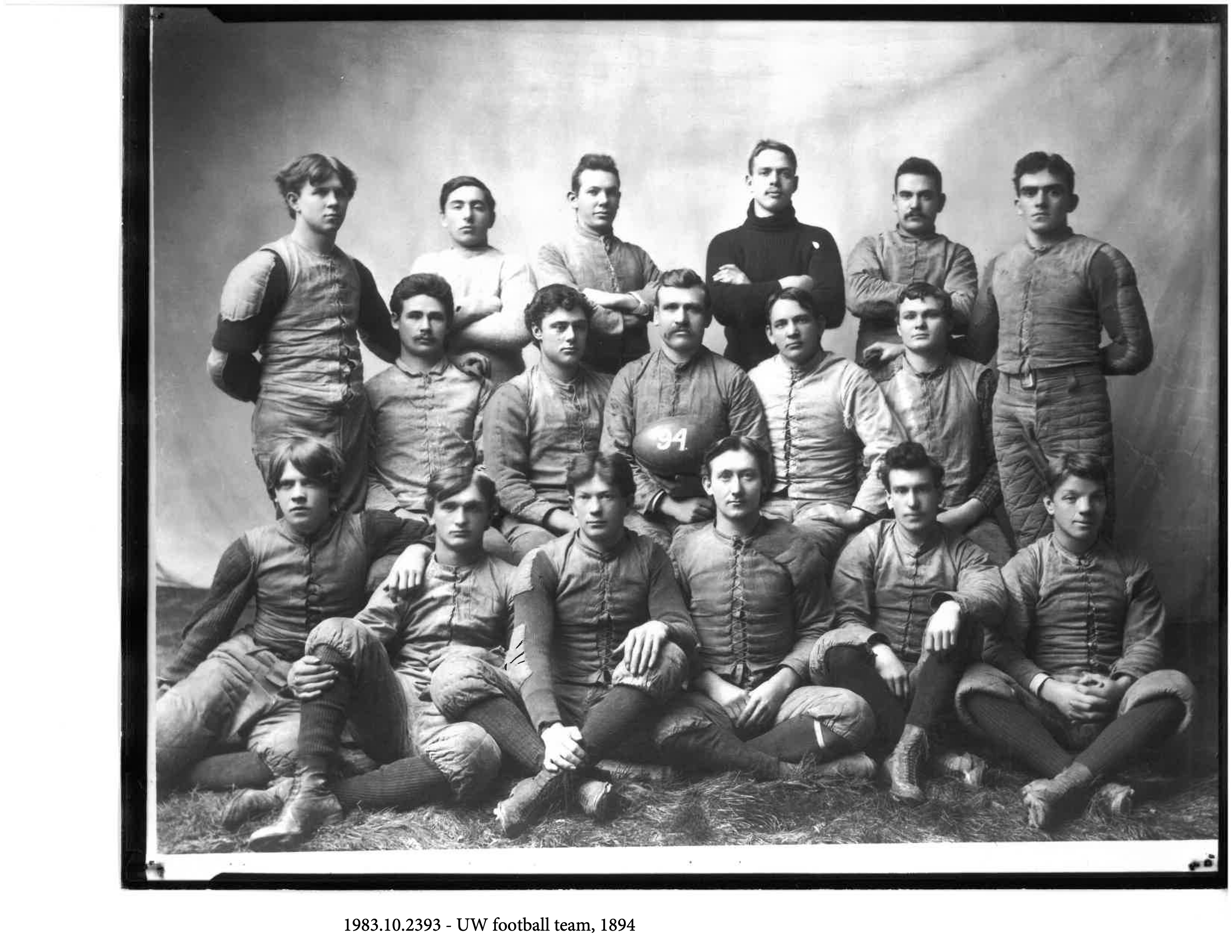
- Conference: Independent
- Record: 1–1–1
- Head coach: Charles Cobb (1st season)
- Captains: Ralph Nichols; Martin Harrias
- Home stadium: Madison Street grounds

1894 Far West college football independents records
	Conf.			Overall
Team	W	L	T	W		L		T
Wyoming		–		3	–	0	–	0
USC		–		1	–	0	–	0
Stanford		–		6	–	3	–	0
Saint Mary's		–		2	–	2	–	0
Washington Agricultural		–		1	–	1	–	0
Washington		–		1	–	1	–	1
Utah		–		1	–	2	–	0
California		–		0	–	1	–	2
New Mexico A&M		–		0	–	1	–	0
Idaho		–		0	–	2	–	0

The 1894 Washington football team was an American football team that represented the University of Washington as an independent during the 1894 college football season. In its first season under Charles Cobb, the Washington team compiled a 1–1–1 record and outscored its opponents by a combined total of 60 to 38. Ralph Nichols was the team captain.

== Schedule ==
Date	Time	Opponent	Site	Result	Attendance	Source
October 13	2:45 p.m.	at Port Townsend Amateur Athletic Club	Port Townsend, WA	T 14–14	250	
October 27	3:30 p.m.	Seattle Athletic Club	Madison Park; Seattle, WA	L 0–24	500	
November 29	2:15 p.m.	at Whitman	Walla Walla, WA	W 46–0	2,000	
