= 1894 Washington Agricultural football team =

American college football season

1894 Washington Agricultural football
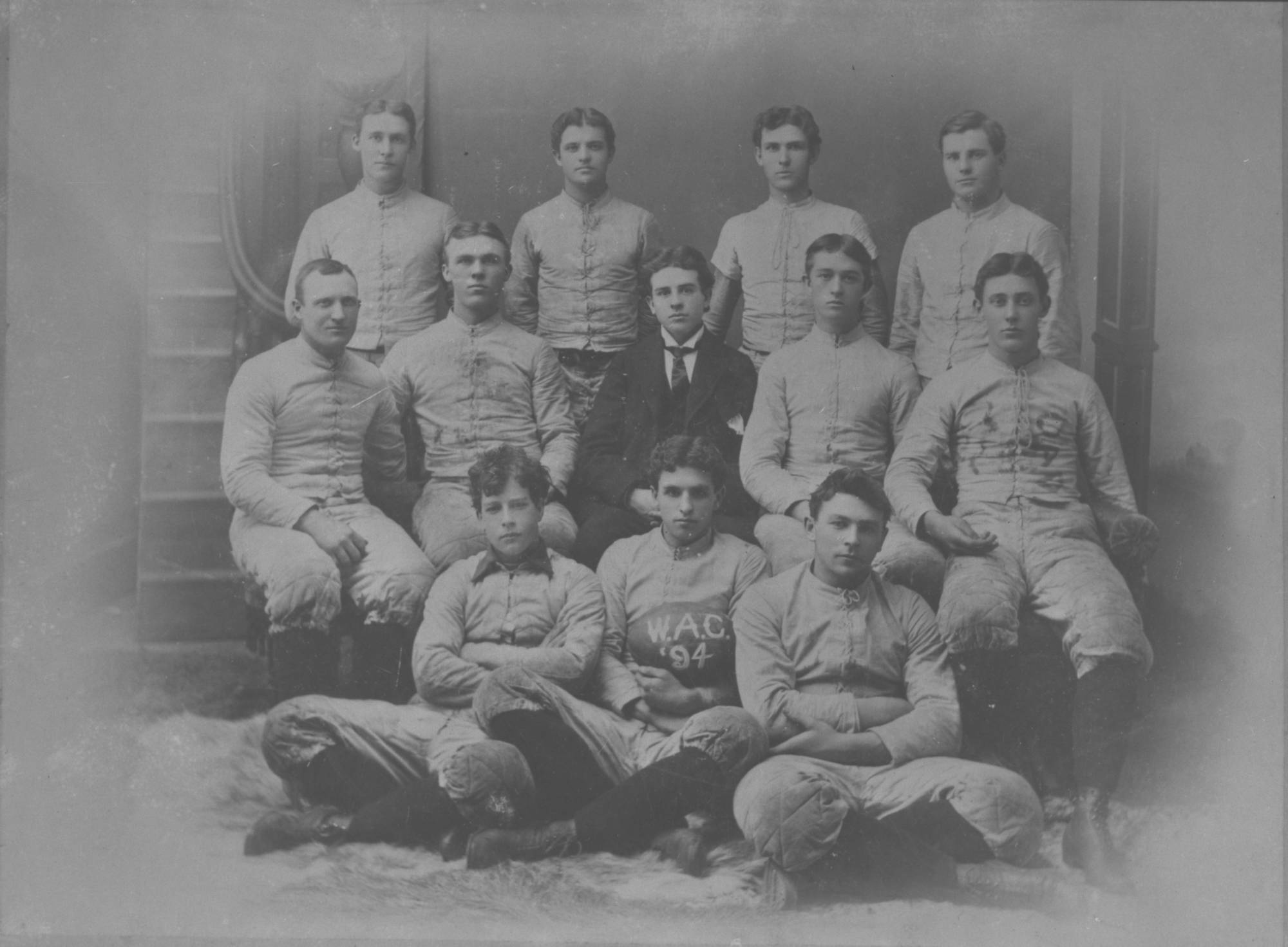
- Conference: Independent
- Record: 1–1
- Head coach: William Goodyear (1st season)
- Captain: Fred W. Long

1894 Far West college football independents records
	Conf.			Overall
Team	W	L	T	W		L		T
Wyoming		–		3	–	0	–	0
USC		–		1	–	0	–	0
Stanford		–		6	–	3	–	0
Saint Mary's		–		2	–	2	–	0
Washington Agricultural		–		1	–	1	–	0
Washington		–		1	–	1	–	1
Utah		–		1	–	2	–	0
California		–		0	–	1	–	2
New Mexico A&M		–		0	–	1	–	0
Idaho		–		0	–	2	–	0

The 1894 Washington Agricultural football team was an American football team that represented Washington Agricultural College during the 1894 college football season. The team was the first team to represent the school. The team competed as an independent under head coach William Goodyear and compiled a record of 1–1.

The team's players included Henry Chittenden, John Clemens, Thomas Hardwick, Edward Kimmel, Fred W. Long, Frank Lowden, Milton McCroskey, Frank McReynolds, Floyd Moore, Walter Savage, and Joe Winston.

In October 1934, 40 years after the first Washington State football game, 12 of the players from the 1894 team and coach Goodyear were honored guests at Washington State's homecoming football game.

== Schedule ==
Date	Opponent	Site	Result	Attendance	Source
November 18	at Idaho	Moscow, ID	W 10–0		
November 29	at Spokane High School	Spokane, WA	L 0–18	1,500	
