= William Goodyear =

American football coach, newspaper publisher, and politician (1865–1936)

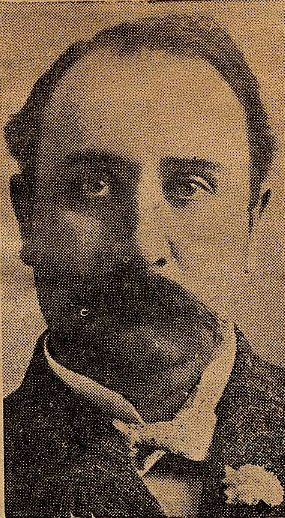
- Goodyear from Pullman Herald, Nov. 1934

Biographical details
- Born: May 21, 1865; New Haven, Connecticut, U.S.
- Died: June 18, 1936 (aged 71); Olympia, Washington, U.S.

Playing career
- c. 1885: Williams

Coaching career (HC unless noted)
- 1894: Washington Agricultural

Head coaching record
- Overall: 1–1

William Goodyear (May 21, 1865 – June 18, 1936) was an American college football coach, newspaper editor, publisher, and politician in Whitman County in eastern Washington. He was the first head coach of the Washington State Cougars football team, holding that position for the 1894 college football season. Goodyear was also a newspaper publisher and editor. His newspapers included the Pullman Herald, the Pullman News, the Colfax Commoner in Colfax, Washington, the Palouse City News in Palouse, Washington, and the Pacific Farmers' Union. He was also active in Democratic Party politics and was the party's candidate for United States Congress in Washington's 3rd congressional district in 1908.

== Early years and family ==
Goodyear was born in New Haven, Connecticut in 1865 to Hannah (née Tuttle) and George Goodyear. He was described as coming from "good New England stock," and was a direct descendant of Stephen Goodyear, who served as deputy governor of the New Haven Plantation from 1643 to 1658. He attended public schools and graduated from Newton High School in Wellesley, Massachusetts.

Goodyear attended Williams College and received his Bachelor of Arts degree there in 1887. While attending Williams, he was a member and president of the Delta Upsilon fraternity, editor of the Literary Monthly, and a member of the college football and tug of war teams.

One week after completing his degree at Williams College, Goodyear moved west and settled in Spokane, Washington (then known as "Spokane Falls") in 1887. He entered the newspaper business as a reporter for the Spokane Falls Review (later known as The Spokesman-Review) from 1887 to 1889, eventually becoming the city editor. In November 1890, he was married to Neva Carleton Shurtleff at a ceremony in Warren, Rhode Island. They had a son, Trevor Shurtleff Goodyear, born in January 1893 at Palouse, Washington.

== Football coach ==
In 1894, Goodyear became the first football coach at Washington State College (now known as Washington State University). He reportedly traveled from his home in Palouse, Washington each night to perform his coaching duties. Goodyear was not paid for teaching the team the elements of the game, and the school did not have a paid coach until 1900.

In the first game in the history of the Washington State Cougars football program, played on November 18, 1894, in Moscow, Idaho, Goodyear led the team to a 10–0 victory over Idaho. Eleven days later, the team suffered its first defeat, losing to the team from Spokane High School by a score of 18–0. Goodyear served only one year as the football coach, leading the team to a record of 1–1.

In October 1934, 40 years after the first Washington State football game, Goodyear and 12 of the players from the 1894 team were honored guests at Washington State's homecoming football game.

== Publisher and politician ==
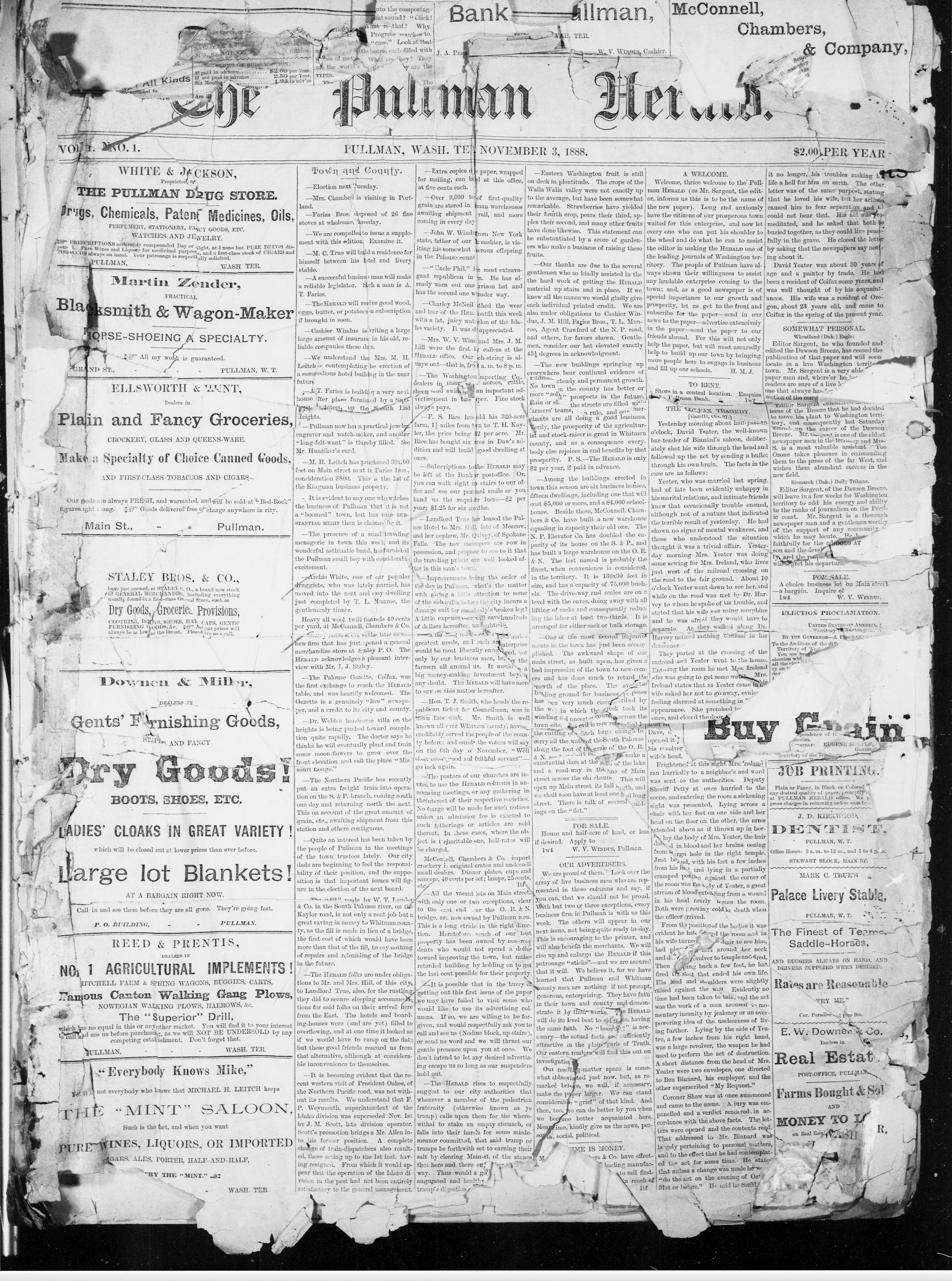
First issue of the Pullman Herald, dated November 3, 1888. Goodyear published the newspaper since 1901.

Goodyear lived in Palouse, Washington in the early part of his career. In 1889, he purchased the Palouse News with partners P. H. Winton and Judge Norman Buck. Goodyear later became the newspaper's sole owner. He owned the newspaper and served as its publisher until 1898. In November 1894, he was nominated by Grover Cleveland as the postmaster at Palouse, and he served in that position during the second Cleveland administration.

Goodyear later moved to Colfax, Washington. In 1898, he purchased the Colfax Commoner and became its publisher and editor. While owned by Goodyear, the Commoner became known as "the leading democratic newspaper of eastern Washington". He was also active in Democratic Party politics in Colfax. When William Jennings Bryan visited the area during his 1900 presidential campaign, Goodyear introduced him as "the man whom the trusts hate, but the people love." Goodyear was nominated as the party's candidate for the United States Congress in 1902 but declined the nomination. In 1908, he ran for Congress, and was the Democratic candidate in Washington's 3rd congressional district which included the entire eastern portion of the state. Goodyear was defeated by Miles Poindexter as Republicans swept the 1908 elections throughout the state.

In 1901, Goodyear leased the plant of the Pacific Farmer's Union, the official publication of the Farmers' Union, and the Pullman Herald and managed those papers as well as the Colfax Commoner for a time. Goodyear sold the Commoner in 1911 and moved to Pullman, where he purchased the plant of the Pullman Herald. He was the publisher of the Pullman Herald until August 1935.

In 1914, Goodyear was appointed as the receiver for the United States Land Office in Walla Walla, Washington. In 1918, he also became the chairman of the Pullman branch of the home service section of the Red Cross, providing relief to the homes of soldiers and sailors. During World War I, he was also the publicity director for the Liberty loan drives in Whitman County.

Goodyear was outspoken on public policy matters and was an advocate of, among other things, the direct primary system and Prohibition at both the state and national level.

== Later years ==
At the time of the 1930 United States census, Goodyear and his wife Neva were living in Pullman. Goodyear's occupation was listed in the census record as a newspaper publisher.

In January 1935, Goodyear's wife, Neva, died after breaking her shoulder in a fall while visiting their son, Trevor S. Goodyear, in Olympia, Washington.

In May 1936, Goodyear sustained a scratch on his toe that developed into gangrene. He was hospitalized in Colfax for several weeks, and doctors eventually amputated his leg just below the knee. He was discharged from the hospital and died weeks later at his son's home in Olympia.

== Head coaching record ==
| Year | Team | Overall | Conference | Standing | Bowl/playoffs |
|---|---|---|---|---|---|
Washington Agricultural (Independent) (1894)
| 1894 | Washington Agricultural | 1–1 | | | |
| Washington Agricultural: | | 1–1 | | | |
| Total: | | 1–1 | | | |
