= 1892 San Jose Normal football team =

American college football season

1892 San Jose Normal football
- Conference: Independent
- Record: 0–1
- Head coach: Unknown

1892 Far West college football independents records
	Conf.			Overall
Team	W	L	T	W		L		T
Saint Mary's		–		1	–	0	–	0
Utah Agricultural		–		1	–	0	–	0
Stanford		–		1	–	0	–	2
California		–		2	–	1	–	1
Gonzaga		–		0	–	0	–	1
Washington		–		1	–	1	–	0
San Jose Normal		–		0	–	1	–	0
Utah		–		0	–	1	–	0

The 1892 San Jose Normal football team represented California State Normal School—now known as San Jose State University—as an independent during the 1892 college football season. In the school's first year fielding an American football team, the San Jose Normal its sole contest against the local YMCA team of San Jose. The game occurred during 1893, but it represented the 1892 academic year and so that is the season it is counted.

== Schedule ==
Date	Opponent	Site	Result
February 11, 1893	vs. San Jose YMCA	Recreation Park; San Jose, CA	L 0–4
