= 1894 University of Utah football team =

American college football season

1894 University of Utah football
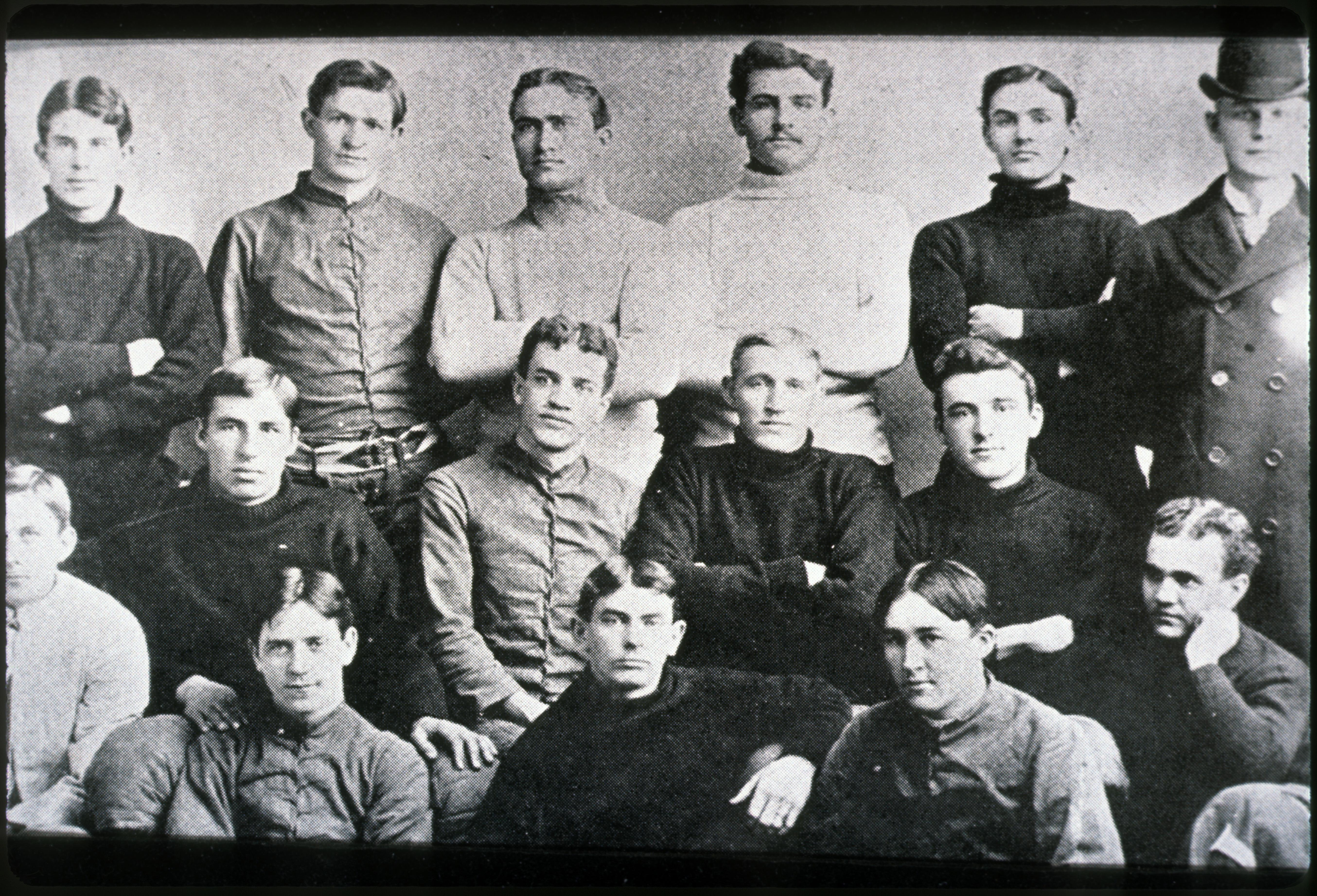
- Conference: Independent
- Record: 1–2
- Head coach: Robert Harkness (1st season)

1894 Far West college football independents records
	Conf.			Overall
Team	W	L	T	W		L		T
Wyoming		–		3	–	0	–	0
USC		–		1	–	0	–	0
Stanford		–		6	–	3	–	0
Saint Mary's		–		2	–	2	–	0
Washington Agricultural		–		1	–	1	–	0
Washington		–		1	–	1	–	1
Utah		–		1	–	2	–	0
California		–		0	–	1	–	2
New Mexico A&M		–		0	–	1	–	0
Idaho		–		0	–	2	–	0

The 1894 University of Utah football team was an American football team that represented the University of Utah as an independent during the 1894 college football season. Coaches Robert Harkness (Yale) and Bert Holden (Harvard) led the team to a 1–2 record.

== Roster ==
The Utah roster included players at the following positions:

- I. E. Willey, right half back
- Seth Thomas, quarter back
- Fred W. Reynolds, left half back
- Ernest (Earnest) Van Cott, left end
- Fred N. Poulson (Paulson), tackle
- David McKay, right guard
- Joe Stringfellow, center
- Bernard (Barnard) J. Stewart, left guard
- Harry Kimball, right end
- A. B. Sawyer, substitute
- Paul Kimball
- I. E. Willey
- Theodore Mystrom
- A. E. Hyde
- J. W. Stringfellow
- Fred H. May
- Fred Earles

== Schedule ==
Date	Time	Opponent	Site	Result	Source
October 4		vs. Salt Lake City High School	Exposition grounds; Salt Lake City, Utah Territory	L 4–20	
November 3		Salt Lake City YMCA	Salt Lake City, Utah Territory	L 0–14	
November 29	2:00 p.m.	vs. Salt Lake City High School	Exposition grounds; Salt Lake City, Utah Territory	W 14–6	
