= Walter Camp =

American football player and coach (1859–1925)

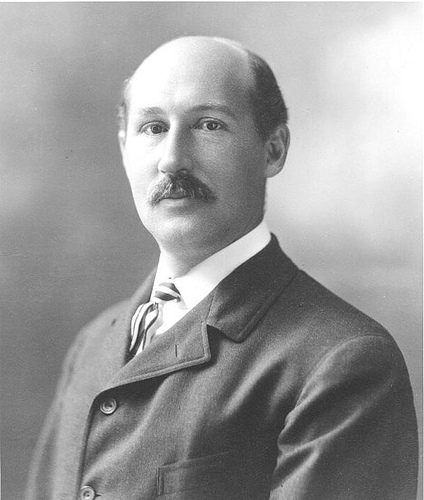
- Camp in 1910

Biographical details
- Born: April 7, 1859; New Britain, Connecticut, U.S.
- Died: March 14, 1925 (aged 65); New York City, U.S.

Playing career
- 1876–1881: Yale
- Position: Halfback

Coaching career (HC unless noted)
- 1888–1892: Yale
- 1892, 1894–1895: Stanford

Head coaching record
- Overall: 79–5–3

Accomplishments and honors

Championships
- 3 national (1888, 1891, 1892)
- College Football Hall of Fame; Inducted in 1951 (profile)

Walter Chauncey Camp (April 7, 1859 – March 14, 1925) was an American college football player and coach, and sports writer known as the "Father of American Football". Among a long list of inventions, he created the sport's line of scrimmage and the system of downs. With John Heisman, Amos Alonzo Stagg, Pop Warner, Fielding H. Yost, Curly Lambeau, and George Halas, Camp was one of the most accomplished persons in the early history of American football. He attended Yale College, where he played and coached college football. Camp's Yale teams of 1888, 1891, and 1892 have been recognized as national champions. Camp was inducted into the College Football Hall of Fame as a coach during 1951.

Camp wrote articles and books on the gridiron and sports in general, annually publishing an "All-American" team. By the time of his death, he had written nearly 30 books and more than 250 magazine articles.

The annual Walter Camp Award is named in his honor, recognizing the best all-around collegiate football player.

== Life ==
Camp was born in New Britain, Connecticut, the son of Leverett Camp and Ellen Sophia (Cornwell) Camp. Walter Camp was of English descent. His first immigrant ancestor was the English colonist Nicholas Camp, who came from Nazeing, Essex, England, and arrived in colonial New England in 1630, arriving first in Massachusetts and then moving to Connecticut that same year. Walter attended Hopkins Grammar School in New Haven, entered Yale College in 1875, and graduated in 1880. At Yale he was a member of Delta Kappa Epsilon fraternity, the Linonian Society, and Skull and Bones. He attended Yale Medical School from 1880 to 1883, where his studies were interrupted first by an outbreak of typhoid fever and then by work for the Manhattan Watch Company. Camp worked for the New Haven Clock Company beginning in 1883, working his way up to chairman of the board of directors.

=== Playing career ===
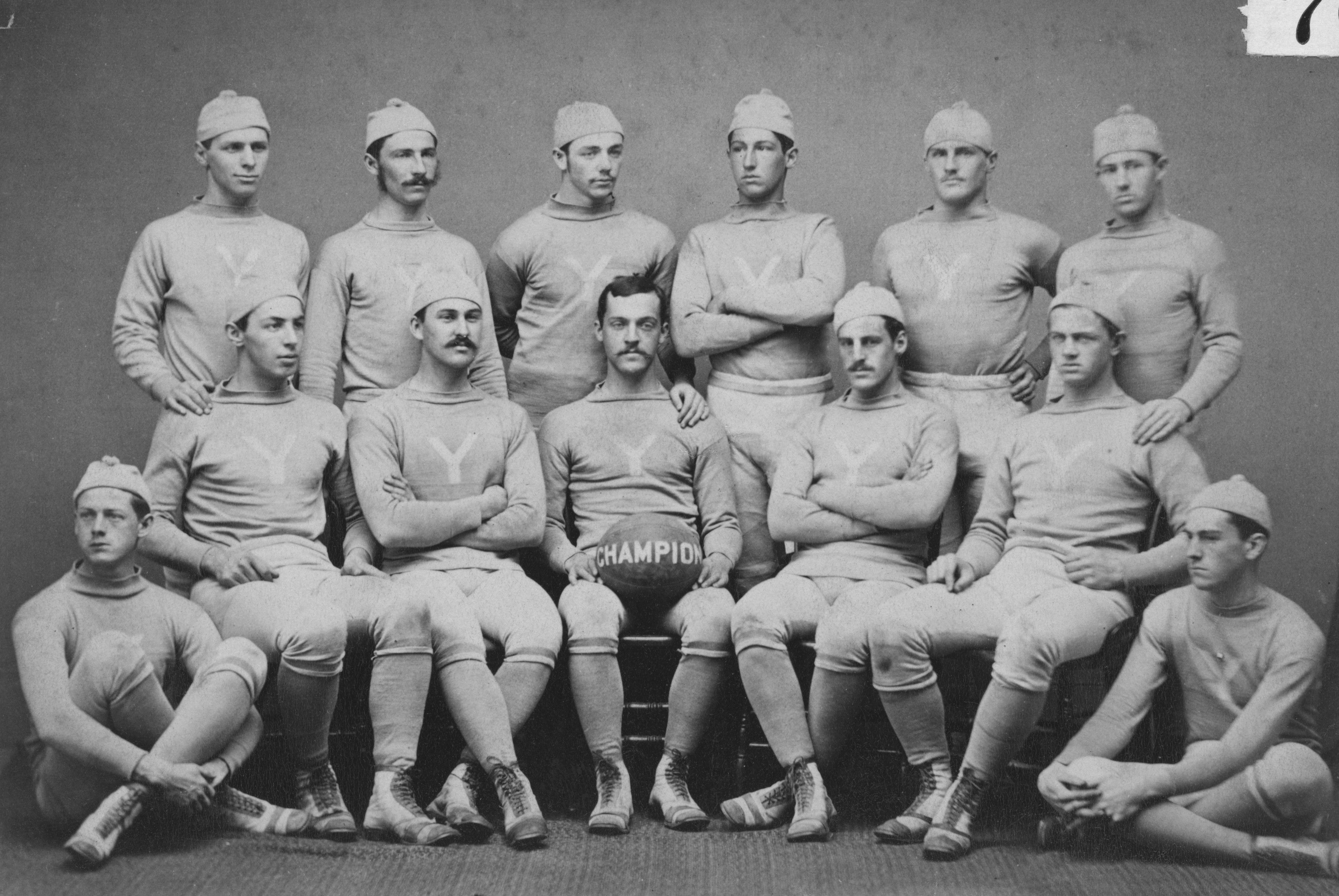
Walter Camp, standing with arms crossed, as a freshman on the 1876 Yale football team.

In 1873, Camp attended a meeting where representatives from Columbia, Rutgers, Princeton, and Yale universities created the Intercollegiate Football Association (IFA). The representatives created the rule that each team is only allowed 15 plays per drive. Camp played as a halfback at Yale from 1876 to 1882. His primary sports were baseball and rugby football before it developed into American football. Harvard player Nathaniel Curtis took one look at Camp, then only 156 pounds, and told Yale captain Gene Baker "You don't mean to let that child play, do you? ... He will get hurt."

=== Family ===
On June 30, 1888, Camp married Alice Graham Sumner, sister of sociologist William Graham Sumner. They had two children: Walter Camp Jr. (1891–1940), who attended Yale as well and was elected as a member of Scroll and Key in 1912, and Janet Camp Troxell (1897–1987). Camp is buried with his wife and children in Grove Street Cemetery in New Haven. He was an Episcopalian.

=== Coaching career ===
Camp served as the head football coach at Yale from 1888 to 1892. In his time with Yale, the team won 68 games and lost just 2 games. He then moved on to Stanford University, where he coached in December 1892 and in 1894 and 1895. On Christmas Day, 1894, Amos Alonzo Stagg and his University of Chicago Maroons defeated Camp's Stanford team 24–4 at San Francisco in an early intersectional contest.

== Father of American football ==
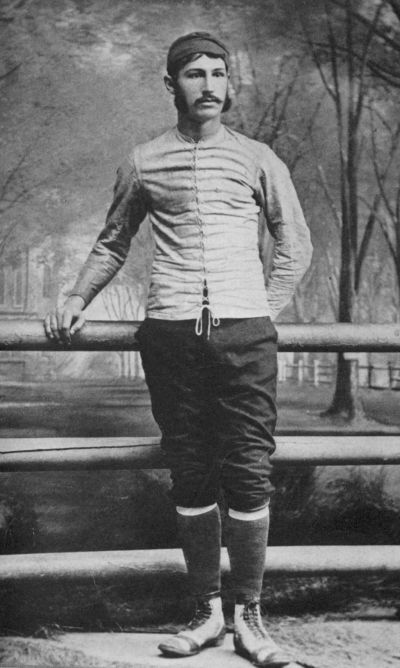
Camp as Yale's captain in 1878

Camp was on the various collegiate football rules committees that developed the American game from his time as a player at Yale until his death. English rugby football rules at the time required a tackled player, when the ball was "fairly held," to put the ball down immediately for scrummage. Camp proposed at the U.S. College Football 1880 rules convention that the contested scrum be replaced with a "line of scrimmage" where the team with the ball started with uncontested possession and with each team fielding eleven players. This change effectively created the evolution of the modern game of American football from its rugby football origins, and was on display in the first game of football between two American colleges played with this format, Harvard and Tufts on June 4, 1875.

He is credited with innovations such as the snap-back from center, the system of downs, and the points system as well as the introduction of what became a standard offensive arrangement of players—a seven-man line and a four-man backfield consisting of a quarterback, two halfbacks, and a fullback. Camp was also responsible for introducing the "safety," the awarding of two points to the defensive side for tackling a ball carrier in his own end zone followed by a free kick by the offense from its own 20-yard line to restart play. This is significant as rugby union has no point value award for this action, but instead awards a scrum to the attacking side five meters from the goal line.

In 2011, reviewing Camp's role in the founding of the sport and of the National Collegiate Athletic Association (NCAA), Taylor Branch also credited Camp with cutting the number of players on a football team from 15 to 11 and adding measuring lines to the field. However, Branch noted that the revelation in a contemporaneous McClure's magazine story of "Camp's $100,000 slush fund," along with concern about the violence of the growing sport, helped lead to President Theodore Roosevelt's intervention in the sport. The NCAA emerged from the national talks, but worked to Yale's disadvantage relative to rival (and Roosevelt's alma mater) Harvard University, according to Branch.

== Writing ==
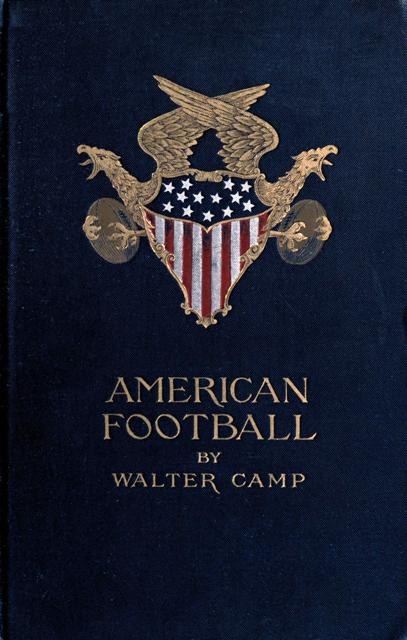
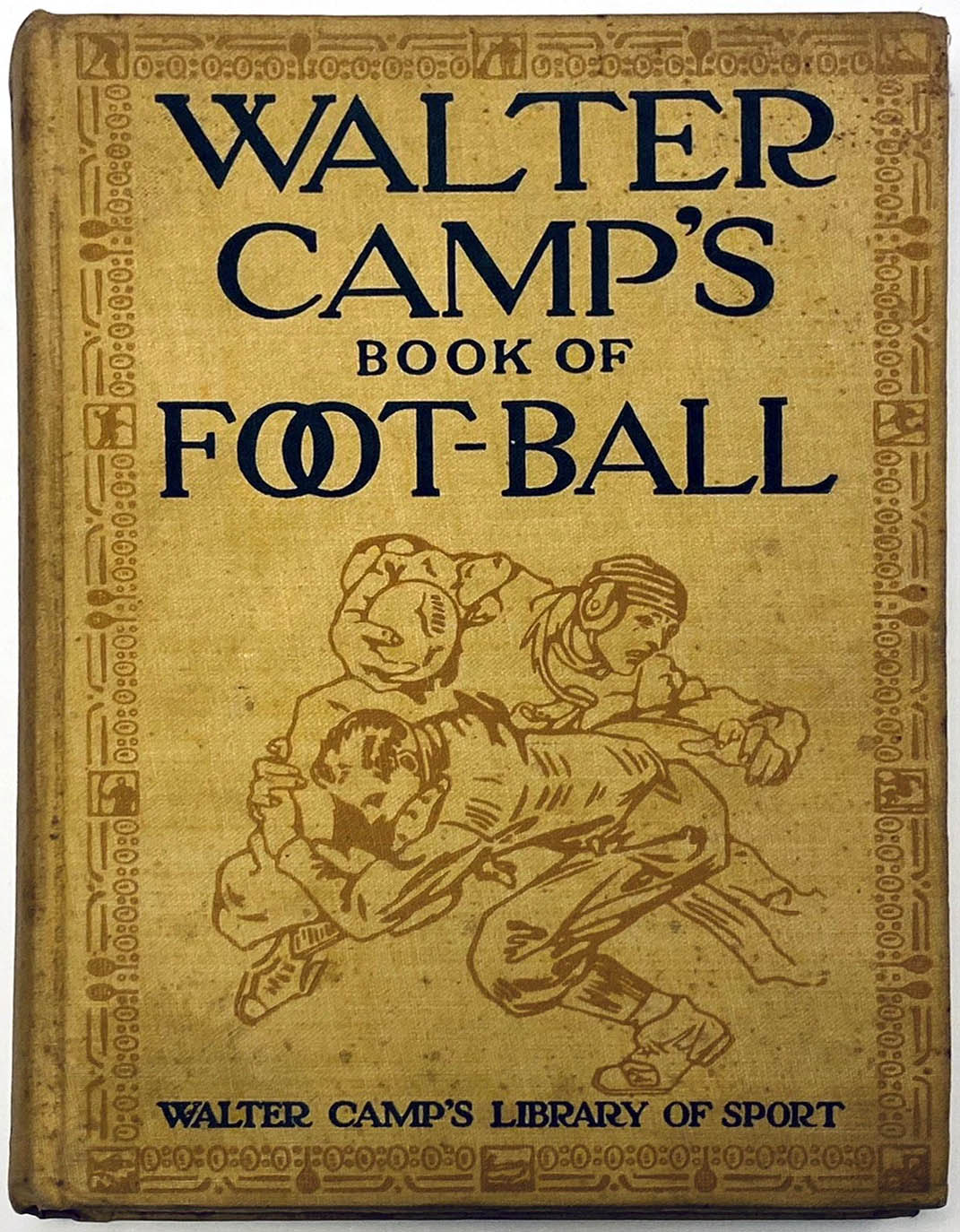
American Football (left), and Book of Foot-Ball, books written by Camp in 1891 and 1910 respectively

Despite having a full-time job at the New Haven Clock Company, a Camp family business, and being an unpaid yet very involved adviser to the Yale football team, Camp wrote articles and books on the gridiron and sports in general. By the time of his death, he had written nearly 30 books and more than 250 magazine articles. His articles appeared in national periodicals such as Harper's Weekly, Collier's, Outing, Outlook, and The Independent, and in juvenile magazines such as St. Nicholas, Youth's Companion, and Boys' Magazine. His stories also appeared in major daily newspapers throughout the United States. He also selected an annual "All-American" team.

By the age of 33, twelve years after graduating from Yale, Walter Camp had already become known as the "Father of Football." In a column in the popular magazine Harper's Weekly, sports columnist Caspar Whitney had applied the nickname; the sobriquet was appropriate because, by 1892, Camp had almost single-handedly fashioned the game of modern American football.

Camp was editor for several sports books published by the Spalding Athletic Library.

=== Eastern bias ===
The dominance of Ivy League players on Camp's All-America teams led to criticism over the years that his selections were biased against players from the leading Western universities, including Chicago, Michigan, Minnesota, Wisconsin, and Notre Dame. Many selectors picked only Eastern players. For example, Wilton S. Farnsworth's 1910 All-American eleven for the New York Evening Journal was made up of five players from Harvard, two from West Point, and one each from Yale, Princeton, Penn, and Brown.

The selectors were typically Eastern writers and former players who attended only games in the East. In December 1910, The Mansfield News, an Ohio newspaper, ran an article headlined: "All-American Teams of East Are Jokes: Critics Who Never Saw Western Teams Play to Name Best in Country -- Forget About Michigan, Minnesota and Illinois." The article noted:

Eastern sporting editors must be devoid of all sense of humor, judging by the way in which they permit their football writers to pick 'All-American' elevens. What man in the lot that have picked 'All-American' elevens this fall, saw a single game outside the North Atlantic States? With a conceit all their own they fail to recognize that the United States reaches more than 200 miles in any direction from New York. ... Suppose an Ohio football writer picked 'All-American' teams. Ohio readers would not stand for it. But apparently the eastern readers will swallow anything.

== The Daily Dozen exercise regimen ==
Camp was a proponent of exercise, and not just for the athletes he coached. While working as an adviser to the United States military during World War I, he devised a program to help servicemen become more physically fit.

Walter Camp has just developed for the Naval of setting up exercises that seems to fill the bill; a system designed to give a man a running jump start for the serious work of the day. It is called the "daily dozen set-up", meaning thereby twelve very simple exercises.

Both the Army and the Navy used Camp's methods.

The names of the exercises in the original Daily Dozen, as the whole set became known, were hands, grind, crawl, wave, hips, grate, curl, weave, head, grasp, crouch, and wing. As the name indicates, there were twelve exercises, and they could be completed in about eight minutes. A prolific writer, Camp wrote a book explaining the exercises and extolling their benefits. During the 1920s, a number of newspapers and magazines used the term "Daily Dozen" to refer to exercise in general.

Starting in 1921 with the Musical Health Builder record sets, Camp began offering morning setting-up exercises to a wider market. In 1922, the initiative reached the new medium of radio.

== Death and legacy ==
Camp died of a heart attack on March 14, 1925, in New York City.

Football historian Timothy P. Brown wrote of Camp nearly a century after his death:

"For his many contributions, he is rightfully known as the father of American football. But saying Walter Camp is the father of American football is to understate his influence during the first fifty years of the game. Camp was the voice of college football to the nation when print was the only medium. He was widely published and syndicated. He was the football authority as a pioneering player, coach, and rule maker. He was Knute Rockne, Grantland Rice, Bud Wilkinson, Vince Lombardi, Paul Zimmerman, and Bill Belichick all rolled into one. His thinking and influence on football, for good and for bad, cannot be underestimated."

== Head coaching record ==
Year	Team	Overall	Conference	Standing	Bowl/playoffs
Yale Bulldogs (Intercollegiate Football Association) (1888–1892)
1888	Yale	13–0		1st	
1889	Yale	16–1			
1890	Yale	13–1		1st	
1891	Yale	13–0		1st	
1892	Yale	13–0		1st	
Yale:		68–2			
Stanford (Independent) (1892)
1892	Stanford	1–0–2			
Stanford (Independent) (1894–1895)
1894	Stanford	6–3			
1895	Stanford	4–0–1			
Stanford:		12–3–3			
Total:		79–5–3			
National championship Conference title Conference division title or championship game berth

== See also ==
- List of college football head coaches with non-consecutive tenure
- Walter Camp Football Foundation

== Bibliography ==
- Ronald A. Smith, Sports and Freedom: The Rise of Big-Time College Athletics, (1990)
- "Walter Camp Found Dead in Hotel Here— Stricken by Heart Attack in Sleep; Was in City for Football Meeting]", The New York Times, March 15, 1925, p. 1
