= W. B. Goodwin =

American college football player and coach

Biographical details
- Born: October 7, 1866; Hartford, Connecticut, U.S.
- Died: May 17, 1950 (aged 83); Hot Springs, Virginia, U.S.

Playing career

Football
- 1884: Yale

Track and field
- 1886–1887: Yale

Coaching career (HC unless noted)

Football
- 1892–1893: Washington

Rowing
- 1901–1903: California

Head coaching record
- Overall: 2–4–1 (football)

William Brownell Goodwin (October 7, 1866 – May 17, 1950) was an American college football player and coach, track and field athlete, rowing coach, insurance executive, and archeologist. He played football at Yale University in 1884 and was a member of Yale's track and field team in 1886 and 1887. Goodwin served as the first head football coach at the University of Washington, coaching from 1892 to 1893 and compiling a record of 2–4–1. Goodwin officiated the first transcontinental football game, played on December 25, 1899, in San Francisco between California and Carlisle.

Goodwin worked as an agent for the Aetna Fire Insurance Company in Columbus, Ohio and San Francisco before retiring around 1930. He thereafter took up an interest in archeology, making field trips in New England. In North Salem, New Hampshire he discovered a number of colonies of beehive huts similar to those built by Culdees of Northern Ireland. His discovery led him to theorize that the Irish had discovered America. Goodwin died on May 17, 1950, in Hot Springs, Virginia.

== Head coaching record ==
=== Football ===
Year	Team	Overall	Conference	Standing	Bowl/playoffs
Washington (Independent) (1892–1893)
1892	Washington	1–1			
1893	Washington	1–3–1			
Washington:		2–4–1			
Total:		2–4–1			
