= Los Angeles Angels (California League) =

The Los Angeles Angels were a professional baseball team that played in the California League in 1892, 1893, 1901 and 1902. Their first home park was Athletic Park.
