= Justus F. Soule =

American football coach, professor, and university administrator

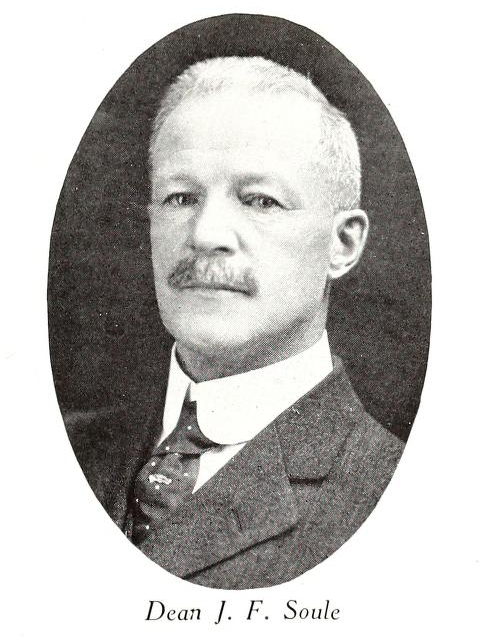

Biographical details
- Born: April 8, 1862; Boston, Massachusetts, U.S.
- Died: October 6, 1939 (aged 77); Fort Leavenworth, Kansas, U.S.

Coaching career (HC unless noted)
- 1894–1897: Wyoming
- 1899: Wyoming

Head coaching record
- Overall: 8–1–1

Justus Freeland Soule (April 8, 1862 – October 6, 1939) was an American football coach, professor of Latin and Greek, and university administrator. He was on the faculty of the University of Wyoming from the school's founding in 1887 until shortly before his death in 1939. He served as the school's head football coach from 1894 to 1897 and in 1899, compiling an 8–1–1 record.

== Early years ==
Soule was born in Boston and educated at Harvard University. He moved to Wyoming after graduating from Harvard and spent four years ranching and riding the range.

== University of Wyoming ==
In September 1887, the University of Wyoming was established, and Soule became one of the original faculty members, teaching Latin and Greek. He served on the faculty for more than 50 years, taking emeritus status after reaching the mandatory retirement age. Soule also served as the school's head football coach from 1894 to 1897 and 1899, compiling a record of 8–1–1. He also served at times as the university's vice president, librarian, liberal arts dean, and dean of men.

== Family and death ==
He was married to Dora Simpson. They had three children: Harold, Margaret, and Robert Homer. His son Robert became a general officer in the United States Army.

Soule died in October 1939 while staying with his son in Fort Leavenworth, Kansas. He was buried at the Greenhill Cemetery in Laramie, Wyoming.

== Head coaching record ==
Year	Team	Overall	Conference	Standing	Bowl/playoffs
Wyoming Cowboys (Independent) (1894–1897)
1894	Wyoming	3–0			
1895	Wyoming	1–0			
1896	Wyoming	2–0			
1897	Wyoming	1–0			
Wyoming Cowboys (Independent) (1899)
1899	Wyoming	0–1–1			
Wyoming:		8–1–1			
Total:		8–1–1			
