= Charles Cobb (American football) =

American football player and coach

Playing career
- ?: Harvard

Coaching career (HC unless noted)
- 1894: Washington

Head coaching record
- Overall: 1–1–1

Charles "Papa" Cobb was an American college football player and coach. He served as the head football coach at the University of Washington for one season, in 1894, compiling a record of 1–1–1. Cobb played football at Harvard University and was quarterback on the 1892 team.

== Head coaching record ==
Year	Team	Overall	Conference	Standing	Bowl/playoffs
Washington (Independent) (1894)
1894	Washington	1–1–1			
Washington:		1–1–1			
Total:		1–1–1			
