= 1892 University of Utah football team =

American college football season

1892 University of Utah football
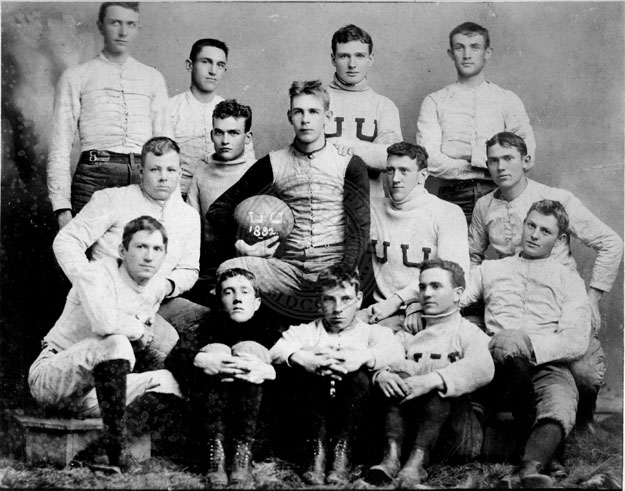
- Conference: Independent
- Record: 0–1
- Head coach: None
- Captain: Alma Cunningham

1892 Far West college football independents records
| | Conf. | | | Overall |
| Team | W | L | T | W | | L | | T |
|---|---|---|---|---|---|---|---|---|
| Saint Mary's | | – | | 1 | – | 0 | – | 0 |
| Utah Agricultural | | – | | 1 | – | 0 | – | 0 |
| Stanford | | – | | 1 | – | 0 | – | 2 |
| California | | – | | 2 | – | 1 | – | 1 |
| Gonzaga | | – | | 0 | – | 0 | – | 1 |
| Washington | | – | | 1 | – | 1 | – | 0 |
| San Jose Normal | | – | | 0 | – | 1 | – | 0 |
| Utah | | – | | 0 | – | 1 | – | 0 |

The 1892 University of Utah football team represented Utah's flagship university during the same year that the university changed its name to the University of Utah. They played during the 1892 college football season and were the university's first collegiate football team under its new name. The team finished 0–1. Cunningham served as Utah's captain.

The team played several games, but only one counts in official school and NCAA records. In that game, the University of Utah lost 12–0 to Utah's land-grant college, Utah Agricultural College (U.A.C.). The two schools went on to become rivals, and the game has been given nicknames such as the Governor's Cup and the Battle of the Brothers. For the game, the university team wore brown pants, white jumpers, and red/crimson stockings.

In 1939, Three members of the 1892 team were invited to be honored at the Utah homecoming game.

== Roster ==
The Utah roster for their first official game on November 25, 1892 at 2 p.m. against U.A.C. included the following players as reported in the Sunday Herald:

| Player | Position |
| Cunningham | Full back |
| Jennings | Right half back |
| McIntyre | Left half back |
| Thomas | Quarter back |
| Wallace | Right end |
| Groesbeck | Left end |
| Christiansen | Right tackle |
| Fisher | Left tackle |
| Grover | Right guard |
| Naylor | Left guard |
| Dow | Center rush |

== Schedule ==
| Date | Time | Opponent | Site | Result | Source |
|---|---|---|---|---|---|
| November 8 | | Fort Douglas† | Salt Lake City, Utah Territory | T 0–0 | |
| November 12 | | Salt Lake City YMCA† | National ball park; Salt Lake City, Utah Territory | L 0–6 | |
| November 22 | | vs. Salt Lake City YMCA† | National ball park; Salt Lake City, Utah Territory | W 4–0 | |
| November 25 | 2:00 p.m. | at Utah Agricultural | Utah A.C. quad; Logan, Utah Territory (rivalry) | L 0–12 | |
†Game not included in official records

== Game summaries ==
=== at Utah Agricultural College ===
University of Utah (0–0) at Utah Agricultural College (0–0) – Game summary

| Quarter | 1 | 2 | Total |
|---|---|---|---|
| U. of U. | 0 | 0 | 0 |
| U. A. C. | 0 | 12 | 12 |

at Logan, Utah Territory

- Date: November 25
- Game time: 2:00 p.m.
- Referee: Professor W. P. Cutter

Game information

First quarter

No scoring plays

Second quarter

- U.A.C. – Garff touchdown (F. Olsen kick). Ag. College 6–0.
- U.A.C. – Touchdown (Raybould kick). Ag. College 12–0.

== See also ==
- List of the first college football games in each U.S. state
