= Seattle Athletic Club =

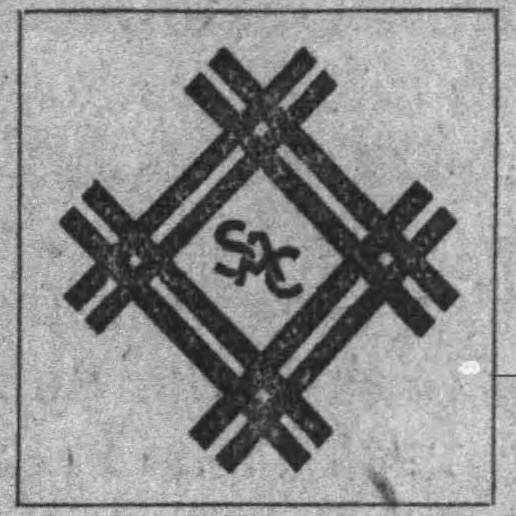
- Abbreviation: S.A.C.
- Formation: February 29, 1888
- Type: Social and recreational club
- Location: Seattle, Washington, United States

The Seattle Athletic Club, founded in 1888, was a private social and athletic club located in downtown Seattle. It has no relationship at all with the current namesake fitness club.

== See also ==
- List of American gentlemen's clubs
