= Athletic Park (Los Angeles) =

Ballpark in Los Angeles, California, US

- Location in the Greater Los Angeles area Location in California Location in the United States Location in North America
- Interactive map of Athletic Park
- Address: Los Angeles, California
- Coordinates: 34.034°N 118.232°W

Tenants
- Los Angeles Angels (CL) 1892–1893; USC Methodists football (Independent) 1895–1898

Athletic Park was a ballpark in Los Angeles, California, United States. Tenants include the Los Angeles Seraphs and Los Angeles Angels. It was the site of the first professional night game on the Pacific coast, which took place on July 2, 1893.

USC played football games against Occidental College, Caltech, Los Angeles High School and Los Angeles Athletic Club at Athletic Park between 1895 and 1898.

An 1894 city map shows Athletic Park bounded by Seventh Street (south), Alameda Street (west) and Mateo Street (east), with Palmetto Street a block's width away to the north.
