= 1917 Saint Mary's Saints football team =

American college football season

1917 Saint Mary's Saints football

California college champion
- Conference: Independent
- Record: 8–1–1
- Head coach: Russell T. Wilson (1st season)

1917 Western college football independents records
	Conf.			Overall
Team	W	L	T	W		L		T
Saint Mary's		–		8	–	1	–	1
Hawaii		–		4	–	0	–	1
USC		–		4	–	2	–	1
New Mexico A&M		–		4	–	2	–	0
Arizona		–		3	–	2	–	0
New Mexico		–		1	–	2	–	0
University Farm		–		1	–	2	–	0
Nevada		–		1	–	3	–	0
Montana		–		1	–	4	–	0

The 1917 Saint Mary's Saints football team was an American football team that represented Saint Mary's College of California during the 1917 college football season. The team compiled an 8–1–1 record, shut out seven of ten opponents, and outscored all opponents by a combined total of 199 to 46. The sole loss was to the undefeated Mare Island Marines team that also won the 1918 Rose Bowl. With victories over both USC and California, the Saint Mary's team was proclaimed in the press as the California college champion.

Prior to 1917, Saint Mary's College had not been known as a football power. As of 1917, the school, located on Broadway in Oakland, California, had only 250 students with an average age of 16, and the Oakland Tribune opined that "only about 20 of the students are football material."

In July 1917, Saint Mary's College hired Russell T. Wilson as its new football coach. Wilson had previously been associated with Whittier College.

== Schedule ==
Date	Opponent	Site	Result	Attendance	Source
September 16	Goat Island Naval Yeoman School	St. Mary's grounds; Moraga, CA	W 7–0		
September 23	San Francisco Originals	St. Mary's grounds; Moraga, CA	T 0–0		
September 29	at Nevada	Mackay Field; Reno, NV	W 41–0		
October 1	at Stewart Indian School	Carson City, NV	W 27–0		
October 14	Fort Winfield Scott	St. Mary's field; Moraga, CA	W 41–6		
October 10	Goat Island Medical School	St. Mary's grounds; Moraga, CA	W 20–0		
October 21	vs. Mare Island Marines	Ewing Field; San Francisco, CA	L 0–27		
October 27	at USC	Bovard Field; Los Angeles, CA	W 7–0		
November 4	Goat Island Naval Yeoman School	St. Mary's field; Moraga, CA	W 42–0		
November 10	at California	California Field; Berkeley, CA	W 14–13		
