= Whitman Fighting Missionaries football, 1910–1919 =

American college football seasons

Whitman Fighting Missionaries football, 1910–1919 encompassed the third decade of college football at Whitman College. The team competed as a member of the Northwest Conference and played its home games at Ankeny Field in Walla Walla, Washington. Whitman disbanded its football program in February 1977 after they compiled a record of 191–325–19 since their first season in 1892.

George McCaa served as head coach for the 1910 season and led Whitman to a record of 2–4. The squad won a pair against local high schools, but then lost their final four games against conference opponents. In March 1911, Archie Hahn was hired as head coach and he served in this position from the 1911–1914 seasons. During his tenure, Hahn led Whitman to a record of 4–14, including a winless season in 1914. Vincent Borleske was hired as head coach in 1915 to succeed Hahn, and he served in this position through the 1946 season. With the exception of the canceled 1918 season, from 1915 to 1919, Borleske compiled a record of 3–16–2. In 1919, Whitman had a 120 point loss against Washington for the largest defeat in program history.

== 1910 ==
1910 Whitman Fighting Missionaries football
- Conference: Northwest Conference
- Record: 2–4 (0–4 Northwest)
- Head coach: George McCaa (1st season)
- Home stadium: Ankeny Field

1910 Northwest Conference football standings
	Conf.					Overall
Team	W		L		T	W		L		T
Washington $	4	–	0	–	0	6	–	0	–	0
Oregon	2	–	0	–	0	4	–	1	–	0
Oregon Agricultural	2	–	2	–	0	3	–	2	–	1
Idaho	2	–	2	–	0	4	–	2	–	0
Washington State	1	–	3	–	0	2	–	3	–	0
Whitman	0	–	4	–	0	2	–	4	–	0
$ – Conference champion

The 1910 Whitman Fighting Missionaries football team represented Whitman College as a member of the Northwest Conference during the 1910 college football season. Under first-year head coach George McCaa, Whitman finished with a record of 2–4, with a mark of 0–4 in conference play for sixth place in the Northwest. Whitman played their home games at Ankeny Field in Walla Walla, Washington.

In July 1910, McCaa was hired as head coach at Whitman. This was the first season he served as a coach after he completed his career with Lafayette in 1909.

=== Schedule ===
Date	Opponent	Site	Result	Attendance	Source
October 7	Pendleton High School (OR)*	Ankeny Field; Walla Walla, WA	W 35–0		
October 14	Waitsburg High School (WA)*	Ankeny Field; Walla Walla, WA	W 39–0		
October 22	at Washington	Denny Field; Seattle, WA	L 8–12	4,500	
November 5	at Oregon Agricultural	Bell Field; Corvallis, OR	L 0–9		
November 11	Idaho	Ankeny Field; Walla Walla, WA	L 0–5		
November 24	Washington State	Ankeny Field; Walla Walla, WA	L 0–8	1,000	
*Non-conference game

== 1911 ==
1911 Whitman Fighting Missionaries football
- Conference: Northwest Conference
- Record: 1–4 (0–4 Northwest)
- Head coach: Archie Hahn (1st season)
- Home stadium: Ankeny Field

1911 Northwest Conference football standings
	Conf.					Overall
Team	W		L		T	W		L		T
Washington $	4	–	0	–	0	7	–	0	–	0
Oregon Agricultural	2	–	1	–	0	5	–	2	–	0
Oregon	2	–	1	–	0	3	–	2	–	0
Washington State	2	–	3	–	0	3	–	3	–	0
Idaho	1	–	2	–	0	4	–	3	–	0
Whitman	0	–	4	–	0	1	–	4	–	0
$ – Conference champion

The 1911 Whitman Fighting Missionaries football team represented Whitman College as a member of the Northwest Conference during the 1911 college football season. Under first-year head coach Archie Hahn, Whitman finished with a record of 1–4, with a mark of 0–4 in conference play for sixth place in the Northwest. Whitman played their home games at Ankeny Field in Walla Walla, Washington.

In March 1911, Hahn was hired as coach and athletic director at Whitman.

=== Schedule ===
Date	Opponent	Site	Result	Source
October 6	Pendleton High School (OR)*	Ankeny Field; Walla Walla, WA	W 57–0	
November 4	at Oregon	Kincaid Field; Eugene, OR	L 5–8	
November 11	at Idaho	Moscow, ID	L 0–5	
November 18	vs. Washington State	Natatorium Park; Spokane, WA	L 0–11	
November 30	Oregon Agricultural	Ankeny Field; Walla Walla, WA	L 3–5	
*Non-conference game

== 1912 ==
1912 Whitman Fighting Missionaries football
- Conference: Northwest Conference
- Record: 2–2 (2–2 Northwest)
- Head coach: Archie Hahn (2nd season)
- Home stadium: Ankeny Field

1912 Northwest Conference football standings
	Conf.					Overall
Team	W		L		T	W		L		T
Washington $	4	–	0	–	0	6	–	0	–	0
Idaho	2	–	2	–	0	2	–	2	–	0
Whitman	2	–	2	–	0	2	–	2	–	0
Oregon	2	–	3	–	0	3	–	4	–	0
Washington State	2	–	3	–	0	2	–	3	–	0
Oregon Agricultural	1	–	3	–	0	3	–	4	–	0
$ – Conference champion

The 1912 Whitman Fighting Missionaries football team represented Whitman College as a member of the Northwest Conference during the 1912 college football season. Under second-year head coach Archie Hahn, Whitman finished with a record of 2–2, with a mark of 2–2 in conference play for a second place tie in the Northwest. Whitman played their home games at Ankeny Field in Walla Walla, Washington.

=== Schedule ===
Date	Opponent	Site	Result	Attendance	Source
October 19	Oregon	Ankeny Field; Walla Walla, WA	W 20–0		
November 9	vs. Washington State	Natatorium Park; Spokane, WA	W 30–0		
November 16	at Oregon Agricultural	Bell Field; Corvallis, OR	L 3–20	2,500	
November 28	Idaho	Ankeny Field; Walla Walla, WA	L 6–13		

== 1913 ==
1913 Whitman Fighting Missionaries football
- Conference: Northwest Conference
- Record: 1–4 (0–4 Northwest)
- Head coach: Archie Hahn (3rd season)
- Home stadium: Ankeny Field

1913 Northwest Conference football standings
	Conf.					Overall
Team	W		L		T	W		L		T
Washington $	4	–	0	–	0	7	–	0	–	0
Oregon Agricultural	3	–	1	–	1	3	–	2	–	3
Idaho	2	–	2	–	0	3	–	3	–	0
Oregon	1	–	1	–	1	3	–	3	–	1
Washington State	1	–	3	–	0	4	–	4	–	0
Whitman	0	–	4	–	0	1	–	4	–	0
$ – Conference champion

The 1913 Whitman Fighting Missionaries football team represented Whitman College as a member of the Northwest Conference during the 1913 college football season. Under third-year head coach Archie Hahn, Whitman finished with a record of 1–4, with a mark of 0–4 in conference play for sixth place in the Northwest. Whitman played their home games at Ankeny Field in Walla Walla, Washington.

=== Schedule ===
Date	Opponent	Site	Result	Attendance	Source
October 18	Oregon Agricultural	Ankeny Field; Walla Walla, WA	L 3–29		
November 1	at Washington	Denny Field; Seattle, WA	L 6–40	4,000	
November 8	at Washington State	Rogers Field; Pullman, WA	L 0–23		
November 15	Idaho	Moscow, ID	L 3–29		
November 27	Montana*	Ankeny Field; Walla Walla, WA	W 35–0		
*Non-conference game

== 1914 ==
1914 Whitman Fighting Missionaries football
- Conference: Northwest Conference
- Record: 0–4 (0–4 Northwest)
- Head coach: Archie Hahn (4th season)
- Home stadium: Ankeny Field

1914 Northwest Conference football standings
	Conf.					Overall
Team	W		L		T	W		L		T
Washington $	3	–	0	–	1	6	–	0	–	1
Oregon Agricultural	2	–	0	–	2	7	–	0	–	2
Oregon	3	–	1	–	1	4	–	2	–	1
Washington State	2	–	3	–	0	2	–	4	–	0
Idaho	1	–	3	–	0	2	–	3	–	1
Whitman	0	–	4	–	0	0	–	4	–	0
$ – Conference champion

The 1914 Whitman Fighting Missionaries football team represented Whitman College as a member of the Northwest Conference during the 1914 college football season. Under fourth-year head coach Archie Hahn, Whitman finished with a record of 0–4, with a mark of 0–4 in conference play for sixth place in the Northwest. Whitman played their home games at Ankeny Field in Walla Walla, Washington.

=== Schedule ===
Date	Opponent	Site	Result	Attendance	Source
October 10	at Oregon	Kincaid Field; Eugene, OR	L 3–29		
October 24	at Washington	Denny Field; Seattle, WA	L 7–28	3,000	
October 31	at Gonzaga*	Spokane, WA	Canceled		
November 14	vs. Washington State	Recreation Park; Spokane, WA	L 6–7	1,500	
November 26	Idaho	Ankeny Field; Walla Walla, WA	L 0–7		
*Non-conference game

== 1915 ==
1915 Whitman Fighting Missionaries football
- Conference: Northwest Conference
- Record: 1–5–1 (0–4–1 Northwest)
- Head coach: Vincent Borleske (1st season)
- Home stadium: Ankeny Field

1915 Northwest Conference football standings
	Conf.					Overall
Team	W		L		T	W		L		T
Washington State ^ +	4	–	0	–	0	7	–	0	–	0
Washington +	1	–	0	–	0	7	–	0	–	0
Oregon	3	–	1	–	0	7	–	2	–	0
Oregon Agricultural	2	–	2	–	0	5	–	3	–	0
Idaho	0	–	3	–	1	1	–	4	–	1
Whitman	0	–	4	–	1	1	–	5	–	1
+ – Conference co-champions; ^ – Selected as Rose Bowl representative

The 1915 Whitman Fighting Missionaries football team represented Whitman College as a member of the Northwest Conference during the 1915 college football season. Under first-year head coach Vincent Borleske, Whitman finished with a record of 1–5–1, with a mark of 0–4–1 in conference play for sixth place in the Northwest. Whitman played their home games at Ankeny Field in Walla Walla, Washington.

In February 1915, Borleske was hired as head coach at Whitman. Prior to being hired as head coach, Borleske attended Whitman and played for the Missionaries from 1907–1909 and served as head coach at Broadway High School in Seattle and Lincoln High School in Portland.

=== Schedule ===
Date	Opponent	Site	Result	Attendance	Source
September 25	The Dalles High School (OR)*	Ankeny Field; Walla Walla, WA	W 13–0		
October 2	Multnomah Athletic Club*	Ankeny Field; Walla Walla, WA	L 0–6		
October 9	at Oregon Agricultural	Bell Field; Corvallis, OR	L 7–34		
October 23	Oregon	Ankeny Field; Walla Walla, WA	L 0–21		
October 30	at Washington	Denny Field; Seattle, WA	L 0–27	3,000	
November 13	at Washington State	Rogers Field; Pullman, WA	L 0–17		
November 25	at Idaho	MacLean Field; Moscow, ID	T 0–0		
*Non-conference game

== 1916 ==
1916 Whitman Fighting Missionaries football
- Conference: Northwest Conference
- Record: 1–5 (1–3 Northwest)
- Head coach: Vincent Borleske (2nd season)
- Home stadium: Ankeny Field

1916 Northwest Conference football standings
	Conf.					Overall
Team	W		L		T	W		L		T
Washington +	2	–	0	–	1	6	–	0	–	1
Oregon +	2	–	0	–	1	7	–	0	–	1
Oregon Agricultural	3	–	2	–	0	4	–	5	–	0
Washington State	2	–	2	–	0	4	–	2	–	0
Whitman	1	–	3	–	0	1	–	5	–	0
Idaho	0	–	3	–	0	3	–	5	–	0
+ – Conference co-champions

The 1916 Whitman Fighting Missionaries football team represented Whitman College as a member of the Northwest Conference during the 1916 college football season. Under second-year head coach Vincent Borleske, Whitman finished with a record of 1–5, with a mark of 1–3 in conference play for fifth place in the Northwest. Whitman played their home games at Ankeny Field in Walla Walla, Washington.

=== Schedule ===
Date	Opponent	Site	Result	Attendance	Source
October 20	Idaho	Ankeny Field; Walla Walla, WA	W 26–14		
October 28	at Washington	Denny Field; Seattle, WA	L 6–37	3,000	
November 4	at Oregon Agricultural	Bell Field; Corvallis, OR	L 0–23		
November 11	at Montana*	Dornblaser Field; Missoula, MT	L 0–17		
November 18	at Multnomah Athletic Club*	Multnomah Field; Portland, OR	L 0–6	500	
November 30	Washington State	Ankeny Field; Walla Walla, WA	L 0–46		
*Non-conference game

== 1917 ==
1917 Whitman Fighting Missionaries football
- Conference: Northwest Conference
- Record: 1–4 (0–3 Northwest)
- Head coach: Vincent Borleske (3rd season)
- Home stadium: Ankeny Field

1917 Northwest Conference football standings
	Conf.					Overall
Team	W		L		T	W		L		T
Washington State $	5	–	0	–	0	6	–	0	–	1
Oregon Agricultural	2	–	1	–	1	4	–	2	–	1
Washington	1	–	1	–	1	1	–	2	–	1
Oregon	1	–	2	–	0	3	–	3	–	0
Idaho	1	–	3	–	0	2	–	3	–	0
Whitman	0	–	3	–	0	1	–	4	–	0
$ – Conference champion

The 1917 Whitman Fighting Missionaries football team represented Whitman College as a member of the Northwest Conference during the 1917 college football season. Under third-year head coach Vincent Borleske, Whitman finished with a record of 1–4, with a mark of 0–3 in conference play for sixth place in the Northwest. Whitman played their home games at Ankeny Field in Walla Walla, Washington.

=== Schedule ===
Date	Opponent	Site	Result	Attendance	Source
October 20	at Washington	Denny Field; Seattle, WA	L 6–14	2,000	
October 27	at Washington State	Rogers Field; Pullman, WA	L 0–19		
November 3	Montana	Ankeny Field; Walla Walla, WA	W 14–3		
November 10	at Idaho	MacLean Field; Moscow, ID	L 0–16		
November 29	at Gonzaga*	Spokane, WA	L 6–7		
*Non-conference game

== 1918 ==
Whitman did not field a team for the 1918 college football season due to the impacts of World War I.

== 1919 ==
1919 Whitman Fighting Missionaries football
- Conference: Northwest Conference
- Record: 0–2–1 (0–0–1 Northwest)
- Head coach: Vincent Borleske (4th season)
- Home stadium: Ankeny Field

1919 Northwest Conference football standings
	Conf.					Overall
Team	W		L		T	W		L		T
Washington State	3	–	1	–	0	5	–	2	–	0
Oregon	2	–	1	–	0	5	–	2	–	0
Oregon Agricultural	1	–	1	–	0	4	–	4	–	0
Idaho	1	–	2	–	0	2	–	3	–	0
Montana	0	–	2	–	1	2	–	3	–	2
Whitman	0	–	0	–	1	0	–	2	–	1

The 1919 Whitman Fighting Missionaries football team represented Whitman College as a member of the Northwest Conference during the 1919 college football season. Under fourth-year head coach Vincent Borleske, Whitman finished with a record of 0–2–1, with a mark of 0–0–1 in conference play for sixth place in the Northwest. Whitman played their home games at Ankeny Field in Walla Walla, Washington.

=== Schedule ===
Date	Opponent	Site	Result	Attendance	Source
October 25	at Washington*	Denny Field; Seattle, WA	L 0–120	5,000	
November 1	at Montana	Dornblaser Field; Missoula, MT	T 6–6		
November 8	Gonzaga*	Ankeny Field; Walla Walla, WA	L 0–38		
*Non-conference game
