= 1911 Washington State football team =

American college football season

1911 Washington State football
- Conference: Northwest Conference
- Record: 3–3 (2–3 Northwest)
- Head coach: Oscar Osthoff (2nd season)
- Captain: Tom Fishback
- Home stadium: Rogers Field

1911 Northwest Conference football standings
	Conf.					Overall
Team	W		L		T	W		L		T
Washington $	4	–	0	–	0	7	–	0	–	0
Oregon Agricultural	2	–	1	–	0	5	–	2	–	0
Oregon	2	–	1	–	0	3	–	2	–	0
Washington State	2	–	3	–	0	3	–	3	–	0
Idaho	1	–	2	–	0	4	–	3	–	0
Whitman	0	–	4	–	0	1	–	4	–	0
$ – Conference champion

The 1911 Washington State football team was an American football team that represented Washington State College—now known as Washington State University—as a member of the Northwest Conference during the 1911 college football season. Led by Oscar Osthoff in his second and final seasons head coach, Washington State compiled an overall record of 3–3 with a mark of in conference play, placing fourth the Northwest Conference.

== Schedule ==
Date	Opponent	Site	Result	Attendance	Source
October 7	Gonzaga*	Rogers Field; Pullman, WA	W 58–0		
October 20	at Idaho	MacLean Field; Moscow, ID (rivalry)	W 17–0		
October 27	Oregon	Rogers Field; Pullman, WA	L 0–6		
November 11	at Oregon Agricultural	Bell Field; Corvallis, OR	L 0–6		
November 18	vs. Whitman	Natatorium Park; Spokane, WA	W 11–0		
November 30	at Washington	Denny Field; Seattle, WA	L 6–30	6,000	
*Non-conference game
