= 1913 Idaho football team =

American college football season

1913 Idaho football
- Conference: Northwest Conference
- Record: 3–3 (2–2 Northwest)
- Head coach: John G. Griffith (9th season)

1913 Northwest Conference football standings
	Conf.					Overall
Team	W		L		T	W		L		T
Washington $	4	–	0	–	0	7	–	0	–	0
Oregon Agricultural	3	–	1	–	1	3	–	2	–	3
Idaho	2	–	2	–	0	3	–	3	–	0
Oregon	1	–	1	–	1	3	–	3	–	1
Washington State	1	–	3	–	0	4	–	4	–	0
Whitman	0	–	4	–	0	1	–	4	–	0
$ – Conference champion

The 1913 Idaho football team represented the University of Idaho as a member of the Northwest Conference during the 1913 college football season. Led by ninth-year head coach John G. Griffith, Idaho compiled an overall record of 3–3 with a mark of 2–2 in conference play, tying for third place in the Northwest Conference. The team's two home games were played in Moscow, but off campus; the new MacLean Field opened the following season.

In the season opener in Spokane, Idaho whipped Gonzaga 54–3, then posted a second-straight win over Washington State in the Battle of the Palouse, 3–0 in Moscow.

Rival Montana was not played this season, and Idaho's three losses were all in Oregon, concluding on New Year's Day against the Multnomah Athletic Club in Portland. With wins over Gonzaga, Washington State, and Whitman, Idaho was the champion of the Inland Empire.

It was Griffith's penultimate year as head coach; he left for Oklahoma A&M (now Oklahoma State) in Stillwater after the 1914 season.

== Schedule ==
Date	Opponent	Site	Result	Source
October 11	at Gonzaga*	Spokane, WA (rivalry)	W 54–3	
October 17	Washington State	Moscow, ID (rivalry)	W 3–0	
October 25	at Oregon	Kincaid Field; Eugene, OR	L 0–27	
November 15	Whitman	Moscow, ID	W 29–3	
November 27	at Oregon Agricultural	Bell Field; Corvallis, OR	L 0–3	
January 1, 1914	at Multnomah Athletic Club*	Multnomah Field; Portland, OR	L 9–20	
*Non-conference game
