= 1912 Washington State football team =

American college football season

1912 Washington State football
- Conference: Northwest Conference
- Record: 2–3 (2–3 Northwest)
- Head coach: John R. Bender (3rd season)
- Captain: Joe Harter
- Home stadium: Rogers Field

1912 Northwest Conference football standings
	Conf.					Overall
Team	W		L		T	W		L		T
Washington $	4	–	0	–	0	6	–	0	–	0
Idaho	2	–	2	–	0	2	–	2	–	0
Whitman	2	–	2	–	0	2	–	2	–	0
Oregon	2	–	3	–	0	3	–	4	–	0
Washington State	2	–	3	–	0	2	–	3	–	0
Oregon Agricultural	1	–	3	–	0	3	–	4	–	0
$ – Conference champion

The 1912 Washington State football team was an American football team that represented Washington State College—now known as Washington State University—as a member of the Northwest Conference during the 1912 college football season. Led by third-year head coach John R. Bender, who returned after a four-year absence, Washington State compiled an overall record of 2–3 with all games played against conference opponents, tying for fourth place in the Northwest Conference.

== Schedule ==
Date	Opponent	Site	Result	Attendance	Source
October 18	Idaho	Rogers Field; Pullman, WA (rivalry)	L 0–13	3,000	
October 26	at Oregon	Kincaid Field; Eugene, OR	W 7–0		
November 1	Oregon Agricultural	Rogers Field; Pullman, WA	W 10–9		
November 9	vs. Whitman	Natatorium Park; Spokane, WA	L 0–30		
November 28	at Washington	Denny Field; Seattle, WA (rivalry)	L 0–19	7,000	
