= Longest NCAA Division I football winning streaks =

In American college football, the longest NCAA Division I winning streak is held by the Oklahoma Sooners, who won 47 consecutive games between 1953 and 1957. The longest FCS winning streak is held by the North Dakota State Bison, who had a winning streak of 39 consecutive wins between 2017 and 2021.

== NCAA Division I Football Bowl Subdivision ==
The following is a list of the longest winning streaks in NCAA Division I FBS of 25 games or more through the 2025 season.

#	Team	Streak	Spoiler	Seasons
1.	Oklahoma	47	Notre Dame	1953–1957
2.	Washington^	40	Oregon State†	1908–1914
3.	Toledo	35	Tampa	1969–1971
4.	Miami (FL)	34	Ohio State‡	2000–2002
4.	USC (Note: As a result of the 2011 NCAA sanctions imposed on USC because of the ineligibility of Reggie Bush, 14 of the Trojans' wins during the streak were vacated.)	34	Texas‡	2003–2005
6.	Pittsburgh	31	Cleveland Naval Reserve	1914–1918
6.	Oklahoma	31	Kentucky‡	1948–1950
8.	Texas	30	Notre Dame‡	1968–1970
9.	Michigan	29	Minnesota†	1901–1903
9.	Miami (FL)	29	Alabama‡	1990–1992
9.	Florida State	29	Oregon‡	2012–2014
9.	Clemson	29	LSU#	2018–2019
9.	Georgia	29	Alabama	2021–2023
14.	Oklahoma	28	Kansas	1973–1975
14.	Alabama	28	Mississippi State	1978–1980
14.	Michigan State	28	Purdue	1950–1953
17.	Michigan	26	Chicago	1903–1905
17.	Nebraska	26	Arizona State	1994–1996
17.	Alabama	26	Clemson#	2015–2016
20.	USC	25	Oregon State†	1931–1933
20.	Army	25	Notre Dame†	1944–1946
20.	Michigan	25	Army	1946–1949
20.	San Diego State	25	Utah State	1965–1967
20.	BYU	25	UCLA	1983–1985
20.	UCF	25	LSU‡	2017–2018

^ Streak was part of Division I's longest unbeaten streak of 64 games (60–0–4) between 1907 and 1917.
† Indicates a streak ended by a tie.
‡ Indicates a streak ended in a bowl game.
# Indicates a streak ended in CFP National Championship.

== NCAA Division I Football Championship Subdivision ==
The following is a list of the longest winning streaks in NCAA Division I FCS. Only schools that have been FCS members for five years are eligible for inclusion.

#	Teams	Streak	Spoiler	Season(s)
1.	North Dakota State	39	Southern Illinois	2017–2020
2.	North Dakota State	33	Northern Iowa	2012–2014
3.	South Dakota State	29	Oklahoma State	2022-2024
4.	James Madison	26	North Dakota State	2016–2017
5.	Penn	24	Columbia	1992–1995
5.	Montana	24	Eastern Washington	2001–2002
7.	Harvard	22	Penn	2013–2015
7.	Sam Houston State	22	Montana State	2019–2021
9.	Montana	21	Marshall	1995–1996
9.	Colgate	21	Delaware	2002–2003
11.	Holy Cross	20	Army	1990–1992
11.	Dayton	20	Cal Poly	1996–1997
13.	Duquesne	19	Robert Morris	1995–1996
13.	Montana State	19	Idaho	2025–2026
15.	Eastern Kentucky	18	Western Kentucky†	1982–1983
15.	Davidson	18	Jacksonville	1999–2001
15.	San Diego	18	UC Davis	2005–2006
18.	Robert Morris	17	Buffalo	1999–2000
18.	Penn	17	Villanova	2002–2004
18.	Richmond	17	Villanova	2008-2009
18.	Appalachian State	17	Wofford	2006-2007
18.	Princeton	17	Dartmouth	2017–2019
23.	Georgia Southern	16	Middle Tennessee	1989–1990
23.	Sam Houston State	16	North Dakota State	2010–2011
23.	North Dakota State	16	Illinois State	2024–2025
26.	Marshall	15	moved to FBS	1996
26.	Dartmouth	15	Lehigh	1996–1997
26.	Montana State	15	North Dakota State	2024

† tie ended the winning streak
