= 1917 Nevada Sagebrushers football team =

American college football season

1917 Nevada Sagebrushers football
- Conference: Independent
- Record: 1–3
- Head coach: Jack Glascock (3rd season)
- Home stadium: Mackay Field

1917 Western college football independents records
	Conf.			Overall
Team	W	L	T	W		L		T
Saint Mary's		–		8	–	1	–	1
Hawaii		–		4	–	0	–	1
USC		–		4	–	2	–	1
New Mexico A&M		–		4	–	2	–	0
Arizona		–		3	–	2	–	0
New Mexico		–		1	–	2	–	0
University Farm		–		1	–	2	–	0
Nevada		–		1	–	3	–	0
Montana		–		1	–	4	–	0

The 1917 Nevada Sagebrushers football team was an American football team that represented the University of Nevada as an independent during the 1917 college football season. The Sagebrushers were led by third-year head coach Jack Glascock and played their home games at Mackay Field.

== Schedule ==
Date	Opponent	Site	Result	Source
September 22	Stewart Indian School (NV)	Mackay Field; Reno, NV	W 50–0	
September 29	Saint Mary's	Mackay Field; Reno, NV	L 0–41	
October 20	at California freshmen	California Field; Berkeley, CA	L 0–60	
October 27	California freshman	Mackay Field; Reno, NV	L 0–54	
