= 1914 Oregon Webfoots football team =

American college football season

1914 Oregon Webfoots football
- Conference: Northwest Conference
- Record: 4–2–1 (3–1–1 Northwest)
- Head coach: Hugo Bezdek (3rd season)
- Captain: John Parsons
- Home stadium: Kincaid Field

1914 Northwest Conference football standings
	Conf.					Overall
Team	W		L		T	W		L		T
Washington $	3	–	0	–	1	6	–	0	–	1
Oregon Agricultural	2	–	0	–	2	7	–	0	–	2
Oregon	3	–	1	–	1	4	–	2	–	1
Washington State	2	–	3	–	0	2	–	4	–	0
Idaho	1	–	3	–	0	2	–	3	–	1
Whitman	0	–	4	–	0	0	–	4	–	0
$ – Conference champion

The 1914 Oregon Webfoots football team represented the University of Oregon as a member of the Northwest Conference during the 1914 college football season. Led by third-year head coach Hugo Bezdek, the Webfoots compiled an overall record of 4–2–1 with a mark of 3–1–1 in conference play placing third in the Northwest Conference.

== Schedule ==
Date	Opponent	Site	Result	Attendance	Source
October 10	Whitman	Kincaid Field; Eugene, OR	W 29–3		
October 17	vs. Washington State	Multnomah Field; Portland, OR	W 7–0		
October 24	at Idaho	MacLean Field; Moscow, ID	W 13–0		
October 30	Willamette*	Kincaid Field; Eugene, OR	W 61–0		
November 14	at Washington	Denny Field; Seattle, WA (rivalry)	L 0–10	4,000	
November 21	at Oregon Agricultural	Bell Field; Corvallis, OR (rivalry)	T 3–3	5,000+	
November 26	at Multnomah Athletic Club*	Multnomah Field; Portland, OR	L 0–14		
*Non-conference game; Source:

== Season summary ==
The 1914 was financially profitable for the associated students of the University of Oregon, which realized revenue over expenses of $4,575 from the team's 7 games. When $3,000 was deducted for salaries and equipment, this resulted in net proceeds of $1,575 for the year for the school. This amount was applied to the student body debt, which exceeded $2,000 before the season.

A detailed accounting was published for the October 17 game against Washington State College, which brought in gate receipts of $1,277.50 against expenses of $1,345.15. For that game, played in Portland for a larger potential gate, the visiting Washington Aggies received a guarantee of $650. Field rental added about $320 to the tab, while train fare and hotel accommodations added another $275 to the bill. The game's three officials were paid $65, and slightly less than $40 was spent on various types of advertising, resulting in a net loss of $67.45 to the school. The poor financial showing — only about half of the previous year's receipts — was attributed to "hard times" and a reduction of ticket prices from $1.50 to $1.00.

The most profitable game of the season for the football program was the game against Oregon Agricultural College, which generated a $3,100 net windfall after the split of the gate. The most costly contest of the year was the season opener against Whitman College, which resulted in a $350 loss after guarantees were paid.

== Roster ==
Detailed roster of the 1914 Webfoots team, published ahead of the November 14 game against Washington.
