= 1911 Idaho football team =

American college football season

1911 Idaho football
- Conference: Northwest Conference
- Record: 4–3 (1–2 Northwest)
- Head coach: John G. Griffith (7th season)

1911 Northwest Conference football standings
	Conf.					Overall
Team	W		L		T	W		L		T
Washington $	4	–	0	–	0	7	–	0	–	0
Oregon Agricultural	2	–	1	–	0	5	–	2	–	0
Oregon	2	–	1	–	0	3	–	2	–	0
Washington State	2	–	3	–	0	3	–	3	–	0
Idaho	1	–	2	–	0	4	–	3	–	0
Whitman	0	–	4	–	0	1	–	4	–	0
$ – Conference champion

The 1911 Idaho football team represented the University of Idaho as a member of the Northwest Conference during the 1911 college football season. Led by seventh-year head coach John G. Griffith, Idaho compiled an overall record of 4–3 with a mark of 1–2 in conference play, placing fifth in the Northwest Conference.

== Schedule ==
Date	Opponent	Site	Result	Source
October 7	Lewiston Normal*	Moscow, ID	W 40–5	
October 14	Gonzaga*	Moscow, ID (rivalry)	W 22–0	
October 20	Washington State	Moscow, ID (Battle of the Palouse)	L 0–17	
October 28	vs. Washington	Natatorium Park; Spokane, WA	L 0–17	
November 11	Whitman	Moscow, ID	W 5–0	
November 25	at Oregon	Kincaid Field; Eugene, OR	Canceled	
November 30	at Utah*	Cummings Field; Salt Lake City, UT	L 0–19	
December 2	at Boise All-Stars*	Cody Park; Boise, ID	W 21–0	
*Non-conference game
