= 1917 Washington State football team =

American college football season

1917 Washington State football

Northwest Conference champion PCC champion
- Conference: Northwest Conference, Pacific Coast Conference
- Record: 6–0–1 (5–0 Northwest, 3–0 PCC)
- Head coach: William Henry Dietz (3rd season)
- Offensive scheme: Single-wing
- Captain: Clarence Zimmerman
- Home stadium: Rogers Field

1917 Northwest Conference football standings
	Conf.					Overall
Team	W		L		T	W		L		T
Washington State $	5	–	0	–	0	6	–	0	–	1
Oregon Agricultural	2	–	1	–	1	4	–	2	–	1
Washington	1	–	1	–	1	1	–	2	–	1
Oregon	1	–	2	–	0	3	–	3	–	0
Idaho	1	–	3	–	0	2	–	3	–	0
Whitman	0	–	3	–	0	1	–	4	–	0
$ – Conference champion

1917 Pacific Coast Conference football standings
	Conf.					Overall
Team	W		L		T	W		L		T
Washington State $	3	–	0	–	0	6	–	0	–	1
California	2	–	1	–	0	5	–	5	–	1
Oregon Agricultural	1	–	2	–	1	4	–	2	–	1
Oregon	1	–	2	–	0	3	–	3	–	0
Washington	0	–	2	–	1	1	–	2	–	1
$ – Conference champion

The 1917 Washington State football team represented Washington State College—now known as Washington State University as a member of the Northwest Conference and the Pacific Coast Conference (PCC) during the 1917 college football season. Led by William Henry Dietz in his third and final season as head coach, Washington State compiled an overall record of 6–0–1, with marks of 5–0 in Northwest Conference play, and 3–0 against PCC opponents, winning both conference titles. The team played home games on campus, at Rogers Field in Pullman, Washington.

Washington State defeated in-state rival Washington for the first time in a decade.

== Schedule ==
Date	Opponent	Site	Result	Attendance	Source
October 13	vs. 362nd Infantry*	Tacoma Stadium; Tacoma, WA	T 0–0	15,000	
October 20	Oregon	Rogers Field; Pullman, WA	W 26–3		
October 27	Whitman	Rogers Field; Pullman, WA	W 19–0		
November 3	at Idaho	MacLean Field; Moscow, ID (rivalry)	W 19–0		
November 10	at Oregon Agricultural	Bell Field; Corvallis, OR	W 6–0		
November 17	vs. Montana*	Recreation Park; Spokane, WA	W 28–0	2,000	
November 29	at Washington	University Field; Seattle, WA (rivalry)	W 14–0	7,000	
*Non-conference game; Source:
