= 1913 Washington State football team =

American college football season

1913 Washington State football
- Conference: Northwest Conference
- Record: 4–4 (1–3 Northwest)
- Head coach: John R. Bender (4th season)
- Captain: Leo Coulter
- Home stadium: Rogers Field

1913 Northwest Conference football standings
	Conf.					Overall
Team	W		L		T	W		L		T
Washington $	4	–	0	–	0	7	–	0	–	0
Oregon Agricultural	3	–	1	–	1	3	–	2	–	3
Idaho	2	–	2	–	0	3	–	3	–	0
Oregon	1	–	1	–	1	3	–	3	–	1
Washington State	1	–	3	–	0	4	–	4	–	0
Whitman	0	–	4	–	0	1	–	4	–	0
$ – Conference champion

The 1913 Washington State football team was an American football team that represented Washington State College—now known as Washington State University—as a member of the Northwest Conference during the 1913 college football season. Led by fourth-year head coach John R. Bender, Washington State compiled an overall record of 4–4 with a mark of 1–3 in conference play, placing fifth in the Northwest Conference.

== Schedule ==
Date	Opponent	Site	Result	Attendance	Source
October 4	Bremerton Navy*	Rogers Field; Pullman, WA	W 26–12		
October 11	Montana*	Rogers Field; Pullman, WA	W 34–9		
October 17	at Idaho	MacLean Field; Moscow, ID (rivalry)	L 0–3	2,500	
October 25	at Multnomah Athletic Club*	Multnomah Field; Portland, OR	L 0–7		
November 1	Gonzaga*	Rogers Field; Pullman, WA	W 26–0		
November 8	Whitman	Rogers Field; Pullman, WA	W 23–0		
November 15	at Oregon Agricultural	Bell Field; Corvallis, OR	L 2–10		
November 27	at Washington	Denny Field; Seattle, WA (rivalry)	L 0–20	6,000	
*Non-conference game
