= 1917 USC Trojans football team =

American college football season

1917 USC Trojans football
- Conference: Independent
- Record: 4–2–1
- Head coach: Dean Cromwell (4th season)
- Captain: Frank Malette
- Home stadium: Bovard Field

1917 Western college football independents records
	Conf.			Overall
Team	W	L	T	W		L		T
Saint Mary's		–		8	–	1	–	1
Hawaii		–		4	–	0	–	1
USC		–		4	–	2	–	1
New Mexico A&M		–		4	–	2	–	0
Arizona		–		3	–	2	–	0
New Mexico		–		1	–	2	–	0
University Farm		–		1	–	2	–	0
Nevada		–		1	–	3	–	0
Montana		–		1	–	4	–	0

The 1917 USC Trojans football team represented the University of Southern California (USC) in the 1917 college football season. In their fourth year under head coach Dean Cromwell, the Trojans compiled a 4–2–1 record and outscored their opponents by a combined total of 127 to 47.

== Schedule ==
Date	Time	Opponent	Site	Result	Attendance	Source
October 20	2:30 p.m.	Arizona	Bovard Field; Los Angeles, CA	W 31–6	2,000	
October 27		Saint Mary's	Bovard Field; Los Angeles, CA	L 0–7		
November 3		at US Army, 21st Infantry	San Diego, CA	W 3–0	5,000	
November 10		Fort MacArthur	Bovard Field; Los Angeles, CA	W 42–0		
November 17	3:00 p.m.	at Utah	Cummings Field; Salt Lake City, UT	W 51–0		
November 24		vs. Mare Island	Washington Park; Los Angeles, CA	L 0–34	3,000	
November 29		California	Bovard Field; Los Angeles, CA	T 0–0	10,000	
