= 1917 Idaho football team =

American college football season

1917 Idaho football
- Conference: Northwest Conference
- Record: 2–3 (1–3 Northwest)
- Head coach: Wilfred C. Bleamaster (2nd season)
- Captain: Tom Jackson
- Home stadium: MacLean Field

1917 Northwest Conference football standings
	Conf.					Overall
Team	W		L		T	W		L		T
Washington State $	5	–	0	–	0	6	–	0	–	1
Oregon Agricultural	2	–	1	–	1	4	–	2	–	1
Washington	1	–	1	–	1	1	–	2	–	1
Oregon	1	–	2	–	0	3	–	3	–	0
Idaho	1	–	3	–	0	2	–	3	–	0
Whitman	0	–	3	–	0	1	–	4	–	0
$ – Conference champion

The 1917 Idaho football team represented the University of Idaho as a member of the Northwest Conference during the 1917 college football season. Led by Wilfred C. BleamasterI in his second and final season as head coach, Idaho compiled an overall record of 2–3 with a mark of 1–3 in conference play, placing fifth in the Northwest Conference. The team had two home games on campus, at MacLean Field in Moscow.

Idaho dropped a fourth consecutive shutout to Washington State in the Battle of the Palouse, falling 0–19 at home. Six years later, the Vandals won the first of three consecutive, their only three-peat in the rivalry series.

Idaho opened with three losses, then won twice for a 2–3 record; they did not play Gonzaga this season.

== Schedule ==
Date	Time	Opponent	Site	Result	Source
October 20	2:30 p.m.	vs. Oregon Agricultural	Round-Up Park; Pendleton, OR	L 6–26	
October 27		at Oregon	Kincaid Field; Eugene, OR	L 0–14	
November 3		Washington State^{†}	MacLean Field; Moscow, ID (Battle of the Palouse)	L 0–19	
November 10		Whitman	MacLean Field; Moscow, ID	W 16–0	
November 29		at Montana*	Dornblaser Field; Missoula, MT (rivalry)	W 14–3	
*Non-conference game; ^{†}Homecoming

== 1918 ==
The following year in 1918, Idaho's football team was non-varsity, composed of Student Army Training Corps (SATC) players. After the Armistice ending World War I, they played a limited schedule and defeated Washington State's SATC team 7–6 in Moscow in December.

Idaho's first two games were against Gonzaga; the opener in Moscow on November 16 was a 13–7 Idaho win, and they tied the next week in Spokane at seven points each. Idaho played another in Spokane on November 30, a 0–68 loss to a team of U.S. Marines from Mare Island Naval Shipyard in California.
