= 1911 Washington football team =

American college football season

1911 Washington football

Northwest Conference champion
- Conference: Northwest Conference
- Record: 7–0 (4–0 Northwest)
- Head coach: Gil Dobie (4th season)
- Captain: William J. Coyle
- Home stadium: Denny Field

1911 Northwest Conference football standings
	Conf.					Overall
Team	W		L		T	W		L		T
Washington $	4	–	0	–	0	7	–	0	–	0
Oregon Agricultural	2	–	1	–	0	5	–	2	–	0
Oregon	2	–	1	–	0	3	–	2	–	0
Washington State	2	–	3	–	0	3	–	3	–	0
Idaho	1	–	2	–	0	4	–	3	–	0
Whitman	0	–	4	–	0	1	–	4	–	0
$ – Conference champion

The 1911 Washington football team was an American football team that represented the University of Washington as a member of the Northwest Conference during the 1911 college football season. In its fourth season under coach Gil Dobie, the team compiled am overall record of 7–0, with a mark of 4–0 in conference play, winning the Northwest Conference championship. Washington shut out five of seven opponents, and outscored opponents by a total of 227 to 9. William J. Coyle was the team captain.

== Schedule ==
Date	Opponent	Site	Result	Attendance	Source
October 2	Lincoln High School*	Denny Field; Seattle, WA	W 42–0	1,000	
October 14	Fort Worden*	Denny Field; Seattle, WA	W 90–0	1,000	
October 21	Puget Sound*	Denny Field; Seattle, WA	W 35–0	2,000	
October 28	vs. Idaho	Natatorium Park; Spokane, WA	W 17–0	1,100	
November 4	Oregon Agricultural	Denny Field; Seattle, WA	W 34–0	4,000	
November 18	vs. Oregon	Multnomah Field; Portland, OR (rivalry)	W 29–3	8,000	
November 30	Washington State	Denny Field; Seattle, WA (rivalry)	W 30–6	6,000	
*Non-conference game; Source:
