= 1917 Arizona Wildcats football team =

American college football season

1917 Arizona Wildcats football
- Conference: Independent
- Record: 3–2
- Head coach: Pop McKale (4th season)
- Captain: Bill McGowen
- Home stadium: University field

1917 Western college football independents records
	Conf.			Overall
Team	W	L	T	W		L		T
Saint Mary's		–		8	–	1	–	1
Hawaii		–		4	–	0	–	1
USC		–		4	–	2	–	1
New Mexico A&M		–		4	–	2	–	0
Arizona		–		3	–	2	–	0
New Mexico		–		1	–	2	–	0
University Farm		–		1	–	2	–	0
Nevada		–		1	–	3	–	0
Montana		–		1	–	4	–	0

The 1917 Arizona Wildcats football team represented the University of Arizona as an independent during the 1917 college football season. In their fourth season under head coach Pop McKale, the Wildcats compiled a 3–2 record and outscored all opponents, 118 to 41. The team captain was Bill McGowen.

== Schedule ==
Date	Time	Opponent	Site	Result	Attendance	Source
October 13	3:30 p.m.	11th Field Artillery Regiment officers	University field; Tucson, AZ	L 0–3	800	
October 20	2:30 p.m.	at USC	Bovard Field; Los Angeles, CA	L 6–31	2,000	
November 3	3:00 p.m.	New Mexico A&M	Fair ground gridiron; Tucson, AZ	W 26–7		
November 17	3:00 p.m.	11th Field Artillery Regiment soldiers	University field; Tucson, AZ	W 41–0		
November 29	3:00 p.m.	Whittier	University field; Tucson, AZ	W 45–0		
