= David L. Crawford =

American entomologist and sports coach

Biographical details
- Born: March 7, 1889; Hermosillo, Mexico
- Died: January 18, 1974 (aged 84); Moorestown Township, New Jersey, U.S.

Coaching career (HC unless noted)

Football
- 1917–1919: Hawaii

Basketball
- 1918–1919: Hawaii

Head coaching record
- Overall: 11–1–2 (football); 2–5 (basketball)

David Livingston Crawford (March 7, 1889 – January 18, 1974) was an American entomologist, coach of football and basketball, and college professor and administrator.

== Biography ==
He served as the head football coach at the University of Hawaii from 1917 to 1919. He also coached the Hawaii basketball team during the 1918–19 season. Crawford attended Pomona College and Cornell University. He taught at Pomona before coming to Hawaii, where he was head of the entomology department. Crawford served as president of the University of Hawaii from 1927 to 1941. He was the president of Doane College—now known as Doane University—in Crete, Nebraska from 1948 to 1954. Crawford died on January 18, 1974, of Parkinson's disease, at a nursing home in Moorestown Township, New Jersey.

== Head coaching record ==
=== Football ===
Year	Team	Overall	Conference	Standing	Bowl/playoffs
Hawaii Deans (Independent) (1917–1919)
1917	Hawaii	4–0–1			
1918	Hawaii	3–1			
1919	Hawaii	4–0–1			
Hawaii:		11–1–2			
Total:		11–1–2			
