= Jerry Nissen =

American football player and coach (1884–1954)

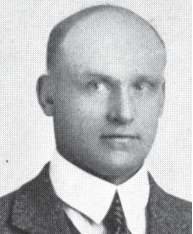
- c. 1915

Biographical details
- Born: December 7, 1884; Denmark
- Died: April 18, 1954 (aged 69); Seattle, Washington, U.S.
- Education: Washington State

Playing career

Football
- 1904–1907: Washington State
- Position: Halfback

Coaching career (HC unless noted)

Football
- 1908–1909: Idaho (assistant)
- 1913: Washington State (assistant)
- 1914: Montana (assistant)
- 1915–1917: Montana

Basketball
- 1914–1918: Montana

Head coaching record
- Overall: 7–7–3 (football); 21–16 (basketball)

Jerry Nissen (December 7, 1884 – April 18, 1954) was a college football player and coach. He served as the head football coach at the University of Montana from 1915 to 1917, compiling a record of 7–7–3. Nissen was also the head basketball coach at Montana from 1914 to 1918, tallying a mark of 21–16. Nissen played college football at Washington State University. He was an assistant football coach at the University of Idaho from 1908 to 1909 and at his alma mater, Washington State, in 1913.

After leaving coaching, Nissen worked as an inspector for the Washington State Department of Highways, retiring around 1951. He died at the age of 69, on April 18, 1954, in Seattle, Washington, following a long illness. Buried in Evergreen Washelli Memorial Park.

== Head coaching record ==
=== Football ===
Year	Team	Overall	Conference	Standing	Bowl/playoffs
Montana Grizzlies (Independent) (1915–1917)
1915	Montana	2–2–2			
1916	Montana	4–1–1			
1917	Montana	1–4			
Montana:		7–7–3			
Total:		7–7–3			
