= 1914 Washington State football team =

American college football season

1914 Washington State football
- Conference: Northwest Conference
- Record: 2–4 (2–3 Northwest)
- Head coach: John R. Bender (5th season)
- Captain: Emory Alvord
- Home stadium: Rogers Field

1914 Northwest Conference football standings
| | Conf. | | | | | Overall |
| Team | W | | L | | T | W | | L | | T |
|---|---|---|---|---|---|---|---|---|---|---|
| Washington $ | 3 | – | 0 | – | 1 | 6 | – | 0 | – | 1 |
| Oregon Agricultural | 2 | – | 0 | – | 2 | 7 | – | 0 | – | 2 |
| Oregon | 3 | – | 1 | – | 1 | 4 | – | 2 | – | 1 |
| Washington State | 2 | – | 3 | – | 0 | 2 | – | 4 | – | 0 |
| Idaho | 1 | – | 3 | – | 0 | 2 | – | 3 | – | 1 |
| Whitman | 0 | – | 4 | – | 0 | 0 | – | 4 | – | 0 |
$ – Conference champion

The 1914 Washington State football team was an American football team that represented Washington State College—now known as Washington State University—as a member of the Northwest Conference during the 1914 college football season. Led by John R. Bender in his fifth and final season as head coach, Washington State compiled an overall record of 2–4 with a mark of 2–3 in conference play, placing fourth in the Northwest Conference. The team played home games on campus, at Rogers Field in Pullman, Washington.

== Schedule ==
| Date | Opponent | Site | Result | Attendance | Source |
|---|---|---|---|---|---|
| October 6 | at Montana* | Dornblaser Field; Missoula, MT | L 0–10 | | |
| October 17 | vs. Oregon | Multnomah Field; Portland, OR | L 0–7 | | |
| October 24 | Oregon Agricultural | Rogers Field; Pullman, WA | L 0–7 | | |
| November 7 | Idaho^{†} | Rogers Field; Pullman, WA (rivalry) | W 3–0 | 4,000 | |
| November 14 | vs. Whitman | Recreation Park; Spokane, WA | W 7–6 | 1,500 | |
| November 26 | at Washington | Denny Field; Seattle, WA (rivalry) | L 0–45 | 6,000 | |
*Non-conference game; ^{†}Homecoming
