= 1913 Washington football team =

American college football season

1913 Washington football

Northwest Conference champion
- Conference: Northwest Conference
- Record: 7–0 (4–0 Northwest)
- Head coach: Gil Dobie (6th season)
- Captain: Herman Anderson
- Home stadium: Denny Field

1913 Northwest Conference football standings
	Conf.					Overall
Team	W		L		T	W		L		T
Washington $	4	–	0	–	0	7	–	0	–	0
Oregon Agricultural	3	–	1	–	1	3	–	2	–	3
Idaho	2	–	2	–	0	3	–	3	–	0
Oregon	1	–	1	–	1	3	–	3	–	1
Washington State	1	–	3	–	0	4	–	4	–	0
Whitman	0	–	4	–	0	1	–	4	–	0
$ – Conference champion

The 1913 Washington football team was an American football team that represented the University of Washington as a member of the Northwest Conference during the 1913 college football season. In its sixth season under coach Gil Dobie, the team compiled an overall record of 7–0 with a mark of 4–0 in conference play, winning the Northwest Conference title. Washington and outscored its opponents by a combined total of 266 to 20. Herman Anderson was the team captain.

== Schedule ==
Date	Opponent	Site	Result	Attendance	Source
September 27	Everett High School*	Denny Field; Seattle, WA	W 26–0	1,500	
October 11	Bremerton Sailors*	Denny Field; Seattle, WA	W 23–7	1,500	
October 18	Whitworth*	Denny Field; Seattle, WA	W 100–0	3,000	
October 25	Oregon Agricultural	Denny Field; Seattle, WA	W 47–0	6,000	
November 1	Whitman	Denny Field; Seattle, WA	W 40–6	4,000	
November 15	vs. Oregon	Multnomah Field; Portland, OR (rivalry)	W 10–7	8,000	
November 27	Washington State	Denny Field; Seattle, WA (rivalry)	W 20–0	6,000	
*Non-conference game; Source:
