= Frank E. Wood =

Biographical details
- Born: February 26, 1891; Wamego, Kansas, U.S.
- Died: January 1, 1972 (aged 80); Creswell, Oregon, U.S.
- Education: Baker (KS) (BA, 1912); Kansas (AM, 1914); Chicago (Ph.D., 1920)

Coaching career (HC unless noted)
- 1917: New Mexico

Head coaching record
- Overall: 1–2

Frank Edwin Wood (February 26, 1891 – January 1, 1972), incorrectly identified as Frank E. Worth in current media guides, was an American football coach and mathematics professor.

== Education ==
Wood received a B.A. from Baker University in Baldwin City, Kansas in 1912, an AM degree from the University of Kansas in 1914, and a Ph.D. from the University of Chicago in 1920.

== Coaching career ==
He served as the head football coach at the University of New Mexico in 1917, accepting duties on short notice while regular coach Ralph Hutchinson was called into military service during World War I.

== Academic career ==
Wood served as a faculty member at a number of institutions, including Northwestern University, Princeton University, the University of Oregon, as well as the University of New Mexico.

== Football statistician ==
Wood, billed as a "nationally known football statistician," wrote a football column for the Wisconsin State Journal carried by the Central Press Association.

=== National championship selections ===
In his column, Wood made the following national championship selections for college football.

Season	Champion	Record
1928	Georgia Tech	10–0
1929	Utah	7–0
1930	Alabama	10–1
1931	Tulane	11–1
1932	Colgate	9–0
1933	Princeton	9–0
1934	Alabama	10–0

== Head coaching record ==
Year	Team	Overall	Conference	Standing	Bowl/playoffs
University of New Mexico (Independent) (1917)
1917	University of New Mexico	1–2			
University of New Mexico:		1–2			
Total:		1–2			
