= 1913 Oregon Webfoots football team =

American college football season

1913 Oregon Webfoots football
- Conference: Northwest Conference
- Record: 3–3–1 (1–3–1 Northwest)
- Head coach: Hugo Bezdek (2nd season)
- Captain: Robert Bradshaw
- Home stadium: Kincaid Field

1913 Northwest Conference football standings
	Conf.					Overall
Team	W		L		T	W		L		T
Washington $	4	–	0	–	0	7	–	0	–	0
Oregon Agricultural	3	–	1	–	1	3	–	2	–	3
Idaho	2	–	2	–	0	3	–	3	–	0
Oregon	1	–	1	–	1	3	–	3	–	1
Washington State	1	–	3	–	0	4	–	4	–	0
Whitman	0	–	4	–	0	1	–	4	–	0
$ – Conference champion

The 1913 Oregon Webfoots football team represented the University of Oregon as a member of the Northwest Conference during the 1913 college football season. Hugo Bezdek returned to coach the team. Under his coaching in 1906, the team posted a 5–0–1 record, but he left at the end of that season. Returning in 1913, "he stayed five seasons and took Oregon to new heights." The 1913 Webfoots compiled an overall record of 3–3–1 with a mark of 1–3–1 in conference play, tying for third place in the Northwest Conference.

== Schedule ==
Date	Opponent	Site	Result	Attendance	Source
October 4	Oregon alumni*	Kincaid Field; Eugene, OR	W 42–3		
October 18	Bremerton (Navy)*	Kincaid Field; Eugene, OR	W 43–6		
October 25	Idaho	Kincaid Field; Eugene, OR	W 27–0		
November 1	at Willamette	Salem, OR	L 3–6		
November 8	vs. Oregon Agricultural	Albany, OR (rivalry)	T 10–10		
November 15	vs. Washington	Multnomah Field; Portland, OR (rivalry)	L 7–10	8,000	
November 27	at Multnomah Athletic Club	Multnomah Field; Portland, OR	L 0–19		
*Non-conference game; Source:

== Roster ==
Roster for the November 8 rivalry game against the Oregon Agricultural College Aggies. This published roster from the Emerald is highly unusual for the era by including height, age, and experience.
