= 1917 Oregon Agricultural Aggies football team =

American college football season

1917 Oregon Agricultural Aggies football
- Conference: Northwest Conference, Pacific Coast Conference
- Record: 4–2–1 (2–1–1 Northwest, 1–2–1 PCC)
- Head coach: Joseph Pipal (2nd season)
- Captain: Meier Newman
- Home stadium: Bell Field

1917 Northwest Conference football standings
	Conf.					Overall
Team	W		L		T	W		L		T
Washington State $	5	–	0	–	0	6	–	0	–	1
Oregon Agricultural	2	–	1	–	1	4	–	2	–	1
Washington	1	–	1	–	1	1	–	2	–	1
Oregon	1	–	2	–	0	3	–	3	–	0
Idaho	1	–	3	–	0	2	–	3	–	0
Whitman	0	–	3	–	0	1	–	4	–	0
$ – Conference champion

1917 Pacific Coast Conference football standings
	Conf.					Overall
Team	W		L		T	W		L		T
Washington State $	3	–	0	–	0	6	–	0	–	1
California	2	–	1	–	0	5	–	5	–	1
Oregon Agricultural	1	–	2	–	1	4	–	2	–	1
Oregon	1	–	2	–	0	3	–	3	–	0
Washington	0	–	2	–	1	1	–	2	–	1
$ – Conference champion

The 1917 Oregon Agricultural Aggies football team represented Oregon Agricultural College (OAC)—now known as Oregon State University as a member of the Northwest Conference and the Pacific Coast Conference (PCC) during the 1917 college football season. In their second and final season under head coach Joseph Pipal, the Aggies compiled an overall record of 4–2–1 record and outscored their opponents by a combined total of 83 to 33. Oregon Agricultural had a record of 2–1–1 in Northwest Conference play, placing second, and 1–2–1 against PCC opponents, finishing third. The team played home games at Bell Field in Corvallis, Oregon.

== Schedule ==
Date	Opponent	Site	Result	Attendance	Source
October 13	Vancouver Barracks Field Hospital Corps*	Bell Field; Corvallis, OR	W 34–0		
October 20	vs. Idaho	Round-Up Park; Pendleton, OR	W 26–6		
October 27	at California	California Field; Berkeley, CA	L 3–14		
November 3	Multnomah Athletic Club*	Bell Field; Corvallis, OR	W 6–0		
November 10	Washington State	Bell Field; Corvallis, OR	L 0–6	3,000	
November 17	at Washington	Denny Field; Seattle, WA	T 0–0	3,000	
November 29	vs. Oregon	Multnomah Field; Portland, OR (rivalry)	W 14–7		
*Non-conference game; Source:

Homecoming game against Washington State at Bell Field in Corvallis. OAC on offense, wearing solid black jerseys.
