= Louis Pinkham =

American football player and coach (1888–1919)

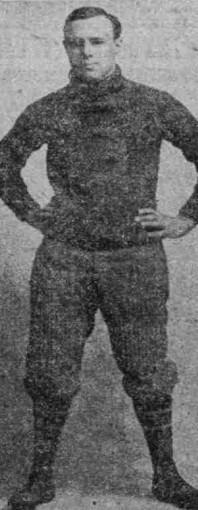

Biographical details
- Born: January 1888; Washington, U.S.
- Died: February 5, 1919 (aged 31); France

Playing career
- 1907–1910: Oregon
- Position: Tackle

Coaching career (HC unless noted)
- 1910–1911: Oregon (assistant)
- 1912: Oregon

Head coaching record
- Overall: 3–4

Louis H. Pinkham Jr. (January 1888 – February 5, 1919) was an American college football player and coach. He played football at the University of Oregon from 1907 to 1910 as a tackle and served as the head football coach at Oregon in 1912, compiling a record of 3–4. He also served as an assistant coach to Oregon in 1910 and 1911. By 1916, Pinkham was working as a land surveyor and civil engineer for the United States Federal Government. Pinkam was commissioned a first lieutenant and served with the United States Army during World War I. He participated in the Meuse-Argonne Offensive and the Second Battle of the Marne. Pinkham died of bronchopneumonia, in France on February 5, 1919.

== Head coaching record ==
Year	Team	Overall	Conference	Standing	Bowl/playoffs
Oregon Webfoots (Northwest Conference) (1912)
1912	Oregon	3–4	2–3	T–4th	
Oregon:		3–4	2–3		
Total:		3–4			
