= Vincent Borleske =

American football and baseball player (1887–1957)

Biographical details
- Born: January 8, 1887; Albert Lea, Minnesota, U.S.
- Died: January 2, 1957 (aged 69); Walla Walla, Washington, U.S.

Playing career

Football
- 1907–1909: Whitman

Baseball
- c. 1907–1910: Whitman
- 1911: Brandon Angels
- 1912: Edmonton Grey Birds
- Positions: Halfback; Pitcher (baseball)

Coaching career (HC unless noted)

Football
- 1910–1911: Broadway HS (WA)
- 1912–1914: Lincoln HS (OR)
- 1915–1946: Whitman

Basketball
- 1910–1912: Broadway HS (WA)
- 1912–1915: Lincoln HS (OR)
- 1915–1947: Whitman

Baseball
- 1911–1912: Broadway HS (WA)
- 1913–1915: Lincoln HS (OR)
- 1916–1947: Whitman

Administrative career (AD unless noted)
- 1912–1915: Lincoln HS (OR)
- 1915–1947: Whitman

Head coaching record
- Overall: 82–118–10 (college football)

Accomplishments and honors

Championships
- 1 Northwest Conference (1921); 3 NWC (1928, 1930–1931)

Raymond Vincent "Nig" Borleske (January 8, 1887 – January 2, 1957) was an American professional baseball player, college football player and coach, and athletics administrator. He served as the head football coach at Whitman College in Walla Walla, Washington from 1915 to 1946.

Borleske was born in Albert Lea, Minnesota. He played football and baseball at Whitman from 1907 to 1909. He played in minor league baseball from 1910 to 1912, pitching for two teams in the Western Canada League.

Borleske began his coaching career in 1910, when he was hired as the football, basketball, and baseball coach at Broadway High School in Seattle. In 1912, he was appointed coach at Lincoln High School in Portland, Oregon. Three years later, in 1915, he returned to Whitman, succeeding Archie Hahn as athletic director and coach. Borleske also coached basketball and baseball at Whitman before leaving the school in 1947.

Borleske was the mayor of Walla Walla from 1948 to 1954. He died in Walla Walla on January 2, 1957, of a heart attack. He was the manager of the Marcus Whitman Hotel there at the time of his death. Borleske's brother, Stanley Borleske, was also a college athlete and coach.

Borleske was one of a number of American athletes in the first half of the 20th century to be nicknamed "Nig", being referred to as such in newspaper reports as early as September 1907.

== Head coaching record ==
=== College football ===
Year	Team	Overall	Conference	Standing	Bowl/playoffs
Whitman Fighting Missionaries (Northwest Conference) (1915–1925)
1915	Whitman	1–5–1	0–4–1	6th	
1916	Whitman	1–5	1–3	5th	
1917	Whitman	1–4	0–3	6th	
1918	No team—World War I				
1919	Whitman	0–2–1	0–0–1	T–5th	
1920	Whitman	3–2	2–1	3rd	
1921	Whitman	4–2	3–0	1st	
1922	Whitman	2–4–1	2–2	3rd	
1923	Whitman	1–5	1–3	7th	
1924	Whitman	1–5	1–5	9th	
1925	Whitman	4–3	2–3	T–3rd	
Whitman Fighting Missionaries (Northwest Conference) (1926–1946)
1926	Whitman	2–4–1	1–1–1	T–3rd	
1927	Whitman	5–4	4–1	2nd	
1928	Whitman	5–4	4–0	1st	
1929	Whitman	5–5	4–1	2nd	
1930	Whitman	4–2–1	3–0–1	1st	
1931	Whitman	4–5	3–1	1st	
1932	Whitman	3–5	3–2	T–3rd	
1933	Whitman	3–5–1	1–3–1	5th	
1934	Whitman	1–6	0–5	T–6th	
1935	Whitman	6–2–1	3–2–1	3rd	
1936	Whitman	4–3–1	3–2–1	T–3rd	
1937	Whitman	3–5	2–3	4th	
1938	Whitman	2–4–1	1–3–1	4th	
1939	Whitman	4–3	3–2	3rd	
1940	Whitman	2–4–1	1–3–1	5th	
1941	Whitman	5–1	4–1	2nd	
1942	Whitman	2–5	2–2	3rd	
1943	Whitman	2–4			
1944	Whitman	0–5			
1945	No team—World War II				
1946	Whitman	2–5	1–5	6th	
Whitman:		82–118–10	55–61–9		
Total:		82–118–10			
National championship Conference title Conference division title or championship game berth
