= 1913 Oregon Agricultural Aggies football team =

American college football season

1913 Oregon Agricultural Aggies football
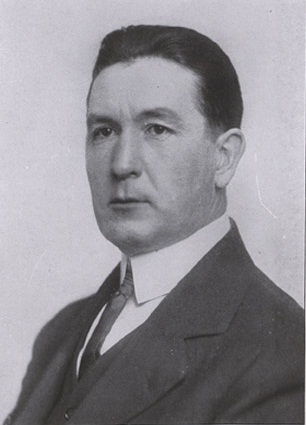
- Conference: Northwest Conference
- Record: 3–2–3 (3–1–1 Northwest)
- Head coach: E. J. Stewart (1st season)
- Captain: James Shaw
- Home stadium: Bell Field

1913 Northwest Conference football standings
	Conf.					Overall
Team	W		L		T	W		L		T
Washington $	4	–	0	–	0	7	–	0	–	0
Oregon Agricultural	3	–	1	–	1	3	–	2	–	3
Idaho	2	–	2	–	0	3	–	3	–	0
Oregon	1	–	1	–	1	3	–	3	–	1
Washington State	1	–	3	–	0	4	–	4	–	0
Whitman	0	–	4	–	0	1	–	4	–	0
$ – Conference champion

The 1913 Oregon Agricultural Aggies football team represented Oregon Agricultural College (OAC)—now known as Oregon State University—as a member of the Northwest Conference during the 1913 college football season. In their first season under head coach E. J. Stewart, the Aggies compiled an overall record of 3–2–3 record with a mark of 3–1–1 against conference opponents, placing second in the Northwest Conference, and were outscored by their opponents by a combined total of 75 to 59. Against major opponents, the Aggies lost to Washington (0–47), tied Oregon (10–10), and defeated Washington State (10–2) and Idaho (3–0). The team played its home games at Bell Field in Corvallis, Oregon. James Shaw was the team captain.

== Schedule ==
Date	Opponent	Site	Result	Attendance	Source
September 27	O.A.C. alumni*	Bell Field; Corvallis, OR	T 0–0		
October 4	at Multnomah Athletic Club*	Multnomah Field; Portland, OR	L 0–6		
October 11	Multnomah Athletic Club*	Bell Field; Corvallis, OR	T 7–7		
October 18	at Whitman	Walla Walla, WA	W 29–3		
October 25	at Washington	Denny Field; Seattle, WA	L 0–47		
November 8	vs. Oregon	Albany, OR (rivalry)	T 10–10		
November 15	Washington State	Bell Field; Corvallis, OR	W 10–2		
November 27	Idaho	Bell Field; Corvallis, OR	W 3–0		
*Non-conference game

== Roster ==
Roster for the November 8 rivalry game against the University of Oregon. This published roster is highly unusual for the era by including height, age, and experience.
