= 1917 University of New Mexico football team =

American college football season

1917 University of New Mexico football
- Conference: Independent
- Record: 1–2
- Head coach: Frank E. Wood (1st season)
- Home stadium: University Field

1917 Western college football independents records
	Conf.			Overall
Team	W	L	T	W		L		T
Saint Mary's		–		8	–	1	–	1
Hawaii		–		4	–	0	–	1
USC		–		4	–	2	–	1
New Mexico A&M		–		4	–	2	–	0
Arizona		–		3	–	2	–	0
New Mexico		–		1	–	2	–	0
University Farm		–		1	–	2	–	0
Nevada		–		1	–	3	–	0
Montana		–		1	–	4	–	0

The 1917 University of New Mexico football team was an American football team that represented the University of New Mexico as an independent during the 1917 college football season. In its first and only season under head coach Frank E. Wood, the team compiled a 1–2 record and were outscored by a total of 129 to 47. George White was the team captain.

== Schedule ==
Date	Opponent	Site	Result	Source
October 20	Menaul School	Hopewell Field; Albuquerque, NM	W 38–0	
November 3	Albuquerque High School	Albuquerque, NM	L 6–19	
November 29	at New Mexico A&M	Miller Field; Las Cruces, NM (rivalry)	L 3–110	
