= 1917 Oregon Webfoots football team =

American college football season

1917 Oregon Webfoots football
- Oregon team at Kincaid Field
- Conference: Northwest Conference, Pacific Coast Conference
- Record: 3–3 (1–2 Northwest, 1–2 PCC)
- Head coach: Hugo Bezdek (6th season)
- Captain: Ray Couch
- Home stadium: Kincaid Field

1917 Northwest Conference football standings
	Conf.					Overall
Team	W		L		T	W		L		T
Washington State $	5	–	0	–	0	6	–	0	–	1
Oregon Agricultural	2	–	1	–	1	4	–	2	–	1
Washington	1	–	1	–	1	1	–	2	–	1
Oregon	1	–	2	–	0	3	–	3	–	0
Idaho	1	–	3	–	0	2	–	3	–	0
Whitman	0	–	3	–	0	1	–	4	–	0
$ – Conference champion

1917 Pacific Coast Conference football standings
	Conf.					Overall
Team	W		L		T	W		L		T
Washington State $	3	–	0	–	0	6	–	0	–	1
California	2	–	1	–	0	5	–	5	–	1
Oregon Agricultural	1	–	2	–	1	4	–	2	–	1
Oregon	1	–	2	–	0	3	–	3	–	0
Washington	0	–	2	–	1	1	–	2	–	1
$ – Conference champion

The 1917 Oregon Webfoots football team represented the University of Oregon as a member of the Northwest Conference and the Pacific Coast Conference (PCC) during the 1917 college football season. In their sixth and final season under head coach Hugo Bezdek, the Webfoots compiled an overall record of 3–3 and were outscored by their opponents 73 to 60. Oregon had a record of 1–2 and placed fourth in both conferences. The team played home games at Kincaid Field in Eugene, Oregon.

The 14–0 victory over Willamette noted in the Oregon media guide was actually played by the freshmen, and not varsity squad.

== Schedule ==
Date	Opponent	Site	Result	Source
October 13	at Multnomah Athletic Club*	Multnomah Field; Portland, OR	W 14–7	
October 20	at Washington State	Rogers Field; Pullman, WA	L 3–26	
October 27	Idaho	Kincaid Field; Eugene, OR	W 14–0	
November 3	Mare Island Marines*	Multnomah Field; Portland, OR	L 0–27	
November 17	California	Kincaid Field; Eugene, OR	W 21–0	
November 29	vs. Oregon Agricultural	Multnomah Field; Portland, OR (rivalry)	L 7–14	
*Non-conference game; Source:
