= John R. Bender =

American football player and athletics coach (1882–1928)

Biographical details
- Born: May 14, 1882; Sutton, Nebraska, U.S.
- Died: July 24, 1928 (aged 46); Houston, Texas, U.S.

Playing career

Football
- 1900–1904: Nebraska

Baseball
- 1903: McCook Braves
- 1905: Little Rock Travelers
- 1906: Omaha Rourkes
- 1907: Portland Beavers
- 1907: Pueblo Indians
- 1907: Spokane Indians
- 1908: Butte Miners
- 1908: Aberdeen/Grays Harbor Grays
- 1908–1909: Seattle Siwashes
- 1909: Tacoma Tigers
- Positions: Halfback (football); Catcher (baseball)

Coaching career (HC unless noted)

Football
- 1905: SD State Normal
- 1906–1907: Washington State
- 1908–1909: Haskell
- 1910–1911: Saint Louis
- 1912–1914: Washington State
- 1915: Kansas State
- 1916–1920: Tennessee
- 1922–1924: Knoxville HS (TN)

Basketball
- 1907–1908: Washington State
- 1916–1917: Tennessee
- 1919–1921: Tennessee

Baseball
- 1907–1908: Washington State
- 1913–1915: Washington State
- 1917: Tennessee
- 1920: Tennessee

Head coaching record
- Overall: 67–32–7 (football); 41–18 (basketball); 85–33–1 (baseball)

Accomplishments and honors

Championships
- Football; 1 SIAA (1916)

Awards
- Third-team All-American (1904)

John Reinhold "Chief" Bender (May 14, 1882 – July 24, 1928) was an American football player and coach of football, basketball and baseball. He served as the head football coach at Black Hills State University (1905), Washington State University (1906–1907, 1912–1914), Haskell Indian Nations University (1908–1909), St. Louis University (1910–1911), Kansas State University (1915), and the University of Tennessee (1916–1920), compiling a career record of 67–32–7. He is one of the few college football head coaches to have non-consecutive tenure at the same school. Bender was also the head basketball coach at Washington State (1907–1908) and Tennessee (1916–1917, 1919–1921), and the head baseball coach at Washington State (1907–1908, 1913–1915) and Tennessee (1917, 1920).

== Playing career ==
A native of Sutton, Nebraska, Bender played college football at the University of Nebraska from 1900 to 1904. Due to loose eligibility standards at the time, he played five seasons for Nebraska. Bender starred at halfback for undefeated teams in 1902 and 1903, served as captain of the 1903 team, and graduated as the leading scorer in Nebraska history. However, tarnishing his image to some, one story recounts that he refused to play against the national powerhouse Minnesota until Nebraska paid him an acceptable amount of money.

Bender played minor league baseball for the McCook Braves, Little Rock Travelers, Omaha Rourkes, Portland Beavers, Pueblo Indians, Spokane Indians, Butte Miners, Aberdeen/Grays Harbor Grays, Seattle Siwashes, and Tacoma Tigers.

== Coaching career ==
After graduating from Nebraska, Bender served as head football coach at South Dakota State Normal School (now Black Hills State University) for one season before moving on to Washington State, where he was the head football and basketball coach between 1906 and 1908 and he posted a 13–1 record in football. His 1907–08 basketball squad also recorded a 12–3 mark, by far the best in school history to that point. Between 1908 and 1909, Bender coached football at Haskell Indian Nations University and from 1910 to 1911 he coached football at Saint Louis University. During the 1911 season, reporters in St. Louis commented that Bender looked like a charm doll called a Billiken, which were a national fad at the time. His squad became known as "Bender's Billikens," which is the genesis of SLU's athletic nickname. Bender returned to coach Washington State football from 1912 to 1914.

In 1915, Bender was hired as head football coach at Kansas State. In his one season at K-State, his team posted a mediocre 3–4–1 record. However, Bender left a lasting mark by instituting two long-term traditions at Kansas State in 1915: starting the annual homecoming event and adopting the nickname Wildcats.

Prior to the 1916 season, Bender moved to the University of Tennessee. At the same time, the sitting head coach at Tennessee, Zora Clevenger moved to Kansas State, in effect trading jobs with Bender. Bender served as head football coach at the University of Tennessee from 1916 to 1920. During his tenure, he compiled a record of 18–5–4 (.741). His best season came in 1916, when his team went 8–0–1, marred only by a scoreless tie against Kentucky. Tennessee did not field football teams in 1917 and 1918, and Bender posted his worst record in 1919, when his team went 3–3–3. In his final season, he went 7–2 and recorded Tennessee's 100th victory in football, with the two losses coming against Vanderbilt and Mississippi State. He is also credited with installing the short punt formation at Tennessee.

While at Tennessee, Bender also served as basketball coach for the 1917, 1920, and 1921 seasons, recording a 29–15 mark.

== Later career ==
In 1922, Bender was appointed director of physical education for the Knoxville public schools. He also coached the Knoxville High School football team. He resigned on March 30, 1925 after the school department's safety director informed the school board that the families of two elementary school students (an 11-year old girl and a 14-year-old girl) had accused Bender of inappropriate behavior and Bender had paid them $4,500 in exchange for them not pressing the matter. Two days later, the local prosecutor began an investigation into the accusations as well as claims that Bender had been extorted by the families of his two accusers. On April 28, Bender officially filed an extortion complaint against the fathers and a grandfather the two girls. The following day, the father of another student accused Bender of attempting to sexual assault his daughter. On July 14, 1925, a grand jury charged Bender with assault with intent upon two of his former students. Two weeks later, the parents of the two girls requested that the charges be dropped. The prosecutor asked that the charges be retired indefinitely, as he could not proceed without the complaining witnesses. Bender also withdrew his extortion complaints.

After his resignation, Bender worked as the physical director at the Whittle Springs Hotel and Spa in Knoxville. On May 19, 1925, he was named freshman coach at Texas A&M University. He also worked as an umpire in the Western League during his time in College Station. He was a faculty member at the University of Texas at Austin during the 1927 summer session.

On July 15, 1927, Governor John W. Martin announced Bender as Florida's next director of physical and health education. Three days later, he notified Bender that he had been hired in error, as the superintendent of public instruction, not the governor, was responsible for making the appointment.

Bender served as a physical education instructor at the University of Houston during the 1927–28 academic year. During this time, he also coached a volunteer football squad of students for the school. He suggested they be named the Cougars after one of his former teams, Washington State. The school adopted the mascot and nickname. In turn, the college's newspaper, The Cougar, followed suit when choosing its name. The university's athletics teams remain known as the Houston Cougars today.

Bender died on July 24, 1928 at his home in Houston while recovering from surgery.

== Head coaching record ==
=== Football ===
Year	Team	Overall	Conference	Standing
South Dakota State Normal (Independent) (1905)
1905	South Dakota State Normal	2–1		
South Dakota State Normal:		2–1		
Washington State (Independent) (1906–1907)
1906	Washington State	6–0		
1907	Washington State	7–1		
Haskell Indians (Independent) (1908–1909)
1908	Haskell	3–5–1		
1909	Haskell	7–2		
Haskell:		10–7–1		
Saint Louis Billikens (Independent) (1910–1911)
1910	Saint Louis	7–2		
1911	Saint Louis	6–1–1		
Saint Louis:		13–3–1		
Washington State (Northwest Conference) (1912–1914)
1912	Washington State	2–3	2–3	T–4th
1913	Washington State	4–4	1–3	5th
1914	Washington State	2–4	2–3	4th
Washington State:		21–12	5–9	
Kansas State Aggies (Missouri Valley Conference) (1915)
1915	Kansas State	3–4–1	0–2–1	7th
Kansas State:		3–4–1	0–2–1	
Tennessee Volunteers (Southern Intercollegiate Athletic Association) (1916–1920)
1916	Tennessee	8–0–1	6–0–1	T–1st
1919	Tennessee	3–3–3	0–3–2	20th
1920	Tennessee	7–2	4–2	T–8th
Tennessee:		18–5–4	10–5–3	
Total:		67–32–7		
National championship Conference title Conference division title or championship game berth
