= 1911 Oregon Webfoots football team =

American college football season

1911 Oregon Webfoots football
- Conference: Northwest Conference
- Record: 3–2 (2–1 Northwest)
- Head coach: Bill Warner (2nd season)
- Captain: William Main
- Home stadium: Kincaid Field

1911 Northwest Conference football standings
	Conf.					Overall
Team	W		L		T	W		L		T
Washington $	4	–	0	–	0	7	–	0	–	0
Oregon Agricultural	2	–	1	–	0	5	–	2	–	0
Oregon	2	–	1	–	0	3	–	2	–	0
Washington State	2	–	3	–	0	3	–	3	–	0
Idaho	1	–	2	–	0	4	–	3	–	0
Whitman	0	–	4	–	0	1	–	4	–	0
$ – Conference champion

The 1911 Oregon Webfoots football team represented the University of Oregon as a member of the Northwest Conference during the 1911 college football season. Led by second-year head coach Bill Warner, the Webfoots compiled an overall record of 3–2 with a mark of 2–1 in conference play, tying for second place in the Northwest Conference. Oregon played home games at Kincaid Field in Eugene, Oregon.

Oregon did not meet rival Oregon Agricultural of Corvallis. The unexpected death of guard Virgil Noland caused the cancellation of the Idaho game on November 25.

== Schedule ==
Date	Opponent	Site	Result	Attendance	Source
October 20	Vancouver Barracks*	Kincaid Field; Eugene, OR	W 36–0		
October 27	at Washington State	Rogers Field; Pullman, WA	W 6–0		
November 4	Whitman	Kincaid Field; Eugene, OR	W 8–5		
November 18	vs. Washington	Multnomah Field; Portland, OR (rivalry)	L 3–29	8,000	
November 25	Idaho	Kincaid Field; Eugene, OR	Canceled		
November 30	at Multnomah Athletic Club*	Multnomah Field; Portland, OR	L 6–17		
*Non-conference game; Source:
