= 1914 Washington football team =

American college football season

1914 Washington football
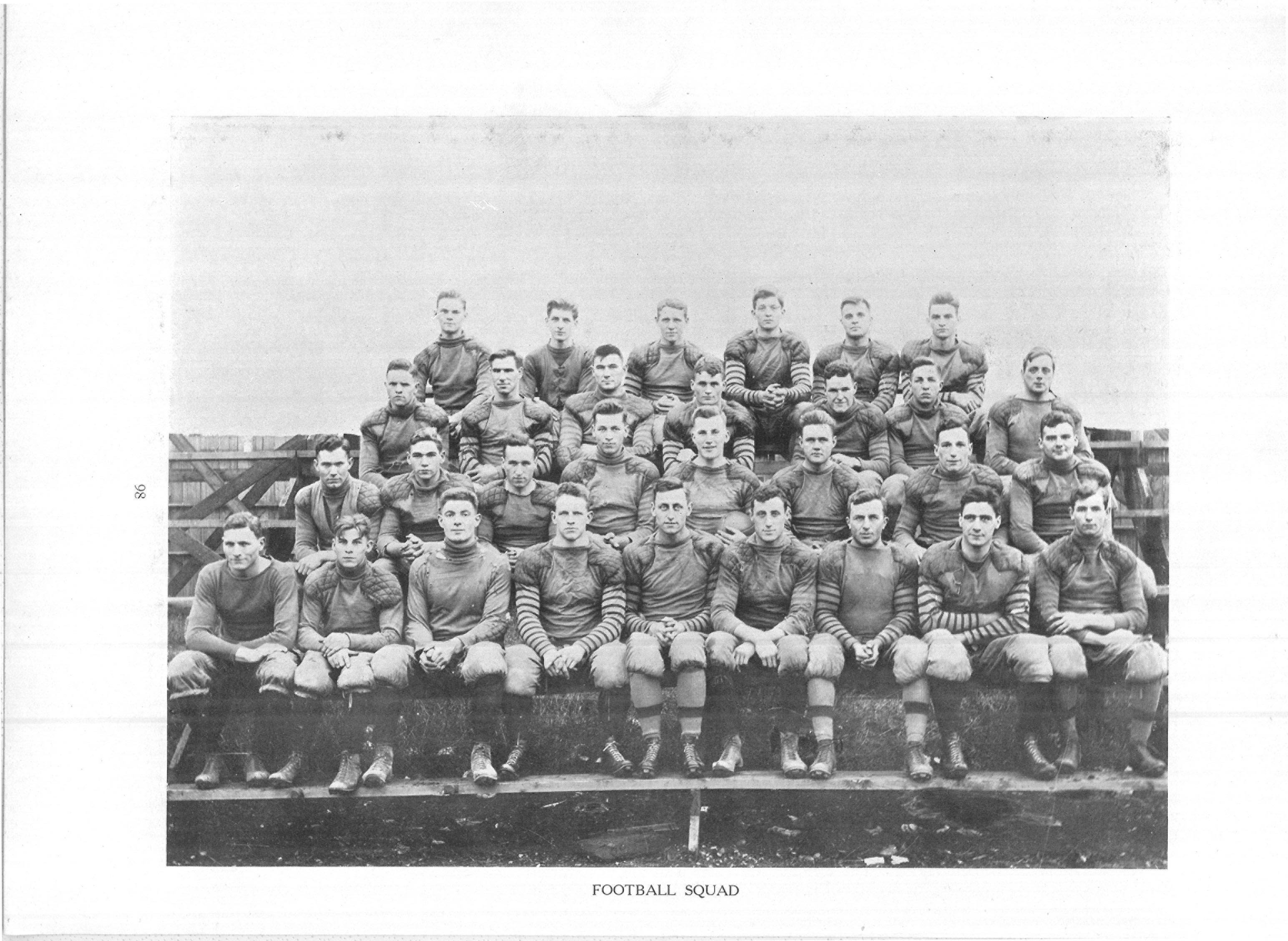

Northwest Conference champion
- Conference: Northwest Conference
- Record: 6–0–1 (3–0–1 Northwest)
- Head coach: Gil Dobie (7th season)
- Captain: Walter Schiel
- Home stadium: Denny Field

1914 Northwest Conference football standings
	Conf.					Overall
Team	W		L		T	W		L		T
Washington $	3	–	0	–	1	6	–	0	–	1
Oregon Agricultural	2	–	0	–	2	7	–	0	–	2
Oregon	3	–	1	–	1	4	–	2	–	1
Washington State	2	–	3	–	0	2	–	4	–	0
Idaho	1	–	3	–	0	2	–	3	–	1
Whitman	0	–	4	–	0	0	–	4	–	0
$ – Conference champion

The 1914 Washington football team was an American football team that represented the University of Washington as a member of the Northwest Conference during the 1914 college football season. In its seventh season under coach Gil Dobie, the team compiled an overall record of 6–0–1 with a mark of 3–0–1 in conference play, winning the Northwest Conference title. Washington shut out five of seven opponents, and outscored all opponents by a combined total of 242 to 13. Walter Schiel was the team captain. Their tie to Oregon State ended their winning streak.

== Schedule ==
Date	Time	Opponent	Site	Result	Attendance	Source
September 26		Aberdeen High School*	Denny Field; Seattle, WA	W 33–6	1,500	
October 3		Washington Park Athletic Cub*	Denny Field; Seattle, WA	W 45–0	2,000	
October 10		Rainier Valley Athletic Cub*	Denny Field; Seattle, WA	W 81–0	2,000	
October 24		Whitman	Denny Field; Seattle, WA	W 28–7	3,000	
October 31	2:30 p.m.	vs. Oregon Agricultural	Albany, OR	T 0–0	2,000	
November 14		Oregon	Denny Field; Seattle, WA (rivalry)	W 10–0	4,000	
November 26		Washington State	Denny Field; Seattle, WA (rivalry)	W 45–0	6,000	
*Non-conference game; Source:
