= 1917 Washington football team =

American college football season

1917 Washington football
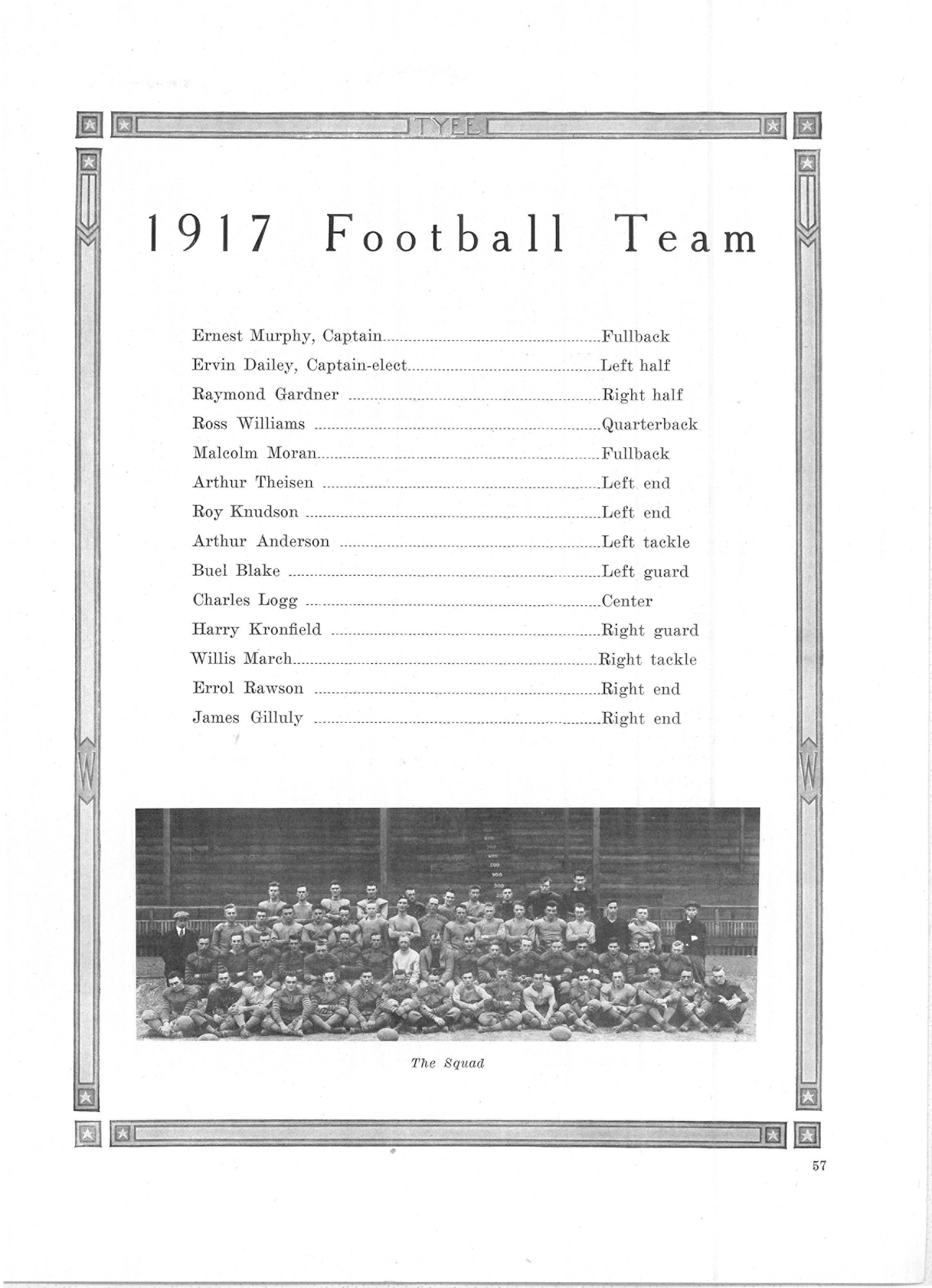
- Conference: Northwest Conference, Pacific Coast Conference
- Record: 1–2–1 (1–1–1 Northwest, 0–2–1 PCC)
- Head coach: Claude J. Hunt (1st season)
- Captain: Ernest Murphy
- Home stadium: Denny Field

1917 Northwest Conference football standings
	Conf.					Overall
Team	W		L		T	W		L		T
Washington State $	5	–	0	–	0	6	–	0	–	1
Oregon Agricultural	2	–	1	–	1	4	–	2	–	1
Washington	1	–	1	–	1	1	–	2	–	1
Oregon	1	–	2	–	0	3	–	3	–	0
Idaho	1	–	3	–	0	2	–	3	–	0
Whitman	0	–	3	–	0	1	–	4	–	0
$ – Conference champion

1917 Pacific Coast Conference football standings
	Conf.					Overall
Team	W		L		T	W		L		T
Washington State $	3	–	0	–	0	6	–	0	–	1
California	2	–	1	–	0	5	–	5	–	1
Oregon Agricultural	1	–	2	–	1	4	–	2	–	1
Oregon	1	–	2	–	0	3	–	3	–	0
Washington	0	–	2	–	1	1	–	2	–	1
$ – Conference champion

The 1917 Washington football team was an American football team that represented the University of Washington as a member of the Northwest Conference and the Pacific Coast Conference (PCC) during the 1917 college football season. In its first season under coach Claude J. Hunt, the team compiled an overall record of 1–2–1 and was outscored by its opponents by a combined total of 47 to 14. Washington had a record of 1–1–1 in Northwest Conference play, placing third, and 0–2–1 against PCC opponents, finishing last out of five teams. Ernest Murphy was the team captain.

The defeat at California was Washington's first loss since 1907, ending a 63-game undefeated run (59 wins and 4 ties). The Thanksgiving Day loss to Washington State at University Field (later Denny Field) was the first home defeat in a decade.

== Schedule ==
Date	Opponent	Site	Result	Attendance	Source
October 20	Whitman	Denny Field; Seattle, WA	W 14–6	2,000	
November 3	at California	California Field; Berkeley, CA	L 0–27	1,000	
November 17	Oregon Agricultural	Denny Field; Seattle, WA	T 0–0	3,000	
November 29	Washington State	Denny Field; Seattle, WA (rivalry)	L 0–14	6,000	
