= Claude J. Hunt =

American college sports coach and athletics administrator

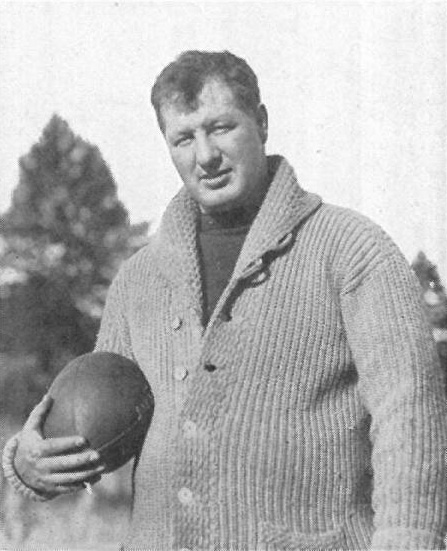
- Hunt pictured in The Tyee 1918, Washington yearbook

Biographical details
- Born: August 11, 1886; Mattoon, Illinois, U.S.
- Died: February 19, 1962 (aged 75); Olmsted County, Minnesota, U.S.

Playing career

Football
- 1909–1910: DePauw
- Position: Guard

Coaching career (HC unless noted)

Football
- 1911–1912: Hillsdale
- 1913–1916: Carleton
- 1917, 1919: Washington
- 1920–1930: Carleton

Basketball
- 1910–1913: Hillsdale
- 1913–1917: Carleton
- 1917–1919: Washington

Administrative career (AD unless noted)
- 1910–1913: Hillsdale
- 1913–1917: Carleton
- 1917–1919: Washington

Head coaching record
- Overall: 87–30–6 (football); 69–39 (basketball)

Accomplishments and honors

Championships
- Football; 1 PCC (1919); 3 MWC (1923, 1925–1926); 1 MIAC (1924)

Claude J. "Jump" Hunt (August 11, 1886 – February 19, 1962) was an American college football and college basketball coach and athletics administrator. He served as the head football coach at Hillsdale College (1911–1912), Carleton College (1913–1916, 1920–1930), and the University of Washington (1917, 1919), compiling a career college football record of 87–30–6.

From 1913 to 1916, Hunt's Carleton football teams were undefeated, allowing only three touchdowns and outscoring opponents 1,196 to 20. In 1916, Carleton traveled to Chicago and beat the Chicago Maroons 7–0 in a shocking upset. Coached by Amos Alonzo Stagg, Chicago was a member of the Western Conference at the time.

Hunt was also the head basketball coach at Hillsdale from 1910 to 1913, at Carleton from 1913 to 1917, and at Washington from 1917 to 1919, tallying a career college basketball mark of 69–39. He played college football at DePauw University, where he was an all-conference guard, graduating in 1911.

== Head coaching record ==
=== Football ===
Year	Team	Overall	Conference	Standing	Bowl/playoffs
Hillsdale Dales (Michigan Intercollegiate Athletic Association) (1911–1912)
1911	Hillsdale	3–2			
1912	Hillsdale	5–1–1			
Hillsdale:		8–3–1			
Carleton (Independent) (1913–1916)
1913	Carleton	6–0			
1914	Carleton	6–0			
1915	Carleton	6–0			
1916	Carleton	6–0			
Washington (Pacific Coast Conference) (1917)
1917	Washington	1–2–1	0–2–1	5th	
Washington (Pacific Coast Conference) (1919)
1919	Washington	5–1	2–1	T–1st	
Washington:		6–3–1	2–3–1		
Carleton (Minnesota Intercollegiate Athletic Conference) (1920–1921)
1920	Carleton	4–1–2	3–1		
1921	Carleton	6–1	3–1	2nd	
Carleton (Minnesota Intercollegiate Athletic Conference / Midwest Conference) (1922–1924)
1922	Carleton	4–3	2–2 / 1–1	4th / 5th	
1923	Carleton	5–2	3–1 / 2–0	T–2nd / T–1st	
1924	Carleton	5–2	4–0 / 1–2	1st / 6th	
Carleton (Midwest Conference) (1925–1930)
1925	Carleton	6–1	3–0	T–1st	
1926	Carleton	6–1	3–0	1st	
1927	Carleton	6–1	3–1	2nd	
1928	Carleton	2–3–2	2–1–1	T–3rd	
1929	Carleton	2–5	2–2	5th	
1930	Carleton	3–4	1–1	T–5th	
Carleton:		73–24–4			
Total:		87–30–6			
National championship Conference title Conference division title or championship game berth
