= 1917 University Farm football team =

American college football season

1917 University Farm football
- Conference: Independent
- Record: 1–2
- Head coach: Jack Glascock (1st season)
- Captain: George Marshall

1917 Western college football independents records
	Conf.			Overall
Team	W	L	T	W		L		T
Saint Mary's		–		8	–	1	–	1
Hawaii		–		4	–	0	–	1
USC		–		4	–	2	–	1
New Mexico A&M		–		4	–	2	–	0
Arizona		–		3	–	2	–	0
New Mexico		–		1	–	2	–	0
University Farm		–		1	–	2	–	0
Nevada		–		1	–	3	–	0
Montana		–		1	–	4	–	0

The 1917 University Farm football team represented the University Farm—now known as the University of California, Davis—as an independent during the 1917 college football season. Although "University Farm" was the formal name for the school and team, in many newspaper articles from the time it was called "Davis Farm". The team had no nickname in 1917, with the "Aggie" term being introduced in 1922. The football season was shortened in 1917 due to the onset of World War I. The school did not field a team in 1918.

The 1917 team was led by Jack Glascock in his only season as head coach for the school. They played home games in Davis, California. According to the UC Davis media guide, University Farm finished with a 1–2 and was outscored by their opponents 68 to 34 for the season. However, the Nevada Wolf Pack football media guide does not show a game between the two teams in 1917, although one was scheduled to be played on October 1.

== Schedule ==
Date	Opponent	Site	Result	Source
October 1?	Nevada		W 27–7	
October 20	St. Ignatius (CA)	Davis, CA	L 7–13	
?	Preston Industrial School (Note: The Preston School of Industry opened in 1894 to rehabilitate juvenile offenders. It remained open until 2011.)		L 0–48	
