= 1917 California Golden Bears football team =

American college football season

1917 California Golden Bears football
- Conference: Pacific Coast Conference
- Record: 5–5–1 (2–1 PCC)
- Head coach: Andy Smith (2nd season)
- Offensive scheme: Short-punt
- Captain: Fred T. Brooks & Daniel P. Foster
- Home stadium: California Field

1917 Pacific Coast Conference football standings
	Conf.					Overall
Team	W		L		T	W		L		T
Washington State $	3	–	0	–	0	6	–	0	–	1
California	2	–	1	–	0	5	–	5	–	1
Oregon Agricultural	1	–	2	–	1	4	–	2	–	1
Oregon	1	–	2	–	0	3	–	3	–	0
Washington	0	–	2	–	1	1	–	2	–	1
$ – Conference champion

The 1917 California Golden Bears football team was an American football team that represented the University of California, Berkeley in the Pacific Coast Conference (PCC) during the 1917 college football season. In their second year under head coach Andy Smith, the team compiled a 5–5–1 record (2–1 against PCC opponents), finished in second place in the PCC, and outscored its opponents by a combined total of 149 to 104.

== Schedule ==
Date	Opponent	Site	Result	Attendance	Source
September 15	Mare Island*	California Field; Berkeley, CA	L 0–27		
September 22	Olympic Club*	California Field; Berkeley, CA	L 2–6		
September 29	Mare Island*	California Field; Berkeley, CA	L 0–26		
October 6	Olympic Club*	California Field; Berkeley, CA	W 40–0		
October 13	Navy Hospital Corps*	California Field; Berkeley, CA	W 32–7		
October 20	Occidental*	California Field; Berkeley, CA	W 20–0		
October 27	Oregon Agricultural	California Field; Berkeley, CA	W 14–3		
November 3	Washington	California Field; Berkeley, CA	W 27–0	1,000	
November 10	Saint Mary's*	California Field; Berkeley, CA	L 13–14		
November 17	at Oregon	Kincaid Field; Eugene, OR	L 0–21		
November 29	at USC*	Bovard Field; Los Angeles, CA	T 0–0	10,000	
*Non-conference game
