= 1912 Oregon Webfoots football team =

American college football season

1912 Oregon Webfoots football
- Conference: Northwest Conference
- Record: 3–4 (2–3 Northwest)
- Head coach: Louis Pinkham (1st season)
- Captain: Dean Walker
- Home stadium: Kincaid Field

1912 Northwest Conference football standings
	Conf.					Overall
Team	W		L		T	W		L		T
Washington $	4	–	0	–	0	6	–	0	–	0
Idaho	2	–	2	–	0	2	–	2	–	0
Whitman	2	–	2	–	0	2	–	2	–	0
Oregon	2	–	3	–	0	3	–	4	–	0
Washington State	2	–	3	–	0	2	–	3	–	0
Oregon Agricultural	1	–	3	–	0	3	–	4	–	0
$ – Conference champion

The 1912 Oregon Webfoots football team represented the University of Oregon as a member of the Northwest Conference during the 1912 college football season. Led by Louis Pinkham, in his first and only season as head coach, the Webfoord compiled an overall record of 3–4 with a mark of 2–3 in conference play, tying for fourth place in the Northwest Conference. The team played home games at Kincaid Field in Eugene, Oregon.

== Schedule ==
Date	Opponent	Site	Result	Attendance	Source
October 12	Willamette*	Kincaid Field; Eugene, OR	W 12–0		
October 19	at Whitman	Walla Walla, WA	L 0–20		
October 26	Washington State	Kincaid Field; Eugene, OR	L 0–7		
November 2	at Idaho	Moscow, ID	W 3–0		
November 16	at Washington	Denny Field; Seattle, WA (rivalry)	L 14–30	5,000	
November 23	vs. Oregon Agricultural	Albany, OR (rivalry)	W 3–0		
November 28	at Multnomah Athletic Club*	Multnomah Field; Portland, OR	L 7–20		
*Non-conference game; Source:
