= 1917 Montana Grizzlies football team =

American college football season

1917 Montana Grizzlies football
- Conference: Independent
- Record: 1–4
- Head coach: Jerry Nissen (3rd season)
- Home stadium: Dornblaser Field

1917 Western college football independents records
	Conf.			Overall
Team	W	L	T	W		L		T
Saint Mary's		–		8	–	1	–	1
Hawaii		–		4	–	0	–	1
USC		–		4	–	2	–	1
New Mexico A&M		–		4	–	2	–	0
Arizona		–		3	–	2	–	0
New Mexico		–		1	–	2	–	0
University Farm		–		1	–	2	–	0
Nevada		–		1	–	3	–	0
Montana		–		1	–	4	–	0

The 1917 Montana Grizzlies football team represented the University of Montana in the 1917 college football season. They were led by third-year head coach Jerry Nissen, played their home games at Dornblaser Field, and finished the season with a record of one win and four losses (1–4).

== Schedule ==
Date	Opponent	Site	Result	Source
October 13	Utah Agricultural	Dornblaser Field; Missoula, MT	L 6–21	
November 3	at Whitman	Walla Walla, WA	L 3–14	
November 10	Montana State	Dornblaser Field; Missoula, MT (rivalry)	W 9–7	
November 17	vs. Washington State	Recreation Park; Spokane, WA	L 0–28	
November 29	Idaho	Dornblaser Field; Missoula, MT (rivalry)	L 3–14	
