= 1912 Washington football team =

American college football season

1912 Washington football

Northwest Conference champion
- Conference: Northwest Conference
- Record: 6–0 (4–0 Northwest)
- Head coach: Gil Dobie (5th season)
- Captain: Tom Griffiths
- Home stadium: Denny Field

1912 Northwest Conference football standings
	Conf.					Overall
Team	W		L		T	W		L		T
Washington $	4	–	0	–	0	6	–	0	–	0
Idaho	2	–	2	–	0	2	–	2	–	0
Whitman	2	–	2	–	0	2	–	2	–	0
Oregon	2	–	3	–	0	3	–	4	–	0
Washington State	2	–	3	–	0	2	–	3	–	0
Oregon Agricultural	1	–	3	–	0	3	–	4	–	0
$ – Conference champion

The 1912 Washington football team was an American football team that represented the University of Washington as a member of the Northwest Conference during the 1912 college football season. In its fifth season under coach Gil Dobie, the team compiled an overall record of 6–0 with a mark of 4–0 in conference play, winning the Northwest Conference title. Washington shut out five of seven opponents, and outscored all opponents by a combined total of 190 to 17. Tom Griffiths was the team captain.

== Schedule ==
Date	Opponent	Site	Result	Attendance	Source
October 12	Puget Sound*	Denny Field; Seattle, WA	W 53–0	2,500	
October 19	Bremerton Sailors*	Denny Field; Seattle, WA	W 55–0	2,000	
October 26	Idaho	Denny Field; Seattle, WA	W 24–0	3,000	
November 9	vs. Oregon Agricultural	Multnomah Field; Portland, OR	W 9–3	3,000	
November 16	Oregon	Denny Field; Seattle, WA (rivalry)	W 30–14	5,000	
November 28	Washington State	Denny Field; Seattle, WA (rivalry)	W 19–0	7,000	
*Non-conference game; Source:
