= 1912 Idaho football team =

American college football season

1912 Idaho football
- Conference: Northwest Conference
- Record: 2–2 (2–2 Northwest)
- Head coach: John G. Griffith (8th season)

1912 Northwest Conference football standings
	Conf.					Overall
Team	W		L		T	W		L		T
Washington $	4	–	0	–	0	6	–	0	–	0
Idaho	2	–	2	–	0	2	–	2	–	0
Whitman	2	–	2	–	0	2	–	2	–	0
Oregon	2	–	3	–	0	3	–	4	–	0
Washington State	2	–	3	–	0	2	–	3	–	0
Oregon Agricultural	1	–	3	–	0	3	–	4	–	0
$ – Conference champion

The 1912 Idaho football team represented the University of Idaho as a member of the Northwest Conference during the 1912 college football season. Led by eighth-year head coach John G. Griffith, Idaho compiled an overall record of 2–2 with all games played against conference opponents, tying for second place in the Northwest Conference.

In the season opener in neighboring Pullman, Idaho posted the first of two straight wins over Washington State in the Battle of the Palouse, 13–0. Rival Montana was not played this season.

== Schedule ==
Date	Opponent	Site	Result	Source
October 18	at Washington State	Rogers Field; Pullman, WA (rivalry)	W 13–0	
October 26	at Washington	Denny Field; Seattle, WA	L 0–24	
November 2	Oregon	Moscow, ID	L 0–3	
November 28	at Whitman	Ankeny Field; Walla Walla, WA	W 13–6	
