= 1917 Hawaii Deans football team =

American college football season

1917 Hawaii Deans football
- Conference: Independent
- Record: 4–0-–1
- Head coach: David L. Crawford (1st season)
- Captain: Lionel Brash

1917 Western college football independents records
	Conf.			Overall
Team	W	L	T	W		L		T
Saint Mary's		–		8	–	1	–	1
Hawaii		–		4	–	0	–	1
USC		–		4	–	2	–	1
New Mexico A&M		–		4	–	2	–	0
Arizona		–		3	–	2	–	0
New Mexico		–		1	–	2	–	0
University Farm		–		1	–	2	–	0
Nevada		–		1	–	3	–	0
Montana		–		1	–	4	–	0

The 1917 Hawaii Deans football team represented the College of Hawaiʻi—now known as the University of Hawaiʻi at Mānoa—as an independent during the 1917 college football season. In their first season under head coach David L. Crawford, the Deans compiled a 4–0–1 record. Lionel Brash was the team captain. The first fatality in Hawaii football history occurred on November 4 when Mariuchi Kuwamoto of the Deans, who was 28 years old, died from a body collision in a game against Kamehameha High School that caused a concussion of the brain.

== Schedule ==
Date	Time	Opponent	Site	Result	Source
October 6		at Punahou School	Alexander Field; Honolulu, Territory of Hawaii	T 0–0	
October 13		at Kamehameha High School	Kamehameha Field; Honolulu, Territory of Hawaii	W 7–6	
October 20		McKinley High School	Cooke Field; Honolulu, Territory of Hawaii	W 48–0	
October 27	3:30 p.m.	at Punahou School	Alexander Field; Honolulu, Territory of Hawaii	W 21–0	
November 3	3:30 p.m.	at Kamehameha High School	Kamehameha Field; Honolulu, Territory of Hawaii	W 12–0	
