= 1912 Oregon Agricultural Aggies football team =

American college football season

1912 Oregon Agricultural Aggies football
- Head coach Sam Dolan
- Conference: Northwest Conference
- Record: 3–4 (1–3 Northwest)
- Head coach: Sam Dolan (2nd season)
- Captain: Otto Sitton
- Home stadium: Bell Field

1912 Northwest Conference football standings
	Conf.					Overall
Team	W		L		T	W		L		T
Washington $	4	–	0	–	0	6	–	0	–	0
Idaho	2	–	2	–	0	2	–	2	–	0
Whitman	2	–	2	–	0	2	–	2	–	0
Oregon	2	–	3	–	0	3	–	4	–	0
Washington State	2	–	3	–	0	2	–	3	–	0
Oregon Agricultural	1	–	3	–	0	3	–	4	–	0
$ – Conference champion

The 1912 Oregon Agricultural Aggies football team represented Oregon Agricultural College (OAC)—now known as Oregon State University—as a member of the Northwest Conference during the 1912 college football season. In their second and final season under head coach Sam Dolan, the Aggies compiled an overall record of 3–4 record with a mark of 1–3 against conference opponents, placing last out of six teams in the Northwest Conference, and outscored their opponents by a combined total of 57 to 40. Otto Sitton was the team captain.

== Schedule ==
Date	Opponent	Site	Result	Attendance	Source
October 12	O.A.C. alumni*	Bell Field; Corvallis, OR	W 2–0		
October 19	at Multnomah Athletic Club*	Multnomah Field; Portland, OR	L 0–9		
November 1	at Washington State	Rogers Field; Pullman, WA	L 9–10		
November 9	vs. Washington	Multnomah Field; Portland, OR	L 3–9	4,000	
November 16	Whitman	Bell Field; Covallis, OR	W 20–3	2,500	
November 23	vs. Oregon	Albany, OR (rivalry)	L 0–3	7,000	
November 28	at Occidental*	Baer Field; Los Angeles, CA	W 23–6		
*Non-conference game

== Game recaps ==
=== October 19: at Multnomah Athletic Club ===
The Oregon Agricultural College Aggies opened their 1912 season with a pair of non-conference tune-up games, a 2-0 tussle against a team of former OAC players, followed by a more serious game against the Multnomah Amateur Athletic Club in Portland on October 19.

The Multnomah game was played in Portland on a field covered with two inches of mud, causing the gridiron to resemble "a large swamp." The MAC's players were larger and better conditioned, according to the reporter of the Aggies' campus newspaper, but they were able to hold their own defensively throughout the first half of the game.

The contest was still scoreless into the third quarter before Kellogg of OAC committed a 15-yard penalty on a passing play, bringing the ball on the Aggie's 30 yard line. Multnomah elected to free kick for points and converted from the spot for a 3–0 lead. Wolff added a fourth quarter touchdown for the home team on a one-yard run, sealing the victory for the Portland club, 9–0.

=== November 1: at Washington State ===
OAC opened the 1912 Northwest Conference season on November 1 with a 10–9 loss against Washington State College. In what was later proclaimed as "if not the best, one of the best games ever seen on Rogers Field," the Cougars battled back from a 9–7 deficit in the fourth quarter for the win, with a drive culminating in a 27-yard field goal providing the final margin of victory. The comeback thrilled Washington State fans, with the local newspaper remarking that "a new precedent has been established, for it is not within the memory of the oldest living alumnus that a WSC football team has come from behind and won a game after their opponents had taken a lead."

=== November 9: vs. University of Washington ===
On November 9 OAC went up against the University of Washington at Multnomah Field in Portland. Coming off a 34-point crushing in 1911, the Huskies were decided favorites in the contest, with one Corvallis newspaper acknowledging "OAC most emphatically has a chance – a bare, fighting chance, perhaps, but while there is life there is hope, and there is plenty of life around these parts." Fan travel from Corvallis to Portland was coordinated, with an estimated 400 to 600 OAC fans anticipated to take advantage of a special $2.60 group travel rate to see the game in the city. In front of 4,000 cheering spectators, Washington made use of superior depth to emerge with a 9–3 win, with Huskies head coach Gil Dobie using 18 players in the victory. With the score tied 3 to 3, the Washington coach inserted five fresh reserves in the fourth quarter; one of these picked off a pass by Dewey of the Aggies in the final four minutes of the game, a critical turnover which led to the winning score for Washington.

=== November 16: Whitman College ===
The third conference game of the season for the OAC Aggies brought the football team of Whitman College of Walla Walla, Washington to Corvallis. The Whitman Missionaries should not be regarded as a "patsy" opponent, having already shellacked a common opponent, the Washington State Cougars, by a score of 30–0, while having crushed the Oregon Webfoots by as nearly as impressive a margin, 20–0. Indeed, coming into the game Whitman was regarded as the odds-on favorite.

OAC fans showed spirit with a "serpentine" line during halftime of the Nov. 23, 1912 game against the arch rival University of Oregon, held at a neutral field in Albany.

Playing on a muddy field, the Aggies turned in their best performance of the year, topping Whitman by a score of 20–3. Dewey, Shaw, and Larson scored touchdowns for the Aggies in the win, with Niles adding a garbage time field goal for head coach Archie Hahn and his Whitman squad in the closing minutes of the fourth quarter to avoid the shutout.

=== November 23: vs. University of Oregon ===
The 1–2 Aggies next headed for a neutral field in neighboring Albany, Oregon, for their November 23 matchup against their arch in-state rivals, the University of Oregon Webfoots in the fifteenth installment of what would later come to be known as the Civil War. Although the final score was close, the game was dominated by the Eugene squad, with Oregon's Johnny Parsons breaking off three long runs against the Aggies, finishing the day with over 200 total yards gained. Penalties and multiple missed kicks proved the bane for the Oregon team, with a number of long punts by OAC substitute Larson responsible for keeping Oregon out of the end zone. A 22-yard kick by Fenton for the Webfoots in the second quarter proved to be the game's only scoring in Oregon's 3–0 victory.

=== November 28: at Occidental College ===
With the conference schedule finished, the Beavers traveled south to play Occidental College of Los Angeles in their final game of the year, scheduled for Thanksgiving Day, Thursday, November 28. The contract provided for a traveling squad of seventeen – eleven starters and six reserves – together with head coach Dolan. The Aggies were short two of their starters, with star left halfback Blackwell out with a badly sprained ankle and fullback Jim Evendon gone with a knee injury. Adding to the OAC injury woes were dings to left end Bennie Robertson (back) and right halfback Shaw (nose). Despite the physical shortcomings, the team managed to end the year on a promising note, delivering a punishing 23–6 win to Oxy. In the game Occidental took a 6–0 lead in the second quarter with a 70-yard run from scrimmage, but OAC quickly answered with a Shaw touchdown and a conversion to take a 7–6 lead. In the second half a fumble was recovered by Reynolds and returned all the way to the Occidental one-yard line, but OAC was unable to push the ball in and was forced to settle for three points. Two additional touchdowns, the first on a run by Robertson, concluded the scoring.

OAC ended the year with 3 wins and 4 losses, although putting up just the Whitman win against three losses in conference play. For the year, powered by its two big wins, the Beavers outscored their opponents 57 to 40.

== Roster ==
1912 OAC Aggies team photo.

• Left end: Bennie Robertson
• Left tackle: Frank "Prunes" Moore
• Left guard: "Gloomy Gus" Hofer
• Center: Bob Chrisman †
• Right guard: Otto Sitton (captain)
• Right tackle: Everett May
• Right end: Don Kellogg

• Quarterback: George "Admiral" Dewey
• Left Halfback: Ira "Fatty" Blackwell †
• Right Halfback: James N. "Hunky" Shaw
• Fullback: Jim Evendon

†- 1912 All-Northwest First Team pick of Roscoe Fawcett (Oregonian)
Average weight: Linemen: 174 pounds; Backfield 162 pounds.

Substitute linemen: Hoffman, L.L. Laythe
Backfield substitutes: Charles "Shrimp" Reynolds (QB), "Rasty" Rasmussen (FB), "Toots" Richardson (HB)
Utility substitutes: A.L. Larson, Harry N. Hewitt, Anderson, Leroy McKenzie
Injured in Multnomah game and lost for year: "Amy" Hauser

Note: players played both offense and defense in this era, as in modern rugby or soccer.
