= 1917 New Mexico A&M Aggies football team =

American college football season

1917 New Mexico A&M Aggies football
- Conference: Independent
- Record: 4–2
- Head coach: John G. Griffith (1st season)
- Home stadium: Miller Field

1917 Western college football independents records
| | Conf. | | | Overall |
| Team | W | L | T | W | | L | | T |
|---|---|---|---|---|---|---|---|---|
| Saint Mary's | | – | | 8 | – | 1 | – | 1 |
| Hawaii | | – | | 4 | – | 0 | – | 1 |
| USC | | – | | 4 | – | 2 | – | 1 |
| New Mexico A&M | | – | | 4 | – | 2 | – | 0 |
| Arizona | | – | | 3 | – | 2 | – | 0 |
| New Mexico | | – | | 1 | – | 2 | – | 0 |
| University Farm | | – | | 1 | – | 2 | – | 0 |
| Nevada | | – | | 1 | – | 3 | – | 0 |
| Montana | | – | | 1 | – | 4 | – | 0 |

The 1917 New Mexico A&M Aggies football team was an American football team that represented New Mexico College of Agriculture and Mechanical Arts (now known as New Mexico State University) during the 1917 college football season. In their first and only year under head coach John G. Griffith, the Aggies compiled a 4–2 record and outscored all opponents by a total of 231 to 75.

The team's scoring average of 38.5 points per game remains a school record. In the annual rivalry game with New Mexico, the Aggies scored 110 points, which remains the school's single-game scoring record. Robert Foster scored seven touchdowns and 42 points in the game which also remain school records.

== Schedule ==
| Date | Time | Opponent | Site | Result | Source |
|---|---|---|---|---|---|
| | | 7th Cavalry, Fort Bliss | Miller Field; Las Cruces, NM | W 3–0 | |
| October 20 | | El Paso High School | Miller Field; Las Cruces, NM | W 21–0 | |
| October 27 | | 7th Cavalry (Troop L) | Miller Field; Las Cruces, NM | W 84–0 | |
| November 3 | 3:00 p.m. | at Arizona | Fair ground gridiron; Tucson, AZ | L 7–26 | |
| November 16 | | at New Mexico Military | Roswell, NM | L 6–46 | |
| November 29 | | New Mexico | Miller Field; Las Cruces, NM (rivalry) | W 110–3 | |
