= 1911 Oregon Agricultural Aggies football team =

American college football season

1911 Oregon Agricultural Aggies football
- Conference: Northwest Conference
- Record: 5–2 (2–1 Northwest)
- Head coach: Sam Dolan (1st season)
- Captain: Everett May
- Home stadium: Bell Field

1911 Northwest Conference football standings
	Conf.					Overall
Team	W		L		T	W		L		T
Washington $	4	–	0	–	0	7	–	0	–	0
Oregon Agricultural	2	–	1	–	0	5	–	2	–	0
Oregon	2	–	1	–	0	3	–	2	–	0
Washington State	2	–	3	–	0	3	–	3	–	0
Idaho	1	–	2	–	0	4	–	3	–	0
Whitman	0	–	4	–	0	1	–	4	–	0
$ – Conference champion

The 1911 Oregon Agricultural Aggies football team represented Oregon Agricultural College (OAC)—now known as Oregon State University—as a member of the Northwest Conference during the 1911 college football season. In their first season under head coach Sam "Rosy " Dolan, the Aggies compiled an overall record of 5–2 with a mark of 2–1 in conference play, tying for second place in the Northwest Conference.

Oregon Agricultural outscored opponents by a total of 119 to 49. Against major opponents, the Aggies lost to Washington (34–0) and defeated Washington State (6–0). The team played home games at Bell Field in Corvallis, Oregon.

Game action from the season opener against Pacific University at Bell Field. OAC are in the vest-like jerseys.

== Schedule ==
Date	Opponent	Site	Result	Attendance	Source
October 7	O.A.C. alumni*	Bell Field; Corvallis, OR	L 2–3		
October 21	Pacific (OR)*	Bell Field; Corvallis, OR	W 26–0		
October 28	Chemawa*	Bell Field; Corvallis, OR	W 75–6		
November 4	at Washington	Denny Field; Seattle, WA	L 0–34		
November 11	Washington State	Bell Field; Corvallis, OR	W 6–0		
November 22	Willamette*	Bell Field; Corvallis, OR	W 5–3		
November 30	at Whitman	Walla Walla, WA	W 5–3		
*Non-conference game
