= Bill Warner (American football) =

American football player and coach (1881–1944)

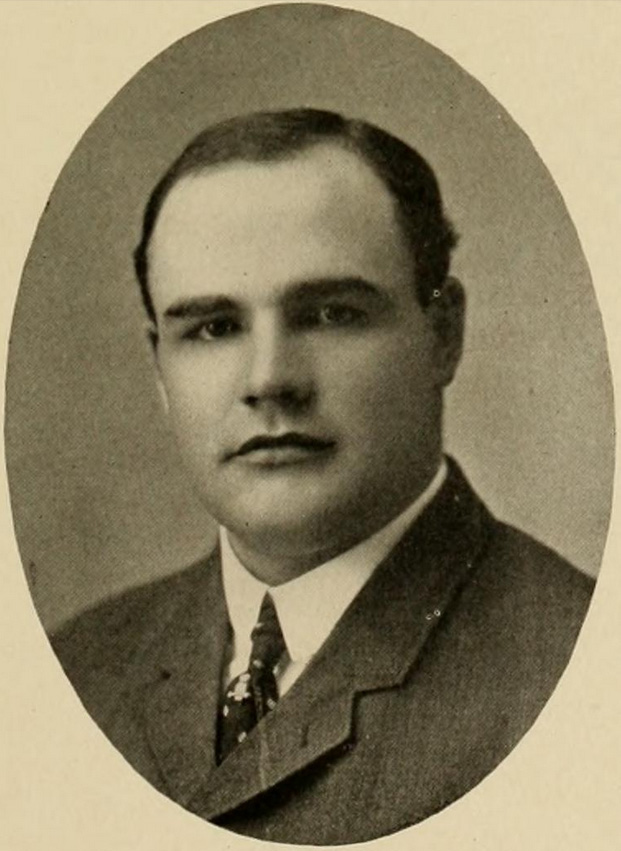
- Warner in 1906

Biographical details
- Born: January 24, 1881; Springville, New York, U.S.
- Died: February 12, 1944 (aged 63); Portland, Oregon, U.S.

Playing career
- 1899–1902: Cornell
- 1902: Syracuse A. A.
- Position: Guard

Coaching career (HC unless noted)
- 1903: Cornell
- 1904: Sherman Institute (CA)
- 1905: North Carolina
- 1906–1907: Colgate
- 1908: Sherman Institute (CA)
- 1909: Saint Louis
- 1910–1911: Oregon

Head coaching record
- Overall: 28–20–5

Accomplishments and honors

Awards
- 2× consensus All-American (1901, 1902)
- College Football Hall of Fame; Inducted in 1971 (profile)

William Jay Warner (January 24, 1881 – February 12, 1944) was an American football player and coach. Warner graduated from Cornell University in 1903 and was a member of the Sphinx Head Society. He was elected to the College Football Hall of Fame in 1971.

Following his playing career at Cornell University, Warner was the head football coach at Cornell University, the University of North Carolina, Colgate University, Saint Louis University, and the University of Oregon. He also coached football at Sherman Institute—now known as Sherman Indian High School—in Riverside, California.

Warner was the brother of famed football coach Pop Warner. In 1902, Bill and Glenn both played pro football for the Syracuse Athletic Club during the first World Series of Football, held at Madison Square Garden. It was during this event, that Warner played in the first professional indoor football game as his Syracuse squad upset the heavily favored "New York" team. While Glenn was injured during the event with a head injury, Bill and the rest of the Syracuse team went on to win the event.

== Head coaching record ==
=== College ===
| Year | Team | Overall | Conference | Standing | Bowl/playoffs |
|---|---|---|---|---|---|
Cornell (Independent) (1903)
| 1903 | Cornell | 6–3–1 | | | |
| Cornell: | | 6–3–1 | | | |
North Carolina Tar Heels (Independent) (1905)
| 1905 | North Carolina | 4–3–1 | | | |
| North Carolina: | | 4–3–1 | | | |
Colgate (Independent) (1906)
| 1906 | Colgate | 4–2–2 | | | |
| 1907 | Colgate | 4–4–1 | | | |
| Colgate: | | 8–6–3 | | | |
Saint Louis Blue and White (Independent) (1909)
| 1909 | Saint Louis | 3–5 | | | |
| Saint Louis: | | 3–5 | | | |
Oregon Webfoots (Northwest Conference) (1910–1911)
| 1910 | Oregon | 4–1 | 2–0 | 2nd | |
| 1911 | Oregon | 3–2 | 2–1 | T–2nd | |
| Oregon: | | 7–3 | 4–1 | | |
| Total: | | 28–20–5 | | | |

== Additional sources ==
- Carroll, Bob (1980). "The First Football World Series" (PDF). Coffin Corner. 2 (Annual). Professional Football Researchers Association: 1–8. Archived from the original (PDF) on December 18, 2010.
- Peterson, Robert W. (1997). Pigskin: The Early Years of Pro Football. Oxford University Press. ISBN 0-19-511913-4.
- McCann, Michael C. (1995). Oregon Ducks Football: 100 Years of Glory. Eugene, OR: McCann Communications Corp. ISBN 0-9648244-7-7.
