= 1914 Idaho football team =

American college football season

1914 Idaho football
- Conference: Northwest Conference
- Record: 2–3–1 (1–3 Northwest)
- Head coach: John G. Griffith (10th season)
- Home stadium: MacLean Field

1914 Northwest Conference football standings
| | Conf. | | | | | Overall |
| Team | W | | L | | T | W | | L | | T |
|---|---|---|---|---|---|---|---|---|---|---|
| Washington $ | 3 | – | 0 | – | 1 | 6 | – | 0 | – | 1 |
| Oregon Agricultural | 2 | – | 0 | – | 2 | 7 | – | 0 | – | 2 |
| Oregon | 3 | – | 1 | – | 1 | 4 | – | 2 | – | 1 |
| Washington State | 2 | – | 3 | – | 0 | 2 | – | 4 | – | 0 |
| Idaho | 1 | – | 3 | – | 0 | 2 | – | 3 | – | 1 |
| Whitman | 0 | – | 4 | – | 0 | 0 | – | 4 | – | 0 |
$ – Conference champion

The 1914 Idaho football team represented the University of Idaho as a member of the Northwest Conference during the 1914 college football season. Led by John G. Griffith in his tenth and final season as head coach, Idaho compiled an overall record of 2–3–1 with a mark of 1–3 in conference play, placing fifth in the Northwest Conference. The first three games of the season were at home in Moscow, with the opener at the fairgrounds, and two on campus at the new MacLean Field.

In the season opener, Idaho defeated Gonzaga, 5−3, and then played a scoreless tie with Montana in the mud in the MacLean Field debut.

After two consecutive wins in the series, Idaho lost to Washington State in the Battle of the Palouse, falling 0–3 at Rogers Field in Pullman. The weather was ideal but the only score was a drop-kick field goal in the second quarter. Nine years later, the Vandals won the first of three consecutive, their only three-peat in the rivalry series.

Idaho tallied a mere twelve points in its six games. In the opener, they scored on a field goal and a safety on a punt return, then went scoreless in the next four games. The sole Idaho touchdown came in the final game on a forward pass for the game's only score.

It was Griffith's final year as head coach; he left for Oklahoma A&M (now Oklahoma State) in Stillwater.

== Schedule ==
| Date | Opponent | Site | Result | Source |
|---|---|---|---|---|
| October 10 | Gonzaga* | Fairgrounds field; Moscow, ID (rivalry) | W 5–3 | |
| October 17 | Montana* | MacLean Field; Moscow, ID (rivalry) | T 0–0 | |
| October 24 | Oregon | MacLean Field; Moscow, ID | L 0–13 | |
| November 7 | at Washington State | Rogers Field; Pullman, WA (rivalry) | L 0–3 | |
| November 14 | vs. Oregon Agricultural | Multnomah Field; Portland, OR | L 0–26 | |
| November 26 | at Whitman | Walla Walla, WA | W 7–0 | |
*Non-conference game
