= 1914 Oregon Agricultural Aggies football team =

American college football season

1914 Oregon Agricultural Aggies football
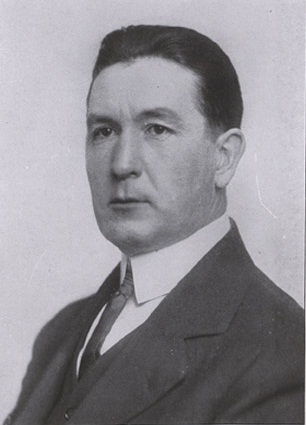
- Conference: Northwest Conference
- Record: 7–0–2 (2–0–2 Northwest)
- Head coach: E. J. Stewart (2nd season)
- Captain: Paul "Gloomy Gus" Hofer
- Home stadium: Bell Field

1914 Northwest Conference football standings
	Conf.					Overall
Team	W		L		T	W		L		T
Washington $	3	–	0	–	1	6	–	0	–	1
Oregon Agricultural	2	–	0	–	2	7	–	0	–	2
Oregon	3	–	1	–	1	4	–	2	–	1
Washington State	2	–	3	–	0	2	–	4	–	0
Idaho	1	–	3	–	0	2	–	3	–	1
Whitman	0	–	4	–	0	0	–	4	–	0
$ – Conference champion

The 1914 Oregon Agricultural Aggies football team represented Oregon Agricultural College (OAC)—now known as Oregon State University—as a member of the Northwest Conference during the 1914 college football season. In their second season under head coach E. J. "Doc" Stewart, the Aggies compiled an overall record of 7–0–2 record with a mark of 2–0–2 in conference play, placing second in the Northwest Conference, and outscored their opponents by a combined total of 172 to 15.

Against major opponents, the Aggies defeated Washington State (7–0), Idaho (26–0), and USC (38–6), and played to a tie against Washington (0–0) and Oregon (3–3). The team played home games at Bell Field in Corvallis, Oregon as well as two games at OAC-friendly neutral fields in Albany and Portland. Right tackle Paul "Gloomy Gus" Hofer was the team captain.

The 1914 team's ostensible record of 7 wins, 0 losses, and 2 ties includes victories in exhibition games against an ad hoc OAC alumni team and the 1914 OAC freshman squad.

== Background ==
=== Training camp ===
Oregon Agricultural College's 1914 football season began with a training camp opening September 6 on the Oregon coast. The team was housed in tents at the Ocean Hill Resort, located about two miles outside Newport and practices were held on the forgiving sands of the beach. Head coach "Doc" Stewart and assistant coach Everett May were joined by more than two dozen prospects, who enjoyed playing in the surf, card-playing, and hiking during free time between Stewart's two-a-day practices. The two week camp focused on basic skills such as blocking, tackling, fumble recovery, and punting, with a heavy dose of running to build physical endurance.

Despite efforts to minimize the impact of training by playing on sand, there were a number of injuries incurred in full-contact drills, including the loss of Steve Schuster to a broken collar bone, a broken nose suffered by Cole, a dislocated shoulder befalling sophomore Art Lutz, and other assorted lesser injuries. The Newport camp broke the morning of Saturday, September 18.

== Schedule ==
Date	Time	Opponent	Site	Result	Attendance	Source
September 26		OAC alumni*	Bell Field; Corvallis, OR	W 12–0 (exhibition)		
October 3		OAC freshmen*	Bell Field; Corvallis, OR	W 12–0 (exhibition)		
October 10	3:00 p.m.	at Multnomah Athletic Club*	Multnomah Field; Portland, OR	W 10–6		
October 17	3:30 p.m.	Willamette*	Bell Field; Corvallis, OR	W 64–0		
October 24		at Washington State	Rogers Field; Pullman, WA	W 7–0		
October 31		vs. Washington	Albany, OR	T 0–0		
November 14		vs. Idaho	Multnomah Field; Portland, OR	W 26–0		
November 21	2:16 p.m.	Oregon	Bell Field; Corvallis, OR (rivalry)	T 3–3	5,000+	
November 26		vs. USC*	Tacoma Stadium; Tacoma, WA	W 38–6	7,000	
*Non-conference game; Source:

== Game summaries ==
=== September 26: vs. OAC Alumni ===
The season opener, an annual tune-up game against OAC's alumni all-stars, provided a promising start for the 1914 Aggie Varsity, when "the old veterans romped forth on the field like a band of colts," only to fall victim to the superior conditioning and teamwork of the newcomers in the second half. After going 0-for-1 through the air in the first half, Varsity quarterback Lutz connected on a perfect 30-yard forward pass to left end Huntley, setting up the Varsity on the 10 yard line. Three power runs followed, with substitute right halfback Newman doing honors for a 6–0 lead, with the conversion kick missing wide of the uprights.

A second touchdown for the Varsity came in the fourth quarter, when the Alumni fumbled the ball on their own 20-yard line. An end run by Lutz made the score 12-0, with the ball placed in the end zone directly behind the goal posts. Despite the favorable position for the point-after, the kick again sailed wide. The Alumni attempted to counter, mounting an effective final drive, but were halted by the referee's blowing of the final whistle.

=== October 3: vs. OAC Freshmen ===
Aggie football schedule-makers attempted to find an intercollegiate opponent for both the OAC varsity and the freshman team for Saturday, October 3, but were entirely unsuccessful. Facing an idle week for both teams, an exhibition game between the two Beaver elevens was organized.

Head coach "Doc" Stewart held out his backfield from starting, minimizing risk of injury and serving to help equalize the teams. Execution by the varsity was consequently sloppy, with play signals confused by the substitute backfield on multiple occasions, but the veteran squad still had little trouble making hay against the newcomers.

The varsity broke ice in the second quarter when a fumbled lateral by the freshmen to the edge was scooped up by Huntley and returned 50 yards to paydirt. The second touchdown came in the third quarter, when a drive was capped with two runs up the middle by Edward Allworth totaling 20 yards.

Both Aggie unites suffered several minor injuries during the game, including a badly bruised shin that ended the day of varsity center "Admiral" Dewey, a sprained back by freshman end Hulbert, and an injured finger suffered by freshman guard Watson. Despite these physical setbacks, Coach Stewart was impressed with the performance, declaring after the game, "The boys are going good — every one of them is full of fight and willing to work, and if I can only get my crippled backfield in shape in time for the Multnomah game this Saturday, I think we can beat the Clubmen or at least give them a good battle."

=== October 10: at Multnomah Athletic Club ===
A squad of 22 made the trip to Portland for the season-opener against the Multnomah Athletic Club. Sophomore left half Art Lutz was the game's star, pinning the Clubmen deep in their end with long punts and connecting with a 35-yard place kick to open the scoring in the first quarter. He was also instrumental in the game's best play in the second quarter, a "triple pass" (double lateral) that went Abraham-to Lutz-to Huntley for a 25 yard touchdown, for a 10–0 score at the intermission following Lutz's successful conversion kick.

The Orangemen were hampered by the erratic play of center Pete Anderson, who snapped the ball over Lutz's head several times for losses — including a tide-turning 30 yard loss that pinned OAC deep in their end and led to a 2-yard Multnomah touchdown by their own left halfback, Francis. Multnomah attempted a punt out for a more favorable angle for the point after touchdown but failed in the effort. Lutz also made a key interception in the last frame, returning the ball to the Multnomah 20-yard line, although the ensuing 18-yard field goal attempt was blocked, and the 10–6 score became final.

=== October 17: vs. Willamette University ===
OAC's first intercollegiate game of 1914 was played at home against Willamette University. The field was waterlogged, the footing was poor, and the teams were greatly mismatched, with the Aggies raining ten touchdowns on the heads of the visitors. The win was a total team effort, with one local newspaper declaring that "it would be a difficult matter to pick any who did not pull off something sensational. The line did not allow WU to make [first down] yardage once, while the backfield tore off runs ranging from 2 to 40 yards."

Art Lutz and Herman "Abe" Abraham crossed the goal line three times each, with the other four scores accounted for by team captain Paul "Gloomy Gus" Hofer, "Hungry" Smyth, DeWitt Yeager, as well as a player apparently wrongly reported as "Markham". At no point in the game did Willamette manage to cross the Beavers' 30-yard line.

The score might have been even more lopsided but for a sequence of penalties called on the Orangemen for holding and illegal use of hands.

=== November 21: vs. University of Oregon ===
For the second consecutive year, the annual game to decide the Oregon's state collegiate football championship ended unsettled, with the orange-and-black and the lemon-yellow battling to a 3–3 tie in front of more than 5,000 fans. The weather was clear and the field was soft but drying out and thoroughly playable.

The game was eagerly anticipated, with the Eugene Guard newspaper contracting with Western Union for a telegraphic wire with operators at each end. In Corvallis a Guard reporter dictated a description of the play to the sender to the receiver stationed in the front window of the newspaper building, there announcing each play to the assembled crowd by megaphone.

The teams were evenly matched and played a defensive battle in the first half, with the best scoring opportunity coming when Aggie sophomore halfback Art Lutz lined up a 20 yard field goal attempt, only to miss the upright by inches. e game remained scoreless through halftime.

At halftime the two enthusiastic student bodies took to the field with competing serpentine dances, first the fans of the University, followed by 600 OAC students behind a huge orange "O".

ThThe deadlock was finally broken when Lutz connected on his second attempt at a field goal, hitting from 26 yards with 6:00 remaining in the third quarter. "The kick was a beautiful one and sailed fair and square between the uprights," an Oregon State campus newspaper observed.

Oregon was unable to make any ground for most of the second half until connection was made on a 60-yard passing play from quarterback Sharpe to left end Wiest — the team's only forward pass of the day. Catching the ball in the clear, Wiest had just one man to beat for a potentially game-winning touchdown. The defender initially failed to bring Wiest down, but managed to recover and run down Wiest, tripping him up with a saving shoestring tackle. The Aggie defense held and a freshman from The Dalles named Huntington was called upon to placekick the 33-yard equalizer.

In the final two minutes OAC recovered a fumble on the Oregon 40 and fought desperately to retake the lead, but were unable to penetrate inside the Webfoots' 25-yard line before time ran out.

OAC was 1-for-5 passing on the day. Oregon was 1-for-1 for 60 yards.

== Roster ==
The undefeated 1914 OAC team claimed co-ownership of the Northwest Conference title with the University of Washington.

The following students were members of the 1914 Aggies team:

=== Linemen ===
- Pete Anderson — 5-10½, 175# — Senior
- George "Admiral" Dewey — 5-7, 145# — Junior
- Paul "Gloomy Gus" Hofer — 5-10½, 185# — Junior (captain)
- Peck Huntley — 5-11, 156# — Sophomore
- Billie King — 5-10½, 170# — Senior
- Leo Laythe — 5-11½, 195# — Junior
- "Prunes" Moore — 6-0, 192# — Senior
- Steve Schuster — 5-10½, 160# — Sophomore
- "Hungry" Smyth — 6-0, 179# — Junior

=== Backs ===
- Herman "Abe" Abraham — 5-11½, 175# — Sophomore
- Edward Allworth — 5-11, 185# — Sophomore
- Brewer Billie — 5-11½, 176# — Junior
- Paul F. Hoerlein — 6-0, 173# — Freshman
- Art Lutz — 5-10, 165# — Sophomore
- DeWitt Yeager — 5-7½, 158# — Sophomore
