= Russell T. Wilson =

Biographical details
- Education: Earlham (1906)

Playing career

Football
- 1902–1905: Earlham

Coaching career (HC unless noted)

Football
- 1912–1916: Whittier
- 1917–1919: Saint Mary's

Basketball
- 1916–1918: Stanford
- 1925–1926: Santa Clara

Baseball
- 1917: Stanford

Russell Terrell Wilson was a mathematics professor and an American football, basketball and baseball coach. He was a 1906 graduate of Earlham College in Richmond, Indiana. He was a mathematics professor at the University of Southern California beginning in 1912.

Wilson served as the head football coach at Whittier College in Whittier, California and Saint Mary's College of California between 1912 and 1919. Beginning in 1916, Wilson also served as a basketball and baseball coach at Stanford University. He would later coach one season for Santa Clara University.
