= Bovard Field =

Stadium in Los Angeles, California

- Interactive map of Bovard Field
- Location: University of Southern California; Los Angeles, California
- Coordinates: 34.0218°N 118.2853°W
- Owner: University of Southern California
- Operator: University of Southern California
- Capacity: 12,000
- Surface: Natural grass

Construction
- Closed: 1973 (baseball); 1923 (football)
- Demolished: 1973, campus expansion

Tenants
- USC Trojans football USC Trojans baseball

Bovard Field (the United States)

Bovard Field was a stadium in Los Angeles, California, on the campus of the University of Southern California. The Trojans football team played here until they moved to Los Angeles Memorial Coliseum in 1923 and it was the home of USC baseball until Dedeaux Field opened in 1974, about 500 yards (460 m) to the northwest. The football stadium and running track held 12,000 people at its peak, and ran southwest to northeast, near and parallel to today's Watt Way. The elevation of the field is approximately 175 feet (53 m) above sea level.

The baseball field was aligned (home to center field) similar to Dedeaux Field, but a few degrees clockwise, nearly true north, but just slightly west. Home plate was located in today's E.F. Hutton Park and left field was bounded by Watt Way. Beyond first base, a large eucalyptus tree came into play; while its trunk was in foul territory, some of its branches crossed into fair territory and guarded the foul line in shallow right field.

== Mickey Mantle ==
In March 1951, a 19-year-old Mickey Mantle of the New York Yankees, about to embark on his rookie season in the majors, went 4-for-5 with a pair of home runs, one from each side of the plate against the Trojans in an exhibition game. The home run as a leftie was a massive shot that went well beyond the right field fence into the football practice field, during spring drills. He also had a triple for a total of seven runs batted in for the game, which the Yanks won 15–1.
