= Natatorium Park =

Former Amusement Park and Stadium in Spokane, Washington, US

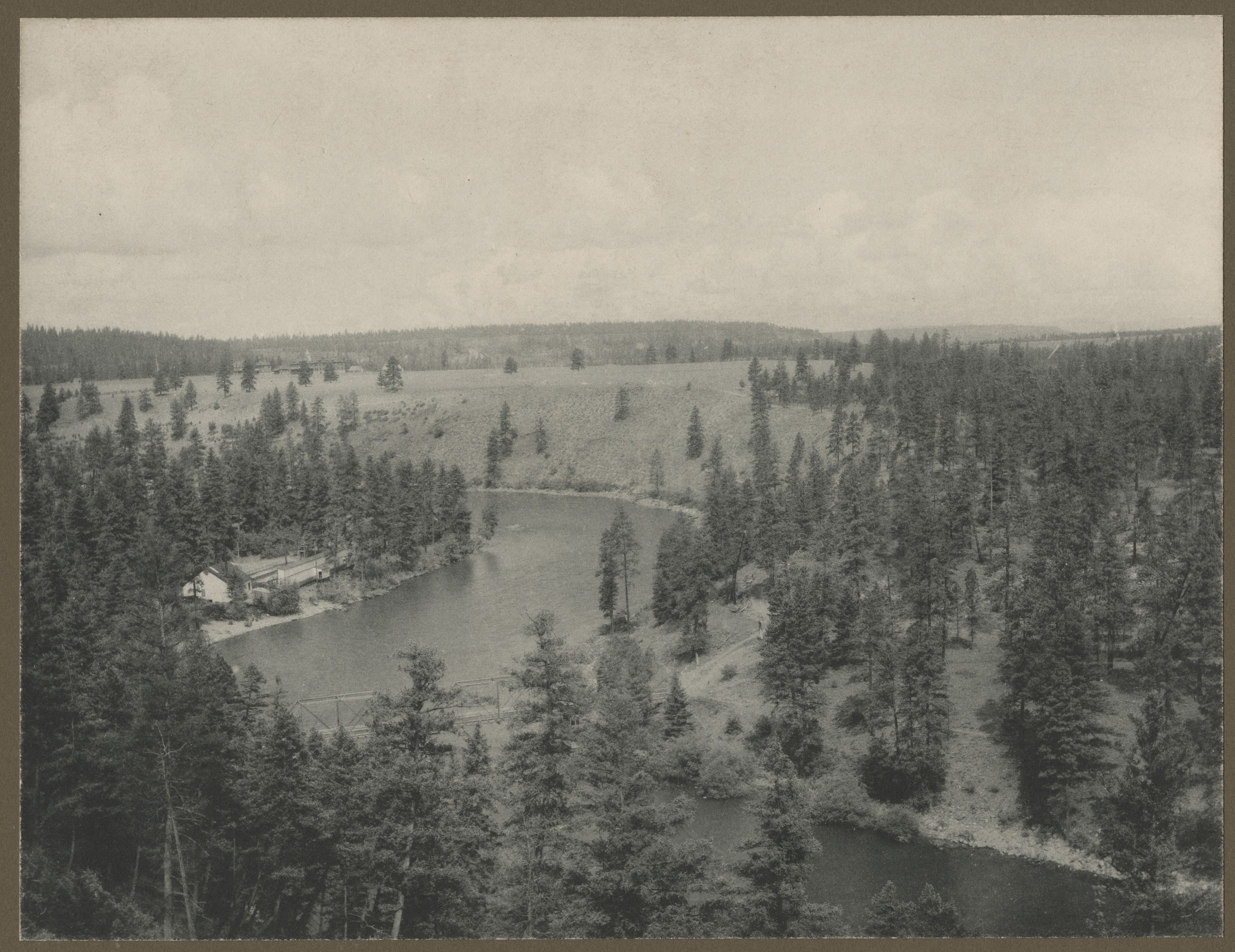
- Natatorium Park c. 1900
- Interactive map of Natatorium Park
- Location: Spokane, Washington, United States
- Coordinates: 47°40′20″N 117°27′30″W
- Closed: 1967

Natatorium Park was a park in Spokane, Washington. It was originally the site of Ingersoll Park where a baseball field was built and became known as Twickenham Park, for the neighborhood that developed around it, until the natatorium was built. The swimming facility closed in 1968.

It used heated freshwater from the Spokane River. A greenhouse and gardens were added. It was switched to well water. The song "Dear Old Nat" by A. D. Scammell was written about it. Amusements were added. The site is now a trailer park.

KSPS aired the documentary Remember When: Nat Park in 1996.
