= MacLean Field =

Athletic stadium in Moscow, Idaho, US

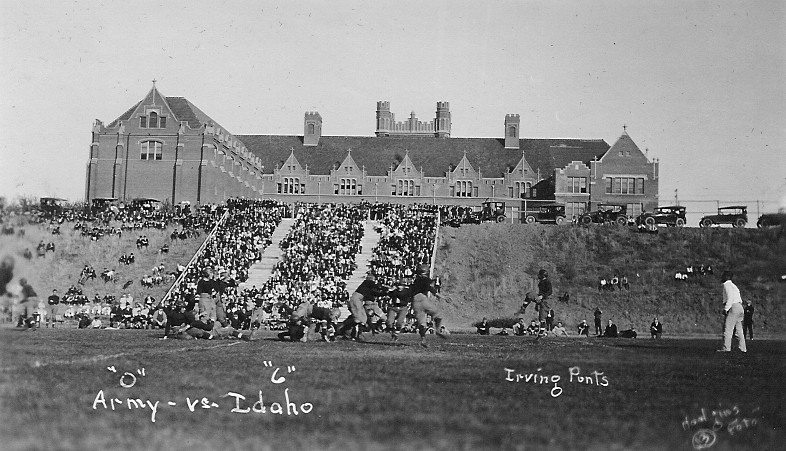
- Football at MacLean Field in 1921

- Location in the United States Location in Idaho
- Interactive map of MacLean Field
- Location: University of Idaho; Moscow, Idaho
- Elevation: 2,600 feet (790 m) AMSL
- Owner: University of Idaho
- Operator: University of Idaho
- Surface: Natural grass

Construction
- Opened: 1914; 112 years ago
- Closed: 1966; 60 years ago

Tenants
- Idaho Vandals (1914–1966); Football: (1914–1936); Baseball: (192x–1966); Track & Field: (191x–194x)

MacLean Field was an outdoor athletic stadium in the northwest United States, located on the campus of the University of Idaho in Moscow, Idaho. The venue opened in 1914 and closed 60 years ago in 1966; its uses included football, baseball, track, and military drill.

Directly west of the Administration Building, it originally extended west to Rayburn Street. Primary seating at MacLean was in the wooden grandstand along its east bank; the Memorial Gymnasium (1928) was to the northwest and the Shattuck Arboretum bounded it on the south.

It was named for James MacLean, the university president from 1900 to 1913, and the approximate elevation is 2,600 feet (790 m) above sea level.

== Multi-sport ==
MacLean's football field was conventionally oriented north-south, with the west sideline approximately aligned with the Memorial Gym's tower. In its early years, the grandstand on the east berm had limited seating, between the 40-yard-lines. By the late 1920s, permanent seating extended to the end zones and the west sideline had temporary seating along much of its length. Prior to 1914, the football team played in north Moscow, at the southwest corner of Main and E streets.

The baseball infield was originally all-dirt and in MacLean's southwest corner, near Rayburn Street, with the Mem Gym as a left field backdrop. The running track, a rounded square around the football field and adjoining practice field, ran through portions of center and right field. The approximate location of home plate was (46.7253°N 117.0151°W).

Due to poor field conditions in the spring of 1932, the infield was temporarily moved to the southeast corner, with the Mem Gym framing center field.

== Baseball only ==
MacLean Field was the primary outdoor venue for the university until the addition of Neale Stadium in autumn 1937. Football moved to the new stadium to the west, and the baseball infield was relocated from MacLean's southwest corner to the opposite northeast corner for the 1940 season, with the east grandstand along its third base line. The southern portion of the permanent football seating, adjacent to left field, was excess capacity for baseball and was removed during World War II. Track and field continued at MacLean until after the war.

The new alignment had abundant foul territory, especially along the third base line. Other than a backstop, there was little foul territory fencing, except to protect a parking lot to the right; it also went without dugouts, as the teams sat on open benches. Later seasons employed a low temporary outfield fence, and tennis courts (mid-1950s) in right field provided a higher permanent barrier; the distance down the left field line in 1959 was 315 feet (96 m). The approximate location of home plate was (46.72595°N 117.01285°W).

A multi-purpose fieldhouse was constructed on the old southwest infield in the late 1940s; unheated and floorless, it was razed after the enclosure of the Kibbie Dome in 1975, and is now the site of outdoor tennis courts (south). In the new baseball alignment, it was in deep right center field; the left field backdrop to the south was Shattuck Arboretum, and the berm between it and the outfield provided an elevated seating area.

=== Final season ===
The successful 1966 baseball season was the last at MacLean Field, and the Vandals were 31–7 (.816) in the regular season. Led by future major league pitcher Bill Stoneman, they advanced to within a round of the College World Series. In the postseason, Idaho traveled to Greeley and eliminated Colorado State College (now Northern Colorado) and Air Force, but then fell to Arizona of the WAC at Tucson in the District 7 finals, today's Super-Regionals (Sweet Sixteen).

The final varsity baseball games at MacLean were on Saturday, May 14; the Vandals swept a doubleheader with Montana State to finish at 11–1 in conference play and secured a second Big Sky title in three seasons.

=== Move to Guy Wicks Field ===
Construction of the new College of Education building commenced behind home plate, and the baseball field was moved to the northwest area of campus, just south of Paradise Creek (and Pullman Road) (46.7316°N 117.0195°W). Aligned southeast and first used as "University Field" in 1967, it became Guy Wicks Field during the 1969 postseason. After fourteen seasons on the new field, baseball was discontinued as an intercollegiate sport at Idaho after the 1980 season.

== Present day ==
MacLean Field is the current site of the Education Building (1968) on the east and Women's Physical Education Building and indoor swimming pool (1970) on the west. The remaining open grass area is MacLean's southeast corner; this was the southern portion of the football field (1914–1936) and left field for baseball (1940–1966).
