= Guy L. Rathbun =

American athletics coach and administrator

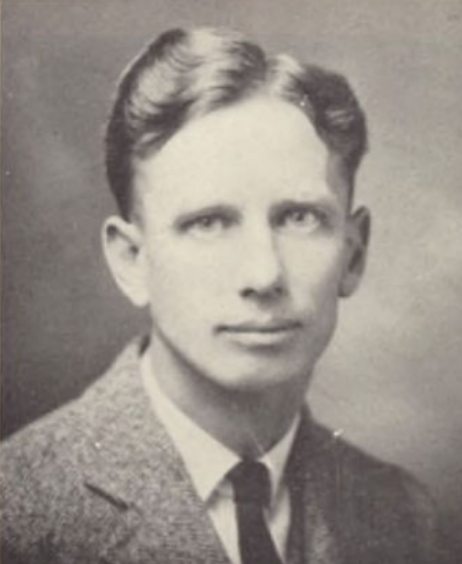
- Rathbun pictured in Wallulah 1925, Willamette University yearbook

Biographical details
- Died: January 22, 1954; Spokane, Washington, U.S.

Coaching career (HC unless noted)

Football
- 1908: Beloit Academy (WI)
- 1910–1916: Beatrice HS (NE)
- 1917–1919: Indiana (assistant)
- 1920–1922: Oregon Agricultural (line)
- 1923–1925: Willamette
- 1927–1928: Sheridan HS (WY)
- 1929–1930: Billings Polytechnic
- 1932–1933: Intermountain Union
- 1934–1936: Spokane Junior College

Basketball
- 1923–1926: Willamette
- 1934–1937: Spokane Junior College

Baseball
- 1918: Indiana
- 1922: Oregon Agricultural

Track and field
- c. 1908: Beloit

Wrestling
- 1918–1919: Indiana
- 1921–1923: Oregon Agricultural

Swimming
- c. 1921–1923: Oregon Agricultural

Administrative career (AD unless noted)
- 1927–1929: Sheridan HS (WY)
- 1929–1931: Billings Polytechnic
- 1932–1934: Intermountain Union
- 1934–1937: Spokane Junior College

Guy L. Rathbun (February 8, 1886 – January 22, 1954) was an American football, basketball, baseball, track and field, swimming, and wrestling coach, and athletics administrator. Rathbun began his career a YMCA physical director in Wisconsin and Nebraska. He held coaching positions at Indiana University (now known as Indiana University Bloomington), Oregon Agricultural College (now known as Oregon State University), Willamette University, Billings Polytechnic Institute, Intermountain Union College, and Spokane Junior College.

== Coaching career ==
A native of Marinette, Wisconsin, Rathbun was physical director and assistant secretary of the YMCA in Lake Geneva, Wisconsin, in 1907, when he was offered a position to take charge of government YMCA work in the Panama Canal Zone. He turned down the offer in Panama and accepted a job as physical director of the YMCA in Beloit, Wisconsin. In 1908, Rathbun coached the football team at Beloit Academy. Around this time, he also coached the track team at Beloit College. In 1909, he moved to Beatrice, Nebraska, to become physical director of the YMCA there. In Beatrice, Rathbun also coached at Beatrice High School, where he mentored Dick Rutherford in football. He left Beatrice in 1917 to become an assistant coach at Indiana University—now known as Indiana University Bloomington—under Ewald O. Stiehm.

At Indiana, Rathbun coached the Indiana Hoosiers baseball team in the spring of 1918, leading the team to an overall record of 9–7 with a mark of 0–5 in conference play, placing eighth in the Big Ten Conference. He left Indiana in 1920, and reunited with Rutherford at Oregon Agricultural College (OAC)—now known as Oregon State University. Rathbun assisted Rutherford in coaching the Oregon Agricultural Aggies football team. He served as line coach for the football team at OAC, and coached swimming, wrestling, and baseball.

In 1923, Rathbun succeeded Roy Bohler as physical director at Willamette University. He led the Willamette Bearcats football team to a record of 5–17–2 in three seasons, from 1923 to 1925. Rathbun resigned from his post at Willamette in 1926. A year later, Rathbun was appointed athletic director at Sheridan High School in Sheridan, Wyoming.

In 1929, Rathbun went to Billings Polytechnic Institute in Billings Montana as director of physical education and athletics. His football teams lost only one game in two seasons. Rathbun resigned from his position at Billings Polytechnic in 1931. The following year, he was hired as athletic director at Intermountain Union College in Helena, Montana. There he also coached the football team. In 1934, Rathbun was appointed director of physical education and athletics at Spokane Valley Junior College—later known as Spokane Junior College—in Spokane, Washington. He coached football and basketball at the school before resigning in 1937.

== Later life and death ==
Rathbun later booked appearances in the Pacific Northwest for the House of David baseball team and the Harlem Globetrotters. He also worked as an agent for the men's employment bureau in Spokane. He died on January 22, 1954, at his home in Spokane.

== Head coaching record ==
=== College football ===
Year	Team	Overall	Conference	Standing	Bowl/playoffs
Willamette Bearcats (Northwest Conference) (1923–1925)
1923	Willamette	2–5–1	0–3	9th	
1924	Willamette	1–5–1	0–3–1	10th	
1925	Willamette	2–7	0–4	10th	
Willamette:		5–17–2	0–10–1		
Billings Polytechnic Crusaders (Independent) (1929–1930)
1929	Billings Polytechnic				
1930	Billings Polytechnic				
Billings Polytechnic:					
Intermountain Union Panthers (Independent) (1932–1933)
1932	Intermountain Union	3–1			
1933	Intermountain Union				
Intermountain Union:					
Total:					
