= John W. Stewart (American football) =

Biographical details
- Born: 1889; New Concord, Ohio, U.S.
- Died: April 23, 1943 (aged 53–54); Missoula, Montana, U.S.
- Education: Geneva (A.B., 1911)

Coaching career (HC unless noted)

Football
- 1918–1919: South Dakota
- 1922–1923: Montana

Basketball
- 1918–1922: South Dakota
- 1922–1932: Montana

Track
- 1923–1925: Montana

Administrative career (AD unless noted)
- 1924–1932: Montana

Head coaching record
- Overall: 10–16 (football); 104–125 (basketball)

John Wilson Stewart (1889 – April 23, 1943) was an American football, basketball, and track coach, college athletics administrator, and educator. He served as the head football coach at the University of South Dakota from 1918 to 1919, and the University of Montana from 1922 to 1923, compiling a career college football coaching record of 10–16. Stewart was the head basketball coach at South Dakota from 1918 to 1922 and Montana from 1922 and 1932, tallying a career college basketball coaching mark of 104–125. He was also the head track coach at Montana from 1923 to 1925 and the school's athletic director from 1924 to 1932.

== Early years ==
Stewart was a 1911 graduate of Geneva College in Beaver Falls, Pennsylvania. He served as a physical education director at several high schools in South Dakota and Iowa spanning 1911 to 1918.

== South Dakota ==
Stewart served as the head football coach (1918–1919) and head men's basketball coach (1918–1922) at the University of South Dakota.

== Montana ==
Stewart served as the head football coach (1922–1923), head men's basketball coach (1922–1932), head track coach (1923–1925), and athletic director at the University of Montana.

== Death ==
Stewart died on April 23, 1943, of a heart attack, in Missoula, Montana.

== Head coaching record ==
=== Football ===
Year	Team	Overall	Conference	Standing	Bowl/playoffs
South Dakota Coyotes (Independent) (1918–1919)
1918	South Dakota	1–2			
1919	South Dakota	2–6			
South Dakota:		3–8			
Montana Grizzlies (Northwest Conference) (1922–1923)
1922	Montana	3–4	0–3	T–7th	
1923	Montana	4–4	1–4	8th	
Montana:		7–8	1–7		
Total:		10–16			
