= Leo J. Frank =

American football player and coach (1895–1961)

Biographical details
- Born: July 17, 1895; Davenport, Iowa, U.S.
- Died: March 25, 1961 (aged 65); Menlo Park, California, U.S.

Playing career
- 1915–1916: Coe
- 1919: Coe
- Position: Halfback

Coaching career (HC unless noted)
- 1920: Sioux Falls
- 1921–1929: Pacific (OR)
- 1932–1937: Parsons
- 1938–1942: Puget Sound

Head coaching record
- Overall: 70–70–13

Accomplishments and honors

Championships
- 1 Iowa Conference (1936)

Leo James Frank (July 17, 1895 – March 25, 1961) was an American college football player and coach. He served as the head football coach at Sioux Falls College—now known as University of Sioux Falls— in 1920, Pacific University in Forest Grove, Oregon from 1921 to 1929, Parsons College from 1932 to 1937, and at Puget Sound University from 1938 to 1942, compiling a career college football coaching record of 70–70–13.

Frank attended Coe College in Cedar Rapids, Iowa, where he played football as a halfback and basketball as a guard.

Frank died on March 25, 1961, at his home in Menlo Park, California.

== Head coaching record ==
Year	Team	Overall	Conference	Standing	Bowl/playoffs
Sioux Falls Braves (South Dakota Intercollegiate Conference) (1920)
1920	Sioux Falls	1–3	1–2	5th	
Sioux Falls:		1–3	1–2		
Pacific Badgers (Independent) (1921–1922)
1921	Pacific	5–1			
1922	Pacific	4–2			
Pacific Badgers (Northwest Conference) (1923–1925)
1923	Pacific	6–3	2–3	6th	
1924	Pacific	3–4	1–3	7th	
1925	Pacific	3–5–1	1–3	T–6th	
Pacific Badgers (Northwest Conference) (1926–1929)
1926	Pacific	2–2–2	2–2–1	3rd	
1927	Pacific	1–5–1	0–4–1	6th	
1928	Pacific	2–6	2–3	T–4th	
1929	Pacific	4–4	2–3	4th	
Pacific:		30–32–4	10–21–2		
Parsons Wildcats (Iowa Conference) (1932–1937)
1932	Parsons	1–4–2	1–3–2	11th	
1933	Parsons	3–2–2	3–2–1	5th	
1934	Parsons	6–2	5–1	3rd	
1935	Parsons	6–2	5–1	4th	
1936	Parsons	6–1–2	6–0	1st	
1937	Parsons	5–3–1	3–2–1	T–5th	
Parsons:		27–14–7	23–9–4		
Puget Sound Loggers (Northwest Conference) (1938–1942)
1938	Puget Sound	2–5	1–3	T–5th	
1939	Puget Sound	1–5–1	1–3	5th	
1940	Puget Sound	3–3–1	2–2–1	4th	
1941	Puget Sound	2–6	2–3	T–3rd	
1942	Puget Sound	4–2	3–1	2nd	
Puget Sound:		12–21–2	9–12–1		
Total:		70–70–13			
National championship Conference title Conference division title or championship game berth
