= Enoch Bagshaw =

American football player and coach

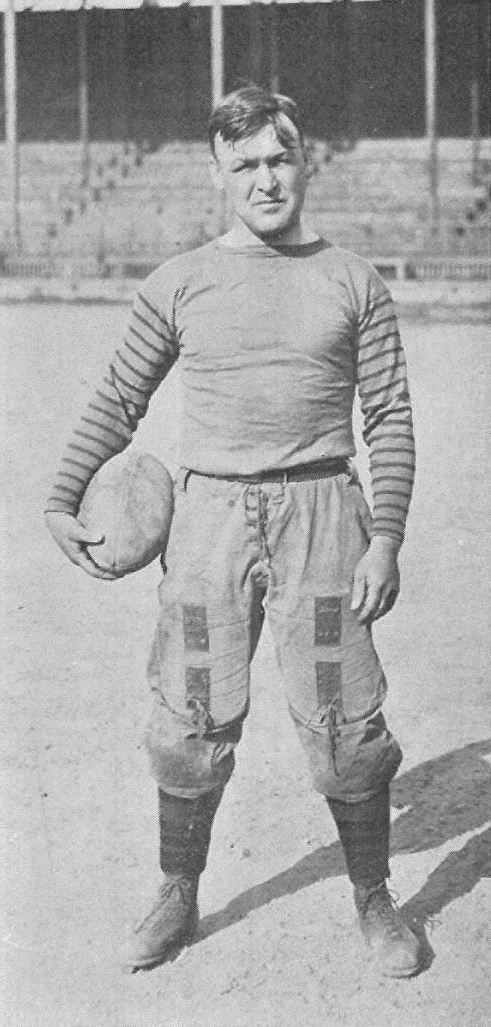
- Bagshaw from the 1922 Tyee

Biographical details
- Born: January 31, 1884; Flint, Flintshire, Wales
- Died: October 3, 1930 (aged 46); Olympia, Washington, U.S.

Playing career
- 1903–1907: Washington
- Positions: End, halfback, quarterback

Coaching career (HC unless noted)
- 1909–1920: Everett HS (WA)
- 1921–1929: Washington

Head coaching record
- Overall: 63–22–6 (college)
- Bowls: 0–1–1

Accomplishments and honors

Championships
- 3 Northwest Conference (1922–1923, 1925); 1 PCC (1925)

Enoch Williams Bagshaw (January 31, 1884 – October 3, 1930) was an American football player and coach. From 1921 to 1929, he served as the head football coach at the University of Washington, compiling a 63–22–6 record. His 1923 and 1926 squads went 10–1–1, equaling the best marks of his career. He was a five-year starter on the football team at Washington.

== Biography ==
Bagshaw was born in Flint, Flintshire, Wales and moved in 1892 with his family to the State of Washington, where he was raised. He served as a first lieutenant with the 43rd Engineer Battalion of the United States Army during World War I.

Bagshaw was appointed supervisor of transportation for Washington state in 1930. He died at the age of 46, on October 3, 1930, after collapsing at the Old Capitol Building in Olympia, Washington.

== Head coaching record ==
Year	Team	Overall	Conference	Standing	Bowl/playoffs
Washington Sun Dodgers (Pacific Coast Conference) (1921)
1921	Washington	3–4–1	0–3–1	6th	
Washington Huskies (Northwest Conference / Pacific Coast Conference) (1922–1925)
1922	Washington	6–1–1	4–0–1 / 4–1–1	T–1st / 3rd	
1923	Washington	10–1–1	6–0 / 4–1	1st / 2nd	T Rose
1924	Washington	8–1–1	5–1 / 3–1–1	3rd / 3rd	
1925	Washington	10–1–1	5–0 / 5–0	T–1st / 1st	L Rose
Washington Huskies (Pacific Coast Conference) (1926–1929)
1926	Washington	8–2	3–2	5th	
1927	Washington	9–2	4–2	4th	
1928	Washington	7–4	2–4	8th	
1929	Washington	2–6–1	0–5–1	10th	
Washington:		63–22–6	33–19–4		
Total:		63–22–6			
National championship Conference title Conference division title or championship game berth
