= John R. Middleton =

American football coach and former quarterback

Playing career
- 1901: Simpson (IA)
- 1903–1905: Idaho
- Position: Quarterback

Coaching career (HC unless noted)
- 1906: Idaho (assistant)
- 1907–1908: Idaho

Head coaching record
- Overall: 5–3–4

John Robert Middleton was an American college football player and coach. He served as the head football coach at his alma mater, the University of Idaho, from 1907 to 1908, compiling a record of 5–3–4. Middleton began his college football playing career as a quarterback at Simpson College in Indianola, Iowa in 1901. He followed his coach at Simpson, John G. Griffith, to the University of Idaho, playing quarterback in the "Idaho Spread", a forerunner to the modern shotgun formation offense, from 1903 to 1905.

== Head coaching record ==
=== Football ===
Year	Team	Overall	Conference	Standing	Bowl/playoffs
Idaho (Independent) (1907)
1907	Idaho	3–1–2			
Idaho (Northwest Conference) (1908)
1908	Idaho	2–2–2	0–2–1	5th	
Idaho:		5–3–4	0–2–1		
Total:		5–3–4			
