= 1908 Idaho football team =

American college football season

1908 Idaho football
- Conference: Northwest Conference
- Record: 2–2–2 (0–2–1 Northwest)
- Head coach: John R. Middleton (2nd season)

1908 Northwest Conference football standings
	Conf.					Overall
Team	W		L		T	W		L		T
Washington $	3	–	0	–	1	6	–	0	–	1
Washington State	1	–	0	–	2	4	–	0	–	2
Oregon	1	–	2	–	0	5	–	2	–	0
Oregon Agricultural	1	–	2	–	0	4	–	3	–	1
Whitman	1	–	3	–	0	4	–	5	–	0
Idaho	0	–	2	–	1	2	–	2	–	2
$ – Conference champion

The 1908 Idaho football team represented the University of Idaho as a member of the Northwest Conference during the 1908 college football season. Led by John R. Middleton in his second and final season as head coach, Idaho compiled an overall record of 2–2–2 with a mark of 0–2–1 in conference play, placing last out of six team in the Northwest Conference.

Idaho met Utah for the first time, in Salt Lake City on Thanksgiving. The field was covered by two feet (60 cm) of snow and the game was scoreless.

== Schedule ==
Date	Opponent	Site	Result	Source
October 10	Spokane YMCA*	Moscow, ID	W 28–0	
October 24	Bremerton Navy*	Moscow, ID	W 32–0	
October 31	Oregon	Moscow, ID	L 21–27	
November 6	at Whitman	Walla Walla, WA	L 0–11	
November 13	at Washington State	Rogers Field; Pullman WA (Battle of the Palouse)	T 4–4	
November 26	at Utah*	Cummings Field; Salt Lake City, UT	T 0–0	
*Non-conference game
