= 1923 Washington State Cougars football team =

American college football season

1923 Washington State Cougars football
- Conference: Northwest Conference, Pacific Coast Conference
- Record: 2–4–1 (2–2–1 Northwest, 1–3–1 PCC)
- Head coach: Albert Exendine (1st season)
- Captain: Vern Hickey
- Home stadium: Rogers Field

Uniform
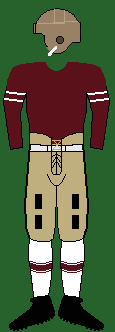

1923 Northwest Conference football standings
	Conf.					Overall
Team	W		L		T	W		L		T
Washington $	6	–	0	–	0	10	–	1	–	1
Idaho	3	–	0	–	1	5	–	2	–	1
Oregon Agricultural	2	–	2	–	1	4	–	5	–	2
Oregon	3	–	3	–	1	3	–	4	–	1
Washington State	2	–	2	–	1	2	–	4	–	1
Pacific (OR)	2	–	3	–	0	5	–	3	–	0
Whitman	1	–	3	–	0	1	–	5	–	0
Montana	1	–	4	–	0	4	–	4	–	0
Willamette	0	–	3	–	0	2	–	5	–	1
$ – Conference champion

1923 Pacific Coast Conference football standings
	Conf.					Overall
Team	W		L		T	W		L		T
California $	5	–	0	–	0	9	–	0	–	1
Washington^	4	–	1	–	0	10	–	1	–	1
Stanford	2	–	2	–	0	7	–	2	–	0
USC	2	–	2	–	0	6	–	2	–	0
Idaho	2	–	2	–	1	5	–	2	–	1
Oregon Agricultural	1	–	3	–	1	4	–	5	–	2
Washington State	1	–	3	–	1	2	–	4	–	1
Oregon	0	–	4	–	1	3	–	4	–	1
$ – Conference champion; ^ Selected as Rose Bowl representative

The 1923 Washington State Cougars football team represented Washington State College—now known as Washington State University—as a member of the Northwest Conference and the Pacific Coast Conference (PCC) during the 1923 college football season. In their first season under head coach Albert Exendine, the Cougars compiled an overall record of 2–4–1 and were outscored by their opponents by a combined total of 84 to 56. Washington State had a record of 2–2–1 in Northwest Conference play, placing in a three-way tie for third, and 1–3–1 against PCC opponents, tying for sixth place. The team's victories were over the Pacific Badgers (19–0) and the Oregon (13–7).

== Schedule ==
Date	Opponent	Site	Result	Attendance	Source
October 6	Pacific (OR)	Rogers Field; Pullman, WA	W 19–0	4,000	
October 13	at Gonzaga*	Gonzaga Stadium; Spokane, WA	L 14–27	8,000	
October 19	Idaho	Rogers Field; Pullman, WA (rivalry)	L 0–14	9,000	
October 27	vs. California	Multnomah Field; Portland, OR	L 0–9	8,000	
November 3	Oregon	Rogers Field; Pullman, WA	W 13–7	6,000	
November 17	vs. Oregon Agricultural	Tacoma Stadium; Tacoma, WA	T 3–3	3,000	
November 24	at Washington	University of Washington Stadium; Seattle, WA (rivalry)	L 7–24	20,000	
*Non-conference game
