= 1923 Stanford football team =

American college football season

1923 Stanford football
- Conference: Pacific Coast Conference
- Record: 7–2 (2–2 PCC)
- Head coach: Andrew Kerr (2nd season)
- Offensive scheme: Double-wing
- Home stadium: Stanford Stadium

1923 Pacific Coast Conference football standings
	Conf.					Overall
Team	W		L		T	W		L		T
California $	5	–	0	–	0	9	–	0	–	1
Washington^	4	–	1	–	0	10	–	1	–	1
Stanford	2	–	2	–	0	7	–	2	–	0
USC	2	–	2	–	0	6	–	2	–	0
Idaho	2	–	2	–	1	5	–	2	–	1
Oregon Agricultural	1	–	3	–	1	4	–	5	–	2
Washington State	1	–	3	–	1	2	–	4	–	1
Oregon	0	–	4	–	1	3	–	4	–	1
$ – Conference champion; ^ Selected as Rose Bowl representative

The 1923 Stanford football team represented Stanford University in the 1923 college football season. Led by Andrew Kerr in his second and final season as head coach, Stanford compiled an overall record of 7–2 with a mark of 2–2 in conference play, placing in a three-way tie for third in the PCC. The Big Game against California was the first game played in California Memorial Stadium.

== Schedule ==
Date	Opponent	Site	Result	Attendance	Source
September 28	Mare Island Marines*	Stanford Stadium; Stanford, CA	W 82–0		
October 6	Nevada*	Stanford Stadium; Stanford, CA	W 27–0		
October 13	Santa Clara*	Stanford Stadium; Stanford, CA	W 55–6		
October 20	Occidental*	Los Angeles Memorial Coliseum; Los Angeles, CA	W 42–0		
October 27	USC	Stanford Stadium; Stanford, CA (rivalry)	L 7–14	20,000	
November 3	Olympic Club*	Stanford Stadium; Stanford, CA	W 40–7		
November 10	at Oregon	Multnomah Field; Portland, OR	W 14–3		
November 17	Idaho	Stanford Stadium; Stanford, CA	W 17–7		
November 24	California	California Memorial Stadium; Berkeley, CA (Big Game)	L 0–9	75,000	
*Non-conference game
