= Dick Rutherford =

American football and basketball coach (1891–1976)

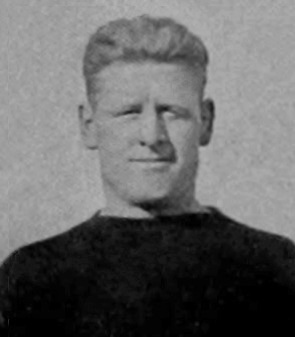
- Rutherford from The Beaver, 1922

Biographical details
- Born: April 11, 1891; Beatrice, Nebraska, U.S.
- Died: February 16, 1976 (aged 84); Paradise, California, U.S.
- Education: University of Nebraska (1916)

Playing career

Football
- 1913–1915: Nebraska

Basketball
- 1913–1916: Nebraska

Wrestling
- 1915–1916: Nebraska
- Position: Halfback (football)

Coaching career (HC unless noted)

Football
- 1917–1919: Washington University
- 1920–1923: Oregon Agricultural

Basketball
- 1917–1920: Washington University
- 1920–1922: Oregon Agricultural

Head coaching record
- Overall: 28–19–6 (football); 58–41 (basketball)

Richard Burr "Red" Rutherford (April 11, 1891 – February 16, 1976) was an American college football and college basketball coach. He served as the head football coach at Washington University in St. Louis from 1917 to 1919 and at Oregon Agricultural College, now Oregon State University, from 1920 to 1923, compiling a career football coaching record of 28–19–6. Rutherford was also the head basketball coach at Washington University from 1917 to 1920 and at Oregon Agricultural from 1920 to 1922, tallying a career basketball coaching mark of 58–41.

== Early years ==
Rutherford was born April 11, 1891, in Beatrice, Nebraska. He attended Beatrice High School in that town.

A stellar athlete, Rutherford was the star fullback for the Beatrice football team. He also made his mark on the hardwood, with the forward sinking a record 14 field goals in a January 1912 basketball game against Marysville, Kansas.

Rutherford attended the University of Nebraska, where he earned a total of 8 athletic letters — 3 in football, 3 in basketball, and 2 in wrestling. Rutherford, a halfback, was touted for the Nebraska head coaching position following the 1915 season, as a potential successor to Jumbo Stiehm, but he ultimately was not offered the job.

Rutherford graduated from Nebraska in 1916 and spent the 1917 season at Nebraska as an assistant coach.

R.G. Clapp, physical director at Nebraska, was effusive about Rutherford's abilities after his departure, calling him "one of the best, if not the best, all-around athlete ever turned out by the University of Nebraska."

== Coaching career ==
=== Washington University (Missouri) ===
Rutherford began his coaching career in earnest in 1917 with the Washington University Pikers of the Missouri Valley Conference. In addition to serving as director of physical education at the school, his teams had three solid seasons on the gridiron, winning the Missouri Valley championship in his second year with a perfect record of 6–0.

Rutherford also coached basketball while at Washington University, with his 1919-20 team finishing as runner-up in the Missouri Valley race.

=== Oregon Agricultural College ===
In April 1920, the 30-year old redhead was named coach of the Oregon Agricultural College (OAC) football team. He would remain there for four seasons, compiling a record of 13–14–6. Rutherford was hired to assume control of all physical education work for men at OAC and to coach not only football but also the basketball team.

Rutherford with the 1921–22 OAC men's basketball team

Rutherford would coach OAC basketball for two seasons, 1920–21 and 1921–22, posting a 27–19 record.

=== Resignation ===
After four seasons at the helm of the OAC football team, during which time he managed no more than two wins and a tie for third place in the Northwest Conference, pressure behind the scenes grew for a change of coaches. On Thursday, January 24, 1924, on the heels of a junket to Hawaii with his team to play two exhibition games, a special meeting of the OAC board of regents was held, at which Rutherford submitted his resignation. The resignation, which was to take effect on July 1, coinciding with the end of his contract, was accepted by the board, which signaled that the search for a replacement was to begin forthwith. According to the Corvallis Gazette-Times, it had been "an open secret" that the alumni had been active in opposing Rutherford's retention.

At the time of his clearly forced resignation, Rutherford expressed appreciation to the student body for their loyalty. "I want it distinctly understood that I am quitting OAC with nothing but the kindest feeling for the institution and the students that have so wholeheartedly given me their loyal support," he said. He remained mum about the situation surrounding his exit, declaring "I have nothing to say with regard to the causes which led to my resignation. Some things will never be known, even after I leave the institution. But I do want to say that, while I may have been disappointed at the turns things have taken at times, I still love old OAC and will cherish the friendships I have formed through the years that come."

== Later life and death ==
After leaving Corvallis, Rutherford moved to Long Beach, California, where he became director of the Pacific Coast Club. After a time, he moved to Fallbrook, California, the self-proclaimed "Avocado Capital of the World," where he became an avocado farmer. Later he returned to coaching at the high school and community college located in nearby Oceanside.

In 1959, Rutherford moved to Stirling City, California and then to Paradise, California in 1969. He died on February 16, 1976, at a hospital in Paradise. His body was interred at Paradise Cemetery.

== Head coaching record ==
=== Football ===
Year	Team	Overall	Conference	Standing
Washington University Pikers (Missouri Valley Conference) (1917–1919)
1917	Washington University	4–3	1–2	6th
1918	Washington University	6–0		
1919	Washington University	5–2	2–2	T–4th
Washington University:		15–5	3–4	
Oregon Agricultural Aggies (Northwest Conference / Pacific Coast Conference) (1920–1923)
1920	Oregon Agricultural	2–2–2	0–1–1 / 1–2–1	5th / 5th
1921	Oregon Agricultural	4–3–2	1–1–1 / 1–2–1	4th / 4th
1922	Oregon Agricultural	3–4	1–2 / 1–3	5th / T–5th
1923	Oregon Agricultural	4–5–2	2–2–1 / 1–3–1	T–3rd / T–6th
Oregon Agricultural:		13–14–6	6–10–3	
Total:		28–19–6		
