= 1908 Oregon Webfoots football team =

American college football season

1908 Oregon Webfoots football
- Conference: Northwest Conference
- Record: 5–2 (1–2 Northwest)
- Head coach: Robert Forbes (1st season)
- Captain: Fred Moullen
- Home stadium: Kincaid Field

1908 Northwest Conference football standings
	Conf.					Overall
Team	W		L		T	W		L		T
Washington $	3	–	0	–	1	6	–	0	–	1
Washington State	1	–	0	–	2	4	–	0	–	2
Oregon	1	–	2	–	0	5	–	2	–	0
Oregon Agricultural	1	–	2	–	0	4	–	3	–	1
Whitman	1	–	3	–	0	4	–	5	–	0
Idaho	0	–	2	–	1	2	–	2	–	2
$ – Conference champion

The 1908 Oregon Webfoots football team represented the University of Oregon as a member of the Northwest Conference during the 1908 college football season. Led by first-year head coach Robert Forbes, the Webfoots compiled an overall record of 5–2 with a mark of 1–2 in conference play, tying for third place in the Northwest Conference.

== Schedule ==
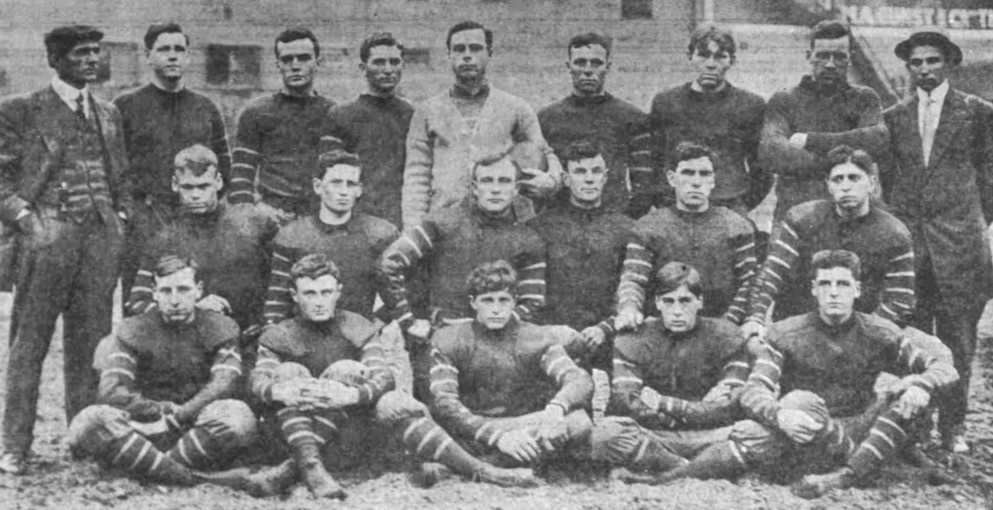
Photo from The Sunday Oregonian

Date	Opponent	Site	Result	Attendance	Source
October 17	Oregon alumni*	Kincaid Field; Eugene, OR	W 4–0		
October 24	Willamette*	Kincaid Field; Eugene, OR	W 15–0		
October 31	at Idaho	Moscow, ID	W 27–21		
November 7	Whitworth*	Kincaid Field; Eugene, OR	L 10–16		
November 14	Washington	Kincaid Field; Eugene, OR (rivalry)	L 0–15	1,000	
November 21	vs. Oregon Agricultural College	Multnomah Field; Portland, OR (rivalry)	W 8–0		
November 26	at Multnomah Athletic Club*	Multnomah Field; Portland, OR	W 10–0		
*Non-conference game; Source:
