= 1923 Washington Huskies football team =

American college football season

1923 Washington Huskies football
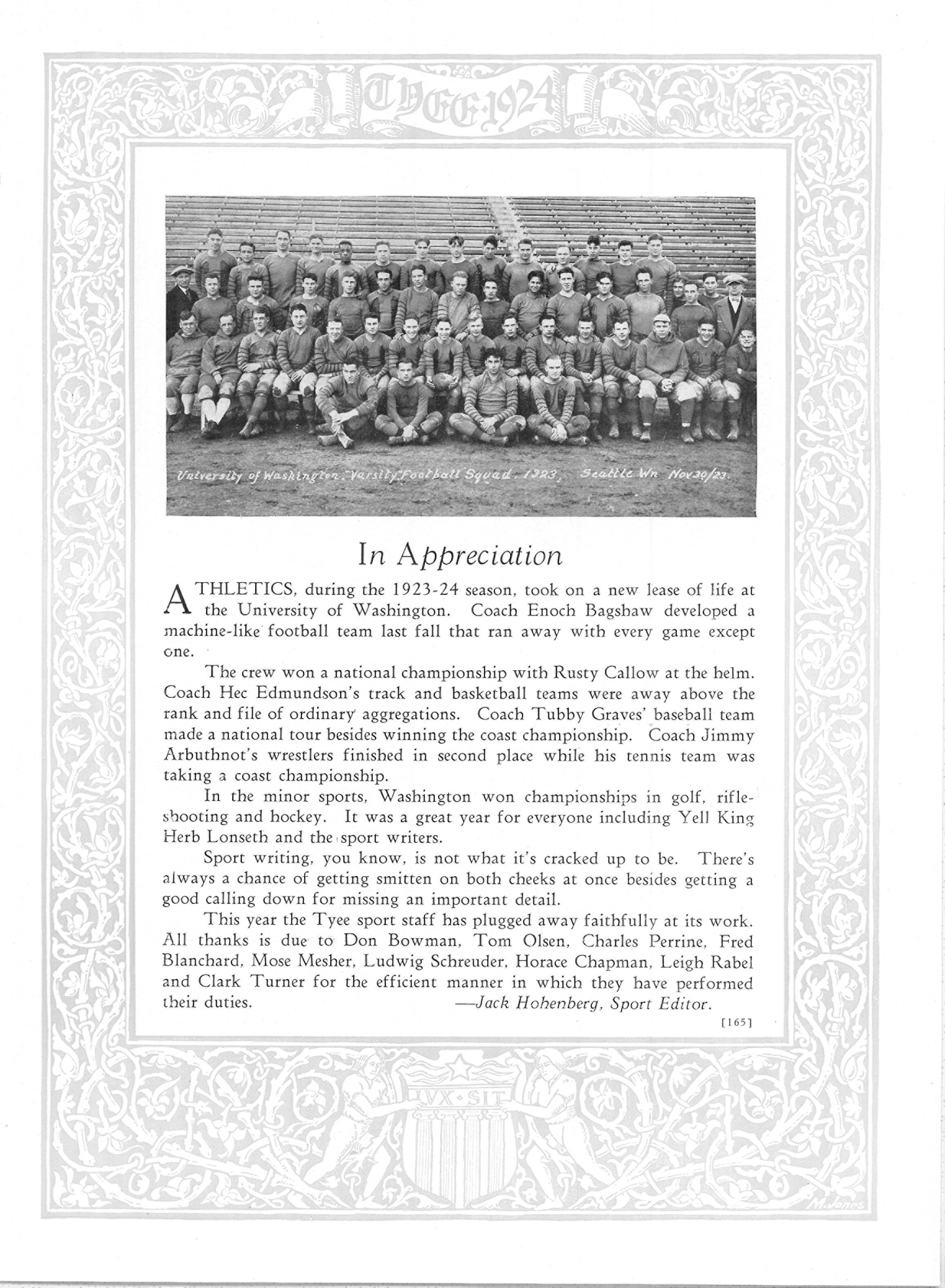

Northwest Conference champion

Rose Bowl, T 14–14 vs. Navy
- Conference: Northwest Conference, Pacific Coast Conference
- Record: 10–1–1 (6–0 Northwest, 4–1 PCC)
- Head coach: Enoch Bagshaw (3rd season)
- Captain: Wayne Hall
- Home stadium: University of Washington Stadium

1923 Northwest Conference football standings
	Conf.					Overall
Team	W		L		T	W		L		T
Washington $	6	–	0	–	0	10	–	1	–	1
Idaho	3	–	0	–	1	5	–	2	–	1
Oregon Agricultural	2	–	2	–	1	4	–	5	–	2
Oregon	3	–	3	–	1	3	–	4	–	1
Washington State	2	–	2	–	1	2	–	4	–	1
Pacific (OR)	2	–	3	–	0	5	–	3	–	0
Whitman	1	–	3	–	0	1	–	5	–	0
Montana	1	–	4	–	0	4	–	4	–	0
Willamette	0	–	3	–	0	2	–	5	–	1
$ – Conference champion

1923 Pacific Coast Conference football standings
	Conf.					Overall
Team	W		L		T	W		L		T
California $	5	–	0	–	0	9	–	0	–	1
Washington^	4	–	1	–	0	10	–	1	–	1
Stanford	2	–	2	–	0	7	–	2	–	0
USC	2	–	2	–	0	6	–	2	–	0
Idaho	2	–	2	–	1	5	–	2	–	1
Oregon Agricultural	1	–	3	–	1	4	–	5	–	2
Washington State	1	–	3	–	1	2	–	4	–	1
Oregon	0	–	4	–	1	3	–	4	–	1
$ – Conference champion; ^ Selected as Rose Bowl representative

The 1923 Washington Huskies football team represented the University of Washington as a member of the Northwest Conference and the Pacific Coast Conference (PCC) during the 1923 college football season. In their third season under head coach Enoch Bagshaw, the Huskies compiled an overall record of 10–1–1 outscored opponents by a combined total of 298 to 58. Washington had a record of 6–0 in Northwest Conference play, winning the conference title, and 4–1 against PCC opponents, finishing second. The Huskies were invited to the Rose Bowl, where they played Navy to a 14–14 tie. Wayne Hall was the team captain.

== Schedule ==
Date	Time	Opponent	Site	Result	Attendance	Source
September 29	1:30 p.m.	USS Mississippi*	University of Washington Stadium; Seattle, WA	W 33–0	6,000	
September 29	3:30 p.m.	USS New York*	University of Washington Stadium; Seattle, WA	W 42–7	6,000	
October 6		Willamette	University of Washington Stadium; Seattle, WA	W 54–0	4,093	
October 13		Whitman	University of Washington Stadium; Seattle, WA	W 19–0	6,162	
October 20		USC	University of Washington Stadium; Seattle, WA	W 22–0	21,500	
October 27		at Puget Sound*	Tacoma Stadium; Tacoma, WA	W 24–0	15,000	
November 3		at Oregon Agricultural	Bell Field; Corvallis, OR	W 14–0	11,000–12,000	
November 10		Montana	University of Washington Stadium; Seattle, WA	W 26–14	15,000	
November 17		at California	California Field; Berkeley, CA	L 0–9	28,000	
November 24		Washington State	University of Washington Stadium; Seattle, WA (rivalry)	W 24–7	20,000	
December 1		Oregon	University of Washington Stadium; Seattle, WA (rivalry)	W 26–7	12,000	
January 1, 1924		vs. Navy*	Rose Bowl; Pasadena, CA (Rose Bowl)	T 14–14	45,000	
*Non-conference game

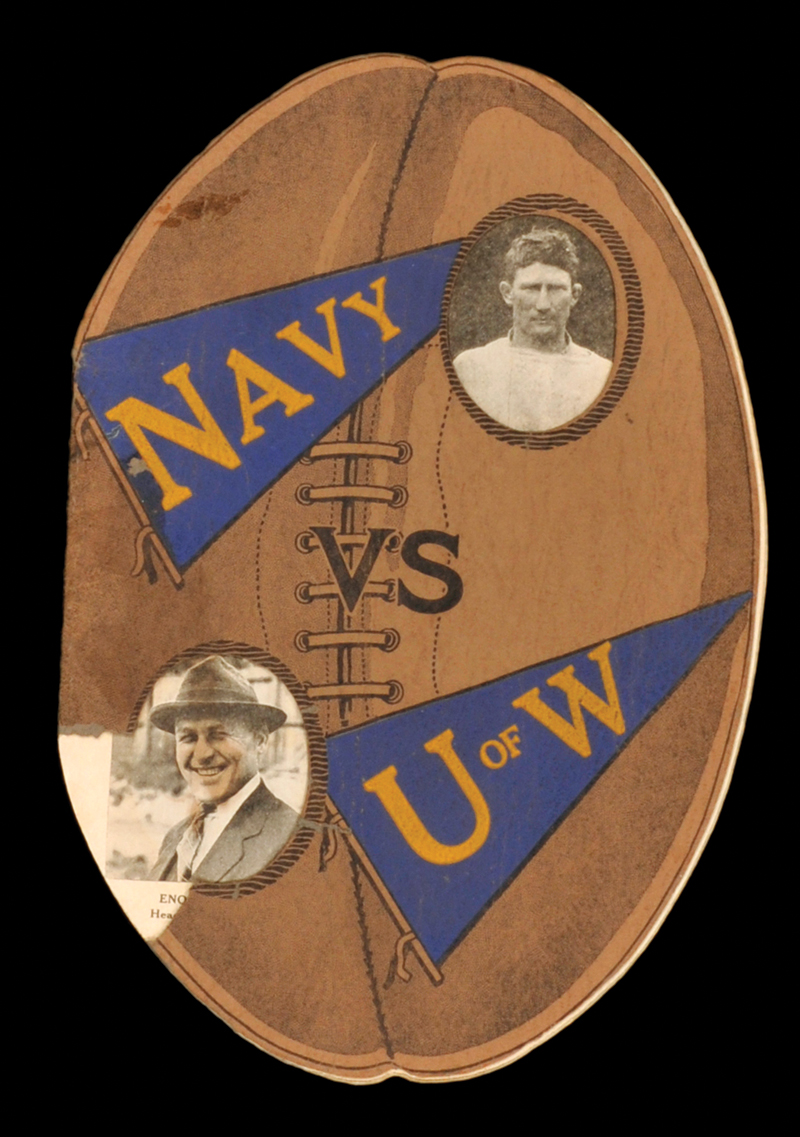
1924 Rose Bowl program cover
