= 1923 Pacific Badgers football team =

American college football season

1923 Pacific Badgers football
- Conference: Northwest Conference
- Record: 5–3 (2–3 Northwest)
- Head coach: Leo J. Frank (3rd season)
- Home stadium: McCready Field

1923 Northwest Conference football standings
	Conf.					Overall
Team	W		L		T	W		L		T
Washington $	6	–	0	–	0	10	–	1	–	1
Idaho	3	–	0	–	1	5	–	2	–	1
Oregon Agricultural	2	–	2	–	1	4	–	5	–	2
Oregon	3	–	3	–	1	3	–	4	–	1
Washington State	2	–	2	–	1	2	–	4	–	1
Pacific (OR)	2	–	3	–	0	5	–	3	–	0
Whitman	1	–	3	–	0	1	–	5	–	0
Montana	1	–	4	–	0	4	–	4	–	0
Willamette	0	–	3	–	0	2	–	5	–	1
$ – Conference champion

The 1923 Pacific Badgers football team represented Pacific University as a member of the Northwest Conference during the 1923 college football season. Under third-year head coach Leo J. Frank, the Badgers compiled an overall record of 5–3 with a mark of 2–3 in conference play, and finished sixth in the Northwest Conference.

== Schedule ==
Date	Opponent	Site	Result	Attendance	Source
September 29	at Oregon Agricultural	Bell Field; Corvallis, OR	L 0–12		
October 6	at Washington State	Rogers Field; Pullman, WA	L 0–19	4,000	
October 13	at Oregon	Hayward Field; Eugene, OR	L 7–35		
October 19	George Fox*	McCready Field; Forest Grove, OR	W 118–0		
October 27	at College of Idaho*	Cleaver Field; Caldwell, ID	W 32–0		
November 10	Puget Sound*	McCready Field; Forest Grove, OR	W 13–0		
November 23	at Willamette	Sweetland Field; Salem, OR	W 18–0		
December 1	vs. Montana	Multnomah Field; Portland, OR	W 6–0		
*Non-conference game
