= 1908 Washington football team =

American college football season

1908 Washington football
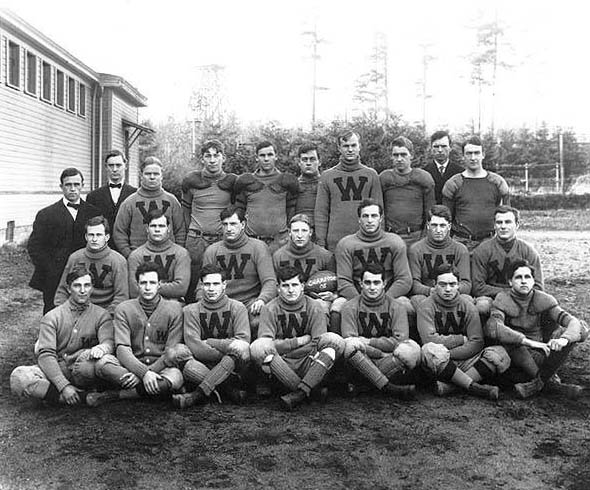

Northwest Conference champion
- Conference: Northwest Conference
- Record: 6–0–1 (3–0–1 Northwest)
- Head coach: Gil Dobie (1st season)
- Captain: Fred Tegtmeier
- Home stadium: Denny Field

1908 Northwest Conference football standings
	Conf.					Overall
Team	W		L		T	W		L		T
Washington $	3	–	0	–	1	6	–	0	–	1
Washington State	1	–	0	–	2	4	–	0	–	2
Oregon	1	–	2	–	0	5	–	2	–	0
Oregon Agricultural	1	–	2	–	0	4	–	3	–	1
Whitman	1	–	3	–	0	4	–	5	–	0
Idaho	0	–	2	–	1	2	–	2	–	2
$ – Conference champion

The 1908 Washington football team was an American football team that represented the University of Washington as a member of the Northwest Conference during the 1908 college football season. In its first season under coach Gil Dobie, the team compiled an overall record of 6–0–1 record with a mark of 3–0–1 in conference play, winning the Northwest Conference title, and outscored its opponents by a combined total of 128 to 15. Fred Tegtmeier was the team captain.

== Schedule ==
Date	Opponent	Site	Result	Attendance	Source
September 26	Lincoln High School*	Denny Field; Seattle, WA	W 22–0	500	
October 3	Washington High School*	Denny Field; Seattle, WA	W 23–5	500	
October 17	Whitworth*	Denny Field; Seattle, WA	W 24–4	2,500	
October 24	Whitman	Denny Field; Seattle, WA	W 6–0	3,000	
November 7	Washington State	Denny Field; Seattle, WA (rivalry)	T 6–6	4,000	
November 14	at Oregon	Kincaid Field; Eugene, OR (rivalry)	W 15–0	1,000	
November 26	Oregon Agricultural	Denny Field; Seattle, WA	W 32–0	6,000	
*Non-conference game; Source:
