= 1923 Willamette Bearcats football team =

American college football season

1923 Willamette Bearcats football
- Conference: Northwest Conference
- Record: 2–5–1 (0–3 Northwest)
- Head coach: Guy L. Rathbun (1st season)
- Home stadium: Sweetland Field

1923 Northwest Conference football standings
	Conf.					Overall
Team	W		L		T	W		L		T
Washington $	6	–	0	–	0	10	–	1	–	1
Idaho	3	–	0	–	1	5	–	2	–	1
Oregon Agricultural	2	–	2	–	1	4	–	5	–	2
Oregon	3	–	3	–	1	3	–	4	–	1
Washington State	2	–	2	–	1	2	–	4	–	1
Pacific (OR)	2	–	3	–	0	5	–	3	–	0
Whitman	1	–	3	–	0	1	–	5	–	0
Montana	1	–	4	–	0	4	–	4	–	0
Willamette	0	–	3	–	0	2	–	5	–	1
$ – Conference champion

The 1923 Willamette Bearcats football team represented Willamette University as a member of the Northwest Conference during the 1923 college football season. Under first-year head coach Guy L. Rathbun, the Bearcats compiled an overall record of 2–5–1 with a mark of 0–3 in conference play, and finished ninth in the Northwest Conference.

== Schedule ==
Date	Opponent	Site	Result	Attendance	Source
September 29	Oregon	Sweetland Field; Salem, OR	L 0–40	1,500	
October 6	at Washington	University of Washington Stadium; Seattle, WA	L 0–54	4,093	
October 27	Chemawa*	Sweetland Field; Salem, OR	W 35–0		
November 3	at Puget Sound*	Tacoma Stadium; Tacoma, WA	L 6–14		
November 10	Whitman	Sweetland Field; Salem, OR	L 0–10	2,500	
November 16	at Linfield*	McMinnville, OR	W 31–6		
November 23	Pacific (OR)	Sweetland Field; Salem, OR	L 0–18		
November 29	at College of Idaho*	Cleaver Field; Caldwell, ID	T 7–7		
*Non-conference game
