= Fred Abel =

American football player (1903–1980)

- Abel with the Washington Huskies

No. 5
- Position: Blocking back

Personal information
- Born: June 17, 1903; Lincoln, Kansas, U.S.
- Died: August 2, 1980 (aged 77); Port Townsend, Washington, U.S.
- Listed height: 5 ft 10 in (1.78 m)
- Listed weight: 170 lb (77 kg)

Career information
- High school: Montesano (Montesano, Washington)
- College: Washington

Career history
- Milwaukee Badgers (1926)
- Stats at Pro Football Reference

Fred Kenneth Abel (July 17, 1903 – August 2, 1980) was an American professional football player who was a blocking back for one season with the Milwaukee Badgers of the National Football League (NFL). He played college football for the Washington Huskies. As quarterback for the Huskies in the 1924 Rose Bowl, Abel threw a game-tying touchdown that settled the final score at 14–14.

== Early life and college ==
Fred Kenneth Abel was born on July 17, 1903, in Lincoln, Kansas. He attended Montesano High School in Montesano, Washington.

Abel was a member of the Washington Huskies of the University of Washington from 1921 to 1923 and a two-year letterman from 1922 to 1923. As quarterback for the Huskies in the 1924 Rose Bowl, Abel threw a game-tying touchdown that settled the final score at 14–14.

== Professional career ==
Abel signed with the Milwaukee Badgers of the National Football League in 1926. He played in three games, starting one, for the Badgers during the 1926 season before being released that year.

== Personal life ==
On January 6, 1924, in an article printed in the Tacoma Daily Ledger a few days after the Rose Bowl game, Abel denied that he was married to Dorothy Johnston, a 16-year-old high school girl. However, a few weeks later on January 22, the two were married. In December 1924, Abel filed for annulment after claiming he had been coerced into the marriage. They had reportedly never lived together. The annulment suit was eventually denied in February 1926. Dorothy then filed for divorce, which was granted in April 1926.

Abel attended the University of Michigan Law School. He died on August 2, 1980, in Port Townsend, Washington.
