= 1923 Oregon Webfoots football team =

American college football season

1923 Oregon Webfoots football
- Conference: Northwest Conference, Pacific Coast Conference
- Record: 3–4–1 (3–3–1 Northwest, 0–4–1 PCC)
- Head coach: Charles A. Huntington (6th season)
- Captain: Hal Chapman
- Home stadium: Hayward Field

1923 Northwest Conference football standings
| | Conf. | | | | | Overall |
| Team | W | | L | | T | W | | L | | T |
|---|---|---|---|---|---|---|---|---|---|---|
| Washington $ | 6 | – | 0 | – | 0 | 10 | – | 1 | – | 1 |
| Idaho | 3 | – | 0 | – | 1 | 5 | – | 2 | – | 1 |
| Oregon Agricultural | 2 | – | 2 | – | 1 | 4 | – | 5 | – | 2 |
| Oregon | 3 | – | 3 | – | 1 | 3 | – | 4 | – | 1 |
| Washington State | 2 | – | 2 | – | 1 | 2 | – | 4 | – | 1 |
| Pacific (OR) | 2 | – | 3 | – | 0 | 5 | – | 3 | – | 0 |
| Whitman | 1 | – | 3 | – | 0 | 1 | – | 5 | – | 0 |
| Montana | 1 | – | 4 | – | 0 | 4 | – | 4 | – | 0 |
| Willamette | 0 | – | 3 | – | 0 | 2 | – | 5 | – | 1 |
$ – Conference champion

1923 Pacific Coast Conference football standings
| | Conf. | | | | | Overall |
| Team | W | | L | | T | W | | L | | T |
|---|---|---|---|---|---|---|---|---|---|---|
| California $ | 5 | – | 0 | – | 0 | 9 | – | 0 | – | 1 |
| Washington^ | 4 | – | 1 | – | 0 | 10 | – | 1 | – | 1 |
| Stanford | 2 | – | 2 | – | 0 | 7 | – | 2 | – | 0 |
| USC | 2 | – | 2 | – | 0 | 6 | – | 2 | – | 0 |
| Idaho | 2 | – | 2 | – | 1 | 5 | – | 2 | – | 1 |
| Oregon Agricultural | 1 | – | 3 | – | 1 | 4 | – | 5 | – | 2 |
| Washington State | 1 | – | 3 | – | 1 | 2 | – | 4 | – | 1 |
| Oregon | 0 | – | 4 | – | 1 | 3 | – | 4 | – | 1 |
$ – Conference champion; ^ Selected as Rose Bowl representative

The 1923 Oregon Webfoots football team represented the University of Oregon as a member of the Northwest Conference and the Pacific Coast Conference (PCC) during the 1923 college football season. In their sixth and final season under head coach Charles A. Huntington, the Webfoots compiled an overall record of 3–4–1 record and outscored opponents 113 to 66. Oregon had a record of 3–3–1 in Northwest Conference play, placing in a three-way tie for third, and 0–4–1 against PCC opponents, finishing last out of eight teams. The team played home games on campus, at Hayward Field in Eugene, Oregon.

== Schedule ==
| Date | Time | Opponent | Site | Result | Attendance | Source |
|---|---|---|---|---|---|---|
| September 29 | | at Willamette | Sweetland Field; Salem, OR | W 40–0 | 1,500 | |
| October 13 | | Pacific (OR) | Hayward Field; Eugene, OR | W 35–7 | | |
| October 19 | | vs. Whitman | Round-Up Park; Pendleton, OR | W 21–0 | | |
| October 27 | 2:30 p.m. | Idaho | Hayward Field; Eugene, OR | T 0–0 | | |
| November 3 | | at Washington State | Rogers Field; Pullman, WA | L 7–13 | 6,000 | |
| November 10 | | Stanford | Multnomah Field; Portland, OR | L 3–14 | | |
| November 24 | | Oregon Agricultural | Hayward Field; Eugene, OR (rivalry) | L 0–6 | | |
| December 1 | | at Washington | Husky Stadium; Seattle, WA (rivalry) | L 7–26 | 12,000 | |
All times are in Pacific time
