= 1923 Montana Grizzlies football team =

American college football season

1923 Montana Grizzlies football
- Conference: Northwest Conference
- Record: 4–4 (1–4 Northwest)
- Head coach: John W. Stewart (2nd season)
- Home stadium: Dornblaser Field

1923 Northwest Conference football standings
	Conf.					Overall
Team	W		L		T	W		L		T
Washington $	6	–	0	–	0	10	–	1	–	1
Idaho	3	–	0	–	1	5	–	2	–	1
Oregon Agricultural	2	–	2	–	1	4	–	5	–	2
Oregon	3	–	3	–	1	3	–	4	–	1
Washington State	2	–	2	–	1	2	–	4	–	1
Pacific (OR)	2	–	3	–	0	5	–	3	–	0
Whitman	1	–	3	–	0	1	–	5	–	0
Montana	1	–	4	–	0	4	–	4	–	0
Willamette	0	–	3	–	0	2	–	5	–	1
$ – Conference champion

The 1923 Montana Grizzlies football team represented the University of Montana as a member of the Northwest Conference during the 1923 college football season. Led by second-year head coach John W. Stewart, the Montana Grizzlies compiled an overall record of 4–4 with a mark of 1–4 in conference play, placing eighth in the Northwest Conference.

== Schedule ==
Date	Opponent	Site	Result	Attendance	Source
October 6	Mount St. Charles*	Dornblaser Field; Missoula, MT	W 27–0		
October 12	at Idaho	MacLean Field; Moscow, ID (rivalry)	L 0–40		
October 20	Montana Mines	Dornblaser Field; Missoula, MT	W 25–0	3,000	
October 27	Gonzaga*	Dornblaser Field; Missoula, MT	L 2–25		
November 3	Whitman	Dornblaser Field; Missoula, MT	W 16–7		
November 10	at Washington	University of Washington Stadium; Seattle, WA	L 14–26	15,000	
November 17	at Montana State*	Gatton Field; Bozeman, MT (rivalry)	W 24–13		
December 1	at Pacific (OR)	Multnomah Field; Portland, OR	L 0–6		
*Non-conference game
