= 1908 Whitman Fighting Missionaries football team =

American college football season

1908 Whitman Fighting Missionaries football
- Conference: Northwest Conference
- Record: 4–5 (1–3 Northwest)
- Head coach: J. Merrill Blanchard (1st season)
- Home stadium: Ankeny Field

1908 Northwest Conference football standings
	Conf.					Overall
Team	W		L		T	W		L		T
Washington $	3	–	0	–	1	6	–	0	–	1
Washington State	1	–	0	–	2	4	–	0	–	2
Oregon	1	–	2	–	0	5	–	2	–	0
Oregon Agricultural	1	–	2	–	0	4	–	3	–	1
Whitman	1	–	3	–	0	4	–	5	–	0
Idaho	0	–	2	–	1	2	–	2	–	2
$ – Conference champion

The 1908 Whitman Fighting Missionaries football team represented Whitman College as a member of the Northwest Conference during the 1908 college football season. Under first-year head coach J. Merrill Blanchard, Whitman finished with a record of 4–5, with a mark of 1–3 in conference play for fifth place in the Northwest. Whitman played their home games at Ankeny Field in Walla Walla, Washington.

== Schedule ==
Date	Opponent	Site	Result	Attendance	Source
September 26	Walla Walla High School*	Ankeny Field; Walla Walla, WA	W		
October 10	Weston Normal School*	Ankeny Field; Walla Walla, WA	W 18–0		
October 16	Waitsburg High School (WA)*	Ankeny Field; Walla Walla, WA	W 10–0		
October 24	at Washington	Denny Field; Seattle, WA	L 0–6	3,000	
October 27	at Whitworth*	Athletic Park; Tacoma, WA	L 11–17		
November 6	Idaho	Ankeny Field; Walla Walla, WA	W 11–0		
November 11	at Oregon Agricultural	OAC Field; Corvallis, OR	L 0–9		
November 14	at Multnomah Athletic Club*	Multnomah Field; Portland, OR	L 5–11		
November 26	at Washington State	Rogers Field; Pullman, WA	L 0–4		
*Non-conference game; Source:
