= 1923 California Golden Bears football team =

American college football season

1923 California Golden Bears football

National champion (Houlgate) PCC champion
- Conference: Pacific Coast Conference
- Record: 9–0–1 (5–0 PCC)
- Head coach: Andy Smith (8th season)
- Offensive scheme: Short-punt
- Captain: Donald Nichols
- Home stadium: California Field; California Memorial Stadium

Uniform
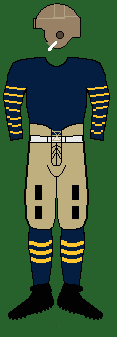

1923 Pacific Coast Conference football standings
	Conf.					Overall
Team	W		L		T	W		L		T
California $	5	–	0	–	0	9	–	0	–	1
Washington^	4	–	1	–	0	10	–	1	–	1
Stanford	2	–	2	–	0	7	–	2	–	0
USC	2	–	2	–	0	6	–	2	–	0
Idaho	2	–	2	–	1	5	–	2	–	1
Oregon Agricultural	1	–	3	–	1	4	–	5	–	2
Washington State	1	–	3	–	1	2	–	4	–	1
Oregon	0	–	4	–	1	3	–	4	–	1
$ – Conference champion; ^ Selected as Rose Bowl representative

The 1923 California Golden Bears football team was an American football team that represented the University of California, Berkeley in the Pacific Coast Conference (PCC) during the 1923 college football season. In their eighth year under head coach Andy Smith, the team compiled a 9–0–1 record (5–0 against PCC opponents), shut out nine of ten opponents, won the PCC championship, and outscored its opponents by a combined total of 182 to 7. The team was selected retroactively as a 1923 national champion by Deke Houlgate, who used his math system to award annual national titles from 1929 to 1958.

== Schedule ==
Date	Opponent	Site	Result	Attendance	Source
September 22	California alumni*	California Field; Berkeley, CA	W 3–0		
September 29	Saint Mary's*	California Field; Berkeley, CA	W 49–0		
October 6	Santa Clara*	California Field; Berkeley, CA	W 48–0	10,000	
October 13	Olympic Club*	California Field; Berkeley, CA	W 16–0		
October 20	Oregon Agricultural*	California Field; Berkeley, CA	W 26–0		
October 27	vs. Washington State	Multnomah Field; Portland, OR	W 9–0	8,000	
November 3	Nevada	California Field; Berkeley, CA	T 0–0		
November 10	at USC	Los Angeles Memorial Coliseum; Los Angeles, CA	W 13–7	72,000	
November 17	Washington	California Field; Berkeley, CA	W 9–0	28,000	
November 24	Stanford	California Memorial Stadium; Berkeley, CA (Big Game)	W 9–0	75,000	
*Non-conference game; Source:

== Roster ==
- Ball, C
- Stewart N. Beam, T
- Berlin, T
- Arthur Le Roy Best, G
- William F. Blewett, FB
- Brown, FB
- Bunger, T
- Dana Carey, G
- James A. Dixon, HB
- Dodson, HB
- Richard M. Dunn, HB
- F. Howard Evans, QB
- Francis, T
- Edwin C. Horrell, C
- Hufford, E
- Talma W. Imlay, QB
- King, QB
- Charles N. Mell, E
- Don Newmeyer, T
- Donald Nichols, HB
- Nickelman, G
- Donald C. Perry, G
- Powers, C
- Walter F. Rau
- Saunby, G
- Pete Schaffnit, E
- James E. Spalding, HB
- Tait, QB
- Thatcher, E
- Topham, C
- Francis S. West
- White, T
- John I. Witter, FB
- Young, E
