= 1924 Rose Bowl =

American college football game

- 10th Rose Bowl Game
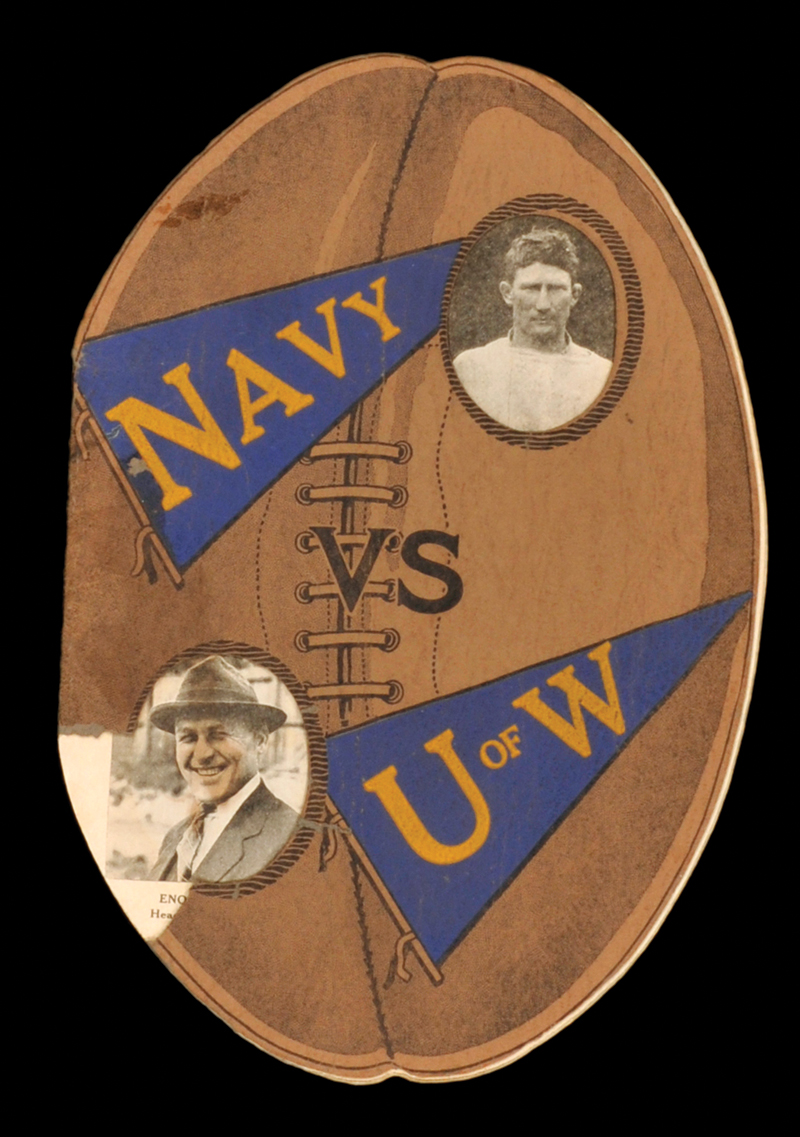
- The cover to the 1924 Rose Bowl program
Washington Huskies	Navy Midshipmen
(8–1)	(5–1–2)
PCC	Independent
14	14
Head coach: Enoch Bagshaw	Head coach: Bob Folwell
	1	2	3	4	Total
Washington	0	7	0	7	14
Navy	0	14	0	0	14
- Date: January 1, 1924
- Season: 1923
- Stadium: Rose Bowl Stadium
- Location: Pasadena, California
- Player of the Game: Ira McKee (Navy QB)
- National anthem: Navy Band
- Attendance: 40,000 (Note: Most sources, such as the Pasadena Tournament of Roses and the Detroit Free Press, gave the attendance as 40,000, while the Boston Globe and the Rochester Evening Journal gave the attendance as 48,000.)

The 1924 Rose Bowl was a postseason American college football bowl game played between the independent Navy Midshipmen and the Washington Huskies, a member of the Pacific Coast Conference (PCC). The game took place on January 1, 1924, at the Rose Bowl stadium in Pasadena, California, closing the 1923 college football season. The game opened in front of approximately 40,000 people and ended in a 14–14 tie. It was the first post-season bowl game for both teams. The 1924 game was the tenth edition of the Rose Bowl, which had first been played in 1902. Following the inaugural game's blowout score, football was replaced with chariot races until 1916. The Rose Bowl stadium had been constructed in 1923, making this edition the second game played in the arena.

The game's organizers had previously selected a team from the East Coast and the West Coast, and asked the Washington Huskies to represent the West Coast. Washington requested that the Navy Midshipmen be their opponents, and Navy accepted. Washington selected Navy in favor of several teams from the east which had amassed better records. Both teams had suffered only a single loss during the season, but Washington had won eight games compared with Navy's five, although Navy had also amassed two ties. Predictions gave Washington a slight advantage in the game due to the weight difference between the teams: the Washington players were on average 10 pounds (4.5 kg) heavier than those of Navy.

The game kicked off in the afternoon; heavy rain showers had fallen the day before, causing a slight delay. The first quarter was scoreless, but Navy scored a touchdown on the first play of the second quarter. Washington answered Navy with a 23-yard touchdown run on the next drive. Near the end of the second quarter, Navy scored a touchdown on a two-yard run, giving them a 14–7 halftime lead. The third quarter was a defensive stalemate as neither team scored. Navy fumbled the ball on their own ten-yard line late in the quarter. Four plays afterward, Washington tied the game on a 12-yard touchdown pass. Navy threw an interception at midfield, and Washington drove down to the Navy 20-yard line before attempting a game-winning field goal. The kick missed and the game ended shortly afterwards.

For his performance in the game, Navy quarterback Ira McKee was named the Most Valuable Player. Navy led in nearly every statistical aspect of the contest. Washington returned to the Rose Bowl at the end of the 1925 season, falling to the Alabama Crimson Tide 20–19. Navy did not participate in another bowl game until 1955, when their squad, nicknamed the "team named desire", upset the Ole Miss Rebels in the Sugar Bowl. Since the 1924 Rose Bowl, Navy and Washington have met five more times; the Huskies won three games.

== Team selection ==
The Rose Bowl game was first played in 1902, as a way to help fund the Rose Parade. Because of the first contest's lopsided score, a football game was not played again until 1916, having been replaced by chariot races. Between 1902 and 1947, the Rose Bowl was played between a team from the East Coast and a team from the West Coast. Until the construction of the Rose Bowl stadium, which began hosting the game in 1923, it was called the "Tournament East–West football game". Because the Pacific Coast Conference (PCC) was the only conference with teams located in the Western United States, a school from the conference had been chosen for every Rose Bowl game. The tournament committee invited the University of Washington Huskies to participate in the 1924 game, and they accepted. Washington was then allowed by the organization to select its opponent for the game—the first time a team was allowed to do so. Washington chose the Navy Midshipmen based on a suggestion from the committee, and Navy accepted the invitation.

=== Navy ===
The Navy Midshipmen entered the Rose Bowl under coach Bob Folwell with five wins, one loss, and two ties (5–1–2). Navy's sole loss in the 1923 season came in their annual game against Penn State, which they lost 3-21. All five of Navy's wins came against eastern teams, including Colgate and William and Mary, and two of Navy's wins were shutouts, against Colgate and Saint Xavier. Navy tied 0–0 with Army in the 1923 Army–Navy Game, the last game of the season, played on November 23 in front of nearly 70,000 spectators—including high-ranking military officials. Their other tie was a 3–3 game against Princeton. Navy was selected by Washington to participate in the Rose Bowl, although several teams with better records were eligible. Both Cornell and Yale finished the season with an undefeated 8–0 record. Eleven teams finished with only one loss, including Furman (10–1), Notre Dame (9–1), and the Virginia Military Institute (VMI) (9–1).

=== Washington ===
The Washington Huskies entered the 1924 Rose Bowl with a record of eight wins and one loss (8–1) under coach Enoch Bagshaw. Washington opened their season with victories over teams from the battleships Mississippi and New York; because these teams did not represent colleges, they were not considered an official part of Washington's schedule. Washington's first official game ended with a 34–0 shutout of Willamette, which was followed by four more shutouts. Washington's next game was a 26–14 victory over PCC opponent Montana—the first points Washington allowed all season. The squad's following game was their sole loss: a 9–0 shutout by conference opponent California. Washington finished the regular season with two straight wins over conference opponents, including a victory in the Apple Cup over Washington State.

== Pre-game buildup ==
The 1924 Rose Bowl was the first meeting between Navy and Washington, and was the first bowl game that either team participated in. The competitors were announced on November 30, 1923, and the teams arrived for the bowl in mid-December, holding practices until the evening before the game. Heavy rain fell the night before the competition; Bagshaw said, "Wet weather will not bother us", and Folwell said, "My men will know what to do in the mud and will be there doing it". However, because of the wet conditions, several football critics predicted that Washington would have a slight advantage in the game due to their larger size. It was estimated that 52,000 people would attend the game. For the first time, the participating teams were responsible for ticket sales, and as a result only 40,000 people actually attended; a large number of tickets were sold to a navy fleet which was called to service on December 31, the day before the game. The competition was the first Rose Bowl to be broadcast on radio, and was aired by a local Pasadena station.

=== Navy ===
During the 1923 football season, the Navy Midshipmen outscored their opponents 133–43, led by quarterback Ira McKee, who threw several touchdown passes throughout the year. Navy's other offensive strong point was running back Carl Cullen, who ran for several hundred yards during the season. The Navy defense was considered weak by football critics, with an average player weight 10 pounds (4.5 kg) less than that of Washington. Navy's defense had stopped running plays successfully during the regular season, but had trouble defending pass plays. Navy's special teams were considered by critics to be decent, about even with those of Washington.

=== Washington ===
The Washington Huskies had outscored their opponents 203–37 during the regular season, excluding the games against New York and Mississippi. Washington's running backs, George "Wildcat" Wilson and Elmer Tesreau, led their offense during the season, each gaining several hundred rushing yards. However, Tesreau was suffering from boils on his knee, and his coaches urged him to not play in the Rose Bowl. The Washington defense was considered superior to that of Navy, being much larger on average. Washington's defense had been very effective during the regular season, holding five teams scoreless and allowing more than ten points to be scored against them only once. Washington's special teams were considered to be average.

== Game summary ==
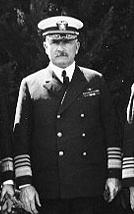
Navy Admiral Samuel Shelburne Robison was in attendance for the game.

The kickoff for the Rose Bowl was originally scheduled for 2:00 p.m. on January 1, 1924, but the night before the game, a meeting of the Rose Bowl organization rescheduled the kickoff time to 2:16 p.m. the same day. This was likely due to poor field conditions caused by the previous night's rain. The opening ceremonies were the most elaborate of any bowl game up to that time, with numerous events held. Navy admiral Samuel Shelburne Robison received an admiral's salute from Navy's band when he took his seat. The Navy band and the color guard of the marines performed the National Anthem, then the marine color guard hoisted the U.S. flag over the field. Both teams' mascots were walked around the field before the kickoff. The Tournament of Roses predicted that tickets would be sold out by the day of the game, but actual ticket sales were much lower than they had hoped. Still, sales were higher than those of several previous competitions.

=== First half ===
The game began at the rescheduled time, with a temperature of 52 °F (11 °C) and the field still wet. Because of the playing conditions, running plays were ineffective, which caused problems for the Washington offense. Navy instead used passing plays, which the Washington defense had trouble stopping. Navy was driving down to the 22-yard line of Washington when the first quarter ended. Navy controlled the first quarter, completing all six passing attempts and holding the Washington offense to under 100 yards gained.

On their first play of the second quarter, Navy scored a touchdown on a pass play from Ira McKee to Carl Cullen. McKee kicked the extra point for Navy, giving them a 7–0 lead. In an attempt to trick Washington, Navy tried an onside kick on the next play, but Washington recovered the ball. After two short running plays, Washington quarterback Fred Abel completed a 23-yard pass to running back Kinsley Dubois, bringing Washington inside the 25-yard line. On the next play, running back George Wilson ran the ball 23 yards for a touchdown. Washington's kicker converted the extra point to tie the game at 7–7. After several drives from each team that did not result in further scoring, Navy completed a 57-yard pass down to the Washington eight-yard line. Two plays later, Ira McKee ran the ball in from two yards out for a touchdown, then afterward converted the extra point. The first half ended with Navy leading by 14–7, having completed all 11 passes they attempted.

=== Second half ===
Both teams' defenses controlled the third quarter, allowing no points to be scored. Navy's McKee completed three more pass plays before his first incompletion, which came on his fourteenth attempt. Washington's offense had little success in the third quarter, being held to only a few yards gained and turning the ball over once. In the fourth quarter, after several unsuccessful drives by each team, Navy made a major error. After being stopped on their own 26-yard line, Navy improperly lined up in a punt formation, and the center successfully snapped the ball over the punter's head. The ball was recovered by Washington on the Navy ten-yard line. Washington lost two yards in three plays, and faced a fourth down from the Navy 12-yard line. Washington stacked their offensive line, allowing their left guard, James Bryan, to become an eligible receiver. Fred Abel passed the ball to Bryan, who caught it just short of the goal line and walked into the end zone for the touchdown. Washington's kicker then converted the extra point, tying the game at 14.

Navy received the ball from Washington and began to throw it erratically. After gaining several yards, Ira McKee threw an interception near midfield. On the next play, Fred Abel threw a long pass to George Wilson, who was tackled on the Navy 20-yard line after gaining 30 yards. Washington brought out their placekicker, Leonard Ziel, to kick a 32-yard field goal, which would have won them the game. Ziel kicked the ball about a yard short of the upright, giving the ball back to Navy with the game still tied. A few plays later the game ended in a 14–14 tie.

== Statistical summary ==
Statistical comparison
	NAVY	WASH
First Downs	15	9
Total yards	362	202
Passing yards	175	65
Rushing yards	187	137
Passing	16–20	3–8
Penalties	2–10	4–20
Turnovers	2	2
Punts–Average	5–33.8	9–33

For his performance in the 1924 Rose Bowl, Navy quarterback Ira McKee was awarded Most Valuable Player (MVP) honors. McKee completed 16 of 20 passes for a total of 175 yards, including one pass for a touchdown. McKee also had 85 rushing yards on twelve attempts. Washington running back Elmer Tesreau was given the game's Ironman Award, though he had little effect on the game. Against the urging of his coaches, Tesreau had played with boils completely covering one knee. He left near the end of the game, and was later discovered to have broken his previously unaffected leg in multiple places. (Note: Sources disagree regarding how many places Tesreau's leg was broken. Some, including those from the Rose Bowl, state that his leg was broken in two places, while others, such as the Berkeley Daily Gazette, say that his leg was broken in three places.)

Navy's McKee threw for a perfect 11 of 11 passes during the first half, but completed just five of nine attempts during the second half. Two of these incompletions were interceptions. McKee outthrew Washington's Fred Abel by 110 yards. Carl Cullen was McKee's main receiver for the game, catching ten passes from him, one of which was taken for a touchdown. The other six passes were caught by other receivers. On the ground, Cullen rushed for the most yards of any player, gaining 102 throughout the course of the game. McKee was Navy's key runner, gaining 85 yards. Cullen, McKee and fullback Alan Shapley, and other team members rushed for a total of 187 yards during the game. McKee completed both extra point attempts, and the squad's punter kicked five times, for an average distance of 33.8 yards.

Abel attempted eight passes during the game, and completed just three for a total of 65 yards. Of Abel's five incompletions, two were interceptions. Kinsley Dubois caught two of Abel's completed passes, amassing 53 receiving yards. Guard James Bryan caught the other, a 12-yard touchdown pass. George Wilson led Washington in rushing yards, gaining 87 over the course of the game, and scoring Washington's only rushing touchdown. Kinsley Dubois came next, gaining 30 yards, followed by Abel, with 20. The remainder of the team's 137 rushing yards were amassed by others, including Tesreau. Washington's kicker Leonard Zeil was two for two on extra points, but missed his only field goal attempt. Washington punted nine times, averaging 33 yards per attempt.

== Aftermath ==
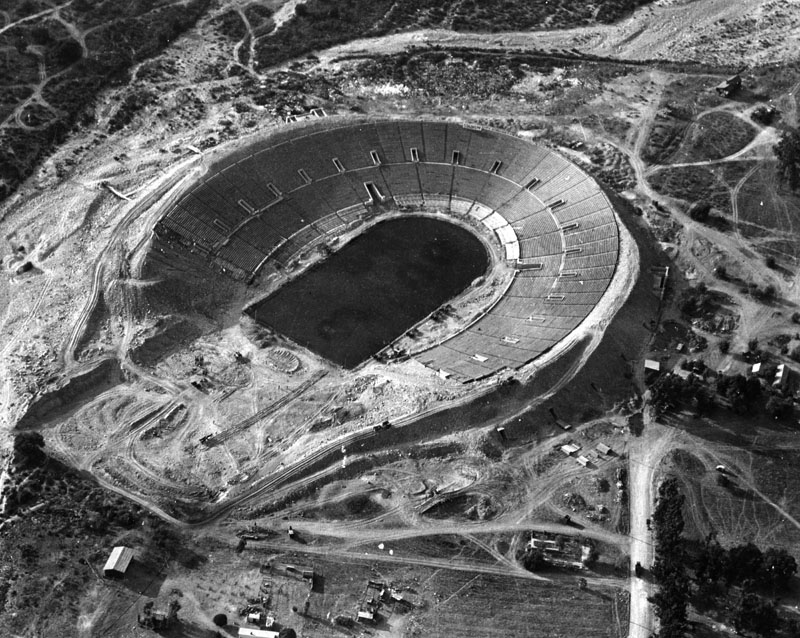
The Rose Bowl stadium under construction in 1921, showing its horseshoe seating design. Due to increasing attendance from the 1924 game and subsequent ones, the open end was closed off and additional seating was added.

The tie gave Washington an 8–1–1 record for the 1923 season. Navy's record went to 5–1–3, a slight improvement from the previous year, when the team went 5–2. It became Navy's eighth straight winning season.

Washington went 8–1–1 in the 1924 season, remaining under the direction of coach Enoch Bagshaw. The team was invited to the 1926 Rose Bowl after completing an undefeated 11–0–1 1925 season. They lost the game to the Alabama Crimson Tide by a score of 20–19. Washington finished the 1920s with an overall record of 65–26–6; Bagshaw coached the team for every season except 1920, when they were under the leadership of Stub Allison. Navy finished the 1924 season with a 2–6 record, ending their number of consecutive winning seasons at eight. The Navy football team was not invited to participate in another bowl game until 1955, when the "team named desire", so named due to coach Eddie Erdelatz comparing the squad to the play A Streetcar Named Desire, defeated the Ole Miss Rebels in the Sugar Bowl 21–0. Navy finished the 1920s with a record of 55–22–8; nine of the ten seasons ended in winning records. Navy's coach, Bob Folwell, left the team after the 1924 season, to be replaced by Jack Owsley. Navy and Washington have since met five times, with Washington currently leading the series 3–2–1.

Because the 1924 Rose Bowl and several later Rose Bowls had very high ticket sales, the Tournament of Roses Association decided to close off the southern end of the Rose Bowl stadium and expand the seating from a horseshoe design to one that surrounded the entire field. The 1924 game was the first in which the Tournament of Roses made participating schools responsible for ticket sales. The strategy has been used since, with only a small number of tickets allocated to Tournament officials for each yearly edition.
