= 1923 Idaho Vandals football team =

American college football season

1923 Idaho Vandals football
- Conference: Northwest Conference, Pacific Coast Conference
- Record: 5–2–1 (3–0–1 Northwest, 2–2–1 PCC)
- Head coach: Robert L. Mathews (2nd season)
- Home stadium: MacLean Field

1923 Northwest Conference football standings
	Conf.					Overall
Team	W		L		T	W		L		T
Washington $	6	–	0	–	0	10	–	1	–	1
Idaho	3	–	0	–	1	5	–	2	–	1
Oregon Agricultural	2	–	2	–	1	4	–	5	–	2
Oregon	3	–	3	–	1	3	–	4	–	1
Washington State	2	–	2	–	1	2	–	4	–	1
Pacific (OR)	2	–	3	–	0	5	–	3	–	0
Whitman	1	–	3	–	0	1	–	5	–	0
Montana	1	–	4	–	0	4	–	4	–	0
Willamette	0	–	3	–	0	2	–	5	–	1
$ – Conference champion

1923 Pacific Coast Conference football standings
	Conf.					Overall
Team	W		L		T	W		L		T
California $	5	–	0	–	0	9	–	0	–	1
Washington^	4	–	1	–	0	10	–	1	–	1
Stanford	2	–	2	–	0	7	–	2	–	0
USC	2	–	2	–	0	6	–	2	–	0
Idaho	2	–	2	–	1	5	–	2	–	1
Oregon Agricultural	1	–	3	–	1	4	–	5	–	2
Washington State	1	–	3	–	1	2	–	4	–	1
Oregon	0	–	4	–	1	3	–	4	–	1
$ – Conference champion; ^ Selected as Rose Bowl representative

The 1923 Idaho Vandals football team represented the University of Idaho as a member of the Northwest Conference and the Pacific Coast Conference (PCC) during the 1923 college football season. Led by first-year head coach Robert L. Mathews, the Vandals compiled an overall record of 5–2–1. Idaho had a record of 3–0–1 in Northwest Conference play, placing second, and 2–2–1 against PCC opponents, placing in a three-way tie for third. The team played home games on campus, at MacLean Field in Moscow, Idaho.

Idaho opened the season with two convincing non-conference victories, then shut out neighbor Washington State 14–0 in the Battle of the Palouse across the border at Rogers Field in Pullman, breaking an eight-game losing streak in the series. It was the first of three consecutive wins over the Cougars in the rivalry. The Vandals did not break the winless streak against Oregon, but battled to a scoreless tie at Hayward Field in Eugene. Idaho remained undefeated after six games, all shutouts, but lost the final two on the road in California.

== Schedule ==
Date	Time	Opponent	Site	Result	Attendance	Source
October 6		College of Idaho*	MacLean Field; Moscow, ID	W 83–0		
October 12		Montana	MacLean Field; Moscow, ID (rivalry)	W 40–0		
October 19		at Washington State	Rogers Field; Pullman, WA (Battle of the Palouse)	W 14–0	9,000	
October 27	2:30 p.m.	at Oregon	Hayward Field; Eugene, OR	T 0–0		
November 3		Gonzaga*	MacLean Field; Moscow, ID	W 13–0		
November 10	1:00 p.m.	vs. Oregon Agricultural	Cody Park; Boise, ID	W 7–0	7,000	
November 17		at Stanford	Stanford Stadium; Stanford CA	L 7–17		
November 24		at USC	Los Angeles Memorial Coliseum; Los Angeles, CA	L 0–9	30,000	
*Non-conference game; All times are in Pacific time
