= 1923 USC Trojans football team =

American college football season

1923 USC Trojans football
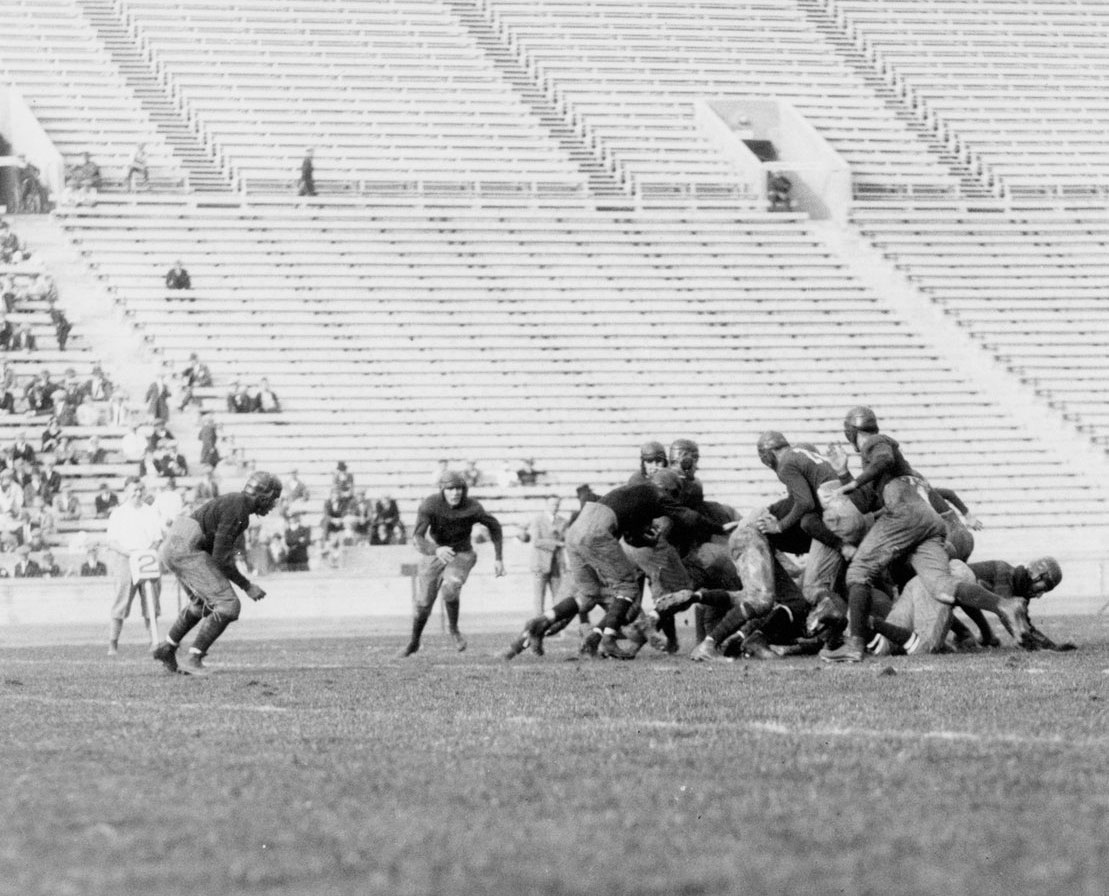
- Pomona plays USC at the inaugural game at the Los Angeles Coliseum
- Conference: Pacific Coast Conference
- Record: 6–2 (2–2 PCC)
- Head coach: Gus Henderson (5th season)
- Captain: Chet Dolley
- Home stadium: Bovard Field, Los Angeles Memorial Coliseum

1923 Pacific Coast Conference football standings
	Conf.					Overall
Team	W		L		T	W		L		T
California $	5	–	0	–	0	9	–	0	–	1
Washington^	4	–	1	–	0	10	–	1	–	1
Stanford	2	–	2	–	0	7	–	2	–	0
USC	2	–	2	–	0	6	–	2	–	0
Idaho	2	–	2	–	1	5	–	2	–	1
Oregon Agricultural	1	–	3	–	1	4	–	5	–	2
Washington State	1	–	3	–	1	2	–	4	–	1
Oregon	0	–	4	–	1	3	–	4	–	1
$ – Conference champion; ^ Selected as Rose Bowl representative

The 1923 USC Trojans football team represented the University of Southern California (USC) in the 1923 college football season. In their fourth year under head coach Gus Henderson, the Trojans compiled a 6–2 record (2–2 against conference opponents), finished in a tie for fourth place in the Pacific Coast Conference, and outscored their opponents by a combined total of 173 to 62. On October 6, 1923, the Trojans played their first game in the Los Angeles Memorial Coliseum, a 23–7 victory over the Pomona Sagehens.

== Schedule ==
Date	Opponent	Site	Result	Attendance	Source
September 29	Caltech*	Bovard Field; Los Angeles, CA	W 18–7	10,000	
October 6	Pomona*	Los Angeles Memorial Coliseum; Los Angeles, CA	W 23–7	12,863–20,000	
October 13	Nevada*	Los Angeles Memorial Coliseum; Los Angeles, CA	W 33–0	20,000	
October 20	at Washington	University of Washington Stadium; Seattle, WA	L 0–22	21,500	
October 27	at Stanford	Stanford Stadium; Stanford, CA (rivalry)	W 14–7	20,000	
November 10	California	Los Angeles Memorial Coliseum; Los Angeles, CA	L 7–13	72,000	
November 17	Arizona*	Los Angeles Memorial Coliseum; Los Angeles, CA	W 69–6	7,000–12,000	
November 24	Idaho	Los Angeles Memorial Coliseum; Los Angeles, CA	W 9–0	30,000	
*Non-conference game
