= 1908 Oregon Agricultural Aggies football team =

American college football season

1908 Oregon Agricultural Aggies football
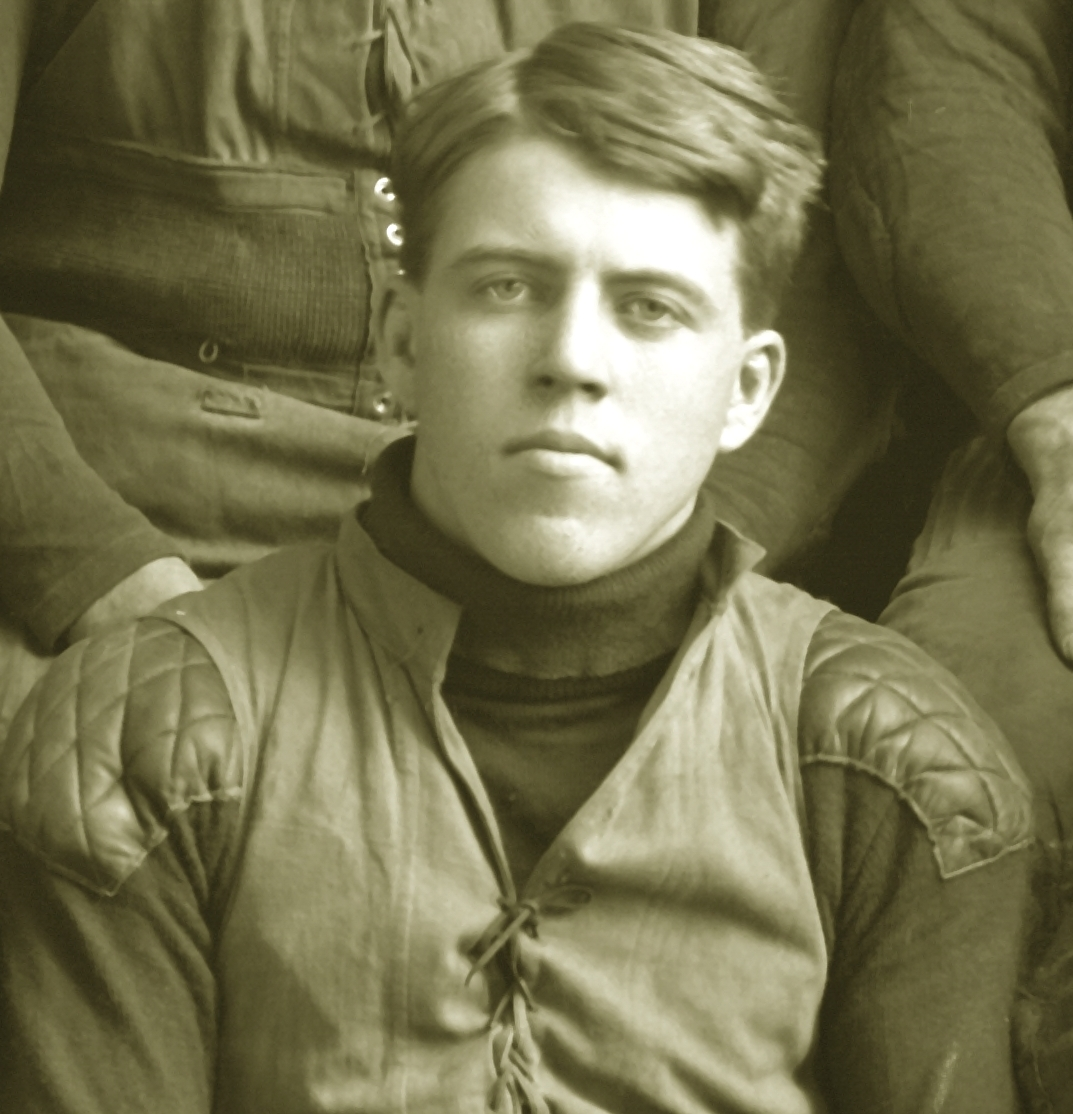
- Coach Fred Norcross in 1903
- Conference: Northwest Conference
- Record: 4–3–1 (1–2 Northwest)
- Head coach: Fred Norcross (3rd season)
- Captain: Carl Wolff
- Home stadium: OAC Field

1908 Northwest Conference football standings
	Conf.					Overall
Team	W		L		T	W		L		T
Washington $	3	–	0	–	1	6	–	0	–	1
Washington State	1	–	0	–	2	4	–	0	–	2
Oregon	1	–	2	–	0	5	–	2	–	0
Oregon Agricultural	1	–	2	–	0	4	–	3	–	1
Whitman	1	–	3	–	0	4	–	5	–	0
Idaho	0	–	2	–	1	2	–	2	–	2
$ – Conference champion

The 1908 Oregon Agricultural Aggies football team represented Oregon Agricultural College (OAC)—now known as Oregon State University—as a member of the Northwest Conference during the 1908 college football season. In their third and final season under head coach Fred Norcross, the Aggies compiled an overall record of 4–3–1 record with a mark of 1–2 in conference play, tying for third place in the Northwest Conference, and outscored their opponents by a combined total of 83 to 51. Against major opponents, the Aggies lost to Oregon (8–0) and Washington (32–0).

== Schedule ==
Date	Opponent	Site	Result	Attendance	Source
October 10	O.A.C. alumni*	OAC Field; Corvallis, OR	T 0–0		
October 17	Puget Sound*	OAC Field; Corvallis, OR	W 26–0		
October 24	The Dalles Athletic Club*	OAC Field; Corvallis, OR	W 10–0		
November 7	Willamette*	OAC Field; Corvallis, OR	W 28–0		
November 11	Whitman	OAC Field; Corvallis, OR	W 9–0		
November 21	vs. Oregon	Multnomah Field; Portland, OR (rivalry)	L 0–8	8,000	
November 26	at Washington	Denny Field; Seattle, WA	L 0–32	6,000	
December 5	at Multnomah Athletic Club*	Multnomah Field; Portland, OR	L 10–11		
*Non-conference game

== Season summary ==
=== Background ===
Students began to return to Corvallis during the last week of September, with registration for the coming year projected at 1,400 students. Despite the construction of 100 new houses, a shortage of living facilities was projected, with many families in town opening up their homes to students in exchange for room and board ranging from $4 to $5 per week.

The community anxiously awaited the return of their gridiron heroes, with the Corvallis Gazette making front page news of the fact that a record 93 young men had signed up for football in 1908 – a total said to be the largest of any school in the Northwest. Head coach Fred Norcross hired four assistant coaches for the season to make sure that every prospective player was provided with a comprehensive try-out. The team's hopes for the 1908 campaign were further bolstered by news that All-Northwest Tackle Jamieson would be returning to the field for the Aggies after flirting with a transfer to Utah Agricultural College.

Early plans were laid for a special excursion to the November 21 game against the arch-rival University of Oregon Webfoots, slated to be held on neutral grounds in Portland. It was estimated that between 1,000 and 1,500 fans would make the northward trek from Corvallis and Eugene to see the match, with some 500 OAC students headed by a 40-piece band anticipated to be among the throng.

=== October 17: University of Puget Sound ===
The Aggies played their first "real" game of the 1908 season against the University of Puget Sound. The match was won by OAC by a score of 26–0.

=== October 24: The Dalles Athletic Club ===
OAC's third game of the year was against The Dalles Athletic Club of The Dalles, Oregon. Few details of the contest have been preserved outside of the winning score of 10–0 for the Aggies.

=== November 7: Willamette University ===
The Aggies trounced Willamette University in their fourth contest of the season, racing to a 23–0 lead at halftime en route to a 28–0 shutout of the Bearcats. After holding Willamette to just 10 yards in their first possession, the Aggies took over after a punt on their own 10 yard line and promptly marched 90 yards for their first score, with only two minutes of game time elapsed. The backfield of Hastings, Wolff, and Keck ripped off long run after long run, crossing the goal line three times by intermission. In the second half the Aggies declined to run up the score by trying a series of long field goals, missing several. A final touchdown was scored by Keck of the Aggies in the second half, with a second scoring bid, a long kick return by OAC captain Carl Wolff, called back due to a penalty.

=== November 11: Whitman College ===
Commerce virtually shut down in sleepy downtown Corvallis on Wednesday, November 11, with the stands filling with home-team orange to witness an afternoon of football at the local field. Gates opened at 1 pm and with an hour-long tilt between the freshman and sophomores prior to the headline varsity match. The action started at 3:10, with OAC winning the coin toss and electing to receive. The opening drive was halted and a defensive battle ensued, with the teams exchanging several punts. Near the close of the half OAC hit on a field goal attempt and took a 3–0 lead to halftime.

In the second half, OAC kicked off, with Whitman returning the ball to the 25. A fumble was immediately lost to the Aggies at the 32-yard line, putting the home team in excellent field position, but the ball was promptly turned back over on an intercepted forward pass. Whitman drove the ball on the next possession but fumbled again, with OAC this time driving the ball to paydirt and a 9–0 lead. Whitman was deflated by the second score and thereafter never seriously threatened.

=== November 21: vs. University of Oregon ===
Pinback and ribbon in school colors produced for OAC football fans by a Corvallis department store

On the neutral turf of Multnomah Field in Portland, the OAC Aggies suffered a bitter defeat at the hands of their rivals from down the road, the University of Oregon Webfoots. Some 1,260 fans packed a special train running up the valley to Portland for the annual gridiron showdown between the state's two most prominent schools. OAC army cadets wore their uniforms, banners were waved, megaphones were raised, and enthusiasm was at a peak. Performance on the field left something to be desired, however, as one local newspaper lamented:

"The result of the game was a great surprise, not only to the student body, but every denizen of Corvallis was touched with deep sympathy for the boys when the first bulletin was posted, and it fell like a mud-ball against a brand new $10 silk hat. With the splendid record made by the boys in laying the goose-egg at the feet of all comers for the past two years, it was a hard dose to have both eyes blacked inside of 30 minutes. But the boys know how to take their medicine and have the sweet consolation of knowing that they did the same thing to Eugene a year ago."

The game was won in the first half by the Lemon Yellows with a pair of four-point place kicks by Oregon captain Fred Moullen. The first score came after ten minutes of play and the second in the closing minutes of the opening half. OAC's Carl Wolff made eight tries at field goals, missing them all; in addition to his two makes, U of O's Moullen failed in four other field goal bids, three of which only missing the uprights narrowly. Also starring for Oregon was Quarterback "Sap" Latuorette, who broke a number of long runs and made several catches, helping to keep the Aggies out of scoring position all day in what was ultimately a field position battle.

Ten thousand people saw the game in all, with the OAC fans clad in orange and the U of O fans clad in yellow. The crowd was said to be "possibly the greatest at any football game played in the Pacific Northwest" despite a heavy, drenching downpour of rain and a field reduced to a sea of mud.

=== November 26: at University of Washington ===
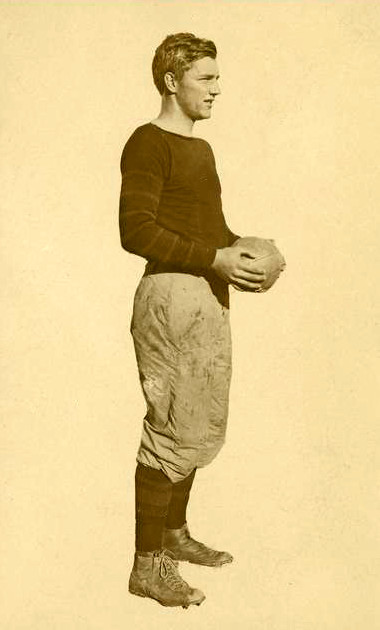
OAC Fullback Walter Keck in a postcard image

The vaunted OAC Aggies followed their upset loss to the University of Oregon with a Thanksgiving Day massacre at the hands of the University of Washington Huskies, who not only won 32–0, but who very nearly scored two more touchdowns with drives halted at the one-yard line. OAC was unable to move the ball against the rugged Washington defenders, while superior team speed on the dry field allowed the Huskies to rampage for about 325 yards in the first half alone.

According to one account:

"The Washington Ends nailed the recipient of a punt in his tracks time after time, while OAC's punts were always returned from 5 to 15 yards. Washington was stronger, both on offense and defense, than the visitors. There was a finish to her open plays that did not show with the 'Aggies.' Washington handled the forward pass beautifully, although she did not use it a great deal. For 20 minutes in the first half OAC was unable to do anything at all at carrying the ball."

Although OAC played better in the second half, Washington made the game a route with three more touchdowns, including a 55-yard pass catch by Grimm.

=== December 5: at Multnomah Athletic Club ===
The Aggies brought their by now disappointing 1908 campaign to a close with a December 5 game against the Multnomah Athletic Club team from Portland. The Aggies went to battle without their captain, Right Halfback Wolff, who was also the best kicker on the team. Despite the loss of their star, the game was closely fought, with the game seemingly headed for a 6–6 tie.

With three minutes remaining to play, OAC had the ball on the Multnomah 35-yard line, but the defense stiffened, resulting in a potential game-winning field goal by Walter Keck. The try was short and wide and Multnomah took over. OACs defense held and a resulting punt was shanked, netting Multnomah only 15 yards. Another attempt was immediately made by Keck, this time successful, and OAC took a 10–6 lead. Following the four point field goal Multnomah kicked off to the Aggies but after just one play OAC elected to play a field position game by punting. Multnomah's diminutive Quarterback received the kick on the OAC 52-yard line and broke a long return for the winning five-point touchdown, with the Portland squad emerging victorious by a score of 11–10.

== Roster ==
The 1908 OAC varsity team

• Left end: Renton Brodie
• Left tackle: Frank R. Pendegrass
• Left guard: Evendon
• Center: Elton Kelley
• Right guard: E.W. Wallace
• Right tackle: W.H. Jamieson
• Right end: James D. Dobbin

• Quarterback: Walter C. Gagnon
• Left Halfback: Roy Cooper
• Right Halfback: Carl Wolff (captain)
• Fullback: Walter Keck

Reserves:
• Linemen: Francis, Loosely, Parker, Smith.
• Ends: Ralph Cady, Emberg.
• Backs: Freeman, George Hastings, Huberg, Roy Knapp.
