= 1923 Whitman Fighting Missionaries football team =

American college football season

1923 Whitman Fighting Missionaries football
- Conference: Northwest Conference
- Record: 1–5 (1–3 Northwest)
- Head coach: Vincent Borleske (8th season)
- Home stadium: Ankeny Field

1923 Northwest Conference football standings
	Conf.					Overall
Team	W		L		T	W		L		T
Washington $	6	–	0	–	0	10	–	1	–	1
Idaho	3	–	0	–	1	5	–	2	–	1
Oregon Agricultural	2	–	2	–	1	4	–	5	–	2
Oregon	3	–	3	–	1	3	–	4	–	1
Washington State	2	–	2	–	1	2	–	4	–	1
Pacific (OR)	2	–	3	–	0	5	–	3	–	0
Whitman	1	–	3	–	0	1	–	5	–	0
Montana	1	–	4	–	0	4	–	4	–	0
Willamette	0	–	3	–	0	2	–	5	–	1
$ – Conference champion

The 1923 Whitman Fighting Missionaries football team represented Whitman College as a member of the Northwest Conference during the 1923 college football season. Under eighth-year head coach Vincent Borleske, the Fighting Missionaries compiled an overall record of 1–5 with a mark of 1–3 in conference play, and finished seventh in the Northwest Conference.

== Schedule ==
Date	Opponent	Site	Result	Attendance	Source
October 6	Utah*	Ankeny Field; Walla Walla, WA	L 0–16		
October 13	at Washington	University of Washington Stadium; Seattle, WA	L 0–19	6,162	
October 19	vs. Oregon	Round-Up Park; Pendleton, OR	L 0–21		
November 3	at Montana	Dornblaser Field; Missoula, MT	L 7–16		
November 10	at Willamette	Sweetland Field; Salem, OR	W 10–0	2,500	
November 17	at Gonzaga*	Gonzaga Stadium; Spokane, WA	L 0–53		
*Non-conference game
