= 1908 Washington State football team =

American college football season

1908 Washington State football
- Conference: Northwest Conference
- Record: 4–0–2 (1–0–2 Northwest)
- Head coach: Walter Rheinschild (1st season)
- Captain: Herbert Wexler
- Home stadium: Rogers Field

1908 Northwest Conference football standings
	Conf.					Overall
Team	W		L		T	W		L		T
Washington $	3	–	0	–	1	6	–	0	–	1
Washington State	1	–	0	–	2	4	–	0	–	2
Oregon	1	–	2	–	0	5	–	2	–	0
Oregon Agricultural	1	–	2	–	0	4	–	3	–	1
Whitman	1	–	3	–	0	4	–	5	–	0
Idaho	0	–	2	–	1	2	–	2	–	2
$ – Conference champion

The 1908 Washington State football team was an American football team that represented Washington State College as a member of the Northwest Conference during the 1908 college football season. Led by first-year head coach Walter Rheinschild, the team compiled an overall record of record of 4–0–2 with a mark of 1–0–2 in conference playing, placing second in the Northwest Conference.

== Schedule ==
Date	Opponent	Site	Result	Attendance	Source
October 10	Cheney Normal*	Rogers Field; Pullman, WA	W 73–0		
October 17	Spokane YMCA*	Rogers Field; Pullman, WA	W 33–0		
October 30	Bremerton Navy*	Rogers Field; Pullman, WA	W 44–0		
November 7	at Washington	Denny Field; Seattle, WA (rivalry)	T 6–6	4,000	
November 14	Idaho	Rogers Field; Pullman, WA (rivalry)	T 4–4		
November 26	Whitman	Rogers Field; Pullman, WA	W 4–0		
*Non-conference game
