= 1923 Oregon Agricultural Aggies football team =

American college football season

1923 Oregon Agricultural Aggies football
- Head coach Dick Rutherford
- Conference: Northwest Conference, Pacific Coast Conference
- Record: 4–5–2 (2–2–1 Northwest, 1–3–1 PCC)
- Head coach: Dick Rutherford (4th season)
- Captain: Millard Scott
- Home stadium: Bell Field

1923 Northwest Conference football standings
	Conf.					Overall
Team	W		L		T	W		L		T
Washington $	6	–	0	–	0	10	–	1	–	1
Idaho	3	–	0	–	1	5	–	2	–	1
Oregon Agricultural	2	–	2	–	1	4	–	5	–	2
Oregon	3	–	3	–	1	3	–	4	–	1
Washington State	2	–	2	–	1	2	–	4	–	1
Pacific (OR)	2	–	3	–	0	5	–	3	–	0
Whitman	1	–	3	–	0	1	–	5	–	0
Montana	1	–	4	–	0	4	–	4	–	0
Willamette	0	–	3	–	0	2	–	5	–	1
$ – Conference champion

1923 Pacific Coast Conference football standings
	Conf.					Overall
Team	W		L		T	W		L		T
California $	5	–	0	–	0	9	–	0	–	1
Washington^	4	–	1	–	0	10	–	1	–	1
Stanford	2	–	2	–	0	7	–	2	–	0
USC	2	–	2	–	0	6	–	2	–	0
Idaho	2	–	2	–	1	5	–	2	–	1
Oregon Agricultural	1	–	3	–	1	4	–	5	–	2
Washington State	1	–	3	–	1	2	–	4	–	1
Oregon	0	–	4	–	1	3	–	4	–	1
$ – Conference champion; ^ Selected as Rose Bowl representative

Program for the November 3 homecoming game against the University of Washington. Note official use of the nickname "Beavers" here.

The 1923 Oregon Agricultural Aggies football team represented Oregon Agricultural College (OAC)—now known as Oregon State University—as a member of the Northwest Conference and the Pacific Coast Conference (PCC) during the 1923 college football season. The team was also known by the moniker "Beavers" during this era.

In their fourth and final season under head coach Dick Rutherford, the Aggies compiled an overall record of 4–5–2 were outscored 71 to 55. Oregon Agricultural had a record of 2–2–1 in Northwest Conference play, placing in a three-way tie for third place, and 1–3–1 against PCC opponents, tying for sixth place.

Tackle Millard Scott was the team captain, replacing Percy Locey, who resigned in 1922 to become student body president. The team played its home games on campus, at Bell Field in Corvallis, Oregon.

== Background ==
On December 11, 14 members of the team, accompanied by Coach Rutherford and the team trainer and others, sailed for the Hawaiian islands, where they played games against the University of Hawaii and a Hawaiian All-Star team in Honolulu. The Aggies lost both contests.

In January 1924, Coach Rutherford resigned as the school's football coach and director of athletics, effective at the end of his contract July 1. According to the Corvallis Gazette-Times, it had been "an open secret" that the alumni had been active in opposing Rutherford's retention. In four seasons under Rutherford, the Aggies had an overall record of 13–14–6 (.485) and were 4–10–3 (.324) in conference play.

== Schedule ==
Date	Time	Opponent	Site	Result	Attendance	Source
September 29		Pacific (OR)	Bell Field; Corvallis, OR	W 12–0		
October 6		Multnomah Athletic Club*	Bell Field; Corvallis, OR	T 0–0		
October 13		O.A.C. alumni*	Bell Field; Corvallis, OR	W 13–0		
October 20		at California	California Field; Berkeley, CA	L 0–26		
November 3		Washington	Bell Field; Corvallis, OR	L 0–14	11,000	
November 10	1:00 p.m.	vs. Idaho	Cody Park; Boise, ID	L 0–7	7,000	
November 17		vs. Washington State	Tacoma Stadium; Tacoma, WA	T 3–3		
November 24		at Oregon	Hayward Field; Eugene, OR (rivalry)	W 6–0		
November 29		at Multnomah Athletic Club*	Multnomah Field; Portland, OR	W 12–0		
December 25		at Hawaiian All Stars*	Moiliili Field; Honolulu, Territory of Hawaii	L 9–14	5,000	
January 1		at Hawaii*	Moiliili Field; Honolulu, Territory of Hawaii	L 0–7		
*Non-conference game; All times are in Pacific time

.

== Roster ==
According to the 1925 Beaver yearbook and a special "homecoming" edition of the OAC Daily Barometer, the following were the players on the 1923 Aggies varsity team. Those earning athletic letters marked with †.

- Floyd "Swack" Andres (C)
- Clarence "Liberty" Bell (FB) †
- "Bolly" Boyken (HB) †
- Ben Carpenter (E) †
- "Christy" Christianson (QB)
- I.F. "Lead" Day (G) †
- "Dutch" Dutcher (Line)
- Dick Garber (HB) †
- Luke Gill (HB) †
- Cub Johnson (Line) †
- "Baggy" Kuhn (Line)
- Percy Locey (T) †
- Mose Lyman (G) †
- Ray "Truck" McCart (HB) †
- Bill Moore (E)
- Glenn "Beetty" Olmstead (T) †
- Ray Price (QB) †
- Herb Rich (C) †
- Roy Richert (Line)
- Millard Scott (T) - (Captain) †
- Paul Snyder (E/HB) †
- Fritz Tebb (E) †
- Reg Tousey (Back) †
- "Heinie" Wagner (Line)

OAC Aggie starters for 1923. Backfield (L-R): Luke Gill, Reg Tousey, Dick Garber, Ray Price. Linemen (L-R): Fritz Tebb, Millard Scott, Percy Locey, Mose Lyman, Herb Rich, Lead Day, Paul Snyder.
