= Northwest Conference (1908–1925) =

College athletic conference in the Pacific Northwest of the United States

- Association: NCAA
- Founded: February 8, 1908
- Folded: December 12, 1925
- Replaced by: Pacific Coast Conference; Northwest Conference
- Region: Pacific Northwest

The Northwest Conference, also known as the Northwest Intercollegiate Association, the Northwest Intercollegiate Conference, the Pacific Northwest Conference, and the Pacific Northwest Intercollegiate Conference, was a collegiate athletic conference with member schools located in the Pacific Northwest of the United States.

The conference's member institutions originally included the "Big Six": the large public universities of Washington, Oregon, and Idaho; the Washington State and Oregon State public agricultural colleges, and the private Whitman College. The conference was later expanded to include the University of Montana, Willamette, Pacific, and Gonzaga.

The conference folded in December 1925, giving way to another conference with the same name, the Northwest Conference, which remains in operation.

== History ==
=== Northwest Intercollegiate Conference ===
In January 1908 officials at Whitman College called a conference of seven primary athletics-oriented universities in the region to reform a new intercollegiate athletics association. Each school was represented by two delegates at the Walla Walla conference — one representing the faculty and another representing the student body. The gathering was attended by six colleges — Idaho, Washington, Washington State, Oregon, Oregon Agricultural, and Whitman. A seventh institution, the University of Montana, was apparently invited to the reorganizational meeting but apparently did not attend.

At a two-day conference in Walla Walla, February 7–8, 1908, discussions on a broad range of topics were planned, including the eligibility of those participating in paid summer baseball, the development of a combined football schedule, and establishment of regional meets for track and field and debate. Rules for athletic participation including a one-year residence requirement and four year total of eligibility were also said to be promoted at the meeting by some participants.

The February 1908 conference in Walla Walla generated a binding set of rules for the six member schools for the 1908–09 and 1909–10 academic years. These included a four-year limit on athletic participation and a requirement that students transferring into member schools would not be eligible for athletic participation until they had been in attendance for one college year. The question of semi-professional summer baseball was to be left to the decision by athletic committees of each institution.

Rationalization of the football schedule was particularly desired, with the hope expressed that the newly rejuvenated conference would "either take control of, or in some way influence the arrangement of football schedules so that the northwest championship may be definitely decided each year, instead of leaving the schedule-making to a haphazard choice by individual managers." This aspiration was not to be achieved, however, and irregular scheduling among conference schools remained the norm.

=== Co-membership in the Pacific Coast Conference ===
At a December 3, 1915 meeting in Portland, Oregon, three conference members, Washington, Oregon, and Oregon Agricultural, who had helped form the new Pacific Coast Conference, noted that they would remain members of the Northwest Conference as well, and that the new conference was intended solely to allowing scheduling and set rules for competition with the California schools. An agreement was signed between the two conferences, setting rules for each and agreeing that rules from one conference would not apply to games in the other conference. The dual membership statuses remained in place a decade, even as other member schools also later joined the PCC.

=== Demise and rebirth ===
Oregon Agricultural and Washington were Northwest Conference co-champions in 1925, the final year of competition.

At a meeting on December 12, 1925, in Seattle, the larger member schools (Washington, Washington State, Idaho, Gonzaga, Montana, Oregon, and Oregon Agricultural) formally withdrew from the conference. The smaller member schools (Pacific University, Whitman College, and Willamette University) announced they had reorganized with three others (College of Idaho, Linfield College, and the College of Puget Sound) the night before at a meeting in Tacoma, and were retaining the Northwest Conference name and eligibity requirements. The decision of the larger schools to leave was described in the press as harmonious and for mutual advantage, with the smaller schools no longer being matched against the larger.

== Member institutions ==
Six colleges and universities were invited to a conference on February 7–8, 1908, in Walla Walla, where a new Northwest Conference was established. Four additional schools were added, starting in December 1916.

| Member institution | Date joined | Notes |
|---|---|---|
| University of Idaho | February 1908 | |
| University of Oregon | February 1908 | |
| University of Washington | February 1908 | Withdrew January 1918; readmitted December 1921. |
| Oregon Agricultural College (Oregon State) | February 1908 | |
| Washington Agricultural College (Washington State) | February 1908 | |
| Whitman College | February 1908 | |
| University of Montana | December 1916 | |
| Willamette University | December 1919 | |
| Pacific University | December 1922 | |
| Gonzaga University | December 1923 | |

== Yearly football standings ==
1908 Northwest Conference football standings
| | Conf. | | | | | Overall |
| Team | W | | L | | T | W | | L | | T |
|---|---|---|---|---|---|---|---|---|---|---|
| Washington $ | 3 | – | 0 | – | 1 | 6 | – | 0 | – | 1 |
| Washington State | 1 | – | 0 | – | 2 | 4 | – | 0 | – | 2 |
| Oregon | 1 | – | 2 | – | 0 | 5 | – | 2 | – | 0 |
| Oregon Agricultural | 1 | – | 2 | – | 0 | 4 | – | 3 | – | 1 |
| Whitman | 1 | – | 3 | – | 0 | 4 | – | 5 | – | 0 |
| Idaho | 0 | – | 2 | – | 1 | 2 | – | 2 | – | 2 |
$ – Conference champion

1909 Northwest Conference football standings
| | Conf. | | | | | Overall |
| Team | W | | L | | T | W | | L | | T |
|---|---|---|---|---|---|---|---|---|---|---|
| Washington + | 4 | – | 0 | – | 0 | 7 | – | 0 | – | 0 |
| Washington State + | 2 | – | 0 | – | 0 | 4 | – | 1 | – | 0 |
| Oregon | 2 | – | 1 | – | 0 | 3 | – | 2 | – | 0 |
| Oregon Agricultural | 1 | – | 2 | – | 0 | 4 | – | 2 | – | 1 |
| Whitman | 1 | – | 3 | – | 0 | 4 | – | 3 | – | 1 |
| Idaho | 0 | – | 4 | – | 0 | 3 | – | 4 | – | 0 |
+ – Conference co-champions

1910 Northwest Conference football standings
| | Conf. | | | | | Overall |
| Team | W | | L | | T | W | | L | | T |
|---|---|---|---|---|---|---|---|---|---|---|
| Washington $ | 4 | – | 0 | – | 0 | 6 | – | 0 | – | 0 |
| Oregon | 2 | – | 0 | – | 0 | 4 | – | 1 | – | 0 |
| Oregon Agricultural | 2 | – | 2 | – | 0 | 3 | – | 2 | – | 1 |
| Idaho | 2 | – | 2 | – | 0 | 4 | – | 2 | – | 0 |
| Washington State | 1 | – | 3 | – | 0 | 2 | – | 3 | – | 0 |
| Whitman | 0 | – | 4 | – | 0 | 2 | – | 4 | – | 0 |
$ – Conference champion

1911 Northwest Conference football standings
| | Conf. | | | | | Overall |
| Team | W | | L | | T | W | | L | | T |
|---|---|---|---|---|---|---|---|---|---|---|
| Washington $ | 4 | – | 0 | – | 0 | 7 | – | 0 | – | 0 |
| Oregon Agricultural | 2 | – | 1 | – | 0 | 5 | – | 2 | – | 0 |
| Oregon | 2 | – | 1 | – | 0 | 3 | – | 2 | – | 0 |
| Washington State | 2 | – | 3 | – | 0 | 3 | – | 3 | – | 0 |
| Idaho | 1 | – | 2 | – | 0 | 4 | – | 3 | – | 0 |
| Whitman | 0 | – | 4 | – | 0 | 1 | – | 4 | – | 0 |
$ – Conference champion

1912 Northwest Conference football standings
| | Conf. | | | | | Overall |
| Team | W | | L | | T | W | | L | | T |
|---|---|---|---|---|---|---|---|---|---|---|
| Washington $ | 4 | – | 0 | – | 0 | 6 | – | 0 | – | 0 |
| Idaho | 2 | – | 2 | – | 0 | 2 | – | 2 | – | 0 |
| Whitman | 2 | – | 2 | – | 0 | 2 | – | 2 | – | 0 |
| Oregon | 2 | – | 3 | – | 0 | 3 | – | 4 | – | 0 |
| Washington State | 2 | – | 3 | – | 0 | 2 | – | 3 | – | 0 |
| Oregon Agricultural | 1 | – | 3 | – | 0 | 3 | – | 4 | – | 0 |
$ – Conference champion

1913 Northwest Conference football standings
| | Conf. | | | | | Overall |
| Team | W | | L | | T | W | | L | | T |
|---|---|---|---|---|---|---|---|---|---|---|
| Washington $ | 4 | – | 0 | – | 0 | 7 | – | 0 | – | 0 |
| Oregon Agricultural | 3 | – | 1 | – | 1 | 3 | – | 2 | – | 3 |
| Idaho | 2 | – | 2 | – | 0 | 3 | – | 3 | – | 0 |
| Oregon | 1 | – | 1 | – | 1 | 3 | – | 3 | – | 1 |
| Washington State | 1 | – | 3 | – | 0 | 4 | – | 4 | – | 0 |
| Whitman | 0 | – | 4 | – | 0 | 1 | – | 4 | – | 0 |
$ – Conference champion

1914 Northwest Conference football standings
| | Conf. | | | | | Overall |
| Team | W | | L | | T | W | | L | | T |
|---|---|---|---|---|---|---|---|---|---|---|
| Washington $ | 3 | – | 0 | – | 1 | 6 | – | 0 | – | 1 |
| Oregon Agricultural | 2 | – | 0 | – | 2 | 7 | – | 0 | – | 2 |
| Oregon | 3 | – | 1 | – | 1 | 4 | – | 2 | – | 1 |
| Washington State | 2 | – | 3 | – | 0 | 2 | – | 4 | – | 0 |
| Idaho | 1 | – | 3 | – | 0 | 2 | – | 3 | – | 1 |
| Whitman | 0 | – | 4 | – | 0 | 0 | – | 4 | – | 0 |
$ – Conference champion

1915 Northwest Conference football standings
| | Conf. | | | | | Overall |
| Team | W | | L | | T | W | | L | | T |
|---|---|---|---|---|---|---|---|---|---|---|
| Washington State ^ + | 4 | – | 0 | – | 0 | 7 | – | 0 | – | 0 |
| Washington + | 1 | – | 0 | – | 0 | 7 | – | 0 | – | 0 |
| Oregon | 3 | – | 1 | – | 0 | 7 | – | 2 | – | 0 |
| Oregon Agricultural | 2 | – | 2 | – | 0 | 5 | – | 3 | – | 0 |
| Idaho | 0 | – | 3 | – | 1 | 1 | – | 4 | – | 1 |
| Whitman | 0 | – | 4 | – | 1 | 1 | – | 5 | – | 1 |
+ – Conference co-champions; ^ – Selected as Rose Bowl representative

1916 Northwest Conference football standings
| | Conf. | | | | | Overall |
| Team | W | | L | | T | W | | L | | T |
|---|---|---|---|---|---|---|---|---|---|---|
| Washington + | 2 | – | 0 | – | 1 | 6 | – | 0 | – | 1 |
| Oregon + | 2 | – | 0 | – | 1 | 7 | – | 0 | – | 1 |
| Oregon Agricultural | 3 | – | 2 | – | 0 | 4 | – | 5 | – | 0 |
| Washington State | 2 | – | 2 | – | 0 | 4 | – | 2 | – | 0 |
| Whitman | 1 | – | 3 | – | 0 | 1 | – | 5 | – | 0 |
| Idaho | 0 | – | 3 | – | 0 | 3 | – | 5 | – | 0 |
+ – Conference co-champions

1917 Northwest Conference football standings
| | Conf. | | | | | Overall |
| Team | W | | L | | T | W | | L | | T |
|---|---|---|---|---|---|---|---|---|---|---|
| Washington State $ | 5 | – | 0 | – | 0 | 6 | – | 0 | – | 1 |
| Oregon Agricultural | 2 | – | 1 | – | 1 | 4 | – | 2 | – | 1 |
| Washington | 1 | – | 1 | – | 1 | 1 | – | 2 | – | 1 |
| Oregon | 1 | – | 2 | – | 0 | 3 | – | 3 | – | 0 |
| Idaho | 1 | – | 3 | – | 0 | 2 | – | 3 | – | 0 |
| Whitman | 0 | – | 3 | – | 0 | 1 | – | 4 | – | 0 |
$ – Conference champion

1919 Northwest Conference football standings
| | Conf. | | | | | Overall |
| Team | W | | L | | T | W | | L | | T |
|---|---|---|---|---|---|---|---|---|---|---|
| Washington State | 3 | – | 1 | – | 0 | 5 | – | 2 | – | 0 |
| Oregon | 2 | – | 1 | – | 0 | 5 | – | 2 | – | 0 |
| Oregon Agricultural | 1 | – | 1 | – | 0 | 4 | – | 4 | – | 0 |
| Idaho | 1 | – | 2 | – | 0 | 2 | – | 3 | – | 0 |
| Montana | 0 | – | 2 | – | 1 | 2 | – | 3 | – | 2 |
| Whitman | 0 | – | 0 | – | 1 | 0 | – | 2 | – | 1 |

1920 Northwest Conference football standings
| | Conf. | | | | | Overall |
| Team | W | | L | | T | W | | L | | T |
|---|---|---|---|---|---|---|---|---|---|---|
| Washington State $ | 3 | – | 0 | – | 0 | 5 | – | 1 | – | 0 |
| Oregon | 1 | – | 0 | – | 1 | 3 | – | 2 | – | 1 |
| Whitman | 2 | – | 1 | – | 0 | 3 | – | 2 | – | 0 |
| Idaho | 2 | – | 2 | – | 0 | 4 | – | 2 | – | 0 |
| Oregon Agricultural | 0 | – | 1 | – | 1 | 2 | – | 2 | – | 2 |
| Willamette | 0 | – | 1 | – | 0 | 3 | – | 1 | – | 1 |
| Montana | 0 | – | 3 | – | 0 | 4 | – | 3 | – | 0 |
$ – Conference champion

1921 Northwest Conference football standings
| | Conf. | | | | | Overall |
| Team | W | | L | | T | W | | L | | T |
|---|---|---|---|---|---|---|---|---|---|---|
| Whitman $ | 3 | – | 0 | – | 0 | 4 | – | 2 | – | 0 |
| Washington State | 2 | – | 0 | – | 1 | 4 | – | 2 | – | 1 |
| Oregon | 1 | – | 0 | – | 3 | 5 | – | 1 | – | 3 |
| Oregon Agricultural | 1 | – | 1 | – | 1 | 4 | – | 3 | – | 2 |
| Idaho | 1 | – | 2 | – | 1 | 4 | – | 3 | – | 1 |
| Montana | 0 | – | 2 | – | 0 | 3 | – | 3 | – | 1 |
| Willamette | 0 | – | 3 | – | 0 | 1 | – | 5 | – | 0 |
$ – Conference champion

1922 Northwest Conference football standings
| | Conf. | | | | | Overall |
| Team | W | | L | | T | W | | L | | T |
|---|---|---|---|---|---|---|---|---|---|---|
| Oregon + | 5 | – | 0 | – | 1 | 6 | – | 1 | – | 1 |
| Washington + | 4 | – | 0 | – | 1 | 6 | – | 1 | – | 1 |
| Whitman | 2 | – | 2 | – | 0 | 2 | – | 4 | – | 1 |
| Idaho | 2 | – | 3 | – | 0 | 3 | – | 5 | – | 0 |
| Oregon Agricultural | 1 | – | 2 | – | 0 | 3 | – | 4 | – | 0 |
| Washington State | 1 | – | 3 | – | 0 | 2 | – | 5 | – | 0 |
| Willamette | 0 | – | 2 | – | 0 | 3 | – | 4 | – | 0 |
| Montana | 0 | – | 3 | – | 0 | 3 | – | 4 | – | 0 |
+ – Conference co-champions

1923 Northwest Conference football standings
| | Conf. | | | | | Overall |
| Team | W | | L | | T | W | | L | | T |
|---|---|---|---|---|---|---|---|---|---|---|
| Washington $ | 6 | – | 0 | – | 0 | 10 | – | 1 | – | 1 |
| Idaho | 3 | – | 0 | – | 1 | 5 | – | 2 | – | 1 |
| Oregon Agricultural | 2 | – | 2 | – | 1 | 4 | – | 5 | – | 2 |
| Oregon | 3 | – | 3 | – | 1 | 3 | – | 4 | – | 1 |
| Washington State | 2 | – | 2 | – | 1 | 2 | – | 4 | – | 1 |
| Pacific (OR) | 2 | – | 3 | – | 0 | 5 | – | 3 | – | 0 |
| Whitman | 1 | – | 3 | – | 0 | 1 | – | 5 | – | 0 |
| Montana | 1 | – | 4 | – | 0 | 4 | – | 4 | – | 0 |
| Willamette | 0 | – | 3 | – | 0 | 2 | – | 5 | – | 1 |
$ – Conference champion

1924 Northwest Conference football standings
| | Conf. | | | | | Overall |
| Team | W | | L | | T | W | | L | | T |
|---|---|---|---|---|---|---|---|---|---|---|
| Idaho + | 4 | – | 0 | – | 1 | 5 | – | 2 | – | 1 |
| Gonzaga + | 3 | – | 0 | – | 2 | 5 | – | 0 | – | 2 |
| Washington | 5 | – | 1 | – | 0 | 8 | – | 1 | – | 1 |
| Oregon | 4 | – | 1 | – | 2 | 4 | – | 2 | – | 3 |
| Oregon Agricultural | 2 | – | 3 | – | 0 | 3 | – | 5 | – | 0 |
| Montana | 2 | – | 3 | – | 0 | 4 | – | 4 | – | 0 |
| Pacific (OR) | 1 | – | 3 | – | 0 | 3 | – | 4 | – | 0 |
| Washington State | 1 | – | 4 | – | 2 | 2 | – | 4 | – | 1 |
| Whitman | 1 | – | 5 | – | 0 | 1 | – | 5 | – | 0 |
| Willamette | 0 | – | 3 | – | 1 | 1 | – | 5 | – | 1 |
+ – Conference co-champions

1925 Northwest Conference football standings
| | Conf. | | | | | Overall |
| Team | W | | L | | T | W | | L | | T |
|---|---|---|---|---|---|---|---|---|---|---|
| Oregon Agricultural + | 7 | – | 0 | – | 0 | 7 | – | 2 | – | 0 |
| Washington + | 5 | – | 0 | – | 0 | 10 | – | 1 | – | 1 |
| Gonzaga | 2 | – | 1 | – | 2 | 7 | – | 2 | – | 2 |
| Whitman | 2 | – | 3 | – | 0 | 4 | – | 3 | – | 0 |
| Idaho | 2 | – | 3 | – | 0 | 3 | – | 5 | – | 0 |
| Montana | 1 | – | 3 | – | 1 | 3 | – | 4 | – | 1 |
| Washington State | 1 | – | 3 | – | 1 | 3 | – | 4 | – | 1 |
| Pacific (OR) | 1 | – | 3 | – | 0 | 3 | – | 5 | – | 1 |
| Oregon | 1 | – | 3 | – | 0 | 1 | – | 5 | – | 1 |
| Willamette | 0 | – | 4 | – | 0 | 2 | – | 7 | – | 0 |
+ – Conference co-champions
