= 1917 All-Service football team =

The 1917 All-Service football team consists of American football players of the United States military selected to the all-service football teams chosen by various selectors.

== All-Service players of 1917 ==
=== Ends ===
- John Rasmussen, Nebraska; Camp Grant (WC-1)
- William Jennings Gardner, Carlisle; Camp Custer (WC-1)
- C. A. Coolidge, Harvard; Camp Devens (PPS)
- Fred Heyman, Washington & Jefferson; Sherman (PPS)
- B. C. Cubbage, Penn State; Allentown Ambulance Corps (NYT)
- George B. L. Green, Dartmouth; Newport Naval Reserves (NYT)
- Ellenberger, Cornell; Camp Dix (WC-2)
- Mitchell, Mare Island Marines (WC-2)
- Spike Dennie, Brown; Camp Funston (WC-3)
- Hunt, Coast Naval Res. (WC-3)

=== Tackles ===
- Belford West, Colgate; Camp Dix (College Football Hall of Fame) (WC-1, PPS)
- John Beckett, Oregon; Mare Island Marines (College Football Hall of Fame) (WC-1)
- Albert Benbrook, Michigan; Fort Sheridan (College Football Hall of Fame) (PPS)
- Pike Johnson, Washington & Lee; Allentown Ambulance Corps (NYT)
- Corbeau, Case; League Island Marines(NYT)
- Moriarty, Coast Naval Res. (WC-2)
- Hugh Blacklock, Mich. Ag; Great Lakes (WC-2)
- Robertson, Dartmouth; Dodge (WC-3)
- Zipper Lathrop, Notre Dame; Camp Grant (WC-3)

=== Guards ===
- Clinton Black, Yale; Newport Naval Reserves (WC-1, PPS, NYT)
- Chris Schlachter, Syracuse; Newport Naval Reserves (PPS, NYT)
- Ernest Allmendinger, Michigan; Fort Sheridan (WC-1)
- Allen Thurman, Virginia; Camp Jackson (WC-2)
- Paul Withington, Harvard; Camp Funston (WC-2)
- Snyder, Camp Lewis (WC-3)
- Holder, Camp Lewis (WC-3)

=== Centers ===
- John T. Callahan, Yale; Newport Naval Reserves (WC-1)
- Paul Des Jardien, Chicago; Fort Sheridan (College Football Hall of Fame) (PPS)
- Lud Wray, Penn; League Island Marines(NYT)
- Hommand, Kansas; Camp Funston (WC-2)
- White, Yale; Camp Jackson (WC-3)

=== Quarterbacks ===
- Ockie Anderson, Colgate; Camp Dix (WC-2; PPS)
- Raymond "Razor" Watkins, Colgate; Mineola Aviation (WC-1)
- Charles Thorne "Mike" Murphy, Yale; Allentown Ambulance Corps (NYT)
- Harry Costello, Georgetown; Camp Custer (WC-3)

=== Halfbacks ===
- Charley Barrett, Cornell; Newport Naval Reserves (WC-2, PPS, NYT)
- Eddie Casey, Harvard; Charlestown Navy Yard (College Football Hall of Fame) (WC-1)
- Wayland Minot, Harvard; Camp Devens (WC-1)
- Bernard Gerrish, Dartmouth; Newport Naval Reserves (PPS)
- Johnny Scott, Lafayette; League Island Marines(NYT)
- Fritz Shiverick, Cornell; Camp Grant (WC-2)
- Edmund O'Boyle, Georgetown; Pelham Naval (WC-3)
- Blair, Md.; Upton (WC-3)

=== Fullbacks ===
- Cedric C. Smith, Michigan; Great Lakes (WC-1)
- Eddie Mahan, Harvard; League Island Marines (College Football Hall of Fame) (PPS)
- Earl "Curley" Cramer, Hamline; Allentown Ambulance Corps (NYT)
- Maxfield, Lafayette, Ft. Slocum (WC-2)
- Thayer, Pa.; Meade (WC-3)

=== Key ===
- WC = Collier's Weekly All Service team as selected by Walter Camp
- PPS = Paul Purman's All Service selection
- NYT = All Service eleven of The New York Times.
- 1 – First-team selection
- 2 – Second-team selection
- 3 – Third-team selection

== See also ==
- 1917 College Football All-America Team
