= Fritz Shiverick =

American football player

Francis T. "Fritz" Shiverick

Profile
- Position: Quarterback

Personal information
- Born: c. 1896; Chicago, Illinois, U.S.
- Died: 1936; Chicago, Illinois, U.S.

Career information
- College: Cornell University

Career history
- 1915–1916, 1919: Cornell

Awards and highlights
- National champion (1915); Second-team All-American (1916); Second-team All-Service (1917)

Francis T. "Fritz" Shiverick (c. 1896 – 1936) was an American football quarterback and halfback. He played for Cornell University in 1915, 1916 and 1919, and was selected as a first-team All-American in 1916. He was posthumously inducted into Cornell's Hall of Fame in 1987.

== Biography ==
A native of Chicago, Illinois, Shiverick graduated in 1914 from the University School of Chicago where he had played halfback for three years. Shiverick then enrolled at Cornell, where he played for the school's varsity football team from 1915–1916 and 1919.

=== 1915 season ===
As a sophomore in 1915, Shiverick began the season as a substitute back for the Cornell varsity. He made a name for himself in Cornell's 1915 victory over Percy Haughton's 1915 Harvard team—the first loss suffered by Harvard since 1911. Replacing Charley Barrett, Shiverick came into the game with a 7–0 lead. Backed up to their own goal line, Cornell was forced to punt into a strong wind. Shiverick was called on to punt for Cornell and kicked the ball 86 yards for what proved to be the longest punt of the year in college football. Later in the same game, Shiverick drop-kicked the ball for a field goal from the 40-yard line. Shiverick's teammate Ray Van Orman later described Shiverick's long punt against Harvard as the headiest play he ever saw. Van Orman wrote that Shiverick called a couple of signals and then stalled for time. Shiverick was punting into the open end of the stadium with the wind pouring in. Shiverick tossed grass into the air and noted that, after the wind blew the grass back, it was picked up by "a reverse current that would carry it up the field as though it were flying against the wind." Concluding that the wind was circling through the stadium like a whirlpool, Shiverick delayed the snap from center until he felt a reverse current. He then drove a low, hard kick that was carried by the reverse current over the head of Harvard's safety man, Eddie Mahan.

After the 1915 season, Shiverick was selected for Outing magazine's Football Roll of Honor.

=== 1916 season ===
In 1916, Shiverick returned as Cornell's starting quarterback and led the Big Red to wins over Michigan and Penn. In Cornell's 23-20 win over Michigan, he drop-kicked two field goals, including one from the 45-yard line. After the 1916 season, Shiverick was selected as a first-team All-American by the United Press and sports writer Paul Purman, and a second-team All-American by the International News Service and Michigan Coach Fielding H. Yost. Shiverick was also selected for membership in the Quill and Dagger society and elected captain of the 1917 Cornell football team. The press reported:

"The famous general of the Big Red eleven, who last year beat Harvard with his punting and was the main factor in the defeat this season of Michigan, is to be elected unanimously, it was announced last night. Shiverick is playing his second year on the 'varsity. He is a junior and a member of the Alpha Delta Phi fraternity."

=== World War I ===
Before the 1917 football season began, the United States entered World War I, and he joined the U.S. Army. During the fall of 1917, Shiverick starred for the Camp Grant football team that included Shiverick, Harry Costello Jerry DePrado, Gene Schobinger and Nelson Norgren. In the biggest game of the 1917 football season, a game between college football stars serving in the military held at Chicago's Stagg Field on December 1, 1917, Shiverick was the star, scoring eight of Camp Grant's fourteen points on a touchdown and two extra points.

In 1918, Shiverick served in France as a captain in the Provost Marshal General's department.

=== 1919 season ===
After being discharged from the military at the end of World War I, Shiverick returned to Cornell. In his first game back after the war, Shiverick led Cornell to a 9–0 win over Oberlin College:

"Captain Fritz Shiverick, Cornell quarterback, playing lor the first time since 1917, was the star of the game. He kicked a difficult field goal from the 20-yard line in the first quarter. In the second quarter be broke through on a play off right tackle, shook off all tacklers and ran 67 yards for a touchdown."

He also kicked a field goal that provided all of the scoring in a 3–0 victory over Williams College. In a 20–0 victory over Carnegie Tech, Shiverick scored all of Cornell's points on two touchdowns, including a 45-yard run through a broken field in the third period, and two field goals, including a drop-kick from the 41-yard line. He became known as "a scoring machine," "the strongest punter" in the country and "the greatest individual star since Eddie Mahan." In addition to serving as Cornell's quarterback, Shiverick also served as the punter, drop kicker, kickoff returner and play-caller on both offense and defense.

=== Later years and honors ===
After graduating from Cornell, Shiverick returned to Chicago where he became the co-owner of the Tobey Furniture Company. He died in Chicago in 1936.

Shiverick was posthumously inducted into the Cornell Hall of Fame in 1987.

== See also ==
- 1916 College Football All-America Team
