= 1917 Newport Naval Reserves football team =

American college football season

1917 Newport Naval Reserves football
- Conference: Independent
- Record: 5–2–1
- Head coach: William T. Bull (1st season)

1917 military service football records
	Conf.			Overall
Team	W	L	T	W		L		T
Mare Island Marines		–		8	–	0	–	0
Mineola Aviation Station		–		3	–	0	–	0
Camp Dix		–		2	–	0	–	0
Camp Jackson		–		2	–	0	–	1
Allentown Ambulance Corps		–		5	–	1	–	0
Camp Custer		–		5	–	1	–	0
Camp Gordon		–		5	–	1	–	0
Charlestown Navy Yard		–		3	–	1	–	0
Camp Funston		–		7	–	3	–	0
Camp Lewis		–		5	–	2	–	1
Newport Naval Reserves		–		5	–	2	–	1
Camp Grant		–		3	–	1	–	0
Camp Taylor		–		2	–	1	–	0
Great Lakes Navy		–		4	–	3	–	0
Camp Devens		–		1	–	3	–	2
Camp Meade		–		1	–	2	–	0
League Island Marines		–		1	–	3	–	0
Camp Upton		–		0	–	1	–	0

The 1917 Newport Naval Reserves football team was an American football team that represented the United States Navy's Second District Naval Reserve stationed at the Newport Naval Reserve Training Station in Newport, Rhode Island, during the 1917 fall football season.

The team had more players named to the 1917 All-Service football team than any other service team. Newport's honorees were: center John T. Callahan (Walter Camp, 1st team); guard Clinton Black (Camp, 1st team); guard Chris Schlachter (New York Times and Paul Purman, 1st teams); halfback Charley Barrett (NYT and Purman, 1st teams, Camp 2nd team); halfback Bernard Gerrish (Purman, 1st team); end George B. L. Green (NYT, 1st team).

== Schedule ==
Date	Opponent	Site	Result	Attendance	Source
	Dean Academy		W 42–0		
November 3	vs. Maine Heavy Artillery	Yale Bowl; New Haven, CT	W 39–0	8,000	
November 10	at Brown	Andrews Field; Providence, RI	W 35–0		
November 17	Harvard	St. George's School athletic field; Newport, RI	W 14–0		
November 24	vs. Rutgers	Ebbets Field; Brooklyn, NY	L 0–14		
November 29	vs. Camp Devens	Braves Field; Boston, MA	T 0–0		
December 3	at Charlestown Navy Yard/1st Navy District	Harvard Stadium; Boston, MA	L 0–7	5,000	
December 8	at Charlestown Navy Yard/1st Navy District	Harvard Stadium; Boston, MA	W 7–6	> 12,000	
