= 1917 Camp Grant football team =

American college football season

1917 Camp Grant football
- Conference: Independent
- Record: 2–1
- Head coach: Amos Alonzo Stagg & Fred J. Murphy (1st season)
- Captain: Whiting

1917 military service football records
	Conf.			Overall
Team	W	L	T	W		L		T
Mare Island Marines		–		8	–	0	–	0
Mineola Aviation Station		–		3	–	0	–	0
Camp Dix		–		2	–	0	–	0
Camp Jackson		–		2	–	0	–	1
Allentown Ambulance Corps		–		5	–	1	–	0
Camp Custer		–		5	–	1	–	0
Camp Gordon		–		5	–	1	–	0
Charlestown Navy Yard		–		3	–	1	–	0
Camp Funston		–		7	–	3	–	0
Camp Lewis		–		5	–	2	–	1
Newport Naval Reserves		–		5	–	2	–	1
Camp Grant		–		3	–	1	–	0
Camp Taylor		–		2	–	1	–	0
Great Lakes Navy		–		4	–	3	–	0
Camp Devens		–		1	–	3	–	2
Camp Meade		–		1	–	2	–	0
League Island Marines		–		1	–	3	–	0
Camp Upton		–		0	–	1	–	0

The 1917 Camp Grant football team was an American football team that represented Camp Grant, located near Rockford, Illinois, during the 1917 fall football season. The team lost its game with Great Lakes Navy, but won its game against Camp Custer at Stagg Field in Chicago.

Amos Alonzo Stagg and Fred J. Murphy, the head coaches at Chicago and Northwestern, coached the Camp Grant team in the week leading up to their game with Camp Custer. Fielding H. Yost of Michigan helped coach the Camp Custer team. Stagg and Murphy were assisted by Lewis Omer and Major Gillesby. Ring Lardner attended Camp Grant's game with Camp Custer and wrote a column describing the spectacle.

Three Camp Grant players received recognition on the 1917 All-Service football team selected by Walter Camp for Collier's Weekly: end John Rasmussen, formerly of Nebraska, received first-team honors; halfback Fritz Shiverick, formerly of Cornell, received second-team honors; and tackle Zipper Lathrop, formerly of Notre Dame, received third-team honors from Camp. Other notable players on the Camp Grant team included halfback Nelson Norgren of Chicago and tackle Perry Smith of Harvard.

== Schedule ==
Date	Opponent	Site	Result	Attendance	Source
	Rockford Athletic Club		W 35–0		
November 17	Great Lakes Navy	Kishwaukee Park; Rockford, IL	L 6–9		
December 1	vs. Camp Custer	Stagg Field; Chicago, IL	W 14–13	15,000	
