= 1917 Camp Meade football team =

American college football season

1917 Camp Meade football
- Conference: Independent
- Record: 1–2

1917 military service football records
	Conf.			Overall
Team	W	L	T	W		L		T
Mare Island Marines		–		8	–	0	–	0
Mineola Aviation Station		–		3	–	0	–	0
Camp Dix		–		2	–	0	–	0
Camp Jackson		–		2	–	0	–	1
Allentown Ambulance Corps		–		5	–	1	–	0
Camp Custer		–		5	–	1	–	0
Camp Gordon		–		5	–	1	–	0
Charlestown Navy Yard		–		3	–	1	–	0
Camp Funston		–		7	–	3	–	0
Camp Lewis		–		5	–	2	–	1
Newport Naval Reserves		–		5	–	2	–	1
Camp Grant		–		3	–	1	–	0
Camp Taylor		–		2	–	1	–	0
Great Lakes Navy		–		4	–	3	–	0
Camp Devens		–		1	–	3	–	2
Camp Meade		–		1	–	2	–	0
League Island Marines		–		1	–	3	–	0
Camp Upton		–		0	–	1	–	0

The 1917 Camp Meade football team represented the United States Army's Camp Meade located in Maryland during the 1917 college football season.

Former Carlisle Indians player Gus Welch played at quarterback for Camp Meade. Eddie Thayer, a former Penn star who played in Camp Meade's backfield, was selected by Walter Camp as a third-team player on the 1917 All-Service football team.

Everett "Hook" Mylin, formerly of Franklin and Marshall, was the team captain. He was wounded while fighting in France in 1918.

In 1918, Camp Meade did not field an all-cantonment team. Instead, the camp organized company teams with multiple games played each week.

== Schedule ==
Date	Opponent	Site	Result	Attendance	Source
November 3	at League Island Marines	Shibe Park; Philadelphia, PA	W 9–7		
November 24	vs. Allentown Ambulance Corps	Circus Maximus Field; Reading, PA	L 14–20	8,000	
December 1	vs. Camp Dix	Franklin Field; Philadelphia, PA	L 6–13	5,000	
