= 1917 Camp Upton football team =

American college football season

1917 Camp Upton football
- Conference: Independent
- Record: 0–1
- Head coach: Frank Glick (1st season)

1917 military service football records
	Conf.			Overall
Team	W	L	T	W		L		T
Mare Island Marines		–		8	–	0	–	0
Mineola Aviation Station		–		3	–	0	–	0
Camp Dix		–		2	–	0	–	0
Camp Jackson		–		2	–	0	–	1
Allentown Ambulance Corps		–		5	–	1	–	0
Camp Custer		–		5	–	1	–	0
Camp Gordon		–		5	–	1	–	0
Charlestown Navy Yard		–		3	–	1	–	0
Camp Funston		–		7	–	3	–	0
Camp Lewis		–		5	–	2	–	1
Newport Naval Reserves		–		5	–	2	–	1
Camp Grant		–		3	–	1	–	0
Camp Taylor		–		2	–	1	–	0
Great Lakes Navy		–		4	–	3	–	0
Camp Devens		–		1	–	3	–	2
Camp Meade		–		1	–	2	–	0
League Island Marines		–		1	–	3	–	0
Camp Upton		–		0	–	1	–	0

The 1917 Camp Upton football team represented the United States Army's 77th Division that trained at Camp Upton in Yaphank on Long Island, New York, during the 1917 college football season. Former Princeton halfback Frank Glick was the team's coach.

By October 1917, 30,000 recruits were stationed at Camp Upton, and athletic competition was part of the camp's training regimen. Regimental football teams competed against one another before an all-cantonment team was formed in November 1917.

Former Harvard All-American Robert Treat Paine Storer played for the Camp Upton all-cantonment team.

On November 24, the team lost a close game to Camp Devens (coached by Harvard's Percy Haughton) at the Polo Grounds in New York City.

The 77th Division was deployed to France in 1918. The Lost Battalion, part of the 77th, sustained heavy losses in the Argonne Forest in October 1918.

== Schedule ==
Date	Opponent	Site	Result	Attendance	Source
November 24	Camp Devens	Polo Grounds; New York, New York	L 0–7		
