= 1917 League Island Marines football team =

American college football season

1917 League Island Marines football
- Conference: Independent
- Record: 1–3

1917 military service football records
	Conf.			Overall
Team	W	L	T	W		L		T
Mare Island Marines		–		8	–	0	–	0
Mineola Aviation Station		–		3	–	0	–	0
Camp Dix		–		2	–	0	–	0
Camp Jackson		–		2	–	0	–	1
Allentown Ambulance Corps		–		5	–	1	–	0
Camp Custer		–		5	–	1	–	0
Camp Gordon		–		5	–	1	–	0
Charlestown Navy Yard		–		3	–	1	–	0
Camp Funston		–		7	–	3	–	0
Camp Lewis		–		5	–	2	–	1
Newport Naval Reserves		–		5	–	2	–	1
Camp Grant		–		3	–	1	–	0
Camp Taylor		–		2	–	1	–	0
Great Lakes Navy		–		4	–	3	–	0
Camp Devens		–		1	–	3	–	2
Camp Meade		–		1	–	2	–	0
League Island Marines		–		1	–	3	–	0
Camp Upton		–		0	–	1	–	0

The 1917 League Island Marines football team, sometimes referred to as "Mahan's Marines", represented the United States Marine Corps stationed at the League Island Navy Yard in Philadelphia during the 1917 college football season. Former Harvard star Eddie Mahan, a three-time All-American from 1913 to 1915, led the team.

Four League Island players were named to the 1917 All-Service football team: fullback Eddie Mahan (Paul Purman, first team); halfback Johnny Scott (New York Times, 1st team); tackle Corbeau (NYT, first team); and center Lud Wray (NYT, first team).

== Schedule ==
Date	Opponent	Site	Result	Attendance	Source
October 26	at Allentown Ambulance Corps	Muhlenberg Field; Allentown, PA	L 0–27	6,000	
November 3	Camp Meade	Shibe Park; Philadelphia PA	L 7–9		
November 10	Allentown Ambulance Corps	Franklin Field; Philadelphia, PA	L 0–16		
November 24	vs. Camp Lee/318th Regiment	Washington, DC	W 29–0		
