= Diffin =

Diffin can refer to:

- Charles Willard Diffin, a 20th-century American writer and engineer
- a community in Limestone Township, Michigan
