= 1917 Camp Zachary Taylor football team =

American college football season

1917 Camp Zachary Taylor football
- Conference: Independent
- Record: 2–1
- Head coach: Ward Lambert (1st season)

1917 military service football records
	Conf.			Overall
Team	W	L	T	W		L		T
Mare Island Marines		–		8	–	0	–	0
Mineola Aviation Station		–		3	–	0	–	0
Camp Dix		–		2	–	0	–	0
Camp Jackson		–		2	–	0	–	1
Allentown Ambulance Corps		–		5	–	1	–	0
Camp Custer		–		5	–	1	–	0
Camp Gordon		–		5	–	1	–	0
Charlestown Navy Yard		–		3	–	1	–	0
Camp Funston		–		7	–	3	–	0
Camp Lewis		–		5	–	2	–	1
Newport Naval Reserves		–		5	–	2	–	1
Camp Grant		–		3	–	1	–	0
Camp Taylor		–		2	–	1	–	0
Great Lakes Navy		–		4	–	3	–	0
Camp Devens		–		1	–	3	–	2
Camp Meade		–		1	–	2	–	0
League Island Marines		–		1	–	3	–	0
Camp Upton		–		0	–	1	–	0

The 1917 Camp Zachary Taylor football team represented Camp Zachary Taylor during the 1917 college football season. Doc Rodes was on the team.

== Schedule ==
Date	Opponent	Site	Result
	Camp Sherman		L 7–26
	Georgetown (KY)		W 14–10
	Camp Shelby		W 52–21
