= 1917 Camp Dix football team =

American college football season

1917 Camp Dix football
- Conference: Independent
- Record: 2–0
- Captain: Ockie Anderson

1917 military service football records
	Conf.			Overall
Team	W	L	T	W		L		T
Mare Island Marines		–		8	–	0	–	0
Mineola Aviation Station		–		3	–	0	–	0
Camp Dix		–		2	–	0	–	0
Camp Jackson		–		2	–	0	–	1
Allentown Ambulance Corps		–		5	–	1	–	0
Camp Custer		–		5	–	1	–	0
Camp Gordon		–		5	–	1	–	0
Charlestown Navy Yard		–		3	–	1	–	0
Camp Funston		–		7	–	3	–	0
Camp Lewis		–		5	–	2	–	1
Newport Naval Reserves		–		5	–	2	–	1
Camp Grant		–		3	–	1	–	0
Camp Taylor		–		2	–	1	–	0
Great Lakes Navy		–		4	–	3	–	0
Camp Devens		–		1	–	3	–	2
Camp Meade		–		1	–	2	–	0
League Island Marines		–		1	–	3	–	0
Camp Upton		–		0	–	1	–	0

The 1917 Camp Dix football team represented the United States Army's Camp Dix located near Trenton, New Jersey, during the 1917 college football season. Quarterback Oscar "Ockie" Anderson, formerly of Colgate, was selected on November 22, 1917, as the team's captain.

Three Fort Dix players received honors on the 1917 All-Service football team: tackle Belford West (Walter Camp and Paul Purman, first teams); quarterback Anderson (Purman, first team; Camp, second team); and end Ellenberger (Camp, second team).

Before the formation of an all-cantonment team, various units within Fort Dix had also competed in football. For example, a team representing the 307th Field Artillery at Camp Dix played a game against Princeton on October 27. Princeton won by a 7–0 score. Teams representing individual regiments also competed in well-attended games.

The all-cantonment football team was organized in October with selection of players made through a "round robin elimination series" among 16 teams formed from the camp's athletes.

== Schedule ==
Date	Opponent	Site	Result	Attendance	Source
November 17	at Camp Devens	Braves Field; Boston, MA	W 19–0		
December 1	vs. Camp Meade	Franklin Field; Philadelphia, PA	W 13–6	5,000	
