= 1917 Charlestown Navy Yard football team =

American college football season

1917 Charlestown Navy Yard football
- Conference: Independent
- Record: 3–1
- Head coach: Leo Leary (1st season)

1917 military service football records
	Conf.			Overall
Team	W	L	T	W		L		T
Mare Island Marines		–		8	–	0	–	0
Mineola Aviation Station		–		3	–	0	–	0
Camp Dix		–		2	–	0	–	0
Camp Jackson		–		2	–	0	–	1
Allentown Ambulance Corps		–		5	–	1	–	0
Camp Custer		–		5	–	1	–	0
Camp Gordon		–		5	–	1	–	0
Charlestown Navy Yard		–		3	–	1	–	0
Camp Funston		–		7	–	3	–	0
Camp Lewis		–		5	–	2	–	1
Newport Naval Reserves		–		5	–	2	–	1
Camp Grant		–		3	–	1	–	0
Camp Taylor		–		2	–	1	–	0
Great Lakes Navy		–		4	–	3	–	0
Camp Devens		–		1	–	3	–	2
Camp Meade		–		1	–	2	–	0
League Island Marines		–		1	–	3	–	0
Camp Upton		–		0	–	1	–	0

The 1917 Charlestown Navy Yard football team was an American football team that represented the United States Navy's Charlestown Navy Yard, also known as Boston Navy Yard, during the 1917 football season.

Halfback Eddie Casey was selected as a first-team halfback on Walter Camp's 1917 All-Service football team.

== Schedule ==
Date	Opponent	Site	Result	Attendance	Source
November 3	Camp Devens	Harvard Stadium; Boston, MA	W 28–0	20,000	
November 24	Dan Sullivan's All-College Stars	Beverly High School; Beverly, MA	W 34–0	5,000	
December 3	Newport Naval	Harvard Stadium; Boston, MA	W 7–0	5,000	
December 8	Newport Naval	Harvard Stadium; Boston, MA	L 6–7	> 12,000	
