= Eddie Mahan =

American football player (1892–1975)

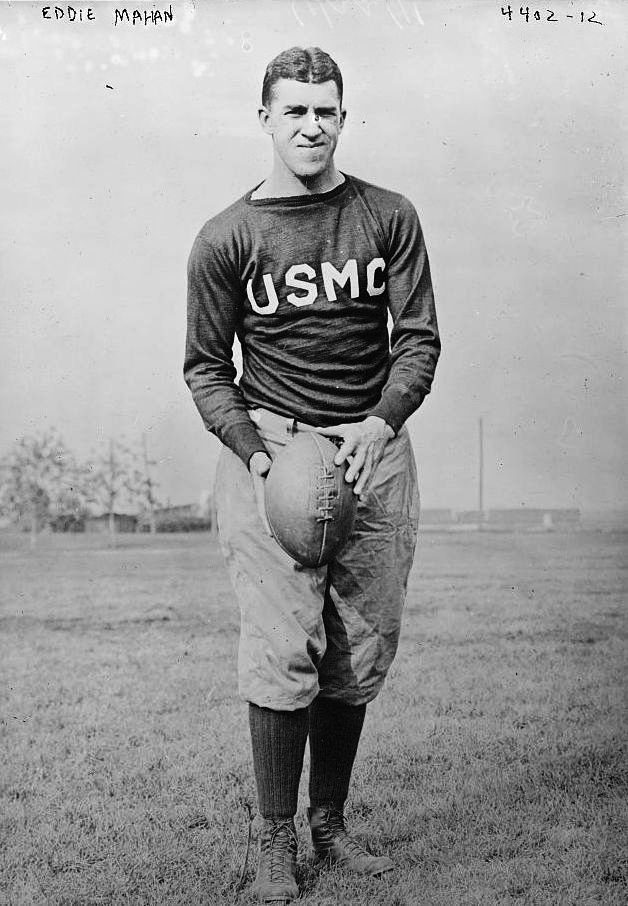

Profile
- Position: Halfback

Personal information
- Born: January 19, 1892; Natick, Massachusetts, U.S.
- Died: July 22, 1975 (aged 83); Natick, Massachusetts, U.S.
- Listed height: 5 ft 11 in (1.80 m)
- Listed weight: 171 lb (78 kg)

Career information
- College: Harvard (1913–1915); League Island Marines (1917)

Awards and highlights
- National champion (1913); 3× Consensus All-American (1913, 1914, 1915); First-team All-Service (1917); Thorpe All-time All-America team
- College Football Hall of Fame

Edward William Mahan (January 19, 1892 – July 22, 1975) was an American football player. While playing halfback for Harvard, Mahan was selected as a first-team All-American three consecutive years from 1913 to 1915. He was widely regarded as one of the greatest football players in the first 50 years of the sport and was named by Jim Thorpe as the greatest football player of all time. In 1951, he was elected to the College Football Hall of Fame as part of the first group of inductees.

== Early life ==
Mahan was a native of Natick, Massachusetts. He was of Irish ancestry and reportedly spoke with "the brogue of a full-blooded native of Erin." Mahan first gained attention for his football skills while playing at Andover. Mahan later recalled his days at Andover, "Well do I recall those wonderful days at Andover and the games between Andover and Exeter. There is intense rivalry between these two schools. Many are the traditions at Andover."

== All-American football player ==
Mahan enrolled at Harvard in 1912 and played halfback for Harvard's varsity football team. Although he weighed only 165 pounds, Mahan played every minute of every football game for Harvard from 1913 to 1915. Mahan was selected as a first-team All-American in each of those years, leading Harvard to a three-year record of 24–1–2.

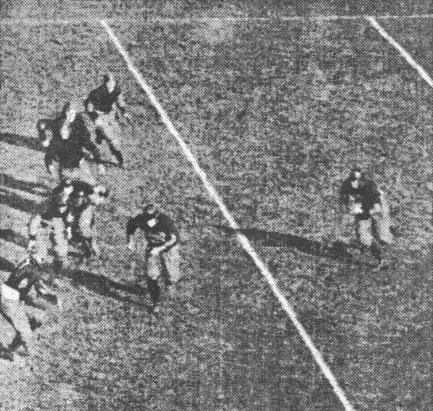
Mahan carries against Princeton, 1915

Mahan played his first varsity game for Harvard in 1913 against Maine and scored two touchdowns, including a 67-yard run. And in the 1915 Harvard–Princeton game, he threw a pass for a 61-yard gain on a fake punt.

As a senior and team captain in 1915, Mahan climaxed his college football career by scoring four touchdowns and kicking five extra points in a 41–0 win over Yale, the worst defeat in Yale's 44 years of college football to that time. In the biography of Mahan at the College Football Hall of Fame, it is said that Mahan electrified the crowd in the 1915 Harvard-Yale game with "one of the greatest individual performances of the game's Pioneer Era."

Harvard's sole loss during Mahan's three years on the team was a 10–0 loss to Cornell in 1915. After the game, Mahan apologized to Harvard coach Percy Haughton. Haughton reportedly responded, "Mahan, you are the greatest football player God ever made."

Mahan later described his technique for evading tacklers as follows: "I simply give them the foot—right or left—and then take it away."

=== Recognition as one of the greatest football players of all time ===
When Jim Thorpe was asked to choose the greatest football player of all time, he selected Mahan. He explained his choice as follows:

"Eddie Mahan of Harvard was the greatest football player I have ever seen. He had everything, he could run, pass and kick. He was big, weighed 190 pounds, was smart enough to play quarterback and also good enough to play in the line. To me that's proof enough that Mahan was the tops. He was a specialist in all lines."

In his book about the early days of football, Bill Edwards wrote the following about Mahan: "If the future football generals develop a better all-around man than Eddie Mahan, captain of the great Harvard team of 1915, whose playing brought not only victory to Harvard but was accompanied by great admiration throughout the football world, they may well congratulate themselves."

In November 1925, football writer W.B. Hanna compared Red Grange to Mahan:

"In the writer's opinion, Grange and Mahan are the greatest backs he ever saw, from the standpoint of advancing the ball. Grange seems to run with more power than Mahan and a trifle more laboriously, because he is not quite so light-footed. It may be doubted whether he is as fast, but that is mere guesswork. Football, carrying the ball, seemed play to Mahan. Grange does not do his work in quite that effortless manner."

Mahan was frequently mentioned among the greats of the game. In 1927, George Trevor of the New York Sun selected an all-time backfield made up of Mahan, Walter Eckersall, Jim Thorpe, and Willie Heston of Michigan. In 1928, Grantland Rice named Mahan to his all-time team and wrote, "Mahan lacked the crashing force of a Heston or a Coy, but he was one of the smoothest running backs anyone ever saw." Western football expert Walter Eckersall added, "Mahan is awarded the honor of being Harvard's greatest football player, a terror to the opposition offensively and defensively. As a line plunger he ranks with the greatest in history."

In 1951, Mahan was inducted into the College Football Hall of Fame as part of the first group of inductees.

== Baseball player ==
Mahan also played for Harvard's varsity baseball team for three years. In an exhibition game in the spring of 1916, Mahan pitched a shutout against the Boston Red Sox, the year after the Red Sox team featuring Babe Ruth and Tris Speaker won the 1915 World Series. Mahan was offered a contract by several major league clubs, but none was willing to meet his demand for a salary of $6,500. Mahan described his negotiations in an interview with the Oakland Tribune:

"I had a chance first to go with the Boston Red Sox when I was in my senior year at Harvard. They said to name my price and I named $6,500. They thought it was too much. Then the Detroit club made an offer to me but they too thought I had a gold-brick scheme. The Chicago White Sox were willing to give me a good contract with a bonus if I made good, but the risk was not worth the undertaking. I considered the Braves more seriously than any other team but my negotiations there too were not satisfactory ..."

== Coaching and military service ==
Mahan received a Bachelor of Arts degree from Harvard in the spring of 1916, with a major in political science and economy. He played semi-professional baseball in New Haven during the summer of 1916 and also worked as the head of the Woodrow Wilson clubs in New York state.

In August 1916, Mahan accepted a position as assistant football coach at the University of California. After one season at Berkeley, Mahan returned to the East. Press accounts at the end of the 1916 season reported that Mahan and Cal's head coach (an alumnus of the University of Pennsylvania) had vastly different styles of coaching, and Mahan was never given an opportunity to play an active role in coaching the team.

During World War I, Mahan served as a first lieutenant with the U.S. Marine Corps and was captain of the League Island Marines football team. He was named to Paul Purman's 1917 All-Service football team. At the end of the war, Mahan remained in Europe for a time working for Herbert Hoover's Food Administration. In a January 1919 game played in France, Mahan led a Navy football team to a 12–0 win over a U.S. Army team. A press account reported that Mahan was the star of the game, running 65 yards for the first touchdown:

"In spite of the muddy field, speed and generalship on the part of the S.O.S. eleven, largely in the person of Eddie Mahan, … told the tale. It was the tall, black-haired Mahan with an undershot jaw that broke the deadlock in the second period. He grabbed a short punt …, eluded two men who barred his path, shook off a third tackler further down the field, and sprinted 65 yards for a touchdown."

After the war, Mahan returned to Harvard as the coach of the team's halfbacks. In August 1924, he was also appointed head coach of the Harvard baseball team.

== Later life ==
In 1926, Mahan went to Choate School in Wallingford, Connecticut. He also served as director of athletics at the Newman School in Lakewood, New Jersey.

After retiring from athletics, Mahan worked in the investment banking field and later worked for the Massachusetts Department of Natural Resources. He made his debut in investment banking in August 1927, accepting a position with the Wall Street firm Hornblower & Weeks. He also served as a lieutenant commander in the U.S. Navy during World War II.

In 1975, after a long illness, Mahan died of cancer at Glover Memorial Hospital in Needham, Massachusetts. At the time of his death, Mahan was a resident of his hometown, Natick, Massachusetts. He was survived by his wife, Beryl Boardman Mahan, two daughters, and six grandchildren.
