= 1917 Mineola Aviation Station football team =

American college football season

1917 Mineola Aviation Station football
- Conference: Independent
- Record: 3–0

1917 military service football records
	Conf.			Overall
Team	W	L	T	W		L		T
Mare Island Marines		–		8	–	0	–	0
Mineola Aviation Station		–		3	–	0	–	0
Camp Dix		–		2	–	0	–	0
Camp Jackson		–		2	–	0	–	1
Allentown Ambulance Corps		–		5	–	1	–	0
Camp Custer		–		5	–	1	–	0
Camp Gordon		–		5	–	1	–	0
Charlestown Navy Yard		–		3	–	1	–	0
Camp Funston		–		7	–	3	–	0
Camp Lewis		–		5	–	2	–	1
Newport Naval Reserves		–		5	–	2	–	1
Camp Grant		–		3	–	1	–	0
Camp Taylor		–		2	–	1	–	0
Great Lakes Navy		–		4	–	3	–	0
Camp Devens		–		1	–	3	–	2
Camp Meade		–		1	–	2	–	0
League Island Marines		–		1	–	3	–	0
Camp Upton		–		0	–	1	–	0

The 1917 Mineola Aviation Station football team represented the United States Army aviators stationed at Mineola Aviation Station on Long Island during the 1917 college football season.

Raymond "Razor" Watkins, formerly of Colgate, played quarterback for Mineola and was selected by Walter Camp as the first-team quarterback on the 1917 All-Service football team.

== Schedule ==
Date	Opponent	Site	Result	Attendance	Source
November 6	Fort Totten	Travers Island, NY	W 9–7		
November 29	vs. Pelham Bay Naval Reserves	Polo Grounds; New York, NY	W 14–7		
December 8	Fort Slocum	St. Paul's School field; Garden City, NY	W 13–0		
