= 1921 Lehigh Brown and White football team =

American college football season

1921 Lehigh Brown and White football
- Conference: Independent
- Record: 4–4
- Head coach: Frank Glick (1st season)
- Home stadium: Taylor Stadium

1921 Eastern college football independents records
	Conf.			Overall
Team	W	L	T	W		L		T
Washington & Jefferson		–		10	–	0	–	1
Lafayette		–		9	–	0	–	0
Cornell		–		8	–	0	–	0
Penn State		–		8	–	0	–	2
Yale		–		8	–	1	–	0
New Hampshire		–		8	–	1	–	1
Franklin & Marshall		–		6	–	1	–	2
Villanova		–		6	–	1	–	2
Carnegie Tech		–		7	–	2	–	0
Syracuse		–		7	–	2	–	0
Harvard		–		7	–	2	–	1
Boston University		–		6	–	2	–	0
Dartmouth		–		6	–	2	–	1
Brown		–		5	–	3	–	1
Bucknell		–		5	–	3	–	1
Geneva		–		5	–	3	–	1
Pittsburgh		–		5	–	3	–	1
Holy Cross		–		5	–	3	–	0
Army		–		6	–	4	–	0
Princeton		–		4	–	3	–	0
Boston College		–		4	–	3	–	1
Fordham		–		4	–	3	–	2
Penn		–		4	–	3	–	2
Colgate		–		4	–	4	–	2
Lehigh		–		4	–	4	–	0
Springfield		–		4	–	5	–	2
Vermont		–		3	–	4	–	0
NYU		–		2	–	3	–	3
Buffalo		–		2	–	3	–	2
Drexel		–		2	–	3	–	1
Rutgers		–		4	–	6	–	0
Rhode Island State		–		3	–	5	–	0
Columbia		–		2	–	6	–	0
Tufts		–		1	–	5	–	2
Duquesne		–		0	–	4	–	1

The 1921 Lehigh Brown and White football team was an American football team that represented Lehigh University as an independent during the 1921 college football season. In its first and only season under head coach Frank Glick, the team compiled a 4–4 record and outscored opponents by a total of 138 to 105. Lehigh played home games at Taylor Stadium in Bethlehem, Pennsylvania.

== Schedule ==
Date	Opponent	Site	Result	Attendance	Source
October 1	Susquehanna	Taylor Stadium; Bethlehem, PA	W 22–0		
October 8	at Rutgers	Neilson Field; New Brunswick, NJ	W 7–0		
October 15	at Penn State	New Beaver Field; State College, PA	L 7–28	4,000	
October 22	Washington & Jefferson	Taylor Stadium; Bethlehem, PA	L 7–14	5,000	
October 29	West Virginia	Taylor Stadium; Bethlehem, PA	W 21–14		
November 5	at Muhlenberg	Allentown, PA	L 13–14		
November 12	Lebanon Valley	Taylor Stadium; Bethlehem, PA	W 55–7		
November 19	Lafayette	Taylor Stadium; Bethlehem, PA (rivalry)	L 6–28	17,000	
