= 1917 Allentown Ambulance Corps football team =

American college football season

1917 Allentown Ambulance Corps football
- Conference: Independent
- Record: 5–1
- Head coach: Dudley Clark (1st season)

1917 military service football records
	Conf.			Overall
Team	W	L	T	W		L		T
Mare Island Marines		–		8	–	0	–	0
Mineola Aviation Station		–		3	–	0	–	0
Camp Dix		–		2	–	0	–	0
Camp Jackson		–		2	–	0	–	1
Allentown Ambulance Corps		–		5	–	1	–	0
Camp Custer		–		5	–	1	–	0
Camp Gordon		–		5	–	1	–	0
Charlestown Navy Yard		–		3	–	1	–	0
Camp Funston		–		7	–	3	–	0
Camp Lewis		–		5	–	2	–	1
Newport Naval Reserves		–		5	–	2	–	1
Camp Grant		–		3	–	1	–	0
Camp Taylor		–		2	–	1	–	0
Great Lakes Navy		–		4	–	3	–	0
Camp Devens		–		1	–	3	–	2
Camp Meade		–		1	–	2	–	0
League Island Marines		–		1	–	3	–	0
Camp Upton		–		0	–	1	–	0

The 1917 Allentown Ambulance Corps football team, also known as the "Usaccs", represented the United States Army Ambulance Service stationed at Camp Crane in Allentown, Pennsylvania, during the 1917 college football season. Dudley Clark, formerly a football player at Oregon, was the team's coach.

The team was invited to appear in the 1918 Rose Bowl but did not receive authorization for travel to the West Coast. Allentown's declination opened the door for Camp Lewis, which lost to the Mare Island Marines on New Year's Day.

== Schedule ==
Date	Opponent	Site	Result	Attendance	Source
October 13	Gettysburg/Seventh Infantry	Harrisburg, PA	W 46–0	7,000	
October 27	League Island Marines	Muhlenberg Field; Allentown, PA	W 27–0	6,000	
November 3	Ewing Athletic Club	Muhlenberg Field; Allentown, PA	W 40–0		
November 10	at League Island Marines	Franklin Field; Philadelphia, PA	W 16–0		
November 24	Camp Meade	Circus Maximus Field; Reading, PA	W 20–14	8,000	
November 29	at Georgetown	American League Park; Washington, DC	L 0–27		
