= Chris Schlachter =

American football player

Profile
- Position: Guard

Personal information
- Born: July 17, 1894; Brooklyn, New York, U.S.
- Died: Unknown

Career information
- College: Syracuse

Awards and highlights
- First-team All-American (1915); First-team All-Service (1917)

Christopher Peter Schlachter (July 17, 1894 – date and year of death unclear) was an American football player.

Schlachter was born in Brooklyn in 1894. He attended Bushwick High School.

He next attended Syracuse University, where he played at the guard position for the Syracuse Orange football team from 1915 to 1916. He was selected by Walter Camp as a first-team guard on this 1915 College Football All-America Team. In October 1916, he sustained a broken collar bone and missed the remainder of the 1916 season. Another report indicated that Schlachter quit the team in October 1916.

In June 1917, he applied to serve in ambulance unit, but he was rejected because of his German name. He was later certified to serve in the Army but was left behind when his unit was deployed to Europe, due to his parent having been born in Germany. In May 1918, he was inducted into the United States Navy and assigned to the United States Naval Academy, attaining the rank of lieutenant in 1919. In 1917, while playing for the Newport Naval Reserve team, he was selected for the All Service teams selected by Paul Purman and The New York Times.
