= 1917 Mare Island Marines football team =

American college football season

1917 Mare Island Marines football

Rose Bowl, W 19–7 vs. Camp Lewis
- Conference: Independent
- Record: 8–0
- Head coach: Hugo Bezdek (1st season)

1917 military service football records
	Conf.			Overall
Team	W	L	T	W		L		T
Mare Island Marines		–		8	–	0	–	0
Mineola Aviation Station		–		3	–	0	–	0
Camp Dix		–		2	–	0	–	0
Camp Jackson		–		2	–	0	–	1
Allentown Ambulance Corps		–		5	–	1	–	0
Camp Custer		–		5	–	1	–	0
Camp Gordon		–		5	–	1	–	0
Charlestown Navy Yard		–		3	–	1	–	0
Camp Funston		–		7	–	3	–	0
Camp Lewis		–		5	–	2	–	1
Newport Naval Reserves		–		5	–	2	–	1
Camp Grant		–		3	–	1	–	0
Camp Taylor		–		2	–	1	–	0
Great Lakes Navy		–		4	–	3	–	0
Camp Devens		–		1	–	3	–	2
Camp Meade		–		1	–	2	–	0
League Island Marines		–		1	–	3	–	0
Camp Upton		–		0	–	1	–	0

The 1917 Mare Island Marines football team represented the United States Marine Corps stationed at the Mare Island Naval Shipyard in Vallejo, California, during the 1917 college football season. The team compiled an 8–0 record, won the 1918 Rose Bowl, shut out six opponents, and outscored all opponents by a combined total of 200 to 10.

== Schedule ==
Date	Opponent	Site	Result	Attendance	Source
September 15	at California	California Field; Berkeley, CA	W 27–0		
September 29	at California	California Field; Berkeley, CA	W 26–0		
October 14	Olympic Club	Vallejo, CA	W 27–3		
October 21	Saint Mary's	Ewing Field; San Francisco, CA	W 27–0		
November 3	Oregon	Multnomah Field; Portland, OR	W 27–0		
November 10	at Camp Lewis	Tacoma Stadium; Tacoma, WA	W 13–0	25,000	
November 24	at USC	Washington Park; Los Angeles, CA	W 34–0	3,000	
January 1, 1918	vs. Camp Lewis	Tournament Park; Pasadena, CA (Rose Bowl)	W 19–7	25,000	
