= Paul Withington =

American football player and coach (1888–1966)

Biographical details
- Born: January 25, 1888; Escondido, California, U.S.
- Died: April 2, 1966 (aged 78); Honolulu, Hawaii, U.S.

Playing career
- 1908–1909: Harvard
- Positions: Guard, center

Coaching career (HC unless noted)
- 1910–1914: Yale (line)
- 1915: Harvard (assistant)
- 1916: Wisconsin
- 1917: Camp Funston
- 1923–1924: Columbia (assistant)
- 1924: Columbia

Head coaching record
- Overall: 12–7–2

Accomplishments and honors

Awards
- Second-team All-American (1909); Second-team All-Service (1917)

Paul Withington (January 25, 1888 – April 2, 1966) was an American football player and coach. He was the head coach at the University of Wisconsin–Madison for a season in 1916 and at Columbia University for part of one season in 1924.

In 1905, Withington graduated from the Punahou School in Honolulu. He then attended Harvard University, where he played football as a guard and center. He received his Bachelor of Arts degree from Harvard in 1909, and his Doctor of Medicine degree from Harvard Medical School in 1914. Withington is notable as the only coach in collegiate history to be a head coach at the same time as working as a doctor. In 1914, he also published the book "The Book of Athletics".

Withington married Constance Restarick in Boston, Massachusetts, on April 18, 1911.

Prior to the U.S. entering World War 1, he was a member of the Harvard Surgical Unit supporting the British Army in Europe.

General Pershing awards a silver star to Dr. Withington

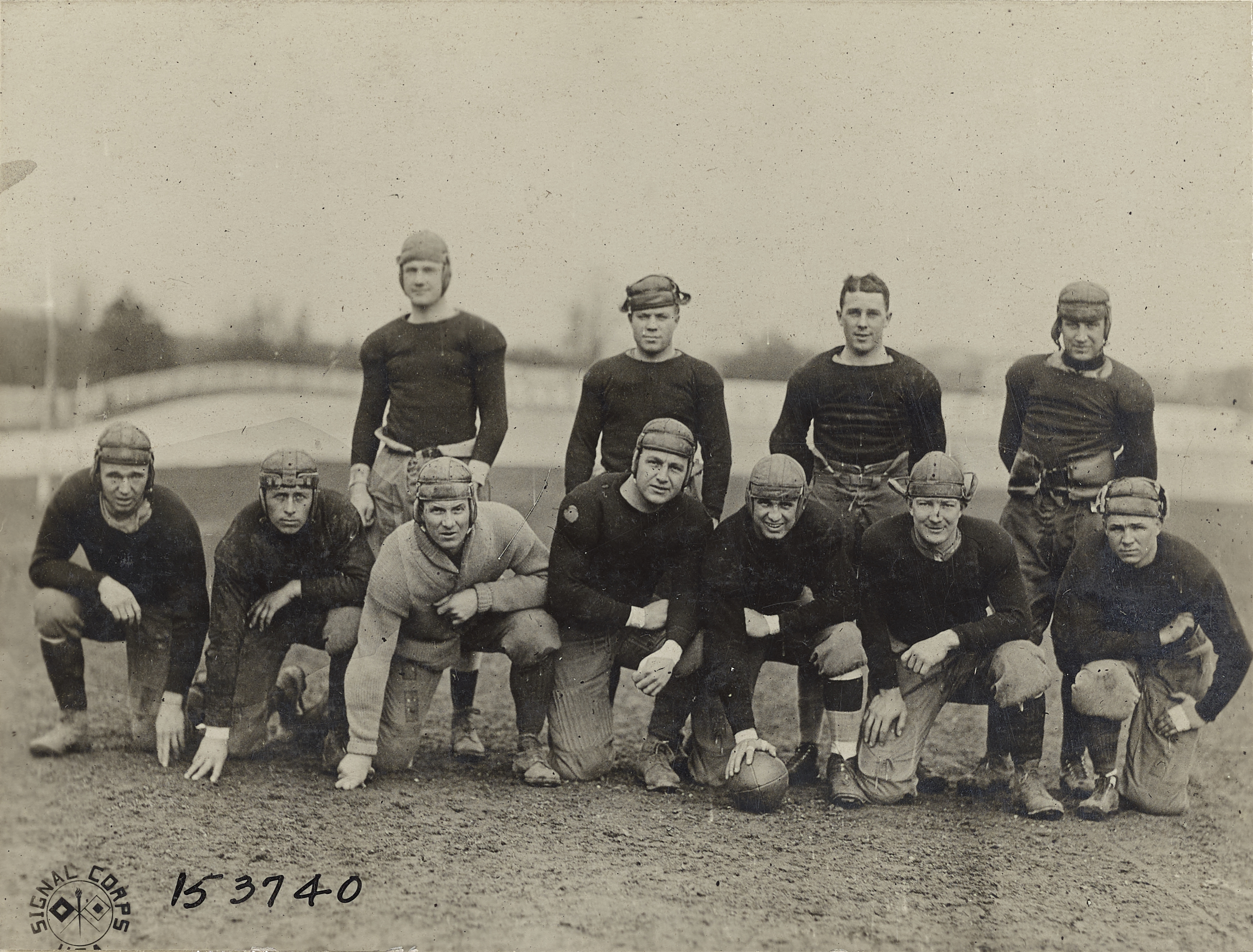
89th Division team, Withington in lighter color jersey at front

In 1917, he entered the U.S. Army Medical Corps. Major General Leonard Wood placed him in charge of athletics at Camp Funston, where he coached and played on the football team. After the war, Withington remained in Germany with the 89th Division and the Army of Occupation. Football teams were established and a championship playoff system established. Withington was the team captain for the 89th Division, which won the A.E.F. championship in March 1919.

Between World Wars, he transferred from the Army to the United States Navy Reserve. During World War 2, he was a member of the Navy's Medical Corps in Hawaii where he was responsible for managing the Navy's Hawaiian medical facilities. He traveled extensively with Chester W. Nimitz as his personal doctor.

Withington was awarded the Legion of Merit by the U.S. Navy in 1945, the Silver Star by the U.S. Army in 1919, the French Croix de Guerre, the British Mons Star, World War I victory ribbon, the Army of Occupation of Germany ribbon, the American Defense ribbon and the Pacific Asiatic ribbon with star. He was also an honorary lieutenant in the Royal Medical Corps of the British Army.

In later life, Withington served as physician for his alma mater, the Punahou School. After his death in 1966, he was interred at the National Memorial Cemetery of the Pacific.

== Head coaching record ==
Year	Team	Overall	Conference	Standing	Bowl/playoffs
Wisconsin Badgers (Western Conference) (1916)
1916	Wisconsin	4–2–1	1–2–1	6th	
Wisconsin:		4–2–1	1–2–1		
Camp Funston (Independent) (1917)
1917	Camp Funston	7–3			
Camp Funston:		7–3			
Columbia Lions (Independent) (1924)
1924	Columbia	1–2–1*			
Columbia:		1–2–1		*Percy Haughton coached the first 5 games of the season.	
Total:		12–7–2			
