= Hugo Bezdek =

Czech-American athlete and coach (1884–1952)

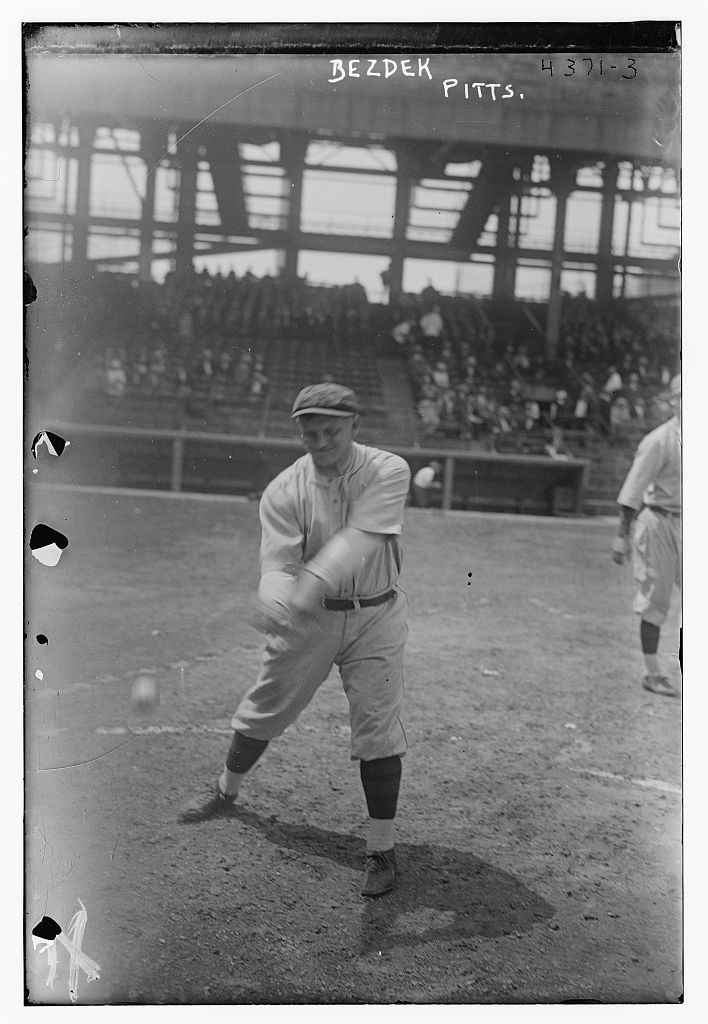

Biographical details
- Born: April 1, 1884; Prague, Bohemia, Austria-Hungary
- Died: September 19, 1952 (aged 68); Atlantic City, New Jersey, U.S.

Playing career

Football
- 1904–1905: Chicago
- Position: Fullback

Coaching career (HC unless noted)

Football
- 1906: Oregon
- 1907: Chicago (assistant)
- 1908–1912: Arkansas
- 1913–1916: Oregon
- 1918–1929: Penn State
- 1937–1938: Cleveland Rams
- 1949: Delaware Valley

Basketball
- 1906–1907: Oregon
- 1913–1917: Oregon
- 1919: Penn State (interim HC)

Baseball
- 1908–1913: Arkansas
- 1914–1917: Oregon
- 1917–1919: Pittsburgh Pirates
- 1920–1930: Penn State

Administrative career (AD unless noted)
- 1918–1936: Penn State

Head coaching record
- Overall: 126–58–16 (college football); 1–13 (NFL); 28–37 (college basketball); 166–187 (MLB); 222–123–1 (college baseball)
- Bowls: 2–1

Accomplishments and honors

Championships
- National (1905)

Awards
- Third-team All-American (1905); First-team All-Western (1905)
- College Football Hall of Fame; Inducted in 1954 (profile)

Hugo Francis Bezdek (April 1, 1884 – September 19, 1952) was a Czech American athlete who played American football and was a coach of football, basketball, and baseball. He was the head football coach at the University of Oregon (1906, 1913–1917), the University of Arkansas (1908–1912), Pennsylvania State University (1918–1929), and Delaware Valley College (1949). Bezdek also coached the Mare Island Marines in the 1918 Rose Bowl and the Cleveland Rams of the National Football League (NFL) in 1937 and part of the 1938 season. In addition, Bezdek coached basketball at Oregon (1906–1907, 1913–1917) and Penn State (1919), coached baseball at Arkansas (1909–1913), Oregon (1914–1917) and Penn State (1920–1930), and served as the manager of Major League Baseball's Pittsburgh Pirates (1917–1919). He was inducted into the College Football Hall of Fame as a coach in 1954.

Bezdek is the only coach to bring three different teams to the Rose Bowl Game. He was inducted into the Rose Bowl Hall of Fame on December 31, 2022.

== Early years ==
Hugo Bezděk was born near Prague, Bohemia (now part of the present-day Czech Republic). His forefathers had been school-teachers, strong men and athletes. His family emigrated to America in 1891 when he was 6 years old. They lived in Cleveland's Slavic community. His father James (Vaclav), worked at as a butcher in Cleveland. From here, young Hugo launched his athletic career. He enjoyed playing sports typical of the day. While he favored football, he also boxed, wrestled and played baseball.

== Coaching career ==
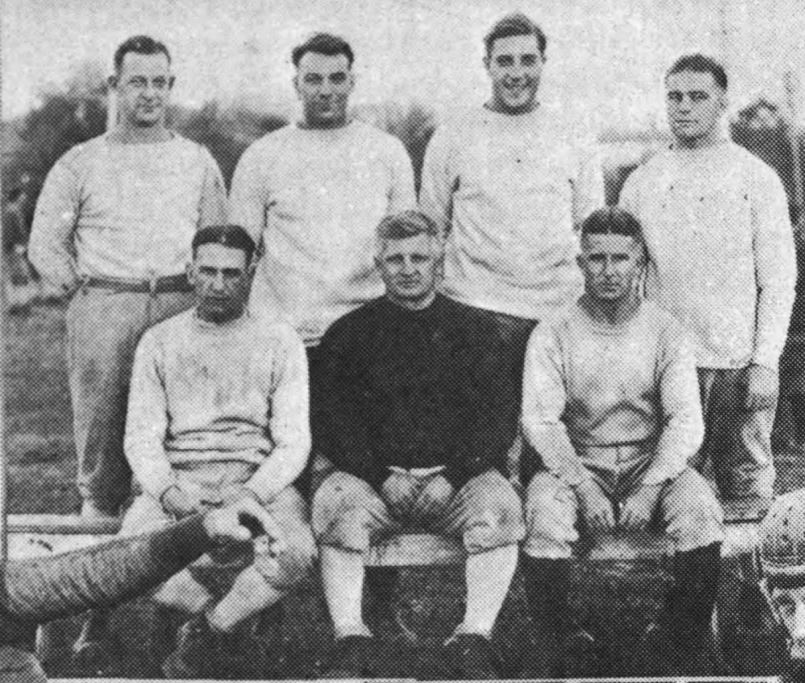
Bezdek (seated, center) with the rest of the coaching staff for the 1925 Penn State Nittany Lions football team

After playing as a fullback at the University of Chicago, Bezdek began his football coaching career at the University of Oregon in 1906, but left after a year to become head coach at the University of Arkansas. Arkansas' athletic teams were known as the Cardinals until after the 1909 season. Near the end of that year, Coach Bezdek called his team "a wild band of Razorback hogs" at an impromptu press conference following his team's victory over LSU. The name was a hit with the Arkansas students, and they voted to change the school's mascot from Cardinals to Razorbacks the following school term. Razorbacks has been Arkansas' mascot since that time. The 1909 team finished 7–0 and were considered the "Champions of the South". After five years at Arkansas, he returned to Oregon for six seasons.

While coaching in Oregon, Bezdek also served as a scout for Major League Baseball's Pittsburgh Pirates, who hired him as their manager in the middle of the 1917 season. He managed the Pirates through 1919, compiling a 166–187 record.

While managing the Pirates, Bezdek continued his football coaching career, moving from Oregon to Pennsylvania State University in 1919. He was head coach there until 1929, amassing a 65–30–11 record that included two undefeated seasons and an appearance in the 1923 Rose Bowl. Bezdek was noted for changing the Nittany Lions' style of play.

Bezdek also served as Penn State's athletic director from 1918 to 1936, was interim basketball coach in 1919, garnering an 11–2 record, and director of the School of Physical Education and Athletics from 1930 to 1937.

In 1937, Bezdek was hired by the Cleveland Rams as their first head coach after the team joined the National Football League (NFL). His career with the Rams was brief, ending three games into the 1938 season with an abysmal 1–13 record. Nevertheless, Bezdek holds the distinction of being the only person to have served as both manager of a Major League Baseball team and head coach in the NFL.

As a college football coach, Bezdek tallied a career record of 127–58–16. He was elected to the College Football Hall of Fame in 1954.

== Head coaching record ==
=== College football ===
Year	Team	Overall	Conference	Standing	Bowl/playoffs
Oregon Webfoots (Independent) (1906)
1906	Oregon	5–0–1			
Arkansas Cardinals/Razorbacks (Independent) (1908–1912)
1908	Arkansas	5–4			
1909	Arkansas	7–0			
1910	Arkansas	7–1			
1911	Arkansas	6–2–1			
1912	Arkansas	4–6			
Arkansas:		29–13–1			
Oregon Webfoots (Northwest Conference) (1913–1915)
1913	Oregon	3–3–1	1–1–1	T–3rd	
1914	Oregon	4–2–1	3–1–1	3rd	
1915	Oregon	7–2	3–1	3rd	
Oregon Webfoots (Northwest Conference / Pacific Coast Conference) (1916–1917)
1916	Oregon	7–0–1	2–0–1/ 2–0–1	2nd / 2nd	W Rose
1917	Oregon	3–3	1–2 / 1–2	4th / 4th	
Oregon:		29–10–4	11–6–3		
Mare Island Marines (Independent) (1917)
1917	Mare Island	1–0			W Rose
Mare Island:		1–0			
Penn State Nittany Lions (Independent) (1918–1929)
1918	Penn State	1–2–1			
1919	Penn State	7–1			
1920	Penn State	7–0–2			
1921	Penn State	8–0–2			
1922	Penn State	6–4–1			L Rose
1923	Penn State	6–2–1			
1924	Penn State	6–3–1			
1925	Penn State	4–4–1			
1926	Penn State	5–4			
1927	Penn State	6–2–1			
1928	Penn State	3–5–1			
1929	Penn State	6–3			
Penn State:		65–30–11			
Delaware Valley Aggies (Independent) (1949)
1949	Delaware Valley	2–5			
Delaware Valley:		2–5			
Total:		126–58–16			

=== Professional football ===
Team	Year	Regular season					Postseason			
Team	Year	Won	Lost	Ties	Win %	Finish	Won	Lost	Win %	Result
CLE	1937	1	10	0	.091	5th in NFL Western	–	–	–	–
CLE	1938	0	3	0	.000	4th in NFL Western	–	–	–	–
CLE Total		1	13	0	.071		–	–	–	–
NFL Total		1	13	0	.071		–	–	–	–
Total		1	13	0	.071		–	–	–	–

== See also ==
- List of College Football Hall of Fame inductees (coaches)
- List of presidents of the American Football Coaches Association
