= 1917 Camp Gordon football team =

American college football season

1917 Camp Gordon football
- Conference: Independent
- Record: 5–1
- Head coach: Jogger Elcock (1st season)
- Captain: Bob McWhorter

1917 military service football records
| | Conf. | | | Overall |
| Team | W | L | T | W | | L | | T |
|---|---|---|---|---|---|---|---|---|
| Mare Island Marines | | – | | 8 | – | 0 | – | 0 |
| Mineola Aviation Station | | – | | 3 | – | 0 | – | 0 |
| Camp Dix | | – | | 2 | – | 0 | – | 0 |
| Camp Jackson | | – | | 2 | – | 0 | – | 1 |
| Allentown Ambulance Corps | | – | | 5 | – | 1 | – | 0 |
| Camp Custer | | – | | 5 | – | 1 | – | 0 |
| Camp Gordon | | – | | 5 | – | 1 | – | 0 |
| Charlestown Navy Yard | | – | | 3 | – | 1 | – | 0 |
| Camp Funston | | – | | 7 | – | 3 | – | 0 |
| Camp Lewis | | – | | 5 | – | 2 | – | 1 |
| Newport Naval Reserves | | – | | 5 | – | 2 | – | 1 |
| Camp Grant | | – | | 3 | – | 1 | – | 0 |
| Camp Taylor | | – | | 2 | – | 1 | – | 0 |
| Great Lakes Navy | | – | | 4 | – | 3 | – | 0 |
| Camp Devens | | – | | 1 | – | 3 | – | 2 |
| Camp Meade | | – | | 1 | – | 2 | – | 0 |
| League Island Marines | | – | | 1 | – | 3 | – | 0 |
| Camp Upton | | – | | 0 | – | 1 | – | 0 |

The 1917 Camp Gordon football team represented Camp Gordon in Chamblee, Georgia, during the 1917 college football season.

The team was led by a backfield of former Auburn back and war hero Kirk Newell, former Mercer back Cochran, former Georgia halfback Bob McWhorter, and former Vanderbilt back Wilson Collins. Former Alabama fullback Adrian Van de Graaff backed up Collins. Kid Woodruff of Georgia backed up Newell at quarterback.

On the line, the teams ends were former Virginia player James L. White and former Auburn player Henry W. Robinson. VMI's Blandy Clarkson and Chicago's Royal were tackles. Dartmouth's Lewis and Charles H. Brown of Vanderbilt were guards. James Bond of Pitt was the team's center. Georgia's Tom Thrash was a sub tackle.

Walter Camp Jr. officiated the Camp Hancock game. Oglethorpe's coach Frank B. Anderson was umpire.

== Schedule ==
| Date | Time | Opponent | Site | Result | Attendance | Source |
|---|---|---|---|---|---|---|
| October 24 | | Oglethorpe | Parade Field; Camp Gordon, GA | W 54–0 | | |
| October 27 | 2:30 p.m. | vs. Camp Hancock | Grant Field; Atlanta, GA | W 26–0 | | |
| November 10 | | at Camp Jackson | Columbia, SC | L 0–10 | | |
| November 16 | | Tennessee (SATC) | Camp Field; Camp Gordon, GA | W 38–0 | | |
| November 24 | 2:30 p.m. | vs. Fort Oglethorpe | Grant Field; Atlanta, GA | W 35–0 | | |
| November 29 | | at Alabama | Rickwood Field; Birmingham, AL | W 19–6 | | |
All times are in Eastern time
