= 1917 Camp Devens football team =

American college football season

1917 Camp Devens football
- Conference: Independent
- Record: 1–3–2
- Head coach: Percy Haughton (1st season)

1917 military service football records
| | Conf. | | | Overall |
| Team | W | L | T | W | | L | | T |
|---|---|---|---|---|---|---|---|---|
| Mare Island Marines | | – | | 8 | – | 0 | – | 0 |
| Mineola Aviation Station | | – | | 3 | – | 0 | – | 0 |
| Camp Dix | | – | | 2 | – | 0 | – | 0 |
| Camp Jackson | | – | | 2 | – | 0 | – | 1 |
| Allentown Ambulance Corps | | – | | 5 | – | 1 | – | 0 |
| Camp Custer | | – | | 5 | – | 1 | – | 0 |
| Camp Gordon | | – | | 5 | – | 1 | – | 0 |
| Charlestown Navy Yard | | – | | 3 | – | 1 | – | 0 |
| Camp Funston | | – | | 7 | – | 3 | – | 0 |
| Camp Lewis | | – | | 5 | – | 2 | – | 1 |
| Newport Naval Reserves | | – | | 5 | – | 2 | – | 1 |
| Camp Grant | | – | | 3 | – | 1 | – | 0 |
| Camp Taylor | | – | | 2 | – | 1 | – | 0 |
| Great Lakes Navy | | – | | 4 | – | 3 | – | 0 |
| Camp Devens | | – | | 1 | – | 3 | – | 2 |
| Camp Meade | | – | | 1 | – | 2 | – | 0 |
| League Island Marines | | – | | 1 | – | 3 | – | 0 |
| Camp Upton | | – | | 0 | – | 1 | – | 0 |

The 1917 Camp Devens football team was an American football team that represented the United States Army's 76th Infantry Division stationed at Camp Devens in Ayer, Massachusetts, during the 1917 fall football season.

The team had two players named to the 1917 All-Service football team: halfback Wayland Minot (Walter Camp, 1st team); and end C. A. Coolidge (Paul Purman, 1st team).

== Schedule ==
| Date | Opponent | Site | Result | Attendance | Source |
|---|---|---|---|---|---|
| November 3 | at Charlestown Navy Yard | Harvard Stadium; Boston, MA | L 0–28 | 20,000 | |
| November 10 | at Harvard | Harvard Stadium; Boston, MA | T 0–0 | 400 | |
| November 14 | at Brown | Andrews Field; Providence, RI | L 0–40 | | |
| November 17 | vs. Camp Dix | Braves Field; Boston, MA | L 0–19 | | |
| November 24 | Camp Upton | Polo Grounds; New York, NY | W 7–0 | | |
| November 29 | Newport Naval Reserves | | T 0–0 | | |
