= 1917 Camp Custer football team =

American college football season

1917 Camp Custer football
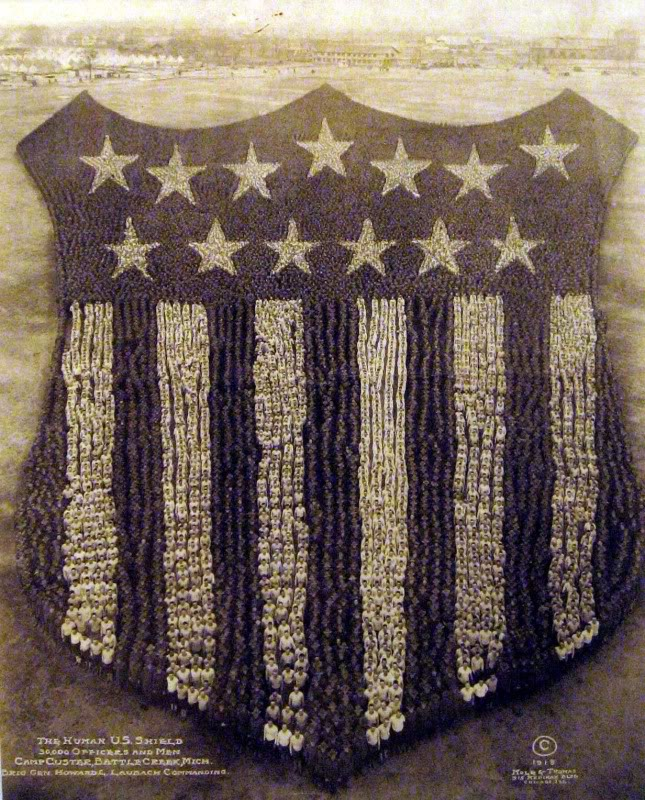
- Conference: Independent
- Record: 6–1
- Captain: William Jennings Gardner

1917 military service football records
	Conf.			Overall
Team	W	L	T	W		L		T
Mare Island Marines		–		8	–	0	–	0
Mineola Aviation Station		–		3	–	0	–	0
Camp Dix		–		2	–	0	–	0
Camp Jackson		–		2	–	0	–	1
Allentown Ambulance Corps		–		5	–	1	–	0
Camp Custer		–		5	–	1	–	0
Camp Gordon		–		5	–	1	–	0
Charlestown Navy Yard		–		3	–	1	–	0
Camp Funston		–		7	–	3	–	0
Camp Lewis		–		5	–	2	–	1
Newport Naval Reserves		–		5	–	2	–	1
Camp Grant		–		3	–	1	–	0
Camp Taylor		–		2	–	1	–	0
Great Lakes Navy		–		4	–	3	–	0
Camp Devens		–		1	–	3	–	2
Camp Meade		–		1	–	2	–	0
League Island Marines		–		1	–	3	–	0
Camp Upton		–		0	–	1	–	0

The 1917 Camp Custer football team was an American football team made up of United States Army officers from the 85th Infantry Division stationed at Camp Custer in Battle Creek, Michigan. The Camp Custer officers played games against professional football teams (the Fort Wayne Friars and Detroit Heralds) as well as other service teams.

Harry Costello, who won All-Southern honors while playing for Georgetown, was the team's quarterback. The team's backfield also included former Michigan Agricultural College stars Blake Miller and Neno DaPrato. William Jennings Gardner was the captain.

Fielding H. Yost of Michigan coached the Camp Custer team in the week leading up to the game with Camp Grant. Amos Alonzo Stagg and Fred J. Murphy coached the Camp Custer team. Ring Lardner attended the Camp Grant game and wrote a column describing the spectacle.

== Schedule ==
Date	Time	Opponent	Site	Result	Attendance	Source
October 7		at Fort Wayne Friars	Fort Wayne, IN	W 9–0		
October 20		vs. Great Lakes Navy	Navin Field; Detroit, MI	W 7–0		
October 24	3:00 p.m.	Kalamazoo	Field opposite General Dickman's home; Battle Creek, MI	W 34–7		
October 28		at Flint Independents	Flint, MI	W 34–3	3,000	
November 3		at Camp Harlee	Grand Rapids, MI	W 34–0		
November 11		at Detroit Heralds	Navin Field; Detroit, MI	W 13–0	15,000	
November 24		at Fort Niagara	Buffalo Baseball Park; Buffalo, NY	Cancelled		
December 1		vs. Camp Grant	Stagg Field; Chicago, IL	L 13–14		

== Season overview ==
=== Game 5: Detroit Heralds ===
On November 11, Camp Custer defeated the Detroit Heralds, a professional football team starring Birtie Maher, Norb Sacksteder, Ray Whipple, Joe Windbiel, and Lou Usher, and that began playing in the National Football League in 1920. The game drew a crowd of close to 15,000 persons at Navin Field. Camp Custer won by a 13-0 score. Right end Thompson scored a touchdown in the second quarter, and quarterback Harry Costello drop-kicked two field goals. Walter Eckersall was the referee.
