= 1917 Camp Lewis football team =

American college football season

1917 Camp Lewis football
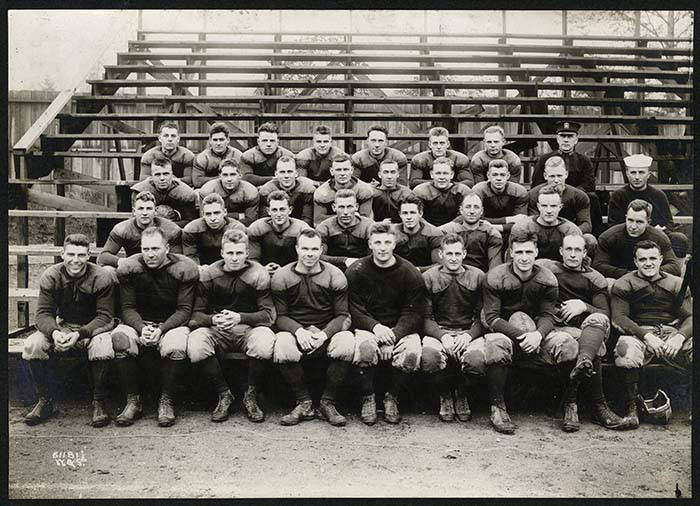

Rose Bowl, L 7–19 vs. Mare Island
- Conference: Independent
- Record: 5–2–1
- Head coach: Fox Stanton (1st season)
- Home stadium: Tacoma Stadium, Lewis Field

1917 military service football records
	Conf.			Overall
Team	W	L	T	W		L		T
Mare Island Marines		–		8	–	0	–	0
Mineola Aviation Station		–		3	–	0	–	0
Camp Dix		–		2	–	0	–	0
Camp Jackson		–		2	–	0	–	1
Allentown Ambulance Corps		–		5	–	1	–	0
Camp Custer		–		5	–	1	–	0
Camp Gordon		–		5	–	1	–	0
Charlestown Navy Yard		–		3	–	1	–	0
Camp Funston		–		7	–	3	–	0
Camp Lewis		–		5	–	2	–	1
Newport Naval Reserves		–		5	–	2	–	1
Camp Grant		–		3	–	1	–	0
Camp Taylor		–		2	–	1	–	0
Great Lakes Navy		–		4	–	3	–	0
Camp Devens		–		1	–	3	–	2
Camp Meade		–		1	–	2	–	0
League Island Marines		–		1	–	3	–	0
Camp Upton		–		0	–	1	–	0

The 1917 Camp Lewis football team represented the United States Army's 91st Division (also known as the "Wild West Division") in the 1917 college football season. The team was based at Camp Lewis in Tacoma, Washington, and compiled a 5–2–1 record. Both losses came against California's Mare Island Marines, including a rematch in the 1918 Rose Bowl.

Camp Lewis was built in 1917 after the United States entry into World War I. By early October, 35,000 recruits from the western states were crowded into barracks there. Football games between the regiments stationed at the camp were arranged in the early autumn.

A team made up of officers from the 362nd Infantry Regiment played Washington State to a scoreless tie at Tacoma Stadium on October 13.

Later, an all-cantonment team consisting of players from the entire 91st Division was formed to represent Camp Lewis. The Camp Lewis team was coached by Lieutenant Fox Stanton, assisted by Major J. L. Weir.

== Schedule ==
Date	Opponent	Site	Result	Attendance	Source
October 27	Oregon Medical Corps	Tacoma Stadium; Tacoma, WA	T 0–0		
November 3	Oregon Agricultural freshman	Camp Lewis; Tacoma, WA	W 20–0		
November 10	Mare Island	Tacoma Stadium; Tacoma, WA	L 0–13	25,000	
November 17	Multnomah Athletic Club	Camp Lewis; Tacoma, WA	W 10–3		
November 24	Chemawa	Camp Lewis; Tacoma, WA	W 49–0		
November 29	Seattle Naval Station	Tacoma Stadium; Tacoma, WA	W 14–13		
December 8	Fort Stevens	Lewis Field; Tacoma, WA	W 53–0		
January 1, 1918	vs. Mare Island Marines	Tournament Park; Pasadena, CA (Rose Bowl)	L 7–19	25,000	
