= 1918 Rose Bowl =

American college football game

1918 Tournament East-West football game
- 4th Rose Bowl Game
Mare Island Marines	Camp Lewis Army
(5–0)	(5–1–1)
Independent	Independent
19	7
Head coach: Hugo Bezdek	Head coach: Fox Stanton
	1	2	3	4	Total
Mare Island	0	9	0	10	19
Camp Lewis	0	7	0	0	7
- Date: January 1, 1918
- Season: 1917
- Stadium: Tournament Park
- Location: Pasadena, California
- MVP: Hollis Huntington (B) – USMC
- Attendance: 25,000

The 1918 Rose Bowl, known at the time as the Tournament East-West Football Game, was a bowl game played on January 1, 1918, at Tournament Park in Pasadena, California. It was the 4th Rose Bowl Game. With America at war, the game was played with players from the Mare Island Marines of California and Camp Lewis from Washington.

== Game summary ==
Since the Rose Bowl game became so popular and most of the college football players were fighting overseas during World War I, the Pasadena Tournament of Roses decided to stage the game with military units, with the approval from President Woodrow Wilson. The Camp Lewis football team represented the US Army.

== Scoring ==
	1	2	3	4	Total
Mare Island	0	9	0	10	19
Camp Lewis	0	7	0	0	7

Qtr.	Team	Scoring play	Score
2	MARE	Ambrose 31 yard FG	MARE 3–0
2	LEW	Romney 6 yard rush, Sharpe kick	LEW 7–3
2	MARE	Brown 5 yard rush, kick failed	MARE 9–7
4	MARE	Huntington 1 yard rush, Ambrose kick	MARE 16–7
4	MARE	Ambrose 33 yard FG	MARE 19–7

== Game notes ==
According to the Tournament of Roses, "Within weeks of the 1918 Rose Bowl Game, the majority of the players from both teams were scheduled to go overseas. John Beckett, left tackle for Mare Island, acknowledged this fact and said that “this would be the last battle that we would fight in the name of sports."

Hugo Bezdek was the coach to lead two separate schools (Oregon in 1917 and Mare Island in 1918) to victories. He also led Penn State to an appearance in the 1923 Rose Bowl.

Dick Romney, who had been a football star at Utah, played halfback for the Camp Lewis team, scoring the team's only touchdown.
