= 1917 Great Lakes Navy Bluejackets football team =

American college football season

1917 Great Lakes Navy Bluejackets football
- Conference: Independent
- Record: 4–3
- Head coach: Lt. E. D. Angell (1st season)
- Home stadium: Station athletic field

1917 military service football records
	Conf.			Overall
Team	W	L	T	W		L		T
Mare Island Marines		–		8	–	0	–	0
Mineola Aviation Station		–		3	–	0	–	0
Camp Dix		–		2	–	0	–	0
Camp Jackson		–		2	–	0	–	1
Allentown Ambulance Corps		–		5	–	1	–	0
Camp Custer		–		5	–	1	–	0
Camp Gordon		–		5	–	1	–	0
Charlestown Navy Yard		–		3	–	1	–	0
Camp Funston		–		7	–	3	–	0
Camp Lewis		–		5	–	2	–	1
Newport Naval Reserves		–		5	–	2	–	1
Camp Grant		–		3	–	1	–	0
Camp Taylor		–		2	–	1	–	0
Great Lakes Navy		–		4	–	3	–	0
Camp Devens		–		1	–	3	–	2
Camp Meade		–		1	–	2	–	0
League Island Marines		–		1	–	3	–	0
Camp Upton		–		0	–	1	–	0

The 1917 Great Lakes Navy Bluejackets football team ("Jackies") represented the Great Lakes Naval Station, the United States Navy's boot camp located near North Chicago, Illinois, during the 1917 college football season. Led by head coach, Lieutenant E. D. Angell, the team compiled a 4–3 record.

Several former Michigan Wolverines played for the Great Lakes team, including fullback Cedric "Pat" Smith, guards Albert Benbrook and Alvin Loucks, and halfback Philip Raymond. Minnesota native Hal Erickson also starred at halfback for Great Lakes.

John Philip Sousa was commissioned as a lieutenant in the Navy in 1917 and assigned to the Great Lakes Naval Station where he led the Great Lakes Band. Prior to kickoff of the Thanksgiving Day game at Stagg Field, Sousa led the band of 400 men in renditions of Sousa's "El Capitan" march and "The Star-Spangled Banner". At halftime, the band followed with "America, Here's My Boy" and "Joan of Arc". When the crowd called out for "Over There", the band complied, and the Great Lakes sailors responded with a snake dance on the field. At the end of the game, a 27–0 victory for Great Lakes, the band played "Chopin's Funeral March" for the Fort Sheridan team.

== Schedule ==
Date	Opponent	Site	Result	Attendance	Source
September 29	at Marquette	Milwaukee, WI	L 7–14		
October 20	vs. Camp Custer	Navin Field; Detroit, MI	L 0–7		
October 25	Haskell	Station athletic field; Lake Bluff, IL	W 20–16	10,000	
November 3	at Iowa	Iowa Field; Iowa City, IA	W 23–14		
November 17	at Camp Grant	Kishwaukee Park; Rockford, IL	W 9–6		
November 24	vs. Camp Funston	Association Park; Kansas City, MO	L 0–7	15,000	
November 29	vs. Fort Sheridan	Stagg Field; Chicago, IL	W 27–0	10,000	
