= Fox Stanton =

American football player and coach (1874–1946)

Biographical details
- Born: May 20, 1874; New Jersey, U.S.
- Died: November 28, 1946 (aged 72); Olympia, Washington, U.S.

Playing career
- 1892: Drexel
- 1894–1896: Pennington
- Position: Halfback

Coaching career (HC unless noted)
- 1908–1915: Pomona
- 1916: Occidental
- 1917: Camp Lewis
- 1918–1920: Occidental
- 1921–1941: Caltech

Head coaching record
- Overall: 116–133–18
- Bowls: 0–1

Accomplishments and honors

Championships
- 4 SCC (1916, 1923, 1930–1931)

William Layton "Fox" Stanton (May 20, 1874 – November 28, 1946) was an American college football player and coach. He served as the head football coach at Pomona College from 1908 to 1915, at Occidental College in 1916 and again from 1918 to 1920, and at the California Institute of Technology (Caltech) from 1921 to 1941. Stanton also coached a United States Army team from Fort Lewis in the 1918 Rose Bowl. died at the age of 72 on November 28, 1946, in Olympia, Washington.

== Head coaching record ==
Year	Team	Overall	Conference	Standing	Bowl/playoffs
Pomona Sagehens (Independent) (1908–1914)
1908	Pomona	2–4–1			
1909	Pomona	6–1–1			
1910	Pomona	6–0–1			
1911	Pomona	7–0			
1912	Pomona	4–2			
1913	Pomona	5–1–2			
1914	Pomona	8–1			
Pomona Sagehens (Southern California Conference) (1915)
1915	Pomona	3–4			
Pomona:		41–13–5			
Occidental Tigers (Southern California Conference) (1916)
1916	Occidental	6–0–1	3–0–1	T–1st	
Camp Lewis (Independent) (1917)
1917	Camp Lewis	5–2–1			L Rose
Camp Lewis:		5–2–1			
Occidental Tigers (Southern California Conference) (1918–1920)
1918	Occidental	3–4			
1919	Occidental	3–4	3–1	2nd	
1920	Occidental	4–3	3–2	T–2nd	
Occidental:		16–11–1			
Caltech Beavers (Southern California Conference) (1921–1933)
1921	Caltech	3–3–1	2–2–1	4th	
1922	Caltech	3–3	3–2	3rd	
1923	Caltech	5–4	4–1	T–1st	
1924	Caltech	3–6	1–4	5th	
1925	Caltech	2–6–1	1–2–1	4th	
1921	Caltech	4–3–1	3–2	T–4th	
1927	Caltech	2–5–1	2–3–1	T–4th	
1928	Caltech	5–3–1	4–1–1	T–2nd	
1929	Caltech	3–6	3–3	T–4th	
1930	Caltech	5–3–1	4–0	1st	
1931	Caltech	6–2–1	5–1	1st	
1932	Caltech	2–7	2–5	7th	
1933	Caltech	2–7	2–5	T–5th	
Caltech Beavers (Independent) (1934–1937)
1934	Caltech	1–7			
1935	Caltech	1–7			
1936	Caltech	0–6–1			
1937	Caltech	0–6–2			
Caltech Beavers (Southern California Conference) (1938–1941)
1938	Caltech	1–7	0–3	T–6th	
1939	Caltech	2–6	0–4	5th	
1940	Caltech	2–5–1	0–4	5th	
1941	Caltech	2–5	1–3	4th	
Caltech:		54–107–11	37–45–4		
Total:		116–133–18			
National championship Conference title Conference division title or championship game berth
