= 1917 Camp Funston football team =

American college football season

1917 Camp Funston football
- Conference: Independent
- Record: 7–3
- Head coach: Paul Withington (1st season)

1917 military service football records
	Conf.			Overall
Team	W	L	T	W		L		T
Mare Island Marines		–		8	–	0	–	0
Mineola Aviation Station		–		3	–	0	–	0
Camp Dix		–		2	–	0	–	0
Camp Jackson		–		2	–	0	–	1
Allentown Ambulance Corps		–		5	–	1	–	0
Camp Custer		–		5	–	1	–	0
Camp Gordon		–		5	–	1	–	0
Charlestown Navy Yard		–		3	–	1	–	0
Camp Funston		–		7	–	3	–	0
Camp Lewis		–		5	–	2	–	1
Newport Naval Reserves		–		5	–	2	–	1
Camp Grant		–		3	–	1	–	0
Camp Taylor		–		2	–	1	–	0
Great Lakes Navy		–		4	–	3	–	0
Camp Devens		–		1	–	3	–	2
Camp Meade		–		1	–	2	–	0
League Island Marines		–		1	–	3	–	0
Camp Upton		–		0	–	1	–	0

The 1917 Camp Funston football team represented the United States Army's 89th Infantry Division based at Camp Funston, Fort Riley, near Manhattan, Kansas, during the 1917 college football season. The team was coached by Paul Withington, who had been the head coach at Wisconsin in 1916.

The team's leading players included Potsy Clark and Adrian Lindsey.

== Schedule ==
Date	Opponent	Site	Result	Attendance	Source
	13th Cavalry		W 49–0		
October 13	at St. Mary's (KS)	St. Marys, KS	W 10–0		
October 20	Iowa State Teachers	Camp Funston; Fort Riley, KS	W 33–0		
October 27	Colorado College	Camp Funston; Fort Riley, KS	W 46–0		
November 3	Kendall	Camp Funston; Fort Riley, KS	W 15–6		
November 24	vs. Great Lakes Navy	Association Park; Kansas City, MO	W 7–0	15,000	
November 29	Illinois	Camp Funston; Kansas	L 0–28		
November 29	vs. Camp Doniphan	Miner's Park; Joplin, MO	W 11–0	2,000	
December 1	vs. Camp Dodge	Omaha, NE	L 0–3	7,000	
December 17	at Camp MacArthur	Waco, TX	L 6–12		
