= 1917 Fort Sheridan football team =

American college football season

1917 Fort Sheridan football
- Conference: Independent

The 1917 Fort Sheridan football team represented Officers Reserve Training Camp at Fort Sheridan located north of Chicago during the 1917 college football season. The team included former Michigan Wolvereines stars Albert Benbrook and Ernest Allmendinger, and former Chicago Maroons star Paul Des Jardien.

== Schedule ==
Date	Opponent	Site	Result	Attendance	Source
November 29	Great Lakes Navy	Stagg Field; Chicago, IL	L 0–27	10,000	
