= William Jennings Gardner =

American football player, coach and law-enforcement agent

Profile
- Positions: Fullback, end, tackle

Personal information
- Born: January 23, 1884; North Dakota, U.S.
- Died: June 15, 1965 (aged 81); Prescott, Arizona, U.S.
- Listed height: 5 ft 11 in (1.80 m)
- Listed weight: 172 lb (78 kg)

Career information
- College: Carlisle

Career history
- 1904–1907: Carlisle

Awards and highlights
- First-team All-Service (1917); Knute Rockne All-Time All-American team

Other information
- Military career
- Allegiance: United States
- Branch: U.S. Army
- Service years: 1917–1919
- Conflicts: World War I: Western Front

William Jennings Gardner (January 23, 1884 – June 15, 1965) was an American football player, coach, and law-enforcement agent. While working as a Prohibition agent in Chicago, Illinois, Gardner served with Eliot Ness's "Untouchables," a group of hand-picked federal agents who, from 1930 to 1932, sought to put an end to Al Capone's illegal empire. Although Gardner was only involved with the group for a short period of time, he would be prominently mentioned in Ness's memoir of the investigation, The Untouchables, and inspire a recurring character in the 1959 television series based upon that book.

== Background ==
=== Early life ===
Gardner was born in North Dakota to Ojibwe parents. At an early age he and his brother, George, were taken from the Turtle Mountain Indian Reservation and sent to Carlisle, Pennsylvania to attend the Carlisle Indian Industrial School.

=== Football career and athletics ===
Gardner, who stood just under six feet and 172 pounds at the time, played end, tackle, and fullback from 1904 to 1907, helping the little school defeat the powers of the time, which were Yale, Harvard, Princeton and Pennsylvania—known as the "Big Four". He also set a school record in track for the half mile, and also played basketball and baseball. Gardner enrolled in Dickinson School of Law his senior year in 1907. "Pop" Warner described his 1907 team as "nearly perfect", but was upset that Walter Camp had left Gardner off his All-American team. Later in the 1930s, Knute Rockne named Gardner to his All-Time All-American team for Collier's.

Gardner then served as coach at duPont Manual High School in Louisville, Kentucky from 1908 through 1911. Gardner was normally described in newspapers of the day as reserved, but sometimes he had a "wolf - like nervousness". One newspaper referred to him as "the 'Indian' athlete". Gardner had a feared trickery as a football coach. The Director of Harvard's Hemenway Gymnasium found him to be one of the strongest Americans in 1911, conferred after a series of measurements and physical tests. Gardner even outscored renowned boxers John L. Sullivan, Jack Johnson, and James J. Jeffries. Gardner then became director of athletics at Otterbein University. He then played on an all-star team in Atlanta and while in Indiana, Gardner recruited another star—Jim Thorpe.

In August 1920, Gardner was appointed as the physical direct and coach of all athletics at the head baseball coach at St. Edward's College—now known as –St. Edward's University—in Austin, Texas. In July 1921, he was hired as the athletic director and head football coach at Southwestern University in Georgetown, Texas.

=== Family life and war ===
Gardner finished law school in 1909 and was admitted to the Louisville bar in 1910. Gardner enlisted in the United States Army as a private during World War I and became the only "Indian" to receive a captain's commission at Fort Sheridan. As usual, Gardner captained the Camp Custer football team. He fought in the trenches in France and his pension stated that he had been gassed. Gardner married Alene French, a socialite from Niles, Michigan, in 1919, and fathered one son, Frank Gardner, and two daughters: Jacqueline Gardner Carson and Alene Gardner Schnapf. The Gardner family traveled all over the United States, from Maryland to Texas, primarily because of Bill's highly mobile professional lifestyle, involved in both law and athletics.

== The Untouchables ==
Gardner joined the Bureau of Prohibition in 1926. Two years later, he served alongside Eliot Ness on a squad of special agents sent to Chicago with orders to combat the rampant bootlegging and lawlessness caused by Prohibition.

In late 1930, Ness was chosen to lead a smaller, select unit of Prohibition agents specifically ordered to investigate the bootlegging operations of the Chicago Outfit run by Al Capone. Gardner was one of the first six agents Ness selected for the group, which would later become known as "The Untouchables" after Ness and other agents refused large bribes from the Capone Outfit.

Less than two months after joining the squad, Gardner absented himself from duty without official leave, then abruptly returned only to resign from the bureau three weeks later. Although Gardner did participate in the early stages of the Untouchables' investigation, he took no part in the high-profile raids that would make Ness's unit famous.

== Later life ==
Gardner later rejoined the Prohibition Bureau but was dismissed around the time of Prohibition's repeal. Suffering from alcoholism in his later years, he died at the age of 81 from an illness at the Prescott Veterans Hospital in 1965. He was buried at the Prescott National Cemetery in Arizona, on June 17, 1965. His grave site number is 86, section number 12, row E.

Despite only working with the Untouchables for five weeks, Gardner was the real-life inspiration behind Abel Fernandez's character of Agent William "Bill" Youngfellow, serving under Robert Stack's Eliot Ness in the original 1959–1963 The Untouchables T.V. series. He also inspired Michael Horse's character, George Steelman, Native American agent under Tom Amandes's Ness, in the revived series syndicated to local stations in 1993.

== Head coaching record ==
=== College football ===
Year	Team	Overall	Conference	Standing	Bowl/playoffs
Otterbein Cardinals (Independent) (1912)
1912	Otterbein	1–9			
Otterbein:		1–9			
St. Edward's Saints (Texas Intercollegiate Athletic Association) (1920)
1920	St. Edward's	7–2			
St. Edward's:		7–2			
Southwestern Pirates (Texas Intercollegiate Athletic Association) (1921–1924)
1921	Southwestern	0–6–1	0–3–1	T–8th	
1922	Southwestern	4–6	2–3	7th	
1923	Southwestern	2–5–1	2–1–1	T–3rd	
1924	Southwestern	4–5	3–2	5th	
Southwestern:		10–22–1	7–9–2		
Total:		18–33–1			
