= Tournament Park =

Californian park and athletics venue

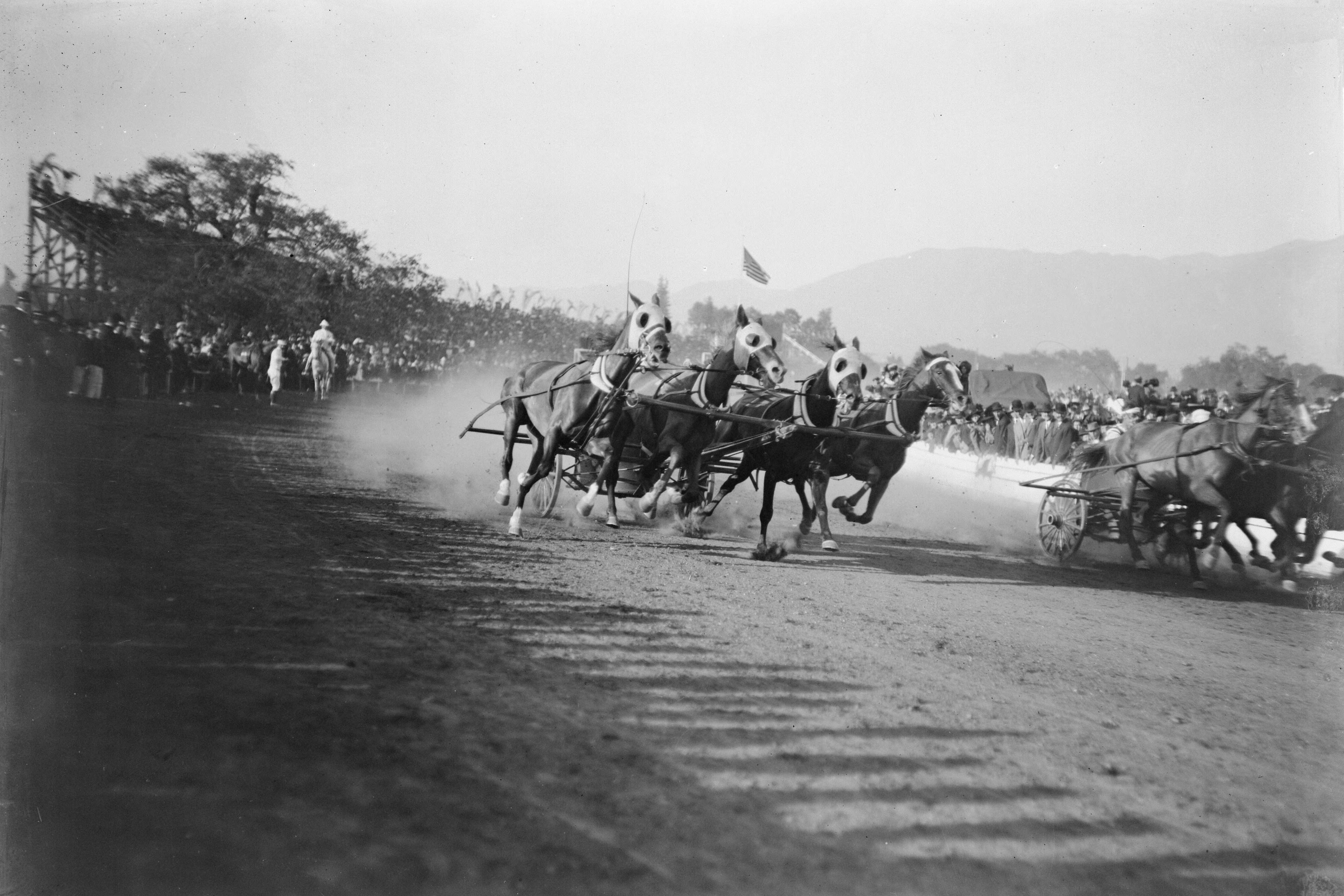
- Tournament of Roses chariot race, 1911

- Location within the United States Location within California
- Location: Pasadena, California
- Coordinates: 34.133°N 118.126°W
- Elevation: 750 feet (230 m) AMSL
- Status: Always open

Tournament Park is a park and athletics venue in Pasadena, California, United States, northeast of Los Angeles. Currently maintained by the California Institute of Technology, it was simply known as the "town lot" before being renamed "Tournament Park" in 1900. Tournament Park gets its name from the Tournament of Roses, and it served as a venue in the early 20th century for events associated with the Tournament, such as chariot races, ostrich races, and even a race between a camel and an elephant. Besides hosting Tournament of Roses events, the venue hosted other events at the turn of the 20th century, such as the Southern California Horse Show Association's annual horse show. Tournament Park is best known as the site of the first eight Rose Bowl Games (1902, 1916–1922).

== Background ==
Its seating capacity in 1922 was 43,000, many of which were in temporary wooden bleachers that the city deemed unsafe, thus necessitating the construction of the Rose Bowl stadium, about two miles (3 km) northwest. Tournament Park hosted a handful of USC football games, chiefly against out-of-state opponents, in the 1910s and 1920s prior to the construction of Los Angeles Memorial Coliseum, since the park dwarfed USC's then on-campus venue of Bovard Field.

Following the departure of the New Year's Day game to the new stadium in 1923, the facility's capacity was reduced substantially, though the parade route ended at Tournament Park for a number of years following the Rose Bowl's completion. Tournament Park, along with the Rose Bowl, served as the venue for Caltech's football team until the school dropped the program.

The stadium site, now known as South Athletic Field, is bounded by the Fox-Stanton Track (named after former Caltech football coach Fox Stanton), and continues to serve as Caltech's track and field venue. The surrounding park, which continues under the Tournament Park moniker, contains a playground and picnic facility.

The elevation of the park is approximately 750 feet (230 m) above sea level.

== Calbraith Perry Rodgers Transcontinental flight ==
On November 5, 1911, aviation pioneer Calbraith Perry Rodgers landed his Wright Model EX biplane at Tournament Park, in front of a crowd of 20,000. The plane was named the Vin Fiz, after a grape soda producted by Rodgers sponsor the Armour and Company. This was the first transcontinental multi-stop flight across the United States. In 1962, the Pasadena Pioneer Association installed a historical marker to recall the event. The historical marker also recalled other firsts: Roy Knabenshue flew a dirigible from here on March 20, 1909. Also Charles Willard landed in his airplane at the park on March 31, 1911.

== Bowl games at Tournament Park ==
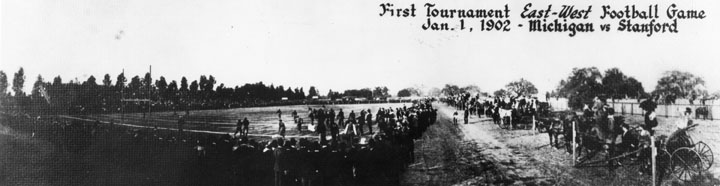
The first Rose Bowl Game in 1902

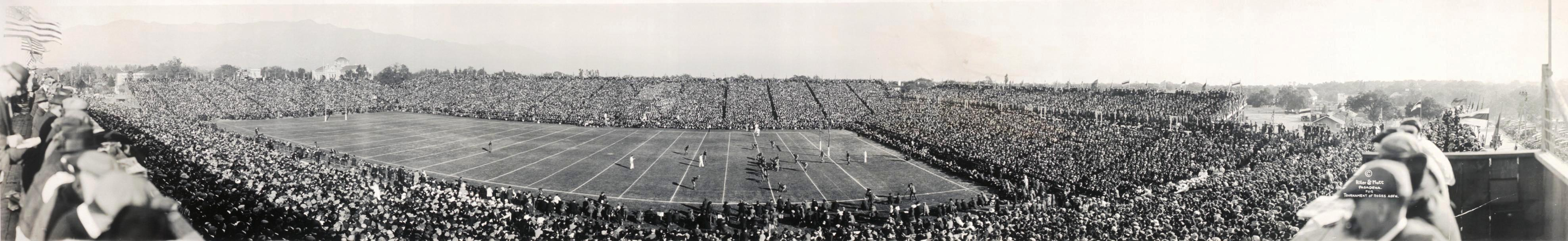
1921 Rose Bowl

== See also ==
- 1902 Rose Bowl
- 1916 Rose Bowl
- Tournament of Roses Parade

Preceded by First site	Host of the Rose Bowl Game; 1902, 1916–1922	Succeeded by Rose Bowl Stadium
