= Frank Glick =

American football player and coach (1893–1979)

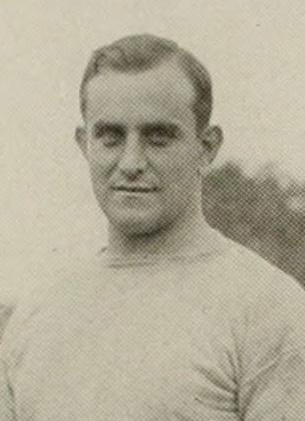
- Glick pictured in The Epitome 1922, Lehigh yearbook

Biographical details
- Born: August 22, 1893; Pittsburgh, Pennsylvania, U.S.
- Died: August 13, 1979 (aged 85); Redding Ridge, Connecticut, U.S.

Playing career
- 1913–1915: Princeton
- Positions: Halfback, end

Coaching career (HC unless noted)
- 1919–1920: Princeton (backs)
- 1921: Lehigh

Head coaching record
- Overall: 4–4

Frank Glick (August 22, 1893 – August 13, 1979) was an American college football player and coach. He was the 14th head football coach at Lehigh University in Bethlehem, Pennsylvania and he held that position for the 1921 season. His overall coaching record at Lehigh was 4–4.

== Head coaching record ==
Year	Team	Overall	Conference	Standing	Bowl/playoffs
Lehigh Brown and White (Independent) (1921)
1921	Lehigh	4–4			
Lehigh:		4–4			
Total:		4–4			
