= Charles Willard Diffin =

American engineer

Charles Willard Diffin (1884-1966) was an American engineer, salesman and author. He is known best for his science-fiction stories, although he published several works in the genres of Western and mystery.

He debuted in 1930 in the science fiction magazine Astounding Stories.
