= Charley Barrett =

American football player (1893–1924)

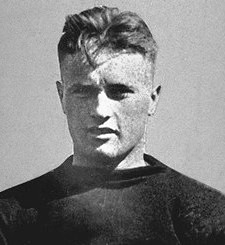
- Barrett, c. 1914

No. 8
- Position: Quarterback

Personal information
- Born: November 3, 1893; Bellevue, Pennsylvania, U.S.
- Died: May 21, 1924 (aged 30); Tucson, Arizona, U.S.
- Listed height: 6 ft 0 in (1.83 m)
- Listed weight: 180 lb (82 kg)

Career information
- College: Cornell (1914–1915)

Awards and highlights
- National champion (1915); 2× Consensus All-American (1914, 1915); First-team All-Service (1917)
- College Football Hall of Fame

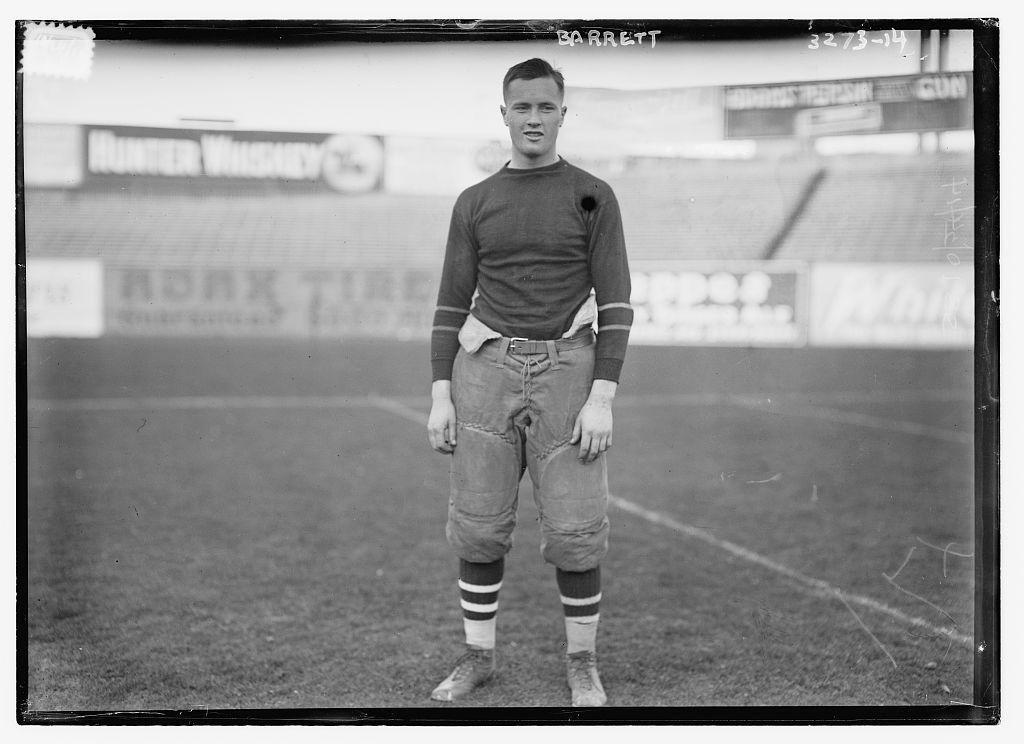
Charley Barrett in 1914

Charley "Chuck" Barrett (November 3, 1893 – May 21, 1924) was an American football player. He was the consensus All-American quarterback in 1914 and 1915 while playing for Cornell University and led Cornell to an undefeated season and national championship in 1915. He was elected to the College Football Hall of Fame in 1958.

== Early life ==
Barrett was born in Bellevue, Pennsylvania, and raised in Cleveland, Ohio. He attended the University School in Cleveland before enrolling at Cornell University.

== Cornell ==
At Cornell, Barrett was quarterback for the football team and a pitcher for the baseball team. He was Cornell's quarterback from 1913 to 1915 where he developed a reputation as "a real triple threat man" who kept opponents guessing, with his talents as a rusher, passer and kicker. He led Cornell to a record of 8–2 in 1914 and 9–0 in 1915. The undefeated 1915 team was recognized as the national football champion and became known as "the 'Big Red' machine."

In Barrett's final college football game, Cornell trailed the Penn by a score of 9–0, but Barrett scored 24 points to lead the Big Red to a 24–9 victory. He scored on runs of 40, 25 and three yards and drop-kicked a field goal and three extra points. Barrett was selected as the consensus first-team All-American quarterback in both 1914 and 1915. He was also selected by his teammates as the captain of the 1915 football team. The New York Times called him "the greatest football player ever developed at Cornell."

Barrett had difficulties keeping up with his classwork as a mechanical engineering student and was placed on academic probation in February 1915. The probation was removed in time for Barrett to play for the football team in the fall of 1915. In February 1916, Barrett was "busted out" of Cornell's College of Mechanical Engineering for failure to meet his scholastic requirements.

== Later years and death ==
Barrett served as an ensign in the United States Navy during World War I. In 1918, he was injured in an explosion on the armored cruiser USS Brooklyn in Yokohama harbor and never fully recovered from the injuries. After returning to the United States, Barrett lived in Bellevue, Pennsylvania. In November 1919, he married Edna Stevens in a private ceremony at the home of the bride's sister. Barrett and his wife had two daughters.

Barrett later went into the real estate business in Los Angeles, California. He moved to Tucson, Arizona in 1923, hoping to recover his health. He died in Tucson in May 1924 at age 30.

In 1925, a bronze tablet was unveiled in the lobby of Cornell's Schoellkopf Memorial Clubhouse containing the following tribute to Barrett: "In memory of Charles Barrett, who died May 21, 1924, as a result of illness contracted in an explosion on the U.S.S. Brooklyn in Yokohama Harbor, Japan, during the World War. As a tribute to his splendid loyalty and leadership and as homage to a most worthy gridiron adversary, we respectfully dedicate this tablet to Cornell University. His teammates and friends, and the 1915 Pennsylvania football team."
