= Paul Purman =

American journalist

- Born: April 19, 1886; Monroeville, Indiana, U.S.
- Died: April 18, 1937 (aged 50); Kentucky, U.S.
- Occupation: Sportswriter

Paul R. Purman (April 19, 1886 – April 18, 1937) was an American sportswriter. Purman had a lengthy career in journalism, but he is best known for his work in the years from 1916 to 1918 when his sports column was syndicated in hundreds of newspapers and he selected an annual All-America football team for the Newspaper Enterprise Association.

== Early years ==
Purman was born in 1886 at Monroeville, Indiana. His father James Nelson Purman was a merchant in Montpelier, Indiana, operating Purman, Johnston & Co.' Big Store. Purman attended preparatory school in Annapolis, Maryland, and was appointed to the United States Naval Academy. However, he failed the physical examination "on account of an affliction of his eyes." Purman enrolled instead at Indiana University Bloomington. In 1907, he worked for the Indiana Pipe Line Company and the Ohio Oil Company.

== Journalist ==
Purman began his career in journalism with The Evening Herald in his hometown of Montpelier, Indiana. In August 1907, he accepted a full-time position as a reporter for the Bluffton Banner in Bluffton, Indiana. In November 1907, he moved to Danville, Illinois as a reporter for a newspaper there. He later returned to Montplier as the editor of The Evening Herald. He next joined the staff of the Marion Chronicle in approximately 1910.

From 1916 to 1918, Purman became a nationally syndicated sportswriter. He was affiliated with the Newspaper Enterprise Association, a syndicate of several hundred newspapers, and selected an annual college football All-America team for the NEA.

In the 1920s, he returned to Cleveland and became the news editor for Midweek Magazine.

== Selected articles by Purman ==
- Chick Harley Western Star of 1916 Season (Chic Harley), November 26, 1916
- Nap Lajoie Is Through: Master Ball Player Gives Up Baseball After 20 Years! (Nap Lajoie), November 26, 1916
- Chronicle's Own All-American 1916 Football Team (1916 College Football All-America Team), December 3, 1916
- Charity Backs Prizefighter for Charity When Carpentier Boxes for French Soldiers Relief! (Georges Carpentier), December 1916
- Ball Players With Prominent Noses Nearly Always Deliver, December 11, 1916
- Kid M'Coy, Divorce Champion, Loses Decision In Eighth Matrimonial Engagement! (Kid McCoy), December 17, 1916
- The New Woman: She Will Be Athletic and Compete with Man at His Own Game (Alexa Stirling), December 18, 1916
- Hunting Toll Is Severe: America's Most Dangerous Sport Claims Over One Hundred Fifty lives in Fifteen States This Year, December 21, 1916
- K.O. Punch! Only Two Places Real Knockout Can Be Landed, Says Johnny Kilbane, Featherweight Champion of the World! (Johnny Kilbane), December 23, 1916
- Stars Haven't 'Old Fire', December 31, 1916
- What Will 1917 Bring To Sport? 1916 Produced New Records, January 4, 1917
- Fultz In the Fight to a Finish (Dave Fultz), January 27, 1917
- Dode Paskert Invents Plan To Fool Fielders (Dode Paskert), January 30, 1917
- Why Alexander Wants More Coin! Phillies Great Pitcher Is Paid Less Than Any Other Great Baseball Star (Grover Cleveland Alexander), February 18, 1917
- Sothoron Looks Like Iron Man: Recruit Pitcher of Browns May Prove Star (Allen Sothoron), April 22, 1917
- Old Orioles' Base Stealing Quartet (Hughie Jennings, John McGraw, Willie Keeler, Joe Kelley), May 6, 1917
- Batting Faces: Watch Your Favorite Next Time He Takes A Wallop At The Ball, You Won't Recognize Him, July 23, 1917
- Cobb Sets Huge Task For Self: Hopes To Tie Jess Burkett's Record by Batting Over 400 for Trio of Seasons (Ty Cobb), July 24, 1917
- Lefty Williams May Be Dark Horse of Series (Lefty Williams), September 26, 1917
- Cicotte Tells The Secret of the 'Shine Ball' (Eddie Cicotte), September 26, 1917
- Sisler Only Ball Player Who Can Hope to Fill Ty Cobb's Shoes as a Super-star (George Sisler), March 16, 1918
- If White Sox Are Beaten Out, It Will Be the Biggest Surprise in Baseball (1918 Chicago Black Sox), April 10, 1918
- Place Hitting: Ty Cobb Airs His View on Most Contested Question in Baseball (Ty Cobb), July 9, 1918
- War Conditions Give Schoolboy Phenom Early Chance With Giants (Waite Hoyt), August 19, 1918
- Cubs Lead In Box, Behind Bat and In Offensive Strength: That's Why They Should Win -- Says Purman (1918 Chicago Cubs), September 3, 1918
- Knowledge of Baseball Wins Cross for Soldier 'Over There' (Pvt. George W. Holly), September 4, 1918
- How Our Soldiers and Sailors Play the 'Rescue Relay', September 26, 1918
- How Our Soldiers Play -- The 'Human Wheelbarrow Race', October 3, 1918
- The John L. of Wrestling: Farmer Burns at 57 as Young as He Was 30 Years Ago (Farmer Burns), October 6, 1918
- How Our Soldiers and Sailors Play 'Medicine Ball Rounders', October 7, 1918
- Why He Was 'Terrible Terry': High Spots in Career of Greatest Bantam of Them All (Terry McGovern), December 18, 1918
