= 1916 Cheney Normal football team =

American college football season

1916 Cheney Normal football
- Conference: Independent
- Record: 0–3
- Head coach: Albert Fertsch (4th season)

1916 Western college football independents records
	Conf.			Overall
Team	W	L	T	W		L		T
Santa Clara		–		10	–	0	–	0
University Farm		–		6	–	1	–	1
Montana		–		4	–	1	–	1
Arizona		–		5	–	3	–	0
USC		–		5	–	3	–	0
New Mexico		–		3	–	2	–	0
Hawaii		–		3	–	2	–	1
Saint Mary's		–		5	–	4	–	1
Montana State		–		2	–	2	–	2
Nevada		–		3	–	5	–	0
Cheney Normal		–		0	–	3	–	0
Tempe Normal		–		0	–	3	–	0

The 1916 Cheney Normal football team represented the State Normal School at Cheney—now known as Eastern Washington University—as an independent during the 1916 college football season. Led by fourth-year head coach Albert Fertsch, Cheney Normal compiled a record of 0–3.

== Schedule ==
Date	Time	Opponent	Site	Result	Source
October 13		Spokane University	Cheney, WA	L 0–7	
October 20		at Whitworth	Spokane, WA	L 6–15	
November 10	2:15 p.m.	Whitworth	Cheney, WA	L 0–13	
All times are in Pacific time; Source:
