= 1916 New Mexico A&M Aggies football team =

American college football season

1916 New Mexico A&M Aggies football
- Conference: Independent
- Record: 0–4
- Head coach: Clarence W. Russell (3rd season)

1916 Western college football independents records
	Conf.			Overall
Team	W	L	T	W		L		T
Santa Clara		–		10	–	0	–	0
University Farm		–		6	–	1	–	1
Montana		–		4	–	1	–	1
Arizona		–		5	–	3	–	0
USC		–		5	–	3	–	0
New Mexico		–		3	–	2	–	0
Hawaii		–		3	–	2	–	1
Saint Mary's		–		5	–	4	–	1
Montana State		–		2	–	2	–	2
Nevada		–		3	–	5	–	0
Tempe Normal		–		0	–	3	–	0

The 1916 New Mexico A&M Aggies football team was an American football team that represented New Mexico College of Agriculture and Mechanical Arts (now known as New Mexico State University) during the 1916 college football season. In their third year under head coach Clarence W. Russell, the Aggies compiled a 0–4 record.

== Schedule ==
Date	Time	Opponent	Site	Result	Source
		New Mexico A&M alumni (exhibition)		W 27–0	
October 7		El Paso High School (exhibition)		W 20–0	
October 28	1:30 p.m.	at El Paso High School (exhibition)	High school stadium; El Paso, TX	T 7–7	
November 10		New Mexico Military		L 7–16	
November 17		at Arizona	Tucson, AZ	L 0–73	
November 25		Texas Mines	Mesilla Park, NM; (rivalry)	L 3–6	
November 30		at New Mexico	Albuquerque, NM (rivalry)	L 0–51	
