= 1916 Oregon Webfoots football team =

American college football season

1916 Oregon Webfoots football

Rose Bowl champion Northwest Conference co-champion PCC co-champion

Rose Bowl, W 14–0 vs. Penn
- Conference: Northwest Conference, Pacific Coast Conference
- Record: 7–0–1 (2–0–1 Northwest, 2–0–1 PCC)
- Head coach: Hugo Bezdek (5th season)
- Captain: John Beckett
- Home stadium: Kincaid Field

1916 Northwest Conference football standings
	Conf.					Overall
Team	W		L		T	W		L		T
Washington +	2	–	0	–	1	6	–	0	–	1
Oregon +	2	–	0	–	1	7	–	0	–	1
Oregon Agricultural	3	–	2	–	0	4	–	5	–	0
Washington State	2	–	2	–	0	4	–	2	–	0
Whitman	1	–	3	–	0	1	–	5	–	0
Idaho	0	–	3	–	0	3	–	5	–	0
+ – Conference co-champions

1916 Pacific Coast Conference football standings
	Conf.					Overall
Team	W		L		T	W		L		T
Washington +	3	–	0	–	1	6	–	0	–	1
Oregon ^ +	2	–	0	–	1	7	–	0	–	1
Oregon Agricultural	0	–	2	–	0	4	–	5	–	0
California	0	–	3	–	0	6	–	4	–	1
+ – Conference co-champions; ^ – Selected as Rose Bowl representative

The 1916 Oregon Webfoots football team represented the University of Oregon as a member of the Northwest Conference and the newly-formed Pacific Coast Conference (PCC) during the 1916 college football season. Led by fourth year head coach Hugo Bezdek, the Webfoots compiled an overall record of 7–0–1 with a victory over Penn in the Rose Bowl on New Year's Day. Oregon had a record of 2–0–1 in Northwest Conference played and 2–0–1 against PCC opponents, placing second in both conferences. The team played home games at Kincaid Field in Eugene, Oregon.

This was first Oregon football team to play to the school's "Mighty Oregon" fight song, which was first performed on January 7, 1916. In 2016 the Oregon Ducks wore Webfoot throwback jerseys in their game vs. Washington to celebrate the 100th anniversary of both the fight song and the 1916 squad.

== Schedule ==
Date	Time	Opponent	Site	Result	Attendance	Source
October 7		Willamette*	Kincaid Field; Eugene, OR	W 97–0		
October 14		Multnomah Athletic Club*	Kincaid Field; Eugene, OR	W 28–0		
October 21		at California	California Field; Berkeley, CA	W 39–14	10,000	
November 4	2:30 p.m.	Washington^{†}	Kincaid Field; Eugene, OR (rivalry)	T 0–0	5,000	
November 11		vs. Washington State	Multnomah Field; Portland, OR	W 12–3	8,000	
November 25		at Oregon Agricultural	Bell Field; Corvallis, OR (rivalry)	W 27–0	3,000	
November 30		at Multnomah Athletic Club*	Multnomah Field; Portland, OR	W 27–0		
January 1, 1917		vs. Penn*	Tournament Park; Pasadena, CA (Rose Bowl)	W 14–0	27,000	
*Non-conference game; ^{†}Homecoming; Source:

== Game summaries ==
=== Willamette ===
Willamette at Oregon – Game summary

Quarter	1	2	3	4	Total
Willamette	0	0	0	0	0
Oregon	20	28	21	28	97

at Kincaid Field • Eugene, Oregon

- Date: Saturday, October 7th, 1916
- Game weather: Temperature: • Wind: • Weather:
- Game attendance:
- Referee: Referee: Sam Dolan • Umpire: Bill Schmitt • Linesman: Dean Walker

Game information

First quarter

- ORE – Montieth 6-yard run (PAT Missed)
- ORE – Shy Huntington 1-yard run (S. Huntington Kick)
- ORE – Hollis Huntington 1-yard run (S. Huntington Kick)

Second quarter

- ORE – H. Huntington 1-yard run (S. Huntington Kick)
- ORE – S. Huntington 40-yard pass (S. Huntington Kick)
- ORE – Jensen 8-yard run (S. Huntington Kick)
- ORE – Montieth 1-yard run (S. Huntington Kick)

Third quarter

- ORE – S. Huntington 1-yard run (S. Huntington Kick)
- ORE – H. Huntington 5-yard run (S. Huntington Kick)
- ORE – Montieth 25-yard pass from S. Huntington (S. Huntington Kick)

Fourth quarter

- ORE – S. Huntington 30-yard run (S. Huntington Kick)
- ORE – S. Huntington 60–yard punt return (S. Huntington Kick)
- ORE – Tegart 5-yard pass from S. Huntington (S. Huntington Kick)
- ORE – S. Huntington 60-yard run (Montieth Kick)

In their first game of the season the Webfoots defeated the Willamette Methodists by a massive margin of 97–0.

=== Multnomah Athletic Club ===
Multnomah Athletic Club at Oregon – Game summary

Quarter	1	2	3	4	Total
Multnomah Athletic Club	0	0	0	0	0
Oregon	0	14	7	7	28

at Kincaid Field • Eugene, Oregon

- Date: Saturday, October 14th, 1916
- Game weather: Temperature: • Wind: • Weather:
- Game attendance:
- Referee: Referee: Sam Dolan • Umpire: Bill Schmitt • Linesman: Clyde Johnson

Game information

Second quarter

- ORE – Tegart 20-yard pass from Shy Huntington (S. Huntington Kick)
- ORE – Johnny Parsons 1-yard run (Montieth Kick)

Third quarter

- ORE – Tegart 15-yard pass from Shy Huntington (S. Huntington Kick)

Fourth quarter

- ORE – Mitchell 30-yard fumble recovery (S. Huntington Kick)

In their second game of the season the Webfoots defeated the Multnomah Athletic Club 28–0, recording their second shutout in as many games.

=== California ===
Oregon at California – Game summary

Quarter	1	2	3	4	Total
Oregon	13	7	13	6	39
California	7	0	0	7	14

at California Field • Berkeley, California

- Date: Saturday, October 21st, 1916
- Game weather: Temperature: • Wind: • Weather:
- Game attendance: 10,000
- Referee: Referee: Sam Dolan • Umpire: Braddock • Linesman: Adams

Game information

First quarter

- CAL – Wells 5-yard run (Montgomery Kick)
- ORE – Johnny Parsons 1-yard run (Hollis Huntington Kick)
- ORE – Shy Huntington 1-yard run (PAT Missed)

Second quarter

- ORE – S. Huntington 5-yard run (Beckett Kick)

Third quarter

- ORE – H. Huntington 1-yard run (S. Huntington Kick)
- ORE – Parsons 20-yard run (PAT Missed)

Fourth quarter

- ORE – Beckett 1-yard run (PAT Missed)
- CAL – Sharpe 1-yard run (Montgomery Kick)

In their first conference game of the season the Webfoots defeated the California Golden Bears 39–14, allowing their only two touchdowns of the season during the game.

=== Washington ===
Washington at Oregon – Game summary

Quarter	1	2	3	4	Total
Washington	0	0	0	0	0
Oregon	0	0	0	0	0

at Kincaid Field • Eugene, Oregon

- Date: Saturday, November 4th, 1916
- Game weather: Temperature: • Wind: • Weather: Heavy Rain
- Game attendance: 10,000

In their first home conference game of the season the Webfoots tied with the Washington Huskies while playing in a heavy downpour that muddied the field.

== Personnel ==
=== Depth chart ===
LE
John Beckett
McKinney

LT
Brick Mitchell
B.T. Williams

LG
W.C. Snyder
G. Dudley

LHB
Orville Montieth
Jensen

C
Jake Risley

QB
Shy Huntington
Neil Morfitt

FB
Hollis Huntington

RG
Bert Spellman
G. Dudley

RHB
Johnny Parsons
Ray Couch

RT
R.L. Tegart
B.T. Williams

RE
Ken Bartlett
C.E. Nelson
