= 1916 All-Pacific Coast football team =

American all-star college football team

The 1916 All-Pacific Coast football team consists of American football players chosen by various organizations for All-Pacific Coast teams for the 1916 college football season.

The Pacific Coast Conference (PCC) was founded on December 2, 1915, at a meeting at the Imperial Hotel in Portland, Oregon. Charter members were the University of California (now University of California, Berkeley), the University of Washington, the University of Oregon, and Oregon Agricultural College (now Oregon State University). The conference began play in 1916, and the 1916 All-Pacific Coast football team was the first all-conference team selected from players within the conference.

== All-Pacific Coast selections ==
=== Quarterback ===
- Charles A. Huntington, Oregon (AS-1; GV-1; ODJ; PS-1)
- Johnson, Washington (GV-2)

=== Halfbacks ===
- Fred T. Brooks, California (AS-1; GV-1; ODJ [tie]; PS-1)
- Elmer Noble, Washington (AS-1; ODJ [tie]; GV-2)
- Johnny Parsons, Oregon (PS-1)
- Orville Monteith, Oregon (GV-2)

=== Fullback ===
- Leroy B. Sharp, California (AS-1 [fullback]; GV-1 [halfback]; ODJ [tie-fullback])
- Ernest Murphy, Washington (GV-1; ODJ [tie]; PS-1)
- Newman, Oregon Agricultural (GV-2)

=== Ends ===
- Willis Montgomery, California (AS-1; GV-1; ODJ; PS-1)
- Brick Mitchell, Oregon (AS-1; GV-1; ODJ; PS-1)
- R. L. Tegart, Oregon (GV-2)
- Bissett, Oregon Agricultural (GV-2)

=== Tackles ===
- John Beckett, Oregon (AS-1; GV-1; ODJ; PS-1)
- Claude Monlux, California (AS-1; GV-1)
- William Grimm, Washington (AS-1; ODJ; PS-1; GV-2)
- Ken Bartlett, Oregon (GV-2)

=== Guards ===
- Elmer Snyder, Oregon (GV-1; ODJ; PS-1)
- Louis Seagrave, Washington (AS-1 [guard]; GV-1; ODJ; PS-1)
- Morrison, Washington (GV-2)
- McNeil, Oregon Agricultural (GV-2)

=== Centers ===
- Jake Risley, Oregon (AS-1; GV-1; ODJ)
- William Russell, California (PS-1; GV-2)

== Key ==
AS = Andy Smith, head coach of the University of California football team from 1916 to 1925

GV = George Varnell, Pacific Coast Conference referee residing in Spokane, who selected all-conference teams for both the Pacific Coast Conference and the Northwest Conference.

ODJ = Oregon Daily Journal, based on compiling the All-Pacific Conference teams selected by George Varnell, Spokane; Plowden Stott, L. M. Kennedy, Roscoe Fawcett, and R.A. Cronin of Portland; Andy Smith, California coach, and the Seattle Times

PS = Plowden Stott, "who officiated as umpire in a majority of the important clashes in the coast and pacific northwest circles"

== See also ==
- 1916 College Football All-America Team
