= 1917 Rose Bowl =

American college football game

1917 Tournament East-West football game
- 3rd Rose Bowl Game
Penn Quakers	Oregon Webfoots
(7–2–1)	(6–0–1)
Independent	PCC
0	14
Head coach: Bob Folwell	Head coach: Hugo Bezdek
	1	2	3	4	Total
Penn	0	0	0	0	0
Oregon	0	0	7	7	14
- Date: January 1, 1917
- Season: 1916
- Stadium: Tournament Park
- Location: Pasadena, California
- MVP: John Beckett (Oregon)
- Attendance: 27,000

The 1917 Rose Bowl, known at the time as the Tournament East-West Football Game, was a college football bowl game on Monday, January 1, 1917. It was the third Rose Bowl Game, and matched the Oregon Webfoots and the Penn Quakers. It was played at Tournament Park in Pasadena, California, a suburb northeast of Los Angeles.

Scoreless at halftime, Oregon scored a touchdown in each of the final two quarters and won 14–0. Oregon team captain John Beckett was named the Player of the Game when the award was created in 1953, with selections made retroactively. This shutout win was Oregon's sole Rose Bowl victory for 95 years, until January 2012; they made appearances in 1920, 1958, 1995, and 2010, and won again in 2015 and 2020. This was Penn's only appearance; other Ivy League teams at the Rose Bowl were Harvard in 1920 and Columbia in 1934, both winners.

Oregon and Washington were both unbeaten in the new Pacific Coast Conference that year, and tied in their head-to-head meeting. Oregon was invited to participate in the Tournament of Roses game prior to their final game, despite the fact that Washington had one more conference win than Oregon, having beaten California twice. On the basis of the extra victory, Washington is credited with having won the conference that year.

== Game summary ==
Oregon was led by the two Huntington brothers, Shy and Hollis. Following a scoreless first half, the Webfoots scored on a 15-yard pass in the 3rd quarter from Shy Huntington to Lloyd Tegert. Oregon scored again in the 4th quarter on a 1-yard run from Shy to lead the Webfoots to a 14–0 upset win. Shy Huntington also had three interceptions in the game. Oregon captain John Beckett was named MVP of the game.

=== Scoring ===
	1	2	3	4	Total
Pennsylvania	0	0	0	0	0
Oregon	0	0	7	7	14

Qtr.	Team	Scoring play	Score
3	ORE	Tegert 15-yard pass from S. Huntington, S. Huntington kick	ORE 7–0
4	ORE	S. Huntington 1 yard rush, S. Huntington kick	ORE 14–0

=== Statistics ===
Team stats	Oregon	Pennsylvania
First downs	8	13
Net Yards Rushing	198	111
Net Yards Passing	32	131
Total Yards	230	242
PC–PA–Int.	2–9–2	12–27–5
Punts-Avg.	16–35.7	10–41.8

== Game notes ==
Attendance was swelled to 25,000 when the Pasadena Tournament of Roses put up temporary grandstand seating.
