= Joseph Pipal =

American sports coach (1874–1955)

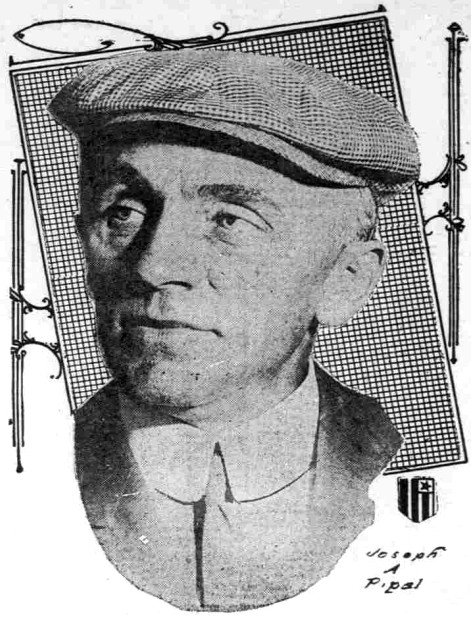

Biographical details
- Born: January 18, 1874; Zachotín, Bohemia, Austria-Hungary
- Died: August 10, 1955 (aged 81); Los Angeles, California, U.S.

Playing career

Football
- c. 1900: Beloit

Coaching career (HC unless noted)

Football
- 1902: Doane
- 1903–1904: Bellevue
- 1905: Huron
- 1907: Dickinson
- 1910: South Dakota
- 1911–1915: Occidental
- 1916–1917: Oregon Agricultural
- 1921–1923: Occidental

Basketball
- c. 1908: Dickinson
- 1910–1911: South Dakota

Baseball
- 1908: Dickinson

Track and field
- 1911–1916: Occidental
- 1916–1918: Oregon Agricultural
- 1932–1946: Occidental

Administrative career (AD unless noted)
- 1907–1909: Dickinson
- 1910–1911: South Dakota
- 1911–?: Occidental

Head coaching record
- Overall: 58–40–4 (football); 7–3 (basketball)

Accomplishments and honors

Championships
- Football; 1 SCC (1915)

Pipal decked out in school colors in front of a commercial photographer's backdrop as coach of the Oregon Agricultural College football team, 1917.

Joseph Amos Pipal (January 18, 1874 – August 10, 1955) was an American football, basketball, and track and field coach and athletics administrator. He served as the head football coach at Doane College in 1902, Bellevue College from 1903 to 1904, Huron College (later known as Huron University) in 1905, Dickinson College in 1907, the University of South Dakota in 1910, Occidental College from 1911 to 1915 and 1921 to 1923, and Oregon Agricultural College (now known as Oregon State University) from 1916 to 1917. Pipal was credited with devising lateral pass and mud cleats for football shoes. In 1934, he wrote a book titled The Lateral Pass: Technique and Strategy.

== Early life and playing career ==
Born in Zachotín, Austria-Hungary, Pipal attended Newark Academy in New Jersey before going to Beloit College in Beloit, Wisconsin, where competed in football and track and field.

== Coaching career ==
Pipal began his coaching career in 1902 as the football coach at Doane College—now known as Doane University—in Crete, Nebraska. In 1903, he went to Bellevue College in Bellevue, Nebraska as physical director, and coach of football, baseball, and track. Two years later, in 1905, he was appointed professor of physical culture at Huron College—later known as Huron University—in Huron, South Dakota.

After attending the University of Chicago, where he studied athletics under Amos Alonzo Stagg, Pipal was hired as the physical director at Dickinson College in Carlisle, Pennsylvania.

=== Oregon Agricultural ===
In 1916, Pipal took over as the head coach of Oregon State Beavers football, known then as Oregon Agricultural College. In his first season as the head coach, Pipal coached the team to a 4–5 record. This season marked the first time Oregon State played the Nebraska Cornhuskers (on October 21 in Portland, Oregon) and the first road trip to Los Angeles, California to play the USC Trojans. OAC came up short against Nebraska, 17–7, but defeated the Trojans, 16–7. Pipal's second season at OAC saw the team go 4–2–1, outscoring their opponents 83–33.

== Late life and death ==
Pipal died on August 10, 1955, of a heart attack, at his home in Los Angeles.

== Head coaching record ==
=== Football ===
| Year | Team | Overall | Conference | Standing | Bowl/playoffs |
|---|---|---|---|---|---|
Doane Tigers (Independent) (1902)
| 1902 | Doane | 2–3 | | | |
| Doane: | | 2–3 | | | |
Bellevue Redmen (Independent) (1903–1904)
| 1903 | Bellevue | 6–1–1 | | | |
| 1904 | Bellevue | 2–4 | | | |
| Bellevue: | | 8–5–1 | | | |
Dickinson Red and White (Independent) (1907)
| 1907 | Dickinson | 3–6–1 | | | |
| Dickinson: | | 2–6–1 | | | |
South Dakota Coyotes (Independent) (1910)
| 1910 | South Dakota | 5–2 | | | |
| South Dakota: | | 5–2 | | | |
Occidental Tigers (Independent) (1911–1914)
| 1911 | Occidental | 2–1 | | | |
| 1912 | Occidental | 4–1 | | | |
| 1913 | Occidental | 5–1 | | | |
| 1914 | Occidental | 4–3 | | | |
Occidental Tigers (Southern California Conference) (1915)
| 1915 | Occidental | 7–1 | 4–0 | 1st | |
Oregon Agricultural Aggies (Northwest Conference / Pacific Coast Conference) (1916–1917)
| 1916 | Oregon Agricultural | 4–5 | 3–2 / 0–2 | 3rd / 3rd | |
| 1917 | Oregon Agricultural | 4–2–1 | 2–1–1 / 1–2–1 | 2nd / 3rd | |
| Oregon Agricultural: | | 8–7–1 | 5–4–1 | | |
Occidental Tigers (Southern California Conference) (1921–1923)
| 1921 | Occidental | 2–4–1 | 2–2–1 | T–3rd | |
| 1922 | Occidental | 5–3 | 4–1 | 2nd | |
| 1923 | Occidental | 4–3 | 3–2 | 3rd | |
| Occidental: | | 33–17–1 | 13–5–1 | | |
| Total: | | 58–40–4 | | | |
National championship Conference title Conference division title or championship game berth
