= 1916 Washington football team =

American college football season

1916 Washington football

Northwest Conference co-champion PCC co-champion
- Conference: Northwest Conference, Pacific Coast Conference
- Record: 6–0–1 (2–0–1 Northwest, 3–0–1 PCC)
- Head coach: Gil Dobie (9th season)
- Captain: Louis Seagraves
- Home stadium: Denny Field

1916 Northwest Conference football standings
	Conf.					Overall
Team	W		L		T	W		L		T
Washington +	2	–	0	–	1	6	–	0	–	1
Oregon +	2	–	0	–	1	7	–	0	–	1
Oregon Agricultural	3	–	2	–	0	4	–	5	–	0
Washington State	2	–	2	–	0	4	–	2	–	0
Whitman	1	–	3	–	0	1	–	5	–	0
Idaho	0	–	3	–	0	3	–	5	–	0
+ – Conference co-champions

1916 Pacific Coast Conference football standings
	Conf.					Overall
Team	W		L		T	W		L		T
Washington +	3	–	0	–	1	6	–	0	–	1
Oregon ^ +	2	–	0	–	1	7	–	0	–	1
Oregon Agricultural	0	–	2	–	0	4	–	5	–	0
California	0	–	3	–	0	6	–	4	–	1
+ – Conference co-champions; ^ – Selected as Rose Bowl representative

The 1916 Washington football team was an American football team that represented the University of Washington as a member of the Northwest Conference and the newly-formed Pacific Coast Conference (PCC) during the 1916 college football season. In its ninth season under coach Gil Dobie, the team compiled an overall record of 6–0–1 outscored its opponents by a combined total of 189 to 16. Washington had a record of 2–0–1 in Northwest Conference play and 3–0–1 against PCC opponents, winning both conference titles. Louis Seagraves was the team captain.

Washington played to a scoreless tie with border rival Oregon at Eugene. Both ended the season undefeated, but Oregon was invited to the Rose Bowl on New Year's Day. For a second consecutive year, Washington did not play in-state rival Washington State.

== Schedule ==
Date	Time	Opponent	Site	Result	Attendance	Source
September 30		Ballard Meteors*	Denny Field; Seattle, WA	W 28–0	2,000	
October 7	3:00 p.m.	South Tacoma Athletic Club*	Denny Field; Seattle, WA	No contest	1,000	
October 14		Bremerton (Navy)*	Denny Field; Seattle, WA	W 62–0	2,000	
October 28		Whitman	Denny Field; Seattle, WA	W 37–6	3,000	
November 4	2:30 p.m.	at Oregon	Kincaid Field; Eugene, OR (rivalry)	T 0–0	5,000	
November 11		Oregon Agricultural	Denny Field; Seattle, WA	W 35–0	5,000	
November 18		at California	California Field; Berkeley, CA	W 13–3	2,000	
November 30		California	Denny Field; Seattle, WA	W 14–7	9,000	
*Non-conference game; Source:
