= Brick Mitchell =

American football player and coach

Biographical details
- Born: c. 1894
- Died: October 21, 1963 (aged 69); San Francisco, California, U.S.

Playing career
- 1915–1918: Oregon
- Position: End

Coaching career (HC unless noted)
- 1920s: San Mateo HS (CA)
- c. 1930: California (line)
- 1932–1935: Nevada

Head coaching record
- Overall: 10–20–3 (college)

Accomplishments and honors

Championships
- 2 Far Western (1932–1933)

Awards
- First-team All-PCC (1916)

Clarence Leon "Brick" Mitchell (c. 1894 – October 21, 1963) was an American football player and coach. He served as the head football coach at the University of Nevada, Reno from 1932 to 1935, compiling a record of 10–20–3. Mitchell played college football as the University of Oregon from 1915 to 1918. He was selected to the 1916 All-Pacific Coast football team as an end. Before he was hired at Nevada, Mitchell worked as a line coach under Nibs Price at the University of California, Berkeley. Mitchell coached football at San Mateo High School in San Mateo, California in the 1920s and led them to a state championship in 1926. In 1958, he was teaching mechanical drawing at Oroville High School in Oroville, California. Mitchell died at the age of 69, on October 21, 1963, at the University of California Hospital in San Francisco.

== Head coaching record ==
=== College ===
Year	Team	Overall	Conference	Standing	Bowl/playoffs
Nevada Wolf Pack (Far Western Conference) (1932–1935)
1932	Nevada	3–3–2	2–0–1	T–1st	
1933	Nevada	4–4	3–0	1st	
1934	Nevada	1–7–1	0–4–1	6th	
1935	Nevada	2–6	2–2	3rd	
Nevada:		10–20–3	7–6–2		
Total:		10–20–3			
National championship Conference title Conference division title or championship game berth
