= Clarence W. Russell =

American football, basketball, and baseball coach

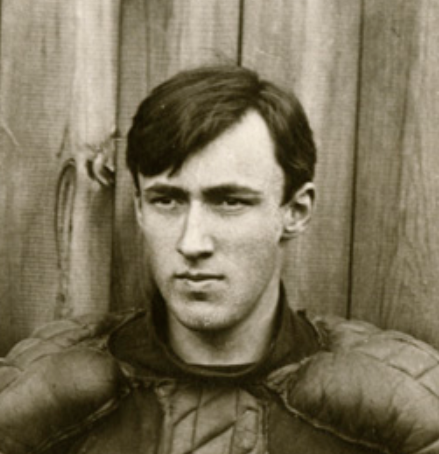
- Russell, c. 1906

Biographical details
- Born: c. 1886
- Died: February 5, 1919; Visalia, California, U.S.

Playing career

Football
- 1904–1906: Chicago

Track
- ?–1907: Chicago
- Positions: Guard, tackle (football)

Coaching career (HC unless noted)

Football
- 1907: West Virginia
- 1908: Colorado Mines
- 1914–1916: New Mexico A&M

Basketball
- 1914–1917: New Mexico A&M

Baseball
- 1915: New Mexico A&M

Administrative career (AD unless noted)
- 1914–1918: New Mexico A&M

Head coaching record
- Overall: 19–15–2 (football); 19–12 (basketball); 11–5 (baseball)

Accomplishments and honors

Championships
- National (1905)

Clarence William Russell (c. 1886 – February 5, 1919) was an American football, basketball, and baseball coach. He served as the head football coach at West Virginia University in 1907, at the Colorado School of Mines in 1908, and at New Mexico College of Agriculture and Mechanic Arts—now known as New Mexico State University—from 1914 to 1916, compiling a career college football record of 19–15–2. Russell was also the head basketball coach at New Mexico A&M from 1914 to 1917 and the school's head baseball coach in 1915.

A native of Oskaloosa, Iowa, Russell later worked for the Central California Electric company. He died from influenza, on February 5, 1919, at his home in Visalia, California.

== Head coaching record ==
=== Football ===
Year	Team	Overall	Conference	Standing	Bowl/playoffs
West Virginia Mountaineers (Independent) (1907)
1907	West Virginia	6–4			
West Virginia:		6–4			
Colorado Mines Orediggers (Independent) (1908)
1908	Colorado Mines	2–3			
Colorado Mines:		2–3			
New Mexico A&M Aggies (Independent) (1914–1916)
1914	New Mexico A&M	4–2–1			
1915	New Mexico A&M	5–2			
1916	New Mexico A&M	2–4–1			
New Mexico A&M:		11–8–2			
Total:		19–15–2			
