= Zachotín =

- Municipality
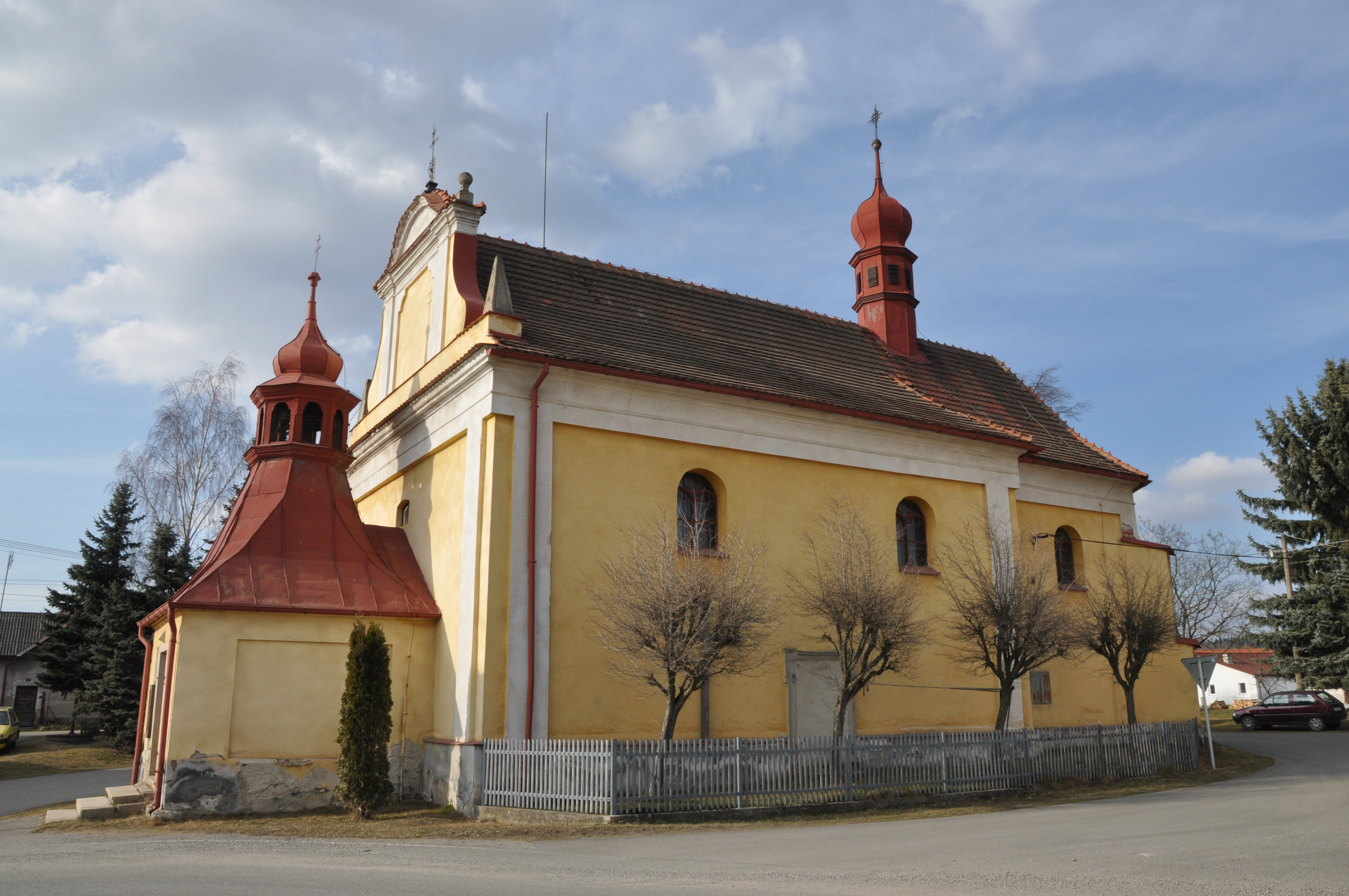
- Church of the Nativity of the Virgin Mary

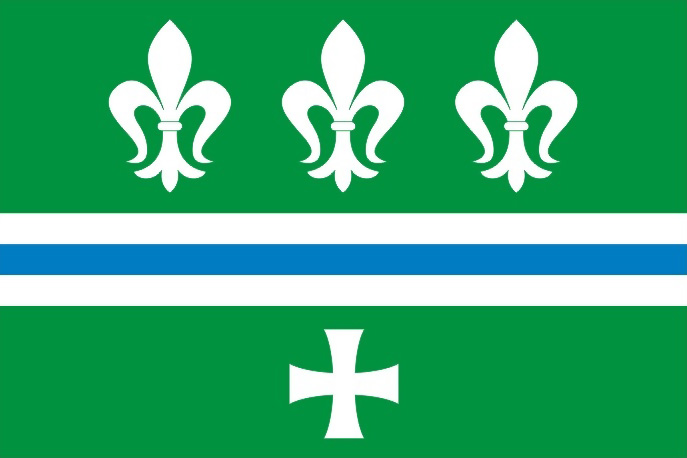
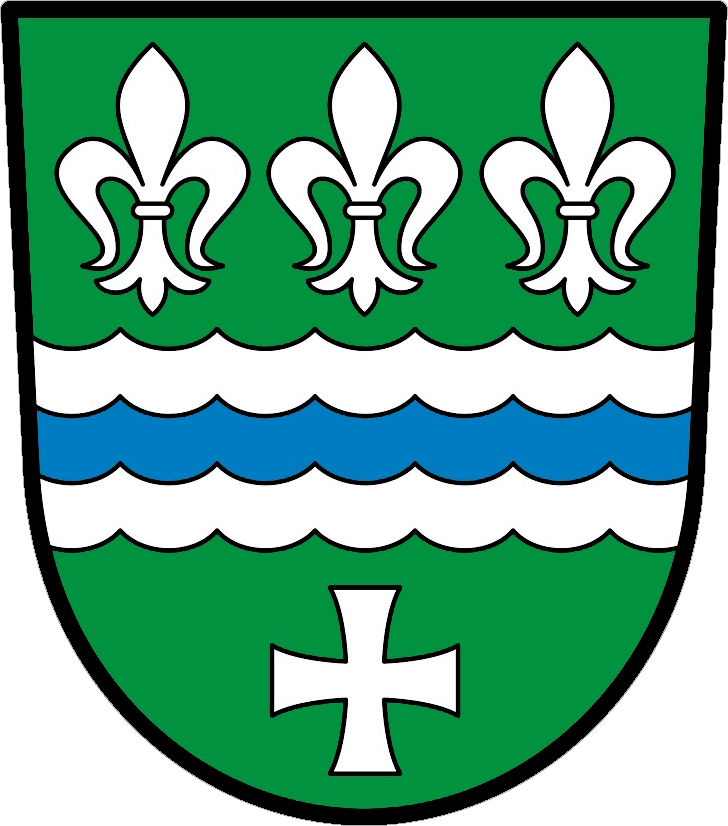
- Flag Coat of arms

- Location in the Czech Republic
- Coordinates: 49°27′45″N 15°20′53″E
- Country: Czech Republic
- Region: Vysočina
- District: Pelhřimov
- First mentioned: 1379

Area
  - Total: 10.05 km^{2} (3.88 sq mi)
- Elevation: 560 m (1,840 ft)

Population (2026-01-01)
  - Total: 228
  - Density: 22.7/km^{2} (58.8/sq mi)
- Time zone: UTC+1 (CET)
  - Summer (DST): UTC+2 (CEST)
- Postal code: 393 01
- Website: www.zachotin.cz

Zachotín is a municipality and village in Pelhřimov District in the Vysočina Region of the Czech Republic. It has about 200 inhabitants.

Zachotín lies approximately 10 kilometres (6 mi) north-east of Pelhřimov, 20 km (12 mi) north-west of Jihlava, and 96 km (60 mi) south-east of Prague.

== Administrative division ==
Zachotín consists of three municipal parts (in brackets population according to the 2021 census):

- Zachotín (171)
- Častonín (43)
- Petrkov (20)

== Demographics ==
Historical population
Year	Pop.	±%
1869	425	—
1880	434	+2.1%
1890	426	−1.8%
1900	420	−1.4%
1910	427	+1.7%
1921	435	+1.9%
1930	412	−5.3%
1950	303	−26.5%
1961	297	−2.0%
1970	258	−13.1%
1980	259	+0.4%
1991	227	−12.4%
2001	221	−2.6%
2011	232	+5.0%
2021	234	+0.9%
Source: Censuses

== Notable people ==
- Joseph Pipal (1874–1955), American football, basketball and track and field coach
