= Albert Fertsch =

American football and basketball coach

Biographical details
- Born: Germany
- Education: Washington (1910)

Coaching career (HC unless noted)

Football
- 1913–1916: Cheney Normal

Basketball
- 1912–1916: Cheney Normal

Head coaching record
- Overall: 4–9 (football); 11–2 (basketball)

Albert Fertsch was an American football and basketball coach. He served as the head football coach State Normal School at Cheney–now known as Eastern Washington University—in Cheney, Washington from 1913 to 1916, compiling a record of 4–9. Fersch was also the head basketball coach at Cheney Normal from 1912 to 1916, tallying a mark of 11–2.

Fertsch was born in Germany. He graduated from the University of Washington in 1910. After leaving Cheney, he was an administrator at the Indiana University extension in Gary—now known as Indiana University Northwest.

== Head coaching record ==
=== Football ===
Year	Team	Overall	Conference	Standing	Bowl/playoffs
Cheney Normal (Independent) (1913–1916)
1913	Cheney Normal	1–5			
1914	Cheney Normal	2–0			
1915	Cheney Normal	1–1			
1916	Cheney Normal	0–3			
Cheney Normal:		4–9			
Total:		4–9			
