= Quantico Marines Devil Dogs football =

Football program that represented the Quantico Marine Base

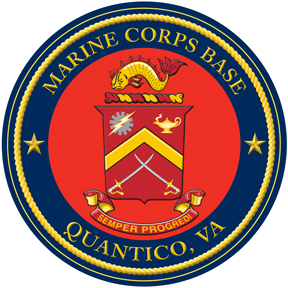
- First season: 1919
- Last season: 1972
- Location: Quantico, Virginia
- Stadium: Butler Stadium
- Colors: Scarlet and Gold
- All-time record: 339–134–15 (.710)
- Bowl record: 4–2 (.667)

National championships
- Claimed: 5 (National Service champions: 1921, 1922, 1953, 1959, 1963)

The Quantico Marines Devil Dogs football team represented the Quantico Marine Base in the sport of American football, playing 51 seasons between 1919 and 1972. Composed of United States Marine Corps personnel, many of whom had college football experience, the team competed primarily against other military teams and college teams, along with an annual game against the Baltimore City Fire Department from 1929 to 1942. The Devil Dogs registered wins against college programs such as Virginia Tech, Georgetown, Rutgers, and Villanova, and were the only team to score a touchdown against the undefeated 1923 Michigan Wolverines.

== History ==
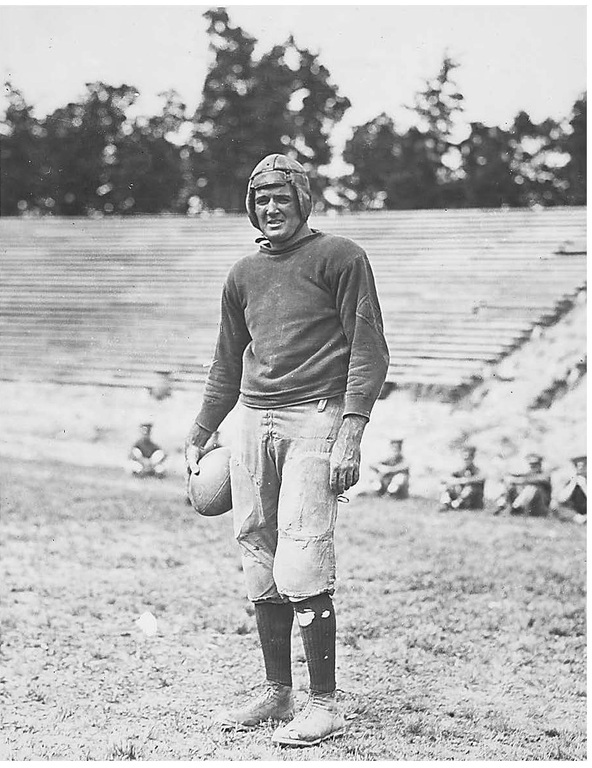
Frank Goettge

The "Devil Dogs" football program began after World War I, encouraged by Marine Corps General Smedley Butler, for whom the team's stadium was later named. Head coach Lt. John Beckett led the team to back-to-back undefeated seasons in 1921 and 1922. Before a crowd of 16,000 in Baltimore in 1921, the Marines defeated the Third Army Corps, who were coached by Major Dwight D. Eisenhower, by a score of 20–0. Frank Goettge was the backfield star of the 1921 team. Walter Camp, after seeing Goettge play against the Third Army Corps one year, (Note: Apparently 1924, per a January 1935 newspaper account.) wrote: "Today, for today at least, I saw my greatest all-time football player; for today at least greater than Jim Thorpe on a good day. The big fellow's name is Frank Goettge. He is a young Marine Lieutenant from Ohio." Goettge, who rose to the rank of lieutenant colonel, would die on Guadalcanal in 1942. The major highlights of the 1922 season were a 9–6 victory over Georgetown, an Eastern power at the time, and a 13–12 victory over Third Army Corps. The game with Third Army Corps was held in Baltimore before 50,000 fans including 12,000 Marines, the Secretaries of War and the Navy, Governors of Pennsylvania, Maryland and Virginia and 100 members of Congress. (Note: Contemporary news reports estimate the crowd at 40,000 and noted in attendance John W. Weeks (Secretary of War), Edwin Denby (Secretary of the Navy), Elbert Lee Trinkle (Governor of Virginia), and Albert Ritchie (Governor of Maryland).)

The Marines saw their winning streak end with a 6–0 loss to VMI in the 1923 season opener. Quantico would only lose one other game during the season, a 26–6 defeat at Michigan. "Support for the team reached an all-time high during a game against the University of Michigan at Ann Arbor, during the Corps’ anniversary in 1923. Thousands of Marines and fans traveled from Quantico on special trains to attend the game. Many of the Marines spent their entire month's paycheck and more just to pay for the venture." A "mixup in the official timekeeper's record" resulted in the first quarter lasting 33 minutes, thus the first half was 48 minutes long rather than a regulation 30 minutes. Despite the two losses, the 1923 team shutout six teams during the season, including a 39–0 victory over Villanova. (Note: Reported as 40–0 in contemporary newspapers.)

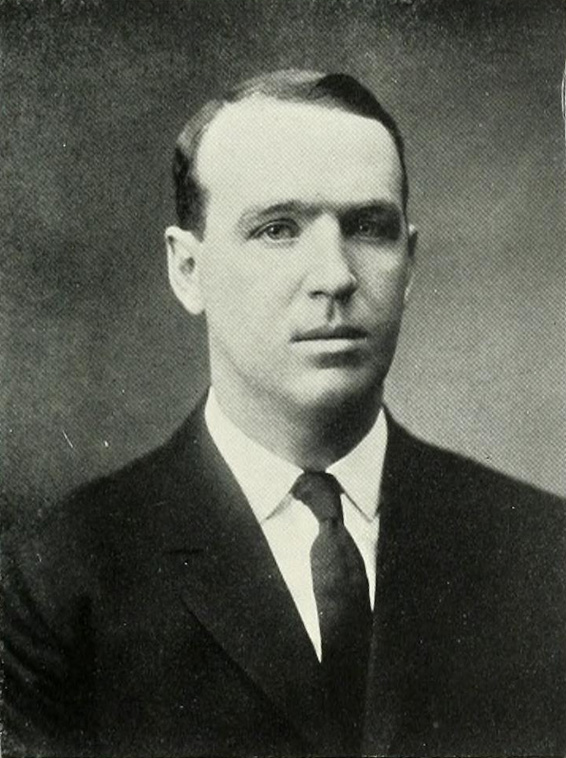
Tom Keady, head coach 1925–1930

The Marines improved in 1924, winning each of their games except for a 13–13 tie with Vanderbilt. This would prove to be Beckett's last year coaching the Marines. In four seasons, they were 30–2–2 for a .912 winning percentage. Tom Keady took over the head coaching duties for the 1925 season, but Quantico didn't fare as well, finishing with a 6–3–1 record. But Keady would return the Marines to the ranks of the undefeated, coaching the team to a 10–0 record in 1927. Keady compiled a 45–12–3 record (.775 winning percentage) as head coach from 1925 to 1930.

From 1931 through 1942, the team had multiple head coaches, with only Bill Beatty serving as head coach for more than a single season, in 1935 and 1936. Statistically, the best season of this era was 1934, when the team was 7–1, losing only to the Sewanee Athletic Club. Due to World War II, no team was fielded during 1943–1945. When competition resumed in 1946, the team went 3–8 while playing mainly against other military teams. In 1947, the team improved to 12–1 while again playing mostly against military teams, losing only to Washington and Lee in the first game of the season.

The Marines had another undefeated season in 1948 (13–0), including shutouts over eight teams. A 27-game winning streak would end in 1949, with a 29–7 loss to Xavier. Xavier would win a 34–13 rematch in 1950, but one highlight of the season was a 61–21 win over the VPI Gobblers (now known as the Virginia Tech Hokies) with the Devil Dogs led by Eddie LeBaron at quarterback. The 1956 squad would not only beat Xavier (27–13), but also Boston College (20–6), en route to a 9–3 record. The 1958 Marines pulled off an upset of #19 Rutgers, 13–12, handing the 9-0 Scarlet Knights their first loss of the season. It was the only official victory against an AP-ranked college football opponent in Quantico history. Coach Capt. Will Overgaard led the Marines to an 11–0 record in 1959, the last undefeated season for Quantico. The 1962 season would see five games canceled because of the Cuban Missile Crisis, and two games were canceled in 1963 because of the assassination of President Kennedy. In the 1965 season finale at Butler Stadium, Quantico (a two-touchdown underdog) pulled off an upset of Memphis State, 20–14.

For the 1971-72 seasons, the Marines would change their uniform colors to navy blue, light blue, and scarlet. In 1972, Quantico would play their last season of football, under head coach Ron Eckert. The Marines beat Akron (24–0) late in the season, and Xavier (34–0) in the season finale to finish with an 8–4 record. The program was discontinued by General Robert E. Cushman, Commandant of the Marine Corps, who stated that "continued personnel and financial support for football could not be justified" due to rising costs.

== Yearly records ==
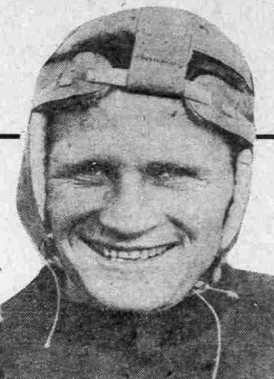
John Beckett, head coach 1921–1924

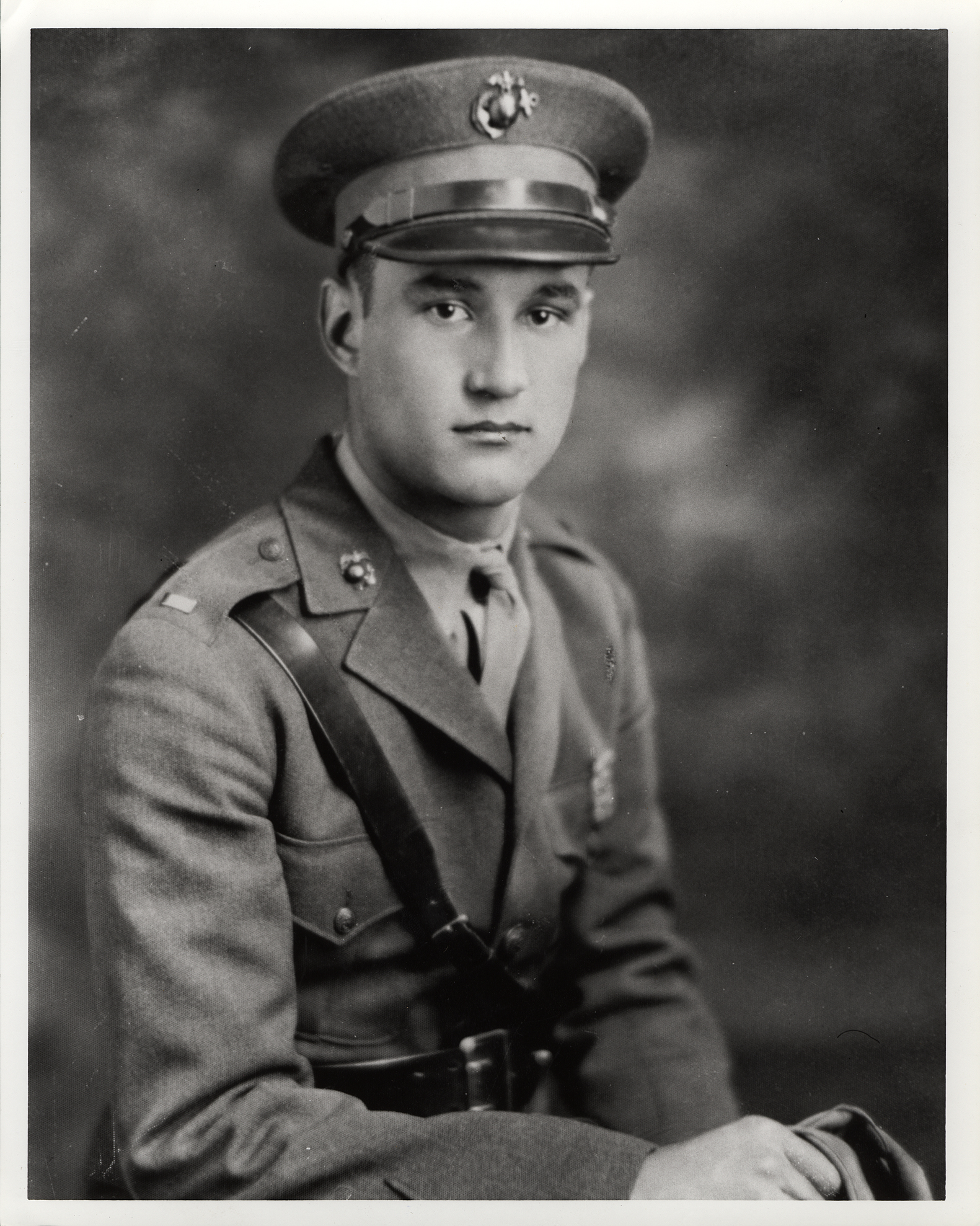
Harold W. Bauer, 1937 head coach; Medal of Honor recipient

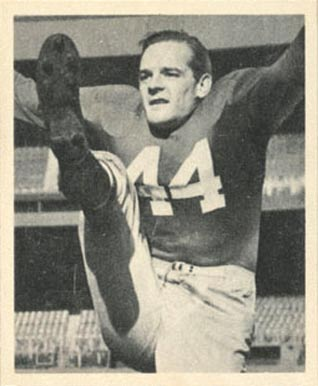
Frank Reagan, 1942 co-head coach

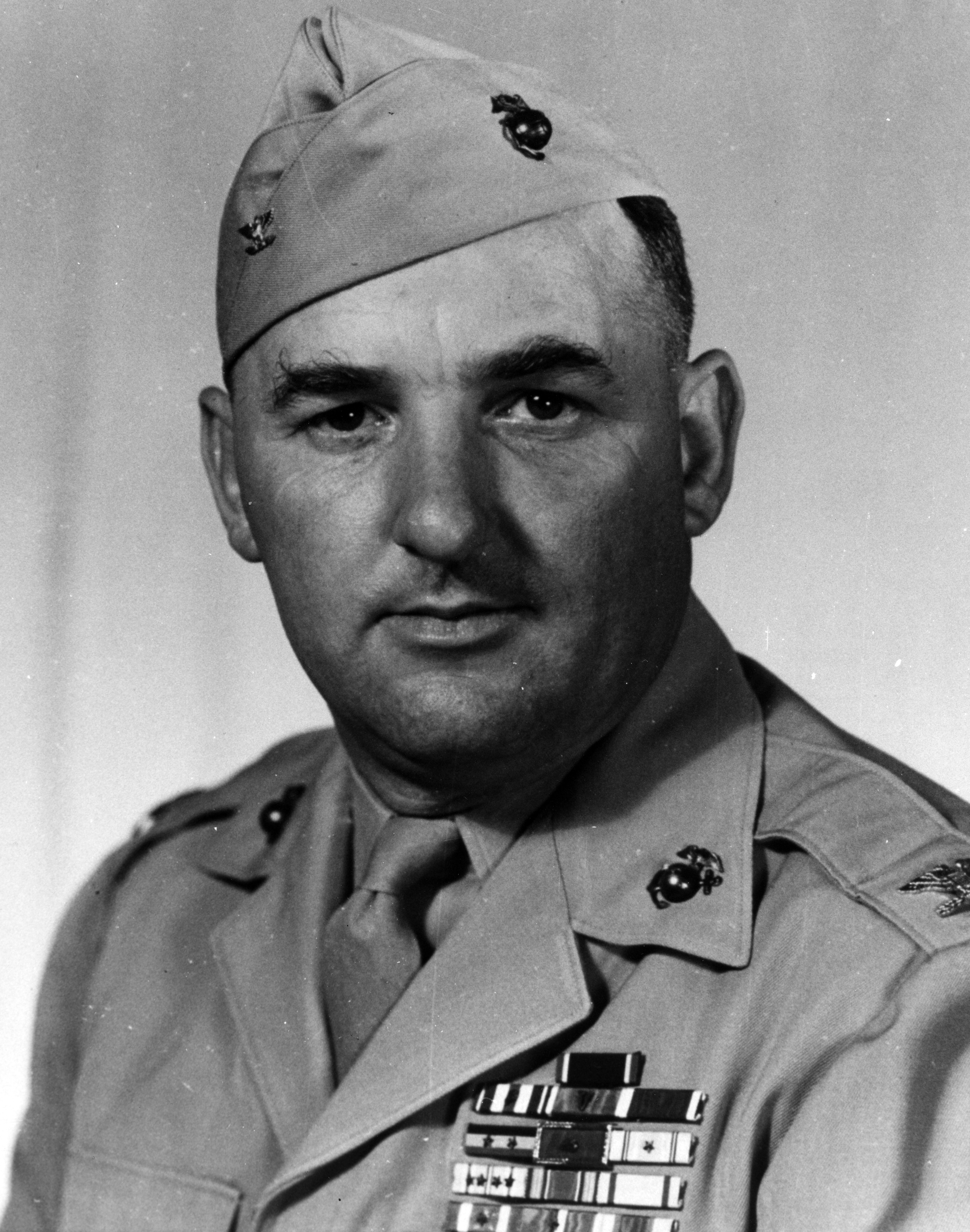
Austin Shofner, 1946 head coach

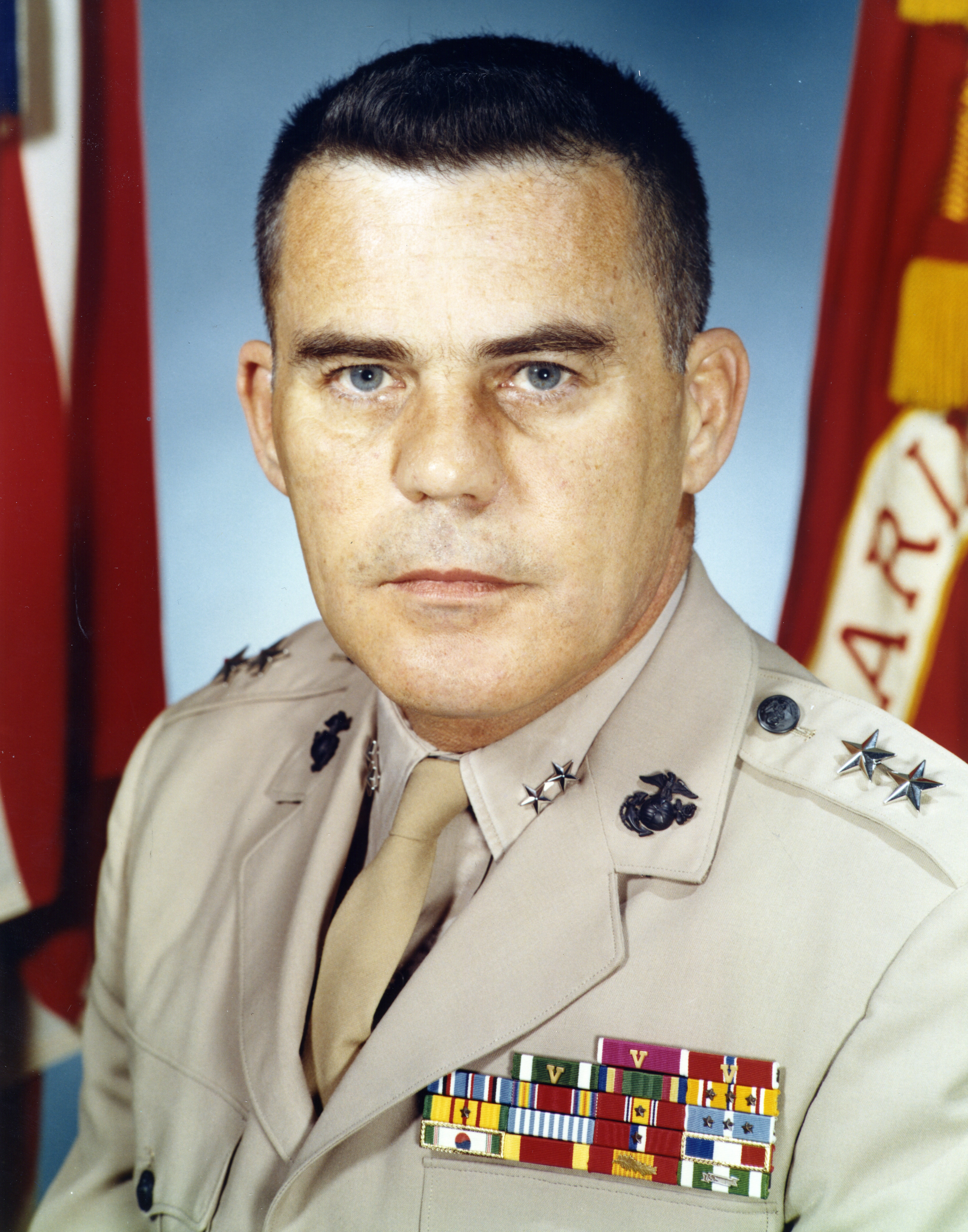
William C. Chip, 1949-1950 Assistant head coach

Season	Won	Lost	Tied	Head coach
1919	2	0	–	Dutch Molthen
1920	1	1	–	unknown
1921	8	0	–	John Beckett
1922	8	0	–	John Beckett
1923	7	2	1	John Beckett
1924	7	0	1	John Beckett
1925	6	3	1	Tom Keady
1926	10	3	–	Tom Keady
1927	10	0	–	Tom Keady
1928	8	1	1	Tom Keady
1929	5	3	–	Tom Keady
1930	6	2	1	Tom Keady
1931	8	3	1	George McHenry
1932	7	3	1	Horace Palmer
1933	1	0	–	unknown
1934	7	1	–	O. K. Pressley & E. B. Camey
1935	5	2	1	Bill Beatty
1936	5	5	2	Bill Beatty
1937	0	1	–	Harold W. Bauer
1938	3	3	–	Mark Boswell
1939	5	1	–	C. E. Emrich
1940	7	2	–	Alvin Sanders & Milton Rogers
1941	4	3	–	Joe Missar
1942	4	0	–	M. J. Kelly & Frank Reagan
1943	cancelled			
1944	cancelled			
1945	cancelled			
1946	3	8	–	Austin Shofner
1947	12	1	–	Marvin Stewart
1948	13	0	–	Hal Harwood
1949	11	3	–	Hal Harwood
1950	9	2	–	Hal Harwood
1951	5	6	–	Bill Justice
1952	8	3	–	Charles Walker
1953	10	3	–	Charles Walker
1954	10	2	–	J. T. Hill
1955	8	3	–	J. T. Hill
1956	9	3	–	Hal Harwood
1957	3	9	1	Hal Harwood
1958	9	3	1	Hal Harwood
1959	11	0	–	Will Overgaard
1960	9	2	–	Will Overgaard
1961	9	4	–	Will Overgaard
1962	5	2	–	Jim Quinn
1963	10	1	–	Jim Quinn
1964	2	6	1	Vern Ellison
1965	6	4	–	Joe Caprara
1966	5	2	2	Ron Cherubini
1967	2	8	–	Frank Marcus
1968	4	7	–	King Dixon
1969	9	2	–	Ed Heuring
1970	6	4	–	Ed Heuring
1971	9	3	–	Ron Eckert
1972	8	4	–	Ron Eckert
Total	339	134	15	

== Military titles ==
Season	Record	Head coach	Title(s)
1921	8–0	John Beckett	National Service champions
1922	8–0	John Beckett	National Service champions
1947	12–1	Marvin Stewart	All-Navy title; Middle Eastern Service Conference title
1948	13–0	Hal Harwood	All-Navy title
1949	11–3	Hal Harwood	All-Navy title
1953	10–3	Charles Walker	All-Marine title; National Service champions
1959	11–0	Will Overgaard	National Service champions
1963	10–1	Jim Quinn	National Service champions

== Military bowl games ==
The Devil Dogs are known to have participated in six military bowl games, with a record of 4–2.

Date	Bowl	Site	Opponent	Result	PF	PA	Ref.
December 19, 1953	Poinsettia Bowl	San Diego, California	Fort Ord	L	19	55	
December 13, 1959	Shrimp Bowl	Galveston, Texas	McClellan AFB	W	90	0	
December 3, 1960	Missile Bowl	Orlando, Florida	Pensacola NAS	W	36	6	
December 11, 1960	Leatherneck Bowl	San Diego, California	San Diego Marines	W	36	6	
December 9, 1961	Missile Bowl	Orlando, Florida	Fort Eustis	L	24	25	
December 14, 1963	Missile Bowl	Orlando, Florida	San Diego Marines	W	13	10	

== Notable personnel ==
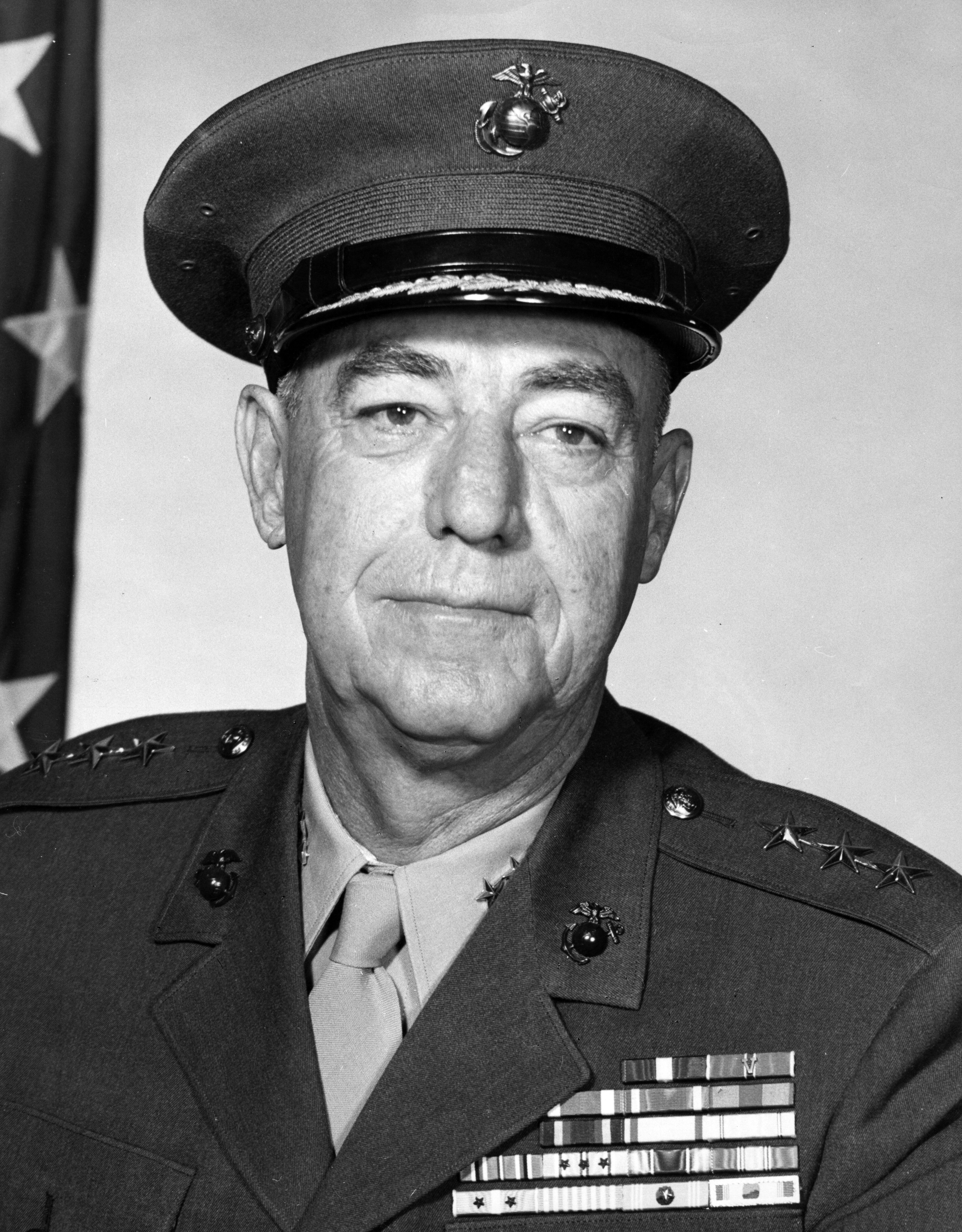
Joseph C. Burger

Multiple players and coaches with the team ultimately became general officers in the Marine Corps, including:

- Chester R. Allen (tackle 1930)
- Caleb Bailey (center 1923–1926; assistant coach 1928–1929)
- Joseph C. Burger (tackle 1925–1926, 1931; assistant coach 1928, 1931–1932)
- William S. Fellers (back 1922–1923)
- Mike Giddings (guard 1955)
- Harry B. Liversedge (end 1920; tackle 1921–1924; assistant coach 1925–1926, 1929)
- J. D. Roberts (guard 1955, assistant coach 1956)
- George R. E. Shell (end 1932; athletic officer 1937)
- Austin Shofner (head coach 1946)
- William J. Whaling (end 1922–1923)
- Frederick L. Wieseman (assistant coach 1936)
