= 1916 Oregon Agricultural Aggies football team =

American college football season

1916 Oregon Agricultural Aggies football
- Conference: Northwest Conference, Pacific Coast Conference
- Record: 4–5 (3–2 Northwest, 0–2 PCC)
- Head coach: Joseph Pipal (1st season)
- Captain: Lee Bissett
- Home stadium: Bell Field

1916 Northwest Conference football standings
	Conf.					Overall
Team	W		L		T	W		L		T
Washington +	2	–	0	–	1	6	–	0	–	1
Oregon +	2	–	0	–	1	7	–	0	–	1
Oregon Agricultural	3	–	2	–	0	4	–	5	–	0
Washington State	2	–	2	–	0	4	–	2	–	0
Whitman	1	–	3	–	0	1	–	5	–	0
Idaho	0	–	3	–	0	3	–	5	–	0
+ – Conference co-champions

1916 Pacific Coast Conference football standings
	Conf.					Overall
Team	W		L		T	W		L		T
Washington +	3	–	0	–	1	6	–	0	–	1
Oregon ^ +	2	–	0	–	1	7	–	0	–	1
Oregon Agricultural	0	–	2	–	0	4	–	5	–	0
California	0	–	3	–	0	6	–	4	–	1
+ – Conference co-champions; ^ – Selected as Rose Bowl representative

The 1916 Oregon Agricultural Aggies football team represented Oregon Agricultural College (OAC)—now known as Oregon State University as a member of the Northwest Conference and the Pacific Coast Conference (PCC) during the 1916 college football season.

In their first season under head coach Joseph Pipal, the Aggies compiled an overall record of 4–5 and were outscored by their opponents by a combined total of 112 to 92. Oregon Agricultural had a record of 3–2 in Northwest Conference play, placing third, and 0–2 against PCC opponents, finishing third. The team — known simultaneously as the "Aggies" and the "Beavers" during this era — played its home games at Bell Field in Corvallis, Oregon.

== Schedule ==
Date	Opponent	Site	Result	Attendance	Source
September 23	O.A.C. alumni*	Bell Field; Corvallis, OR	L 7–13		
September 30	Multnomah Athletic Club*	Bell Field; Corvallis, OR	L 0–3		
October 7	at Idaho	MacLean Field; Moscow, ID	W 26–0		
October 14	at Washington State	Rogers Field; Pullman, WA	W 13–10		
October 21	Nebraska*	Multnomah Field; Portland, OR	L 7–17		
November 4	Whitman	Bell Field; Corvallis, OR	W 23–0		
November 11	at Washington	Denny Field; Seattle, WA	L 0–35	5,000	
November 25	Oregon	Bell Field; Corvallis, OR (rivalry)	L 0–27	3,000	
November 30	at USC*	Fiesta Park; Los Angeles, CA	W 16–7	5,000	
*Non-conference game; Source:

== Roster ==
Published roster of the OAC Beavers football team ahead of the November 25 game against Oregon.
