= 1916 Washington State football team =

American college football season

1916 Washington State football
- Conference: Northwest Conference
- Record: 4–2 (2–2 Northwest)
- Head coach: William Henry Dietz (2nd season)
- Offensive scheme: Single-wing
- Captain: Benton Bangs
- Home stadium: Rogers Field

1916 Northwest Conference football standings
	Conf.					Overall
Team	W		L		T	W		L		T
Washington +	2	–	0	–	1	6	–	0	–	1
Oregon +	2	–	0	–	1	7	–	0	–	1
Oregon Agricultural	3	–	2	–	0	4	–	5	–	0
Washington State	2	–	2	–	0	4	–	2	–	0
Whitman	1	–	3	–	0	1	–	5	–	0
Idaho	0	–	3	–	0	3	–	5	–	0
+ – Conference co-champions

The 1916 Washington State football team represented Washington State College—now known as Washington State University—as a member of the Northwest Conference during the 1916 college football season. Led by second-year head coach William Henry Dietz, compiling an overall record of 4–2 with a mark of 2–2 in conference play, placing fourth in the Northwest Conference. The team played home games at Rogers Field, on campus in Pullman, Washington.

Washington State joined the Pacific Coast Conference (PCC) the following season, in the conference second year of competition.

== Schedule ==
Date	Opponent	Site	Result	Attendance	Source
October 14	Oregon Agricultural	Rogers Field; Pullman, WA	L 10–13		
October 28	at Montana*	Dornblaser Field; Missoula, MT	W 27–0		
November 4	Idaho^{†}	Rogers Field; Pullman, WA (rivalry)	W 31–0	2,500	
November 11	at Oregon	Multnomah Field; Portland, OR	L 3–12	8,000	
November 25	at Gonzaga*	Spokane Fairgrounds; Spokane, WA	W 18–0		
November 30	at Whitman	Ankeny Field; Walla Walla, WA	W 46–0		
*Non-conference game; ^{†}Homecoming
