= Missile Bowl =

- Stadium: Tangerine Bowl
- Location: Orlando, Florida
- Operated: 1960–1964

The Missile Bowl was an annual American football bowl game held in Orlando, Florida, from 1960 to 1964. The game matched two of the top military service football teams.

The bowl was conceived by Arnold Stevens of the Glenn L. Martin Company in Orlando. At the first game in 1960, the organizers included a display outside the stadium featuring "the latest in missile warfare" including two of the Martin Company's products, the "Bullpup" and Lacrosse missiles. The game was canceled in 1965 due to a lack of teams caused by the Vietnam War.

== All-time scores ==
Date played	Winning team		Losing team		Reference
December 3, 1960	Quantico Marines	36	Pensacola NAS	6	
December 9, 1961	Fort Eustis	25	Quantico Marines	24	
December 15, 1962	Fort Campbell	14	Lackland AFB	10	
December 14, 1963	Quantico Marines	13	San Diego Marines	10	
December 5, 1964	Fort Benning	9	Fort Eustis	3	
