= 1916 Idaho football team =

American college football season

1916 Idaho football
- Conference: Northwest Conference
- Record: 3–5 (0–3 Northwest)
- Head coach: Wilfred C. Bleamaster (1st season)
- Home stadium: MacLean Field

1916 Northwest Conference football standings
| | Conf. | | | | | Overall |
| Team | W | | L | | T | W | | L | | T |
|---|---|---|---|---|---|---|---|---|---|---|
| Washington + | 2 | – | 0 | – | 1 | 6 | – | 0 | – | 1 |
| Oregon + | 2 | – | 0 | – | 1 | 7 | – | 0 | – | 1 |
| Oregon Agricultural | 3 | – | 2 | – | 0 | 4 | – | 5 | – | 0 |
| Washington State | 2 | – | 2 | – | 0 | 4 | – | 2 | – | 0 |
| Whitman | 1 | – | 3 | – | 0 | 1 | – | 5 | – | 0 |
| Idaho | 0 | – | 3 | – | 0 | 3 | – | 5 | – | 0 |
+ – Conference co-champions

The 1916 Idaho football team represented the University of Idaho as a member of the Northwest Conference during the 1916 college football season. Led by first-year head coach Wilfred C. Bleamaster, Idaho compiled an overall record of 3–5 with a mark of 0–3 in conference play, placing last out of six teams in the Northwest Conference. The team played three home games at MacLean Field, on campus in Moscow, Idaho.

Idaho dropped a third consecutive shutout to Washington State in the Battle of the Palouse, falling 0–31 at Rogers Field in Pullman. Seven years later, the Vandals won the first of three consecutive, their only three-peat in the rivalry series. Idaho opened with five losses before closing the season with three wins on the road in six days.

== Schedule ==
| Date | Opponent | Site | Result | Source |
|---|---|---|---|---|
| October 7 | Oregon Agricultural | MacLean Field; Moscow, ID | L 0–26 | |
| October 14 | Gonzaga* | MacLean Field; Moscow, ID (rivalry) | L 6–21 | |
| October 20 | at Whitman | Walla Walla, WA | L 14–26 | |
| November 4 | at Washington State | Rogers Field; Pullman, WA (Battle of the Palouse) | L 0–31 | |
| November 18 | Montana* | MacLean Field; Moscow, ID (rivalry) | L 13–20 | |
| November 25 | vs. Albion Normal* | Burley, ID | W 39–0 | |
| November 27 | at Idaho Technical* | Pocatello, ID (rivalry) | W 32–0 | |
| November 30 | at Utah Agricultural* | Adams Field; Logan, UT | W 27–15 | |
*Non-conference game
