= John Beckett (American football) =

American football player and coach (1892–1981)

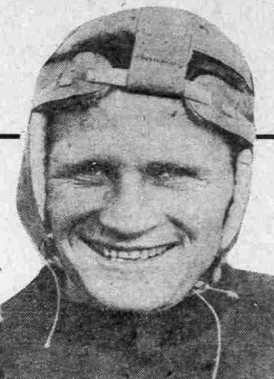

Biographical details
- Born: January 5, 1892; Eightmile, Oregon, U.S.
- Died: July 26, 1981 (aged 89); La Jolla, California, U.S.

Playing career
- 1913–1916: Oregon
- 1917: Mare Island Marines
- 1920: Buffalo All-Americans
- 1922: Columbus Panhandles
- Positions: Tackle, halfback

Coaching career (HC unless noted)
- 1920: Mare Island Marines
- 1921–1924: Quantico Marines
- 1925: San Diego Marines
- 1926–1928: Navy (assistant)
- 1931–1932: San Diego Marines

Head coaching record
- Overall: 56–19–3

Accomplishments and honors

Awards
- First-team All-PCC (1916); First-team All-Service (1917); MVP of 1917 Rose Bowl
- College Football Hall of Fame; Inducted in 1972 (profile)

John Wesley Beckett (January 5, 1892 – July 26, 1981) was an American football player and coach and United States Marine Corps officer. He played college football as a tackle at University of Oregon and for the Mare Island Marines. Beckett was inducted into the College Football Hall of Fame as a player in 1972.

== Early life ==
Born in rural northeastern Oregon, Beckett attended Eugene High School in Eugene before enrolling at the University of Oregon.

== University of Oregon ==
Although primarily used as an tackle, Beckett excelled at several positions, occasionally playing halfback and punter. Beckett was the team captain in his senior year of 1916 and was named to the all-Pacific Coast Conference team. He led the team to an undefeated record and tie for the conference championship with the University of Washington. Oregon was chosen to represent the conference in the 1917 Rose Bowl where they defeated Pennsylvania, 14–0, with Beckett later named the game's most valuable player. Beckett stood 6 feet 1 inch (1.85 m) and weighed 191 pounds (87 kg).

== U.S. Marine Corps service ==
With the United States' entry in World War I, Beckett joined the Marines in his senior year, and was assigned to the Marine base at Mare Island Naval Shipyard in Vallejo, California. He joined the Mare Island football team, coached by Beckett's Oregon coach Hugo Bezdek, and was selected as team captain. With the U.S. at war, the 1918 Rose Bowl featured two service teams: Beckett's Mare Island team and the U.S. Army's Camp Lewis team, with Mare Island winning, 19–7. Beckett is the only person to have been the captain of two different Rose Bowl teams.

Beckett served 50 years in the Marines, coaching Marine teams at Mare Island, Quantico, and San Diego, amassing an overall coaching record of 56–19–3. He achieved a final rank of brigadier general.

== Professional career ==
Beckett also spent two seasons in the National Football League (NFL) with the Buffalo All-Americans and Columbus Panhandles.

== Legacy ==
Beckett was named to the College Football Hall of Fame in 1972, and was a charter member of both the University of Oregon Athletic Hall of Fame in 1992, and the Oregon Sports Hall of Fame in 1980. He died in La Jolla, California, in 1981.

== Head coaching record ==
Year	Team	Overall	Conference	Standing	Bowl/playoffs
Mare Island Marines (Independent) (1920)
1920	Mare Island Marines				
Quantico Marines Devil Dogs (Independent) (1921–1924)
1921	Quantico Marines	8–0			National Service champions
1922	Quantico Marines	8–0			National Service champions
1923	Quantico Marines	7–2–1			
1923	Quantico Marines	7–0–1			
Quantico Marines:		30–2–2			
San Diego Marines (Independent) (1925)
1925	San Diego Marines				
San Diego Marines Devil Dogs (Independent) (1931–1932)
1931	San Diego Marines	6–4			
1932	San Diego Marines	4–6			
Total:		56–19–3			
National championship Conference title Conference division title or championship game berth
