= Charles A. Huntington =

American football player and coach

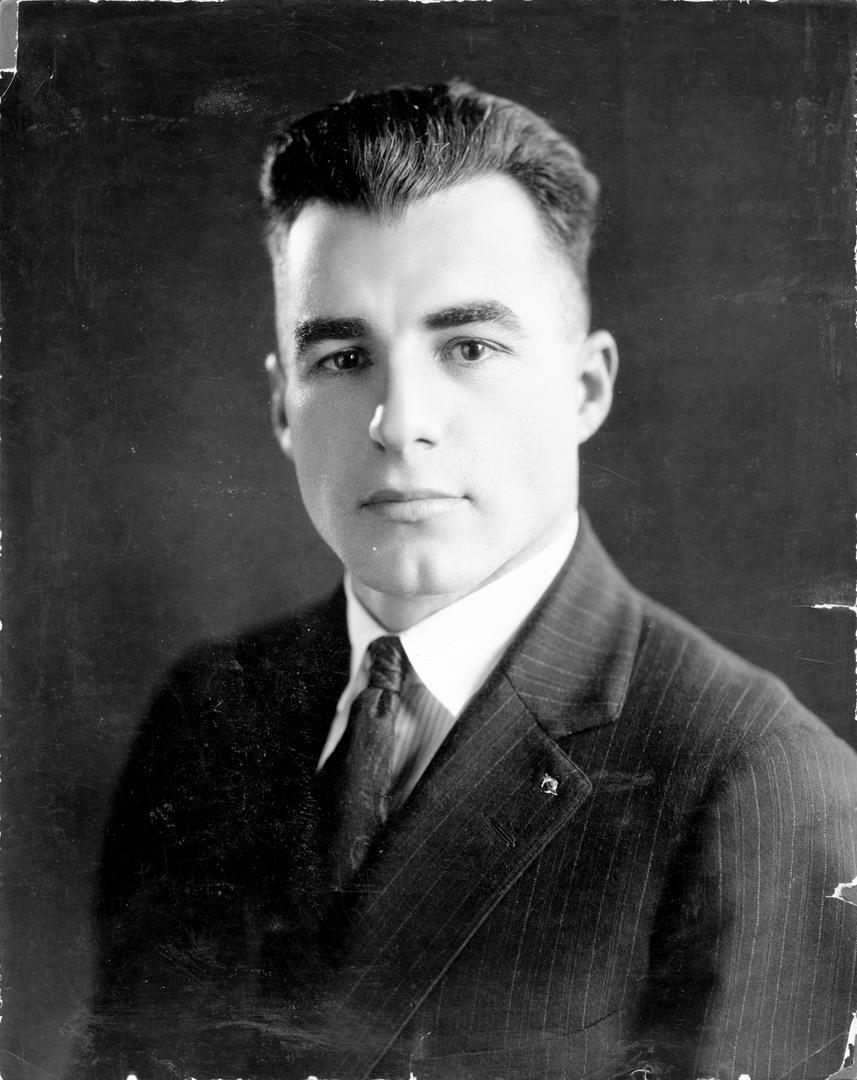

Biographical details
- Born: July 7, 1891; The Dalles, Oregon, U.S.
- Died: January 21, 1973 (aged 81); Eugene, Oregon, U.S.

Playing career

Football
- 1914–1916: Oregon
- Position: Quarterback

Coaching career (HC unless noted)

Football
- 1918–1923: Oregon

Basketball
- 1919–1920: Oregon

Baseball
- 1919–1920: Oregon

Head coaching record
- Overall: 26–12–6 (football); 8–9 (basketball); 12–15 (baseball)
- Bowls: 0–1

Accomplishments and honors

Championships
- Football; PCC (1919); 1 Northwest Conference (1922)

Awards
- First-team All-PCC (1916)

Charles A. "Shy" Huntington (July 7, 1891 – January 1973) was a quarterback and later a multi-sport coach at the University of Oregon.

== Playing and coaching career ==
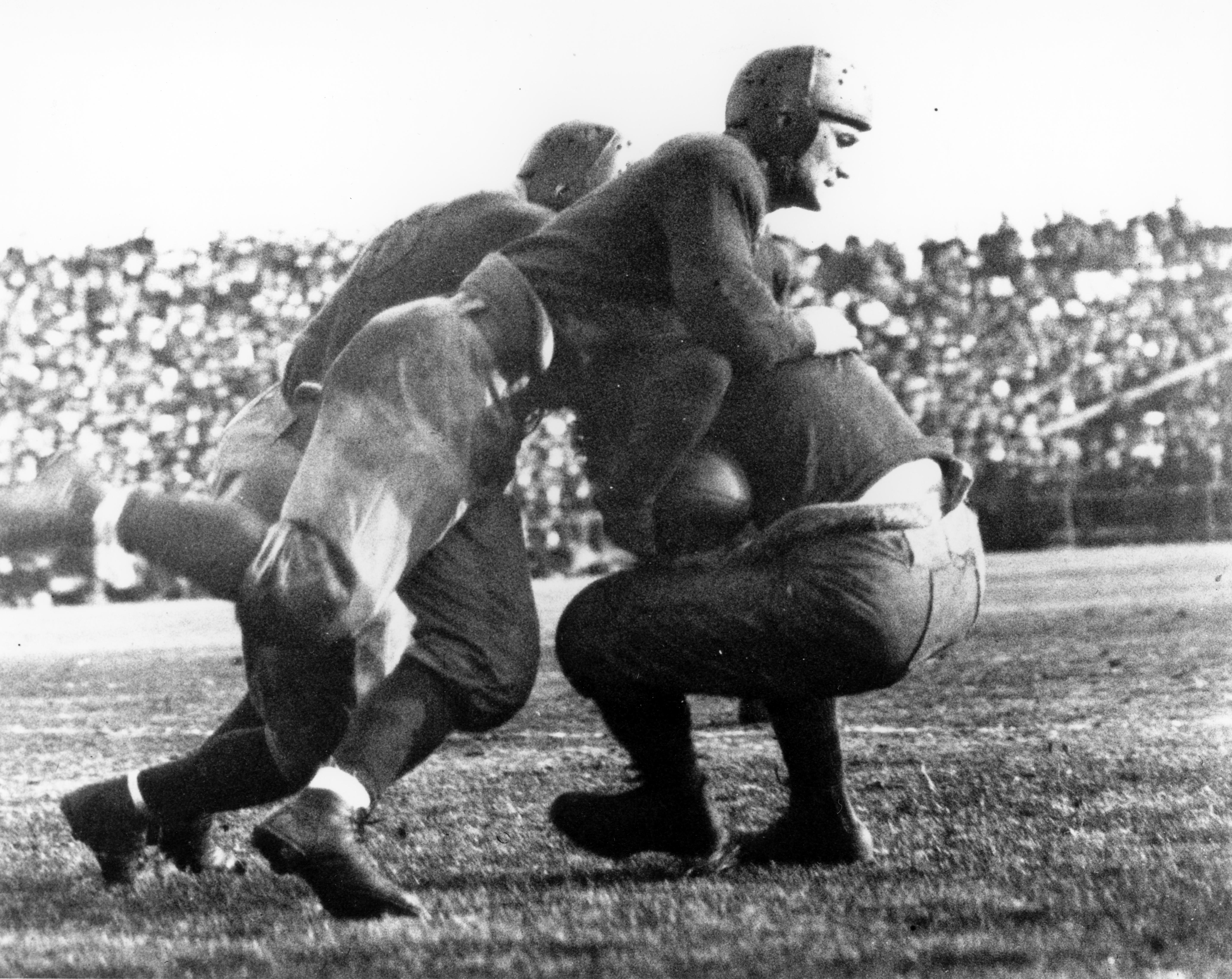
Huntington tackled by Pennsylvania defenders during the 1917 Rose Bowl.

Huntington began his football career as a quarterback and safety at the University of Oregon. He was the critical player in Oregon's Rose Bowl upset over heavily favored Pennsylvania in 1917, throwing a touchdown pass and intercepting three passes on defense as the Ducks won 14–0.

Huntington took over as head coach for the Ducks in 1918. He would coach the Ducks for six seasons. He finished with a 26–12–6 record. In 1919, he coached the Ducks to a Rose Bowl berth; they lost to Harvard, 7–6, on January 1, 1920.

He served as Oregon's baseball coach in 1919 and 1920, and he coached the basketball team for one season, 1919–20, achieving a record of eight wins and nine losses.

Huntington was a member of the Ku Klux Klan during his time as head coach.

== Political career ==
In 1932, Huntington was elected to one term in the Oregon House of Representatives, as a Republican representing Eugene.

== Head coaching record ==
=== Football ===
| Year | Team | Overall | Conference | Standing | Bowl/playoffs |
|---|---|---|---|---|---|
Oregon Webfoots (Northwest Conference / Pacific Coast Conference) (1918–1923)
| 1918 | Oregon | 4–2 | NA / 2–1 | NA / 2nd | |
| 1919 | Oregon | 5–2 | 2–1 / 2–1 | 2nd / T–1st | L Rose |
| 1920 | Oregon | 3–2–1 | 1–0–1 / 1–1–1 | 2nd / T–3rd | |
| 1921 | Oregon | 5–1–3 | 1–0–3 / 0–1–2 | 3rd / 5th | |
| 1922 | Oregon | 6–1–1 | 5–0–1 / 3–0–1 | T–1st / 2nd | |
| 1923 | Oregon | 3–4–1 | 3–3–1 / 0–4–1 | T–3rd / 8th | |
| Oregon: | | 26–12–6 | 16–8–6 | | |
| Total: | | 26–12–6 | | | |
National championship Conference title Conference division title or championship game berth
