= 1916 Arizona Wildcats football team =

American college football season

1916 Arizona Wildcats football
- Conference: Independent
- Record: 5–3
- Head coach: Pop McKale (3rd season)
- Captain: James William Hendry

1916 Western college football independents records
	Conf.			Overall
Team	W	L	T	W		L		T
Santa Clara		–		10	–	0	–	0
University Farm		–		6	–	1	–	1
Montana		–		4	–	1	–	1
Arizona		–		5	–	3	–	0
USC		–		5	–	3	–	0
New Mexico		–		3	–	2	–	0
Hawaii		–		3	–	2	–	1
Saint Mary's		–		5	–	4	–	1
Montana State		–		2	–	2	–	2
Nevada		–		3	–	5	–	0
Tempe Normal		–		0	–	3	–	0

The 1916 Arizona Wildcats football team represented the University of Arizona as an independent during the 1916 college football season. In its third season under head coach Pop McKale, the team compiled a 5–3 record and outscored all opponents by a total of 247 to 93. The team captain was James William Hendry.

== Schedule ==
Date	Opponent	Site	Result	Attendance	Source
October 7	at Douglas YMCA	Douglas, AZ	W 16–0		
October 21	at Whittier	Hadley Field; Whittier, CA	L 10–26		
	22nd Infantry	Tucson, AZ	W 29–0		
November 4	Texas Mines	Tucson, AZ	W 41–0		
November 11	Phoenix Indian School	Arizona field; Tucson, AZ	W 55–0		
November 17	New Mexico A&M	Tucson, AZ	W 73–0		
November 30	at Rice	Rice Field; Houston, TX	L 16–47		
December 9	vs. USC	Phoenix Indian School; Phoenix, AZ	L 7–20	5,000	
