= 1916 Nevada Sagebrushers football team =

American college football season

1916 Nevada Sagebrushers football
- Conference: Independent
- Record: 3–5
- Head coach: Jack Glascock (2nd season)
- Home stadium: Mackay Field

1916 Western college football independents records
	Conf.			Overall
Team	W	L	T	W		L		T
Santa Clara		–		10	–	0	–	0
University Farm		–		6	–	1	–	1
Montana		–		4	–	1	–	1
Arizona		–		5	–	3	–	0
USC		–		5	–	3	–	0
New Mexico		–		3	–	2	–	0
Hawaii		–		3	–	2	–	1
Saint Mary's		–		5	–	4	–	1
Montana State		–		2	–	2	–	2
Nevada		–		3	–	5	–	0
Tempe Normal		–		0	–	3	–	0

The 1916 Nevada Sagebrushers football team was an American football team that represented the University of Nevada as an independent during the 1916 college football season. The Sagebrushers were led by second-year head coach Jack Glascock and played their home games at Mackay Field.

== Schedule ==
Date	Opponent	Site	Result	Source
September 20	Stewart Indian School (NV)	Mackay Field; Reno, NV	W 36–7	
September 27	Sacramento AC (CA)	Mackay Field; Reno, NV	W 77–3	
October 14	Olympic Club	Mackay Field; Reno, NV	L 0–20	
October 21	at California freshmen	California Field; Berkeley, CA	L 0–34	
October 28	Utah Agricultural	Mackay Field; Reno, NV	W 9–7	
November 4	University Farm	Mackay Field; Reno, NV	L 7–26	
November 11	California freshmen	Mackay Field; Reno, NV	L 6–36	
November 18	at University Farm	Davis, CA	L 7–27	
