= 1916 University Farm football team =

American college football season

1916 University Farm football
- Conference: Independent
- Record: 6–1–1
- Head coach: Robert E. Harmon (2nd season)
- Captain: Ed Jones

1916 Western college football independents records
| | Conf. | | | Overall |
| Team | W | L | T | W | | L | | T |
|---|---|---|---|---|---|---|---|---|
| Santa Clara | | – | | 10 | – | 0 | – | 0 |
| University Farm | | – | | 6 | – | 1 | – | 1 |
| Montana | | – | | 4 | – | 1 | – | 1 |
| Arizona | | – | | 5 | – | 3 | – | 0 |
| USC | | – | | 5 | – | 3 | – | 0 |
| New Mexico | | – | | 3 | – | 2 | – | 0 |
| Hawaii | | – | | 3 | – | 2 | – | 1 |
| Saint Mary's | | – | | 5 | – | 4 | – | 1 |
| Montana State | | – | | 2 | – | 2 | – | 2 |
| Nevada | | – | | 3 | – | 5 | – | 0 |
| Tempe Normal | | – | | 0 | – | 3 | – | 0 |

The 1916 University Farm football team represented the University Farm—now known as the University of California, Davis—as an independent during the 1916 college football season. Although "University Farm" was the formal name for the school and team, in many newspaper articles from the time it was called "Davis Farm". The team had no nickname in 1916, with the "Aggie" term being introduced in 1922. Led by Robert E. Harmon in his second and final season as head coach, the team compiled a record of 6–1–1 and was outscored its opponents 151 to 63 for the season. The University Farm played home games in Davis, California.

In two seasons under Harmon, the University Farm compiled a record of 9–3–1, for a .731 winning percentage.

== Schedule ==
| Date | Opponent | Site | Result | Source |
|---|---|---|---|---|
| October 7? | Preston Industrial School (Note: The Preston School of Industry opened in 1894 to rehabilitate juvenile offenders. It remained open until 2011.) | | W 65–26 | |
| October 14 | California freshmen | Davis, CA | T 6–6 | |
| October 21 | Saint Mary's | Davis, CA | W 13–3 | |
| October 28 | California third varsity | | W 7–3 | |
| November 4 | at Nevada | Mackay Stadium (Note: This stadium is the predecessor to the current Mackay Stadium, which was opened for the 1966 season.); Reno, NV | W 26–7 | |
| November 11 | Olympic Club | | W 10–9 | |
| November 18 | Nevada | Davis, CA | W 26–7 | |
| November 30 | at California freshmen | California Field; Berkeley, CA | L 0–3 | |
