= 1916 University of New Mexico football team =

American college football season

1916 University of New Mexico football
- Conference: Independent
- Record: 3–2
- Head coach: Ralph Hutchinson (6th season)
- Home stadium: University Field

1916 Western college football independents records
	Conf.			Overall
Team	W	L	T	W		L		T
Santa Clara		–		10	–	0	–	0
University Farm		–		6	–	1	–	1
Montana		–		4	–	1	–	1
Arizona		–		5	–	3	–	0
USC		–		5	–	3	–	0
New Mexico		–		3	–	2	–	0
Hawaii		–		3	–	2	–	1
Saint Mary's		–		5	–	4	–	1
Montana State		–		2	–	2	–	2
Nevada		–		3	–	5	–	0
Tempe Normal		–		0	–	3	–	0

The 1916 University of New Mexico football team was an American football team that represented the University of New Mexico as an independent during the 1916 college football season. In its sixth and final season under head coach Ralph Hutchinson (who was also the university's first athletic director), the team compiled a 3–2 record and outscored opponents by a total of 216 to 70. Carl D. Brorien was the team captain.

The team shut out its opponents in the final three games by a combined score of 214 to 0. The 108-0 victory over Northern Arizona Normal School remains the largest margin of victory in program history.

== Schedule ==
Date	Opponent	Site	Result	Source
October 7	at Colorado College	Colorado Springs, CO	L 2–47	
October 14	Colorado Mines	University Field; Albuquerque, NM	L 0–23	
November 11	Northern Arizona	University Field; Albuquerque, NM	W 108–0	
November 25	Albuquerque Indian School	Albuquerque, NM	W 55–0	
November 30	New Mexico A&M	Albuquerque, NM (rivalry)	W 51–0	
