= Bellevue College (1883–1919) =

Private Presbyterian college in Bellevue, Nebraska, US

Bellevue College was a private Presbyterian college located in Bellevue, Nebraska. The college was founded in 1880 by Henry T. Clarke Sr., a Nebraska pioneer. It opened in 1883, under the auspices of the Presbyterian Synod of Nebraska. Bellevue College closed in 1919, after its board of trustees voted to turn the college over to the government.

Bellevue College's sports teams were known as the Redmen. The school's colors were royal purple and old gold.
