= 1916 Montana State Bobcats football team =

American college football season

1916 Montana State Bobcats football
- Conference: Independent
- Record: 2–2–2
- Head coach: Fred Bennion (3rd season)
- Captain: Jay Duquette

1916 Western college football independents records
	Conf.			Overall
Team	W	L	T	W		L		T
Santa Clara		–		10	–	0	–	0
University Farm		–		6	–	1	–	1
Montana		–		4	–	1	–	1
Arizona		–		5	–	3	–	0
USC		–		5	–	3	–	0
New Mexico		–		3	–	2	–	0
Hawaii		–		3	–	2	–	1
Saint Mary's		–		5	–	4	–	1
Montana State		–		2	–	2	–	2
Nevada		–		3	–	5	–	0
Tempe Normal		–		0	–	3	–	0

The 1916 Montana State Bobcats football team was an American football team that represented the Montana State College (later renamed Montana State University) during the 1916 college football season. In its third season under head coach Fred Bennion, the team compiled a 2–2–2 record and was outscored by a total of 78 to 44.

Jay Duquette was the team captain.

In January 1916, following a student competition to select an appropriate nickname for the school's athletic teams, the nickname "Bobcats" was adopted. Students Fred Bullock and Rupert Streits were credited jointly with offering the name. The Great Falls Daily Tribune expressed approval of the choice: "Fighting, cunning, daring, resourceful and wary is the bobcat, and above all he is a resident of the Treasure state."

== Schedule ==
Date	Opponent	Site	Result	Source
October 7	Butte Athletic Club	Brewer Field; Bozeman, MT	W 27–0	
October 14	Montana Mines	Brewer Field; Bozeman, MT	W 22–7	
October 25	All Stars	Brewer Field; Bozeman, MT	L 0–6	
November 4	Montana	Brewer Field; Bozeman, MT (rivalry)	T 6–6	
November 11	at Gonzaga	Natatorium Park; Spokane, WA	L 6–8	
November 18	at Utah Agricultural	Adams Field; Logan, UT	T 17–17	
