= 1916 USC Trojans football team =

Historical American-football team

1916 USC Trojans football
- Conference: Independent
- Record: 5–3
- Head coach: Dean Cromwell (3rd season)
- Captain: Herb Jones
- Home stadium: Fiesta Park

1916 Western college football independents records
	Conf.			Overall
Team	W	L	T	W		L		T
Santa Clara		–		10	–	0	–	0
University Farm		–		6	–	1	–	1
Montana		–		4	–	1	–	1
Arizona		–		5	–	3	–	0
USC		–		5	–	3	–	0
New Mexico		–		3	–	2	–	0
Hawaii		–		3	–	2	–	1
Saint Mary's		–		5	–	4	–	1
Montana State		–		2	–	2	–	2
Nevada		–		3	–	5	–	0
Tempe Normal		–		0	–	3	–	0

The 1916 USC Trojans football team represented the University of Southern California (USC) as an independent during the 1916 college football season. In their third non-consecutive year under head coach Dean Cromwell (Cromwell was also coach in 1909 and 1910), the Trojans compiled a 5–3 record and outscored their opponents by a combined total of 129 to 80. The season featured USC's first game against Arizona, a 20–7 victory in Phoenix, its third game against California, a 27–0 loss in Los Angeles, and its second game against Oregon Agricultural, a 16–7 loss in Los Angeles.

== Schedule ==
Date	Opponent	Site	Result	Attendance	Source
October 7	Sherman Institute	Fiesta Park; Los Angeles, CA	W 14–0	15,000	
October 14	at Santa Fe Athletic Club	San Bernardino, CA	W 14–0		
October 21	Utah	Fiesta Park; Los Angeles, CA	L 12–27	2,000	
November 4	California	Fiesta Park; Los Angeles, CA	L 0–27	10,000	
November 11	Los Angeles Athletic Club	Fiesta Park; Los Angeles, CA	W 34–0		
November 25	Pomona	Fiesta Park; Los Angeles, CA	W 28–3		
November 30	Oregon Agricultural	Fiesta Park; Los Angeles, CA	L 7–16	5,000	
December 9	vs. Arizona	Phoenix Indian School; Phoenix, AZ	W 20–7	5,000	
