= 1916 Tempe Normal Owls football team =

American college football season

1916 Tempe Normal Owls football
- Conference: Independent
- Record: 0–3
- Head coach: George Schaeffer (3rd season)
- Home stadium: Normal Field

1916 Western college football independents records
	Conf.			Overall
Team	W	L	T	W		L		T
Santa Clara		–		10	–	0	–	0
University Farm		–		6	–	1	–	1
Montana		–		4	–	1	–	1
Arizona		–		5	–	3	–	0
USC		–		5	–	3	–	0
New Mexico		–		3	–	2	–	0
Hawaii		–		3	–	2	–	1
Saint Mary's		–		5	–	4	–	1
Montana State		–		2	–	2	–	2
Nevada		–		3	–	5	–	0
Tempe Normal		–		0	–	3	–	0

The 1916 Tempe Normal Owls football team was an American football team that represented Tempe Normal School (later renamed Arizona State University) as an independent during the 1916 college football season. In their third and final season under head coach George Schaeffer, the Owls compiled a 0–3 record and were outscored by their opponents by a combined total of 51 to 13. Archie Ivy was the team captain.

== Schedule ==
Opponent	Site	Result
Phoenix Indian School Alumni	Normal Field; Tempe, AZ	L 7–25
at Northern Arizona	Flagstaff, AZ	L 6–20
at Prescott High School	Prescott, AZ	L 0–6
