= 1916 Santa Clara Missionites football team =

American college football season

1916 Santa Clara Missionites football
- Conference: Independent
- Record: 10–0
- Head coach: Charles A. Austin (1st season)

1916 Western college football independents records
	Conf.			Overall
Team	W	L	T	W		L		T
Santa Clara		–		10	–	0	–	0
University Farm		–		6	–	1	–	1
Montana		–		4	–	1	–	1
Arizona		–		5	–	3	–	0
USC		–		5	–	3	–	0
New Mexico		–		3	–	2	–	0
Hawaii		–		3	–	2	–	1
Saint Mary's		–		5	–	4	–	1
Montana State		–		2	–	2	–	2
Nevada		–		3	–	5	–	0
Tempe Normal		–		0	–	3	–	0

The 1916 Santa Clara Broncos football team represented Santa Clara University as an independent during the 1916 college football season In their first and only season under head coach Charles A. Austin, the team compiled a 10–0 record, shut out seven of its opponents, and outscored all opponents by a total of 318 to 13. In keeping with West Coast practice during the 1910s, the team played principally under rugby rules rather than American football rules.

The season ended on November 11 with a match between undefeated Santa Clara and undefeated Stanford; Santa Clara won convincingly by a 28–5 score at Ewing Field in San Francisco.

== Schedule ==
Date	Opponent	Site	Result	Source
	Barbarians Club		W 54–0	
	Olympic Club		W 18–0	
	St. Ignatius		W 43–0	
	Olympic Club		W 12–0	
	Palo Alto Athletic Club		W 27–0	
October 15	Olympic Club	Santa Clara, CA	W 30–0	
October 22	Palo Alto Athletic Club	Santa Clara, CA	W 34–3	
October 29	Olympic Club		W 24–5	
November 5	Barbarians Club	Santa Clara, CA	W 48–0	
November 11	vs. Stanford	Ewing Field; San Francisco, CA	W 28–5	
