= 1916 Hawaii Deans football team =

American college football season

1916 Hawaii Deans football
- Conference: Independent
- Record: 3–2–1
- Head coach: W. H. Britton (1st season)
- Captain: Hicks

1916 Western college football independents records
	Conf.			Overall
Team	W	L	T	W		L		T
Santa Clara		–		10	–	0	–	0
University Farm		–		6	–	1	–	1
Montana		–		4	–	1	–	1
Arizona		–		5	–	3	–	0
USC		–		5	–	3	–	0
New Mexico		–		3	–	2	–	0
Hawaii		–		3	–	2	–	1
Saint Mary's		–		5	–	4	–	1
Montana State		–		2	–	2	–	2
Nevada		–		3	–	5	–	0
Tempe Normal		–		0	–	3	–	0

The 1916 Hawaii Deans football team represented the College of Hawaiʻi—now known as the University of Hawaiʻi at Mānoa–as an independent during the 1916 college football season. In their first and only season under head coach W. H. Britton, the Deans compiled a 3–2–1 record.

== Schedule ==
Date	Opponent	Site	Result	Attendance	Source
October 14	at Punahou Academy	Alexander Field; Honolulu, Territory of Hawaii	T 6–6		
October 21	vs. McKinley High School	Alexander Field; Honolulu, Territory of Hawaii	W 14–0		
October 27	Mid-Pacific Institute	Cooke Field; Honolulu, Territory of Hawaii	W 38–6	>400	
November 4	at Kamehameha High School	Kamehameha Field; Honolulu, Territory of Hawaii	L 0–10		
November 18	at Kamehameha High School	Kamehameha Field; Honolulu, Territory of Hawaii	W 9–6		
November 25	vs. Hawaii National Guard	Alexander Field; Honolulu, Territory of Hawaii	L 6–7		
