= 1916 Montana Grizzlies football team =

American college football season

1916 Montana Grizzlies football
- Conference: Independent
- Record: 4–1–1
- Head coach: Jerry Nissen (2nd season)
- Home stadium: Dornblaser Field

1916 Western college football independents records
	Conf.			Overall
Team	W	L	T	W		L		T
Santa Clara		–		10	–	0	–	0
University Farm		–		6	–	1	–	1
Montana		–		4	–	1	–	1
Arizona		–		5	–	3	–	0
USC		–		5	–	3	–	0
New Mexico		–		3	–	2	–	0
Hawaii		–		3	–	2	–	1
Saint Mary's		–		5	–	4	–	1
Montana State		–		2	–	2	–	2
Nevada		–		3	–	5	–	0
Tempe Normal		–		0	–	3	–	0

The 1916 Montana Grizzlies football team represented the University of Montana in the 1916 college football season. They were led by second-year head coach Jerry Nissen, played their home games at Dornblaser Field and finished the season at 4–1–1.

== Schedule ==
Date	Opponent	Site	Result	Source
October 7	vs. South Dakota	Athletic Field; Aberdeen, SD	W 11–0	
October 21	at Gonzaga	Natatorium Park; Spokane, WA	W 20–0	
October 28	Washington State	Dornblaser Field; Missoula, MT	L 0–27	
November 4	at Montana State	Bozeman, MT (rivalry)	T 6–6	
November 11	Whitman	Dornblaser Field; Missoula, MT	W 17–0	
November 18	at Idaho	MacLean Field; Moscow, ID (rivalry)	W 20–13	
