= 1916 California Golden Bears football team =

American college football season

1916 California Golden Bears football
- Conference: Pacific Coast Conference
- Record: 6–4–1 (0–3 PCC)
- Head coach: Andy Smith (1st season)
- Offensive scheme: Short-punt
- Captain: Willis R. Montgomery
- Home stadium: California Field

1916 Pacific Coast Conference football standings
	Conf.					Overall
Team	W		L		T	W		L		T
Washington +	3	–	0	–	1	6	–	0	–	1
Oregon ^ +	2	–	0	–	1	7	–	0	–	1
Oregon Agricultural	0	–	2	–	0	4	–	5	–	0
California	0	–	3	–	0	6	–	4	–	1
+ – Conference co-champions; ^ – Selected as Rose Bowl representative

The 1916 California Golden Bears football team was an American football team that represented the University of California, Berkeley in the Pacific Coast Conference (PCC) during the 1916 college football season. In their first year under head coach Andy Smith, the team compiled a 6–4–1 record (0–3 against PCC opponents), finished in last place in the PCC, and outscored its opponents by a combined total of 192 to 103.

== Schedule ==
Date	Opponent	Site	Result	Attendance	Source
September 16	Olympic Club*	California Field; Berkeley, CA	W 23–0		
September 23	Oakland Originals*	California Field; Berkeley, CA	W 23–0		
September 30	Olympic Club*	California Field; Berkeley, CA	T 0–0		
October 7	Oakland Originals*	California Field; Berkeley, CA	W 13–0		
October 14	Whittier*	California Field; Berkeley, CA	W 21–17		
October 21	Oregon	California Field; Berkeley, CA	L 14–39	10,000	
October 28	Occidental*	California Field; Berkeley, CA	L 13–14		
November 4	at USC*	Fiesta Park; Los Angeles, CA	W 27–0	10,000	
November 11	Saint Mary's*	California Field; Berkeley, CA	W 48–6		
November 18	Washington	California Field; Berkeley, CA	L 3–13	2,000	
November 30	at Washington	Denny Field; Seattle, WA	L 7–14	9,000	
*Non-conference game
