= List of Pac-12 Conference football champions =

This is a list of annual Pac-12 Conference football champions. Co-champions are listed with the conference's Rose Bowl representative first. Pacific Coast Conference results are included. Since 2011, the Pac-12 Football Championship Game has determined the champion. PCC champions were awarded the Schwabacher Trophy. In 2024, the conference was reduced to two teams following conference realignment. While the remaining schools, Oregon State and Washington State, formed a scheduling agreement with the Mountain West Conference, those games did not count towards the Pac-12 standings. In 2026, the conference was reborn with the addition of six new members.

== Champions by year ==
The following teams have been designated as champions by the conference.

National champions*

		Record		Ranking				
Year	Champions	Conference	Overall	AP	Coaches	CFP	Bowl Result	Head coach
Pacific Coast Conference
1916	Oregon	2–0–1	7–0–1	Started in 1934	Started in 1950	Started in 2014	W Rose Bowl 14–0 vs. Penn	Hugo Bezdek
1916	Washington	3–0–1	6–0–1	Started in 1934	Started in 1950	Started in 2014	–	Gil Dobie
1917	Washington State	3–0	6–0	Started in 1934	Started in 1950	Started in 2014	–	William Henry Dietz
1918	California	2–0	7–2	Started in 1934	Started in 1950	Started in 2014	–	Andy Smith
1919	Oregon	2–1	5–1–3	Started in 1934	Started in 1950	Started in 2014	L Rose Bowl 6–7 vs. Harvard	Shy Huntington
1919	Washington	2–1	5–1	Started in 1934	Started in 1950	Started in 2014	–	Claude J. Hunt
1920*	California‡	3–0	9–0	Started in 1934	Started in 1950	Started in 2014	W Rose Bowl 28–0 vs Ohio State	Andy Smith
1921*	California‡	4–0	9–0–1	Started in 1934	Started in 1950	Started in 2014	T Rose Bowl 0–0 vs. Washington & Jefferson	Andy Smith
1922*	California‡	4–0	9–0	Started in 1934	Started in 1950	Started in 2014	–	Andy Smith
1923*	California‡	5–0	9–0–1	Started in 1934	Started in 1950	Started in 2014	–	Andy Smith
1924	Stanford	3–0–1	7–1–1	Started in 1934	Started in 1950	Started in 2014	L Rose Bowl 10–27 vs. Notre Dame	Glenn "Pop" Warner
1924	California	2–0–2	8–0–2	Started in 1934	Started in 1950	Started in 2014	–	Andy Smith
1925	Washington	5–0	10–1–1	Started in 1934	Started in 1950	Started in 2014	L Rose Bowl 19–20 vs. Alabama	Enoch Bagshaw
1926*	Stanford§	4–0	10–0–1	Started in 1934	Started in 1950	Started in 2014	T Rose Bowl 7–7 vs. Alabama	Glenn "Pop" Warner
1927	Stanford	4–0–1	8–2–1	Started in 1934	Started in 1950	Started in 2014	W Rose Bowl vs. Pittsburgh	Glenn "Pop" Warner
1927	USC	4–0–1	8–1–1	Started in 1934	Started in 1950	Started in 2014	–	Howard Jones
1927	Idaho (Note: Idaho appears in contemporaneous PCC reports, but not in the 2016 Pac-12 media guide)	2–0–2	4–1–3	Started in 1934	Started in 1950	Started in 2014	–	Charles Erb
1928*	USC@	4–0–1	9–0–1	Started in 1934	Started in 1950	Started in 2014	–	Howard Jones
1929	USC	6–1	10–2	Started in 1934	Started in 1950	Started in 2014	W Rose Bowl 47–14 vs. Pittsburgh	Howard Jones
1930	Washington State	6–0	9–1	Started in 1934	Started in 1950	Started in 2014	L Rose Bowl 0–24 vs. Alabama	Babe Hollingbery
1931*	USC@	7–0	10–1	Started in 1934	Started in 1950	Started in 2014	W Rose Bowl 21–12 vs. Tulane	Howard Jones
1932*	USC@	6–0	10–0	Started in 1934	Started in 1950	Started in 2014	W Rose Bowl 35–0 vs. Pittsburgh	Howard Jones
1933	Stanford	4–1	8–2–1	Started in 1934	Started in 1950	Started in 2014	L Rose Bowl 0–7 vs. Columbia	Claude E. Thornhill
1933	Oregon	4–1	9–1	Started in 1934	Started in 1950	Started in 2014	–	Prink Callison
1934	Stanford	5–0	9–1–1	No. 4	Started in 1950	Started in 2014	L Rose Bowl 13–29 vs. Alabama	Claude E. Thornhill
1935	Stanford	4–1	8–1	N/A	Started in 1950	Started in 2014	W Rose Bowl 7–0 vs. Southern Methodist	Claude E. Thornhill
1935	California	4–1	9–1	N/A	Started in 1950	Started in 2014	–	Stub Allison
1935	UCLA	4–1	8–2	N/A	Started in 1950	Started in 2014	–	William H. Spaulding
1936	Washington	7–0–1	7–2–1	No. 5	Started in 1950	Started in 2014	L Rose Bowl 0–21 vs. Pittsburgh	James Phelan
1937*	California‡	6–0–1	10–0–1	No. 2	Started in 1950	Started in 2014	W Rose Bowl 13–0 vs. Alabama	Stub Allison
1938	USC	6–1	9–2	No. 7	Started in 1950	Started in 2014	W Rose Bowl 7–3 vs. Duke	Howard Jones
1938	California	6–1	10–1	No. 14	Started in 1950	Started in 2014	–	Stub Allison
1939*	USC@	5–0–2	8–0–2	No. 3	Started in 1950	Started in 2014	W Rose Bowl 14–0 vs. Tennessee	Howard Jones
1940	Stanford	7–0	10–0	No. 2	Started in 1950	Started in 2014	W Rose Bowl 21–13 vs. Nebraska	Clark Shaughnessy
1941	Oregon State	7–2	8–2	No. 12	Started in 1950	Started in 2014	W Rose Bowl 20–16 vs. Duke	Lon Stiner
1942	UCLA	6–1	7–4	No. 13	Started in 1950	Started in 2014	L Rose Bowl 0–9 vs. Georgia	Edwin C. Horrell
1943	USC	5–0	8–2	–	Started in 1950	Started in 2014	W Rose Bowl 29–0 vs. Washington	Jeff Cravath
1944	USC	3–0–2	8–0–2	No. 7	Started in 1950	Started in 2014	W Rose Bowl 25–0 vs. Tennessee	Jeff Cravath
1945	USC	5–1	7–4	No. 11	Started in 1950	Started in 2014	L Rose Bowl 14–34 vs. Alabama	Jeff Cravath
1946	UCLA	7–0	10–1	No. 4	Started in 1950	Started in 2014	L Rose Bowl 14–45 vs. Illinois	Bert LaBrucherie
1947	USC	6–0	7–2–1	No. 8	Started in 1950	Started in 2014	L Rose Bowl 0–49 vs. Michigan	Jeff Cravath
1948	California	6–0	10–1	No. 4	Started in 1950	Started in 2014	L Rose Bowl 14–20 vs. Northwestern	Pappy Waldorf
1948	Oregon	7–0	9–2	No. 9	Started in 1950	Started in 2014	L Cotton Bowl Classic 13–21 vs. Southern Methodist	Jim Aiken
1949	California	7–0	10–1	No. 3	Started in 1950	Started in 2014	L Rose Bowl 14–17 vs. Ohio State	Pappy Waldorf
1950	California	5–0–1	9–1–1	No. 5	No. 4	Started in 2014	L Rose Bowl 6–14 vs. Michigan	Pappy Waldorf
1951	Stanford	6–1	9–2	No. 7	No. 7	Started in 2014	L Rose Bowl 7–40 vs. Illinois	Chuck Taylor
1952	USC	6–0	10–1	No. 5	No. 4	Started in 2014	W Rose Bowl vs. Wisconsin	Jess Hill
1953	UCLA	6–1	8–2	No. 5	No. 4	Started in 2014	L Rose Bowl 20–28 vs. Michigan State	Red Sanders
1954*	UCLA	6–0	9–0	No. 2	No. 1	Started in 2014	–	Red Sanders
1955	UCLA	6–0	9–2	No. 4	No. 4	Started in 2014	L Rose Bowl 14–17 vs. Michigan State	Red Sanders
1956	Oregon State	6–1–1	7–3–1	No. 10	No. 13	Started in 2014	L Rose Bowl 19–35 vs. Iowa	Tommy Prothro
1957	Oregon	6–2	7–4	–	No. 17	Started in 2014	L Rose Bowl 7–10 vs. Ohio State	Len Casanova
1957	Oregon State	6–2	8–2	–	–	Started in 2014	–	Tommy Prothro
1958	California	6–1	7–4	No. 16	No. 16	Started in 2014	L Rose Bowl 12–38 vs. Iowa	Pete Elliott
Athletic Association of Western Universities
1959	Washington	3–1	10–1	No. 8	No. 7	Started in 2014	W Rose Bowl 44–8 vs. Wisconsin	Jim Owens
1959	UCLA	3–1	5–4–1	–	–	Started in 2014	–	William F. Barnes
1959	USC	3–1	8–2	No. 14	No. 13	Started in 2014	–	Don Clark
1960*	Washington^	4–0	10–1	No. 6	–	Started in 2014	W Rose Bowl 17–7 vs. Minnesota	Jim Owens
1961	UCLA	3–1	7–4	No. 16	–	Started in 2014	L Rose Bowl 3–21 vs. Minnesota	William F. Barnes
1962*	USC	4–0	11–0	No. 1	No. 1	Started in 2014	W Rose Bowl 42–37 vs. Wisconsin	John McKay
1963	Washington	4–1	6–5	–	No. 15	Started in 2014	L Rose Bowl 7–17 vs. Illinois	Jim Owens
1964	Oregon State	3–1	8–3	No. 8	No. 8	Started in 2014	L Rose Bowl 7–34 vs. Michigan	Tommy Prothro
1964	USC	3–1	7–3	No. 10	No. 10	Started in 2014	–	John McKay
1965	UCLA	4–0	8–2–1	No. 4	No. 5	Started in 2014	W Rose Bowl 14–12 vs. Michigan State	Tommy Prothro
1966	USC	4–1	7–4	–	No. 18	Started in 2014	L Rose Bowl 13–14 vs. Purdue	John McKay
1967*	USC	6–1	10–1	No. 1	No. 1	Started in 2014	W Rose Bowl 14–3 vs. Indiana	John McKay
Pacific-8 Conference
1968	USC	6–0	9–1–1	No. 4	No. 2	Started in 2014	L Rose Bowl 16–27 vs. Ohio State	John McKay
1969	USC	6–0	10–0–1	No. 3	No. 4	Started in 2014	W Rose Bowl 10–3 vs. Michigan	John McKay
1970	Stanford	6–1	9–3	No. 8	No. 10	Started in 2014	W Rose Bowl 27–17 vs. Ohio State	John Ralston
1971	Stanford	6–1	9–3	No. 10	No. 16	Started in 2014	W Rose Bowl 13–12 vs. Michigan	John Ralston
1972*	USC	7–0	12–0	No. 1	No. 1	Started in 2014	W Rose Bowl 42–17 vs. Ohio State	John McKay
1973	USC	7–0	9–2–1	No. 8	No. 7	Started in 2014	L Rose Bowl 21–42 vs. Ohio State	John McKay
1974*	USC	6–0–1	10–1–1	No. 2	No. 1	Started in 2014	W Rose Bowl 18–17 vs. Ohio State	John McKay
1975	UCLA	6–1	9–2–1	No. 5	No. 5	Started in 2014	W Rose Bowl 23–10 vs. Ohio State	Dick Vermeil
1975	California	6–1	8–3	No. 14	No. 15	Started in 2014	–	Mike White
1976	USC	7–0	11–1	No. 2	No. 2	Started in 2014	W Rose Bowl 14–6 vs. Michigan	John Robinson
1977	Washington	6–1	8–4	No. 10	No. 9	Started in 2014	W Rose Bowl 27–20 vs. Michigan	Don James
Pacific-10 Conference
1978*	USC	6–1	12–1	No. 2	No. 1	Started in 2014	W Rose Bowl 17–10 vs. Michigan	John Robinson
1979	USC	6–0	11–0–1	No. 2	No. 2	Started in 2014	W Rose Bowl 17–16 vs. Ohio State	John Robinson
1980	Washington	6–1	9–3	No. 16	No. 17	Started in 2014	L Rose Bowl 6–23 vs. Michigan	Don James
1981	Washington	6–2	10–2	No. 10	No. 7	Started in 2014	W Rose Bowl 28–0 vs. Iowa	Don James
1982	UCLA	5–1–1	10–1–1	No. 5	No. 5	Started in 2014	W Rose Bowl 24–14 vs. Michigan	Terry Donahue
1983	UCLA	6–1–1	7–4–1	No. 17	No. 13	Started in 2014	W Rose Bowl 45–9 vs. Illinois	Terry Donahue
1984	USC	7–1	9–3	No. 10	No. 9	Started in 2014	W Rose Bowl 20–17 vs. Ohio State	Ted Tollner
1985	UCLA	6–2	9–2–1	No. 7	No. 6	Started in 2014	W Rose Bowl 45–28 vs. Iowa	Terry Donahue
1986	Arizona State	5–1–1	10–1–1	No. 4	No. 5	Started in 2014	W Rose Bowl 22–15 vs. Michigan	John Cooper
1987	USC	7–1	8–4	No. 18	No. 17	Started in 2014	L Rose Bowl 20–17 vs. Michigan State	Larry Smith
1987	UCLA	7–1	10–2	No. 9	No. 11	Started in 2014	W Aloha Bowl 20–16 vs. Florida	Terry Donahue
1988	USC	8–0	10–2	No. 7	No. 9	Started in 2014	L Rose Bowl 14–22 vs. Michigan	Larry Smith
1989	USC	6–0–1	9–2–1	No. 8	No. 9	Started in 2014	W Rose Bowl 17–10 vs. Michigan	Larry Smith
1990	Washington	7–1	10–2	No. 5	No. 5	Started in 2014	W Rose Bowl 46–34 vs. Iowa	Don James
1991*	Washington	8–0	12–0	No. 2	No. 1	Started in 2014	W Rose Bowl 34–14 vs. Michigan	Don James
1992	Washington	6–2	9–3	No. 11	No. 10	Started in 2014	L Rose Bowl 31–38 vs. Michigan	Don James
1992	Stanford	6–2	10–3	No. 9	No. 9	Started in 2014	W Blockbuster Bowl 24–3 vs. Penn State	Bill Walsh
1993	UCLA	6–2	8–4	No. 18	No. 17	Started in 2014	L Rose Bowl 16–21 vs. Wisconsin	Terry Donahue
1993	Arizona	6–2	10–2	No. 10	No. 9	Started in 2014	W Fiesta Bowl 29–0 vs. Miami	Dick Tomey
1993	USC	6–2	8–5	–	No. 25	Started in 2014	W Freedom Bowl 28–21 vs. Utah	John Robinson
1994	Oregon	7–1	9–4	No. 11	No. 11	Started in 2014	L Rose Bowl 20–38 vs. Penn State	Rich Brooks
1995	USC	6–1–1	9–2–1	No. 12	No. 11	Started in 2014	W Rose Bowl 41–32 vs. Northwestern	John Robinson
1995	Washington	6–1–1	7–4–1	–	–	Started in 2014	L Sun Bowl 18–38 vs. Iowa	Jim Lambright
1996	Arizona State	8–0	11–1	No. 4	No. 4	Started in 2014	L Rose Bowl 17–20 vs. Ohio State	Bruce Snyder
1997	Washington State	7–1	10–2	No. 9	No. 9	Started in 2014	L Rose Bowl 16–21 vs. Michigan	Mike Price
1997	UCLA	7–1	10–2	No. 5	No. 5	Started in 2014	W Cotton Bowl Classic 29–23 vs. Texas A&M	Bob Toledo
1998	UCLA	8–0	10–2	No. 8	No. 8	Started in 2014	L Rose Bowl 31–38 vs. Wisconsin	Bob Toledo
1999	Stanford	7–1	8–4	–	No. 24	Started in 2014	L Rose Bowl 9–17 vs. Wisconsin	Tyrone Willingham
2000	Washington	7–1	11–1	No. 3	No. 3	Started in 2014	W Rose Bowl 34–24 vs. Purdue	Rick Neuheisel
2000	Oregon	7–1	10–2	No. 7	No. 9	Started in 2014	W Holiday Bowl 35–30 vs. Texas	Mike Bellotti
2000	Oregon State	7–1	11–1	No. 4	No. 5	Started in 2014	W Fiesta Bowl 41–9 vs. Notre Dame	Dennis Erickson
2001	Oregon	7–1	11–1	No. 2	No. 2	Started in 2014	W Fiesta Bowl 38–16 vs. Colorado	Mike Bellotti
2002	Washington State	7–1	10–3	No. 10	No. 10	Started in 2014	L Rose Bowl 14–34 vs. Oklahoma	Mike Price
2002	USC	7–1	11–2	No. 4	No. 4	Started in 2014	W Orange Bowl 38–17 vs. Iowa	Pete Carroll
2003*	USC	7–1	12–1	No. 1	No. 2	Started in 2014	W Rose Bowl 28–14 vs. Michigan	Pete Carroll
2004*	USC†	7†–0	11†–0	No. 1	No. 1	Started in 2014	W Orange Bowl 55–19 vs. Oklahoma	Pete Carroll
2005	USC†	0†–0	0†–0	No. 2	No. 2	Started in 2014	L Rose Bowl 38–41 vs. Texas	Pete Carroll
2006	USC	7–2	11–2	No. 4	No. 4	Started in 2014	W Rose Bowl 32–18 vs. Michigan	Pete Carroll
2006	California	7–2	10–3	No. 14	No. 14	Started in 2014	W Holiday Bowl 45–10 vs. Texas A&M	Jeff Tedford
2007	USC	7–2	11–2	No. 3	No. 2	Started in 2014	W Rose Bowl 49–17 vs. Illinois	Pete Carroll
2007	Arizona State	7–2	10–3	No. 16	No. 13	Started in 2014	L Holiday Bowl 34–52 vs. Texas	Dennis Erickson
2008	USC	8–1	12–1	No. 3	No. 2	Started in 2014	W Rose Bowl 38–24 vs. Penn State	Pete Carroll
2009	Oregon	8–1	10–3	No. 11	No. 11	Started in 2014	L Rose Bowl 17–26 vs. Ohio State	Chip Kelly
2010	Oregon	9–0	12–1	No. 3	No. 3	Started in 2014	L BCS National Championship 19–22 vs. Auburn	Chip Kelly
Pac-12 Conference
2011	Oregon	8–1	12–2	No. 4	No. 4	Started in 2014	W Rose Bowl 45–38 vs. Wisconsin	Chip Kelly
2012	Stanford	8–1	12–2	No. 7	No. 6	Started in 2014	W Rose Bowl 20–14 vs. Wisconsin	David Shaw
2013	Stanford	7–2	11–3	No. 11	No. 10	Started in 2014	L Rose Bowl 20–24 vs. Michigan State	David Shaw
2014	Oregon	8–1	13–2	No. 2	No. 2	No. 2	W Rose Bowl 59–20 vs. Florida State; L CFP National Championship 20–42 vs. Ohio State	Mark Helfrich
2015	Stanford	8–1	12–2	No. 3	No. 3	No. 6	W Rose Bowl 45–16 vs. Iowa	David Shaw
2016	Washington	8–1	12–2	No. 4	No. 4	No. 4	L Peach Bowl 7–24 vs. Alabama	Chris Petersen
2017	USC	8–1	11–2	No. 12	No. 10	No. 8	L Cotton Bowl 7–24 vs. Ohio State	Clay Helton
2018	Washington	7–2	10–3	No. 13	No. 13	No. 9	L Rose Bowl 23–28 vs. Ohio State	Chris Petersen
2019	Oregon	8–1	12–2	No. 5	No. 5	No. 6	W Rose Bowl 28–27 vs. Wisconsin	Mario Cristobal
2020	Oregon	3–2	4–3	–	–	No. 25	L Fiesta Bowl 17–34 vs. Iowa State	Mario Cristobal
2021	Utah	8–1	10–4	No. 12	No. 12	No. 11	L Rose Bowl 45–48 vs. Ohio State	Kyle Whittingham
2022	Utah	7–2	10–4	No. 10	No. 11	No. 11	L Rose Bowl 21–35 vs. Penn State	Kyle Whittingham
2023	Washington	9–0	14–1	No. 2	No. 2	No. 2	W Sugar Bowl 37–31 vs. Texas; L CFP National Championship 13–34 vs. Michigan	Kalen DeBoer
		Record		Ranking				

† The NCAA sanctioned USC in June, 2010 for violations in the football, men's basketball, and women's tennis programs. USC football vacated two wins from their final two games of the 2004 season (one conference game and a bowl game) and all 12 wins from the 2005 season, as well as the conference titles from both years. Their 2004 BCS National Championship was vacated, while their 2004 Associated Press title was not removed.
‡ California claims five national titles that are based upon one contemporary "major selector" (Dick Dunkel in 1937) and seven retrospective selectors listed in the NCAA Football Bowl Subdivision Records (five of the eight selectors being math systems).
§ Stanford was selected in 1926 by a contemporary “major selector” (Frank Dickinson) and later by three retrospective selectors (two of the four being math systems).
@ USC claims national titles in 1931 and 1932 that are based upon four contemporary “major selectors” (William Boand, Frank Dickinson, Dick Dunkel, and Deke Houlgate) and nine later retrospective selectors (nine of the 13 selectors being math systems). USC claims national titles in 1928 and 1939 that are based upon a contemporary selector (Dickinson) and a retrospective selector (1928 only), both math systems.
^ Washington was selected in 1960 by the Helms Athletic Foundation.

== Championships by team ==
School	Championships	Last championship
USC	37^	2017
Washington	18	2023
UCLA	17	1998
Stanford	15	2015
California	15	2006
Oregon	14	2020
Oregon State	5	2000
Washington State	4	2002
Arizona State	3	2007
Utah	2	2022
Arizona	1	1993
Idaho	1	1927
Colorado	0	–
Montana	0	–

^ Does not include USC's vacated 2004 and 2005 Pacific-10 Conference titles

== Championships by coach ==
Coach	Pac-12 Championships	National Championships
John McKay	9	4
Pete Carroll	7	2
Howard Jones	7	4
Don James	6	1
Andy Smith	6	4
Terry Donahue	5	–
John Robinson	5	1
Tommy Prothro	4	–
Jeff Cravath	4	–
Stub Allison	3	1
Chip Kelly	3	–
Jim Owens	3	1
Red Sanders	3	1
David Shaw	3	–
Larry Smith	3	–
Claude E. Thornhill	3	–
Pappy Waldorf	3	–
Glenn "Pop" Warner	3	1
William F. Barnes	2	–
Mike Bellotti	2	–
Mario Cristobal	2	–
Dennis Erickson	2	–
Chris Petersen	2	–
Mike Price	2	–
John Ralston	2	–
Bob Toledo	2	–
Kyle Whittingham	2	–
Jim Aiken	1	–
Enoch Bagshaw	1	–
Hugo Bezdek	1	–
Rich Brooks	1	–
Prink Callison	1	–
Len Casanova	1	–
Don Clark	1	–
John Cooper	1	–
Kalen DeBoer	1	–
William Henry Dietz	1	–
Gil Dobie	1	–
Pete Elliott	1	–
Charles Erb	1	–
Mark Helfrich	1	–
Clay Helton	1	–
Jess Hill	1	–
Babe Hollingbery	1	–
Edwin C. Horrell	1	–
Claude J. Hunt	1	–
Shy Huntington	1	–
Bert LaBrucherie	1	–
Jim Lambright	1	–
Rick Neuheisel	1	–
James Phelan	1	–
Clark Shaughnessy	1	–
Bruce Snyder	1	–
William H. Spaulding	1	–
Lon Stiner	1	–
Chuck Taylor	1	–
Jeff Tedford	1	–
Ted Tollner	1	–
Dick Tomey	1	–
Dick Vermeil	1	–
Bill Walsh	1	–
Tyrone Willingham	1	–
Mike White	1	–

^ Does not include USC's vacated 2004 and 2005 Pacific-10 Conference titles

== Pac-12 Championship Game ==
From 2011 to the cessation of Pac-12 football in 2023, the championship game has determined the conference champion. The game matches the highest-placed team from the North and South Divisions. From inauguration until 2017, the North Division representative won every championship game. (AP Poll rankings are indicated.)

Year	North Division	Pts	South Division	Pts
2011	No. 9 Oregon	49	UCLA	31
2012	No. 8 Stanford	27	No. 16 UCLA	24
2013	No. 7 Stanford	38	No. 11 Arizona State	14
2014	No. 2 Oregon	51	No. 7 Arizona	13
2015	No. 7 Stanford	41	No. 20 USC	22
2016	No. 4 Washington	41	No. 9 Colorado	10
2017	No. 14 Stanford	28	No. 11 USC	31
2018	No. 11 Washington	10	No. 17 Utah	3
2019	No. 13 Oregon	37	No. 5 Utah	15
2020	Oregon	31	No. 13 USC	24
2021	No. 10 Oregon	10	No. 17 Utah	38
2022	No. 4 USC	24	No. 11 Utah	47
2023	No. 3 Washington	34	No. 5 Oregon	31

== Division championships ==
=== North Division ===
Team	Number	Years
Oregon	6	**2011**†, 2012†, 2013†, **2014**, **2019**, **2021**
Stanford	5	2011†, **2012**†, **2013**†, **2015**, **2017**†
Washington	4	**2016**, 2017†, **2018†**, 2020‡
Washington State	1	2018†
California	0	
Oregon State	0	

† - Shared championship
‡ - Washington was replaced in the 2020 conference championship game by runner-up Oregon due to insufficient student-athletes during the COVID-19 pandemic
Bold - Championship game participant

=== South Division ===
Team	Number	Years
Utah	4	2015†, **2018**, **2019**, **2021**
USC	3	**2015**†, **2017**, **2020**
UCLA	2	**2011**‡, **2012**
Arizona	1	**2014**
Arizona State	1	**2013**
Colorado	1	**2016**

† - Shared championship
‡ - UCLA won the 2011 title as USC was ineligible for postseason play
Bold - Championship game participant

=== All-time school records (ranked according to all time wins) ===
Through end of the 2023 season. Records reflect official NCAA results, including any forfeits or win vacating.

#	Pac–12	Record	Win %	Pac–12 Conference Championships	National Championships
1	USC	875–365–54	.697	37	11
2	Washington	784–465–50	.623	18	2
3	Colorado	723–544–36	.569	0	1
4	Utah	719–481–31	.597	2	0
5	Oregon	703–513–46	.575	13	0
6	California	694–570–51	.547	14	5
7	Stanford	670–496–49	.572	15	2
8	UCLA	637–446–37	.585	17	1
9	Arizona	633–499–33	.558	1	0
10	Arizona State	633–429–24	.594	3	0
11	Washington State	576–581–45	.498	4	0
12	Oregon State	569–629–50	.476	5	0

=== Pac-12 Team vs. Team Results ===
	Arizona	ASU	California	Colorado	Oregon	OSU	Stanford	UCLA	USC	Utah	Washington	WSU
vs. Arizona	–	44–51–1	15–19–2	16–10–0	29–17–0	16–25–1	17–15–0	27–19–2	39–8–0	26–20–2	26–11–1	19–28–0
vs. Arizona State	51–44–1	–	19–17–0	4–10–0	21–18–0	16–30–1	15–18–0	23–16–1	26–14–0	12–22–0	18–22–0	17–27–2
vs. California	19–15–2	17–19–0	–	5–7–0	43–41–2	36–40–0	65–50–11	58–35–1	73–32–5	7–6–0	56–41–4	30–49–5
vs. Colorado	10–16–0	10–4–0	7–5–0	–	16–9–0	8–6–0	6–7–0	14–5–0	17–0–0	35–32–3	13–7–1	8–6–0
vs. Oregon	17–29–0	18–21–0	41–43–2	9–16–0	–	49–68–10	50–36–1	40–32–0	39–23–2	11–25–0	63–48–5	42–52–7
vs. Oregon State	25–16–1	30–16–1	40–36–0	6–8–0	68–49–10	–	59–28–3	43–18–4	65–12–4	12–14–1	69–48–5	57–49–3
vs. Stanford	15–17–0	18–15–0	50–65–11	6–7–0	36–50–1	28–59–3	–	49–43–3	65–43–3	7–4–0	45–45–4	31–41–1
vs. UCLA	19–27–2	16–23–1	35–58–1	5–14–0	32–40–0	18–43–4	43–49–3	–	52–34–7	9–12–0	32–42–2	20–42–1
vs. USC	8–39–0	14–26–0	32–73–5	0–17–0	23–39–2	12–65–4	34–65–3	34–52–7	–	10–13–0	31–52–4	10–62–4
vs. Utah	20–26–2	22–12–0	6–7–0	32–35–3	25–11–0	14–12–1	4–7–0	12–9–0	13–10–0	–	14–2–0	9–10–0
vs. Washington	11–26–1	22–18–0	41–56–4	7–13–1	48–63–5	48–69–5	45–45–4	43–32–2	52–31–4	2–14–0	–	35–68–4
vs. Washington State	28–19–0	27–17–2	49–30–5	6–8–0	52–42–7	49–57–3	41–31–1	42–20–1	62–10–4	10–9–0	68–35–4	–
Total	223–274–9	239–221–5	335–410–30	89–152–4	393–378–27	294–474–32	380–351–26	385–281–21	504–217–29	141–173–6	433–353–30	276–428–27

== See also ==
- College football national championships in NCAA Division I FBS
- List of Pac-12 Conference football standings
