= Hal Pangle =

American football player (1911–1947)

- Pangle in 1933

No. 21
- Positions: Fullback, halfback

Personal information
- Born: May 4, 1912; Huntington Beach, CA, USA
- Died: January 1, 1968 (Age 55); Sierra Madre, California, USA
- Listed height: 5 ft 10 in (1.78 m)
- Listed weight: 200 lb (91 kg)

Career information
- High school: Santa Ana (California)
- College: Oregon State

Career history
- 1935–1938: Chicago Cardinals

Career statistics
- Games played: 35
- Starts: 16
- Yards rushing: 357
- Yards per carry: 3
- Yards receiving: 272
- Touchdowns: 3

Hal Pangle
- Pangle in 1933

No. 21
- Positions: Fullback; Halfback

Personal information
- Born: May 4, 1912; Huntington Beach, California, U.S.
- Died: January 1, 1968 (aged 55); Sierra Madre, California, U.S.
- Listed height: 5 ft 10 in (1.78 m)
- Listed weight: 200 lb (91 kg)

Career information
- High school: Santa Ana (Santa Ana, California)
- College: Oregon State

Career history
- Chicago Cardinals (1935–1938)

Career statistics
- Games played: 35
- Starts: 16
- Rushing yards: 357
- Yards per carry: 3
- Touchdowns: 3
- Stats at Pro Football Reference

Harold James "Hal" Pangle (May 4, 1912 – January 1, 1968) was an American football running back who played professionally with the Chicago Cardinals from 1935 to 1938. He played varsity football for the Oregon State Beavers from 1932 to 1934.

Pangle was a starter on the 1933 Oregon State team remembered for playing the undefeated two-time national champion USC Trojans to a 0–0 tie using only eleven "Iron Men" for the entire duration of the game.

== Biography ==
=== Early life ===
Hal Pangle was born May 4, 1912, in Huntington Beach, California. He attended Santa Ana High School in Santa Ana, California.

=== College career ===
Pangle entered Oregon State College in Corvallis, Oregon in 1931, playing fullback that season for the school's junior varsity football team.

In 1932 the sophomore Pangle was promoted to the varsity team at Oregon State where he was moved to halfback by head coach Paul J. Schissler, playing safety and serving as signal-caller when on the defensive side of the ball.

Pangle was again shifted in playing position for the 1933 season for Oregon State under new head coach Lonnie Stiner, who made him starting quarterback, essentially a blocker and pass receiver under the single wing formation favored by the new coach.

He was one of eleven OSC players who on October 21 played the undefeated two-time defending national champion USC Trojans to a scoreless tie, ending that team's streak of consecutive victories at 25.

=== Professional career ===
Pangle as a member of the NFL's Cardinals in 1936.

Ahead of the 1935 NFL season Pangle signed a contract with the Chicago Cardinals of the National Football League (NFL). He would have a four-year career with the Cardinals, primarily as a fullback, playing a total of 36 games, during which he rushed for 357 yards and added 272 yards receiving, scoring a total of three touchdowns in the league.

After leaving professional football at the end of the 1938 season, Pangle returned to Oregon where he entered the world of coaching as an assistant coach under Spec Keene at Willamette University in Salem. Pangle was credited for helping to install a new offense there based upon a man-in-motion moving towards rather than away from the ball at the time of the snap to the tailback, creating defensive confusion. The system proved successful and started a winning tradition at Willamette that continued long after Pangle left the program for a career in the military.

=== Military career ===
Pangle then entered the United States Army, becoming a career soldier. He retired from service with the rank of colonel.

=== Death and legacy ===
Pangle died of a heart attack on January 1, 1968, at a New Year's party at Sierra Madre, California. He was 55 years old at the time of his death.
