= Lou Little =

American football player and coach

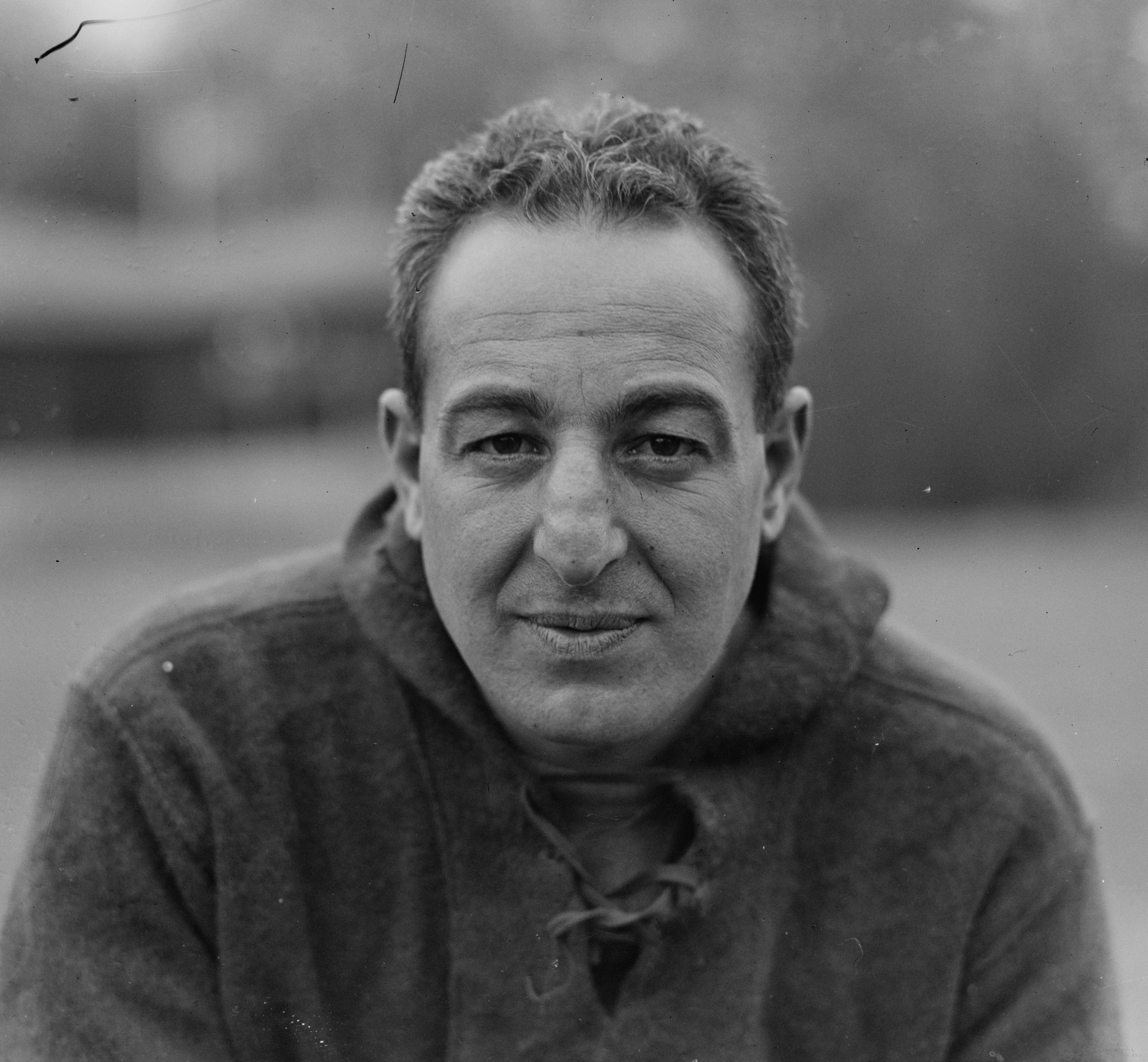
- Little in 1926

Profile
- Position: Tackle

Personal information
- Born: December 6, 1891; Boston, Massachusetts, U.S.
- Died: May 28, 1979 (aged 87); Delray Beach, Florida, U.S.

Career information
- College: Penn

Career history

Playing
- Frankford Yellow Jackets (1920–1923)

Coaching
- Georgetown (1924–1929); Columbia (1930–1956)

Awards and highlights
- Coaching record: 151–128–13; Bowl record:1–0; Amos Alonzo Stagg Award winner (1953)
- Military career
- Allegiance: United States
- Branch: U.S. Army
- Service years: 1917–1918
- Rank: Captain
- Unit: 6th Infantry Division
- Conflicts: World War I Meuse-Argonne Offensive
- College Football Hall of Fame

Luigi "Lou Little" Piccirilli December 6, 1891 – May 28, 1979) was an American football player and coach. He served as the head coach at Georgetown College—now known as Georgetown University—from 1924 to 1929 and Columbia University from 1930 to 1956, compiling a career college football coaching record of 151–128–13. Little played college football as a tackle at the University of Pennsylvania for the 1916 and 1919 seasons and professionally with the Frankford Yellow Jackets of the National Football League (NFL) from 1920 to 1923. He was inducted into the College Football Hall of Fame as a coach in 1960. Little appeared as Lu Libble in Jack Kerouac's novel Maggie Cassidy, a fictionalized account of Kerouac's early life.

== Early life, playing career, and military service ==
Little was born in Boston. After his birth, his father changed his family name to "Little", translating the Italian family name, and moved his family to Leominster, Massachusetts, in 1896. Little played football at Leominster High School, where he was the team captain in 1910, his senior season. The 1910 team, led by Little's stellar play, was Leominster's first undefeated football team. Little went on to play one postgraduate season for the Worcester Academy Hilltoppers, in 1911. before returning to coach his alma mater, Leominster High School, for one season, in 1912.

Little, played college football at the University of Pennsylvania. He gained national attention as a varsity tackle during 1916 season and was named All-American, and again in the 1919 season. Between those years, he served with distinction during World War I with the American Expeditionary Forces in France. Commissioned as a lieutenant, he was promoted to a captain in the 6th Infantry Division. He saw action in the Meuse-Argonne Offensive.

== Coaching career ==
In 1924, Little accepted the post of head football coach at Georgetown and held the position until 1930, when he resigned to become head football coach at Columbia University. Little was the head coach at Columbia from 1930 to 1956. He was probably best known for two wins: the 1934 Rose Bowl when Columbia beat Stanford, 7–0, and a 21–20 win over Army in 1947 in which the Columbia Lions handed the Cadets their first loss since the 1943 season finale, snapping a 23-game undefeated streak. At Columbia, Little coached future Pro Football Hall of Fame quarterback Sid Luckman and writer Jack Kerouac, who broke his leg playing in 1940. Other players he coached include Paul Governali, Lou Kusserow, Cliff Montgomery and Bill Swiacki.

== Personal life ==
Little was married to Loretta Donohue for 50 years. Following his 1956 retirement, they lived in Barnstable, Massachusetts and Delray Beach, Florida until her death in 1977. Little died on May 28, 1979, at a nursing home in Delray Beach.

Little was featured on Television Quarterback, an early television program.

== Head coaching record ==
Year	Team	Overall	Conference	Standing	Bowl/playoffs	AP^{#}
Georgetown Blue and Gray / Hoyas (Independent) (1924–1929)
1924	Georgetown	4–4				
1925	Georgetown	9–1				
1926	Georgetown	7–2–1				
1927	Georgetown	8–1				
1928	Georgetown	8–2				
1929	Georgetown	5–2–2				
Georgetown:		41–12–3				
Columbia Lions (Independent) (1930–1955)
1930	Columbia	5–4				
1931	Columbia	7–1–1				
1932	Columbia	7–1–1				
1933	Columbia	8–1			W Rose	
1934	Columbia	7–1				
1935	Columbia	4–4–1				
1936	Columbia	5–3				
1937	Columbia	2–5–2				
1938	Columbia	3–6				
1939	Columbia	2–4–2				
1940	Columbia	5–2–2				20
1941	Columbia	3–5				
1942	Columbia	3–6				
1943	Columbia	0–8				
1944	Columbia	2–6				
1945	Columbia	8–1				20
1946	Columbia	6–3				
1947	Columbia	7–2				20
1948	Columbia	4–5				
1949	Columbia	2–7				
1950	Columbia	4–5				
1951	Columbia	5–3				
1952	Columbia	2–6–1				
1953	Columbia	4–5				
1954	Columbia	1–8				
1955	Columbia	1–8				
Columbia Lions (Ivy League) (1956)
1956	Columbia	3–6	2–5	T–6th		
Columbia:		110–116–10	2–5			
Total:		151–128–13				
^{#}Rankings from final AP Poll.

== See also ==
- List of presidents of the American Football Coaches Association
