= 1933 Montana Grizzlies football team =

American college football season

1933 Montana Grizzlies football
- Conference: Pacific Coast Conference
- Record: 3–4 (0–4 PCC)
- Head coach: Bunny Oakes (3rd season)
- Home stadium: Dornblaser Field

1933 Pacific Coast Conference football standings
	Conf.					Overall
Team	W		L		T	W		L		T
No. 11 Stanford ^ +	4	–	1	–	0	8	–	2	–	1
No. 8 Oregon +	4	–	1	–	0	9	–	1	–	0
No. 6 USC	4	–	1	–	1	10	–	1	–	1
Oregon State	2	–	1	–	1	6	–	2	–	2
Washington State	3	–	3	–	1	5	–	3	–	1
California	2	–	2	–	2	6	–	3	–	2
Washington	3	–	4	–	0	5	–	4	–	0
UCLA	1	–	3	–	1	6	–	4	–	1
Idaho	1	–	4	–	0	4	–	4	–	0
Montana	0	–	4	–	0	3	–	4	–	0
+ – Conference co-champions; ^ – Selected as Rose Bowl representative; Rankings from Dickinson System

Montana played their 1933 conference opener against Oregon State at Bell Field in Corvallis in front of 5,000 fans.

The 1933 Montana Grizzlies football team represented the University of Montana in the 1933 college football season as a member of the Pacific Coast Conference (PCC). The Grizzlies were led by third-year head coach Bunny Oakes, played their home games at Dornblaser Field and finished the season with a record of three wins and four losses (3–4, 0–4 PCC).

== Schedule ==
Date	Opponent	Site	Result	Attendance	Source
September 30	at Oregon State	Bell Field; Corvallis, OR	L 0–20	5,000	
October 14	Washington State	Dornblaser Field; Missoula, MT	L 7–13	6,000	
October 22	vs. Montana State*	Clark Park; Butte, MT (rivalry)	W 32–0	5,500	
October 28	at Idaho	MacLean Field; Moscow, ID (rivalry)	L 6–12		
November 11	at Gonzaga*	Gonzaga Stadium; Spokane, WA	W 13–7		
November 18	at Stanford	Stanford Stadium; Stanford, CA	L 13–26	3,500	
November 30	Utah State*	Dornblaser Field; Missoula, MT	W 26–0	3,200	
*Non-conference game; Source:
