= Iron Men =

Iron Men is a gridiron football term referring to a group of players who play the entire duration of a game on both offense and defense without substitution.

As a popular nickname for famous squads it may refer to:

- 1899 Sewanee Tigers football team
- 1926 Brown Bears football team
- 1933 Oregon State Beavers football team
