= 1933 Idaho Vandals football team =

American college football season

1933 Idaho Vandals football
- Conference: Pacific Coast Conference
- Record: 4–4 (1–4 PCC)
- Head coach: Leo Calland (5th season)
- Home stadium: MacLean Field

1933 Pacific Coast Conference football standings
	Conf.					Overall
Team	W		L		T	W		L		T
No. 11 Stanford ^ +	4	–	1	–	0	8	–	2	–	1
No. 8 Oregon +	4	–	1	–	0	9	–	1	–	0
No. 6 USC	4	–	1	–	1	10	–	1	–	1
Oregon State	2	–	1	–	1	6	–	2	–	2
Washington State	3	–	3	–	1	5	–	3	–	1
California	2	–	2	–	2	6	–	3	–	2
Washington	3	–	4	–	0	5	–	4	–	0
UCLA	1	–	3	–	1	6	–	4	–	1
Idaho	1	–	4	–	0	4	–	4	–	0
Montana	0	–	4	–	0	3	–	4	–	0
+ – Conference co-champions; ^ – Selected as Rose Bowl representative; Rankings from Dickinson System

The 1933 Idaho Vandals football team represented the University of Idaho in the 1933 college football season. The Vandals were led by fifth-year head coach Leo Calland, and were members of the Pacific Coast Conference. Home games were played on campus in Moscow at MacLean Field, with none in Boise this year.

Idaho compiled a 4–4 overall record and lost all but one of its five games in the PCC.

In the Battle of the Palouse with neighbor Washington State, the Vandals suffered a sixth straight loss, falling 6–14 on homecoming in Moscow on November 11. Idaho's most recent win in the series was eight years earlier in 1925 and the next was 21 years away in 1954.

== Schedule ==
Date	Opponent	Site	Result	Attendance	Source
September 30	at Washington	Husky Stadium; Seattle, WA	L 0–13	12,318	
October 7	Whitman*	MacLean Field; Moscow, ID	W 60–0		
October 13	at College of Idaho*	Caldwell Field; Caldwell, ID	W 13–0		
October 20	at Oregon	Hayward Field; Eugene, OR	L 0–19		
October 28	Montana	MacLean Field; Moscow, ID (rivalry)	W 12–6		
November 11	Washington State^{†}	MacLean Field; Moscow, ID (rivalry)	L 6–14	9,000	
November 18	at California	California Memorial Stadium; Berkeley, CA	L 0–6		
November 30	Gonzaga*	Gonzaga Stadium; Spokane, WA (rivalry)	W 20–12	8,500	
*Non-conference game; ^{†}Homecoming; Source:

== All-conference ==
No Vandals were named to the All-Coast team; quarterback Willis Smith was a third team selection.
