= Pyramid Play =

Defensive play in American football

The Pyramid Play is a defensive play in American football, where a defensive player is hoisted up by two other players in an effort to block a place kick attempt by the opposing team. The play was created and implemented by the 1933 Oregon State College team (now known as Oregon State University).

== Origin ==
The play originated as a playful prank during an OSC practice session. While the offense was practicing a place kick, the pranksters decided to try it. Their prank was successful at blocking the kick. This success did not go without notice. OSC's head coach, Lon Stiner, decided that maybe his boys had discovered something and decided to add the play to the team's repertoire. A sort of "climb the ladder" play similar to this was used in the 1916 Cumberland vs. Georgia Tech football game.

== Implementation ==
The Pyramid Play was said to have been first used unsuccessfully in a game on October 28, 1933, against Washington State College (now Washington State University) without much fanfare. The play was used again on November 11, 1933, against the University of Oregon during the annual Civil War game at Multnomah Stadium, now Providence Park. The Beavers had a 6-foot-5-inch (1.96 m) center named Clyde Devine and two 6-foot-2-inch (1.88 m) tackles named Harry Fields and Ade Schwammel. The two tackles hoisted Devine upon their shoulders. With the combination of their height and Devine's long arm span, they succeeded in blocking one of Oregon's two kicks. The play is "probably the most notorious on-field shenanigan" in the history of the Civil War game.

Oregon State also successfully used the play again to help defeat the Fordham Rams 9–6 on November 18, 1933, at the Polo Grounds.

== Publicity ==
Oregon Journal staff photographer Ralph Vincent managed to capture the use of the play in the 1933 Civil War with his Graflex camera. Vincent, his photo, and the Oregon State Beavers were immediately thrust into national attention. The photo quickly appeared in the Saturday Evening Post and other eastern newspapers. Discussion of the play heated up, with sportswriters arguing whether the play was good for the game of football. Some labeled the play a "sports trick".

During World War II, it was reported that Nazi Germany distributed copies of the image around Europe as an example of the "brutality of American sports."

== After effects ==
The NCAA decided to ban the use of the play upon the conclusion of the 1933 season. That ruling is still in effect.
