= Red Franklin =

American football player (1911–1947)

- Red Franklin in 1933

No. 31, 50
- Positions: Running back, defensive back

Personal information
- Born: December 13, 1911; Hope, Rhode Island, U.S.
- Died: May 16, 1947 (aged 35); Linn County, Oregon, U.S.
- Listed height: 5 ft 10 in (1.78 m)
- Listed weight: 163 lb (74 kg)

Career information
- High school: Long Beach Polytechnic (CA)
- College: Oregon State

Career history
- Brooklyn Dodgers (1935–1937)

Awards and highlights
- First-team All-American (1933); First-team All-PCC (1933); Oregon Sports Hall of Fame (1980); Oregon State University Sports Hall of Fame (1991)

Career statistics
- Games played: 15
- Starts: 10
- Rushing yards: 366
- Rushing average: 3.1
- Rushing touchdowns: 4
- Stats at Pro Football Reference

Norman Clifford "Red" Franklin (December 13, 1911 – May 16, 1947) was an American football running back who played in the National Football League (NFL) for the Brooklyn Dodgers from 1935 to 1937. He played college football at Oregon State University, earning All-American honors in 1933 .

== Biography ==
=== Early life ===
Norman Franklin was born December 13, 1911, in Hope, Rhode Island. He attended high school at Long Beach Polytechnic High School in Long Beach, California.

=== College career ===
Franklin was fleet of foot, timed at 9.9 seconds in the 100-yard dash, and played football collegiately for the Oregon State College Beavers. He gained the nickname "Red" from his hair color and was memorably dubbed by one sportswriter "the red-headed riot from Long Beach."

Franklin as a rookie with the Brooklyn Dodgers of the NFL in 1935.

With the departure of OSC star left halfback Harold Moe after the 1932 season, the door was opened for Franklin to step into a starting role in that key position for new head coach Lonnie Stiner. He became the star player of that legendary team, known retrospectively as "The Iron Men" for having battled the two-time national champion and undefeated USC Trojans to a 0–0 tie using just 11 men for the entire 60 minutes of the game. In addition to his skill as a runner and return man, Franklin was highly proficient as a defensive back as well, intercepting two passes in the USC game, including a desperation pass as time expired, sealing the tie for OSC.

Franklin received the highest accolades of his career after this junior season, being named a first team All-Pacific Conference halfback and a first team All-American.

=== Professional career ===
After graduation from Oregon State, Franklin played professionally in the National Football League (NFL) from 1935 to 1937 for the Brooklyn Dodgers, starting 10 games and seeing action in 15, during which time he scored four touchdowns in the league.

=== Later life ===
After leaving the NFL, Franklin operated a grocery store in Lacomb, Oregon, an unincorporated community 10 miles north of Lebanon, Oregon. It was there that he suffered a serious heart attack on May 14, 1947. After three days in the hospital, Franklin succumbed to this health crisis, dying on May 16 at the age of 36.
