= 1933 UCLA Bruins football team =

American college football season

1933 UCLA Bruins football
- Conference: Pacific Coast Conference
- Record: 6–4–1 (1–3–1 PCC)
- Head coach: William H. Spaulding (9th season)
- Home stadium: Los Angeles Memorial Coliseum; Spaulding Field

1933 Pacific Coast Conference football standings
	Conf.					Overall
Team	W		L		T	W		L		T
No. 11 Stanford ^ +	4	–	1	–	0	8	–	2	–	1
No. 8 Oregon +	4	–	1	–	0	9	–	1	–	0
No. 6 USC	4	–	1	–	1	10	–	1	–	1
Oregon State	2	–	1	–	1	6	–	2	–	2
Washington State	3	–	3	–	1	5	–	3	–	1
California	2	–	2	–	2	6	–	3	–	2
Washington	3	–	4	–	0	5	–	4	–	0
UCLA	1	–	3	–	1	6	–	4	–	1
Idaho	1	–	4	–	0	4	–	4	–	0
Montana	0	–	4	–	0	3	–	4	–	0
+ – Conference co-champions; ^ – Selected as Rose Bowl representative; Rankings from Dickinson System

The 1933 UCLA Bruins football team was an American football team that represented the University of California, Los Angeles during the 1933 college football season. In their ninth year under head coach William H. Spaulding, the Bruins compiled a 6–4–1 record (1–3–1 conference) and finished in eighth place in the Pacific Coast Conference, compared to a third-place finish the previous year.

== Schedule ==
Date	Time	Opponent	Site	Result	Attendance	Source
September 23 (Note: Doubleheader)	12:30 p.m.	Los Angeles Junior College reserves*	Spaulding Field; Los Angeles, CA	W 34–0	4,000	
September 23		San Diego State*	Spaulding Field; Los Angeles, CA	W 13–0	4,000	
September 30		at Stanford	Stanford Stadium; Stanford, CA	L 0–3	25,000	
October 6		Utah*	Los Angeles Memorial Coliseum; Los Angeles, CA	W 22–0	15,000	
October 21		Loyola (CA)*	Los Angeles Memorial Coliseum; Los Angeles, CA	W 20–7	30,000	
October 28		Oregon	Los Angeles Memorial Coliseum; Los Angeles, CA	L 0–7	15,000	
November 4		California	Los Angeles Memorial Coliseum; Los Angeles, CA (rivalry)	T 0–0	40,000	
November 11		at San Diego Marines*	San Diego, CA	W 14–13	15,000	
November 18		at Washington	Husky Stadium; Seattle, WA	L 0–10	14,339	
November 25		Saint Mary's*	Los Angeles Memorial Coliseum; Los Angeles, CA	L 14–22	35,000	
November 30		Washington State	Los Angeles Memorial Coliseum; Los Angeles, CA	W 7–0	20,000	
*Non-conference game; All times are in Pacific time
