= 1933 Washington Huskies football team =

American college football season

1933 Washington Huskies football
- Conference: Pacific Coast Conference
- Record: 5–4 (3–4 PCC)
- Head coach: Jimmy Phelan (4th season)
- Captain: Bill Smith
- Home stadium: University of Washington Stadium

1933 Pacific Coast Conference football standings
	Conf.					Overall
Team	W		L		T	W		L		T
No. 11 Stanford ^ +	4	–	1	–	0	8	–	2	–	1
No. 8 Oregon +	4	–	1	–	0	9	–	1	–	0
No. 6 USC	4	–	1	–	1	10	–	1	–	1
Oregon State	2	–	1	–	1	6	–	2	–	2
Washington State	3	–	3	–	1	5	–	3	–	1
California	2	–	2	–	2	6	–	3	–	2
Washington	3	–	4	–	0	5	–	4	–	0
UCLA	1	–	3	–	1	6	–	4	–	1
Idaho	1	–	4	–	0	4	–	4	–	0
Montana	0	–	4	–	0	3	–	4	–	0
+ – Conference co-champions; ^ – Selected as Rose Bowl representative; Rankings from Dickinson System

The 1933 Washington Huskies football team was an American football team that represented the University of Washington during the 1933 college football season. In its fourth season under head coach Jimmy Phelan, the team compiled a 5–4 record, finished in seventh place in the Pacific Coast Conference, and outscored all opponents by a combined total of 88 to 81. Bill Smith was the team captain.

== Schedule ==
Date	Opponent	Site	Result	Attendance	Source
September 23	Gonzaga*	University of Washington Stadium; Seattle, WA	W 13–0	4,411	
September 30	Idaho	University of Washington Stadium; Seattle, WA	W 32–6	12,318	
October 14	Oregon	University of Washington Stadium; Seattle, WA (rivalry)	L 0–6	27,043	
October 21	at Puget Sound*	Tacoma Stadium; Tacoma, WA	W 14–6	4,000	
October 28	Stanford	University of Washington Stadium; Seattle, WA	W 6–0	12,158	
November 11	at California	California Memorial Stadium; Berkeley, CA	L 0–33	40,000	
November 18	UCLA	University of Washington Stadium; Seattle, WA	W 10–0	14,339	
November 25	at Washington State	Rogers Field; Pullman, WA (rivalry)	L 6–17	17,000	
December 9	at USC	Los Angeles Memorial Coliseum; Los Angeles, CA	L 7–13	35,000	
*Non-conference game; Source:
