= 1933 California Golden Bears football team =

American college football season

1933 California Golden Bears football
- Conference: Pacific Coast Conference
- Record: 6–3–2 (2–2–2 PCC)
- Head coach: Bill Ingram (3rd season)
- Home stadium: California Memorial Stadium

1933 Pacific Coast Conference football standings
| | Conf. | | | | | Overall |
| Team | W | | L | | T | W | | L | | T |
|---|---|---|---|---|---|---|---|---|---|---|
| No. 11 Stanford ^ + | 4 | – | 1 | – | 0 | 8 | – | 2 | – | 1 |
| No. 8 Oregon + | 4 | – | 1 | – | 0 | 9 | – | 1 | – | 0 |
| No. 6 USC | 4 | – | 1 | – | 1 | 10 | – | 1 | – | 1 |
| Oregon State | 2 | – | 1 | – | 1 | 6 | – | 2 | – | 2 |
| Washington State | 3 | – | 3 | – | 1 | 5 | – | 3 | – | 1 |
| California | 2 | – | 2 | – | 2 | 6 | – | 3 | – | 2 |
| Washington | 3 | – | 4 | – | 0 | 5 | – | 4 | – | 0 |
| UCLA | 1 | – | 3 | – | 1 | 6 | – | 4 | – | 1 |
| Idaho | 1 | – | 4 | – | 0 | 4 | – | 4 | – | 0 |
| Montana | 0 | – | 4 | – | 0 | 3 | – | 4 | – | 0 |
+ – Conference co-champions; ^ – Selected as Rose Bowl representative; Rankings from Dickinson System

The 1933 California Golden Bears football team was an American football team that represented the University of California, Berkeley during the 1933 college football season. Under head coach Bill Ingram, the team compiled an overall record of 6–3–2 and 2–2–2 in conference.

== Schedule ==
| Date | Opponent | Site | Result | Attendance | Source |
|---|---|---|---|---|---|
| September 23 | Santa Clara* | California Memorial Stadium; Berkeley, CA | L 0–7 | 60,000 | |
| September 30 | Cal Aggies* | California Memorial Stadium; Berkeley, CA | W 39–0 | | |
| September 30 | Nevada* | California Memorial Stadium; Berkeley, CA | W 34–0 | | |
| October 7 | Saint Mary's* | California Memorial Stadium; Berkeley, CA | W 14–13 | 65,000 | |
| October 14 | Olympic Club* | California Memorial Stadium; Berkeley, CA | W 23–0 | 20,000 | |
| October 21 | at Washington State | Rogers Field; Pullman, WA | T 6–6 | 16,000 | |
| October 28 | USC | California Memorial Stadium; Berkeley, CA | L 3–6 | 65,000 | |
| November 4 | at UCLA | Los Angeles Memorial Coliseum; Los Angeles, CA (rivalry) | T 0–0 | 40,000 | |
| November 11 | Washington | California Memorial Stadium; Berkeley, CA | W 33–0 | 40,000 | |
| November 18 | Idaho | California Memorial Stadium; Berkeley, CA | W 6–0 | | |
| November 25 | at Stanford | Stanford Stadium; Stanford, CA (Big Game) | L 3–7 | 88,000 | |
*Non-conference game; Source:
