= 1933 Washington State Cougars football team =

American college football season

1933 Washington State Cougars football
- Conference: Pacific Coast Conference
- Record: 5–3–1 (3–3–1 PCC)
- Head coach: Babe Hollingbery (8th season)
- Captain: Frank Ingram
- Home stadium: Rogers Field

1933 Pacific Coast Conference football standings
	Conf.					Overall
Team	W		L		T	W		L		T
No. 11 Stanford ^ +	4	–	1	–	0	8	–	2	–	1
No. 8 Oregon +	4	–	1	–	0	9	–	1	–	0
No. 6 USC	4	–	1	–	1	10	–	1	–	1
Oregon State	2	–	1	–	1	6	–	2	–	2
Washington State	3	–	3	–	1	5	–	3	–	1
California	2	–	2	–	2	6	–	3	–	2
Washington	3	–	4	–	0	5	–	4	–	0
UCLA	1	–	3	–	1	6	–	4	–	1
Idaho	1	–	4	–	0	4	–	4	–	0
Montana	0	–	4	–	0	3	–	4	–	0
+ – Conference co-champions; ^ – Selected as Rose Bowl representative; Rankings from Dickinson System

The 1933 Washington State Cougars football team was an American football team that represented Washington State College during the 1933 college football season. Eighth-year head coach Babe Hollingbery led the team to a 3–3–1 mark in the Pacific Coast Conference (PCC) and 5–3–1 overall.

The Cougars played their three home games on campus at Rogers Field in Pullman, Washington; two road games were played nearby, in Moscow and Spokane.

Program for the October 28 game against the Oregon State Beavers, held in Portland.

== Schedule ==
Date	Opponent	Site	Result	Attendance	Source
September 30	Puget Sound*	Rogers Field; Pullman, WA	W 56–0	5,000	
October 7	at USC	Los Angeles Memorial Coliseum; Los Angeles, CA	L 0–33	60,000	
October 14	at Montana	Dornblaser Field; Missoula, MT	W 13–7	6,000	
October 21	California	Rogers Field; Pullman, WA	T 6–6	16,000	
October 28	vs. Oregon State	Multnomah Stadium; Portland, OR	L 0–2	10,000	
November 4	at Gonzaga*	Gonzaga Stadium; Spokane, WA	W 16–0	10,000	
November 11	at Idaho	MacLean Field; Moscow, ID (rivalry)	W 14–6	9,000	
November 25	Washington^{†}	Rogers Field; Pullman, WA (rivalry)	W 17–6	17,000	
November 30	at UCLA	Los Angeles Memorial Coliseum; Los Angeles, CA (Thanksgiving)	L 0–7	20,000	
*Non-conference game; ^{†}Homecoming; Source:
