= Tar Schwammel =

American football player (1908–1979)

Ade Schwammel
- Schwammel as an All-American at Oregon State in 1933.

Profile
- Positions: Tackle, placekicker

Personal information
- Born: October 14, 1908; Los Angeles, California, U.S.
- Died: November 18, 1979 (aged 71); Honolulu, Hawaii, U.S.
- Listed height: 6 ft 2 in (1.88 m)
- Listed weight: 225 lb (102 kg)

Career information
- College: Oregon State

Career history
- Green Bay Packers (1934–1936, 1943–1944)

Awards and highlights
- 2× All-Pro (1935, 1936); 2× NFL champion (1936, 1944); First-team All-American (1933); First-team All-PCC (1933); Oregon Sports Hall of Fame (1981); OSU Hall of Fame (1990)

Career statistics
- Games played: 46
- Starts: 29
- Field goals made: 6
- Extra points made: 8
- Stats at Pro Football Reference

Adolphe John "Tar" Schwammel (October 14, 1908 – November 18, 1979) was an American football tackle who played collegiately for the Oregon State Beavers. He was named an All-American in 1933. Schwammel entered the National Football League (NFL) in 1934 and played for five seasons with the Green Bay Packers. He was named a first-team All-Pro in 1935 and named to the second team the next year. He was inducted into the Oregon Sports Hall of Fame in 1981 and the Oregon State University Hall of Fame in 1990, both for his football prowess.

== Early life and college career ==
Adolphe Schwammel was born on October 14, 1908, in Los Angeles, and attended Fremont High School in Oakland, California. He attended Oregon State University where he played for the school's football team. He lettered in football from 1931 through 1933.

Schwammel was a starter on the 1933 Oregon State Beavers football team that played the undefeated two-time national champion USC Trojans to a 0–0 tie using just eleven "Iron Men" for the entire duration of the game. He was named a 1933 College Football All-America Team tackle. Schwammel was one of the key players in the now illegal "Pyramid Play", where the Beavers lifted 6-foot-seven-inch Clyde Devine atop the shoulders of 6-foot-two-inch Schwammel and 6-foot-two-inch teammate Harry Shields to block a placekick. The play was first successfully used in a game against the University of Oregon. A picture of the play published in the Saturday Evening Post brought the team and the play national attention, leading to the pyramid technique being banned by the NCAA's rules committee shortly thereafter. The 1933 OSC team finished with a 6–2–2 record that included a win on the road over Fordham University, during this game, he was injured in his shoulder.

Schwammel was named as the first-team All-American and All-Pacific Coast Conference tackle as a senior in the 1933 season. He was also chosen to play in the 1934 East-West Shrine Game.

== Professional career ==
Schwammel played in the NFL for five seasons with the Green Bay Packers, in two separate stints. He first signed for the Packers in 1934, beginning play with them the same season. He was put on to the first 1935 and the second 1936 NFL All-Pro team. He was a big part of the 1935 victory against the Lions: he scored two field goals, blocked a punt which led to the Packers getting the ball, and scored the game-winning touchdown. He won the 1936 NFL Championship with the Packers. He left after that season and ended up taking a seven-year break from football for military service. He came back to play two more seasons with the team from 1943 to 1944, winning another NFL Championship in 1944. During his time with the team, he also served as a placekicker, scoring six field goals and eight extra points, totaling 26 points. He retired in 1944. During his professional career, he weighed 225 pounds and his height was 6 feet and two inches.

== Personal and later life ==
Schwammel and the other "Iron Men" performed a recreation of the "Pyramid Play" at halftime for a 1958 Oregon State college football game. He was named to the Oregon Sports Hall of Fame in 1981 and the Oregon State University Hall of Fame in 1990, both for his football achievements. Schwammel was married; he died in Honolulu, Hawaii, on November 18, 1979.
