= 1933 Oregon State Beavers football team =

American college football season

1933 Oregon State Beavers football
- Conference: Pacific Coast Conference
- Record: 6–2–2 (2–1–1 PCC)
- Head coach: Lon Stiner (1st season)
- Captain: Don Wagner
- Home stadium: Bell Field

1933 Pacific Coast Conference football standings
	Conf.					Overall
Team	W		L		T	W		L		T
No. 11 Stanford ^ +	4	–	1	–	0	8	–	2	–	1
No. 8 Oregon +	4	–	1	–	0	9	–	1	–	0
No. 6 USC	4	–	1	–	1	10	–	1	–	1
Oregon State	2	–	1	–	1	6	–	2	–	2
Washington State	3	–	3	–	1	5	–	3	–	1
California	2	–	2	–	2	6	–	3	–	2
Washington	3	–	4	–	0	5	–	4	–	0
UCLA	1	–	3	–	1	6	–	4	–	1
Idaho	1	–	4	–	0	4	–	4	–	0
Montana	0	–	4	–	0	3	–	4	–	0
+ – Conference co-champions; ^ – Selected as Rose Bowl representative; Rankings from Dickinson System

The 1933 Oregon State Beavers football team represented Oregon State College in the Pacific Coast Conference (PCC) during the 1933 college football season. This was the 39th year in school history during which intercollegiate football was played. The team played its home games at Bell Field in Corvallis, Oregon and Multnomah Stadium in Portland.

In their first season under head coach Lonnie Stiner, the Beavers compiled a 6–2–2 record (2–1–1 against PCC opponents), good for fourth place in the PCC. Oregon State outscored their opponents, 88 to 48 during the year.

The 1933 Beaver football team is remembered in Oregon sports lore as "The Iron Men". This was for having battled the undefeated USC Trojans to a 0–0 tie, using a squad of just 11 men playing the entire duration of the game.

== Schedule ==
Date	Opponent	Site	Result	Attendance	Source
September 23	Southern Oregon Normal*	Bell Field; Corvallis, OR (Split squad)	W 21–0	"A large crowd..."	
(second game)	Willamette*	Bell Field; Corvallis, OR (Split squad)	W 21–0	(see above)	(see above)
September 30	Montana	Bell Field; Corvallis, OR	W 20–0	5,000	
October 7	Gonzaga*	Multnomah Stadium; Portland, OR	T 0–0	20,000	
October 14	at San Francisco*	Kezar Stadium; San Francisco, CA	W 12–7	3,000	
October 21	USC	Multnomah Stadium; Portland, OR ("Iron Men Game")	T 0–0	21,000*	
October 28	Washington State	Bell Field; Corvallis, OR	W 2–0	10,000	
November 11	vs. Oregon	Multnomah Stadium; Portland, OR (rivalry)	L 3–13	32,183–35,000	
November 18	at Fordham*	Polo Grounds; New York, NY	W 9–6	40,000	
November 30	at Nebraska*	Memorial Stadium; Lincoln, NE	L 0–22	23,092	
*Non-conference game

== Background ==
=== General rules ===
The 1933 college football season was played with rules allowing only limited substitution — the one-platoon system. A player removed from the game could not return for the duration of the quarter in which he was removed. Players consequently played "both ways," alternating on offense and defense until removed due to exhaustion or injury.

=== Tight budget, new coach ===
On January 10, 1933, Paul J. Schissler resigned as Oregon State's head football coach. The roots of the separation were financial rather than performance-related, with chairman of the Oregon State College board of control Harry Rodgers declaring that the school's tenuous financial situation would not permit payment of the annual salary scheduled to be drawn by Coach Schissler.

With the Great Depression negatively impacting college revenues, uniform wage cuts had been ordered by the state board of higher education for all its employees. The 40-year old Schissler had balked at the demand, instead sending the board a copy of the five-year contract he signed in November 1931 calling for payment of a salary of $8,000 a year. When it became clear in conference with the chancellor that the board did not intend to honor this contract, Schissler submitted his resignation, effective June 30, 1933, with the board granting him an immediate paid leave of absence until that date. The board announced no further salary settlement would be made.

Speculation immediately focused on the possible promotion of 30-year-old line coach Lonnie Stiner from Schissler's current staff at lesser salary. Formerly a player at Nebraska and assistant coach at University of Colorado, Stiner had been working as an assistant football coach at Oregon State since 1928. Petitions signed by players circulated on campus in favor of the hiring of Stiner as coach and he was placed in charge of running the team's spring practice. His hiring was formally approved on April 30, 1933, at a salary of $5,500 — discounted to $4,415 due to mandatory cuts.

United Press sportswriter Ben E. Titus, making his way up and down the Pacific coast in anticipation of the 1933 season, predicted that there would be a distinct change of coaching style at OSC under the tutelage of the former star Cornhusker lineman:

"It is quite likely Oregon State will play quite a different game under Stiner," Titus wrote. "Schissler used numerous substitutes. It is said of him that he 'jerked' men so quickly for errors in judgment that he continually had his team so on edge that the men never had self-confidence, always expecting to be taken out for the slightest mistakes. Stiner has indicated he will teach his players the game of football, but will allow them to do the playing."

Beaver tackle Tar Schwammel would be named a 1933 All-American and later play five years for the NFL's Green Bay Packers.

Frank Gorrie of the Associated Press, making a similar preseason West coast tour, quoted Stiner as saying, "We will make our drive with plain, old-fashioned plays, putting aside all the fancy stuff." Stiner felt confident in the quality of his starters, he indicated to Gorrie, regarding as his greatest challenge "finding capable reserves for each position." To this end, it was observed that Oregon State would be fielding a lighter weight team — more capable of enduring long stretches of game play — in 1933.

=== New lineup ===
Oregon State lost 12 varsity lettermen after the 1932 season but returned 19 for the 1933 squad. Critical losses included left halfback Harold Moe, who would play in 1933 for the Chicago Cardinals of the National Football League (NFL), tackle Curly Miller, and end Keith Davis. Stepping into the void at left halfback, traditionally the primary ball-carrier of the Oregon State offense, was to be Norman "Red" Franklin, dubbed by one preseason expert as the "red-headed riot from Long Beach". Franklin had been timed running a blistering 9.9 seconds in the 100-yard dash and was regarded as a "triple threat" out of the single-wing formation — a runner, passer, and receiver.

Returning stars included a pair of tough tackles who would eventually play in the NFL — 205-pound senior "Tar" Schwammel and Hawaiian-born junior Harry Field, a 225-pounder called "meaner than a sick tiger". Hal Pangle, starting halfback on the 1932 squad, was to be moved to quarterback, primarily a blocking position under the single-wing. Another Hawaiian, Pierre Bowman, was to take the reins at starting right halfback.

A total of 50 OSC men turned out for the football team in September 1933, with only one qualified letterman from 1932 deciding to quit the game — left guard Tom Miles. The aspirants were turned into perspirants by coach Stiner and his assistants, put through the paces of two-a-day practices in preparation for the Beavers' season openers, back-to-back games against Southern Oregon Normal School from Ashland and Willamette University of Salem.

== Game summaries ==
=== Southern Oregon Normal, Willamette ===
The Beavers' star left halfback, Norman "Red" Franklin. Franklin would play three years in the NFL.

A split-squad doubleheader pitting OSC against lesser teams from Southern Oregon Normal School — today's Southern Oregon University — and Willamette University was scheduled as the Orangemen's tune-up for the 1933 season. In his head coaching debut, Stiner planned to use two more or less evenly-balanced OSC squads — an "A" squad, with a starting eleven that included 8 returning lettermen, against Southern Oregon Normal, and a "B" squad including 6 returning lettermen against Willamette later in the afternoon. But The best laid schemes o’ Mice an’ Men gang aft agley, and following a first half during which only a safety was scored against Southern Oregon Normal, Stiner found himself inserting players whom he had planned to hold for game two.

The first game was played evenly through three quarters, Southern Oregon Normal proving a surprisingly tough opponent. "They were, big, fast, and knew their football," a reporter for the Corvallis Gazette-Times observed. The 2–0 halftime score stood until the fourth quarter, when the tandem of speedy "Red" Franklin and powerful Hal Joslin finally cracked the wilting SONS defense. Three quick touchdowns were scored, even with a 78-yard run to the end zone by Franklin wiped off the scoreboard by penalty.

In game two it was much the same, with Willamette matching OSC blow-for-blow through three scoreless quarters before coach Stiner was once more forced to put his thumb on the scale, bringing in players he had planned to sit who had already played in the opening tilt. Both games finished with identical scores of 21–0, but Oregon State's thin roster had been placed on public display, with the Beavers unable to dispatch either small school without essentially making use of its full squad.

In the second game, against the Willamette Bearcats, Oregon State had been stymied by a ferocious defense, failing to penetrate the ball beyond the Willamette 17-yard line. Tied 0–0 after three, coach Stiner made a wholesale substitution, with the fresh players overwhelming the tiring Bearcats and finishing a short drive with alternating runs by left half "Red" Franklin and fullback Hal Joslin, who scored. On their next drive the Beavers took to the air, setting up quarterback Harold Pangle for a rushing touchdown. A final touchdown was added with five minutes on the clock on a broken passing play during which the speedy Franklin tucked the ball and made a scrambling dash through traffic from midfield to score standing up.

=== Montana ===
Bell Field in Corvallis would be the location of the 1933 Pacific Coast Conference opener for the Oregon State Beavers. With a special "ladies free" promotion in effect, a healthy crowd estimated at 5,000 assembled — reckoned the largest early season gathering to watch OSC football in years.

Poster promoting the 1933 OSC conference opener at Bell Field in Corvallis.

The Beavers opened the scoring early in the second period, driving the ball with a mixture of runs and passes to the Montana 33 yard line. Left halfback Red Franklin hit quarterback Hal Pangle at the 20-yard line and pangle did the rest, weaving his way through four Grizzlies to score standing up.

Soon after, Franklin nearly scored on a 70-yard punt return, but for the second time in the season the long run was called back by penalty when the Orangemen were flagged for offsides when rushing the punter. The Grizzlies nearly knotted the score when they intercepted an OSC pass deep in the Beavers' end of the field, but on the next play Montana threw and errant pass of their own, which was returned 86 yards by defensive halfback Pierre Bowman to the house. The point after kick was missed and OSC took a 13–0 lead to the locker room at intermission.

After a scoreless third quarter, the home team added a final touchdown when the Beavers marched 69 yards down the field, keyed by a Hal Pangle run up the middle for 20 yards. Pangle finished with a quarterback sneak, adding the point-after for good measure, for a 20–0 Oregon State victory. The Grizzlies managed to control the ball inside the Beavers' 25-yard line three times on the day, but had come away empty, turning the ball over on downs each time.

"The work of Franklin in running and passing, of Joslin in plunging the line, and of Pangle in pass receiving and carrying the ball gave warning that Stiner has a backfield combination to be reckoned with," one observer opined.

The Beavers were 4-for-10 passing for 78 yards in the game, with 143 yards gained rushing, while Montana was 7-for-18 for 86 yards via air, adding just 55 yards on the ground against a tough OSC defensive line.

=== Gonzaga ===
Although they last fielded a team in 1941, Gonzaga University, a small private school located in Spokane, Washington, was historically one of the oldest collegiate football programs on the Pacific coast, dating their first organized game to 1892. The Bulldogs and Beavers crossed paths on the gridiron infrequently, first playing in 1919, but had met four more times after that initial encounter, including a 1932 contest that the Beavers had managed to win with a touchdown in the last minute of play to eke out a 19–16 victory.

A dry field awaited in Portland at Multnomah Stadium for head coach Lonnie Stiner and OSC, with observers regarding the Orangemen as a pre-game favorite by at least a touchdown.

The game was thoroughly dominated by OSC, with Gonzaga only able to cross the midfield stripe twice during the entire contest and neve inside the 30. Oregon State, on the other hand, moved the ball well, only to fumble it away at critical junctures. Twice in the first half the Beavers penetrated the Gonzaga 10-yard line only to up empty — once due to fumble at the goal line by reserve fullback Arnold Heikenen and once turning over the ball on downs at the 8.

The stout Gonzaga defense again held twice inside the 10-yard line in the second half, turning back one effort on downs at the 1-yard line and again when the Beavers controlled the football first-and-goal from the 3. With less than a minute to play, OSC returned a punt to the Gonzaga 35-yard line and quickly moved the ball down to the Gonzaga 4. A potential game-winning kick from chip-shot distance was wide of the goalposts, however, and Gonzaga escaped with a moral victory in a 0–0 tie.

=== San Francisco ===
Program for the October 14 game against the University of San Francisco. A thin crowd estimated at no more than 3,000 saw the game.

Before no more than 3,000 fans, likely the smallest crowd of the season, the Oregon State Beavers took on the University of San Francisco Dons at Kezar Stadium in San Francisco. USF, playing football as an independent, had a 2–6 record the previous year and were coming off two straight losses to open up their 1933 campaign.

Oregon State escaped with a 12–7 victory, with their red-haired, left-handed halfback Norman "Red" Franklin again emerging as the game's star, both as a runner and passer. Franklin made his mark instantly when he took the opening kickoff 95 yards for a touchdown. OSC elected to run a play to add the extra point, but the halfback pass by Franklin fell incomplete, and the 6–0 score held until halftime.

In the third quarter USF took the lead when then blocked a Beaver kick on the OSC 28-yard line and subsequently used multiple runs by reserve fullback Orville Condray to drive into the end zone. The critical extra-point was made and the Dons led 7–6. Midway through the final quarter, with the ball on the USF 32, Franklin took the shotgun snap and took a deep drop and threw the ball deep.

An Associated Press reporter described the scene: "Franklin whipped the ball goalward. It was high and traveling slow, apparently covered by the locals' defense. Harold Pangle, quarterback, leaped into the air, snatching the ball from the outstretched arms of two opponents and when he came to earth his cleats carved their mark in scoring turf.

Pangle's catch provided the winning points in what would be the 12–7 final score.

=== USC ("Iron Men Game") ===
USC's Gordon Clark started at left halfback against the Beavers in 1933.

The University of Southern California Trojans were the greatest powerhouse in college football going into the 1933 season. Consensus college football national champions in both the 1931 and 1932 seasons, the Trojans had won an astounding 20 consecutive games, including the last two editions of the Rose Bowl Game. Ahead of the 1933 season Illustrated Football Annual, a major preseason prognostication magazine of the day, noted that USC had lost only two All-American tackles and an end from its unbeaten 1932 team and asked the question with a two-page layout: "Who'll Stop the Trojans?"

Moreover, through the first five games of 1933, USC had only continued to exert its dominance, running up its unbeaten-and-untied streak to 25 games via four dominant shutouts and a 14–7 win over independent football powerhouse St. Mary's. It was against long odds that the thin and undermanned Beaver team made their way by train to Portland to take on the juggernaut at Memorial Stadium.

What would follow was a game for the ages for Oregon State. A reporter for the Associate Press described the scene:

"A battling, bruising brood of Beavers from Oregon State College gnawed and whittled at the mighty wooden horse of Troy here today, and out tumbled the Trojans of Southern California to submit to a nothing to nothing tie.... A shouting and breathless crowd of 20,000 saw the Beavers turn back the best the Trojans could offer, and saw them achieve it, phenomenally, without making a single substitution. The eleven Orangemen to start were the eleven Orangemen to finish, each with sixty full minutes of play to his credit."

Although scoreless, the game was not even, with USC racking up 16 first downs on the day to just 2 for Oregon State — the first of which came on the Beavers' first play from scrimmage when Red Franklin cut through a gap off right tackle for a 12 yard gain. Six times the Trojans drove the ball in to OSC territory, only to be held short of the end zone by the stout Beaver defense.

Beaver end Vic Curtin was singled out for his excellent defensive play against USC.

Twice during the game USC head coach Howard Jones attempted to exploit the tired Beavers by inserting a completely fresh backfield into the game. Twice the gambit failed as the Oregon State defense rose to the challenge.

In the third quarter, USC managed to march all the way to the OSC 7-yard line, but the ball was on the far right side of the field and there was no angle for a makeable field goal and the Trojans turned the ball over on downs. Then in the fourth USC got the football down to the OSC 5-yard line with the ball only slightly right of center. The decision was made to go for a touchdown, however, and the Beaver defenders held the line once more.

Upon the conclusion of the game, delirious fans swarmed the field, mobbing the eleven exhausted Orangemen who had pulled off what Los Angeles Times staffer Braven Dyer called "as sweet a moral victory as was ever achieved on any gridiron." The goal posts were torn down in celebration in the chaotic aftermath. The game marked the first time since 1930 that USC had been shut out and represented just the second scoreless game for the Trojans since the arrival of head coach Jones in 1925.

Ends Vic Curtin and Woody Joslin were singled out by Dyer for their play anchoring the Beaver defense, while Bowman and Woody's brother Hal were lauded for their effectiveness as linebackers. Harry Field, a "225-pound Hawaiian," was deemed "tougher than a cafeteria steak," while junior center Claude Devine was seen "sorting through to mess up things in generally too frequently for Troy's health." Red Franklin was exceptional in the defensive backfield, picking off one pass and running it back nearly 50 yards and ending the game with another pick of a long pass and return near midfield. He helped hold Southern California to just one completed pass on the day in what was a great defensive team effort.

For the day the Trojans finished with 203 net yards gained, going just 1-for-13 for 21 yards with three interceptions through the air. OSC could muster a mere 70 yards in the game, 48 of which were attributed to the running of Red Franklin. OSC won the turnover battle 4 to 1 and out-punted the Trojans by more than 7 yards per punt, helping the Orangemen stay in the game.

Despite the disappointing result, the traveling Trojans were met at the train depot with a rally and a band. "The game was like a couple automobiles meeting at an intersection," said USC athletic director Willis Hunter. "Southern California and Oregon State hit head-on and nothing but a tie could result. That was all."

=== Washington State ===
Program for the October 28 game against the Washington State Cougars, held in Corvallis at Bell Field.

The October 28 game between Washington State and Oregon State featured running backs Phil Sarboe and Red Franklin, respectively. The game was dominated by defensive play, with Oregon State securing a 2-0 victory through safety scored early in the second quarter.

The first period ended with OSC at midfield and ready to punt the ball. Red Franklin boomed a punt to open the second frame, gathered in by Sarboe at the 12-yard line and returned to the 15. The Cougars were held at bay during their opening possession of the quarter and forced to punt back the ball from deep in their own end. Amidst the mud, center Claude Devine managed to get to the punter from his defensive middle guard position, knocking the back into Washington State's end zone. Hal Joslin attempted to recover the ball for a touchdown, but slid over the end line before gaining possession, thereby recording the safety that would ultimately represent the only points scored in the game.

Highlights were provided by the rival halfbacks, with Sarboe ripping off a 47-yard first quarter scamper before being pulled down on the OSC 28-yard line. For the Beavers, Franklin managed two long kick returns — a long run to near midfield on the opening kickoff and a long run to midfield following the WSC free kick after the safety.

Washington State managed to take the ball to the OSC 17-yard line in the third quarter and lined up for a potential go-ahead field goal. Tar Schwammel and Harry Field were able to get their hands up and block the kick, however, thereby preserving the Beavers' thin lead.

The fourth quarter was played almost completely in the Washington State end of the field, with the teams punting the ball back and forth — the Cougars unable to escape the shadow of their own end zone and the Beavers unable to penetrate inside the 30.

Coach Stiner once again danced with the girl who brung him, playing just 12 men in the contest, with a substitute for seriously injured left guard Bill Tomsheck being the only removal of a starter. Schwammel was so badly hurt with a spinal injury that he was removed from the field on a stretcher.

=== Oregon ===
The annual tilt between Oregon State and the Oregon Webfoots was held on Armistice Day in 1933, explaining the patriotic design of the program.

Still undefeated in conference play, Oregon State entered their final game on the PCC slate, the annual rivalry game with the University of Oregon Webfoots. A capacity crowd of more than 30,000 spectators were on hand at Portland's Multnomah Stadium to see the game. The Beavers were coming off of a bye week and were rested and ready, with tackle Tar Schwammel recovered from his injury from the Washington State game and restored to the starting lineup.

Going into the game, OSC was undefeated in conference play and a victory against Oregon would place them into undisputed possession of first place in the Pacific Coast Conference with no further PCC games remaining on their schedule.

It was Schwammel who put Oregon State on the board first with a field goal in the first period. The kick was set up by an 18-yard Red Franklin run around right end that got the ball down to the Oregon 20. The Beavers were only able to muster 8 yards in the next series, however, setting up Schwammel for his 35-yard kick, sent through the uprights "straight and true."

The lemon-yellow-clad Webfoots were not daunted, however, and in the second period launched a 71-yard scoring drive, marked by six first downs, culminating with a 1 yard touchdown blast by fullback "Iron Mike" Mikulak. The Webfoots converted the point-after for a 7–3 lead that was never surrendered — with the Eugeners adding another touchdown in the final frame on a run by Mark "Roundup" Temple.

Oregon State had their share of chances in the game, with drives stalling on the Oregon 21 and 32 yard lines. In the fourth quarter, the longest play of the game for the Beavers came to nothing when reserve halfback Johnny Biancone caught a pass on his own 21 yard line and raced more than sixty yards down the sideline, only to be tripped up by his own man and fall, leaving the game with a 13–3 final score.

=== Fordam ===
With its conference season completed, Oregon State made a rare cross-country trip by rail to New York City to play the Fordham Rams at the Polo Grounds, home of the New York Giants of National League baseball.

Beaver star Red Franklin scampers for 9 yards against Fordham University at the Polo Grounds.

On a cold day in front of 40,000 fans — the largest crowd to see Oregon State play football in 1933 — Oregon State raced off to a quick lead when Red Franklin took the opening kickoff back 95 yards for a touchdown. The conversion attempt failed.

The maroon-clad Fordham Rams managed to tie the score at the top of the second period when a punt was returned to the Oregon State 45-yard line. A 20-yard pass play helped get Fordham into striking distance, with the Rams working it into a first and goal situation from the 8. After two runs were stopped for no game, a run off-tackle managed to get the ball down to the 1-yard line for a crucial fourth down play. A surge over the right side lead to paydirt. On the extra point, Oregon State used its innovative "pyramid play" in an attempt to block the kick — which sailed askew when the Fordham kicker was distracted.

The 6–6 deadlock was broken later in the second quarter when Tar Schwammel was brought out for a 45-yard field goal attempt, extreme distance for the era. "The pass from center was perfect and Schwammel's direction was just as good," one sportswriter noted. "As the ball headed for the goal posts it was just a question of its carrying powers. It looked for a moment as if it would never retain its height to clear the crossbar, but it just seemed to drift over for the all-important three points that proved to be the margin of victory."

The teams played a fumble-plagued second half to scoreless stalemate and the Beavers escaped with a 9–6 win on the road. The defeat was just the second loss of the season for Fordham.

=== Nebraska ===
With a record of 6–1–2, out of the money in the Pacific Coast Conference race, Oregon State took to the road again for their final game of the season, visiting Lincoln, Nebraska, to take on the Nebraska Cornhuskers. Concluding their season with a loss for the Beavers.

The game was close for three quarters, with Nebraska unable to register a singe first down in the opening frame before scoring a second period touchdown via a pass interference penalty that game the Cornhuskers the ball on the OSC 27. The extra point was missed and the scarlet-clad Nebraska team clung to its tenuous six-point lead.

Momentum appeared to be shifting in Oregon State's direction in the third quarter, with alternating runs by the powerful Hal Joslin and the crafty speedster Red Franklin successfully moving the ball. The Beavers had their chances, with two drives that were first-and-goal inside the Nebraska 10-yard line turned back, through a goal line stand and interception, respectively.

Then in the fourth quarter the game turned decisively for Nebraska. The Cornhuskers returned a Beaver punt 21 yards, down to the OSC 40, before quickly hitting on 17 yard passing play from All-American left halfback George Sauer to right halfback Hubert Boswell. The ball was turned back over the Beavers, however, when a pass fell incomplete in the end zone, resulting in a touchback.

The Beavers were unable to move the ball out of their own end and were forced to punt, with Red Franklin stepping back into punting position. The snap was low and wide, however, shooting past Franklin and out of the back of the end zone for a Nebraska safety and an 8–0 lead. After swapping possessions out of the free kick, the Cornhuskers intercepted a long Franklin pass an proceeded to drive 57 yards on just four plays, capped by a 28-yard run by George Sauer, making the lead 15-zero.

Down three scores with time running out, Oregon State was forced to gamble, leading to another interception. Nebraska made a nearly complete substitution and then proceeded to turn on the speed with a long passing play that took the ball all the way down to the OSC 4-yard line, setting up the final score of what would be recorded as a 22–0 rout. OSC's season was thereby finished — 6 wins, 2 losses, and 2 ties.

== Season highlights ==
Based on the performance of the starting eleven against mighty USC, the 1933 Oregon State football team is remembered to posterity collectively as "The Iron Men."

Oregon State's stout defense gave up just 28 points in the first 9 games of the season — barely over 3 points per contest — before surrendering 22 points in the season-ending rout in Nebraska. Teams failed to score against the Beavers in 6 of their first 7 games.

The speedy "red-headed riot from Long Beach," Norman "Red" Franklin, scored three touchdowns that traversed more than fifty yards — a scramble on a broken passing play from midfield against Willamette and game-opening 95-yard kickoff returns against USF and Fordham. He also had a 78 yard touchdown run in the season opener against Southern Oregon Normal School and a 70 yard punt return against Montana called back by penalty. Franklin would gain national recognition by being named a first team member of the 1933 College Football All-America Team named by the United Press.

Four of the eleven "Iron Men" who battled the mighty USC Trojans to a 0–0 tie in a game played without substitution would later play professionally in the National Football League.

Lon Stiner would remain the head football coach at Oregon State through the 1948 season, compiling a lifetime record of 74–49–17.

== Roster ==
Quarterbacks
• 23 - John Biancone (Senior)
• 28 - Robert Patrick (Sophomore)
• 65 - John Acheson (Junior)
• 67 - Hal Pangle (Junior) * †

Halfbacks
• 3 - Pierre Bowman (Senior) *
• 11 - Edward Makela (Sophomore)
• 13 - James Clarke (Junior)
• 20 - Edward McIntosh (Junior)
• 24 - Norman "Red" Franklin (Junior) * †
• 27 - William Patrick (Sophomore)
• 42 - Joseph Jarvis (Junior)

Fullbacks
• 25 - Arnold Heikenen (Junior)
• 50 - Hal Joslin (Senior) *
• 54 - Marshall Dunkin (Junior)

Ends
• 1 - Milton Campbell (Junior)
• 6 - John Woodard (Junior)
• 16 - Vic Curtin (Senior) *
• 17 - Charles "Woody" Joslin (Sophomore) *
• 33 - A. William Jessup (Sophomore)
• 59 - Maynard Schultz (Sophomore)

Tackles
• 8 - Ade "Tar" Schwammel (Senior) * †
• 29 - Harold Brown (Sophomore)
• 48 - Harry Field (Junior) * †
• 55 - Robert Rushing (Sophomore)
• 60 - Dan Mitola (Junior)

Guards
• 2 - William Tomscheck (Junior) *
• 7 - Stanley Rolfsness (Sophomore)
• 9 - Wilfred Kenna (Senior)
• 21 - Stanley McClurg (Sophomore)
• 38 - John Pitts (Sophomore)
• 45 - Vernon Wedin (Sophomore) *
• 63 - Don Wagner (Senior, captain)
• 64 - John Filipoff (Junior)

Centers
• 5 - Claude Devine (Junior) *
• 32 - Edwin Creider (Sophomore)
• 43 - Willis Danforth (Junior)

Kickers
• Hal Joslin, Hal Pangle

Punters
• Red Franklin

The eleven "Iron Men" who played USC to a tie marked with *
Eventual NFL player marked with †
Sources: Official Program: Oregon State vs. San Francisco, p. 12. Roger Treat, Official NFL Football Encyclopedia (1952), passim.

== See also ==
- Pyramid Play
