= 1933 Oregon Webfoots football team =

American college football season

1933 Oregon Webfoots football

PCC co-champion
- Conference: Pacific Coast Conference
- Record: 9–1 (4–1 PCC)
- Head coach: Prink Callison (2nd season)
- Captain: Bernie Hughes
- Home stadium: Hayward Field

1933 Pacific Coast Conference football standings
| | Conf. | | | | | Overall |
| Team | W | | L | | T | W | | L | | T |
|---|---|---|---|---|---|---|---|---|---|---|
| No. 11 Stanford ^ + | 4 | – | 1 | – | 0 | 8 | – | 2 | – | 1 |
| No. 8 Oregon + | 4 | – | 1 | – | 0 | 9 | – | 1 | – | 0 |
| No. 6 USC | 4 | – | 1 | – | 1 | 10 | – | 1 | – | 1 |
| Oregon State | 2 | – | 1 | – | 1 | 6 | – | 2 | – | 2 |
| Washington State | 3 | – | 3 | – | 1 | 5 | – | 3 | – | 1 |
| California | 2 | – | 2 | – | 2 | 6 | – | 3 | – | 2 |
| Washington | 3 | – | 4 | – | 0 | 5 | – | 4 | – | 0 |
| UCLA | 1 | – | 3 | – | 1 | 6 | – | 4 | – | 1 |
| Idaho | 1 | – | 4 | – | 0 | 4 | – | 4 | – | 0 |
| Montana | 0 | – | 4 | – | 0 | 3 | – | 4 | – | 0 |
+ – Conference co-champions; ^ – Selected as Rose Bowl representative; Rankings from Dickinson System

The 1933 Oregon Webfoots football team represented the University of Oregon during the 1933 college football season. Led by second-year head coach Prink Callison, Oregon finished the season with an overall record of 9–1 and a 4–1 Pacific Coast Conference (PCC) play, tying with Stanford for the conference title.

== Schedule ==
| Date | Opponent | Site | Result | Attendance | Source |
|---|---|---|---|---|---|
| September 22 | Linfield* | Hayward Field; Eugene, OR | W 53–0 | | |
| September 30 | at Gonzaga* | Gonzaga Stadium; Spokane, WA | W 14–0 | 8,000 | |
| October 7 | Columbia (OR)* | Hayward Field; Eugene, OR | W 14–7 | | |
| October 14 | at Washington | Husky Stadium; Seattle, WA (rivalry) | W 6–0 | 27,043 | |
| October 20 | Idaho | Hayward Field; Eugene, OR | W 19–0 | | |
| October 28 | at UCLA | Los Angeles Memorial Coliseum; Los Angeles, CA | W 7–0 | 15,000 | |
| November 4 | Utah* | Hayward Field; Eugene, OR | W 26–7 | | |
| November 11 | vs. Oregon State | Multnomah Stadium; Portland, OR (Civil War) | W 13–3 | 32,183–35,000 | |
| November 18 | at USC | Los Angeles Memorial Coliseum; Los Angeles, CA | L 0–26 | 69,000 | |
| November 30 | at Saint Mary's* | Kezar Stadium; San Francisco, CA (Governors' Trophy Game) | W 13–7 | 30,000 | |
*Non-conference game; Source:

The annual battle between the Webfeet and the Beavers was held on Armistice Day in 1933, explaining the patriotic theme of the game program.
