= Columbia Lions football =

Football program representing Columbia University

| 2026 Columbia Lions football team |
- First season: 1870; 156 years ago
- Athletic director: Peter Pilling
- Head coach: Jon Poppe; 2nd season, 9–11 (.450)
- Location: New York, New York
- Stadium: Robert K. Kraft Field at Lawrence A. Wien Stadium (capacity: 17,000)
- NCAA division: Division I FCS
- Conference: Ivy League
- Colors: Columbia blue and white
- All-time record: 420–706–43 (.378)
- Bowl record: 1–0 (1.000)

National championships
- Claimed: 1875, 1933

Conference championships
- Ivy League: 1961, 2024
- Rivalries: Cornell (rivalry); Fordham (rivalry)

Uniforms
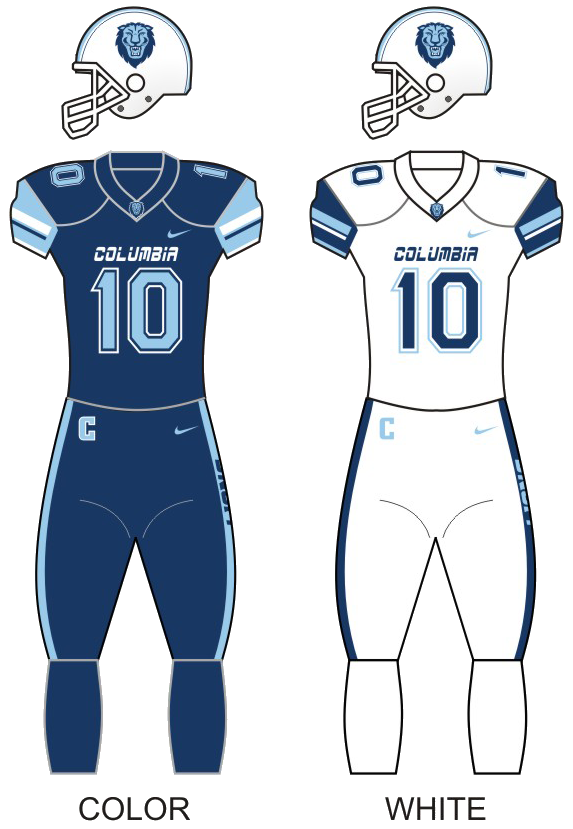
- Fight song: Roar, Lion, Roar
- Mascot: Roar-ee the Lion
- Website: gocolumbialions.com

The Columbia Lions are the college football team representing Columbia University. The team competes in the NCAA Division I Football Championship Subdivision (FCS) as a member of the Ivy League.

Columbia's is the third oldest college football program in the United States, after those of Princeton and Rutgers; Columbia played Rutgers on Nov. 12, 1870, in the fourth intercollegiate football game and first interstate game.

Columbia finished the 2024 season tied with Dartmouth and Harvard for first place in conference play.

Home games are hosted at the 17,000-seat Robert K. Kraft Field at Lawrence A. Wien Stadium in Inwood, Manhattan, the northernmost neighborhood in the island borough of Manhattan.

== History ==
=== Early years (1870–1899) ===
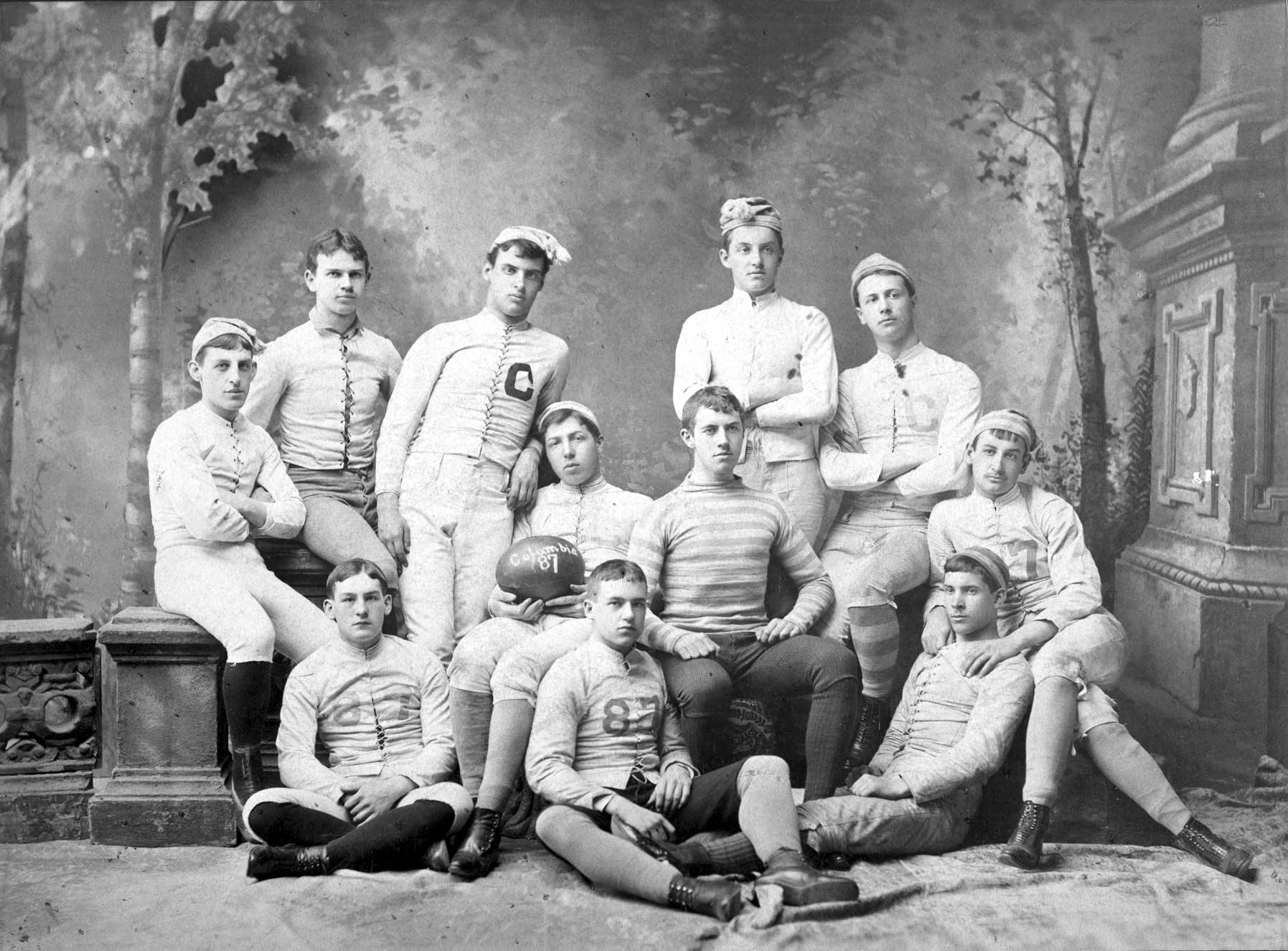
Columbia team of 1887

Some time in early November 1870 – while November 12 is most cited, others claim November 5 or 11th – Columbia's intercollegiate football journey began with a short trip to New Brunswick, New Jersey, to play Rutgers. Columbia lost 3–6 in the first college football game between schools from different states. The school struggled for most of the 19th century. It was not until after the turn of the century that the team would enjoy sustained success.

=== 20th century ===
The program was much more successful in the first half of the 20th century, and was at times a national power. The 1915 squad went undefeated and untied. The 1933 Lions won the Rose Bowl, beating Stanford, 7–0. Lou Little, who coached the team from 1930 to 1956, was inducted into the College Football Hall of Fame in 1960.

=== The Streak ===
Between 1983 and 1988, the team did not have a win in 47 games and lost 44 games in a row, which was the record for the NCAA Football Championship Subdivision until Prairie View A&M broke the record en route to 80 consecutive losses from 1989 to 1998. In the fifth game of the 1983 season, they won 21–18 over Yale. After that game, they did not win a game again for almost five years. The streak began with a tie with Bucknell in the following game, and ending the season with a loss to Holy Cross, a tie with Dartmouth, and losses to Cornell and Brown. The losing streak was so bad, that at one point, when the team came out on the field, the school's band would play the theme to The Mickey Mouse Club rather than their fight song. One notable loss during the streak was in a 1985 game vs. Harvard, where the Lions led 17–0 with 5 minutes left in the 3rd quarter, only to see the Crimson score 7 touchdowns in the remaining time to lose 49–17. With their 35th loss, they set the record for the longest Division I losing streak in history (beating Northwestern's 34 game losing streak from 1979 to 1982).

After this game, Larry McElreavy, the coach at the time told reporters, "I'm realistic; there's not a lot of talent here." ESPN rated the 1983–1988 Lions teams at 4th in its list of the top 10 worst college football teams of all time. The streak was broken on October 8, 1988, with a 16–13 victory over archrival Princeton after a missed field goal attempt by the Tigers late in the game. Matthew Fox most notably played on the '88 team. That was the Lions' first victory at Wien Stadium, which was already four years old, having been opened during the streak.

== Championships ==
=== National championships ===
The 1875 team was retroactively declared co-national champion by Parke H. Davis, along with Harvard and Princeton. The school claims national championships in 1875 and 1933.

| Year | Selector | Coach | Record | Bowl | Result |
|---|---|---|---|---|---|
| 1875 | Parke H. Davis | No coach | 4–1–1 | | |
| 1933 | Self-claimed | Lou Little | 8–1 | Rose Bowl | W 7–0 |

=== Conference championships ===
The Lions have two Ivy League conference titles. They shared the first, in 1961, with Harvard, and the second, in 2024, with Harvard and Dartmouth.

| Year | Conference | Coach | Overall record | Conference record |
|---|---|---|---|---|
| 1961 | Ivy League | Aldo Donelli | 6–3 | 6–1 |
| 2024 | Ivy League | Jon Poppe | 7–3 | 5–2 |

== Bowl games ==
Columbia has appeared in one bowl game and has a record of 1–0.

| Season | Coach | Bowl | Opponent | Result |
|---|---|---|---|---|
| 1933 | Lou Little | Rose Bowl | Stanford | W 7–0 |

== Rivalries ==
=== Cornell ===
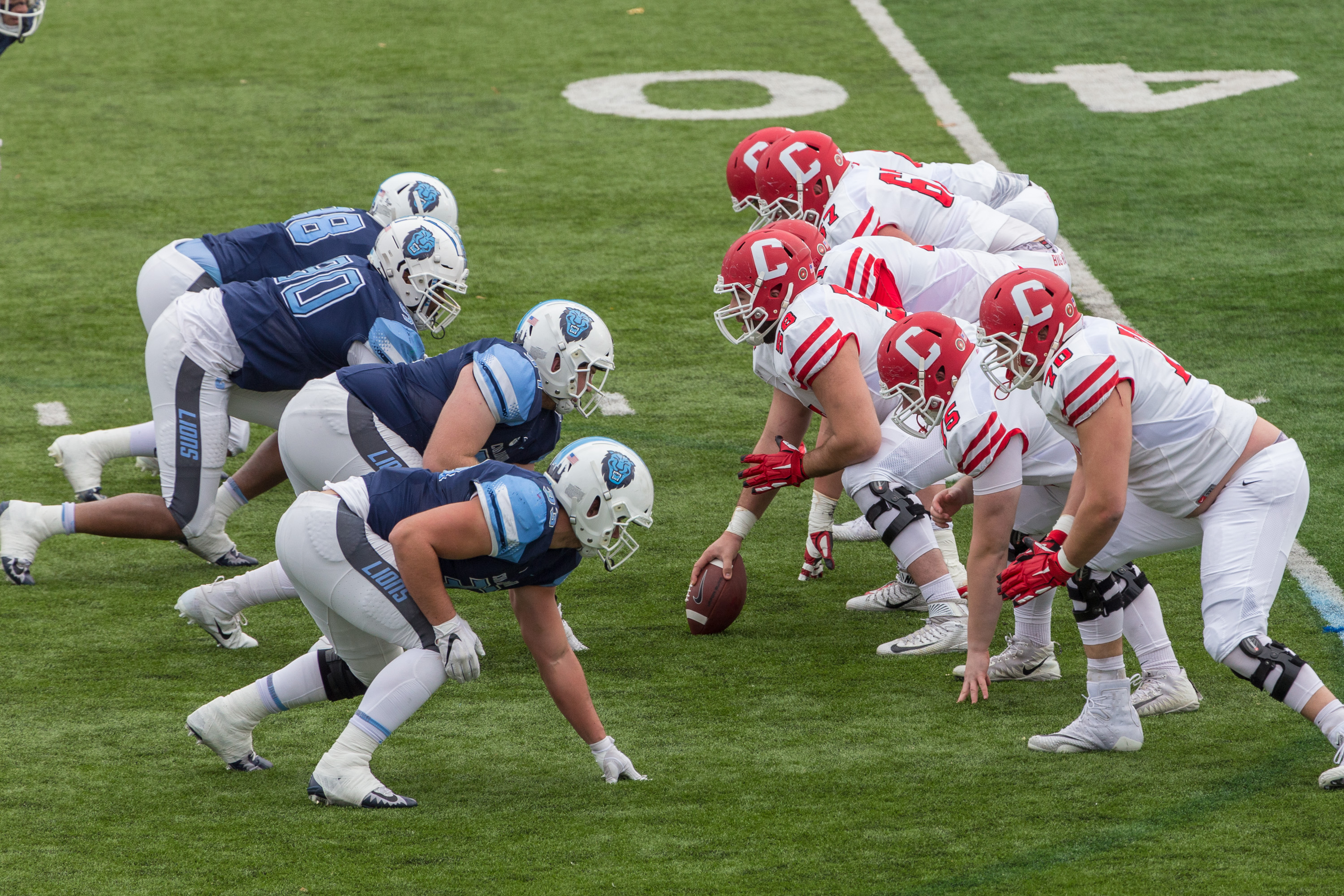
Columbia vs Cornell at Wien Stadium, November 17, 2018

The Columbia Lions and the Cornell Big Red, the two Ivy League teams in New York State, have met 111 times since 1889. They dedicated the Empire State Bowl in 2010. Cornell leads the series 66-42-3. Since 2018, the teams have met on the final weekend of the Ivy League season.

=== Fordham ===
The Columbia Lions and the Fordham Rams, the two largest Division I programs in New York City, met 24 times between 1890 and 2015. After the attacks of Sept. 11, 2001, the universities dedicated the Liberty Cup. Columbia discontinued the series in 2015. The series was tied 12–12.

=== Georgetown ===
The Columbia Lions and the Georgetown Hoyas have met 12 times. Since 2015, the teams have competed for the Lou Little Cup, named for the Hall of Fame coach who coached at both schools. Columbia leads the series 8-4 and the trophy series 5-4.

== Notable players and coaches ==
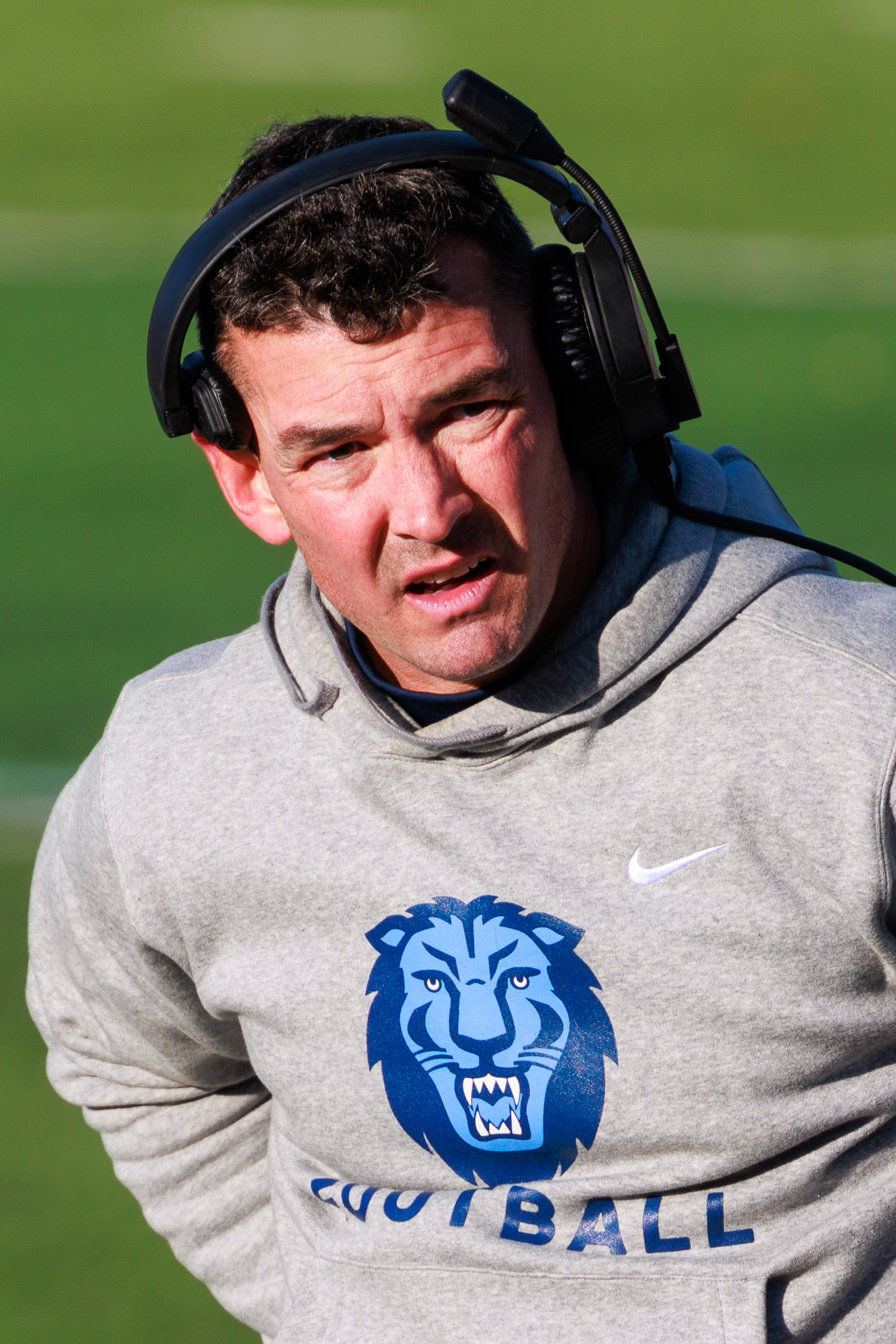
Head coach Jon Poppe

Pro Football Hall of Famer Sid Luckman played his college ball at Columbia, graduating in 1938. Luckman is also in the College Football Hall of Fame. Other Lions to have success in the NFL include offensive lineman George Starke, the Washington Redskins' "Head Hog," during the 1970s and 1980s, quarterback John Witkowski in the 1980s, and defensive lineman Marcellus Wiley in the 1990s. One famous Lion that had limited success on the field but more success in life was writer Jack Kerouac left school and went on the road after one injury-marred season as running back at Columbia. Another Lions back who became legendary for his accomplishments off the gridiron was baseball great Lou Gehrig, who was a two-sport star at Columbia.

=== Pro Football Hall of Fame members ===
| Name | Years | Ref. |
|---|---|---|
| Sid Luckman | 1935–1938 | |

=== College Football Hall of Fame members ===
| Name | Years | Ref. |
|---|---|---|
| Paul Governali | 1940–1942 | 1986 |
| Percy Haughton | 1923–1924 Coach | 1951 |
| Walter Koppisch | 1922–1924 | 1981 |
| Lou Little | 1930–1956 Coach | 1960 |
| Sid Luckman | 1936–1938 | 1960 |
| Cliff Montgomery | 1932–1934 | 1963 |
| Bill Morley | 1899–1901 | 1971 |
| Frank "Buck" O'Neill | 1920–1922 Coach | 1951 |
| George Sanford | 1899–1901 Coach | 1971 |
| Bill Swiacki | 1946–1947 | 1976 |
| Harold Weekes | 1899–1902 | 1954 |

=== Notable players ===
- Jeff Adams
- Steve Cargile
- Tad Crawford
- Marty Domres
- Jason Garrett
- John Garrett
- Paul Governali
- Walter Koppisch
- Sid Luckman
- Josh Martin
- Cliff Montgomery
- Bill Morley
- Cameron Nizialek
- Jeff Otis
- Michael Quarshie
- George Starke
- Harold Weekes
- Marcellus Wiley
- John Witkowski
- Vinnie Yablonski
- Sean Brackett

=== Players notable in other fields ===
Several former players have made successful careers off the football field. Players below became notable in other fields once their football career at Columbia ended. Included are notability outside of football and their position on the team, if known.

- Roy Altman, United States District Judge, quarterback
- Bill Campbell, businessman, offensive lineman
- Eddie Collins, pro baseball player and manager, quarterback
- Brian Dennehy, actor, offensive lineman
- "Wild Bill" Donovan, politician and Army general, quarterback
- Matthew Fox, actor, wide receiver
- Lou Gehrig, baseball player, fullback
- Ed Harris, actor
- Eric Holder, former US Attorney General
- Matt Kaplan, film producer, quarterback
- Jack Kerouac, novelist, running back

== Future non-conference opponents ==
Announced schedules as of December 3, 2025.

| 2026 | 2027 |
|---|---|
| Lafayette | at Lafayette |
| at Georgetown | |
| at Marist | |
