= Prink Callison =

American football player and coach (1899–1986)

Biographical details
- Born: August 15, 1899
- Died: June 17, 1986 (aged 86); Laguna Hills, California, U.S.

Playing career
- 1920–1922: Oregon
- Position: Center

Coaching career (HC unless noted)
- 1932–1937: Oregon

Head coaching record
- Overall: 33–23–2 (college)

Accomplishments and honors

Championships
- 1 PCC (1933)

Awards
- First-team All-PCC (1922)

Prince Gary "Prink" Callison (August 15, 1899 – June 17, 1986) was an American football player and coach. He served as the head coach at the University of Oregon from 1932 to 1937, compiling a record of 33–23–2. In 1933, Callison led the program to its second championship of the Pacific Coast Conference.

== Early career ==
Callison played college football at Oregon from 1920 to 1922. He then became the head football and basketball coach at Medford High School, leading the boys' basketball team to Oregon state championships in 1924 and 1929.

== Head coach at Oregon ==
The Ducks hired Callison in 1932. In 1933, he coached the Ducks to a 9–1 record and a tie for the Pacific Coast Conference championship with Stanford. Since the two schools did not meet head-to-head, the decision of which team would play in the Rose Bowl had to be made by the committee. They chose Stanford, on the strength of the school's victory over USC, the only team to have beaten Oregon that year. 1933 was Callison's best year as the Ducks finished no higher than fourth in the next four seasons. He resigned after the 1937 season.

== Legacy and death ==
Callison died in Laguna Hills, California in 1986. He had been named to the Oregon Sports Hall of Fame in 1981.

== Head coaching record ==
=== College ===
Year	Team	Overall	Conference	Standing	Bowl/playoffs
Oregon Webfoots (Pacific Coast Conference) (1932–1937)
1932	Oregon	6–3–1	2–2–1	T–5th	
1933	Oregon	9–1	4–1	T–1st	
1934	Oregon	6–4	4–2	4th	
1935	Oregon	6–3	3–2	T–4th	
1936	Oregon	2–6–1	1–5–1	8th	
1937	Oregon	4–6	2–5	8th	
Oregon:		33–23–2	16–17–2		
Total:		33–23–2			
National championship Conference title Conference division title or championship game berth
