= Tiny Thornhill =

American football player and coach (1893–1956)

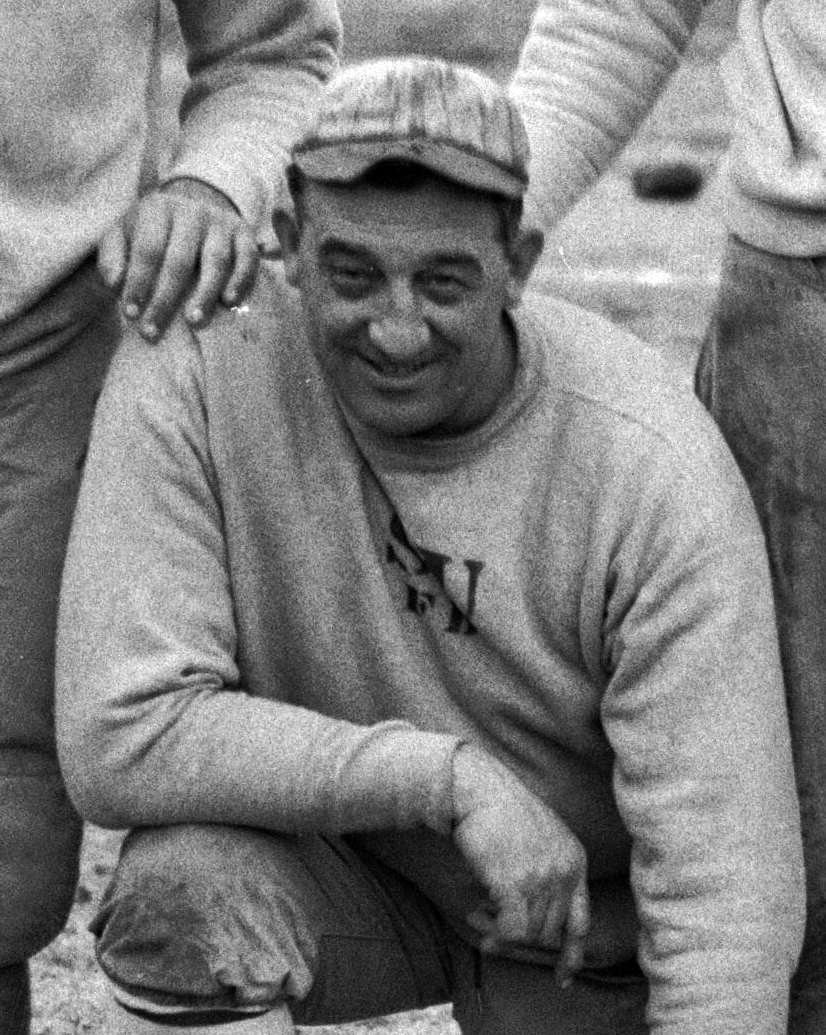
- Thornhill in 1934

Biographical details
- Born: April 14, 1893; Richmond, Virginia, U.S.
- Died: June 30, 1956 (aged 63); Berkeley, California, U.S.

Playing career
- 1913–1916: Pittsburgh
- 1917–1919: Massillon Tigers
- 1920: Cleveland Tigers
- 1920: Buffalo All-Americans
- Positions: Tackle, guard

Coaching career (HC unless noted)
- 1917: Pittsburgh (assistant)
- 1921: Centre (line)
- 1922–1932: Stanford (line)
- 1933–1939: Stanford

Head coaching record
- Overall: 35–25–7

Accomplishments and honors

Championships
- National (1916)

Awards
- First-team All-American (1916)

Claude Earl "Tiny" Thornhill (April 14, 1893 – June 30, 1956) was an All-American college football player at Pittsburgh and the head football coach at Stanford from 1933 to 1939.

== Early life and college career ==
Claude E. Thornhill was born in 1893 in Richmond, Virginia. At the age of six, the family moved to West Virginia. He then contracted scarlet fever and was confined to a wheelchair for 17 months. He was told by doctors that he was paralyzed in both legs and would not be able to walk for years. He moved with his family to Beaver, Pennsylvania, at a young age.

Thornhill played college football at the University of Pittsburgh under legendary coach Glenn "Pop" Warner. An All-American guard and tackle, Thornhill was given the ironic nickname "Tiny" due to his imposing size. Following his graduation from Pitt, Tiny became an assistant coach to Pop Warner but left midway through the season to play pro football with the Massillon Tigers, with teammates that included Knute Rockne, Jock Sutherland, Gus Dorais, Bob Higgins, and Bob Peck. He also played in the first-ever National Football League season in 1920 for the Cleveland Tigers and Buffalo All-Americans.

== Coaching career ==
After leaving pro football, Thornhill returned to Pitt as an assistant coach to Warner. In 1922, Warner accepted the head coaching position at Stanford, but as he had two years to finish his contract at Pitt, sent Thornhill and Andrew Kerr ahead to coach Stanford in preparation of his arrival in 1924.

Thornhill served as offensive line coach under Warner until 1933, when Warner left Stanford to take the head coaching job at Temple University and Thornhill was named head coach. In his first three years, members of the class of 1936—nicknamed the Vow Boys due to their promise never to lose to USC—played in the Rose Bowl Game each season. Thornhill was the first Stanford coach to lead his team to postseason play in his first three seasons, a feat not matched until David Shaw's 2011 to 2013 teams. Stanford lost the first two Rose Bowl appearances, but won the 1936 Rose Bowl over SMU, 7–0.

After the first three seasons, Thornhill's teams went steadily downhill, culminating in a 1–7–1 season in 1939, after which Thornhill was fired and replaced by Clark Shaughnessy.

Thornhill died in Berkeley, California, in 1956 of a heart ailment. He was buried in Golden Gate National Cemetery. He was inducted into the Beaver County Sports Hall of Fame in 1978.

== Head coaching record ==
Year	Team	Overall	Conference	Standing	Bowl/playoffs	AP^{#}
Stanford Indians (Pacific Coast Conference) (1933–1939)
1933	Stanford	8–2–1	4–1	T–1st	L Rose	
1934	Stanford	9–1–1	5–0	1st	L Rose	4
1935	Stanford	8–1	4–1	T–1st	W Rose	
1936	Stanford	2–5–2	2–3–2	6th		
1937	Stanford	4–3–2	4–2–1	2nd		
1938	Stanford	3–6	2–5	8th		
1939	Stanford	1–7–1	0–6–1	9th		
Stanford:		35–25–7	21–18–4			
Total:		35–25–7				
National championship Conference title Conference division title or championship game berth
^{#}AP Poll.
