= Cliff Montgomery =

American football player (1910–2005)

- Montgomery in 1932

No. 33
- Positions: Quarterback, halfback

Personal information
- Born: September 17, 1910; Pittsburgh, Pennsylvania, U.S.
- Died: April 21, 2005 (aged 94); Mineola, New York, U.S.
- Listed height: 5 ft 9 in (1.75 m)
- Listed weight: 165 lb (75 kg)

Career information
- High school: Har-Brack Union (Brackenridge, Pennsylvania); The Kiski School (Saltsburg, Pennsylvania)
- College: Columbia (1931–1933)

Career history
- Brooklyn Dodgers (1934)

Awards and highlights
- 2× First-team All-Eastern (1932, 1933); Rose Bowl MVP (1934); Rose Bowl champion

Career statistics
- Games played: 11
- Starts: 3
- Stats at Pro Football Reference
- College Football Hall of Fame

Cliff Montgomery (September 17, 1910 – April 21, 2005) was an American football player.

== College career ==
He served as the captain of the Columbia Lions football team that won the 1934 Rose Bowl Game. Montgomery, the quarterback, called a hidden-ball trick play known as KF-79 that led to Columbia's 7–0 upset over Stanford University. It was widely regarded as one of the greatest athletic upsets of the twentieth century, and Montgomery was named the game's most valuable player.

== Professional career ==
Montgomery went on to play for one season with the Brooklyn Dodgers of the National Football League (NFL), seeing action in 11 games and starting 3 times.

== Later life ==
Montgomery served with the United States Navy during World War II. He earned the Silver Star during the 1945 invasion of Okinawa, credited with saving the lives of 400 sailors on April 6, 1945, when he navigated his flagship alongside a burning destroyer in rough seas.

An executive at McGraw Hill, Montgomery spent 25 years as a college football official and earned a spot in the College Football Hall of Fame.

== See also ==
- List of Columbia University people
