= 1933 Stanford Indians football team =

American college football season

1933 Stanford Indians football

PCC co-champion

Rose Bowl, L 0–7 vs. Columbia
- Conference: Pacific Coast Conference
- Record: 8–2–1 (4–1 PCC)
- Head coach: Tiny Thornhill (1st season)
- Home stadium: Stanford Stadium

1933 Pacific Coast Conference football standings
	Conf.					Overall
Team	W		L		T	W		L		T
No. 11 Stanford ^ +	4	–	1	–	0	8	–	2	–	1
No. 8 Oregon +	4	–	1	–	0	9	–	1	–	0
No. 6 USC	4	–	1	–	1	10	–	1	–	1
Oregon State	2	–	1	–	1	6	–	2	–	2
Washington State	3	–	3	–	1	5	–	3	–	1
California	2	–	2	–	2	6	–	3	–	2
Washington	3	–	4	–	0	5	–	4	–	0
UCLA	1	–	3	–	1	6	–	4	–	1
Idaho	1	–	4	–	0	4	–	4	–	0
Montana	0	–	4	–	0	3	–	4	–	0
+ – Conference co-champions; ^ – Selected as Rose Bowl representative; Rankings from Dickinson System

The 1933 Stanford Indians football team represented Stanford University as a member of the Pacific Coast Conference (PCC) during the 1933 college football season. Led by first-year head coach Tiny Thornhill, the Indians compiled an overall record of 8–2–1 with a mark of 4–1 in conference play, sharing the PCC title with Oregon. Stanford was invited to the Rose Bowl, where Indians lost to Columbia. The team played home games at Stanford Stadium in Stanford, California.

== Schedule ==
Date	Opponent	Site	Result	Attendance	Source
September 23	San Jose State*	Stanford Stadium; Stanford, CA (rivalry)	W 27–0		
September 30	UCLA	Stanford Stadium; Stanford, CA	W 3–0	25,000	
October 7	Santa Clara*	Stanford Stadium; Stanford, CA	W 7–0	35,000	
October 14	vs. Northwestern*	Soldier Field; Chicago, IL	T 0–0	28,000	
October 21	San Francisco*	Stanford Stadium; Stanford, CA	W 20–13		
October 28	at Washington	Husky Stadium; Seattle, WA	L 0–6	12,158	
November 4	Olympic Club*	Stanford Stadium; Stanford, CA	W 21–0	6,000	
November 11	at USC	Los Angeles Memorial Coliseum; Los Angeles, CA (rivalry)	W 13–7	95,000	
November 18	Montana	Stanford Stadium; Stanford, CA	W 33–7	3,500	
November 25	California	Stanford Stadium; Stanford, CA (Big Game)	W 7–3	88,000	
January 1, 1934	vs. Columbia*	Rose Bowl; Pasadena, CA (Rose Bowl)	L 0–7	40,000	
*Non-conference game; Source:

== Season summary ==
In head coach Claude E. Thornhill's first season, the Indians allowed only 36 points during the entire regular season and logged four shutout victories. The team was Pacific Coast Conference co-champions with Oregon and was selected to represent the conference in the Rose Bowl.

=== Vow Boys ===
After the prior season's devastating loss to rival USC, Stanford's freshmen football players, led by quarterback Frank Alustiza, vowed never again to lose to the Trojans. The "Vow Boys", as they and their team were called, kept the vow for their three varsity seasons, beginning with a 13–7 road victory over the 1933 USC team. The game was USC's first loss in 27 contests, and Stanford's victory paved their way to the Rose Bowl.

=== 1934 Rose Bowl ===
Heavy favorites in the Rose Bowl against Columbia, the Indians, led by quarterback Alustiza and fullback Grayson, dominated the line of scrimmage, with Grayson rushing for 152 yards on 28 carries, more than the entire Columbia team. However, eight fumbles and a stiff goal line defense by Columbia kept Stanford from scoring, and the lone score, in a hidden ball play, gave the Lions the upset.
