= Lon Stiner =

American football player and coach (1903–1985)

- Stiner in 1940

Biographical details
- Born: June 20, 1903; Hastings, Nebraska, U.S.
- Died: March 8, 1985 (aged 81); Richland, Washington, U.S.

Playing career
- 1923–1926: Nebraska
- Position: Tackle

Coaching career (HC unless noted)
- 1928–1932: Oregon State (assistant)
- 1933–1948: Oregon State

Head coaching record
- Overall: 74–49–17
- Bowls: 3–0

Accomplishments and honors

Championships
- 1 PCC (1941)

Awards
- First-team All-American (1926); First-team All-MVC (1926)

Alonzo L. "Lon" Stiner (June 20, 1903 – March 8, 1985) was an American college football player and coach. He was the head coach at Oregon State College—now Oregon State University—from 1933 to 1948, compiling a record of 74–49–17. Stiner led the Oregon State Beavers to the Pacific Coast Conference (PCC) title in 1941 and the three bowl game victories.

== Early life ==
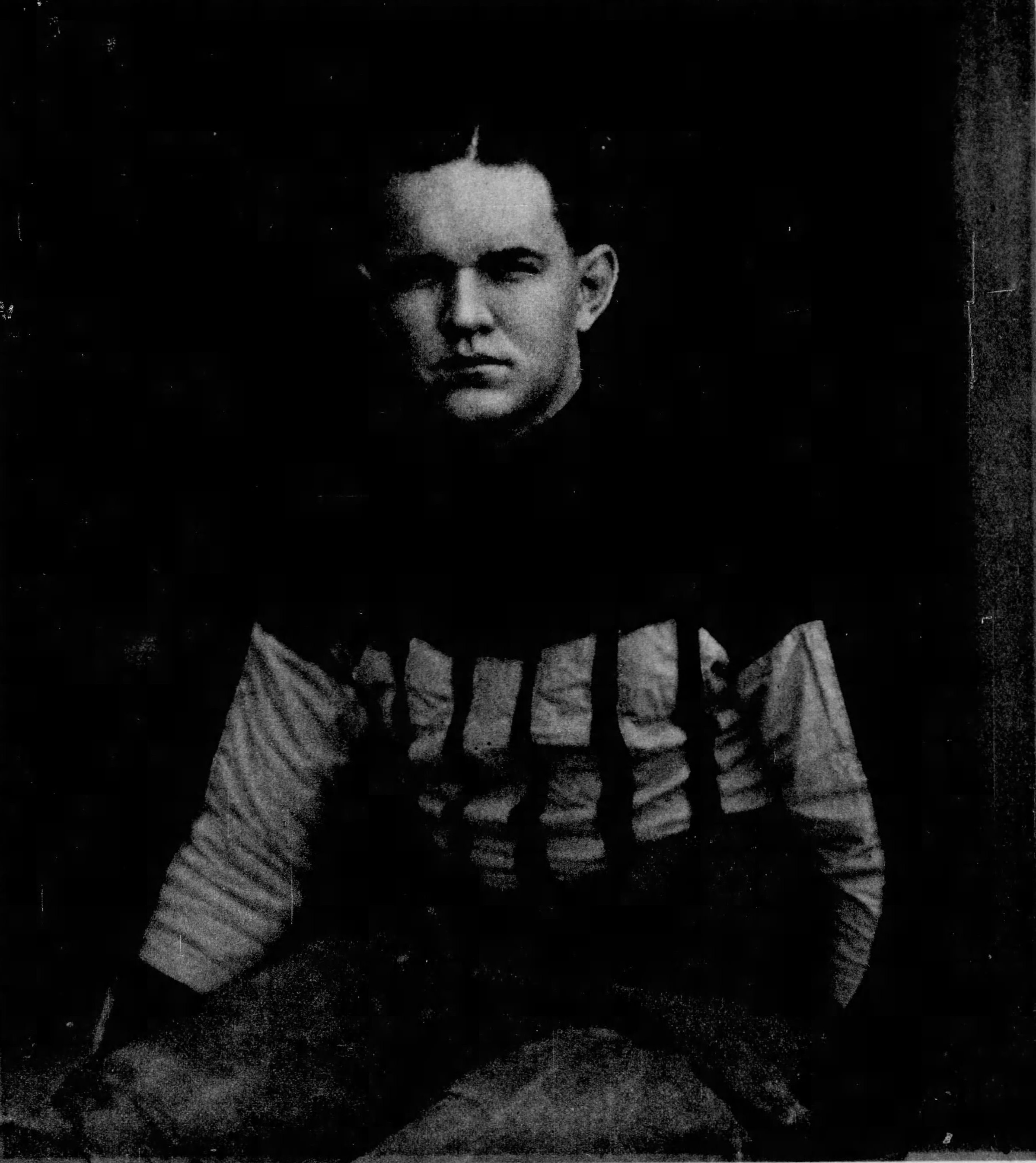
Stiner in 1926

Lon Stiner was born June 20, 1903, at Hastings, Nebraska. He attended Lombard College of Galesburg, Illinois in 1922 and 1923, transferring in 1924 to the University of Nebraska in Lincoln.

After sitting out a year, Stiner played tackle for the Cornhuskers in 1925 and 1926. During the 1925 season he was part of the Nebraska team that shut out the highly rated University of Illinois team featuring star running back Red Grange.

He was selected as captain of the 1926 Nebraska team as a senior and garnered All-America honors.

== Coaching career ==
In the fall of 1927, Stiner accepted a post at the University of Colorado as an assistant coach of football and track and field. He accepted a similar position at Oregon State College in the fall of 1928, coaching the linemen of the freshman team, as well as serving as head coach of track.

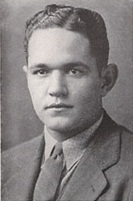
Stiner in 1927

Budgetary problems associated with the Great Depression forced the departure of head coach Paul Schissler in January 1933, opening the door for the promotion of Stiner, which was actively sought by returning players on the team. Stiner was quickly recognized as heir-apparent and was placed in charge of the Beavers' spring 1933 football practices. Stiner was officially approved as head football coach of the Beavers by the Oregon state board of higher education on April 29, 1933.

During his tenure as head football coach of Oregon State, Stiner compiled a 74–49–17 record, setting school records for wins, and winning percentage (.589). His best season came in 1939, when his team went 9–1–1 and won the Pineapple Bowl over Hawaii, 39–6.

=== "Iron Men" Game ===
Stiner coached in one of the greatest upset ties in NCAA history. On October 21, 1933, eleven Beaver "Iron Men" fought USC to a scoreless tie in what many consider to be the greatest game in Oregon State football history. The Trojans, defending two-time national champions, brought an eighty-man squad to Multnomah Stadium in Portland and saw a 25-game win streak splattered by the Beavers. The Beavers did not make a substitution, playing only eleven men, each of whom played both ways for the entire sixty minutes.

=== 1942 Rose Bowl ===
Stiner was also the head coach of another famous game in Beaver football history. His 1941 team played in the Rose Bowl. This game produced two important firsts. It was OSU's first-ever trip to the famous New Year's Day classic, and it remains the only Rose Bowl ever played outside of Pasadena, California. The reason for the move out of Pasadena was due to the attack on Pearl Harbor in December 1941. The game was played at Duke University's Wallace Wade Stadium in Durham, North Carolina, with the undefeated Blue Devils picked as 3–1 favorites. Oregon State pulled off the upset and won, 20–16. Stiner, at 38, was the youngest head coach in Rose Bowl history.

=== The Pyramid Play ===
Stiner also played a key role in another famous first in football history. The pyramid play, used in blocking kicks, originated as a prank at practice. Amazingly enough, the play was successful in blocking a kick. Stiner, upon noticing the success of the play, decided to attempt it in a game. The play consisted of hoisting the 6 ft 5 in (1.96 m) center, Clyde Devine, onto the shoulders of 6 ft 2 in (1.88 m) tackles Harry Fields and Ade Schwammel. At this height in the air, Devine could reach out and knock down any ball headed for the goal posts.

The first official use of the play was successfully executed against the University of Oregon in Multnomah Stadium in Portland. The Pyramid was banned by the NCAA rules committee within a year.

Despite going 5–4–3 and taking his team to the 1949 Pineapple Bowl after the 1948 season, Stiner resigned in March, and was succeeded by Kip Taylor in 1949. Stiner was 3–0 in bowl appearances.

== After football ==
Stiner then worked as a labor relations representative for Edward Hines Lumber Company at Westfir, Oregon. When he retired in 1968, he and his wife Caroline moved to Woodburn; Caroline died in 1972.

== Death and legacy ==
Stiner moved to an assisted living facility in Richland, Washington, around 1976, where he spent the last eight years of his life, to be near his daughter, Betty Ingram. Stiner suffered ill health for the last year of his life. Stiner was survived by a son, Alonzo P. "Lon" Stiner, an attorney in Portland, and six grandchildren. Memorial services were held at Riverview Abbey Chapel in Portland.

Stiner coached 140 games for Oregon State, the second greatest number of games by any individual. Only Mike Riley (1997–1998; 2003–2014) has coached more games — 173.

Stiner is an inductee of the Oregon Sports Hall of Fame.

== Head coaching record ==
Year	Team	Overall	Conference	Standing	Bowl/playoffs	AP^{#}
Oregon State Beavers (Pacific Coast Conference) (1933–1948)
1933	Oregon State	6–2–2	2–1–1	4th		
1934	Oregon State	3–6–2	0–5–2	9th		
1935	Oregon State	6–4–1	2–3–1	7th		
1936	Oregon State	4–6	3–5	6th		
1937	Oregon State	3–3–3	2–3–3	6th		
1938	Oregon State	5–3–1	4–3–1	T–3rd		
1939	Oregon State	9–1–1	6–1–1	3rd	W Pineapple	
1940	Oregon State	5–3–1	4–3–1	3rd		
1941	Oregon State	8–2	7–2	1st	W Rose	12
1942	Oregon State	4–5–1	4–4	5th		
1943	No team–World War II					
1944	No team–World War II					
1945	Oregon State	4–4–1	4–4	4th		
1946	Oregon State	7–1–1	6–1–1	2nd		
1947	Oregon State	5–5	3–4	6th		
1948	Oregon State	5–4–3	2–3–2	6th	W Pineapple	
Oregon State:		74–49–17	49–42–13			
Total:		74–49–17				
National championship Conference title Conference division title or championship game berth
^{#}Rankings from final AP Poll.
