= 1933 USC Trojans football team =

American college football season

1933 USC Trojans football

National champion (Williamson)
- Conference: Pacific Coast Conference
- Record: 10–1–1 (4–1–1 PCC)
- Head coach: Howard Jones (9th season)
- Offensive scheme: Single-wing
- Captain: Ford Palmer
- Home stadium: Los Angeles Memorial Coliseum

1933 Pacific Coast Conference football standings
	Conf.					Overall
Team	W		L		T	W		L		T
No. 11 Stanford ^ +	4	–	1	–	0	8	–	2	–	1
No. 8 Oregon +	4	–	1	–	0	9	–	1	–	0
No. 6 USC	4	–	1	–	1	10	–	1	–	1
Oregon State	2	–	1	–	1	6	–	2	–	2
Washington State	3	–	3	–	1	5	–	3	–	1
California	2	–	2	–	2	6	–	3	–	2
Washington	3	–	4	–	0	5	–	4	–	0
UCLA	1	–	3	–	1	6	–	4	–	1
Idaho	1	–	4	–	0	4	–	4	–	0
Montana	0	–	4	–	0	3	–	4	–	0
+ – Conference co-champions; ^ – Selected as Rose Bowl representative; Rankings from Dickinson System

The 1933 USC Trojans football team represented the University of Southern California (USC) in the 1933 college football season. In their ninth year under head coach Howard Jones, the Trojans compiled a 10–1–1 record (4–1–1 against conference opponents), finished in third place in the Pacific Coast Conference, and outscored their opponents by a combined total of 257 to 30.

End Ford Palmer was elected captain of the 1933 Trojan team.

== Schedule ==
Date	Opponent	Site	Result	Attendance	Source
September 23	Occidental*	Los Angeles Memorial Coliseum; Los Angeles, CA	W 39–0	35,000	
September 23	Whittier*	Los Angeles Memorial Coliseum; Los Angeles, CA	W 51–0	35,000	
September 30	Loyola (CA)*	Los Angeles Memorial Coliseum; Los Angeles, CA	W 18–0	65,000	
October 7	Washington State	Los Angeles Memorial Coliseum; Los Angeles, CA	W 33–0	60,000	
October 14	Saint Mary's*	Los Angeles Memorial Coliseum; Los Angeles, CA	W 14–7	80,000–85,000	
October 21	at Oregon State	Multnomah Field; Portland, OR	T 0–0	21,000	
October 28	at California	California Memorial Stadium; Berkeley, CA	W 6–3	65,000	
November 11	Stanford	Los Angeles Memorial Coliseum; Los Angeles, CA (rivalry)	L 7–13	95,000	
November 18	Oregon	Los Angeles Memorial Coliseum; Los Angeles, CA	W 26–0	69,000	
November 25	at Notre Dame*	Notre Dame Stadium; Notre Dame, IN (rivalry)	W 19–0	25,037	
December 2	Georgia*	Los Angeles Memorial Coliseum; Los Angeles, CA	W 31–0	45,000	
December 9	Washington^{†}	Los Angeles Memorial Coliseum; Los Angeles, CA	W 13–7	35,000	
*Non-conference game; ^{†}Homecoming; Source:

== Game summaries ==
=== Washington State ===
- Cotton Warburton 14 rushes, 221 yards

== Roster ==
- Oliver Bardin, G
- Francis Beard, G
- Julius Bescos, E
- Kenneth Bright, HB
- Ward Browning, E
- Gerald Burchard, HB
- Rodney Cameron, QB
- Cal Clemens, HB
- Alvie Coughlin, T
- Art Dittberner, T
- William Dye, G
- Bob Fuhrer, E
- Homer Griffith, QB
- William King Hall, C
- David Harlan, T
- Hueston Harper, T
- Jack W. Houlgate, C
- William N. Howard, QB
- Joe Hurst, E
- George Lady, T
- Duane Larrabee, E
- Robert Love, E
- Garland Matthews, QB
- Bob McNeish, HB
- Gerald Ostling, E
- James Owens, QB
- Alfred Poulsen, C
- Cliff Propst, FB
- Al Reboin, HB
- Gene Ridings, FB
- Aaron Rosenberg, G
- John Seixas, E
- Kenneth Shannon, HB
- Lawrence Stevens, G
- Herbert Tatsch, T
- Cotton Warburton, QB
- James Webb, HB
- Frank Williamson, G
- Jack Williamson
- Haskell Robert "Inky" Wotkyns, FB
- Curt Youel, C
