= 1934 Rose Bowl =

American college football game

- 20th Rose Bowl Game
Columbia Lions	Stanford Indians
(7–1)	(8–1–1)
Independent	PCC
7	0
Head coach: Lou Little	Head coach: Tiny Thornhill
	1	2	3	4	Total
Columbia	0	7	0	0	7
Stanford	0	0	0	0	0
- Date: January 1, 1934
- Season: 1933
- Stadium: Rose Bowl
- Location: Pasadena, California
- MVP: Cliff Montgomery (Columbia QB)
- Referee: Tom Louttit
- Attendance: 35,000

The 1934 Rose Bowl, played on January 1, 1934, was an American football bowl game. It was the 20th Rose Bowl Game. The Columbia Lions defeated the Stanford Indians (now Cardinal) 7–0. Cliff Montgomery, the Columbia quarterback, was named the Rose Bowl Player Of The Game when the award was created in 1953 and selections were made retroactively. At 35,000, it has the lowest attendance in the Rose Bowl game since the Rose Bowl Stadium was built in 1922. This was one of the few rainy New Year's Day celebrations in Pasadena, California. Rain three days before had turned the Rose Bowl stadium into a small lake.

== Teams ==
For New Year's Day, 1934, the Lions traveled to Pasadena, California to play the heavily favored Stanford Indians. Stanford had only been scored on four times the entire season, but the Light Blue had performed well, going 7–1 for the season.

=== Columbia University Lions ===
Columbia entered the bowl with a 7–1 record, having lost only one game, to Princeton, who finished their season undefeated.

=== Stanford University Indians ===
In the previous season, the "Thundering Herd" of the 1932 USC Trojans, coached by Howard Jones, defeated Stanford 13–0 on the way to a second consecutive national championship and victory in the 1933 Rose Bowl. Freshman players at Stanford (members of the class of 1936) vowed never to lose to the Trojans, and became known as the "Vow Boys". During the 1934 season, USC (6–0–1) hosted Stanford (5–1–1) on November 11 in Los Angeles. The Trojans suffered their first defeat in 27 games, losing 7–13, as the Stanford players kept their vow in a game that ultimately decided the Pacific Coast Conference championship.

== Game conditions and summary ==
For the three days before the game, torrential rains soaked the field, with 5.8 inches soaking Pasadena by New Year's Eve (compared to 2.14 inches for the entire season the year before). “When we arrived the day before the game after traveling from New York by a train, the Rose Bowl looked like a lake,” Montgomery, the team captain, recalled in a 1981 article in The New York Times. The Pasadena fire department pumped out the stadium.

Game day itself was also uncharacteristically rainy for Southern California, and the muddy field rendered the contest scoreless going into the second quarter. With the ball on the Stanford 17-yard line, Columbia quarterback Cliff Montgomery executed a trick play ("KF-79") where he spun and slipped the ball to Al Barabas, then faked a hand-off to Ed Brominski, who ran in the opposite direction. While the Indians went for Montgomery and Brominski, Barabas successfully ran around the defense to score for the Lions. Despite Stanford's Bobby Grayson rushing for 152 yards on 28 carries, and solid performances by end Jim "Monk" Moscrip, lineman Bob Reynolds and others, Barabas' score stood as the only one of the game, handing Columbia one of the biggest upsets in Rose Bowl history. The win also cemented Lou Little's reputation as the Lions' greatest coach to that time.

== Aftermath ==
Winning the 1934 Rose Bowl has, to date, been the greatest accomplishment in Columbia football history. The Columbia Lions had a notable losing streak from 1983 through 1988, losing 44 games in a row during these years, the second-longest losing streak in major college football history. Cliff Montgomery died on April 21, 2005.

The "Vow Boys", the Stanford class of 1936, never did lose to USC, defeating them again 16–0 in 1934, and 3–0 in 1935. The 1933 Michigan Wolverines football team, who tied for first in the Big Ten Conference with Minnesota on a 0–0 tie between the two teams, was voted the 1933 national champion. USC, who had won the previous two years, and who finished the season 10–1–1, was denied a third consecutive national championship.

As of 2025, this remains the last Rose Bowl, and the last bowl overall that had an Ivy League school participant. The Ivy League would ban its members from bowl participation in 1946.
