= List of Oregon Ducks athletic directors =

The University of Oregon Athletic Department has existed in its current hierarchical state with a director of athletics at the top of the department and assistant and associate directors serving as subordinates since 1947. In that time there have been twelve directors of athletics. Three former head football coaches, Len Casanova, Rich Brooks and Mike Bellotti have gone on to serve as director of athletics at some point after their coaching careers. The current director of athletics is Rob Mullens, he has held his post since July 15, 2010.

== Athletic directors ==
No.	Name	Years of service	Alma mater	Current position	Notable accomplishments
1	Leo Harris†	1947–1967	Stanford University ('27)	Deceased	National Champions in Men's Outdoor Track and Field (1962, 1964, 1965); Construction of Autzen Stadium
2	Len Casanova‡	1967–1970	Santa Clara University ('27)	Deceased	National Champions in Men's Outdoor Track and Field (1970)
3	Norv Ritchey	1970–1975	University of Oregon ('53)	Deceased	National Champions in Men's Cross Country (1971, 1973, 1974)
i	Pete Wingert	1975–1976	University of California, Los Angeles ('52)	Retired	
4	John Caine	1976–1981	University of California, Los Angeles ('50)	Deceased	National Champions in Men's Cross Country (1977)
5	Rick Bay	1981–1984	University of Michigan ('65)	Retired	National Champions in Women's Cross Country (1983)
6	Bill Byrne†	1984–1992	Idaho State University ('67)	Retired	National Champions in Men's Outdoor Track and Field (1984); National Champions in Women's Cross Country (1987); Construction of Casanova Center, renovations of Autzen Stadium & Hayward Field
7	Rich Brooks‡	1992–1994	Oregon State University ('63)	Retired	
i	Dan Williams	1994–1995	University of Oregon ('62)	Retired	
8	Bill Moos	1995–2007	Washington State University ('73)	Retired	
9	Pat Kilkenny	2007–2009	None	CEO/founder K2 Insurance Services LLC	National Champions in Men's Cross Country (2007, 2008); Reestablishment of Baseball as a varsity sport Construction of Matthew Knight Arena and PK Park
10	Mike Bellotti‡	2009–2010	University of California, Davis ('72)	ESPN analyst	National Champions in Men's Indoor Track and Field (2009)
11	Rob Mullens	2010–present	West Virginia University ('92)	Incumbent	National Champions in Women's Outdoor Track and Field (2015); National Champions in Women's Indoor Track and Field (2010, 2011, 2012, 2013, 2014); National Champions in Women's Cross Country (2014); National Champions in Men's Outdoor Track and Field (2014, 2015); National Champions in Men's Indoor Track and Field (2014, 2015); Construction of Jaqua Center, Hatfield-Dowlin Complex & Jane Sanders Stadium

Inducted into College Football Hall of Fame (†Administrator ‡Coach #Player)
Inducted into University of Oregon Athletics Hall of Fame (†Administrator ‡Coach #Player)
