= Norv Ritchey =

American academic administrator (1931–2022)

Biographical details
- Born: December 30, 1931; Yoncalla, Oregon, U.S.
- Died: November 2, 2022 (aged 90)

Playing career
- 1951–1953: Oregon
- 1953: Shawnee Hawks

Coaching career (HC unless noted)

Baseball
- 1956–1962: Oregon (freshmen)

Administrative career (AD unless noted)
- 1956–1969: Oregon (admin. asst.)
- 1969–1970: Oregon (asso. AD)
- 1970–1975: Oregon
- 1975–1992: Oregon (asst. dean)

Norval James Ritchey (December 30, 1931 – November 2, 2022) was an American academic administrator who worked at the University of Oregon from 1956 to 1992. From 1970 to 1975, he was Oregon's athletic director.

== Early life ==
Ritchey was born on December 30, 1931 in Yoncalla, Oregon. He played baseball at Yoncalla High School and the University of Oregon. He graduated from Oregon in 1953 and received an Air Force Reserve Officer Training Corps commission. He played 40 games for the Shawnee Hawks, a minor league affiliate of the Brooklyn Dodgers, and batted .321 in 134 at bats. His season was cut short when he was called for active duty with the United States Air Force. He served as personnel services officer and director of athletics at Nagoya Air Base. He was released in 1955.

== Oregon ==
Ritchey returned to the University of Oregon in 1956 as freshman baseball coach. Later that year, he was appointed administrative assistant to athletic director Leo Harris. He stopped coaching in 1962 due to his increased administrative duties. In 1969, he was promoted to associate athletic director. He became acting athletic director when Len Casanova went on sabbatical in 1970. On June 4, 1970, it was announced that Ritchey would succeed Casanova upon his retirement on June 30. He was chosen over external candidates Bump Elliott, Hank Anderson, and Ken Karr.

During the 1970 baseball season, longtime Oregon baseball coach Don Kirsch stepped down due to Parkinson's disease. Ritchey appointed associate coach Jack Roche to succeed Kirsch for the remainder of the season, then hired a former Ducks teammate, Mel Krause, as a permanent replacement.

Following a 5–6 1971 football season, Ritchey asked head coach Jerry Frei to fire some of his assistants in an apparent attempt to appease donors. Frei refused and resigned. Assistant coach Dick Enright was promoted two weeks later. The Ducks went 4–7 in 1971 and 2–9 in 1972. Enright was fired by Ritchey in January 1974. He was succeeded by Don Read, who went 9–24 in three seasons as head coach.

In 1971, Ritchey hired Dick Harter away from Penn in an effort to turn the men's basketball team into a premier program. In seven seasons under Harter, the Ducks went 112–82, but did not appear in the NCAA Division I men's basketball tournament. Despite the success, Ritchey and Harter did not have a good working relationship. Dick Enright described Harter as driving Ritchey crazy and with his constant demands.

Ritchey also dealt with increased financial pressure caused by Title IX requirements, rising costs, and inflation. Consequently, the university had to cut back on some of its travel spending and scholarship funding.

In May 1975, the athletic department underwent a restructuring that saw associate athletic director Mel Krause placed in charge of personnel and Pete Wingert hired to direct its finances. As a result, Ritchey was responsible for fundraising and promotion, but little else.

Ritchey submitted his resignation on September 8, 1975, but wanted to remain with the university in another position. On October 2, he was reassigned to the position of assistant dean in the department of health, physical education, and recreation and Wingert was named acting athletic director. In 1986, Ritchey was inducted into the National Association of Collegiate Directors of Athletics Hall of Fame. He retired in 1992.

== Personal life ==
On May 14, 1955, Ritchey married Mary LaDon Wells in Roseburg, Oregon. They had three children and resided in Springfield, Oregon. One of their sons, Mike Ritchey, was a two-time all Pac-10 Conference selection for the Oregon Ducks baseball team. Mary Ritchey died 2012. In 2014, he married Barbara J. Malos.

A licensed pilot, Ritchey served as an officer in the United States Air Force Reserve and was chairman of the Eugene Airport Commission. On October 24, 1981, Ritchey was presented with the Meritorious Service Medal by Superintendent of the United States Air Force Academy Robert E. Kelley during the halftime ceremonies of the Oregon–Air Force football game.

Ritchey died on November 2, 2022.
