= 1933 Cal Poly Mustangs football team =

American college football season

1933 Cal Poly Mustangs football
- Conference: Independent
- Record: 7–0
- Head coach: Howie O'Daniels (1st season)

1933 Western college football independents records
	Conf.			Overall
Team	W	L	T	W		L		T
Cal Poly		–		7	–	0	–	0
Loyola (CA)		–		7	–	2	–	1
Santa Clara		–		6	–	2	–	1
Saint Mary's		–		6	–	3	–	1
Hawaii		–		4	–	3	–	0
Columbia (OR)		–		4	–	3	–	1
Humboldt State		–		1	–	1	–	0
Gonzaga		–		2	–	6	–	1
San Francisco State		–		2	–	6	–	0
San Francisco		–		1	–	6	–	1

The 1933 Cal Poly Mustangs football team represented California Polytechnic School—now known as California Polytechnic State University, San Luis Obispo—as an independent during the 1933 college football season. Led by first-year head coach Howie O'Daniels, Cal Poly compiled a record of 7–0. The team outscored its opponents 73 to 0 the season. The Mustangs played home games in San Luis Obispo, California.

Cal Poly was a two-year school until 1941 and competed as an independent from 1929 to 1945.

== Schedule ==
Date	Opponent	Site	Result	Source
September 22	Alumni Stars	San Luis Obispo, CA	W 13–0	
October 6	at Santa Barbara State	Peabody Stadium; Santa Barbara, CA	W 3–0	
October 14	at Fresno State freshmen	Fresno State College Stadium; Fresno, CA	W 6–0	
October 21	at Moran Junior College (Note: Moran Junior College was founded in 1914 in Bainbridge Island, Washington. A satellite campus was opened in 1928 in Atascadero, California. Records show that the California site fielded football teams from 1929 to 1935. The Washington campus closed in 1935 and the California campus closed shortly thereafter.)	Atascadero, CA	W 20–0	
October 28	Salinas	Salinas, CA	W 1–0 (forfeit win)	
November 4	Porterville	San Luis Obispo, CA	W 24–0	
November 10	at Santa Maria	Santa Maria, CA	W 6–0	
