= 1933 Gonzaga Bulldogs football team =

American college football season

1933 Gonzaga Bulldogs football
- Conference: Independent
- Record: 2–6–1
- Head coach: Mike Pecarovich (3rd season)
- Home stadium: Gonzaga Stadium

1933 Western college football independents records
	Conf.			Overall
Team	W	L	T	W		L		T
Cal Poly		–		7	–	0	–	0
Loyola (CA)		–		7	–	2	–	1
Santa Clara		–		6	–	2	–	1
Saint Mary's		–		6	–	3	–	1
Hawaii		–		4	–	3	–	0
Columbia (OR)		–		4	–	3	–	1
Humboldt State		–		1	–	1	–	0
Gonzaga		–		2	–	6	–	1
San Francisco State		–		2	–	6	–	0
San Francisco		–		1	–	6	–	1

The 1933 Gonzaga Bulldogs football team was an American football team that represented Gonzaga University as an independent during the 1933 college football season. In their third year under head coach Mike Pecarovich, the Bulldogs compiled a 2–6–1 record and were outscored by a total of 96 to 40.

== Schedule ==
Date	Opponent	Site	Result	Attendance	Source
September 23	at Washington	Husky Stadium; Seattle, WA	L 0–13	4,411	
September 30	Oregon	Gonzaga Stadium; Spokane, WA	L 0–14	8,000	
October 7	at Oregon State	Multnomah Stadium; Portland, OR	T 0–0	20,000	
October 22	West Seattle Athletic Club	Gonzaga Stadium; Spokane, WA	W 8–6	3,000	
October 29	at San Francisco	Kezar Stadium; San Francisco, CA	L 0–6		
November 4	Washington State	Gonzaga Stadium; Spokane, WA	L 0–16	10,000	
November 11	Montana	Gonzaga Stadium; Spokane, WA	L 7–13		
November 19	at Columbia (OR)	Vaughn Street Park; Portland, OR	W 13–8		
November 30	Idaho	Gonzaga Stadium; Spokane, WA	L 12–20	8,500	
