= Pete Wingert =

Clark "Pete" Wingert is an American businessman who was acting athletic director at the University of Oregon from 1975 to 1976.

== Biography ==
A graduate of the University of California, Los Angeles, Wingert was a supporter of the UCLA Bruins men's basketball program and raised funds for the construction of Pauley Pavilion. In 1971, Wingert, who was residing in Vida, Oregon and working in real estate investment, became involved with the Oregon Ducks men's basketball team. He assisted head coach Dick Harter with recruiting and travel arrangements to the National Invitation Tournament. He was named Oregon Basketball Man of the Year in 1975 for his work with the program.

In May 1975, with the athletic department over budget and expected to face budget cut the following year, Wingert was hired as a fiscal consultant. On October 2, athletic director Norv Ritchey was reassigned and Wingert was named acting AD. He did not want the job full-time, as he did not enjoy being in the public eye and wanted to leave the university when his one-year contract expired on June 30, 1976. John Caine was hired on February 26, 1976. In 1977, Caine chose Wingert to chair a committee that studied the feasibility of a new basketball arena. Plans for the new arena were put on hold in 1979 and the Ducks would not have a new home until the Matthew Knight Arena opened in 2011.

During the 1980s, Wingert was president of FLIR Systems Inc., a manufacturer of thermal imaging cameras and sensors.
