= 1933 Humboldt State Lumberjacks football team =

American college football season

1933 Humboldt State Lumberjacks football
- Conference: Independent
- Record: 1–1
- Head coach: Fred Telonicher (7th season)
- Home stadium: Albee Stadium

1933 Western college football independents records
	Conf.			Overall
Team	W	L	T	W		L		T
Cal Poly		–		7	–	0	–	0
Loyola (CA)		–		7	–	2	–	1
Santa Clara		–		6	–	2	–	1
Saint Mary's		–		6	–	3	–	1
Hawaii		–		4	–	3	–	0
Columbia (OR)		–		4	–	3	–	1
Humboldt State		–		1	–	1	–	0
Gonzaga		–		2	–	6	–	1
San Francisco State		–		2	–	6	–	0
San Francisco		–		1	–	6	–	1

The 1933 Humboldt State Lumberjacks football team represented Humboldt State Normal College—now known as California State Polytechnic University, Humboldt—as an independent during the 1933 college football season. Led by seventh-year head coach Fred Telonicher, the Lumberjacks compiled a record of 1–1 and were outscored their by opponents 7 to 6 for the season. The team played home games at Albee Stadium in Eureka, California.

== Schedule ==
Date	Opponent	Site	Result	Source
	Humboldt State alumni	Albee Stadium; Eureka, CA	W 6–0	
September 30	San Francisco State	Albee Stadium; Eureka, CA	L 0–7	
