= 1933 Pacific Tigers football team =

American college football season

1933 Pacific Tigers football
- Conference: Far Western Conference
- Record: 5–5 (3–2 FWC)
- Head coach: Amos Alonzo Stagg (1st season)
- Home stadium: Baxter Stadium

1933 Far Western Conference football standings
	Conf.					Overall
Team	W		L		T	W		L		T
Nevada $	3	–	0	–	0	4	–	4	–	0
San Jose State	3	–	1	–	0	4	–	4	–	0
Pacific (CA)	3	–	2	–	0	5	–	5	–	0
Fresno State	1	–	2	–	0	5	–	4	–	0
Chico State	1	–	3	–	0	2	–	6	–	0
Cal Aggies	1	–	4	–	0	2	–	5	–	0
$ – Conference champion

The 1933 Pacific Tigers football team represented the College of the Pacific—now known as the University of the Pacific—in Stockton, California as a member of the Far Western Conference (FWC) during the 1933 college football season. Led by first-year head coach Amos Alonzo Stagg, Pacific compiled an overall record of 5–5 with a mark of 3–2 in conference play, placing third in the FWC. The team outscored its opponents 71 to 59 for the season. The Tigers played home games at Baxter Stadium in Stockton.

== Schedule ==
Date	Opponent	Site	Result	Attendance	Source
September 22	at Western Oregon*	Multnomah Stadium; Portland, OR	L 0–12		
September 29	California JV*	Baxter Stadium; Stockton, CA	W 3–0		
October 6	at Modesto*	Modesto, CA	W 16–0		
October 16	at San Jose State	Spartan Stadium; San Jose, CA (rivalry)	L 6–12		
October 21	at Nevada	Mackay Stadium (Note: This stadium is the predecessor to the current Mackay Stadium, which was opened for the 1966 season.); Reno, NV	L 0–7		
October 27	Chico State	Baxter Stadium; Stockton, CA	W 14–0		
November 4	Cal Aggies^{†}	Baxter Stadium; Stockton, CA	W 13–7		
November 11	Saint Mary's*	Baxter Stadium; Stockton, CA	L 0–7	12,000	
November 24	at Loyola (CA)*	Wrigley Field; Los Angeles, CA	L 7–14	15,000	
November 30	at Fresno State	Fresno State College Stadium; Fresno, CA	W 12–0	8,000	
*Non-conference game; ^{†}Homecoming
