= 1933 San Francisco Dons football team =

American college football season

1933 San Francisco Dons football
- Conference: Independent
- Record: 1–5–1
- Head coach: Spud Lewis (2nd season)
- Home stadium: Kezar Stadium

1933 Western college football independents records
	Conf.			Overall
Team	W	L	T	W		L		T
Cal Poly		–		7	–	0	–	0
Loyola (CA)		–		7	–	2	–	1
Santa Clara		–		6	–	2	–	1
Saint Mary's		–		6	–	3	–	1
Hawaii		–		4	–	3	–	0
Columbia (OR)		–		4	–	3	–	1
Humboldt State		–		1	–	1	–	0
Gonzaga		–		2	–	6	–	1
San Francisco State		–		2	–	6	–	0
San Francisco		–		1	–	6	–	1

The 1933 San Francisco Dons football team was an American football team that represented the University of San Francisco as an independent during the 1933 college football season. In their second season under head coach Spud Lewis, the Dons compiled a 1–6–1 record and were outscored by a combined total of 74 to 42.

Cover of the program for the October 14 game against Oregon State College.

== Schedule ==
Date	Opponent	Site	Result	Attendance	Source
September 22	Nevada	Seals Stadium; San Francisco	L 7–12		
October 1	Saint Mary's	Kezar Stadium; San Francisco	L 0–7		
October 14	Oregon State	Kezar Stadium; San Francisco	L 7–12	3,000	
October 21	Stanford	Kezar Stadium; San Francisco	L 13–20		
October 29	Gonzaga	Kezar Stadium; San Francisco	W 6–0		
November 12	Loyola (CA)	Kezar Stadium; San Francisco	T 0–0	5,000	
November 26	Olympic Club	Kezar Stadium; San Francisco	L 9–16		
December 3	Santa Clara	Kezar Stadium; San Francisco	L 0–6	5,000	
