= 1933 Hawaii Rainbows football team =

American college football season

1933 Hawaii Rainbows football
- Conference: Independent
- Record: 4–3
- Head coach: Otto Klum (13th season)
- Home stadium: Honolulu Stadium

1933 Western college football independents records
	Conf.			Overall
Team	W	L	T	W		L		T
Cal Poly		–		7	–	0	–	0
Loyola (CA)		–		7	–	2	–	1
Santa Clara		–		6	–	2	–	1
Saint Mary's		–		6	–	3	–	1
Hawaii		–		4	–	3	–	0
Columbia (OR)		–		4	–	3	–	1
Humboldt State		–		1	–	1	–	0
Gonzaga		–		2	–	6	–	1
San Francisco State		–		2	–	6	–	0
San Francisco		–		1	–	6	–	1

The 1933 Hawaii Rainbows football team represented the University of Hawaiʻi (now known as the University of Hawaiʻi at Mānoa) as an independent during the 1933 college football season. Led by 13th-year head coach Otto Klum, the Rainbows compiled an overall record of 4–3.

== Schedule ==
Date	Opponent	Site	Result	Attendance	Source
September 27	McKinley High School alumni	Honolulu Stadium; Honolulu, Territory of Hawaii	W 13–7	7,000	
October 11	Saint Louis School alumni	Honolulu Stadium; Honolulu, Territory of Hawaii	L 0–14	6,000	
October 25	Kamehameha alumni	Honolulu Stadium; Honolulu, Territory of Hawaii	L 12–19	4,000	
November 11	at Denver	DU Stadium; Denver, CO	W 7–6		
November 23	Pearl Harbor Navy	Honolulu Stadium; Honolulu, Territory of Hawaii	W 21–7		
December 2	Honolulu Town Team	Honolulu Stadium; Honolulu, Territory of Hawaii	W 13–7	2,500	
January 1, 1934	Santa Clara	Honolulu Stadium; Honolulu, Territory of Hawaii	L 7–26	12,755	
