= 1933 Saint Mary's Gaels football team =

American college football season

1933 Saint Mary's Gaels football
- Conference: Independent
- Record: 6–3–1
- Head coach: Slip Madigan (13th season)
- Home stadium: Kezar Stadium

1933 Western college football independents records
	Conf.			Overall
Team	W	L	T	W		L		T
Cal Poly		–		7	–	0	–	0
Loyola (CA)		–		7	–	2	–	1
Santa Clara		–		6	–	2	–	1
Saint Mary's		–		6	–	3	–	1
Hawaii		–		4	–	3	–	0
Columbia (OR)		–		4	–	3	–	1
Humboldt State		–		1	–	1	–	0
Gonzaga		–		2	–	6	–	1
San Francisco State		–		2	–	6	–	0
San Francisco		–		1	–	6	–	1

The 1933 Saint Mary's Gaels football team was an American football team that represented Saint Mary's College of California during the 1933 college football season. In their 13th season under head coach Slip Madigan, the Gaels compiled a 6–3–1 record and outscored their opponents by a combined total of 161 to 73. The Gaels' victories included a 13–6 besting of Fordham, a 22–14 victory over UCLA, and an 18–6 victory over SMU. They lost to California (13–14), USC (7–14), and Oregon (7–13).

Four Gaels received honors on the 1933 All-Pacific Coast football team: halfback George Wilson (AP-1, UP-1); end Fred Canrinus (AP-2, UP-1); tackle Carl Jorgensen (AP-2, UP-1); and guard Ed Gilbert (AP-2).

== Schedule ==
Date	Opponent	Site	Result	Attendance	Source
October 1	San Francisco	Kezar Stadium; San Francisco, CA	W 7–0	30,000	
October 7	at California	California Memorial Stadium; Berkeley, CA	L 13–14	65,000	
October 14	at USC	Los Angeles Memorial Coliseum; Los Angeles, CA	L 7–14	80,000	
October 27	Nevada	Kezar Stadium; San Francisco, CA	W 61–0	> 35,000	
November 4	at Fordham	Polo Grounds; New York, NY	W 13–6	62,000	
November 11	at Pacific (CA)	Baxter Stadium; Stockton, CA	W 7–0	12,000	
November 19	vs. Santa Clara	Kezar Stadium; San Francisco, CA	T 6–6	59,000	
November 25	at UCLA	Los Angeles Memorial Coliseum; Los Angeles, CA	W 22–14	35,000	
November 30	Oregon	Kezar Stadium; San Francisco, CA (Governors' Trophy Game)	L 7–13	30,000	
December 9	SMU	Kezar Stadium; San Francisco, CA	W 18–6	25,000	
