= Oregon Ducks =

Intercollegiate sports teams of the University of Oregon

- University: University of Oregon
- Nickname: Ducks
- NCAA: Division I (FBS)
- Conference: Big Ten (primary); Mountain Pacific Sports Federation (indoor track & field); NCATA (acrobatics and tumbling)
- Athletic director: Rob Mullens
- Location: Eugene, Oregon
- Varsity teams: 18
- Football stadium: Autzen Stadium
- Basketball arena: Matthew Knight Arena
- Baseball stadium: PK Park
- Softball stadium: Jane Sanders Stadium
- Soccer stadium: Papé Field
- Golf course: Emerald Valley Golf Club
- Tennis venue: Student Tennis Center
- Outdoor track and field venue: Hayward Field
- Other venues: McArthur Court
- Colors: Green and yellow
- Mascot: The Oregon Duck
- Fight song: Mighty Oregon
- Website: goducks.com

Big Ten logo in Oregon colors

The Oregon Ducks are the intercollegiate athletic teams that represent the University of Oregon, located in Eugene. The Ducks compete at the National Collegiate Athletic Association (NCAA) Division I level as a member of the Big Ten Conference. With eighteen varsity teams, Oregon is best known for its American football team and track and field program, which has helped Eugene gain a reputation as "Track Town, USA". Oregon's main rivalries are with the Oregon State Beavers (the Civil War) and the Washington Huskies.

== Nicknames and mascot history ==
Oregon teams were originally known as Webfoots, possibly as early as the 1890s. The Webfoots name originally applied to a group of fishermen from the coast of Massachusetts who had been heroes during the American Revolutionary War; their descendants had settled in Oregon's Willamette Valley in the 19th century and the name stayed with them. A naming contest in 1926 won by Oregonian sports editor L. H. Gregory made the Webfoots name official, and a subsequent student vote in 1932 affirmed the nickname, chosen over other suggested nicknames such as Pioneers, Trappers, Lumberjacks, Wolves, and Yellow Jackets.

Ducks, with their webbed feet, began to be associated with the team in the 1920s, and live duck mascots were adopted to represent the team. Journalists, especially headline writers, also adopted the shorter Duck nickname, but it was not until the 1940s that the image of Donald Duck, permitted via a handshake deal between Walt Disney and Oregon athletic director Leo Harris, cemented the image of the Duck as the school's mascot. Both nicknames were still in use well into the 1970s.

In 1978, a student cartoonist came up with a new duck image, but students rejected the alternative by a 2-to-1 margin. Although Donald was not on that ballot, the University Archivist declared that the election made Ducks the school's official mascot, replacing Webfoots. In 1993, then-University President Myles Brand asked the University’s Board of Directors to change the teams’ names to Mighty Ducks Too, a reference to the then-upcoming sequel to The Mighty Ducks; when Disney learned of this change, they pivoted the sequel's title from The Mighty Ducks 2 to D2: The Mighty Ducks, leading to Brand’s departure from the University the following year.

== Varsity programs ==
| Men's sports | Women's sports |
|---|---|
| Baseball | Acrobatics & tumbling |
| Basketball | Basketball |
| Cross country | Beach volleyball |
| Football | Cross country |
| Golf | Golf |
| Tennis | Lacrosse |
| Track and field^{†} | Soccer |
| | Softball |
| | Tennis |
| | Track and field^{†} |
| | Volleyball |
† – Track and field includes both indoor and outdoor.

The University of Oregon sponsors teams in eight men's and twelve women's NCAA sanctioned sports. The Ducks primarily compete in the Big Ten Conference with exception to Acrobatics & tumbling (National Collegiate Acrobatics & Tumbling Association) and women's beach Volleyball (Mountain Pacific Sports Federation).

=== Baseball ===
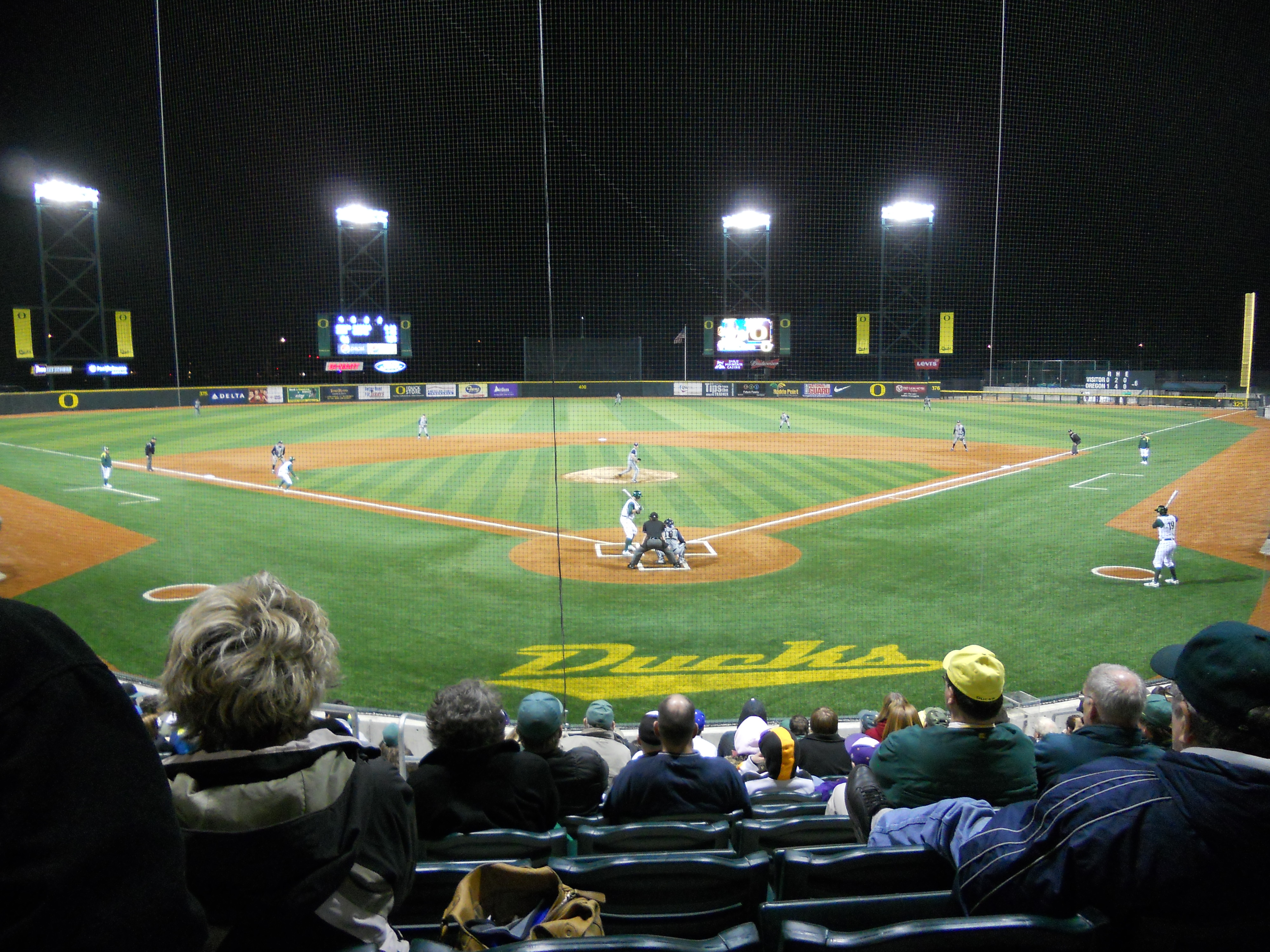
Oregon v BYU game in 2011

The Ducks baseball team first played in 1877, the year following the establishment of the university. In 1981, baseball was dropped due to budgetary concerns. Baseball would be reinstated 26 years later by interim athletic director Patrick Kilkenny and played its first game in 2009.

George Horton, who led the Cal State Fullerton baseball team to an NCAA national championship, was hired in 2007 to lead the reinstated Oregon Ducks baseball program. In his second year, Horton guided the team in to a 40-24 record and a berth in the NCAA regionals.

=== Basketball ===
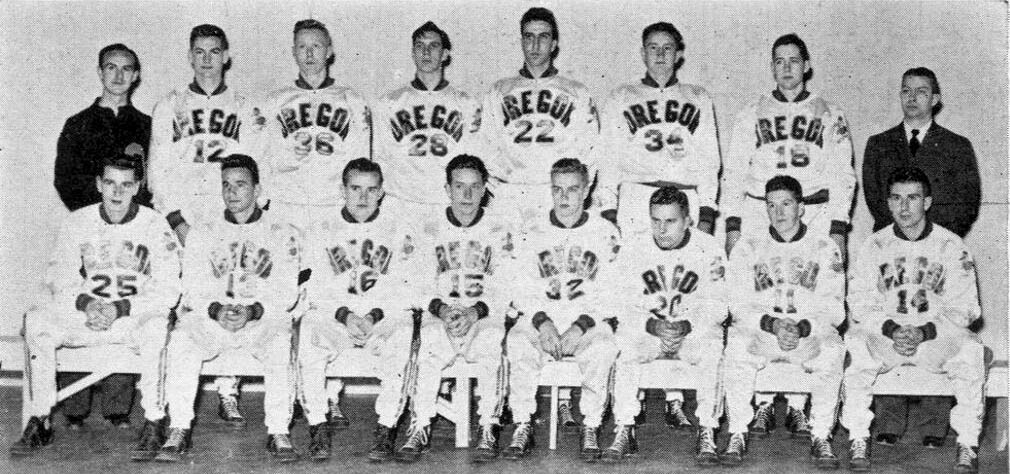
Oregon men's basketball team of 1939

The Ducks men's basketball team played its first season in 1902-1903 under head coach Charles Burden. It was not until 1927 that the Ducks played their first game at McArthur Court, defeating Willamette University 38-10. Head coach Howard Hobson was hired in 1936 and took the basketball team nicknamed "The Tall Firs" to win the first NCAA Men's Basketball Championship in 1939. The Tall Firs achieved a 29-5 record, capped by a 46-33 victory over Ohio State University in the championship game.

The Ducks men's team would add only one more shared Pacific Coast Conference title to their two until winning the Pacific-10 Conference title in the 2001-2002 season under head coach Ernie Kent. The Ducks would also make an Elite Eight appearance in the NCAA Tournament that season along with the 2006-2007 season. In 2010-2011, the Ducks moved into the new Matthew Knight Arena and welcomed new coach Dana Altman. Since, Altman has won three Pac-12 Conference Coach of the Year honors (2013, 2015, 2016) and led Oregon to the 2013 Pac-12 Conference men's basketball tournament championship. In addition, Altman has taken Oregon to four straight NCAA men's basketball tournament for the first time in program history (2013, 2014, 2015, 2016), including a trip to the Sweet 16 in 2013 and the Elite 8 in 2016. The Ducks won the 2015-2016 Pac-12 Conference Tournament. This led to the Ducks being the top seed in the West Regional of the 2015-2016 NCAA tournament, its first ever top seeding in the NCAA tournament. The Ducks defeated Holy Cross and Saint Joseph's in the first two rounds of the NCAA tournament to advance to the Sweet 16 in Anaheim, where they defeated the number four seed and defending national champion Duke Blue Devils, 82-68, to advance to the Elite 8.

On the women's side, three eventual first-round WNBA draft picks—Sabrina Ionescu (30 points), Satou Sabally (25 points), and Ruthy Hebard—led the No. 1 ranked Ducks to a 93–86 victory over Team USA in November 2019. Their opponents had won the last six Olympic gold medals, the 2018 World Cup, and already qualified for the 2020 Tokyo Olympics, and included WNBA stars Diana Taurasi, Sue Bird, Nneka Ogwumike, and Sylvia Fowles. The exhibition game was Team USA's first loss to a college team in 20 years. Ionescu, the top pick in the 2020 draft, is also the only NCAA basketball player of either sex to record 2,000 points, 1,000 rebounds, and 1,000 assists in a career, as well as the recipient of multiple national player of the year awards in both 2019 and 2020, sweeping all of the major awards in the latter year.

=== Football ===
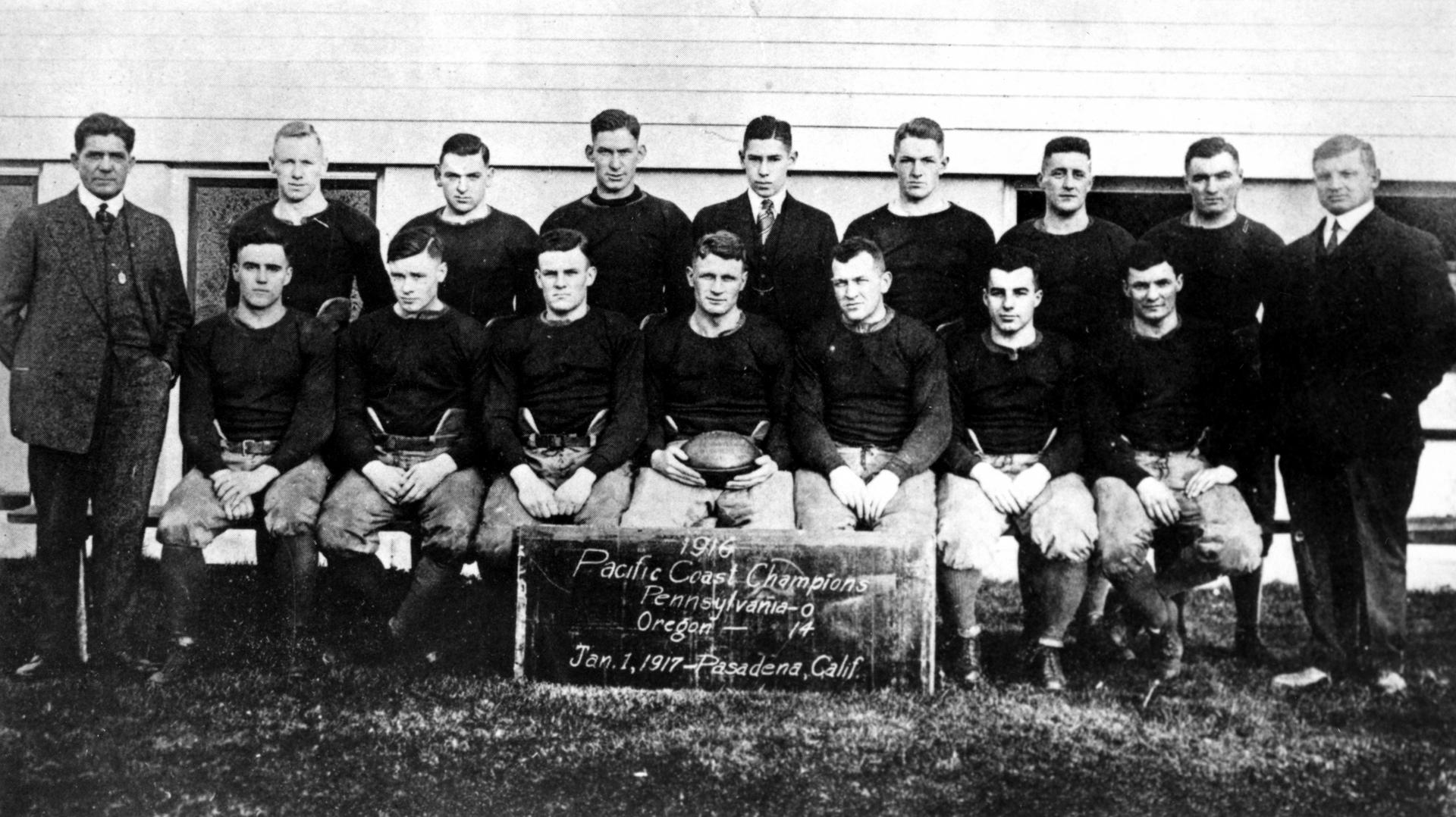
University of Oregon 1916 football team

The football program began in 1893 and played its first game on February 22, 1894, defeating Albany College 46-0. The football team moved to its new home, Hayward Field in 1919 where it shared the facility with the track and field team until Autzen Stadium was completed in 1967.

Winning its first Rose Bowl in 1917 against the University of Pennsylvania under head coach Hugo Bezdek, the Ducks have returned to the Rose Bowl seven additional times in 1920, 1957, 1995, 2010, 2012, 2015, and 2020. While in the Pacific Coast Conference, the Ducks won five conference co-championships in 1919, 1933, 1948, and 1957. The Pacific Coast Conference was disbanded in 1958, and the Ducks played as an independent until they joined the PCC's effective successor, the Pacific-8 Conference (then officially the Athletic Association of Western Universities), which later became the Pacific-10 Conference and eventually the Pac-12 Conference, in 2011. In the Pac-8/10/12, they have won seven conference championships (1994, 2001, 2009, 2010, 2011, 2014, 2019) and shared one championship (2000). The Ducks were 3–2 during the BCS era, winning the 2002 Fiesta Bowl, the 2012 Rose Bowl, and the 2013 Fiesta Bowl and losing the 2010 Rose Bowl and the 2011 BCS National Championship Game.

In 2014, Oregon won a school record 13 games and saw junior quarterback Marcus Mariota win the school's first Heisman Trophy. That same year, the Ducks made the first ever College Football Playoff and beat the defending champion Florida State Seminoles 59–20 in the 2015 Rose Bowl semi-final. The loss to Oregon ended the Seminoles 29 game win streak and moved the Ducks into the final. They made the first ever CFP National Championship Game where they lost 42–20 to Ohio State.

=== Softball ===
Oregon Softball plays home games at the new Jane Sanders Stadium. Oregon began WCWS success under former Coach Mike White who had taken Oregon to the Women's College World Series (WCWS) four times in 6 years. Oregon has appeared in seven WCWS, in 1976, 1980, 1989, 2012, 2014, 2015 and 2017. In 2014 and 2017, the Ducks reached the national semi-finals.

=== Track and field ===
The Cross Country and Track & Field programs at the University of Oregon helped Eugene, OR earn the nickname “Track Town, USA.” Since its very first meet in 1895, the program has set the tone for decades of competition. In 1903, Bill Hayward assumed the role of head coach, guiding the program for 44 years and mentoring athletes such as Daniel Kelly and Ralph Hill, both of whom earned Olympic medals. Following Hayward’s retirement in 1947, his protégé Bill Bowerman stepped into the head coaching position in 1949, continuing the program’s traditions.

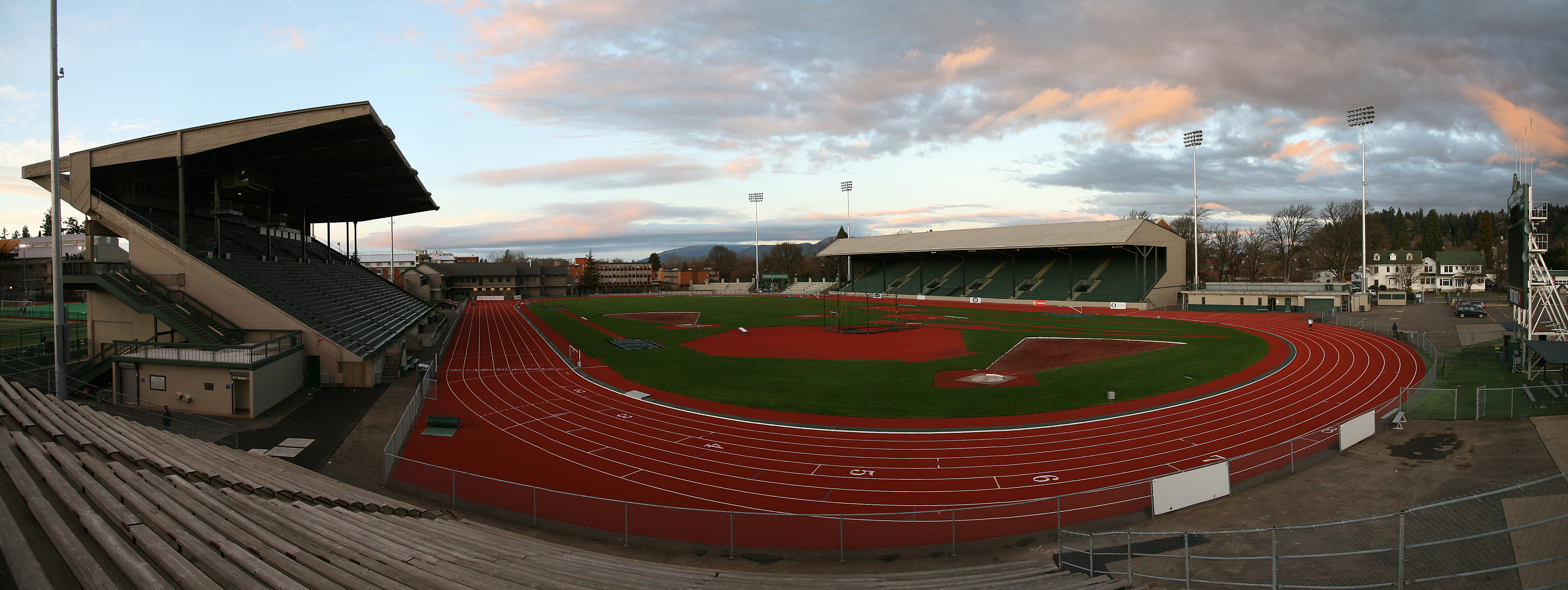
Hayward Field

Bill Bowerman became a legendary coach, winning numerous NCAA team Championships at Oregon and coached many to All-American and Olympian status such as Steve Prefontaine. His talents were not limited to the track, as he also co-founded Nike, pressured the Amateur Athletic Union to improve its services, and brought the Olympic Trials and NCAA Championships to Hayward Field.

Bill Bowerman retired in 1973 and his assistant coach, Bill Dellinger became the head coach who brought four NCAA Cross Country Championships and one NCAA Track & Field Championship.

Steve Prefontaine, who ran at Oregon in the early 1970s, was a legend in his own right, setting 13 American records in seven separate events and only lost three races at Hayward Field during the span of his career. He won seven NCAA championships and today, the Prefontaine Classic is held every year at Hayward Field in his honor.

The program has garnered numerous NCAA national titles across all the disciplines.

=== Volleyball ===
The Oregon Volleyball program play its home games at Matthew Knight Arena. They have appeared in the NCAA Tournament 21 times including the 2012 National Title Game. Oregon defeated #1 Penn State in the National Semi-Finals before losing to eventual champion Texas in the title match.

=== Other varsity sports ===
The Ducks also have varsity teams in women's basketball, golf, tennis, lacrosse, soccer, team stunts and gymnastics.

== Notable non-varsity sports ==
=== Rugby ===
Founded in 1961, the University of Oregon Rugby Football Club plays Division 1 college rugby in the Northwest collegiate rugby conference against local rivals such as Washington and Washington State. Oregon's biggest rivalry, however, is their "civil war" matchup against in-state rival Oregon State University. Oregon plays its home games at Riverfront Field. The Ducks have been led by head coach Pate Tuisue since 2012.

The University of Oregon Women's Club Rugby Team has been coached by Greg Farrell since 1998. They are a part of the Pacific Mountain Rugby Conference. During their league season they will play University of Washington, Washington State University, Oregon State, Boise State University, and Western Washington University. For the past couple years the team's main rival has been Washington State University. Oregon Women's also plays on Riverfront field.

=== Ice hockey (Men's) ===
The Ducks compete as independents in Division I of the American Collegiate Hockey Association. Prior to their move up from Division II in 2022, the team won six PAC-8 Championships in ten appearances.

=== Lacrosse (Men's) ===
The Ducks Club Lacrosse team competes in Division I of the Pacific Northwest Collegiate Lacrosse League of the Men's Collegiate Lacrosse Association. Since joining in 1997, the ducks have won 10 PNCLL Conference Championships and made an MCLA title game appearance in 2007.

== Championships ==
=== NCAA team championships ===
Oregon has won 35 NCAA team national championships.

- Men's (20)
  - Basketball (1): 1939
  - Cross country (6): 1971, 1973, 1974, 1977, 2007, 2008
  - Golf (1): 2016
  - Indoor Track & Field (5): 2009, 2014, 2015, 2016, 2021
  - Outdoor Track & Field (7): 1962, 1964, 1965, 1970, 1984, 2014, 2015
- Women's (15)
  - Cross country (4): 1983, 1987, 2012, 2016
  - Indoor Track & Field (8): 2010, 2011, 2012, 2013, 2014, 2016, 2017, 2025
  - Outdoor Track & Field (3): 1985, 2015, 2017
- see also:
  - Pac-12 Conference NCAA championships
  - List of NCAA schools with the most NCAA Division I championships

Oregon has 1 unclaimed national championship from multiple NCAA-designated major selector for the 2024 season. The Ducks went 13–1 and won the Big Ten championship over Penn State before losing to eventual CFP National Championship winner Ohio State in the Rose Bowl, a team they defeated in the regular season. The school does not claim this title because they did not win the playoff tournament.

Below are four national team titles that are not bestowed by the NCAA:

- Women's
  - Acrobatics and Tumbling (4): 2011, 2012, 2013, 2014
    - Acrobatics & tumbling is now an NCAA-recognized sport as part of its Emerging Sports for Women program. However, it did not become an Emerging Sport until 2020–21, and still does not have an NCAA-organized championship event.
- see also:
  - List of NCAA schools with the most Division I national championships

=== Other national championship game appearances ===
- Football (2): 2010, 2014
- Women's volleyball (1): 2012
- Men's golf (1) : 2017
- Women's golf (1) : 2022

== Athletic facilities ==
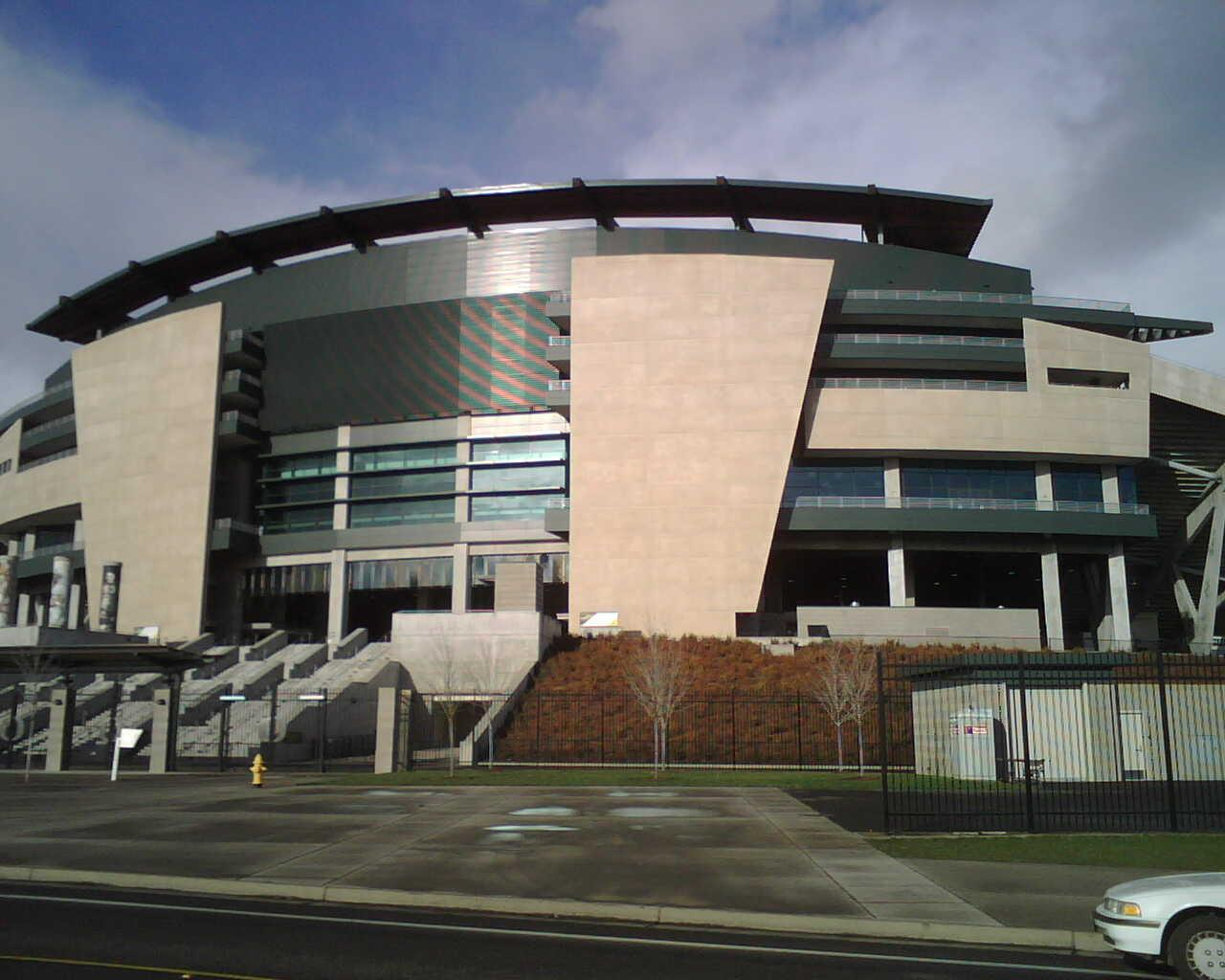
Autzen Stadium

The Oregon Ducks football complex is located across the Willamette River to the north of the main campus. The complex includes Autzen Stadium where the games are played, the Len Casanova Center where the locker rooms and training facilities are located, the indoor practice field called the Moshofsky Center, and the outdoor training field named Kilkenny Field. Much of the cost of the state-of-the-art facilities were paid for by the prominent university boosters Phil Knight, Ed Moshofsky, and Patrick Kilkenny.

Also in the football complex is PK Park, the University of Oregon baseball stadium, completed in 2009 for the reemergence of the baseball program, located in the northeast corner of the parking lot.

The basketball teams along with other court-based sports play at Matthew Knight Arena, dubbed "Matt Court" in a play on McArthur Court's longstanding nickname "Mac Court", the Oregon Ducks' main court through the first part of the 2010–11 season.

Hayward Field was originally constructed for the football team in 1919 and in 1921, a track was installed to accommodate the track team. Today, it is the home of the Oregon Ducks track and field team. This storied venue has been the host of the NCAA Outdoor Track and Field Championships twelve times. The Olympic Trials have been hosted at this venue four times. Hayward field also hosted the World Athletics Championships in 2022 marking the first time the event was ever held in the United States.

Jane Sanders Stadium, the newest Ducks sports venue, located at the south end of campus, opened in March 2016 as the home diamond for the Ducks softball team.

== Rivalries ==
The Oregon Ducks have an in-state rivalry with the Oregon State Beavers in which they play for the Platypus Trophy. The rivalry, dubbed the Civil War, has been scored across ten different sports that the two universities share over the past nine years. The series is currently tied 4-4-1.

The Oregon Ducks and the Washington Huskies have enjoyed a border rivalry (also referred to as the Cascade Clash). The rivalry began to build steam in 1948, when the Ducks and the California Golden Bears tied for the conference win and the Huskies’ vote went to Cal which inked them in for a trip to the Rose Bowl. A few years later, there was a move to remove Oregon, Oregon State, and Washington State from the Pacific Coast Conference (whose history the Pac-10 claims as its own) and the Huskies did not object.

== Relationship with Nike ==
The University of Oregon is commonly referred to as the University of Nike due to Nike co-founder Phil Knight's influence through his donations to the school over the years. Knight ran in the University of Oregon Track & Field program under Nike co-founder Bill Bowerman. Knight graduated from the University of Oregon in 1959 with a bachelor's degree in accounting and went on to earn an M.B.A. at Stanford University. Knight returned to Oregon and with Bowerman, also a University of Oregon alumnus, later founded Blue Ribbon Sports in 1964, which officially became Nike in 1978. In 1970, Bowerman revolutionized the athletic shoe by pouring molten rubber into a waffle iron, creating a prototype rubber sole. University of Oregon distance runner Steve Prefontaine became the first major track athlete to wear Nike shoes and converted many of his peers to the Nike brand.

Nike has maintained a close relationship with UO ever since, manufacturing all university logo clothing and uniforms for athletic teams, including research prototypes for high-tech "smart clothes", such as jerseys with cooling systems. Numerous University of Oregon graduates have also gone on to become executives, designers, and business partners of Nike such as Tinker Hatfield and Dan Wieden.

Phil Knight has personally donated significant amounts to the University for both academic and athletic aspirations, including significant amounts toward the Knight Library, the Knight Law Center, numerous endowed chairs, support for the track & field program, the Autzen Stadium expansion, and a $100 million donation to create the Oregon Athletics Legacy Fund.

Controversy surrounding Nike's labor practices precipitated protests in 2000 led by a group of students calling themselves the Human Rights Alliance. Protests included a 10-day tent city occupation of the lawns in front of Johnson Hall, the main administration building, demanding the university join the Worker Rights Consortium (WRC).

University President Dave Frohnmayer signed a one-year contract with the WRC, causing Phil Knight to withdraw a previous $30 million commitment toward the Autzen Stadium expansion project and no further donations toward the University. Nike, since 1998, had actively improved worker conditions abroad and strongly endorsed the Fair Labor Association, an association with similar aspirations of the WRC but with origins and board members from the apparel industry, including Nike. In a public statement, Phil Knight criticized the WRC for having unrealistic provisions and called it misguided while praising the FLA for being balanced in its approach. The students disagreed, saying the FLA has conflicting interests, but President Dave Frohnmayer along with several others agreed with Knight in that the WRC provides unbalanced representation.

Citing a legal opinion from the University Counsel, President Frohnmayer in October 2000, released a statement saying that the University could not pay its membership dues for the WRC since the WRC was neither an incorporated entity nor had tax-exempt status and to do so was a violation of state law. The Oregon University System on February 16, 2001, enacted a mandate that all institutions within the OUS choose business partners from a politically neutral standpoint, barring all universities in Oregon from membership in the WRC and the FLA. Following the dissolved relationship between the university and the WRC, Phil Knight reinstated the donation and increased the amount to over $50 million. Since then, activity on the subject died down and Frohnmayer believed that the leaders of the protest lost their foothold since they did not represent the majority of students on campus.

The relationship between the University of Oregon and Nike was the topic of the book, "University of Nike" by Joshua Hunt. In the book, Hunt describes the influence that Nike held over university administrators as well as the tactics Nike employed to the benefit of their own interests via their philanthropy. The book also points to this relationship as a bellwether as other U.S. states reduce higher education funding, resulting in universities accepting a greater percentage of their funding from corporate sources with their corresponding interests.

== See also ==
- Oregon Sports Hall of Fame
- List of Oregon Ducks Athletic Directors
