= 1933 Santa Clara Broncos football team =

American college football season

1933 Santa Clara Broncos football
- Conference: Independent
- Record: 6–2–1
- Head coach: Clipper Smith (5th season)
- Home stadium: Kezar Stadium

1933 Western college football independents records
	Conf.			Overall
Team	W	L	T	W		L		T
Cal Poly		–		7	–	0	–	0
Loyola (CA)		–		7	–	2	–	1
Santa Clara		–		6	–	2	–	1
Saint Mary's		–		6	–	3	–	1
Hawaii		–		4	–	3	–	0
Columbia (OR)		–		4	–	3	–	1
Humboldt State		–		1	–	1	–	0
Gonzaga		–		2	–	6	–	1
San Francisco State		–		2	–	6	–	0
San Francisco		–		1	–	6	–	1

The 1933 Santa Clara Broncos football team was an American football team that represented Santa Clara University as an independent during the 1933 college football season. In their fifth season under head coach Clipper Smith, the Broncos compiled a 6–2–1 record and outscored opponents by a total of 101 to 40.

Key players included quarterback Joe Morey, halfbacks Bill Denser, Vin O'Connell, and Chuck Fuller, and fullback "Diamond Joe" Paglia.

== Schedule ==
Date	Opponent	Site	Result	Attendance	Source
September 23	at California	California Memorial Stadium; Berkeley, CA	W 7–0	60,000	
October 7	at Stanford	Stanford Stadium; Stanford, CA	L 0–7	35,000	
October 14	at San Diego Marines	San Diego, CA	L 7–14		
October 22	Olympic Club	Kezar Stadium; San Francisco, CA	W 19–0	15,000	
November 4	Rice	Kezar Stadium; San Francisco, CA	W 13–0	15,000	
November 19	vs. Saint Mary's	Kezar Stadium; San Francisco, CA	T 6–6	59,000	
December 3	at San Francisco	Kezar Stadium; San Francisco, CA	W 7–0	5,000	
December 25	at Hawaii All-Stars		W 16–6		
January 1, 1934	at Hawaii	Honolulu Stadium; Honolulu, Territory of Hawaii	W 26–7	12,755	
