= 1933 San Francisco State Golden Gaters football team =

American college football season

1933 San Francisco State Golden Gaters football
- Conference: Independent
- Record: 2–6
- Head coach: Dave Cox (3rd season)
- Home stadium: Ewing Field

1933 Western college football independents records
	Conf.			Overall
Team	W	L	T	W		L		T
Cal Poly		–		7	–	0	–	0
Loyola (CA)		–		7	–	2	–	1
Santa Clara		–		6	–	2	–	1
Saint Mary's		–		6	–	3	–	1
Hawaii		–		4	–	3	–	0
Columbia (OR)		–		4	–	3	–	1
Humboldt State		–		1	–	1	–	0
Gonzaga		–		2	–	6	–	1
San Francisco State		–		2	–	6	–	0
San Francisco		–		1	–	6	–	1

The 1933 San Francisco State Golden Gaters football team represented San Francisco State Teachers College—now known as San Francisco State University—as an independent during the 1933 college football season. Led by third-year head coach Dave Cox, San Francisco State compiled a record of 2–6 and was outscored by its opponents 117 to 23. The Golden Gaters were shut out in five games and failed to score more than a touchdown in seven of their eight games. The team played home games at Ewing Field in San Francisco. Although the "Gator" was voted to be the mascot for the team in 1931, local newspaper articles called the team the "Golden Gaters".

== Schedule ==
Date	Opponent	Site	Result	Source
September 2	Mare Island Marines	Ewing Field; San Francisco, CA	W 14–0	
September 9	San Mateo	Ewing Field; San Francisco, CA	L 0–19	
September 15	at Marin	Kentfield, CA	L 0–20	
September 22	at Modesto	Modesto, CA	L 0–14	
September 30	Humboldt State	Albee Stadium; Eureka, CA	W 7–0	
October 7	at San Jose State	Spartan Stadium; San Jose, CA	L 0–44	
October 14	Santa Rosa	Ewing Field; San Francisco, CA	L 2–6	
October 21	Chico State	Ewing Field; San Francisco, CA	L 0–14	
