= 1933 Chico State Wildcats football team =

American college football season

1933 Chico State Wildcats football
- Conference: Far Western Conference
- Record: 2–6 (1–3 FWC)
- Head coach: Art Acker (11th season)
- Home stadium: College Field

1933 Far Western Conference football standings
	Conf.					Overall
Team	W		L		T	W		L		T
Nevada $	3	–	0	–	0	4	–	4	–	0
San Jose State	3	–	1	–	0	4	–	4	–	0
Pacific (CA)	3	–	2	–	0	5	–	5	–	0
Fresno State	1	–	2	–	0	5	–	4	–	0
Chico State	1	–	3	–	0	2	–	6	–	0
Cal Aggies	1	–	4	–	0	2	–	5	–	0
$ – Conference champion

The 1933 Chico State Wildcats football team represented Chico State Teachers College—now known as California State University, Chico—as a member of the Far Western Conference (FWC) during the 1933 college football season. Led by 11th-year head coach Art Acker, Chico State compiled an overall record of 2–6 with a mark of 1–3 in conference play, placing fifth in the FWC. The team was outscored by its opponents 77 to 21 for the season. The Wildcats played home games at College Field in Chico, California.

== Schedule ==
Date	Opponent	Site	Result	Attendance	Source
September 30	Menlo*	College Field; Chico, CA	L 0–2		
October 7	Sacramento*	College Field; Chico, CA	L 0–7		
October 14	at Cal Aggies	A Street field; Davis, CA	L 0–13		
October 21	at San Francisco State*	Ewing Field; San Francisco, CA	W 14–0		
October 27	at Pacific (CA)	Baxter Stadium; Stockton, CA	L 0–14		
November 4	at Oregon Normal*	McArthur Field; Monmouth, OR	L 0–20		
November 11	at Nevada	Mackay Stadium (Note: This stadium is the predecessor to the current Mackay Stadium, which was opened for the 1966 season.); Reno, NV	L 0–21	4,000	
November 30	San Jose State	College Field; Chico, CA	W 7–0		
*Non-conference game
