= 1933 Loyola Lions football team =

American college football season

1933 Loyola Lions football
- Conference: Independent
- Record: 7–2–1
- Head coach: Tom Lieb (4th season)
- Home stadium: Wrigley Field

1933 Western college football independents records
	Conf.			Overall
Team	W	L	T	W		L		T
Cal Poly		–		7	–	0	–	0
Loyola (CA)		–		7	–	2	–	1
Santa Clara		–		6	–	2	–	1
Saint Mary's		–		6	–	3	–	1
Hawaii		–		4	–	3	–	0
Columbia (OR)		–		4	–	3	–	1
Humboldt State		–		1	–	1	–	0
Gonzaga		–		2	–	6	–	1
San Francisco State		–		2	–	6	–	0
San Francisco		–		1	–	6	–	1

The 1933 Loyola Lions football team was an American football team that represented Loyola University of Los Angeles (now known as Loyola Marymount University) as an independent during the 1933 college football season. In their fourth season under head coach Tom Lieb, the Lions compiled a 7–2–1 record.

== Schedule ==
Date	Opponent	Site	Result	Attendance	Source
September 22	Caltech	Wrigley Field; Los Angeles, CA	W 45–0	5,000	
September 30	at USC	Los Angeles Memorial Coliseum; Los Angeles, CA	L 0–18	65,000	
October 6	Arizona	Wrigley Field; Los Angeles, CA	W 14–13	5,000	
October 13	Nevada	Wrigley Field; Los Angeles, CA	W 21–0	6,000	
October 21	at UCLA	Los Angeles Memorial Coliseum; Los Angeles, CA	L 7–20	30,000	
October 28	at New Mexico	University Stadium; Albuquerque, NM	W 43–7	2,000	
November 3	Whittier	Wrigley Field; Los Angeles, CA	W 21–0		
November 12	at San Francisco	Kezar Stadium; San Francisco, CA	T 0–0	5,000	
November 19	at San Diego Marines	San Diego, CA	W 13–6	7,000	
November 24	Pacific (CA)	Wrigley Field; Los Angeles, CA	W 14–7	15,000	
