= 1933 San Jose State Spartans football team =

American college football season

1933 San Jose State Spartans football
- Conference: Far Western Conference
- Record: 4–4 (3–1 FWC)
- Head coach: Dudley DeGroot (2nd season)
- Home stadium: Spartan Stadium

1933 Far Western Conference football standings
	Conf.					Overall
Team	W		L		T	W		L		T
Nevada $	3	–	0	–	0	4	–	4	–	0
San Jose State	3	–	1	–	0	4	–	4	–	0
Pacific (CA)	3	–	2	–	0	5	–	5	–	0
Fresno State	1	–	2	–	0	5	–	4	–	0
Chico State	1	–	3	–	0	2	–	6	–	0
Cal Aggies	1	–	4	–	0	2	–	5	–	0
$ – Conference champion

The 1933 San Jose State Spartans football team represented State Teachers College at San Jose (Note: San Jose State University was known as State Teachers College at San Jose from 1921 to 1934.) during the 1933 college football season.

San Jose State competed in the Far Western Conference (FWC). (Note: The Northern California Athletic Conference (NCAC) was known as the Far Western Conference (FWC) from its founding in 1925 to 1982.) The team was led by head coach Dudley DeGroot, in his second year, and played their home games at Spartan Stadium in San Jose, California. Spartan Stadium, which opened for the first time in 1933, continues to serve as San Jose State's home field as of 2017. The Spartans finished the season with a record of four wins and four losses (4–4, 3–1 FWC). They outscored their opponents 102–78 for the season.

== Schedule ==
Date	Opponent	Site	Result	Attendance	Source
September 23	at Stanford*	Stanford Stadium; Stanford, CA (rivalry)	L 0–27		
September 30	at Sacramento*	Sacramento, CA	L 8–20		
October 7	San Francisco State*	Spartan Stadium; San Jose, CA	W 44–6		
October 16	Pacific (CA)	Spartan Stadium; San Jose, CA (rivalry)	W 12–6		
October 21	California JV*	Spartan Stadium; San Jose, CA	L 0–12		
November 11	at Cal Aggies	A Street field; Davis, CA	W 20–0		
November 18	Fresno State	Spartan Stadium; San Jose, CA (rivalry)	W 18–0	7,000	
November 30	at Chico State	College Field; Chico, CA	L 0–7		
*Non-conference game
