= 1933 Cal Aggies football team =

American college football season

1933 Cal Aggies football
- Conference: Far Western Conference
- Record: 2–5 (1–4 FWC)
- Head coach: Crip Toomey (6th season)
- Captain: Bob Frazer
- Home stadium: A Street field

1933 Far Western Conference football standings
	Conf.					Overall
Team	W		L		T	W		L		T
Nevada $	3	–	0	–	0	4	–	4	–	0
San Jose State	3	–	1	–	0	4	–	4	–	0
Pacific (CA)	3	–	2	–	0	5	–	5	–	0
Fresno State	1	–	2	–	0	5	–	4	–	0
Chico State	1	–	3	–	0	2	–	6	–	0
Cal Aggies	1	–	4	–	0	2	–	5	–	0
$ – Conference champion

The 1933 Cal Aggies football team represented the Northern Branch of the College of Agriculture—now known as the University of California, Davis—as a member of the Far Western Conference (FWC) during the 1933 college football season. Led by sixth-year head coach Crip Toomey, the Aggies compiled an overall record of 2–5 with a mark of 1–1–4 in conference play, placing sixth in the FWC. The team was outscored by its opponents 118 to 40 for the season. The Cal Aggies played home games at A Street field on campus in Davis, California.

== Schedule ==
Date	Time	Opponent	Site	Result	Source
September 30		at California*	California Memorial Stadium; Berkeley, CA	L 0–39	
October 14		Chico State	A Street field; Davis, CA	W 13–0	
October 21	2:00 p.m.	Sacramento*	Sacramento Stadium; Sacramento, CA	W 13–6	
October 28		Fresno State	A Street field; Davis, CA	L 0–20	
November 4		at Pacific (CA)	Baxter Stadium; Stockton, CA	L 7–13	
November 11		San Jose State	A Street field; Davis, CA	L 0–20	
November 18		Nevada	A Street field; Davis, CA	L 7–20	
*Non-conference game; All times are in Pacific time
