= 1933 Nevada Wolf Pack football team =

American college football season

1933 Nevada Wolf Pack football

FWC champion
- Conference: Far Western Conference
- Record: 4–4 (3–0 FWC)
- Head coach: Brick Mitchell (2nd season)
- Home stadium: Mackay Field

1933 Far Western Conference football standings
	Conf.					Overall
Team	W		L		T	W		L		T
Nevada $	3	–	0	–	0	4	–	4	–	0
San Jose State	3	–	1	–	0	4	–	4	–	0
Pacific (CA)	3	–	2	–	0	5	–	5	–	0
Fresno State	1	–	2	–	0	5	–	4	–	0
Chico State	1	–	3	–	0	2	–	6	–	0
Cal Aggies	1	–	4	–	0	2	–	5	–	0
$ – Conference champion

The 1933 Nevada Wolf Pack football team was an American football team that represented the University of Nevada in the Far Western Conference (FWC) during the 1933 college football season. In their second season under head coach Brick Mitchell, the Wolf Pack compiled a 4–4 record (3–0 against conference opponents), was outscored by opponents by a total of 144 to 60, and won the conference championship.

== Schedule ==
Date	Opponent	Site	Result	Attendance	Source
September 22	at San Francisco*	Seals Stadium; San Francisco, CA	W 12–7		
September 30	at California*	California Memorial Stadium; Berkeley, CA	L 0–34		
October 7	Olympic Club*	Mackay Field; Reno, NV	L 0–14	3,500	
October 13	at Loyola (CA)*	Wrigley Field; Los Angeles	L 0–21	6,000	
October 21	Pacific (CA)	Mackay Field; Reno, NV	W 7–0		
October 27	at Saint Mary's*	Kezar Stadium; San Francisco	L 0–61	> 35,000	
November 11	Chico State	Mackay Field; Reno, NV	W 21–0	4,000	
November 18	at Cal Aggies	A Street Field; Davis, CA	W 20–7		
*Non-conference game
