= The Oregon Duck =

Mascot of University of Oregon

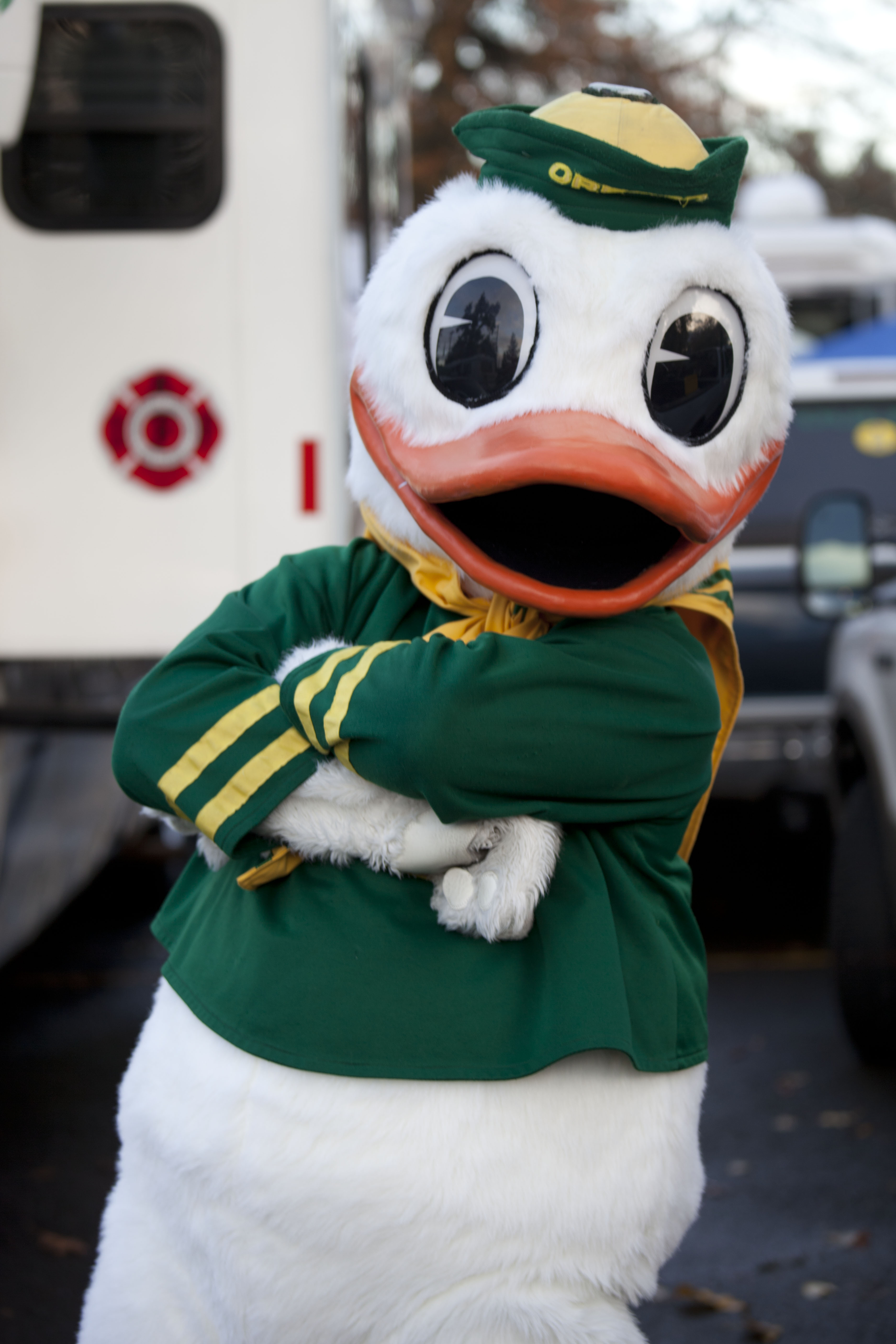
- The Oregon Duck before a Ducks football game
- University: University of Oregon
- Conference: Big Ten
- Description: Anthropomorphic duck
- First seen: 1940
- Website: The Oregon Duck

The Oregon Duck is the mascot of the University of Oregon Ducks athletic program, based on Disney's Donald Duck character through a special license agreement. The mascot wears a green and yellow costume, and a green and yellow beanie cap with the word "Oregon" written on it.

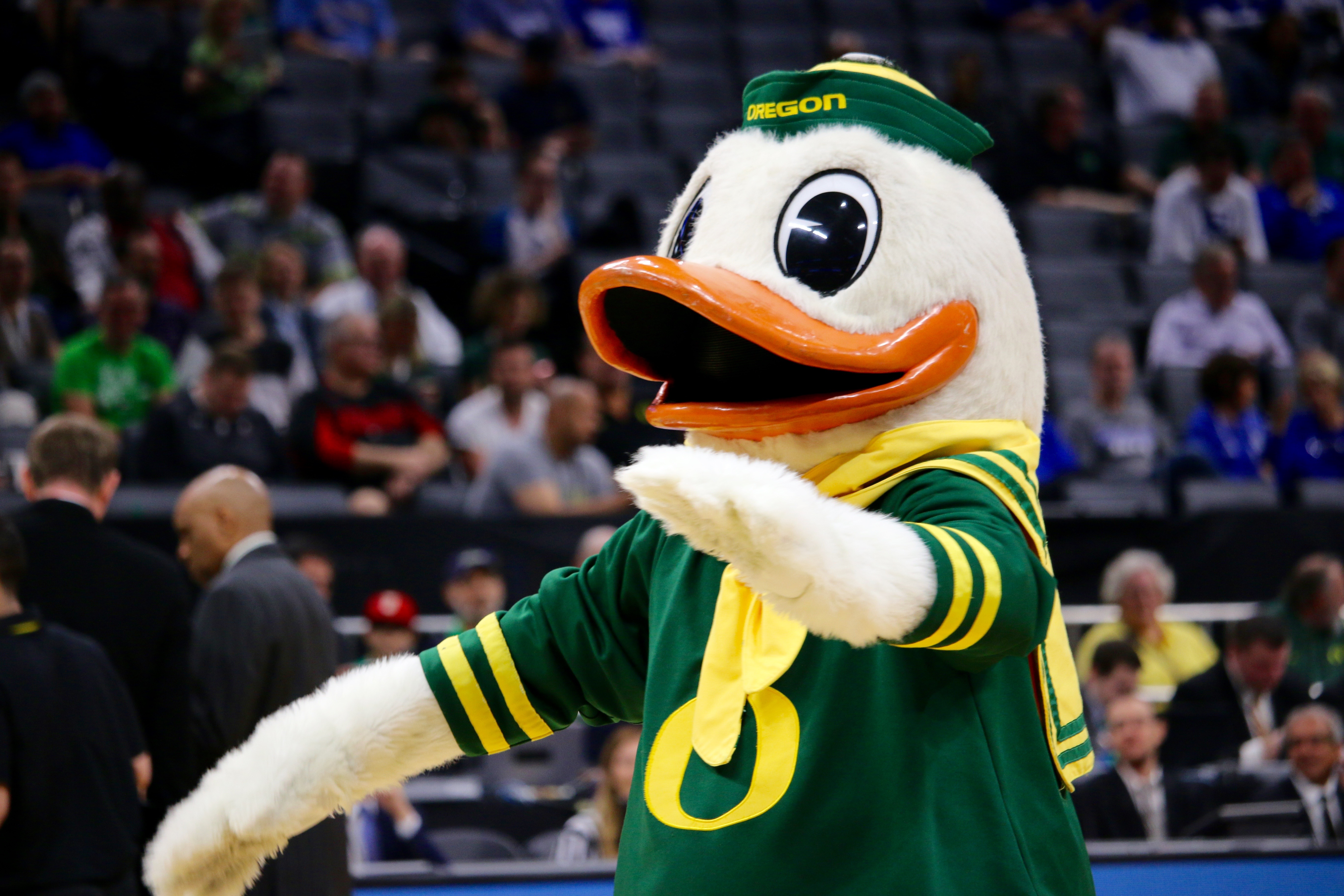
The Oregon Duck at a basketball game in 2017

== Early mascots ==
Oregon teams were originally known as Webfoots, possibly as early as the 1880s. The Webfoots name originally applied to a group of fishermen from the coast of Massachusetts who had been heroes during the American Revolutionary War. When their descendants settled in Oregon's Willamette Valley in the 19th century, the name stayed with them. A naming contest in 1926 won by Oregonian sports editor L. H. Gregory made the Webfoots name official, and a subsequent student vote in 1932 affirmed the nickname, chosen over other suggested nicknames such as Pioneers, Trappers, Lumberjacks, Wolves, and Yellow Jackets.

Ducks, with their webbed feet, began to be associated with the team in the 1920s, and a live white duck named "Puddles" began to appear at sports events. Journalists, especially headline writers, also adopted the shorter Duck nickname.

== Relationship with Disney ==
Beginning in 1940, cartoon drawings of Puddles in student publications began to resemble Donald Duck, and by 1947, Walt Disney was aware of the issue. Capitalizing on his friendship with Disney cartoonist Mike Royer, Oregon athletic director Leo Harris met Disney and reached an informal handshake agreement that granted the University of Oregon permission to use Donald as its sports mascot, naming him Donald Duck.

When Disney lawyers later questioned the agreement in the 1970s, the university produced a photo showing Harris and Disney wearing matching jackets with an Oregon Donald logo. Relying on the photo as evidence of Disney's wishes, in 1973, both parties signed a formal agreement granting the university the right to use Donald's likeness as a symbol for (and restricted to) Oregon sports. The agreement gave Disney control over where the mascot could perform and ensured that the performer inside the costume would "properly represent the Donald Duck character."

In 2010, Disney and the university reached an agreement that removed the costumed Oregon Duck mascot from its association with the Donald trademark, and allowed The Duck to make more public appearances, such as at college mascot competitions. The mascot in graphic art, which is more similar to Donald Duck than the rounder head and body of the costume, is still covered by the trademark agreement.

In 1978, a student cartoonist came up with a new duck image called Mallard Drake, but students chose Donald as the official mascot by a 2–to–1 margin.

== Controversy ==
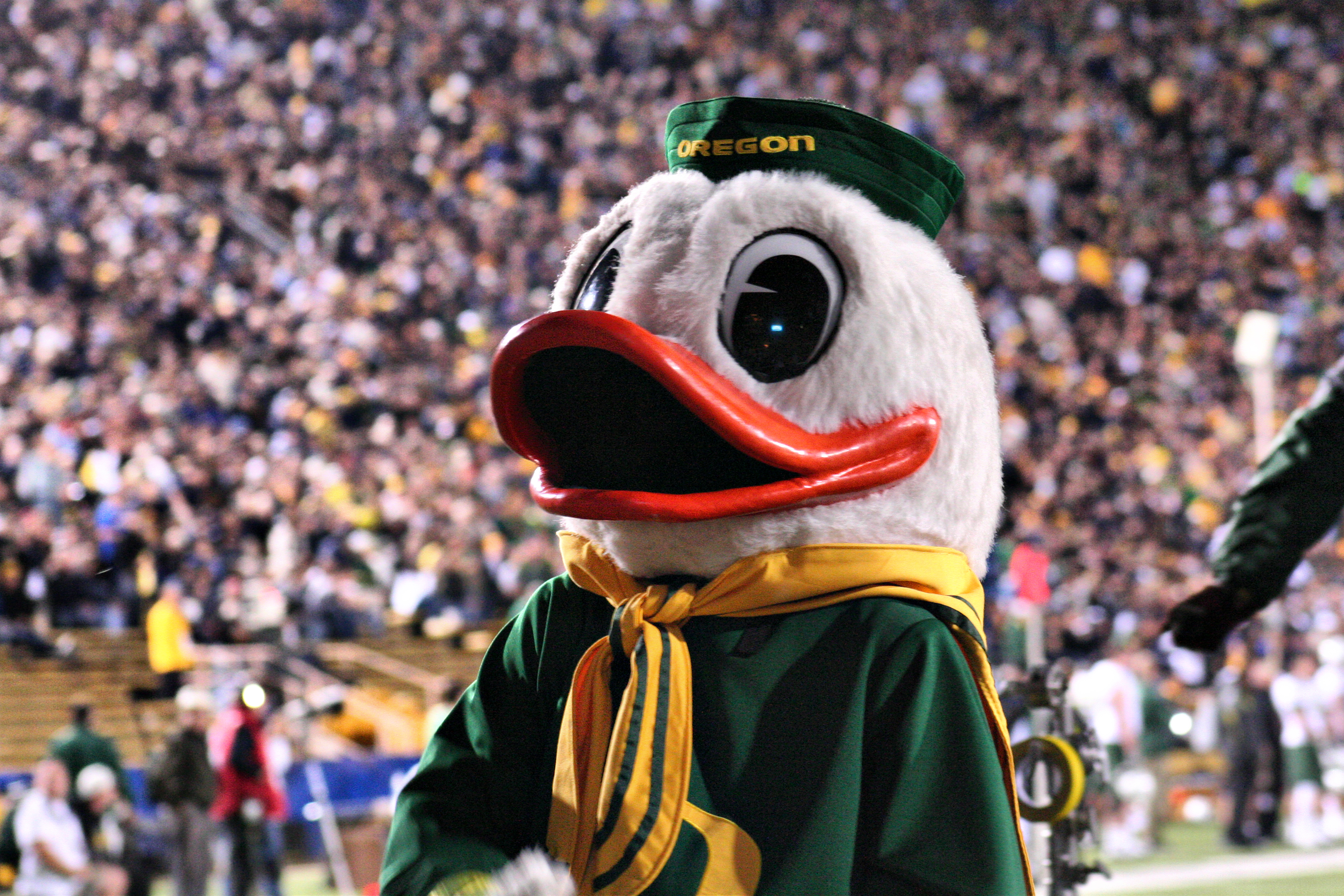
The Oregon Duck during a California–Oregon game on November 13, 2011 at Autzen Stadium.

During the 2007 season opener, The Duck got into a fistfight with Shasta, the mascot for the Houston Cougars, for seemingly mimicking the Duck's routine of doing push-ups after the mascot's team scores. Footage of the attack became very popular on YouTube for several weeks. The Duck was suspended for a game and the student inside the costume received an unspecified punishment.

Late in the 2009 season, students of the university created a video, I Love My Ducks, in which The Duck made an appearance. Due to the agreement with Disney in place at the time, the creators had to remove the video from YouTube. However, by that time, the video had "gone viral" and coach Chip Kelly requested the video be played at the Ducks' final game of that season, the Civil War.

== Other mascots ==
A Nike-designed futuristic Spandex-costume-wearing duck called Mandrake (and nicknamed "Duck Vader" and "RoboDuck" by the student body), began appearing at athletic events in 2002, but had disappeared by 2003.

== See also ==
- List of duck mascots
