= 1933 Columbia Irish football team =

American college football season

1933 Columbia Irish football
- Conference: Independent
- Record: 4–3
- Head coach: Gene Murphy (7th season)
- Home stadium: Multnomah Stadium, Vaughn Street Park

1933 Western college football independents records
	Conf.			Overall
Team	W	L	T	W		L		T
Cal Poly		–		7	–	0	–	0
Loyola (CA)		–		7	–	2	–	1
Santa Clara		–		6	–	2	–	1
Saint Mary's		–		6	–	3	–	1
Hawaii		–		4	–	3	–	0
Columbia (OR)		–		4	–	3	–	1
Humboldt State		–		1	–	1	–	0
Gonzaga		–		2	–	6	–	1
San Francisco State		–		2	–	6	–	0
San Francisco		–		1	–	6	–	1

The 1933 Columbia Irish football team was an American football team that represented Columbia University (later renamed the University of Portland) as an independent during the 1933 college football season. In its seventh year under head coach Gene Murphy, the team compiled a 4–3 record. The team played its home games at Vaughn Street Park and Multnomah Stadium in Portland, Oregon.

== Schedule ==
Date	Opponent	Site	Result	Attendance	Source
September 30	Pacific (OR)	Multnomah Stadium; Portland, OR	L 6–7		
October 7	at Oregon	Hayward Field; Eugene, OR	L 7–14		
October 14	Albany	Vaughn Street Park; Portland, OR	W 13–0		
October 20	Willamette	Vaughn Street Park; Portland, OR	W 13–0		
November 4	Pacific Lutheran	Portland, OR	W 38–0		
November 10	Linfield	Portland, OR	W 12–0		
November 19	Gonzaga	Vaughn Street Park; Portland, OR	L 8–13		
