= John Caine (athletic director) =

American college athletics coach and administrator (1924–2010)

Biographical details
- Born: October 9, 1924; Ashland, Kentucky, U.S.
- Died: July 9, 2010 (aged 85); Elkhorn, Idaho, U.S.

Playing career
- 1946–1947: Louisville
- 1948–1949: UCLA

Coaching career (HC unless noted)

Men's basketball
- 1951–1958: Bellflower HS (CA)
- 1958–1964: Cerritos College
- 1966–1967: Lea College
- 1967–1968: Eastern Illinois

Administrative career (AD unless noted)
- 1968–1972: Cal State Fullerton
- 1972–1976: San Jose State
- 1976–1981: Oregon
- 1983–1989: UC Irvine

John E. Caine (October 9, 1924 – July 9, 2010) was an American coach and administrator who was the head men's basketball coach at Cerritos College (1958–1964), Lea College (1966–1967), and Eastern Illinois (1967–1968) and athletic director at Cal State Fullerton (1968–1972), San Jose State (1972–1976), Oregon (1976–1981), and UC Irvine (1983–1989).

== Early life ==
Caine was born in Ashland, Kentucky on October 9, 1924. He attended Paul G. Blazer High School, where he was a member of the basketball team. He graduated in 1942 and joined the United States Army in 1943. He served in the European theatre during World War II and was discharged in February 1946.

Caine attended the University of Louisville and was a member of the Louisville Cardinals men's basketball team during the 1946–47 season. He transferred to University of California, Los Angeles to be closer to Marilyn Bergen, whom he married in 1948. Caine was a redshirt member of the 1948–49 UCLA Bruins men's basketball team. He earned his undergraduate degree in 1950 and his master's degree in 1952.

== Coaching ==
Caine began his coaching career in 1951 at Bellflower High School in Bellflower, California. From 1958 to 1964, he was the head men's basketball coach at Cerritos College. He compiled an overall record of 113–64. He assisted with the Northern Colorado Bears men's basketball while working on his doctorate in physical education. He then spent one season as head basketball coach at Lea College. In 1967, he joined the staff at Eastern Illinois University as an associate professor in the school of health, physical educator, and recreation and coordinator of student teachers. When head basketball coach Rex Darling resigned, Caine took the job on an interim basis.

== Athletic director ==
On May 24, 1968, Caine was named athletic director at California State University, Fullerton. He took the same job at San Jose State University on July 1, 1972. In 1973, he hired Darryl Rogers, who led the Spartans football team to its first winning season since 1961.

On February 26, 1976, it was announced that Caine would become the athletic director at University of Oregon effective April 1. During Caine's tenure at Oregon, the athletic department generated $18.5 million, increased annual revenue from $2.1 million to $5 million, and secured $6 million in pledges for a new basketball arena (which was never built). He was awarded a six-year contract in 1979. The athletic department lost $163,766 during the 1978–79 academic year and $200,040 in 1979–80.

In 1980, seven members of the Oregon Ducks football team were indicted for credit card fraud and three others were declared ineligible for the entire season because they received airline tickets from a secret travel fund during their recruitment. Two former assistant basketball coaches were accused of theft of state funds. An internal investigation found that eleven athletes, most of them football players, had received fake credits between 1977 and 1979. The football team was placed on probation by the Pac-10 Conference for two years, ordered to forfeit all victories for the previous three seasons, stripped of three grants-in-aid, and banned from the postseason in 1980 as a result of the academic fraud investigation. Caine was never implicated in any of these scandals.

On March 23, 1981, Caine announced that he would be resigning effective April 1, citing the university's desire to have someone else run the department given the budget deficit. Shortly after his resignation, Oregon eliminated its baseball, women's soccer, men's gymnastics and women's golf programs to cut costs.

After leaving Oregon, Caine served as the executive director of the San Diego Hall of Champions. In 1983, he returned to intercollegiate athletics as University of California, Irvine's director of athletics. He remained in this position until 1989, when he was reassigned to the position of special assistant to the chancellor for athletic policy and planning.

== Later life and death ==
Caine retired in 1990 and moved to Elkhorn, Idaho. In 2000, he was inducted into the National Association of Collegiate Directors of Athletics Hall of Fame. He died on July 9, 2010, from complications of Parkinson's disease.
