= Leo Harris =

American athlete, coach, and athletic director (1904–1990)

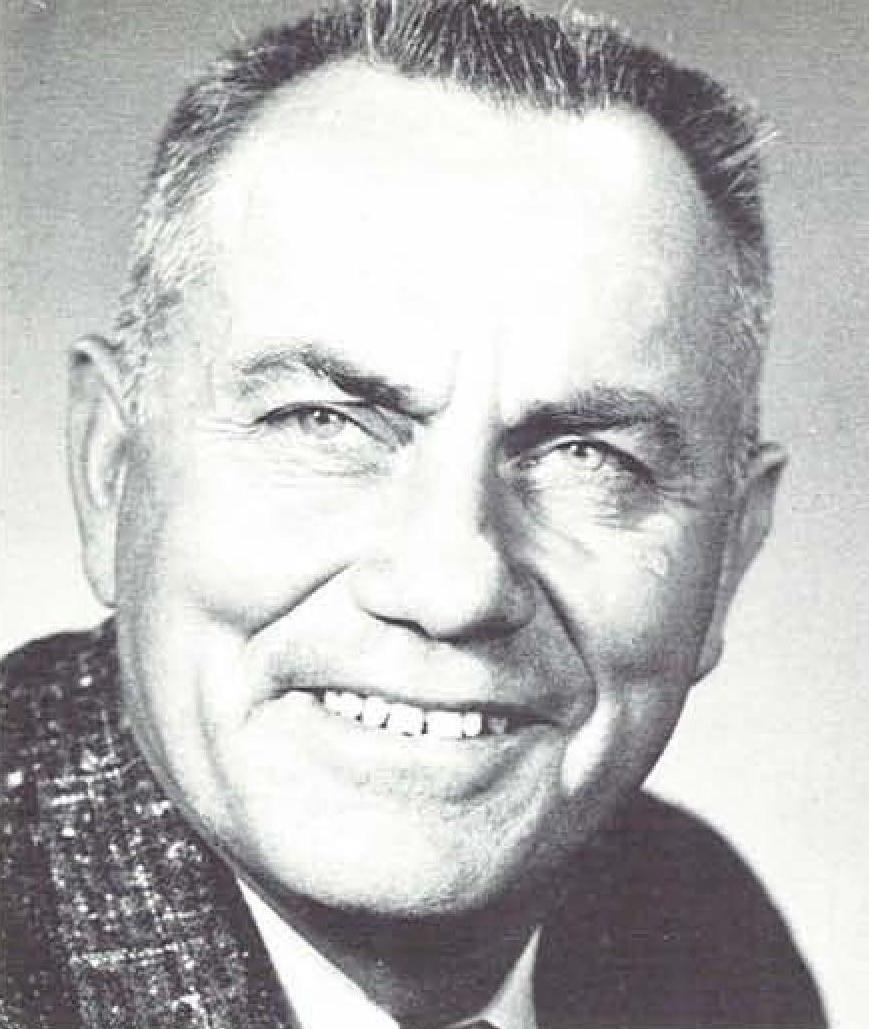

Biographical details
- Born: August 6, 1904; Santa Cruz, California, U.S.
- Died: April 22, 1990 (aged 85); Carmel, California, U.S.

Playing career

Football
- 1926–1927: Stanford
- Position: Tackle

Coaching career (HC unless noted)

Football
- 1933–1935: Fresno State

Basketball
- 1932–1933: Fresno State

Administrative career (AD unless noted)
- 1947–1967: Oregon

Head coaching record
- Overall: 18–9–1 (football); 7–7 (basketball)

Accomplishments and honors

Championships
- Football; 2 Far Western (1934–1935)

Leo A. Harris (August 6, 1904 – April 22, 1990) was an American athlete, coach, and athletic director. He played college football at Stanford University, coached football and basketball at Fresno State College, and was the first athletic director for the University of Oregon, bringing success to a financially troubled system. He was also known for his handshake deal with Walt Disney that permitted the University of Oregon to use the likeness of Donald Duck as the basis for its mascot, the Oregon Duck.

== Playing and coaching career ==
Harris was a fullback and guard at Santa Cruz High School in Santa Cruz, California. He attended Stanford University, where he played tackle for legendary coach "Pop" Warner in 1925 and 1926.

Following his collegiate playing career, Harris was football coach at Fresno State College from 1933 to 1935, winning Far West Conference championships the last two years. Harris also coached Fresno State's basketball program.

== Oregon's first athletic director ==
In 1947, Harris was named athletic director at the University of Oregon, the first person to hold that title. At that time, Oregon's athletic department was in serious financial trouble. Through fundraising and careful planning, Harris expanded both the quality of the University's athletic programs as well as its facilities.

His most significant achievement was the construction of a new football stadium to replace aging Hayward Field. His efforts, beginning with procurement of property across the Willamette River from campus and continuing with fundraising and governmental negotiations, resulted in the construction of Autzen Stadium, completed in 1967. Harris also oversaw expansion of McArthur Court and improvements to Hayward Field and the baseball team's Howe Field.

Harris was also noted for striking a handshake deal with Walt Disney in 1947 that allowed Oregon to use the likeness of Donald Duck as the University's athletic mascot, The Oregon Duck. When Disney lawyers in the 1970s discovered that no written contract existed, the university produced a photograph of Harris alongside Walt Disney wearing a Donald-emblazoned Oregon jacket as proof that an agreement did exist. From that photo evidence, a formal contract licensing Donald's use by the university was created.

== Legacy ==
Harris served as Oregon's athletic director for 20 years, stepping down in 1967, shortly before Autzen Stadium was completed. Today, the stadium's address is on Leo Harris Parkway. Harris died at his Carmel, California retirement home in 1990. He was inducted into the University of Oregon Athletic Hall of Fame in 1992, and the Oregon Sports Hall of Fame that same year.

== Head coaching record ==
=== Football ===
Year	Team	Overall	Conference	Standing	Bowl/playoffs
Fresno State Bulldogs (Far Western Conference) (1933–1935)
1933	Fresno State	5–4	1–2	4th	
1934	Fresno State	7–2–1	3–0–1	1st	
1935	Fresno State	6–3	4–0	1st	
Fresno State:		18–9–1	8–2–1		
Total:		18–9–1			
National championship Conference title Conference division title or championship game berth
