= Rob Mullens =

Athletic director at the University of Oregon

Current position
- Title: Athletic director
- Team: Oregon
- Conference: Big Ten

Biographical details
- Born: 1968 or 1969 (age 57–58); Morgantown, West Virginia, U.S.
- Education: West Virginia University

Administrative career (AD unless noted)
- 1996–2002: Maryland (senior assoc. AD)
- 2002–2006: Kentucky (assoc. AD)
- 2006–2010: Kentucky (deputy AD)
- 2010–present: Oregon

Rob Mullens is the current athletic director at the University of Oregon. He has presided over the most successful period in Oregon history, dubbed by some as the "Decade of the Duck." He was hired on July 15, 2010 from Kentucky where he was the Wildcats' deputy director of athletics.

Mullens was named the third Chair of the College Football Playoff Selection Committee in January 2018.

== Personal life ==
A native of Morgantown, West Virginia, Mullens earned a bachelor’s degree in business administration and a master’s in sport management from West Virginia University in 1991 and 1993, respectively. He and his wife, Jane, have two sons, Cooper and Tanner.
