= 1933 Fresno State Bulldogs football team =

American college football season

1933 Fresno State Bulldogs football
- Conference: Far Western Conference
- Record: 5–4 (1–2 FWC)
- Head coach: Leo Harris (1st season)
- Home stadium: Fresno State College Stadium

1933 Far Western Conference football standings
	Conf.					Overall
Team	W		L		T	W		L		T
Nevada $	3	–	0	–	0	4	–	4	–	0
San Jose State	3	–	1	–	0	4	–	4	–	0
Pacific (CA)	3	–	2	–	0	5	–	5	–	0
Fresno State	1	–	2	–	0	5	–	4	–	0
Chico State	1	–	3	–	0	2	–	6	–	0
Cal Aggies	1	–	4	–	0	2	–	5	–	0
$ – Conference champion

The 1933 Fresno State Bulldogs football team represented Fresno State Normal School—now known as California State University, Fresno—during the 1933 college football season.

Fresno State competed in the Far Western Conference (FWC). (Note: The Northern California Athletic Conference (NCAC) was known as the Far Western Conference (FWC) from its founding in 1925 to 1982.) The 1933 team was led by first-year head coach Leo Harris and played home games at Fresno State College Stadium (Note: Ratcliffe Stadium was known as Fresno State College Stadium from 1926 to 1940.) on the campus of Fresno City College in Fresno, California. They finished the season with a record of five wins and four losses (5–4, 1–2 FWC). The Bulldogs outscored their opponents 98–71 for the season.

== Schedule ==
Date	Opponent	Site	Result	Attendance	Source
September 29	Caltech*	Fresno State College Stadium; Fresno, CA	W 26–6	5,000	
October 7	La Verne*	Fresno State College Stadium; Fresno, CA	W 14–7		
October 14	California JV*	Fresno State College Stadium; Fresno, CA	L 0–7		
October 21	Pomona*	Fresno State College Stadium; Fresno, CA	W 24–0		
October 28	at Cal Aggies	A Street field; Davis, CA	W 20–0		
November 4	at Arizona State*	High school stadium; Phoenix, AZ	L 7–21		
November 11	Washburn*	Fresno State College Stadium; Fresno, CA	W 7–0	7,500	
November 18	at San Jose State	Spartan Stadium; San Jose, CA (rivalry)	L 0–18	7,000	
November 30	Pacific (CA)	Fresno State College Stadium; Fresno, CA	L 0–12	8,000	
*Non-conference game
