= Jane Sanders Stadium =

Outdoor softball stadium in Eugene, Oregon, U.S.

- The Jane
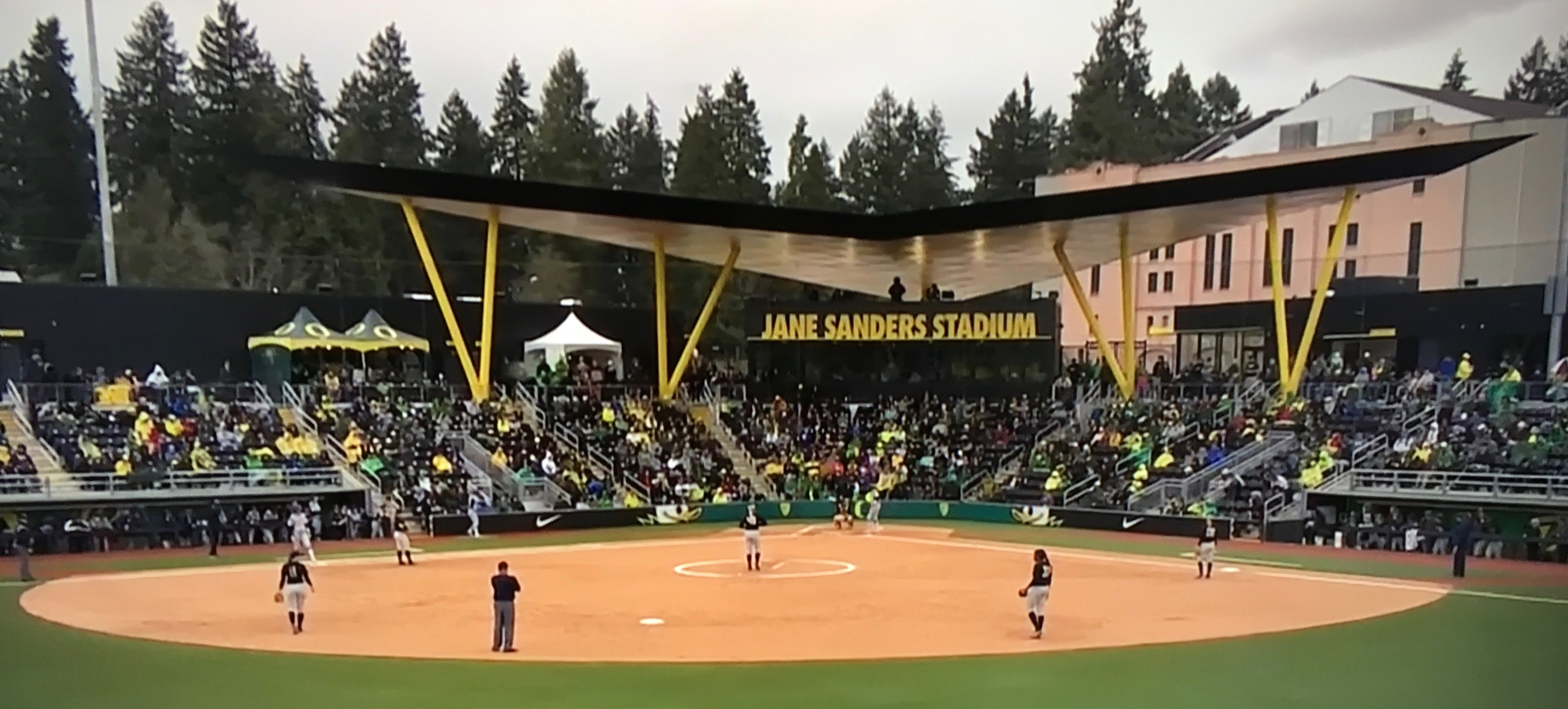

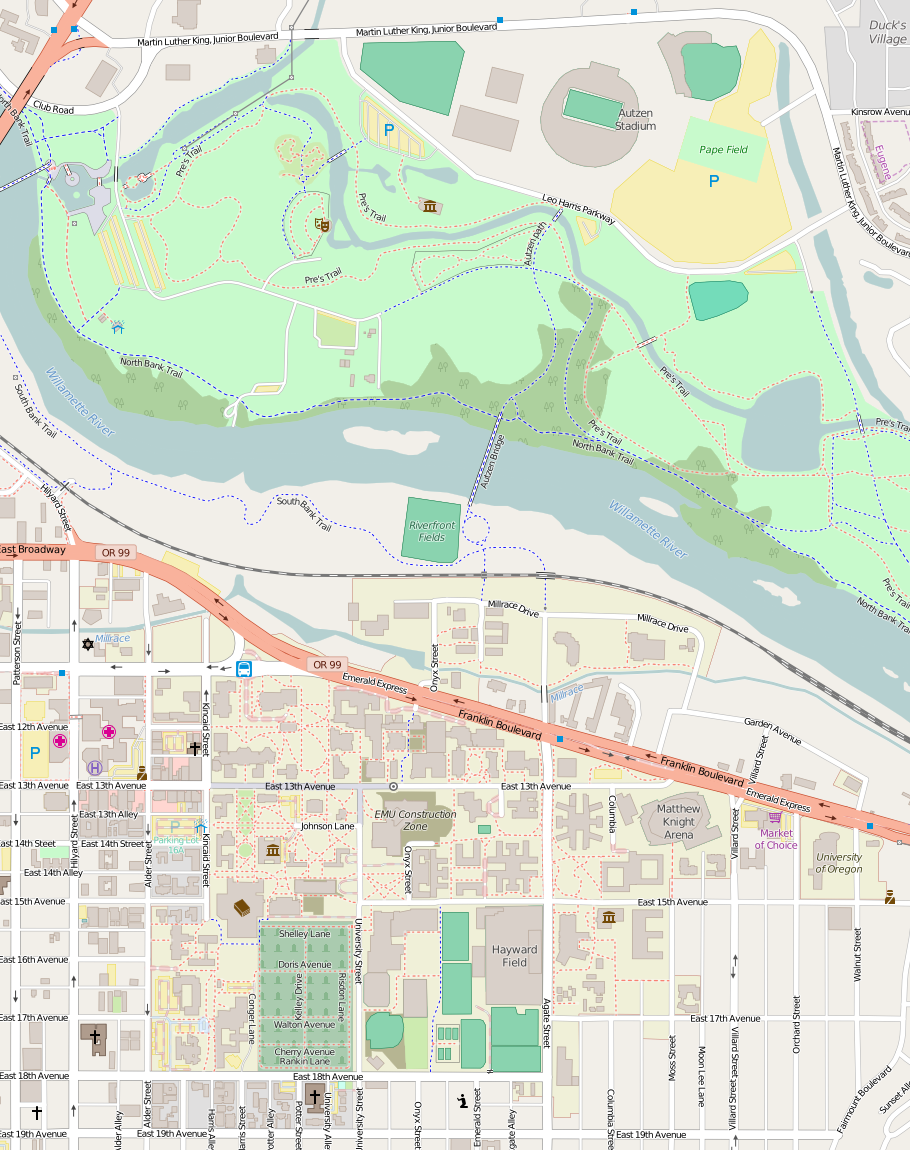
- Location on UO campus in Eugene, Oregon
- Former names: Howe Field
- Location: 1677 University Street; Eugene, Oregon, U.S.
- Coordinates: 44°02′27″N 123°04′26″W
- Owner: University of Oregon
- Capacity: 2,500
- Surface: Clay infield, artificial turf outfield
- Scoreboard: 12-by-36-foot (3.7 m × 11.0 m) video board

Construction
- Groundbreaking: June 4, 2014
- Built: 2014–2016
- Opened: 24 March 2016
- Expanded: 2017–2018
- Cost: $17.2 million
- Architect: SRG Partnership
- General contractor: Howard S. Wright

Jane Sanders Stadium, nicknamed "The Jane", is an outdoor softball stadium in Eugene, Oregon, United States. Located on the south side of the University of Oregon (UO) campus at 18th and University, it is the home field of the Oregon Ducks of the Big Ten Conference.

Robert C. "Bob" Sanders donated more than $16 million to build the stadium, a memorial to his late wife Jane Sanders, who had been a longtime fan of Ducks softball. Former Ducks softball coach Becky Sisley matched other donations, up to $200,000. The total cost of the stadium was $17.2 million.

The stadium was opened in 2016 and expanded a year later with an additional 1,000 permanent general admission seats in the outfield. The official seating capacity is 2,500.

== History ==
Jane Sanders (1928–2013)

On June 7, 2014, US$10 million gift from alum and football player Robert Sanders supported a new stadium project to be named in honor of his wife, Olive Jane (Daggett) Sanders. They met at the University of Oregon, where she was a member of Pi Beta Phi, cheerleader for the Ducks, class of 1950, and he was a fullback on the football team, class of 1951.

The Sanders were successful in the lumber industry with their business, RSG Forest Products Inc., on the west coast. Jane frequently attended Ducks softball games with her grandchildren; Bob wanted to honor her and support the Oregon Ducks. In May 2016, Bob Sanders donated an additional $6 million toward completion of the stadium. The total cost of construction was $17.2 million.

=== Howe Field ===
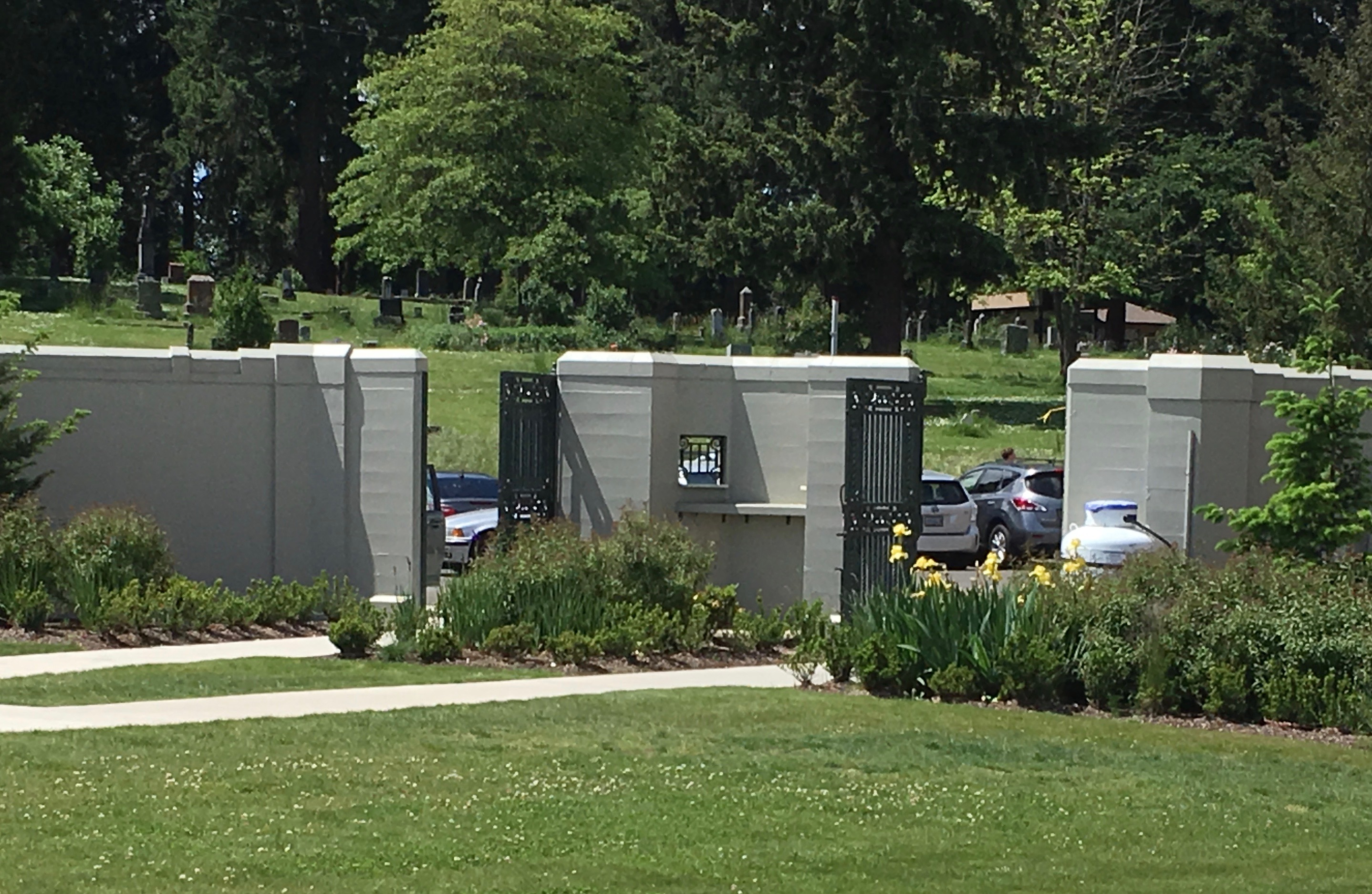
Gates at entrance to Jane Sanders Stadium, only remaining structure from Howe Field

Jane Sanders Stadium was constructed on the site of the University's Howe Field stadium, which was built in 1935 with a $10,000 grant from the Works Progress Administration. Howe Field is still the name of the field itself, according to the Daily Emerald.

Named for Professor Herbert C. Howe of the English faculty, who served as faculty athletics representative, Howe Field had been used by the Ducks baseball team until Oregon dropped the men's baseball program in 1981. Describing the small field south of Mac Court as "a welcoming place for fans and hitters", former Duck shortstop Steve Wolf said it was "a kind of 'little Fenway' ". However, it had no dugouts, no bathrooms, no clubhouse, and the grass was mowed by the players themselves.

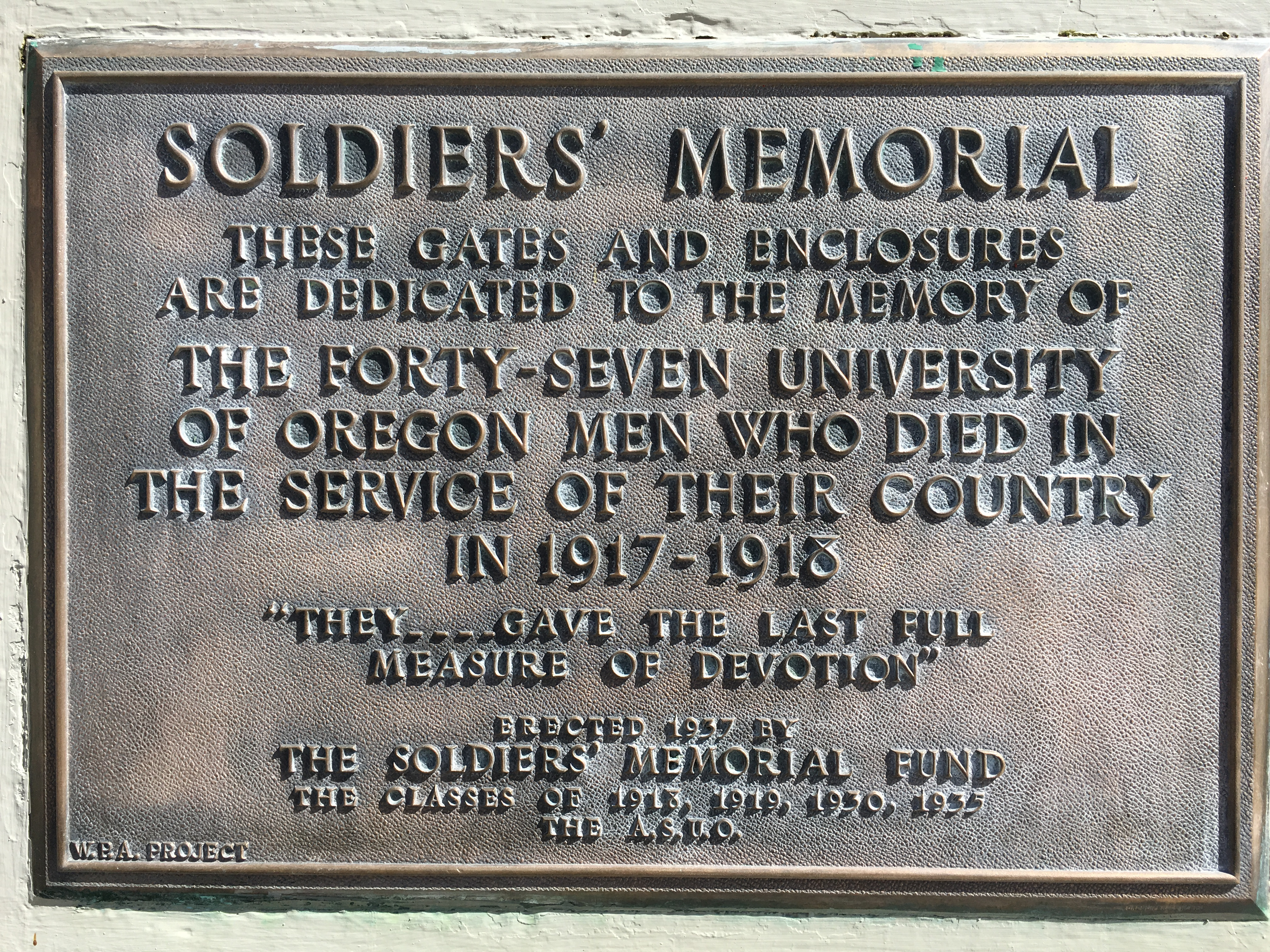
Memorial plaque dedicated to soldiers who died in World War I

In 1974, Oregon had added the varsity women's softball program, which for four years used Amazon Park, a city-owned park in Eugene, and a green space between Pioneer Cemetery and Gerlinger Hall as the softball home diamond. In 1978 a space south of Hayward Field was designated for the softball program. By 1987, the expanding Ducks track program needed more space, and the softball area at Hayward was converted to the hammer area.

The softball program then moved to Howe Field, where dugouts were added, and temporary lights were brought in for telecast games. These improvements were funded by Bob Sanders, the alumnus who later also donated funding for the new Jane Sanders Stadium, according to the first softball coach at Oregon, Becky Sisley. Players used portable toilets, and changed in the locker room at the aging Mac Court. The Register Guard reported Howe Field had "no permanent bathrooms or on-site locker rooms, limited concessions, a small press box and little space for live television and radio broadcasts", and, "In recent years, Howe Field became a symbol of benign neglect." The last remnants of Howe Field, the historic iron gates, are located in front of the new stadium's courtyard.

== "The Jane" ==
Jane Sanders Stadium opened March 4, 2016, earning praise from ESPN, who compared it to similar ballparks in the Southeastern Conference.

=== Construction ===
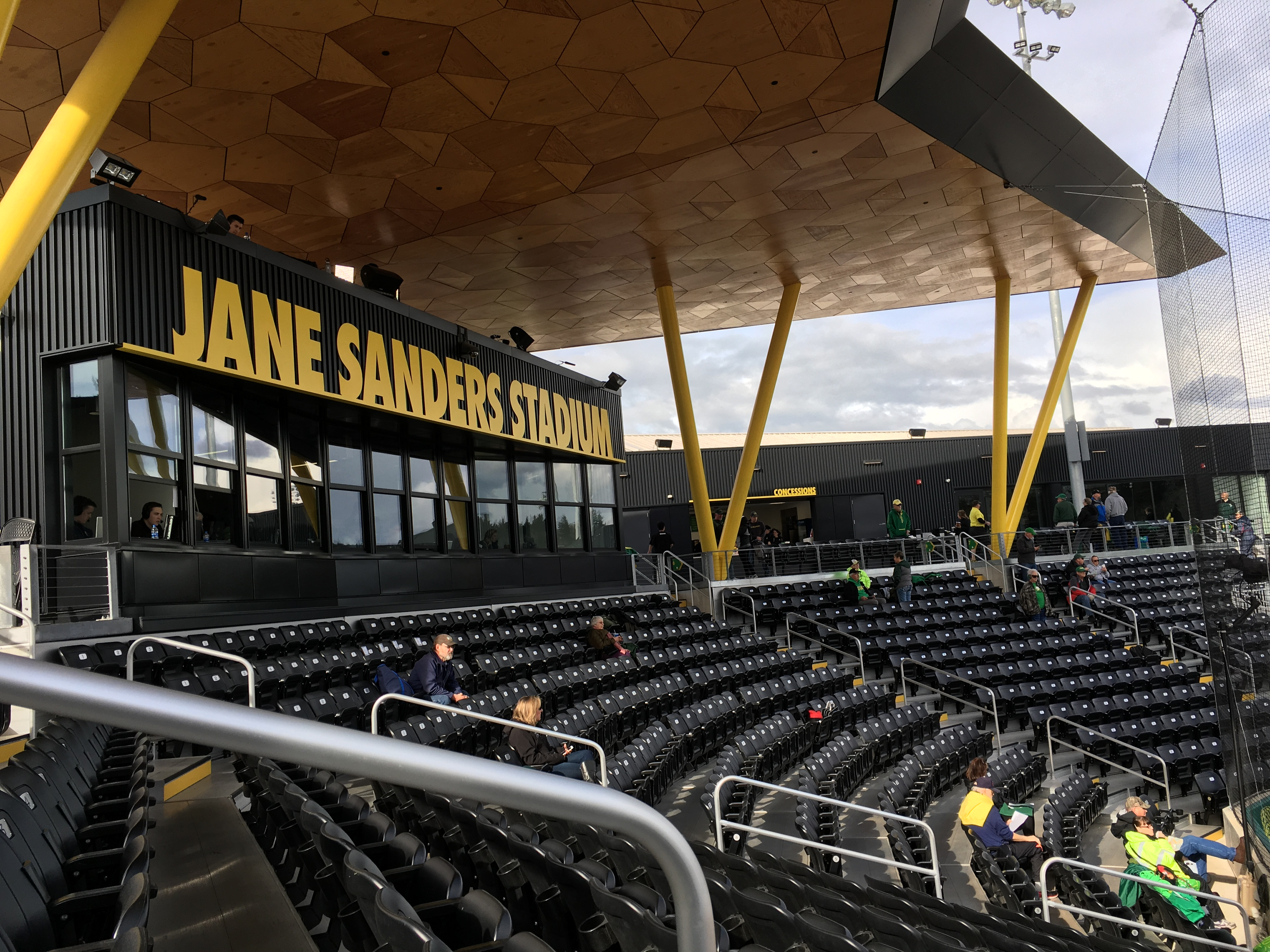
The duck-wing canopy is lined with a mosaic of wood inlay home-plate shapes, with a nod to the lumber business of Bob and Jane Sanders.

On April 30, 2015, the athletic department of the University revealed drawings of Jane Sanders Stadium, planned to replace facilities at Howe Field. Designed by SRG Partnership, the project was managed by Chris Hartson, and the university hired general contractor Howard S. Wright of Dallas to build the stadium.

The new stadium was designed with features not formerly available at Howe Field, such as locker rooms and an indoor practice facility, as well as media rooms. The stadium was built to meet needs described by former coach Mike White, "...a player development center indoors, a place where we can have batting cages, and for recruiting, a place we can have a great team room". The upper level of the stadium includes concessions and restrooms, as well as a multi-purpose room, a video room, and offices for coaches.

Jane Sanders Stadium opened March 24, 2016, with 1,500 permanent seats available. Temporary bleachers adding another 1,000 seats were constructed by April 1, 2016.

=== Addition of "The Bob" ===
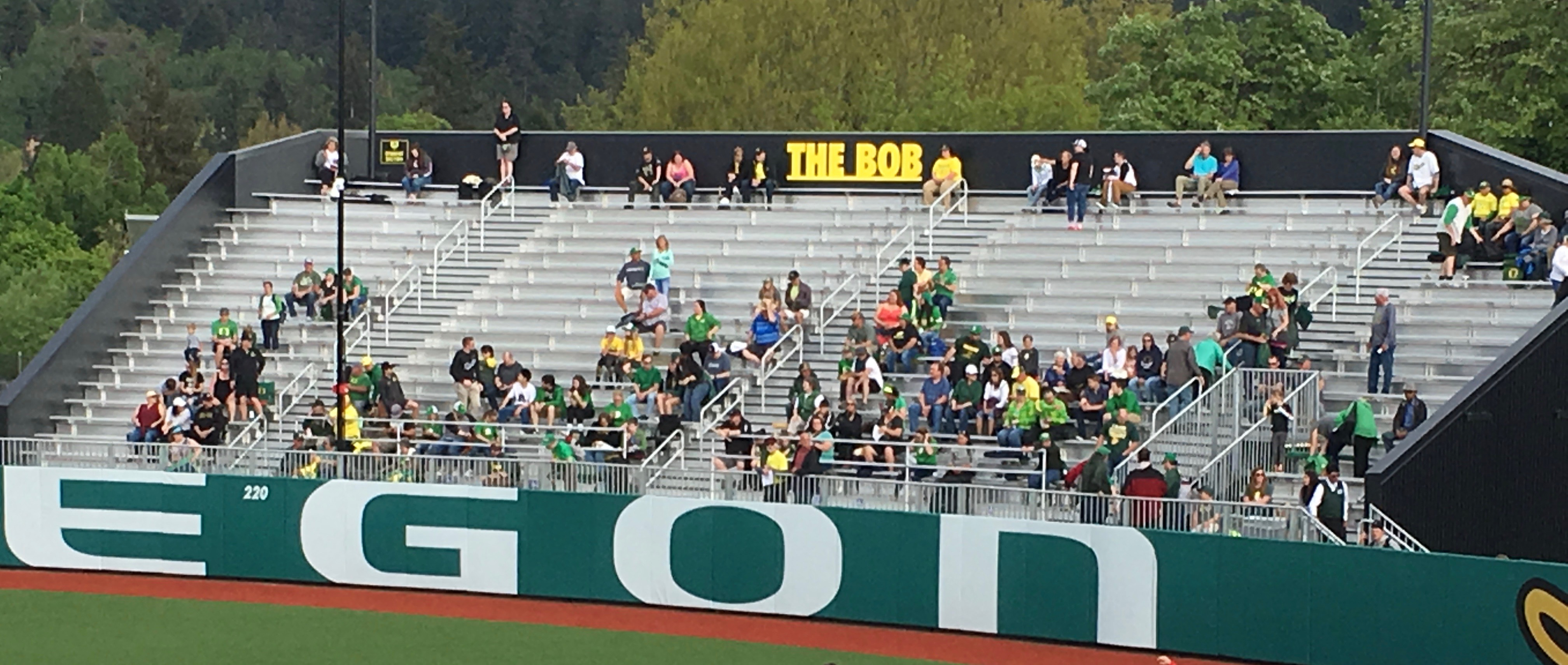
Outfield bleacher seating nicknamed for donor Bob Sanders

With a donation from Bob Sanders, in addition to his previous gifts of $16 million, construction on permanent outfield seating was announced in July 2017, and built in time for the 2018 season. The permanent seating also includes bathrooms and a concession stand.

=== Facilities ===
The stadium has a seated capacity of 1,483 people, including several suites and a grandstand that is covered by a V-shaped canopy decorated with wood cutouts in the shape of the home plate. The stadium's videoboard measures 12 by 36 feet (3.7 by 11.0 m) and cost $250,000.

=== Playing surface ===
The stadium has a clay infield and artificial turf in the outfield, as requested by former coach Mike White, making it playable in Pacific Northwest weather conditions.

== Attendance ==
Game attendance averaged 2,334 in the 2018 season.

== See also ==
- List of NCAA Division I softball programs
