= 1927 Utah Utes football team =

American college football season

1927 Utah Utes football
- Conference: Rocky Mountain Conference
- Record: 3–3–1 (3–1–1 RMC)
- Head coach: Ike Armstrong (3rd season)
- Home stadium: Ute Stadium

1927 Rocky Mountain Conference football standings
	Conf.					Overall
Team	W		L		T	W		L		T
Colorado Agricultural $	7	–	1	–	0	7	–	1	–	0
Denver	5	–	1	–	0	5	–	2	–	0
Montana State	3	–	1	–	0	4	–	4	–	0
Utah	3	–	1	–	1	3	–	3	–	1
Colorado College	5	–	2	–	0	6	–	2	–	0
Colorado	4	–	4	–	0	4	–	5	–	0
Utah Agricultural	3	–	3	–	1	3	–	4	–	1
BYU	2	–	4	–	0	2	–	4	–	1
Colorado Mines	2	–	5	–	0	2	–	5	–	0
Wyoming	1	–	4	–	0	4	–	5	–	0
Colorado Teachers	1	–	6	–	0	2	–	7	–	0
Western State (CO)	1	–	5	–	0	1	–	6	–	0
$ – Conference champion

The 1927 Utah Utes football team represented the University of Utah as a member of the Rocky Mountain Conference (RMC) during the 1927 college football season. Led by third-year head coach Ike Armstrong, the Utes compiled an overall record of 3–3–1 with a mark of 3–1–1 in conference play, tying for third place in the RMC. 1927 was the first year Utah played at Ute Stadium—now known as Robert Rice Stadium. Although the name has changed and there have been several renovations, the Utes have played in the same location since 1927. The stadium debuted with a 40–6 defeat of Colorado Mines on October 1, 1927.

== Schedule ==
Date	Opponent	Site	Result	Source
October 1	Colorado Mines	Ute Stadium; Salt Lake City, UT	W 40–6	
October 8	at Northwestern*	Dyche Stadium; Evanston, IL	L 6–13	
October 22	Colorado^{†}	Ute Stadium; Salt Lake City, UT (rivalry)	W 20–13	
October 29	at Colorado Agricultural	Colorado Field; Fort Collins, CO	L 0–12	
November 5	Creighton*	Ute Stadium; Salt Lake City, UT	L 7–16	
November 12	at BYU	Provo, UT (rivalry)	W 20–0	
November 24	Utah Agricultural	Ute Stadium; Salt Lake City, UT (rivalry)	T 0–0	
*Non-conference game; ^{†}Homecoming
