= 1928 BYU Cougars football team =

American college football season

1928 BYU Cougars football
- Conference: Rocky Mountain Conference
- Record: 3–3–1 (1–3–1 RMC)
- Head coach: G. Ott Romney (1st season)

1928 Rocky Mountain Conference football standings
	Conf.					Overall
Team	W		L		T	W		L		T
Utah $	4	–	0	–	1	5	–	0	–	2
Colorado	5	–	1	–	0	5	–	1	–	0
Colorado Agricultural	6	–	2	–	0	6	–	2	–	0
Utah Agricultural	4	–	2	–	1	5	–	3	–	1
Colorado College	5	–	3	–	0	5	–	3	–	0
Montana State	3	–	2	–	0	4	–	4	–	1
Denver	3	–	4	–	1	4	–	4	–	1
Colorado Teachers	3	–	4	–	0	4	–	4	–	0
Colorado Mines	2	–	4	–	0	2	–	5	–	0
BYU	1	–	3	–	1	3	–	3	–	1
Wyoming	0	–	5	–	0	2	–	7	–	0
Western State (CO)	0	–	6	–	0	0	–	7	–	0
$ – Conference champion

The 1928 BYU Cougars football team was an American football team that represented Brigham Young University (BYU) as a member of the Rocky Mountain Conference (RMC) during the Rocky Mountain Conference (RMC) during the 1928 college football season. In their first season under head coach G. Ott Romney, the Cougars compiled an overall record of 3–3–1 with a mark of 1–3–1 against conference opponents, finished tenth in the RMC, and outscored opponents by a total of 75 to 56.

== Schedule ==
Date	Opponent	Site	Result	Attendance	Source
September 29	College of Idaho*	Provo, UT	W 9–6	5,000	
October 6	Cal Aggies*	Provo, UT	W 7–6	3,000	
October 13	at Colorado Agricultural	Colorado Field; Fort Collins, CO	L 6–15		
October 20	at Western State (CO)	Gunnison, CO	W 46–0		
October 27	Utah Agricultural	Provo, UT (rivalry)	L 0–10	5,000	
November 3	at Montana State	Gatton Field; Bozeman, MT	L 7–19		
November 17	at Utah	Ute Stadium; Salt Lake City, UT (rivalry)	T 0–0		
*Non-conference game
