= 1926 Montana State Bobcats football team =

American college football season

1926 Montana State Bobcats football
- Conference: Rocky Mountain Conference
- Record: 4–2–1 (4–0 RMC)
- Head coach: G. Ott Romney (5th season)
- Home stadium: Gatton Field

1926 Rocky Mountain Conference football standings
	Conf.					Overall
Team	W		L		T	W		L		T
Utah $	5	–	0	–	0	7	–	0	–	0
Montana State	4	–	0	–	0	4	–	2	–	1
Colorado College	5	–	2	–	0	5	–	2	–	0
Colorado Agricultural	5	–	2	–	0	6	–	2	–	1
Utah Agricultural	4	–	1	–	2	5	–	1	–	2
Colorado Teachers	3	–	3	–	0	6	–	4	–	0
Denver	4	–	4	–	0	4	–	4	–	0
Wyoming	1	–	2	–	2	2	–	4	–	2
Colorado	2	–	5	–	1	3	–	5	–	1
BYU	1	–	4	–	1	1	–	5	–	1
Colorado Mines	1	–	5	–	0	1	–	6	–	0
Western State (CO)	0	–	7	–	0	0	–	8	–	0
$ – Conference champion

The 1926 Montana State Bobcats football team represented Montana State College (later renamed Montana State University) in the Rocky Mountain Conference (RMC) during the 1926 college football season. In its fifth season under head coach G. Ott Romney, the team compiled a 4–2–1 record (4–0 against RMC opponents), finished second in the conference, and outscored opponents by a total of 52 to 43.

== Schedule ==
Date	Opponent	Site	Result	Attendance	Source
October 2	at Idaho*	MacLean Field; Moscow, ID	T 0–0		
October 9	at Colorado	Colorado Stadium; Boulder, CO	W 6–3		
October 23	vs. Montana*	Clark Park; Butte, MT (rivalry)	L 0–27		
October 30	Colorado Teachers	Gatton Field; Bozeman, MT	W 9–6		
November 6	BYU^{†}	Gatton Field; Bozeman, MT	W 27–0		
November 13	vs. Wyoming	Natrona County H.S. Athletic Field; Casper, WY	W 10–0	3,500	
November 25	at College of Idaho*	Public School Field; Boise, ID	L 0–7		
*Non-conference game; ^{†}Homecoming
