= 1927 Colorado Agricultural Aggies football team =

American college football season

1927 Colorado Agricultural Aggies football

RMC champion
- Conference: Rocky Mountain Conference
- Record: 7–1 (7–1 RMC)
- Head coach: Harry W. Hughes (17th season)
- Home stadium: Colorado Field

1927 Rocky Mountain Conference football standings
	Conf.					Overall
Team	W		L		T	W		L		T
Colorado Agricultural $	7	–	1	–	0	7	–	1	–	0
Denver	5	–	1	–	0	5	–	2	–	0
Montana State	3	–	1	–	0	4	–	4	–	0
Utah	3	–	1	–	1	3	–	3	–	1
Colorado College	5	–	2	–	0	6	–	2	–	0
Colorado	4	–	4	–	0	4	–	5	–	0
Utah Agricultural	3	–	3	–	1	3	–	4	–	1
BYU	2	–	4	–	0	2	–	4	–	1
Colorado Mines	2	–	5	–	0	2	–	5	–	0
Wyoming	1	–	4	–	0	4	–	5	–	0
Western State (CO)	1	–	5	–	0	1	–	6	–	0
Colorado Teachers	1	–	6	–	0	2	–	7	–	0
$ – Conference champion

The 1927 Colorado Agricultural Aggies football team represented Colorado Agricultural College (now known as Colorado State University) in the Rocky Mountain Conference (RMC) during the 1927 college football season. In their 17th season under head coach Harry W. Hughes, the Aggies compiled a 7–1 record, won the RMC championship, and outscored all opponents by a total of 176 to 26.

Six Colorado Agricultural players received all-conference honors in 1927: fullback Rollie Caldwell, guard Lynn Pitcher, end Glen Davis, halfback Fay Rankin, center Carlyle Vickers, and guard Ed Graves.

== Schedule ==
Date	Opponent	Site	Result	Source
October 1	at Colorado Teachers	Jackson Field; Greeley, CO	W 33–0	
October 8	BYU	Colorado Field; Fort Collins, CO	W 29–0	
October 15	at Denver	Denver University Stadium; Denver, CO	L 0–6	
October 29	Utah	Colorado Field; Fort Collins, CO	W 12–0	
November 5	at Utah Agricultural	Aggie Stadium; Logan, UT	W 6–0	
November 12	at Colorado Mines	Brooks Field; Golden, CO	W 37–6	
November 19	Colorado	Colorado Field; Fort Collins, CO (rivalry)	W 39–7	
November 26	at Colorado College	Washburn Field; Colorado Springs, CO	W 20–7	
