= 1925 Utah Utes football team =

American college football season

1925 Utah Utes football
- Conference: Rocky Mountain Conference
- Record: 6–2 (5–1 RMC)
- Head coach: Ike Armstrong (1st season)
- Home stadium: Cummings Field

1925 Rocky Mountain Conference football standings
	Conf.					Overall
Team	W		L		T	W		L		T
Colorado Agricultural $	8	–	0	–	0	9	–	1	–	0
Utah Agricultural	5	–	1	–	0	6	–	1	–	0
Utah	5	–	1	–	0	6	–	2	–	0
Colorado	5	–	2	–	0	6	–	3	–	0
Wyoming	4	–	3	–	0	6	–	3	–	0
BYU	3	–	3	–	0	3	–	3	–	0
Colorado College	4	–	4	–	0	5	–	4	–	1
Western State (CO)	2	–	4	–	0	3	–	4	–	0
Colorado Mines	2	–	6	–	0	2	–	7	–	0
Montana State	1	–	4	–	0	6	–	5	–	0
Denver	1	–	6	–	0	1	–	6	–	0
Colorado Teachers	0	–	6	–	0	2	–	6	–	1
$ – Conference champion

The 1925 Utah Utes football team was an American football team that represented the University of Utah as a member of the Rocky Mountain Conference (RMC) during the 1925 college football season. In its first season under head coach Ike Armstrong, the team compiled an overall record of 6–2 record with a mark of 5–1 against conference opponents, tying for second place in the RMC.

== Schedule ==
Date	Opponent	Site	Result	Attendance	Source
October 10	at USC*	Los Angeles Memorial Coliseum; Los Angeles, CA	L 2–28†	18,000	
October 17	at Arizona*	Tucson, AZ	W 9–0		
October 24	Colorado^{†}	Cummings Field; Salt Lake City, UT (rivalry)	W 12–7		
October 31	at BYU	Provo, UT (rivalry)	W 27–0		
November 7	Denver	Cummings Field; Salt Lake City, UT	W 27–0		
November 14	at Colorado College	Washburn Field; Colorado Springs, CO	W 20–0		
November 18	at Wyoming	Campus athletic grounds; Laramie, WY	W 7–6		
November 26	Utah Agricultural	Cummings Field; Salt Lake City, UT (rivalry)	L 6–10		
*Non-conference game; ^{†}Homecoming
