= 1927 South Dakota Coyotes football team =

American college football season

1927 South Dakota Coyotes football

NCC co-champion
- Conference: North Central Conference
- Record: 7–2 (5–0 NCC)
- Head coach: Vincent E. Montgomery (1st season)

1927 North Central Conference football standings
	Conf.					Overall
Team	W		L		T	W		L		T
South Dakota +	5	–	0	–	0	7	–	2	–	0
Creighton +	2	–	0	–	0	6	–	1	–	1
South Dakota State	2	–	2	–	0	5	–	3	–	0
North Dakota	2	–	2	–	0	4	–	4	–	0
Morningside	1	–	3	–	0	3	–	5	–	0
North Dakota Agricultural	1	–	3	–	0	3	–	5	–	0
Nebraska Wesleyan	0	–	3	–	0	0	–	8	–	1
+ – Conference co-champions

The 1927 South Dakota Coyotes football team was an American football team that represented the University of South Dakota as a member of the North Central Conference (NCC) during the 1927 college football season. In their first season under head coach Vincent E. Montgomery, the Coyotes compiled a 7–2 record (5–0 against NCC opponents), tied for the NCC championship, and outscored opponents by a total of 143 to 105.

== Schedule ==
Date	Opponent	Site	Result	Attendance	Source
September 24	Huron*	Vermillion, SD	W 32–0		
October 1	at Northwestern*	Dyche Stadium; Evanston, IL	L 2–47	25,000	
October 8	at Tulsa*	McNulty Park; Tulsa, OK	L 12–33	3,000	
October 15	at North Dakota	Grand Forks, ND (rivalry)	W 6–0		
October 22	at Nebraska Wesleyan	Lincoln, NE	W 26–0		
October 29	South Dakota State	Vermillion, SD (rivalry, Dakota Day)	W 16–12	6,000	
November 4	at Western Union*	Le Mars, IA	W 14–6		
November 11	North Dakota Agricultural	Vermillion, SD	W 13–0		
November 24	at Morningside	Bass Field; Sioux City, IA	W 22–7	6,000	
*Non-conference game
