= 1925 Colorado Agricultural Aggies football team =

American college football season

1925 Colorado Agricultural Aggies football

RMC champion
- Conference: Rocky Mountain Conference
- Record: 9–1 (8–0 RMC)
- Head coach: Harry W. Hughes (15th season)
- Home stadium: Colorado Field

1925 Rocky Mountain Conference football standings
	Conf.					Overall
Team	W		L		T	W		L		T
Colorado Agricultural $	8	–	0	–	0	9	–	1	–	0
Utah Agricultural	5	–	1	–	0	6	–	1	–	0
Utah	5	–	1	–	0	6	–	2	–	0
Colorado	5	–	2	–	0	6	–	3	–	0
Wyoming	4	–	3	–	0	6	–	3	–	0
BYU	3	–	3	–	0	3	–	3	–	0
Colorado College	4	–	4	–	0	5	–	4	–	1
Western State (CO)	2	–	4	–	0	3	–	4	–	0
Colorado Mines	2	–	6	–	0	2	–	7	–	0
Montana State	1	–	4	–	0	6	–	5	–	0
Denver	1	–	6	–	0	1	–	6	–	0
Colorado Teachers	0	–	6	–	0	2	–	6	–	1
$ – Conference champion

The 1925 Colorado Agricultural Aggies football team was an American football team that represented Colorado Agricultural College (now known as Colorado State University) in the Rocky Mountain Conference (RMC) during the 1925 college football season. In its 15th season under head coach Harry W. Hughes, the team compiled a 9–1 record (8–0 against RMC opponents), won the RMC championship, and outscored all opponents by a total of 228 to 79.

Five Colorado Agricultural players received all-conference honors in 1925: quarterback Kenny Hyde, tackle Julius (Hans) Wagner, guard Glen Clark, fullback Fay Rankin, and guard Otto Kayser. In addition, Kenny Hyde received third-team recognition from the Associated Press on the 1925 College Football All-America Team.

== Schedule ==
Date	Opponent	Site	Result	Attendance	Source
October 3	Regis*	Colorado Field; Fort Collins, CO	W 34–0		
October 10	BYU	Colorado Field; Fort Collins, CO	W 21–7		
October 17	at Denver	Denver University Stadium; Denver, CO	W 16–0		
October 24	at Colorado College	Colorado Springs, CO	W 7–3		
October 31	vs. Utah Agricultural	Ogden, UT	W 13–0	7,000	
November 7	Colorado Teachers	Colorado Field; Fort Collins, CO	W 43–18		
November 14	Colorado	Colorado Field; Fort Collins, CO (rivalry)	W 12–0		
November 21	at Colorado Mines	Golden, CO	W 41–10		
November 26	Wyoming	Colorado Field; Fort Collins, CO (rivalry)	W 40–0		
December 12	at Hawaii*	Moiliili Field; Honolulu, Territory of Hawaii	L 0–41		
*Non-conference game
