= 1926 BYU Cougars football team =

American college football season

1926 BYU Cougars football
- Conference: Rocky Mountain Conference
- Record: 1–5–1 (1–4–1 RMC)
- Head coach: Charles J. Hart (2nd season)

1926 Rocky Mountain Conference football standings
| | Conf. | | | | | Overall |
| Team | W | | L | | T | W | | L | | T |
|---|---|---|---|---|---|---|---|---|---|---|
| Utah $ | 5 | – | 0 | – | 0 | 7 | – | 0 | – | 0 |
| Montana State | 4 | – | 0 | – | 0 | 4 | – | 2 | – | 1 |
| Colorado College | 5 | – | 2 | – | 0 | 5 | – | 2 | – | 0 |
| Colorado Agricultural | 5 | – | 2 | – | 0 | 6 | – | 2 | – | 1 |
| Utah Agricultural | 4 | – | 1 | – | 2 | 5 | – | 1 | – | 2 |
| Colorado Teachers | 3 | – | 3 | – | 0 | 6 | – | 4 | – | 0 |
| Denver | 4 | – | 4 | – | 0 | 4 | – | 4 | – | 0 |
| Wyoming | 1 | – | 2 | – | 2 | 2 | – | 4 | – | 2 |
| Colorado | 2 | – | 5 | – | 1 | 3 | – | 5 | – | 1 |
| BYU | 1 | – | 4 | – | 1 | 1 | – | 5 | – | 1 |
| Colorado Mines | 1 | – | 5 | – | 0 | 1 | – | 6 | – | 0 |
| Western State (CO) | 0 | – | 7 | – | 0 | 0 | – | 8 | – | 0 |
$ – Conference champion

The 1926 BYU Cougars football team was an American football team that represented Brigham Young University (BYU) as a member of the Rocky Mountain Conference (RMC) during the 1926 college football season. In their second season under head coach Charles J. Hart, the Cougars compiled an overall record of 1–5–1 with a mark of 1–4–1 in conference play, finished tenth in the RMC, and were outscored by a total of 115 to 49.

== Schedule ==
| Date | Opponent | Site | Result | Source |
|---|---|---|---|---|
| October 2 | Cal Aggies* | Provo, UT | L 0–17 | |
| October 9 | at Colorado Teachers | Jackson Field; Greeley, CO | L 6–12 | |
| October 15 | Utah Agricultural^{†} | Provo, UT (rivalry) | T 0–0 | |
| October 23 | at Western State (CO) | Gunnison, CO | W 29–0 | |
| November 6 | at Montana State | Gatton Field; Bozeman, MT | L 0–27 | |
| November 13 | at Utah | Cummings Field; Salt Lake City, UT (rivalry) | L 7–40 | |
| November 20 | Colorado Agricultural | Provo, UT | L 6–19 | |
*Non-conference game; ^{†}Homecoming
