= 1926 Wyoming Cowboys football team =

American college football season

1926 Wyoming Cowboys football
- Conference: Rocky Mountain Conference
- Record: 2–4–2 (1–2–2 RMC)
- Head coach: William Henry Dietz (3rd season)
- Captain: None
- Home stadium: Campus athletic grounds

1926 Rocky Mountain Conference football standings
	Conf.					Overall
Team	W		L		T	W		L		T
Utah $	5	–	0	–	0	7	–	0	–	0
Montana State *	4	–	0	–	0	4	–	2	–	1
Colorado College	5	–	2	–	0	5	–	2	–	0
Colorado Agricultural	5	–	2	–	0	6	–	2	–	1
Utah Agricultural	4	–	1	–	2	5	–	1	–	2
Colorado Teachers	3	–	3	–	0	6	–	4	–	0
Denver	4	–	4	–	0	4	–	4	–	0
Wyoming	1	–	2	–	2	2	–	4	–	2
Colorado	2	–	5	–	1	3	–	5	–	1
BYU	1	–	4	–	1	1	–	5	–	1
Colorado Mines	1	–	5	–	0	1	–	6	–	0
Western State (CO)	0	–	7	–	0	0	–	8	–	0
$ – Conference champion; * – Ineligible for conference title; played less than five conference games

The 1926 Wyoming Cowboys football team was an American football team that represented the University of Wyoming as a member of the Rocky Mountain Conference (RMC) during the 1926 college football season. In their third and final season under head coach William Henry Dietz, the Cowboys compiled a 2–4–2 record (1–2–2 against conference opponents), finished eighth in the RMC, and outscored opponents by a total of 152 to 91.

== Schedule ==
Date	Opponent	Site	Result	Source
October 6	Nebraska Wesleyan*	Campus athletic grounds; Laramie, WY	L 7–14	
October 9	Kearney Normal*	Campus athletic grounds; Laramie, WY	W 48–0	
October 16	at Colorado	Colorado Stadium; Boulder, CO	T 13–13	
October 23	Utah Agricultural	Campus athletic grounds; Laramie, WY (rivalry)	T 6–6	
November 6	at Colorado College	Washburn Field; Colorado Springs, CO	L 0–25	
November 13	vs. Montana State	Natrona County H.S. Athletic Field; Casper, WY	L 0–10	
November 20	at Regis*	Denver, CO	L 7–22	
November 25	Western State (CO)	Campus athletic grounds; Laramie, WY	W 71–0	
*Non-conference game
