= 1921 Colorado Silver and Gold football team =

American college football season

1921 Colorado Silver and Gold football
- Conference: Rocky Mountain Conference
- Record: 4–1–1 (4–0–1 RMC)
- Head coach: Myron E. Witham (2nd season)
- Captain: Carl Fulghum
- Home stadium: Gamble Field

1921 Rocky Mountain Conference football standings
	Conf.					Overall
Team	W		L		T	W		L		T
Utah Agricultural $	4	–	0	–	0	7	–	1	–	0
Colorado	4	–	0	–	1	4	–	1	–	1
Utah	2	–	1	–	1	3	–	2	–	1
Denver	2	–	2	–	1	4	–	2	–	1
Colorado Agricultural	2	–	2	–	1	2	–	3	–	1
Colorado College	2	–	4	–	0	4	–	4	–	0
Wyoming	1	–	3	–	2	1	–	4	–	2
Colorado Mines	1	–	5	–	0	1	–	5	–	0
Montana State	0	–	1	–	0	2	–	4	–	0
$ – Conference champion

The 1921 Colorado Silver and Gold football team was an American football team that represented the University of Colorado as a member of the Rocky Mountain Conference (RMC) during the 1921 college football season. In its second season under head coach Myron E. Witham, the team compiled a 4–1–1 record (4–0–1 against RMC opponents), finished second in the conference, and outscored opponents by a total of 65 to 63.

== Schedule ==
Date	Opponent	Site	Result	Attendance	Source
October 22	Denver	Gamble Field; Boulder, CO	W 10–7		
October 29	at Chicago*	Stagg Field; Chicago, IL	L 0–35		
November 5	Colorado College^{†}	Gamble Field; Boulder, CO	W 35–14		
November 12	at Utah	Cummings Field; Salt Lake City, UT	T 0–0		
November 19	at Colorado Agricultural	Colorado Field; Fort Collins, CO (rivalry)	W 10–0		
November 24	Colorado Mines	Denver, CO	W 10–7	10,000	
*Non-conference game; ^{†}Homecoming
