= 1925 Wyoming Cowboys football team =

American college football season

1925 Wyoming Cowboys football
- Conference: Rocky Mountain Conference
- Record: 6–3 (4–3 RMC)
- Head coach: William Henry Dietz (2nd season)
- Captain: None
- Home stadium: Campus athletic grounds

1925 Rocky Mountain Conference football standings
	Conf.					Overall
Team	W		L		T	W		L		T
Colorado Agricultural $	8	–	0	–	0	9	–	1	–	0
Utah Agricultural	5	–	1	–	0	6	–	1	–	0
Utah	5	–	1	–	0	6	–	2	–	0
Colorado	5	–	2	–	0	6	–	3	–	0
Wyoming	4	–	3	–	0	6	–	3	–	0
BYU	3	–	3	–	0	3	–	3	–	0
Colorado College	4	–	4	–	0	5	–	4	–	1
Western State (CO)	2	–	4	–	0	3	–	4	–	0
Colorado Mines	2	–	6	–	0	2	–	7	–	0
Montana State	1	–	4	–	0	6	–	5	–	0
Denver	1	–	6	–	0	1	–	6	–	0
Colorado Teachers	0	–	6	–	0	2	–	6	–	1
$ – Conference champion

The 1925 Wyoming Cowboys football team was an American football team that represented the University of Wyoming as a member of the Rocky Mountain Conference (RMC) during the 1925 college football season. In their second season under head coach William Henry Dietz, the Cowboys compiled a 6–3 record (4–3 against conference opponents), finished fifth in the RMC, and outscored opponents by a total of 147 to 83. They won their first five games before losing three of their last four games, including rivalry games with Utah Agricultural and Colorado Agricultural.

The 1925 team had the only winning record for Wyoming football between 1911 and 1931.

== Schedule ==
Date	Opponent	Site	Result	Attendance	Source
October 3	Kearney Normal*	Campus athletic grounds; Laramie, WY	W 34–0		
October 10	at Western State (CO)	Gunnison, CO	W 7–0		
October 17	Colorado Mines^{†}	Campus athletic grounds; Laramie, WY	W 43–0	> 1,500	
October 24	Regis*	Campus athletic grounds; Laramie, WY	W 24–0		
October 30	at Montana State	Bozeman, MT	W 7–0		
November 5	at Utah Agricultural	Adams Field; Logan, UT (rivalry)	L 13–26		
November 11	vs. Colorado Teachers	Cheyenne, WY	W 13–10		
November 18	Utah	Campus athletic grounds; Laramie, WY	L 6–7		
November 26	at Colorado Agricultural	Colorado Field; Fort Collins, CO (rivalry)	L 0–40		
*Non-conference game; ^{†}Homecoming
