= 1925 Montana State Bobcats football team =

American college football season

1925 Montana State Bobcats football
- Conference: Rocky Mountain Conference
- Record: 6–5 (1–4 RMC)
- Head coach: G. Ott Romney (4th season)
- Captain: Vander Dobeus
- Home stadium: Gatton Field

1925 Rocky Mountain Conference football standings
| | Conf. | | | | | Overall |
| Team | W | | L | | T | W | | L | | T |
|---|---|---|---|---|---|---|---|---|---|---|
| Colorado Agricultural $ | 8 | – | 0 | – | 0 | 9 | – | 1 | – | 0 |
| Utah Agricultural | 5 | – | 1 | – | 0 | 6 | – | 1 | – | 0 |
| Utah | 5 | – | 1 | – | 0 | 6 | – | 2 | – | 0 |
| Colorado | 5 | – | 2 | – | 0 | 6 | – | 3 | – | 0 |
| Wyoming | 4 | – | 3 | – | 0 | 6 | – | 3 | – | 0 |
| BYU | 3 | – | 3 | – | 0 | 3 | – | 3 | – | 0 |
| Colorado College | 4 | – | 4 | – | 0 | 5 | – | 4 | – | 1 |
| Western State (CO) | 2 | – | 4 | – | 0 | 3 | – | 4 | – | 0 |
| Colorado Mines | 2 | – | 6 | – | 0 | 2 | – | 7 | – | 0 |
| Montana State | 1 | – | 4 | – | 0 | 6 | – | 5 | – | 0 |
| Denver | 1 | – | 6 | – | 0 | 1 | – | 6 | – | 0 |
| Colorado Teachers | 0 | – | 6 | – | 0 | 2 | – | 6 | – | 1 |
$ – Conference champion

The 1925 Montana State Bobcats football team represented Montana State College (later renamed Montana State University) in the Rocky Mountain Conference (RMC) during the 1925 college football season. In its fourth season under head coach G. Ott Romney, the team compiled a 6–5 record (1–4 against RMC opponents) and outscored opponents by a total of 291 to 84.

Vander Dobeus, from Lewistown, Montana, was the team captain.

== Schedule ==
| Date | Opponent | Site | Result | Attendance | Source |
|---|---|---|---|---|---|
| September 26 | Centerville (Butte)* | Gatton Field; Bozeman, MT | W 21–0 | | |
| September 26 | Englewood (Butte)* | Gatton Field; Bozeman, MT | W 86–0 | | |
| October 3 | at Colorado | Colorado Stadium; Boulder, CO | L 3–23 | | |
| October 10 | Montana Mines* | Gatton Field; Bozeman, MT | W 72–0 | | |
| October 17 | Mount St. Charles* | Gatton Field; Bozeman, MT | W 30–0 | | |
| October 24 | Intermountain Union* | Gatton Field; Bozeman, MT | W 33–0 | | |
| October 30 | Wyoming^{†} | Gatton Field; Bozeman, MT | L 0–7 | | |
| November 7 | vs. Colorado Mines* | Denver, CO | W 25–0 | | |
| November 11 | at Utah Agricultural | Adams Field; Logan, UT | L 7–10 | 5,500 | |
| November 21 | at BYU* | University Field; Provo, UT | L 7–17 | | |
| November 27 | at Montana* | Dornblaser Field; Missoula, MT (rivalry) | L 7–28 | | |
*Non-conference game; ^{†}Homecoming
