= 1921 Colorado Agricultural Aggies football team =

American college football season

1921 Colorado Agricultural Aggies football
- Conference: Rocky Mountain Conference
- Record: 2–3–1 (2–2–1 RMC)
- Head coach: Harry W. Hughes (11th season)
- Home stadium: Colorado Field

1921 Rocky Mountain Conference football standings
	Conf.					Overall
Team	W		L		T	W		L		T
Utah Agricultural $	4	–	0	–	0	7	–	1	–	0
Colorado	4	–	0	–	1	4	–	1	–	1
Utah	2	–	1	–	1	3	–	2	–	1
Denver	2	–	2	–	1	4	–	2	–	1
Colorado Agricultural	2	–	2	–	1	2	–	3	–	1
Colorado College	2	–	4	–	0	4	–	4	–	0
Wyoming	1	–	3	–	2	1	–	4	–	2
Colorado Mines	1	–	5	–	0	1	–	5	–	0
Montana State	0	–	1	–	0	2	–	4	–	0
$ – Conference champion

The 1921 Colorado Agricultural Aggies football team represented Colorado Agricultural College (now known as Colorado State University) in the Rocky Mountain Conference (RMC) during the 1921 college football season. In their 11th season under head coach Harry W. Hughes, the Aggies compiled a 2–3–1 record (2–2–1 against conference opponents), tied for fourth place in the RMC, and outscored all opponents by a total of 108 to 66.

== Schedule ==
Date	Opponent	Site	Result	Source
October 1	Wyoming	Colorado Field; Fort Collins, CO (rivalry)	T 7–7	
October 15	Colorado Mines	Colorado Field; Fort Collins, CO	W 24–0	
October 29	at Colorado College	Colorado Springs, CO	W 24–0	
November 5	Denver	Colorado Field; Fort Collins, CO	L 14–21	
November 19	Colorado	Colorado Field; Fort Collins, CO (rivalry)	L 0–10	
November 24	at Nebraska*	Nebraska Field; Lincoln, NE	L 7–70	
*Non-conference game
