= 1921 Utah Agricultural Aggies football team =

American college football season

1921 Utah Agricultural Aggies football

RMC champion
- Conference: Rocky Mountain Conference
- Record: 7–1 (4–0 RMC)
- Head coach: Dick Romney (3rd season)
- Home stadium: Adams Field

1921 Rocky Mountain Conference football standings
| | Conf. | | | | | Overall |
| Team | W | | L | | T | W | | L | | T |
|---|---|---|---|---|---|---|---|---|---|---|
| Utah Agricultural $ | 4 | – | 0 | – | 0 | 7 | – | 1 | – | 0 |
| Colorado | 4 | – | 0 | – | 1 | 4 | – | 1 | – | 1 |
| Utah | 2 | – | 1 | – | 1 | 3 | – | 2 | – | 1 |
| Denver | 2 | – | 2 | – | 1 | 4 | – | 2 | – | 1 |
| Colorado Agricultural | 2 | – | 2 | – | 1 | 2 | – | 3 | – | 1 |
| Colorado College | 2 | – | 4 | – | 0 | 4 | – | 4 | – | 0 |
| Wyoming | 1 | – | 3 | – | 2 | 1 | – | 4 | – | 2 |
| Colorado Mines | 1 | – | 5 | – | 0 | 1 | – | 5 | – | 0 |
| Montana State | 0 | – | 1 | – | 0 | 2 | – | 4 | – | 0 |
$ – Conference champion

The 1921 Utah Agricultural Aggies football team was an American football team that represented Utah Agricultural College (later renamed Utah State University) in the Rocky Mountain Conference (RMC) during the 1921 college football season. In their third season under head coach Dick Romney, the Aggies compiled a 7–1 record (4–0 against RMC opponents), won RMC championship, and outscored all opponents by a total of 151 to 82.

== Schedule ==
| Date | Time | Opponent | Site | Result | Attendance | Source |
|---|---|---|---|---|---|---|
| October 1 | | Ogden Athletic Association* | Adams Field; Logan, UT | W 47–21 | | |
| October 11 | | Wyoming | Adams Field; Logan, UT (rivalry) | W 14–3 | | |
| October 15 | | Montana State* | Adams Field; Logan, UT | W 30–7 | | |
| October 22 | | Nevada* | Adams Field; Logan, UT | L 0–41 | | |
| October 29 | 2:30 p.m. | at Montana Mines* | Clark park; Butte, MT | W 3–0 | | |
| November 5 | 2:30 p.m. | vs. Colorado Mines | Fair grounds; Pueblo, CO | W 23–7 | 3,000 | |
| November 11 | | College of Idaho* | Adams Field; Logan, UT | W 20–0 | | |
| November 24 | | at Utah | Cummings Field; Salt Lake City, UT (rivalry) | W 14–3 | 10,000 | |
*Non-conference game; All times are in Mountain time
