= 1927 North Dakota Flickertails football team =

American college football season

1927 North Dakota Flickertails football
- Conference: North Central Conference
- Record: 4–4 (1–2 NCC)
- Head coach: Tod Rockwell (2nd season)

1927 North Central Conference football standings
	Conf.					Overall
Team	W		L		T	W		L		T
South Dakota +	5	–	0	–	0	7	–	2	–	0
Creighton +	2	–	0	–	0	6	–	1	–	1
South Dakota State	2	–	2	–	0	5	–	3	–	0
North Dakota	2	–	2	–	0	4	–	4	–	0
Morningside	1	–	3	–	0	3	–	5	–	0
North Dakota Agricultural	1	–	3	–	0	3	–	5	–	0
Nebraska Wesleyan	0	–	3	–	0	0	–	8	–	1
+ – Conference co-champions

The 1927 North Dakota Flickertails football team, also known as the Nodaks, was an American football team that represented the University of North Dakota in the North Central Conference (NCC) during the 1927 college football season. In its second year under head coach Tod Rockwell, the team compiled a 4–4 record (1–2 against NCC opponents), finished in a tie for seventh place out of nine teams in the NCC, and was outscored by a total of 103 to 88.

== Schedule ==
Date	Opponent	Site	Result	Attendance	Source
September 24	at Manitoba*	Wesley Park; Winnipeg, Manitoba, Canada	W 33–0	2,000	
September 27	Valley City Teachers*	Memorial Stadium; Grand Forks, ND	W 19–0		
October 1	at Minnesota*	Memorial Stadium; Minneapolis, MN	L 10–57	22,000	
October 8	Creighton^{†}	Memorial Stadium; Grand Forks, ND	L 0–7		
October 15	South Dakota	Memorial Stadium; Grand Forks, ND (rivalry)	L 0–6		
October 22	St. Thomas (MN)*	Memorial Stadium; Grand Forks, ND	W 13–6		
October 29	North Dakota State	Memorial Stadium; Grand Forks, ND (rivalry)	W 13–0		
November 5	at Carleton*	Carleton Stadium; Northfield, MN	L 0–27	> 7,000	
*Non-conference game; ^{†}Homecoming
