= 1921 Montana State Bobcats football team =

American college football season

1921 Montana State Bobcats football
- Conference: Rocky Mountain Conference
- Record: 2–4 (0–1 RMC)
- Head coach: D. V. Graves (2nd season)
- Home stadium: Gatton Field

1921 Rocky Mountain Conference football standings
	Conf.					Overall
Team	W		L		T	W		L		T
Utah Agricultural $	4	–	0	–	0	7	–	1	–	0
Colorado	4	–	0	–	1	4	–	1	–	1
Utah	2	–	1	–	1	3	–	2	–	1
Denver	2	–	2	–	1	4	–	2	–	1
Colorado Agricultural	2	–	2	–	1	2	–	3	–	1
Colorado College	2	–	4	–	0	4	–	4	–	0
Wyoming	1	–	3	–	2	1	–	4	–	2
Colorado Mines	1	–	5	–	0	1	–	5	–	0
Montana State	0	–	1	–	0	2	–	4	–	0
$ – Conference champion

The 1921 Montana State Bobcats football team was an American football team that represented Montana State College (later renamed Montana State University) in the Rocky Mountain Conference (RMC) during the 1921 college football season. In their second season under head coach D. V. Graves, the Bobcats compiled a 2–4 record (0–1 against RMC opponents), finished in last place out of nine games in the RMC, and were outscored by a total of 74 to 63.

== Schedule ==
Date	Opponent	Site	Result	Attendance	Source
October 8	Mount St. Charles*	Gatton Field; Bozeman, MT	W 21–7		
October 15	at Utah Agricultural	Adams Field; Logan, UT	L 7–30		
October 22	Montana Mines*	Gatton Field; Bozeman, MT	W 26–0		
October 29	at Gonzaga*	Spokane, WA	L 2–7	3,000	
November 5	at Montana Wesleyan*	Helena, MT	L 0–16		
November 11	Montana*	Gatton Field; Bozeman, MT (rivalry)	L 7–14		
*Non-conference game
