= 1927 Utah Agricultural Aggies football team =

American college football season

1927 Utah Agricultural Aggies football
- Conference: Rocky Mountain Conference
- Record: 3–4–1 (3–3–1 RMC)
- Head coach: Dick Romney (9th season)
- Home stadium: Aggie Stadium

1927 Rocky Mountain Conference football standings
	Conf.					Overall
Team	W		L		T	W		L		T
Colorado Agricultural $	7	–	1	–	0	7	–	1	–	0
Denver	5	–	1	–	0	5	–	2	–	0
Montana State	3	–	1	–	0	4	–	4	–	0
Utah	3	–	1	–	1	3	–	3	–	1
Colorado College	5	–	2	–	0	6	–	2	–	0
Colorado	4	–	4	–	0	4	–	5	–	0
Utah Agricultural	3	–	3	–	1	3	–	4	–	1
BYU	2	–	4	–	0	2	–	4	–	1
Colorado Mines	2	–	5	–	0	2	–	5	–	0
Wyoming	1	–	4	–	0	4	–	5	–	0
Colorado Teachers	1	–	6	–	0	2	–	7	–	0
Western State (CO)	1	–	5	–	0	1	–	6	–	0
$ – Conference champion

The 1927 Utah Agricultural Aggies football team was an American football team that represented Utah Agricultural College in the Rocky Mountain Conference (RMC) during the 1927 college football season. In their ninth season under head coach Dick Romney, the Aggies compiled a 3–4–1 record (3–3–1 against RMC opponents), finished fourth in the conference, and outscored opponents by a total of 129 to 53.

== Schedule ==
Date	Opponent	Site	Result	Attendance	Source
October 8	Western State (CO)	Aggie Stadium; Logan, UT	W 39–0		
October 15	vs. Montana State	Lorin Farr Park; Ogden, UT	L 6–13		
October 22	Wyoming	Aggie Stadium; Logan, UT (rivalry)	W 42–0		
October 29	BYU	Aggie Stadium; Logan, UT (rivalry)	W 22–0		
November 5	Colorado Agricultural	Aggie Stadium; Logan, UT	L 0–6		
November 11	at Denver	Denver University Stadium; Denver, CO	L 0–13	10,000	
November 24	at Utah	Ute Stadium; Salt Lake City, UT (rivalry)	T 0–0		
December 17	at Hawaii*	Honolulu Stadium; Honolulu, Territory of Hawaii	L 20–21		
*Non-conference game
