= 1928 Wyoming Cowboys football team =

American college football season

1928 Wyoming Cowboys football
- Conference: Rocky Mountain Conference
- Record: 2–7 (0–5 RMC)
- Head coach: George McLaren (2nd season)
- Captain: None
- Home stadium: Campus athletic grounds

1928 Rocky Mountain Conference football standings
	Conf.					Overall
Team	W		L		T	W		L		T
Utah $	4	–	0	–	1	5	–	0	–	2
Colorado	5	–	1	–	0	5	–	1	–	0
Colorado Agricultural	6	–	2	–	0	6	–	2	–	0
Utah Agricultural	4	–	2	–	1	5	–	3	–	1
Colorado College	5	–	3	–	0	5	–	3	–	0
Montana State	3	–	2	–	0	4	–	4	–	1
Denver	3	–	4	–	1	4	–	4	–	1
Colorado Teachers	3	–	4	–	0	4	–	4	–	0
Colorado Mines	2	–	4	–	0	2	–	5	–	0
BYU	1	–	3	–	1	3	–	3	–	1
Wyoming	0	–	5	–	0	2	–	7	–	0
Western State (CO)	0	–	6	–	0	0	–	7	–	0
$ – Conference champion

The 1928 Wyoming Cowboys football team was an American football team that represented the University of Wyoming as a member of the Rocky Mountain Conference (RMC) during the 1928 college football season. In their second season under head coach George McLaren, the Cowboys compiled a 2–7 record (0–5 against conference opponents), finished in 11th place in the RMC, and were outscored by a total of 224 to 106.

== Schedule ==
Date	Time	Opponent	Site	Result	Attendance	Source
September 22		Spearfish*	Campus athletic grounds; Laramie, WY	W 42–0		
September 29		Kearney State*	Campus athletic grounds; Laramie, WY	W 19–6		
October 6	1:00 p.m.	at Chicago*	Stagg Field; Chicago, IL	L 0–47	30,000	
October 19		vs. Utah Agricultural	Lorin Farr Park; Ogden, UT (rivalry)	L 6–24		
October 27		Colorado Teachers	Campus athletic grounds; Laramie, WY	L 0–28		
November 3		at Denver	Denver University Stadium; Denver, CO	L 7–26		
November 10		vs. Montana State	Midland Empire Fairgrounds; Billings, MT	L 7–14	5,000	
November 17		at Chadron Normal*	Chadron, NE	L 0–31		
November 24		at Colorado College	Washburn Field; Colorado Springs, CO	L 25–48		
*Non-conference game; All times are in Mountain time
