= Denver Pioneers football, 1920–1929 =

American college football season

1920–1929 Denver Pioneers football
- Conference: Rocky Mountain Conference
- Head coach: Fred J. Murphy (1920–1922), Elmer McDevitt (1923–1924), Fred Dawson (1925–1928), Jeff Cravath (1929–1931)

The Denver Ministers football program, 1920–1929 represented the University of Denver in college football during the 1920s as a member of the Rocky Mountain Conference. The program was led by four head coaches during the decade: Fred J. Murphy (1920–1922), Elmer McDevitt (1923–1924), Fred Dawson (1925–1928), and Jeff Cravath (1929–1931).

Highlights of the decade included:

- The 1921 team compiled a 4–2–1 record and outscored opponents by a total of 133 to 78.
- The 1922 team compiled a 6–1–1 record and outscored opponents by a total of 107 to 48.
- The 1923 team compiled a 6–3 record and outscored opponents by a total of 117 to 99.
- The 1927 team compiled a 5–2 record and outscored opponents by a total of 120 to 51.
- The 1929 team compiled a 5–1–1 record and outscored opponents by a total of 92 to 33.

== 1920 ==
1920 Denver Ministers football
- Conference: Rocky Mountain Conference
- Record: 2–4 (2–4 RMC)
- Head coach: Fred J. Murphy (1st season)
- Home stadium: Broadway Park

1920 Rocky Mountain Conference football standings
	Conf.					Overall
Team	W		L		T	W		L		T
Colorado Agricultural $	6	–	0	–	1	6	–	1	–	1
Colorado College	4	–	1	–	1	5	–	1	–	1
Colorado	3	–	1	–	2	4	–	1	–	2
Utah Agricultural	2	–	1	–	1	4	–	2	–	1
Denver	2	–	4	–	0	2	–	4	–	0
Utah	1	–	2	–	1	1	–	5	–	1
Wyoming	2	–	5	–	1	4	–	5	–	1
Colorado Mines	0	–	6	–	0	0	–	6	–	0
Montana State	0	–	0	–	1	4	–	1	–	1
$ – Conference champion

The 1920 Denver Ministers football team that represented the University of Denver as a member of the Rocky Mountain Conference (RMC) during the 1920 college football season. In their first season under head coach Fred J. Murphy, the Ministers compiled a 2–4 record, tied for fifth place in the RMC, and were outscored by a total of 82 to 46.

=== Schedule ===
Date	Opponent	Site	Result	Source
October 9	Wyoming	Denver, CO	L 7–10	
October 16	Colorado	Denver, CO	L 0–31	
October 23	Colorado College	Denver, CO	L 0–21	
November 6	at Colorado Mines	Golden, CO	W 16–6	
November 13	at Wyoming	Laramie, WY	W 3–0	
November 25	Colorado Agricultural	Broadway Park; Denver, CO	L 0–14	

== 1921 ==
1921 Denver Ministers football
- Conference: Rocky Mountain Conference
- Record: 4–2–1 (2–2–1 RMC)
- Head coach: Fred J. Murphy (2nd season)

1921 Rocky Mountain Conference football standings
	Conf.					Overall
Team	W		L		T	W		L		T
Utah Agricultural $	4	–	0	–	0	7	–	1	–	0
Colorado	4	–	0	–	1	4	–	1	–	1
Utah	2	–	1	–	1	3	–	2	–	1
Denver	2	–	2	–	1	4	–	2	–	1
Colorado Agricultural	2	–	2	–	1	2	–	3	–	1
Colorado College	2	–	4	–	0	4	–	4	–	0
Wyoming	1	–	3	–	2	1	–	4	–	2
Colorado Mines	1	–	5	–	0	1	–	5	–	0
Montana State	0	–	1	–	0	2	–	4	–	0
$ – Conference champion

The 1921 Denver Ministers football team represented the University of Denver as a member of the Rocky Mountain Conference (RMC) during the 1921 college football season. In their second season under head coach Fred J. Murphy, the Ministers compiled a 4–2–1 record (2–2–1 against conference opponents), tied for fourth place in the RMC, and outscored opponents by a total of 133 to 78.

=== Schedule ===
Date	Opponent	Site	Result	Source
October 1	Hays Normal*	Denver, CO	W 41–7	
October 15	Nebraska Wesleyan*	Denver, CO	W 21–3	
October 22	at Colorado	Gamble Field; Boulder, CO	L 7–10	
October 29	Wyoming	Denver, CO	T 9–9	
November 5	at Colorado Agricultural	Colorado Field; Fort Collins, CO	W 21–14	
November 19	Colorado Mines	Denver, CO	W 13–7	
November 24	at Colorado College	Washburn Field; Colorado Springs, CO	L 21–28	
*Non-conference game

== 1922 ==
1922 Denver Pioneers football
- Conference: Rocky Mountain Conference
- Record: 6–1–1 (3–1–1 RMC)
- Head coach: Fred J. Murphy (3rd season)

1922 Rocky Mountain Conference football standings
	Conf.					Overall
Team	W		L		T	W		L		T
Utah $	5	–	0	–	0	7	–	1	–	0
Colorado Agricultural	5	–	1	–	1	5	–	2	–	1
Denver	3	–	1	–	1	6	–	1	–	1
Colorado Mines	3	–	2	–	1	4	–	2	–	1
Utah Agricultural	3	–	3	–	0	5	–	4	–	0
Colorado College	2	–	2	–	1	3	–	3	–	1
Colorado	2	–	3	–	0	4	–	4	–	0
BYU	1	–	5	–	0	1	–	5	–	0
Wyoming	1	–	7	–	0	1	–	8	–	0
Montana State	0	–	1	–	0	4	–	4	–	0
$ – Conference champion

The 1922 Denver Pioneers football team represented the University of Denver as a member of the Rocky Mountain Conference (RMC) during the 1922 college football season. In their third and final season under head coach Fred J. Murphy, the Pioneers compiled a 6–1–1 record (3–1–1 against conference opponents), finished third in the RMC, and outscored opponents by a total of 107 to 48.

=== Schedule ===
Date	Opponent	Site	Result	Source
October 7	at New Mexico*	Varsity field; Albuquerque, NM	W 41–0	
October 14	at Regis*	Denver, CO	W 7–0	
October 21	at Nebraska Wesleyan*	Lincoln, NE	W 3–0	
October 28	Colorado	Denver, CO	W 16–0	
November 4	Wyoming	Denver, CO	W 7–0	
November 11	Colorado Mines	Broadway Park; Denver, CO	T 7–7	
November 18	Colorado College	Denver, CO	W 20–14	
November 30	Colorado Agricultural	Denver, CO	L 6–27	
*Non-conference game

== 1923 ==
1923 Denver Pioneers football
- Conference: Rocky Mountain Conference
- Record: 6–3 (4–3 RMC)
- Head coach: Elmer McDevitt (1st season)
- Home stadium: Broadway Park

1923 Rocky Mountain Conference football standings
	Conf.					Overall
Team	W		L		T	W		L		T
Colorado $	7	–	0	–	0	9	–	0	–	0
Colorado College	6	–	1	–	1	6	–	1	–	1
Colorado Agricultural	5	–	1	–	1	5	–	2	–	1
Utah Agricultural	4	–	2	–	0	5	–	2	–	0
Denver	4	–	3	–	0	6	–	3	–	0
Utah	2	–	3	–	0	4	–	3	–	0
Montana State	1	–	2	–	0	5	–	4	–	0
Colorado Mines	1	–	5	–	0	2	–	5	–	0
BYU	1	–	5	–	0	2	–	5	–	0
Wyoming	0	–	7	–	0	0	–	8	–	0
$ – Conference champion

The 1923 Denver Pioneers football team represented the University of Denver as a member of the Rocky Mountain Conference (RMC) during the 1923 college football season. In their first season under head coach Elmer McDevitt, the Pioneers compiled a 6–3 record (4–3 against conference opponents), finished fifth in the RMC, and outscored opponents by a total of 117 to 99.

=== Schedule ===
Date	Opponent	Site	Result	Source
September 29	Regis*	Broadway Park; Denver, CO	W 13–0	
October 6	at New Mexico*	Varsity field; Albuquerque, NM	W 10–7	
October 13	at Utah Agricultural	Adams Field; Logan, UT	W 14–7	
October 18	at Montana State	Bozeman, MT	W 7–6	
October 27	Colorado	Broadway Park; Denver, CO	L 7–21	
November 3	Wyoming	Broadway Park; Denver, CO	W 45–0	
November 10	at Colorado Agricultural	Colorado Field; Fort Collins, CO	L 0–25	
November 17	at Colorado College	Washburn Field; Colorado Springs, CO	L 0–20	
November 24	Colorado Mines	Broadway Park; Denver, CO	W 21–13	
*Non-conference game

== 1924 ==
1924 Denver Pioneers football
- Conference: Rocky Mountain Conference
- Record: 4–2–2 (3–2–2 RMC)
- Head coach: Elmer McDevitt (2nd season)

1924 Rocky Mountain Conference football standings
	Conf.					Overall
Team	W		L		T	W		L		T
Colorado $	5	–	0	–	1	8	–	1	–	1
Utah Agricultural	3	–	2	–	1	4	–	2	–	1
Colorado Agricultural	3	–	2	–	0	4	–	2	–	0
Denver	3	–	2	–	2	4	–	2	–	2
Colorado College	4	–	3	–	0	5	–	3	–	0
Montana State	1	–	1	–	1	5	–	1	–	1
Utah	2	–	2	–	1	3	–	4	–	1
Colorado Mines	2	–	4	–	1	4	–	4	–	1
BYU	1	–	3	–	1	2	–	3	–	1
Wyoming	1	–	6	–	0	2	–	6	–	0
$ – Conference champion

The 1924 Denver Pioneers football team represented the University of Denver as a member of the Rocky Mountain Conference (RMC) during the 1924 college football season. In their second and final season under head coach Elmer McDevitt, the Pioneers compiled a 4–2–2 record (3–2–2 against conference opponents), finished in a three-way tie for second place in the RMC, and outscored opponents by a total of 36 to 35.

=== Schedule ===
Date	Opponent	Site	Result	Attendance	Source
October 4	Regis*	Denver, CO	W 20–0		
October 11	Wyoming	Denver, CO	W 7–0		
October 18	Utah Agricultural	Broadway Park; Denver, CO	L 0–16		
October 25	at Colorado Mines	Brooks Field; Golden, CO	W 6–0		
November 1	Colorado College	Denver, CO	W 3–0		
November 8	Montana State	Denver, CO	T 0–0	6,000	
November 15	Colorado	Broadway Park; Denver, CO	T 0–0		
November 29	Colorado Agricultural	Broadway Park; Denver, CO	L 0–19		
*Non-conference game

== 1925 ==
1925 Denver Pioneers football
- Conference: Rocky Mountain Conference
- Record: 1–6 (1–6 RMC)
- Head coach: Fred Dawson (1st season)
- Home stadium: Denver University Stadium

1925 Rocky Mountain Conference football standings
	Conf.					Overall
Team	W		L		T	W		L		T
Colorado Agricultural $	8	–	0	–	0	9	–	1	–	0
Utah Agricultural	5	–	1	–	0	6	–	1	–	0
Utah	5	–	1	–	0	6	–	2	–	0
Colorado	5	–	2	–	0	6	–	3	–	0
Wyoming	4	–	3	–	0	6	–	3	–	0
BYU	3	–	3	–	0	3	–	3	–	0
Colorado College	4	–	4	–	0	5	–	4	–	1
Western State (CO)	2	–	4	–	0	3	–	4	–	0
Colorado Mines	2	–	6	–	0	2	–	7	–	0
Montana State	1	–	4	–	0	6	–	5	–	0
Denver	1	–	6	–	0	1	–	6	–	0
Colorado Teachers	0	–	6	–	0	2	–	6	–	1
$ – Conference champion

The 1925 Denver Pioneers football team represented the University of Denver as a member of the Rocky Mountain Conference (RMC) during the 1925 college football season. In their first season under head coach Fred Dawson, the Pioneers compiled a 1–6 record (1–6 against conference opponents), finished 11th in the RMC, and were outscored by a total of 152 to 27.

=== Schedule ===
Date	Opponent	Site	Result	Source
October 3	Colorado Teachers	Denver University Stadium; Denver, CO	W 13–0	
October 10	Utah Agricultural	Denver University Stadium; Denver, CO	L 0–13	
October 17	Colorado Agricultural	Denver University Stadium; Denver, CO	L 0–17	
October 24	Colorado Mines	Denver University Stadium; Denver, CO	L 7–16	
October 31	Colorado College	Denver University Stadium; Denver, CO	L 7–38	
November 7	at Utah	Cummings Field; Salt Lake City, UT	L 0–27	
November 26	Colorado	Denver University Stadium; Denver, CO	L 0–41	

== 1926 ==
1926 Denver Pioneers football
- Conference: Rocky Mountain Conference
- Record: 4–4 (4–4 RMC)
- Head coach: Fred Dawson (2nd season)
- Home stadium: Denver University Stadium

1926 Rocky Mountain Conference football standings
	Conf.					Overall
Team	W		L		T	W		L		T
Utah $	5	–	0	–	0	7	–	0	–	0
Montana State	4	–	0	–	0	4	–	2	–	1
Colorado College	5	–	2	–	0	5	–	2	–	0
Colorado Agricultural	5	–	2	–	0	6	–	2	–	1
Utah Agricultural	4	–	1	–	2	5	–	1	–	2
Colorado Teachers	3	–	3	–	0	6	–	4	–	0
Denver	4	–	4	–	0	4	–	4	–	0
Wyoming	1	–	2	–	2	2	–	4	–	2
Colorado	2	–	5	–	1	3	–	5	–	1
BYU	1	–	4	–	1	1	–	5	–	1
Colorado Mines	1	–	5	–	0	1	–	6	–	0
Western State (CO)	0	–	7	–	0	0	–	8	–	0
$ – Conference champion

The 1926 Denver Pioneers football team represented the University of Denver as a member of the Rocky Mountain Conference (RMC) during the 1926 college football season. In their second season under head coach Fred Dawson, the Pioneers compiled a 4–4 record (4–4 against conference opponents), tied for sixth place in the RMC, and outscored opponents by a total of 106 to 72.

=== Schedule ===
Date	Opponent	Site	Result	Attendance	Source
October 2	Colorado Mines	Denver University Stadium; Denver, CO	W 27–7		
October 9	Western State (CO)	Denver University Stadium; Denver, CO	W 21–13		
October 16	Colorado Agricultural	Denver University Stadium; Denver, CO	L 6–7		
October 23	Colorado Teachers	Denver University Stadium; Denver, CO	W 22–0		
October 30	Utah Agricultural	Denver University Stadium; Denver, CO	L 3–7		
November 6	Utah	Denver University Stadium; Denver, CO	L 0–13		
November 13	Colorado College	Denver University Stadium; Denver, CO	L 7–16		
November 25	Colorado	Denver University Stadium; Denver, CO	W 20–9		

== 1927 ==
1927 Denver Pioneers football
- Conference: Rocky Mountain Conference
- Record: 5–2 (5–1 RMC)
- Head coach: Fred Dawson (3rd season)
- Home stadium: Denver University Stadium

1927 Rocky Mountain Conference football standings
	Conf.					Overall
Team	W		L		T	W		L		T
Colorado Agricultural $	7	–	1	–	0	7	–	1	–	0
Denver	5	–	1	–	0	5	–	2	–	0
Montana State	3	–	1	–	0	4	–	4	–	0
Utah	3	–	1	–	1	3	–	3	–	1
Colorado College	5	–	2	–	0	6	–	2	–	0
Colorado	4	–	4	–	0	4	–	5	–	0
Utah Agricultural	3	–	3	–	1	3	–	4	–	1
BYU	2	–	4	–	0	2	–	4	–	1
Colorado Mines	2	–	5	–	0	2	–	5	–	0
Wyoming	1	–	4	–	0	4	–	5	–	0
Colorado Teachers	1	–	6	–	0	2	–	7	–	0
Western State (CO)	1	–	5	–	0	1	–	6	–	0
$ – Conference champion

The 1927 Denver Pioneers football team represented the University of Denver as a member of the Rocky Mountain Conference (RMC) during the 1927 college football season. In their third season under head coach Fred Dawson, the Pioneers compiled a 5–2 record (5–1 against conference opponents), finished second in the RMC, and outscored opponents by a total of 120 to 51.

=== Schedule ===
Date	Opponent	Site	Result	Attendance	Source
October 1	Colorado College	Denver University Stadium; Denver, CO	L 7–36		
October 8	Wyoming	Denver University Stadium; Denver, CO	W 7–0		
October 15	Colorado Agricultural	Denver University Stadium; Denver, CO	W 6–0		
October 22	Colorado Mines	Denver University Stadium; Denver, CO	W 39–0		
October 29	at Iowa*	Iowa Field; Iowa City, IA	L 0–15		
November 11	Utah Agricultural	Denver University Stadium; Denver, CO	W 13–0	10,000	
November 24	Colorado	Denver University Stadium; Denver, CO	W 48–0	17,000	
*Non-conference game

== 1928 ==
1928 Denver Pioneers football
- Conference: Rocky Mountain Conference
- Record: 4–4–1 (3–4–1 RMC)
- Head coach: Fred Dawson (4th season)
- Home stadium: Denver University Stadium

1928 Rocky Mountain Conference football standings
	Conf.					Overall
Team	W		L		T	W		L		T
Utah $	4	–	0	–	1	5	–	0	–	2
Colorado	5	–	1	–	0	5	–	1	–	0
Colorado Agricultural	6	–	2	–	0	6	–	2	–	0
Utah Agricultural	4	–	2	–	1	5	–	3	–	1
Colorado College	5	–	3	–	0	5	–	3	–	0
Montana State	3	–	2	–	0	4	–	4	–	1
Denver	3	–	4	–	1	4	–	4	–	1
Colorado Teachers	3	–	4	–	0	4	–	4	–	0
Colorado Mines	2	–	4	–	0	2	–	5	–	0
BYU	1	–	3	–	1	3	–	3	–	1
Wyoming	0	–	5	–	0	2	–	7	–	0
Western State (CO)	0	–	6	–	0	0	–	7	–	0
$ – Conference champion

The 1928 Denver Pioneers football team represented the University of Denver as a member of the Rocky Mountain Conference (RMC) during the 1928 college football season. In their fourth and final season under head coach Fred Dawson, the Pioneers compiled a 4–4–1 record (3–4–1 against conference opponents), finished seventh in the RMC, and outscored opponents by a total of 128 to 96.

=== Schedule ===
Date	Opponent	Site	Result	Attendance	Source
September 29	Western State (CO)	Denver University Stadium; Denver, CO	W 37–6		
October 6	Colorado Mines	Denver University Stadium; Denver, CO	L 12–13		
October 13	Utah Agricultural	Denver University Stadium; Denver, CO	T 7–7		
October 20	Colorado College	Denver University Stadium; Denver, CO	L 13–18		
November 3	Wyoming	Denver University Stadium; Denver, CO	W 26–7		
November 10	at Colorado Teachers	Jackson Field; Greeley, CO	W 20–11		
November 17	Colorado Agricultural^{†}	Denver University Stadium; Denver, CO	L 0–15		
November 29	Colorado	Denver University Stadium; Denver, CO	L 0–7		
December 15	at Hawaii*	Honolulu Stadium; Honolulu, HI	W 13–12		
*Non-conference game; ^{†}Homecoming

== 1929 ==
1929 Denver Pioneers football
- Conference: Rocky Mountain Conference
- Record: 5–1–1 (4–1–1 RMC)
- Head coach: Jeff Cravath (1st season)
- Home stadium: Denver University Stadium

1929 Rocky Mountain Conference football standings
	Conf.					Overall
Team	W		L		T	W		L		T
Utah $	6	–	0	–	0	7	–	0	–	0
Colorado	4	–	1	–	1	5	–	1	–	1
Denver	4	–	1	–	1	5	–	1	–	1
Montana State	2	–	1	–	0	6	–	2	–	0
BYU	4	–	2	–	0	5	–	3	–	0
Colorado Teachers	3	–	2	–	0	4	–	3	–	0
Colorado College	4	–	3	–	0	4	–	3	–	0
Colorado Agricultural	4	–	4	–	0	5	–	4	–	0
Utah State	3	–	4	–	0	3	–	4	–	0
Colorado Mines	1	–	5	–	0	2	–	5	–	0
Western State (CO)	0	–	5	–	0	2	–	5	–	0
Wyoming	0	–	7	–	0	1	–	7	–	0
$ – Conference champion

The 1929 Denver Pioneers football team was an American football team that represented the University of Denver as a member of the Rocky Mountain Conference (RMC) during the 1929 college football season. In their first season under head coach Jeff Cravath, the Pioneers compiled a 5–1–1 record (4–1–1 against conference opponents), tied for second in the RMC, and outscored opponents by a total of 92 to 33.

=== Schedule ===
Date	Opponent	Site	Result	Attendance	Source
October 5	Colorado Mines	Denver University Stadium; Denver, CO	W 7–0		
October 12	Wyoming	Denver University Stadium; Denver, CO	W 19–6		
October 19	Colorado College	Denver University Stadium; Denver, CO	L 2–3	16,000	
November 2	at Colorado	Colorado Stadium; Boulder, CO	T 0–0		
November 16	Utah State	Denver University Stadium; Denver, CO	W 13–0		
November 28	Colorado Agricultural	Denver University Stadium; Denver, CO	W 19–6	20,000	
December 7	Regis*	Denver University Stadium; Denver, CO	W 32–18		
*Non-conference game
