= 1927 Wyoming Cowboys football team =

American college football season

1927 Wyoming Cowboys football
- Conference: Rocky Mountain Conference
- Record: 4–5 (1–4 RMC)
- Head coach: George McLaren (1st season)
- Captain: None
- Home stadium: Campus athletic grounds

1927 Rocky Mountain Conference football standings
	Conf.					Overall
Team	W		L		T	W		L		T
Colorado Agricultural $	7	–	1	–	0	7	–	1	–	0
Denver	5	–	1	–	0	5	–	2	–	0
Montana State	3	–	1	–	0	4	–	4	–	0
Utah	3	–	1	–	1	3	–	3	–	1
Colorado College	5	–	2	–	0	6	–	2	–	0
Colorado	4	–	4	–	0	4	–	5	–	0
Utah Agricultural	3	–	3	–	1	3	–	4	–	1
BYU	2	–	4	–	0	2	–	4	–	1
Colorado Mines	2	–	5	–	0	2	–	5	–	0
Wyoming	1	–	4	–	0	4	–	5	–	0
Western State (CO)	1	–	5	–	0	1	–	6	–	0
Colorado Teachers	1	–	6	–	0	2	–	7	–	0
$ – Conference champion

The 1927 Wyoming Cowboys football team was an American football team that represented the University of Wyoming as a member of the Rocky Mountain Conference (RMC) during the 1927 college football season. In their first season under head coach George McLaren, the Cowboys compiled a 4–5 record (1–4 against conference opponents), finished tenth in the RMC, and outscored opponents by a total of 122 to 105.

== Schedule ==
Date	Opponent	Site	Result	Source
September 24	Spearfish*	Campus athletic grounds; Laramie, WY	W 31–6	
October 1	at Creighton*	Creighton Stadium; Omaha, NE	L 0–13	
October 8	at Denver	Denver University Stadium; Denver, CO	L 0–7	
October 15	Chadron Normal*	Campus athletic grounds; Laramie, WY	W 30–13	
October 22	at Utah Agricultural	Aggie Stadium; Logan, UT (rivalry)	L 0–42	
October 29	Colorado College	Campus athletic grounds; Laramie, WY	L 8–12	
November 11	vs. Montana State	Sheridan, WY	L 0–6	
November 19	Montezuma College*	Campus athletic grounds; Laramie, WY	W 26–0	
November 24	at Colorado Teachers	Jackson Field; Greeley, CO	W 27–6	
*Non-conference game
