= 1927 North Dakota Agricultural Bison football team =

American college football season

1927 North Dakota Agricultural Bison football
- Conference: North Central Conference
- Record: 3–5 (1–3 NCC)
- Head coach: Ion Cortright (3rd season)
- Captain: Cy Peschel
- Home stadium: Dacotah Field

1927 North Central Conference football standings
	Conf.					Overall
Team	W		L		T	W		L		T
South Dakota +	5	–	0	–	0	7	–	2	–	0
Creighton +	2	–	0	–	0	6	–	1	–	1
South Dakota State	2	–	2	–	0	5	–	3	–	0
North Dakota	2	–	2	–	0	4	–	4	–	0
Morningside	1	–	3	–	0	3	–	5	–	0
North Dakota Agricultural	1	–	3	–	0	3	–	5	–	0
Nebraska Wesleyan	0	–	3	–	0	0	–	8	–	1
+ – Conference co-champions

The 1927 North Dakota Agricultural Bison football team was an American football team that represented North Dakota Agricultural College (now known as North Dakota State University) in the North Central Conference (NCC) during the 1927 college football season. In its third season under head coach Ion Cortright, the team compiled a 3–5 record (1–3 against NCC opponents) and finished in fifth place out of teams in the NCC. The team played its home games at Dacotah Field in Fargo, North Dakota.

== Schedule ==
Date	Opponent	Site	Result	Source
September 24	at Montana State*	Bozeman, MT	L 0–22	
October 8	Valley City State*	Dacotah Field; Fargo, ND	W 37–0	
October 15	South Dakota State^{†}	Dacotah Field; Fargo, ND (rivalry)	L 0–33	
October 22	Saint Mary's (MN)	Dacotah Field; Fargo, ND	L 0–6	
October 29	North Dakota	Dacotah Field; Fargo, ND (rivalry)	L 0–13	
November 5	at St. Thomas (MN)*	Saint Paul, MN	W 7–6	
November 11	at South Dakota	Vermillion, SD	L 0–13	
November 24	at DePaul	Wrigley Field; Chicago, IL	W 21–6	
*Non-conference game; ^{†}Homecoming
