= 1928 Colorado Silver and Gold football team =

American college football season

1928 Colorado Silver and Gold football
- Conference: Rocky Mountain Conference
- Record: 5–1 (5–1 RMC)
- Head coach: Myron E. Witham (9th season)
- Captain: Buck Smith
- Home stadium: Colorado Stadium

1928 Rocky Mountain Conference football standings
	Conf.					Overall
Team	W		L		T	W		L		T
Utah $	4	–	0	–	1	5	–	0	–	2
Colorado	5	–	1	–	0	5	–	1	–	0
Colorado Agricultural	6	–	2	–	0	6	–	2	–	0
Utah Agricultural	4	–	2	–	1	5	–	3	–	1
Colorado College	5	–	3	–	0	5	–	3	–	0
Montana State	3	–	2	–	0	4	–	4	–	1
Denver	3	–	4	–	1	4	–	4	–	1
Colorado Teachers	3	–	4	–	0	4	–	4	–	0
Colorado Mines	2	–	4	–	0	2	–	5	–	0
BYU	1	–	3	–	1	3	–	3	–	1
Wyoming	0	–	5	–	0	2	–	7	–	0
Western State (CO)	0	–	6	–	0	0	–	7	–	0
$ – Conference champion

The 1928 Colorado Silver and Gold football team was an American football team that represented the University of Colorado as a member of the Rocky Mountain Conference (RMC) during the 1928 college football season. Led by ninth-year head coach Myron E. Witham, Colorado compiled an overall record of 5–1 with an identical mark in conference play, placing second in the RMC.

== Schedule ==
Date	Opponent	Site	Result	Source
October 13	at Colorado Teachers	Jackson Field; Greeley, CO	W 21–6	
October 20	Colorado Mines	Colorado Stadium; Boulder, CO	W 39–0	
October 27	Utah^{†}	Colorado Stadium; Boulder, CO (rivalry)	L 6–25	
November 10	Colorado Agricultural	Colorado Stadium; Boulder, CO (rivalry)	W 13–7	
November 17	at Colorado College	Washburn Field; Colorado Springs, CO	W 24–19	
November 29	at Denver	Hilltop Stadium; Denver, CO	W 7–0	
^{†}Homecoming
