= 1924 Utah Utes football team =

American college football season

1924 Utah Utes football
- Conference: Rocky Mountain Conference
- Record: 3–4–1 (2–2–1 RMC)
- Head coach: Thomas M. Fitzpatrick (6th season)
- Home stadium: Cummings Field

1924 Rocky Mountain Conference football standings
| | Conf. | | | | | Overall |
| Team | W | | L | | T | W | | L | | T |
|---|---|---|---|---|---|---|---|---|---|---|
| Colorado $ | 5 | – | 0 | – | 1 | 8 | – | 1 | – | 1 |
| Utah Agricultural | 3 | – | 2 | – | 1 | 4 | – | 2 | – | 1 |
| Colorado Agricultural | 3 | – | 2 | – | 0 | 4 | – | 2 | – | 0 |
| Denver | 3 | – | 2 | – | 2 | 4 | – | 2 | – | 2 |
| Colorado College | 4 | – | 3 | – | 0 | 5 | – | 3 | – | 0 |
| Montana State | 1 | – | 1 | – | 1 | 5 | – | 1 | – | 1 |
| Utah | 2 | – | 2 | – | 1 | 3 | – | 4 | – | 1 |
| Colorado Mines | 2 | – | 4 | – | 1 | 4 | – | 4 | – | 1 |
| BYU | 1 | – | 3 | – | 1 | 2 | – | 3 | – | 1 |
| Wyoming | 1 | – | 6 | – | 0 | 2 | – | 6 | – | 0 |
$ – Conference champion

The 1924 Utah Utes football team was an American football team that represented the University of Utah as a member of the Rocky Mountain Conference (RMC) during the 1924 college football season. Led by Thomas M. Fitzpatrick in his sixth and final season as head coach, the Utes compiled an overall of record of 3–4–1 with a mark of 2–2–1 in conference play, tying for sixth place in the RMC.

Prior to the 1924 season, Fitzpatrick announced his intention to retire and pursue other business opportunities, but he agreed to coach through the end of the 1924 season. Utah opened the season at home on October 4 against Drake, their first opponent from east of the Rocky Mountains. Ike Armstrong, and assistant coach for Drake, expressed interest in the head coaching position at Utah and was hired. He coached the Utes for 25 season and had a record of 141–55–15.

== Schedule ==
| Date | Opponent | Site | Result | Attendance | Source |
|---|---|---|---|---|---|
| October 4 | Drake* | Cummings Field; Salt Lake City, UT | L 14–33 | | |
| October 11 | Colorado College | Cummings Field; Salt Lake City, UT | L 0–9 | | |
| October 18 | Arizona*^{†} | Cummings Field; Salt Lake City, UT | W 32–7 | | |
| October 25 | BYU | Cummings Field; Salt Lake City, UT (rivalry) | W 35–6 | | |
| November 1 | at Colorado | Colorado Stadium; Boulder, CO (rivalry) | L 0–3 | | |
| November 8 | vs. Stanford* | California Memorial Stadium; Berkeley, CA | L 0–30 | 5,000 | |
| November 15 | Wyoming | Cummings Field; Salt Lake City, UT | W 28–0 | | |
| November 27 | Utah Agricultural | Cummings Field; Salt Lake City, UT (rivalry) | T 7–7 | 11,000 | |
*Non-conference game; ^{†}Homecoming
