= 1921 Wyoming Cowboys football team =

American college football season

1921 Wyoming Cowboys football
- Conference: Rocky Mountain Conference
- Record: 1–4–2 (1–3–2 RMC)
- Head coach: John Corbett (6th season)
- Captain: Robert Steele Wilson

1921 Rocky Mountain Conference football standings
	Conf.					Overall
Team	W		L		T	W		L		T
Utah Agricultural $	4	–	0	–	0	7	–	1	–	0
Colorado	4	–	0	–	1	4	–	1	–	1
Utah	2	–	1	–	1	3	–	2	–	1
Denver	2	–	2	–	1	4	–	2	–	1
Colorado Agricultural	2	–	2	–	1	2	–	3	–	1
Colorado College	2	–	4	–	0	4	–	4	–	0
Wyoming	1	–	3	–	2	1	–	4	–	2
Colorado Mines	1	–	5	–	0	1	–	5	–	0
Montana State	0	–	1	–	0	2	–	4	–	0
$ – Conference champion

The 1921 Wyoming Cowboys football team was an American football team that represented the University of Wyoming as a member of the Rocky Mountain Conference (RMC) during the 1921 college football season. In their sixth season under head coach John Corbett, the Cowboys compiled a 1–4–2 record (1–3–2 against conference opponents), tied for sixth in the RMC, and were outscored by a total of 92 to 39. Robert Steele Wilson was the team captain.

== Schedule ==
Date	Opponent	Site	Result	Attendance	Source
October 1	at Colorado Agricultural	Colorado Field; Fort Collins, CO (rivalry)	T 7–7		
October 8	Colorado College	Laramie, WY	L 0–10		
October 11	at Utah Agricultural	Adams Field; Logan, UT (rivalry)	L 3–14		
October 15	at Utah	Cummings Field; Salt Lake City, UT	L 3–14		
October 22	Colorado Mines	Laramie, WY	W 14–7		
October 29	at Denver	Denver, CO	T 9–9		
November 11	vs. Idaho*	Public School Field; Boise, ID	L 3–31	7,000–8,000	
*Non-conference game
