= 1927 Colorado Silver and Gold football team =

American college football season

1927 Colorado Silver and Gold football
- Conference: Rocky Mountain Conference
- Record: 4–5 (4–4 RMC)
- Head coach: Myron E. Witham (8th season)
- Captain: George Wittemeyer
- Home stadium: Colorado Stadium

1927 Rocky Mountain Conference football standings
	Conf.					Overall
Team	W		L		T	W		L		T
Colorado Agricultural $	7	–	1	–	0	7	–	1	–	0
Denver	5	–	1	–	0	5	–	2	–	0
Montana State	3	–	1	–	0	4	–	4	–	0
Utah	3	–	1	–	1	3	–	3	–	1
Colorado College	5	–	2	–	0	6	–	2	–	0
Colorado	4	–	4	–	0	4	–	5	–	0
Utah Agricultural	3	–	3	–	1	3	–	4	–	1
BYU	2	–	4	–	0	2	–	4	–	1
Colorado Mines	2	–	5	–	0	2	–	5	–	0
Wyoming	1	–	4	–	0	4	–	5	–	0
Colorado Teachers	1	–	6	–	0	2	–	7	–	0
Western State (CO)	1	–	5	–	0	1	–	6	–	0
$ – Conference champion

The 1927 Colorado Silver and Gold football team was an American football team that represented the University of Colorado as a member of the Rocky Mountain Conference (RMC) during the 1927 college football season. Led by eighth-year head coach Myron E. Witham, Colorado compiled an overall record of 4–5 with a mark of 4–4 in conference play, tying for sixth place in the RMC.

== Schedule ==
Date	Opponent	Site	Result	Attendance	Source
October 1	Western State (CO)	Colorado Stadium; Boulder, CO	W 25–6		
October 8	at Montana State	Gatton Field; Bozeman, MT	L 6–12		
October 15	Colorado Teachers	Colorado Stadium; Boulder, CO	W 43–0		
October 22	at Utah	Ute Stadium; Salt Lake City, UT (rivalry)	L 13–20		
October 29	Colorado Mines	Colorado Stadium; Boulder, CO	W 28–18	2,000	
November 5	Colorado College^{†}	Colorado Stadium; Boulder, CO	W 7–6		
November 12	at USC*	Los Angeles Memorial Coliseum; Los Angeles, CA	L 7–46	25,000	
November 19	at Colorado Agricultural	Colorado Field; Fort Collins, CO (rivalry)	L 7–39		
November 24	at Denver	Hilltop Stadium; Denver, CO	L 0–48	17,000	
*Non-conference game; ^{†}Homecoming
