= 1925 Colorado Silver and Gold football team =

American college football season

1925 Colorado Silver and Gold football
- Conference: Rocky Mountain Conference
- Record: 6–3 (5–2 RMC)
- Head coach: Myron E. Witham (6th season)
- Captain: Olin Hatfield Chilson
- Home stadium: Norlin Stadium

1925 Rocky Mountain Conference football standings
	Conf.					Overall
Team	W		L		T	W		L		T
Colorado Agricultural $	8	–	0	–	0	9	–	1	–	0
Utah Agricultural	5	–	1	–	0	6	–	1	–	0
Utah	5	–	1	–	0	6	–	2	–	0
Colorado	5	–	2	–	0	6	–	3	–	0
Wyoming	4	–	3	–	0	6	–	3	–	0
BYU	3	–	3	–	0	3	–	3	–	0
Colorado College	4	–	4	–	0	5	–	4	–	1
Western State (CO)	2	–	4	–	0	3	–	4	–	0
Colorado Mines	2	–	6	–	0	2	–	7	–	0
Montana State	1	–	4	–	0	6	–	5	–	0
Denver	1	–	6	–	0	1	–	6	–	0
Colorado Teachers	0	–	6	–	0	2	–	6	–	1
$ – Conference champion

The 1925 Colorado Silver and Gold football team was an American football team that represented the University of Colorado as a member of the Rocky Mountain Conference (RMC) during the 1925 college football season. In its sixth season under head coach Myron E. Witham, the team compiled an overall record of 6–3 record with a mark of 5–2 in conference play, placing fourth in the RMC. This marked the team's first full season in Norlin Stadium (later renamed Folsom Field, which was dedicated at the end of 1924 season.

== Schedule ==
Date	Opponent	Site	Result	Attendance	Source
September 26	Chadron Normal*	Norlin Stadium; Boulder, CO	L 0–3		
October 3	Montana State	Norlin Stadium; Boulder, CO	W 23–3		
October 7	at Creighton*	Omaha, NE	W 14–6		
October 24	at Utah	Cummings Field; Salt Lake City, UT (rivalry)	L 7–12		
October 31	at Colorado Mines	Campbell Field; Golden, CO	W 14–3		
November 7	Colorado College^{†}	Norlin Stadium; Boulder, CO	W 23–6	9,745	
November 14	at Colorado Agricultural	Colorado Field; Fort Collins, CO (rivalry)	L 0–12	7,887	
November 21	Western State (CO)	Norlin Stadium; Boulder, CO	W 34–0		
November 26	at Denver	Hilltop Stadium; Denver, CO	W 41–0		
*Non-conference game; ^{†}Homecoming
