= 1929 Utah Utes football team =

American college football season

1929 Utah Utes football

RMC champion
- Conference: Rocky Mountain Conference
- Record: 7–0 (6–0 RMC)
- Head coach: Ike Armstrong (5th season)
- Captain: Bob Davis
- Home stadium: Ute Stadium

1929 Rocky Mountain Conference football standings
	Conf.					Overall
Team	W		L		T	W		L		T
Utah $	6	–	0	–	0	7	–	0	–	0
Colorado	4	–	1	–	1	5	–	1	–	1
Denver	4	–	1	–	1	5	–	1	–	1
Montana State	2	–	1	–	0	6	–	2	–	0
BYU	4	–	2	–	0	5	–	3	–	0
Colorado Teachers	3	–	2	–	0	4	–	3	–	0
Colorado College	4	–	3	–	0	4	–	3	–	0
Colorado Agricultural	4	–	4	–	0	5	–	4	–	0
Utah State	3	–	4	–	0	3	–	4	–	0
Colorado Mines	1	–	5	–	0	2	–	5	–	0
Western State (CO)	0	–	5	–	0	2	–	5	–	0
Wyoming	0	–	7	–	0	1	–	7	–	0
$ – Conference champion

The 1929 Utah Utes football team was an American football team that represented the University of Utah in the Rocky Mountain Conference (RMC) during the 1929 college football season. In their fifth season under head coach Ike Armstrong, the Utes compiled an overall record of 7–0 with a mark of 6–0 against conference opponents, won the RMC championship, shut out four of seven opponents, and outscored all opponents by a total of 219 to 23. The 1929 season was part of a 24-game unbeaten streak that began on November 12, 1927, and continued until September 26, 1931.

Bob Davis was the team captain. Two Utah players received recognition on the 1929 All-America team: tackle Alton Carman (3rd team, INS); and center Marvin Jones (3rd team, INS; 3rd team, Consolidated Press).

== Schedule ==
Date	Opponent	Site	Result	Attendance	Source
October 5	Nevada*	Ute Stadium; Salt Lake City, UT	W 31–0	6,700	
October 19	Colorado^{†}	Ute Stadium; Salt Lake City, UT (rivalry)	W 40–0	13,000	
October 26	at Colorado Agricultural	Colorado Field; Fort Collins, CO	W 21–0	10,000	
November 2	BYU	Ute Stadium; Salt Lake City, UT (rivalry)	W 45–13	8,000	
November 9	at Colorado College	Washburn Field; Colorado Springs, CO	W 12–3	7,500	
November 16	at Wyoming	Campus athletic grounds; Laramie, WY	W 44–0		
November 28	Utah State	Ute Stadium; Salt Lake City, UT (rivalry)	W 26–7	16,000	
*Non-conference game; ^{†}Homecoming
