= 1929 Utah State Aggies football team =

American college football season

1929 Utah State Aggies football
- Conference: Rocky Mountain Conference
- Record: 3–4 (3–4 RMC)
- Head coach: Dick Romney (11th season)
- Home stadium: Aggie Stadium

1929 Rocky Mountain Conference football standings
	Conf.					Overall
Team	W		L		T	W		L		T
Utah $	6	–	0	–	0	7	–	0	–	0
Colorado	4	–	1	–	1	5	–	1	–	1
Denver	4	–	1	–	1	5	–	1	–	1
Montana State	2	–	1	–	0	6	–	2	–	0
BYU	4	–	2	–	0	5	–	3	–	0
Colorado Teachers	3	–	2	–	0	4	–	3	–	0
Colorado College	4	–	3	–	0	4	–	3	–	0
Colorado Agricultural	4	–	4	–	0	5	–	4	–	0
Utah State	3	–	4	–	0	3	–	4	–	0
Colorado Mines	1	–	5	–	0	2	–	5	–	0
Western State (CO)	0	–	5	–	0	2	–	5	–	0
Wyoming	0	–	7	–	0	1	–	7	–	0
$ – Conference champion

The 1929 Utah State Aggies football team was an American football team that represented Utah State Agricultural College in the Rocky Mountain Conference (RMC) during the 1929 college football season. In their 11th season under head coach Dick Romney, the Aggies compiled a 3–4 record (3–4 against RMC opponents), finished ninth in the conference, and were outscored by a total of 60 to 50.

== Schedule ==
Date	Opponent	Site	Result	Attendance	Source
October 5	at Montana State	Gatton Field; Bozeman, MT	W 9–0		
October 18	vs. BYU	Lorin Farr Park; Ogden, UT (rivalry)	L 6–7		
October 26	at Wyoming	Campus athletic grounds; Laramie, WY (rivalry)	W 12–7		
November 2	Colorado College	Aggie Stadium; Logan, UT	W 10–0		
November 9	Colorado Agricultural	Aggie Stadium; Logan, UT	L 6–7		
November 16	at Denver	DU Stadium; Denver, CO	L 0–13		
November 28	at Utah	Ute Stadium; Salt Lake City, UT (Battle of the Brothers)	L 7–26	16,000	
