= 1927 Montana State Bobcats football team =

American college football season

1927 Montana State Bobcats football
- Conference: Rocky Mountain Conference
- Record: 4–4 (3–1 RMC)
- Head coach: G. Ott Romney (6th season)
- Home stadium: Gatton Field

1927 Rocky Mountain Conference football standings
	Conf.					Overall
Team	W		L		T	W		L		T
Colorado Agricultural $	7	–	1	–	0	7	–	1	–	0
Denver	5	–	1	–	0	5	–	2	–	0
Montana State	3	–	1	–	0	4	–	4	–	0
Utah	3	–	1	–	1	3	–	3	–	1
Colorado College	5	–	2	–	0	6	–	2	–	0
Colorado	4	–	4	–	0	4	–	5	–	0
Utah Agricultural	3	–	3	–	1	3	–	4	–	1
BYU	2	–	4	–	0	2	–	4	–	1
Colorado Mines	2	–	5	–	0	2	–	5	–	0
Wyoming	1	–	4	–	0	4	–	5	–	0
Western State (CO)	1	–	5	–	0	1	–	6	–	0
Colorado Teachers	1	–	6	–	0	2	–	7	–	0
$ – Conference champion

The 1927 Montana State Bobcats football team represented Montana State College (later renamed Montana State University) in the Rocky Mountain Conference (RMC) during the 1927 college football season. In its sixth and final season under head coach G. Ott Romney, the team compiled a 4–4 record (3–1 against RMC opponents), tied for third in the conference, and was outscored by a total of 104 to 79.

== Schedule ==
Date	Opponent	Site	Result	Attendance	Source
September 24	North Dakota Agricultural*	Gatton Field; Bozeman, MT	W 22–0		
October 1	at Idaho*	MacLean Field; Moscow, ID	L 12–19		
October 8	Colorado	Gatton Field; Bozeman, MT	W 12–6		
October 15	vs. Utah Agricultural	Lorin Farr Park; Ogden, UT	W 13–6		
October 22	at Colorado College	Washburn Field; Colorado Springs, CO	L 7–28		
October 29	at Purdue*	Ross–Ade Stadium; West Lafayette, IN	L 7–39	7,000	
November 11	vs. Wyoming	Sheridan, WY	W 6–0		
November 19	vs. Montana*	Clark Park; Butte, MT (rivalry)	L 0–6	5,500	
*Non-conference game
