= 1927 Creighton Bluejays football team =

American college football season

1927 Creighton Bluejays football

NCC co-champion
- Conference: North Central Conference
- Record: 6–1–1 (2–0 NCC)
- Head coach: Chet A. Wynne (5th season)
- Home stadium: Creighton Stadium

1927 North Central Conference football standings
	Conf.					Overall
Team	W		L		T	W		L		T
South Dakota +	5	–	0	–	0	7	–	2	–	0
Creighton +	2	–	0	–	0	6	–	1	–	1
South Dakota State	2	–	2	–	0	5	–	3	–	0
North Dakota	2	–	2	–	0	4	–	4	–	0
Morningside	1	–	3	–	0	3	–	5	–	0
North Dakota Agricultural	1	–	3	–	0	3	–	5	–	0
Nebraska Wesleyan	0	–	3	–	0	0	–	8	–	1
+ – Conference co-champions

The 1927 Creighton Bluejays football team was an American football team that represented Creighton University as a member of the North Central Conference (NCC) during the 1927 college football season. In its fifth season under head coach Chet A. Wynne, the team compiled a 6–1–1 record (2–0 against NCC opponents) and outscored opponents by a total of 103 to 46. The team played its home games at Creighton Stadium in Omaha, Nebraska.

== Schedule ==
Date	Opponent	Site	Result	Attendance	Source
October 1	Wyoming*	Creighton Stadium; Omaha, NE	W 13–0		
October 8	at North Dakota	Memorial Stadium; Grand Forks, ND	W 7–0		
October 15	at Oklahoma*	Memorial Stadium; Norman, OK	T 13–13		
October 22	Marquette^{†}*	Creighton Stadium; Omaha, NE	W 14–0	10,000	
October 29	at Oklahoma A&M*	Lewis Field; Stillwater, OK	L 6–18		
November 5	at Utah*	Ute Stadium; Salt Lake City, UT	W 16–7		
November 12	South Dakota State	Creighton Stadium; Omaha, NE	W 14–0	5,000	
November 19	Saint Louis*	Creighton Stadium; Omaha, NE	W 20–8		
*Non-conference game; ^{†}Homecoming
