= 1924 Utah Agricultural Aggies football team =

American college football season

1924 Utah Agricultural Aggies football
- Conference: Rocky Mountain Conference
- Record: 4–2–1 (3–2–1 RMC)
- Head coach: Dick Romney (6th season)
- Home stadium: Adams Field

1924 Rocky Mountain Conference football standings
	Conf.					Overall
Team	W		L		T	W		L		T
Colorado $	5	–	0	–	1	8	–	1	–	1
Utah Agricultural	3	–	2	–	1	4	–	2	–	1
Colorado Agricultural	3	–	2	–	0	4	–	2	–	0
Denver	3	–	2	–	2	4	–	2	–	2
Colorado College	4	–	3	–	0	5	–	3	–	0
Montana State	1	–	1	–	1	5	–	1	–	1
Utah	2	–	2	–	1	3	–	4	–	1
Colorado Mines	2	–	4	–	1	4	–	4	–	1
BYU	1	–	3	–	1	2	–	3	–	1
Wyoming	1	–	6	–	0	2	–	6	–	0
$ – Conference champion

The 1924 Utah State Aggies football team was an American football team that represented Utah State Agricultural College—now known as Utah State University—as a member of the Rocky Mountain Conference (RMC) during the 1924 college football season. In their sixth season under head coach Dick Romney, the Aggies compiled an overall record of 4–2–1 record with mark of 3–2–1 against conference opponents, finished in a three-way tie for second place in the RMC, and outscored opponents by a total of 127 to 52.

== Schedule ==
Date	Opponent	Site	Result	Attendance	Source
October 4	vs. Colorado Mines	Ogden, UT	L 6–17		
October 11	Montana Mines*	Adams Field; Logan, UT	W 47–0		
October 18	at Denver	Broadway Park; Denver, CO	W 16–0		
October 25	at Colorado Agricultural	Colorado Field; Fort Collins, CO	L 13–17		
November 7	at BYU	Provo, UT (rivalry)	W 13–9		
November 12	Wyoming	Adams Field; Logan, UT (rivalry)	W 25–2		
November 27	at Utah	Cummings Field; Salt Lake City, UT (Battle of the Brothers)	T 7–7	11,000	
*Non-conference game
