= 1928 Montana State Bobcats football team =

American college football season

1928 Montana State Bobcats football
- Conference: Rocky Mountain Conference
- Record: 4–4–1 (3–2 RMC)
- Head coach: Schubert R. Dyche (1st season)
- Home stadium: Gatton Field

1928 Rocky Mountain Conference football standings
	Conf.					Overall
Team	W		L		T	W		L		T
Utah $	4	–	0	–	1	5	–	0	–	2
Colorado	5	–	1	–	0	5	–	1	–	0
Colorado Agricultural	6	–	2	–	0	6	–	2	–	0
Utah Agricultural	4	–	2	–	1	5	–	3	–	1
Colorado College	5	–	3	–	0	5	–	3	–	0
Montana State	3	–	2	–	0	4	–	4	–	1
Denver	3	–	4	–	1	4	–	4	–	1
Colorado Teachers	3	–	4	–	0	4	–	4	–	0
Colorado Mines	2	–	4	–	0	2	–	5	–	0
BYU	1	–	3	–	1	3	–	3	–	1
Wyoming	0	–	5	–	0	2	–	7	–	0
Western State (CO)	0	–	6	–	0	0	–	7	–	0
$ – Conference champion

The 1928 Montana State Bobcats football team represented Montana State College (later renamed Montana State University) in the Rocky Mountain Conference (RMC) during the 1928 college football season. In its first season under head coach Schubert R. Dyche, the team compiled a 4–4–1 record (3–2 against RMC opponents), finished sixth in the conference, and was outscored by a total of 121 to 81.

== Schedule ==
Date	Opponent	Site	Result	Attendance	Source
September 29	at Idaho*	MacLean Field; Moscow, ID	W 15–13		
October 6	at Colorado College	Washburn Field; Colorado Springs, CO	L 14–32		
October 13	at Nebraska*	Memorial Stadium; Lincoln, NE	L 6–26		
October 20	Colorado Teachers	Gatton Field; Bozeman, MT	W 6–2		
October 27	vs. Montana*	Clark Park; Butte, MT (rivalry)	T 0–0	7,000	
November 3	BYU	Gatton Field; Bozeman, MT	W 19–7		
November 10	vs. Wyoming	Midland Empire Fairgrounds; Billings, MT	W 14–7	5,000	
November 17	at Utah Agricultural	Aggie Stadium; Logan, UT	L 7–15		
November 29	vs. Mount St. Charles*	Sheridan, WY	L 0–19		
*Non-conference game
