= Fred Dawson =

American sports coach (1884–1965)

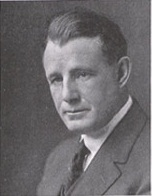
- Dawson from 1921 Cornhusker

Biographical details
- Born: April 26, 1884; Warren, Massachusetts, U.S.
- Died: August 18, 1965 (aged 81); Omaha, Nebraska, U.S.

Coaching career (HC unless noted)

Football
- 1912–1916: Union (NY)
- 1917: Princeton (freshmen)
- 1918–1919: Columbia
- 1921–1924: Nebraska
- 1925–1928: Denver
- 1931–1933: Virginia

Basketball
- 1912–1917: Union (NY)
- 1918–1919: Columbia

Baseball
- 1913–1916: Union (NY)
- 1918: Princeton
- 1919: Columbia

Administrative career (AD unless noted)
- 1922–1925: Nebraska

Head coaching record
- Overall: 79–55–13 (football); 56–24 (basketball); 36–31 (baseball)

Frederick Thomas Dawson (April 26, 1884 – August 18, 1965) was an American football, basketball, and baseball coach. He served as the head football coach at Union College in Schenectady, New York (1912–1916), Columbia University (1918–1919), the University of Nebraska (1921–1924), the University of Denver (1925–1928), and the University of Virginia (1931–1933). Dawson also coached the basketball team at Columbia during the 1918–19 season and baseball at Princeton University in 1918 and at Columbia in 1919.

== Early life ==
Dawson was born to Sylvester and Elizabeth Peers Dawson, the 11th of 12 children. Dawson was a 1910 graduate of Princeton University.

== Later life ==
Health problems eventually forced Dawson to leave the coaching field. After retiring from coaching, he became an industrial psychologist and a well known public speaker. Dawson died on August 18, 1965, at a hospital in Omaha, Nebraska.

== Head coaching record ==
=== Football ===
Year	Team	Overall	Conference	Standing
Union Garnet (Independent) (1912–1916)
1912	Union	5–1–2		
1913	Union	3–5		
1914	Union	8–0		
1915	Union	6–1–1		
1916	Union	5–3		
Union:		27–10–3		
Columbia Lions (Independent) (1918–1919)
1918	Columbia	5–1		
1919	Columbia	2–4–3		
Columbia:		7–5–3		
Nebraska Cornhuskers (Missouri Valley Intercollegiate Athletic Association) (1921–1924)
1921	Nebraska	7–1	3–0	1st
1922	Nebraska	7–1	5–0	1st
1923	Nebraska	4–2–2	3–0–2	T–1st
1924	Nebraska	5–3	3–1	2nd
Nebraska:		23–7–2	14–1–2	
Denver Pioneers (Rocky Mountain Conference) (1925–1928)
1925	Denver	1–6	1–6	11th
1926	Denver	4–4	4–4	T–6th
1927	Denver	5–2	5–1	2nd
1928	Denver	4–4–1	3–4–1	7th
Denver:		14–16–1	13–15–1	
Virginia Cavaliers (Southern Conference) (1931–1933)
1931	Virginia	1–7–2	0–5–1	22nd
1932	Virginia	5–4	2–3	T–13th
1933	Virginia	2–6–2	1–3–1	8th
Virginia:		8–17–4	3–11–2	
Total:		79–55–13		
