= Charles J. Hart =

American football coach

Biographical details
- Born: June 27, 1896; Logan, Utah, U.S.
- Died: December 22, 1971 (aged 75); Provo, Utah, U.S.

Coaching career (HC unless noted)
- 1925–1927: BYU

Head coaching record
- Overall: 6–12–2

Charles James "Chic" Hart Sr. (June 27, 1896 – December 22, 1971) was an American football coach. He served as the second head football coach at Brigham Young University (BYU), coaching for three seasons from 1925 to 1927, and compiling a record of 6–12–2. He was a longtime figure in the physical education departments at BYU, remaining at the university until the 1960s.

== Head coaching record ==
| Year | Team | Overall | Conference | Standing | Bowl/playoffs |
|---|---|---|---|---|---|
BYU Cougars (Rocky Mountain Conference) (1925–1927)
| 1925 | BYU | 3–3 | 3–3 | T–6th | |
| 1926 | BYU | 1–5–1 | 1–4–1 | 10th | |
| 1927 | BYU | 2–4–1 | 2–4 | 8th | |
| BYU: | | 6–12–2 | 6–11–1 | | |
| Total: | | 6–12–2 | | | |
