= 1926 Utah Utes football team =

American college football season

1926 Utah Utes football

RMC champion
- Conference: Rocky Mountain Conference
- Record: 7–0 (5–0 RMC)
- Head coach: Ike Armstrong (2nd season)
- Captain: Thornton Morris
- Home stadium: Cummings Field

1926 Rocky Mountain Conference football standings
	Conf.					Overall
Team	W		L		T	W		L		T
Utah $	5	–	0	–	0	7	–	0	–	0
Montana State *	4	–	0	–	0	4	–	2	–	1
Colorado College	5	–	2	–	0	5	–	2	–	0
Colorado Agricultural	5	–	2	–	0	6	–	2	–	1
Utah Agricultural	4	–	1	–	2	5	–	1	–	2
Colorado Teachers	3	–	3	–	0	6	–	4	–	0
Denver	4	–	4	–	0	4	–	4	–	0
Wyoming	1	–	2	–	2	2	–	4	–	2
Colorado	2	–	5	–	1	3	–	5	–	1
BYU	1	–	4	–	1	1	–	5	–	1
Colorado Mines	1	–	5	–	0	1	–	6	–	0
Western State (CO)	0	–	7	–	0	0	–	8	–	0
$ – Conference champion; * – Ineligible for conference title; played less than five conference games

The 1926 Utah Utes football team was an American football team that represented the University of Utah as a member of the Rocky Mountain Conference (RMC) during the 1926 college football season. In their second season under head coach Ike Armstrong, the Utes compiled an overall record of 7–0 with a mark of 5–0 in conference play, won the RMC championship, and outscored opponents by a total of 164 to 23. As a reward for compiling the first perfect season in school history, Utah sailed to Hawaii to play a quasi-bowl game against Hawaii. Knute Rockne was a referee for the game, which Utah won 17–7. Thornton Morris was the team captain.

== Schedule ==
Date	Opponent	Site	Result	Attendance	Source
October 9	South Dakota*	Cummings Field; Salt Lake City, UT	W 13–0		
October 23	at Colorado	Colorado Stadium; Boulder, CO (rivalry)	W 37–3	8,000	
October 30	Colorado Agricultural^{†}	Cummings Field; Salt Lake City, UT	W 10–6	8,000	
November 6	at Denver	DU Stadium; Denver, CO	W 13–0		
November 13	BYU	Cummings Field; Salt Lake City, UT (rivalry)	W 40–7		
November 25	Utah Agricultural	Cummings Field; Salt Lake City, UT (rivalry)	W 34–7		
December 18	at Hawaii*	Honolulu Stadium; Honolulu, Territory of Hawaii	W 17–7		
*Non-conference game; ^{†}Homecoming
