= 1926 Colorado Agricultural Aggies football team =

American college football season

1926 Colorado Agricultural Aggies football
- Conference: Rocky Mountain Conference
- Record: 6–2–1 (5–2 RMC)
- Head coach: Harry W. Hughes (16th season)
- Home stadium: Colorado Field

1926 Rocky Mountain Conference football standings
	Conf.					Overall
Team	W		L		T	W		L		T
Utah $	5	–	0	–	0	7	–	0	–	0
Montana State *	4	–	0	–	0	4	–	2	–	1
Colorado College	5	–	2	–	0	5	–	2	–	0
Colorado Agricultural	5	–	2	–	0	6	–	2	–	1
Utah Agricultural	4	–	1	–	2	5	–	1	–	2
Colorado Teachers	3	–	3	–	0	6	–	4	–	0
Denver	4	–	4	–	0	4	–	4	–	0
Wyoming	1	–	2	–	2	2	–	4	–	2
Colorado	2	–	5	–	1	3	–	5	–	1
BYU	1	–	4	–	1	1	–	5	–	1
Colorado Mines	1	–	5	–	0	1	–	6	–	0
Western State (CO)	0	–	7	–	0	0	–	8	–	0
$ – Conference champion; * – Ineligible for conference title; played less than five conference games

The 1926 Colorado Agricultural Aggies football team represented Colorado Agricultural College (now known as Colorado State University) in the Rocky Mountain Conference (RMC) during the 1926 college football season. In their 16th season under head coach Harry W. Hughes, the Aggies compiled a 6–2–1 record (5–2 against conference opponents), tied for fourth place in the RMC, and outscored opponents by a total of 149 to 44.

== Schedule ==
Date	Opponent	Site	Result	Attendance	Source
October 2	Regis	Colorado Field; Fort Collins, CO	W 39–0		
October 9	Colorado Mines	Colorado Field; Fort Collins, CO	W 53–0		
October 16	at Denver	Denver University Stadium; Denver, CO	W 7–6		
October 23	Colorado College	Colorado Field; Fort Collins, CO	W 19–6		
October 30	at Utah	Cummings Field; Salt Lake City, UT	L 6–10	8,000	
November 6	Utah Agricultural	Colorado Field; Fort Collins, CO	L 0–13		
November 13	at Colorado	Colorado Stadium; Boulder, CO (rivalry)	W 3–0		
November 20	at BYU	Provo, UT	W 19–6		
November 25	at Arizona	Tucson, AZ	T 3–3		
