= 1924 BYU Cougars football team =

American college football season

1924 BYU Cougars football
- Conference: Rocky Mountain Conference
- Record: 2–3–1 (1–3–1 RMC)
- Head coach: Alvin Twitchell (3rd season)

1924 Rocky Mountain Conference football standings
| | Conf. | | | | | Overall |
| Team | W | | L | | T | W | | L | | T |
|---|---|---|---|---|---|---|---|---|---|---|
| Colorado $ | 5 | – | 0 | – | 1 | 8 | – | 1 | – | 1 |
| Utah Agricultural | 3 | – | 2 | – | 1 | 4 | – | 2 | – | 1 |
| Colorado Agricultural | 3 | – | 2 | – | 0 | 4 | – | 2 | – | 0 |
| Denver | 3 | – | 2 | – | 2 | 4 | – | 2 | – | 2 |
| Colorado College | 4 | – | 3 | – | 0 | 5 | – | 3 | – | 0 |
| Montana State | 1 | – | 1 | – | 1 | 5 | – | 1 | – | 1 |
| Utah | 2 | – | 2 | – | 1 | 3 | – | 4 | – | 1 |
| Colorado Mines | 2 | – | 4 | – | 1 | 4 | – | 4 | – | 1 |
| BYU | 1 | – | 3 | – | 1 | 2 | – | 3 | – | 1 |
| Wyoming | 1 | – | 6 | – | 0 | 2 | – | 6 | – | 0 |
$ – Conference champion

The 1924 BYU Cougars football team was an American football team that represented Brigham Young University (BYU) as a member of the Rocky Mountain Conference (RMC) during the 1924 college football season. In their third season under head coach Alvin Twitchell, the Cougars compiled an overall record of 2–3–1 with a mark of 1–3–1 in conference play, finished ninth in the RMC, and were outscored by a total of 61 to 44.

== Schedule ==
| Date | Opponent | Site | Result | Source |
|---|---|---|---|---|
| October 3 | at Colorado College | Washburn Field; Colorado Springs, CO | W 3–0 | |
| October 11 | at Montana State | Gatton Field; Bozeman, MT | L 0–13 | |
| October 25 | at Utah | Cummings Field; Salt Lake City, UT (rivalry) | L 6–35 | |
| November 7 | Utah Agricultural^{†} | Provo, UT (rivalry) | L 0–14 | |
| November 11 | at Western State (CO)* | Gunnison, CO | W 26–0 | |
| November 15 | at Colorado Mines | Brooks Field; Golden, CO | T 0–0 | |
*Non-conference game; ^{†}Homecoming
