= 1929 BYU Cougars football team =

American college football season

1929 BYU Cougars football
- Conference: Rocky Mountain Conference
- Record: 5–3 (4–2 RMC)
- Head coach: G. Ott Romney (2nd season)

1929 Rocky Mountain Conference football standings
	Conf.					Overall
Team	W		L		T	W		L		T
Utah $	6	–	0	–	0	7	–	0	–	0
Colorado	4	–	1	–	1	5	–	1	–	1
Denver	4	–	1	–	1	5	–	1	–	1
Montana State	2	–	1	–	0	6	–	2	–	0
BYU	4	–	2	–	0	5	–	3	–	0
Colorado Teachers	3	–	2	–	0	4	–	3	–	0
Colorado College	4	–	3	–	0	4	–	3	–	0
Colorado Agricultural	4	–	4	–	0	5	–	4	–	0
Utah State	3	–	4	–	0	3	–	4	–	0
Colorado Mines	1	–	5	–	0	2	–	5	–	0
Western State (CO)	0	–	5	–	0	2	–	5	–	0
Wyoming	0	–	7	–	0	1	–	7	–	0
$ – Conference champion

The 1929 BYU Cougars football team was an American football team that represented Brigham Young University (BYU) as a member of the Rocky Mountain Conference (RMC) during the 1929 college football season. In their second season under head coach G. Ott Romney, the Cougars compiled an overall record of 5–3 with a mark of 4–2 against conference opponents, tied for fourth place in the RMC, and outscored opponents by a total of 140 to 115.

== Schedule ==
Date	Time	Opponent	Site	Result	Attendance	Source
September 28		at Nevada*	Mackay Stadium; Reno, NV	W 10–7	> 4,000	
October 5	1:30 p.m.	at Cal Aggies*	Sacramento Stadium; Sacramento, CA	L 0–19	5,000	
October 12		Montana State	Provo, UT	L 12–13		
October 18		vs. Utah State	Lorin Farr Park; Ogden, UT (rivalry)	W 7–6		
October 26		Western State (CO)	Provo, UT	W 33–12		
November 2		at Utah	Ute Stadium; Salt Lake City, UT (rivalry)	L 13–45	8,000	
November 11		Colorado Teachers	Provo, UT	W 25–13	3,000	
November 23		Wyoming	Provo, UT	W 40–0		
*Non-conference game; All times are in Mountain time
