= 1927 BYU Cougars football team =

American college football season

1927 BYU Cougars football
- Conference: Rocky Mountain Conference
- Record: 2–4–1 (2–4 RMC)
- Head coach: Charles J. Hart (3rd season)

1927 Rocky Mountain Conference football standings
	Conf.					Overall
Team	W		L		T	W		L		T
Colorado Agricultural $	7	–	1	–	0	7	–	1	–	0
Denver	5	–	1	–	0	5	–	2	–	0
Montana State	3	–	1	–	0	4	–	4	–	0
Utah	3	–	1	–	1	3	–	3	–	1
Colorado College	5	–	2	–	0	6	–	2	–	0
Colorado	4	–	4	–	0	4	–	5	–	0
Utah Agricultural	3	–	3	–	1	3	–	4	–	1
BYU	2	–	4	–	0	2	–	4	–	1
Colorado Mines	2	–	5	–	0	2	–	5	–	0
Wyoming	1	–	4	–	0	4	–	5	–	0
Colorado Teachers	1	–	6	–	0	2	–	7	–	0
Western State (CO)	1	–	5	–	0	1	–	6	–	0
$ – Conference champion

The 1927 BYU Cougars football team was an American football team that represented Brigham Young University (BYU) as a member of the Rocky Mountain Conference (RMC) during the 1927 college football season. In their third and final season under head coach Charles J. Hart, the Cougars compiled an overall record of 2–4–1 with a mark of 2–4 in conference play, finished eighth in the RMC, and were outscored by a total of 118 to 105.

== Schedule ==
Date	Time	Opponent	Site	Result	Source
October 8		at Colorado Agricultural	Colorado Field; Fort Collins, CO	L 0–29	
October 15	1:00 p.m.	at Cal Aggies*	Moreing Field; Sacramento, CA	T 0–0	
October 22		Colorado Teachers^{†}	Provo, UT	L 7–21	
October 29		at Utah Agricultural	Aggie Stadium; Logan, UT (rivalry)	L 0–22	
November 5		Western State (CO)	Provo, UT	W 60–7	
November 12		Utah	Provo, UT (rivalry)	L 0–20	
November 19		Colorado Mines	Provo, UT	W 38–19	
*Non-conference game; ^{†}Homecoming; All times are in Mountain time
