= 1927 South Dakota State Jackrabbits football team =

American college football season

1927 South Dakota State Jackrabbits football
- Conference: North Central Conference
- Record: 5–3–1 (2–2 NCC)
- Head coach: Charles A. West (9th season)

1927 North Central Conference football standings
	Conf.					Overall
Team	W		L		T	W		L		T
South Dakota +	5	–	0	–	0	7	–	2	–	0
Creighton +	2	–	0	–	0	6	–	1	–	1
South Dakota State	2	–	2	–	0	5	–	3	–	0
North Dakota	2	–	2	–	0	4	–	4	–	0
Morningside	1	–	3	–	0	3	–	5	–	0
North Dakota Agricultural	1	–	3	–	0	3	–	5	–	0
Nebraska Wesleyan	0	–	3	–	0	0	–	8	–	1
+ – Conference co-champions

The 1927 South Dakota State Jackrabbits football team was an American football team that represented South Dakota State College in the North Central Conference (NCC) during the 1927 college football season. In its ninth season under head coach Charles A. West, the team compiled a 5–3–1 record and outscored opponents by a total of 189 to 89.

== Schedule ==
Date	Opponent	Site	Result	Attendance	Source
	Columbus (SD)*		T 7–7		
October 1	Huron*	Brookings, SD	W 67–2		
October 8	Des Moines*	Brookings, SD	W 15–0		
October 15	at North Dakota State	Dacotah Field; Fargo, ND (rivalry)	W 33–0		
October 29	at South Dakota	Vermillion, SD (Dakota Day, rivalry)	L 12–16	6,000	
November 5	Morningside	Brookings, SD	W 44–7		
November 12	at Creighton	Creighton Stadium; Omaha, NE	L 0–14	5,000	
November 19	at Regis*	Denver, CO	W 10–7		
November 24	at Detroit*	Dinan Field; Detroit, MI	L 0–38		
*Non-conference game
