= 1925 BYU Cougars football team =

American college football season

1925 BYU Cougars football
- Conference: Rocky Mountain Conference
- Record: 3–3 (3–3 RMC)
- Head coach: Charles J. Hart (1st season)

1925 Rocky Mountain Conference football standings
	Conf.					Overall
Team	W		L		T	W		L		T
Colorado Agricultural $	8	–	0	–	0	9	–	1	–	0
Utah Agricultural	5	–	1	–	0	6	–	1	–	0
Utah	5	–	1	–	0	6	–	2	–	0
Colorado	5	–	2	–	0	6	–	3	–	0
Wyoming	4	–	3	–	0	6	–	3	–	0
BYU	3	–	3	–	0	3	–	3	–	0
Colorado College	4	–	4	–	0	5	–	4	–	1
Western State (CO)	2	–	4	–	0	3	–	4	–	0
Colorado Mines	2	–	6	–	0	2	–	7	–	0
Montana State	1	–	4	–	0	6	–	5	–	0
Denver	1	–	6	–	0	1	–	6	–	0
Colorado Teachers	0	–	6	–	0	2	–	6	–	1
$ – Conference champion

The 1925 BYU Cougars football team was an American football team that represented Brigham Young University (BYU) as a member of the Rocky Mountain Conference (RMC) during the 1925 college football season. In its first season under head coach Charles J. Hart, the Cougars compiled an overall record of 3–3 with an identical mark in conference play, tied for sixth place in the RMC, and were outscored by a total of 81 to 69.

== Schedule ==
Date	Opponent	Site	Result	Source
October 10	at Colorado Agricultural	Colorado Field; Fort Collins, CO	L 0–21	
October 17	Colorado College^{†}	Provo, UT	W 7–6	
October 24	at Utah Agricultural	Adams Field; Logan, UT (rivalry)	L 0–14	
October 31	Utah	Provo, UT (rivalry)	L 0–27	
November 7	Western State (CO)	Provo, UT	W 39–7	
November 21	Montana State	Provo, UT	W 7–16	
^{†}Homecoming
