= 1921 Utah Utes football team =

American college football season

1921 Utah Utes football
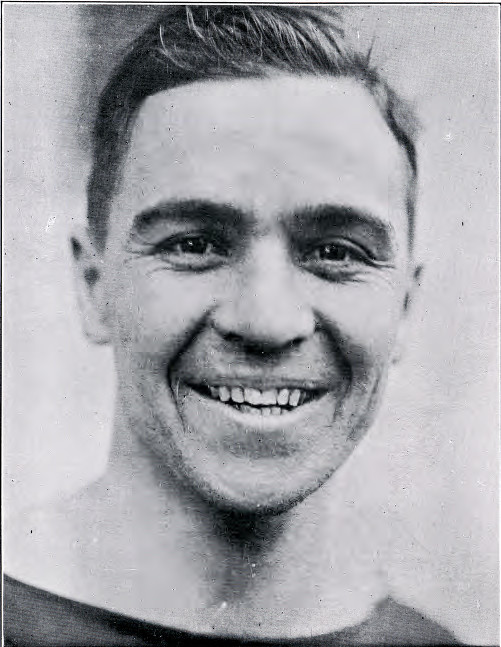
- Coach Fitzpatrick in 1921
- Conference: Rocky Mountain Conference
- Record: 3–2–1 (2–1–1 RMC)
- Head coach: Thomas M. Fitzpatrick (3rd season)
- Home stadium: Cummings Field

1921 Rocky Mountain Conference football standings
| | Conf. | | | | | Overall |
| Team | W | | L | | T | W | | L | | T |
|---|---|---|---|---|---|---|---|---|---|---|
| Utah Agricultural $ | 4 | – | 0 | – | 0 | 7 | – | 1 | – | 0 |
| Colorado | 4 | – | 0 | – | 1 | 4 | – | 1 | – | 1 |
| Utah | 2 | – | 1 | – | 1 | 3 | – | 2 | – | 1 |
| Denver | 2 | – | 2 | – | 1 | 4 | – | 2 | – | 1 |
| Colorado Agricultural | 2 | – | 2 | – | 1 | 2 | – | 3 | – | 1 |
| Colorado College | 2 | – | 4 | – | 0 | 4 | – | 4 | – | 0 |
| Wyoming | 1 | – | 3 | – | 2 | 1 | – | 4 | – | 2 |
| Colorado Mines | 1 | – | 5 | – | 0 | 1 | – | 5 | – | 0 |
| Montana State | 0 | – | 1 | – | 0 | 2 | – | 4 | – | 0 |
$ – Conference champion

The 1921 Utah Utes football team represented the University of Utah as a member of the Rocky Mountain Conference (RMC) during the 1921 college football season. Led by third-year head coach Thomas M. Fitzpatrick, the Utes compiled an overall record of 3–2–1 with a mark of 2–1–1 in conference play, placing third in the RMC. On November 12, Utah hosted its first homecoming game, which ended in a scoreless tie with Colorado.

== Schedule ==
| Date | Opponent | Site | Result | Attendance | Source |
|---|---|---|---|---|---|
| October 15 | Wyoming | Cummings Field; Salt Lake City, UT | W 14–3 | | |
| October 22 | at Colorado College | Washburn Field; Colorado Springs, CO | W 14–3 | | |
| October 29 | Idaho* | Cummings Field; Salt Lake City, UT | W 17–7 | | |
| November 5 | at Nevada* | Mackay Field; Reno, NV | L 7–28 | | |
| November 12 | Colorado^{†} | Cummings Field; Salt Lake City, UT (rivalry) | T 0–0 | | |
| November 24 | Utah Agricultural | Cummings Field; Salt Lake City, UT (rivalry) | L 3–14 | 10,000 | |
*Non-conference game; ^{†}Homecoming
