= 1924 Wyoming Cowboys football team =

American college football season

1924 Wyoming Cowboys football
- Conference: Rocky Mountain Conference
- Record: 2–6 (1–6 RMC)
- Head coach: William Henry Dietz (1st season)
- Captain: George Mabee
- Home stadium: Campus athletic grounds

1924 Rocky Mountain Conference football standings
	Conf.					Overall
Team	W		L		T	W		L		T
Colorado $	5	–	0	–	1	8	–	1	–	1
Utah Agricultural	3	–	2	–	1	4	–	2	–	1
Colorado Agricultural	3	–	2	–	0	4	–	2	–	0
Denver	3	–	2	–	2	4	–	2	–	2
Colorado College	4	–	3	–	0	5	–	3	–	0
Montana State	1	–	1	–	1	5	–	1	–	1
Utah	2	–	2	–	1	3	–	4	–	1
Colorado Mines	2	–	4	–	1	4	–	4	–	1
BYU	1	–	3	–	1	2	–	3	–	1
Wyoming	1	–	6	–	0	2	–	6	–	0
$ – Conference champion

The 1924 Wyoming Cowboys football team was an American football team that represented the University of Wyoming as a member of the Rocky Mountain Conference (RMC) during the 1924 college football season. In their first season under head coach William Henry Dietz, the Cowboys compiled a 2–6 record (1–6 against conference opponents), finished last out of ten teams in the RMC, and were outscored by a total of 140 to 59. George Mabee was the team captain.

== Schedule ==
Date	Opponent	Site	Result	Source
October 11	at Denver	Denver, CO	L 0–7	
October 18	Colorado Teachers*	Campus athletic grounds; Laramie, WY	W 33–8	
October 25	Colorado	Campus athletic grounds; Laramie, WY	L 0–21	
November 1	at Colorado Mines	Brooks Field; Golden, CO	L 3–6	
November 5	Montana State	Campus athletic grounds; Laramie, WY	W 18–17	
November 11	at Utah Agricultural	Adams Field; Logan, UT (rivalry)	L 2–25	
November 15	at Utah	Cummings Field; Salt Lake City, UT	L 0–28	
November 22	at Colorado College	Washburn Field; Colorado Springs, CO	L 3–28	
*Non-conference game
