= 1928 Utah Utes football team =

American college football season

1928 Utah Utes football

RMC champion
- Conference: Rocky Mountain Conference
- Record: 5–0–2 (4–0–1 RMC)
- Head coach: Ike Armstrong (4th season)
- Captain: Alton Carman
- Home stadium: Ute Stadium

1928 Rocky Mountain Conference football standings
	Conf.					Overall
Team	W		L		T	W		L		T
Utah $	4	–	0	–	1	5	–	0	–	2
Colorado	5	–	1	–	0	5	–	1	–	0
Colorado Agricultural	6	–	2	–	0	6	–	2	–	0
Utah Agricultural	4	–	2	–	1	5	–	3	–	1
Colorado College	5	–	3	–	0	5	–	3	–	0
Montana State	3	–	2	–	0	4	–	4	–	1
Denver	3	–	4	–	1	4	–	4	–	1
Colorado Teachers	3	–	4	–	0	4	–	4	–	0
Colorado Mines	2	–	4	–	0	2	–	5	–	0
BYU	1	–	3	–	1	3	–	3	–	1
Wyoming	0	–	5	–	0	2	–	7	–	0
Western State (CO)	0	–	6	–	0	0	–	7	–	0
$ – Conference champion

The 1928 Utah Utes football team represented the University of Utah as a member of the Rocky Mountain Conference (RMC) during the 1928 college football season. Led by fourth-year head coach Ike Armstrong, the Utes compiled an overall record of 5–0–2 with a mark of 4–0–1 in conference playing, winning the first of six consecutive RMC titles.

== Schedule ==
Date	Opponent	Site	Result	Source
October 6	at Nevada*	Mackay Field; Reno, NV	W 32–7	
October 20	Colorado Agricultural	Ute Stadium; Salt Lake City, UT	W 6–0	
October 27	at Colorado	Colorado Stadium; Boulder, CO (rivalry)	W 25–6	
November 3	Colorado College^{†}	Ute Stadium; Salt Lake City, UT	W 27–21	
November 10	at Creighton*	Creighton Stadium; Omaha, NE	T 7–7	
November 17	BYU	Ute Stadium; Salt Lake City, UTT (rivalry)	T 0–0	
November 29	Utah Agricultural	Ute Stadium; Salt Lake City, UT (rivalry)	W 20–0	
*Non-conference game; ^{†}Homecoming
