= 1924 Colorado Agricultural Aggies football team =

American college football season

1924 Colorado Agricultural Aggies football
- Conference: Rocky Mountain Conference
- Record: 4–2 (3–2 RMC)
- Head coach: Harry W. Hughes (14th season)
- Home stadium: Colorado Field

1924 Rocky Mountain Conference football standings
	Conf.					Overall
Team	W		L		T	W		L		T
Colorado $	5	–	0	–	1	8	–	1	–	1
Utah Agricultural	3	–	2	–	1	4	–	2	–	1
Colorado Agricultural	3	–	2	–	0	4	–	2	–	0
Denver	3	–	2	–	2	4	–	2	–	2
Colorado College	4	–	3	–	0	5	–	3	–	0
Montana State	1	–	1	–	1	5	–	1	–	1
Utah	2	–	2	–	1	3	–	4	–	1
Colorado Mines	2	–	4	–	1	4	–	4	–	1
BYU	1	–	3	–	1	2	–	3	–	1
Wyoming	1	–	6	–	0	2	–	6	–	0
$ – Conference champion

The 1924 Colorado Agricultural Aggies football team represented Colorado Agricultural College—now known as Colorado State University—as a member of the Rocky Mountain Conference (RMC) during the 1924 college football season. In their 14th season under head coach Harry W. Hughes, the Aggies compiled an overall record of 4–2 with a mark of 3–2 against conference opponents, finished in a thee-way tie for second play in the RMC, and outscored all opponents by a total of 81 to 63.

== Schedule ==
Date	Opponent	Site	Result	Source
October 18	at Colorado Mines	Brooks Field; Golden, CO	W 17–0	
October 25	Utah Agricultural	Colorado Field; Fort Collins, CO	W 17–13	
November 8	Colorado College	Colorado Field; Fort Collins, CO	L 6–7	
November 14	at Colorado Teachers*	Jackson Field; Greeley, CO	W 22–7	
November 22	at Colorado	Colorado Stadium; Boulder, CO (rivalry)	L 0–36	
November 27	at Denver	Broadway Field; Denver, CO	W 19–0	
*Non-conference game
