= 1929 Colorado Silver and Gold football team =

American college football season

1929 Colorado Silver and Gold football
- Conference: Rocky Mountain Conference
- Record: 5–1–1 (4–1–1 RMC)
- Head coach: Myron E. Witham (10th season)
- Captain: Bill Smith
- Home stadium: Colorado Stadium

1929 Rocky Mountain Conference football standings
	Conf.					Overall
Team	W		L		T	W		L		T
Utah $	6	–	0	–	0	7	–	0	–	0
Colorado	4	–	1	–	1	5	–	1	–	1
Denver	4	–	1	–	1	5	–	1	–	1
Montana State	2	–	1	–	0	6	–	2	–	0
BYU	4	–	2	–	0	5	–	3	–	0
Colorado Teachers	3	–	2	–	0	4	–	3	–	0
Colorado College	4	–	3	–	0	4	–	3	–	0
Colorado Agricultural	4	–	4	–	0	5	–	4	–	0
Utah State	3	–	4	–	0	3	–	4	–	0
Colorado Mines	1	–	5	–	0	2	–	5	–	0
Western State (CO)	0	–	5	–	0	2	–	5	–	0
Wyoming	0	–	7	–	0	1	–	7	–	0
$ – Conference champion

The 1929 Colorado Silver and Gold football team was an American football team that represented the University of Colorado as a member of the Rocky Mountain Conference (RMC) during the 1929 college football season. Led by tenth-year head coach Myron E. Witham, Colorado compiled an overall record of 5–1–1 with a mark of 4–1–1 in conference play, tying for second place in the RMC.

== Schedule ==
Date	Opponent	Site	Result	Attendance	Source
October 5	Regis (CO)*	Colorado Stadium; Boulder, CO	W 27–13	5,000	
October 12	Colorado Teachers	Colorado Stadium; Boulder, CO	W 19–0	8,000	
October 19	at Utah	Ute Stadium; Salt Lake City, UT (rivalry)	L 0–40	13,000	
November 2	Denver^{†}	Colorado Stadium; Boulder, CO	T 0–0		
November 9	at Colorado Mines	Brooks Field; Golden, CO	W 6–0		
November 16	at Colorado Agricultural	Colorado Field; Fort Collins, CO (rivalry)	W 6–0		
November 23	Colorado College	Colorado Stadium; Boulder, CO	W 13–7		
*Non-conference game; ^{†}Homecoming
