= 1929 Montana State Bobcats football team =

American college football season

1929 Montana State Bobcats football
- Conference: Rocky Mountain Conference
- Record: 6–2 (2–1 RMC)
- Head coach: Schubert R. Dyche (2nd season)
- Home stadium: Gatton Field

1929 Rocky Mountain Conference football standings
| | Conf. | | | | | Overall |
| Team | W | | L | | T | W | | L | | T |
|---|---|---|---|---|---|---|---|---|---|---|
| Utah $ | 6 | – | 0 | – | 0 | 7 | – | 0 | – | 0 |
| Colorado | 4 | – | 1 | – | 1 | 5 | – | 1 | – | 1 |
| Denver | 4 | – | 1 | – | 1 | 5 | – | 1 | – | 1 |
| Montana State | 2 | – | 1 | – | 0 | 6 | – | 2 | – | 0 |
| BYU | 4 | – | 2 | – | 0 | 5 | – | 3 | – | 0 |
| Colorado Teachers | 3 | – | 2 | – | 0 | 4 | – | 3 | – | 0 |
| Colorado College | 4 | – | 3 | – | 0 | 4 | – | 3 | – | 0 |
| Colorado Agricultural | 4 | – | 4 | – | 0 | 5 | – | 4 | – | 0 |
| Utah State | 3 | – | 4 | – | 0 | 3 | – | 4 | – | 0 |
| Colorado Mines | 1 | – | 5 | – | 0 | 2 | – | 5 | – | 0 |
| Western State (CO) | 0 | – | 5 | – | 0 | 2 | – | 5 | – | 0 |
| Wyoming | 0 | – | 7 | – | 0 | 1 | – | 7 | – | 0 |
$ – Conference champion

The 1929 Montana State Bobcats football team was an American football team that represented Montana State College (later renamed Montana State University) in the Rocky Mountain Conference (RMC) during the 1929 college football season. In its second season under head coach Schubert R. Dyche, the team compiled a 6–2 record (2–1 against RMC opponents) and outscored opponents by a total of 84 to 72.

== Schedule ==
| Date | Opponent | Site | Result | Attendance | Source |
|---|---|---|---|---|---|
| September 21 | Centerville (Butte)* | Gatton Field; Bozeman, MT | W 25–0 | | |
| September 28 | at Idaho* | MacLean Field; Moscow, ID | L 6–39 | | |
| October 5 | Utah State | Gatton Field; Bozeman, MT | L 0–9 | | |
| October 12 | at BYU | Provo, UT | W 13–12 | | |
| October 26 | vs. Montana* | Clark Park; Butte, MT (rivalry) | W 14–12 | 7,000 | |
| November 11 | vs. Wyoming | Sheridan, WY | W 13–0 | | |
| November 22 | North Dakota Agricultural* | Gatton Field; Bozeman, MT | W 6–0 | | |
| November 28 | vs. Mount St. Charles* | Montana Power Park; Great Falls, MT | W 7–0 | 3,000 | |
*Non-conference game
