= 1928 Colorado College Tigers football team =

American college football season

1928 Colorado College Tigers football
- Conference: Rocky Mountain Conference
- Record: 5–3 (5–3 RMC)
- Head coach: William T. Van de Graaff (3rd season)
- Home stadium: Washburn Field

1928 Rocky Mountain Conference football standings
	Conf.					Overall
Team	W		L		T	W		L		T
Utah $	4	–	0	–	1	5	–	0	–	2
Colorado	5	–	1	–	0	5	–	1	–	0
Colorado Agricultural	6	–	2	–	0	6	–	2	–	0
Utah Agricultural	4	–	2	–	1	5	–	3	–	1
Colorado College	5	–	3	–	0	5	–	3	–	0
Montana State	3	–	2	–	0	4	–	4	–	1
Denver	3	–	4	–	1	4	–	4	–	1
Colorado Teachers	3	–	4	–	0	4	–	4	–	0
Colorado Mines	2	–	4	–	0	2	–	5	–	0
BYU	1	–	3	–	1	3	–	3	–	1
Wyoming	0	–	5	–	0	2	–	7	–	0
Western State (CO)	0	–	6	–	0	0	–	7	–	0
$ – Conference champion

The 1928 Colorado College Tigers football team represented Colorado College as a member of the Rocky Mountain Conference (RMC) during the 1928 college football season. In its third year under head coach William T. Van de Graaff, the team compiled an overall record of 5–3 with an identical mark in conference play, placing fifth in the RMC. Dutch Clark rushed for 1,349 yards on 135 carries and scored 103 of CC's 203 points. He became the first All-American football player from any of Colorado's colleges and universities.

== Schedule ==
Date	Opponent	Site	Result	Source
October 6	Montana State	Washburn Field; Colorado Springs, CO	W 32–14	
October 13	Western State (CO)	Washburn Field; Colorado Springs, CO	W 24–6	
October 20	at Denver	DU Stadium; Denver, CO	W 18–13	
November 3	at Utah	Ute Stadium; Salt Lake City, UT	L 21–27	
November 10	at Colorado Mines	Brooks Field; Golden, CO	W 28–6	
November 17	Colorado	Washburn Field; Colorado Springs, CO	L 19–24	
November 24	Wyoming	Washburn Field; Colorado Springs, CO	W 48–25	
December 1	at Colorado Agricultural	Colorado Field; Fort Collins, CO	L 13–35	
