= 1929 Wyoming Cowboys football team =

American college football season

1929 Wyoming Cowboys football
- Conference: Rocky Mountain Conference
- Record: 1–7 (0–7 RMC)
- Head coach: George McLaren (3rd season)
- Captain: None
- Home stadium: Campus athletic grounds

1929 Rocky Mountain Conference football standings
	Conf.					Overall
Team	W		L		T	W		L		T
Utah $	6	–	0	–	0	7	–	0	–	0
Colorado	4	–	1	–	1	5	–	1	–	1
Denver	4	–	1	–	1	5	–	1	–	1
Montana State	2	–	1	–	0	6	–	2	–	0
BYU	4	–	2	–	0	5	–	3	–	0
Colorado Teachers	3	–	2	–	0	4	–	3	–	0
Colorado College	4	–	3	–	0	4	–	3	–	0
Colorado Agricultural	4	–	4	–	0	5	–	4	–	0
Utah State	3	–	4	–	0	3	–	4	–	0
Colorado Mines	1	–	5	–	0	2	–	5	–	0
Western State (CO)	0	–	5	–	0	2	–	5	–	0
Wyoming	0	–	7	–	0	1	–	7	–	0
$ – Conference champion

The 1929 Wyoming Cowboys football team was an American football team that represented the University of Wyoming as a member of the Rocky Mountain Conference during the 1929 college football season. In their third season under head coach George McLaren, the Cowboys compiled a 1–7 record (0–7 against conference opponents), finished last out of 12 teams in the RMC, and were outscored by a total of 160 to 33.

== Schedule ==
Date	Opponent	Site	Result	Source
September 28	Spearfish*	Campus athletic grounds; Laramie, WY	W 13–6	
October 4	at Colorado Agricultural	Colorado Field; Fort Collins, CO (rivalry)	L 7–20	
October 12	at Denver	Denver University Stadium; Denver, CO	L 6–19	
October 26	Utah State	Campus athletic grounds; Laramie, WY (rivalry)	L 7–12	
November 2	at Colorado Teachers	Jackson Field; Greeley, CO	L 0–6	
November 11	vs. Montana State	Sheridan, WY	L 0–13	
November 16	Utah	Campus athletic grounds; Laramie, WY	L 0–44	
November 23	at BYU	Provo, UT	L 0–40	
*Non-conference game
