= 1929 Colorado Agricultural Aggies football team =

American college football season

1929 Colorado Agricultural Aggies football
- Conference: Rocky Mountain Conference
- Record: 5–4 (4–4 RMC)
- Head coach: Harry W. Hughes (19th season)
- Home stadium: Colorado Field

1929 Rocky Mountain Conference football standings
	Conf.					Overall
Team	W		L		T	W		L		T
Utah $	6	–	0	–	0	7	–	0	–	0
Colorado	4	–	1	–	1	5	–	1	–	1
Denver	4	–	1	–	1	5	–	1	–	1
Montana State	2	–	1	–	0	6	–	2	–	0
BYU	4	–	2	–	0	5	–	3	–	0
Colorado Teachers	3	–	2	–	0	4	–	3	–	0
Colorado College	4	–	3	–	0	4	–	3	–	0
Colorado Agricultural	4	–	4	–	0	5	–	4	–	0
Utah State	3	–	4	–	0	3	–	4	–	0
Colorado Mines	1	–	5	–	0	2	–	5	–	0
Western State (CO)	0	–	5	–	0	2	–	5	–	0
Wyoming	0	–	7	–	0	1	–	7	–	0
$ – Conference champion

The 1929 Colorado Agricultural Aggies football team represented Colorado Agricultural College (now known as Colorado State University) in the Rocky Mountain Conference (RMC) during the 1929 college football season. In their 19th season under head coach Harry W. Hughes, the Aggies compiled a 5–4 record (4–4 against conference opponents), finished eighth in the RMC, and outscored all opponents by a total of 117 to 87.

== Schedule ==
Date	Opponent	Site	Result	Attendance	Source
September 28	at Regis*	Denver, CO	W 14–0		
October 4	Wyoming	Colorado Field; Fort Collins, CO (rivalry)	W 20–7		
October 12	at Colorado College	Washburn Field; Colorado Springs, CO	L 13–14		
October 19	at Colorado Mines	Brooks Field; Golden, CO	W 12–0		
October 26	Utah	Colorado Field; Fort Collins, CO	L 0–21	10,000	
November 2	Western State (CO)	Colorado Field; Fort Collins, CO	W 45–14		
November 9	at Utah State	Aggie Stadium; Logan, UT	W 7–6		
November 16	Colorado	Colorado Field; Fort Collins, CO (rivalry)	L 0–6		
November 29	at Denver	DU Stadium; Denver, CO	L 6–19	20,000	
*Non-conference game
