= 1924 Montana State Bobcats football team =

American college football season

1924 Montana State Bobcats football
- Conference: Rocky Mountain Conference
- Record: 5–1–1 (1–1–1 RMC)
- Head coach: G. Ott Romney (3rd season)
- Home stadium: Gatton Field

1924 Rocky Mountain Conference football standings
	Conf.					Overall
Team	W		L		T	W		L		T
Colorado $	5	–	0	–	1	8	–	1	–	1
Utah Agricultural	3	–	2	–	1	4	–	2	–	1
Colorado Agricultural	3	–	2	–	0	4	–	2	–	0
Denver	3	–	2	–	2	4	–	2	–	2
Colorado College	4	–	3	–	0	5	–	3	–	0
Montana State	1	–	1	–	1	5	–	1	–	1
Utah	2	–	2	–	1	3	–	4	–	1
Colorado Mines	2	–	4	–	1	4	–	4	–	1
BYU	1	–	3	–	1	2	–	3	–	1
Wyoming	1	–	6	–	0	2	–	6	–	0
$ – Conference champion

The 1924 Montana State Bobcats football team was an American football team that represented Montana State College—now known as Montana State University—as a member of the Rocky Mountain Conference (RMC) during the 1924 college football season. In its third season under head coach G. Ott Romney, the team compiled an overall record of 5–1–1 with a mark of 1–1–1 against RMC opponents, tied for sixth place in the conference, shut out six of seven opponents, and outscored all opponents by a total of 274 to 18.

== Schedule ==
Date	Opponent	Site	Result	Attendance	Source
October 11	BYU	Gatton Field; Bozeman, MT	W 13–0		
October 18	Centerville (Butte)*	Gatton Field; Bozeman, MT	W 31–0		
October 25	Colorado Teachers*	Gatton Field; Bozeman, MT	W 59–0		
November 5	at Wyoming	Campus athletic grounds; Laramie, WY	L 17–18		
November 8	at Denver	Denver, CO	T 0–0	6,000	
November 15	at Intermountain Union*	Helena, MT	W 68–0		
November 22	at Montana Mines*	Clark Park; Butte, MT	W 86–0		
*Non-conference game
