= 1925 Utah Agricultural Aggies football team =

American college football season

1925 Utah Agricultural Aggies football
- Conference: Rocky Mountain Conference
- Record: 6–1 (5–1 RMC)
- Head coach: Dick Romney (7th season)
- Home stadium: Adams Field

1925 Rocky Mountain Conference football standings
	Conf.					Overall
Team	W		L		T	W		L		T
Colorado Agricultural $	8	–	0	–	0	9	–	1	–	0
Utah Agricultural	5	–	1	–	0	6	–	1	–	0
Utah	5	–	1	–	0	6	–	2	–	0
Colorado	5	–	2	–	0	6	–	3	–	0
Wyoming	4	–	3	–	0	6	–	3	–	0
BYU	3	–	3	–	0	3	–	3	–	0
Colorado College	4	–	4	–	0	5	–	4	–	1
Western State (CO)	2	–	4	–	0	3	–	4	–	0
Colorado Mines	2	–	6	–	0	2	–	7	–	0
Montana State	1	–	4	–	0	6	–	5	–	0
Denver	1	–	6	–	0	1	–	6	–	0
Colorado Teachers	0	–	6	–	0	2	–	6	–	1
$ – Conference champion

The 1925 Utah State Aggies football team was an American football team that represented Utah State Agricultural College in the Rocky Mountain Conference (RMC) during the 1925 college football season. In their seventh season under head coach Dick Romney, the Aggies compiled a 6–1 record (5–1 against RMC opponents), finished in a tie for second place in the RMC, and outscored all opponents by a total of 111 to 39.

== Schedule ==
Date	Opponent	Site	Result	Attendance	Source
October 10	at Denver	Denver, CO	W 13–0		
October 24	BYU	Adams Field; Logan, UT (rivalry)	W 14–0		
October 31	vs. Colorado Agricultural	Ogden, UT	L 0–13	7,000	
November 5	Wyoming	Adams Field; Logan, UT (rivalry)	W 26–13		
November 14	Montana State	Adams Field; Logan, UT	W 10–7	5,500	
November 21	at Montana Mines*	Butte, MT	W 38–0		
November 26	at Utah	Cummings Field; Salt Lake City, UT (rivalry)	W 10–6		
*Non-conference game
