= 1928 Colorado Agricultural Aggies football team =

American college football season

1928 Colorado Agricultural Aggies football
- Conference: Rocky Mountain Conference
- Record: 6–2 (6–2 RMC)
- Head coach: Harry W. Hughes (18th season)
- Home stadium: Colorado Field

1928 Rocky Mountain Conference football standings
	Conf.					Overall
Team	W		L		T	W		L		T
Utah $	4	–	0	–	1	5	–	0	–	2
Colorado	5	–	1	–	0	5	–	1	–	0
Colorado Agricultural	6	–	2	–	0	6	–	2	–	0
Utah Agricultural	4	–	2	–	1	5	–	3	–	1
Colorado College	5	–	3	–	0	5	–	3	–	0
Montana State	3	–	2	–	0	4	–	4	–	1
Denver	3	–	4	–	1	4	–	4	–	1
Colorado Teachers	3	–	4	–	0	4	–	4	–	0
Colorado Mines	2	–	4	–	0	2	–	5	–	0
BYU	1	–	3	–	1	3	–	3	–	1
Wyoming	0	–	5	–	0	2	–	7	–	0
Western State (CO)	0	–	6	–	0	0	–	7	–	0
$ – Conference champion

The 1928 Colorado Agricultural Aggies football team represented Colorado Agricultural College (now known as Colorado State University) in the Rocky Mountain Conference (RMC) during the 1928 college football season. In their 18th season under head coach Harry W. Hughes, the Aggies compiled a 6–2 record, finished third in the RMC, and outscored all opponents by a total of 151 to 70.

Four Colorado Agricultural players received all-conference honors in 1928: center Carlyle Vickers, end Frank Prince, guard Ed Graves, and end Dan Beattie.

== Schedule ==
Date	Opponent	Site	Result	Source
October 6	Colorado Teachers	Colorado Field; Fort Collins, CO	W 26–6	
October 13	BYU	Colorado Field; Fort Collins, CO	W 15–6	
October 20	at Utah	Ute Stadium; Salt Lake City, UT	L 0–6	
November 3	Utah Agricultural	Colorado Field; Fort Collins, CO	W 7–6	
November 10	at Colorado	Colorado Stadium; Boulder, CO (rivalry)	L 7–13	
November 17	at Denver	Denver University Stadium; Denver, CO	W 15–0	
November 24	Colorado Mines	Colorado Field; Fort Collins, CO	W 46–20	
December 1	Colorado College	Colorado Field; Fort Collins, CO	W 35–13	
