= 1924 Colorado Silver and Gold football team =

American college football season

1924 Colorado Silver and Gold football

RMC champion

Poi Bowl, L 0–13 vs. Hawaii
- Conference: Rocky Mountain Conference
- Record: 8–1–1 (5–0–1 RMC)
- Head coach: Myron E. Witham (5th season)
- Captain: Fred Hartshorn
- Home stadium: Gamble Field, Colorado Stadium

1924 Rocky Mountain Conference football standings
	Conf.					Overall
Team	W		L		T	W		L		T
Colorado $	5	–	0	–	1	8	–	1	–	1
Utah Agricultural	3	–	2	–	1	4	–	2	–	1
Colorado Agricultural	3	–	2	–	0	4	–	2	–	0
Denver	3	–	2	–	2	4	–	2	–	2
Colorado College	4	–	3	–	0	5	–	3	–	0
Montana State	1	–	1	–	1	5	–	1	–	1
Utah	2	–	2	–	1	3	–	4	–	1
Colorado Mines	2	–	4	–	1	4	–	4	–	1
BYU	1	–	3	–	1	2	–	3	–	1
Wyoming	1	–	6	–	0	2	–	6	–	0
$ – Conference champion

The 1924 Colorado Silver and Gold football team was an American football team that represented the University of Colorado as a member of the Rocky Mountain Conference (RMC) during the 1924 college football season. In its fifth year under head coach Myron E. Witham, the team compiled an 8–1–1 record (5–0–1 against RMC opponents), won the conference championship, was not scored upon during the regular season, lost a postseason game to undefeated Hawaii in the Poi Bowl, and outscored all opponents by a total of 237 to 13. The team's string of nine consecutive shutouts remains the longest in program history.

On October 11, 1924, the team played its first game at the newly-constructed Colorado Stadium. The Silver and Gold defeated Regis by a 39–0 score in that game.

The team's leading players included Hatfield Chilson and George Wittemeyer. On October 18, 1924, Chilson completed a pass to Wittemeyer that was good for 70 yards. It remained the longest passing play in program history until 1985.

== Schedule ==
Date	Opponent	Site	Result	Attendance	Source
October 4	Western State (CO)*	Gamble Field; Boulder, CO	W 31–0		
October 11	Regis*	Colorado Stadium; Boulder, CO	W 39–0		
October 18	at Colorado College	Washburn Field; Colorado Springs, CO	W 26–0		
October 25	at Wyoming	Campus athletic grounds; Laramie, WY	W 21–0		
November 1	Utah^{†}	Colorado Stadium; Boulder, CO (rivalry)	W 3–0		
November 8	Colorado Mines	Colorado Stadium; Boulder, CO	W 38–0		
November 15	at Denver	Broadway Field; Denver, CO	T 0–0		
November 22	Colorado Agricultural	Colorado Stadium; Boulder, CO (rivalry)	W 36–0		
December 25	at Pearl Harbor Navy*	Moiliili Field; Honolulu, Territory of Hawaii	W 43–0		
January 1, 1925	at Hawaii*	Moiliili Field; Honolulu, Territory of Hawaii (Poi Bowl)	L 0–13	10,000	
*Non-conference game; ^{†}Homecoming
