= 1926 Colorado Silver and Gold football team =

American college football season

1926 Colorado Silver and Gold football
- Conference: Rocky Mountain Conference
- Record: 3–5–1 (2–5–1 RMC)
- Head coach: Myron E. Witham (7th season)
- Captain: Bill Bohn
- Home stadium: Colorado Stadium

1926 Rocky Mountain Conference football standings
| | Conf. | | | | | Overall |
| Team | W | | L | | T | W | | L | | T |
|---|---|---|---|---|---|---|---|---|---|---|
| Utah $ | 5 | – | 0 | – | 0 | 7 | – | 0 | – | 0 |
| Montana State | 4 | – | 0 | – | 0 | 4 | – | 2 | – | 1 |
| Colorado College | 5 | – | 2 | – | 0 | 5 | – | 2 | – | 0 |
| Colorado Agricultural | 5 | – | 2 | – | 0 | 6 | – | 2 | – | 1 |
| Utah Agricultural | 4 | – | 1 | – | 2 | 5 | – | 1 | – | 2 |
| Colorado Teachers | 3 | – | 3 | – | 0 | 6 | – | 4 | – | 0 |
| Denver | 4 | – | 4 | – | 0 | 4 | – | 4 | – | 0 |
| Wyoming | 1 | – | 2 | – | 2 | 2 | – | 4 | – | 2 |
| Colorado | 2 | – | 5 | – | 1 | 3 | – | 5 | – | 1 |
| BYU | 1 | – | 4 | – | 1 | 1 | – | 5 | – | 1 |
| Colorado Mines | 1 | – | 5 | – | 0 | 1 | – | 6 | – | 0 |
| Western State (CO) | 0 | – | 7 | – | 0 | 0 | – | 8 | – | 0 |
$ – Conference champion

The 1926 Colorado Silver and Gold football team was an American football team that represented the University of Colorado as a member of the Rocky Mountain Conference (RMC) during the 1926 college football season. Led by seventh-year head coach Myron E. Witham, Colorado compiled an overall record of 3–5–1 with a mark of 2–5–1 in conference play, placing ninth in the RMC.

== Schedule ==
| Date | Opponent | Site | Result | Attendance | Source |
|---|---|---|---|---|---|
| October 2 | Chadron Normal* | Colorado Stadium; Boulder, CO | W 25–0 | | |
| October 9 | Montana State | Colorado Stadium; Boulder, CO | L 3–6 | | |
| October 16 | Wyoming | Colorado Stadium; Boulder, CO | T 13–13 | | |
| October 23 | Utah^{†} | Colorado Stadium; Boulder, CO (rivalry) | L 3–37 | 8,000 | |
| October 30 | at Colorado College | Washburn Field; Colorado Springs, CO | L 0–21 | | |
| November 6 | at Colorado Mines | Brooks Field; Golden, CO | W 12–0 | | |
| November 13 | Colorado Agricultural | Colorado Stadium; Boulder, CO (rivalry) | L 0–3 | | |
| November 20 | Colorado Teachers | Colorado Stadium; Boulder, CO | W 12–3 | | |
| November 25 | at Denver | Hilltop Stadium; Denver, CO | L 9–20 | | |
*Non-conference game; ^{†}Homecoming
