= 1928 Utah Agricultural Aggies football team =

American college football season

1928 Utah Agricultural Aggies football
- Conference: Rocky Mountain Conference
- Record: 5–3–1 (4–2–1 RMC)
- Head coach: Dick Romney (10th season)
- Home stadium: Aggie Stadium

1928 Rocky Mountain Conference football standings
	Conf.					Overall
Team	W		L		T	W		L		T
Utah $	4	–	0	–	1	5	–	0	–	2
Colorado	5	–	1	–	0	5	–	1	–	0
Colorado Agricultural	6	–	2	–	0	6	–	2	–	0
Utah Agricultural	4	–	2	–	1	5	–	3	–	1
Colorado College	5	–	3	–	0	5	–	3	–	0
Montana State	3	–	2	–	0	4	–	4	–	1
Denver	3	–	4	–	1	4	–	4	–	1
Colorado Teachers	3	–	4	–	0	4	–	4	–	0
Colorado Mines	2	–	4	–	0	2	–	5	–	0
BYU	1	–	3	–	1	3	–	3	–	1
Wyoming	0	–	5	–	0	2	–	7	–	0
Western State (CO)	0	–	6	–	0	0	–	7	–	0
$ – Conference champion

The 1928 Utah Agricultural Aggies football team was an American football team that represented Utah Agricultural College in the Rocky Mountain Conference (RMC) during the 1928 college football season. In their 10th season under head coach Dick Romney, the Aggies compiled a 5–3–1 record (4–2–1 against RMC opponents), finished fourth in the conference, and outscored opponents by a total of 182 to 87.

== Schedule ==
Date	Opponent	Site	Result	Attendance	Source
September 29	at USC*	Los Angeles Memorial Coliseum; Los Angeles, CA	L 12–40	32,000	
October 6	Montana Mines*	Aggie Stadium; Logan, UT	W 54–0		
October 13	at Denver	DU Stadium; Denver, CO	T 7–7		
October 19	vs. Wyoming	Lorin Farr Park; Ogden, UT (rivalry)	W 24–6		
October 27	at BYU	BYU Stadium; Provo, UT (rivalry)	W 10–0	5,000	
November 3	at Colorado Agricultural	Colorado Field; Fort Collins, CO	L 6–7		
November 10	Western State (CO)	Aggie Stadium; Logan, UT	W 54–0		
November 17	Montana State	Aggie Stadium; Logan, UT	W 15–7		
November 29	at Utah	Ute Stadium; Salt Lake City, UT (rivalry)	L 0–20		
*Non-conference game
