= 1926 Utah Agricultural Aggies football team =

American college football season

1926 Utah Agricultural Aggies football
- Conference: Rocky Mountain Conference
- Record: 5–1–2 (4–1–2 RMC)
- Head coach: Dick Romney (8th season)
- Home stadium: Adams Field

1926 Rocky Mountain Conference football standings
	Conf.					Overall
Team	W		L		T	W		L		T
Utah $	5	–	0	–	0	7	–	0	–	0
Montana State	4	–	0	–	0	4	–	2	–	1
Colorado College	5	–	2	–	0	5	–	2	–	0
Colorado Agricultural	5	–	2	–	0	6	–	2	–	1
Utah Agricultural	4	–	1	–	2	5	–	1	–	2
Colorado Teachers	3	–	3	–	0	6	–	4	–	0
Denver	4	–	4	–	0	4	–	4	–	0
Wyoming	1	–	2	–	2	2	–	4	–	2
Colorado	2	–	5	–	1	3	–	5	–	1
BYU	1	–	4	–	1	1	–	5	–	1
Colorado Mines	1	–	5	–	0	1	–	6	–	0
Western State (CO)	0	–	7	–	0	0	–	8	–	0
$ – Conference champion

The 1926 Utah Agricultural Aggies football team was an American football team that represented Utah Agricultural College (later renamed Utah State University) in the Rocky Mountain Conference (RMC) during the 1926 college football season. In their eighth season under head coach Dick Romney, the Aggies compiled a 5–1–2 record (4–1–2 against RMC opponents), finished third in the conference, and outscored all opponents by a total of 93 to 43.

Two Utah State players received first-team all-conference honors in 1926: guard Robert Gibbons; and tackle Howard Linford.

== Schedule ==
Date	Opponent	Site	Result	Source
October 2	Montana Mines*	Adams Field; Logan, UT	W 29–0	
October 9	vs. Colorado College	Lorin Farr Park; Ogden, UT	W 7–0	
October 15	at BYU	Provo, UT (rivalry)	T 0–0	
October 23	at Wyoming	Campus athletic grounds; Laramie, WY (rivalry)	T 6–6	
October 30	at Denver	Denver University Stadium; Denver, CO	W 7–3	
November 6	at Colorado Agricultural	Colorado Field; Fort Collins, CO	W 13–0	
November 11	Western State (CO)	Adams Field; Logan, UT	W 31–0	
November 25	at Utah	Cummings Field; Salt Lake City, UT (rivalry)	L 0–34	
*Non-conference game
