= List of Denver Pioneers men's basketball head coaches =

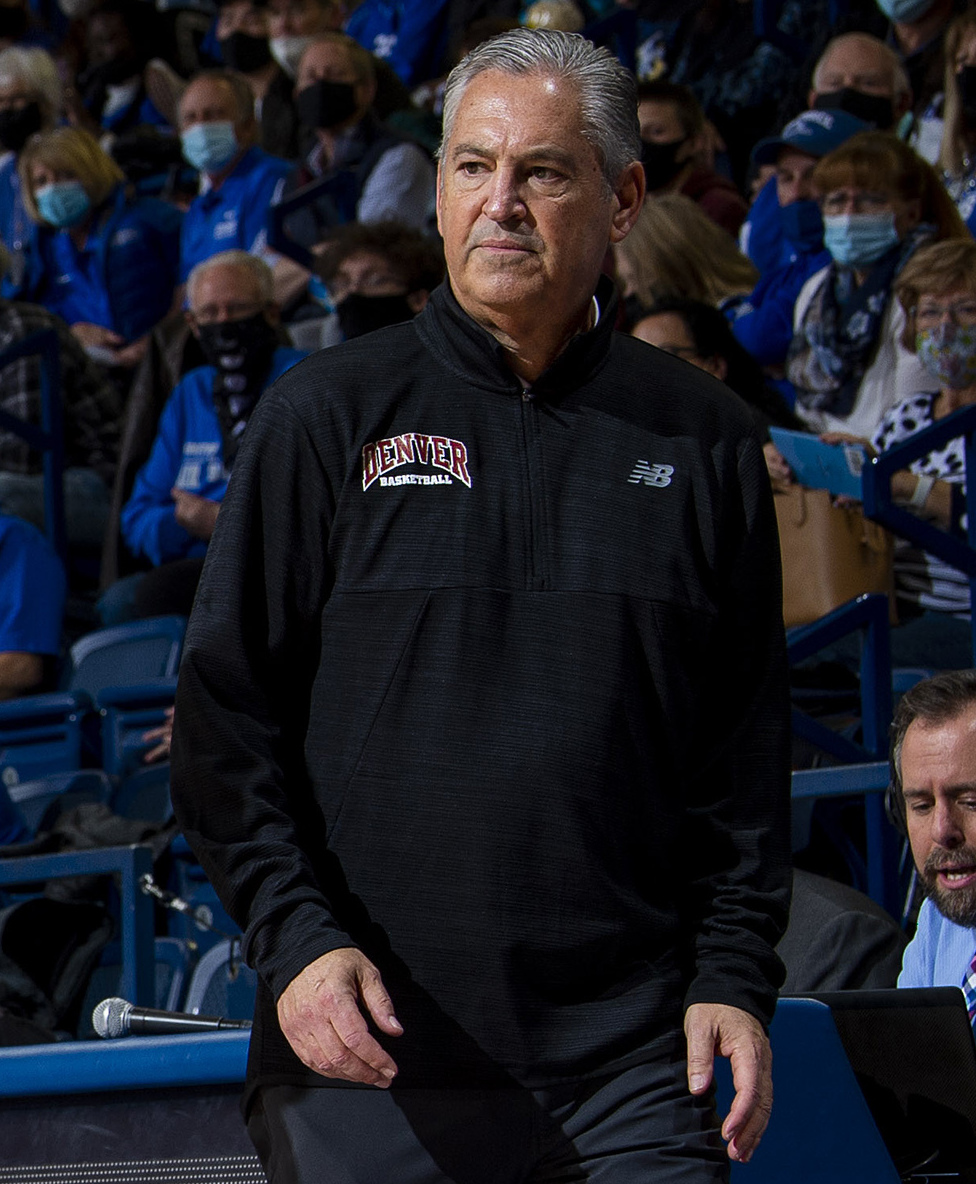
Jeff Wulbrun, the current head coach of the Denver Pioneers.

The following is a list of Denver Pioneers men's basketball head coaches. There have been 32 head coaches of the Pioneers in their 121-season history.

Denver's current head coach is Jeff Wulbrun. He was hired as the Pioneers' head coach in March 2021, replacing Rodney Billups, who was fired after the 2021–22 season.

No.	Tenure	Coach	Years	Record	Pct.
–	1903–1906	Unknown	3	10–8	.556
1	1906–1909	John P. Koehler	3	12–24	.333
2	1910–1911; 1914–1916; 1918–1919	Charles Wingender	4	24–15	.615
3	1911–1912	Clem Crowley	1	5–5	.500
4	1912–1914	Hiram Wilson	2	3–9	.250
5	1916–1918	John Fike	2	7–9	.438
6	1919–1920	George Koonsman	1	1–8	.111
7	1920–1921	Thomas Thompson	1	2–7	.222
8	1921–1923	Ralph Woods	2	10–13	.435
9	1923–1925	Aubrey Devine	2	9–14	.391
10	1925–1926	Jimmy Middlebrook	1	5–7	.417
11	1926–1930	Burt Potter	4	37–25	.597
12	1930–1932	Stuart Clark	2	13–23	.361
13	1932–1940	Cac Hubbard	8	66–83	.443
14	1940–1943 (Note: Ketchum left Denver to join the Armed Forces after 13 games of the 1942–43 season. Duncan served as interim coach for the remainder of the season.); 1946–1949 (Note: Ketchum left Denver after 15 games of the 1948–49 season. Brawner replaced him on a permanent basis.)	Ellison Ketchum	6	63–57	.525
15	1943*	Mark Duncan	1	8–6	.571
16	1943–1944	Art Quinlan	1	6–18	.250
17	1944–1945	Cliff Rock	1	7–16	.304
18	1945–1946	Ken Loeffler	1	9–15	.375
19	1949–1962	Hoyt Brawner	14	163–191	.460
20	1962–1968	Troy Bledsoe	6	61–90	.404
21	1968–1970	Stan Albeck	2	15–35	.300
22	1970–1972	Jim Karabetsos	2	28–24	.538
23	1972–1977	Al Harden	5	61–70	.466
24	1977–1978	Bill Weimar	1	10–17	.370
25	1978–1980	Ben Jobe	2	34–22	.607
26	1980–1985	Floyd Theard	5	107–38	.738
27	1985–1997	Dick Peth	12	221–123	.642
28	1997–2001	Marty Fletcher	4	33–77	.300
29	2001–2007	Terry Carroll	6	79–99	.444
30	2007–2016	Joe Scott	9	146–132	.525
31	2016–2021	Rodney Billups	5	48–96	.333
32	2021–present	Jeff Wulbrun	3	43–55	.439
Totals		32 coaches	121 seasons	1,347–1,428	.485
Records updated through end of 2023–24 season * - Denotes interim head coach. Source
