= 1893 in basketball =

The following are the basketball events of the year 1893 throughout the world.

== Events ==
- Clara Gregory Baer introduces basket-ball (as it was written at the time) to Sophie Newcomb College (now part of Tulane University)
- February 7 – Vanderbilt University plays against the local YMCA in Nashville, Tennessee – the first recorded instance of a college basketball team facing an outside opponent.
- April 8 – In the second recorded instance of an organized college basketball game, Geneva College faces the New Brighton YMCA in Beaver Falls, Pennsylvania.

== Births ==
- Birch Bayh (basketball coach), coach
- Benjamin Van Alstyne, coach
- William Reid (basketball), coach
- Clarence Applegran, coach
- Wilmer D. Elfrink, coach and player
- Norman C. Paine, coach
