= Harry G. Buckingham =

American football player and coach (1887–1951)

Biographical details
- Born: April 12, 1887
- Died: January 11, 1951 (aged 63)

Playing career
- 1907–1908: Princeton
- Positions: Guard, end

Coaching career (HC unless noted)
- 1913: Colorado Mines
- 1914: Denver
- 1920: Memphis (assistant)
- 1921–1922: Santa Clara

Head coaching record
- Overall: 20–9–1

Henry Gunn Buckingham (April 12, 1887 – January 11, 1951) was an American football player and coach. He served as the head football coach at the Colorado School of Mines in 1913, the University of Denver in 1914, and Santa Clara University from 1921 to 1922, compiling a career college football coaching record of 20–9–1.

Buckingham was a graduate of Princeton University and was the brother of Nash Buckingham.

== Head coaching record ==
Year	Team	Overall	Conference	Standing
Colorado Mines Orediggers (Rocky Mountain Conference) (1913)
1913	Colorado Mines	5–1	5–1	2nd
Colorado Mines:		5–1	5–1	
Denver Ministers (Rocky Mountain Conference) (1914)
1914	Denver	5–4	1–4	7th
Denver:		5–4	1–4	
Santa Clara Missionites (Independent) (1921–1922)
1921	Santa Clara	6–0		
1922	Santa Clara	4–4–1		
Santa Clara:		10–4–1		
Total:		20–9–1		
