= 1921 Nevada Sagebrushers football team =

American college football season

1921 Nevada Sagebrushers football
- Conference: Independent
- Record: 4–3–1
- Head coach: Ray Courtright (3rd season)
- Home stadium: Mackay Field

1921 Western college football independents records
| | Conf. | | | Overall |
| Team | W | L | T | W | | L | | T |
|---|---|---|---|---|---|---|---|---|
| USC | | – | | 10 | – | 1 | – | 0 |
| Arizona | | – | | 7 | – | 2 | – | 0 |
| Santa Clara | | – | | 6 | – | 0 | – | 0 |
| La Verne | | – | | 4 | – | 2 | – | 1 |
| Chico State | | – | | 4 | – | 3 | – | 1 |
| Nevada | | – | | 4 | – | 3 | – | 1 |
| Saint Mary's | | – | | 4 | – | 3 | – | 0 |
| Hawaii | | – | | 3 | – | 3 | – | 2 |
| Pacific (CA) | | – | | 3 | – | 3 | – | 0 |
| University Farm | | – | | 3 | – | 4 | – | 0 |
| New Mexico | | – | | 2 | – | 2 | – | 0 |
| New Mexico A&M | | – | | 2 | – | 2 | – | 0 |
| Gonzaga | | – | | 2 | – | 4 | – | 1 |
| Fresno State | | – | | 2 | – | 4 | – | 0 |
| San Jose State | | – | | 1 | – | 5 | – | 0 |

The 1921 Nevada Sagebrushers football team was an American football team that represented the University of Nevada as an independent during the 1921 college football season. In their third season under head coach Ray Courtright, the team compiled a 4–3–1 record and outscored its opponents by a total of 183 to 113. The Sagebrushers were the first team to score against the 1921 California Golden Bears football team that was recognized as the 1921 national champion. The Sagebrushers were also the only team to defeat the 1921 Utah Agricultural Aggies football team that won the Rocky Mountain Conference (RMC) championship.

Nevada's star player Jimmy "Rabbit" Bradshaw was a second-team halfback on the 1921 College Football All-America Team selected by Malcolm McLean. McLean also selected Bradshaw as the first-team quarterback on his 1921 All-Western team. McLean wrote: "The Nevada star, while not a large man, is quick as a flash, a wonder on a running team and has been compared to Walter Eckersall, former Maroon star as an all-round player. He is one of the greatest open-field runners in the country."

Will Martin was Nevada's 1921 team captain.

== Schedule ==
| Date | Opponent | Site | Result | Source |
|---|---|---|---|---|
| September 11 | Agnetian Club | Mackay Field; Reno, NV | W 54–0 | |
| October 2 | Pacific Fleet | Mackay Field; Reno, NV | L 13–14 | |
| October 8 | at California | California Field; Berkeley, CA | L 6–51 | |
| October 15 | at Saint Mary's | Mackay Field; Reno, NV | L 6–14 | |
| October 22 | at Utah Agricultural | Adams Field; Logan, UT | W 41–0 | |
| October 29 | University Farm | Mackay Field; Reno, NV | W 21–13 | |
| November 5 | Utah | Mackay Field; Reno, NV | W 28–7 | |
| November 12 | at Stanford | Stanford Field; Stanford, CA | T 14–14 | |
