= 1917 Colorado Silver and Gold football team =

American college football season

1917 Colorado Silver and Gold football
- Conference: Rocky Mountain Conference
- Record: 6–2 (4–2 RMC)
- Head coach: Bob Evans (2nd season)
- Captain: Wilbur Adams
- Home stadium: Gamble Field

1917 Rocky Mountain Conference football standings
	Conf.					Overall
Team	W		L		T	W		L		T
Denver $	6	–	0	–	0	9	–	0	–	0
Utah Agricultural	4	–	0	–	0	7	–	0	–	1
Colorado	4	–	2	–	0	6	–	2	–	0
Colorado Mines	2	–	3	–	0	5	–	3	–	0
Colorado College	2	–	3	–	0	3	–	3	–	0
Utah	2	–	3	–	0	2	–	4	–	0
Wyoming	1	–	4	–	0	3	–	4	–	0
Montana State	0	–	1	–	2	0	–	2	–	2
Colorado Agricultural	0	–	7	–	1	1	–	7	–	1
$ – Conference champion

The 1917 Colorado Silver and Gold football team was an American football team that represented the University of Colorado as a member of the Rocky Mountain Conference (RMC) during the 1917 college football season. Led by Bob Evans in his second and final year as head coach, Colorado compiled an overall record of 6–2 with a mark of 4–2 in conference play, placing third in the RMC.

== Schedule ==
Date	Opponent	Site	Result	Source
September 22	Colorado alumni*	Gamble Field; Boulder, CO	W 6–0	
September 29	at Colorado Teachers*	Greeley, CO	W 54–0	
October 13	at Denver	Denver, CO	L 0–7	
October 20	vs. Colorado Mines	Denver, CO	W 12–0	
November 3	Colorado College^{†}	Gamble Field; Boulder, CO	W 18–17	
November 10	Utah	Gamble Field; Boulder, CO (rivalry)	W 18–9	
November 17	at Utah Agricultural	Adams Field; Logan, UT	L 0–23	
November 29	at Colorado Agricultural	Colorado Field; Fort Collins, CO (rivalry)	W 6–0	
*Non-conference game; ^{†}Homecoming
