= 1917 Wyoming Cowboys football team =

American college football season

1917 Wyoming Cowboys football
- Conference: Rocky Mountain Conference
- Record: 3–4 (1–4 RMC)
- Head coach: John Corbett (3rd season)
- Captain: None

1917 Rocky Mountain Conference football standings
	Conf.					Overall
Team	W		L		T	W		L		T
Denver $	6	–	0	–	0	9	–	0	–	0
Utah Agricultural	4	–	0	–	1	7	–	0	–	1
Colorado	4	–	2	–	0	6	–	2	–	0
Colorado Mines	2	–	3	–	0	5	–	3	–	0
Colorado College	2	–	3	–	0	3	–	3	–	0
Utah	2	–	3	–	0	2	–	4	–	0
Wyoming	1	–	4	–	0	3	–	4	–	0
Montana State	0	–	1	–	2	0	–	2	–	2
Colorado Agricultural	0	–	7	–	1	1	–	7	–	1
$ – Conference champion

The 1917 Wyoming Cowboys football team was an American football team that represented the University of Wyoming as a member of the Rocky Mountain Conference (RMC) during the 1917 college football season. In their third season under head coach John Corbett, the Cowboys compiled a 3–4 record (1–4 against conference opponents), finished seventh in the RMC, and were outscored by a total of 140 to 24.

== Schedule ==
Date	Opponent	Site	Result	Source
October 6	Colorado Agricultural	Laramie, WY (rivalry)	W 6–0	
October 13	Colorado Mines	Laramie, WY	L 3–51	
October 20	at Utah	Cummings Field; Salt Lake City, UT	L 0–14	
October 24	at Utah Agricultural	Adams Field; Logan, UT (rivalry)	L 0–57	
November 3	Denver	Laramie, WY	L 0–18	
November 10	Colorado Teachers*	Laramie, WY	W 7–0	
November 29	at Colorado Teachers*	Greeley, CO	W 8–0	
*Non-conference game
