= 1913 Colorado Silver and Gold football team =

American college football season

1913 Colorado Silver and Gold football

RMC champion
- Conference: Rocky Mountain Conference
- Record: 5–1–1 (4–0–1 RMC)
- Head coach: Fred Folsom (13th season)
- Captain: Carl Knowles
- Home stadium: Gamble Field

1913 Rocky Mountain Conference football standings
	Conf.					Overall
Team	W		L		T	W		L		T
Colorado $	4	–	0	–	1	5	–	1	–	1
Colorado Mines	5	–	1	–	0	5	–	1	–	0
Colorado College	2	–	2	–	1	5	–	2	–	1
Colorado Agricultural $	2	–	2	–	0	3	–	2	–	0
Utah	1	–	2	–	0	2	–	4	–	1
Denver	1	–	3	–	0	2	–	5	–	0
Wyoming	0	–	5	–	0	0	–	5	–	0
$ – Conference champion

The 1913 Colorado Silver and Gold football team was an American football team that represented the University of Colorado as a member of the Rocky Mountain Conference (RMC) during the 1913 college football season. In its 13th year under head coach Fred Folsom, the team compiled a 5–1–1 record (4–0–1 against RMC opponents), won the conference championship, and outscored all opponents by a total of 82 to 33.

== Schedule ==
Date	Opponent	Site	Result	Source
October 4	at Wyoming	Prexy's Pasture; Laramie, WY	W 7–0	
October 11	Colorado alumni*	Gamble Field; Boulder, CO	W 6–0	
October 25	Colorado Agricultural	Gamble Field; Boulder, CO (rivalry)	W 16–7	
November 1	Colorado College	Gamble Field; Boulder, CO	T 0–0	
November 8	at Utah	Cummings Field; Salt Lake City, UT (rivalry)	W 30–12	
November 15	at Colorado Mines	Athletic Park; Golden, CO	W 20–0	
November 27	at Oklahoma*	Boyd Field; Norman, OK	L 3–14	
*Non-conference game
