= 1915 Wyoming Cowboys football team =

American college football season

1915 Wyoming Cowboys football
- Conference: Rocky Mountain Conference
- Record: 2–6 (1–5 RMC)
- Head coach: John Corbett (1st season)
- Captain: None

1915 Rocky Mountain Conference football standings
	Conf.					Overall
Team	W		L		T	W		L		T
Colorado Agricultural $	7	–	0	–	0	7	–	0	–	0
Utah	4	–	2	–	0	5	–	2	–	0
Colorado Mines	4	–	2	–	0	4	–	2	–	0
Colorado College	3	–	2	–	0	6	–	2	–	0
Denver	2	–	3	–	0	4	–	3	–	0
Wyoming	1	–	5	–	0	2	–	6	–	0
Colorado	1	–	5	–	0	1	–	6	–	0
Utah Agricultural	0	–	3	–	0	3	–	4	–	0
$ – Conference champion

The 1915 Wyoming Cowboys football team was an American football team that represented the University of Wyoming as a member of the Rocky Mountain Conference (RMC) during the 1915 college football season. In their first season under head coach John Corbett, the Cowboys compiled a 2–6 record (1–5 against conference opponents), tied for sixth place in the RMC, and were outscored by a total of 213 to 46.

== Schedule ==
Date	Opponent	Site	Result	Source
September 25	Laramie High School*	Laramie, WY	W 19–0	
October 2	at Colorado	Gamble Field; Boulder, CO	L 0–30	
October 9	Utah	Laramie, WY	L 7–70	
October 16	at Colorado Mines	Golden, CO	L 0–19	
October 23	Denver	Laramie, WY	L 7–19	
October 27	Utah Agricultural	Laramie, WY (rivalry)	W 13–7	
November 6	Colorado Agricultural	Laramie, WY (rivalry)	L 0–47	
November 19	at Nebraska Wesleyan*	Lincoln, NE	L 0–20	
*Non-conference game
