= 1913 Utah Agricultural Aggies football team =

American college football season

1913 Utah Agricultural Aggies football
- Conference: Independent
- Record: 3–3
- Head coach: Clayton Teetzel (5th season)

1913 Western college football independents records
	Conf.			Overall
Team	W	L	T	W		L		T
New Mexico A&M		–		7	–	0	–	1
Utah Agricultural		–		3	–	3	–	0
New Mexico		–		3	–	2	–	0
Arizona		–		2	–	2	–	0
Montana A&M		–		2	–	2	–	0
Montana		–		2	–	4	–	0
Cheney Normal		–		1	–	5	–	0

The 1913 Utah Agricultural Aggies football team was an American football team that represented Utah Agricultural College (later renamed Utah State University) during the 1913 college football season. In their fifth season under head coach Clayton Teetzel, the Aggies compiled a 3–3 record and outscored opponents by a total of 97 to 69.

== Schedule ==
Date	Opponent	Site	Result	Source
	at Salt Lake High School		W 60–26	
October 18	Logan Stars (alumni)	Logan, UT	L 0–3	
October 25	at Montana	Dornblaser Field; Missoula, MT	W 9–7	
October 28	at Montana A&M	Bozeman, MT	L 0–13	
November 8	at Colorado Agricultural	Fort Collins, CO	L 7–20	
November 27	Utah	Adams Field; Logan, UT (rivalry)	W 21–0	
