= Eugene F. Bunker =

American football player and coach (1888–1956)

Biographical details
- Born: February 4, 1888; Woodstock, Illinois
- Died: May 29, 1956 (aged 68)

Playing career
- 1907–1910: Wisconsin

Coaching career (HC unless noted)
- 1911: Wisconsin (assistant)
- 1912: Bozeman HS (MT)
- 1913: Montana State

Head coaching record
- Overall: 2–2 (college)

Eugene Francis Bunker (February 4, 1888 – May 29, 1956) was an American football player and coach. He served as the head football coach at the Montana College of Agriculture and Mechanic Arts—now known as Montana State University—in Bozeman, Montana in 1913, compiling a record of 2–2.

== Head coaching record ==
=== College ===
Year	Team	Overall	Conference	Standing	Bowl/playoffs
Montana A&M (Independent) (1913)
1913	Montana A&M	2–2			
Montana A&M:		2–2			
Total:		2–2			
