= 1917 Utah Agricultural Aggies football team =

American college football season

1917 Utah Agricultural Aggies football
- Conference: Rocky Mountain Conference
- Record: 7–0–1 (4–0 RMC)
- Head coach: Jack Watson (2nd season)
- Home stadium: Adams Field

1917 Rocky Mountain Conference football standings
	Conf.					Overall
Team	W		L		T	W		L		T
Denver $	6	–	0	–	0	9	–	0	–	0
Utah Agricultural	4	–	0	–	1	7	–	0	–	1
Colorado	4	–	2	–	0	6	–	2	–	0
Colorado Mines	2	–	3	–	0	5	–	3	–	0
Colorado College	2	–	3	–	0	3	–	3	–	0
Utah	2	–	3	–	0	2	–	4	–	0
Wyoming	1	–	4	–	0	3	–	4	–	0
Montana State	0	–	1	–	2	0	–	2	–	2
Colorado Agricultural	0	–	7	–	1	1	–	7	–	1
$ – Conference champion

The 1917 Utah Agricultural Aggies football team was an American football team that represented Utah Agricultural College (later renamed Utah State University) in the Rocky Mountain Conference (RMC) during the 1917 college football season. In their second and final season under head coach Jack Watson, the Aggies compiled a 7–0–1 record (4–0 against RMC opponents), shut out four of eight opponents, and outscored all opponents by a total of 267 to 26. The team was regarded as the strongest squad fielded by the school to that time.

At the end of the season, both Denver and Utah State were undefeated against Rocky Mountain Conference opponents. A game between Denver and Utah State was proposed to determine an undisputed conference champion, but Denver's faculty ruled against the game. Denver officials claimed the title and asserted that the Utah Aggies "have a right to claim nothing more than a tie for the honors." Despite the controversy at the time, Utah State does not claim a conference championship for 1917 and lists the seasons as a second-place finish in its media guide.

== Schedule ==
Date	Opponent	Site	Result	Source
September 29	Granite High School*	Adams Field; Logan, UT	W 77–0	
October 6	Utah Light Field Artillery*	Adams Field; Logan, UT	W 21–6	
October 13	at Montana*	Dornblaser Field; Missoula, MT	W 21–6	
October 19	at Montana State*	Bozeman, MT	T 7–7	
October 24	Wyoming	Adams Field; Logan, UT (rivalry)	W 57–0	
November 6	Colorado Agricultural	Adams Field; Logan, UT	W 47–7	
November 17	Colorado	Adams Field; Logan, UT	W 23–0	
November 29	Utah	Adams Field; Logan, UT (rivalry)	W 14–0	
*Non-conference game
