= 1915 Utah Agricultural Aggies football team =

American college football season

1915 Utah Agricultural Aggies football
- Conference: Rocky Mountain Conference
- Record: 3–4 (0–3 RMC)
- Head coach: Clayton Teetzel (7th season)
- Home stadium: Adams Field

1915 Rocky Mountain Conference football standings
	Conf.					Overall
Team	W		L		T	W		L		T
Colorado Agricultural $	7	–	0	–	0	7	–	0	–	0
Utah	4	–	2	–	0	5	–	2	–	0
Colorado Mines	4	–	2	–	0	4	–	2	–	0
Colorado College	3	–	2	–	0	6	–	2	–	0
Denver	2	–	3	–	0	4	–	3	–	0
Wyoming	1	–	5	–	0	2	–	6	–	0
Colorado	1	–	5	–	0	1	–	6	–	0
Utah Agricultural	0	–	3	–	0	3	–	4	–	0
$ – Conference champion

The 1915 Utah Agricultural Aggies football team was an American football team that represented Utah Agricultural College (later renamed Utah State University) in the Rocky Mountain Conference (RMC) during the 1915 college football season. In their seventh and final season under head coach Clayton Teetzel, the Aggies compiled a 3–4 record (0–3 against RMC opponents), finished eighth in the RMC, and were outscored by a total of 99 to 56.

== Schedule ==
Date	Opponent	Site	Result	Source
October 9	Granite High School*	Adams Field; Logan, UT	W 13–0	
October 16	Nevada*	Adams Field; Logan, UT	W 26–0	
October 23	at Colorado Agricultural	Colorado Field; Fort Collins, CO	L 0–59	
October 27	at Wyoming	Laramie, WY (rivalry)	L 7–13	
November 6	Montana Mines*	Adams Field; Logan, UT	W 10–6	
November 13	Montana A&M*	Bozeman, MT	L 0–7	
November 25	at Utah	Cummings Field; Salt Lake City, UT (rivalry)	L 0–14	
*Non-conference game
