= 1917 Colorado Agricultural Aggies football team =

American college football season

1917 Colorado Agricultural Aggies football
- Conference: Rocky Mountain Conference
- Record: 1–7–1 (0–7–1 RMC)
- Head coach: Harry W. Hughes (7th season)
- Home stadium: Colorado Field

1917 Rocky Mountain Conference football standings
	Conf.					Overall
Team	W		L		T	W		L		T
Denver $	6	–	0	–	0	9	–	0	–	0
Utah Agricultural	4	–	0	–	0	7	–	0	–	1
Colorado	4	–	2	–	0	6	–	2	–	0
Colorado Mines	2	–	3	–	0	5	–	3	–	0
Colorado College	2	–	3	–	0	3	–	3	–	0
Utah	2	–	3	–	0	2	–	4	–	0
Wyoming	1	–	4	–	0	3	–	4	–	0
Montana State	0	–	1	–	2	0	–	2	–	2
Colorado Agricultural	0	–	7	–	1	1	–	7	–	1
$ – Conference champion

The 1917 Colorado Agricultural Aggies football team represented Colorado Agricultural College—now known as Colorado State University—as a member of the Rocky Mountain Conference (RMC) during the 1917 college football season. In their seventh season under head coach Harry W. Hughes, the Aggies compiled an overall record 1–7–1 record with a mark of 0–7–1 in conference play, placing last out of nine teams in the RMC.

== Schedule ==
Date	Opponent	Site	Result	Source
October 6	at Wyoming	Laramie, WY (rivalry)	L 0–6	
October 12	Montana State	Fort Collins, CO	T 20–20	
October 19	at Colorado Teachers*	Greeley, CO	W 20–7	
October 27	Denver	Fort Collins, CO	L 6–10	
November 3	at Utah	Cummings Field; Salt Lake City, UT	L 12–25	
November 6	at Utah Agricultural	Adams Field; Logan, UT	L 7–47	
November 17	at Colorado College	Colorado Springs, CO	L 0–7	
November 24	at Colorado Mines	Golden, CO	L 6–27	
November 29	Colorado	Colorado Field; Fort Collins, CO (rivalry)	L 0–6	
*Non-conference game
