= 1921 Pacific Tigers football team =

American college football season

1921 Pacific Tigers football
- Conference: Independent
- Record: 3–3
- Head coach: Erwin Righter (1st season)

1921 Western college football independents records
| | Conf. | | | Overall |
| Team | W | L | T | W | | L | | T |
|---|---|---|---|---|---|---|---|---|
| USC | | – | | 10 | – | 1 | – | 0 |
| Arizona | | – | | 7 | – | 2 | – | 0 |
| Santa Clara | | – | | 6 | – | 0 | – | 0 |
| La Verne | | – | | 4 | – | 2 | – | 1 |
| Chico State | | – | | 4 | – | 3 | – | 1 |
| Nevada | | – | | 4 | – | 3 | – | 1 |
| Saint Mary's | | – | | 4 | – | 3 | – | 0 |
| Hawaii | | – | | 3 | – | 3 | – | 2 |
| Pacific (CA) | | – | | 3 | – | 3 | – | 0 |
| University Farm | | – | | 3 | – | 4 | – | 0 |
| New Mexico | | – | | 2 | – | 2 | – | 0 |
| New Mexico A&M | | – | | 2 | – | 2 | – | 0 |
| Gonzaga | | – | | 2 | – | 4 | – | 1 |
| Fresno State | | – | | 2 | – | 4 | – | 0 |
| San Jose State | | – | | 1 | – | 5 | – | 0 |

The 1921 Pacific Tigers football team represented the College of the Pacific—now known as the University of the Pacific—in Stockton, California as an independent during the 1921 college football season. Led by first-year head coach Erwin Righter, Pacific compiled a record of 3–3, the first time the program had more than one win in a season. They scored 117 points on the year, more than their total from the previous six seasons combined.

== Schedule ==
| Date | Opponent | Site | Result | Source |
|---|---|---|---|---|
| October 15 | Fresno State | C.O.P. Field; College Park, San Jose, CA | W 35–0 | |
| October 22 | at Mare Island Sailors | Mare Island Naval Shipyard; Vallejo, CA | L 7–39 | |
| October 29 | at Stanford freshmen | Stanford, CA | L 6–49 | |
| November 4 | San Jose State | C.O.P. Field; College Park, San Jose, CA (rivalry) | W 34–0 | |
| | California freshmen | | L 0–42 | |
| November 18 | Chico State | C.O.P. Field; College Park, San Jose, CA | W 28–0 | |
