= 1916 Colorado Agricultural Aggies football team =

American college football season

1916 Colorado Agricultural Aggies football

RMC champion
- Conference: Rocky Mountain Conference
- Record: 6–0–1 (6–0–1 RMC)
- Head coach: Harry W. Hughes (6th season)
- Home stadium: Colorado Field

1916 Rocky Mountain Conference football standings
	Conf.					Overall
Team	W		L		T	W		L		T
Colorado Agricultural $	6	–	0	–	1	6	–	0	–	1
Colorado College	4	–	1	–	0	6	–	1	–	0
Denver	3	–	2	–	0	4	–	2	–	1
Utah	2	–	2	–	0	3	–	2	–	0
Colorado Mines	2	–	2	–	1	3	–	2	–	1
Wyoming	1	–	4	–	0	1	–	4	–	0
Colorado	1	–	5	–	0	1	–	5	–	1
Utah Agricultural	0	–	4	–	0	1	–	5	–	1
$ – Conference champion

The 1916 Colorado Agricultural Aggies football team represented Colorado Agricultural College (now known as Colorado State University) in the Rocky Mountain Conference (RMC) during the 1916 college football season. In their sixth season under head coach Harry W. Hughes, the Aggies compiled a 6–0–1 record, won the RMC championship, and outscored all opponents by a total of 172 to 45.

Four Colorado Agricultural players received all-conference honors in 1916: center Charles Shepardson, tackle Horace Doke, end Ralph (Sag) Robinson, and guard Ray West.

== Schedule ==
Date	Opponent	Site	Result	Source
September 30	Wyoming	Colorado Field; Fort Collins, CO (rivalry)	W 40–0	
October 14	at Utah Agricultural	Logan, UT	W 53–0	
October 28	Colorado College	Colorado Field; Fort Collins, CO	W 14–12	
November 4	at Denver	Denver, CO	W 21–13	
November 11	at Colorado Mines	Golden, CO	T 0–0	
November 18	Utah	Colorado Field; Fort Collins, CO	W 12–6	
November 30	at Colorado	Gamble Field; Boulder, CO (rivalry)	W 32–14	
