= 1921 Santa Clara Missionites football team =

American college football season

1921 Santa Clara Missionites football
- Conference: Independent
- Record: 6–0
- Head coach: Harry G. Buckingham (1st season)
- Home stadium: Mission Field

1921 Western college football independents records
	Conf.			Overall
Team	W	L	T	W		L		T
USC		–		10	–	1	–	0
Arizona		–		7	–	2	–	0
Santa Clara		–		6	–	0	–	0
La Verne		–		4	–	2	–	1
Chico State		–		4	–	3	–	1
Nevada		–		4	–	3	–	1
Saint Mary's		–		4	–	3	–	0
Hawaii		–		3	–	3	–	2
Pacific (CA)		–		3	–	3	–	0
University Farm		–		3	–	4	–	0
New Mexico		–		2	–	2	–	0
New Mexico A&M		–		2	–	2	–	0
Gonzaga		–		2	–	4	–	1
Fresno State		–		2	–	4	–	0
San Jose State		–		1	–	5	–	0

The 1921 Santa Clara Missionites football team was an American football team that represented Santa Clara University as an independent during the 1921 college football season. The team compiled a 6–0 record, shut out five of six opponents, and outscored all opponents by a total of 224 to 9.

On September 1, 1921, Santa Clara hired Harry G. Buckingham as its football coach. He played football as a tackle at Princeton and later coached at Colorado School of Mines and Memphis University. He remained as Santa Clara's football coach for two years.

== Schedule ==
Date	Opponent	Site	Result	Source
October 2	Antioch Athletic Club	Mission Field; Santa Clara, CA	W 73–0	
October 9	San Francisco American Legion	Mission Field; Santa Clara, CA	W 7–0	
October 15	University Farm	Mission Field; Santa Clara, CA	W 48–0	
October 23	Agnetian Club	Mission Field; Santa Clara, CA	W 41–0	
October 30	Mare Island Marines	Mission Field; Santa Clara, CA	W 14–9	
November 20	Fresno American Legion	Fresno, CA	W 41–0	
