= 1921 Fresno State Bulldogs football team =

American college football season

1921 Fresno State Bulldogs football
- Conference: Independent
- Record: 2–4
- Head coach: Arthur W. Jones (1st season)
- Home stadium: Speedway field

1921 Western college football independents records
	Conf.			Overall
Team	W	L	T	W		L		T
USC		–		10	–	1	–	0
Arizona		–		7	–	2	–	0
Santa Clara		–		6	–	0	–	0
La Verne		–		4	–	2	–	1
Chico State		–		4	–	3	–	1
Nevada		–		4	–	3	–	1
Saint Mary's		–		4	–	3	–	0
Hawaii		–		3	–	3	–	2
Pacific (CA)		–		3	–	3	–	0
University Farm		–		3	–	4	–	0
New Mexico		–		2	–	2	–	0
New Mexico A&M		–		2	–	2	–	0
Gonzaga		–		2	–	4	–	1
Fresno State		–		2	–	4	–	0
San Jose State		–		1	–	5	–	0

The 1921 Fresno State Bulldogs football team represented Fresno State Normal School—now known as California State University, Fresno—during the 1921 college football season. 1921 was the inaugural season of intercollegiate play for Fresno State. The Bulldogs competed as an independent in 1921 and became a charter member of the California Coast Conference (CCC) the following season. Emory Ratcliffe coached the team in practice until a permanent coach could be hired. Along came Arthur W. Jones, appointed "athletic coach," and leading the Bulldogs in football, basketball, and baseball that year. The 1921 Bulldogs were captained by end John Goree. They finished the season with a record of 2–4.

== Schedule ==
Date	Opponent	Site	Result	Source
October 15	at Pacific (CA)	San Jose, CA	L 0–35	
October 22	Caltech JV	Fresno, CA	W 12–0	
November 5	Chico State	Speedway field; Fresno, CA	L 0–3	
November 11	at Modesto	Modesto, CA	W 28–0	
November 18	San Jose State	Fresno, CA (rivalry)	L 2–14	
November 24	Fresno High School	Fresno, CA	L 7–62	
