= 1914 Colorado Mines Orediggers football team =

American college football season

1914 Colorado Mines Orediggers football

RMC champion
- Conference: Rocky Mountain Conference
- Record: 5–0–1 (5–0–1 RMC)
- Head coach: Bo Hanley (1st season)

1914 Rocky Mountain Conference football standings
	Conf.					Overall
Team	W		L		T	W		L		T
Colorado Mines $	5	–	0	–	1	5	–	0	–	1
Colorado	4	–	1	–	0	5	–	1	–	0
Colorado College	3	–	1	–	1	4	–	1	–	1
Colorado Agricultural	3	–	3	–	0	3	–	4	–	0
Utah	2	–	3	–	0	3	–	3	–	0
Utah Agricultural	1	–	2	–	0	2	–	5	–	0
Denver	1	–	4	–	0	5	–	4	–	0
Wyoming	0	–	5	–	0	1	–	5	–	0
$ – Conference champion

The 1914 Colorado Mines Orediggers football team represented the Colorado School of Mines in the 1914 college football season. The team won the Rocky Mountain Conference.

== Schedule ==
Date	Opponent	Site	Result
October 10	Colorado	Brooks Field; Golden, CO	W 6–2
October 17	at Wyoming	Laramie, WY	W 25–0
October 24	Utah	Brooks Field; Golden CO	W 13–6
November 7	at Denver	Denver, CO	W 18–0
November 21	Colorado Agricultural	Brooks Field; Golden, CO	W 19–0
November 26	at Colorado College	Colorado Springs, CO	T 7–7
