= 1921 University Farm football team =

American college football season

1921 University Farm football
- Conference: Independent
- Record: 3–4
- Head coach: Wilmer D. Elfrink (1st season)
- Captain: Alan Carter

1921 Western college football independents records
	Conf.			Overall
Team	W	L	T	W		L		T
USC		–		10	–	1	–	0
Arizona		–		7	–	2	–	0
Santa Clara		–		6	–	0	–	0
La Verne		–		4	–	2	–	1
Chico State		–		4	–	3	–	1
Nevada		–		4	–	3	–	1
Saint Mary's		–		4	–	3	–	0
Hawaii		–		3	–	3	–	2
Pacific (CA)		–		3	–	3	–	0
University Farm		–		3	–	4	–	0
New Mexico		–		2	–	2	–	0
New Mexico A&M		–		2	–	2	–	0
Gonzaga		–		2	–	4	–	1
Fresno State		–		2	–	4	–	0
San Jose State		–		1	–	5	–	0

The 1921 University Farm football team represented the University Farm—now known as the University of California, Davis—as an independent during the 1921 college football season. Although "University Farm" was the formal name for the school and team, in many newspaper articles from the time it was called "Davis Farm". The team had no nickname in 1921, with the "Aggie" term being introduced in 1922. Led by Wilmer D. Elfrink in his first and only season as head coach, the team compiled a record of 3–4 and was outscored its opponents 131 to 78 for the season. The University Farm played home games in Davis, California.

== Schedule ==
Date	Opponent	Site	Result	Source
September 24?	Preston Industrial School (Note: The Preston School of Industry opened in 1894 to rehabilitate juvenile offenders. It remained open until 2011.)		W 13–7	
October 1	California freshmen	Davis, CA	L 7–35	
October 15	at Santa Clara	Mission Field; Santa Clara, CA	L 0–48	
October 22	California freshmen	California Field; Berkeley, CA	L 0–20	
October 29	at Nevada	Mackay Stadium (Note: This stadium is the predecessor to the current Mackay Stadium, which was opened for the 1966 season."University of Nevada, Reno; Mackay Stadium".); Reno, NV	L 13–21	
November 4?	Mare Island		W 7–0	
November 11	Agnetian Club	Sacramento, CA	W 38–0	
