= 1921 Arizona Wildcats football team =

American college football season

1921 Arizona Wildcats football

East-West Christmas Classic, L 0–38 vs. Centre
- Conference: Independent
- Record: 7–2
- Head coach: Pop McKale (7th season)
- Captain: Walter William Wofford

1921 Western college football independents records
	Conf.			Overall
Team	W	L	T	W		L		T
USC		–		10	–	1	–	0
Arizona		–		7	–	2	–	0
Santa Clara		–		6	–	0	–	0
La Verne		–		4	–	2	–	1
Chico State		–		4	–	3	–	1
Nevada		–		4	–	3	–	1
Saint Mary's		–		4	–	3	–	0
Hawaii		–		3	–	3	–	2
Pacific (CA)		–		3	–	3	–	0
University Farm		–		3	–	4	–	0
New Mexico		–		2	–	2	–	0
New Mexico A&M		–		2	–	2	–	0
Gonzaga		–		2	–	4	–	1
Fresno State		–		2	–	4	–	0
San Jose State		–		1	–	5	–	0

The 1921 Arizona Wildcats football team represented the University of Arizona as an independent during the 1921 college football season. In their seventh season, under head coach Pop McKale, the Wildcats compiled a 7–2 record, shut out six of nine opponents, lost to the Centre Praying Colonels in the East-West Christmas Classic (the program's first bowl game appearance), and outscored all opponents, 418 to 68. The team captain was Walter William Wofford.

Arizona's Harold "Nosey" McClellan led the nation in scoring with 124 points.

== Schedule ==
Date	Opponent	Site	Result	Source
October 8	Bisbee American Legion	Tucson, AZ	W 84–13	
October 15	Phoenix Indian Training School	Tucson, AZ	W 75–0	
October 21	at Texas A&M	Kyle Field; College Station, TX	L 13–17	
October 29	Texas Mines	Tucson, AZ	W 74–0	
November 5	at New Mexico A&M	Mesilla Park, NM	W 31–0	
November 19	at New Mexico	University field; Albuquerque, NM (rivalry)	W 24–0	
November 24	New Mexico Military	Tucson, AZ	W 110–0	
December 2	Whittier	Tucson, AZ	W 7–0	
December 26	vs. Centre	Balboa Stadium; San Diego, CA (East-West Christmas Classic)	L 0–38	

== Game summaries ==
=== Centre (Christmas Classic) ===
In the Christmas Classic (which was a bowl game), Arizona failed to score a single point against Centre in a shutout loss. This was the Wildcats’ first ever bowl game in program history. Arizona did not appear in another bowl game until 1949.
