= 1917 Montana State Bobcats football team =

American college football season

1917 Montana State Bobcats football
- Conference: Rocky Mountain Conference
- Record: 0–2–2 (0–1–2 RMC)
- Head coach: Fred Bennion (4th season)
- Captain: Washington Boberg

1917 Rocky Mountain Conference football standings
	Conf.					Overall
Team	W		L		T	W		L		T
Denver $	6	–	0	–	0	9	–	0	–	0
Utah Agricultural	4	–	0	–	1	7	–	0	–	1
Colorado	4	–	2	–	0	6	–	2	–	0
Colorado Mines	2	–	3	–	0	5	–	3	–	0
Colorado College	2	–	3	–	0	3	–	3	–	0
Utah	2	–	3	–	0	2	–	4	–	0
Wyoming	1	–	4	–	0	3	–	4	–	0
Montana State	0	–	1	–	2	0	–	2	–	2
Colorado Agricultural	0	–	7	–	1	1	–	7	–	1
$ – Conference champion

The 1917 Montana State Bobcats football team was an American football team that represented the Montana State College (later renamed Montana State University) during the 1917 college football season. In its fourth and final season under head coach Fred Bennion, the team compiled a 0–2–2 record and was outscored by a total of 69 to 41.

Montana State was admitted as a member of the Rocky Mountain Conference (RMC) in 1917. The football team's record against conference opponents was 0–1–2.

Washington Boberg was Montana State's 1917 team captain.

== Schedule ==
Date	Opponent	Site	Result	Source
October 6	at Denver	Denver, CO	L 7–33	
October 12	at Colorado Agricultural	Fort Collins, CO	T 20–20	
October 19	Utah Agricultural	Brewer Field; Bozeman, MT	T 7–7	
November 10	at Montana*	Dornblaser Field; Missoula, MT (rivalry)	L 7–9	
*Non-conference game
