= 1916 Colorado Silver and Gold football team =

American college football season

1916 Colorado Silver and Gold football
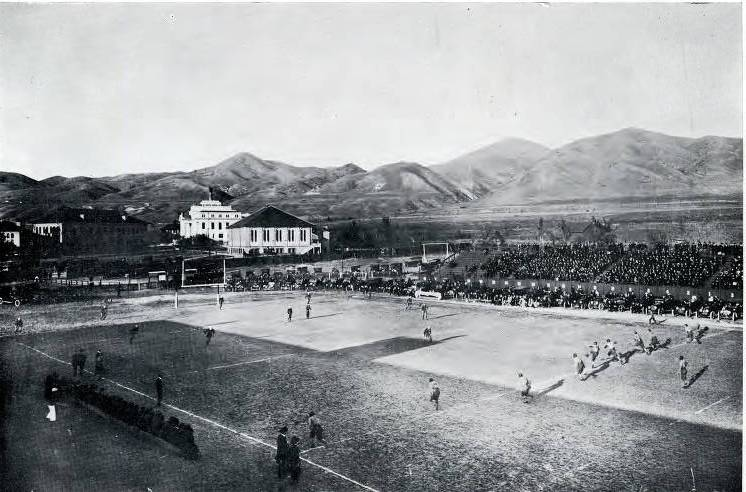
- Utah vs. Colorado 1916
- Conference: Rocky Mountain Conference
- Record: 1–5–1 (1–5 RMC)
- Head coach: Bob Evans (1st season)
- Captain: Elbridge Chapman
- Home stadium: Gamble Field

1916 Rocky Mountain Conference football standings
	Conf.					Overall
Team	W		L		T	W		L		T
Colorado Agricultural $	6	–	0	–	1	6	–	0	–	1
Colorado College	4	–	1	–	0	6	–	1	–	0
Denver	3	–	2	–	0	4	–	2	–	1
Utah	2	–	2	–	0	3	–	2	–	0
Colorado Mines	2	–	2	–	1	3	–	2	–	1
Wyoming	1	–	4	–	0	1	–	4	–	0
Colorado	1	–	5	–	0	1	–	5	–	1
Utah Agricultural	0	–	4	–	0	1	–	5	–	1
$ – Conference champion

The 1916 Colorado Silver and Gold football team was an American football team that represented the University of Colorado as a member of the Rocky Mountain Conference (RMC) during the 1916 college football season. Led by first-year head coach Bob Evans, Colorado compiled an overall record of 1–5–1 with a mark of 1–5 in conference play, placing seventh in the RMC.

== Schedule ==
Date	Opponent	Site	Result	Source
October 7	at Wyoming	Prexy's Pasture; Laramie, WY	W 16–10	
October 14	Colorado alumni*	Gamble Field; Boulder, CO	T 0–0	
October 21	Denver^{†}	Gamble Field; Boulder, CO	L 0–7	
October 28	Utah	Cummings Field; Salt Lake City, UT (rivalry)	L 0–28	
November 10	at Colorado College	Washburn Field; Colorado Springs, CO	L 0–58	
November 18	vs. Colorado Mines	Denver, CO	L 10–27	
November 30	Colorado Agricultural	Gamble Field; Boulder, CO (rivalry)	L 14–32	
*Non-conference game; ^{†}Homecoming
