= 1915 University of Utah football team =

American college football season

1915 University of Utah football
- Conference: Rocky Mountain Conference
- Record: 5–2 (4–2 RMC)
- Head coach: Nelson Norgren (2nd season)
- Home stadium: Cummings Field

1915 Rocky Mountain Conference football standings
	Conf.					Overall
Team	W		L		T	W		L		T
Colorado Agricultural $	7	–	0	–	0	7	–	0	–	0
Utah	4	–	2	–	0	5	–	2	–	0
Colorado Mines	4	–	2	–	0	4	–	2	–	0
Colorado College	3	–	2	–	0	6	–	2	–	0
Denver	2	–	3	–	0	4	–	3	–	0
Wyoming	1	–	5	–	0	2	–	6	–	0
Colorado	1	–	5	–	0	1	–	6	–	0
Utah Agricultural	0	–	3	–	0	3	–	4	–	0
$ – Conference champion

The 1915 University of Utah football team was an American football team that represented the University of Utah as a member of the Rocky Mountain Conference (RMC) during the 1915 college football season. Led by second-year head coach Nelson Norgren, Utah compiled an overall record of 5–3 with a mark of 4–2 in conference play, tying for second place in the RMC.

== Schedule ==
Date	Opponent	Site	Result	Source
October 9	Wyoming	Cummings Field; Salt Lake City, UT	W 70–7	
October 16	Colorado Agricultural	Cummings Field; Salt Lake City, UT	L 9–21	
October 23	Colorado Mines	Cummings Field; Salt Lake City, UT	W 7–0	
October 30	Colorado	Cummings Field; Salt Lake City, UT (rivalry)	W 35–3	
November 6	at Colorado College	Washburn Field; Colorado Springs, CO	L 7–27	
November 20	USC*	Cummings Field; Salt Lake City, UT	W 20–13	
November 25	Utah Agricultural	Cummings Field; Salt Lake City, UT (rivalry)	W 14–0	
*Non-conference game
