= 1921 USC Trojans football team =

American college football season

1921 USC Trojans football
- Conference: Independent
- Record: 10–1
- Head coach: Gus Henderson (3rd season)
- Captain: Charley Dean
- Home stadium: Bovard Field

1921 Western college football independents records
	Conf.			Overall
Team	W	L	T	W		L		T
USC		–		10	–	1	–	0
Arizona		–		7	–	2	–	0
Santa Clara		–		6	–	0	–	0
La Verne		–		4	–	2	–	1
Chico State		–		4	–	3	–	1
Nevada		–		4	–	3	–	1
Saint Mary's		–		4	–	3	–	0
Hawaii		–		3	–	3	–	2
Pacific (CA)		–		3	–	3	–	0
University Farm		–		3	–	4	–	0
New Mexico		–		2	–	2	–	0
New Mexico A&M		–		2	–	2	–	0
Gonzaga		–		2	–	4	–	1
Fresno State		–		2	–	4	–	0
San Jose State		–		1	–	5	–	0

The 1921 USC Trojans football team represented the University of Southern California (USC) as an independent during the 1921 college football season. In their third year under head coach Gus Henderson, the Trojans compiled a 10–1 record and outscored their opponents by a combined total of 362 to 52.

== Schedule ==
Date	Opponent	Site	Result	Attendance	Source
October 1	USS Arizona	Bovard Field; Los Angeles, CA	W 62–0		
October 1	USS New York	Bovard Field; Los Angeles, CA	W 35–0		
October 8	Caltech	Bovard Field; Los Angeles, CA	W 70–0		
October 12	Sub Base	Bovard Field; Los Angeles, CA	W 34–0		
October 15	at Occidental	Los Angeles, CA	W 42–0		
October 19	at Sub Base		W 28–0	10,000	
October 29	Pomona	Bovard Field; Los Angeles, CA	W 35–7	6,000	
November 5	at California	California Field; Berkeley, CA	L 7–38	30,000	
November 19	Whittier	Bovard Field; Los Angeles, CA	W 14–0	12,000	
November 26	Oregon Agricultural	Tournament Park; Pasadena, CA	W 7–0	17,500	
December 3	Washington State	Tournament Park; Pasadena, CA	W 28–7	18,000	
