= 1914 Wyoming Cowboys football team =

American college football season

1914 Wyoming Cowboys football
- Conference: Rocky Mountain Conference
- Record: 1–5 (0–5 RMC)
- Head coach: Ralph Thacker (2nd season)
- Captain: None

1914 Rocky Mountain Conference football standings
| | Conf. | | | | | Overall |
| Team | W | | L | | T | W | | L | | T |
|---|---|---|---|---|---|---|---|---|---|---|
| Colorado Mines $ | 5 | – | 0 | – | 1 | 5 | – | 0 | – | 1 |
| Colorado | 4 | – | 1 | – | 0 | 5 | – | 1 | – | 0 |
| Colorado College | 3 | – | 1 | – | 1 | 4 | – | 1 | – | 1 |
| Colorado Agricultural | 3 | – | 3 | – | 0 | 3 | – | 4 | – | 0 |
| Utah | 2 | – | 3 | – | 0 | 3 | – | 3 | – | 0 |
| Utah Agricultural | 1 | – | 2 | – | 0 | 2 | – | 5 | – | 0 |
| Denver | 1 | – | 4 | – | 0 | 5 | – | 4 | – | 0 |
| Wyoming | 0 | – | 5 | – | 0 | 1 | – | 5 | – | 0 |
$ – Conference champion

The 1914 Wyoming Cowboys football team was an American football team that represented the University of Wyoming as a member of the Rocky Mountain Conference (RMC) during the 1914 college football season. In their second and final season under head coach Ralph Thacker, the Cowboys compiled a 1–5 record (0–5 against conference opponents), finished last out of eight teams in the RMC, and were outscored by a total of 158 to 31.

== Schedule ==
| Date | Opponent | Site | Result | Source |
|---|---|---|---|---|
| September 30 | Cheyenne High School* | Laramie, WY | W 18–10 | |
| October 10 | at Utah | Cummings Field; Salt Lake City, UT | L 0–20 | |
| October 17 | Colorado Mines | Laramie, WY | L 0–25 | |
| October 24 | Colorado Agricultural | Laramie, WY (rivalry) | L 10–48 | |
| November 7 | at Utah Agricultural | Adams Field; Logan, UT (rivalry) | L 3–24 | |
| November 21 | Denver | Laramie, WY | L 0–31 | |
*Non-conference game
