= 1913 University of Utah football team =

American college football season

1913 University of Utah football
- Conference: Rocky Mountain Conference
- Record: 2–4–1 (1–2 RMC)
- Head coach: Fred Bennion (4th season)
- Home stadium: Cummings Field

1913 Rocky Mountain Conference football standings
	Conf.					Overall
Team	W		L		T	W		L		T
Colorado $	4	–	0	–	1	5	–	1	–	1
Colorado Mines	5	–	1	–	0	5	–	1	–	0
Colorado College	2	–	2	–	1	5	–	2	–	1
Colorado Agricultural $	2	–	2	–	0	3	–	2	–	0
Utah	1	–	2	–	0	2	–	4	–	1
Denver	1	–	3	–	0	2	–	5	–	0
Wyoming	0	–	5	–	0	0	–	5	–	0
$ – Conference champion

The 1913 University of Utah football team was an American football team that represented the University of Utah as a member of the Rocky Mountain Conference during the 1913 college football season. Led by Fred Bennion in his fifth in the final season as head coach, Utah compiled an overall record of 2–4–1 with a mark of 1–2 in conference play, placing fifth in the RMC.

== Schedule ==
Date	Time	Opponent	Site	Result	Source
October 11		Fort Douglas*	Cummings Field; Salt Lake City, UT	W 89–6	
October 18		at Colorado College	Washburn Field; Colorado Springs, CO	W 7–6	
October 25		Colorado Mines	Cummings Field; Salt Lake City, UT	L 0–7	
November 8		Colorado	Cummings Field; Salt Lake City, UT (rivalry)	L 12–30	
November 15		at Occidental*	Baer Field; Los Angeles, CA	L 14–26	
November 19	3:30 p.m.	at Pomona*	Alumni Field; Claremont, CA	T 7–7	
November 27		at Utah Agricultural*	Adams Field; Logan, UT (rivalry)	L 0–21	
*Non-conference game; All times are in Mountain time
