= 1913 Colorado Agricultural Aggies football team =

American college football season

1913 Colorado Agricultural Aggies football
- Conference: Rocky Mountain Conference
- Record: 3–2 (2–2 RMC)
- Head coach: Harry W. Hughes (3rd season)
- Home stadium: Colorado Field

1913 Rocky Mountain Conference football standings
	Conf.					Overall
Team	W		L		T	W		L		T
Colorado $	4	–	0	–	1	5	–	1	–	1
Colorado Mines	5	–	1	–	0	5	–	1	–	0
Colorado College	2	–	2	–	1	5	–	2	–	1
Colorado Agricultural $	2	–	2	–	0	3	–	2	–	0
Utah	1	–	2	–	0	2	–	4	–	1
Denver	1	–	3	–	0	2	–	5	–	0
Wyoming	0	–	5	–	0	0	–	5	–	0
$ – Conference champion

The 1913 Colorado Agricultural Aggies football team represented Colorado Agricultural College (now known as Colorado State University) in the Rocky Mountain Conference (RMC) during the 1913 college football season. In their third season under head coach Harry W. Hughes, the Aggies compiled a 3–2 record and outscored opponents by a total of 115 to 43.

== Schedule ==
Date	Opponent	Site	Result	Source
October 18	at Denver	Denver, CO	W 20–6	
October 25	at Colorado	Gamble Field; Boulder, CO (rivalry)	L 7–16	
November 1	Colorado Mines	Colorado Field; Fort Collins, CO	L 7–14	
November 8	Utah Agricultural*	Colorado Field; Fort Collins, CO	W 20–7	
November 27	Wyoming	Colorado Field; Fort Collins, CO (rivalry)	W 61–0	
*Non-conference game
