= 1916 University of Utah football team =

American college football season

1916 University of Utah football
- Conference: Rocky Mountain Conference
- Record: 3–2 (2–2 RMC)
- Head coach: Nelson Norgren (3rd season)
- Home stadium: Cummings Field

1916 Rocky Mountain Conference football standings
	Conf.					Overall
Team	W		L		T	W		L		T
Colorado Agricultural $	6	–	0	–	1	6	–	0	–	1
Colorado College	4	–	1	–	0	6	–	1	–	0
Denver	3	–	2	–	0	4	–	2	–	1
Utah	2	–	2	–	0	3	–	2	–	0
Colorado Mines	2	–	2	–	1	3	–	2	–	1
Wyoming	1	–	4	–	0	1	–	4	–	0
Colorado	1	–	5	–	0	1	–	5	–	1
Utah Agricultural	0	–	4	–	0	1	–	5	–	1
$ – Conference champion

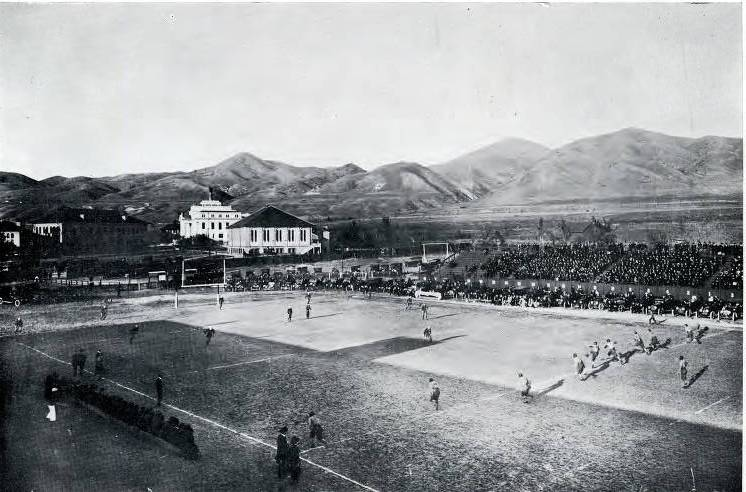
Kickoff during the 1916 Colorado – Utah game

The 1916 University of Utah football team was an American football team that represented the University of Utah as a member of the Rocky Mountain Conference (RMC) during the 1916 college football season. Led by third-year head coach Nelson Norgren, Utah compiled an overall record of 3–2 with a mark of 2–2 in conference play, tying for fourth place in the RMC.

== Schedule ==
Date	Opponent	Site	Result	Attendance	Source
October 21	at USC*	Fiesta Park; Los Angeles, CA	W 27–12	2,000	
October 28	Colorado	Cummings Field; Salt Lake City, UT (rivalry)	W 28–0		
November 11	Utah Agricultural	Cummings Field; Salt Lake City, UT (rivalry)	W 46–0		
November 18	at Colorado Agricultural	Colorado Field; Fort Collins, CO	L 6–12		
November 30	Colorado College	Cummings Field; Salt Lake City, UT	L 6–21		
*Non-conference game
