= 1913 Wyoming Cowboys football team =

American college football season

1913 Wyoming Cowboys football
- Conference: Rocky Mountain Conference
- Record: 0–5 (0–5 RMC)
- Head coach: Ralph Thacker (1st season)
- Captain: Harry Rogers

1913 Rocky Mountain Conference football standings
	Conf.					Overall
Team	W		L		T	W		L		T
Colorado $	4	–	0	–	1	5	–	1	–	1
Colorado Mines	5	–	1	–	0	5	–	1	–	0
Colorado College	2	–	2	–	1	5	–	2	–	1
Colorado Agricultural $	2	–	2	–	0	3	–	2	–	0
Utah	1	–	2	–	0	2	–	4	–	1
Denver	1	–	3	–	0	2	–	5	–	0
Wyoming	0	–	5	–	0	0	–	5	–	0
$ – Conference champion

The 1913 Wyoming Cowboys football team was an American football team that represented the University of Wyoming as a member of the Rocky Mountain Conference (RMC) during the 1913 college football season. In their first season under head coach Ralph Thacker, the Cowboys compiled a 0–5 record with all games against conference opponents, finishing last out of seven teams in the RMC. The team failed to score a single point and was outscored by a total of 183 to 0. Harry Rogers was the team captain.

== Schedule ==
Date	Opponent	Site	Result	Source
October 4	at Colorado	Gamble Field; Boulder, CO	L 0–7	
October 11	at Colorado College	Washburn Field; Colorado Springs, CO	L 0–49	
October 18	Colorado Mines	Laramie, WY	L 0–40	
November 8	Denver	Laramie, WY	L 0–26	
November 27	at Colorado Agricultural	Colorado Field; Fort Collins, CO (rivalry)	L 0–61	
