= 1921 Chico State Wildcats football team =

American college football season

1921 Chico State Wildcats football
- Conference: Independent
- Record: 4–3–1
- Head coach: George Sperry (1st season)
- Home stadium: College Field

1921 Western college football independents records
	Conf.			Overall
Team	W	L	T	W		L		T
USC		–		10	–	1	–	0
Arizona		–		7	–	2	–	0
Santa Clara		–		6	–	0	–	0
La Verne		–		4	–	2	–	1
Chico State		–		4	–	3	–	1
Nevada		–		4	–	3	–	1
Saint Mary's		–		4	–	3	–	0
Hawaii		–		3	–	3	–	2
Pacific (CA)		–		3	–	3	–	0
University Farm		–		3	–	4	–	0
New Mexico		–		2	–	2	–	0
New Mexico A&M		–		2	–	2	–	0
Gonzaga		–		2	–	4	–	1
Fresno State		–		2	–	4	–	0
San Jose State		–		1	–	5	–	0

The 1921 Chico State Wildcats football team represented Chico State Teachers College—now known as California State University, Chico—as an independent during the 1921 college football season. They became a charter member of the California Coast Conference (CCC) in 1922. Led by first-year head coach George Sperry, Chico State compiled a record of 4–3–1. The team played home games at College Field in Chico, California.

== Schedule ==
Date	Opponent	Site	Result	Attendance	Source
October 1	Marysville High School	College Field; Chico, CA	W 46–0		
October 15	Saint Mary's freshmen	College Field; Chico, CA	T 0–0		
October 22	at Sacramento High School	Buffalo Park; Sacramento, CA	W 14–7		
October 29	Willows High School	Chico, CA	L 0–21		
November 5	at Fresno State	Speedway field; Fresno, CA	W 3–0		
November 11	American Legion (Chico)	Chico, CA	L 9–13	2,000	
November 18	Pacific (CA)	Stockton, CA	L 0–28		
November 24	Chico High School	College Field; Chico, CA	W 20–7	600–2,000	
