= 1921 New Mexico A&M Aggies football team =

American college football season

1921 New Mexico A&M Aggies football
- Conference: Independent
- Record: 2–2
- Head coach: Dutch Bergman (2nd season)
- Home stadium: Miller Field

1921 Western college football independents records
	Conf.			Overall
Team	W	L	T	W		L		T
USC		–		10	–	1	–	0
Arizona		–		7	–	2	–	0
Santa Clara		–		6	–	0	–	0
La Verne		–		4	–	2	–	1
Chico State		–		4	–	3	–	1
Nevada		–		4	–	3	–	1
Saint Mary's		–		4	–	3	–	0
Hawaii		–		3	–	3	–	2
Pacific (CA)		–		3	–	3	–	0
University Farm		–		3	–	4	–	0
New Mexico		–		2	–	2	–	0
New Mexico A&M		–		2	–	2	–	0
Gonzaga		–		2	–	4	–	1
Fresno State		–		2	–	4	–	0
San Jose State		–		1	–	5	–	0

The 1921 New Mexico A&M Aggies football team was an American football team that represented New Mexico College of Agriculture and Mechanical Arts (now known as New Mexico State University) during the 1921 college football season. In their second year under head coach Dutch Bergman, the Aggies compiled a 2–2 record. The team played home games on Miller Field.

== Schedule ==
Date	Opponent	Site	Result	Attendance	Source
October 8	El Paso High School (exhibition)		W 46–0		
October 15	Texas Athletic (exhibition)		W 35–0		
October 21	New Mexico Military		W 32–0		
November 5	Arizona	Mesilla Park, NM	L 0–31		
November 11	at Texas Mines	El Paso, TX (rivalry)	W 13–0		
November 24	at New Mexico	University field; Albuquerque, NM (rivalry)	L 0–6		
