= 1921 Hawaii Deans football team =

American college football season

1921 Hawaii Deans football
- Conference: Independent
- Record: 3–3–2
- Head coach: Otto Klum (1st season)
- Captain: Robert Spencer
- Home stadium: Moiliili Field

1921 Western college football independents records
	Conf.			Overall
Team	W	L	T	W		L		T
USC		–		10	–	1	–	0
Arizona		–		7	–	2	–	0
Santa Clara		–		6	–	0	–	0
La Verne		–		4	–	2	–	1
Chico State		–		4	–	3	–	1
Nevada		–		4	–	3	–	1
Saint Mary's		–		4	–	3	–	0
Hawaii		–		3	–	3	–	2
Pacific (CA)		–		3	–	3	–	0
University Farm		–		3	–	4	–	0
New Mexico		–		2	–	2	–	0
New Mexico A&M		–		2	–	2	–	0
Gonzaga		–		2	–	4	–	1
Fresno State		–		2	–	4	–	0
San Jose State		–		1	–	5	–	0

The 1921 Hawaii Deans football team represented the University of Hawaiʻi (now known as the University of Hawaiʻi at Mānoa) as an independent during the 1921 college football season. Led by first-year head coach Otto Klum, the Deans compiled an overall record of 3–3–2. Robert Spencer was the team captain.

== Schedule ==
Date	Opponent	Site	Result	Attendance	Source
October 8	Honolulu Athletic Club	Moiliili Field; Honolulu, Territory of Hawaii	L 6–7	2,000	
October 14	Hawaii Marines	Moiliili Field; Honolulu, Territory of Hawaii	T 0–0		
October 29	Hawaii National Guard	Moiliili Field; Honolulu, Territory of Hawaii	W 29–7		
November 5	Pearl Harbor Navy	Moiliili Field; Honolulu, Territory of Hawaii	L 0–35		
November 11	Pālama	Moiliili Field; Honolulu, Territory of Hawaii	W 13–6		
November 26	Outrigger Canoe Club	Moiliili Field; Honolulu, Territory of Hawaii	T 12–12		
December 3	Honolulu Town Team	Moiliili Field; Honolulu, Territory of Hawaii	W 7–0		
December 26	Oregon	Moiliili Field; Honolulu, Territory of Hawaii	L 0–47		
