= 1913 University of New Mexico football team =

American college football season

1913 University of New Mexico football
- Conference: Independent
- Record: 3–2
- Head coach: Ralph Hutchinson (3rd season)
- Home stadium: Association park field

1913 Western college football independents records
	Conf.			Overall
Team	W	L	T	W		L		T
New Mexico A&M		–		7	–	0	–	1
Utah Agricultural		–		3	–	3	–	0
New Mexico		–		3	–	2	–	0
Arizona		–		2	–	2	–	0
Montana A&M		–		2	–	2	–	0
Montana		–		2	–	4	–	0
Cheney Normal		–		1	–	5	–	0

The 1913 University of New Mexico football team was an American football team that represented the University of New Mexico as an independent during the 1913 college football season. In its third season under head coach Ralph Hutchinson (who was also the university's first athletic director), the team compiled a 3–2 record and outscored opponents by a total of 84 to 27. Halfback Fred "Fritz" Calkins was the team captain.

== Schedule ==
Date	Opponent	Site	Result	Source
October 18	Menaul School	Albuquerque, NM	W 28–0	
October 25	Albuquerque Indian School	Association park field; Albuquerque, NM	W 44–0	
October 31	New Mexico Military	Association park field; Albuquerque, NM	W 9–7	
November 14	at New Mexico A&M	Miller Field; Las Cruces, NM (rivalry)	L 0–13	
November 27	Arizona	Association park field; Albuquerque, NM (rivalry)	L 3–7	
