= 1916 Utah Agricultural Aggies football team =

American college football season

1916 Utah Agricultural Aggies football
- Conference: Rocky Mountain Conference
- Record: 1–5–1 (0–4 RMC)
- Head coach: Jack Watson (1st season)
- Home stadium: Adams Field

1916 Rocky Mountain Conference football standings
	Conf.					Overall
Team	W		L		T	W		L		T
Colorado Agricultural $	6	–	0	–	1	6	–	0	–	1
Colorado College	4	–	1	–	0	6	–	1	–	0
Denver	3	–	2	–	0	4	–	2	–	1
Utah	2	–	2	–	0	3	–	2	–	0
Colorado Mines	2	–	2	–	1	3	–	2	–	1
Wyoming	1	–	4	–	0	1	–	4	–	0
Colorado	1	–	5	–	0	1	–	5	–	1
Utah Agricultural	0	–	4	–	0	1	–	5	–	1
$ – Conference champion

The 1916 Utah Agricultural Aggies football team was an American football team that represented Utah Agricultural College (later renamed Utah State University) in the Rocky Mountain Conference (RMC) during the 1916 college football season. In their first season under head coach Jack Watson, the Aggies compiled a 1–5–1 record (0–4 against RMC opponents) and were outscored by a total of 178 to 69.

== Schedule ==
Date	Opponent	Site	Result	Source
October 7	West Logan High*	Adams Field; Logan, UT	W 20–3	
October 14	Colorado Agricultural	Adams Field; Logan, UT	L 0–53	
October 21	Wyoming	Adams Field; Logan, UT	L 10–23	
October 28	at Nevada*	Mackay Field; Reno, NV	L 7–9	
November 11	at Utah	Cummings Field; Salt Lake City, UT	L 0–46	
November 18	Montana State*	Adams Field; Logan, UT	T 17–17	
November 30	Idaho*	Adams Field; Logan, UT	L 15–27	
*Non-conference game
