= 1913 Cheney Normal football team =

American college football season

1913 Cheney Normal football
- Conference: Independent
- Record: 1–5
- Head coach: Albert Fertsch (1st season)

1913 Western college football independents records
	Conf.			Overall
Team	W	L	T	W		L		T
New Mexico A&M		–		7	–	0	–	1
Utah Agricultural		–		3	–	3	–	0
New Mexico		–		3	–	2	–	0
Arizona		–		2	–	2	–	0
Montana A&M		–		2	–	2	–	0
Montana		–		2	–	4	–	0
Cheney Normal		–		1	–	5	–	0

The 1913 Cheney Normal football team represented the State Normal School at Cheney—now known as Eastern Washington University—as an independent during the 1913 college football season. Led by first-year head coach Albert Fertsch, Cheney Normal compiled a record of 1–5.

== Schedule ==
Date	Time	Opponent	Site	Result	Source
October 7		vs. Cheney Normal juniors	Cheney, WA	W 3–0	
October		vs. Cheney Normal juniors	Cheney, WA	L 2–14	
November 1	10:00 a.m.	at Gonzaga J. Y. A.	Gonzaga Field; Spokane, WA	L 4–39	
November 7		at Rosalia High School		L 0–31	
November 20		Gonzaga J. Y. A.	Cheney, WA	L 7–19	
		Gonzaga		L 4–39	
