= 1913 Colorado Mines Orediggers football team =

American college football season

1913 Colorado Mines Orediggers football
- Conference: Rocky Mountain Conference
- Record: 5–1 (5–1 RMC)
- Head coach: Harry G. Buckingham (1st season) & Erle Kristler (2nd season)

1913 Rocky Mountain Conference football standings
	Conf.					Overall
Team	W		L		T	W		L		T
Colorado $	4	–	0	–	1	5	–	1	–	1
Colorado Mines	5	–	1	–	0	5	–	1	–	0
Colorado College	2	–	2	–	1	5	–	2	–	1
Colorado Agricultural $	2	–	2	–	0	3	–	2	–	0
Utah	1	–	2	–	0	2	–	4	–	1
Denver	1	–	3	–	0	2	–	5	–	0
Wyoming	0	–	5	–	0	0	–	5	–	0
$ – Conference champion

The 1913 Colorado Mines Orediggers football team was an American football team that represented the Colorado School of Mines in the Rocky Mountain Conference (RMC) during the 1913 college football season. The team compiled a 5–1 record and outscored opponents by a total of 127 to 47.

== Schedule ==
Date	Opponent	Site	Result	Attendance	Source
October 18	at Wyoming	Laramie, WY	W 40–0		
October 25	at Utah	Cummings Field; Salt Lake City, UT	W 7–0		
November 1	at Colorado Agricultural	Colorado Field; Fort Collins, CO	W 14–7		
November 8	vs. Colorado College	Denver, CO	W 17–13		
November 15	Colorado	Athletic Park; Golden, CO	L 0–20		
November 27	Denver	Golden, CO	W 49–7		
