= 1913 Arizona football team =

American college football season

1913 Arizona football
- Conference: Independent
- Record: 2–2
- Head coach: Frank A. King (1st season)
- Captain: Jay Angus McIntosh

1913 Western college football independents records
| | Conf. | | | Overall |
| Team | W | L | T | W | | L | | T |
|---|---|---|---|---|---|---|---|---|
| New Mexico A&M | | – | | 7 | – | 0 | – | 1 |
| Utah Agricultural | | – | | 3 | – | 3 | – | 0 |
| New Mexico | | – | | 3 | – | 2 | – | 0 |
| Arizona | | – | | 2 | – | 2 | – | 0 |
| Montana A&M | | – | | 2 | – | 2 | – | 0 |
| Montana | | – | | 2 | – | 4 | – | 0 |
| Cheney Normal | | – | | 1 | – | 5 | – | 0 |

The 1913 Arizona football team was an American football team that represented the University of Arizona as an independent during the 1913 college football season. In its first and only season under head coach Frank A. King, the team compiled a 2–2 record and was outscored by their opponents, 42 to 25. The team captain was Jay Angus McIntosh.

== Schedule ==
| Date | Opponent | Site | Result | Source |
|---|---|---|---|---|
| October 25 | New Mexico A&M | Tucson, AZ | L 6–12 | |
| November 1 | at Phoenix Indian School | Indian School Grounds; Phoenix, AZ | W 12–0 | |
| November 8 | Occidental | Tucson, AZ | L 0–27 | |
| November 27 | at New Mexico | Association park field; Albuquerque, NM (rivalry) | W 7–3 | |
