= 1914 University of Utah football team =

American college football season

1914 University of Utah football
- Conference: Rocky Mountain Conference
- Record: 3–3 (2–3 RMC)
- Head coach: Nelson Norgren (1st season)
- Home stadium: Cummings Field

1914 Rocky Mountain Conference football standings
	Conf.					Overall
Team	W		L		T	W		L		T
Colorado Mines $	5	–	0	–	1	5	–	0	–	1
Colorado	4	–	1	–	0	5	–	1	–	0
Colorado College	3	–	1	–	1	4	–	1	–	1
Colorado Agricultural	3	–	3	–	0	3	–	4	–	0
Utah	2	–	3	–	0	3	–	3	–	0
Utah Agricultural	1	–	2	–	0	2	–	5	–	0
Denver	1	–	4	–	0	5	–	4	–	0
Wyoming	0	–	5	–	0	1	–	5	–	0
$ – Conference champion

The 1914 University of Utah football team was an American football team that represented the University of Utah as a member of the Rocky Mountain Conference (RMC) during the 1914 college football season. Led by first-year head coach Nelson Norgren, Utah compiled an overall record of 3–3 with a mark of 2–3 in conference play, placing fifth in the RMC.

== Schedule ==
Date	Opponent	Site	Result
October 10	Wyoming	Cummings Field; Salt Lake City, UT	W 20–0
October 17	Colorado College	Cummings Field; Salt Lake City, UT	L 7–46
October 24	Colorado Mines	Brooks Field; Golden, CO	L 6–13
November 7	at Colorado	Gamble Field; Boulder, CO (rivalry)	L 0–33
November 14	Occidental*	Cummings Field; Salt Lake City, UT	W 34–14
November 26	Utah Agricultural	Cummings Field; Salt Lake City, UT (rivalry)	W 20–2
*Non-conference game
