= 1913 Montana A&M football team =

American college football season

1913 Montana A&M football
- Conference: Independent
- Record: 2–2
- Head coach: Eugene F. Bunker (1st season)
- Captain: Edward Noble
- Home stadium: Fairgrounds

1913 Western college football independents records
	Conf.			Overall
Team	W	L	T	W		L		T
New Mexico A&M		–		7	–	0	–	1
Utah Agricultural		–		3	–	3	–	0
New Mexico		–		3	–	2	–	0
Arizona		–		2	–	2	–	0
Montana A&M		–		2	–	2	–	0
Montana		–		2	–	4	–	0
Cheney Normal		–		1	–	5	–	0

The 1913 Montana A&M football team was an American football team that represented the Montana College of Agriculture and Mechanic Arts (later renamed Montana State University) during the 1913 college football season. In its first and only season under head coach Eugene F. Bunker, the team compiled a 2–2 record and outscored opponents by a total of 45 to 33. Edward Noble was the team captain.

== Schedule ==
Date	Opponent	Site	Result	Source
October 15	Anaconda Independents	Fairgrounds; Bozeman, MT	W 32–6	
October 28	Utah Agricultural	Fairgrounds; Bozeman, MT	W 13–0	
November 1	Montana	Fairgrounds; Bozeman, MT (rivalry)	L 0–7	
November 14	at Montana	Dornblaser Field; Missoula, MT	L 0–20	
