= 1914 Utah Agricultural Aggies football team =

American college football season

1914 Utah Agricultural Aggies football
- Conference: Rocky Mountain Conference
- Record: 2–5 (1–2 RMC)
- Head coach: Clayton Teetzel (6th season)
- Home stadium: Adams Field

1914 Rocky Mountain Conference football standings
	Conf.					Overall
Team	W		L		T	W		L		T
Colorado Mines $	5	–	0	–	1	5	–	0	–	1
Colorado	4	–	1	–	0	5	–	1	–	0
Colorado College	3	–	1	–	1	4	–	1	–	1
Colorado Agricultural	3	–	3	–	0	3	–	4	–	0
Utah	2	–	3	–	0	3	–	3	–	0
Utah Agricultural	1	–	2	–	0	2	–	5	–	0
Denver	1	–	4	–	0	5	–	4	–	0
Wyoming	0	–	5	–	0	1	–	5	–	0
$ – Conference champion

The 1914 Utah Agricultural Aggies football team was an American football team that represented Utah Agricultural College (later renamed Utah State University) in the Rocky Mountain Conference (RMC) during the 1914 college football season. In their sixth season under head coach Clayton Teetzel, the Aggies compiled a 2–5 record (1–2 against RMC opponents), finished sixth in the RMC, and were outscored by a total of 208 to 56.

== Schedule ==
Date	Opponent	Site	Result	Source
October 10	Utah Agricultural alumni*	Adams Field; Logan, UT	W 20–0	
October 17	Montana State*	Adams Field; Logan, UT	L 3–52	
October 24	at Gonzaga*	Spokane, WA	L 0–60	
October 31	at Montana*	Dornblaser Field; Missoula, MT	L 0–32	
November 7	Wyoming	Adams Field; Logan, UT (rivalry)	W 24–3	
November 14	Colorado Agricultural	Adams Field; Logan, UT	L 7–41	
November 26	at Utah	Cummings Field; Salt Lake City, UT (rivalry)	L 2–20	
*Non-conference game
