= 1917 University of Utah football team =

American college football season

1917 University of Utah football
- Conference: Rocky Mountain Conference
- Record: 2–4 (2–3 RMC)
- Head coach: Nelson Norgren (4th season)
- Home stadium: Cummings Field

1917 Rocky Mountain Conference football standings
	Conf.					Overall
Team	W		L		T	W		L		T
Denver $	6	–	0	–	0	9	–	0	–	0
Utah Agricultural	4	–	0	–	0	7	–	0	–	1
Colorado	4	–	2	–	0	6	–	2	–	0
Colorado Mines	2	–	3	–	0	5	–	3	–	0
Colorado College	2	–	3	–	0	3	–	3	–	0
Utah	2	–	3	–	0	2	–	4	–	0
Wyoming	1	–	4	–	0	3	–	4	–	0
Montana State	0	–	1	–	2	0	–	2	–	2
Colorado Agricultural	0	–	7	–	1	1	–	7	–	1
$ – Conference champion

The 1917 University of Utah football team was an American football team that represented the University of Utah as a member of the Rocky Mountain Conference (RMC) during the 1915 college football season. Led by Nelson Norgren in his fourth and final season as head coach, Utah compiled an overall record of 2–4 with a mark of 2–3 in conference play, tying for fourth place in the RMC.

== Schedule ==
Date	Time	Opponent	Site	Result	Source
October 20		Wyoming	Cummings Field; Salt Lake City, UT	W 14–0	
October 27		at Colorado College	Washburn Field; Colorado Springs, CO	L 0–21	
November 3		Colorado Agricultural	Cummings Field; Salt Lake City, UT	W 25–12	
November 10		at Colorado	Gamble Field; Boulder, CO (rivalry)	L 9–18	
November 17	3:00 p.m.	USC*	Cummings Field; Salt Lake City, UT	L 0–51	
November 29		Utah Agricultural	Cummings Field; Salt Lake City, UT (rivalry)	L 0–14	
*Non-conference game
