= 1921 San Jose State Spartans football team =

American college football season

1921 San Jose State Spartans football
- Conference: Independent
- Record: 1–5
- Head coach: David Wooster (1st season)
- Home stadium: Spartan Field

1921 Western college football independents records
	Conf.			Overall
Team	W	L	T	W		L		T
USC		–		10	–	1	–	0
Arizona		–		7	–	2	–	0
Santa Clara		–		6	–	0	–	0
La Verne		–		4	–	2	–	1
Chico State		–		4	–	3	–	1
Nevada		–		4	–	3	–	1
Saint Mary's		–		4	–	3	–	0
Hawaii		–		3	–	3	–	2
Pacific (CA)		–		3	–	3	–	0
University Farm		–		3	–	4	–	0
New Mexico		–		2	–	2	–	0
New Mexico A&M		–		2	–	2	–	0
Gonzaga		–		2	–	4	–	1
Fresno State		–		2	–	4	–	0
San Jose State		–		1	–	5	–	0

The 1921 San Jose State Spartans football team represented State Teachers College at San Jose (Note: San Jose State University was known as State Teachers College at San Jose from 1921 to 1934.) during the 1921 college football season.

This was the first season of intercollegiate football for San Jose State since 1900. The 1921 team was led by head coach David Wooster, and they played home games at Spartan Field in San Jose, California. The team finished the season with a record of one win and five losses (1–5). The Spartans were outscored by their opponents 35–141 for the season. In 1922, they became a charter member of the California Coast Conference (CCC).

== Schedule ==
Date	Time	Opponent	Site	Result	Attendance	Source
October 21		San Jose High School	Spartan Field; San Jose, CA	L 7–20		
October 28?		Santa Clara High School	Spartan Field; San Jose, CA	L 0–48		
November 4		at Pacific (CA)	C.O.P. Field; College Park, San Jose, CA (rivalry)	L 0–34		
November 11		San Jose High School	Spartan Field; San Jose, CA	L 0–7	4,000	
November 18		at Fresno State	Fresno, CA (rivalry)	W 14–2		
November 24	2:30 p.m.	at San Benito High School	Hollister, CA	L 14–30		
All times are in Pacific time
