= 1915 Colorado Agricultural Aggies football team =

American college football season

1915 Colorado Agricultural Aggies football

RMC champion
- Conference: Rocky Mountain Conference
- Record: 7–0 (7–0 RMC)
- Head coach: Harry W. Hughes (5th season)
- Home stadium: Colorado Field

1915 Rocky Mountain Conference football standings
	Conf.					Overall
Team	W		L		T	W		L		T
Colorado Agricultural $	7	–	0	–	0	7	–	0	–	0
Utah	4	–	2	–	0	5	–	2	–	0
Colorado Mines	4	–	2	–	0	4	–	2	–	0
Colorado College	3	–	2	–	0	6	–	2	–	0
Denver	2	–	3	–	0	4	–	3	–	0
Wyoming	1	–	5	–	0	2	–	6	–	0
Colorado	1	–	5	–	0	1	–	6	–	0
Utah Agricultural	0	–	3	–	0	3	–	4	–	0
$ – Conference champion

The 1915 Colorado Agricultural Aggies football team represented Colorado Agricultural College (now known as Colorado State University) in the Rocky Mountain Conference (RMC) during the 1915 college football season. In their fifth season under head coach Harry W. Hughes, the Aggies compiled a perfect 7–0 record, won the RMC championship, and outscored all opponents by a total of 244 to 31.

Three Colorado Agricultural players received all-conference honors in 1915: guard Frank Wilson, center Charles Shepardson, and end Ralph (Sag) Robinson.

The 1915 team remains the only team in school history to compile a perfect season.

== Schedule ==
Date	Opponent	Site	Result	Source
October 9	at Colorado	Gamble Field; Boulder, CO (rivalry)	W 28–6	
October 16	at Utah	Cummings Field; Salt Lake City, UT	W 21–9	
October 23	Utah Agricultural	Colorado Field; Fort Collins, CO	W 59–0	
October 30	Colorado Mines	Colorado Field; Fort Collins, CO	W 35–0	
November 6	at Wyoming	Laramie, WY (rivalry)	W 48–0	
November 13	at Colorado College	Washburn Field; Colorado Springs, CO	W 24–13	
November 25	Denver	Colorado Field; Fort Collins, CO	W 34–3	
