= Nelson Norgren =

American athlete and coach (1891–1974)

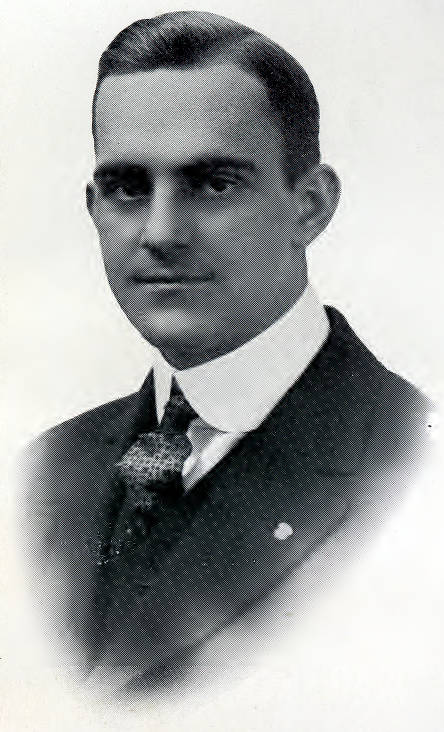
- Norgren in 1917

Biographical details
- Born: September 10, 1891
- Died: December 31, 1974 (aged 83); Mill Valley, California, U.S.

Playing career
- 1910–1914: Chicago

Coaching career (HC unless noted)

Football
- 1914–1917: Utah
- 1921–?: Chicago (assistant)

Basketball
- 1914–1917: Utah
- 1921–1942: Chicago
- 1944–1957: Chicago

Baseball
- 1915–1916: Utah
- 1922–1926: Chicago
- 1930: Chicago

Head coaching record
- Overall: 13–11 (football); 209–440 (basketball); 33–60–1 (baseball)

Accomplishments and honors

Awards
- 2× Second-team All-American (1912, 1913); First-team All-Western (1913)

Nelson H. Norgren (September 10, 1891 – December 31, 1974) was an American football, basketball, and baseball player and coach. As a coach, he led the University of Utah to a national AAU basketball championship in 1916. He later served as the basketball coach at the University of Chicago from 1921 to 1957.

== Playing career ==
A native of Chicago, Illinois, Norgren graduated from North Division High School in 1910. He attended the University of Chicago, where he played football, basketball, track, and baseball, winning 12 letters. He played football for Amos Alonzo Stagg. He was named to Walter Camp's College Football All-America Teams in 1912 (second-team) and 1913 (third-team).

== Coaching career ==
=== Football coach ===
Norgren was the head coach of football at Utah from 1914 through 1917. While there, he accumulated a record of 13–11 (.542).

=== Basketball coach ===
In 1914, Nelson became the athletic director and basketball coach at the University of Utah. His team won the 1916 AAU national championship. In 1917, he coached Brigham Young University to a second-place finish in the 1917 AAU tournament.

In 1921, Norgren was hired by his former coach, Amos Alonzo Stagg, as the University of Chicago's assistant football coach and head basketball coach. He also coached the school's baseball team from 1922 to 1926. In 1942, Norgren was elected president of the National Association of Basketball Coaches. He retired as Chicago's basketball coach in 1957. In his 34 seasons as the head basketball coach at Chicago, his teams had a winning record in only three seasons: 1924, 1948, and 1949. His teams had back-to-back winless seasons in 1951 (0–18) and 1952 (0–15) and had a combined record of 1–49 from 1951–1953.

Norgren was inducted into the Helms Athletic Foundation Hall of Fame and the University of Chicago Hall of Fame.

== Later years ==
Norgren retired in 1957 and moved to Mill Valley, California. He died there in 1975 at age 83 after a long illness.

== Head coaching record ==
=== Football ===
Year	Team	Overall	Conference	Standing	Bowl/playoffs
Utah Utes (Rocky Mountain Conference) (1914–1917)
1914	Utah	3–3	2–3	5th	
1915	Utah	5–2	4–2	T–2nd	
1916	Utah	3–2	2–2	T–4th	
1917	Utah	2–4	2–3	T–4th	
Utah:		13–11	10–10		
Total:		13–11			

=== Basketball ===
Norgren's record as basketball coach at the University of Chicago was as follows:

- 1921–22 — 15–15
- 1922–23 — 6–9
- 1923–24 — 11–6
- 1924–25 — 3–14
- 1925–26 — 5–11
- 1926–27 — 6–11
- 1927–28 — 8–9
- 1928–29 — 5–11
- 1929–30 — 5–12
- 1930–31 — 8–9
- 1931–32 — 2–15
- 1932–33 — 2–16
- 1933–34 — 5–15
- 1934–35 — 2–18
- 1935–36 — 6–14
- 1936–37 — 4–16
- 1937–38 — 6–12
- 1938–39 — 9–11
- 1939–40 — 5–14
- 1940–41 — 6–14
- 1941–42 — 2–19
- 1944–45 — 7–8
- 1945–46 — 6–14
- 1946–47 — 4–13
- 1947–48 — 2–16
- 1948–49 — 10–8
- 1949–50 — 10–8
- 1950–51 — 0–18
- 1951–52 — 0–15
- 1952–53 — 1–16
- 1953–54 — 6–9
- 1954–55 — 6–13
- 1955–56 — 7–9
- 1956–57 — 6–11
- Overall record at University of Chicago — 186–429 (.302)
