= Bob Evans (coach) =

American sports coach (1889–1964)

Biographical details
- Born: November 16, 1889; Tamaroa, Illinois, U.S.
- Died: August 29, 1964 (aged 74); San Mateo, California, U.S.

Coaching career (HC unless noted)

Football
- 1916–1917: Colorado
- 1919: Stanford

Basketball
- 1917–1918: Colorado
- 1918–1920: Stanford

Baseball
- 1918: Colorado
- 1919–1920: Stanford

Head coaching record
- Overall: 11–10–1 (football); 30–8 (basketball); 18–17 (baseball)

Melbourne Covell "Bob" Evans (November 16, 1889 – August 29, 1964) was an American football, basketball, and baseball coach. He served as the head football coach at the University of Colorado at Boulder in 1916 and 1917 and at Stanford University in 1919, compiling a career college football record of 11–10–1. Evans was also the head basketball coach at Colorado (1917–1918) and Stanford (1918–1920), tallying a career college basketball mark of 30–8, and the head baseball coach at Colorado (1918) and Stanford (1919–1920), amassing a career college baseball record of 18–17. He was also a football official and worked a number of Rose Bowls.

Evans later worked as a grain broker for Evan & Breckenridge in San Francisco. He died on August 29, 1964, at Mills Memorial Hospital in San Mateo, California.

== Head coaching record ==
=== Football ===
Year	Team	Overall	Conference	Standing
Colorado Silver and Gold (Rocky Mountain Conference) (1916–1917)
1916	Colorado	1–5–1	1–5	7th
1917	Colorado	6–2	4–2	3rd
Colorado:		7–7–1	5–7	
Stanford (Pacific Coast Conference) (1919)
1919	Stanford	4–3	1–1	T–3rd
Stanford:		4–3	1–1	
Total:		11–10–1		
