= 1916 Wyoming Cowboys football team =

American college football season

1916 Wyoming Cowboys football
- Conference: Rocky Mountain Conference
- Record: 1–4 (1–4 RMC)
- Head coach: John Corbett (2nd season)
- Captain: L. E. Mau

1916 Rocky Mountain Conference football standings
	Conf.					Overall
Team	W		L		T	W		L		T
Colorado Agricultural $	6	–	0	–	1	6	–	0	–	1
Colorado College	4	–	1	–	0	6	–	1	–	0
Denver	3	–	2	–	0	4	–	2	–	1
Utah	2	–	2	–	0	3	–	2	–	0
Colorado Mines	2	–	2	–	1	3	–	2	–	1
Wyoming	1	–	4	–	0	1	–	4	–	0
Colorado	1	–	5	–	0	1	–	5	–	1
Utah Agricultural	0	–	4	–	0	1	–	5	–	1
$ – Conference champion

The 1916 Wyoming Cowboys football team was an American football team that represented the University of Wyoming as a member of the Rocky Mountain Conference (RMC) during the 1916 college football season. In their second season under head coach John Corbett, the Cowboys compiled a 1–4 record with all games against conference opponents, place sixth in the RMC, and were outscored by a total of 115 to 50. L. E. Mau was the team captain.

== Schedule ==
Date	Opponent	Site	Result	Source
September 30	at Colorado Agricultural	Fort Collins, CO (rivalry)	L 0–40	
October 7	Colorado	Laramie, WY	L 10–16	
October 14	Denver	Laramie, WY	L 10–19	
October 21	at Utah Agricultural	Adams Field; Logan, UT (rivalry)	W 23–10	
October 28	Colorado Mines	Laramie, WY	L 7–30	
