= 1921 New Mexico Lobos football team =

American college football season

1921 New Mexico Lobos football
- Conference: Independent
- Record: 2–2
- Head coach: Roy W. Johnson (2nd season)
- Captain: Frank O. Greenleaf
- Home stadium: University field

1921 Western college football independents records
	Conf.			Overall
Team	W	L	T	W		L		T
USC		–		10	–	1	–	0
Arizona		–		7	–	2	–	0
Santa Clara		–		6	–	0	–	0
La Verne		–		4	–	2	–	1
Chico State		–		4	–	3	–	1
Nevada		–		4	–	3	–	1
Saint Mary's		–		4	–	3	–	0
Hawaii		–		3	–	3	–	2
Pacific (CA)		–		3	–	3	–	0
University Farm		–		3	–	4	–	0
New Mexico		–		2	–	2	–	0
New Mexico A&M		–		2	–	2	–	0
Gonzaga		–		2	–	4	–	1
Fresno State		–		2	–	4	–	0
San Jose State		–		1	–	5	–	0

The 1921 New Mexico Lobos football team represented the University of New Mexico as an independent during the 1921 college football season. In their second season under head coach Roy W. Johnson, the Lobos compiled a 2–2 record.

Tackle Frank O. Greenleaf was the team captain. Other starting players on the team included Ogle Jones (halfback/quarterback), Walter Hernandez (fullback), Thomas Calkins (quarterback/halfback), Vernon Wilfley (halfback), George White (end), Clifford Bernhardt (end), John Richard Popejoy (tackle), Max Ferguson (tackle/guard), Ralph Hernandez (guard), Kenneth Greuter (guard), and Cullen Pearce (center).

== Schedule ==
Date	Opponent	Site	Result	Attendance	Source
October 15	at Colorado College	Washburn Field; Colorado Springs, CO	L 0–7		
November 12	Fort Bliss	University field; Albuquerque, NM	W 35–0	500	
November 19	Arizona	University field; Albuquerque, NM (rivalry)	L 0–24		
November 24	New Mexico A&M	University field; Albuquerque, NM (rivalry)	W 6–0		
