= 1913 New Mexico A&M Aggies football team =

American college football season

1913 New Mexico A&M Aggies football
- Conference: Independent
- Record: 7–0–1
- Head coach: Art Badenoch (4th season)
- Home stadium: Miller Field

1913 Western college football independents records
	Conf.			Overall
Team	W	L	T	W		L		T
New Mexico A&M		–		7	–	0	–	1
Utah Agricultural		–		3	–	3	–	0
New Mexico		–		3	–	2	–	0
Arizona		–		2	–	2	–	0
Montana A&M		–		2	–	2	–	0
Montana		–		2	–	4	–	0
Cheney Normal		–		1	–	5	–	0

The 1913 New Mexico A&M Aggies football team was an American football team that represented New Mexico College of Agriculture and Mechanical Arts (now known as New Mexico State University) during the 1913 college football season. In their fourth and final year under head coach Art Badenoch, the Aggies compiled a 7–0–1 record and outscored all opponents by a total of 122 to 24. The team played home games on Miller Field, sometimes also referred to as College Field.

Seventeen players received the school's football insignia for their roles on the 1913 team: Fred Quesenberry (left end); Joe Quesenberry (left tackle and captain); Mitchell (left guard); Gardner (center); Isaacs (right guard); Powers (right tackle); Hamilton (right end); Lane (L.Q.); Tuttle (R.Q.); Holt (left halfback); Brainard (right halfback); and substitutes Maynard, Rea, Roberts, Frenger, Wooten, and Sessoms.

== Schedule ==
Date	Opponent	Site	Result	Source
September 28	at El Paso High School	Washington Park; El Paso, TX	W 6–2	
October 11	13th Cavalry, Fort Bliss	Miller Field; Las Cruces, NM	W 51–6	
October 18	El Paso High School	Miller Field; Las Cruces, NM	T 0–0	
October 25	at Arizona	Tucson, AZ	W 12–6	
November 1	at El Paso High School	Washington Park; El Paso, TX	W 13–3	
November 8	at Catholic Athletic Association	Washington Park; El Paso, TX	W 13–0	
November 14	New Mexico	Miller Field; Las Cruces, NM (rivalry)	W 12–0	
November 27	at New Mexico Military	Baumer Park; Roswell, NM	W 15–7	
