= 1914 Colorado Silver and Gold football team =

American college football season

1914 Colorado Silver and Gold football
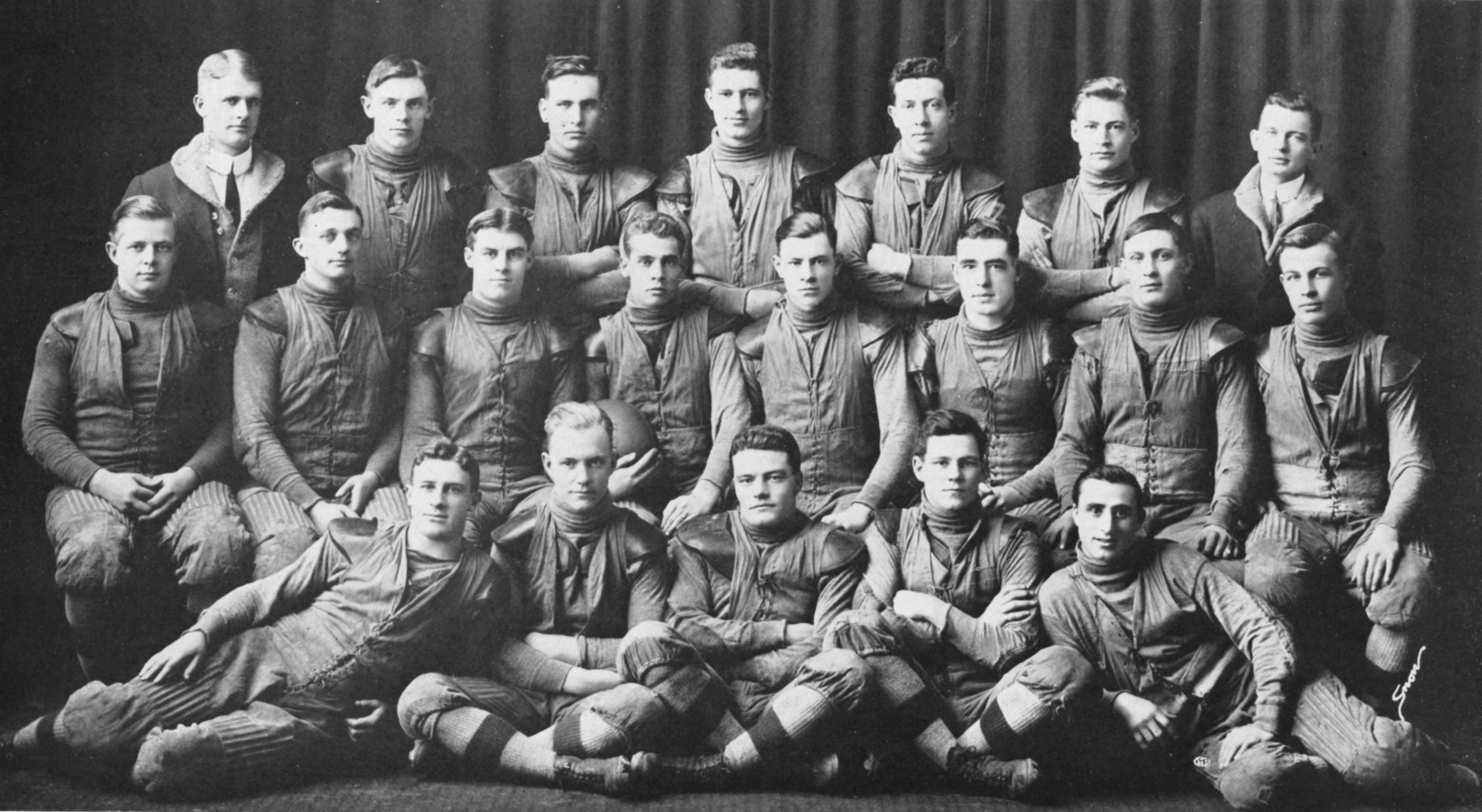
- Conference: Rocky Mountain Conference
- Record: 5–1 (4–1 RMC)
- Head coach: Fred Folsom (14th season)
- Captain: John Donovan
- Home stadium: Gamble Field

1914 Rocky Mountain Conference football standings
	Conf.					Overall
Team	W		L		T	W		L		T
Colorado Mines $	5	–	0	–	1	5	–	0	–	1
Colorado	4	–	1	–	0	5	–	1	–	0
Colorado College	3	–	1	–	1	4	–	1	–	1
Colorado Agricultural	3	–	3	–	0	3	–	4	–	0
Utah	2	–	3	–	0	3	–	3	–	0
Utah Agricultural	1	–	2	–	0	2	–	5	–	0
Denver	1	–	4	–	0	5	–	4	–	0
Wyoming	0	–	5	–	0	1	–	5	–	0
$ – Conference champion

The 1914 Colorado Silver and Gold football team was an American football team that represented the University of Colorado as a member of the Rocky Mountain Conference (RMC) during the 1914 college football season. Led by 14th-year head coach Fred Folsom, Colorado compiled an overall record of 5–1 with a mark of 4–1 in conference play, placing second in the RMC.

== Schedule ==
Date	Opponent	Site	Result
October 10	Colorado alumni*	Gamble Field; Boulder, CO	W 27–3
October 17	at Colorado Agricultural	Colorado Field; Fort Collins, CO (rivalry)	W 33–6
October 31	at Colorado College	Washburn Field; Colorado Springs, CO	W 10–7
November 7	Utah^{†}	Gamble Field; Boulder, CO (rivalry)	W 33–0
November 14	vs. Colorado Mines	Denver, CO	L 2–6
November 26	at Denver	Denver, CO	W 6–0
*Non-conference game; ^{†}Homecoming
