= 1921 Saint Mary's Saints football team =

American college football season

1921 Saint Mary's Saints football
- Conference: Independent
- Record: 4–3
- Head coach: Slip Madigan (1st season)

1921 Western college football independents records
	Conf.			Overall
Team	W	L	T	W		L		T
USC		–		10	–	1	–	0
Arizona		–		7	–	2	–	0
Santa Clara		–		6	–	0	–	0
La Verne		–		4	–	2	–	1
Chico State		–		4	–	3	–	1
Nevada		–		4	–	3	–	1
Saint Mary's		–		4	–	3	–	0
Hawaii		–		3	–	3	–	2
Pacific (CA)		–		3	–	3	–	0
University Farm		–		3	–	4	–	0
New Mexico		–		2	–	2	–	0
New Mexico A&M		–		2	–	2	–	0
Gonzaga		–		2	–	4	–	1
Fresno State		–		2	–	4	–	0
San Jose State		–		1	–	5	–	0

The 1921 Saint Mary's Saints football team was an American football team that represented Saint Mary's College of California during the 1921 college football season. In their first season under head coach Slip Madigan, the Gaels compiled a 4–3 record and outscored their opponents by a combined total of 155 to 70.

Madigan was hired as Saint Mary's head football coach in January 1921. He played center for the Notre Dame football team from 1916 to 1919 and was the football coach at Columbia College in 1920. He remained the coach at St. Mary's for 19 years through the 1939 season.

== Schedule ==
Date	Opponent	Site	Result	Attendance	Source
September 24	at California	California Field; Berkeley, CA	L 0–21	15,000	
October 8	at Stanford	Stanford Field; Stanford, CA	L 7–10	> 5,000	
October 15	at Nevada	Mackay Field; Reno, NV	W 14–6		
October 22	at Mare Island Marines	Beach Park; Vallejo, CA	W 46–6	200	
November 6	at Olympic Club	Ewing Field; San Francisco, CA	W 20–7		
November 11	at Santa Maria American Legion	Santa Maria, CA	W 68–0	> 1,000	
November 20	at Pacific Fleet	Ewing Field; San Francisco, CA	L 0–29	8,000	
