= Ralph Thacker =

American football and basketball coach

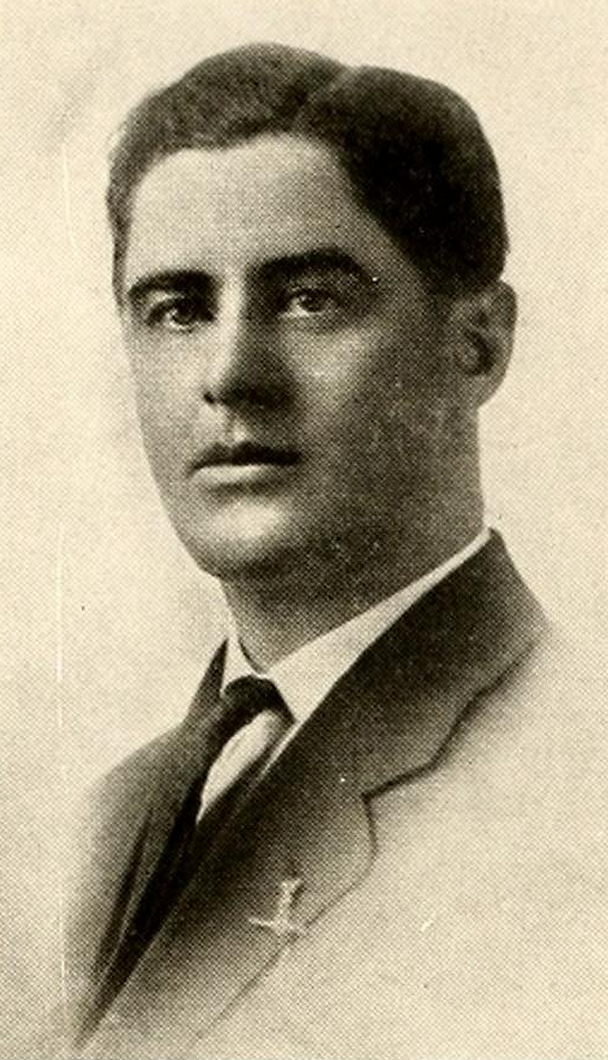
- Thacker pictured in The Forester 1917, Lake Forest yearbook

Biographical details
- Born: September 13, 1880; Michigan, U.S.
- Died: April 12, 1962 (aged 81); Lincoln, Nebraska, U.S.
- Education: Olivet College (B.A., 1909)

Playing career

Football
- 1903–1906: Olivet
- Position: Fullback

Coaching career (HC unless noted)

Football
- 1907: Central Michigan
- c. 1910: Traverse City HS (MI)
- 1911–1912: Peru Normal
- 1913–1914: Wyoming
- 1915: Lake Forest
- 1922–1924: Macalester

Basketball
- 1911–1913: Peru Normal
- 1913–1915: Wyoming
- 1915–1916: Lake Forest
- 1916–1917: Macalester

Administrative career (AD unless noted)
- 1922–1926: Macalester

Head coaching record
- Overall: 17–33–6 (college football)

Ralph William Thacker (September 13, 1880 – April 12, 1962) was an American college football and college basketball coach and athletic administrator. He served as the head football coach at Central Michigan Normal School—now known as Central Michigan University—in 1907, Nebraska State Normal School—now known as Peru State College—from 1911 to 1912, the University of Wyoming from 1913 to 1914, Lake Forest College in 1915, and Macalester College from 1922 to 1924, compiling a career college football head coaching record of 17–33–6. Thacker was also the head basketball coach at Peru Normal from 1911 to 1913, Wyoming from 1913 to 1915, and Lake Forest for the 1915–16 season, and Macalester for the 1916–1917 season. He was the athletic director at Macalester from 1922 to 1926.

Thacker coached at Traverse City High School in Traverse City, Michigan before he was hired in 1911 at Peru Normal as director of physical training and football coach.

Thacker was born in Michigan. He died on April 12, 1962, in Lincoln, Nebraska, where he had resided for 25 years.

== Head coaching record ==
=== College football ===
Year	Team	Overall	Conference	Standing	Bowl/playoffs
Central Michigan Normalites (Independent) (1907)
1907	Central Michigan	2–4			
Central Michigan:		2–4			
Peru Normal (Independent) (1911–1912)
1911	Peru Normal	4–2			
1912	Peru Normal	2–4–2			
Peru Normal:		6–6–2			
Wyoming Cowboys (Rocky Mountain Conference) (1913–1914)
1913	Wyoming	0–5	0–5	7th	
1914	Wyoming	1–5	0–5	8th	
Wyoming:		1–10	0–10		
Lake Forest Foresters (Little Five Conference) (1915)
1915	Lake Forest	2–4			
Lake Forest:		2–4			
Macalester Macs (Minnesota Intercollegiate Athletic Conference) (1922–1924)
1922	Macalester	2–3–1	2–3–1	5th	
1923	Macalester	3–3–1	2–3	5th	
1924	Macalester	1–3–2	1–2–2	T–5th	
Macalester:		6–9–4	5–8–3		
Total:		17–33–6			
