= 1915 Colorado Silver and Gold football team =

American college football season

1915 Colorado Silver and Gold football
- Conference: Rocky Mountain Conference
- Record: 1–6 (1–5 RMC)
- Head coach: Fred Folsom (15th season)
- Captain: Ray Nelson
- Home stadium: Gamble Field

1915 Rocky Mountain Conference football standings
	Conf.					Overall
Team	W		L		T	W		L		T
Colorado Agricultural $	7	–	0	–	0	7	–	0	–	0
Utah	4	–	2	–	0	5	–	2	–	0
Colorado Mines	4	–	2	–	0	4	–	2	–	0
Colorado College	3	–	2	–	0	6	–	2	–	0
Denver	2	–	3	–	0	4	–	3	–	0
Wyoming	1	–	5	–	0	2	–	6	–	0
Colorado	1	–	5	–	0	1	–	6	–	0
Utah Agricultural	0	–	3	–	0	3	–	4	–	0
$ – Conference champion

The 1915 Colorado Silver and Gold football team was an American football team that represented the University of Colorado as a member of the Rocky Mountain Conference (RMC) during the 1915 college football season. Led by Fred Folsom in his 15 and final season as head coach, Colorado compiled an overall record of 1–6 with a mark of 1–5 in conference play, tying for sixth place in the RMC. It was least successful of his Folsom's 15 seasons as Colorado. Colorado Stadium was renamed Folsom Field in 1944 following his death.

== Schedule ==
Date	Opponent	Site	Result	Attendance	Source
October 2	Wyoming	Gamble Field; Boulder, CO	W 30–0		
October 9	Colorado Agricultural	Gamble Field; Boulder, CO (rivalry)	L 6–23		
October 23	Colorado College^{†}	Gamble Field; Boulder, CO	L 0–44		
October 30	at Utah	Cummings Field; Salt Lake City, UT (rivalry)	L 3–35		
November 6	vs. Colorado Mines	Denver, CO	L 6–13		
November 20	at Denver	Denver, CO	L 0–7		
November 25	at Washington*	Denny Field; Seattle, WA	L 0–46	6,000	
*Non-conference game; ^{†}Homecoming
