= 1913 Montana Grizzlies football team =

American college football season

1913 Montana Grizzlies football
- Conference: Independent
- Record: 2–4
- Head coach: A. George Heilman (1st season)
- Home stadium: Dornblaser Field

1913 Western college football independents records
	Conf.			Overall
Team	W	L	T	W		L		T
New Mexico A&M		–		7	–	0	–	1
Utah Agricultural		–		3	–	3	–	0
New Mexico		–		3	–	2	–	0
Arizona		–		2	–	2	–	0
Montana A&M		–		2	–	2	–	0
Montana		–		2	–	4	–	0
Cheney Normal		–		1	–	5	–	0

The 1913 Montana Grizzlies football team represented the University of Montana in the 1913 college football season. They were led by first-year head coach A. George Heilman, played their home games at Dornblaser Field and finished the season with a record of two wins and four losses (2–4). Montana did not play Idaho this season.

== Schedule ==
Date	Opponent	Site	Result	Source
October 11	at Washington State	Rogers Field; Pullman, WA	L 9–34	
October 25	Utah Agricultural	Dornblaser Field; Missoula, MT	L 7–9	
November 1	at Montana A&M	Bozeman, MT (rivalry)	W 7–0	
November 14	Montana A&M	Dornblaser Field; Missoula, MT	W 20–0	
November 22	at Gonzaga	Spokane, WA	L 7–16	
November 27	at Whitman	Ankeny Field; Walla Walla, WA	L 0–35	
