= Denver Ministers football, 1910–1919 =

American college football season

1910–1919 Denver Ministers football
- Conference: Rocky Mountain Conference
- Head coach: John P. Koehler (1906–1910), Thomas A. Barry (1911), Clem Crowley (1912), Charles Wingender (1913), Harry G. Buckingham (1914), John Fike (1915–1918), George Koonsman (1919)

The Denver Ministers football program, 1910–1919 represented the University of Denver in college football during the 1910s as a member of the Rocky Mountain Conference. The program was led by seven head coaches during the decade, only one of which (John Fike) coached for more than one season in the 1910s. Fiske led the program from 1915 to 1918, compiling a winning record in each of his four years as head coach.

Highlights of the decade included:

- The 1911 team compiled a 5–2–1 in the program's first and only season under head coach Thomas A. Barry.
- The 1914 team compiled a 5–4 record in the program's first and only season under head coach Harry G. Buckingham.
- The 1915 team compiled a 4–3 record in the program's first season under head coach John Fike.
- The 1916 team compiled a 4–2–1 record in the program's second season under Fike.
- In their third season under Fike, the 1917 Ministers compiled a perfect 9–0 record and tied with Utah Agricultural for the RMC championship. It was the only perfect season in University of Denver football history.

== 1910 ==
1910 Denver Ministers football
- Conference: Rocky Mountain Conference
- Record: 4–3–1 (2–2 RMC)
- Head coach: John P. Koehler (5th season)

1910 Rocky Mountain Conference football standings
	Conf.					Overall
Team	W		L		T	W		L		T
Colorado College +	4	–	0	–	0	7	–	0	–	0
Colorado +	3	–	0	–	0	6	–	0	–	0
Utah	2	–	2	–	0	4	–	2	–	0
Denver	2	–	2	–	0	4	–	3	–	1
Colorado Mines	1	–	4	–	0	2	–	4	–	0
Colorado Agricultural	0	–	4	–	0	0	–	5	–	0
+ – Conference co-champions

The 1910 Denver Ministers football team represented the University of Denver as a member of the Rocky Mountain Conference (RMC) during the 1910 college football season. In their fifth and final season under head coach John P. Koehler, the Ministers compiled a 4–3–1 record (2–2 against conference opponents), tied for third place in the RMC, and outscored opponents by a total of 72 to 65.

=== Schedule ===
Date	Opponent	Site	Result	Source
October 1	Denver alumni*	Denver, CO	W 11–3	
October 8	Wyoming*	Denver, CO	W 17–3	
October 15	Marquette*	Denver, CO	T 0–0	
October 22	at Nebraska*	Nebraska Field; Lincoln, NE	L 0–27	
October 29	at Colorado Agricultural	Durkee Field; Fort Collins, CO	W 22–0	
November 5	Colorado Mines	Denver, CO	W 17–6	
November 12	at Utah	Cummings Field; Salt Lake City, UT	L 0–20	
November 24	Colorado College	Denver, CO	L 5–6	
*Non-conference game

== 1911 ==
1911 Denver Ministers football
- Conference: Rocky Mountain Conference
- Record: 5–2–1 (3–1–1 RMC)
- Head coach: Thomas A. Barry (1st season)

1911 Rocky Mountain Conference football standings
	Conf.					Overall
Team	W		L		T	W		L		T
Colorado $	5	–	0	–	0	6	–	0	–	0
Utah	3	–	1	–	1	5	–	1	–	1
Denver	3	–	1	–	1	5	–	2	–	1
Colorado College	3	–	2	–	0	4	–	3	–	0
Wyoming	2	–	3	–	0	4	–	3	–	1
Colorado Mines	1	–	5	–	0	2	–	5	–	0
Colorado Agricultural	0	–	5	–	0	0	–	6	–	0
$ – Conference champion

The 1911 Denver Ministers football team represented the University of Denver as a member of the Rocky Mountain Conference (RMC) during the 1911 college football season. In their first and only season under head coach Thomas A. Barry, the Ministers compiled a 5–2–1 record (3–1–1 against conference opponents), tied for second place in the RMC, shut out six of eight opponents, and outscored all opponents by a total of 81 to 22.

=== Schedule ===
Date	Opponent	Site	Result	Attendance	Source
October 7	Denver alumni*	Denver, CO	W 12–0		
October 14	Utah	Denver, CO	T 0–0	3,000	
October 21	Baker*	Denver, CO	W 5–0		
October 28	South Dakota*	Denver, CO	L 0–10		
November 4	Colorado Agricultural	Denver, CO	W 49–0		
November 11	at Colorado Mines	Golden, CO	W 9–0		
November 18	at Wyoming	Laramie, WY	W 6–0		
November 30	Colorado College	Denver, CO	L 0–12		
*Non-conference game

== 1912 ==
1912 Denver Ministers football
- Conference: Rocky Mountain Conference
- Record: 2–6–1 (1–3 RMC)
- Head coach: Clem Crowley (1st season)

1912 Rocky Mountain Conference football standings
	Conf.					Overall
Team	W		L		T	W		L		T
Colorado Mines +	5	–	1	–	0	9	–	1	–	0
Utah +	4	–	1	–	0	5	–	1	–	1
Colorado Agricultural	3	–	2	–	0	3	–	2	–	0
Colorado	2	–	2	–	0	6	–	3	–	0
Colorado College	2	–	4	–	0	5	–	4	–	0
Denver	1	–	3	–	0	2	–	6	–	1
Wyoming	0	–	5	–	0	2	–	7	–	0
+ – Conference co-champions

The 1912 Denver Ministers football team represented the University of Denver as a member of the Rocky Mountain Conference (RMC) during the 1912 college football season. In their first and only season under head coach Clem Crowley, the Ministers compiled a 2–6–1 record (1–3 against conference opponents), finished sixth in the RMC, and were outscored by a total of 130 to 87.

=== Schedule ===
Date	Opponent	Site	Result	Source
September 21	Denver alumni*	Denver, CO	T 0–0	
September 28	at Washburn*	Topeka, KS	L 0–12	
October 5	at Colorado Agricultural	Colorado Field; Fort Collins, CO	L 13–14	
October 19	at Utah	Cummings Field; Salt Lake City, UT	L 0–66	
October 26	at Occidental*	Los Angeles, CA	L 0–13	
November 2	Haskell	Denver, CO	L 10–12	
November 9	Baker*	Denver, CO	W 44–0	
November 16	Colorado Mines	Denver, CO	L 0–10	
November 28	at Colorado College	Washburn Field; Colorado Springs, CO	W 20–3	
*Non-conference game

== 1913 ==
1913 Denver Ministers football
- Conference: Rocky Mountain Conference
- Record: 2–5 (1–3 RMC)
- Head coach: Charles Wingender (1st season)

1913 Rocky Mountain Conference football standings
	Conf.					Overall
Team	W		L		T	W		L		T
Colorado $	4	–	0	–	1	5	–	1	–	1
Colorado Mines	5	–	1	–	0	5	–	1	–	0
Colorado College	2	–	2	–	1	5	–	2	–	1
Colorado Agricultural $	2	–	2	–	0	3	–	2	–	0
Utah	1	–	2	–	0	2	–	4	–	1
Denver	1	–	3	–	0	2	–	5	–	0
Wyoming	0	–	5	–	0	0	–	5	–	0
$ – Conference champion

The 1913 Denver Ministers football team represented the University of Denver as a member of the Rocky Mountain Conference (RMC) during the 1913 college football season. In their first and only season under head coach Charles Wingender, the Ministers compiled a 2–5 record (1–3 against conference opponents), finished sixth in the RMC, and were outscored by a total of 140 to 47.

=== Schedule ===
Date	Opponent	Site	Result	Source
October 11	Denver alumni*	Denver, CO	W 6–0	
October 18	Colorado Agricultural	Denver, CO	L 6–20	
October 25	South Dakota*	Denver, CO	L 0–43	
November 1	Kearney Normal*	Denver, CO	L 0–7	
November 8	at Wyoming	Laramie, WY	W 26–0	
November 15	Colorado College	Denver, CO	L 2–21	
November 27	at Colorado Mines	Golden, CO	L 7–49	
*Non-conference game

== 1914 ==
1914 Denver Ministers football
- Conference: Rocky Mountain Conference
- Record: 5–4 (1–4 RMC)
- Head coach: Harry G. Buckingham (1st season)

1914 Rocky Mountain Conference football standings
	Conf.					Overall
Team	W		L		T	W		L		T
Colorado Mines $	5	–	0	–	1	5	–	0	–	1
Colorado	4	–	1	–	0	5	–	1	–	0
Colorado College	3	–	1	–	1	4	–	1	–	1
Colorado Agricultural	3	–	3	–	0	3	–	4	–	0
Utah	2	–	3	–	0	3	–	3	–	0
Utah Agricultural	1	–	2	–	0	2	–	5	–	0
Denver	1	–	4	–	0	5	–	4	–	0
Wyoming	0	–	5	–	0	1	–	5	–	0
$ – Conference champion

The 1914 Denver Ministers football team represented the University of Denver as a member of the Rocky Mountain Conference (RMC) during the 1914 college football season. In their first and only season under head coach Harry G. Buckingham, the Ministers compiled a 5–4 record (1–4 against conference opponents), finished seventh in the RMC, and outscored opponents by a total of 186 to 114.

=== Schedule ===
Date	Opponent	Site	Result	Source
?	South High School*	Denver, CO	W 33–7	
October 3	Sacred Heart*	Denver, CO	W 20–0	
October 10	Denver alumni*	Denver, CO	W 7–3	
October 17	Kearney Normal*	Denver, CO	W 82–0	
October 31	Colorado Agricultural	Denver, CO	L 6–19	
November 7	Colorado Mines	Denver, CO	L 0–18	
November 14	at Colorado College	Denver, CO	L 7–61	
November 21	at Wyoming	Laramie, WY	W 31–0	
November 26	Colorado	Denver, CO	L 0–6	
*Non-conference game

== 1915 ==
1915 Denver Ministers football
- Conference: Rocky Mountain Conference
- Record: 4–3 (2–3 RMC)
- Head coach: John Fike (1st season)

1915 Rocky Mountain Conference football standings
	Conf.					Overall
Team	W		L		T	W		L		T
Colorado Agricultural $	7	–	0	–	0	7	–	0	–	0
Utah	4	–	2	–	0	5	–	2	–	0
Colorado Mines	4	–	2	–	0	4	–	2	–	0
Colorado College	3	–	2	–	0	6	–	2	–	0
Denver	2	–	3	–	0	4	–	3	–	0
Wyoming	1	–	5	–	0	2	–	6	–	0
Colorado	1	–	5	–	0	1	–	6	–	0
Utah Agricultural	0	–	3	–	0	3	–	4	–	0
$ – Conference champion

The 1915 Denver Ministers football team represented the University of Denver as a member of the Rocky Mountain Conference (RMC) during the 1915 college football season. In their first season under head coach John Fike, the team compiled a 4–3 record (2–3 against conference opponents), finished fifth in the RMC, and outscored opponents by a total of 103 to 83.

=== Schedule ===
Date	Opponent	Site	Result	Source
October 9	South High School*	Denver, CO	W 47–0	
October 16	Montana A&M*	Denver, CO	W 27–3	
October 23	at Wyoming	Laramie, WY	W 19–7	
October 30	Colorado College	Denver, CO	L 0–21	
November 6	at Colorado Mines	Golden, CO	L 0–18	
November 20	Colorado	Denver, CO	W 7–0	
November 25	at Colorado Agricultural	Colorado Field; Fort Collins, CO	L 3–34	
*Non-conference game

== 1916 ==
1916 Denver Ministers football
- Conference: Rocky Mountain Conference
- Record: 4–2–1 (3–2 RMC)
- Head coach: John Fike (2nd season)

1916 Rocky Mountain Conference football standings
	Conf.					Overall
Team	W		L		T	W		L		T
Colorado Agricultural $	6	–	0	–	1	6	–	0	–	1
Colorado College	4	–	1	–	0	6	–	1	–	0
Denver	3	–	2	–	0	4	–	2	–	1
Utah	2	–	2	–	0	3	–	2	–	0
Colorado Mines	2	–	2	–	1	3	–	2	–	1
Wyoming	1	–	4	–	0	1	–	4	–	0
Colorado	1	–	5	–	0	1	–	5	–	1
Utah Agricultural	0	–	4	–	0	1	–	5	–	1
$ – Conference champion

The 1916 Denver Ministers football team represented the University of Denver as a member of the Rocky Mountain Conference (RMC) during the 1916 college football season. In their second season under head coach John Fike, the Ministers compiled a 4–2–1 record (3–2 against conference opponents), finished third in the RMC, and outscored opponents by a total of 92 to 79.

=== Schedule ===
Date	Opponent	Site	Result	Source
September 30	Denver freshmen*	Denver, CO	T 0–0	
October 14	at Wyoming	Laramie, WY	W 19–10	
October 21	at Colorado	Gamble Field; Boulder, CO	W 7–0	
October 28	Creighton*	Creighton Field; Omaha, NE	W 19–13	
November 4	Colorado Agricultural	Denver, CO	L 13–21	
November 18	at Colorado College	Colorado Springs, CO	L 13–35	
November 30	Colorado Mines	Denver, CO	W 21–0	
*Non-conference game

== 1917 ==
1917 Denver Ministers football

RMC champion
- Conference: Rocky Mountain Conference
- Record: 9–0 (6–0 RMC)
- Head coach: John Fike (3rd season)
- Home stadium: Union Park

1917 Rocky Mountain Conference football standings
	Conf.					Overall
Team	W		L		T	W		L		T
Denver $	6	–	0	–	0	9	–	0	–	0
Utah Agricultural	4	–	0	–	1	7	–	0	–	1
Colorado	4	–	2	–	0	6	–	2	–	0
Colorado Mines	2	–	3	–	0	5	–	3	–	0
Colorado College	2	–	3	–	0	3	–	3	–	0
Utah	2	–	3	–	0	2	–	4	–	0
Wyoming	1	–	4	–	0	3	–	4	–	0
Montana State	0	–	1	–	2	0	–	2	–	2
Colorado Agricultural	0	–	7	–	1	1	–	7	–	1
$ – Conference champion

The 1917 Denver Ministers football team represented the University of Denver as a member of the Rocky Mountain Conference (RMC) during the 1917 college football season. In their third season under head coach John Fike, the Ministers compiled a perfect 9–0 record (6–0 against conference opponents), won the RMC championship, and outscored opponents by a total of 226 to 45.

At the end of the season, both Denver and Utah Agricultural were undefeated against RMC opponents. A game between the two teams was proposed to determine an undisputed conference champion, but Denver's faculty ruled against the game. Denver officials claimed the title and asserted that the Utah Aggies "have a right to claim nothing more than a tie for the honors."

The 1917 team compiled the only perfect season in the program's history.

=== Schedule ===
Date	Opponent	Site	Result	Source
October 6	Camp Logan*	Denver, CO	W 45–0	
October 13	Montana State	Denver, CO	W 33–7	
October 20	Colorado	Denver, CO	W 7–0	
October 27	at Colorado Agricultural	Fort Collins, CO	W 10–6	
November 3	at Wyoming	Laramie, WY	W 18–0	
November 10	at Kendall*	Association Park; Tulsa, OK	W 20–19	
November 17	Colorado Mines	Union Park; Denver, CO	W 51–0	
November 24	at Colorado Teachers*	Greeley, CO	W 14–6	
November 29	Colorado College	Denver, CO	W 28–7	
*Non-conference game

== 1918 ==
1918 Denver Ministers football
- Conference: Rocky Mountain Conference
- Record: 3–2 (3–1 RMC)
- Head coach: John Fike (4th season)

1918 Rocky Mountain Conference football standings
	Conf.					Overall
Team	W		L		T	W		L		T
Colorado Mines $	2	–	0	–	0	4	–	0	–	0
Denver	3	–	1	–	0	3	–	2	–	0
Colorado	1	–	2	–	0	2	–	3	–	0
Colorado College	1	–	2	–	0	1	–	2	–	0
Colorado Agricultural	0	–	2	–	0	0	–	2	–	0
$ – Conference champion

The 1918 Denver Ministers football team represented the University of Denver as a member of the Rocky Mountain Conference (RMC) during the 1918 college football season. In their fourth and final season under head coach John Fike, the Ministers compiled a 3–2 record (3–1 against conference opponents), finished in second place in the RMC, and were outscored by a total of 74 to 49.

=== Schedule ===
Date	Opponent	Site	Result	Source
November 9	at Colorado Mines	Golden, CO	L 6–48	
November 16	Colorado Agricultural	Denver, CO	W 14–0	
November 23	Colorado	Denver, CO	W 6–0	
November 28	Colorado College	Denver, CO	W 16–0	
December 7	Colorado Teachers*	Denver, CO	L 7–2	
*Non-conference game

== 1919 ==
1919 Denver Ministers football
- Conference: Rocky Mountain Conference
- Record: 1–5–1 (0–4–1 RMC)
- Head coach: George Koonsman (1st season)

1919 Rocky Mountain Conference football standings
	Conf.					Overall
Team	W		L		T	W		L		T
Colorado Agricultural $	7	–	1	–	0	7	–	1	–	0
Utah	4	–	1	–	0	5	–	2	–	0
Colorado College	3	–	1	–	1	4	–	2	–	1
Utah Agricultural	3	–	2	–	0	5	–	2	–	0
Wyoming †	3	–	3	–	0	3	–	5	–	0
Colorado	2	–	3	–	1	2	–	3	–	1
Denver	0	–	4	–	1	1	–	5	–	1
Colorado Mines	0	–	4	–	1	0	–	4	–	3
Montana State †	0	–	3	–	0	1	–	3	–	1
$ – Conference champion; † Ineligible for conference title

The 1919 Denver Ministers football team represented the University of Denver as a member of the Rocky Mountain Conference (RMC) during the 1919 college football season. In their first and only season under head coach George Koonsman, the Ministers compiled a 1–5–1 record (0–4–1 against conference opponents), tied for seventh place in the RMC, and were outscored by a total of 191 to 23.

=== Schedule ===
Date	Time	Opponent	Site	Result	Source
October 18		Colorado	Denver, CO	L 7–26	
October 25		Wyoming	Denver, CO	L 6–36	
November 1		Colorado Agricultural	Denver, CO	L 3–33	
November 8		Colorado Mines	Denver, CO	T 0–0	
November 15		at Colorado College	Colorado Springs, CO	L 0–38	
November 22	1:30 p.m.	at Phillips*	High school grounds; Enid, OK	L 0–58	
November 27		US Recup. Company*	Denver, CO	W 7–0	
*Non-conference game; All times are in Mountain time
