= 1921 Gonzaga Bulldogs football team =

American college football season

1921 Gonzaga Bulldogs football
- Conference: Independent
- Record: 2–4–1
- Head coach: Gus Dorais (2nd season)
- Home stadium: Spokane fairgrounds

1921 Western college football independents records
	Conf.			Overall
Team	W	L	T	W		L		T
USC		–		10	–	1	–	0
Arizona		–		7	–	2	–	0
Santa Clara		–		6	–	0	–	0
La Verne		–		4	–	2	–	1
Chico State		–		4	–	3	–	1
Nevada		–		4	–	3	–	1
Saint Mary's		–		4	–	3	–	0
Hawaii		–		3	–	3	–	2
Pacific (CA)		–		3	–	3	–	0
University Farm		–		3	–	4	–	0
New Mexico		–		2	–	2	–	0
New Mexico A&M		–		2	–	2	–	0
Gonzaga		–		2	–	4	–	1
Fresno State		–		2	–	4	–	0
San Jose State		–		1	–	5	–	0

The 1921 Gonzaga Bulldogs football team was an American football team that represented Gonzaga University during the 1921 college football season. In their second year under head coach Gus Dorais, the Bulldogs compiled a 2–4–1 record and were outscored by a total of 93 to 64.

== Schedule ==
Date	Opponent	Site	Result	Attendance	Source
October 7	at College of Idaho	Caldwell, ID	W 36–0		
October 15	Washington State	Spokane fairgrounds; Spokane, WA	L 7–54	4,000	
October 22	at Fort Lewis	Tacoma, WA	L 7–10		
October 29	Montana State	Spokane, WA	W 7–2	3,000	
November 6	at Multnomah Athletic Club	Multnomah Field; Portland, OR	L 6–21		
November 19	Idaho	Spokane fairgrounds; Spokane, WA	L 0–6	1,500	
November 24	Montana	Spokane, WA	T 0–0		
