= 1914 Colorado Agricultural Aggies football team =

American college football season

1914 Colorado Agricultural Aggies football
- Conference: Rocky Mountain Conference
- Record: 3–4 (3–3 RMC)
- Head coach: Harry W. Hughes (4th season)
- Home stadium: Colorado Field

1914 Rocky Mountain Conference football standings
	Conf.					Overall
Team	W		L		T	W		L		T
Colorado Mines $	5	–	0	–	1	5	–	0	–	1
Colorado	4	–	1	–	0	5	–	1	–	0
Colorado College	3	–	1	–	1	4	–	1	–	1
Colorado Agricultural	3	–	3	–	0	3	–	4	–	0
Utah	2	–	3	–	0	3	–	3	–	0
Utah Agricultural	1	–	2	–	0	2	–	5	–	0
Denver	1	–	4	–	0	5	–	4	–	0
Wyoming	0	–	5	–	0	1	–	5	–	0
$ – Conference champion

The 1914 Colorado Agricultural Aggies football team represented Colorado Agricultural College (now known as Colorado State University) in the Rocky Mountain Conference (RMC) during the 1914 college football season. In their fourth season under head coach Harry W. Hughes, the Aggies compiled a 3–4 record and outscored all opponents by a total of 127 to 106.

== Schedule ==
Date	Time	Opponent	Site	Result	Source
October 17		Colorado	Colorado Field; Fort Collins, CO (rivalry)	L 6–33	
October 24		at Wyoming	Laramie, WY (rivalry)	W 48–10	
October 31		at Denver	Denver, CO	W 19–6	
November 7		Colorado College	Colorado Field; Fort Collins, CO	L 13–24	
November 14		at Utah Agricultural	Adams Field; Logan, UT	W 41–7	
November 21		at Colorado Mines	Golden, CO	L 0–19	
November 26	2:30 p.m.	at Oklahoma A&M*	Fair Park; Oklahoma City, OK	L 0–7	
*Non-conference game; All times are in Mountain time
