= Charles Wingender =

American sports coach and lawyer (1884–1943)

Biographical details
- Born: September 20, 1884; Mineral Point, Wisconsin, U.S.
- Died: April 19, 1943 (aged 58); Hudson, Wisconsin, U.S.

Playing career

Football
- 1902–1905: Lawrence

Coaching career (HC unless noted)

Football
- 1913: Denver

Basketball
- 1910–1911: Denver
- 1914–1916: Denver
- 1918–1919: Denver

Head coaching record
- Overall: 2–5 (football); 24–13 (basketball)

Accomplishments and honors

Championships
- Baseball; RMC regular season (1915)

Charles Henry Wingender (September 20, 1884 – April 19, 1943) was an American football and basketball coach and a lawyer. He was the head football coach at the University of Denver in 1913, tallying a mark of 2–5. Wingender was served three stints as Denver's head basketball coach, in 1910–11, from 1914 to 1916, and in 1918–19, compiling a record of 24–13. He was a graduate of Lawrence University in Appleton, Wisconsin.

== Head coaching record ==
=== Football ===
Year	Team	Overall	Conference	Standing
Denver Ministers (Rocky Mountain Conference) (1913)
1913	Denver	2–5	1–3	6th
Denver:		2–5	1–3	
Total:		2–5		
