= Jeff Wulbrun =

American basketball coach (born 1960)

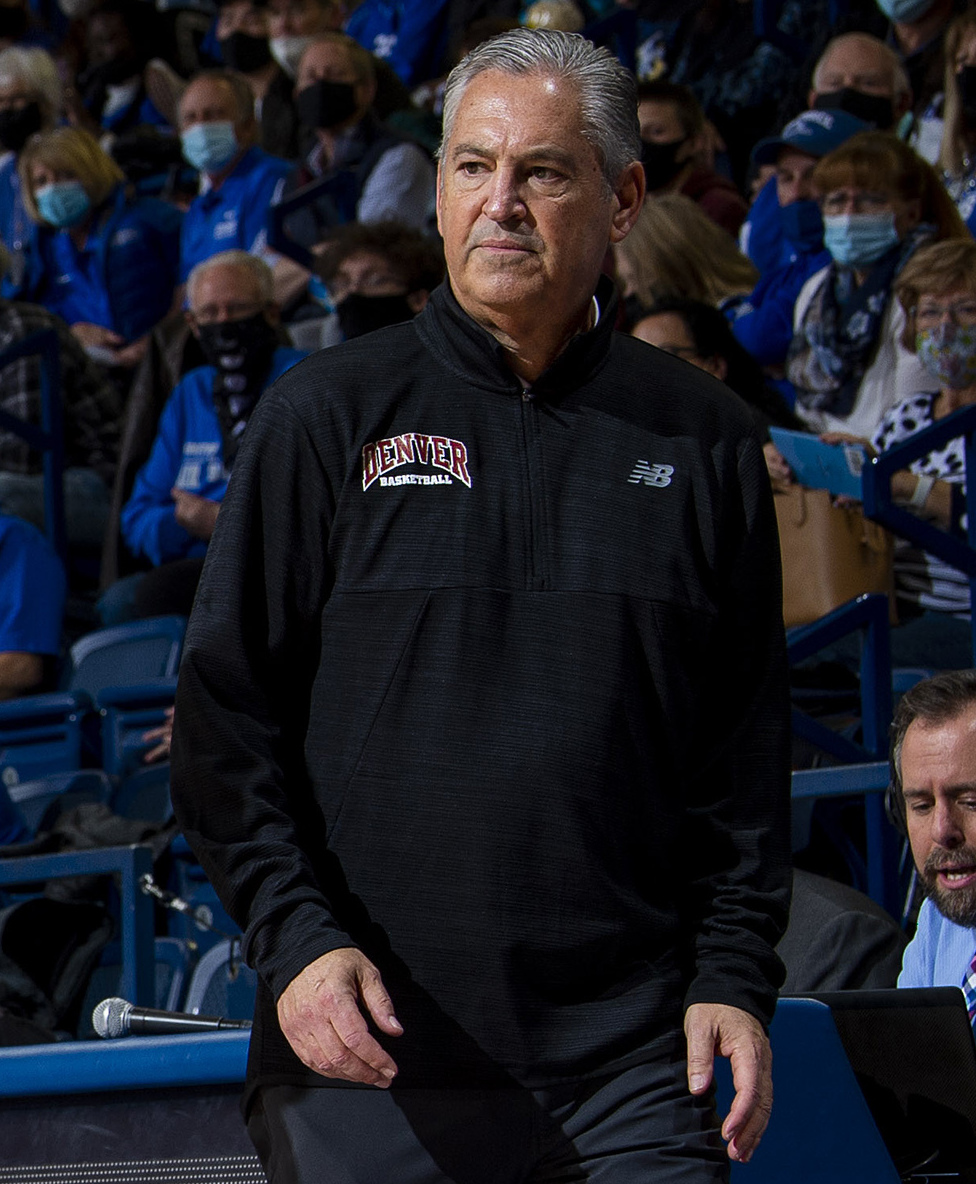
- Wulbrun during a game with Denver in 2021

Current position
- Title: Head coach
- Team: Sacred Heart Prep (CA)

Biographical details
- Born: August 5, 1960 (age 66); Cypress, California, U.S.
- Education: Cal State Fullerton ('84)

Coaching career (HC unless noted)
- 1986–1993: California (assistant)
- 1993–1997: Illinois State (assistant)
- 2002–2007: Central Catholic HS
- 2012–2016: UAB (assistant)
- 2016–2021: Stanford (assistant)
- 2021–2025: Denver
- 2025–present: Sacred Heart Prep

Administrative career (AD unless noted)
- 2011–2012: Virginia Tech (DBO)

Head coaching record
- Overall: 54–76 (.415) (college); 94–46 (.671) (high school)

Jeff Wulbrun (born August 5, 1960) is an American basketball coach who is currently the head boys' high school basketball coach at Sacred Heart Prep in Atherton, California.

== Coaching career ==
=== Early career ===
Wulbrun's first coaching experience came under Lou Campanelli as an assistant coach at Cal, where he stayed on staff until Campanelli's retirement before joining Kevin Stallings as an assistant at Illinois State.

=== Central Catholic HS ===
In 1997, Wulbrun would leave college coaching to work in the private sector while also coaching high school basketball at Central Catholic High School in Bloomington, Illinois from 2002 to 2007.

=== NCAA assistant ===
In 2011, Wulbrun would accept a spot as director of basketball operations for Seth Greenberg at Virginia Tech for a season before joining Jerod Haase as an assistant coach at UAB. While on staff at UAB, Wulbrun was part of the Blazers' 2015 Conference USA tournament title and 2015 NCAA tournament squad, along with a UAB regular season and 2016 NIT team. in 2016, Wulbrun would follow Hasse as an assistant coach at Stanford.

=== Denver ===
On March 29, 2021, Wulbrun was named the 33rd head coach in University of Denver history, replacing Rodney Billups.

=== Sacred Heart Prep ===
In October 2025 Wulbrun was named the head boys' varsity basketball coach and program director at Sacred Heart Schools, Atherton.

== Head coaching record ==
Record table
Season	Team	Overall	Conference	Standing	Postseason
Denver Pioneers (Summit League) (2021–2025)
2021–22	Denver	11–21	7–11	T–6th	
2022–23	Denver	15–17	6–12	T–8th	
2023–24	Denver	17–17	6–10	7th	
2024–25	Denver	11–21	5–11	T–6th	
Denver:		54–76 (.415)	24–44 (.353)		
Total:		54–76 (.415)			
National champion Postseason invitational champion Conference regular season champion Conference regular season and conference tournament champion Division regular season champion Division regular season and conference tournament champion Conference tournament champion
