= John P. Koehler =

American football and basketball coach (1880–1961)

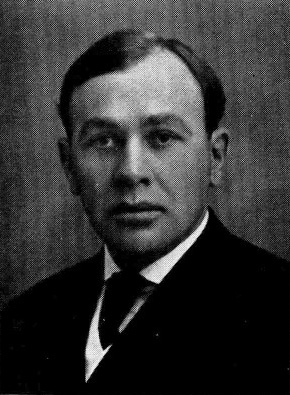
- Koehler pictured in The Hilltop 1915, Marquette yearbook

Biographical details
- Born: February 24, 1880; Norka (Krasnoarmeysky District), Saratov Oblast, Russia
- Died: August 3, 1961 (aged 81); West Bend, Wisconsin, U.S.

Playing career

Football
- 1899–1901: Nebraska
- Position: Center

Coaching career (HC unless noted)

Football
- 1903: Chicago (assistant)
- 1904–1905: Lawrence
- 1906–1910: Denver
- 1914–1915: Marquette

Basketball
- 1905–1906: Lawrence
- 1906–1909: Denver

Head coaching record
- Overall: 39–29–4 (football); 15–22 (basketball)

Accomplishments and honors

Championships
- Football; 1 CFA (1908)

John Peter "Deacon" Koehler (February 24, 1880 – August 3, 1961) was an American college football and college basketball coach. He served as the head football coach at Lawrence Institute in Appleton, Wisconsin—now known as Lawrence University—from 1904 to 1905, at the University of Denver from 1906 to 1910, and at Marquette University from 1914 to 1915, compiling a career college football head coaching record of 39–29–4. Koehler was also the head basketball coach at Lawrence from 1905 to 1906 and at Denver from 1906 to 1909, tallying a career college basketball head coaching record mark of 15–22.

Koehler was the health commissioner of Milwaukee from 1925 until his retirement in 1940. He died on August 3, 1961, at his home in West Bend, Wisconsin, after a heart attack.

== Head coaching record ==
=== Football ===
Year	Team	Overall	Conference	Standing
Lawrence Vikings (Independent) (1904–1905)
1904	Lawrence	4–2–1		
1905	Lawrence	7–3		
Lawrence:		11–5–1		
Denver Ministers (Colorado Football Association) (1906–1908)
1906	Denver	2–3	2–2	T–2nd
1907	Denver	2–6	1–3	4th
1908	Denver	7–1	4–0	T–1st
Denver Pioneers (Independent) (1909)
1909	Denver	7–2		
Denver Pioneers (Rocky Mountain Conference) (1910)
1910	Denver	4–3–1	2–2	T–3rd
Denver:		22–15–1	9–7	
Marquette Blue and Gold (Independent) (1914–1915)
1914	Marquette	2–7		
1915	Marquette	4–2–2		
Marquette:		6–9–2		
Total:		39–29–4		
National championship Conference title Conference division title or championship game berth
