= John Fike =

American football and basketball coach (1887–1961)

Biographical details
- Born: June 11, 1887; Nebraska, U.S.
- Died: January 10, 1961 (aged 73); Denver, Colorado, U.S.

Playing career

Football
- c. 1910: Denver

Baseball
- c. 1910: Denver

Coaching career (HC unless noted)

Football
- 1914: South HS (CO)
- 1915–1918: Denver

Basketball
- 1916–1918: Denver

Head coaching record
- Overall: 20–7–1 (college football); 7–8 (college basketball)

Accomplishments and honors

Championships
- Football; 1 RMC (1917)

John William Fike (June 11, 1887 – January 10, 1961) was an American football and basketball coach. He served as the head football coach at the University of Denver from 1915 to 1918, compiling a record of 20–7–1. Fike was also the head basketball coach at Denver from 1916 to 1918, tallying a mark of 7–8. Fike died on January 10, 1961.

== Head coaching record ==
=== College football ===
Year	Team	Overall	Conference	Standing
Denver Ministers (Rocky Mountain Conference) (1915–1918)
1915	Denver	4–3	2–3	5th
1916	Denver	4–2–1	3–2	3rd
1917	Denver	9–0	5–0	1st
1918	Denver	3–2	3–1	2nd
Denver:		20–7–1	13–6	
Total:		20–7–1		
National championship Conference title Conference division title or championship game berth
