= Wilmer D. Elfrink =

American football and basketball coach (1893–1948)

Biographical details
- Born: December 27, 1893; Cherokee, Iowa, U.S.
- Died: September 22, 1948 (aged 54); Los Angeles, California, U.S.

Playing career

Football
- 1914–1915: Coe

Coaching career (HC unless noted)

Football
- 1919: Des Moines
- 1920: Fairmount
- 1921: University Farm

Basketball
- 1920–1921: Fairmount
- 1921–1922: University Farm

Head coaching record
- Overall: 11–9–3 (football); 18–7 (basketball)

Wilmer Dale Elfrink (December 27, 1893 – September 22, 1948) was an American college football and college basketball coach.

== Playing career ==
Elfrink played sports while attending Coe College in Cedar Rapids, Iowa. He was a key player on the football team of 1914 under head coach Moray Eby that the college considers to be one of the best teams the school fielded of all time.

== Coaching career ==
=== Wichita State ===
Elfrink was the 12th head football coach at Fairmount College—known as now Wichita State University—Wichita, Kansas, serving for one season, in 1920 season, and compiling a record of 3–4–2. He also served that academic year as head basketball coach, leading his team to a record of 16–2.

=== UC Davis ===
The next year, Elfrink became the head football coach at the University Farm—now known as the University of California, Davis—for the 1921 season.

== Head coaching record ==
=== Football ===
Year	Team	Overall	Conference	Standing	Bowl/playoffs
Des Moines Tigers (Independent) (1919)
1919	Des Moines	5–1–1			
Des Moines:		5–1–1			
Fairmount Wheatshockers (Independent) (1920)
1920	Fairmount	3–4–2			
Fairmount:		3–4–2			
University Farm (Independent) (1921)
1921	University Farm	3–4			
University Farm:		3–4			
Total:		11–9–3			
