= Denver Pioneers football =

Defunct American football team of the University of Denver

- First season: 1884; 142 years ago
- Last season: 1960; 66 years ago
- Location: Denver, Colorado
- Stadium: DU Stadium (capacity: 30,000)
- Colors: Crimson and gold
- Bowl record: 0–3 (.000)

Conference championships
- 1 (Colorado Football Association); 1 (Colorado Faculty Athletic); 2 (Rocky Mountain Athletic); 3 (Mountain States)
- Rivalries: Colorado School of the Mines; Colorado College; Colorado; Colorado State
- Fight song: "D-Rah/Fairest of Colleges"

The Denver Pioneers football team formerly represented the University of Denver in college football.

== History ==
Football was once the most popular sport at the university; the first DU football game was played in 1885 against Colorado College, which is believed to be the first intercollegiate football game played west of the Mississippi River.

Coach John P. Koehler led the team to its first conference titles in 1908 and 1909, and the 1917 team won its league title and went undefeated at 9–0. DU also won the 1933 RMAC co-championship. DU's later football highlights include appearances in the 1946 Sun Bowl, 1947 Alamo Bowl, and 1951 Pineapple Bowl, but without wins. From 1938 to 1960, DU was a member of the Mountain States/Skyline Conference, winning titles in 1945, 1946 and its sixth and final conference title in 1954, which was DU's only national top-20 team, peaking at number 18. The football team played in a 30,000-seat stadium that stood on campus from 1926 to 1971.

The final season for DU football was in 1960; the program was discontinued in January 1961 for financial reasons. The Pioneers were 3–7 in that last season, but won their final game, 21–12, over Colorado State at DU Stadium on Thanksgiving.

Denver sent 12 players to the NFL or All-America Football Conference - with three of them becoming famous: John Woudenberg, a 1942 pro-bowl player for the San Francisco 49ers, Sam Etcheverry, a CFL Hall-of-Famer as player and coach who also played for the St. Louis Cardinals of the NFL, and Don Stansauk, a former Green Bay Packers player who became famous as Hard Boiled Haggerty, a pro-wrestler.

== Conference championships ==
Year	Coach	Conference	Overall record	Conference record
1908†	John P. Koehler	Colorado Football Association	7–1	n/a
1909†	John P. Koehler	Colorado Faculty Athletic Conference	7–2	2–0
1917	John Fike	Rocky Mountain Conference	9–0	4–0
1933†	Percy Locey	Rocky Mountain Conference	5–3–1	5–1–1
1945	Cac Hubbard	Mountain States Conference	4–5–1	4–1
1946†	Cac Hubbard	Mountain States Conference	5–5–1	4–1–1
1954	Bob Blackman	Skyline Conference	9–1	6–1

† Co-champions

== Bowl games ==
Denver participated in three bowl games, losing all three.

Season	Coach	Bowl	Opponent	Result
1945	Cac Hubbard	Sun Bowl	New Mexico	L 24–34
1946	Cac Hubbard	Alamo Bowl	Hardin–Simmons	L 0–20
1950	Johnny Baker	Pineapple Bowl	Hawaii	L 28–27

== All-Americans ==
Season	Player	Position	Team
1936	Alex Drobnitch	G	NEA-1
1945	Ernie Pitts	DE	INS-2
