= List of BYU Cougars football seasons =

The following is a list of BYU Cougars football seasons for the football team that has represented Brigham Young University in NCAA competition.

== Seasons ==
Year	Coach	Overall	Conference	Standing	Bowl/playoffs	Coaches^{#}	AP^{°}
Alvin Twitchell (Rocky Mountain Conference) (1922–1924)
1922	Alvin Twitchell	1–5	1–5	8th			
1923	Alvin Twitchell	2–5	1–5	T–7th			
1924	Alvin Twitchell	2–3–1	1–3–1	10th			
C.J. Hart (Rocky Mountain Conference) (1925–1927)
1925	C.J. Hart	3–3	3–3	T–6th			
1926	C.J. Hart	1–5–1	1–4–1	9th			
1927	C.J. Hart	2–4–1	2–4	7th			
G. Ott Romney (Rocky Mountain Conference) (1928–1936)
1928	G. Ott Romney	3–3–1	1–3–1	10th			
1929	G. Ott Romney	5–3	4–2	4th			
1930	G. Ott Romney	5–2–4	4–1–1	3rd			
1931	G. Ott Romney	4–4	2–3	7th			
1932	G. Ott Romney	8–1	5–1	2nd			
1933	G. Ott Romney	5–4	5–3	5th			
1934	G. Ott Romney	4–5	3–5	7th			
1935	G. Ott Romney	4–4	3–4	T–6th			
1936	G. Ott Romney	4–5	4–4	6th			
Eddie Kimball (Rocky Mountain Conference) (1937)
1937	Eddie Kimball	6–3	5–2	T–3rd			
Eddie Kimball (Skyline Conference) (1938–1941)
1938	Eddie Kimball	4–3–1	3–2–1	2nd			
1939	Eddie Kimball	5–2–2	2–2–2	4th			
1940	Eddie Kimball	2–4–2	2–3–1	4th			
1941	Eddie Kimball	4–3–2	3–1–2	2nd			
Floyd Millet (Skyline Conference) (1942)
1942	Floyd Millet	2–5	1–4	T–6th			
1943	No team						
1944	No team						
1945	No team						
Eddie Kimball (Skyline Conference) (1946–1948)
1946	Eddie Kimball	5–4–1	3–2–1	4th			
1947	Eddie Kimball	3–7	1–5	7th			
1948	Eddie Kimball	5–6	1–3	5th			
Chick Atkinson (Skyline Conference) (1949–1955)
1949	Chick Atkinson	0–11	0–5	6th			
1950	Chick Atkinson	4–5–1	1–3–1	5th			
1951	Chick Atkinson	6–3–1	2–3–1	5th			
1952	Chick Atkinson	4–6	3–4	5th			
1953	Chick Atkinson	2–7–1	1–5–1	T–7th			
1954	Chick Atkinson	1–8	1–6	8th			
1955	Chick Atkinson	1–9	0–7	8th			
Hal Kopp (Skyline Conference) (1956–1958)
1956	Hal Kopp	2–7–1	1–5–1	7th			
1957	Hal Kopp	5–3–2	5–1–1	2nd			
1958	Hal Kopp	6–4	5–2	3rd			
Tally Stevens (Skyline Conference) (1959–1960)
1959	Tally Stevens	3–7	2–5	T–5th			
1960	Tally Stevens	3–8	2–5	5th			
Hal Mitchell (Skyline Conference) (1961)
1961	Hal Mitchell	2–8	2–4	T–5th			
Hal Mitchell (Western Athletic Conference) (1962–1963)
1962	Hal Mitchell	4–6	2–2	T–2nd			
1963	Hal Mitchell	2–8	0–4	5th			
Tommy Hudspeth (Western Athletic Conference) (1964–1971)
1964	Tommy Hudspeth	3–6–1	0–4	5th			
1965	Tommy Hudspeth	6–4	4–1	1st			
1966	Tommy Hudspeth	8–2	3–2	T–2nd			
1967	Tommy Hudspeth	6–4	3–2	3rd			
1968	Tommy Hudspeth	2–8	1–5	7th			
1969	Tommy Hudspeth	6–4	4–3	3rd			
1970	Tommy Hudspeth	3–8	1–6	T–7th			
1971	Tommy Hudspeth	5–6	3–4	4th			
LaVell Edwards (Western Athletic Conference) (1972–1998)
1972	LaVell Edwards	7–4	5–2	T–2nd			
1973	LaVell Edwards	5–6	3–4	4th			
1974	LaVell Edwards	7–4–1	6–0–1	1st	L Fiesta		
1975	LaVell Edwards	6–5	4–3	T–4th			
1976	LaVell Edwards	9–3	6–1	1st	L Tangerine		
1977	LaVell Edwards	9–2	6–1	T–1st		16	20
1978	LaVell Edwards	9–4	5–1	1st	L Holiday		
1979	LaVell Edwards	11–1	7–0	1st	L Holiday	12	13
1980	LaVell Edwards	12–1	6–1	1st	W Holiday	11	12
1981	LaVell Edwards	11–2	7–1	1st	W Holiday	11	13
1982	LaVell Edwards	8–4	7–1	1st	L Holiday		
1983	LaVell Edwards	11–1	7–0	1st	W Holiday	7	7
1984	LaVell Edwards	13–0	8–0	1st	W Holiday	1	1
1985	LaVell Edwards	11–3	7–1	1st	L Citrus	17	16
1986	LaVell Edwards	8–5	6–2	2nd	L Freedom		
1987	LaVell Edwards	9–4	7–1	2nd	L All-American		
1988	LaVell Edwards	9–4	5–3	T–3rd	W Freedom		
1989	LaVell Edwards	10–3	7–1	1st	L Holiday	18	22
1990	LaVell Edwards	10–3	7–1	1st	L Holiday	17	22
1991	LaVell Edwards	8–3–2	7–0–1	1st	T Holiday	23	23
1992	LaVell Edwards	8–5	6–2	T-1st	L Aloha		
1993	LaVell Edwards	6–6	6–2	T–1st	L Holiday		
1994	LaVell Edwards	10–3	6–2	T–2nd	W Copper	10	18
1995	LaVell Edwards	7–4	6–2	T–1st			
1996	LaVell Edwards	14–1	10–0	1st (Mountain)	W Cotton	5	5
1997	LaVell Edwards	6–5	4–4	5th (Mountain)			
1998	LaVell Edwards	9–5	7–2	T–1st (Pacific)	L Liberty		
LaVell Edwards (Mountain West Conference) (1999–2000)
1999	LaVell Edwards	8–4	5–2	T–1st	L Motor City		
2000	LaVell Edwards	6–6	4–3	T–3rd			
Gary Crowton (Mountain West Conference) (2001–2004)
2001	Gary Crowton	12–2	7–0	1st	L Liberty	24	25
2002	Gary Crowton	5–7	2–5	7th			
2003	Gary Crowton	4–8	3–4	3rd			
2004	Gary Crowton	5–6	4–3	3rd			
Bronco Mendenhall (Mountain West Conference) (2005–2010)
2005	Bronco Mendenhall	6–6	5–3	T–2nd	L Las Vegas		
2006	Bronco Mendenhall	11–2	8–0	1st	W Las Vegas	15	16
2007	Bronco Mendenhall	11–2	8–0	1st	W Las Vegas	14	14
2008	Bronco Mendenhall	10–3	6–2	3rd	L Las Vegas	21	25
2009	Bronco Mendenhall	11–2	7–1	2nd	W Las Vegas	12	12
2010	Bronco Mendenhall	7–6	5–3	T–3rd	W New Mexico		
Bronco Mendenhall (Independent) (2011–2015)
2011	Bronco Mendenhall	10–3			W Armed Forces	25	
2012	Bronco Mendenhall	8–5			W Poinsettia		
2013	Bronco Mendenhall	8–5			L Fight Hunger		
2014	Bronco Mendenhall	8–5			L Miami Beach		
2015	Bronco Mendenhall	9–4			L Las Vegas		
Kalani Sitake (Independent) (2016–2022)
2016	Kalani Sitake	9–4			W Poinsettia		
2017	Kalani Sitake	4–9					
2018	Kalani Sitake	7–6			W Famous Idaho Potato		
2019	Kalani Sitake	7–6			L Hawaii		
2020	Kalani Sitake	11–1			W Boca Raton	11	11
2021	Kalani Sitake	10–3			L Independence	22	19
2022	Kalani Sitake	8–5			W New Mexico		
Kalani Sitake (Big 12 Conference) (2023–present)
2023	Kalani Sitake	5–7	2–7	T–11th			
2024	Kalani Sitake	11–2	7–2	T–1st	W Alamo	14	13
2025	Kalani Sitake	12–2	8–1	T–1st	W Pop-Tarts	12	11
Total:		629–445–26					
National championship Conference title Conference division title or championship game berth
^{†}Indicates Bowl Coalition, Bowl Alliance, BCS, or CFP / New Years' Six bowl.; ^{#}Rankings from final Coaches Poll.
