= 1923 Colorado Silver and Gold football team =

American college football season

1923 Colorado Silver and Gold football
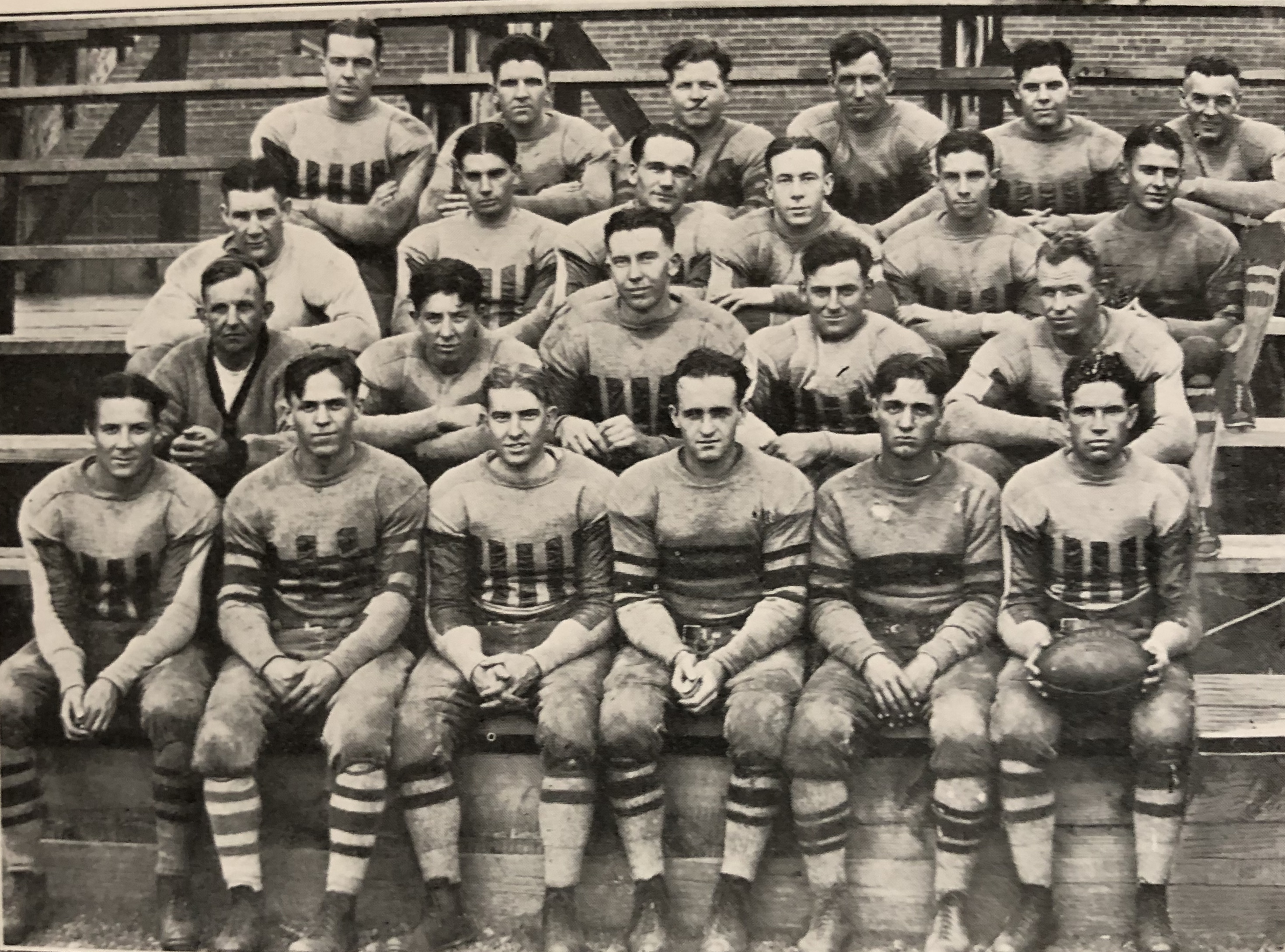

RMC champion
- Conference: Rocky Mountain Conference
- Record: 9–0 (7–0 RMC)
- Head coach: Myron E. Witham (4th season)
- Captain: Art Quinlan
- Home stadium: Gamble Field

1923 Rocky Mountain Conference football standings
	Conf.					Overall
Team	W		L		T	W		L		T
Colorado $	7	–	0	–	0	9	–	0	–	0
Colorado College	6	–	1	–	1	6	–	1	–	1
Colorado Agricultural	5	–	1	–	1	5	–	2	–	1
Utah Agricultural	4	–	2	–	0	5	–	2	–	0
Denver	4	–	3	–	0	6	–	3	–	0
Utah	2	–	3	–	0	4	–	3	–	0
Montana State	1	–	2	–	0	5	–	4	–	0
Colorado Mines	1	–	5	–	0	2	–	5	–	0
BYU	1	–	5	–	0	2	–	5	–	0
Wyoming	0	–	7	–	0	0	–	8	–	0
$ – Conference champion

The 1923 Colorado Silver and Gold football team was an American football team that represented the University of Colorado as a member of the Rocky Mountain Conference (RMC) during the 1923 college football season. In its fourth season under head coach Myron E. Witham, the team compiled a perfect 9–0 record (7–0 against RMC opponents), won the RMC championship, and outscored opponents by a total of 280 to 27. Colorado's 1923 season was part of a 19-game unbeaten streak that began on November 23, 1922, and ended on January 1, 1925.

The conference championship was decided in the final game of the season with the annual rivalry game against Colorado Agricultural. Colorado won the game, 6–3. Neither team scored a touchdown, and Colorado won by kicking its second field goal with 45 seconds remaining in the game. The conference championship was Colorado's first since Fred Folsom's 1913 Colorado team.

Quarterback Art Quinlan was the team captain who led the team's passing attack and also handled kicking duties. Four Colorado players received first-team honors on the 1923 All-Rocky Mountain Conference football team: halfback Fred Hartshorn; end Jack Healy; guard William McGlone; and tackle Douglas McLean.

The team played its home games at Gamble Field in Boulder, Colorado.

== Schedule ==
Date	Opponent	Site	Result	Attendance	Source
October 6	Western State (CO)*	Gamble Field; Boulder, CO	W 51–0		
October 13	Colorado Teachers*	Gamble Field; Boulder, CO	W 60–0		
October 20	BYU	Gamble Field; Boulder, CO	W 41–0		
October 27	at Denver	Broadway Park; Denver, CO	W 21–7		
November 3	Colorado College^{†}	Gamble Field; Boulder, CO	W 17–7		
November 10	vs. Colorado Mines	Denver, CO	W 47–0		
November 17	at Utah	Cummings Field; Salt Lake City, UT (rivalry)	W 17–7	12,000	
November 24	Wyoming	Gamble Field; Boulder, CO	W 20–3		
November 29	at Colorado Agricultural	Colorado Field; Fort Collins, CO (rivalry)	W 6–3		
*Non-conference game; ^{†}Homecoming

== Game summaries ==
=== Western State ===
Only three first-string players from the 1922 Colorado football team returned in 1923. Accordingly, coach Witham and his staff were required to draw on untested players to develop the 1923 roster. After four weeks of practice, the team faced the Western State Mountaineers in Boulder on October 6, 1923. In order to test the candidates at each position, coach Witham sent 35 players into the game. Colorado won by a 51-0 score.

=== Colorado Teachers ===
On October 13, Colorado rolled to its second impressive victory, defeating Colorado Teachers by a 60-0 score. Using a balanced rushing and passing attack, Colorado scored nine touchdowns. G. E. Helmer, sports editor of the Silver and Gold described the team in action against the Teachers as "the smoothest-running team that had worn the Silver and Gold for many years."

=== BYU ===
On October 20, Colorado defeated BYU, 41–0, for its third consecutive shutout victory. Colorado relied heavily on its passing offense, using "strange formations" that left BYU bewildered. G. E. Helmer wrote: "The Mormons could not fathom the overhead game launched by Quinlan with Handy, Healy, Bohn, and Hartshorn on the receiving ends."

=== At Denver ===
On October 27, Colorado defeated Denver, 21–7, on a muddy field in Denver. Colorado's offense was led by the rushing of halfback Fred Hartshorn and the passing of quarterback Arthur Quinlan. Denver's only score came on a 60-yard interception return in the third quarter. G. E. Helmer described the field condition as "deplorable" and wrote: "The mud was six inches deep on all parts of the field except a strip fifteen yards wide which ran down the center." Despite the field conditions, Colorado completed 15 of 30 passes for 206 yards.

=== Colorado College ===
On November 3, Colorado celebrated homecoming with a 17–7 victory over Colorado College. The game was played on a wet field in Boulder. Quinlan kicked a field goal and was credited with "uncanny ability at tossing a wet and slippery ball." Hatfield Chilson had the play of the game, returning a kickoff to Colorado College's one-yard line.

=== Vs. Colorado Mines ===
On November 10, Colorado defeated the Colorado School of Mines, 47–0, on the road in Denver. Colorado scored seven touchdowns in the game. Quinlan broke two bones in his right hand, and he was replaced at quarterback by Hatfield Chilson who "proved an accurate passer and a flashy runner."

=== At Utah ===
On November 17, Colorado defeated Utah, 17–7, before a record crowd of 12,000 spectators at Cummings Field in Salt Lake City. Chilson started at quarterback in place of the injured Quinlan. With Utah leading, Colorado lined up for a field goal to be kicked by Quinlan with his arm in a sling. The ball was snapped to Chilson who threw a touchdown pass to Bohn to tie the score. Earl Loser scored Colorado's second touchdown, and Quinlan kicked a field goal to give Colorado its final tally of 17 points. Hartshorn also returned a kick 60 yards but was caught from behind. G. E. Helmer praised Chilson's performance at quarterback: "Chilson, with his accurate passing, generalship, and flashy running, proved himself to be quite capable of filling the quarterback position."

=== Wyoming ===
On November 24, Colorado defeated Wyoming, 20–3, at Gamble Field in Boulder. Coach Witham played the second string against Wyoming.

=== At Colorado Agricultural ===
On Thanksgiving, November 27, Colorado met Colorado Agricultural at Colorado Field in Fort Collins for their annual rivalry game. Colorado entered the game with several players injured, including halfback William Bohn (broken wrist), tackle Douglas McLean (broken nose), end Richard Handy (sprained ankle), and quarterback Arthur Quinlan (broken throwing hand). Both teams were undefeated against conference opponents, and the winner would be crowned as the conference champion.

Colorado won by a 6–3 score as neither team scored a touchdown, and both teams were limited to field goals. Though not fully healed, team captain Arthur Quinlan returned to the quarterback position and kicked both Colorado field goals. The final, game-winning field goal was set up by "a spectacular dash" by Quinlan "who threw off four Aggie tacklers and raced 63 yards before being stopped." Quinlan then kicked the ball through the cross-bars with only 45 seconds remaining in the game. G. E. Helmer opined that the match was "one of the greatest games ever played in this conference." The victory gave Colorado its first conference championship in 10 years.

== Post-season ==
On November 30, 1923, the All-Rocky Mountain Conference football team selected by the conference coaches was announced. Four Colorado players were named to the first team: halfback Fred Hartshorn; end Jack Healy; guard William McGlone; and tackle Douglas McLean. Three more players were named to the second team: quarterback Arthur Quinlan; halfback William Bohn; and fullback Earl Loser.

On December 3, 1923, the team held its banquet in Boulder. Varsity letters were presented, and halfback Fred Hartshorn was elected by secret ballot as the 1924 team captain. Fullback Earl Loser was elected vice-captain.

== Roster ==
The team's roster included 18 players who were awarded varsity "C" letters for their efforts. The 18 letter winners were:

- William Bohn - halfback (second-team all-conference 1923)
- Hatfield Chilson - quarterback
- Richard Handy - end
- Fred Hartshorn - halfback (first-team all-conference 1923, captain of the 1924 team)
- Jack Healy - end (first-team all-conference 1923)
- Fred Johnson - end
- Donald Keim
- Earl Loser - fullback (second-team all-conference 1923)
- William McGlone - guard (first-team all-conference 1923)
- Douglas McLean - tackle (first-team all-conference 1922-1923)
- William McNary - center
- Kenneth Mead - guard
- Dwight Nichols
- William Plested - tackle
- Arthur Quinlan - captain and quarterback (second-team all-conference 1923)
- Kenneth Sawyer - guard
- Paul Steward
- George Touhy

Others who played for the team but did not receive varsity letters included:

- Scoville - center
- Dickerman - utility

== Coaching staff ==
- Myron Witham - head coach
- Walter B. Franklin - line coach
- C. C. Johnson - assistant coach (freshman football)
- Knowles - assistant coach
- Alva Noggle - assistant coach
- Wolcott - assistant coach
- Edward Montgomery - manager
