= 1922 Iowa State Cyclones football team =

American college football season

1922 Iowa State Cyclones football
- Conference: Missouri Valley Conference
- Record: 2–6 (2–4 MVC)
- Head coach: Sam Willaman (1st season)
- Captain: Deac Wolters
- Home stadium: State Field

1922 Missouri Valley Conference football standings
	Conf.					Overall
Team	W		L		T	W		L		T
Nebraska +	5	–	0	–	0	7	–	1	–	0
Drake +	4	–	0	–	0	7	–	0	–	0
Kansas State	3	–	1	–	2	5	–	1	–	2
Missouri	4	–	3	–	0	5	–	3	–	0
Iowa State	2	–	4	–	0	2	–	6	–	0
Oklahoma	1	–	2	–	2	2	–	3	–	3
Grinnell	1	–	3	–	0	3	–	4	–	1
Kansas	1	–	3	–	1	3	–	3	–	1
Washington University	0	–	5	–	1	1	–	5	–	1
+ – Conference co-champions

The 1922 Iowa State Cyclones football team represented Iowa State College of Agricultural and Mechanic Arts—now known as Iowa State University—during the 1922 college football season. The Cyclones were coached by Sam Willaman and played their home games at State Field in Ames, Iowa. The Cyclones first game was a loss to Coe and their last game was a 54–6 loss to the Nebraska Cornhuskers in Lincoln. The Cyclones finished with a record of 2–6.

== Schedule ==
Date	Time	Opponent	Site	Result	Source
October 7	2:30 p.m.	Coe*	State Field; Ames, IA	L 0–24	
October 14	2:30 p.m.	Missouri^{†}	State Field; Ames, IA (rivalry)	L 3–6	
October 21		at Grinnell	Ward Field; Grinnell, IA	W 7–0	
October 28		Washington University	State Field; Ames, IA	W 13–0	
November 4	2:30 p.m.	at Drake	Drake Stadium; Des Moines, IA	L 7–14	
November 11	2:30 p.m.	at Kansas State	Memorial Stadium; Manhattan, KS (rivalry)	L 2–12	
November 18		Central State Teachers*	State Field; Ames, IA	L 13–14	
November 25	2:30 p.m.	at Nebraska	Nebraska Field; Lincoln, NE (rivalry)	L 6–54	
*Non-conference game; ^{†}Homecoming
