= 1922 Utah Utes football team =

American college football season

1922 Utah Utes football

RMC champion
- Conference: Rocky Mountain Conference
- Record: 7–1 (5–0 RMC)
- Head coach: Thomas M. Fitzpatrick (4th season)
- Captain: Neil Smith
- Home stadium: Cummings Field

1922 Rocky Mountain Conference football standings
	Conf.					Overall
Team	W		L		T	W		L		T
Utah $	5	–	0	–	0	7	–	1	–	0
Colorado Agricultural	5	–	1	–	1	5	–	2	–	1
Denver	3	–	1	–	1	6	–	1	–	1
Colorado Mines	3	–	2	–	1	4	–	2	–	1
Utah Agricultural	3	–	3	–	0	5	–	4	–	0
Colorado College	2	–	2	–	1	3	–	3	–	1
Colorado	2	–	3	–	0	4	–	4	–	0
BYU	1	–	5	–	0	1	–	5	–	0
Wyoming	1	–	7	–	0	1	–	8	–	0
Montana State	0	–	1	–	0	4	–	4	–	0
$ – Conference champion

The 1922 Utah Utes football team represented the University of Utah as a member of the Rocky Mountain Conference (RMC) during the 1922 college football season. Led by fourth-year head coach Thomas M. Fitzpatrick the Utes compiled an overall record of 7–1 with a mark of 5–0 in conference play, winning the RMC title, the first conference championship in program history.

BYU resumed playing football in 1922; the two teams resumed their series for the first time since playing in 1898 when BYU was called Brigham Young Academy.

== Schedule ==
Date	Opponent	Site	Result	Source
October 7	College of Idaho*	Cummings Field; Salt Lake City, UT	W 16–12	
October 14	BYU	Cummings Field; Salt Lake City, UT (rivalry)	W 49–0	
October 21	at Colorado	Gamble Field; Boulder, CO (rivalry)	W 3–0	
October 25	at Wyoming	Campus athletic grounds; Laramie, WY	W 27–0	
November 4	Colorado College^{†}	Cummings Field; Salt Lake City, UT	W 20–7	
November 11	vs. Idaho*	Public School Field; Boise, ID	L 0–16	
November 18	Whitman*	Cummings Field; Salt Lake City, UT	W 24–6	
November 30	Utah Agricultural	Cummings Field; Salt Lake City, UT (rivalry)	W 14–0	
*Non-conference game; ^{†}Homecoming
