= 1922 Colorado Agricultural Aggies football team =

American college football season

1922 Colorado Agricultural Aggies football
- Conference: Rocky Mountain Conference
- Record: 5–2–1 (5–1–1 RMC)
- Head coach: Harry W. Hughes (12th season)
- Home stadium: Colorado Field

1922 Rocky Mountain Conference football standings
	Conf.					Overall
Team	W		L		T	W		L		T
Utah $	5	–	0	–	0	7	–	1	–	0
Colorado Agricultural	5	–	1	–	1	5	–	2	–	1
Denver	3	–	1	–	1	6	–	1	–	1
Colorado Mines	3	–	2	–	1	4	–	2	–	1
Utah Agricultural	3	–	3	–	0	5	–	4	–	0
Colorado College	2	–	2	–	1	3	–	3	–	1
Colorado	2	–	3	–	0	4	–	4	–	0
BYU	1	–	5	–	0	1	–	5	–	0
Wyoming	1	–	7	–	0	1	–	8	–	0
Montana State	0	–	1	–	0	4	–	4	–	0
$ – Conference champion

The 1922 Colorado Agricultural Aggies football team represented Colorado Agricultural College (now known as Colorado State University) in the Rocky Mountain Conference (RMC) during the 1922 college football season. In their 12th season under head coach Harry W. Hughes, the Aggies compiled a 5–2–1 record, finished second in the RMC, and outscored all opponents by a total of 179 to 38.

== Schedule ==
Date	Opponent	Site	Result	Source
October 14	at Wyoming	Campus athletic grounds; Laramie, WY (rivalry)	W 60–0	
October 21	Colorado College	Colorado Field; Fort Collins, CO	T 0–0	
October 28	Utah Agricultural	Colorado Field; Fort Collins, CO	W 34–6	
November 4	at Colorado	Boulder, CO (rivalry)	L 0–7	
November 11	at Drake*	Drake Stadium; Des Moines, IA	L 6–19	
November 18	Colorado Mines	Colorado Field; Fort Collins, CO	W 19–0	
November 25	BYU	Colorado Field; Fort Collins, CO	W 33–0	
November 30	at Denver	Denver, CO	W 27–6	
*Non-conference game
