= 1922 Saint Mary's Saints football team =

American college football season

1922 Saint Mary's Saints football
- Conference: Independent
- Record: 3–6
- Head coach: Slip Madigan (2nd season)
- Home stadium: Recreation Park

1922 Western college football independents records
	Conf.			Overall
Team	W	L	T	W		L		T
La Verne		–		6	–	2	–	2
New Mexico A&M		–		6	–	2	–	0
Arizona		–		6	–	3	–	0
Hawaii		–		5	–	1	–	1
Gonzaga		–		5	–	3	–	0
Nevada		–		5	–	3	–	1
Santa Clara		–		4	–	4	–	1
Cal Aggies		–		3	–	4	–	2
New Mexico		–		3	–	4	–	0
Saint Mary's		–		3	–	6	–	0
Tempe Normal		–		0	–	3	–	1

The 1922 Saint Mary's Saints football team was an American football team that represented Saint Mary's College of California during the 1922 college football season. In their second season under head coach Slip Madigan, the Gaels compiled a 3–6 record and were outscored by their opponents by a combined total of 151 to 67.

== Schedule ==
Date	Opponent	Site	Result	Attendance	Source
October 7	at Nevada	Mackay Field; Reno, NV	L 13–20		
October 14	at California	California Field; Berkeley, CA	L 0–41		
October 21	at Stanford	Stanford Stadium; Stanford, CA	L 0–9		
October 28	New Mexico A&M	Recreation Park; San Francisco, CA	W 19–6		
November 11	at Arizona	Tucson, AZ	L 3–20		
November 19	at Olympic Club	Recreation Park; San Francisco, CA	L 7–28	9,000	
November 30	vs. Santa Clara	California Field; Berkeley, CA	W 9–7	10,000	
December 24	at Hawaii All-Stars	Moiliili Field; Honolulu, HI	W 10–6		
December 31	at Navy Honolulu	Moiliili Field; Honolulu, HI	L 6–14		
