= 1922 Kansas Jayhawks football team =

American college football season

1922 Kansas Jayhawks football
- Conference: Missouri Valley Conference
- Record: 3–4–1 (1–3–1 MVC)
- Head coach: Potsy Clark (2nd season)
- Captain: Severt Higgins
- Home stadium: Memorial Stadium

1922 Missouri Valley Conference football standings
	Conf.					Overall
Team	W		L		T	W		L		T
Nebraska +	5	–	0	–	0	7	–	1	–	0
Drake +	4	–	0	–	0	7	–	0	–	0
Kansas State	3	–	1	–	2	5	–	1	–	2
Missouri	4	–	3	–	0	5	–	3	–	0
Iowa State	2	–	4	–	0	2	–	6	–	0
Oklahoma	1	–	2	–	2	2	–	3	–	3
Grinnell	1	–	3	–	0	3	–	4	–	1
Kansas	1	–	3	–	1	3	–	3	–	1
Washington University	0	–	5	–	1	1	–	5	–	1
+ – Conference co-champions

The 1922 Kansas Jayhawks football team represented the University of Kansas in the Missouri Valley Conference during the 1922 college football season. In their second season under head coach Potsy Clark, the Jayhawks compiled a 3–4–1 record (1–3–1 against conference opponents), finished in eighth place in the conference, and outscored opponents by a combined total of 104 to 75. They played their home games at Memorial Stadium in Lawrence, Kansas. Severt Higgins was the team captain.

== Schedule ==
Date	Opponent	Site	Result	Source
October 7	at Army*	The Plain; West Point, NY	L 0–13	
October 14	at Drake	Drake Stadium; Des Moines, IA	L 0–6	
October 21	Washburn*	Memorial Stadium; Lawrence, KS	W 32–3	
October 28	at Kansas State	Ahearn Field; Manhattan, KS (rivalry)	T 7–7	
November 4	Oklahoma	Memorial Stadium; Lawrence, KS	W 19–3	
November 11	Nebraska^{†}	Memorial Stadium; Lawrence, KS (rivalry)	L 0–28	
November 18	Colorado*	Memorial Stadium; Lawrence, KS	W 39–6	
November 30	at Missouri	Rollins Field; Columbia, MO (Border War)	L 7–9	
*Non-conference game; ^{†}Homecoming
