= 1922 New Mexico A&M Aggies football team =

American college football season

1922 New Mexico A&M Aggies football
- Conference: Independent
- Record: 6–2
- Head coach: Dutch Bergman (3rd season)
- Home stadium: Miller Field

1922 Western college football independents records
	Conf.			Overall
Team	W	L	T	W		L		T
La Verne		–		6	–	2	–	2
New Mexico A&M		–		6	–	2	–	0
Arizona		–		6	–	3	–	0
Hawaii		–		5	–	1	–	1
Gonzaga		–		5	–	3	–	0
Nevada		–		5	–	3	–	1
Santa Clara		–		4	–	4	–	1
Cal Aggies		–		3	–	4	–	2
New Mexico		–		3	–	4	–	0
Saint Mary's		–		3	–	6	–	0
Tempe Normal		–		0	–	3	–	1

The 1922 New Mexico A&M Aggies football team was an American football team that represented New Mexico College of Agriculture and Mechanical Arts (now known as New Mexico State University) during the 1922 college football season. In their third and final year under head coach Dutch Bergman, the Aggies compiled a 6–2 record and outscored all opponents by a total of 210 to 53. The team played home games on Miller Field.

== Schedule ==
Date	Opponent	Site	Result	Attendance	Source
September 30	at Simmons (TX)	Abilene, TX	W 6–0	8,000	
October 6	El Paso High School	Miller Field; Las Cruces, NM	W 39–6		
October 14	United States Indian School	Miller Field; Las Cruces, NM	W 56–0		
October 28	at Saint Mary's	Recreation Park; San Francisco, CA	L 6–19		
November 4	at Arizona	Tucson, AZ	L 7–21		
November 11	Texas Mines	Miller Field; Las Cruces, NM (rivalry)	W 64–0		
November 17	at New Mexico Military	Roswell, NM	W 25–7		
November 29	New Mexico	Miller Field; Las Cruces, NM (rivalry)	W 7–0		
