= 1922 Wyoming Cowboys football team =

American college football season

1922 Wyoming Cowboys football
- Conference: Rocky Mountain Conference
- Record: 1–8 (1–7 RMC)
- Head coach: John Corbett (7th season)
- Captain: George Hegewald
- Home stadium: Campus athletic grounds

1922 Rocky Mountain Conference football standings
	Conf.					Overall
Team	W		L		T	W		L		T
Utah $	5	–	0	–	0	7	–	1	–	0
Colorado Agricultural	5	–	1	–	1	5	–	2	–	1
Denver	3	–	1	–	1	6	–	1	–	1
Colorado Mines	3	–	2	–	1	4	–	2	–	1
Utah Agricultural	3	–	3	–	0	5	–	4	–	0
Colorado College	2	–	2	–	1	3	–	3	–	1
Colorado	2	–	3	–	0	4	–	4	–	0
BYU	1	–	5	–	0	1	–	5	–	0
Wyoming	1	–	7	–	0	1	–	8	–	0
Montana State	0	–	1	–	0	4	–	4	–	0
$ – Conference champion

The 1922 Wyoming Cowboys football team was an American football team that represented the University of Wyoming as a member of the Rocky Mountain Conference (RMC) during the 1922 college football season. In their seventh season under head coach John Corbett, the Cowboys compiled a 1–8 record (1–7 against conference opponents), finishing in ninth place in the RMC. They were shut out in eight of nine games and were outscored by a total of 256 to 13. George Hegewald was the team captain.

== Schedule ==
Date	Time	Opponent	Site	Result	Source
September 30		at Colorado College	Washburn Field; Colorado Springs, CO	L 0–20	
October 7		at Colorado Mines	Golden, CO	L 0–32	
October 14		Colorado Agricultural	Campus athletic grounds; Laramie, WY (rivalry)	L 0–60	
October 25		Utah	Campus athletic grounds; Laramie, WY	L 0–27	
November 4		at Denver	Denver, CO	L 0–7	
November 11		at Utah Agricultural	Adams Field; Logan, UT (rivalry)	L 0–25	
November 14		at BYU	Provo, UT	L 0–7	
November 18	3:15 p.m.	at Gonzaga*	Gonzaga Stadium; Spokane, WA	L 0–77	
November 30		BYU	Campus athletic grounds; Laramie, WY	W 13–0	
*Non-conference game; All times are in Mountain time
