= 1922 Washington University Pikers football team =

American college football season

1922 Washington University Pikers football
- Conference: Missouri Valley Conference
- Record: 1–5–1 (0–5–1 MVC)
- Head coach: George Rider (3rd season)
- Home stadium: Francis Field

1922 Missouri Valley Conference football standings
	Conf.					Overall
Team	W		L		T	W		L		T
Nebraska +	5	–	0	–	0	7	–	1	–	0
Drake +	4	–	0	–	0	7	–	0	–	0
Kansas State	3	–	1	–	2	5	–	1	–	2
Missouri	4	–	3	–	0	5	–	3	–	0
Iowa State	2	–	4	–	0	2	–	6	–	0
Oklahoma	1	–	2	–	2	2	–	3	–	3
Grinnell	1	–	3	–	0	3	–	4	–	1
Kansas	1	–	3	–	1	3	–	3	–	1
Washington University	0	–	5	–	1	1	–	5	–	1
+ – Conference co-champions

The 1922 Washington University Pikers football team represented Washington University in St. Louis as a member of the Missouri Valley Conference (MVC) during the 1922 college football season. Led by George Rider in his third and final season as head coach, the Pikers compiled an overall record of 1–5–1 with a mark of 0–5–1 in conference play, placing last out of nine teams in the MVC. Washington University played home games at Francis Field in St. Louis.

== Schedule ==
Date	Time	Opponent	Site	Result	Attendance	Source
October 7	3:00 p.m.	Missouri Mines*	Francis Field; St. Louis, MO	W 14–6		
October 14		Kansas State	Francis Field; St. Louis, MO	L 14–22	8,000	
October 21	2:30 p.m.	Drake	Francis Field; St. Louis, MO	L 7–31	5,000	
October 28		at Iowa State	State Field; Ames, IA	L 0–13		
November 4		at Grinnell	Grinnell, IA	L 0–16		
November 18	2:30 p.m.	at Missouri	Rollins Field; Columbia, MO	L 0–27		
November 30	2:30 p.m.	Oklahoma	Francis Field; St. Louis, MO	T 0–0		
*Non-conference game; All times are in Central time
