= 1922 BYU Cougars football team =

American college football season

1922 BYU Cougars football
- Conference: Rocky Mountain Conference
- Record: 1–5 (1–5 RMC)
- Head coach: Alvin Twitchell (1st season)

1922 Rocky Mountain Conference football standings
	Conf.					Overall
Team	W		L		T	W		L		T
Utah $	5	–	0	–	0	7	–	1	–	0
Colorado Agricultural	5	–	1	–	1	5	–	2	–	1
Denver	3	–	1	–	1	6	–	1	–	1
Colorado Mines	3	–	2	–	1	4	–	2	–	1
Utah Agricultural	3	–	3	–	0	5	–	4	–	0
Colorado College	2	–	2	–	1	3	–	3	–	1
Colorado	2	–	3	–	0	4	–	4	–	0
BYU	1	–	5	–	0	1	–	5	–	0
Wyoming	1	–	7	–	0	1	–	8	–	0
Montana State	0	–	1	–	0	4	–	4	–	0
$ – Conference champion

The 1922 BYU Cougars football team was an American football team that represented Brigham Young University (BYU) as a member of the Rocky Mountain Conference (RMC) during the 1922 college football season. It was the first team to represent BYU in intercollegiate football. The Cougars compiled an overall record of 1–5 record with an identical mark in conference play, finished eighth in the RMC, suffered shutouts in four of six games, and were outscored by a total of 184 to 10.

== Schedule ==
Date	Opponent	Site	Result	Source
October 7	Utah Agricultural	Provo, UT (rivalry)	L 3–41	
October 14	at Utah	Cummings Field; Salt Lake City, UT (rivalry)	L 0–49	
October 24	Colorado Mines^{†}	Provo, UT	L 0–47	
November 14	Wyoming	Provo, UT	W 7–0	
November 25	at Colorado Agricultural	Fort Collins, CO	L 0–33	
November 30	at Wyoming	Campus athletic grounds; Laramie, WY	L 0–13	
^{†}Homecoming

== Notable firsts ==
On October 7, 1922, in the opening game of the season, right end Nelson drop-kicked a field goal from the 25-yard line for three points – the first points scored in BYU program history.

The team won its first victory in program history, 7–0, against Wyoming on November 14, 1922. The first touchdown in program history was scored on a pass from captain and left halfback Paul Packard to fullback Hunter Manson, who then ran 25 yards to score.

== Personnel ==
Alvin Twitchell was the head coach. Twitchell was a graduate of Utah Agricultural College where he played both basketball and football. Before being hired at BYU (initially as the basketball coach), he coached basketball and football at Monroe High School and Brigham City's Box Elder High School.

In the summer of 1922, Twitchell traveled to the University of Illinois to train in football strategy and technique. He returned to Provo in late August to assemble and train the school's first intercollegiate football team.

The players on the first BYU football team included Bernardino Bowman (LG), Merrill Bunnell (RE), Royal Chamberlain (LH), Buck Dixon (LE), Boney Fuller (QB), Victor Hatch (RT), Elwood Jackson (LG), Keith Maeser (RG), Hunter Manson (FB), Lynn Miller (LE), Frank Morgan (RH), Paul Packard (LH), Truman Partridge (RG), Bowman (LG), Gledhill (C), Fulier (QB), and Ike Young (LT).
