= 1923 Colorado Agricultural Aggies football team =

American college football season

1923 Colorado Agricultural Aggies football
- Conference: Rocky Mountain Conference
- Record: 5–2–1 (5–1–1 RMC)
- Head coach: Harry W. Hughes (13th season)
- Home stadium: Colorado Field

1923 Rocky Mountain Conference football standings
	Conf.					Overall
Team	W		L		T	W		L		T
Colorado $	7	–	0	–	0	9	–	0	–	0
Colorado College	6	–	1	–	1	6	–	1	–	1
Colorado Agricultural	5	–	1	–	1	5	–	2	–	1
Utah Agricultural	4	–	2	–	0	5	–	2	–	0
Denver	4	–	3	–	0	6	–	3	–	0
Utah	2	–	3	–	0	4	–	3	–	0
Montana State	1	–	2	–	0	5	–	4	–	0
Colorado Mines	1	–	5	–	0	2	–	5	–	0
BYU	1	–	5	–	0	2	–	5	–	0
Wyoming	0	–	7	–	0	0	–	8	–	0
$ – Conference champion

The 1923 Colorado Agricultural Aggies football team represented Colorado Agricultural College (now known as Colorado State University) in the Rocky Mountain Conference (RMC) during the 1923 college football season. In their 13th season under head coach Harry W. Hughes, the Aggies compiled a 5–2–1 record, tied for second place in the RMC, and outscored all opponents by a total of 121 to 35. The team played its home games at Colorado Field in Fort Collins, Colorado.

On Thanksgiving, November 27, 1923, Colorado Agricultural met Colorado in Fort Collins for their annual rivalry game. Both teams were undefeated against conference opponents, and the winner would be crowned as the conference champion. Colorado won by a 6–3 score as neither team scored a touchdown, and both teams were limited to field goals. Colorado kicked the final, game-winning field goal with only 45 seconds remaining in the game.

On November 30, 1923, the All-Rocky Mountain Conference football team selected by the conference coaches was announced. Three Colorado Agricultural players were named to the first team: Houser at halfback; Bain at guard; and Weigle at tackle. Between them, Colorado and Colorado Agricultural accounted for seven of the eleven first-team selections.

== Schedule ==
Date	Opponent	Site	Result	Source
September 29	Wyoming	Colorado Field; Fort Collins, CO (rivalry)	W 33–0	
October 6	at Chicago*	Stagg Field; Chicago, IL	L 0–10	
October 13	BYU	Colorado Field; Fort Collins, CO	W 14–6	
October 20	at Colorado College	Colorado Springs, CO	T 6–6	
October 27	at Utah Agricultural	Adams Field; Logan, UT	W 26–7	
November 10	Denver	Colorado Field; Fort Collins, CO	W 25–0	
November 17	at Colorado Mines	Brooks Field; Golden, CO	W 14–0	
November 28	Colorado	Colorado Field; Fort Collins, CO (rivalry)	L 3–6	
*Non-conference game
