= Otto Klum =

American football and basketball coach

Biographical details
- Born: October 17, 1892; Talent, Oregon, U.S.
- Died: September 24, 1944 (aged 51) near Ashland, Oregon, U.S.

Coaching career (HC unless noted)

Football
- 1921–1939: Hawaii

Basketball
- 1921–1923: Hawaii

Administrative career (AD unless noted)
- 1921–1938: Hawaii

Head coaching record
- Overall: 84–51–7 (football); 13–8 (basketball)
- Bowls: 0–1

Otto "Proc" Klum (October 17, 1892 – September 24, 1944) was an American football and basketball coach. He served as the head football coach at the University of Hawaii from 1921 to 1939. Klum is the most successful coach in Hawaii football history having compiled a career record of 84–51–7. His 1925 team went 10–0. Klum was also the head basketball coach at Hawaii for two seasons from 1921 to 1923, tallying a mark of 13–8. Klum was notorious for running up the score. In the 1926 season, his team scored more than 100 points twice. His teams also scored more than 80 points in two other games in 1923 and 1925.

Klum died on September 24, 1944, of a heart attack near Ashland, Oregon. He was born in Talent, Oregon on October 17, 1892. Klum Gym, on the University of Hawaii's Manoa campus, is named after the former coach. Klum is an inductee of the Hawaii Sports Hall of Fame.

== Head coaching record ==
=== Football ===
Year	Team	Overall	Conference	Standing	Bowl/playoffs
Hawaii Deans / Rainbows (Independent) (1921–1939)
1921	Hawaii	3–3–2			
1922	Hawaii	5–1–1			
1923	Hawaii	5–1–2			
1924	Hawaii	8–0			
1925	Hawaii	10–0			
1926	Hawaii	5–4			
1927	Hawaii	5–2			
1928	Hawaii	2–5			
1929	Hawaii	4–3			
1930	Hawaii	5–2			
1931	Hawaii	3–2–1			
1932	Hawaii	2–1–1			
1933	Hawaii	4–3			
1934	Hawaii	6–0			
1935	Hawaii	5–3			
1936	Hawaii	3–5			
1937	Hawaii	2–6			
1938	Hawaii	4–4			
1939	Hawaii	3–6			L Pineapple
Hawaii:		84–51–7			
Total:		84–51–7			
