= 1922 Notre Dame vs. Nebraska football game =

1922 Notre Dame vs. Nebraska
- Non-conference game
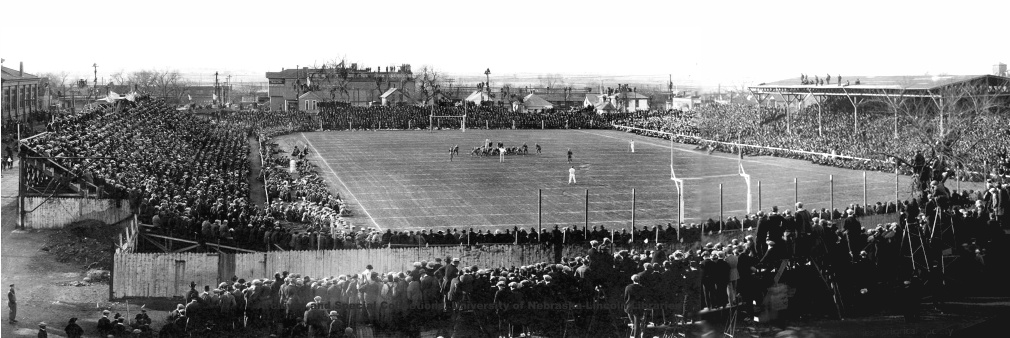
Notre Dame Fighting Irish	Nebraska Cornhuskers
(8–0–1)	(6–1)
6	14
Head coach: Knute Rockne	Head coach: Fred Dawson
	1	2	3	4	Total
Notre Dame	0	0	6	0	6
Nebraska	0	14	0	0	14
- Date: November 30, 1922
- Season: 1922
- Stadium: Nebraska Field
- Location: Lincoln, Nebraska
- Favorite: Notre Dame 3:2
- Referee: Walter Eckersall
- Attendance: Est. 16,000

The 1922 Notre Dame vs. Nebraska football game was a non-conference football game between Notre Dame and Nebraska held on November 30, 1922. It was the final game played at Nebraska Field and one of just two losses across three years for Notre Dame's famed backfield nicknamed the "Four Horsemen."

== Background ==
Notre Dame head coach Knute Rockne was instrumental in popularizing the forward pass after its legalization in 1906 – though its usage was widespread by 1922, few teams used it as prolifically as Notre Dame. Grantland Rice wrote that Rockne's 1921 team was the first "to build its attack around a forward passing game, rather than use a forward passing game as a mere aid to the running game." Early in 1922, Rockne debuted a backfield of Jim Crowley, Elmer Layden, Don Miller, and Harry Stuhldreher that would become known as the "Four Horsemen."

The Nebraska–Notre Dame series was a budding rivalry in the early 1920s. The Cornhuskers gave the Irish their only loss in each of 1915 and 1917, and Notre Dame returned the favor in 1921. Gate receipts, crucial for football programs of the era, were massive for every game of the series (most of which were held in Lincoln due to Nebraska Field's seating capacity exceeding Cartier Field's). Their 1922 meeting on Thanksgiving was billed as a clash of styles between Nebraska's strength and Notre Dame's speed. Both teams were finishing successful seasons: Nebraska had wrapped up a second consecutive MVIAA championship, while undefeated Notre Dame was regarded as one of the country's strongest teams. Nebraska opened as a slight betting favorite, but heavy action on Notre Dame swung the odds to the Irish.

It was the final game at Nebraska Field, set to be demolished at season's end to make room for a steel-and-concrete stadium. John J. Pershing, two years removed from his post as commander of the American Expeditionary Forces during World War I, returned to his alma mater to direct the Cornhusker Marching Band in a pregame routine.

== Game ==
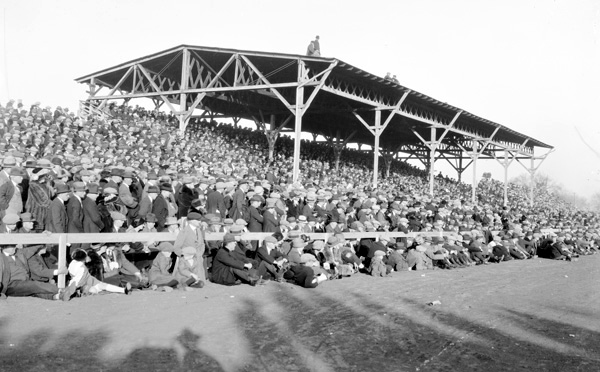
The north grandstand at Nebraska Field during the game

The final game at Nebraska Field was the highest-attended in its fourteen-year existence. The grandstands at the 15,000-seat venue were filled, with an estimated 1,000 additional fans lining fences or climbing atop the wooden awning. Trainer Jack Best, who had served the Nebraska program since its inception in 1890, was in ill health and delivered an emotional pregame speech to the team.

With starting quarterback Glen Preston out with a leg injury, Nebraska received the opening kickoff and immediately exploited its significant weight advantage, marching deep into Notre Dame territory until losing a fumble at the one-yard line. Notre Dame struggled on offense and special teams in the first half, and eventually its worn-out defense allowed NU to open the scoring when Harold Hartley dove into the end zone early in the second quarter. A poor Irish punt put Nebraska back in scoring position, and the Cornhuskers quickly converted on a lateral from Verne Lewellen to halfback Dave Noble that pushed the lead to 14–0. Notre Dame did not gain a first down until late in the half and failed to mount a serious threat before halftime.

Notre Dame turned to its prolific passing attack at the start of the second half, and renewed defensive efforts kept the ball in the hands of the Four Horsemen. Layden connected with Miller on a forty-yard touchdown, though a missed extra point kept the score 14–6. A Nebraska punt was followed by another lengthy Irish drive, and the third quarter ended with Notre Dame inside Nebraska's ten-yard line. With a chance to cut its deficit to a single point (two-point conversions were not instituted until 1958), Notre Dame was instead turned away on downs after an Andy Schoeppel sack of Stuhldreher. Partway through the fourth quarter, Notre Dame's final scoring chance ended when Hartley recovered a Crowley fumble. The Cornhuskers ran out the clock to close Nebraska Field with a 14–6 victory.

=== Scoring summary ===
Qtr	Team	Detail	ND	NU
2	NU	Harold Hartley 2-yd run (Hartley kick)	0	7
2	NU	Dave Noble 38-yd pass from Hartley (Hartley kick)	0	14
3	ND	Don Miller 40-yd pass from Elmer Layden (kick failed)	6	14

=== Statistics ===
(Note: Some statistics are estimates based on data from contemporary news sources, which sometimes varied.)	Notre Dame	Nebraska
First downs	10	19
Rushing yards	72	307
Passing yards	153	50
Total yards	225	357

== Aftermath ==
Team captain Harold Hartley asked celebrating students to refrain from destroying or looting any tokens from Nebraska Field, which was scheduled for demolition months later. Memorial Stadium was constructed on the site and has served as NU's home venue since 1923. Seven years later, Nebraska attempted to hire Rockne away from Notre Dame but instead settled on Texas A&M head coach Dana X. Bible at Rockne's suggestion.

Notre Dame lost in Lincoln again in 1923, the only other defeat of Crowley, Layden, Miller, and Stuhldreher's collegiate careers, but defeated the Cornhuskers 34–6 in 1924 en route to a 10–0 season. The annual series continued until 1925 when Notre Dame administrators canceled it, citing "antagonistic, anti-Catholic behavior" during their visits to Lincoln. The teams have met just five times since.
