= 1922 Drake Bulldogs football team =

American college football season

1922 Drake Bulldogs football

MVC co-champion
- Conference: Missouri Valley Conference
- Record: 7–0 (4–0 MVC)
- Head coach: Ossie Solem (2nd season)
- Home stadium: Drake Stadium

1922 Missouri Valley Conference football standings
	Conf.					Overall
Team	W		L		T	W		L		T
Nebraska +	5	–	0	–	0	7	–	1	–	0
Drake +	4	–	0	–	0	7	–	0	–	0
Kansas State	3	–	1	–	2	5	–	1	–	2
Missouri	4	–	3	–	0	5	–	3	–	0
Iowa State	2	–	4	–	0	2	–	6	–	0
Oklahoma	1	–	2	–	2	2	–	3	–	3
Grinnell	1	–	3	–	0	3	–	4	–	1
Kansas	1	–	3	–	1	3	–	3	–	1
Washington University	0	–	5	–	1	1	–	5	–	1
+ – Conference co-champions

The 1922 Drake Bulldogs football team was an American football team that represented Drake University as a member of the Missouri Valley Conference (MVC) during the 1922 college football season. In its second season under head coach Ossie Solem, the team compiled a 7–0 record (4–0 against MVC opponents), tied with Nebraska for the MVC championship, and outscored opponents by a total of 155 to 26.

The 1922 season remains the only undefeated season in Drake football history. The team's victories included games against Kansas (6–0), Iowa State (14–7), Colorado Agricultural (19–6), and Mississippi A&M (48-6). Of those, Colorado Agricultural (now Colorado State University) was the only one that finished with a winning record (5-2-1).

Starting players on the 1922 Drake team included halfbacks Bill Boelter and Kenneth McLuen, quarterback Sam Orebaugh, center Peterson, guard Denton, and tackle Krueger. Boelter, Orebaugh, Denton, Peterson, and Krueger were selected as first-team players by at least one selector on the 1922 All-Missouri Valley Conference football team.

== Schedule ==
Date	Time	Opponent	Site	Result	Attendance	Source
October 7		Cornell (IA)*	Drake Stadium; Des Moines, IA	W 16–0		
October 14		at Kansas	Memorial Stadium; Lawrence, KS	W 6–0		
October 21	2:30 p.m.	at Washington University	Francis Field; St. Louis, MO	W 31–7	5,000	
November 4		Iowa State	Drake Stadium; Des Moines, IA	W 14–7	7,000	
November 11		Colorado Agricultural*	Drake Stadium; Des Moines, IA	W 19–6		
November 18		Grinnell	Drake Stadium; Des Moines, IA	W 21–0		
November 25		at Mississippi A&M*	Scott Field; Starkville, MS	W 48–6	15,000	
*Non-conference game; All times are in Central time
