= 1922 Cal Aggies football team =

American college football season

1922 Cal Aggies football
- Conference: Independent
- Record: 3–4–2
- Head coach: Chester Brewer (1st season)
- Captain: George Bogart

1922 Western college football independents records
| | Conf. | | | Overall |
| Team | W | L | T | W | | L | | T |
|---|---|---|---|---|---|---|---|---|
| La Verne | | – | | 6 | – | 2 | – | 2 |
| New Mexico A&M | | – | | 6 | – | 2 | – | 0 |
| Arizona | | – | | 6 | – | 3 | – | 0 |
| Hawaii | | – | | 5 | – | 1 | – | 1 |
| Gonzaga | | – | | 5 | – | 3 | – | 0 |
| Nevada | | – | | 5 | – | 3 | – | 1 |
| Santa Clara | | – | | 4 | – | 4 | – | 1 |
| Cal Aggies | | – | | 3 | – | 4 | – | 2 |
| New Mexico | | – | | 3 | – | 4 | – | 0 |
| Saint Mary's | | – | | 3 | – | 6 | – | 0 |
| Tempe Normal | | – | | 0 | – | 3 | – | 1 |

The 1922 Cal Aggies football team represented the Northern Branch of the College of Agriculture—now known as the University of California, Davis—as an independent during the 1922 college football season. The team was known as the Cal Aggies or California Aggies. Led by Chester Brewer in his first and only season as head coach, the Cal Aggies compiled a record of 3–4–2 and outscored their opponents 178 to 53 for the season. The Cal Aggies played home games in Davis, California.

== Schedule ==
| Date | Opponent | Site | Result | Source |
|---|---|---|---|---|
| September 20? | Mare Island | | W 63–0 | |
| September 27 | Mare Island Marines | Davis, CA | L 6–12 | |
| September 30 | at Chico State | College field; Chico, CA | W 49–0 | |
| October 7 | California third varsity | | T 0–0 | |
| October 14 | California freshmen | | L 0–14 | |
| October 21 | California freshmen | California Field; Berkeley, CA | L 0–21 | |
| October 28 | at Nevada | Mackay Stadium (Note: This stadium is the predecessor to the current Mackay Stadium, which was opened for the 1966 season.); Reno, NV | L 2–6 | |
| November 11 | San Jose State | Sacramento, CA | W 58–0 | |
| November 18 | at Fresno State | Fresno, CA | T 0–0 | |
