= 1922 Tempe Normal Owls football team =

American college football season

1922 Tempe Normal Owls football
- Conference: Independent
- Record: 0–3–1
- Head coach: Ernest C. Wills (1st season)
- Home stadium: Normal Field

1922 Western college football independents records
	Conf.			Overall
Team	W	L	T	W		L		T
La Verne		–		6	–	2	–	2
New Mexico A&M		–		6	–	2	–	0
Arizona		–		6	–	3	–	0
Hawaii		–		5	–	1	–	1
Gonzaga		–		5	–	3	–	0
Nevada		–		5	–	3	–	1
Santa Clara		–		4	–	4	–	1
Cal Aggies		–		3	–	4	–	2
New Mexico		–		3	–	4	–	0
Saint Mary's		–		3	–	6	–	0
Tempe Normal		–		0	–	3	–	1

The 1922 Tempe Normal Owls football team was an American football team that represented Tempe Normal School (later renamed Arizona State University) as an independent during the 1922 college football season. In their first and only season under head coach Ernest C. Wills, the Owls compiled a 0–3–1 record and were outscored by their opponents by a combined total of 74 to 31. Pete Brown was the team captain.

== Schedule ==
Date	Opponent	Site	Result	Source
November 4	Mesa High School	Normal Field; Tempe, AZ	L 6–14	
November 25	Phoenix High School	Normal Field; Tempe, AZ	T 13–13	
November 30	Phoenix College	Normal Field; Tempe, AZ	L 0–12	
December 9	at Phoenix College	Riverside Park; Phoenix, AZ	L 12–36	
