= 1922 Nebraska Cornhuskers football team =

American college football season

1922 Nebraska Cornhuskers football

MVC co-champion
- Conference: Missouri Valley Conference
- Record: 7–1 (5–0 MVC)
- Head coach: Fred Dawson (2nd season)
- Home stadium: Nebraska Field

1922 Missouri Valley Conference football standings
| | Conf. | | | | | Overall |
| Team | W | | L | | T | W | | L | | T |
|---|---|---|---|---|---|---|---|---|---|---|
| Nebraska + | 5 | – | 0 | – | 0 | 7 | – | 1 | – | 0 |
| Drake + | 4 | – | 0 | – | 0 | 7 | – | 0 | – | 0 |
| Kansas State | 3 | – | 1 | – | 2 | 5 | – | 1 | – | 2 |
| Missouri | 4 | – | 3 | – | 0 | 5 | – | 3 | – | 0 |
| Iowa State | 2 | – | 4 | – | 0 | 2 | – | 6 | – | 0 |
| Oklahoma | 1 | – | 2 | – | 2 | 2 | – | 3 | – | 3 |
| Grinnell | 1 | – | 3 | – | 0 | 3 | – | 4 | – | 1 |
| Kansas | 1 | – | 3 | – | 1 | 3 | – | 3 | – | 1 |
| Washington University | 0 | – | 5 | – | 1 | 1 | – | 5 | – | 1 |
+ – Conference co-champions

The 1922 Nebraska Cornhuskers football team was an American football team that represented the University of Nebraska in the Missouri Valley Conference (MVC) during the 1922 college football season. In its second season under head coach Fred Dawson, the team compiled a 7–1 record (5–0 against conference opponents), tied for the MVC championship, and outscored opponents by a total of 276 to 28. The team played its home games at Nebraska Field in Lincoln, Nebraska.

== Before the season ==
Now permitted three weeks of pre-season practice, the league champion Cornhuskers prepared under second-year coach Dawson to attempt to repeat as champs. Plans were in motion to build a new playing field and stadium for Nebraska, and this would be the final season of games played on Nebraska Field. Longtime trainer Jack Best, who had been with the program since its very beginning in 1890 through all of the coaching turnovers, was in declining health but came back for the season to help ready his beloved Cornhuskers.

== Schedule ==
| Date | Time | Opponent | Site | Result | Attendance |
|---|---|---|---|---|---|
| October 7 | 2:30 p.m. | South Dakota* | Nebraska Field; Lincoln, NE | W 66–0 | |
| October 21 | 2:30 p.m. | Missouri^{†} | Nebraska Field; Lincoln, NE (rivalry) | W 48–0 | |
| October 28 | 2:00 p.m. | at Oklahoma | Boyd Field; Norman, OK (rivalry) | W 39–7 | |
| November 4 | 2:00 p.m. | at Syracuse* | Archbold Stadium; Syracuse, NY | L 6–9 | 14,000 |
| November 11 | 2:00 p.m. | at Kansas | Memorial Stadium; Lawrence, KS (rivalry) | W 28–0 | |
| November 18 | 2:30 p.m. | Kansas State | Nebraska Field; Lincoln, NE (rivalry) | W 21–0 | |
| November 25 | 2:30 p.m. | Iowa State | Nebraska Field; Lincoln, NE (rivalry) | W 54–6 | |
| November 30 | 2:00 p.m. | Notre Dame* | Nebraska Field; Lincoln, NE (rivalry) | W 14–6 | 16,000 |
*Non-conference game; ^{†}Homecoming; All times are in Central time

== Roster ==
Bassett, Henry (Jr.) T
Berquist, Joy (Jr.) RG
Dewitz, Herbert (Jr.) HB
Dewitz, Rufus (So.) HB
Hartley, Harold "(Sr.)" HB
Hartman, Cecil (Jr.) FB
House, Gordon (Jr.) C
Hoy, George (Sr.) HB
Klemke, George (So.) E
Lewellen, Verne (Jr.) QB
McAllister, Eugene (So.) E
McGlasson, Ross (Jr.) T
Nixon, Bryan (Jr.) G
Noble, Dave (Jr.) HB
Peterson, Carl (Jr.) C
Preston, Glen (Jr.) QB
Russell, Robert (Sr.) QB
Scherer, Leo (Sr.) E
Schoeppel, Andrew (Sr.) E
Thomsen, Fred (Jr.) E
Weller, Raymond (Sr.) T
Wenke, Adolph (Sr.) G

== Coaching staff ==
| Coach | Position | First year | Alma mater |
|---|---|---|---|
| Fred Dawson | Head coach | 1921 | Princeton |
| Henry Schulte | Line coach | 1921 | Michigan |
| Owen Frank | Backfield coach | 1921 | Nebraska |
| Bill Day | Centers coach | 1921 | Nebraska |
| Clarence Swanson | Ends coach | 1922 | Nebraska |
| Farley Young | Freshmen coach | 1921 | Nebraska |
| Jack Best | Trainer | 1890 | Nebraska |

== Game summaries ==
=== South Dakota ===
South Dakota at Nebraska

| Team | 1 | 2 | Total |
|---|---|---|---|
| South Dakota | | | 0 |
| • Nebraska | | | 66 |

- Date: 1922-10-07
- Location: Nebraska Field • Lincoln, Nebraska

South Dakota served as Nebraska's tune up game of the season, and the Coyotes were easily brushed aside with no points as the Cornhuskers cruised and looked ahead to the homecoming game coming up in two weeks. South Dakota's record against Nebraska fell to 1–7–2.

=== Missouri ===
Missouri at Nebraska

| Team | 1 | 2 | Total |
|---|---|---|---|
| Missouri | | | 0 |
| • Nebraska | | | 48 |

- Date: 1922-10-21
- Location: Nebraska Field • Lincoln, Nebraska

Missouri was supposed to be a worthy foe according to some pregame press, but the Cornhuskers rolled up their opponent for the second game in a row, holding the Tigers to just 17 total yards on the day, while playing virtually error-free in the conference opener. Missouri fell further behind in the series as Nebraska began to pull out of sight by leading 13–3.

=== Oklahoma ===
Nebraska at Oklahoma

| Team | 1 | 2 | Total |
|---|---|---|---|
| • Nebraska | | | 39 |
| Oklahoma | | | 7 |

- Date: 1922-10-28
- Location: Norman, Oklahoma
- Game weather: Hot, Wind 30MPH

High winds and high heat complicated matters during Nebraska's first ever trip to Norman, but the outcome was familiar for Nebraska as the Sooners were defeated on their own home field, the 8th straight win for the Cornhuskers going back into the previous season. Oklahoma found itself farther behind in the series 0–3–1.

=== Syracuse ===
Nebraska at Syracuse

| Team | 1 | 2 | 3 | 4 | Total |
|---|---|---|---|---|---|
| Nebraska | 0 | 0 | 6 | 0 | 6 |
| • Syracuse | 3 | 0 | 0 | 6 | 9 |

- Date: November 4
- Location: Archbold Stadium • Syracuse, New York

Nebraska journeyed east again to take on Syracuse as the season's signature eastern game. Coming into the game, the Cornhuskers were feeling confident after three straight wins by a combined margin of 143–7. Playing in muddy conditions unfavorable to the Nebraska game plan, with both teams suffering from miscues, fumbles and penalties, the Orangemen ultimately stunned the Cornhuskers with a late touchdown to go up 9–6 before the final whistle, moving ahead in the series 2–1.

=== Kansas ===
Nebraska at Kansas

| Team | 1 | 2 | 3 | 4 | Total |
|---|---|---|---|---|---|
| • Nebraska | 2 | 7 | 0 | 19 | 28 |
| Kansas | 0 | 0 | 0 | 0 | 0 |

- Date: November 11
- Location: Memorial Stadium • Lawrence, Kansas
- Game weather: Rain

Kansas brought the Cornhuskers to Lawrence to play in their new Memorial Stadium, but Nebraska ruined that game day for the stadium's first season, as the Jayhawks were completely shut down and shut out. Nebraska scored slowly in the first half before blowing it open in the 4th quarter, with the final score coming from backup players giving the starters a rest. Kansas fell farther behind Nebraska in the series, 9–19–1.

=== Kansas State ===
Kansas State at Nebraska

| Team | 1 | 2 | 3 | 4 | Total |
|---|---|---|---|---|---|
| Kansas State | 0 | 0 | 0 | 0 | 0 |
| • Nebraska | 0 | 7 | 14 | 0 | 21 |

- Date: November 18
- Location: Nebraska Field • Lincoln, Nebraska

It was a battle of offensive philosophies in Lincoln, as Kansas State brought in a prolific passing attack, daring the Cornhuskers to stop them. Stop them they did, though, time after time as the Aggies drew in for a score, they were turned away. Meanwhile, the Nebraska running game pounded without stop, eventually putting up 21 points, as Kansas State finished without any points in a second consecutive Nebraska shutout win, their fourth of the year. Nebraska extended their domination over the Aggies by moving to 7–0 all time against them.

=== Iowa State ===
Iowa State at Nebraska

| Team | 1 | 2 | Total |
|---|---|---|---|
| Iowa State | | | 6 |
| • Nebraska | | | 54 |

- Date: 1922-11-25
- Location: Nebraska Field • Lincoln, Nebraska

Iowa State presented no challenge to Nebraska whatsoever, scoring only once on a fast passing play in the second quarter. The six points from that touchdown were swept aside in the flurry of scoring put up by the Cornhuskers, who scored only five minutes into the game and ultimately found the end zone eight times. Nebraska improved their commanding lead over Iowa State, 14–4–1. As one of the only two undefeated teams in conference play, but with one more win than fellow undefeated Drake, this win secured Nebraska's second consecutive league title.

=== Notre Dame ===
Notre Dame at Nebraska

| Team | 1 | 2 | 3 | 4 | Total |
|---|---|---|---|---|---|
| Notre Dame | 0 | 0 | 6 | 0 | 6 |
| • Nebraska | 7 | 7 | 0 | 0 | 14 |

- Date: November 30
- Location: Nebraska Field • Lincoln, Nebraska
- Game attendance: 16,000

Trainer Jack Best, now nearly incapacitated and his health failing at the age of 77, was carried wrapped in blankets from his Grant Hall office to a taxi for the trip to Nebraska Field, and then carried to the Nebraska locker room before the game. Best told the young men that this game would be the last one he would see, and that he wanted a win. Tears were on the players' faces as they emerged onto the field amidst a crowd chanting in honor of Best, to face Knute Rockne's Fighting Irish, featuring rising stars Harry Stuhldreher, Don Miller, Jim Crowley, and Elmer Layden, who would later be known as the Four Horsemen of Notre Dame in coming years. The Cornhuskers were not going to be stopped on this day, and continually gashed Notre Dame for big plays to go up 14–0 by halftime. The Fighting Irish figured out how to stop Nebraska, but could not come up with the matching points. After getting their first 6, Notre Dame drew close again, reaching the Nebraska 2-yard line before a 4th-down 10-yard sack turned them away. Yet another scoring drive culminated in the Irish halfback breaking loose a big run that looked like it would go in, but the ball was lost to a fumble and Notre Dame never seriously threatened to score again. This was the first of only two losses the Four Horsemen would experience in their entire college football careers. Best was granted his wish for a win, and Nebraska closed the series gap by pulling within 3–4–1 against Notre Dame all time.

== After the season ==
Coach Dawson's second year record was a success, matching his first with just a single defeat on the record. His overall career record with the Cornhuskers advanced to 14–2–0 (.875), the program's overall record improved to 188–62–15 (.738), and the program's conference record improved to 32–3–2 (.892).

The season ended in triumph with the emotional Thanksgiving Day win over Notre Dame in Lincoln, but sorrow followed not long after when Jack Best, the only trainer the program had ever known, died less than two months after watching the epic defeat of the Fighting Irish in Nebraska Field's grand finale.
