= 1922 Montana State Bobcats football team =

American college football season

1922 Montana State Bobcats football
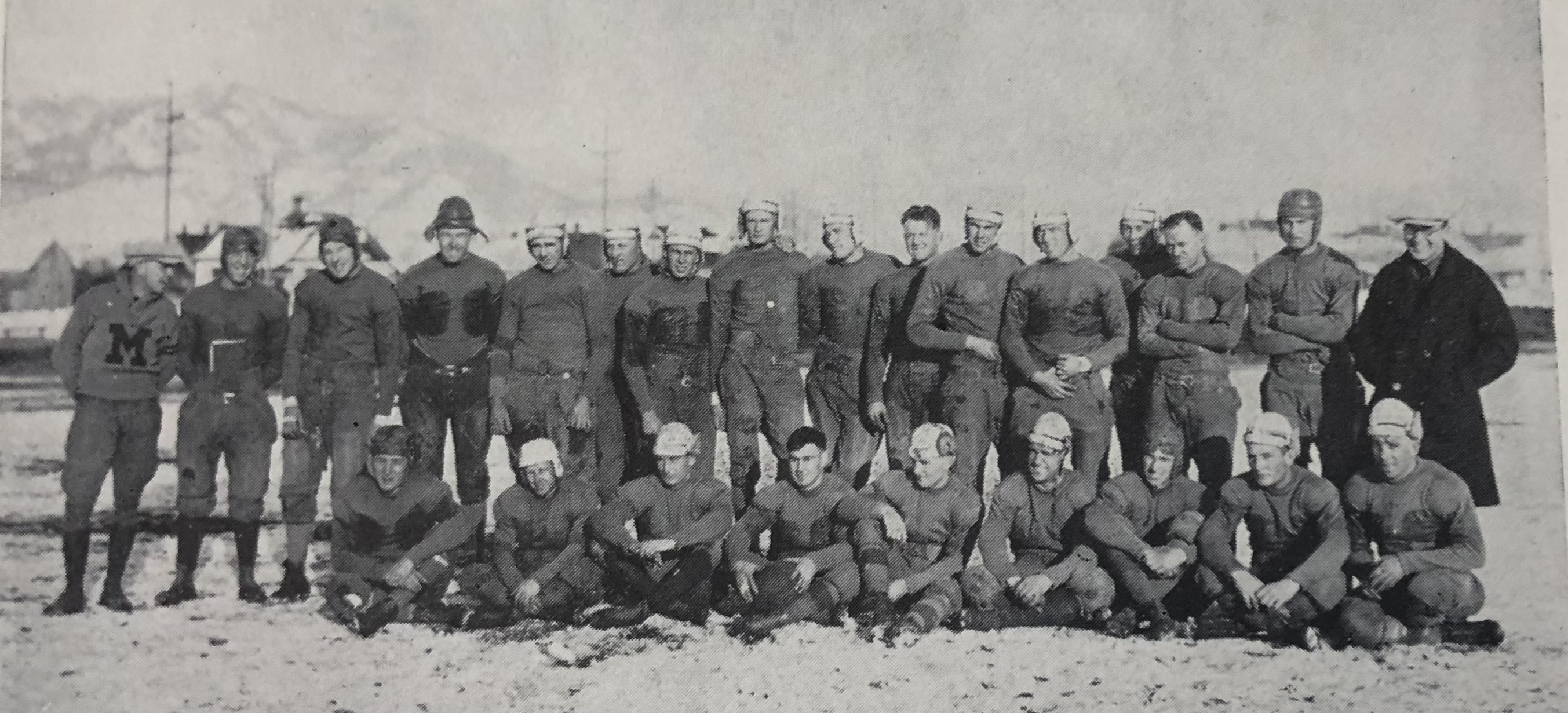
- "The 1922 Bobcat Squad" from "The Montanan 1923"
- Conference: Rocky Mountain Conference
- Record: 4–4 (0–1 RMC)
- Head coach: G. Ott Romney (1st season)
- Captain: Ray McCarren
- Home stadium: Gatton Field

1922 Rocky Mountain Conference football standings
	Conf.					Overall
Team	W		L		T	W		L		T
Utah $	5	–	0	–	0	7	–	1	–	0
Colorado Agricultural	5	–	1	–	1	5	–	2	–	1
Denver	3	–	1	–	1	6	–	1	–	1
Colorado Mines	3	–	2	–	1	4	–	2	–	1
Utah Agricultural	3	–	3	–	0	5	–	4	–	0
Colorado College	2	–	2	–	1	3	–	3	–	1
Colorado	2	–	3	–	0	4	–	4	–	0
BYU	1	–	5	–	0	1	–	5	–	0
Wyoming	1	–	7	–	0	1	–	8	–	0
Montana State	0	–	1	–	0	4	–	4	–	0
$ – Conference champion

The 1922 Montana State Bobcats football team was an American football team that represented Montana State College (later renamed Montana State University) in the Rocky Mountain Conference (RMC) during the 1922 college football season. The Bobcats compiled a 4–4 record (0–1 against RMC opponents), finished last in the conference, and outscored all opponents by a total of 128 to 127. The team lost the annual rivalry game to Montana by a 7–6 score on Armistice Day.

The 1922 season was the school's first under head coach Ott Romney. Romney was hired in the fall of 1922 as both the football coach and as head of the Department of Athletics. He attended the University of Utah and transferred to Montana State as a senior.

Quarterback Ray McCarren was the team captain. McCarren was a senior, studying electrical engineering. He also played for the baseball and basketball teams and served as the Commissioner of Athletics.

Three players received all-state honors: McCarren at quarterback; Champ Hannon at guard; and Frank Hatfeld at end.

== Schedule ==
Date	Opponent	Site	Result	Attendance	Source
October 3	Billings Athletic Club*	Gatton Field; Bozeman, MT	W 46–6		
October 7	Mount St. Charles*	Gatton Field; Bozeman, MT	W 26–3		
October 13	Utah Agricultural	Gatton Field; Bozeman, MT	L 6–39		
October 21	at North Dakota Agricultural*	Dacotah Field; Fargo, ND	L 0–54		
October 23	at Billings Polytechnic Institute*	Billings, MT	W 34–6		
October 28	at Montana Mines*	Clark Park; Butte, MT	W 10–0		
November 4	Gonzaga*	Gatton Field; Bozeman, MT	L 0–12		
November 11	at Montana*	Dornblaser Field; Missoula, MT (rivalry)	L 6–7		
*Non-conference game

== Personnel ==
=== Players ===
The following players played for the 1922 football team:

- William Bawden - fullback
- John Brittain - center
- Clarence Bryan - halfback
- Dewey Cashmore - guard
- Edward Cates
- Alvin Cleveland - guard
- Frank Cowan - tackle
- Norman DeKay - end
- Glenn Fox - halfback
- Champ Hannon - guard, all-state 1922
- Frank Hatfield - end, all-state 1922
- Bruce Hollister - end
- Carl Husemeyer - end
- Arthur Jorgenson
- Leoanrd Jourbert - tacle
- Frank Knight - tackle
- Donald LeCornu - guard
- John Mashin - end, all-state 1920 and 1921
- Donald "Scotty" MacDonald - tackle
- Ray "Hoss" McCarren - captain, quarterback, all-state 1921 and 1922
- Verl McCoy - guard
- Tracy McGuin - fullback
- Arthur McDonald - halfback, chosen captain for the 1923 team
- Kenneth McIvor - center
- George Rassley - quarterback
- Glenn Sands - guard
- Tom Shoebotham - quarterback
- Robert Walter - halfback

=== Staff ===
- Ott Romeny - football coach and director of physical education
- George Van Fleet - football manager
- Harry McCann - assistant football manager
