= 1922 Utah Agricultural Aggies football team =

American college football season

1922 Utah Agricultural Aggies football
- Conference: Rocky Mountain Conference
- Record: 5–4 (3–3 RMC)
- Head coach: Dick Romney (4th season)
- Home stadium: Adams Field

1922 Rocky Mountain Conference football standings
	Conf.					Overall
Team	W		L		T	W		L		T
Utah $	5	–	0	–	0	7	–	1	–	0
Colorado Agricultural	5	–	1	–	1	5	–	2	–	1
Denver	3	–	1	–	1	6	–	1	–	1
Colorado Mines	3	–	2	–	1	4	–	2	–	1
Utah Agricultural	3	–	3	–	0	5	–	4	–	0
Colorado College	2	–	2	–	1	3	–	3	–	1
Colorado	2	–	3	–	0	4	–	4	–	0
BYU	1	–	5	–	0	1	–	5	–	0
Wyoming	1	–	7	–	0	1	–	8	–	0
Montana State	0	–	1	–	0	4	–	4	–	0
$ – Conference champion

The 1922 Utah Agricultural Aggies football team was an American football team that represented Utah Agricultural College in the Rocky Mountain Conference (RMC) during the 1922 college football season. In their fourth season under head coach Dick Romney, the Aggies compiled a 5–4 record (3–3 against RMC opponents), finished fourth in the RMC, and outscored opponents by a total of 132 to 83.

== Schedule ==
Date	Opponent	Site	Result	Source
October 7	at BYU	Provo, UT (rivalry)	W 42–3	
October 13	at Montana State*	Bozeman, MT	W 39–6	
October 16	vs. Montana Wesleyan*	Helena, MT	W 6–0	
October 21	Colorado Mines	Adams Field; Logan, UT	L 0–19	
October 28	at Colorado Agricultural	Colorado Field; Fort Collins, CO	L 6–34	
November 4	Montana Mines*	Adams Field; Logan, UT	W 7–0	
November 11	Wyoming	Adams Field; Logan, UT (rivalry)	W 26–0	
November 30	at Utah	Cummings Field; Salt Lake City, UT (rivalry)	L 0–14	
December 25	vs. Arizona*	State Fair Grounds; Phoenix, AZ	L 6–7	
*Non-conference game
