= 1923 Wyoming Cowboys football team =

American college football season

1923 Wyoming Cowboys football
- Conference: Rocky Mountain Conference
- Record: 0–8 (0–7 RMC)
- Head coach: John Corbett (8th season)
- Captain: C. E. Wittenbraker
- Home stadium: Campus athletic grounds

1923 Rocky Mountain Conference football standings
	Conf.					Overall
Team	W		L		T	W		L		T
Colorado $	7	–	0	–	0	9	–	0	–	0
Colorado College	6	–	1	–	1	6	–	1	–	1
Colorado Agricultural	5	–	1	–	1	5	–	2	–	1
Utah Agricultural	4	–	2	–	0	5	–	2	–	0
Denver	4	–	3	–	0	6	–	3	–	0
Utah	2	–	3	–	0	4	–	3	–	0
Montana State	1	–	2	–	0	5	–	4	–	0
Colorado Mines	1	–	5	–	0	2	–	5	–	0
BYU	1	–	5	–	0	2	–	5	–	0
Wyoming	0	–	7	–	0	0	–	8	–	0
$ – Conference champion

The 1923 Wyoming Cowboys football team was an American football team that represented the University of Wyoming as a member of the Rocky Mountain Conference (RMC) during the 1923 college football season. In their eighth and final season under head coach John Corbett, the Cowboys compiled a 0–8 record (0–7 against conference opponents), finishing in last place out of ten teams in the RMC. They were shut out in five of eight games and were outscored by a total of 265 to 16. C. E. Wittenbraker was the team captain.

== Schedule ==
Date	Opponent	Site	Result	Source
September 29	at Colorado Agricultural	Colorado Field; Fort Collins, CO (rivalry)	L 0–33	
October 6	Colorado College	Campus athletic grounds; Laramie, WY	L 7–34	
October 13	at Utah	Cummings Field; Salt Lake City, UT	L 0–79	
October 20	Wyoming faculty*	Campus athletic grounds; Laramie, WY	L 0–14	
October 27	Colorado Mines	Campus athletic grounds; Laramie, WY	L 0–20	
November 3	at Denver	Denver, CO	L 0–45	
November 16	Utah Agricultural	Adams Field; Logan, UT (rivalry)	L 6–20	
November 24	at Colorado	Gamble Field; Boulder, CO	L 3–20	
*Non-conference game
