= 1922 Gonzaga Bulldogs football team =

American college football season

1922 Gonzaga Bulldogs football

San Diego East-West Christmas Classic, L 13–21 vs. West Virginia
- Conference: Independent
- Record: 5–3
- Head coach: Gus Dorais (3rd season)
- Home stadium: Gonzaga Stadium

1922 Western college football independents records
| | Conf. | | | Overall |
| Team | W | L | T | W | | L | | T |
|---|---|---|---|---|---|---|---|---|
| La Verne | | – | | 6 | – | 2 | – | 2 |
| New Mexico A&M | | – | | 6 | – | 2 | – | 0 |
| Arizona | | – | | 6 | – | 3 | – | 0 |
| Hawaii | | – | | 5 | – | 1 | – | 1 |
| Gonzaga | | – | | 5 | – | 3 | – | 0 |
| Nevada | | – | | 5 | – | 3 | – | 1 |
| Santa Clara | | – | | 4 | – | 4 | – | 1 |
| Cal Aggies | | – | | 3 | – | 4 | – | 2 |
| New Mexico | | – | | 3 | – | 4 | – | 0 |
| Saint Mary's | | – | | 3 | – | 6 | – | 0 |
| Tempe Normal | | – | | 0 | – | 3 | – | 1 |

The 1922 Gonzaga Bulldogs football team was an American football team that represented Gonzaga University during the 1922 college football season. In their third year under head coach Gus Dorais, the Bulldogs compiled a 5–3 record and outscored their opponents 214 to 79.

Dorais' 1922 lineup included back Hust Stockton and end Ray Flaherty. Flaherty later played ten years in the National Football League (NFL) and was inducted into the Pro Football Hall of Fame. Stockton played five years in the NFL and is the grandfather of NBA great John Stockton.

The new Gonzaga Stadium opened this season; the first game was against Washington State on October 14, won by the Cougars with a late field goal, 10–7. After the opening loss, Gonzaga was undefeated in the next ten games at the stadium, with eight wins and two ties.

This year marked the only bowl appearance for the Gonzaga football program, the San Diego East-West Christmas Classic, where they fell, 21–13, to favored West Virginia on Christmas Day.

== Schedule ==
| Date | Time | Opponent | Site | Result | Attendance | Source |
|---|---|---|---|---|---|---|
| October 7 | 2:25 p.m. | at Puget Sound | Tacoma Stadium; Tacoma, WA | W 34–0 | | |
| October 14 | | Washington State | Gonzaga Stadium; Spokane, WA | L 7–10 | 6,000 | |
| October 21 | 2:30 p.m. | at Multnomah Athletic Club | Multnomah Stadium; Portland, OR | L 20–35 | 3,000 | |
| October 28 | | Montana | Gonzaga Stadium; Spokane, WA | W 37–6 | | |
| November 4 | | at Montana State | Gatton Field; Bozeman, MT | W 12–0 | | |
| November 18 | 2:15 p.m. | Wyoming | Gonzaga Stadium; Spokane, WA | W 77–0 | | |
| November 25 | | Idaho | Gonzaga Stadium; Spokane, WA | W 14–7 | | |
| December 25 | | vs. West Virginia | Balboa Stadium; San Diego, CA (San Diego East-West Christmas Classic) | L 13–21 | 15,000 | |
All times are in Pacific time; Source:
