= 1922 Nevada Sagebrushers football team =

American college football season

1922 Nevada Sagebrushers football
- Conference: Independent
- Record: 5–3–1
- Head coach: Ray Courtright (4th season)
- Home stadium: Mackay Field

1922 Western college football independents records
	Conf.			Overall
Team	W	L	T	W		L		T
La Verne		–		6	–	2	–	2
New Mexico A&M		–		6	–	2	–	0
Arizona		–		6	–	3	–	0
Hawaii		–		5	–	1	–	1
Gonzaga		–		5	–	3	–	0
Nevada		–		5	–	3	–	1
Santa Clara		–		4	–	4	–	1
Cal Aggies		–		3	–	4	–	2
New Mexico		–		3	–	4	–	0
Saint Mary's		–		3	–	6	–	0
Tempe Normal		–		0	–	3	–	1

The 1922 Nevada Sagebrushers football team was an American football team that represented the University of Nevada as an independent during the 1922 college football season. In their fourth season under head coach Ray Courtright, the team compiled a 5–3–1 record and outscored its opponents by a total of 166 to 120.

George Hobbs was the 1922 team captain.

== Schedule ==
Date	Opponent	Site	Result	Source
September 30	Agnetian Club	Mackay Field; Reno, NV	W 42–7	
October 7	at Saint Mary's	Mackay Field; Reno, NV	W 21–13	
October 14	Occidental	Mackay Field; Reno, NV	W 35–0	
October 21	at USC	Bovard Field; Los Angeles, CA	L 0–6	
October 28	Cal Aggies	Mackay Field; Reno, NV	W 6–2	
November 4	at Stanford	Stanford Stadium; Stanford, CA	L 7–17	
November 11	Whitman	Mackay Field; Reno, NV	W 35–7	
November 18	at California	California Field; Berkeley, CA	L 13–61	
November 25	Santa Clara	Mackay Field; Reno, NV	T 7–7	
