= 1922 Hawaii Deans football team =

American college football season

1922 Hawaii Deans football
- Conference: Independent
- Record: 5–1–1
- Head coach: Otto Klum (2nd season)
- Captain: Wilson Jacobson
- Home stadium: Moiliili Field

1922 Western college football independents records
	Conf.			Overall
Team	W	L	T	W		L		T
La Verne		–		6	–	2	–	2
New Mexico A&M		–		6	–	2	–	0
Arizona		–		6	–	3	–	0
Hawaii		–		5	–	1	–	1
Gonzaga		–		5	–	3	–	0
Nevada		–		5	–	3	–	1
Santa Clara		–		4	–	4	–	1
Cal Aggies		–		3	–	4	–	2
New Mexico		–		3	–	4	–	0
Saint Mary's		–		3	–	6	–	0
Tempe Normal		–		0	–	3	–	1

The 1922 Hawaii Deans football team represented the University of Hawaiʻi (now known as the University of Hawaiʻi at Mānoa) as an independent during the 1922 college football season. Led by second-year head coach Otto Klum, the Deans compiled an overall record of 5–1–1. Wilson Jacobson was the team captain.

== Schedule ==
Date	Opponent	Site	Result	Attendance	Source
October 7	13th Field Artillery	Moiliili Field; Honolulu, Territory of Hawaii	W 20–0	2,000	
October 14	Fort Ruger	Moiliili Field; Honolulu, Territory of Hawaii	W 88–0		
November 4	Hawaii National Guard	Moiliili Field; Honolulu, Territory of Hawaii	W 40–0		
November 11	Pālama	Moiliili Field; Honolulu, Territory of Hawaii	W 27–0		
November 25	Pearl Harbor Navy	Moiliili Field; Honolulu, Territory of Hawaii	L 10–13		
December 9	Honolulu Town Team	Moiliili Field; Honolulu, Territory of Hawaii	T 6–6		
December 25	Pomona	Moiliili Field; Honolulu, Territory of Hawaii	W 25–6		
