= 1922 Kansas State Wildcats football team =

American college football season

1922 Kansas State Wildcats football
- Conference: Missouri Valley Conference
- Record: 5–1–2 (3–1–2 MVC)
- Head coach: Charlie Bachman (3rd season)
- Offensive scheme: Notre Dame Box
- Home stadium: Memorial Stadium

1922 Missouri Valley Conference football standings
| | Conf. | | | | | Overall |
| Team | W | | L | | T | W | | L | | T |
|---|---|---|---|---|---|---|---|---|---|---|
| Nebraska + | 5 | – | 0 | – | 0 | 7 | – | 1 | – | 0 |
| Drake + | 4 | – | 0 | – | 0 | 7 | – | 0 | – | 0 |
| Kansas State | 3 | – | 1 | – | 2 | 5 | – | 1 | – | 2 |
| Missouri | 4 | – | 3 | – | 0 | 5 | – | 3 | – | 0 |
| Iowa State | 2 | – | 4 | – | 0 | 2 | – | 6 | – | 0 |
| Oklahoma | 1 | – | 2 | – | 2 | 2 | – | 3 | – | 3 |
| Grinnell | 1 | – | 3 | – | 0 | 3 | – | 4 | – | 1 |
| Kansas | 1 | – | 3 | – | 1 | 3 | – | 3 | – | 1 |
| Washington University | 0 | – | 5 | – | 1 | 1 | – | 5 | – | 1 |
+ – Conference co-champions

The 1922 Kansas State Wildcats football team represented Kansas State Agricultural College in the 1922 college football season. The 1922 Wildcats finished with a record of 5–1–2 overall and a 3–1–2 mark in Missouri Valley Conference play.

The team's head coach was future College Football Hall of Famer Charlie Bachman. The Wildcats played their home games in brand new Memorial Stadium, which opened that year. Before the season started, Bachman arranged for a live wildcat to be kept on the sidelines of the new stadium as team mascot. The wildcat was named "Touchdown," and the live mascot started a tradition that lasted over 50 years, until it was ended in the 1970s with the death of "Touchdown VIII."

At the conclusion of the season, guard Ray D. Hahn was named a first team All-American by Grantland Rice, becoming the first football player in school history to be so honored.

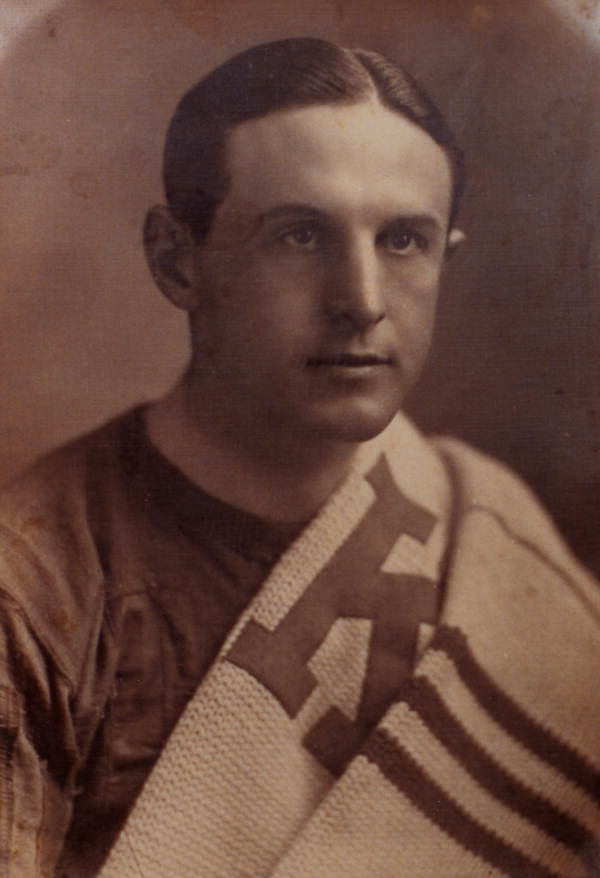
All-conference player Tom Sebring in 1922

== Schedule ==
| Date | Opponent | Site | Result | Attendance | Source |
|---|---|---|---|---|---|
| October 7 | Washburn* | Memorial Stadium; Manhattan, KS | W 47–0 | | |
| October 14 | at Washington University | Francis Field; St. Louis, MO | W 22-14 | 8,000 | |
| October 21 | at Oklahoma | Boyd Field; Norman, OK | T 7–7 | | |
| October 28 | Kansas^{†} | Memorial Stadium; Manhattan, KS (rivalry) | T 7–7 | | |
| November 4 | at Missouri | Rollins Field; Columbia, MO | W 14–10 | | |
| November 11 | Iowa State | Memorial Stadium; Manhattan, KS (rivalry) | W 12–2 | | |
| November 18 | at Nebraska | Nebraska Field; Lincoln, NE (rivalry) | L 0-21 | | |
| November 30 | TCU* | Memorial Stadium; Manhattan, KS | W 45–0 | | |
*Non-conference game; ^{†}Homecoming
