= 1923 Montana State Bobcats football team =

American college football season

1923 Montana State Bobcats football
- Conference: Rocky Mountain Conference
- Record: 5–4 (1–2 RMC)
- Head coach: G. Ott Romney (2nd season)
- Home stadium: Gatton Field

1923 Rocky Mountain Conference football standings
	Conf.					Overall
Team	W		L		T	W		L		T
Colorado $	7	–	0	–	0	9	–	0	–	0
Colorado College	6	–	1	–	1	6	–	1	–	1
Colorado Agricultural	5	–	1	–	1	5	–	2	–	1
Utah Agricultural	4	–	2	–	0	5	–	2	–	0
Denver	4	–	3	–	0	6	–	3	–	0
Utah	2	–	3	–	0	4	–	3	–	0
Montana State	1	–	2	–	0	5	–	4	–	0
Colorado Mines	1	–	5	–	0	2	–	5	–	0
BYU	1	–	5	–	0	2	–	5	–	0
Wyoming	0	–	7	–	0	0	–	8	–	0
$ – Conference champion

The 1923 Montana State Bobcats football team was an American football team that represented Montana State College (later renamed Montana State University) in the Rocky Mountain Conference (RMC) during the 1923 college football season. In its second season under head coach G. Ott Romney, the team compiled a 5–4 record (1–2 against RMC opponents), finished seventh in the conference, and outscored all opponents by a total of 272 to 69.

== Schedule ==
Date	Opponent	Site	Result	Attendance	Source
September 29	at BYU	University Field; Provo, UT	L 15–16	800	
October 6	at Idaho Technical*	Hutchinson Field; Pocatello, ID	W 41–0		
October 18	Denver	Gatton Field; Bozeman, MT	L 6–7		
October 27	Montana Mines*	Gatton Field; Bozeman, MT	L 2–7		
November 3	Montana Wesleyan*	Gatton Field; Bozeman, MT	W 30–3		
November 10	at Mount St. Charles*	Hilltop Field; Helena, MT	W 83–0		
November 17	Montana*	Gatton Field; Bozeman, MT (rivalry)	L 13–24		
November 24	at Colorado Teachers	Greeley, CO	W 48–12		
November 29	at New Mexico*	Varsity Field; Albuquerque, NM	W 34–0		
*Non-conference game
