= 1922 Oklahoma Sooners football team =

American college football season

1922 Oklahoma Sooners football
- Conference: Missouri Valley Conference
- Record: 2–3–3 (1–2–2 MVC)
- Head coach: Bennie Owen (18th season)
- Offensive scheme: Single-wing
- Captains: Tarzan Marsh; Van Edmondson
- Home stadium: Boyd Field

1922 Missouri Valley Conference football standings
	Conf.					Overall
Team	W		L		T	W		L		T
Nebraska +	5	–	0	–	0	7	–	1	–	0
Drake +	4	–	0	–	0	7	–	0	–	0
Kansas State	3	–	1	–	2	5	–	1	–	2
Missouri	4	–	3	–	0	5	–	3	–	0
Iowa State	2	–	4	–	0	2	–	6	–	0
Oklahoma	1	–	2	–	2	2	–	3	–	3
Grinnell	1	–	3	–	0	3	–	4	–	1
Kansas	1	–	3	–	1	3	–	3	–	1
Washington University	0	–	5	–	1	1	–	5	–	1
+ – Conference co-champions

The 1922 Oklahoma Sooners football team represented the University of Oklahoma as a member of the Missouri Valley Conference (MVC) during the 1922 college football season. In their 18th season under head coach Bennie Owen, the Sooners compiled an overall record of 2–3–3 record with a mark of 1–2–2 in conference play, placing sixth in the MVC, and were outscored by opponents by a combined total of 114 to 66.

No Sooners were recognized as All-Americans, and end Howard Marsh was the only Sooner to receive all-conference honors.

== Schedule ==
Date	Time	Opponent	Site	Result	Source
October 14		Central State Teachers*	Boyd Field; Norman, OK	W 21–0	
October 21		Kansas State	Boyd Field; Norman, OK	T 7–7	
October 28		Nebraska	Boyd Field; Norman, OK (rivalry)	L 7–39	
November 4		at Kansas	Memorial Stadium; Lawrence, KS	L 3–19	
November 11		Missouri	Boyd Field; Norman, OK (rivalry)	W 18–14	
November 18		Texas*	Boyd Field; Norman, OK (Red River Shootout)	L 7–32	
November 25		at Oklahoma A&M*	Lewis Field; Stillwater, OK (Bedlam)	T 3–3	
November 30	2:30 p.m.	at Washington University	Francis Field; St. Louis, MO	T 0–0	
*Non-conference game; All times are in Central time
