= 1922 New Mexico Lobos football team =

American college football season

1922 New Mexico Lobos football
- Conference: Independent
- Record: 3–4
- Head coach: Roy W. Johnson (3rd season)
- Captain: John Richard Popejoy
- Home stadium: Varsity field

1922 Western college football independents records
	Conf.			Overall
Team	W	L	T	W		L		T
La Verne		–		6	–	2	–	2
New Mexico A&M		–		6	–	2	–	0
Arizona		–		6	–	3	–	0
Hawaii		–		5	–	1	–	1
Gonzaga		–		5	–	3	–	0
Nevada		–		5	–	3	–	1
Santa Clara		–		4	–	4	–	1
Cal Aggies		–		3	–	4	–	2
New Mexico		–		3	–	4	–	0
Saint Mary's		–		3	–	6	–	0
Tempe Normal		–		0	–	3	–	1

The 1922 New Mexico Lobos football team represented the University of New Mexico as an independent during the 1922 college football season. In their third season under head coach Roy W. Johnson, the Lobos compiled a 3–4 record.

John Richard Popejoy was the team captain. Ogle Jones played halfback for the team. Jones was recognized in 1949 as "the greatest football player who ever performed for the honor and glory of the University of New Mexico."

== Schedule ==
Date	Opponent	Site	Result	Source
September 30	Albuquerque Indian School	Varsity field; Albuquerque, NM	W 33–0	
October 7	Denver	Varsity field; Albuquerque, NM	L 0–41	
October 14	at Colorado	Gamble Field; Boulder, CO	L 0–3	
October 28	Texas Mines	Varsity field; Albuquerque, NM	W 13–0	
November 4	West Texas State	Varsity field; Albuquerque, NM	W 12–0	
November 18	at Arizona	Varsity field; Albuquerque, NM (rivalry)	L 0–10	
November 30	at New Mexico A&M	Miller Field; Las Cruces, NM (rivalry)	L 0–7	
