= 1923 Utah Agricultural Aggies football team =

American college football season

1923 Utah Agricultural Aggies football
- Conference: Rocky Mountain Conference
- Record: 5–2 (4–2 RMC)
- Head coach: Dick Romney (5th season)
- Home stadium: Adams Field

1923 Rocky Mountain Conference football standings
	Conf.					Overall
Team	W		L		T	W		L		T
Colorado $	7	–	0	–	0	9	–	0	–	0
Colorado College	6	–	1	–	1	6	–	1	–	1
Colorado Agricultural	5	–	1	–	1	5	–	2	–	1
Utah Agricultural	4	–	2	–	0	5	–	2	–	0
Denver	4	–	3	–	0	6	–	3	–	0
Utah	2	–	3	–	0	4	–	3	–	0
Montana State	1	–	2	–	0	5	–	4	–	0
Colorado Mines	1	–	5	–	0	2	–	5	–	0
BYU	1	–	5	–	0	2	–	5	–	0
Wyoming	0	–	7	–	0	0	–	8	–	0
$ – Conference champion

The 1923 Utah State Aggies football team was an American football team that represented Utah State Agricultural College in the Rocky Mountain Conference (RMC) during the 1923 college football season. In their fifth season under head coach Dick Romney, the Aggies compiled a 5–2 record (4–2 against RMC opponents), finished fourth in the RMC, and outscored opponents by a total of 147 to 59.

== Schedule ==
Date	Opponent	Site	Result	Source
October 6	at Montana Mines*		W 26–0	
October 13	Denver	Adams Field; Logan, UT	L 7–14	
October 20	at Colorado Mines	Brooks Field; Golden, CO	W 26–0	
October 27	Colorado Agricultural	Adams Field; Logan, UT	L 7–26	
November 12	BYU	Adams Field; Logan, UT (rivalry)	W 40–0	
November 16	at Wyoming	Adams Field; Logan, UT (rivalry)	W 20–6	
November 29	at Utah	Cummings Field; Salt Lake City, UT (rivalry)	W 21–13	
*Non-conference game
