= 1922 Missouri Tigers football team =

American college football season

1922 Missouri Tigers football
- Conference: Missouri Valley Conference
- Record: 5–3 (4–3 MVC)
- Head coach: Thomas Kelley (1st season)
- Captain: Herbert Blumer
- Home stadium: Rollins Field

1922 Missouri Valley Conference football standings
	Conf.					Overall
Team	W		L		T	W		L		T
Nebraska +	5	–	0	–	0	7	–	1	–	0
Drake +	4	–	0	–	0	7	–	0	–	0
Kansas State	3	–	1	–	2	5	–	1	–	2
Missouri	4	–	3	–	0	5	–	3	–	0
Iowa State	2	–	4	–	0	2	–	6	–	0
Oklahoma	1	–	2	–	2	2	–	3	–	3
Grinnell	1	–	3	–	0	3	–	4	–	1
Kansas	1	–	3	–	1	3	–	3	–	1
Washington University	0	–	5	–	1	1	–	5	–	1
+ – Conference co-champions

The 1922 Missouri Tigers football team was an American football team that represented the University of Missouri in the Missouri Valley Intercollegiate Athletic Association (Missouri Valley) during the 1922 college football season. The team compiled a 5–3 record (4–3 against Missouri Valley opponents), finished in fourth place in the Missouri Valley conference, and outscored all opponents by a combined total of 98 to 90. Thomas Kelley was the head coach for his first and only season. The team played its home games at Rollins Field in Columbia, Missouri.

== Schedule ==
Date	Time	Opponent	Site	Result	Attendance	Source
October 7		Grinnell	Rollins Field; Columbia, MO	W 23–0		
October 14		at Iowa State	State Field; Ames, IA (rivalry)	W 6–3		
October 21		at Nebraska	Nebraska Field; Lincoln, NE (rivalry)	L 0–48		
October 28	2:30 p.m.	at Saint Louis*	Sportsman's Park; St. Louis, MO	W 9–0	10,000	
November 4		Kansas State	Rollins Field; Columbia, MO	L 10–13		
November 11		at Oklahoma	Boyd Field; Norman, OK (rivalry)	L 14–18		
November 18	2:30 p.m.	Washington University	Rollins Field; Columbia, MO	W 27–0		
November 30		Kansas	Rollins Field; Columbia, MO (rivalry)	W 9–7		
*Non-conference game; All times are in Central time
