= Van Edmondson =

American football player (1899–1998)

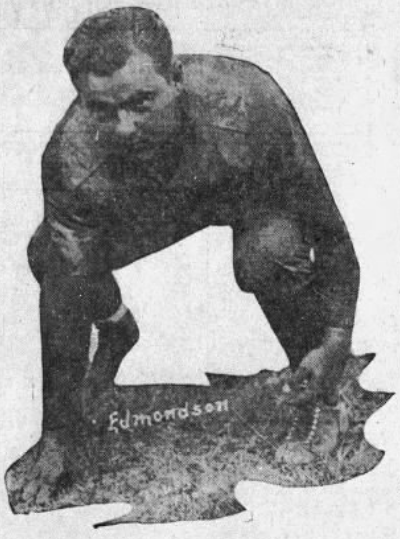
- Edmondson pictured in The Austin American, 1922

No. 6
- Position: Center

Personal information
- Born: June 6, 1899; Delaware County, Oklahoma, U.S.
- Died: March 4, 1998 (aged 98); San Antonio, Texas, U.S.
- Listed height: 5 ft 10 in (1.78 m)
- Listed weight: 210 lb (95 kg)

Career information
- High school: Marysville (AR)
- College: Oklahoma

Career history
- Buffalo Rangers (1926)

Career statistics
- Games played: 5
- Games started: 3
- Stats at Pro Football Reference

Augustus Van Edmondson (June 6, 1899 – March 4, 1998) was an American football center who played one season in the National Football League (NFL) for the Buffalo Rangers. He played college football for Oklahoma, and was team captain as a senior.

Edmondson was born on June 6, 1899, in Delaware County, Oklahoma. He attended Marysville High School in Arkansas, and first played football in 1916. He joined the United States Army in c. 1917, serving in World War I and playing on a military service football team. He joined the University of Oklahoma after the war, playing on the freshman football team in 1919. He earned his first varsity playing time in early 1920 after an injury to a lineman. His profile in The Ponca City News said the following:

"Gus [Edmondson] made his "O" in the Piker battle at St. Louis, relieving Deacon in the first half, and he has played every minute of every game since. Edmondson is a sophomore and he will have two more years with the varsity. The youngest lineman in point of Sooner service, weighs 204 pounds, he puts every ounce of it into fight and the opposition finds him a very tough proposition to run a play through, in fact a play over him is seldom successful."

Originally a guard, Edmondson was shifted to tackle in 1921. Following his junior year, in which he earned a letter and was named honorable mention all-conference, he was selected as the team's alternative captain for the 1922 season. At the start of his senior season, Howard Marsh, the captain-elect, was declared ineligible, making Edmondson team captain. Marsh returned on November 11 and took over the team leadership duties. After graduating, he served as president of the athletic association, a position he was elected to in March 1922.

In 1926, after being out of football for four years, Edmondson signed with the Buffalo Rangers of the National Football League (NFL). He wore number 6, and played the center position. He appeared in five games, (Note: Pro Football Archives lists six games played.) and was a starter in three of them. The Rangers finished the season with a 4–4–2 record, placing ninth in the league. He did not return with the team in the following season, and retired from football.

Edmondson died on March 4, 1998, in San Antonio, Texas, at the age of 98. He was the last living former Ranger, and was one of the oldest living former players at the time of his death.
