= 1922 Santa Clara Missionites football team =

American college football season

1922 Santa Clara Missionites football
- Conference: Independent
- Record: 4–4–1
- Head coach: Harry G. Buckingham (2nd season)
- Home stadium: Mission Field, Ewing Field

1922 Western college football independents records
	Conf.			Overall
Team	W	L	T	W		L		T
La Verne		–		6	–	2	–	2
New Mexico A&M		–		6	–	2	–	0
Arizona		–		6	–	3	–	0
Hawaii		–		5	–	1	–	1
Gonzaga		–		5	–	3	–	0
Nevada		–		5	–	3	–	1
Santa Clara		–		4	–	4	–	1
Cal Aggies		–		3	–	4	–	2
New Mexico		–		3	–	4	–	0
Saint Mary's		–		3	–	6	–	0
Tempe Normal		–		0	–	3	–	1

The 1922 Santa Clara Missionites football team was an American football team that represented Santa Clara University as an independent during the 1922 college football season. In their second and final season under head coach Harry G. Buckingham, the Missionites compiled a 4–4–1 record.

In December 1922, Buckingham resigned as the school's football coach. He cited "complete disagreement with the athletic management" as the reason for his resignation.

== Schedule ==
Date	Opponent	Site	Result	Attendance	Source
September 9	Agnetian Club	Mission Field; Santa Clara, CA	W 16–0		
September 22	San Pedro Submarine Base	Mission Field; Santa Clara	W 72–0		
September 30	at California	California Field; Berkeley, CA	L 14–45		
October 14	at Stanford	Stanford Stadium; Stanford, CA	L 0–7		
October 28	Arizona	Ewing Field; San Francisco, CA	W 8–7		
November 5	vs. Olympic Club	Ewing Field; San Francisco, CA	L 0–9	10,000	
November 12	Mare Island Marines	Mission Field; Santa Clara, CA	W 34–7		
November 24	at Nevada	Mackay Field; Reno, NV	T 7–7		
November 30	vs. Saint Mary's	California Field; Berkeley, CA	L 7–9	10,000	
