= 1922 Arizona Wildcats football team =

American college football season

1922 Arizona Wildcats football
- Conference: Independent
- Record: 6–3
- Head coach: Pop McKale (8th season)
- Captain: John Cole Hobbs

1922 Western college football independents records
	Conf.			Overall
Team	W	L	T	W		L		T
La Verne		–		6	–	2	–	2
New Mexico A&M		–		6	–	2	–	0
Arizona		–		6	–	3	–	0
Hawaii		–		5	–	1	–	1
Gonzaga		–		5	–	3	–	0
Nevada		–		5	–	3	–	1
Santa Clara		–		4	–	4	–	1
Cal Aggies		–		3	–	4	–	2
New Mexico		–		3	–	4	–	0
Saint Mary's		–		3	–	6	–	0
Tempe Normal		–		0	–	3	–	1

The 1922 Arizona Wildcats football team represented the University of Arizona as an independent during the 1922 college football season. In their eighth season under head coach Pop McKale, the Wildcats compiled a 6–3 record and outscored their opponents, 109 to 53. The team captain was John Cole Hobbs.

== Schedule ==
Date	Opponent	Site	Result	Attendance	Source
October 7	Phoenix Indians	Tucson, AZ	W 19–0		
October 14	at USC	Bovard Field; Los Angeles, CA	L 0–15	12,000	
October 28	at Santa Clara	Ewing Field; San Francisco, CA	L 7–8		
November 4	New Mexico A&M	Tucson, AZ	W 21–7		
November 11	Saint Mary's	Tucson, AZ	W 20–3		
November 18	New Mexico	Tucson, AZ (rivalry)	W 10–0		
November 30	at Rice	Rice Field; Houston, TX	L 7–14		
December 3	at Texas Mines	El Paso, TX	W 18–0		
December 25	vs. Utah Agricultural	Fairgrounds; Phoenix, AZ	W 7–6		
