= 1923 Utah Utes football team =

American college football season

1923 Utah Utes football
- Conference: Rocky Mountain Conference
- Record: 4–3 (2–3 RMC)
- Head coach: Thomas M. Fitzpatrick (5th season)
- Home stadium: Cummings Field

1923 Rocky Mountain Conference football standings
	Conf.					Overall
Team	W		L		T	W		L		T
Colorado $	7	–	0	–	0	9	–	0	–	0
Colorado College	6	–	1	–	1	6	–	1	–	1
Colorado Agricultural	5	–	1	–	1	5	–	2	–	1
Utah Agricultural	4	–	2	–	0	5	–	2	–	0
Denver	4	–	3	–	0	6	–	3	–	0
Utah	2	–	3	–	0	4	–	3	–	0
Montana State	1	–	2	–	0	5	–	4	–	0
Colorado Mines	1	–	5	–	0	2	–	5	–	0
BYU	1	–	5	–	0	2	–	5	–	0
Wyoming	0	–	7	–	0	0	–	8	–	0
$ – Conference champion

The 1923 Utah Utes football team was an American football team that represented the University of Utah as a member of the Rocky Mountain Conference (RMC) during the 1923 college football season. In their fifth season under head coach Thomas M. Fitzpatrick, the Utes compiled an overall of record of 4–3 with a mark of 2–3 in conference play, finished fifth in the RMC, and outscored opponents by a total of 241 to 48.

== Schedule ==
Date	Opponent	Site	Result	Attendance	Source
October 6	at Whitman*	Ankeny Field; Walla Walla, WA	W 16–0		
October 13	Wyoming	Cummings Field; Salt Lake City, UT	W 79–0		
October 27	at BYU	Provo, UT (rivalry)	W 15–0		
November 3	College of Idaho*	Cummings Field; Salt Lake City, UT	W 105–3		
November 10	at Colorado College	Washburn Field; Colorado Springs, CO	L 6–7		
November 17	Colorado^{†}	Cummings Field; Salt Lake City, UT (rivalry)	L 7–17	12,000	
November 29	Utah Agricultural	Cummings Field; Salt Lake City, UT (rivalry)	L 13–21		
*Non-conference game; ^{†}Homecoming
