= G. Ott Romney =

American football player and coach, basketball coach (1892–1973)

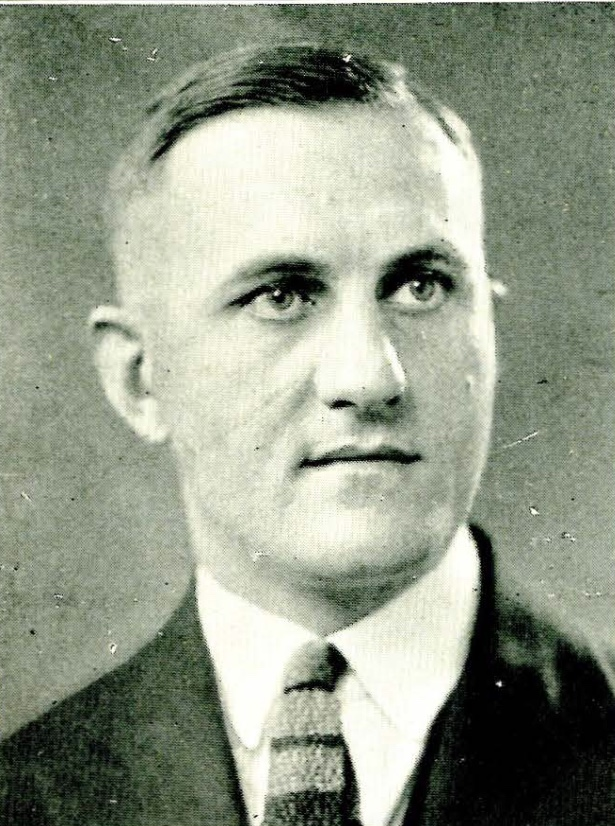
- Romney from the 1928 Montanan

Biographical details
- Born: December 12, 1892; Salt Lake City, Utah, U.S.
- Died: May 3, 1973 (aged 80); Washington, D.C., U.S.

Playing career

Football
- 1910–1912: Utah

Coaching career (HC unless noted)

Football
- 1922–1927: Montana State
- 1928–1936: BYU

Basketball
- 1922–1928: Montana State
- 1928–1935: BYU

Baseball
- 1925–1926: Montana State

Administrative career (AD unless noted)
- 1922–1928: Montana State
- 1928–1936: BYU

Head coaching record
- Overall: 72–51–8 (college football); 283–102 (college basketball)

George Ottinger "Ott" Romney (December 12, 1892 – May 3, 1973) was an American college football player, coach of football, college basketball, college baseball, and track and field, and college athletics administrator. While directing the department at Montana State Agricultural College (now Montana State University- Bozeman) he served as head coach in football, track and basketball from 1922 to 1927 and at Brigham Young University (BYU) from 1928 to 1936, compiling a career college football record of 72–51–8. Romney served as head basketball coach at Montana State Agricultural College from 1922 to 1928. The program built teams that were honored by the Helms Foundation as some of the best of the early 20th Century, pioneering the Fast Break’ offense, successfully coupled with high pressure defense. The ‘Golden Bobcats’ under his successor, Schubert Dyche, won national recognition and two players, John ‘Cat’ Thompson and Frank Ward, were named as ‘All Americans’. At BYU from 1928 to 1935, Romney amassed a career college basketball mark of 283–102. In addition, Romney coached football and track at BYU and served as the school's athletic director.

== Coaching career ==
Romney was the third head football coach at Brigham Young University (BYU). He coached for nine years, from 1928 to 1936. His overall record at BYU was 44–31–6. His best year in coaching was in 1932 when he went 8–1 and took second in the Rocky Mountain Conference.

== Honors, family, death ==
Montana State University honored Romney by naming the first gymnasium built on campus after him. Although later replaced as the main sports facility by a large multipurpose field house named for his player John "Brick" Breeden, the Romney Gymnasium, now Romney Hall, still stands on the main quad of the Bozeman campus. MSU sought funding for the Romney repurposing from the Montana Legislature for nearly a decade until, in April 2019, the Legislature approved $25 million for Romney Hall. With these funds, and an additional $7 million raised from generous donors, MSU could proceed with transforming the marginally usable building into an energy-efficient "hero" building that will be used by nearly every student to attend Montana State for generations to come.

Romney is a first cousin of former Michigan Governor George W. Romney, and his son, former Massachusetts Governor Mitt Romney is named for Ott's younger brother. G. Ott Romney was named after his maternal grandfather George M. Ottinger although, since his father was George Ernest Romney and his other grandfather was also named George Romney, it might have been more complex than this. He died of a heart ailment in 1973.

== Head coaching record ==
=== Football ===
Year	Team	Overall	Conference	Standing	Bowl/playoffs
Montana Agricultural Bobcats (Rocky Mountain Conference) (1922–1927)
1922	Montana State	4–4	0–1	10th	
1923	Montana State	5–4	1–2	7th	
1924	Montana State	5–1–1	1–1–1	T–6th	
1925	Montana State	6–5	1–4	10th	
1926	Montana State	4–2–1	4–0	2nd	
1927	Montana State	4–4	3–1	T–3rd	
Montana Agricultural:		28–20–2	10–9–1		
BYU Cougars (Rocky Mountain Conference) (1928–1936)
1928	BYU	3–3–1	1–3–1	10th	
1929	BYU	5–3	4–2	T–4th	
1930	BYU	5–2–4	4–1–1	3rd	
1931	BYU	4–4	2–3	7th	
1932	BYU	8–1	5–1	2nd	
1933	BYU	5–4	5–3	5th	
1934	BYU	4–5	3–5	7th	
1935	BYU	4–4	3–4	T–7th	
1936	BYU	4–5	4–4	6th	
BYU:		44–31–6	31–26–2		
Total:		72–51–8			
