= 1922 Colorado Silver and Gold football team =

American college football season

1922 Colorado Silver and Gold football
- Conference: Rocky Mountain Conference
- Record: 4–4 (2–3 RMC)
- Head coach: Myron E. Witham (3rd season)
- Captain: Del Jack
- Home stadium: Gamble Field

1922 Rocky Mountain Conference football standings
	Conf.					Overall
Team	W		L		T	W		L		T
Utah $	5	–	0	–	0	7	–	1	–	0
Colorado Agricultural	5	–	1	–	1	5	–	2	–	1
Denver	3	–	1	–	1	6	–	1	–	1
Colorado Mines	3	–	2	–	1	4	–	2	–	1
Utah Agricultural	3	–	3	–	0	5	–	4	–	0
Colorado College	2	–	2	–	1	3	–	3	–	1
Colorado	2	–	3	–	0	4	–	4	–	0
BYU	1	–	5	–	0	1	–	5	–	0
Wyoming	1	–	7	–	0	1	–	8	–	0
Montana State	0	–	1	–	0	4	–	4	–	0
$ – Conference champion

The 1922 Colorado Silver and Gold football team was an American football team that represented the University of Colorado as a member of the Rocky Mountain Conference (RMC) during the 1922 college football season. In its third season under head coach Myron E. Witham, the team compiled a 4–4 record (2–3 against RMC opponents), finished sixth in the conference, and outscored opponents by a total of 79 to 56.

== Schedule ==
Date	Opponent	Site	Result	Source
October 7	at Regis*	Denver, CO	W 14–0	
October 14	New Mexico*	Gamble Field; Boulder, CO	W 3–0	
October 21	Utah	Gamble Field; Boulder, CO (rivalry)	L 0–3	
October 28	at Denver	Denver, CO	L 0–16	
November 4	Colorado Agricultural^{†}	Gamble Field; Boulder, CO (rivalry)	W 7–0	
November 11	at Colorado College	Washburn Field; Colorado Springs, CO	L 10–21	
November 18	at Kansas*	Memorial Stadium; Lawrence, KS	L 6–39	
November 23	at Colorado Mines	Golden, CO	W 16–0	
*Non-conference game; ^{†}Homecoming
