= World War I Memorial Stadium =

Stadium in Manhattan, Kansas, USA

Coordinates: 39°11′15″N 96°35′03.6″W

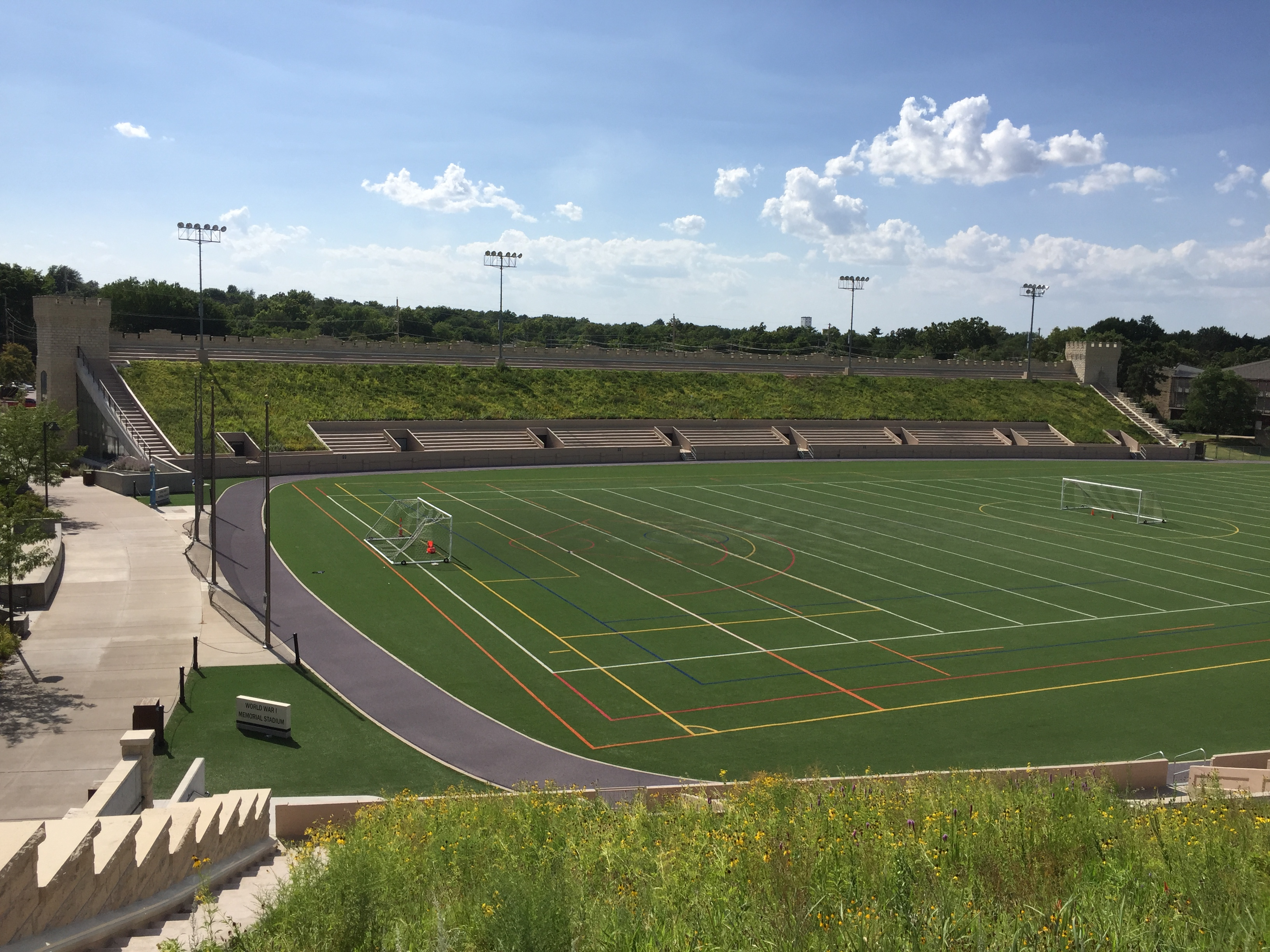
- Interactive map of World War I Memorial Stadium
- Former names: Memorial Stadium
- Location: Manhattan, Kansas
- Owner: Kansas State
- Operator: Kansas State
- Capacity: 17,500 (former)
- Surface: FieldTurf

Construction
- Opened: 1922
- Cost: US$500,000

Tenants
- Kansas State Wildcats (field lacrosse, rugby union, soccer)

World War I Memorial Stadium (previously Memorial Stadium) is a stadium in Manhattan, Kansas, United States. From its opening in 1922 until 1967 it was the home field of the Kansas State Wildcats football team, prior to the opening of Bill Snyder Family Football Stadium (known as KSU Stadium from 1968 to 2005). It was also used by Kansas State University for track and field.

== Stadium history ==
The stadium was built and named in tribute to Kansas State students who died in World War I. The west stands were built in 1922, and the stands on the east side of the stadium were completed two years later. Its general seating capacity was 17,500 people when completed, although attendance sometimes exceeded 20,000. The stadium was built at the location of Ahearn Field, and as late as 1938 the field was still known as Ahearn Field at Memorial Stadium.

The original plans for the stadium included an enclosed bowl, but the final phase of the stadium was never built.

In 2015–16, both sides of the stadium were renovated, with much of the seating bowl converted to gardens. The stadium was officially re-dedicated as "World War I Memorial Stadium" on April 21, 2017.

== Football history ==
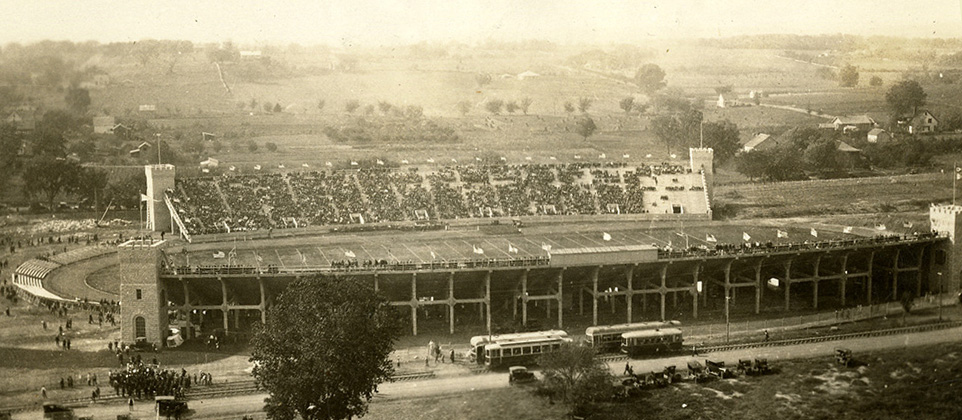
Memorial Stadium, 1924

The first game held at the stadium was on October 6, 1922, when only the west wing of the stadium was complete. Kansas State defeated Washburn University in that initial contest 47–0.

The east wing of the stadium opened for the 1924 season. Four years later in 1928, a two-story wooden press-box was added to the east wing. The upper level was for press, while the lower level featured boxes for distinguished alumni and guests.

A pre-World War II record crowd of 17,545 attended the Wildcats' game against #6 Oklahoma on November 11, 1939. Kansas State lost the game 13–10. After the war there were a handful of games where attendance exceeded 20,000, including a crowd of 23,822 to watch #18 Kansas State play #9 Oklahoma in 1953.

The first night college football game at Memorial Stadium was played on September 20, 1947. Oklahoma A&M defeated Kansas State by a score of 12–0.

Colorado defeated Kansas State 40-6 in stadium's last game November 18, 1967.

== Stadium today ==
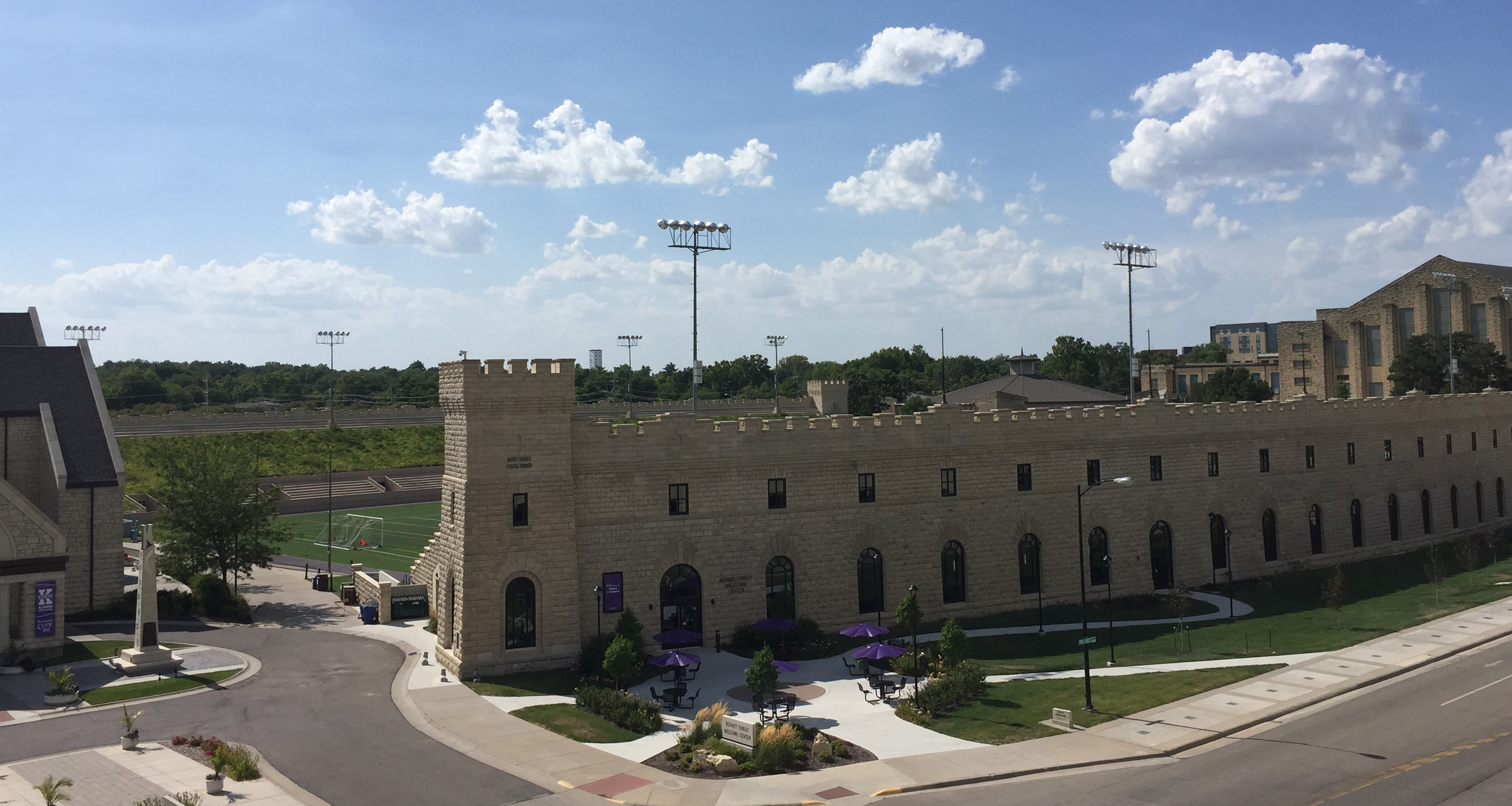
Exterior of stadium, 2017

=== Athletic events ===
The stadium is still used for athletics. In 2002 the grass field was replaced with FieldTurf and the cinder track was replaced with a rubberized surface. The playing field is now painted for use by the school's club MCLA lacrosse team, soccer team, and is also used as the home pitch for the Rugby team, as well as the marching band's practice field.

=== Other uses ===
In addition to the stadium's use for athletics, the areas underneath the stadium's seats are utilized for university offices and academic purposes. The East Stadium now houses the newly renovated Berney Family Welcome Center, while the West Stadium houses a newly built Purple Masque Theater. In 2023, the Tracz Family Band Hall was created in the North portion of the West Stadium. It is named after long time K-State Director of Bands, Frank Tracz.

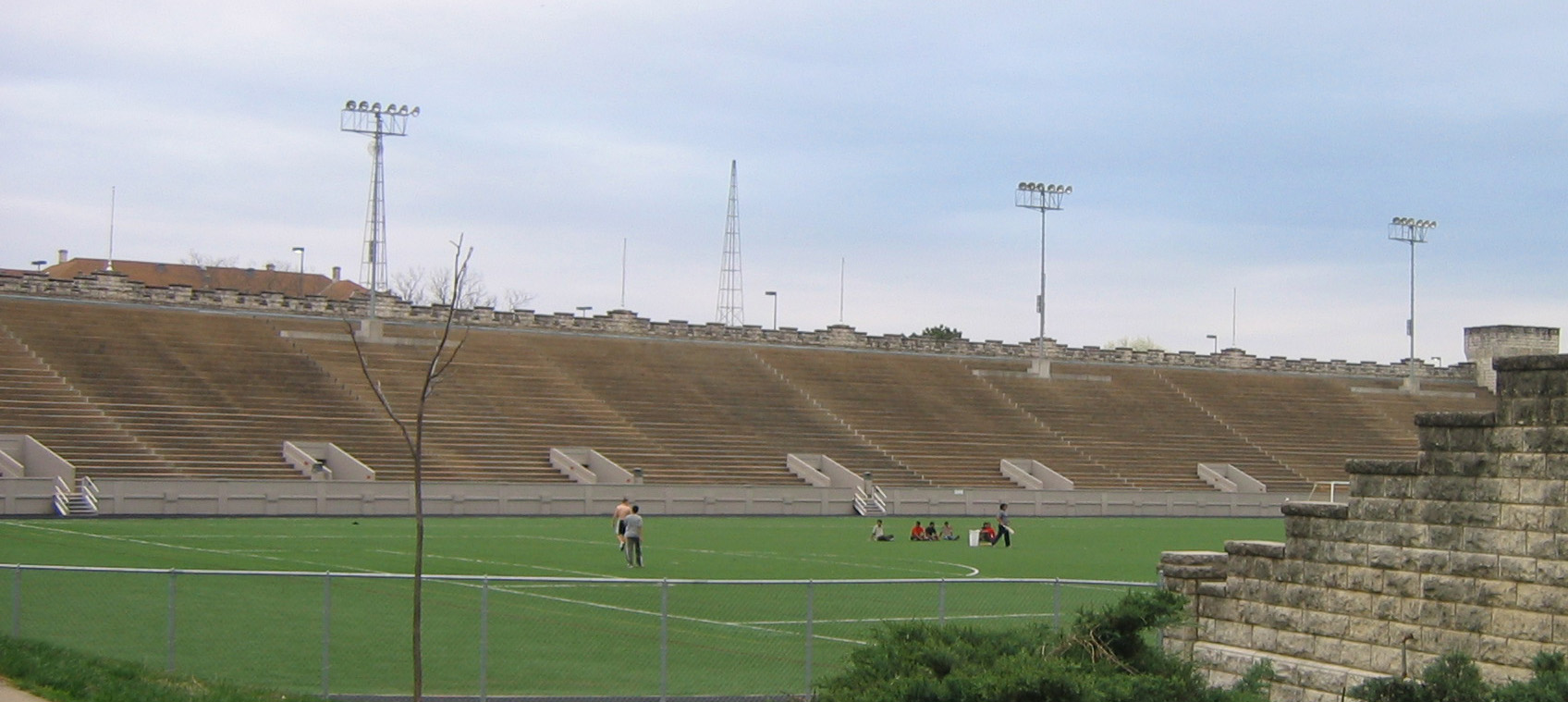
Seating bowl at stadium, prior to installation of gardens

Through the years, occasional concerts and band competitions have been held in the stadium.
