= 1923 BYU Cougars football team =

American college football season

1923 BYU Cougars football
- Conference: Rocky Mountain Conference
- Record: 2–5 (1–5 RMC)
- Head coach: Alvin Twitchell (2nd season)

1923 Rocky Mountain Conference football standings
	Conf.					Overall
Team	W		L		T	W		L		T
Colorado $	7	–	0	–	0	9	–	0	–	0
Colorado College	6	–	1	–	1	6	–	1	–	1
Colorado Agricultural	5	–	1	–	1	5	–	2	–	1
Utah Agricultural	4	–	2	–	0	5	–	2	–	0
Denver	4	–	3	–	0	6	–	3	–	0
Utah	2	–	3	–	0	4	–	3	–	0
Montana State	1	–	2	–	0	5	–	4	–	0
Colorado Mines	1	–	5	–	0	2	–	5	–	0
BYU	1	–	5	–	0	2	–	5	–	0
Wyoming	0	–	7	–	0	0	–	8	–	0
$ – Conference champion

The 1923 BYU Cougars football team was an American football team that represented Brigham Young University (BYU) as a member of the Rocky Mountain Conference (RMC) during the 1923 college football season. In their second season under head coach Alvin Twitchell, the Cougars compiled an overall record of 2–5 with a mark of 1–5 in conference, tied for seventh place in the RMC, and were outscored by a total of 156 to 47.

== Schedule ==
Date	Opponent	Site	Result	Attendance	Source
September 29	Montana State	Provo, UT	W 15–16	800	
October 13	at Colorado Agricultural	Colorado Field; Fort Collins, CO	L 6–14		
October 20	at Colorado	Gamble Field; Boulder, CO	L 0–41		
October 27	Utah	Provo, UT (rivalry)	L 0–15		
November 3	Western State (CO)*	Provo, UT	W 19–0		
November 12	at Utah Agricultural	Logan, UT (rivalry)	L 0–40		
November 29	at Colorado College	Colorado Springs, CO	L 6–31		
*Non-conference game
