= John Corbett (coach) =

American football player and sports coach (1869–1947)

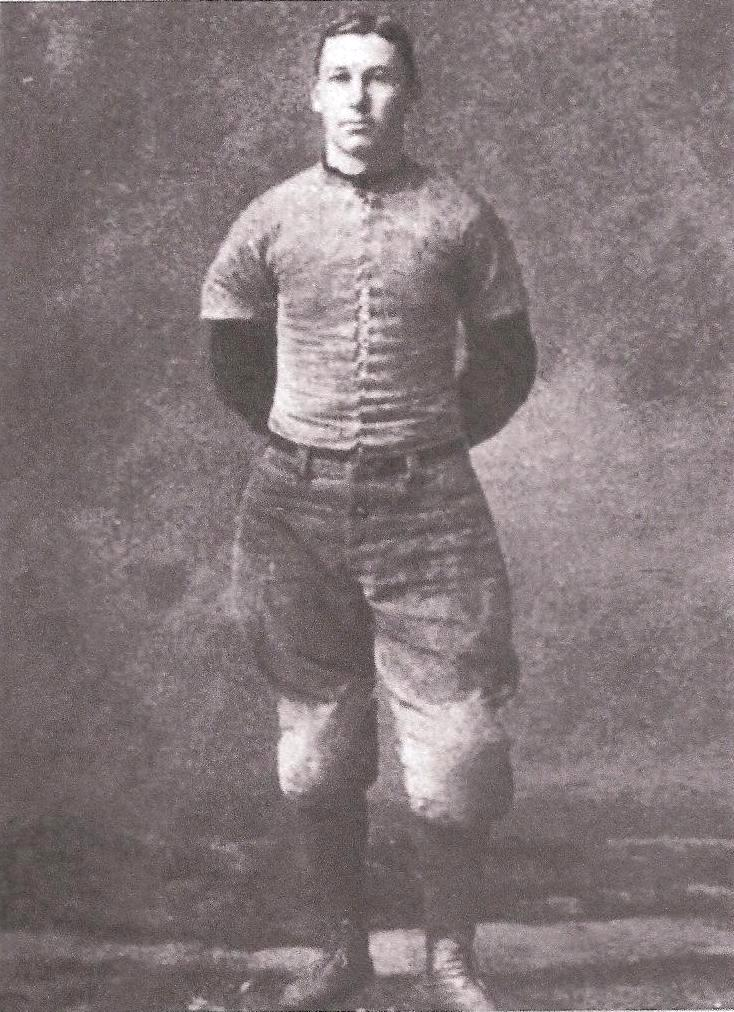
- Portrait of Corbett from Walter Camp's 1894 book, American Football

Biographical details
- Born: November 14, 1869; Boston, Massachusetts, U.S.
- Died: February 20, 1947 (aged 77); Laramie, Wyoming, U.S.

Playing career

Football
- 1890–1893: Harvard
- Position: Halfback

Coaching career (HC unless noted)

Football
- 1898: Holy Cross (interim HC)
- 1915–1923: Wyoming

Basketball
- 1910–1911: Ohio
- 1915–1924: Wyoming

Baseball
- 1909: Ohio
- 1912: Indiana

Head coaching record
- Overall: 16–44–3 (football); 40–45 (basketball); 12–12 (baseball)

Accomplishments and honors

Awards
- Consensus All-American (1890)

John Corbett (November 14, 1869 – February 20, 1947) was an American football player and coach of multiple sports. He played football for Harvard University from 1890 to 1893 and was selected as one of the two halfbacks on the 1890 All-America college football team. He graduated from Harvard in 1894 and earned a master's degree from Ohio University in 1910. Corbett went on to coach football in Ohio, Oklahoma, and Wyoming. In 1914, he moved to Wyoming where he coached all of the athletic teams, including football, basketball, baseball, and track and field, for the University of Wyoming from 1914 to 1924. He remained the university's director of physical education until his retirement in September 1939. He became known as Wyoming's "Grand Old Man of Athletics." In October 1931, the University of Wyoming's athletic field was named Corbett Field in his honor. Corbett died on February 21, 1947, of an apparent heart attack at his home in Laramie, Wyoming; he was 77 years old.

== Head coaching record ==
=== Football ===
Year	Team	Overall	Conference	Standing	Bowl/playoffs
Holy Cross Crusaders (Independent) (1898)
1898	Holy Cross	1–0			
Holy Cross:		1–0			
Wyoming Cowboys (Rocky Mountain Conference) (1915–1917)
1915	Wyoming	2–6	1–5	T–6th	
1916	Wyoming	1–4	1–4	6th	
1917	Wyoming	3–4	1–4	7th	
Wyoming Cowboys (Rocky Mountain Conference) (1919–1923)
1919	Wyoming	3–5	3–3	5th	
1920	Wyoming	4–5–1	2–5–1	7th	
1921	Wyoming	1–4–2	1–3–2	T–6th	
1922	Wyoming	1–8	1–7	9th	
1923	Wyoming	0–8	0–7	10th	
Wyoming:		15–44–3	10–38–3		
Total:		16–44–3			
