= Alvin Twitchell =

American football and basketball coach

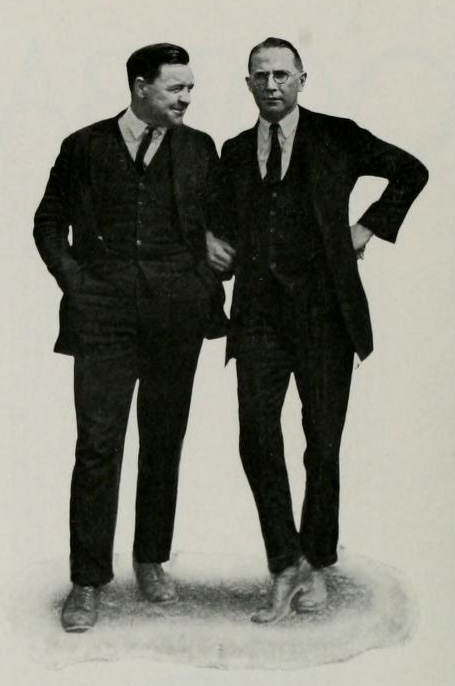
- Twitchell (left) pictured in The Banyan 1923, BYU yearbook

Biographical details
- Born: May 13, 1892; Beaver, Utah, U.S.
- Died: May 10, 1955 (aged 62); Pueblo, Colorado, U.S.

Coaching career (HC unless noted)

Football
- 1922–1924: BYU
- 1941: Pueblo Centennial HS (CO)

Basketball
- 1920–1925: BYU
- 1926–1930: Colorado College

Head coaching record
- Overall: 5–13–1 (college football); 100–51 (college basketball)

Alvin Greenwood Twitchell (May 13, 1892 – May 10, 1955) was an American football and basketball coach. He was the first head football coach at Brigham Young University (BYU), serving from 1922 to 1924 and compiling a record of 5–13–1. Twitchell was also the head basketball coach at BYU from 1920 to 1925 and at Colorado College from 1926 to 1930, amassing a career college basketball mark of 100–51.

Twitchell started his football coaching tenure at BYU in 1922 with a game against Utah Agricultural in Logan, Utah. BYU lost the game 41–3. Twitchell finished the year with a record of 1–5 with the only win coming against the Wyoming. His career record at BYU was 5–13–1.

== Head coaching record ==
=== College football ===
Year	Team	Overall	Conference	Standing	Bowl/playoffs
BYU Cougars (Rocky Mountain Conference) (1922–1924)
1922	BYU	1–5	1–5	8th	
1923	BYU	2–5	1–5	T–8th	
1924	BYU	2–3–1	1–3–1	9th	
BYU:		5–13–1	3–13–1		
Total:		5–13–1			
