= Corbett Field (Wyoming) =

Former sporting venue in America

- Location in the United States Location in Wyoming
- Address: 15th Street & E. Ivinson Avenue
- Location: University of Wyoming; Laramie, Wyoming, U.S.
- Coordinates: 41.312°N 105.578°W
- Owner: University of Wyoming
- Operator: University of Wyoming

Construction
- Opened: 1922; 104 years ago

Tenant
- Wyoming Cowboys (1922–1949)

Corbett Field was an outdoor athletic field in the western United States, located on the campus of the University of Wyoming in Laramie. It was the home field of the Wyoming Cowboys football team from 1922 through 1949.

Originally, the facility was known simply as the campus athletic grounds; it was renamed Corbett Field in 1931 in honor of John Corbett, who coached the football team from 1915 to 1923. Construction of a new grandstand at the east end of the field was authorized that same fall. The field was eventually expanded to have a seating capacity of 9,000 spectators, at an approximate elevation of 7,190 feet (2,190 m) above sea level.

Corbett Field was replaced as the football venue in 1950 with the opening of War Memorial Stadium; it continued as the home of the university's track team for several years. The grandstands were subsequently demolished; the land is now used by the university's business school and, as a parking lot located to the east of the university's student union.
