= List of Rocky Mountain Conference football standings =

This is a list of yearly Colorado Faculty Athletic Conference and Rocky Mountain Conference football standings.

== Standings ==
=== Colorado Faculty Athletic Conference (1909) ===
1909 Colorado Faculty Athletic Conference football standings
	Conf.					Overall
Team	W		L		T	W		L		T
Colorado $	3	–	0	–	0	6	–	0	–	0
Colorado College	2	–	1	–	0	5	–	2	–	0
Colorado Mines	0	–	2	–	0	3	–	3	–	0
Colorado Agricultural	0	–	2	–	0	1	–	2	–	0
$ – Conference champion

=== Rocky Mountain Conference (1910–1966) ===
1910 Rocky Mountain Conference football standings
	Conf.					Overall
Team	W		L		T	W		L		T
Colorado College +	4	–	0	–	0	7	–	0	–	0
Colorado +	3	–	0	–	0	6	–	0	–	0
Utah	2	–	2	–	0	4	–	2	–	0
Denver	2	–	2	–	0	4	–	3	–	1
Colorado Mines	1	–	4	–	0	2	–	4	–	0
Colorado Agricultural	0	–	4	–	0	0	–	5	–	0
+ – Conference co-champions

1911 Rocky Mountain Conference football standings
	Conf.					Overall
Team	W		L		T	W		L		T
Colorado $	5	–	0	–	0	6	–	0	–	0
Utah	3	–	1	–	1	5	–	1	–	1
Denver	3	–	1	–	1	5	–	2	–	1
Colorado College	3	–	2	–	0	4	–	3	–	0
Wyoming	2	–	3	–	0	4	–	3	–	1
Colorado Mines	1	–	5	–	0	2	–	5	–	0
Colorado Agricultural	0	–	5	–	0	0	–	6	–	0
$ – Conference champion

1912 Rocky Mountain Conference football standings
	Conf.					Overall
Team	W		L		T	W		L		T
Colorado Mines +	5	–	1	–	0	9	–	1	–	0
Utah +	4	–	1	–	0	5	–	1	–	1
Colorado Agricultural	3	–	2	–	0	3	–	2	–	0
Colorado	2	–	2	–	0	6	–	3	–	0
Colorado College	2	–	4	–	0	5	–	4	–	0
Denver	1	–	3	–	0	2	–	6	–	1
Wyoming	0	–	5	–	0	2	–	7	–	0
+ – Conference co-champions

1913 Rocky Mountain Conference football standings
	Conf.					Overall
Team	W		L		T	W		L		T
Colorado $	4	–	0	–	1	5	–	1	–	1
Colorado Mines	5	–	1	–	0	5	–	1	–	0
Colorado College	2	–	2	–	1	5	–	2	–	1
Colorado Agricultural $	2	–	2	–	0	3	–	2	–	0
Utah	1	–	2	–	0	2	–	4	–	1
Denver	1	–	3	–	0	2	–	5	–	0
Wyoming	0	–	5	–	0	0	–	5	–	0
$ – Conference champion

1914 Rocky Mountain Conference football standings
	Conf.					Overall
Team	W		L		T	W		L		T
Colorado Mines $	5	–	0	–	1	5	–	0	–	1
Colorado	4	–	1	–	0	5	–	1	–	0
Colorado College	3	–	1	–	1	4	–	1	–	1
Colorado Agricultural	3	–	3	–	0	3	–	4	–	0
Utah	2	–	3	–	0	3	–	3	–	0
Utah Agricultural	1	–	2	–	0	2	–	5	–	0
Denver	1	–	4	–	0	5	–	4	–	0
Wyoming	0	–	5	–	0	1	–	5	–	0
$ – Conference champion

1915 Rocky Mountain Conference football standings
	Conf.					Overall
Team	W		L		T	W		L		T
Colorado Agricultural $	7	–	0	–	0	7	–	0	–	0
Utah	4	–	2	–	0	5	–	2	–	0
Colorado Mines	4	–	2	–	0	4	–	2	–	0
Colorado College	3	–	2	–	0	6	–	2	–	0
Denver	2	–	3	–	0	4	–	3	–	0
Wyoming	1	–	5	–	0	2	–	6	–	0
Colorado	1	–	5	–	0	1	–	6	–	0
Utah Agricultural	0	–	3	–	0	3	–	4	–	0
$ – Conference champion

1916 Rocky Mountain Conference football standings
	Conf.					Overall
Team	W		L		T	W		L		T
Colorado Agricultural $	6	–	0	–	1	6	–	0	–	1
Colorado College	4	–	1	–	0	6	–	1	–	0
Denver	3	–	2	–	0	4	–	2	–	1
Utah	2	–	2	–	0	3	–	2	–	0
Colorado Mines	2	–	2	–	1	3	–	2	–	1
Wyoming	1	–	4	–	0	1	–	4	–	0
Colorado	1	–	5	–	0	1	–	5	–	1
Utah Agricultural	0	–	4	–	0	1	–	5	–	1
$ – Conference champion

1917 Rocky Mountain Conference football standings
	Conf.					Overall
Team	W		L		T	W		L		T
Denver $	6	–	0	–	0	9	–	0	–	0
Utah Agricultural	4	–	0	–	0	7	–	0	–	1
Colorado	4	–	2	–	0	6	–	2	–	0
Colorado Mines	2	–	3	–	0	5	–	3	–	0
Colorado College	2	–	3	–	0	3	–	3	–	0
Utah	2	–	3	–	0	2	–	4	–	0
Wyoming	1	–	4	–	0	3	–	4	–	0
Montana State	0	–	1	–	2	0	–	2	–	2
Colorado Agricultural	0	–	7	–	1	1	–	7	–	1
$ – Conference champion

1918 Rocky Mountain Conference football standings
	Conf.					Overall
Team	W		L		T	W		L		T
Colorado Mines $	2	–	0	–	0	4	–	0	–	0
Denver	3	–	1	–	0	3	–	2	–	0
Colorado	1	–	2	–	0	2	–	3	–	0
Colorado College	1	–	2	–	0	1	–	2	–	0
Colorado Agricultural	0	–	2	–	0	0	–	2	–	0
$ – Conference champion

1919 Rocky Mountain Conference football standings
	Conf.					Overall
Team	W		L		T	W		L		T
Colorado Agricultural $	7	–	1	–	0	7	–	1	–	0
Utah	4	–	1	–	0	5	–	2	–	0
Colorado College	3	–	1	–	1	4	–	2	–	1
Utah Agricultural	3	–	2	–	0	5	–	2	–	0
Wyoming †	3	–	3	–	0	3	–	5	–	0
Colorado	2	–	3	–	1	2	–	3	–	1
Denver	0	–	4	–	1	1	–	5	–	1
Colorado Mines	0	–	4	–	1	0	–	4	–	3
Montana State †	0	–	3	–	0	1	–	3	–	1
$ – Conference champion; † Ineligible for conference title

1920 Rocky Mountain Conference football standings
	Conf.					Overall
Team	W		L		T	W		L		T
Colorado Agricultural $	6	–	0	–	1	6	–	1	–	1
Colorado College	4	–	1	–	1	5	–	1	–	1
Colorado	3	–	1	–	2	4	–	1	–	2
Utah Agricultural	2	–	1	–	1	4	–	2	–	1
Denver	2	–	4	–	0	2	–	4	–	0
Utah	1	–	2	–	1	1	–	5	–	1
Wyoming	2	–	5	–	1	4	–	5	–	1
Colorado Mines	0	–	6	–	0	0	–	6	–	0
Montana State	0	–	0	–	1	4	–	1	–	1
$ – Conference champion

1921 Rocky Mountain Conference football standings
	Conf.					Overall
Team	W		L		T	W		L		T
Utah Agricultural $	4	–	0	–	0	7	–	1	–	0
Colorado	4	–	0	–	1	4	–	1	–	1
Utah	2	–	1	–	1	3	–	2	–	1
Denver	2	–	2	–	1	4	–	2	–	1
Colorado Agricultural	2	–	2	–	1	2	–	3	–	1
Colorado College	2	–	4	–	0	4	–	4	–	0
Wyoming	1	–	3	–	2	1	–	4	–	2
Colorado Mines	1	–	5	–	0	1	–	5	–	0
Montana State	0	–	1	–	0	2	–	4	–	0
$ – Conference champion

1922 Rocky Mountain Conference football standings
	Conf.					Overall
Team	W		L		T	W		L		T
Utah $	5	–	0	–	0	7	–	1	–	0
Colorado Agricultural	5	–	1	–	1	5	–	2	–	1
Denver	3	–	1	–	1	6	–	1	–	1
Colorado Mines	3	–	2	–	1	4	–	2	–	1
Utah Agricultural	3	–	3	–	0	5	–	4	–	0
Colorado College	2	–	2	–	1	3	–	3	–	1
Colorado	2	–	3	–	0	4	–	4	–	0
BYU	1	–	5	–	0	1	–	5	–	0
Wyoming	1	–	7	–	0	1	–	8	–	0
Montana State	0	–	1	–	0	4	–	4	–	0
$ – Conference champion

1923 Rocky Mountain Conference football standings
	Conf.					Overall
Team	W		L		T	W		L		T
Colorado $	7	–	0	–	0	9	–	0	–	0
Colorado College	6	–	1	–	1	6	–	1	–	1
Colorado Agricultural	5	–	1	–	1	5	–	2	–	1
Utah Agricultural	4	–	2	–	0	5	–	2	–	0
Denver	4	–	3	–	0	6	–	3	–	0
Utah	2	–	3	–	0	4	–	3	–	0
Montana State	1	–	2	–	0	5	–	4	–	0
Colorado Mines	1	–	5	–	0	2	–	5	–	0
BYU	1	–	5	–	0	2	–	5	–	0
Wyoming	0	–	7	–	0	0	–	8	–	0
$ – Conference champion

1924 Rocky Mountain Conference football standings
	Conf.					Overall
Team	W		L		T	W		L		T
Colorado $	5	–	0	–	1	8	–	1	–	1
Utah Agricultural	3	–	2	–	1	4	–	2	–	1
Colorado Agricultural	3	–	2	–	0	4	–	2	–	0
Denver	3	–	2	–	2	4	–	2	–	2
Colorado College	4	–	3	–	0	5	–	3	–	0
Montana State	1	–	1	–	1	5	–	1	–	1
Utah	2	–	2	–	1	3	–	4	–	1
Colorado Mines	2	–	4	–	1	4	–	4	–	1
BYU	1	–	3	–	1	2	–	3	–	1
Wyoming	1	–	6	–	0	2	–	6	–	0
$ – Conference champion

1925 Rocky Mountain Conference football standings
	Conf.					Overall
Team	W		L		T	W		L		T
Colorado Agricultural $	8	–	0	–	0	9	–	1	–	0
Utah Agricultural	5	–	1	–	0	6	–	1	–	0
Utah	5	–	1	–	0	6	–	2	–	0
Colorado	5	–	2	–	0	6	–	3	–	0
Wyoming	4	–	3	–	0	6	–	3	–	0
BYU	3	–	3	–	0	3	–	3	–	0
Colorado College	4	–	4	–	0	5	–	4	–	1
Western State (CO)	2	–	4	–	0	3	–	4	–	0
Colorado Mines	2	–	6	–	0	2	–	7	–	0
Montana State	1	–	4	–	0	6	–	5	–	0
Denver	1	–	6	–	0	1	–	6	–	0
Colorado Teachers	0	–	6	–	0	2	–	6	–	1
$ – Conference champion

1926 Rocky Mountain Conference football standings
	Conf.					Overall
Team	W		L		T	W		L		T
Utah $	5	–	0	–	0	7	–	0	–	0
Montana State	4	–	0	–	0	4	–	2	–	1
Colorado College	5	–	2	–	0	5	–	2	–	0
Colorado Agricultural	5	–	2	–	0	6	–	2	–	1
Utah Agricultural	4	–	1	–	2	5	–	1	–	2
Colorado Teachers	3	–	3	–	0	6	–	4	–	0
Denver	4	–	4	–	0	4	–	4	–	0
Wyoming	1	–	2	–	2	2	–	4	–	2
Colorado	2	–	5	–	1	3	–	5	–	1
BYU	1	–	4	–	1	1	–	5	–	1
Colorado Mines	1	–	5	–	0	1	–	6	–	0
Western State (CO)	0	–	7	–	0	0	–	8	–	0
$ – Conference champion

1927 Rocky Mountain Conference football standings
	Conf.					Overall
Team	W		L		T	W		L		T
Colorado Agricultural $	7	–	1	–	0	7	–	1	–	0
Denver	5	–	1	–	0	5	–	2	–	0
Montana State	3	–	1	–	0	4	–	4	–	0
Utah	3	–	1	–	1	3	–	3	–	1
Colorado College	5	–	2	–	0	6	–	2	–	0
Colorado	4	–	4	–	0	4	–	5	–	0
Utah Agricultural	3	–	3	–	1	3	–	4	–	1
BYU	2	–	4	–	0	2	–	4	–	1
Colorado Mines	2	–	5	–	0	2	–	5	–	0
Wyoming	1	–	4	–	0	4	–	5	–	0
Colorado Teachers	1	–	6	–	0	2	–	7	–	0
Western State (CO)	1	–	5	–	0	1	–	6	–	0
$ – Conference champion

1928 Rocky Mountain Conference football standings
	Conf.					Overall
Team	W		L		T	W		L		T
Utah $	4	–	0	–	1	5	–	0	–	2
Colorado	5	–	1	–	0	5	–	1	–	0
Colorado Agricultural	6	–	2	–	0	6	–	2	–	0
Utah Agricultural	4	–	2	–	1	5	–	3	–	1
Colorado College	5	–	3	–	0	5	–	3	–	0
Montana State	3	–	2	–	0	4	–	4	–	1
Denver	3	–	4	–	1	4	–	4	–	1
Colorado Teachers	3	–	4	–	0	4	–	4	–	0
Colorado Mines	2	–	4	–	0	2	–	5	–	0
BYU	1	–	3	–	1	3	–	3	–	1
Wyoming	0	–	5	–	0	2	–	7	–	0
Western State (CO)	0	–	6	–	0	0	–	7	–	0
$ – Conference champion

1929 Rocky Mountain Conference football standings
	Conf.					Overall
Team	W		L		T	W		L		T
Utah $	6	–	0	–	0	7	–	0	–	0
Colorado	4	–	1	–	1	5	–	1	–	1
Denver	4	–	1	–	1	5	–	1	–	1
Montana State	2	–	1	–	0	6	–	2	–	0
BYU	4	–	2	–	0	5	–	3	–	0
Colorado Teachers	3	–	2	–	0	4	–	3	–	0
Colorado College	4	–	3	–	0	4	–	3	–	0
Colorado Agricultural	4	–	4	–	0	5	–	4	–	0
Utah State	3	–	4	–	0	3	–	4	–	0
Colorado Mines	1	–	5	–	0	2	–	5	–	0
Western State (CO)	0	–	5	–	0	2	–	5	–	0
Wyoming	0	–	7	–	0	1	–	7	–	0
$ – Conference champion

1930 Rocky Mountain Conference football standings
	Conf.					Overall
Team	W		L		T	W		L		T
Utah $	7	–	0	–	0	8	–	0	–	0
Colorado	5	–	1	–	1	6	–	1	–	1
BYU	4	–	1	–	1	5	–	2	–	4
Denver	4	–	3	–	0	5	–	4	–	0
Colorado Agricultural	3	–	3	–	1	3	–	5	–	1
Montana State	1	–	1	–	0	6	–	3	–	0
Colorado Teachers	2	–	2	–	3	2	–	2	–	3
Utah State	3	–	4	–	1	3	–	5	–	1
Colorado College	2	–	4	–	2	2	–	4	–	2
Wyoming	1	–	5	–	1	2	–	5	–	1
Colorado Mines	1	–	4	–	0	1	–	5	–	0
Western State (CO)	0	–	5	–	0	0	–	6	–	0
$ – Conference champion

1931 Rocky Mountain Conference football standings
	Conf.					Overall
Team	W		L		T	W		L		T
Utah $	6	–	0	–	0	7	–	2	–	0
Utah State	5	–	2	–	0	6	–	2	–	0
Colorado Agricultural	5	–	2	–	0	5	–	4	–	0
Colorado	3	–	2	–	0	5	–	3	–	0
Wyoming	3	–	2	–	0	6	–	4	–	0
Colorado College	4	–	3	–	0	4	–	4	–	0
BYU	2	–	3	–	0	4	–	4	–	0
Denver	3	–	5	–	0	4	–	6	–	0
Colorado Teachers	2	–	4	–	1	2	–	4	–	1
Colorado Mines	0	–	4	–	1	1	–	5	–	1
Western State (CO)	1	–	5	–	0	1	–	6	–	0
Montana State	0	–	2	–	0	1	–	5	–	1
$ – Conference champion

1932 Rocky Mountain Conference football standings
	Conf.					Overall
Team	W		L		T	W		L		T
Utah $	6	–	0	–	0	6	–	1	–	1
BYU	5	–	1	–	0	8	–	1	–	0
Colorado College	5	–	2	–	0	5	–	2	–	0
Denver	4	–	1	–	1	4	–	3	–	1
Colorado Agricultural	4	–	3	–	1	4	–	3	–	1
Colorado Teachers	2	–	2	–	1	4	–	2	–	1
Utah State	3	–	3	–	0	4	–	4	–	0
Colorado	2	–	4	–	0	2	–	4	–	0
Wyoming	1	–	4	–	1	2	–	6	–	1
Colorado Mines	1	–	5	–	0	1	–	7	–	0
Montana State	0	–	3	–	0	3	–	3	–	1
Western State (CO)	0	–	5	–	0	1	–	5	–	0
$ – Conference champion

1933 Rocky Mountain Conference football standings
	Conf.					Overall
Team	W		L		T	W		L		T
Utah +	5	–	1	–	0	5	–	3	–	0
Colorado Agricultural +	5	–	1	–	1	5	–	1	–	1
Denver +	5	–	1	–	1	5	–	3	–	1
Colorado	5	–	2	–	0	7	–	2	–	0
BYU	5	–	3	–	0	5	–	4	–	0
Utah State	4	–	3	–	0	4	–	4	–	0
Colorado Teachers	3	–	3	–	0	4	–	3	–	0
Colorado College	2	–	4	–	1	2	–	5	–	1
Montana State	1	–	3	–	0	2	–	5	–	0
Colorado Mines	1	–	5	–	0	1	–	5	–	0
Wyoming	1	–	6	–	1	2	–	6	–	1
Western State (CO)	0	–	5	–	0	0	–	5	–	0
+ – Conference co-champions

1934 Rocky Mountain Conference football standings
	Conf.					Overall
Team	W		L		T	W		L		T
Colorado Teachers +	6	–	1	–	0	6	–	1	–	0
Colorado +	6	–	1	–	0	6	–	1	–	2
Colorado Agricultural +	6	–	1	–	1	6	–	2	–	1
Utah State	5	–	1	–	1	5	–	1	–	1
Utah	4	–	2	–	0	5	–	3	–	0
Denver	4	–	4	–	0	5	–	5	–	1
BYU	3	–	5	–	0	4	–	5	–	0
Wyoming	2	–	4	–	0	3	–	5	–	0
Colorado College	1	–	6	–	0	1	–	7	–	0
Colorado Mines	1	–	6	–	0	1	–	6	–	0
Western State (CO)	0	–	3	–	0	2	–	5	–	0
Montana State	0	–	4	–	0	2	–	5	–	0
+ – Conference co-champions

1935 Rocky Mountain Conference football standings
	Conf.					Overall
Team	W		L		T	W		L		T
Colorado +	5	–	1	–	0	5	–	4	–	0
Utah State +	5	–	1	–	1	5	–	2	–	1
Utah	4	–	1	–	1	4	–	3	–	1
Denver	5	–	2	–	0	6	–	3	–	0
Colorado College	4	–	2	–	1	4	–	3	–	1
Colorado State–Greeley	2	–	1	–	0	4	–	3	–	0
BYU	3	–	4	–	0	4	–	4	–	0
Wyoming	3	–	4	–	0	4	–	4	–	0
Colorado A&M	2	–	4	–	1	3	–	4	–	1
Montana State	1	–	5	–	0	2	–	6	–	1
Colorado Mines	1	–	6	–	0	1	–	6	–	0
Western State (CO)	0	–	4	–	0	1	–	6	–	0
+ – Conference co-champions

1936 Rocky Mountain Conference football standings
	Conf.					Overall
Team	W		L		T	W		L		T
Utah State $	6	–	0	–	1	7	–	0	–	1
Denver	6	–	1	–	1	7	–	1	–	1
Utah	5	–	2	–	0	6	–	3	–	0
Colorado	4	–	2	–	0	4	–	3	–	0
Colorado State–Greeley	4	–	3	–	0	5	–	4	–	0
BYU	4	–	4	–	0	4	–	5	–	0
Colorado A&M	3	–	4	–	1	4	–	4	–	1
Colorado College	3	–	4	–	0	3	–	4	–	1
Wyoming	2	–	4	–	1	2	–	5	–	1
Montana State	1	–	4	–	0	3	–	5	–	0
Western State (CO)	1	–	5	–	0	1	–	6	–	0
Colorado Mines	0	–	6	–	0	2	–	6	–	0
$ – Conference champion

1937 Rocky Mountain Conference football standings
	Conf.					Overall
Team	W		L		T	W		L		T
No. 17 Colorado $	7	–	0	–	0	8	–	1	–	0
BYU	5	–	2	–	0	6	–	3	–	0
Denver	5	–	2	–	0	6	–	3	–	0
Utah	5	–	2	–	0	5	–	3	–	0
Western State (CO)	3	–	1	–	0	5	–	3	–	0
Colorado College	3	–	3	–	0	5	–	4	–	0
Utah State	2	–	4	–	1	2	–	4	–	2
Wyoming	2	–	4	–	0	3	–	5	–	0
Colorado State–Greeley	2	–	4	–	0	2	–	6	–	0
Montana State	0	–	3	–	1	3	–	4	–	1
Colorado Mines	1	–	5	–	0	2	–	5	–	0
Colorado A&M	1	–	6	–	0	1	–	7	–	0
$ – Conference champion; Rankings from AP Poll

1938 Rocky Mountain Conference football standings
	Conf.					Overall
Team	W		L		T	W		L		T
Montana State $	1	–	0	–	1	3	–	5	–	1
Colorado Mines	2	–	1	–	0	4	–	3	–	0
Colorado State–Greeley	1	–	1	–	1	3	–	4	–	1
Colorado College	1	–	1	–	0	1	–	6	–	0
Western State (CO)	1	–	3	–	0	3	–	5	–	0
$ – Conference champion

1939 Rocky Mountain Conference football standings
	Conf.					Overall
Team	W		L		T	W		L		T
Colorado Mines $	4	–	0	–	0	8	–	0	–	0
Colorado State–Greeley	3	–	1	–	0	4	–	4	–	0
Western State (CO)	1	–	2	–	0	2	–	5	–	1
Montana State	0	–	2	–	0	2	–	7	–	0
Colorado College	0	–	3	–	0	2	–	5	–	1
$ – Conference champion

1940 Rocky Mountain Conference football standings
	Conf.					Overall
Team	W		L		T	W		L		T
Colorado College $	2	–	0	–	1	5	–	2	–	1
Colorado Mines	3	–	1	–	0	3	–	4	–	0
Montana State	2	–	1	–	0	4	–	4	–	0
Colorado State–Greeley	1	–	3	–	0	2	–	5	–	1
Western State (CO)	0	–	3	–	1	2	–	6	–	1
$ – Conference champion

1941 Rocky Mountain Conference football standings
	Conf.					Overall
Team	W		L		T	W		L		T
Colorado College $	4	–	0	–	0	6	–	2	–	0
Colorado State–Greeley	3	–	1	–	0	3	–	5	–	0
Colorado Mines	1	–	2	–	1	2	–	4	–	2
Montana State	1	–	2	–	1	1	–	4	–	2
Western State (CO)	0	–	4	–	0	0	–	7	–	0
$ – Conference champion

1946 Rocky Mountain Conference football standings
	Conf.					Overall
Team	W		L		T	W		L		T
Montana State $	2	–	0	–	1	5	–	3	–	2
Colorado State–Greeley	3	–	1	–	0	6	–	3	–	0
Western State (CO)	1	–	1	–	0	5	–	4	–	1
Colorado College	0	–	1	–	1	4	–	4	–	1
Colorado Mines	0	–	3	–	0	1	–	4	–	1
$ – Conference champion

1947 Rocky Mountain Conference football standings
	Conf.					Overall
Team	W		L		T	W		L		T
Montana State $	1	–	0	–	0	4	–	5	–	0
Colorado College	2	–	1	–	0	4	–	5	–	0
Colorado State–Greeley	2	–	1	–	1	4	–	4	–	1
Colorado Mines	1	–	2	–	0	1	–	7	–	0
Western State (CO)	0	–	2	–	1	1	–	6	–	1
$ – Conference champion

1948 Rocky Mountain Conference football standings
	Conf.					Overall
Team	W		L		T	W		L		T
Colorado State–Greeley $	3	–	0	–	0	4	–	4	–	0
Western State (CO)	2	–	1	–	0	6	–	4	–	0
Colorado College	1	–	2	–	0	2	–	7	–	1
Colorado Mines	0	–	3	–	0	3	–	6	–	0
Montana State	0	–	0	–	0	2	–	7	–	0
$ – Conference champion

1949 Rocky Mountain Conference football standings
	Conf.					Overall
Team	W		L		T	W		L		T
Colorado College $	3	–	0	–	0	6	–	3	–	0
Colorado Mines	2	–	1	–	0	4	–	4	–	1
Western State (CO)	1	–	2	–	0	5	–	3	–	0
Colorado State–Greeley	0	–	3	–	0	0	–	8	–	0
$ – Conference champion

1950 Rocky Mountain Conference football standings
	Conf.					Overall
Team	W		L		T	W		L		T
Colorado College $	5	–	0	–	0	9	–	1	–	0
Colorado State–Greeley	3	–	2	–	0	6	–	2	–	1
Idaho State	3	–	2	–	0	4	–	4	–	0
Western State (CO)	2	–	3	–	0	4	–	4	–	0
Montana State	1	–	3	–	0	1	–	8	–	0
Colorado Mines	0	–	4	–	0	3	–	6	–	0
$ – Conference champion

1951 Rocky Mountain Conference football standings
	Conf.					Overall
Team	W		L		T	W		L		T
Colorado Mines $	4	–	0	–	0	7	–	2	–	0
Colorado College	3	–	2	–	0	4	–	5	–	0
Idaho State	3	–	2	–	0	5	–	4	–	0
Colorado State–Greeley	2	–	3	–	0	4	–	3	–	0
Western State (CO)	2	–	3	–	0	3	–	5	–	0
Montana State	0	–	4	–	0	0	–	7	–	0
$ – Conference champion

1952 Rocky Mountain Conference football standings
	Conf.					Overall
Team	W		L		T	W		L		T
Idaho State $	5	–	0	–	0	8	–	0	–	0
Colorado College	4	–	1	–	0	7	–	2	–	0
Colorado State–Greeley	3	–	2	–	0	5	–	3	–	0
Colorado Mines	2	–	3	–	0	4	–	5	–	0
Montana State	1	–	4	–	0	2	–	5	–	0
Western State (CO)	0	–	5	–	0	2	–	6	–	0
$ – Conference champion

1953 Rocky Mountain Conference football standings
	Conf.					Overall
Team	W		L		T	W		L		T
Idaho State $	5	–	0	–	0	6	–	2	–	0
Montana State	4	–	1	–	0	4	–	4	–	0
Western State (CO)	2	–	2	–	1	5	–	2	–	1
Colorado College	1	–	2	–	2	2	–	4	–	2
Colorado Mines	1	–	3	–	1	3	–	4	–	1
Colorado State–Greeley	0	–	5	–	0	2	–	5	–	0
$ – Conference champion

1954 Rocky Mountain Conference football standings
	Conf.					Overall
Team	W		L		T	W		L		T
Montana State $	6	–	0	–	0	8	–	1	–	0
Western State (CO)	7	–	1	–	0	9	–	1	–	0
Idaho State	3	–	3	–	0	4	–	4	–	0
Colorado Mines	4	–	4	–	0	4	–	5	–	0
Colorado State–Greeley	1	–	6	–	1	1	–	7	–	1
Colorado College	0	–	7	–	1	1	–	8	–	1
$ – Conference champion

1955 Rocky Mountain Conference football standings
	Conf.					Overall
Team	W		L		T	W		L		T
Idaho State $	6	–	0	–	0	8	–	1	–	0
Western State (CO)	6	–	2	–	0	7	–	3	–	0
Montana State	3	–	2	–	1	4	–	4	–	1
Colorado Mines	2	–	4	–	2	2	–	5	–	2
Colorado College	2	–	6	–	0	3	–	7	–	0
Colorado State–Greeley	1	–	6	–	1	1	–	7	–	1
$ – Conference champion

1956 Rocky Mountain Conference football standings
	Conf.					Overall
Team	W		L		T	W		L		T
Montana State $^	5	–	0	–	0	9	–	0	–	1
Idaho State	3	–	2	–	0	6	–	3	–	0
Colorado State–Greeley	3	–	2	–	0	5	–	4	–	0
Western State (CO)	3	–	2	–	0	5	–	5	–	0
Colorado College	1	–	4	–	0	2	–	7	–	0
Colorado Mines	0	–	5	–	0	2	–	7	–	0
$ – Conference champion; ^ – NAIA playoff participant

1957 Rocky Mountain Conference football standings
	Conf.					Overall
Team	W		L		T	W		L		T
Idaho State $	5	–	0	–	0	9	–	0	–	0
Western State (CO)	3	–	1	–	1	5	–	4	–	1
Colorado State–Greeley	3	–	2	–	0	6	–	3	–	0
Colorado College	2	–	3	–	0	3	–	5	–	0
Colorado Mines	0	–	3	–	2	0	–	6	–	3
Adams State	0	–	4	–	1	0	–	9	–	1
$ – Conference champion

1958 Rocky Mountain Conference football standings
	Conf.					Overall
Team	W		L		T	W		L		T
Colorado Mines +	4	–	1	–	0	7	–	3	–	0
Colorado College +	4	–	1	–	0	6	–	3	–	0
Idaho State	3	–	2	–	0	4	–	5	–	0
Colorado State–Greeley	3	–	2	–	0	5	–	3	–	1
Adams State	1	–	4	–	0	1	–	8	–	0
Western State (CO)	0	–	5	–	0	1	–	8	–	0
+ – Conference co-champions

1959 Rocky Mountain Conference football standings
	Conf.					Overall
Team	W		L		T	W		L		T
Idaho State $	3	–	0	–	0	6	–	2	–	0
Adams State	3	–	1	–	0	8	–	1	–	0
Colorado State–Greeley	3	–	2	–	0	7	–	2	–	0
Colorado College	2	–	3	–	0	4	–	4	–	0
Colorado Mines	1	–	3	–	0	4	–	6	–	0
Western State (CO)	1	–	4	–	0	3	–	5	–	0
$ – Conference champion

1960 Rocky Mountain Conference football standings
	Conf.					Overall
Team	W		L		T	W		L		T
No. 16 Adams State $	4	–	0	–	0	7	–	0	–	1
Idaho State	3	–	1	–	0	6	–	2	–	0
Colorado Mines	3	–	2	–	0	6	–	3	–	0
Colorado State–Greeley	2	–	2	–	1	6	–	3	–	1
Colorado College	1	–	4	–	0	4	–	5	–	0
Western State (CO)	0	–	4	–	1	1	–	7	–	1
$ – Conference champion; Rankings from NAIA poll

1961 Rocky Mountain Conference football standings
	Conf.					Overall
Team	W		L		T	W		L		T
Adams State $	4	–	0	–	0	8	–	2	–	0
Colorado College	2	–	2	–	0	5	–	3	–	1
Western State (CO)	2	–	2	–	0	4	–	5	–	0
Colorado Mines	2	–	2	–	0	3	–	6	–	0
Colorado State–Greeley	0	–	4	–	0	1	–	9	–	0
$ – Conference champion

1962 Rocky Mountain Conference football standings
	Conf.					Overall
Team	W		L		T	W		L		T
Adams State $	4	–	0	–	0	9	–	1	–	0
Western State (CO)	2	–	2	–	0	5	–	4	–	0
Colorado State–Greeley	2	–	2	–	0	3	–	6	–	0
Colorado Mines	1	–	3	–	0	4	–	5	–	0
Colorado College	0	–	4	–	0	1	–	7	–	1
$ – Conference champion

1963 Rocky Mountain Conference football standings
	Conf.					Overall
Team	W		L		T	W		L		T
Western State (CO) $	4	–	0	–	0	8	–	1	–	0
Adams State	3	–	1	–	0	6	–	4	–	0
Colorado State–Greeley	2	–	2	–	0	4	–	5	–	0
Colorado Mines	1	–	3	–	0	6	–	3	–	0
Colorado College	0	–	4	–	0	4	–	6	–	0
$ – Conference champion

1964 Rocky Mountain Conference football standings
	Conf.					Overall
Team	W		L		T	W		L		T
Western State (CO) $	3	–	0	–	0	9	–	1	–	0
Adams State	2	–	1	–	0	6	–	3	–	0
Colorado State–Greeley	1	–	2	–	0	4	–	5	–	0
Colorado Mines	0	–	3	–	0	0	–	9	–	0
$ – Conference champion

1965 Rocky Mountain Conference football standings
	Conf.					Overall
Team	W		L		T	W		L		T
Western State (CO) $	3	–	0	–	0	7	–	1	–	0
Colorado State–Greeley	2	–	1	–	0	4	–	4	–	2
Adams State	1	–	2	–	0	5	–	4	–	0
Colorado Mines	0	–	3	–	0	4	–	5	–	0
$ – Conference champion
