= Bill Saunders =

American football player and coach (1898–1950)

Biographical details
- Born: June 20, 1898; Memphis, Tennessee, U.S.
- Died: March 13, 1950 (aged 51); Grenada, Mississippi, U.S.

Playing career
- 1917–1918: Navy
- Position: Lineman

Coaching career (HC unless noted)
- 1923–1927: Colorado Agricultural (line)
- 1928–1931: Colorado State Teachers
- 1932–1934: Colorado
- 1936–1938: Denver

Head coaching record
- Overall: 44–28–8

Accomplishments and honors

Championships
- 1 RMC (1934)

William Hardin "Navy Bill" Saunders (June 20, 1898 – March 13, 1950) was an American college football player and coach. He served as the head football coach at Colorado State Teachers College—now the University of Northern Colorado—from 1928 to 1931, at the University of Colorado at Boulder from 1932 to 1934, and at the University of Denver from 1936 to 1938, compiling a career college football record of 44–28–8. Saunders played football as a lineman at the United States Naval Academy and was later a line coach at the Agricultural College of Colorado, now Colorado State University. He died on March 13, 1950, at his plantation home in Grenada, Mississippi.

== Head coaching record ==
Year	Team	Overall	Conference	Standing
Colorado State Teachers (Rocky Mountain Conference) (1928–1931)
1928	Colorado State Teachers	4–4	3–4	8th
1929	Colorado State Teachers	4–3	3–2	6th
1930	Colorado State Teachers	2–2–3	2–2–3	T–5th
1931	Colorado State Teachers	2–4–1	2–4–1	9th
Colorado State Teachers:		12–13–4	10–12–1	
Colorado Silver and Gold / Buffaloes (Rocky Mountain Conference) (1932–1934)
1932	Colorado	2–4	2–4	8th
1933	Colorado	7–2	5–2	4th
1934	Colorado	6–1–2	6–1	T–1st
Colorado:		15–7–2	13–7	
Denver Pioneers (Rocky Mountain Conference) (1936–1937)
1936	Denver	7–1–1	6–1–1	2nd
1937	Denver	6–3	5–2	T–3rd
Denver Pioneers (Mountain States Conference) (1938)
1938	Denver	4–4–1	3–2–1	T–2nd
Denver:		17–8–2	15–5–2	
Total:		44–28–8		
