= Percy Locey =

American football player, coach, and administrator (1894–1981)

- Locey in 1923

Biographical details
- Born: November 28, 1894; Ironside, Oregon, U.S.
- Died: August 12, 1981; Corvallis, Oregon, U.S.

Playing career
- 1915: Oregon State
- 1921–1923: Oregon State
- Position: Tackle

Coaching career (HC unless noted)
- 1928–1931: Olympic Club
- 1932–1935: Denver

Administrative career (AD unless noted)
- 1937–1947: Oregon State

Head coaching record
- Overall: 20–14–3 (college)

Accomplishments and honors

Championships
- 1 RMC (1933)

Awards
- First-team All-PCC (1922)

Percy P. Locey (November 28, 1894 – August 12, 1981) was an American football player, coach, and a college athletics administrator. He served as the head football coach at the University of Denver from 1932 to 1935. He moved on to become the athletic director his alma mater, Oregon State College, from 1937 to 1947.

Locey was inducted into the Oregon Sports Hall of Fame in 1981 and into the Oregon State University Sports Hall of Fame in 1990.

== Biography ==
=== Playing career ===
Locey enrolled at Oregon State in 1915 and played competitive football as a freshman, earning an athletic letter. His career and education, however, was put on hold for a short period during World War I.

Returning to Oregon State in 1921, he became an outstanding tackle on the Oregon State Aggies football team. He was elected as team captain in 1922.

Locey was chosen to play in the 1925 East–West Shrine Game for his on-field achievements. He also served as student body president his senior year at Oregon State (1923–24).

In 1926, Locey played football at the Olympic Club in San Francisco. He was a member of the Olympic's "Winged-O" football eleven that handed the University of California's "Wonder Team" their first loss in five seasons.

=== Coaching career ===
In 1928, Locey took over as the head football coach at the Olympic Club in San Francisco. In his first year at the helm, his team posted an undefeated season, with wins over Pacific coast collegiate powers Stanford and California. After the success of that season, Locey was promoted to head coach of all sports at the athletic club. He was named the coach of the West team in the annual East-West Shrine game in 1929, though his team was defeated that year, 19–7.

His next head coaching position was at the University of Denver, where he spent four seasons coaching in Denver and posted an overall record of 20–14–3, never having a losing season.

=== Athletic director ===
In 1937, Locey returned to Corvallis to become the athletic director at his alma mater. His most significant achievement as athletic director may have occurred shortly after the Beavers won the Pacific Coast Conference title in 1941, earning the right to play in the 1942 Rose Bowl against Duke. As Beaver fans hurried to buy tickets to the game in Pasadena, the attack on Pearl Harbor by Japan on December 7 soon put the game's future in doubt.

When the California venue was deemed a potential military target, forcing cancellation of the game, Locey and Oregon State were left to scramble to find an alternative site. Locey chose Duke's home campus in Durham, North Carolina, and then oversaw the refund and reissue of game and train tickets as well as hotel reservations for the Beaver faithful. Despite being 3-to-1 underdogs, the Beavers upset Duke, 20–16, in what remains the Beavers' only Rose Bowl victory.

Locey stepped down as athletic director at Oregon State College in 1947.

=== Legacy ===
The popular Locey was elected student body president at OAC for 1924.

Locey was named to the Oregon Sports Hall of Fame in 1981 and the Oregon State University Athletics Hall of Fame in 1990, both for his football prowess. Locey died in Corvallis on August 12, 1981.

His grandson, Jay Locey, played football at Oregon State in the 1970s and served as assistant head coach for the team from 2006 to 2014.

== Head coaching record ==
=== College ===
Year	Team	Overall	Conference	Standing
Denver Pioneers (Rocky Mountain Conference) (1932–1935)
1932	Denver	4–3–1	4–1–1	3rd
1933	Denver	5–3–1	5–1–1	T–1st
1934	Denver	5–5–1	4–4	6th
1935	Denver	6–3	5–2	4th
Denver:		20–14–3	18–8–2	
Total:		20–14–3		
National championship Conference title Conference division title or championship game berth
