= 1930 Colorado Mines Orediggers football team =

American college football season

1930 Colorado Mines Orediggers football
- Conference: Rocky Mountain Conference
- Record: 1–5 (1–4 RMC)
- Head coach: George H. Allen (4th season)
- Home stadium: Brooks Field

1930 Rocky Mountain Conference football standings
	Conf.					Overall
Team	W		L		T	W		L		T
Utah $	7	–	0	–	0	8	–	0	–	0
Colorado	5	–	1	–	1	6	–	1	–	1
BYU	4	–	1	–	1	5	–	2	–	4
Denver	4	–	3	–	0	5	–	4	–	0
Colorado Agricultural	3	–	3	–	1	3	–	5	–	1
Montana State	1	–	1	–	0	6	–	3	–	0
Colorado Teachers	2	–	2	–	3	2	–	2	–	3
Utah State	3	–	4	–	1	3	–	5	–	1
Colorado College	2	–	4	–	2	2	–	4	–	2
Wyoming	1	–	5	–	1	2	–	5	–	1
Colorado Mines	1	–	4	–	0	1	–	5	–	0
Western State (CO)	0	–	5	–	0	0	–	6	–	0
$ – Conference champion

The 1930 Colorado Mines Orediggers football team was an American football team that represented Colorado School of Mines during the 1930 college football season as a member of the Rocky Mountain Conference. In their fourth year under head coach George H. Allen, the team compiled a 1–5 record.

== Schedule ==
Date	Opponent	Site	Result	Source
October 4	at Denver	DU Stadium; Denver, CO	L 0–16	
October 18	at Colorado	Colorado Stadium; Boulder, CO	L 7–36	
October 25	Colorado Teachers	Brooks Field; Golden, CO	L 0–7	
November 1	Western State (CO)	Brooks Field; Golden, CO	W 13–0	
November 11	at Regis*	Denver, CO	L 9–13	
November 27	vs. Colorado College	Centennial Athletic Field; Pueblo, CO	L 6–7	
*Non-conference game
