= Pete Pederson =

American basketball player and coach

Biographical details
- Born: October 28, 1910; Pueblo, Colorado, U.S.
- Died: September 8, 1982 (aged 71); Avila Beach, California, U.S.

Playing career

Football
- 1931–1933: Western State (CO)

Basketball
- 1931–1934: Western State (CO)
- 1939–1940: Oshkosh All-Stars
- 1941–1942: Toledo Jim White Chevrolets
- Position: Center (basketball)

Coaching career (HC unless noted)

Football
- 1942–1949: Mount Union
- 1950–1952: Marshall
- 1953–1960: Western State (CO)

Basketball
- 1935–1939: Western State (CO)
- 1945–1950: Mount Union
- 1958–1961: Western State (CO)

Head coaching record
- Overall: 68–73–7 (college football); 113–108 (college basketball)

Willard Merrill "Pete" Pederson (October 28, 1910 – September 8, 1982) was an American college football and college basketball coach as well as a professional basketball player. Professionally, he played in the National Basketball League for the Oshkosh All-Stars and Toledo Jim White Chevrolets and averaged 3.1 points per game for his career. In 1939–40 he served as player-coach for the All-Stars before resuming full-time head coaching duties in 1940–41. His collegiate basketball coaching experience includes a stint at his alma mater, Western State College of Colorado—now known as Western Colorado University, from 1935 to 1939.

Pederson played football at Western State in addition to basketball. In his post-professional basketball life, he became the head football coach for University of Mount Union, Marshall University, and Western State.

== Head coaching record ==
=== College football ===
Year	Team	Overall	Conference	Standing	Bowl/playoffs
Mount Union Purple Raiders (Ohio Athletic Conference) (1942–1949)
1942	Mount Union	1–6	0–5	15th	
1943	No team—World War II				
1944	No team—World War II				
1945	No team—World War II				
1946	Mount Union	7–1–1	5–1–1	6th	
1947	Mount Union	5–4	3–4	13th	
1948	Mount Union	6–3	6–2	6th	
1949	Mount Union	3–6	2–3	T–7th	
Mount Union:		22–20–1	16–15–1		
Marshall Thundering Herd (Ohio Valley Conference) (1950–1951)
1950	Marshall	2–8	2–4	5th	
1951	Marshall	5–4–1	4–2	T–2nd	
Marshall Thundering Herd (Independent) (1952)
1952	Marshall	2–7–2			
Marshall:		9–19–3	6–6		
Western State Mountaineers (Rocky Mountain Conference) (1953–1960)
1953	Western State	5–2–1	2–2–1	3rd	
1954	Western State	9–1	7–1	2nd	
1955	Western State	7–3	6–2	2nd	
1956	Western State	5–5	3–2	T–2nd	
1957	Western State	5–4–1	3–1–1	2nd	
1958	Western State	1–8	0–5	6th	
1959	Western State	3–5	1–4	6th	
1960	Western State	1–7–1	0–4–1	6th	
Western State:		37–33–3	23–20–3		
Total:		68–73–7			
