= 1930 Colorado Teachers Bears football team =

American college football season

1930 Colorado Teachers Bears football
- Conference: Rocky Mountain Conference
- Record: 2–2–3 (2–2–3 RMC)
- Head coach: Bill Saunders (3rd season)
- Home stadium: Jackson Field

1930 Rocky Mountain Conference football standings
	Conf.					Overall
Team	W		L		T	W		L		T
Utah $	7	–	0	–	0	8	–	0	–	0
Colorado	5	–	1	–	1	6	–	1	–	1
BYU	4	–	1	–	1	5	–	2	–	4
Denver	4	–	3	–	0	5	–	4	–	0
Colorado Agricultural	3	–	3	–	1	3	–	5	–	1
Montana State	1	–	1	–	0	6	–	3	–	0
Colorado Teachers	2	–	2	–	3	2	–	2	–	3
Utah State	3	–	4	–	1	3	–	5	–	1
Colorado College	2	–	4	–	2	2	–	4	–	2
Wyoming	1	–	5	–	1	2	–	5	–	1
Colorado Mines	1	–	4	–	0	1	–	5	–	0
Western State (CO)	0	–	5	–	0	0	–	6	–	0
$ – Conference champion

The 1930 Colorado Teachers Bears football team was an American football team that represented the Colorado State Teachers College (later renamed University of Northern Colorado) in the Rocky Mountain Conference (RMC) during the 1930 college football season. The team was led by third year head coach Bill Saunders and played its home games in Greeley, Colorado. The Bears finished with an overall and conference record of 2–2–3, good for sixth place in the conference.

== Schedule ==
Date	Opponent	Site	Result	Source
October 4	Western State (CO)	Jackson Field; Greeley, CO	W 14–0	
October 11	BYU	Jackson Field; Greeley, CO	T 7–7	
October 18	Colorado Agricultural	Jackson Field; Greeley, CO	L 0–26	
October 25	at Colorado Mines	Brooks Stadium; Golden, CO	W 7–0	
November 1	at Wyoming	Corbett Field; Laramie, WY	T 6–6	
November 8	Colorado	Jackson Field; Greeley, CO	L 7–27	
November 15	at Colorado College	Washburn Field; Colorado Springs, CO	T 7–7	
