= 1933 Colorado Agricultural Aggies football team =

American college football season

1933 Colorado Agricultural Aggies football

RMC co-champion
- Conference: Rocky Mountain Conference
- Record: 5–1–1 (5–1–1 RMC)
- Head coach: Harry W. Hughes (23rd season)
- Home stadium: Colorado Field

1933 Rocky Mountain Conference football standings
	Conf.					Overall
Team	W		L		T	W		L		T
Colorado Agricultural +	5	–	1	–	1	5	–	1	–	1
Utah +	5	–	1	–	0	5	–	3	–	0
Denver +	5	–	1	–	1	5	–	3	–	1
Colorado	5	–	2	–	0	7	–	2	–	0
BYU	5	–	3	–	0	5	–	4	–	0
Utah State	4	–	3	–	0	4	–	4	–	0
Colorado Teachers	3	–	3	–	0	4	–	3	–	0
Colorado College	2	–	4	–	1	2	–	5	–	1
Montana State	1	–	3	–	0	2	–	5	–	0
Colorado Mines	1	–	5	–	0	1	–	5	–	0
Wyoming	1	–	6	–	1	2	–	6	–	1
Western State (CO)	0	–	5	–	0	0	–	5	–	0
+ – Conference co-champions

The 1933 Colorado Agricultural Aggies football team represented Colorado Agricultural College (now known as Colorado State University) in the Rocky Mountain Conference (RMC) during the 1933 college football season. In their 23rd season under head coach Harry W. Hughes, the Aggies compiled a 5–1–1 record, tied for the RMC championship, and outscored all opponents by a total of 78 to 26.

Four Colorado Agricultural players received all-conference honors in 1933: end Glenn Morris, halfback Wilbur (Red) White, halfback Ralph Maag, and quarterback Bud Dammann.

== Schedule ==
Date	Opponent	Site	Result	Source
September 30	at Wyoming	Corbett Field; Laramie, WY (rivalry)	W 7–0	
October 6	at Denver	Denver University Stadium; Denver, CO	T 0–0	
October 21	Colorado	Colorado Field; Fort Collins, CO (rivalry)	W 19–6	
November 4	at Colorado Mines	Brooks Field; Golden, CO	W 19–0	
November 11	Utah State^{†}	Colorado Field; Fort Collins, CO	W 3–0	
November 25	vs. Colorado College	Denver University Stadium; Denver, CO	W 30–7	
November 30	at Utah	Ute Stadium; Salt Lake City, UT	L 0–13	
^{†}Homecoming
