= 1930 Western State Mountaineers football team =

American college football season

1930 Western State Mountaineers football
- Conference: Rocky Mountain Conference
- Record: 0–6 (0–5 RMC)
- Head coach: Telfer L. Mead (1st season)

1930 Rocky Mountain Conference football standings
	Conf.					Overall
Team	W		L		T	W		L		T
Utah $	7	–	0	–	0	8	–	0	–	0
Colorado	5	–	1	–	1	6	–	1	–	1
BYU	4	–	1	–	1	5	–	2	–	4
Denver	4	–	3	–	0	5	–	4	–	0
Colorado Agricultural	3	–	3	–	1	3	–	5	–	1
Montana State	1	–	1	–	0	6	–	3	–	0
Colorado Teachers	2	–	2	–	3	2	–	2	–	3
Utah State	3	–	4	–	1	3	–	5	–	1
Colorado College	2	–	4	–	2	2	–	4	–	2
Wyoming	1	–	5	–	1	2	–	5	–	1
Colorado Mines	1	–	4	–	0	1	–	5	–	0
Western State (CO)	0	–	5	–	0	0	–	6	–	0
$ – Conference champion

The 1930 Western State Mountaineers football team was an American football team that represented Western State College of Colorado (now known as Western Colorado University) during the 1930 college football season as a member of the Rocky Mountain Conference (RMC). In its first year under head coach Telfer L. Mead, the team compiled a 0–6 record.

== Schedule ==
Date	Opponent	Site	Result	Source
September 27	at Utah State	Aggie Stadium; Logan, UT	L 0–31	
October 4	at Colorado Teachers	Jackson Field; Greeley, CO	L 0–14	
October 11	at Colorado College	Washburn Field; Colorado Springs, CO	L 7–45	
October 25	BYU	Gunnison, CO	L 0–25	
November 15	Regis*	Gunnison, CO	L 7–14	
November 1	at Colorado Mines	Brooks Field; Golden, CO	L 0–13	
*Non-conference game
