= Denver Pioneers football, 1930–1939 =

American college football season

1930–1939 Denver Pioneers football
- Conference: Rocky Mountain Conference (1930–1937), Mountain States Conference (1938–1939),
- Head coach: Jeff Cravath (1929–1931), Percy Locey (1932–1935), Bill Saunders (1936–1938), Cac Hubbard (1939–1941)

The Denver Ministers football program, 1930–1939 represented the University of Denver in college football during the 1930s as a member of the Rocky Mountain Conference. The program was led by four head coaches during the decade: Jeff Cravath (1929–1931), Percy Locey (1932–1935), Bill Saunders (1936–1938), and Cac Hubbard (1939–1941).

Highlights of the decade included:

- The 1933 team compiled a 5–3–1 record (5–1–1 against conference opponents), shared the RMC title with Colorado Agricultural and Utah, and outscored opponents by a total of 107 to 46.
- The 1935 team compiled a 6–3 record (5–2 against conference opponents) and outscored opponents by a total of 109 to 101.
- The 1936 team compiled a 7–1–1 record (6–1–1 against conference opponents), finished second in the RMC, and outscored opponents by a total of 141 to 88.
- The 1937 compiled a 6–3 record (5–2 against conference opponents), tied for third in the RMC, and outscored opponents by a total of 122 to 61.

== 1930 ==
1930 Denver Pioneers football
- Conference: Rocky Mountain Conference
- Record: 5–4 (4–3 RMC)
- Head coach: Jeff Cravath (2nd season)
- Home stadium: Denver University Stadium

1930 Rocky Mountain Conference football standings
	Conf.					Overall
Team	W		L		T	W		L		T
Utah $	7	–	0	–	0	8	–	0	–	0
Colorado	5	–	1	–	1	6	–	1	–	1
BYU	4	–	1	–	1	5	–	2	–	4
Denver	4	–	3	–	0	5	–	4	–	0
Colorado Agricultural	3	–	3	–	1	3	–	5	–	1
Montana State	1	–	1	–	0	6	–	3	–	0
Colorado Teachers	2	–	2	–	3	2	–	2	–	3
Utah State	3	–	4	–	1	3	–	5	–	1
Colorado College	2	–	4	–	2	2	–	4	–	2
Wyoming	1	–	5	–	1	2	–	5	–	1
Colorado Mines	1	–	4	–	0	1	–	5	–	0
Western State (CO)	0	–	5	–	0	0	–	6	–	0
$ – Conference champion

The 1930 Denver Pioneers football team represented the University of Denver as a member of the Rocky Mountain Conference (RMC) during the 1930 college football season. In their second season under head coach Jeff Cravath, the Pioneers compiled a 5–4 record (4–3 against conference opponents), finished fourth in the RMC, and were outscored by a total of 148 to 140.

=== Schedule ===
Date	Opponent	Site	Result	Attendance	Source
September 20	Regis*	Denver University Stadium; Denver, CO	W 40–0	16,500	
October 4	Colorado Mines	Denver University Stadium; Denver, CO	W 16–0		
October 11	Colorado Agricultural	Denver University Stadium; Denver, CO	L 7–15		
October 18	Colorado College	Denver University Stadium; Denver, CO	W 6–0		
October 25	at Utah	Ute Stadium; Salt Lake City, UT	L 0–59	7,000	
November 1	at USC*	Los Angeles Memorial Coliseum; Los Angeles, CA	L 13–33	18,000	
November 8	Utah State	Denver University Stadium; Denver, CO	W 32–7		
November 15	Wyoming	Denver University Stadium; Denver, CO	W 19–7		
November 27	Colorado	Denver University Stadium; Denver, CO	L 7–27	25,000	
*Non-conference game

== 1931 ==
1931 Denver Pioneers football
- Conference: Rocky Mountain Conference
- Record: 4–6 (3–5 RMC)
- Head coach: Jeff Cravath (3rd season)
- Home stadium: Denver University Stadium

1931 Rocky Mountain Conference football standings
	Conf.					Overall
Team	W		L		T	W		L		T
Utah $	6	–	0	–	0	7	–	2	–	0
Utah State	5	–	2	–	0	6	–	2	–	0
Colorado Agricultural	5	–	2	–	0	5	–	4	–	0
Colorado	3	–	2	–	0	5	–	3	–	0
Wyoming	3	–	2	–	0	6	–	4	–	0
Colorado College	4	–	3	–	0	4	–	4	–	0
BYU	2	–	3	–	0	4	–	4	–	0
Denver	3	–	5	–	0	4	–	6	–	0
Colorado Teachers	2	–	4	–	1	2	–	4	–	1
Colorado Mines	0	–	4	–	1	1	–	5	–	1
Western State (CO)	1	–	5	–	0	1	–	6	–	0
Montana State	0	–	2	–	0	1	–	5	–	1
$ – Conference champion

The 1931 Denver Pioneers football team represented the University of Denver as a member of the Rocky Mountain Conference (RMC) during the 1931 college football season. In their third and final season under head coach Jeff Cravath, the Pioneers compiled a 4–6 record (3–5 against conference opponents), finished eighth in the RMC, and were outscored by a total of 143 to 104.

=== Schedule ===
Date	Opponent	Site	Result	Attendance	Source
September 26	at Colorado Mines	Brooks Field; Golden, CO	W 26–0	> 17,000	
October 3	Colorado Teachers	Denver University Stadium; Denver, CO	W 14–0	12,000	
October 9	Pumas CU*	Denver University Stadium; Denver, CO	W 25–6	10,000	
October 17	at Utah State	Aggie Stadium; Logan, UT	L 6–12		
October 24	Utah	Denver University Stadium; Denver, CO	L 0–46		
October 31	at Western State (CO)	Gunnison, CO	W 25–7		
November 7	at Colorado	Colorado Stadium; Boulder, CO	L 6–25	10,000	
November 14	Colorado College	Denver University Stadium; Denver, CO	L 2–9		
November 21	Temple*	Denver University Stadium; Denver, CO	L 0–18	< 1,500	
November 26	Colorado Agricultural	Denver University Stadium; Denver, CO	L 0–20	15,000	
*Non-conference game

== 1932 ==
1932 Denver Pioneers football
- Conference: Rocky Mountain Conference
- Record: 4–3–1 (4–1–1 RMC)
- Head coach: Percy Locey (1st season)
- Home stadium: Denver University Stadium

1932 Rocky Mountain Conference football standings
	Conf.					Overall
Team	W		L		T	W		L		T
Utah $	6	–	0	–	0	6	–	1	–	1
BYU	5	–	1	–	0	8	–	1	–	0
Colorado College	5	–	2	–	0	5	–	2	–	0
Denver	4	–	1	–	1	4	–	3	–	1
Colorado Agricultural	4	–	3	–	1	4	–	3	–	1
Colorado Teachers	2	–	2	–	1	4	–	2	–	1
Utah State	3	–	3	–	0	4	–	4	–	0
Colorado	2	–	4	–	0	2	–	4	–	0
Wyoming	1	–	4	–	1	2	–	6	–	1
Colorado Mines	1	–	5	–	0	1	–	7	–	0
Montana State	0	–	3	–	0	3	–	3	–	1
Western State (CO)	0	–	5	–	0	1	–	5	–	0
$ – Conference champion

The 1932 Denver Pioneers football team represented the University of Denver as a member of the Rocky Mountain Conference (RMC) during the 1932 college football season. In their first season under head coach Percy Locey, the Pioneers compiled a 4–3–1 record (4–1–1 against conference opponents), finished third in the RMC, and were outscored by a total of 74 to 60.

=== Schedule ===
Date	Opponent	Site	Result	Attendance	Source
September 24	Colorado Mines	Denver University Stadium; Denver, CO	W 13–7		
September 30	Kansas*	Denver University Stadium; Denver, CO	L 12–13		
October 7	Colorado College	Denver University Stadium; Denver, CO	W 15–6		
October 15	Colorado Agricultural	Denver University Stadium; Denver, CO	T 7–7	10,000	
October 21	at Temple*	Temple Stadium; Philadelphia, PA	L 0–14	13,000	
November 5	Wyoming	Denver University Stadium; Denver, CO	W 7–0		
November 12	at Utah	Ute Stadium; Salt Lake City, UT	L 0–27		
November 24	Colorado	Denver University Stadium; Denver, CO	W 6–0		
*Non-conference game

== 1933 ==
1933 Denver Pioneers football

RMC co-champion
- Conference: Rocky Mountain Conference
- Record: 5–3–1 (5–1–1 RMC)
- Head coach: Percy Locey (2nd season)
- Home stadium: Denver University Stadium

1933 Rocky Mountain Conference football standings
	Conf.					Overall
Team	W		L		T	W		L		T
Utah +	5	–	1	–	0	5	–	3	–	0
Colorado Agricultural +	5	–	1	–	1	5	–	1	–	1
Denver +	5	–	1	–	1	5	–	3	–	1
Colorado	5	–	2	–	0	7	–	2	–	0
BYU	5	–	3	–	0	5	–	4	–	0
Utah State	4	–	3	–	0	4	–	4	–	0
Colorado Teachers	3	–	3	–	0	4	–	3	–	0
Colorado College	2	–	4	–	1	2	–	5	–	1
Montana State	1	–	3	–	0	2	–	5	–	0
Colorado Mines	1	–	5	–	0	1	–	5	–	0
Wyoming	1	–	6	–	1	2	–	6	–	1
Western State (CO)	0	–	5	–	0	0	–	5	–	0
+ – Conference co-champions

The 1933 Denver Pioneers football team represented the University of Denver as a member of the Rocky Mountain Conference (RMC) during the 1933 college football season. In their second season under head coach Percy Locey, the Pioneers compiled a 5–3–1 record (5–1–1 against conference opponents), shared the RMC title with Colorado Agricultural and Utah, and outscored opponents by a total of 107 to 46.

=== Schedule ===
Date	Time	Opponent	Site	Result	Attendance	Source
September 22		Colorado Mines	Denver University Stadium; Denver, CO	W 19–7		
September 29	8:30 p.m.	Iowa State*	Denver University Stadium; Denver, CO	L 13–18	10,000	
October 6		Colorado Agricultural	Denver University Stadium; Denver, CO	T 0–0	12,900	
October 14		Utah State	Denver University Stadium; Denver, CO	W 12–0		
October 28		Colorado College	Denver University Stadium; Denver, CO	W 31–0		
November 4		BYU	Denver University Stadium; Denver, CO	W 6–0		
November 11		Hawaii*	Denver University Stadium; Denver, CO	L 6–7		
November 18		Utah	Denver University Stadium; Denver, CO	W 13–0	17,000	
November 30		Colorado	Denver University Stadium; Denver, CO	L 7–14	20,000	
*Non-conference game; All times are in Mountain time

== 1934 ==
1934 Denver Pioneers football
- Conference: Rocky Mountain Conference
- Record: 5–5–1 (4–4 RMC)
- Head coach: Percy Locey (3rd season)
- Home stadium: Denver University Stadium

1934 Rocky Mountain Conference football standings
	Conf.					Overall
Team	W		L		T	W		L		T
Colorado Teachers +	6	–	1	–	0	6	–	1	–	0
Colorado +	6	–	1	–	0	6	–	1	–	2
Colorado Agricultural +	6	–	1	–	1	6	–	2	–	1
Utah State	5	–	1	–	1	5	–	1	–	1
Utah	4	–	2	–	0	5	–	3	–	0
Denver	4	–	4	–	0	5	–	5	–	1
BYU	3	–	5	–	0	4	–	5	–	0
Wyoming	2	–	4	–	0	3	–	5	–	0
Colorado College	1	–	6	–	0	1	–	7	–	0
Colorado Mines	1	–	6	–	0	1	–	6	–	0
Western State (CO)	0	–	3	–	0	2	–	5	–	0
Montana State	0	–	4	–	0	2	–	5	–	0
+ – Conference co-champions

The 1934 Denver Pioneers football team represented the University of Denver as a member of the Rocky Mountain Conference (RMC) during the 1934 college football season. In their third season under head coach Percy Locey, the Pioneers compiled a 5–5–1 record (4–4 against conference opponents), finished in sixth place in the RMC, and outscored opponents by a total of 122 to 91.

=== Schedule ===
Date	Opponent	Site	Result	Attendance	Source
September 28	Utah State	Denver University Stadium; Denver, CO	L 7–26		
October 5	George Washington*	Denver University Stadium; Denver, CO	T 0–0		
October 13	Colorado Agricultural	Denver University Stadium; Denver, CO	L 0–2	9,759	
October 20	Utah	Denver University Stadium; Denver, CO	L 0–7		
October 27	Wyoming	Denver University Stadium; Denver, CO	W 9–0		
November 3	Colorado College	Denver University Stadium; Denver, CO	W 26–0		
November 10	Drake*	Denver University Stadium; Denver, CO	W 8–7		
November 17	BYU	Denver University Stadium; Denver, CO	W 24–6		
November 24	Colorado Mines	Denver University Stadium; Denver, CO	W 34–0		
November 29	Colorado	Denver University Stadium; Denver, CO	L 0–7		
December 15	at Hawaii*	Honolulu Stadium; Honolulu, Territory of Hawaii (Police Relief Ass'n benefit)	L 14–36	18,000–20,000	
*Non-conference game

== 1935 ==
1935 Denver Pioneers football
- Conference: Rocky Mountain Conference
- Record: 6–3 (5–2 RMC)
- Head coach: Percy Locey (4th season)
- Home stadium: Denver University Stadium

1935 Rocky Mountain Conference football standings
	Conf.					Overall
Team	W		L		T	W		L		T
Colorado +	5	–	1	–	0	5	–	4	–	0
Utah State +	5	–	1	–	1	5	–	2	–	1
Utah	4	–	1	–	1	4	–	3	–	1
Denver	5	–	2	–	0	6	–	3	–	0
Colorado College	4	–	2	–	1	4	–	3	–	1
Colorado State–Greeley	2	–	1	–	0	4	–	3	–	0
BYU	3	–	4	–	0	4	–	4	–	0
Wyoming	3	–	4	–	0	4	–	4	–	0
Colorado A&M	2	–	4	–	1	3	–	4	–	1
Montana State	1	–	5	–	0	2	–	6	–	1
Colorado Mines	1	–	6	–	0	1	–	6	–	0
Western State (CO)	0	–	4	–	0	1	–	6	–	0
+ – Conference co-champions

The 1935 Denver Pioneers football team represented the University of Denver as a member of the Rocky Mountain Conference (RMC) during the 1935 college football season. In their fourth and final season under head coach Percy Locey, the Pioneers compiled a 6–3 record (5–2 against conference opponents), finished fourth in the RMC, and outscored opponents by a total of 109 to 101.

=== Schedule ===
Date	Opponent	Site	Result	Attendance	Source
September 28	Colorado College	Denver University Stadium; Denver, CO	W 19–0		
October 5	Colorado A&M	Denver University Stadium; Denver, CO	W 20–14		
October 11	Wyoming	Denver University Stadium; Denver, CO	W 14–0	13,000	
October 19	Utah State	Denver University Stadium; Denver, CO	W 13–7	11,925	
October 26	at Utah	Ute Stadium; Salt Lake City, UT	L 14–39	10,000	
November 2	at Colorado Mines	Brooks Field; Golden, CO	W 13–0		
November 9	Hawaii*	Denver University Stadium; Denver, CO	W 14–7	15,000	
November 16	at San Francisco*	Kezar Stadium; San Francisco, CA	L 2–20	< 2,000	
November 28	Colorado	Denver University Stadium; Denver, CO	L 0–14	28,000–30,000	
*Non-conference game

== 1936 ==
1936 Denver Pioneers football
- Conference: Rocky Mountain Conference
- Record: 7–1–1 (6–1–1 RMC)
- Head coach: Bill Saunders (1st season)
- Home stadium: Denver University Stadium

1936 Rocky Mountain Conference football standings
	Conf.					Overall
Team	W		L		T	W		L		T
Utah State $	6	–	0	–	1	7	–	0	–	1
Denver	6	–	1	–	1	7	–	1	–	1
Utah	5	–	2	–	0	6	–	3	–	0
Colorado	4	–	2	–	0	4	–	3	–	0
Colorado State–Greeley	4	–	3	–	0	5	–	4	–	0
BYU	4	–	4	–	0	4	–	5	–	0
Colorado A&M	3	–	4	–	1	4	–	4	–	1
Colorado College	3	–	4	–	0	3	–	4	–	1
Wyoming	2	–	4	–	1	2	–	5	–	1
Montana State	1	–	4	–	0	3	–	5	–	0
Western State (CO)	1	–	5	–	0	1	–	6	–	0
Colorado Mines	0	–	6	–	0	2	–	6	–	0
$ – Conference champion

The 1936 Denver Pioneers football team represented the University of Denver as a member of the Rocky Mountain Conference (RMC) during the 1936 college football season. In their first season under head coach Bill Saunders, the Pioneers compiled a 7–1–1 record (6–1–1 against conference opponents), finished second in the RMC, and outscored opponents by a total of 141 to 88.

=== Schedule ===
Date	Opponent	Site	Result	Attendance	Source
September 25	Colorado Mines	Denver University Stadium; Denver, CO	W 20–8		
October 2	Colorado College	Denver University Stadium; Denver, CO	W 7–2		
October 10	Colorado A&M	Denver University Stadium; Denver, CO	W 14–7	14,000	
October 17	Utah^{†}	Denver University Stadium; Denver, CO	L 6–31	> 15,000	
October 24	Wyoming	Denver University Stadium; Denver, CO	W 25–14		
October 31	Utah State	Denver University Stadium; Denver, CO	T 0–0	9,571	
November 7	at Drake*	Drake Stadium; Des Moines, IA	W 27–13	4,000	
November 14	BYU	Denver University Stadium; Denver, CO	W 35–7	6,070	
November 26	Colorado	Denver University Stadium; Denver, CO	W 7–6	27,770	
*Non-conference game; ^{†}Homecoming

== 1937 ==
1937 Denver Pioneers football
- Conference: Rocky Mountain Conference
- Record: 6–3 (5–2 RMC)
- Head coach: Bill Saunders (2nd season)
- Home stadium: Denver University Stadium

1937 Rocky Mountain Conference football standings
	Conf.					Overall
Team	W		L		T	W		L		T
No. 17 Colorado $	7	–	0	–	0	8	–	1	–	0
BYU	5	–	2	–	0	6	–	3	–	0
Denver	5	–	2	–	0	6	–	3	–	0
Utah	5	–	2	–	0	5	–	3	–	0
Western State (CO)	3	–	1	–	0	5	–	3	–	0
Colorado College	3	–	3	–	0	5	–	4	–	0
Utah State	2	–	4	–	1	2	–	4	–	2
Wyoming	2	–	4	–	0	3	–	5	–	0
Colorado State–Greeley	2	–	4	–	0	2	–	6	–	0
Montana State	0	–	3	–	1	3	–	4	–	1
Colorado Mines	1	–	5	–	0	2	–	5	–	0
Colorado A&M	1	–	6	–	0	1	–	7	–	0
$ – Conference champion; Rankings from AP Poll

The 1937 Denver Pioneers football team represented the University of Denver as a member of the Rocky Mountain Conference (RMC) during the 1937 college football season. In their second season under head coach Bill Saunders, the Pioneers compiled a 6–3 record (5–2 against conference opponents, tied for third in the RMC, and outscored opponents by a total of 122 to 61.

=== Schedule ===
Date	Opponent	Site	Result	Attendance	Source
September 25	at Colorado Mines	Golden, CO	W 12–0	12,959	
October 1	New Mexico*	Denver University Stadium; Denver, CO	W 12–0	10,000	
October 9	Colorado A&M	Denver University Stadium; Denver, CO	W 22–0	10,023	
October 16	Colorado College	Denver University Stadium; Denver, CO	L 4–7		
October 23	at Utah	Ute Stadium; Salt Lake City, UT	W 13–7	13,000	
November 6	Utah State	Denver University Stadium; Denver, CO	W 25–0	10,000	
November 13	Wyoming	Denver University Stadium; Denver, CO	W 21–6		
November 25	No. 16 Colorado	Denver University Stadium; Denver, CO	L 7–34		
December 18	at Hawaii*	Honolulu Stadium; Honolulu, HI	L 6–7	16,000	
*Non-conference game; Rankings from Coaches' Poll released prior to the game

== 1938 ==
1938 Denver Pioneers football
- Conference: Mountain States Conference
- Record: 4–4–1 (3–2–1 MSC)
- Head coach: Bill Saunders (3rd season)
- Home stadium: Denver University Stadium

1938 Mountain States Conference football standings
	Conf.					Overall
Team	W		L		T	W		L		T
Utah $	4	–	0	–	2	7	–	1	–	2
BYU	3	–	2	–	1	4	–	3	–	1
Denver	3	–	2	–	1	4	–	4	–	1
Colorado	3	–	2	–	1	3	–	4	–	1
Utah State	3	–	3	–	0	4	–	4	–	0
Wyoming	1	–	4	–	1	2	–	5	–	1
Colorado A&M	0	–	4	–	2	1	–	5	–	2
$ – Conference champion

The 1938 Denver Pioneers football team represented the University of Denver as a member of the Mountain States Conference (MSC) during the 1938 college football season. In their third season under head coach Bill Saunders, the Pioneers compiled a 4–4–1 record (3–2–1 against conference opponents), tied for second place in the MSC, and were outscored by a total of 86 to 65.

=== Schedule ===
Date	Opponent	Site	Result	Attendance	Source
September 23	Iowa State*	Denver University Stadium; Denver, CO	L 7–14	14,786	
September 30	BYU	Denver University Stadium; Denver, CO	L 0–20	14,000	
October 7	Colorado A&M	Denver University Stadium; Denver, CO	T 0–0		
October 15	Utah State	Denver University Stadium; Denver, CO	W 7–0	8,000	
October 22	at Wyoming	Corbett Field; Laramie, WY	W 6–0	5,500	
October 29	at Utah	Ute Stadium; Salt Lake City, UT	L 0–21		
November 5	at New Mexico*	University Stadium; Albuquerque, NM	L 6–7	> 6,000	
November 12	Hawaii*	Denver University Stadium; Denver, CO	W 20–12	7,619	
November 24	Colorado	Denver University Stadium; Denver, CO	W 19–12	25,000	
*Non-conference game

== 1939 ==
1939 Denver Pioneers football
- Conference: Mountain States Conference
- Record: 5–3–1 (3–2–1 MSC)
- Head coach: Cac Hubbard (1st season)
- Home stadium: Denver University Stadium

1939 Mountain States Conference football standings
	Conf.					Overall
Team	W		L		T	W		L		T
Colorado $	5	–	1	–	0	5	–	3	–	0
Utah	4	–	1	–	1	6	–	1	–	2
Denver	3	–	2	–	1	5	–	3	–	1
BYU	2	–	2	–	2	5	–	2	–	2
Utah State	2	–	3	–	1	3	–	4	–	1
Colorado A&M	2	–	4	–	0	2	–	7	–	0
Wyoming	0	–	5	–	1	0	–	7	–	1
$ – Conference champion

The 1939 Denver Pioneers football team represented the University of Denver as a member of the Mountain States Conference (MSC) during the 1939 college football season. In their first season under head coach Cac Hubbard, the Pioneers compiled a 5–3–1 record (3–2–1 against conference opponents), finished in third place in the MSC, and outscored opponents by a total of 129 to 75.

Denver was ranked at No. 112 (out of 609 teams) in the final Litkenhous Ratings for 1939.

=== Schedule ===
Date	Opponent	Site	Result	Attendance	Source
September 29	Iowa State*	Denver University Stadium; Denver, CO	W 6–0	18,000	
October 6	New Mexico*	Denver University Stadium; Denver, CO	L 6–7	13,000	
October 13	Wyoming	Denver University Stadium; Denver, CO	W 32–7	8,000	
October 21	at Utah State	Aggie Stadium; Logan, UT	W 7–0		
October 28	Utah	Denver University Stadium; Denver, CO	T 7–7		
November 4	BYU	Denver University Stadium; Denver, CO	L 18–21		
November 11	Colorado A&M^{†}	Denver University Stadium; Denver, CO	W 13–6	12,500	
November 23	Idaho*	Denver University Stadium; Denver, CO	W 23–0	14,000	
November 30	at Colorado	Colorado Stadium; Boulder, CO	L 17–27	18,000	
*Non-conference game; ^{†}Homecoming
