= 1955 Montana State Bobcats football team =

American college football season

1955 Montana State Bobcats football
- Conference: Rocky Mountain Conference
- Record: 4–4–1 (3–2–1 RMC)
- Head coach: Wally Lemm (1st season)
- Home stadium: Gatton Field

1955 Rocky Mountain Conference football standings
	Conf.					Overall
Team	W		L		T	W		L		T
Idaho State $	6	–	0	–	0	8	–	1	–	0
Western State (CO)	6	–	2	–	0	7	–	3	–	0
Montana State	3	–	2	–	1	4	–	4	–	1
Colorado Mines	2	–	4	–	2	2	–	5	–	2
Colorado College	2	–	6	–	0	3	–	7	–	0
Colorado State–Greeley	1	–	6	–	1	1	–	7	–	1
$ – Conference champion

The 1955 Montana State Bobcats football team was an American football team that represented Montana State University in the Rocky Mountain Conference (RMC) during the 1955 college football season. In its first and only season under head coach Wally Lemm, the team compiled a 4–4–1 record (3–2–1 against conference opponents) and finished third out of six teams in the RMC.

== Schedule ==
Date	Opponent	Site	Result	Attendance	Source
September 17	Lewis & Clark*	Gatton Field; Bozeman, MT	W 7–6		
September 24	at Colorado Mines	Brooks Field; Golden, CO	T 0–0		
October 1	Idaho State	Gatton Field; Bozeman, MT	L 14–28		
October 8	at Colorado College	Washburn Field; Colorado Springs, CO	W 39–14		
October 15	Colorado State–Greeley^{†}	Gatton Field; Bozeman, MT	W 29–7		
October 22	at Western State (CO)	Gunnison, CO	W 20–6		
October 29	at Idaho State	Spud Bowl; Pocatello, ID	L 0–20		
November 5	Montana*	Gatton Field; Bozeman, MT (rivalry)	L 0–19	7,500	
November 19	at Whitworth	Memorial Stadium; Spokane, WA	L 0–20	< 1,000	
*Non-conference game; ^{†}Homecoming
