= 1933 Wyoming Cowboys football team =

American college football season

1933 Wyoming Cowboys football
- Conference: Rocky Mountain Conference
- Record: 2–6–1 (1–6–1 RMC)
- Head coach: Willard Witte (1st season)
- Captain: None
- Home stadium: Corbett Field

1933 Rocky Mountain Conference football standings
	Conf.					Overall
Team	W		L		T	W		L		T
Colorado Agricultural +	5	–	1	–	1	5	–	1	–	1
Utah +	5	–	1	–	0	5	–	3	–	0
Denver +	5	–	1	–	1	5	–	3	–	1
Colorado	5	–	2	–	0	7	–	2	–	0
BYU	5	–	3	–	0	5	–	4	–	0
Utah State	4	–	3	–	0	4	–	4	–	0
Colorado Teachers	3	–	3	–	0	4	–	3	–	0
Colorado College	2	–	4	–	1	2	–	5	–	1
Montana State	1	–	3	–	0	2	–	5	–	0
Colorado Mines	1	–	5	–	0	1	–	5	–	0
Wyoming	1	–	6	–	1	2	–	6	–	1
Western State (CO)	0	–	5	–	0	0	–	5	–	0
+ – Conference co-champions

The 1933 Wyoming Cowboys football team was an American football team that represented the University of Wyoming in the Rocky Mountain Conference (RMC) during the 1933 college football season. In their first season under head coach Willard Witte, the Cowboys compiled a 2–6–1 record (1–6–1 against conference opponents), finished eleventh in the RMC, and were outscored by a total of 114 to 54.

== Schedule ==
Date	Opponent	Site	Result	Source
September 23	at Fort Warren*	Cheyenne, WY	W 33–0	
September 30	Colorado Agricultural	Corbett Field; Laramie, WY (rivalry)	L 0–7	
October 7	at Colorado College	Washburn Field; Colorado Springs, CO	T 0–0	
October 14	Montana State^{†}	Corbett Field; Laramie, WY	L 0–7	
October 21	at Colorado Teachers	Jackson Field; Greeley, CO	L 0–27	
October 28	at Colorado	Colorado Stadium; Boulder, CO	L 12–40	
November 4	at Utah State	Aggie Stadium; Logan, UT (rivalry)	L 0–27	
November 25	Western State (CO)	Corbett Field; Laramie, WY	W 6–0	
November 30	at BYU	Provo, UT	L 0–3	
*Non-conference game; ^{†}Homecoming
