= 1955 Idaho State Bengals football team =

American college football season

1955 Idaho State Bengals football

RMC champion
- Conference: Rocky Mountain Conference
- Record: 8–1 (6–0 RMC)
- Head coach: Babe Caccia (4th season)
- Captains: Larry Kent; Howard Green
- Home stadium: Spud Bowl

1955 Rocky Mountain Conference football standings
	Conf.					Overall
Team	W		L		T	W		L		T
Idaho State $	6	–	0	–	0	8	–	1	–	0
Western State (CO)	6	–	2	–	0	7	–	3	–	0
Montana State	3	–	2	–	1	4	–	4	–	1
Colorado Mines	2	–	4	–	2	2	–	5	–	2
Colorado College	2	–	6	–	0	3	–	7	–	0
Colorado State–Greeley	1	–	6	–	1	1	–	7	–	1
$ – Conference champion

The 1955 Idaho State Bengals football team was an American football team that represented Idaho State University as a member of the Rocky Mountain Conference (RMC) during the 1955 college football season. In their fourth season under head coach Babe Caccia, the Bengals compiled an 8–1 record (6–0 against conference opponents), won the RMC championship, and outscored opponents by a total of 171 to 70. The team captains were Larry Kent and Howard Green.

== Schedule ==
Date	Time	Opponent	Site	TV	Result	Attendance	Source
September 17		Pepperdine*	Spud Bowl; Pocatello, ID		W 9–0		
September 24		Colorado College	Spud Bowl; Pocatello, ID		W 27–0		
October 1		at Montana State	Gatton Field; Bozeman, MT		W 28–14		
October 7		at Colorado State–Greeley	Jackson Field; Greeley, CO		W 19–0		
October 15	2:30 p.m.	Western State (CO)^{†}	Spud Bowl; Pocatello, ID		W 14–6	5,000	
October 21		vs. College of Idaho*	Bronco Stadium; Boise, ID		W 20–19		
October 29		Montana State	Spud Bowl; Pocatello, ID		W 20–0		
November 5		Colorado Mines	Spud Bowl; Pocatello, ID		W 27–13		
November 11		at Omaha*	Omaha, NE	WOW-TV	L 7–18		
*Non-conference game; ^{†}Homecoming; All times are in Mountain time

== After the season ==
The following Bengal was selected in the 1956 NFL draft after the season.

Round	Pick	Player	Position	NFL club
23	271	Al Stephenson	Tackle	Baltimore Colts
