= 1936 BYU Cougars football team =

American college football season

1936 BYU Cougars football
- Conference: Rocky Mountain Conference
- Record: 4–5 (4–4 RMC)
- Head coach: G. Ott Romney (9th season)

1936 Rocky Mountain Conference football standings
	Conf.					Overall
Team	W		L		T	W		L		T
Utah State $	6	–	0	–	1	7	–	0	–	1
Denver	6	–	1	–	1	7	–	1	–	1
Utah	5	–	2	–	0	6	–	3	–	0
Colorado	4	–	2	–	0	4	–	3	–	0
Colorado State–Greeley	4	–	3	–	0	5	–	4	–	0
BYU	4	–	4	–	0	4	–	5	–	0
Colorado A&M	3	–	4	–	1	4	–	4	–	1
Colorado College	3	–	4	–	0	3	–	4	–	1
Wyoming	2	–	4	–	1	2	–	5	–	1
Montana State	1	–	4	–	0	3	–	5	–	0
Western State (CO)	1	–	5	–	0	1	–	6	–	0
Colorado Mines	0	–	6	–	0	2	–	6	–	0
$ – Conference champion

The 1936 BYU Cougars football team was an American football team that represented Brigham Young University (BYU) as a member of the Rocky Mountain Conference (RMC) during the 1936 college football season. In their ninth and final season under head coach G. Ott Romney, the Cougars compiled an overall record of 4–5 with a mark of 4–4 against conference opponents, finished sixth in the RMC, scored 123 points, and allowed opponents to score 123 points.

== Schedule ==
Date	Opponent	Site	Result	Attendance	Source
September 25	at Arizona*	Arizona Stadium; Tucson, AZ	L 6–32	8,000	
October 3	Montana State	Provo, UT	W 19–0		
October 9	at Colorado State–Greeley	Jackson Field; Greeley, CO	W 33–0		
October 17	Utah State	Provo, UT (rivalry)	L 0–13	6,500	
October 31	at Utah	Ute Stadium; Salt Lake City, UT (rivalry)	L 0–18		
November 7	Western State (CO)	Gunnison, CO	W 26–12		
November 14	at Denver	DU Stadium; Denver, CO	L 7–35	6,070	
November 21	Wyoming	Provo, UT	W 32–7		
November 28	at Colorado College	Washburn Field; Colorado Springs, CO	L 0–6		
*Non-conference game
