= 1933 Utah State Aggies football team =

American college football season

1933 Utah State Aggies football
- Conference: Rocky Mountain Conference
- Record: 4–4 (4–3 RMC)
- Head coach: Dick Romney (15th season)
- Home stadium: Aggie Stadium

1933 Rocky Mountain Conference football standings
	Conf.					Overall
Team	W		L		T	W		L		T
Utah +	5	–	1	–	0	5	–	3	–	0
Colorado Agricultural +	5	–	1	–	1	5	–	1	–	1
Denver +	5	–	1	–	1	5	–	3	–	1
Colorado	5	–	2	–	0	7	–	2	–	0
BYU	5	–	3	–	0	5	–	4	–	0
Utah State	4	–	3	–	0	4	–	4	–	0
Colorado Teachers	3	–	3	–	0	4	–	3	–	0
Colorado College	2	–	4	–	1	2	–	5	–	1
Montana State	1	–	3	–	0	2	–	5	–	0
Colorado Mines	1	–	5	–	0	1	–	5	–	0
Wyoming	1	–	6	–	1	2	–	6	–	1
Western State (CO)	0	–	5	–	0	0	–	5	–	0
+ – Conference co-champions

The 1933 Utah State Aggies football team was an American football team that represented Utah State Agricultural College in the Rocky Mountain Conference (RMC) during the 1933 college football season. In their 15th season under head coach Dick Romney, the Aggies compiled a 4–4 record (4–3 against RMC opponents), finished sixth in the conference, and outscored all opponents by a total of 115 to 61. The team won all three of its home games by a combined score of 69 to 0.

== Schedule ==
Date	Opponent	Site	Result	Attendance	Source
September 30	Western State (CO)	Aggie Stadium; Logan, UT	W 28–0		
October 7	at Montana State	Gatton Field; Bozeman, MT	W 40–6		
October 14	at Denver	DU Stadium; Denver, CO	L 0–12		
October 28	at Utah	Ute Stadium; Salt Lake City, UT (rivalry)	L 6–14		
November 4	Wyoming	Aggie Stadium; Logan, UT (rivalry)	W 27–0		
November 11	at Colorado Agricultural	Colorado Field; Fort Collins, CO	L 0–3		
November 18	BYU	Aggie Stadium; Logan, UT (rivalry)	W 14–0		
November 30	at Montana*	Dornblaser Field; Missoula, MT	L 0–26	3,200	
*Non-conference game
