= 1930 Montana State Bobcats football team =

American college football season

1930 Montana State Bobcats football
- Conference: Rocky Mountain Conference
- Record: 6–3 (1–1 RMC)
- Head coach: Schubert R. Dyche (3rd season)
- Home stadium: Gatton Field

1930 Rocky Mountain Conference football standings
	Conf.					Overall
Team	W		L		T	W		L		T
Utah $	7	–	0	–	0	8	–	0	–	0
Colorado	5	–	1	–	1	6	–	1	–	1
BYU	4	–	1	–	1	5	–	2	–	4
Denver	4	–	3	–	0	5	–	4	–	0
Colorado Agricultural	3	–	3	–	1	3	–	5	–	1
Montana State	1	–	1	–	0	6	–	3	–	0
Colorado Teachers	2	–	2	–	3	2	–	2	–	3
Utah State	3	–	4	–	1	3	–	5	–	1
Colorado College	2	–	4	–	2	2	–	4	–	2
Wyoming	1	–	5	–	1	2	–	5	–	1
Colorado Mines	1	–	4	–	0	1	–	5	–	0
Western State (CO)	0	–	5	–	0	0	–	6	–	0
$ – Conference champion

The 1930 Montana State Bobcats football team was an American football team that represented Montana State College (later renamed Montana State University) in the Rocky Mountain Conference (RMC) during the 1930 college football season. In its third season under head coach Schubert R. Dyche, the team compiled a 6–3 record (1–1 against RMC opponents) and outscored opponents by a total of 175 to 123.

== Schedule ==
Date	Opponent	Site	Result	Attendance	Source
September 20	Centerville (Butte)*	Bozeman, MT	W 38–0		
September 27	at Idaho*	MacLean Field; Moscow, ID	W 7–6		
October 4	Regis (CO)*	Gatton Field; Bozeman, MT	W 26–19		
October 11	at Wyoming	Campus athletic grounds; Laramie, WY	W 20–13		
October 18	vs. Montana*	Clark Park; Butte, MT (rivalry)	L 6–13	7,500	
October 25	at Nebraska*	Memorial Stadium; Lincoln, NE	L 7–53		
November 15	at BYU	BYU Stadium; Provo, UT	L 6–19	2,500	
November 27	vs. Mount St. Charles*	High School Stadium; Great Falls, MT	W 21–0		
*Non-conference game
