= 1930 Utah State Aggies football team =

American college football season

1930 Utah State Aggies football
- Conference: Rocky Mountain Conference
- Record: 3–5–1 (3–4–1 RMC)
- Head coach: Dick Romney (12th season)
- Home stadium: Aggie Stadium

1930 Rocky Mountain Conference football standings
	Conf.					Overall
Team	W		L		T	W		L		T
Utah $	7	–	0	–	0	8	–	0	–	0
Colorado	5	–	1	–	1	6	–	1	–	1
BYU	4	–	1	–	1	5	–	2	–	4
Denver	4	–	3	–	0	5	–	4	–	0
Colorado Agricultural	3	–	3	–	1	3	–	5	–	1
Montana State	1	–	1	–	0	6	–	3	–	0
Colorado Teachers	2	–	2	–	3	2	–	2	–	3
Utah State	3	–	4	–	1	3	–	5	–	1
Colorado College	2	–	4	–	2	2	–	4	–	2
Wyoming	1	–	5	–	1	2	–	5	–	1
Colorado Mines	1	–	4	–	0	1	–	5	–	0
Western State (CO)	0	–	5	–	0	0	–	6	–	0
$ – Conference champion

The 1930 Utah State Aggies football team was an American football team that represented Utah State Agricultural College in the Rocky Mountain Conference (RMC) during the 1930 college football season. In their 12th season under head coach Dick Romney, the Aggies compiled a 3–5–1 record (3–4–1 against RMC opponents), tied for seventh place in the conference, and were outscored by a total of 205 to 73.

== Schedule ==
Date	Opponent	Site	Result	Attendance	Source
September 27	Western State (CO)	Aggie Stadium; Logan, UT	W 31–0		
October 4	at Colorado College	Washburn Field; Colorado Springs, CO	W 8–7		
October 11	Colorado	Aggie Stadium; Logan, UT	T 0–0	8,000	
October 18	at USC*	Los Angeles Memorial Coliseum; Los Angeles, CA	L 0–65	25,000	
October 25	Wyoming	Aggie Stadium; Logan, UT (rivalry)	W 13–8		
November 1	vs. BYU	Ogden Stadium; Ogden, UT (rivalry)	L 14–39	7,000	
November 8	at Denver	DU Stadium; Denver, CO	L 7–32		
November 15	Colorado Agricultural	Aggie Stadium; Logan, UT	L 0–13		
November 27	at Utah	Ute Stadium; Salt Lake City, UT (rivalry)	L 0–41	8,000	
*Non-conference game
