= 1933 BYU Cougars football team =

American college football season

1933 BYU Cougars football
- Conference: Rocky Mountain Conference
- Record: 5–4 (5–3 RMC)
- Head coach: G. Ott Romney (6th season)

1933 Rocky Mountain Conference football standings
	Conf.					Overall
Team	W		L		T	W		L		T
Utah +	5	–	1	–	0	5	–	3	–	0
Colorado Agricultural +	5	–	1	–	1	5	–	1	–	1
Denver +	5	–	1	–	1	5	–	3	–	1
Colorado	5	–	2	–	0	7	–	2	–	0
BYU	5	–	3	–	0	5	–	4	–	0
Utah State	4	–	3	–	0	4	–	4	–	0
Colorado Teachers	3	–	3	–	0	4	–	3	–	0
Colorado College	2	–	4	–	1	2	–	5	–	1
Montana State	1	–	3	–	0	2	–	5	–	0
Colorado Mines	1	–	5	–	0	1	–	5	–	0
Wyoming	1	–	6	–	1	2	–	6	–	1
Western State (CO)	0	–	5	–	0	0	–	5	–	0
+ – Conference co-champions

The 1933 BYU Cougars football team was an American football team that represented Brigham Young University (BYU) as a member of the Rocky Mountain Conference (RMC) during the 1933 college football season. In their sixth season under head coach G. Ott Romney, the Cougars compiled an overall record of 5–4 with a mark of 5–3 against conference opponents, finished fifth in the RMC, and were outscored by a total of 104 to 69.

== Schedule ==
Date	Opponent	Site	Result	Attendance	Source
September 23	at San Diego Marines*	San Diego, CA	L 0–21	3,000	
September 30	Montana State^{†}	Provo, UT	W 25–0	6,000	
October 6	at Colorado Teachers	Jackson Field; Greeley, CO	W 6–2		
October 14	at Utah	Ute Stadium; Salt Lake City, UT (rivalry)	L 6–21	15,000	
October 21	at Western State (CO)	Gunnison, CO	W 13–0		
November 4	at Denver	DU Stadium; Denver, CO	L 0–6		
November 11	at Colorado College	Washburn Field; Colorado Springs, CO	W 25–0		
November 18	at Utah State	Aggie Stadium; Logan, UT (rivalry)	L 0–14		
November 30	Wyoming	Provo, UT	W 6–3		
*Non-conference game; ^{†}Homecoming
