= 1930 Colorado Agricultural Aggies football team =

American college football season

1930 Colorado Agricultural Aggies football
- Conference: Rocky Mountain Conference
- Record: 3–5–1 (3–3–1 RMC)
- Head coach: Harry W. Hughes (20th season)
- Home stadium: Colorado Field

1930 Rocky Mountain Conference football standings
	Conf.					Overall
Team	W		L		T	W		L		T
Utah $	7	–	0	–	0	8	–	0	–	0
Colorado	5	–	1	–	1	6	–	1	–	1
BYU	4	–	1	–	1	5	–	2	–	4
Denver	4	–	3	–	0	5	–	4	–	0
Colorado Agricultural	3	–	3	–	1	3	–	5	–	1
Montana State	1	–	1	–	0	6	–	3	–	0
Colorado Teachers	2	–	2	–	3	2	–	2	–	3
Utah State	3	–	4	–	1	3	–	5	–	1
Colorado College	2	–	4	–	2	2	–	4	–	2
Colorado Mines	1	–	4	–	0	1	–	5	–	0
Wyoming	1	–	5	–	1	2	–	5	–	1
Western State (CO)	0	–	5	–	0	0	–	6	–	0
$ – Conference champion

The 1930 Colorado Agricultural Aggies football team represented Colorado Agricultural College (now known as Colorado State University) in the Rocky Mountain Conference (RMC) during the 1930 college football season. In their 20th season under head coach Harry W. Hughes, the Aggies compiled a 3–5–1 record (3–3–1 against conference opponents), finished fifth in the RMC, and were outscored by a total of 104 to 67.

== Schedule ==
Date	Opponent	Site	Result	Attendance	Source
September 27	at Regis*	Denver University Stadium; Denver, CO	L 7–14		
October 11	at Denver	Denver University Stadium; Denver, CO	W 15–7		
October 18	at Colorado Teachers	Greeley, CO	W 26–0		
October 25	at Colorado	Colorado Stadium; Boulder, CO (rivalry)	L 0–7		
November 1	Utah	Colorado Field; Fort Collins, CO	L 0–39		
November 8	Wyoming	Colorado Field; Fort Collins, CO (rivalry)	L 6–21		
November 15	at Utah State	Aggie Stadium; Logan, UT	W 13–0		
November 22	Colorado College	Colorado Field; Fort Collins, CO	T 0–0		
November 27	at Arizona*	Arizona Stadium; Tucson, AZ	L 0–16	2,300	
*Non-conference game
