= 1936 Utah Utes football team =

American college football season

1936 Utah Utes football
- Conference: Rocky Mountain Conference
- Record: 6–3 (5–2 RMC)
- Head coach: Ike Armstrong (12th season)
- Home stadium: Ute Stadium

1936 Rocky Mountain Conference football standings
	Conf.					Overall
Team	W		L		T	W		L		T
Utah State $	6	–	0	–	1	7	–	0	–	1
Denver	6	–	1	–	1	7	–	1	–	1
Utah	5	–	2	–	0	6	–	3	–	0
Colorado	4	–	2	–	0	4	–	3	–	0
Colorado State–Greeley	4	–	3	–	0	5	–	4	–	0
BYU	4	–	4	–	0	4	–	5	–	0
Colorado A&M	3	–	4	–	1	4	–	4	–	1
Colorado College	3	–	4	–	0	3	–	4	–	1
Wyoming	2	–	4	–	1	2	–	5	–	1
Montana State	1	–	4	–	0	3	–	5	–	0
Western State (CO)	1	–	5	–	0	1	–	6	–	0
Colorado Mines	0	–	6	–	0	2	–	6	–	0
$ – Conference champion

The 1936 Utah Utes football team was an American football team that represented the University of Utah as a member of the Rocky Mountain Conference (RMC) during the 1936 college football season. In their 12thseason under head coach Ike Armstrong, the Utes compiled an overall record of 6–3 with a mark of 5–2 in conference play, placing third in the RMC.

In 1936, the AP Poll began ranking teams on a weekly basis. On November 14, Utah played its first ranked opponent when Texas A&M visited Ute Stadium for homecoming. Utah lost, 20–7.

== Schedule ==
Date	Opponent	Site	Result	Attendance	Source
September 26	Colorado State–Greeley	Ute Stadium; Salt Lake City, UT	W 26–0		
October 3	Arizona*	Ute Stadium; Salt Lake City, UT	W 14–6		
October 10	Western State (CO)	Ute Stadium; Salt Lake City, UT	W 26–0	5,562	
October 17	at Denver	DU Stadium; Denver, CO	W 31–6	> 15,000	
October 24	at Utah State	Aggie Stadium; Logan, UT (rivalry)	L 0–12	13,200	
October 31	BYU	Ute Stadium; Salt Lake City, UT (rivalry)	W 18–0		
November 7	at Colorado	Colorado Stadium; Boulder, CO (rivalry)	L 7–31	6,000	
November 14	No. 15 Texas A&M*^{†}	Ute Stadium; Salt Lake City, UT	L 7–20		
November 26	Colorado A&M	Ute Stadium; Salt Lake City, UT	W 13–0	14,000	
*Non-conference game; ^{†}Homecoming; Rankings from AP Poll released prior to the game
