= 1936 Utah State Aggies football team =

American college football season

1936 Utah State Aggies football

RMC champion
- Conference: Rocky Mountain Conference
- Record: 7–0–1 (6–0–1 RMC)
- Head coach: Dick Romney (18th season)
- Home stadium: Aggie Stadium

1936 Rocky Mountain Conference football standings
	Conf.					Overall
Team	W		L		T	W		L		T
Utah State $	6	–	0	–	1	7	–	0	–	1
Denver	6	–	1	–	1	7	–	1	–	1
Utah	5	–	2	–	0	6	–	3	–	0
Colorado	4	–	2	–	0	4	–	3	–	0
Colorado State–Greeley	4	–	3	–	0	5	–	4	–	0
BYU	4	–	4	–	0	4	–	5	–	0
Colorado A&M	3	–	4	–	1	4	–	4	–	1
Colorado College	3	–	4	–	0	3	–	4	–	1
Wyoming	2	–	4	–	1	2	–	5	–	1
Montana State	1	–	4	–	0	3	–	5	–	0
Western State (CO)	1	–	5	–	0	1	–	6	–	0
Colorado Mines	0	–	6	–	0	2	–	6	–	0
$ – Conference champion

The 1936 Utah State Aggies football team was an American football team that represented Utah State Agricultural College in the Rocky Mountain Conference (RMC) during the 1936 college football season. In their 18th season under head coach Dick Romney, the Aggies compiled a 7–0–1 record (6–0–1 against RMC opponents), won the RMC championship, and outscored opponents by a total of 99 to 13.

Halfback Kent Ryan received first-team All-American honors in 1936 from the All-America Board. Three Utah State players received first-team all-conference honors in 1936: Ryan; end Carl Mulleneaux; and guard Ed Peterson.

== Schedule ==
Date	Opponent	Site	Result	Attendance	Source
September 26	Montana State	Aggie Stadium; Logan, UT	W 12–0		
October 10	at Wyoming	Corbett Field; Laramie, WY (rivalry)	W 25–0		
October 17	at BYU	old Cougar Stadium; Provo, UT (rivalry)	W 13–0	6,500	
October 24	Utah^{†}	Aggie Stadium; Logan, UT (rivalry)	W 12–0	13,200	
October 31	at Denver	DU Stadium; Denver, CO	T 0–0	9,571	
November 7	at Colorado A&M	Colorado Field; Fort Collins, CO	W 13–0		
November 14	Colorado	Aggie Stadium; Logan, UT	W 14–13	11,000	
November 26	vs. Idaho*	Ogden Stadium; Ogden, UT	W 10–0	11,000	
*Non-conference game; ^{†}Homecoming
