= 1930 Colorado College Tigers football team =

American college football season

1930 Colorado College Tigers football
- Conference: Rocky Mountain Conference
- Record: 2–4–2 (2–4–2 RMC)
- Head coach: William T. Van de Graaff (5th season)
- Home stadium: Washburn Field

1930 Rocky Mountain Conference football standings
	Conf.					Overall
Team	W		L		T	W		L		T
Utah $	7	–	0	–	0	8	–	0	–	0
Colorado	5	–	1	–	1	6	–	1	–	1
BYU	4	–	1	–	1	5	–	2	–	4
Denver	4	–	3	–	0	5	–	4	–	0
Colorado Agricultural	3	–	3	–	1	3	–	5	–	1
Montana State	1	–	1	–	0	6	–	3	–	0
Colorado Teachers	2	–	2	–	3	2	–	2	–	3
Utah State	3	–	4	–	1	3	–	5	–	1
Colorado College	2	–	4	–	2	2	–	4	–	2
Wyoming	1	–	5	–	1	2	–	5	–	1
Colorado Mines	1	–	4	–	0	1	–	5	–	0
Western State (CO)	0	–	5	–	0	0	–	6	–	0
$ – Conference champion

The 1930 Colorado College Tigers football team was an American football team that represented Colorado College as a member of the Rocky Mountain Conference (RMC) during the 1930 college football season. In its fifth year under head coach William T. Van de Graaff, the team compiled an overall record of 2–4–2 with an identical mark in conference play, placing ninth in the RMC.

== Schedule ==
Date	Opponent	Site	Result	Source
October 4	Utah State	Washburn Field; Colorado Springs, CO	L 7–8	
October 11	Western State (CO)	Washburn Field; Colorado Springs, CO	W 45–7	
October 18	at Denver	DU Stadium; Denver, CO	L 0–6	
November 1	Colorado	Washburn Field; Colorado Springs, CO	L 13–14	
November 8	at Utah	Ute Stadium; Salt Lake City, UT	L 6–41	
November 15	Colorado Teachers	Washburn Field; Colorado Springs, CO	T 7–7	
November 22	at Colorado Agricultural	Colorado Field; Fort Collins, CO	T 0–0	
November 27	vs. Colorado Mines	Centennial Athletic Field; Pueblo, CO	W 7–6	
