= 1936 Wyoming Cowboys football team =

American college football season

1936 Wyoming Cowboys football
- Conference: Rocky Mountain Conference
- Record: 2–5–1 (2–4–1 RMC)
- Head coach: Willard Witte (4th season)
- Captain: None
- Home stadium: Corbett Field

1936 Rocky Mountain Conference football standings
	Conf.					Overall
Team	W		L		T	W		L		T
Utah State $	6	–	0	–	1	7	–	0	–	1
Denver	6	–	1	–	1	7	–	1	–	1
Utah	5	–	2	–	0	6	–	3	–	0
Colorado	4	–	2	–	0	4	–	3	–	0
Colorado State–Greeley	4	–	3	–	0	5	–	4	–	0
BYU	4	–	4	–	0	4	–	5	–	0
Colorado A&M	3	–	4	–	1	4	–	4	–	1
Colorado College	3	–	4	–	0	3	–	4	–	1
Wyoming	2	–	4	–	1	2	–	5	–	1
Montana State	1	–	4	–	0	3	–	5	–	0
Western State (CO)	1	–	5	–	0	1	–	6	–	0
Colorado Mines	0	–	6	–	0	2	–	6	–	0
$ – Conference champion

The 1936 Wyoming Cowboys football team was an American football team that represented the University of Wyoming as a member of the Rocky Mountain Conference (RMC) during the 1936 college football season. In their fourth season under head coach Willard Witte, the Cowboys compiled a 2–5–1 record (2–4–1 against conference opponents), finished ninth in the RMC, and were outscored by a total of 159 to 74.

== Schedule ==
Date	Opponent	Site	Result	Attendance	Source
October 2	at Colorado State–Greeley	Jackson Field; Greeley, CO	L 7–13		
October 10	Utah State	Corbett Field; Laramie, WY (rivalry)	L 0–25		
October 17	Colorado A&M	Corbett Field; Laramie, WY (rivalry)	T 0–0		
October 24	at Denver	Denver University Stadium; Denver, CO	L 14–25		
October 31	Colorado Mines	Corbett Field; Laramie, WY	W 27–0		
November 7	Montana State	Corbett Field; Laramie, WY	W 19–6	2,000	
November 21	at BYU	Provo, UT	L 7–32		
November 28	vs. Arizona*	Montgomery Stadium; Phoenix, AZ	L 0–58		
*Non-conference game
