= 1930 Utah Utes football team =

American college football season

1930 Utah Utes football

RMC champion
- Conference: Rocky Mountain Conference
- Record: 8–0 (7–0 RMC)
- Head coach: Ike Armstrong (6th season)
- Captain: Ray Price
- Home stadium: Ute Stadium

1930 Rocky Mountain Conference football standings
	Conf.					Overall
Team	W		L		T	W		L		T
Utah $	7	–	0	–	0	8	–	0	–	0
Colorado	5	–	1	–	1	6	–	1	–	1
BYU	4	–	1	–	1	5	–	2	–	4
Denver	4	–	3	–	0	5	–	4	–	0
Colorado Agricultural	3	–	3	–	1	3	–	5	–	1
Montana State	1	–	1	–	0	6	–	3	–	0
Colorado Teachers	2	–	2	–	3	2	–	2	–	3
Utah State	3	–	4	–	1	3	–	5	–	1
Colorado College	2	–	4	–	2	2	–	4	–	2
Colorado Mines	1	–	4	–	0	1	–	5	–	0
Wyoming	1	–	5	–	1	2	–	5	–	1
Western State (CO)	0	–	5	–	0	0	–	6	–	0
$ – Conference champion

The 1930 Utah Utes football team was an American football team that represented the University of Utah as a member of the Rocky Mountain Conference (RMC) during the 1930 college football season. In their sixth year under head coach Ike Armstrong, the Utes compiled an overall record of 8–0 record with a mark of 7–0 in conference play, won their third consecutive RMC championship, shut out five of eight opponents, and outscored all opponents by a total of 340 to 20. The team's average of 42.5 points per game was a school record for more than 70 years until 2004. The total winning margin of 320 points remains a school record.

Ray Price was the team captain. Three Utah players received recognition on the 1930 All-America team: center Marvin Jonas (2nd team, Consolidated Press); end George Watkins (2nd team, Allen J. Gould); and sophomore fullback Frank Christensen (3rd team, INS). Christen scored 98 points, setting a school scoring record that lasted until 1989.

== Schedule ==
Date	Opponent	Site	Result	Attendance	Source
September 27	at Nevada*	Mackay Field; Reno, NV	W 20–7	4,800	
October 4	Wyoming	Ute Stadium; Salt Lake City, UT	W 72–0	8,000	
October 18	BYU	Ute Stadium; Salt Lake City, UT (rivalry)	W 34–7	11,000	
October 25	Denver	Ute Stadium; Salt Lake City, UT	W 59–0	7,000	
November 1	at Colorado Agricultural	Colorado Field; Fort Collins, CO	W 39–0		
November 8	Colorado College^{†}	Ute Stadium; Salt Lake City, UT	W 41–6		
November 15	at Colorado	Colorado Stadium; Boulder, CO (rivalry)	W 34–0	15,000	
November 27	Utah State	Ute Stadium; Salt Lake City, UT (rivalry)	W 41–0	8,000	
*Non-conference game; ^{†}Homecoming
