= 1933 Colorado Silver and Gold football team =

American college football season

1933 Colorado Silver and Gold football
- Conference: Rocky Mountain Conference
- Record: 7–2 (5–2 RMC)
- Head coach: Bill Saunders (2nd season)
- Captain: Game captains
- Home stadium: Colorado Stadium

1933 Rocky Mountain Conference football standings
	Conf.					Overall
Team	W		L		T	W		L		T
Utah +	5	–	1	–	0	5	–	3	–	0
Colorado Agricultural +	5	–	1	–	1	5	–	1	–	1
Denver +	5	–	1	–	1	5	–	3	–	1
Colorado	5	–	2	–	0	7	–	2	–	0
BYU	5	–	3	–	0	5	–	4	–	0
Utah State	4	–	3	–	0	4	–	4	–	0
Colorado Teachers	3	–	3	–	0	4	–	3	–	0
Colorado College	2	–	4	–	1	2	–	5	–	1
Montana State	1	–	3	–	0	2	–	5	–	0
Colorado Mines	1	–	5	–	0	1	–	5	–	0
Wyoming	1	–	6	–	1	2	–	6	–	1
Western State (CO)	0	–	5	–	0	0	–	5	–	0
+ – Conference co-champions

The 1933 Colorado Silver and Gold football team was an American football team that represented the University of Colorado as a member of the Rocky Mountain Conference (RMC) during the 1933 college football season. Led by second-year head coach Head coach Bill Saunders, Colorado compiled an overall record of 7–2 with an mark of 5–2 in conference play, placing fourth in the RMC.

== Schedule ==
Date	Opponent	Site	Result	Attendance	Source
September 30	Chadron State*	Colorado Stadium; Boulder, CO	W 19–0		
October 6	at Oklahoma A&M*	Lewis Field; Stillwater, OK	W 6–0		
October 14	Colorado Mines	Colorado Stadium; Boulder, CO	W 42–0		
October 21	at Colorado Agricultural	Colorado Field; Fort Collins, CO (rivalry)	L 6–19		
October 28	Wyoming	Colorado Stadium; Boulder, CO	W 40–12		
November 4	Colorado College^{†}	Colorado Stadium; Boulder, CO	W 26–0		
November 11	at Utah	Robert Rice Stadium; Salt Lake City, UT (rivalry)	L 6–13		
November 17	Colorado Teachers	Colorado Stadium; Boulder, CO	W 24–0		
November 30	at Denver	Hilltop Stadium; Denver, CO	W 14–7	20,000	
*Non-conference game; ^{†}Homecoming
