= 1930 BYU Cougars football team =

American college football season

1930 BYU Cougars football
- Conference: Rocky Mountain Conference
- Record: 5–2–4 (4–1–1 RMC)
- Head coach: G. Ott Romney (3rd season)
- Home stadium: BYU Stadium

1930 Rocky Mountain Conference football standings
	Conf.					Overall
Team	W		L		T	W		L		T
Utah $	7	–	0	–	0	8	–	0	–	0
Colorado	5	–	1	–	1	6	–	1	–	1
BYU	4	–	1	–	1	5	–	2	–	4
Denver	4	–	3	–	0	5	–	4	–	0
Colorado Agricultural	3	–	3	–	1	3	–	5	–	1
Montana State	1	–	1	–	0	6	–	3	–	0
Colorado Teachers	2	–	2	–	3	2	–	2	–	3
Utah State	3	–	4	–	1	3	–	5	–	1
Colorado College	2	–	4	–	2	2	–	4	–	2
Wyoming	1	–	5	–	1	2	–	5	–	1
Colorado Mines	1	–	4	–	0	1	–	5	–	0
Western State (CO)	0	–	5	–	0	0	–	6	–	0
$ – Conference champion

The 1930 BYU Cougars football team was an American football team that represented Brigham Young University (BYU) as a member of the Rocky Mountain Conference (RMC) during the 1930 college football season. In their third season under head coach G. Ott Romney, the Cougars compiled an overall record of 5–2–4 with a mark of 4–1–1 against conference opponents, finished third in the RMC, and outscored opponents by a total of 179 to 160.

== Schedule ==
Date	Opponent	Site	Result	Attendance	Source
September 27	Wyoming	Campus athletic grounds; Laramie, WY	W 19–12		
October 4	Nevada*	BYU Stadium; Provo, UT	T 6–6		
October 11	at Colorado Teachers	Jackson field; Greeley, CO	T 7–7		
October 18	at Utah	Ute Stadium; Salt Lake City, UT (rivalry)	L 7–24	11,000	
October 25	at Western State (CO)	Gunnison, CO	W 25–0		
November 1	vs. Utah State	Ogden Stadium; Ogden, UT (rivalry)	W 39–14	7,000	
November 8	vs. Mount St. Charles*	Clark park; Butte, MT	T 13–13		
November 15	Montana State^{†}	BYU Stadium; Provo, UT	W 19–6	2,500	
November 22	at Regis*	Denver, CO	W 18–6	3,000	
November 27	at College of Idaho*	Boise, ID	T 13–13		
December 10	at Hawaii*	Honolulu Stadium; Honolulu, Territory of Hawaii	L 13–49	10,000	
*Non-conference game; ^{†}Homecoming
