= 1930 Wyoming Cowboys football team =

American college football season

1930 Wyoming Cowboys football
- Conference: Rocky Mountain Conference
- Record: 2–5–1 (1–5–1 RMC)
- Head coach: John Rhodes (1st season)
- Captain: None
- Home stadium: Campus athletic grounds

1930 Rocky Mountain Conference football standings
	Conf.					Overall
Team	W		L		T	W		L		T
Utah $	7	–	0	–	0	8	–	0	–	0
Colorado	5	–	1	–	1	6	–	1	–	1
BYU	4	–	1	–	1	5	–	2	–	4
Denver	4	–	3	–	0	5	–	4	–	0
Colorado Agricultural	3	–	3	–	1	3	–	5	–	1
Montana State	1	–	1	–	0	6	–	3	–	0
Colorado Teachers	2	–	2	–	3	2	–	2	–	3
Utah State	3	–	4	–	1	3	–	5	–	1
Colorado College	2	–	4	–	2	2	–	4	–	2
Colorado Mines	1	–	4	–	0	1	–	5	–	0
Wyoming	1	–	5	–	1	2	–	5	–	1
Western State (CO)	0	–	5	–	0	0	–	6	–	0
$ – Conference champion

The 1930 Wyoming Cowboys football team was an American football team that represented the University of Wyoming as a member of the Rocky Mountain Conference (RMC) during the 1930 college football season. In their first season under head coach John Rhodes, the Cowboys compiled a 2–5–1 record (1–5–1 against conference opponents), finished 11th in the RMC, and were outscored by a total of 161 to 86.

== Schedule ==
Date	Opponent	Site	Result	Source
September 27	BYU	Campus athletic grounds; Laramie, WY	L 12–19	
October 4	at Utah	Ute Stadium; Salt Lake City, UT	L 0–72	
October 11	Montana State	Campus athletic grounds; Laramie, WY	L 13–20	
October 25	at Utah State	Aggie Stadium; Logan, UT (rivalry)	L 8–13	
November 1	Colorado Teachers	Campus athletic grounds; Laramie, WY	T 6–6	
November 8	at Colorado Agricultural	Colorado Field; Fort Collins, CO (rivalry)	W 21–6	
November 15	at Denver	DU Stadium; Denver, CO	L 7–19	
November 29	at New Mexico*	University Field; Albuquerque, NM	W 19–6	
*Non-conference game
