= 1933 Montana State Bobcats football team =

American college football season

1933 Montana State Bobcats football
- Conference: Rocky Mountain Conference
- Record: 2–5 (1–3 RMC)
- Head coach: Schubert R. Dyche (6th season)
- Home stadium: Gatton Field

1933 Rocky Mountain Conference football standings
	Conf.					Overall
Team	W		L		T	W		L		T
Utah +	5	–	1	–	0	5	–	3	–	0
Colorado Agricultural +	5	–	1	–	1	5	–	1	–	1
Denver +	5	–	1	–	1	5	–	3	–	1
Colorado	5	–	2	–	0	7	–	2	–	0
BYU	5	–	3	–	0	5	–	4	–	0
Utah State	4	–	3	–	0	4	–	4	–	0
Colorado Teachers	3	–	3	–	0	4	–	3	–	0
Colorado College	2	–	4	–	1	2	–	5	–	1
Montana State	1	–	3	–	0	2	–	5	–	0
Colorado Mines	1	–	5	–	0	1	–	5	–	0
Wyoming	1	–	6	–	1	2	–	6	–	1
Western State (CO)	0	–	5	–	0	0	–	5	–	0
+ – Conference co-champions

The 1933 Montana State Bobcats football team was an American football team that represented Montana State College (later renamed Montana State University) in the Rocky Mountain Conference (RMC) during the 1933 college football season. In their sixth season under head coach Schubert R. Dyche, the Bobcats compiled a 2–5 record (1–3 against RMC opponents), finished in ninth place out of 12 teams in the RMC, and were outscored by a total of 171 to 38.

== Schedule ==
Date	Opponent	Site	Result	Attendance	Source
September 23	at Utah	Ute Stadium; Salt Lake City, UT	L 0–61	8,000	
September 30	at BYU	Provo, UT	L 0–25	6,000	
October 7	Utah State	Gatton Field; Bozeman, MT	L 0–40		
October 14	at Wyoming	Corbett Field; Laramie, WY	W 7–0		
October 22	vs. Montana*	Clark Park; Butte, MT (rivalry)	L 0–32	5,500	
October 28	Montana Mines*	Gatton Field; Bozeman, MT	W 19–0		
November 11	at Idaho Southern Branch*	Hutchinson Field; Pocatello, ID	L 6–13	4,000	
*Non-conference game
