= 1955 Western State Mountaineers football team =

American college football season

1955 Western State Mountaineers football
- Conference: Rocky Mountain Conference
- Record: 7–3 (6–2 RMC)
- Head coach: Pete Pederson (3rd season)

1955 Rocky Mountain Conference football standings
	Conf.					Overall
Team	W		L		T	W		L		T
Idaho State $	6	–	0	–	0	8	–	1	–	0
Western State (CO)	6	–	2	–	0	7	–	3	–	0
Montana State	3	–	2	–	1	4	–	4	–	1
Colorado Mines	2	–	4	–	2	2	–	5	–	2
Colorado College	2	–	6	–	0	3	–	7	–	0
Colorado State–Greeley	1	–	6	–	1	1	–	7	–	1
$ – Conference champion

The 1955 Western State Mountaineers football team was an American football team that represented Western State College of Colorado—now known as Western Colorado University—as a member of the Rocky Mountain Conference (RMC) during the 1955 college football season. Led by third-year head coach Pete Pederson, the Mountaineers compiled an overall record of 7–3 with a mark of 6–2 in conference play, placing second in the RMC.

Western State halfback Bill Rhodes ranked second nationally among small college rushing leaders. He totaled 1,112 rushing yards on 142 carries in 10 games. He also ranked fifth nationally with 1,153 yards of total offense and 13 nationally in punting with an average of 39.0 yards per punt.

Rhodes was also a unanimous pick on the Associated Press (AP) Rocky Mountain Conference all-star team. Quarterback Bob Mears also received first-team honors. End Dick Mikkelsen and center Sam Boyd received second-team honors. Rhodes also received second-team honors from the AP on its Little All-America team.

== Schedule ==
Date	Time	Opponent	Site	Result	Attendance	Source
September 17		Cal Poly*	Gunnison, CO	L 18–40		
September 23		at Colorado State–Greeley	Greeley, CO	W 13–7		
October 1	2:30 p.m.	Colorado College^{†}	Gunnison, CO	W 38–7	5,000	
October 8		at Colorado Mines	Golden, CO	W 18–13		
October 15	2:30 p.m.	at Idaho State	Spud Bowl; Pocatello, ID	L 6–14	5,000	
October 22		Montana State	Gunnison, CO	L 6–20		
October 29		at Colorado College	Colorado Springs, CO	W 48–13		
November 5		Colorado State–Greeley	Gunnison, CO	W 48–7		
November 11	2:00 p.m.	vs. Colorado Mines	Delta High School Stadium; Delta, CO (Uranium Bowl)	W 24–6	3,500	
November 19		at Adams State*	Alamosa, CO (Spud Bowl)	W 27–6		
*Non-conference game; ^{†}Homecoming; All times are in Mountain time
