= Darden Field =

Baseball stadium at Colorado School of Mines

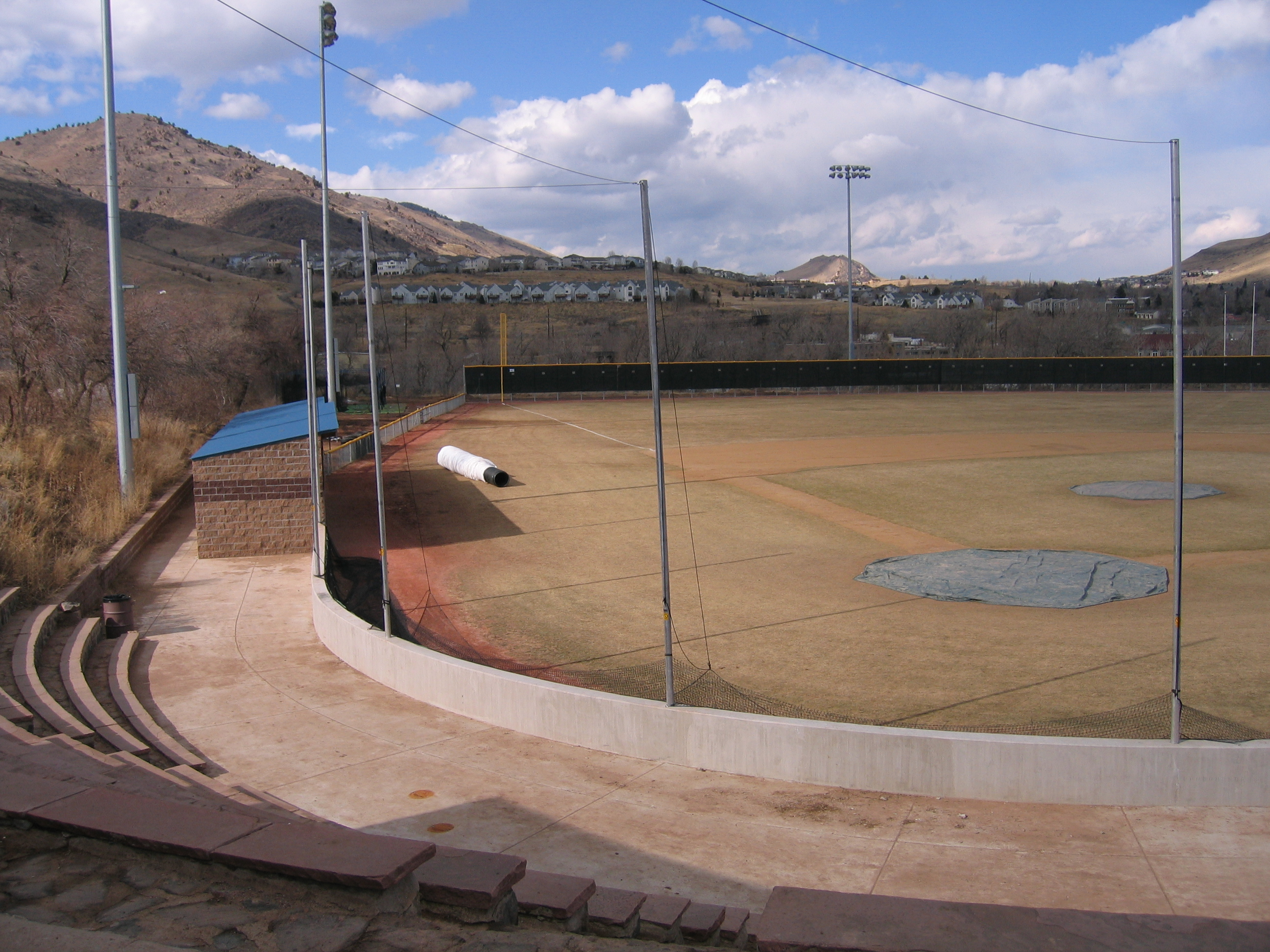
- Former names: CSM Baseball Field
- Location: Golden, Colorado
- Owner: Colorado School of Mines
- Operator: Colorado School of Mines
- Capacity: 500
- Surface: Natural grass

Construction
- Groundbreaking: 1937
- Opened: 1937

Tenant
- Colorado School of Mines Orediggers (1937-present)

Darden Field is a historic baseball stadium that has been home to the Colorado School of Mines baseball teams since it was constructed in 1937. Featuring fieldstone stands with flagstone benches built into the hillside, the park was originally a Depression-era project of the Public Works Administration. Aside from hosting collegiate baseball, the diamond has also hosted notable visitors including pitcher Satchel Paige. Also notable were the poor conditions of the infield, as evidence among the players referring to bad hops as “the ghost of Jimmy Darden”. After renovations which substantially modernized the stadium in 2007, the park was renamed Darden Field after the longtime baseball coach Jim Darden (1954-1992).
