= 1936 Montana State Bobcats football team =

American college football season

1936 Montana State Bobcats football
- Conference: Rocky Mountain Conference
- Record: 3–5 (1–4 RMC)
- Head coach: Jack Croft (1st season)
- Captain: Bill Stebbins
- Home stadium: Gatton Field

1936 Rocky Mountain Conference football standings
	Conf.					Overall
Team	W		L		T	W		L		T
Utah State $	6	–	0	–	1	7	–	0	–	1
Denver	6	–	1	–	1	7	–	1	–	1
Utah	5	–	2	–	0	6	–	3	–	0
Colorado	4	–	2	–	0	4	–	3	–	0
Colorado State–Greeley	4	–	3	–	0	5	–	4	–	0
BYU	4	–	4	–	0	4	–	5	–	0
Colorado A&M	3	–	4	–	1	4	–	4	–	1
Colorado College	3	–	4	–	0	3	–	4	–	1
Wyoming	2	–	4	–	1	2	–	5	–	1
Montana State	1	–	4	–	0	3	–	5	–	0
Western State (CO)	1	–	5	–	0	1	–	6	–	0
Colorado Mines	0	–	6	–	0	2	–	6	–	0
$ – Conference champion

The 1936 Montana State Bobcats football team was an American football team that represented Montana State College (later renamed Montana State University) in the Rocky Mountain Conference (RMC) during the 1936 college football season. In its first season under head coach Jack Croft, the team compiled a 3–5 record (1–4 against RMC opponents) and was outscored by a total of 119 to 70. Bill Stebbins was the team captain, and Alan Oliver won the most valuable player award.

== Schedule ==
Date	Opponent	Site	Result	Attendance	Source
September 26	at Utah State	Aggie Stadium; Logan, UT	L 0–12		
October 3	at BYU	Provo, UT	L 0–19		
October 10	Colorado College^{†}	Gatton Field; Bozeman, MT	W 6–3		
October 17	Colorado State–Greeley	Gatton Field; Bozeman, MT	L 0–13		
October 24	vs. Montana*	Clark Park; Butte, MT (rivalry)	L 0–27		
November 7	at Wyoming	Corbett Field; Laramie, WY	L 6–19	2,000	
November 11	at Idaho Southern Branch*	Spud Bowl; Pocatello, ID	W 32–19		
November 26	at Montana Mines*	Clark Park; Butte, MT	W 26–7		
*Non-conference game; ^{†}Homecoming
