= 1936 Colorado A&M Aggies football team =

American college football season

1936 Colorado A&M Aggies football
- Conference: Rocky Mountain Conference
- Record: 4–4–1 (3–4–1 RMC)
- Head coach: Harry W. Hughes (26th season)
- Home stadium: Colorado Field

1936 Rocky Mountain Conference football standings
	Conf.					Overall
Team	W		L		T	W		L		T
Utah State $	6	–	0	–	1	7	–	0	–	1
Denver	6	–	1	–	1	7	–	1	–	1
Utah	5	–	2	–	0	6	–	3	–	0
Colorado	4	–	2	–	0	4	–	3	–	0
Colorado State–Greeley	4	–	3	–	0	5	–	4	–	0
BYU	4	–	4	–	0	4	–	5	–	0
Colorado A&M	3	–	4	–	1	4	–	4	–	1
Colorado College	3	–	4	–	0	3	–	4	–	1
Wyoming	2	–	4	–	1	2	–	5	–	1
Montana State	1	–	4	–	0	3	–	5	–	0
Western State (CO)	1	–	5	–	0	1	–	6	–	0
Colorado Mines	0	–	6	–	0	2	–	6	–	0
$ – Conference champion

The 1936 Colorado A&M Aggies football team represented Colorado A&M (now Colorado State University) in the Rocky Mountain Conference (RMC) during the 1936 college football season. In their 26th season, under head coach Harry W. Hughes, the Aggies posted a 4–4–1 record (3–4–1 against RMC opponents), tied for seventh in the RMC, and were outscored by a total of 74 to 67.

== Schedule ==
Date	Opponent	Site	Result	Attendance	Source
September 26	Western State (CO)	Colorado Field; Fort Collins, CO	W 13–0		
October 3	New Mexico*	Colorado Field; Fort Collins, CO	W 9–7		
October 10	at Denver	Denver University Stadium; Denver, CO	L 7–14	14,000	
October 17	at Wyoming	Corbett Field; Laramie, WY(rivalry)	T 0–0		
October 24	Colorado	Colorado Field; Fort Collins, CO (rivalry)	L 7–9		
November 7	Utah State	Colorado Field; Fort Collins, CO	L 0–13		
November 14	at Colorado State–Greeley	Jackson Field; Greeley, CO	W 12–6		
November 21	Colorado College	Colorado Field; Fort Collins, CO	W 19–12		
November 26	at Utah	Ute Stadium; Salt Lake City, UT	L 0–13	14,000	
*Non-conference game
