= 1930 Colorado Silver and Gold football team =

American college football season

1930 Colorado Silver and Gold football
- Conference: Rocky Mountain Conference
- Record: 6–1–1 (5–1–1 RMC)
- Head coach: Myron E. Witham (11th season)
- Captain: Bernie Buster
- Home stadium: Colorado Stadium

1930 Rocky Mountain Conference football standings
	Conf.					Overall
Team	W		L		T	W		L		T
Utah $	7	–	0	–	0	8	–	0	–	0
Colorado	5	–	1	–	1	6	–	1	–	1
BYU	4	–	1	–	1	5	–	2	–	4
Denver	4	–	3	–	0	5	–	4	–	0
Colorado Agricultural	3	–	3	–	1	3	–	5	–	1
Montana State	1	–	1	–	0	6	–	3	–	0
Colorado Teachers	2	–	2	–	3	2	–	2	–	3
Utah State	3	–	4	–	1	3	–	5	–	1
Colorado College	2	–	4	–	2	2	–	4	–	2
Wyoming	1	–	5	–	1	2	–	5	–	1
Colorado Mines	1	–	4	–	0	1	–	5	–	0
Western State (CO)	0	–	5	–	0	0	–	6	–	0
$ – Conference champion

The 1930 Colorado Silver and Gold football team was an American football team that represented the University of Colorado as a member of the Rocky Mountain Conference (RMC) during the 1930 college football season. Led by 11th-year head coach Myron E. Witham, Colorado compiled an overall record of 6–1–1 with a mark of 5–1–1 in conference play, placing second in the RMC.

== Schedule ==
Date	Opponent	Site	Result	Attendance	Source
October 4	at Missouri*	Memorial Stadium; Columbia, MO	W 9–0	6,000	
October 11	at Utah State	Aggie Stadium; Logan, UT	T 0–0	8,000	
October 18	Colorado Mines	Colorado Stadium; Boulder, CO	W 36–7		
October 25	Colorado Agricultural^{†}	Colorado Stadium; Boulder, CO (rivalry)	W 7–0		
November 1	at Colorado College	Washburn Field; Colorado Springs, CO	W 14–13		
November 8	at Colorado Teachers	Greeley, CO	W 27–7		
November 15	Utah	Colorado Stadium; Boulder, CO (rivalry)	L 0–34	15,000	
November 27	at Denver	Hilltop Stadium; Denver, CO	W 27–7	25,000	
*Non-conference game; ^{†}Homecoming
