= 1933 Utah Utes football team =

American college football season

1933 Utah Utes football

RMC co-champion
- Conference: Rocky Mountain Conference
- Record: 5–3 (5–1 RMC)
- Head coach: Ike Armstrong (9th season)
- Captain: Harold Davies
- Home stadium: Ute Stadium

1933 Rocky Mountain Conference football standings
	Conf.					Overall
Team	W		L		T	W		L		T
Colorado Agricultural +	5	–	1	–	1	5	–	1	–	1
Utah +	5	–	1	–	0	5	–	3	–	0
Denver +	5	–	1	–	1	5	–	3	–	1
Colorado	5	–	2	–	0	7	–	2	–	0
BYU	5	–	3	–	0	5	–	4	–	0
Utah State	4	–	3	–	0	4	–	4	–	0
Colorado Teachers	3	–	3	–	0	4	–	3	–	0
Colorado College	2	–	4	–	1	2	–	5	–	1
Montana State	1	–	3	–	0	2	–	5	–	0
Colorado Mines	1	–	5	–	0	1	–	5	–	0
Wyoming	1	–	6	–	1	2	–	6	–	1
Western State (CO)	0	–	5	–	0	0	–	5	–	0
+ – Conference co-champions

The 1933 Utah Utes football team was an American football team that represented the University of Utah as a member of the Rocky Mountain Conference (RMC) during the 1933 college football season. In their ninth season under head coach Ike Armstrong, the Utes compiled an overall record of 5–3 with a mark of 5–1 in conference play, shared the RMC title with Colorado Agricultural and Denver, and outscored opponents by a total of 129 to 78.

Before losing to Denver on November 18, Utah had won 30 consecutive conference games dating back to the 1928 season and had not lost a conference game or any game played in the Rocky Mountain region since the 1927 season.

== Schedule ==
Date	Opponent	Site	Result	Attendance	Source
September 23	Montana State	Ute Stadium; Salt Lake City, UT	W 61–0	8,000	
October 6	at UCLA*	Los Angeles Memorial Coliseum; Los Angeles, CA	L 0–21	15,000	
October 14	BYU	Ute Stadium; Salt Lake City, UT (rivalry)	W 21–6	15,000	
October 28	Utah State	Ute Stadium; Salt Lake City, UT (rivalry)	W 14–6		
November 4	at Oregon*	Hayward Field; Eugene, OR	L 7–26		
November 11	Colorado^{†}	Ute Stadium; Salt Lake City, UT (rivalry)	W 13–6		
November 18	at Denver	DU Stadium; Denver, CO	L 0–13	17,000	
November 30	Colorado Agricultural	Ute Stadium; Salt Lake City, UT	W 13–0		
*Non-conference game; ^{†}Homecoming
