= 1936 Colorado Buffaloes football team =

American college football season

1936 Colorado Buffaloes football
- Conference: Rocky Mountain Conference
- Record: 4–3 (4–2 RMC)
- Head coach: Bunny Oakes (2nd season)
- Captain: Game captains
- Home stadium: Colorado Stadium

1936 Rocky Mountain Conference football standings
	Conf.					Overall
Team	W		L		T	W		L		T
Utah State $	6	–	0	–	1	7	–	0	–	1
Denver	6	–	1	–	1	7	–	1	–	1
Utah	5	–	2	–	0	6	–	3	–	0
Colorado	4	–	2	–	0	4	–	3	–	0
Colorado State–Greeley	4	–	3	–	0	5	–	4	–	0
BYU	4	–	4	–	0	4	–	5	–	0
Colorado A&M	3	–	4	–	1	4	–	4	–	1
Colorado College	3	–	4	–	0	3	–	4	–	1
Wyoming	2	–	4	–	1	2	–	5	–	1
Montana State	1	–	4	–	0	3	–	5	–	0
Western State (CO)	1	–	5	–	0	1	–	6	–	0
Colorado Mines	0	–	6	–	0	2	–	6	–	0
$ – Conference champion

The 1936 Colorado Buffaloes football team was an American football team that represented the University of Colorado as a member of the Rocky Mountain Conference (RMC) during the 1936 college football season. Led by second-year head coach Bunny Oakes, Colorado compiled an overall record of 4–3 with a mark of 4–2 in conference play, placing fourth in the RMC.

== Schedule ==
Date	Opponent	Site	Result	Attendance	Source
October 3	Oklahoma*	Colorado Stadium; Boulder, CO	L 0–8		
October 17	Colorado Mines	Colorado Stadium; Boulder, CO	W 33–0		
October 24	at Colorado A&M	Colorado Field; Fort Collins, CO (rivalry)	W 9–7		
October 31	at Colorado College	Washburn Field; Colorado Springs, CO	W 7–0		
November 7	Utah^{†}	Colorado Stadium; Boulder, CO (rivalry)	W 31–7	6,000	
November 14	at Utah State	Aggie Stadium; Logan, UT	L 13–14	11,000	
November 26	at Denver	Hilltop Stadium; Denver, CO	L 6–7	27,770	
*Non-conference game; ^{†}Homecoming
