= Alumni Field (Colorado School of Mines) =

Stadium in Golden, Colorado, U.S.

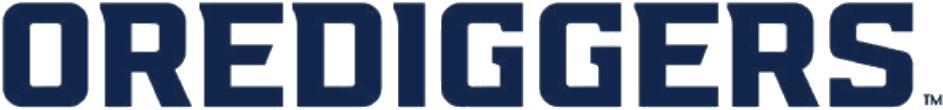

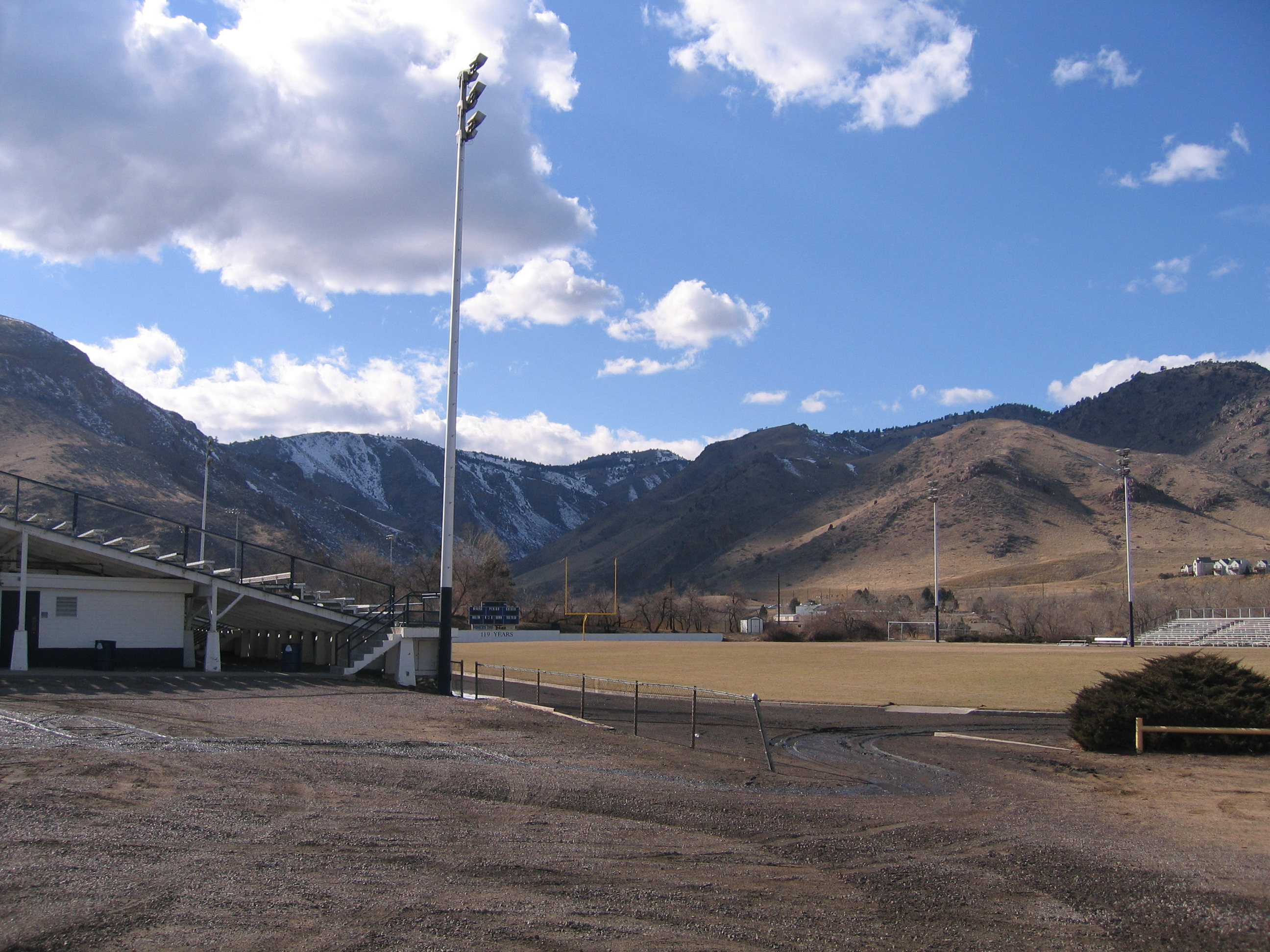
- View of the stadium in 2008
- Interactive map of Alumni Field
- Full name: Alumni Field at Marv Kay Stadium
- Former names: Athletic Park (1893–1922), Brooks Field (1922–2010), Campbell Field (2010–2022)
- Location: Golden, Colorado
- Coordinates: 39°45′11″N 105°13′39″W
- Owner: Colorado School of Mines
- Operator: Colorado School of Mines
- Capacity: 4,000
- Surface: Turf

Construction
- Groundbreaking: February 1893
- Opened: May 20, 1893; 133 years ago
- Architect: William "Cement Bill" Williams (1922–24 grandstands)

Tenants
- Colorado School of Mines Orediggers (1893–present); Colorado Summit (2022–present)

Website
- minesathletics.com/alumni-field

Alumni Field, officially Alumni Field at Marv Kay Stadium, is an American college football stadium located in Golden, Colorado. The stadium serves as the home field of the Colorado Mines Orediggers football team representing the Colorado School of Mines. Alumni Field is one of the oldest football fields in existence, the oldest west of the Mississippi River and the oldest in NCAA Division II. Originally it was a dirt surface all-purpose athletic field in exactly its current configuration, built within a clay pit, a fitting mined-out home for the Orediggers.

Its first athletic contest, held on May 20, 1893, was the first annual Colorado Inter-Collegiate Athletic Association Field Day, featuring many athletic contests between the University of Colorado, Colorado A&M, Colorado School of Mines, and the University of Denver, in which Mines claimed the most medals. Its first football game took place on October 7, 1893, a 6-0 Mines victory over the University of Denver. It has been home to the football Orediggers through all but the first five seasons of their existence (their previous home were the now-destroyed grounds at the southeast corner of 19th and Illinois streets in Golden), and has been renovated several times throughout its existence. The field was originally called Athletic Park, renamed Brooks Field after Mines trustee and benefactor Ralph D. Brooks in 1922. It was renamed Campbell Field after 1939 undefeated team member and benefactor Harry D. Campbell in 2010, and finally named Alumni Field in 2022. Alumni Field is the oldest football field in the west, the oldest in NCAA Division II football, the 5th oldest college football field in the nation and 3rd oldest in its original configuration.

== Renovations ==
Historic photographs show Brooks Field as originally a dirt surface, without grandstands and surrounded by a board fence. Despite such conditions it is known to have hosted crowds of spectators of over 1,000, who highly likely used nearby slopes to view games from. The first set of wooden grandstands was built on the south side of the field in 1897 with a clubhouse underneath for use of the football team. In 1922 and 1924 the second set of grandstands were built by noted local builder William "Cement Bill" Williams. This featured wooden bench seats upon a steel superstructure, with home and visiting locker rooms, public restrooms and refreshment stand beneath. In 1922 the dirt surface was converted to natural grass, part of which was scraped back to dirt surface for a baseball diamond during season each year.

Originally home also to the CSM baseball team, it became a primarily football facility in 1937 after baseball was moved to Darden Field just to the west. During the 1930s a Federal Emergency Relief Administration project scooped out the slopes at the west side of Brooks Field to make room to construct a track around the surface. In 1948 steel bleachers comprising the north grandstands were built, adding 1,800 to the stadium's capacity, primarily for use by visiting spectators. In 1988 the grandstands were renovated to cover most wooden benches with metal surfaces and create a central concourse, along with steps down to the field level. In 2010, the field was converted to its third surface, synthetic turf. In 2014-2015 the venue's third set of grandstands were built, featuring the full service Korell Athletic Center, brick and steel structure, steel tread seating capable of fan generated noise and more. In 2022, the artificial turf was upgraded and the facility is renamed Alumni Field at Marv Kay Stadium. The McKee West End Zone, opened in 2023 upon the slope historically used by spectators, formally added seating, a beer garden, and fan circulation improvements, with its own refreshment stand added in 2025.

== Notable events ==
Alumni Field has hosted many notable athletes and teams over its many years of play. Although missing out on the legendary 103–0 victory of the Orediggers over the University of Colorado in 1890 as well as their first Colorado Football Association championship in 1891, it has hosted 19 championship football teams, making it possibly the only football field in the world to be home to champions in three centuries (19th-21st), and more:

- Alumni Field hosted the latter part of the Orediggers' 18-game football winning streak against collegiate teams that spanned from 1888 to 1894.
- The 3rd perfect and 4th unbeaten season of the football Orediggers took place here in its inaugural season in 1893 (5-0-0, CFA Champions).
- Alumni Field hosted the latter half of the football Orediggers' streak of 6 winning seasons from 1888 to 1894.
- CSM's earliest known football loss at Alumni Field took place in 1894 to the University of Colorado (a 20–0 shutout).
- The first live televised football game in the Rocky Mountain region took place here on November 1, 1952, a game between the Orediggers and Idaho State University.
- The first live nationally televised football game in the Rocky Mountain region took place here on November 15, 1952, a game between the Orediggers and Colorado College.
- The first football playoff game at Alumni Field took place on November 13, 2004, as the Orediggers beat Midwestern State University.

== Notable people ==
- Baltimore Colts (held training camp here in 1970)
- Leroy Taylor Brown, Olympic silver medalist, men's high jump, Paris 1924 (trained here as Mines graduate student prior to Olympics)
- Dutch Clark, Pro football hall of fame (football coach at Mines in 1933)
- Denver Broncos (held training camp here from 1960 to 1963)
- Colorado Rapids (played exhibition games here in 2002 and 2006 with first game against Calgary Storm)
- Chad Friehauf, 2004 Harlon Hill Trophy winner (Mines quarterback)
- Justin Dvorak (pronounced as written, descendant relative of Antonin Dvorak), 2016 Harlon Hill Trophy winner (Mines quarterback)
- John Matocha, 2022 Harlon Hill Trophy winner (Mines quarterback)
- Roy Hartzell, Major League Baseball utility player, St. Louis Browns, New York Highlanders/Yankees (played semipro ball for Golden Reds here)
- Albert E. Jones, Major League Baseball pitcher, Cleveland Spiders, St. Louis Perfectos/Cardinals (first native born Colorado MLB player, played here for as Mines student and semipro ball for Golden Reds)
- Jack Liddle, Olympic runner, Berlin 1936 (trained here as Mines student prior to Olympics)
- Jack Colahan, National Football League player, New York Yankees (played here as Mines student)
- Lloyd Madden, National Football League player, Chicago Cardinals (played here as Mines student)
- Mark Melancon, Major League Baseball pitcher, New York Yankees, Houston Astros, Boston Red Sox, Pittsburgh Pirates, Washington Nationals, San Francisco Giants, Atlanta Braves, San Diego Padres, Arizona Diamondbacks (played here as Golden High School football player)
- Elwood Romney, Brigham Young University hall of fame basketball player and All-American, cousin of Mitt Romney (coached freshman football 1936–1939)
