= List of Fresno State Bulldogs football seasons =

This is a list of seasons completed by the Fresno State Bulldogs football program since the team's conception in 1921. The list documents season-by-season records.

== Seasons ==
Conference champions *	Division champions †	Bowl game berth ^

Season	Head coach	Conference	Season results					Bowl result	Final ranking	
Season	Head coach	Conference	Conference finish	Division finish	Wins	Losses	Ties	Bowl result	AP poll	Coaches Poll
Fresno State Bulldogs
1921	Arthur W. Jones	Independent	N/A	N/A	4	4	0	—	N/A	N/A
1922 *	Arthur W. Jones	CCC	1st	N/A	7	1	2	—	N/A	N/A
1923 *	Arthur W. Jones	CCC	1st	N/A	7	2	0	—	N/A	N/A
1924	Arthur W. Jones	CCC	2nd	N/A	7	2	0	—	N/A	N/A
1925	Arthur W. Jones	FWC	5th	N/A	2	6	1	—	N/A	N/A
1926	Arthur W. Jones	FWC	3rd	N/A	5	3	1	—	N/A	N/A
1927	Arthur W. Jones	FWC	3rd	N/A	3	3	2	—	N/A	N/A
1928	Arthur W. Jones	FWC	5th	N/A	2	5	1	—	N/A	N/A
1929	Stanley Borleske	FWC	6th	N/A	1	7	0	—	N/A	N/A
1930 *	Stanley Borleske	FWC	1st	N/A	8	0	0	—	N/A	N/A
1931	Stanley Borleske	FWC	5th	N/A	4	6	0	—	N/A	N/A
1932	Stanley Borleske	FWC	6th	N/A	3	5	2	—	N/A	N/A
1933	Leo Harris	FWC	4th	N/A	5	4	0	—	N/A	N/A
1934 *	Leo Harris	FWC	T–1st	N/A	7	2	1	—	N/A	N/A
1935 *	Leo Harris	FWC	1st	N/A	6	3	0	—	N/A	N/A
1936	James Bradshaw	FWC	2nd	N/A	5	3	1	—	N/A	N/A
1937 *	James Bradshaw	FWC	1st	N/A	8	1	1	Won Charity Bowl against Arkansas State Bears 27–26 ^	N/A	N/A
1938	James Bradshaw	FWC	2nd	N/A	7	3	0	—	N/A	N/A
1939	James Bradshaw	CCAA	2nd	N/A	9	1	0	—	N/A	N/A
1940	James Bradshaw	CCAA	2nd	N/A	9	2	1	Won Pineapple Bowl against Hawaii Rainbow Warriors 20–0 ^	N/A	N/A
1941 *	James Bradshaw	CCAA	1st	N/A	4	3	2	—	N/A	N/A
1942	James Bradshaw	Independent		N/A	9	1	0	N/A (Note: Due to WWII, the CCAA was on hiatus and no conference games were played.)	N/A	N/A
1943	No team									
1944	Earl Wight	Independent	N/A	N/A	0	6	0	—	N/A	N/A
1945	Alvin Pierson	Independent	N/A	N/A	4	6	2	Lost Raisin Bowl to Drake Bulldogs 12–13 ^	N/A	N/A
1946	James Bradshaw	CCAA	2nd	N/A	8	4	0	—	N/A	N/A
1947	Ken Gleason	CCAA	3rd	N/A	3	6	2	—	N/A	N/A
1948	Ken Gleason	CCAA	4th	N/A	3	6	1	—	N/A	N/A
1949	Alvin Pierson	CCAA	4th	N/A	3	8	0	—	N/A	N/A
1950	Duke Jacobs	CCAA	4th	N/A	2	6	1	—	N/A	N/A
1951	Duke Jacobs	Independent	N/A	N/A	5	5	0	—	N/A	N/A
1952	Clark Van Galder	Independent	N/A	N/A	8	2	0	—	N/A	N/A
1953	Clark Van Galder	CCAA	3rd	N/A	4	4	2	—	N/A	N/A
1954 *	Clark Van Galder	CCAA	1st	N/A	7	3	0	—	N/A	N/A
1955 *	Clark Van Galder	CCAA	1st	N/A	9	1	0	—	N/A	N/A
1956 *	Clark Van Galder	CCAA	1st	N/A	8	2	0	—	N/A	N/A
1957	Clark Van Galder	CCAA	3rd	N/A	5	5	0	—	N/A	N/A
1958 *	Clark Van Galder	CCAA	T–1st	N/A	5	5	0	—	N/A	— (Note: The UPI small college football ratings started in 1958.)
1959 *	Cecil Coleman	CCAA	1st	N/A	7	3	0	—	N/A	—
1960 *	Cecil Coleman	CCAA	1st	N/A	9	1	0	—	— (Note: The AP small college football ratings started in 1960.)	9
1961 *	Cecil Coleman	CCAA	1st	N/A	10	0	0	Won Mercy Bowl against Bowling Green Falcons 36–6 ^	3	5
1962	Cecil Coleman	CCAA	2nd	N/A	7	3	0	—	8	7
1963	Cecil Coleman	CCAA	4th	N/A	4	6	0	—	—	—
1964	Phil Krueger	CCAA	T–3rd	N/A	4	6	0	—	—	—
1965	Phil Krueger	CCAA	4th	N/A	6	4	0	—	—	—
1966	Darryl Rogers	CCAA	2nd	N/A	7	3	0	—	—	—
1967	Darryl Rogers	CCAA	4th	N/A	3	8	0	—	—	—
1968 *	Darryl Rogers	CCAA	1st	N/A	7	4	0	Lost Camellia Bowl to Humboldt State Lumberjacks 14–29 ^	—	18
1969	Darryl Rogers	PCAA	6th	N/A	6	4	0	—	— (Note: By moving to the PCAA, Fresno State moved from the College Division to the University Division, making the university eligible for the University Division AP Poll.)	— (Note: By moving to the PCAA, Fresno State moved from the College Division to the University Division, making the university eligible for the University Division UPI Poll.)
1970	Darryl Rogers	PCAA	3rd	N/A	8	4	0	—	—	—
1971	Darryl Rogers	PCAA	3rd	N/A	6	5	0	—	—	—
1972	Darryl Rogers	PCAA	3rd	N/A	6	4	1	—	—	—
1973	J. R. Boone	PCAA	4th	N/A	2	9	0	—	—	—
1974	J. R. Boone	PCAA	5th	N/A	5	7	0	—	—	—
1975	J. R. Boone	PCAA	5th	N/A	3	8	0	—	—	—
1976	Jim Sweeney	PCAA	2nd	N/A	5	6	0	—	—	—
1977 *	Jim Sweeney	PCAA	1st	N/A	9	2	0	—	—	—
1978	Bob Padilla	PCAA	T–5th	N/A	3	8	0	—	—	—
1979	Bob Padilla	PCAA	4th	N/A	4	7	0	—	—	—
1980	Jim Sweeney	PCAA	T–4th	N/A	5	6	0	—	—	—
1981	Jim Sweeney	PCAA	T–3rd	N/A	5	6	0	—	—	—
1982 *	Jim Sweeney	PCAA	1st	N/A	11	1	0	Won California Bowl against Bowling Green Falcons 29–28 ^	—	—
1983	Jim Sweeney	PCAA	6th	N/A	6	5	0	—	—	—
1984	Jim Sweeney	PCAA	T–4th	N/A	6	6	0	—	—	—
1985 *	Jim Sweeney	PCAA	1st	N/A	11	0	1	Won California Bowl against Bowling Green Falcons 51–7 ^	—	—
1986	Jim Sweeney	PCAA	2nd	N/A	9	2	0	—	—	—
1987	Jim Sweeney	PCAA	T–2nd	N/A	6	5	0	—	—	—
1988 *	Jim Sweeney	BWC	1st	N/A	10	2	0	Won California Bowl against Western Michigan Broncos 35–30 ^	—	—
1989 *	Jim Sweeney	BWC	1st	N/A	11	1	0	Won California Bowl against Ball State Cardinals 27–6 ^	—	—
1990	Jim Sweeney	BWC	T–2nd	N/A	8	2	1	—	—	—
1991 *	Jim Sweeney	BWC	T–1st	N/A	10	2	0	Lost California Bowl to Bowling Green Falcons 21–28 ^	—	—
1992 *	Jim Sweeney	WAC	T–1st	N/A	9	4	0	Won Freedom Bowl against USC Trojans 24–7 ^	24	22
1993 *	Jim Sweeney	WAC	T–1st	N/A	8	4	0	Lost Aloha Bowl to Colorado Buffaloes 30–41 ^	—	—
1994	Jim Sweeney	WAC	7th	N/A	5	7	1	—	—	—
1995	Jim Sweeney	WAC	T–7th	N/A	5	7	0	—	—	—
1996	Jim Sweeney	WAC	—	T–5th	4	7	— (Note: Overtime rules in college football were introduced in 1996, making ties impossible in the years since.)	—	—	—
1997	Pat Hill	WAC	—	3rd	6	6	—	—	—	—
1998	Pat Hill	WAC	—	T–2nd	5	6	—	—	—	—
1999 *	Pat Hill	WAC	T–1st	N/A	8	5	—	Lost Las Vegas Bowl to Utah Utes 16–17 ^	—	—
2000	Pat Hill	WAC	2nd	N/A	7	5	—	Lost Silicon Valley Football Classic to Air Force Falcons 34–37 ^	—	—
2001	Pat Hill	WAC	2nd	N/A	11	3	—	Lost Silicon Valley Football Classic to Michigan State Spartans 30–21 ^	—	—
2002	Pat Hill	WAC	3rd	N/A	9	5	—	Won Silicon Valley Football Classic against Georgia Tech Yellow Jackets 35–44 ^	—	—
2003	Pat Hill	WAC	T–2nd	N/A	9	5	—	Won Silicon Valley Football Classic against UCLA Bruins 17–9 ^	—	—
2004	Pat Hill	WAC	T–3rd	N/A	9	3	—	Won MPC Computers Bowl against Virginia Cavaliers 37–34^{OT} ^	22	22
2005	Pat Hill	WAC	T–2nd	N/A	8	5	—	Lost Liberty Bowl to Tulsa Golden Hurricane 31–24 ^	—	—
2006	Pat Hill	WAC	4th	N/A	4	8	—	—	—	—
2007	Pat Hill	WAC	3rd	N/A	9	4	—	Won Humanitarian Bowl against Georgia Tech Yellow Jackets 40–28 ^	—	—
2008	Pat Hill	WAC	T–3rd	N/A	7	6	—	Lost New Mexico Bowl to Colorado State Rams 35–40 ^	—	—
2009	Pat Hill	WAC	3rd	N/A	8	5	—	Lost New Mexico Bowl to Wyoming Cowboys 28–35^{OT} ^	—	—
2010	Pat Hill	WAC	2nd	N/A	8	5	—	Lost Humanitarian Bowl to Northern Illinois Huskies 17–40 ^	—	—
2011	Pat Hill	WAC	T–4th	N/A	4	9	—	—	—	—
2012 *	Tim DeRuyter	MWC	T–1st	N/A	9	4	—	Lost Hawaii Bowl to SMU Mustangs 10–43 ^	—	—
2013 * †	Tim DeRuyter	MWC	1st	1st	11	2	—	Lost Las Vegas Bowl to USC Trojans 20–45 ^	—	—
2014 †	Tim DeRuyter	MWC	2nd	1st	6	8	—	Lost Hawaii Bowl to Rice Owls 6–30 ^	—	—
2015	Tim DeRuyter	MWC	—	T–4th	3	9	—	—	—	—
2016	Tim DeRuyter	MWC	—	6th	1	11	—	—	—	—
2017 †	Jeff Tedford	MWC	2nd	1st	10	4	—	Won Hawaii Bowl against Houston Cougars 33–27 ^	—	—
2018 * †	Jeff Tedford	MWC	1st	1st	12	2	—	Won Las Vegas Bowl against Arizona State Sun Devils 31–20 ^	18	18
2019	Jeff Tedford	MWC	—	6th	4	8	—	—	—	—
2020	Kalen DeBoer	MWC	6th	N/A	3	3	—	—	—	—
2021	Kalen DeBoer	MWC	—	2nd	10	3	—	Won New Mexico Bowl against UTEP Miners 31–24 ^	—	—
2022 * †	Jeff Tedford	MWC	1st	1st	10	4	—	Won LA Bowl against Washington State Cougars 29–6 ^	24	24
2023	Jeff Tedford	MWC	T–6th	N/A	9	4	—	Won New Mexico Bowl against New Mexico State 37–10 ^	—	—
2024	Tim Skipper	MWC	4th	N/A	6	7	—	Lost Famous Idaho Potato Bowl against Northern Illinois 20–28 ^	—	—
Total					635	439	27	(only includes regular season games)		
Total					17	15	0	(only includes bowl games)		
Total					652	454	27	(all games)		
