= List of Fresno State Bulldogs head football coaches =

List of head football coaches for the Fresno State Bulldogs

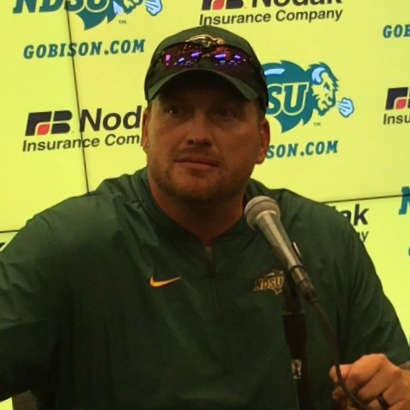
Matt Entz is the current head coach of the Bulldogs.

The Fresno State Bulldogs college football team represents California State University, Fresno (commonly referred to as Fresno State) in the Pac-12 Conference, as part of the NCAA Division I Football Bowl Subdivision. The program has had 20 head coaches, and 3 interim head coaches, since it began play during the 1921 season. The current head coach is Matt Entz, who has held the position since December 4, 2024.

Ten coaches have led Fresno State in postseason bowl games: James Bradshaw, Cecil Coleman, Darryl Rogers, Jim Sweeney, Pat Hill, Tim DeRuyter, Jeff Tedford, Lee Marks Tim Skipper, and Entz. Eleven coaches also won conference championships: Arthur W. Jones captured three as a member of the California Coast Conference; Leo Harris captured two, Stanley Borleske one, and Bradshaw one as a member of the Far Western Conference; Cecil Coleman captured three, Bradshaw and Clark Van Galder each had two, and Darryl Rogers one as a member of the California Collegiate Athletic Association; Sweeney captured six as a member of the Pacific Coast Athletic Association / Big West Conference; Sweeney captured two and Hill one as a member of the Western Athletic Conference; DeRuyter and Tedford each captured two as a member of the MWC.

Sweeney is the leader in seasons coached, with 19 years as head coach and games coached (221) and won (144). Bradshaw has the highest all-time winning percentage at 0.750. Earl Wight has the lowest winning percentage of those who have coached more than one game, with 0.000.

== Key ==
Key to symbols in coaches list
| General | | Overall | | Conference | | Postseason (Note: Although the first Rose Bowl Game was played in 1902, it has been continuously played since the 1916 game, and is recognized as the oldest bowl game by the NCAA. "—" indicates any season prior to 1916 when postseason games were not played.) | |
|---|---|---|---|---|---|---|---|
| No. | Order of coaches (Note: A running total of the number of head coaches, with coaches who served separate tenures being counted only once. Interim head coaches are represented with "Int" and are not counted in the running total. "—" indicates the team played but either without a coach or no coach is on record. "X" indicates an interim year without play.) | GC | Games coached | CW | Conference wins | PW | Postseason wins |
| DC | Division championships | OW | Overall wins | CL | Conference losses | PL | Postseason losses |
| CC | Conference championships | OL | Overall losses | CT | Conference ties | PT | Postseason ties |
| NC | National championships | OT | Overall ties (Note: Overtime rules in college football were introduced in 1996, making ties impossible in the period since.) | C% | Conference winning percentage | | |
| † | Elected to the College Football Hall of Fame | O% | Overall winning percentage (Note: When computing the win–loss percentage, a tie counts as half a win and half a loss.) | | | | |

== Coaches ==
List of head football coaches showing season(s) coached, overall records, conference records, postseason records, championships and selected awards (Note: Statistics correct as of the end of the 2025 NCAA Division I FCS football season.)
| No. | Name | Season(s) | GC | OW | OL | OT | O% | CW | CL | CT | C% | PW | PL | PT | DC | CC | NC | Awards |
|---|---|---|---|---|---|---|---|---|---|---|---|---|---|---|---|---|---|---|
| 1 | Arthur W. Jones | 1921–1928 | 69 | 36 | 26 | 7 | 0.572 | 11 | 10 | 4 | 0.520 | — | — | — | — | 3 | 0 | — |
| 2 | Stanley Borleske | 1929–1932 | 36 | 16 | 18 | 2 | 0.472 | 9 | 9 | 1 | 0.500 | — | — | — | — | 1 | 0 | — |
| 3 | Leo Harris | 1933–1935 | 28 | 18 | 9 | 1 | 0.661 | 8 | 2 | 1 | 0.773 | — | — | — | — | 2 | 0 | — |
| 4 | James Bradshaw | 1936–1942; 1946 | 82 | 59 | 18 | 5 | 0.750 | 16 | 6 | 2 | 0.708 | 2 | 0 | 0 | — | 3 | 0 | — |
| 5 | Earl Wight | 1944 | 6 | 0 | 6 | 0 | .000 | 0 | 0 | 0 | – | 0 | 0 | 0 | — | 0 | 0 | — |
| 6 | Alvin Pierson | 1945; 1949 | 23 | 7 | 14 | 2 | 0.348 | 1 | 3 | 0 | 0.250 | 0 | 0 | 0 | — | 0 | 0 | — |
| 7 | Ken Gleason | 1947–1948 | 21 | 6 | 12 | 3 | 0.357 | 4 | 4 | 2 | 0.500 | 0 | 0 | 0 | — | 0 | 0 | — |
| 8 | Duke Jacobs | 1950–1951 | 19 | 7 | 11 | 1 | 0.395 | 1 | 2 | 1 | 0.375 | 0 | 0 | 0 | — | 0 | 0 | — |
| 9 | Clark Van Galder | 1952–1958 | 70 | 46 | 22 | 2 | 0.671 | 15 | 4 | 1 | 0.775 | 0 | 0 | 0 | — | 3 | 0 | — |
| 10 | Cecil Coleman | 1959–1963 | 50 | 37 | 13 | 0 | 0.740 | 21 | 3 | 0 | 0.875 | 1 | 0 | 0 | — | 3 | 0 | — |
| 11 | Phil Krueger | 1964–1965 | 20 | 10 | 10 | 0 | 0.500 | 2 | 6 | 0 | 0.250 | 0 | 0 | 0 | — | 0 | 0 | — |
| 12 | Darryl Rogers | 1966–1972 | 76 | 43 | 32 | 1 | 0.572 | 19 | 14 | 0 | 0.576 | 0 | 2 | 0 | — | 1 | 0 | — |
| 13 | J. R. Boone | 1973–1975 | 34 | 10 | 24 | 0 | 0.294 | 3 | 10 | 0 | 0.231 | 0 | 0 | 0 | — | 0 | 0 | — |
| 14 | Jim Sweeney | 1976–1977; 1980–1996 | 221 | 144 | 74 | 3 | 0.658 | 83 | 41 | 2 | 0.667 | 5 | 2 | 0 | — | 8 | 0 | — |
| 15 | Bob Padilla | 1978–1979 | 22 | 7 | 15 | 0 | 0.318 | 3 | 7 | 0 | 0.300 | 0 | 0 | 0 | — | 0 | 0 | — |
| 16 | Pat Hill | 1997–2011 | 192 | 112 | 80 | — | 0.583 | 78 | 40 | — | 0.661 | 4 | 7 | — | — | 1 | 0 | — |
| 17 | Tim DeRuyter | 2012–2016 | 60 | 30 | 30 | — | 0.500 | 21 | 15 | — | 0.583 | 0 | 3 | — | 2 | 2 | 0 | — |
| Int | Eric Kiesau (Note: Kiesau served as interim head coach for the final four games of the 2016 season after DeRuyter was fired.) | 2016 | 4 | 0 | 4 | — | .000 | 0 | 4 | — | .000 | 0 | 0 | — | 0 | 0 | 0 | — |
| 18 | Jeff Tedford | 2017–2019; 2022–2023 | 67 | 45 | 22 | — | 0.672 | 27 | 13 | — | 0.675 | 4 | 0 | — | 3 | 2 | 0 | — |
| 19 | Kalen DeBoer | 2020–2021 | 18 | 12 | 6 | — | 0.667 | 9 | 5 | — | 0.643 | 0 | 0 | — | — | 0 | 0 | — |
| Int | Lee Marks (Note: Marks served as interim head coach for the 2021 New Mexico Bowl after DeBoer resigned to become head coach at Washington.) | 2021 | 1 | 1 | 0 | — | 1.000 | 1 | 0 | — | 1.000 | 1 | 0 | — | 0 | 0 | 0 | — |
| Int | Tim Skipper (Note: Skipper served as interim head coach for the 2024 season after Tedford stepped down for health reasons in July 2024.) | 2023–2024 | 14 | 7 | 7 | — | 0.500 | 4 | 3 | — | 0.571 | 1 | 1 | — | 0 | 0 | 0 | — |
| 20 | Matt Entz | 2025–present | 13 | 9 | 4 | — | .692 | 5 | 3 | — | .625 | 1 | 0 | — | — | 0 | 0 | — |
