= 1922 San Jose State Spartans football team =

American college football season

1922 San Jose State Spartans football
- Conference: California Coast Conference
- Record: 2–5–1 (0–3 CCC)
- Head coach: David Wooster (2nd season)
- Home stadium: Spartan Field

1922 California Coast Conference football standings
	Conf.					Overall
Team	W		L		T	W		L		T
Fresno State $	2	–	0	–	1	7	–	1	–	2
Pacific (CA)	3	–	0	–	0	6	–	1	–	0
Chico State	2	–	1	–	0	5	–	3	–	0
Modesto	2	–	2	–	1	2	–	3	–	4
Loyola (CA)	1	–	1	–	0	3	–	4	–	1
Sacramento	0	–	1	–	0	?	–	?	–	?
Cal Poly	0	–	2	–	0	1	–	3	–	0
San Jose State	0	–	3	–	0	2	–	5	–	1
$ – Conference champion

The 1922 San Jose State Spartans football team represented State Teachers College at San Jose (Note: San Jose State University was known as State Teachers College at San Jose from 1921 to 1934.) during the 1922 college football season.

San Jose State competed in the inaugural season of the California Coast Conference (CCC). The team was led by second-year head coach David Wooster, and they played home games at Spartan Field in San Jose, California. The team finished the season with a record of two wins, five losses and one tie (2–5–1, 0–3 CCC). The Spartans were outscored by their opponents 34-127 for the season, including being shutout in their last four games.

== Schedule ==
Date	Opponent	Site	Result	Source
October 6	San Jose High School*	Spartan Field; San Jose, CA	T 6–6	
October 13	San Mateo*	Spartan Field; San Jose, CA	L 3–6	
October 20 ?	Santa Clara High School*	Spartan Field; San Jose, CA	W 12–7	
October 27	San Benito*	Spartan Field; San Jose, CA	W 13–0	
November 4	Chico State	Spartan Field; San Jose, CA	L 0–21	
November 11	at Cal Aggies*	Davis, CA	L 0–58	
November 18	at Modesto	Modesto, California	L 0–6	
November 24	at Pacific (CA)	C.O.P. Field; College Park, San Jose, CA (rivalry)	L 0–23	
*Non-conference game
