= Art Acker =

American college sports coach (1891–1990)

Biographical details
- Born: July 17, 1891; Cleveland, Ohio, U.S.
- Died: December 24, 1990 (aged 99); California, U.S.

Playing career

Football
- c. 1915: Millikin

Basketball
- c. 1915: Millikin

Track and field
- c. 1915: Millikin

Coaching career (HC unless noted)

Football
- 1917–1918: Owensboro HS (KY)
- 1919: Stanford (freshmen)
- 1920–1922: Preston School of Industry
- 1923–1937: Chico State

Basketball
- 1923–1947: Chico State

Baseball
- 1923–1927: Chico State

Head coaching record
- Overall: 53–59–8 (college football); 339–205 (college basketball)

Accomplishments and honors

Championships
- Football; 3 CCC (1924–1926)

Arthur Lewis Acker (July 17, 1891 – December 24, 1990) was an American football, basketball, baseball, track and field, tennis, and boxing coach. He served as the head football coach at Chico State College—renamed from Chico State Teachers College in 1935 and now known as California State University, Chico—from 1923 to 1937, compiling a record of 53–59–8. Acker was also the head basketball coach at Chico State from 1924 to 1947, tallying a mark of 339–205.

Acker graduated from Millikin University in Decatur, Illinois in 1917. At Millikin, he played football and basketball and ran track. Acker began his coaching career in 1917 when he was hired as head football coach at Owensboro High School in Owensboro, Kentucky. He coached the freshmen team at Stanford University in 1919 and 1920. Acker came to Chico State in 1923 after coaching for three years at Preston School of Industry in Ione, California.

== Head coaching record ==
=== College football ===
| Year | Team | Overall | Conference | Standing | Bowl/playoffs |
|---|---|---|---|---|---|
Chico State Wildcats (California Coast Conference) (1923–1928)
| 1923 | Chico State | 5–2–2 | 2–1 | T–3rd | |
| 1924 | Chico State | 7–2 | 2–0 | 1st | |
| 1925 | Chico State | 7–1 | 5–0 | 1st | |
| 1926 | Chico State | 5–2–1 | 5–0–1 | 1st | |
| 1927 | Chico State | 6–2 | 5–1 | 2nd | |
| 1928 | Chico State | 2–6 | 1–4 | 8th | |
Chico State Wildcats (Far Western Conference) (1929–1937)
| 1929 | Chico State | 3–5 | 1–3 | T–4th | |
| 1930 | Chico State | 3–4 | 0–2 | T–5th | |
| 1931 | Chico State | 3–4–1 | 2–1–1 | T–1st | |
| 1930 | Chico State | 3–5 | 2–1 | 3rd | |
| 1933 | Chico State | 2–6 | 1–3 | 5th | |
| 1934 | Chico State | 4–3–1 | 2–1–1 | 3rd | |
| 1935 | Chico State | 2–5–1 | 0–4 | 5th | |
| 1936 | Chico State | 1–6–1 | 0–4 | 5th | |
| 1937 | Chico State | 0–6–1 | 0–4 | 5th | |
| Chico State: | | 53–59–8 | 28–29–3 | | |
| Total: | | 53–59–8 | | | |
National championship Conference title Conference division title or championship game berth
