= Erwin Righter =

American athlete, US international rugby union player and coach (1897–1985)

Biographical details
- Born: March 7, 1897; California, U.S.
- Died: August 30, 1985 (aged 88); Dayton, Ohio, U.S.

Playing career

Football
- 1917: Stanford
- 1919–1920: Stanford

Basketball
- 1916–1917: Stanford
- 1918–1921: Stanford

Coaching career (HC unless noted)

Football
- 1921–1932: Pacific (CA)
- 1934–1946: Burlingame HS (CA)

Basketball
- 1921–1933: Pacific (CA)

Head coaching record
- Overall: 54–34–4 (college football); 88–75 (college basketball)

Accomplishments and honors

Championships
- Football; 1 CCC (1923); 2 CCC North Division (1922–1923)
Medal record
Men's rugby union
Representing the United States
Olympic Games
Gold medal – first place	1920 Antwerp	Team competition

Cornelius Erwin "Swede" Righter (March 7, 1897 – August 30, 1985) was an American college football and college basketball player and coach, and a rugby union player who competed in the 1920 Summer Olympics.

Righter attended Stanford University, where he played football and basketball. He was Stanford's first All-Pacific Coast Conference basketball player in 1920. At the 1920 Olympics, Righter played on the American rugby union team that defeated France for the gold medal.

After his playing days, Righter coached basketball and football at the University of the Pacific from 1921 to 1933. In 12 seasons as head football coach, he led the Pacific Tigers football program to a record of 54–34–4. Righter coached the football team at Burlingame High School in Burlingame, California from 1934 to 1946. He was succeeded by Ted Forbes in 1947.

Righter died on August 30, 1985, in Dayton, Ohio.

== Head coaching record ==
=== College football ===
Year	Team	Overall	Conference	Standing	Bowl/playoffs
Pacific Tigers (Independent) (1921)
1921	Pacific	3–1			
Pacific Tigers (California Coast Conference) (1922–1923)
1922	Pacific	6–1	3–0	1st (North)	
1923	Pacific	7–0	4–0	1st (North)	
Pacific Tigers (Independent) (1924)
1924	Pacific	6–3			
Pacific Tigers (Far Western Conference) (1925–1932)
1925	Pacific	5–2	1–2	4th	
1926	Pacific	5–3–1	1–2–1	T–3rd	
1927	Pacific	2–6	1–4	6th	
1928	Pacific	5–2	2–1	4th	
1929	Pacific	3–4–1	1–3–1	T–4th	
1930	Pacific	3–6	2–2	3rd	
1931	Pacific	5–2–2	2–1–2	T–1st	
1932	Pacific	4–4	2–2	4th	
Pacific:		54–34–4	19–17–4		
Total:		54–34–4			
National championship Conference title Conference division title or championship game berth
