= David Wooster (American football) =

American football, basketball, and track & field coach

Biographical details
- Born: September 5, 1891; Kansas, U.S.
- Died: March 22, 1976 (aged 84)
- Education: Emporia State Normal (BS, 1912); Kansas State Agricultural (DVM)

Coaching career (HC unless noted)

Football
- 1921–1922: San Jose State

Basketball
- 1921–1923: San Jose State

Track and field
- 1923: San Jose State

Head coaching record
- Overall: 3–10–1 (football); 17–9 (basketball)

David Thomas Wooster (September 5, 1891 – March 22, 1976) was an American football, basketball and track and field coach. He served as the head football coach (1921–1922), head basketball coach (1921–1923) and head track coach (1923) at San Jose State University.

== Head coaching record ==
=== Football ===
Year	Team	Overall	Conference	Standing	Bowl/playoffs
San Jose State Spartans (Independent) (1921)
1921	San Jose State	1–5			
San Jose State Spartans (California Coast Conference) (1922)
1922	San Jose State	2–5–1	0–3	8th	
San Jose State:		3–10–1	0–3		
Total:		3–10–1			
