= 1922 Pacific Tigers football team =

American college football season

1922 Pacific Tigers football

CCC North Division champion

CCC Championship, L 7–12 vs. Fresno State
- Conference: California Coast Conference
- North Division
- Record: 6–1 (3–0 CCC)
- Head coach: Erwin Righter (2nd season)

1922 California Coast Conference football standings
	Conf.					Overall
Team	W		L		T	W		L		T
Fresno State $	2	–	0	–	1	7	–	1	–	2
Pacific (CA)	3	–	0	–	0	6	–	1	–	0
Chico State	2	–	1	–	0	5	–	3	–	0
Modesto	2	–	2	–	1	2	–	3	–	4
Loyola (CA)	1	–	1	–	0	3	–	4	–	1
Sacramento	0	–	1	–	0	?	–	?	–	?
Cal Poly	0	–	2	–	0	1	–	3	–	0
San Jose State	0	–	3	–	0	2	–	5	–	1
$ – Conference champion

The 1922 Pacific Tigers football team represented the College of the Pacific—now known as the University of the Pacific—in San Jose, California as a member of the California Coast Conference (CCC) during the 1922 college football season. The team was led by second-year head coach Erwin Righter and played home games at a field on campus in San Jose. Pacific compiled an overall record of 6–1 with a mark of 3–0 in conference playing, winning the CCC North division in the conference's inaugural season. The Tigers dominated their opponents, outscoring them 105–19 for the season and had five shutouts in the seven games. At the end of the season, Pacific met the champion of the CCC South Division, Fresno State, for the conference championship. The game was played in Fresno, California and resulted in the only blemish on the Pacific schedule, a 12–7 loss. This was the Tigers' last season at the old campus in San Jose before they moved to Stockton.

== Schedule ==
Date	Opponent	Site	Result
October 19	San Francisco Wanderer FBC*	C.O.P. Field; College Park, San Jose, CA	W 7–0
October 20	San Benito County Junior College*	C.O.P. Field; College Park, San Jose, CA	W 8–0
November 11	USS Camden*	C.O.P. Field; College Park, San Jose, CA	W 13–0
November 18	at Chico State	Chico, CA	W 28–0
November 24	San Jose State	C.O.P. Field; College Park, San Jose, CA (rivalry)	W 23–0
November 30	at Modesto	Modesto, CA	W 19–7
December 9	at Fresno State*	Fire/Police Baseball Park; Fresno, CA (CCC Championship)	L 7–12
*Non-conference game
