= 1926 Chico State Wildcats football team =

American college football season

1926 Chico State Wildcats football

CCC champion
- Conference: California Coast Conference
- Record: 5–2–1 (5–0–1 CCC)
- Head coach: Art Acker (4th season)
- Home stadium: College Field

1926 California Coast Conference football standings
	Conf.					Overall
Team	W		L		T	W		L		T
Chico State $	5	–	0	–	1	5	–	2	–	1
Sacramento	4	–	1	–	1	?	–	?	–	?
San Mateo	3	–	1	–	0	0	–	0	–	0
Modesto	2	–	3	–	1	2	–	3	–	1
Cal Poly	1	–	3	–	0	5	–	4	–	0
Santa Rosa	1	–	4	–	0	?	–	?	–	?
San Jose State	0	–	5	–	1	1	–	6	–	1
$ – Conference champion

The 1926 Chico State Wildcats football team represented Chico State Teachers College—now known as California State University, Chico—as a member of the California Coast Conference (CCC) during the 1926 college football season. Led by fourth-year head coach Art Acker, Chico State compiled an overall record of 5–2–1 with a mark of 5–0–1 in conference play, winning the CCC title for the third consecutive season. The team outscored its opponents 87 to 32 for the season. The Wildcats played home games at College Field in Chico, California.

== Schedule ==
Date	Opponent	Site	Result	Source
October 9	Santa Rosa	College Field; Chico, CA	W 1–0 (forfeit win)	
October 16	St. Ignatius (CA)*	College Field; Chico, CA	L 0–6	
October 22	at Modesto	Modesto, CA	W 20–0	
October 30	at San Jose State	Spartan Field; San Jose, CA	W 21–0	
November 6	at Pacific (CA)*	C.O.P. Field; Stockton, California	L 6–20	
November 11	Cal Poly	College Field; Chico, CA	W 26–0	
November 19	at San Mateo	Burlingame High School; Burlingame, CA	W 13–6	
November 25	Sacramento	College Field; Chico, CA	T 0–0	
*Non-conference game
