= 1925 San Jose State Spartans football team =

American college football season

1925 San Jose State Spartans football
- Conference: California Coast Conference
- Record: 2–5 (2–4 CCC)
- Head coach: Ernesto R. Knollin (2nd season)
- Home stadium: Spartan Field

1925 California Coast Conference football standings
	Conf.					Overall
Team	W		L		T	W		L		T
Chico State $	5	–	0	–	0	7	–	1	–	0
San Mateo			–					–
Modesto	3	–	3	–	0	3	–	6	–	1
Cal Poly	1	–	2	–	0	4	–	5	–	0
San Jose State	2	–	4	–	0	2	–	5	–	0
Bakersfield	0	–	1	–	0	0	–	1	–	0
Sacramento			–					–
Santa Rosa			–					–
$ – Conference champion; Includes forfeit by San Mateo to Chico State

The 1925 San Jose State Spartans football team represented State Teachers College at San Jose (Note: San Jose State University was known as State Teachers College at San Jose from 1921 to 1934.) during the 1925 college football season.

San Jose State competed in the California Coast Conference (CCC). The team was led by second-year head coach Ernesto R. Knollin, and they played home games at Spartan Field in San Jose, California. The team finished the season with a record of two wins and five losses (2–5, 2–4 CCC). The Spartans were outscored by their opponents 69–158 for the season.

== Schedule ==
Date	Opponent	Site	Result	Source
October 10	Santa Rosa	Santa Clara, CA	W 21–0	
October 17	at Modesto	Modesto, CA	L 0–16	
October 24	at Fresno State*	Fresno, CA (rivalry)	L 7–23	
November 7	at Chico State	University Stadium; Chico, CA	L 0–53	
November 14	at San Mateo	San Mateo, CA	L 14–44	
November 20	Cal Poly	Spartan Field; San Jose, CA	W 20–9	
November 26	Sacramento	Spartan Field; San Jose, CA	L 7–13	
*Non-conference game
