= 1922 Chico State Wildcats football team =

American college football season

1922 Chico State Wildcats football
- Conference: California Coast Conference
- North Division
- Record: 5–3 (2–1 CCC)
- Head coach: George Sperry (2nd season)
- Home stadium: College Field

1922 California Coast Conference football standings
	Conf.					Overall
Team	W		L		T	W		L		T
Fresno State $	2	–	0	–	1	7	–	1	–	2
Pacific (CA)	3	–	0	–	0	6	–	1	–	0
Chico State	2	–	1	–	0	5	–	3	–	0
Modesto	2	–	2	–	1	2	–	3	–	4
Loyola (CA)	1	–	1	–	0	3	–	4	–	1
Sacramento	0	–	1	–	0	?	–	?	–	?
Cal Poly	0	–	2	–	0	1	–	3	–	0
San Jose State	0	–	3	–	0	2	–	5	–	1
$ – Conference champion

The 1922 Chico State Wildcats football team represented Chico State Teachers College—now known as California State University, Chico—as a member of the California Coast Conference (CCC) during the 1922 college football season. Led by George Sperry in his second and final season as head coach, Chico State compiled an overall record of 5–3 with a mark of 2–1 in conference play. The team outscored its opponents 115 to 86 for the season and had four shutout victories. The Wildcats played home games at College Field in Chico, California.

Sperry finished his tenure at Chico State with an overall record of 9–5–1, for a .633 winning percentage.

== Schedule ==
Date	Opponent	Site	Result	Source
September 30	Cal Aggies*	College Field; Chico, CA	L 0–49	
October	Sacramento*	College Field; Chico, CA	W 43–0	
October	Modesto	College Field; Chico, CA	W 12–6	
October	Preston Industrial School (Note: The Preston School of Industry was opened in 1894 to rehabilitate juvenile offenders. It remained open until 2011.)*	College Field; Chico, CA	W 33–0	
November 4	San Jose State	College Field; Chico, CA	W 21–0	
November 11	American Legion (Chico)*	College Field; Chico, CA	W 6–0	
November 18	at Pacific (CA)	Spartan Field; San Jose, CA	L 0–28	
November 23	Chico High School*	College Field; Chico, CA	L 0–3	
*Non-conference game
