= 1922 Cal Poly Mustangs football team =

American college football season

1922 Cal Poly Mustangs football
- Conference: California Coast Conference
- Record: 1–3 (0–2 CCC)
- Head coach: Al Agosti (2nd season)

1922 California Coast Conference football standings
	Conf.					Overall
Team	W		L		T	W		L		T
Fresno State $	2	–	0	–	1	7	–	1	–	2
Pacific (CA)	3	–	0	–	0	6	–	1	–	0
Chico State	2	–	1	–	0	5	–	3	–	0
Modesto	2	–	2	–	1	2	–	3	–	4
Loyola (CA)	1	–	1	–	0	3	–	4	–	1
Sacramento	0	–	1	–	0	?	–	?	–	?
Cal Poly	0	–	2	–	0	1	–	3	–	0
San Jose State	0	–	3	–	0	2	–	5	–	1
$ – Conference champion

The 1922 Cal Poly Mustangs football team represented California Polytechnic School—now known as California Polytechnic State University, San Luis Obispo—as a member of the California Coast Conference (CCC) during the 1922 college football season. This was the first year for the CCC and there were only nine conference games played by the eight member teams. Led by second-year head coach Al Agosti, Cal Poly compiled an overall record of 1–3 with a mark of 0–2 in conference play. The team was outscored by its opponents 70 to 13 for the season and was shut out in all three of its losses. The Mustangs played home games in San Luis Obispo, California.

Cal Poly was a two-year school until 1941.

== Schedule ==
Date	Opponent	Site	Result
October 7	Loyola (CA)	Los Angeles, CA	L 0–25
October 14	Santa Barbara State*	San Luis Obispo, CA	W 13–7
October 21	at Stanford reserves*	Stanford, CA	L 0–18
November 4	Fresno State	San Luis Obispo, CA	L 0–20
*Non-conference game
