= 1926 San Jose State Spartans football team =

American college football season

1926 San Jose State Spartans football
- Conference: California Coast Conference
- Record: 1–6–1 (0–5–1 CCC)
- Head coach: Ernesto R. Knollin (3rd season)
- Home stadium: Spartan Field

1926 California Coast Conference football standings
| | Conf. | | | | | Overall |
| Team | W | | L | | T | W | | L | | T |
|---|---|---|---|---|---|---|---|---|---|---|
| Chico State $ | 5 | – | 0 | – | 1 | 5 | – | 2 | – | 1 |
| Sacramento | 4 | – | 1 | – | 1 | ? | – | ? | – | ? |
| San Mateo | 3 | – | 1 | – | 0 | 0 | – | 0 | – | 0 |
| Modesto | 2 | – | 3 | – | 1 | 2 | – | 3 | – | 1 |
| Cal Poly | 1 | – | 3 | – | 0 | 5 | – | 4 | – | 0 |
| Santa Rosa | 1 | – | 4 | – | 0 | ? | – | ? | – | ? |
| San Jose State | 0 | – | 5 | – | 1 | 1 | – | 6 | – | 1 |
$ – Conference champion

The 1926 San Jose State Spartans football team represented State Teachers College at San Jose (Note: San Jose State University was known as State Teachers College at San Jose from 1921 to 1934.) during the 1926 college football season.

San Jose State competed in the California Coast Conference (CCC). The team was led by third-year head coach Ernesto R. Knollin, and they played home games at Spartan Field in San Jose, California. The team finished the season with a record of one win, six losses and one tie (1–6–1, 0–5–1 CCC). The Spartans were outscored by their opponents 26–120 for the season, and were shut out in five of their eight games.

== Schedule ==
| Date | Opponent | Site | Result |
|---|---|---|---|
| October 2 | Modesto | Spartan Field; San Jose, CA | T 0–0 |
| October 8 | Bakersfield* | Spartan Field; San Jose, CA | W 14–0 |
| October 16 | San Mateo | Spartan Field; San Jose, CA | L 6–14 |
| October 23 | at Cal Poly | San Luis Obispo, CA | L 0–13 |
| October 30 | Chico State | Spartan Field; San Jose, CA | L 0–21 |
| November 6 | at Fresno State* | Fresno State College Stadium; Fresno, CA (rivalry) | L 0–34 |
| November 13 | at Santa Rosa | Santa Rosa, CA | L 6–12 |
| November 19 | Sacramento | Spartan Field; San Jose, CA | L 0–26 |
*Non-conference game
