= Sara J. Dorr =

American temperance leader (1855–1924)

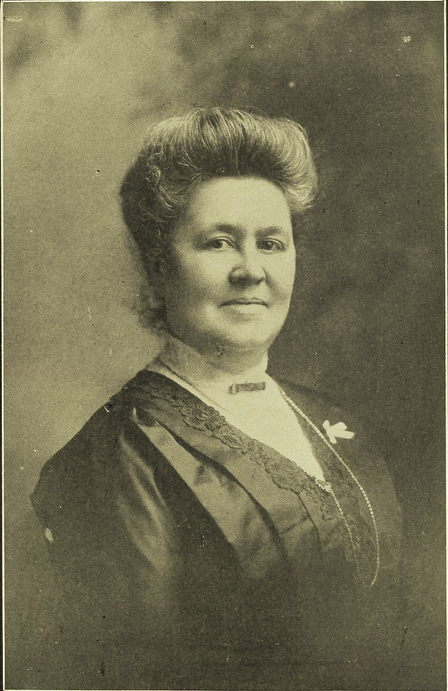
- Born: Sara Josephine Sweeney; June 17, 1855; Columbia, Maine, U.S.
- Died: December 31, 1924 (aged 69); College Park, California, U.S.
- Resting place: Oak Hill Cemetery
- Occupation(s): Temperance activist, leader
- Organization: Woman's Christian Temperance Union
- Movement: Temperance
- Spouse: Stillman Magee Dorr (m. 1877)

Sara J. Dorr (June 17, 1855 – December 31, 1924) was an American temperance leader. She served as California state president of the Woman's Christian Temperance Union (WCTU). Aside from her anti-liquor activities, Dorr had been prominent in red light abatement and other social movements. She relinquished active control of the WCTU in 1921 and thereafter, devoted most of her time to lecturing and traveling.

== Early life and education ==
Sara Josephine Sweeney was born at Columbia, Maine, June 17, 1855. Her parents were Charles William Sweeney (1829-1906) and Elvenor Josephine Ingersoll (1836-1916).

She was educated in the public schools of Maine.

== Career ==
Dorr worked as a teacher for some years after her graduation from the high school of Washington County, Maine.

On May 14, 1877, in Columbia, Maine, she married Stillman Magee Dorr of Maine. They had two sons, Harvey Emmonds Dorr and Charles Sweeney Dorr.

She joined the International Organisation of Good Templars at the age of 15, and in 1886, was chosen leader of a newly formed Band of Hope in her home community. The movement proved popular, adults as well as children joining it until the membership reached 200.

In December 1889, the family moved from Machias, Maine to the San Joaquin Valley and settled in Stockton, California.

She became a member of the WCTU, serving for a number of years as president of local and county organizations, and was then made vice-president-at-large of the State. In 1907, she was elected president of the WCTU of California, (Note: According to Cherrington (1925), Dorr was elected president of the Northern California WCTU.) holding that position until 1921, when she was made State president emeritus.

From 1921, she served as State lecturer and organizer. In 1922, she was in the field about seven months, working in 15 different counties, chiefly in the interest of the Wright Act, passed in that year, which proposed state enforcement of the 1919 federal prohibition of alcoholic drinks, the Volstead Act. Personally acquainted with many members of the California State Legislature, Dorr spent much time attending the sessions of that body in the interest of various reform movements. A notable legislative achievement in which the WCTU took the initiative and led the campaign was known as the Red Light Abatement Law, intended to curtail or eliminate prostitution, which passed the California Legislature in 1913. Dorr was a member of the State ratification committee.

== Death ==
Sara J. Dorr lived in California for 35 years, and specifically in College Park, San Jose, California, for 23 years before she died there, December 31, 1924. Interment was at the Oak Hill Cemetery in San Jose, California.
