= 1926 Cal Poly Mustangs football team =

American college football season

1926 Cal Poly Mustangs football
- Conference: California Coast Conference
- Record: 5–4 (1–3 CCC)
- Head coach: Al Agosti (6th season)

1926 California Coast Conference football standings
	Conf.					Overall
Team	W		L		T	W		L		T
Chico State $	5	–	0	–	1	5	–	2	–	1
Sacramento	4	–	1	–	1	?	–	?	–	?
San Mateo	3	–	1	–	0	0	–	0	–	0
Modesto	2	–	3	–	1	2	–	3	–	1
Cal Poly	1	–	3	–	0	5	–	4	–	0
Santa Rosa	1	–	4	–	0	?	–	?	–	?
San Jose State	0	–	5	–	1	1	–	6	–	1
$ – Conference champion

The 1926 Cal Poly Mustangs football team represented California Polytechnic School—now known as California Polytechnic State University, San Luis Obispo—as a member of the California Coast Conference (CCC) during the 1926 college football season. Led by sixth-year head coach Al Agosti, Cal Poly compiled an overall record of 5–4 with a mark of 1–3 in conference play. The team outscored its opponents 119 to 111 for the season. The Mustangs played home games in San Luis Obispo, California.

Cal Poly was a two-year school until 1941.

== Schedule ==
Date	Opponent	Site	Result	Source
September 18	at San Luis Obispo High School*	San Luis Obispo, CA	W 22–0	
September 25	Lompoc High School*	San Luis Obispo, CA	W 34–0	
October 2	Stanford freshmen*	Palo Alto, CA	L 0–46	
October 9	at Modesto	Modesto, CA	L 2–14	
October 16	at Santa Maria High School*	Santa Maria, CA	W 10–0	
October 23	San Jose State	San Luis Obispo, CA	W 13–0	
October 30	at Sacramento	Sacramento, CA	L 7–25	
November 11	at Chico State	College Field; Chico, CA	L 0–26	
November 20	Bakersfield*	San Luis Obispo, CA	W 31–0	
*Non-conference game
