= Fresno State Bulldogs men's basketball =

American college men's basketball team

2026–27 Fresno State Bulldogs men's basketball team
- University: California State University, Fresno
- First season: 1921–22; 105 years ago
- Athletic director: Garrett Klassy
- Head coach: Vance Walberg; 3rd season, 19–45 (.297)
- Location: Fresno, California
- Arena: Save Mart Center (capacity: 14,544)
- NCAA division: Division I
- Conference: Pac-12
- Nickname: Bulldogs
- Colors: Cardinal red and blue
- All-time record: 1,413–1,195 (.542)

NCAA Division I tournament Elite Eight
- NCAA Division II; 1963, 1966
Other NCAA Division I tournament results
Sweet Sixteen	NCAA Division II; 1958, 1960, 1963, 1964, 1965, 1966; NCAA Division I 1982
Appearances	NCAA Division II; 1958, 1960, 1962, 1963, 1964, 1965, 1966; NCAA Division I 1981, 1982, 1984, 2000*, 2001, 2016

NIT champions
- 1983

Conference tournament champions
- 1981, 1982, 1984, 2000, 2016

Conference regular-season champions
- 1978, 1981, 1982, 1996, 2001, 2003

Uniforms
Home	Away	Alternate
- * vacated by NCAA

The Fresno State Bulldogs men's basketball team represents California State University, Fresno, located in Fresno, California. The program competes in the Pac-12 Conference (Pac-12) in Division I of the National Collegiate Athletic Association (NCAA). The Bulldogs play their home games at the Save Mart Center. Vance Walberg is the head coach for the Bulldogs. They were members of the Western Athletic Conference from 1992 to 2012 and the Mountain West Conference from 2013 to 2025.

== History ==
=== Vance Walberg era (2024–present) ===
On April 6, 2024, Vance Walberg was hired as the head coach of the Bulldogs. In Walberg’s first season, the Bulldogs went 6–26 and finished tenth in the conference. The Bulldogs improved to a 13–19 record the following season in 2025–2026.

== Postseason ==
=== NCAA Division I ===
The Bulldogs have appeared in six* NCAA Tournaments, with a combined record of 2–6.

Year	Seed	Round	Opponent	Result
1981	6 W	Round of 48	(11) Northeastern	L 53–55
1982	4 W	Round of 32; Sweet Sixteen	(5) West Virginia (1) #6 Georgetown	W 50–46; L 40–58
1984	7 MW	Round of 48	(10) Louisiana Tech	L 56–66
2000*	9 W	Round of 64	(8) Wisconsin	L 56–66
2001	9 S	Round of 64; Round of 32	(8) California (1) #3 Michigan State	W 82–70; L 65–81
2016	14 M	Round of 64	(3) #13 Utah	L 69–80

*The appearance in 2000 was vacated due to the use of an ineligible player.

=== NCAA Division II ===
The Bulldogs appeared in seven NCAA Division II men's basketball tournaments, where they had a combined record of 8-8.

Year	Round	Opponent	Result
1958	Regional Semifinals; Regional Finals	San Francisco State; Chapman	W 69–56; L 49–52
1960	Regional Semifinals; Regional Finals	Chico State; Chapman	W 62–49; L 62–70
1962	Regional Semifinals; Regional Third Place	Cal Poly Pomona; Seattle Pacific	L 81–88; L 68–73
1963	Regional Semifinals; Regional Finals; Elite Eight	UC Santa Barbara; Chapman; South Dakota State	W 68–60; W 71–59; L 71–84
1964	Regional Semifinals; Regional Finals	Seattle Pacific; Cal Poly Pomona	W 68–53; L 72–79
1965	Regional Semifinals; Regional Finals	Nevada Southern; Seattle Pacific	W 74–61; L 68–82
1966	Regional Semifinals; Regional Finals; Elite Eight	Nevada; Seattle Pacific; Southern Illinois	W 127–78; W 64–58; L 70–93

=== National Invitation Tournament results ===
The Bulldogs have appeared in ten National Invitation Tournaments, with a combined record of 14–10; they were champions in 1983.

Year	Round	Opponent	Result/Score
1983	First Round; Second Round; Quarterfinals; Semifinals; Championship	UTEP; Michigan State; Oregon State; Wake Forest; DePaul	W 71–64; W 72–58; W 76–67; W 86–62; W 69–60
1985	First Round; Second Round; Quarterfinals	Santa Clara; New Mexico; UCLA	W 79–76; W 66–55; L 43–53
1994	First Round; Second Round; Quarterfinals	USC; BYU; Kansas State	W 79–76; W 68–66; L 77–115
1996	First Round; Second Round; Quarterfinals	Miami (OH); Michigan State; Nebraska	W 58–57; W 80–70; L 71–83
1997	First Round	Nevada	L 86–97
1998	First Round; Second Round; Quarterfinals; Semifinals; 3rd Place Game	Pacific; Memphis; Hawaiʻi; Minnesota; Georgia	W 73–70; W 83–80; W 85–83; L 89–91; L 79–95
1999	First Round	California	L 71–79
2002	First Round	Temple	L 75–81
2007	First Round	Georgia	L 78–88
2017	First Round	TCU	L 59–66

=== College Basketball Invitational results ===
The Bulldogs have appeared in one College Basketball Invitational, with a record of 4–2.

Year	Round	Opponent	Result/Score
2014	First Round; Quarterfinals; Semifinals; Finals Game 1 Finals Game 2 Finals Game 3	UTEP; Princeton; Old Dominion; Siena; Siena; Siena	W 61–56; W 72–56; W 71–64; L 57–61; W 89–75; L 68–81

=== The Basketball Classic results ===
The Bulldogs have appeared in The Basketball Classic one time. Their record is 4–0, and they won the Championship in 2022.

Year	Round	Opponent	Result/Score
2022	First Round; Second Round; Semifinals; Championship	Eastern Washington; Youngstown State; Southern Utah; Coastal Carolina	W 83–74; W 80–71; W 67–48; W 85–74

=== Regular-season conference championships ===
Pacific Coast Athletic Association (3)

- 1978, 1981, 1982

Western Athletic Conference (3)

- 1996, 2001, 2003

=== Conference tournament championships ===
Pacific Coast Athletic Association tournament (3)

- 1981, 1982, 1984

Western Athletic Conference tournament (1)

- 2000 (vacated)

Mountain West Conference tournament (1)

- 2016

== Facilities ==
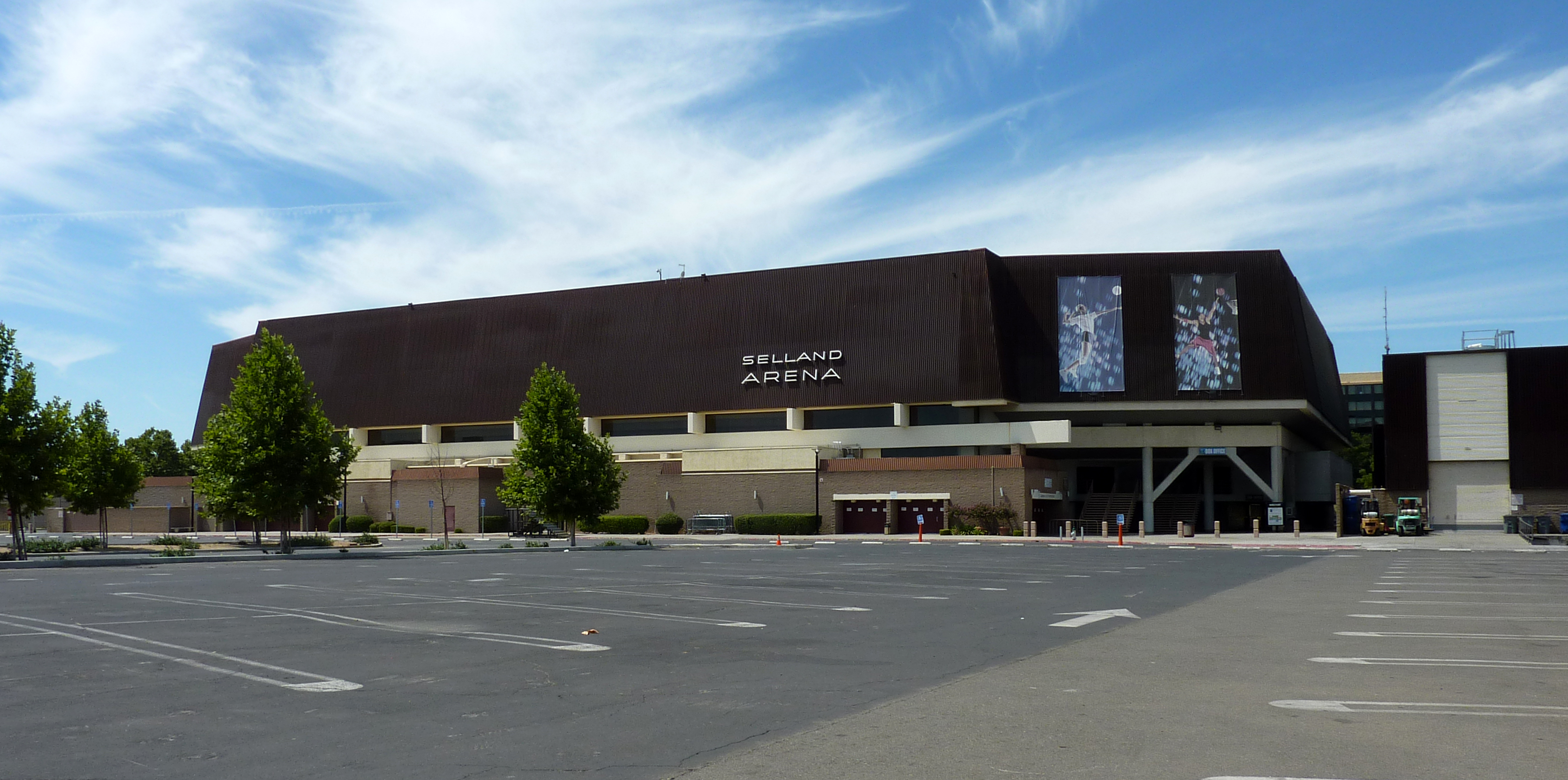
Selland Arena served as the home court for the Fresno State Men’s Basketball Team from 1967–2003

The men's basketball team played in the 1,551 seat North Gym from 1957 to 1966. From 1967 to 2003, the Bulldogs played their home games at Selland Arena, named after former Fresno mayor Arthur L. Selland.

=== Save Mart Center ===
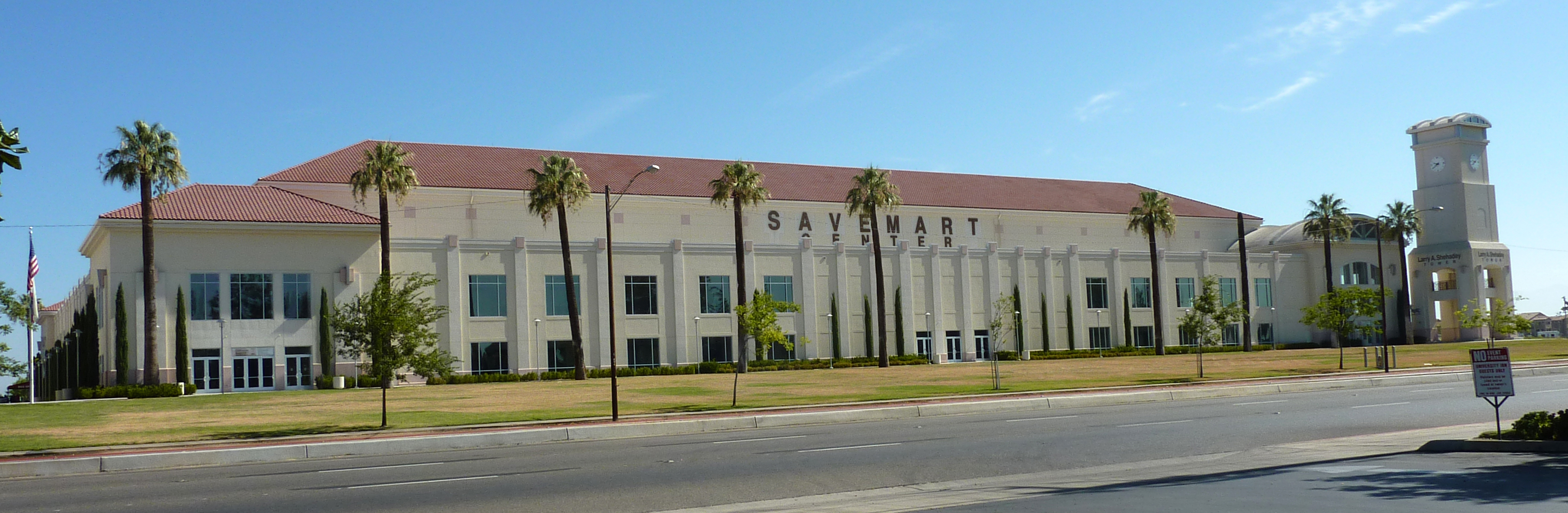
Save Mart Center, 2009

Since 2003, the Bulldogs have played their home games at the Save Mart Center.

== Coaches ==
The Fresno State men's basketball team has had 20 head coaches in their program’s history.

Head Coach	Years	Record	Pct.
Arthur W. Jones	1921–1929	70–53	.569
Flint Hanner	1929–1932; 1944–45	27–26	.509
Leo Harris	1932–1933	7–7	.500
No coach	1933–1934	—	—
Stanley Borleske	1934–1939	43–61	.414
Hal Beatty	1939–1942; 1945–1947	49–57	.462
No team	1943–1944	—	—
Pix Pierson	1944–1945	6–6–1	.500
Cornelius Warmerdam	1947–1953	55–107	.340
Clark Van Galder	1953–1954	12–16	.429
Bill Vandenburgh	1954–1960	89–63	.586
Harry Miller	1960–1965	93–39	.705
Ed Gregory	1965–1977	172–142	.548
Boyd "Tiny" Grant	1977–1986	194–74	.724
Ron Adams	1986–1990	43–72	.374
Gary Colson	1990–1995	76–73	.510
Jerry Tarkanian	1995–2002	104–79	.657
Ray Lopes	2002–2005	50–37	.575
Steve Cleveland	2005–2011	92–98	.484
Rodney Terry	2011–2018	104–79	.657
Justin Hutson	2018–2024	92–94	.495
Vance Walberg	2024–present	19–45	.297

== Retired numbers ==
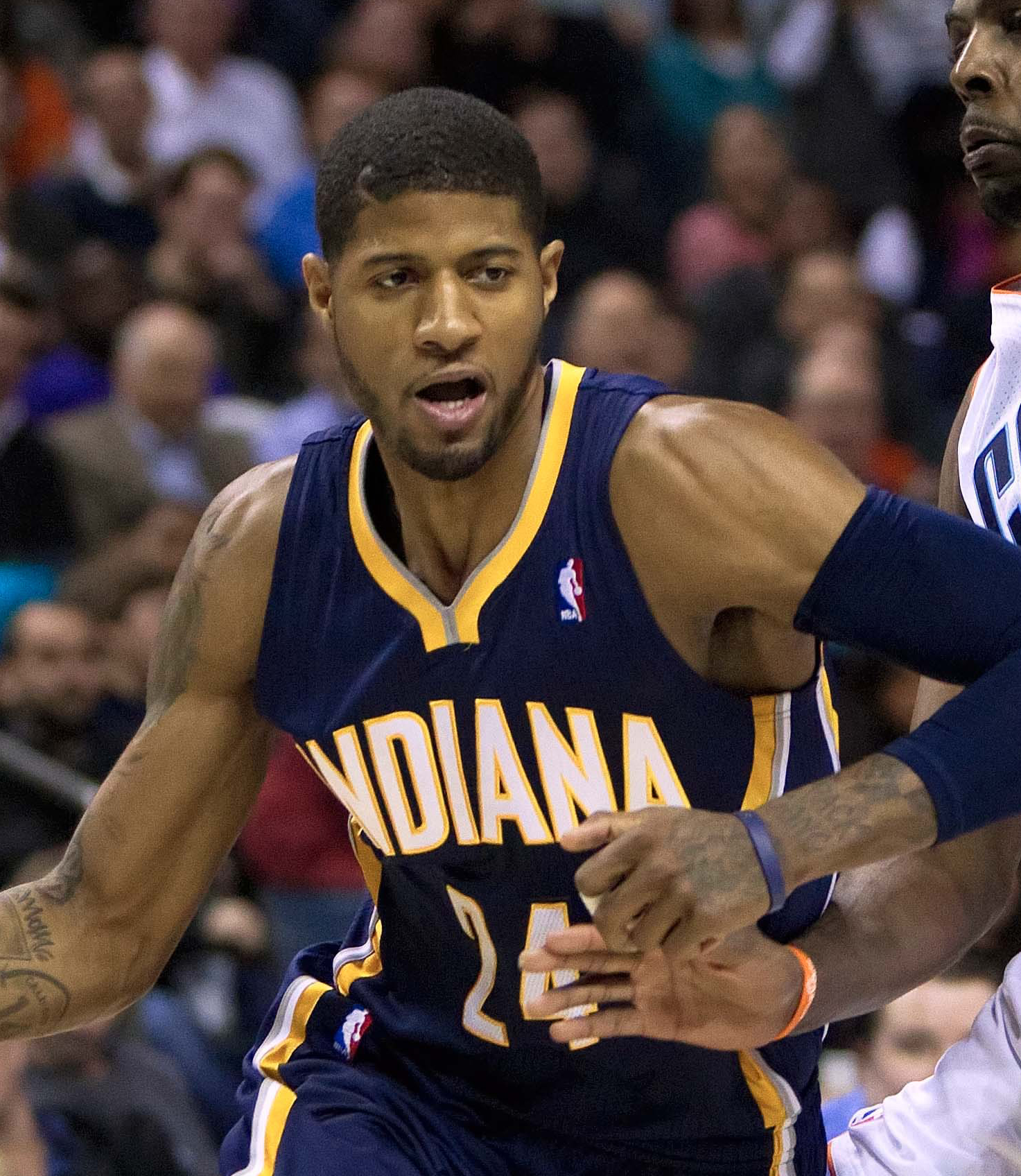
Paul George has his #24 retired by Fresno

Fresno State Bulldogs retired numbers
No.	Player	Pos.	Tenure	No. ret.	Ref.
2	Jerry Tarkanian	G (Note: Also head coach (1995–2002).)	1954–1955	2014	
24	Paul George	SF	2008–2010	2019	

== Notable players ==
- Courtney Alexander
- Rafer Alston
- Ron Anderson
- Desi Barmore (born 1960), American-Israeli basketball player
- Melvin Ely (born 1978)
- Paul George (born 1990), basketball player
- Nate Grimes (born 1996), basketball player in the Israeli Basketball Premier League
- Chris Herren (born 1975)
- Rod Higgins
- Tyler Johnson (born 1992), basketball player
- Tito Maddox (born 1981)
- Brian Santiago, athletic director at Brigham Young University
- Deshon Taylor (born 1996), basketball player (free agent)
- Bernard Thompson
- Art Williams
- Braeden Anderson

== Conferences ==
Years	Conferences	Win–loss	Pct.
1921–1922, 1942–1945, 1951–1952	None	—	—
1922–1924	California Coast Conference		
1925–1939	Far Western Conference (FWC)		
1939–1941, 1946–1950, 1953–1968	California Collegiate Athletic Association (CCAA)		
1969–1991	Pacific Coast Athletic Association (PCAA) / Big West Conference (BWC)		
1992–2012	Western Athletic Conference (WAC)		
2013–2026	Mountain West Conference (MW)		
2026–present	Pac-12 Conference (Pac-12)		
