= Arthur W. Jones =

American athlete and coach

Biographical details
- Born: July 15, 1891; New Albany, Indiana, U.S.
- Died: March 22, 1962 (aged 70); San Anselmo, California, U.S.

Playing career

Football
- 1910–1912: Indiana

Basketball
- 1911–1912: Indiana

Coaching career (HC unless noted)

Football
- 1916: Montgomery HS (AL)
- 1921–1928: Fresno State

Basketball
- 1921–1929: Fresno State

Baseball
- 1922–1926: Fresno State

Head coaching record
- Overall: 36–26–7 (college football); 80–53 (college basketball); 24–13 (college baseball)

Accomplishments and honors

Championships
- Football; 2 CCC (1922–1923)

Arthur W. Jones (July 15, 1891 – March 22, 1962) was an American college football, college basketball, and college baseball player, coach, and educator. He served as the head football coach at Fresno State University in Fresno, California from 1921 to 1928.

Jones was the director of physical education at Mission High School in San Francisco until his retirement in the late 1950s. He resided in San Anselmo, California, where he died on March 22, 1962.

== Head coaching record ==
=== College football ===
Year	Team	Overall	Conference	Standing	Bowl/playoffs
Fresno State Bulldogs (Independent) (1921)
1921	Fresno State	3–4			
Fresno State Bulldogs (California Coast Conference) (1922–1924)
1922	Fresno State	7–1–2	2–0–1	1st	
1923	Fresno State	7–2	3–0	T–1st	
1924	Fresno State	7–2	3–0	T–1st	
Fresno State Bulldogs (Far Western Conference) (1925–1928)
1925	Fresno State	2–6–1	0–4	5th	
1926	Fresno State	5–3–1	1–2–1	T–3rd	
1927	Fresno State	3–3–2	2–1–1	T–2nd	
1928	Fresno State	2–5–1	0–3–1	5th	
Fresno State:		36–26–7	11–10–4		
Total:		36–26–7			
National championship Conference title Conference division title or championship game berth
