= 1925 Chico State Wildcats football team =

American college football season

1925 Chico State Wildcats football

CCC champion
- Conference: California Coast Conference
- Record: 7–1 (5–0 CCC)
- Head coach: Art Acker (3rd season)
- Home stadium: College Field

1925 California Coast Conference football standings
	Conf.					Overall
Team	W		L		T	W		L		T
Chico State $	5	–	0	–	0	7	–	1	–	0
San Mateo			–					–
Modesto	3	–	3	–	0	3	–	6	–	1
Cal Poly	1	–	2	–	0	4	–	5	–	0
San Jose State	2	–	4	–	0	2	–	5	–	0
Bakersfield	0	–	1	–	0	0	–	1	–	0
Sacramento			–					–
Santa Rosa			–					–
$ – Conference champion; Includes forfeit by San Mateo to Chico State

The 1925 Chico State Wildcats football team represented Chico State Teachers College—now known as California State University, Chico—as a member of the California Coast Conference (CCC) during the 1925 college football season. Led by third-year head coach Art Acker, Chico State compiled an overall record of 7–1 with a mark of 5–0 in conference play, winning the CCC title for the second consecutive season. The team outscored its opponents 188 to 42 for the season. The Wildcats played home games at College Field in Chico, California.

== Schedule ==
Date	Opponent	Site	Result	Source
October 9	at St. Ignatius (CA)*	Ewing Field; San Francisco, CA	W 23–0	
October 16	at Santa Rosa	Bailey Field; Santa Rosa, CA	W 45–0	
October 24	at Pacific (CA)*	C.O.P. Field; Stockton, CA	L 7–25	
October 31	Sacramento	College Field; Chico, CA	W 6–3	
November 7	San Jose State	College Field; Chico, CA	W 53–0	
November 11	Mare Island Marines*	College Field; Chico, CA	W 8–7	
November 21	Modesto	College Field; Chico, CA	W 40–0	
November 26	San Mateo	College Field; Chico, CA	W 6–7 (forfeit win)	
*Non-conference game
