= 1925 Cal Poly Mustangs football team =

American college football season

1925 Cal Poly Mustangs football
- Conference: California Coast Conference
- Record: 4–5 (–2 CCC)
- Head coach: Al Agosti (5th season)

1925 California Coast Conference football standings
	Conf.					Overall
Team	W		L		T	W		L		T
Chico State $	5	–	0	–	0	7	–	1	–	0
San Mateo			–					–
Modesto	3	–	3	–	0	3	–	6	–	1
Cal Poly	1	–	2	–	0	4	–	5	–	0
San Jose State	2	–	4	–	0	2	–	5	–	0
Bakersfield	0	–	1	–	0	0	–	1	–	0
Sacramento			–					–
Santa Rosa			–					–
$ – Conference champion; Includes forfeit by San Mateo to Chico State

The 1925 Cal Poly Mustangs football team represented California Polytechnic School—now known as California Polytechnic State University, San Luis Obispo—as a member of the California Coast Conference (CCC) during the 1925 college football season. Led by fifth-year head coach Al Agosti, Cal Poly compiled an overall record of 4–5 with a mark of 1–2 in conference play. The team outscored its opponents 110 to 81 for the season. The Mustangs played home games in San Luis Obispo, California.

Cal Poly was a two-year school until 1941.

== Schedule ==
Date	Opponent	Site	Result	Source
September 26	San Luis Obispo High School*	San Luis Obispo, CA	W 18–0	
October 3	at Lompoc High School*	Lompoc, CA	W 41–0	
October 10	at Ventura*	Ventura, CA	W 10–7	
October 17	at Stanford JV*	Palo Alto, CA	L 19–20	
October 24	Modesto	San Luis Obispo, CA	L 0–13	
October 31	Bakersfield	San Luis Obispo, CA	W 1–0 (forfeit win)	
November 7	Santa Maria High School*	San Luis Obispo, CA	L 12–15	
November 14	at Santa Barbara State*	Bartlett Field; Santa Barbara, CA	L 0–6	
November 20	at San Jose State	Spartan Field; San Jose, CA	L 9–20	
*Non-conference game
