= Montgomery High School (Brownville, Alabama) =

School in Brownville, Alabama, USA

Montgomery School

Location
- Mormon Road; Brownville, Tuscaloosa County, Alabama; United States

Information
- Former name: Montgomery Senior High School
- School type: Public
- Established: 1939
- Status: Closed
- Closed: 1958
- School district: Tuscaloosa County Schools
- Faculty: 13 (as of 1951)
- Grades: 1–12 (at peak as a high school)
- Enrollment: 364 (as of 1951)
- Campus size: 6 acres
- Campus type: Rural
- Accreditation: Achieved in 1951 (secondary level)
- Feeder to: Northside High School

In 1939, a four-room school building was erected in the outlying Brownville, Alabama, community on land donated by a man named Richard Montgomery, consolidating several smaller community schools into Montgomery School, it is now behind the Samantha Volunteer Fire Dept. on Mormon Road, which is off of highway 171 in the western part of Tuscaloosa County.

The school received accreditation status in 1951, allowing it to become Montgomery Senior High School and allowing the older students to cut down extensive time in commuting to Tuscaloosa County High School in Northport, Alabama. At that point the school had expanded to a dozen rooms with a faculty of 13 and a total enrollment of 364 students.

Unfortunately in 1958, citing that both Montgomery High and Gorgas High schools would lose accreditation based on declining enrollment, the Tuscaloosa County Board of Education announced plans to build Northside High School in the community of Samantha. The entire board of Montgomery High School trustees resigned and three hundred petitioners fought the closure of Montgomery High in court, but lost.

Northside High was opened later in 1958, in the building that currently houses Northside Middle School. Montgomery Elementary School continued to operate, but eventually was also closed.

As of 2016, the six-acre site of the historic school was just leased by the school board to the Tuscaloosa Parks and Recreation for the next 25 years and is slated to become the Brownville Community Park. Revival of the old baseball field and basketball courts are the first planned improvements announced.
