= Earl Wight =

American college sports coach (1891–1973)

Biographical details
- Born: 1891
- Died: January 29, 1973 (aged 82); Fresno, California, U.S.
- Education: UC Berkeley (M.A., 1920)

Coaching career (HC unless noted)

Football
- 1944: Fresno State

Basketball
- 1919–1920: California (freshmen)
- 1920–1924: California

Baseball
- 1944–1946: Fresno State

Administrative career (AD unless noted)
- 1924–1947: Fresno State

Head coaching record
- Overall: 0–6 (football); 64–20 (basketball)

Earl Hervie Wight (1891 – January 29, 1973) was an American college football, college basketball, and college baseball coach and athletics administrator. He served as the head football coach at Fresno State Normal School—now known as California State University, Fresno—in 1944, compiling a record of 0–6. Wight was also the head basketball coach at the University of California, Berkeley from 1920 to 1924, tallying a mark of 64–20. He was hired by Fresno State in 1924 as athletic director and served in that role until 1947. Wight attended Pomona College in Claremont, California, where he played football, basketball, and baseball. He also earned a master's degree from the University of California, Berkeley in 1920.

Wight died at age 82, on January 29, 1973, in Fresno, California.

== Head coaching record ==
=== Football ===
| Year | Team | Overall | Conference | Standing | Bowl/playoffs |
|---|---|---|---|---|---|
Fresno State Bulldogs (Independent) (1944)
| 1944 | Fresno State | 0–6 | | | |
| Fresno State: | | 0–6 | | | |
| Total: | | 0–6 | | | |
