= 1922 Fresno State Bulldogs football team =

American college football season

1922 Fresno State Bulldogs football

CCC champion

CCC Championship Game, W 12–7 vs. Pacific (CA)
- Conference: California Coast Conference
- Southern Division
- Record: 7–1–2 (2–0–1 CCC)
- Head coach: Arthur W. Jones (2nd season)

1922 California Coast Conference football standings
	Conf.					Overall
Team	W		L		T	W		L		T
Fresno State $	2	–	0	–	1	7	–	1	–	2
Pacific (CA)	3	–	0	–	0	6	–	1	–	0
Chico State	2	–	1	–	0	5	–	3	–	0
Modesto	2	–	2	–	1	2	–	3	–	4
Loyola (CA)	1	–	1	–	0	3	–	4	–	1
Sacramento	0	–	1	–	0	?	–	?	–	?
Cal Poly	0	–	2	–	0	1	–	3	–	0
San Jose State	0	–	3	–	0	2	–	5	–	1
$ – Conference champion

The 1922 Fresno State Bulldogs football team represented Fresno State Normal School—now known as California State University, Fresno—during the 1922 college football season.

Fresno State competed in the California Coast Conference (CCC) from 1922 to 1924. The 1922 team was led by head coach Arthur W. Jones in his second year at the helm. They finished as champion of the CCC, with a record of seven wins, one loss and two ties (7–1–2, 2–0–1 CCC). The Bulldogs outscored their opponents 124–51 for the season.

== Schedule ==
Date	Opponent	Site	Result
October 6	at Tulare High School*	Tulare, CA	W 12–0
October 7	at Lemoore High School*	Lemoore, CA	W 25–9
October 14	Modesto	Fresno, CA	T 0–0
October 21	at Loyola (CA)	Los Angeles, CA	W 0–2 (forfeit win)
October 28	at Stanford JV*	Stanford, CA	L 3–27
November 4	Cal Poly	Fresno, CA	W 20–0
November 9	at Bakersfield*	Bakersfield, CA	W 31–6
November 11 ?	Reedley High School*	Fresno, CA	W 21–0
November 18	Cal Aggies*	Fresno, CA	T 0–0
December 9	Pacific (CA)*	Fire/Police Baseball Park; Fresno, CA (CCC Championship)	W 12–7
*Non-conference game
