= Ken Gleason =

American football player

Playing career

Football
- 1935–1937: Fresno State
- c. 1943: Saint Mary's Pre-Flight
- Position: Fullback

Coaching career (HC unless noted)

Football
- 1938: Fowler HS (CA)
- 1945: Hutchinson NAS
- 1946: Fresno State (assistant)
- 1947–1948: Fresno State

Baseball
- 1947: Fresno State

Head coaching record
- Overall: 6–12–3 (college football); 9–20 (college baseball)

Kenneth Gleason was an American football player and coach of football and baseball. He served as the head football coach at Fresno State College—now known as California State University, Fresno—from 1947 to 1948, compiling a record of 6–12–3. Bradshaw was also the head baseball coach as Fresno state in 1947, tallying a mark of 9–20. A native of Santa Cruz, California, he played college football at Fresno State, lettering as a fullback from 1935 to 1937. In 1938, Bradshaw was appointed head football coach at Fowler High School in Fowler, California. During World War II, he served in the United States Navy, playing with the Saint Mary's Pre-Flight Air Devils football team before coaching undefeated football team in 1945 at a naval air station in Hutchinson, Kansas. He returned to Fresno State in 1946 as an assistant football coach, working under head coach James Bradshaw.

== Head coaching record ==
=== College football ===
Year	Team	Overall	Conference	Standing	Bowl/playoffs
Fresno State Bulldogs (California Collegiate Athletic Association) (1947–1948)
1947	Fresno State	3–6–2	2–1–2	3rd	
1948	Fresno State	3–6–1	2–3	T–3rd	
Fresno State:		6–12–3	4–4–2		
Total:		6–12–3			
