= Fresno State Bulldogs football =

American varsity football team

2026 Fresno State Bulldogs football team
- First season: 1921; 105 years ago
- Athletic director: Garrett Klassy
- Head coach: Matt Entz; 2nd season, 13–5 (.722)
- Location: Fresno, California
- Stadium: Valley Children's Stadium (capacity: 41,000)
- Field: Jim Sweeney Field
- NCAA division: Division I FBS
- Conference: Pac-12
- Colors: Cardinal red and blue
- All-time record: 660–457–27 (.589)
- Bowl record: 18–15 (.545)

Conference championships
- CCC: 1922, 1923 FWC: 1930, 1934, 1935, 1937 CCAA: 1941, 1954, 1955, 1956, 1958, 1959, 1960, 1961, 1968 Big West: 1977, 1982, 1985, 1988, 1989, 1991 WAC: 1992, 1993, 1999 MW: 2012, 2013, 2018, 2022

Division championships
- MW West: 2013, 2014, 2017, 2018, 2022
- Consensus All-Americans: 2
- Rivalries: Boise State (rivalry); Hawaii (rivalry); San Diego State (rivalry); San Jose State (rivalry)
- Fight song: Fight Varsity
- Mascot: TimeOut, Victor E. Bulldog IV
- Marching band: Fresno State Bulldog Marching Band
- Outfitter: Adidas
- Website: GoBulldogs.com

The Fresno State Bulldogs football team represents California State University, Fresno, in NCAA Division I FBS college football as a member of the Pac-12 Conference (Pac-12). The green "V" on the Bulldogs' helmets, uniforms, and playing field symbolizes California's Central Valley, specifically the San Joaquin Valley, the agricultural valley from which they draw their support.

== History ==
=== Early history ===
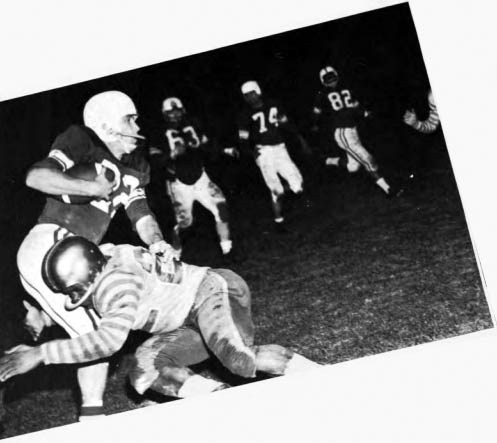
Fresno State (dark jersey) v Cal Poly in 1955

Football was first played on the Fresno campus in 1921, and for its first year it played as an independent. The Bulldogs joined the California Coast Conference, which included several regional opponents the next year, and moved to the Northern California Athletic Conference of which it was among the charter schools in 1925. These early years laid the foundations of rivalries to come, with games against San Jose State and Pacific in the first year, and adding UC Davis, Nevada, and San Diego State in the following years of NCAC play.

The NCAA began classifying schools into University Division and College Division groups in 1937, and the Bulldogs, along with the other major college schools in the conference, broke off into the California Collegiate Athletic Association in 1939, a conference it remained in until joining the Pacific Coast Athletic Association, later known as the Big West Conference, in 1969.

Notable coaches during this period include Cecil Coleman, who during his five years at Fresno State had a .760 winning percentage. Coleman took the 1961 team to an undefeated season, capped by a 36–6 Mercy Bowl victory over Bowling Green State.

Fresno State football experienced a stretch of seasons hovering around the .500 mark during the later 1960s and 70s. Yet despite also having a number of winning seasons, including two where the Bulldogs went undefeated, they only participated in two University Division bowl games before the 1980s.

=== The Sweeney eras (1976–1977, 1980–1996) ===
In 1976, Jim Sweeney took over a Bulldog squad that had had 8 winning seasons since its last bowl bid, and promptly took the 1977 squad to a 9–2 record in his second year as head coach. The Sweeney era bristled with confidence as the Bulldogs became, along with rival San Jose State, the class of the Big West, earning postseason bowl berths four times in the 1980s. Sweeney's 1985 squad is particularly memorable for Bulldog fans, as the team finished as the only unbeaten Division I-A team in the country, ranked 16th in the coaches poll. The 1985 squad did not, however, finish untied, after a 24–24 tie at home against the Rainbow clad Warriors of Hawaii. The lone blemish to a perfect season, coupled with the difficulty either team has had in winning in the other's home stadium, has led the Warriors and Bulldogs to contend for one of the WAC's fiercest rivalries.

The face of Fresno State football changed with the construction of Bulldog Stadium for the 1980 season. Before then, the Bulldogs played their home games in Fresno City College's Ratcliffe Stadium, which seated approximately 13,000 fans. The construction of a modern new on-campus stadium which held over 30,000 in attendance was an outstanding improvement for the Bulldogs, who saw drastic increases in attendance and alumni support. The new stadium brought with it a renewed success for the football team, as they enjoyed four Big West championships in the new stadium which took them to five California Bowl appearances against opponents from the Mid-American Conference. During the Sweeney era, the Bulldogs posted nine consecutive winning seasons, a run which included five double-digit win seasons. 1994, however, marked the beginning of three consecutive losing seasons which ended the Sweeney era and brought in Pat Hill, who had worked both in the NFL and colleges for the past several decades—including a stint as an assistant under Sweeney from 1984 to 1989.

=== Pat Hill era (1997–2011) ===
Under Hill, Fresno State continued the advances it had made during the Sweeney era. Soon after returning to Fresno, Hill declared that his Bulldogs would play "anybody, anywhere, anytime." He recalled that this was the same blueprint Bobby Bowden followed in turning Florida State into a powerhouse. To that end, Hill's Bulldogs frequently played particularly difficult non-conference schedules against elite, highly ranked teams. The Bulldogs have also been the only BCS non-AQ conference school to record three consecutive bowl victories over schools from BCS conferences.

In 1998, the Bulldogs, under Hill took on all comers and had a strong season led by WAC offensive player of the year Jaime Kimbrough. In 2001, the Bulldogs, and quarterback David Carr, began their season with several upsets of ranked teams. The Bulldogs opened the season in Boulder against the Colorado Buffaloes, leaving with a 24–22 win over the eventual Big 12 champions. The next game of the 2001 season was at home against the Oregon State Beavers, the team that Sports Illustrated had been picked as its preseason No. 1. In an electric game at Bulldog Stadium, the Bulldogs outplayed the Beavers in a 44–24 rout. Fresno State then headed to Madison to take on the Wisconsin Badgers, winners of the Sun Bowl over UCLA the previous year. The Bulldogs also topped the Badgers by a score of 32–20. These victories, followed by wins over Tulsa, Louisiana Tech, and Colorado State led the Bulldogs to a ranking of No. 8 in the polls, the highest for a mid-major team since(BYU was ranked No. 5 in 1996), and earned the Bulldogs a degree of prestige not usually afforded a mid-major program. This changed abruptly, however, when the Boise State Broncos and Hawaii Rainbows upset the Bulldogs in Fresno and Honolulu respectively to smash the Bulldogs' hopes of playing in a BCS bowl. The defeats led the team instead the Silicon Valley Classic against Michigan State, a game which was taken by the Spartans by a score of 44–35. Nonetheless, the impressive performances of the regular season earned Fresno State its first number one overall NFL draft choice in David Carr, picked first by the expansion Houston Texans.

The 2002 squad, which had difficulty opening the season with a 1–3 record, finished strong to finish the regular season 8–5 and earning another bid to the Silicon Valley Classic against Georgia Tech. This resulted in a win for the Bulldogs, who beat the Yellow Jackets 30–21.

The 2003 squad earned a spot in the Silicon Valley Classic for the third year in a row, this time facing UCLA in San Jose. The Bulldogs defeated the Bruins 17–9.

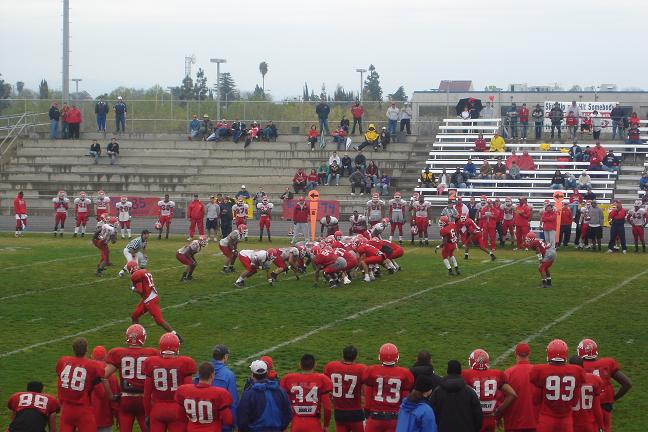
Spring 2007 scrimmage in Visalia

The 2004 season began for the Bulldogs much as the 2001 season had, with surprising upsets over BCS opponents in their home stadiums. The Bulldogs opened the season at Husky Stadium against Washington, a team with high expectations in its second year with head coach Keith Gilbertson. The Bulldogs came away with the win by a score of 35–16. The second game was against the Big 12 champions, the Kansas State Wildcats, who had beaten the No. 1 ranked Oklahoma Sooners to finish the previous year. The Bulldogs walked out of Manhattan with an unexpected 45–21 win, again earning the squad national attention and a ranking in the polls. Again, similarly to the 2001 season, the Bulldogs unexpectedly lost to Louisiana Tech, followed by two more losses, including to newly cemented rival Boise State. However, the Bulldogs found their redemptive qualities pervading in five straight wins by 40 or more points, including a 70–14 home rout over rival Hawaiʻi, to earn a bid to the MPC Computers Bowl. In the MPC Bowl, the Bulldogs won their third straight bowl victory against a BCS conference team, beating the Virginia Cavaliers 37–34 in overtime.

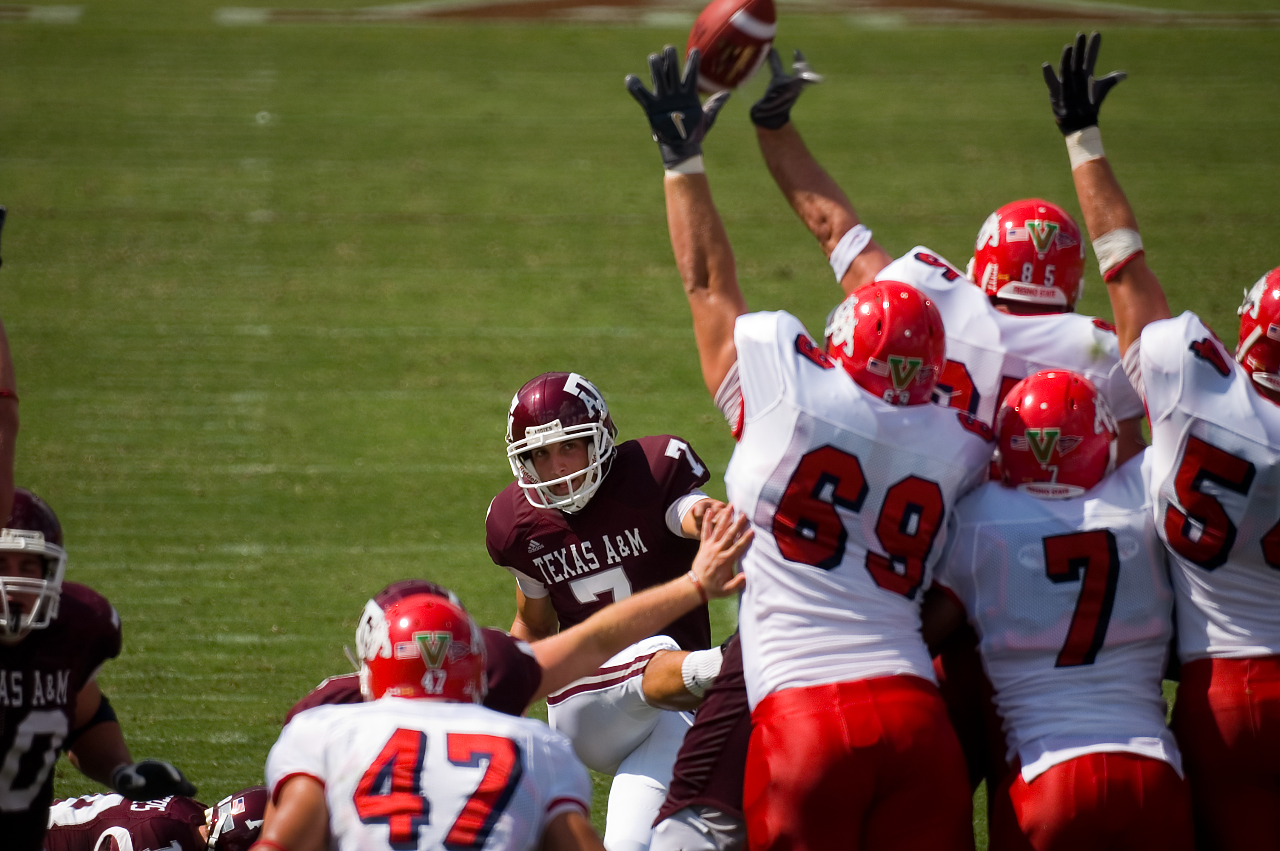
The Bulldogs block a field goal against the Texas A&M Aggies in a 2007 trip to College Station, Texas

The 2005 season began with heady expectations which the Bulldogs largely lived up to for much of the season. The 2005 squad, after an early 3-point loss to Oregon in Eugene, rallied to win seven straight, including the first win at Hawaiʻi since 1994, and a redemptive home victory over Boise State, traveled to the Los Angeles Coliseum to face the No. 1 ranked USC Trojans, bringing with them an 8–1 record, a ranking of No. 16, and senior leadership and depth at key positions. The match up against USC turned out to be one for the ages as Fresno State quarterback Paul Pinegar continually drew against USC quarterback Matt Leinart, and Fresno State running backs Wendel Mathis and Bryson Sumlin exchanged touchdown runs with eventual Heisman Trophy winner Reggie Bush. Despite taking a halftime lead and trading scores with the Trojans all night, at the end of regulation, USC's athleticism with Reggie Bush, the Bulldogs lost by a score of 42–50. The loss to the Trojans changed the character of the team, who proceeded to lose their next four games, including the Liberty Bowl against Tulsa.

The 2006 squad, weakened by key senior losses at quarterback, running back and on the defense, struggled with the schedule, opening the year 1–7 before winning three straight, only to close the season with the first loss to San Jose State since before the fall of the Soviet Union.

After a disappointing season in 2006, the 2007 Fresno State Bulldogs bounced back, finishing 9–4. They started strong against a weak Sacramento State team before losing a close game at Texas A&M in triple overtime. After another loss to Oregon, they won 8 of their final 10 games, including a victory over Georgia Tech in the Humanitarian Bowl.

On September 1, 2008, the Bulldogs opened their season with a 24–7 victory over Rutgers in a non-conference game. The Bulldogs would end the season with a 7–6 record, including a loss in the New Mexico Bowl against Colorado State.

The 2009 season begin with high hopes as Fresno State dominated its first opponent, UC Davis. However, the Bulldogs would go on to lose three straight games against Wisconsin, Boise State, and Cincinnati. The Bulldogs would rebound to win their next five games, before falling to rival Nevada. The Bulldogs would also go on to beat Illinois, in one of the more memorable college football games of the year. The Bulldogs scored a touchdown with only seconds left. Down by one point, the Bulldogs decided to go for two rather than kick a field goal to tie it up. With time expiring, Fresno State QB Ryan Colburn was forced to throw the ball into the end zone. The ball was deflected by an Illinois player, and caught by Fresno State offensive lineman Devan Cunningham who barreled his way into the end zone for a two-point conversion. The Bulldogs won 53–52. This miraculous play has been dubbed by many as the "remarkable deflection". The Bulldogs would end the season at 8–5 including a loss to Wyoming in the New Mexico Bowl. However, Ryan Mathews had one of his best seasons to date, rushing for 1,800 yards, and scoring 19 touchdowns. Ryan Mathews declared his eligibility for the NFL draft, and was selected 12th over-all by the San Diego Chargers.

Much like the 2009 season, the 2010 season saw its share of highs and lows. The Bulldogs would start the season off with a victory over Cincinnati. However, they'd go on to lose against the upper half of the WAC conference and finish the regular season at 8–3. The Bulldogs accepted an invite to face Northern Illinois in the Humanitarian Bowl. It marked the third straight year that Fresno State would face a fellow non-AQ program in a bowl game. The Bulldogs would lose the game to Northern Illinois adding to its disappointing bowl record against other non-AQ programs.

=== Tim DeRuyter era (2012–2016) ===
On December 5, 2011, after finishing the year 4–9, Fresno State announced that Pat Hill had been fired as the head coach of the football program. On December 14, 2011, Tim DeRuyter, defensive coordinator and interim head coach of Texas A&M was introduced as the new head coach. He led the Bulldogs to back-to-back conference championships in his first two years with Derek Carr playing as quarterback. DeRuyter was then given a five-year contract extension and Carr was drafted by the Oakland Raiders at 36th overall in 2014. With Carr gone, the Bulldogs would rotate through several quarterbacks and would finish with losing records the next two seasons. After opening the 2016 season with a 1–7 record, DeRuyter was fired.

=== Jeff Tedford era (2017–2019) ===
The Bulldogs announced it had hired former Cal head coach, former quarterback under Coach Jim Sweeney, former Bulldogs offensive coordinator, and Fresno State alumnus Jeff Tedford to be its next head coach beginning with the 2017 season. In his first season as Fresno State's head coach, Coach Tedford led the Bulldogs to a 10–4 season, including wins over rivals San Diego State and the No. 25 Boise State Broncos. They clinched the MW West Division, but would lose to Boise State 14–17 in the MW Championship game. Fresno State got an invite to participate in the 2017 Hawaii Bowl, to face the University of Houston Cougars. The Bulldogs would win their bowl game with a score of 33–27, ending a six-year bowl drought. Fresno State would the end the season at 10–4, making it one of the best turnarounds in college football. In 2018, Fresno State made back-to-back conference championship appearances, facing Boise State in a rematch of the previous championship game; this time defeating Boise State 19–16 in overtime. They faced the Arizona State Sun Devils in the 2018 Las Vegas Bowl, winning 20–31. Their victory over Arizona State gave Fresno State the first 12-win season in school history. The team suffered a setback in 2019, finishing 4–8 overall and 2–6 in conference play. On December 6, 2019, Tedford announced his resignation from Fresno State after 3 seasons for health reasons.

=== Kalen DeBoer era (2020–2021) ===
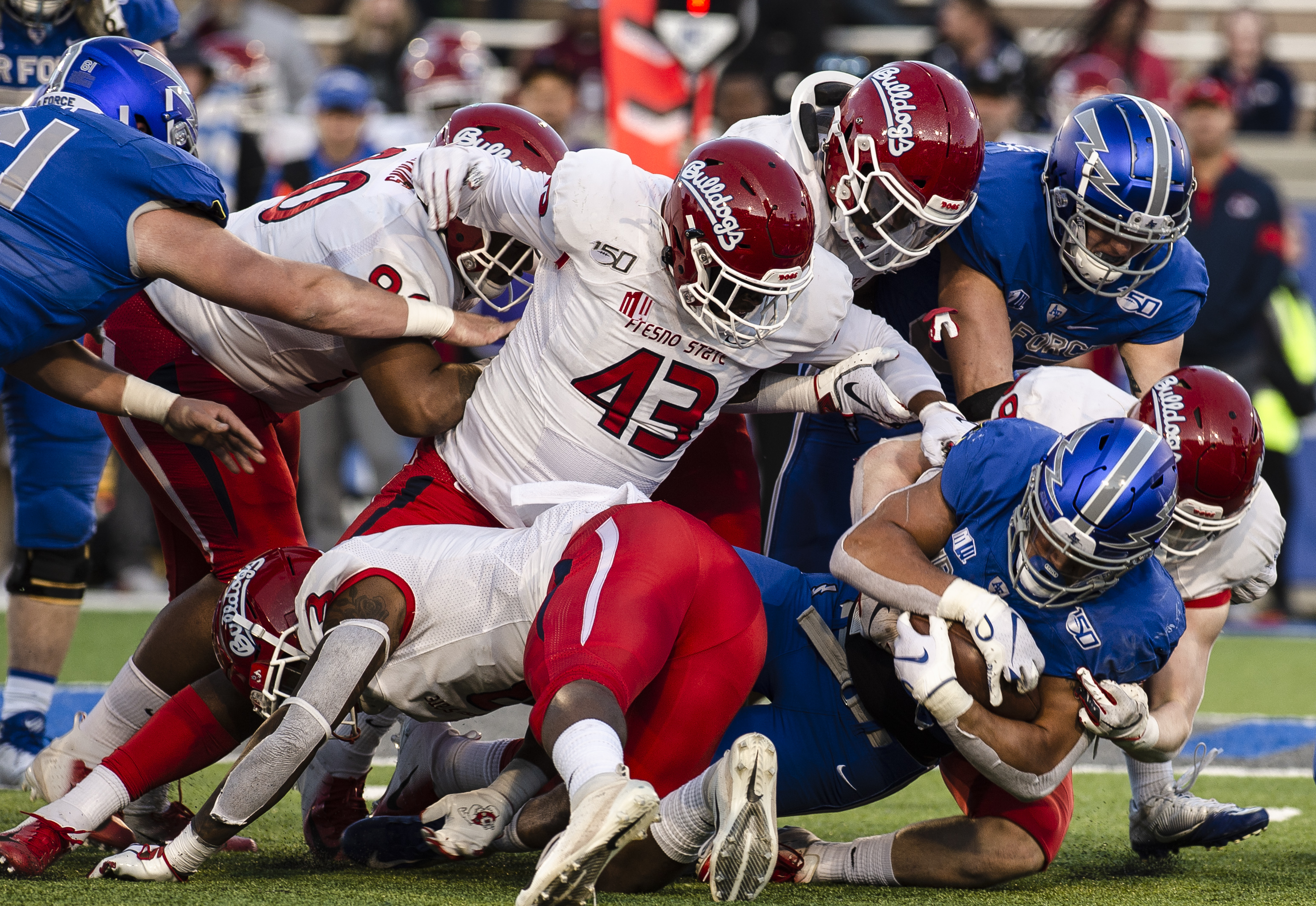
Fresno State defenders tackle an Air Force ballcarrier during a 2019 game

On December 17, 2019, former Fresno State offensive coordinator Kalen DeBoer, who had spent the 2019 season at Indiana, was hired as Tedford's replacement.

On September 18, 2021, the Bulldogs beat #13 UCLA Bruins 40–37. It is the second highest ranked opponent ever defeated by Fresno State.

On November 29, 2021, DeBoer left Fresno after 2 seasons for the head coaching job at Washington.

=== Tedford's return (2022–2024) ===
Tedford was rehired on December 8, 2021, for the 2022 season. Under Tedford, the Bulldogs won another Mountain West championship and beat Washington State in the Jimmy Kimmel LA Bowl.

The Bulldogs' 2023 home opener against Eastern Washington was historically significant as the first FBS game with linear television coverage exclusively in Spanish, with UniMás televising the game in the Fresno and Bakersfield markets. English-language coverage was exclusively by streaming, with audio being a simulcast of Fresno State's (English) radio broadcast.

=== Tedford Resignation, Tim Skipper becomes Interim Coach (2024) ===
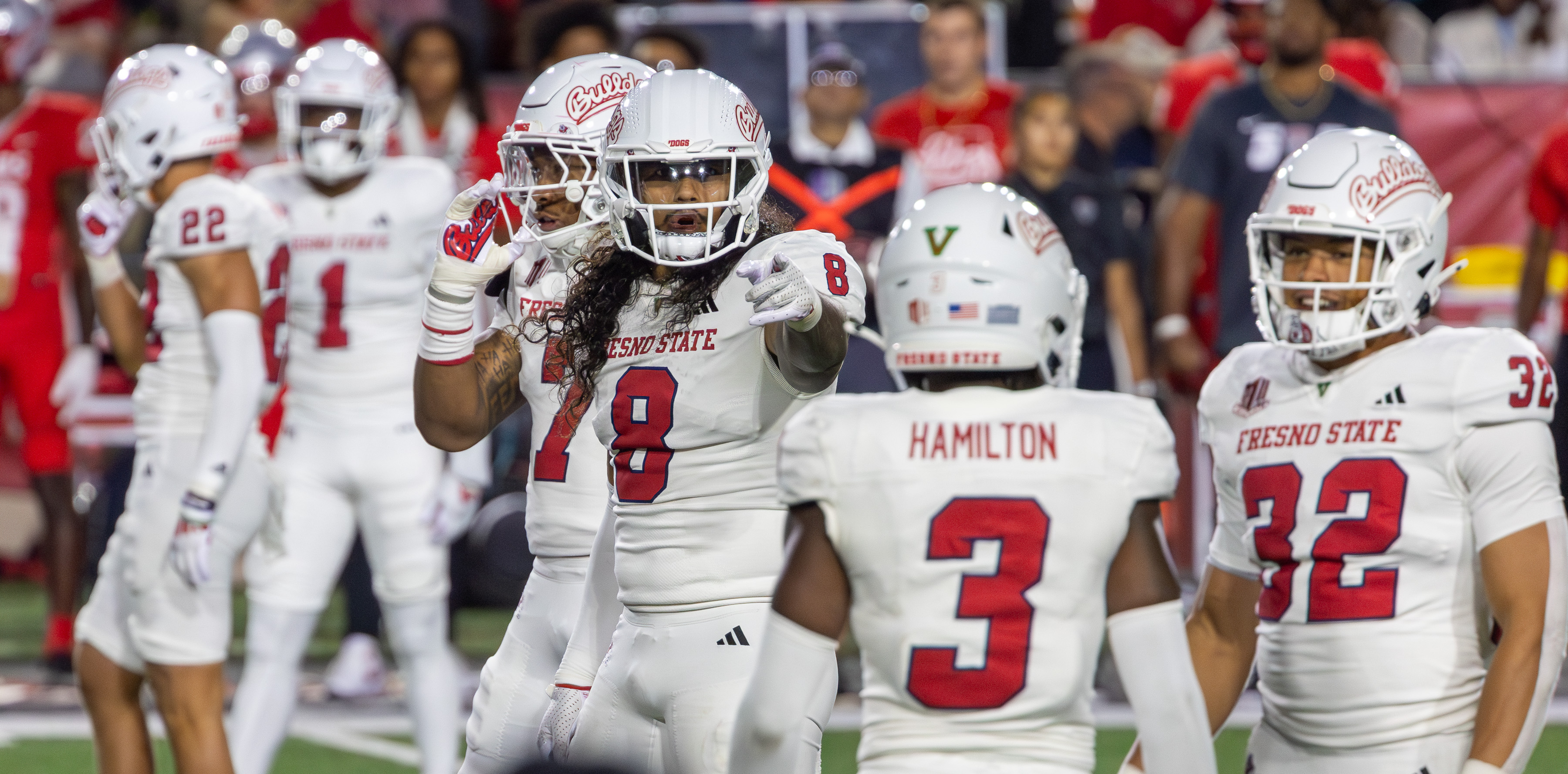
2024 players Phoenix Jackson, Tuasivi Nomura (pointing), Al'zillion Hamilton, and Dean Clark

On July 15, 2024, Tedford resigned as head coach once again, citing health reasons. Assistant head coach and linebackers coach Tim Skipper stepped in as interim head coach for the 2024 season. Skipper had previously served as the acting head coach while Tedford was away for the 2023 Isleta New Mexico Bowl. He also played his collegiate career at Fresno State, a four-year starter at middle linebacker from 1997 to 2000. Fresno State started off its 2024 campaign against the defending national champion Michigan Wolverines at Michigan Stadium, losing 30–10. The Bulldogs finished the season 6–6.

=== Matt Entz era (2024-) ===
On December 4, 2024, Fresno State announced the hiring of former North Dakota State Bison football coach Matt Entz.

== Conference affiliations ==
- Independent (1921, 1942–1945, 1951–1952)
- California Coast Conference (1922–1924)
- Far Western Conference (1925–1939)
  - Dual conference membership in FWC and CCAA in 1939
- California Collegiate Athletic Association (1939–1941, 1946–1950, and 1953–1968)
- Big West Conference (1969–1991) (formerly Pacific Coast Athletic Association 1969–1987)
- Western Athletic Conference (1992–2011)
- Mountain West Conference (2012–2025)
- Pac-12 Conference (2026–present)

== Championships ==
=== Conference championships ===
Fresno State has won 28 conference championships through the 2024 season.

Year	Conference	Coach	Overall record	Conference record
1922	California Coast Conference	Arthur W. Jones	7–1–2	2–0–1
1923	California Coast Conference	Arthur W. Jones	7–2	3–0
1930	Far Western Conference	Stanley Borleske	8–0	5–0
1934†	Far Western Conference	Leo Harris	7–2–1	3–0–1
1935	Far Western Conference	Leo Harris	6–3	4–0
1937	Far Western Conference	James Bradshaw	8–1–1	4–0
1941	California Collegiate Athletic Association	James Bradshaw	4–3–2	2–0–1
1954	California Collegiate Athletic Association	Clark Van Galder	7–3	4–0
1955	California Collegiate Athletic Association	Clark Van Galder	9–1	2–0
1956	California Collegiate Athletic Association	Clark Van Galder	8–2	2–0
1958	California Collegiate Athletic Association	Clark Van Galder	5–5	4–1
1959	California Collegiate Athletic Association	Cecil Coleman	7–3	5–0
1960	California Collegiate Athletic Association	Cecil Coleman	9–1	5–0
1961	California Collegiate Athletic Association	Cecil Coleman	10–0	5–0
1968	California Collegiate Athletic Association	Darryl Rogers	7–4	4–0
1977	Pacific Coast Athletic Association	Jim Sweeney	9–2	4–0
1982	Pacific Coast Athletic Association	Jim Sweeney	11–1	6–0
1985	Pacific Coast Athletic Association	Jim Sweeney	11–0–1	7–0
1988	Big West Conference	Jim Sweeney	10–2	7–0
1989	Big West Conference	Jim Sweeney	11–1	7–0
1991†	Big West Conference	Jim Sweeney	10–2	6–1
1992†	Western Athletic Conference	Jim Sweeney	9–4	6–2
1993†	Western Athletic Conference	Jim Sweeney	9–4	6–2
1999†	Western Athletic Conference	Pat Hill	8–5	5–2
2012†	Mountain West Conference	Tim DeRuyter	9–4	7–1
2013	Mountain West Conference	Tim DeRuyter	11–2	7–1
2018	Mountain West Conference	Jeff Tedford	12–2	7–1
2022	Mountain West Conference	Jeff Tedford	10–4	7–1

† Co-champions

=== Division championships ===
Year	Conference	Coach	Overall record	Conference record	Opponent	CG result
2013	MW West	Tim DeRuyter	11–2	7–1	Utah State	W, 24–17
2014†	MW West	Tim DeRuyter	6–8	5–3	Boise State	L, 14–28
2017	MW West	Jeff Tedford	10–4	7–1	Boise State	L, 14–17
2018	MW West	Jeff Tedford	12–2	7–1	Boise State	W, 19–16^{OT}
2022	MW West	Jeff Tedford	10–4	7–1	Boise State	W, 28–16

† Co-champion

== Rankings ==
Fresno State football has finished Top 25 in the nation per the AP poll 4 times in school history.

1992	2004	2018	2022
24	22	18	24

== Head coaches ==
Current Fresno State Football Head Coach, Matt Entz.

Coach	Years	Seasons	Record	Pct.
Arthur W. Jones	1921–1928	8	36–26–7	.572
Stanley Borleske	1929–1932	4	16–18–2	.472
Leo Harris	1933–1935	3	18–9–1	.661
James Bradshaw	1936–1942; 1946	7, 1	59–18–2	.759
Earl Wight	1944	1	0–6	.000
Alvin Pierson	1945, 1949	1, 1	7–14–2	.348
Ken Gleason	1947–1948	2	6–12–3	.357
Duke Jacobs	1950–1951	2	7–11–1	.395
Clark Van Galder	1952–1958	7	46–22–2	.671
Cecil Coleman	1959–1963	5	38–12	.760
Phil Krueger	1964–1965	2	10–10	.500
Darryl Rogers	1966–1972	7	42–32–1	.567
J. R. Boone	1973–1975	3	10–25	.286
Jim Sweeney	1976–1977; 1980–1996	2, 17	144–75–3	.655
Bob Padilla	1978–1979	2	7–15–0	.318
Pat Hill	1997–2011	15	112–80	.583
Tim DeRuyter	2012–2016	5	30–30	.500
Eric Kiesau†	2016	1	0–4	.000
Jeff Tedford	2017–2019; 2022–2023	3, 2	45–22	.672
Kalen DeBoer	2020–2021	2	12–6	.667
Lee Marks†	2021	1	1–0	1.000
Tim Skipper†	2024	1	7–7	.538
Matt Entz	2025–present	1	9–4	.692

† Interim

== Rivalries ==
=== Boise State ===
The Battle of the Milk Can

The Boise State-Fresno State rivalry originated in 1977. The Milk Can is awarded to each season's winner of the Battle of the Milk Can, a college football game between the Fresno State Bulldogs and the Boise State Broncos. The team who wins the Milk Can gets to keep it for a year. The trophy was created in 2005, but was not ready in time for the annual match in Fresno, which was won by the Bulldogs. It made its first appearance in 2006, when the victorious Broncos carried it off the field. The idea for a trophy as the prize for the newly arranged interstate rivalry was hatched by two separate dairy groups that decided to get involved with their local football programs. California (No. 1) and Idaho (No. 4) are two of the nation's leading dairy producers. The South Valley Dairy Group began raising money for Bulldog football in 2001; the Bronco Dairy Boosters began contributing to Boise State in 2005. Two dairymen and friends in these organizations, Dan Van Grouw of Meridian, Idaho (in the Boise metropolitan area) and Roger Fluegel of Visalia, California (in Fresno State's home of the San Joaquin Valley), put forward the idea of a traveling trophy and began the administrative process. There was positive feedback from the teams, coaches, and fans, but an "administrative changeover" kept the trophy off the field for the 2005 game, though the Bulldogs' 27–7 victory is the first listed on the can.

=== Hawaii ===
The rivalry with Hawaii has increased greatly in recent years, with both teams being the oldest members of the WAC contending regularly for the conference championship. Coaches from both schools have accused each side of various episodes of poor sportsmanship over the years, and both schools have some of the nation's rowdiest home fans. The rivalry has featured some lopsided results, including a 70–14 Fresno victory over Hawaii in 2004 and a 68–37 Warriors victory in 2006 over Fresno. In 2007, allegations that Fresno State fans were physically and verbally abused by hometown Hawaii fans circulated the internet and television media added to this rivalry. The game is no longer an annual affair; the two teams are no longer designated as annual opponents in the MW's post-2022 divisionless scheduling model.

=== San Diego State ===
The Battle for the Old Oil Can

The Fresno State-San Diego State rivalry, also known as the Battle for the Oil Can, is one of the Bulldogs' biggest rivalry games. This in-state rivalry dates back to 1923, with the Aztecs winning the initial meeting at home 12–2. Since then, the sides have met 51 more times, including every year from 1945 to 1979, when the two competed in the same conference or were independents. After not facing one another between 1979 and 1991, the schools resumed the annual series from 1992 to 1998, when both were members of the Western Athletic Conference. The two teams have met twice since then, in 2002 and 2011. With Fresno State joining the Mountain West Conference in 2012 and the addition of the divisional format, the Aztecs and the Bulldogs will compete on an annual basis once again. The two teams play for the Old Oil Can as a trophy. The name comes from a 1930s-era oil can hailing from Fresno that was found at a construction site at San Diego State. "The oil can likely came from a time when Aztec and Bulldog fans traveled to football games between the two schools via the old, twisting, precipitous Grapevine section of Highway 99 over Tejon Pass", said Jacquelyn K. Glasener, executive director of the Fresno State Alumni Association. "Cars in those days carried extra oil and water to be sure they could make it through difficult trips", added Jim Herrick, executive director of the San Diego State Alumni Association. As of 2023, Fresno State trails in the series 27–31–4.

=== San Jose State ===
The Battle for the Valley Trophy

The Fresno State–San Jose State football rivalry started in 1921 and is the Bulldogs' oldest rival. San Jose State led the series from 1949 to 2001, but Fresno State tied it at 32 games each with a victory in 2002, and recaptured the lead in 2003. The Bulldogs have maintained the series lead since 2003, but have lost the past two games to the Spartans, including a 52–62 loss at Spartan Stadium (now CEFCU Stadium) on 11/29/2013. The Bulldogs and Spartans played the first football game of the series in 1921. The football rivalry took a one-year break in 2012 after conference realignment temporarily separated the two schools, with Fresno State moving to the Mountain West Conference while San Jose State remained in the Western Athletic Conference. It resumed as a conference rivalry in 2013 when San Jose State joined the MW, and the Spartans were designated as one of the Bulldogs' two permanent opponents in the MW's post-2022 divisionless scheduling model. As of 2023 Fresno State leads the 86-game series 44–39–3

=== Nevada ===
The Sierra Showdown

The 'Sierra Showdown' is named after the Sierra Nevada mountain range that runs along the California-Nevada border and is near the home cities of both schools (Fresno, California and Reno, Nevada). As recent as November 2022 there was case made for the Nevada-Fresno State football game to add a Sierra Showdown Trophy Paul Loeffler, the voice of the Fresno State Bulldogs, suggested on Twitter that Nevada and Fresno State should play for the Sierra Showdown Trophy that is half silver (for the Silver State) and half gold (for the Golden State). Loeffler was quoted as saying ""You guys are on the eastern side of the Sierra. You're looking at the other side of the mountains that we're looking at from the western side. We have to go through or over that pass to play each other. We've been doing it forever. So why not make that mountain the symbol of this rivalry?" The Wolf Pack and Bulldogs have played each other 55 times. The series began in 1923 and has been played every season since 1998. The 55 matchups are more games than Nevada has played its main rival, UNLV (49 times). Nevada is the other of Fresno State's two protected rivalries in the MW's post-2022 divisionless scheduling model, meaning they continue to play every year. Fresno State leads the all-time series 32–22–1 as of 2023, including a 16–11 mark since the teams began playing regularly again in 1994.

=== Cal Poly ===
Battle for the Victory Bell

From 1956 to 1975, Cal Poly and the Bulldogs traded the "Victory Bell Trophy", which was donated to Cal Poly in 1952. The trophy, which weighed about 200 pounds, was ultimately retired due to repeated theft. The two programs didn't play each other from 1986 through 2009, but brought back matchups in 2010, 2013, 2021 and 2022. In the 46-game all-time series, Fresno State leads 34–10–2.

=== Louisiana Tech ===
Battle for the Bone

From 2001 to 2011, Louisiana Tech and Fresno State played annually as members of the Western Athletic Conference. The two schools both feature Bulldogs as their mascots, hence the name "Battle for the Bone" was coined by Fresno State's 2001 Homecoming Chair, Terrance Mayes. In 2012 Fresno State left the Western Athletic Conference and joined the Mountain West Conference, effectively ending the rivalry. In the 13-game all-time series, Fresno State leads 9–4.

== Retired numbers ==
Fresno State Bulldogs retired numbers
No.	Player	Pos.	Tenure	Year retired	Ref.
4	Derek Carr	QB	2009–2013	2017	
8	David Carr	QB	1997–2001	2007	
9	Kevin Sweeney	QB	1983–1986		
12	Trent Dilfer	QB	1991–1993		
14	Vince Petrucci	K	1976–1978		
15	Davante Adams	WR	2011–2013	2022	
21	Dale Messer	WR	1958–1960		
22	Lorenzo Neal	RB	1990–1992	2022	
83	Henry Ellard	WR	1979–1982		

== Honors and notable people ==
=== All-Americans ===
Jackie Fellows, HB- 1942 (LK-1st; MS-1st)
Davante Adams, WR- 2013 (AP-2nd)

Sam Baugh Trophy

Sam Baugh Trophy
Year	Name	Position
1993	Trent Dilfer	Quarterback
2001	David Carr	Quarterback
2013	Derek Carr	Quarterback

This honor is given by the Touchdown Club of Columbus, awarded annually to the nation's top collegiate passer.

Paul Warfield Trophy

Paul Warfield Trophy
Year	Name	Position
2013	Davante Adams	Wide receiver

This honor is awarded annually to the nation's top collegiate wide receiver.

== All-time record vs. Pac-12 teams ==
Results as of the conclusion of the 2025 NCAA Division I FBS football season.

Opponent	Won	Lost	Tied	Percentage	Streak	First meeting
Boise State	10	17	0	.370	Won 3	1977
Colorado State	7	11	0	.389	Lost 1	1992
Oregon State	9	6	0	.600	Won 1	1981
San Diego State	27	32	4	.460	Lost 2	1923
Texas State	0	0	0	–	N/A	N/A
Utah State	19	14	1	.574	Lost 1	1952
Washington State	2	4	0	.333	Lost 1	1987
Totals	74	84	5	.469		

== Future non-conference opponents ==
Announced schedules as of October 2, 2026.

2027	2028	2029	2030	2031	2032	2033	2034	2035
Utah Tech	Stanford	at Stanford	at Texas Tech	at Kansas	UCLA	San Jose State	at San Jose State	San Jose State
at Washington	at USC	San Jose State	Kansas		at Texas Tech			
at Rice	Cal Poly				at San Jose State			
Sacramento State	at Georgia Southern							

== Bulldogs in the NFL ==
First round draft picks

Name	Position	Year	Overall pick	Team
James Williams	CB	1990	16	Buffalo Bills
Trent Dilfer	QB	1994	6	Tampa Bay Buccaneers
David Carr	QB	2002	1	Houston Texans
Logan Mankins	G	2005	32	New England Patriots
Ryan Mathews	RB	2010	12	San Diego Chargers

=== Active NFL ===
Updated October 2026.

- Davante Adams, Los Angeles Rams
- Levelle Bailey, Denver Broncos
- DaRon Bland, Dallas Cowboys
- Dean Clark, Philadelphia Eagles
- Jake Haener, New York Giants
- Al'zillion Hamilton, New England Patriots
- Jalen Moreno-Cropper, New Orleans Saints
- Arron Mosby, Green Bay Packers
- Nikko Remigio, Kansas City Chiefs
- Ronnie Rivers, Los Angeles Rams
- Jacob Spomer, Los Angeles Chargers
