= Bob Padilla =

American gridiron football coach (1936–2007)

Biographical details
- Born: February 11, 1936; Santa Ana, California, U.S.
- Died: October 15, 2007 (aged 71); Madera, California, U.S.
- Education: Fresno State

Coaching career (HC unless noted)
- 1958–1959: Lindsay HS (CA) (assistant)
- 1960: Sanger HS (CA) (assistant)
- 1961–1965: Parlier HS (CA)
- 1966–1967: Fresno Central HS (CA)
- 1968–1972: Fresno State (DC)
- 1973–1975: San Jose State (DC)
- 1976–1977: Michigan State (DC)
- 1978–1979: Fresno State
- 1980–1981: Washington State (DC)
- 1982–1983: Arizona State (DL)
- 1984–1985: Houston Oilers (DL)
- 1986: Wichita State (DL)
- 1987–1991: Winnipeg Blue Bombers (DL)

Head coaching record
- Overall: 7–15 (college)

Robert Padilla Jr. (February 11, 1936 – October 15, 2007) was an American gridiron football coach. He served as the head football coach at California State University, Fresno from 1978 to 1979, compiling a record of 7–15.

== Head coaching record ==
=== College ===
Year	Team	Overall	Conference	Standing	Bowl/playoffs
Fresno State Bulldogs (Pacific Coast Athletic Conference) (1978–1979)
1978	Fresno State	3–8	1–4	T–5th	
1979	Fresno State	4–7	2–3	4th	
Fresno State:		7–15	3–7		
Total:		7–15			
