= College Park, San Jose =

College Park
- Neighborhood of San Jose
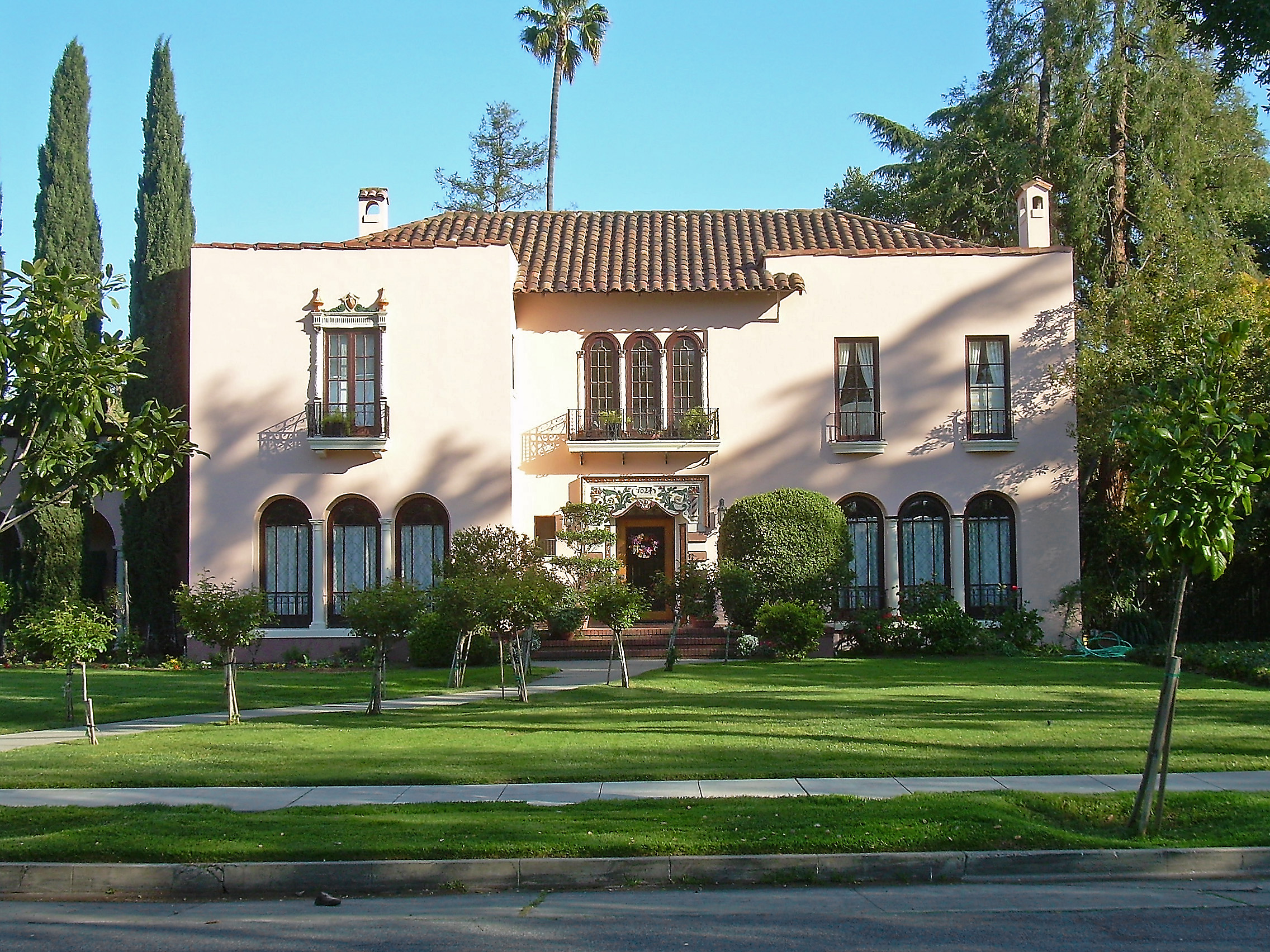
- The historic Wright House, built in 1922 by Frank Delos Wolfe.

- Location within San Jose
- Coordinates: 37.34096°N 121.92029°W
- Country: United States
- State: California
- County: Santa Clara
- City: San Jose

College Park is a historic neighborhood of Central San Jose, California, located within the greater district of The Alameda.

== History ==
The area has been called College Park since 1871, when the University of the Pacific built its campus in the area. The University existed in San Jose until 1923, when it moved to Stockton, California.

When University of the Pacific left College Park, Bellarmine College Preparatory took over its former campus.

== Transportation ==
Caltrain rail stations:

- College Park (Caltrain station)

== Notable people ==
- Sara J. Dorr (1855–1924), temperance activist
