= Duke Jacobs =

American football player and coach

Biographical details
- Born: c. 1921

Playing career
- 1941: Newark Bears
- Position: Quarterback

Coaching career (HC unless noted)
- 1943: McKinley Tech HS (DC)
- 1947: George Washington (backfield)
- 1948: Arkansas State (backfield)
- 1949: Oklahoma (assistant)
- 1950–1951: Fresno State
- 1953: Brown (assistant)

Head coaching record
- Overall: 7–11–1 (college)

Sylvan "Duke" Jacobs (c. 1921 – ?) was an American football player and coach. He served as the head football coach at Fresno State College—now known as California State University, Fresno—from 1950 to 1951, compiling a record of 7–11–1. A native of Red Lion, Pennsylvania, Jacobs graduated from the University of Maryland in 1942. He attended Duke University as was injured during a practiced as a freshman. After transferring to Maryland, Jacob practiced with the football team, but did not letter. He played professional football in 1941 with Newark Bears of the American Association. In the spring of 1942, the Cleveland Rams of the National Football League (NFL) signed Jacobs to a contract, paying $150 per game for an 11-game season.

== Head coaching record ==
=== College ===
Year	Team	Overall	Conference	Standing
Fresno State Bulldogs (California Collegiate Athletic Association) (1950)
1950	Fresno State	2–6–1	1–2–1	4th
Fresno State Bulldogs (Independent) (1951)
1951	Fresno State	5–5		
Fresno State:		7–11–1	1–2–1	
Total:		7–11–1		
