= Clark Van Galder =

American football and basketball player (1909–1965)

Biographical details
- Born: February 6, 1909; Janesville, Wisconsin, U.S.
- Died: November 16, 1965 (aged 56); Madison, Wisconsin, U.S.

Coaching career (HC unless noted)

Football
- 1932–1937: South Milwaukee HS (WI)
- 1938–1947: Washington Park HS (WI)
- 1948–1951: La Crosse State
- 1952–1958: Fresno State
- 1959–1965: Wisconsin (assistant)

Basketball
- 1948–1952: La Crosse State
- 1953–1954: Fresno State

Head coaching record
- Overall: 77–27–3 (college football)
- Bowls: 1–0

Accomplishments and honors

Championships
- Football; 3 Wisconsin State Teachers College Conference (1949–1951); 3 CCAA (1954–1955, 1958)

Clark Van Galder (February 6, 1909 – November 16, 1965) was an American football, basketball player, track athlete, and coach. He served as the head football coach at La Crosse State Teachers, now University of Wisconsin–La Crosse, from 1948 to 1951 and at Fresno State College, now California State University, Fresno, from 1952 to 1958, compiling a career college football record of 77–27–3. Van Galder died on November 16, 1965, after collapsing at a banquet in Madison, Wisconsin. He had five sons, the fourth of which, Tim, played football as a quarterback at Iowa State University and then in the National Football League (NFL) with the New York Jets and St. Louis Cardinals.

At the University of Wisconsin–La Crosse, Van Galder competed in football, basketball, and track and field.

== Head coaching record ==
=== College football ===
Year	Team	Overall	Conference	Standing	Bowl/playoffs
La Crosse State Indians (Wisconsin State Teachers College Conference) (1948–1951)
1948	La Crosse State	7–1–1	4–1–1	T–2nd	
1949	La Crosse State	7–2	5–1	T–1st	
1950	La Crosse State	10–0	6–0	T–1st	W Cigar
1951	La Crosse State	7–2	6–0	1st	
La Crosse State:		31–5–1	21–2–1		
Fresno State Bulldogs (Independent) (1952)
1952	Fresno State	8–2			
Fresno State Bulldogs (California Collegiate Athletic Association) (1953–1958)
1953	Fresno State	4–4–2	2–2–1	3rd	
1954	Fresno State	7–3	4–0	1st	
1955	Fresno State	9–1	2–0	1st	
1956	Fresno State	8–2	2–0	1st	
1957	Fresno State	5–5	1–1	T–3rd	
1958	Fresno State	5–5	4–1	T–1st	
Fresno State:		46–22–2	15–4–1		
Total:		77–27–3			
National championship Conference title Conference division title or championship game berth
