= Cecil Coleman =

American football player, coach, and college administrator (1924–1988)

Biographical details
- Born: April 12, 1924
- Died: February 27, 1988 (aged 63); Urbana, Illinois, U.S.

Playing career
- 1946–1949: Arizona State
- Position: Quarterback

Coaching career (HC unless noted)
- 1950–1955: North HS (AZ)
- 1956: Long Beach
- 1957–1958: Arizona State (assistant)
- 1959–1963: Fresno State

Administrative career (AD unless noted)
- 1963–1971: Fresno State
- 1971–1972: Wichita State
- 1972–1979: Illinois

Head coaching record
- Overall: 37–13 (college); 6–3 (junior college)
- Bowls: 1–0

Accomplishments and honors

Championships
- 2 CCAA (1959–1961)

Cecil Noble Coleman Jr. (April 12, 1924 – February 27, 1988) was an American football player, coach, and college athletics administrator. He served as the head football coach at Fresno State College—now known as California State University, Fresno—from 1959 to 1963, compiling a record of 37–13. Coleman was the athletic director at Fresno State from 1963 to 1971, at Wichita State University from 1971 to 1972, and at the University of Illinois at Urbana–Champaign from 1972 to 1979.

Coleman played college football at Arizona State University, from which he graduated in 1950. He was the starting quarterback for the Sun Devils and captain of the 1949 Arizona State Sun Devils football team. Coleman began his coaching career in 1950 at North High School in Phoenix, Arizona. He coached there for six seasons before moving on to Long Beach City College in 1956. Coleman returned to his alma mater, Arizona State, in 1957 and worked as an assistant under head coach Dan Devine for two seasons.

Coleman died at the age of 63, on February 27, 1988, at the Carle Clinic in Urbana, Illinois.

== Head coaching record ==
=== College ===
Year	Team	Overall	Conference	Standing	Bowl/playoffs	AP^{#}	UPI^{°}
Fresno State Bulldogs (California Collegiate Athletic Association) (1959–1963)
1959	Fresno State	7–3	5–0	1st			
1960	Fresno State	9–1	5–0	1st			9
1961	Fresno State	10–0	5–0	1st	W Mercy	3	5
1962	Fresno State	7–3	4–1	2nd		8	7
1963	Fresno State	4–6	2–2	T–3rd			
Fresno State:		37–13	21–3				
Total:		37–13					
National championship Conference title Conference division title or championship game berth

=== Junior college ===
Year	Team	Overall	Conference	Standing	Bowl/playoffs
Long Beach Vikings (Metropolitan Conference) (1956)
1956	Long Beach	6–3	4–3	T–4th	
Long Beach:		6–3	4–3		
Total:		6–3			
