= James Bradshaw (American football) =

American football player and coach

Playing career
- 1920–1921: Nevada
- Position: Halfback

Coaching career (HC unless noted)
- 1927: Galileo HS (CA)
- 1928–1935: Stanford (backfield)
- 1936–1942: Fresno State
- 1946: Fresno State

Head coaching record
- Overall: 59–18–5 (college)
- Bowls: 2–0

Accomplishments and honors

Championships
- 1 Far Western (1937); 1 CCAA (1941)

James W. "Rabbit" Bradshaw was an American football player and coach. He served as the head football coach at Fresno State College—now known as California State University, Fresno—from 1936 to 1942 and again in 1946, compiling a record of 59–18–5. Bradshaw played college football at the University of Nevada. He began his coaching career at Galileo High School—now known as Galileo Academy of Science and Technology—in San Francisco before moving to Stanford University in 1928 as backfield coach. Bradshaw was considered for the position of head football coach at the University of Oregon in January 1938.

Bradshaw was inducted into the Fresno County Athletic Hall of Fame in 1964.

== Head coaching record ==
=== College ===
Year	Team	Overall	Conference	Standing	Bowl/playoffs
Fresno State Bulldogs (Far Western Conference) (1936–1938)
1936	Fresno State	5–3–1	2–1	2nd	
1937	Fresno State	8–1–1	4–0	1st	W Charity
1938	Fresno State	7–3	2–1	2nd	
Fresno State Bulldogs (California Collegiate Athletic Association / Far Western Conference) (1939)
1939	Fresno State	10–1	1–1 / 2–0	2nd / 1st (Note: The 1939 Fresno State Bulldogs football team had the best record in the Far Western Conference (FWC), but was ineligible for the conference championship because they only played two league games.)	
Fresno State Bulldogs (California Collegiate Athletic Association) (1940–1941)
1940	Fresno State	9–2–1	1–1–1	T–2nd	W Pineapple
1941	Fresno State	4–3–2	2–0–1	T–1st	
Fresno State Bulldogs (Independent) (1942)
1942	Fresno State	9–1			
Fresno State Bulldogs (California Collegiate Athletic Association) (1946)
1946	Fresno State	8–4	2–2	T–2nd	
Fresno State:		59–18–5	16–6–2		
Total:		59–18–5			
National championship Conference title Conference division title or championship game berth
