= Northern California Junior College Conference =

Former American collegiate athletics conference

- Formerly: California Coast Conference (1922–1930)
- Founded: 1922
- Folded: 1950
- Region: West Coast

The Northern California Junior College Conference (NCJCC) was an intercollegiate athletic conference with member schools located mostly in California. The conference was founded in 1922 as the California Coast Conference (CCC) and initially had both junior college (two-year) and four-year college members. The California Coast Conference was formed at a meeting held in Fresno, California on May 12 and May 13, 1922. The conference's eight charter members were divided into two groups. The northern group consisted of Chico State College—now known as California State University, Chico, San Jose State Teachers College—now known as San Jose State University, Modesto Junior College, and the College of the Pacific—now known as the University of the Pacific. The southern group included Fresno State College—now known as California State University, Fresno, Loyola College of Los Angeles—now known as Loyola Marymount University, Santa Barbara State College—now known as University of California, Santa Barbara, and California Polytechnic Institute—now known as California Polytechnic State University, San Luis Obispo. Schedules were drawn up for competition in four sports: football, basketball, baseball, and track and field. Southern Oregon Normal School—now known as Southern Oregon University—joined the conference in 1929, but withdrew after the football season that fall.

In 1930, the conference was reorganized as the Northern California Junior College Conference. In 1950, the conference was split into three new conferences: the Big Seven Conference, the Coast Conference, and the Golden Valley Conference.

All of the two-year schools that were in the conference are now members of a conference within the California Community College Athletic Association (3C2A). Of the four-year schools, Fresno State, San Jose State, Chico State, and Pacific left the conference and joined the Far Western Conference—later known as the Northern California Athletic Conference. Cal Poly did not become a four-year school until 1941, and played as an independent after leaving the CCC. Loyola joined the West Coast Conference, while Santa Barbara State joined the California Collegiate Athletic Association.

== Members ==
Institution	Location	Founded	Nickname	Joined	Left	Current conference (association/level)
Bakersfield Junior College	Bakersfield, California	1913	Renegades	1923	1924	Western State Conference (3C2A)
California Polytechnic Institute	San Luis Obispo, California	1915	Mustangs	1922	1928	Big West Conference (NCAA Division I)
Chico State Teachers College	Chico, California	1900	Wildcats	1922	1928	California Collegiate Athletic Association (NCAA Division II)
San Mateo Junior College	San Mateo, California	1922	Bulldogs	1923	1928	Coast Conference (3C2A)
Fresno State College	Fresno, California	1911	Bulldogs	1922	1924	Mountain West Conference (NCAA Division I)
Loyola College of Los Angeles	Los Angeles, California	1911	Lions	1922	1922	West Coast Conference (NCAA Division I)
Marin Junior College	Kentfield, California	1926	Mariners	1927	1928	Big 8 Conference (3C2A)
Modesto Junior College	Modesto, California	1921	Pirates	1922	1928	Big 8 Conference (3C2A)
College of the Pacific	Stockton, California	1895	Tigers	1922	1928	West Coast Conference
Sacramento Junior College	Sacramento, California	1916	Panthers	1922	1928	Big 8 Conference (3C2A)
San Jose State Teachers College	San Jose, California	1857	Spartans	1922	1928	Mountain West Conference (NCAA Division I)
Santa Barbara State College	Santa Barbara, California	1891	Roadrunners	1927	1928	Big West Conference (NCAA Division I)
Santa Rosa Junior College	Santa Rosa, California	1918	Bear Cubs	1925	1928	Big 8 Conference (3C2A)

== Football champions ==
- 1922: Fresno State (2–0–1)
- 1923: Fresno State (3–0) and Pacific (CA) (4–0)
- 1924: Chico State (4–0)
- 1925: Chico State defeated San Mateo (championship game, forfeit)
- 1926: Chico State (5–0–1)
- 1927: Sacramento defeated Chico State (championship game)
- 1928: San Jose State tied San Mateo (championship game)

== Yearly football standings ==
1922 California Coast Conference football standings
	Conf.					Overall
Team	W		L		T	W		L		T
Fresno State $	2	–	0	–	1	7	–	1	–	2
Pacific (CA)	3	–	0	–	0	6	–	1	–	0
Chico State	2	–	1	–	0	5	–	3	–	0
Modesto	2	–	2	–	1	2	–	3	–	4
Loyola (CA)	1	–	1	–	0	3	–	4	–	1
Sacramento	0	–	1	–	0	?	–	?	–	?
Cal Poly	0	–	2	–	0	1	–	3	–	0
San Jose State	0	–	3	–	0	2	–	5	–	1
$ – Conference champion

1923 California Coast Conference football standings
	Conf.					Overall
Team	W		L		T	W		L		T
Pacific (CA) +	4	–	0	–	0	7	–	0	–	0
Fresno State +	3	–	0	–	0	7	–	2	–	0
Chico State	2	–	1	–	0	5	–	2	–	2
Cal Poly	2	–	1	–	0	3	–	3	–	0
Bakersfield	1	–	1	–	0	4	–	4	–	0
Modesto	1	–	1	–	0	3	–	5	–	0
San Mateo	1	–	3	–	0	?	–	?	–	?
Sacramento	0	–	3	–	0	?	–	?	–	?
San Jose State	0	–	4	–	0	0	–	6	–	0
+ – Conference co-champions

1924 California Coast Conference football standings
	Conf.					Overall
Team	W		L		T	W		L		T
Chico State $	2	–	0	–	0	7	–	2	–	0
Fresno State	3	–	0	–	0	7	–	2	–	0
Modesto	2	–	1	–	0	3	–	4	–	1
San Mateo	1	–	1	–	0	?	–	?	–	?
Bakersfield	1	–	2	–	0	2	–	3	–	2
San Jose State	0	–	1	–	0	1	–	4	–	0
Sacramento	0	–	1	–	0	?	–	?	–	?
Cal Poly	0	–	3	–	0	1	–	5	–	0
$ – Conference champion

1925 California Coast Conference football standings
	Conf.					Overall
Team	W		L		T	W		L		T
Chico State $	5	–	0	–	0	7	–	1	–	0
San Mateo			–					–
Modesto	3	–	3	–	0	3	–	6	–	1
Cal Poly	1	–	2	–	0	4	–	5	–	0
San Jose State	2	–	4	–	0	2	–	5	–	0
Bakersfield	0	–	1	–	0	0	–	1	–	0
Sacramento			–					–
Santa Rosa			–					–
$ – Conference champion; Includes forfeit by San Mateo to Chico State

1926 California Coast Conference football standings
	Conf.					Overall
Team	W		L		T	W		L		T
Chico State $	5	–	0	–	1	5	–	2	–	1
Sacramento	4	–	1	–	1	?	–	?	–	?
San Mateo	3	–	1	–	0	0	–	0	–	0
Modesto	2	–	3	–	1	2	–	3	–	1
Cal Poly	1	–	3	–	0	5	–	4	–	0
Santa Rosa	1	–	4	–	0	?	–	?	–	?
San Jose State	0	–	5	–	1	1	–	6	–	1
$ – Conference champion

1927 California Coast Conference football standings
	Conf.					Overall
Team	W		L		T	W		L		T
Sacramento $	6	–	0	–	0	?	–	?	–	?
Chico State	5	–	1	–	0	6	–	2	–	0
Modesto	4	–	2	–	0	5	–	3	–	0
Santa Barbara State	2	–	1	–	0	3	–	5	–	0
San Jose State	3	–	3	–	0	4	–	5	–	0
Cal Poly	1	–	4	–	0	2	–	4	–	1
Bakersfield			–			0	–	3	–	1
San Mateo			–					–
Santa Rosa			–					–
$ – Conference champion

1928 California Coast Conference football standings
	Conf.					Overall
Team	W		L		T	W		L		T
San Mateo +	7	–	0	–	0	?	–	?	–	?
San Jose State +	6	–	2	–	0	6	–	2	–	1
Modesto	5	–	2	–	1	5	–	3	–	1
Sacramento	3	–	2	–	0	?	–	?	–	?
Cal Poly	1	–	2	–	1	3	–	4	–	2
Santa Barbara State	1	–	2	–	0	4	–	5	–	0
Chico State	1	–	4	–	0	2	–	6	–	0
Santa Rosa	2	–	5	–	0	?	–	?	–	?
Marin	0	–	4	–	0	?	–	?	–	?
Championship: San Jose State 21, San Mateo 21
+ – Conference co-champions

1929 California Coast Conference football standings
	Conf.					Overall
Team	W		L		T	W		L		T
Sacramento $	4	–	0	–	0	?	–	?	–	?
San Mateo	4	–	1	–	0	?	–	?	–	?
Menlo	4	–	1	–	0	?	–	?	–	?
Marin	3	–	2	–	0	?	–	?	–	?
Modesto	2	–	4	–	0	?	–	?	–	?
Cal Poly	0	–	2	–	0	3	–	5	–	0
Santa Rosa	0	–	3	–	0	?	–	?	–	?
Southern Oregon Normal	0	–	4	–	0	2	–	4	–	1
$ – Conference champion

1931 Northern California Junior College Conference football standings
	Conf.					Overall
Team	W		L		T	W		L		T
Sacramento $	4	–	0	–	0	?	–	?	–	?
San Mateo	5	–	1	–	0	?	–	?	–	?
Cal Poly	3	–	2	–	0	3	–	5	–	1
Menlo	2	–	2	–	1	?	–	?	–	?
Santa Rosa	1	–	3	–	0	?	–	?	–	?
Marin	1	–	4	–	0	?	–	?	–	?
Modesto	0	–	4	–	1	?	–	?	–	?
$ – Conference champion

1932 Northern California Junior College Conference football standings
	Conf.					Overall
Team	W		L		T	W		L		T
San Mateo +	4	–	0	–	1	?	–	?	–	?
Sacramento +	3	–	0	–	1	?	–	?	–	?
Modesto	3	–	2	–	0	?	–	?	–	?
Menlo	2	–	2	–	0	?	–	?	–	?
Marin	1	–	4	–	0	?	–	?	–	?
Santa Rosa	1	–	5	–	0	?	–	?	–	?
Yuba	0	–	1	–	0	?	–	?	–	?
+ – Conference co-champions

1933 Northern California Junior College Conference football standings
	Conf.					Overall
Team	W		L		T	W		L		T
San Mateo $	5	–	0	–	0	?	–	?	–	?
Modesto	3	–	1	–	0	?	–	?	–	?
Sacramento	2	–	2	–	0	?	–	?	–	?
Menlo	1	–	2	–	0	?	–	?	–	?
Marin	1	–	3	–	0	?	–	?	–	?
Santa Rosa	0	–	4	–	0	?	–	?	–	?
$ – Conference champion

1934 Northern California Junior College Conference football standings
	Conf.					Overall
Team	W		L		T	W		L		T
Modesto $	4	–	0	–	0	?	–	?	–	?
Menlo	3	–	1	–	0	?	–	?	–	?
Sacramento	1	–	2	–	1	?	–	?	–	?
San Mateo	1	–	3	–	0	?	–	?	–	?
Marin	0	–	3	–	1	?	–	?	–	?
$ – Conference champion

1946 Northern California Junior College Conference football standings
	Conf.					Overall
Team	W		L		T	W		L		T
San Francisco JC $	7	–	0	–	0	8	–	1	–	0
San Mateo	3	–	3	–	1	?	–	?	–	?
Sacramento	3	–	4	–	0	?	–	?	–	?
Modesto	2	–	4	–	1	?	–	?	–	?
Salinas	0	–	4	–	0	?	–	?	–	?
$ – Conference champion

1948 Northern California Junior College Conference football standings
	Conf.					Overall
Team	W		L		T	W		L		T
A Division
CC of San Francisco xy$	8	–	0	–	0	12	–	0	–	0
Hartnell	7	–	1	–	0	8	–	2	–	0
Stockton	4	–	3	–	0	5	–	4	–	0
Sacramento City	4	–	3	–	0	4	–	5	–	0
Modesto	2	–	5	–	0	5	–	6	–	0
San Mateo	2	–	5	–	0	3	–	5	–	0
B Division
Menlo xy	5	–	1	–	0	6	–	3	–	0
Santa Rosa	4	–	3	–	0	6	–	4	–	0
Marin	4	–	4	–	0	5	–	4	–	1
Napa	3	–	3	–	0	6	–	4	–	1
Vallejo	4	–	4	–	0	6	–	4	–	1
Grant Tech	2	–	5	–	0	3	–	7	–	0
Monterey	0	–	4	–	1	?	–	?	–	?
Yuba	0	–	6	–	1	?	–	?	–	?
NCJCC championship: CC of San Francisco 24, Menlo 9
$ – Conference champion; x – Division champion/co-champions; y – Championship game participant

1949 Northern California Junior College Conference football standings
	Conf.					Overall
Team	W		L		T	W		L		T
Northern Division
Santa Rosa xy	6	–	0	–	0	9	–	1	–	1
Marin	4	–	2	–	0	5	–	3	–	1
Napa	4	–	2	–	0	6	–	2	–	0
Sacramento City	4	–	2	–	0	6	–	2	–	0
Vallejo	2	–	4	–	0	4	–	6	–	0
Grant Tech	1	–	5	–	0	2	–	7	–	0
Placer	0	–	6	–	0	0	–	6	–	0
Southern Division
Menlo xy$	5	–	1	–	0	7	–	2	–	0
San Mateo	4	–	2	–	0	5	–	3	–	1
CC of San Francisco	3	–	2	–	1	4	–	4	–	1
Stockton	3	–	3	–	0	4	–	6	–	0
Modesto	3	–	3	–	0	4	–	5	–	0
Monterey	2	–	3	–	1	4	–	4	–	1
Hartnell	0	–	6	–	0	1	–	8	–	0
NCJCC championship: Menlo 27, Santa Rosa 19
$ – Conference champion; x – Division champion/co-champions; y – Championship game participant

1950 Northern California Junior College Conference football standings
	Conf.					Overall
Team	W		L		T	W		L		T
Northern Division
Santa Rosa xy$	7	–	0	–	0	12	–	0	–	0
Sacramento City	6	–	1	–	0	7	–	2	–	0
Napa	5	–	2	–	0	7	–	3	–	0
Yuba	4	–	3	–	0	6	–	3	–	0
Marin	3	–	4	–	0	4	–	5	–	0
Grant Tech	2	–	5	–	0	3	–	6	–	0
Placer	1	–	6	–	0	2	–	7	–	0
Vallejo	0	–	7	–	0	0	–	11	–	0
Southern Division
Monterey xy	5	–	1	–	0	9	–	2	–	0
Stockton	4	–	2	–	0	8	–	2	–	0
Modesto	4	–	2	–	0	6	–	4	–	1
Hartnell	3	–	3	–	0	4	–	4	–	0
San Mateo	2	–	3	–	0	3	–	5	–	0
CC of San Francisco	1	–	4	–	0	2	–	6	–	0
Menlo	1	–	5	–	0	3	–	5	–	1
NCJCC championship: Santa Rosa 14, Monterey 0
$ – Conference champion; x – Division champion/co-champions; y – Championship game participant

== See also ==
- List of defunct college football conferences
