= Tony Steponovich =

American football player (1907–2000)

No. 6
- Positions: Guard, end, fullback

Personal information
- Born: January 15, 1907; Globe, Arizona, U.S.
- Died: January 5, 2000 (aged 92); Riverside, California, U.S.
- Listed height: 5 ft 11 in (1.80 m)
- Listed weight: 185 lb (84 kg)

Career information
- High school: Inglewood (Inglewood, California)
- College: USC

Career history

Playing
- Minneapolis Red Jackets (1930); Frankford Yellow Jackets (1930); Los Angeles Maroons (1935); Hollywood Stars (1936)

Coaching
- Football: Oceanside HS (CA) (1931–1934) Head coach; Riverside (1946–1947) Assistant coach; Riverside (1948–1949) Head coach; Baseball: Riverside (1947–1948) Head coach
- Stats at Pro Football Reference

Anthony John Steponovich (January 15, 1907 – January 5, 2000) was an American football player and coach. He played professionally as a guard, and end for the Minneapolis Red Jackets and Frankford Yellow Jackets of the National Football League (NFL) in 1930. Steponovich served as the head football coach at Riverside Junior College from 1948 to 1949.

== Early life ==
Steponovich was born in 1907 in Globe, Arizona, an attended Inglewood High School in Inglewood, California. He enrolled at the University of Southern California (USC), where he played college football for the freshman team in 1926 and for the varsity from 1927 to 1929. As a senior, he played for 1929 USC team that won the Pacific Coast Conference championship, defeated Pittsburgh in the 1930 Rose Bowl and has been retroactively recognized by some selectors as the national champion.

== Professional football ==
Prior to the 1930 season, Steponovich and two of his USC teammates, Nate Barragar and John Ward, signed with the Minneapolis Red Jackets of the National Football League (NFL). He appeared in nine games for the Red Jackets, six as a starter. He played at the end, guard, and center positions.

Steponovich and his USC teammates Barragar and Ward finished the 1930 season with the NFL's Philadelphia franchise, known as the Frankford Yellow Jackets. Steponovich started three games at the end position for the Yellow Jackets. In all, Steponovich appeared in 12 NFL games, 9 as a starter.

Steponovich returned to professional football in 1935 as a guard for the Los Angeles Maroons, and in 1936 as a fullback for the Hollywood Stars.

Steponovich's younger brother, Mike Steponovich, also played in the NFL.

== Coaching career and later years ==
Steponovich later coached football at Oceanside High School in Oceanside, California, and at Riverside Polytechnic High School and Riverside Junior College in Riverside, California. He was promoted to head football coach at Riverside Junior College in 1948, succeeding Jess Mortensen. His Riverside Junior College teams won only one conference game in two years, and he was replaced as head coach in March 1950.

Steponovich died in 2000, in Riverside.

== Head coaching record ==
=== Junior college ===
Year	Team	Overall	Conference	Standing	Bowl/playoffs
Riverside Tigers (Eastern Conference) (1948–1949)
1948	Riverside		1–5	6th	
1949	Riverside		0–5–1	7th	
Riverside:			1–10–1		
Total:					
