= 1929 Oregon Webfoots football team =

American college football season

1929 Oregon Webfoots football

PCC co-champion
- Conference: Pacific Coast Conference
- Record: 7–3 (4–1 PCC)
- Head coach: John McEwan (4th season)
- Captain: David Mason
- Home stadium: Hayward Field

1929 Pacific Coast Conference football standings
	Conf.					Overall
Team	W		L		T	W		L		T
No. 6 USC ^ +	6	–	1	–	0	10	–	2	–	0
Stanford +	5	–	1	–	0	9	–	2	–	0
No. 4 California +	4	–	1	–	0	7	–	1	–	1
Oregon +	4	–	1	–	0	7	–	3	–	0
Washington State	4	–	2	–	0	10	–	2	–	0
UCLA	1	–	3	–	0	4	–	4	–	0
Oregon State	1	–	4	–	0	5	–	4	–	0
Idaho	1	–	4	–	0	4	–	5	–	0
Montana	0	–	4	–	1	3	–	5	–	1
Washington	0	–	5	–	1	2	–	6	–	1
+ – Conference co-champions; ^ – Selected as Rose Bowl representative; Rankings from Dickinson System

The 1929 Oregon Webfoots football team represented the University of Oregon in the 1929 college football season. It was the Webfoots' 36th overall and 14th season as a member of the Pacific Coast Conference (PCC). The team was led by head coach John McEwan, in his fourth year, and played their home games at Hayward Field in Eugene and at Multnomah Field in Portland, Oregon. They finished the season with a record of seven wins, three losses (7–3 overall, 4–1 in the PCC) and in a four-way tie for the PCC championship.

== Schedule ==
Date	Opponent	Site	Result	Attendance	Source
September 28	Pacific (OR)*	Hayward Field; Eugene, OR	W 58–0		
October 5	at Stanford	Stanford Stadium; Stanford, CA	L 7–33		
October 12	Willamette*	Hayward Field; Eugene, OR	W 34–0		
October 19	Idaho	Multnomah Field; Portland, OR	W 34–7	20,000	
October 26	at Washington	Husky Stadium; Seattle WA (rivalry)	W 14–0	13,172–16,000	
November 2	UCLA	Hayward Field; Eugene, OR	W 27–0		
November 16	Oregon State	Hayward Field; Eugene, OR (rivalry)	W 16–0		
November 23	Hawaii*	Multnomah Field; Portland, OR	W 7–0		
November 28	at Saint Mary's*	Kezar Stadium; San Francisco, CA (rivalry)	L 6–31	30,000	
December 7	vs. Florida*	Madison Square Garden; Miami, FL	L 6–20	25,000	
*Non-conference game; Source:
