= 1929 Oregon State Beavers football team =

American college football season

1929 Oregon State Beavers football
- Conference: Pacific Coast Conference
- Record: 5–4 (1–4 PCC)
- Head coach: Paul J. Schissler (6th season)
- Captain: None
- Home stadium: Bell Field

1929 Pacific Coast Conference football standings
	Conf.					Overall
Team	W		L		T	W		L		T
No. 6 USC ^ +	6	–	1	–	0	10	–	2	–	0
Stanford +	5	–	1	–	0	9	–	2	–	0
No. 4 California +	4	–	1	–	0	7	–	1	–	1
Oregon +	4	–	1	–	0	7	–	3	–	0
Washington State	4	–	2	–	0	10	–	2	–	0
UCLA	1	–	3	–	0	4	–	4	–	0
Oregon State	1	–	4	–	0	5	–	4	–	0
Idaho	1	–	4	–	0	4	–	5	–	0
Montana	0	–	4	–	1	3	–	5	–	1
Washington	0	–	5	–	1	2	–	6	–	1
+ – Conference co-champions; ^ – Selected as Rose Bowl representative; Rankings from Dickinson System

The 1929 Oregon State Beavers football team represented Oregon State University in the Pacific Coast Conference (PCC) during the 1929 college football season. In their sixth season under head coach Paul J. Schissler, the Beavers compiled a 5–4 record (1–4 against PCC opponents), finished in a tie for seventh place in the PCC, and outscored their opponents, 182 to 106. Under coach Schissler, from 1925 to 1932, no team captains were elected. The team played its home games at Bell Field in Corvallis, Oregon.

== Background ==
Feeling ran high ahead of the November 16 game in Eugene against the University of Oregon Webfoots, when about a week before the contest Oregon State fans planted dynamite under the college "O" atop Skinner's Butte. The loud blast destroyed a large chunk of the sign, and was interpreted as payback for the destruction of the "Lady of the Fountain" sculpture on the Oregon State campus the year before. Not to be outdone in commission of sport-related vandalism, Oregon students responded with green and yellow paint reading "To Hell With OSC" on the school's Memorial Union and forestry buildings.

== Schedule ==
Date	Opponent	Site	Result	Attendance	Source
September 21	Willamette*	Bell Field; Corvallis, OR	W 37–6		
September 28	Cal Aggies*	Bell Field; Corvallis, OR	W 19–0		
October 5	at USC	Los Angeles Memorial Coliseum; Los Angeles, CA	L 7–21	40,000	
October 12	Columbia (OR)*	Bell Field; Corvallis, OR	W 71–7		
October 19	at Stanford	Stanford Stadium; Stanford, CA	L 7–40		
October 26	Idaho	Bell Field; Corvallis, OR	W 27–0		
November 2	Washington State	Multnomah Stadium; Portland, OR	L 0–9	16,000	
November 16	at Oregon	Hayward Field; Eugene, OR (rivalry)	L 0–16		
November 23	at Detroit*	University of Detroit Stadium; Detroit, MI	W 14–7		
*Non-conference game
