= 1929 Washington State Cougars football team =

American college football season

1929 Washington State Cougars football
- Conference: Pacific Coast Conference
- Record: 10–2 (4–2 PCC)
- Head coach: Babe Hollingbery (4th season)
- Captain: Ernest "Bud" Hansen
- Home stadium: Rogers Field

1929 Pacific Coast Conference football standings
	Conf.					Overall
Team	W		L		T	W		L		T
No. 6 USC ^ +	6	–	1	–	0	10	–	2	–	0
Stanford +	5	–	1	–	0	9	–	2	–	0
No. 4 California +	4	–	1	–	0	7	–	1	–	1
Oregon +	4	–	1	–	0	7	–	3	–	0
Washington State	4	–	2	–	0	10	–	2	–	0
UCLA	1	–	3	–	0	4	–	4	–	0
Oregon State	1	–	4	–	0	5	–	4	–	0
Idaho	1	–	4	–	0	4	–	5	–	0
Montana	0	–	4	–	1	3	–	5	–	1
Washington	0	–	5	–	1	2	–	6	–	1
+ – Conference co-champions; ^ – Selected as Rose Bowl representative; Rankings from Dickinson System

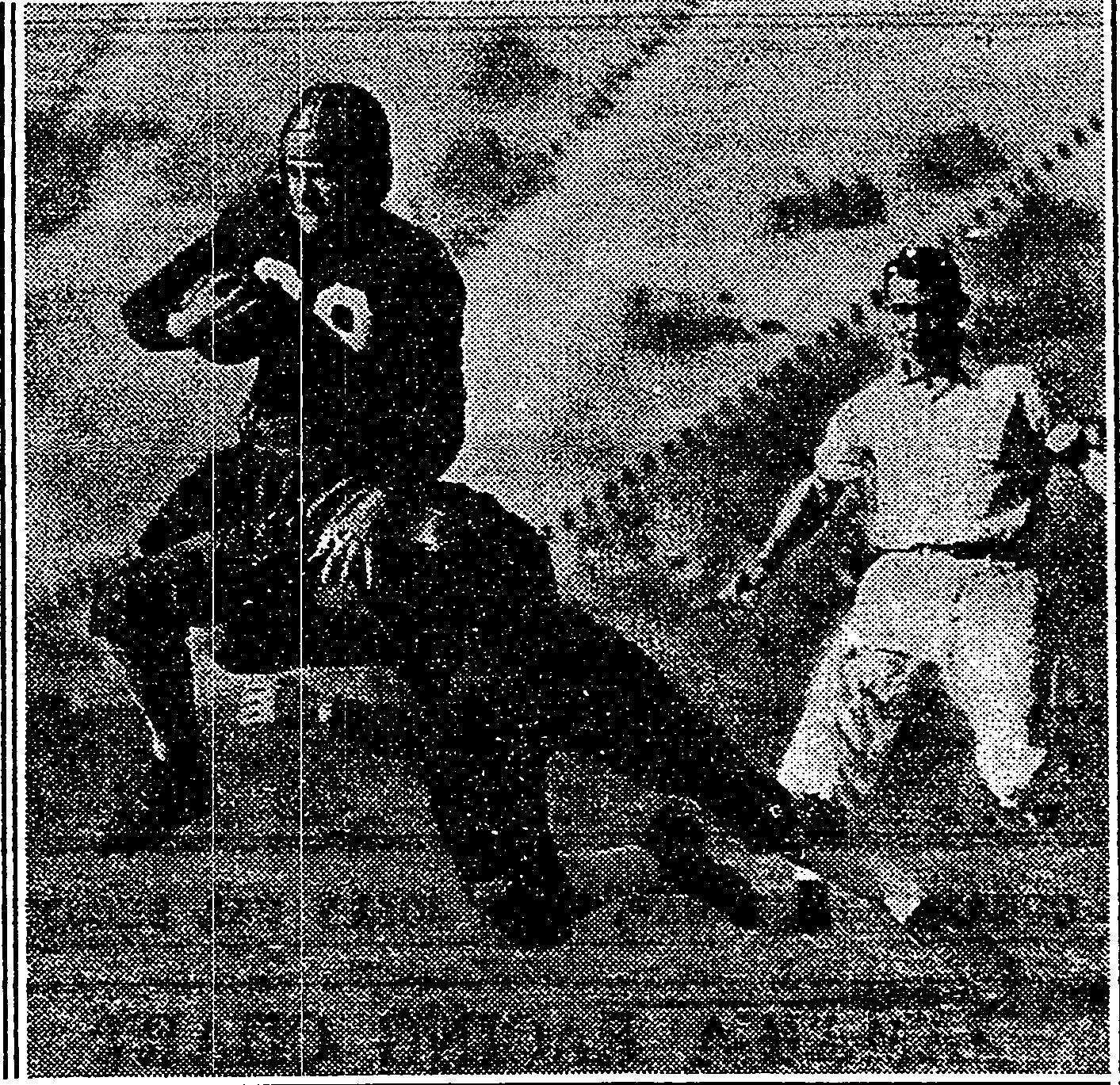
Roy Riegels of California tackling Archie Buckley of Washington State, Oct. 12, 1929

The 1929 Washington State Cougars football team was an American football team that represented Washington State College during the 1929 college football season. Head coach Babe Hollingbery led the team to a 4–2 mark in the PCC and 10–2 overall.

== Schedule ==
Date	Opponent	Site	Result	Attendance	Source
September 28	College of Idaho*	Rogers Field; Pullman, WA	W 48–0	4,000	
October 5	Mount St. Charles*	Rogers Field; Pullman, WA	W 38–0	5,000	
October 12	at California	California Memorial Stadium; Berkeley, CA	L 0–14	40,000	
October 19	Washington	Rogers Field; Pullman, WA (rivalry)	W 20–13	15,000	
October 26	Whitman*	Rogers Field; Pullman, WA	W 58–6	6,000	
November 2	at Oregon State	Multnomah Stadium; Portland, OR	W 9–0	16,000	
November 9	Idaho	Rogers Field; Pullman, WA (rivalry)	W 41–7	10,000	
November 16	at Montana	Dornblaser Field; Missoula, NT	W 13–0	3,000	
November 23	at Gonzaga*	Gonzaga Stadium; Spokane, WA	W 27–0	8,000	
November 30	at USC	Los Angeles Memorial Coliseum; Los Angeles, CA	L 7–27	35,000	
December 25	at Honolulu Townies*	Honolulu Stadium; Honolulu, Territory of Hawaii	W 12–0	10,000	
January 1, 1930	at Hawaii*	Honolulu Stadium; Honolulu, Territory of Hawaii	W 28–7	12,000	
*Non-conference game; Source:
