= 1949 Oregon Ducks football team =

American college football season

1949 Oregon Ducks football
- Conference: Pacific Coast Conference
- Record: 4–6 (2–5 PCC)
- Head coach: Jim Aiken (3rd season)
- Captain: None
- Home stadium: Hayward Field

1949 Pacific Coast Conference football standings
	Conf.					Overall
Team	W		L		T	W		L		T
No. 3 California $	7	–	0	–	0	10	–	1	–	0
UCLA	5	–	2	–	0	6	–	3	–	0
Stanford	4	–	2	–	0	7	–	3	–	1
USC	4	–	2	–	0	5	–	3	–	1
Oregon State	5	–	3	–	0	7	–	3	–	0
Oregon	2	–	5	–	0	4	–	6	–	0
Washington	2	–	5	–	0	3	–	7	–	0
Washington State	2	–	6	–	0	3	–	6	–	0
Idaho	1	–	4	–	0	3	–	5	–	0
Montana	0	–	3	–	0	5	–	4	–	0
$ – Conference champion; Rankings from AP Poll

The 1949 Oregon Ducks football team represented the University of Oregon in the Pacific Coast Conference (PCC) during the 1949 college football season. In their third season under head coach Jim Aiken, the Ducks compiled a 4–6 record (2–5 in PCC, sixth) and outscored their opponents 250 to 219. Home games were played on campus at Hayward Field in Eugene, Oregon.

== Schedule ==
Date	Opponent	Site	Result	Attendance	Source
September 16	at Saint Mary's*	Kezar Stadium; San Francisco, CA (Governors' Trophy Game)	W 24–7	40,000	
September 24	Idaho	Hayward Field; Eugene, OR	W 41–0	18,300	
September 30	at UCLA	Los Angeles Memorial Coliseum; Los Angeles, CA	L 27–35	43,137	
October 8	at Washington State	Rogers Field; Pullman, WA	W 21–0	16,000	
October 15	Colorado*	Hayward Field; Eugene, OR	W 42–14	12,500	
October 22	at No. 19 USC	Los Angeles Memorial Coliseum; Los Angeles, CA	L 13–40	47,098	
October 29	at Iowa*	Iowa Stadium; Iowa City, IA	L 31–34	37,976	
November 5	Washington	Multnomah Stadium; Portland, OR (rivalry)	L 27–28	32,600	
November 12	at No. 4 California	California Memorial Stadium; Berkeley, CA	L 14–41	78,000	
November 19	Oregon State	Hayward Field; Eugene, OR (rivalry)	L 10–20	23,000	
*Non-conference game; Rankings from AP Poll released prior to the game; Source:
