= 1929 UCLA Bruins football team =

American college football season

1929 UCLA Bruins football
- Conference: Pacific Coast Conference
- Record: 4–4 (1–3 PCC)
- Head coach: William H. Spaulding (5th season)
- Home stadium: Los Angeles Memorial Coliseum

1929 Pacific Coast Conference football standings
	Conf.					Overall
Team	W		L		T	W		L		T
No. 6 USC ^ +	6	–	1	–	0	10	–	2	–	0
Stanford +	5	–	1	–	0	9	–	2	–	0
No. 4 California +	4	–	1	–	0	7	–	1	–	1
Oregon +	4	–	1	–	0	7	–	3	–	0
Washington State	4	–	2	–	0	10	–	2	–	0
UCLA	1	–	3	–	0	4	–	4	–	0
Oregon State	1	–	4	–	0	5	–	4	–	0
Idaho	1	–	4	–	0	4	–	5	–	0
Montana	0	–	4	–	1	3	–	5	–	1
Washington	0	–	5	–	1	2	–	6	–	1
+ – Conference co-champions; ^ – Selected as Rose Bowl representative; Rankings from Dickinson System

The 1929 UCLA Bruins football team was an American football team that represented the University of California, Los Angeles (UCLA) as a member of the Pacific Coast Conference (PCC) during the 1929 college football season. In their fifth year under head coach William H. Spaulding, the Bruins compiled a 4–4 record (1–3 against PCC opponents), finished in sixth place in the PCC, and were outscored by a total of 190 to 121.

The season opened with the first game played between UCLA and USC, ending in a 76–0 victory for USC. UCLA's lone conference win was against Montana, 14–0, in the last game of the season.

== Schedule ==
Date	Opponent	Site	Result	Attendance	Source
September 28	at USC	Los Angeles Memorial Coliseum; Los Angeles, CA (Victory Bell)	L 0–76	35,000–50,000	
October 5	Fresno State*	Westwood Field; Westwood, CA	W 56–6		
October 12	Stanford	Los Angeles Memorial Coliseum; Los Angeles, CA	L 0–57	20,000	
October 18	at Caltech*	Rose Bowl; Pasadena, CA	W 31–0	15,000	
October 26	Pomona*	Los Angeles Memorial Coliseum; Los Angeles, CA	W 20–0		
November 2	at Oregon	Hayward Field; Eugene, OR	L 0–27		
November 16	Saint Mary's*	Los Angeles Memorial Coliseum; Los Angeles, CA	L 0–24	25,000	
November 28	Montana	Los Angeles Memorial Coliseum; Los Angeles, CA	W 14-0	10,000	
*Non-conference game; Source:

== Roster ==
The following is a partial list of student-athletes on UCLA's football roster during the 1929 season.

- Harold Bishop
- Ansel Breiniman
- Carl Brown
- Jack Bryan
- Ted Dennis
- Ted Duffy
- John Duncan
- Norm Duncan
- George Forster
- Marion French
- Alfred Gibson
- Maurice Goodstein
- Aubrey Grossman
- Russell Huse
- Don Jacobson
- Glenwood Lloyd
- Lloyd McMillan
- Edward Milum
- Richard Mulhaupt
- Glenn Nelson
- Harvey Nelson
- Eugene Noble
- Beverly Ogden
- Bob Rasmus
- Robert Reinhard
- John Remsberg
- Howard Roberts
- Jerry Russom
- Clifton Simpson
- Arthur Smith
- Chester Smith
- Edward Solomon
- Howard Stoeffen
- Rueben Thoe
- Leonard Wellendorf
- Meyer Zimmerman
