= 1929 Idaho Vandals football team =

American college football season

1929 Idaho Vandals football
- Conference: Pacific Coast Conference
- Record: 4–5 (1–4 PCC)
- Head coach: Leo Calland (1st season)
- Home stadium: MacLean Field

1929 Pacific Coast Conference football standings
	Conf.					Overall
Team	W		L		T	W		L		T
No. 6 USC ^ +	6	–	1	–	0	10	–	2	–	0
Stanford +	5	–	1	–	0	9	–	2	–	0
No. 4 California +	4	–	1	–	0	7	–	1	–	1
Oregon +	4	–	1	–	0	7	–	3	–	0
Washington State	4	–	2	–	0	10	–	2	–	0
UCLA	1	–	3	–	0	4	–	4	–	0
Oregon State	1	–	4	–	0	5	–	4	–	0
Idaho	1	–	4	–	0	4	–	5	–	0
Montana	0	–	4	–	1	3	–	5	–	1
Washington	0	–	5	–	1	2	–	6	–	1
+ – Conference co-champions; ^ – Selected as Rose Bowl representative; Rankings from Dickinson System

The 1929 Idaho Vandals football team represented the University of Idaho in the 1929 college football season. The Vandals were led by first-year head coach Leo Calland and were in their eighth season in the Pacific Coast Conference. Home games were played on campus in Moscow at MacLean Field. Idaho compiled a 4–5 overall record and went 1–4 in conference games.

Calland was previously a USC assistant coach and a former player for the Trojans, a guard and captain as a senior on the 1922 team that won the Rose Bowl. Raised in Seattle, he was also the head coach of the USC basketball team for two seasons.

In the Battle of the Palouse with neighbor Washington State, the Cougars won for the second straight year, their first at home in Pullman in eight years.

The Vandals finished the season with a two-game road trip to Los Angeles and Pocatello in southeastern Idaho. Calland's return to USC was harsh, with a 72-point shutout by the Trojans to extend the season's losing streak to five games. The final game on Thanksgiving was a 41–7 win over the Tigers of the university's Southern Branch, today's Idaho State University, but then a two-year school.

== Schedule ==
Date	Opponent	Site	Result	Attendance	Source
September 28	Montana State*	MacLean Field; Moscow, ID	W 39–6		
October 5	Whitman*	MacLean Field; Moscow, ID	W 41–7		
October 12	Montana	MacLean Field; Moscow, ID (rivalry)	W 19–0		
October 19	at Oregon	Multnomah Stadium; Portland, OR	L 7–34	20,000	
October 26	at Oregon State	Bell Field; Corvallis, OR	L 0–27		
November 9	at Washington State	Rogers Field; Pullman, WA (Battle of the Palouse)	L 7–41	10,000	
November 16	Gonzaga*^{†}	MacLean Field; Moscow, ID	L 14–20	8,000	
November 23	at USC	Los Angeles Memorial Coliseum; Los Angeles, CA	L 0–72	10,000	
November 28	at Idaho Southern Branch*	Pocatello, ID (future rivalry)	W 41–7		
*Non-conference game; ^{†}Homecoming

== All-conference ==
No Vandals were named to the All-Coast team. on the All-Northwest team, tackle Gordon Diehl and center Lester Kirkpatrick were first team selections.
