= 1929 Washington Huskies football team =

American college football season

1929 Washington Huskies football
- Conference: Pacific Coast Conference
- Record: 2–6–1 (0–5–1 PCC)
- Head coach: Enoch Bagshaw (9th season)
- Captain: Paul Jessup
- Home stadium: University of Washington Stadium

1929 Pacific Coast Conference football standings
	Conf.					Overall
Team	W		L		T	W		L		T
No. 6 USC ^ +	6	–	1	–	0	10	–	2	–	0
Stanford +	5	–	1	–	0	9	–	2	–	0
No. 4 California +	4	–	1	–	0	7	–	1	–	1
Oregon +	4	–	1	–	0	7	–	3	–	0
Washington State	4	–	2	–	0	10	–	2	–	0
UCLA	1	–	3	–	0	4	–	4	–	0
Oregon State	1	–	4	–	0	5	–	4	–	0
Idaho	1	–	4	–	0	4	–	5	–	0
Montana	0	–	4	–	1	3	–	5	–	1
Washington	0	–	5	–	1	2	–	6	–	1
+ – Conference co-champions; ^ – Selected as Rose Bowl representative; Rankings from Dickinson System

The 1929 Washington Huskies football team was an American football team that represented the University of Washington during the 1929 college football season. In its ninth season under head coach Enoch Bagshaw, the team compiled a 2–6–1 record, finished in last place in the Pacific Coast Conference, but still outscored all opponents by a combined total of 145 to 127. Paul Jessup was the team captain.

== Schedule ==
Date	Opponent	Site	Result	Attendance	Source
September 28	Whitman*	University of Washington Stadium; Seattle, WA	W 47–0	10,110	
October 5	Montana	University of Washington Stadium; Seattle, WA	T 6–6	20,000	
October 12	USC	University of Washington Stadium; Seattle, WA	L 0–48	23,582	
October 19	at Washington State	Rogers Field; Pullman, WA (rivalry)	L 13–20	15,000	
October 26	Oregon	University of Washington Stadium; Seattle, WA (rivalry)	L 0–14	13,172–16,000	
November 1	at Puget Sound*	Tacoma Stadium; Tacoma, WA	W 73–0	20,000	
November 9	Stanford	University of Washington Stadium; Seattle, WA	L 0–6	15,474	
November 16	at California	California Memorial Stadium; Berkeley, CA	L 0–7	50,000	
November 23	at Chicago*	Stagg Field; Chicago, IL	L 6–26	20,000	
*Non-conference game; Source:
