= 1929 Montana Grizzlies football team =

American college football season

1929 Montana Grizzlies football
- Conference: Pacific Coast Conference
- Record: 3–5–1 (0–4–1 PCC)
- Head coach: Frank W. Milburn (4th season)
- Home stadium: Dornblaser Field

1929 Pacific Coast Conference football standings
	Conf.					Overall
Team	W		L		T	W		L		T
No. 6 USC ^ +	6	–	1	–	0	10	–	2	–	0
Stanford +	5	–	1	–	0	9	–	2	–	0
No. 4 California +	4	–	1	–	0	7	–	1	–	1
Oregon +	4	–	1	–	0	7	–	3	–	0
Washington State	4	–	2	–	0	10	–	2	–	0
UCLA	1	–	3	–	0	4	–	4	–	0
Oregon State	1	–	4	–	0	5	–	4	–	0
Idaho	1	–	4	–	0	4	–	5	–	0
Montana	0	–	4	–	1	3	–	5	–	1
Washington	0	–	5	–	1	2	–	6	–	1
+ – Conference co-champions; ^ – Selected as Rose Bowl representative; Rankings from Dickinson System

The 1929 Montana Grizzlies football team represented the University of Montana in the 1929 college football season as a member of the Pacific Coast Conference (PCC). The Grizzlies were led by fourth-year head coach Frank W. Milburn, played their home games at Dornblaser Field and finished the season with a record of three wins, five losses and one tie (3–5–1, 0–4–1 PCC).

== Schedule ==
Date	Opponent	Site	Result	Attendance	Source
September 21	Anaconda Anodes*	Dornblaser Field; Missoula, MT	W 18–2		
September 28	Mount St. Charles*	Dornblaser Field; Missoula, MT	W 19–0		
October 5	at Washington	Husky Stadium; Seattle, WA	T 6–6	20,000	
October 12	at Idaho	MacLean Field; Moscow, ID (rivalry)	L 0–19		
October 19	Intermountain Union*	Dornblaser Field; Missoula, MT	W 45–0		
October 26	vs. Montana State*	Clark Park; Butte, MT (rivalry)	L 12–14	7,000	
November 9	at California	California Memorial Stadium; Berkeley, CA	L 18–53	25,000	
November 16	Washington State	Dornblaser Field; Missoula, MT	L 0–13	3,000	
November 28	at UCLA	Los Angeles Memorial Coliseum; Los Angeles, CA	L 0–14	10,000	
*Non-conference game; Source:
