= Kip Taylor =

American football player and coach (1907–2002)

- Taylor in 1951

Biographical details
- Born: November 25, 1907; Ann Arbor, Michigan, U.S.
- Died: July 17, 2002 (aged 94); Ann Arbor, Michigan, U.S.

Playing career
- 1927–1930: Michigan
- Position: End

Coaching career (HC unless noted)
- 1935–1939: George Rogers Clark HS (IN)
- 1940–1945: Pioneer HS (MI)
- 1946: Syracuse (ends)
- 1947–1948: Michigan State (ends)
- 1949–1954: Oregon State

Head coaching record
- Overall: 20–36 (college)

LaVerne Harrison "Kip" Taylor (November 25, 1907 – July 17, 2002) was an American football player and coach. He served as the head coach at Oregon State College, now Oregon State University, from 1949 to 1954, compiling a record of 20–36. He played college football as an end at the University of Michigan from 1927 to 1930.

== Playing career ==
Taylor earned all-state honors in football and basketball at Pioneer High School. He attended the University of Michigan, graduating with an education degree in 1931. There he played right end for the Wolverines. Taylor scored the first touchdown at Michigan Stadium in 1927.

== Coaching career ==
Taylor began his coaching career at the high school level. He was the head football coach at George Rogers Clark High School in Whiting, Indiana before returning to his alma mater, Pioneer High School, as head football coach in 1940. In six seasons at Pioneer, he led his teams to a record of 37–5 with undefeated seasons in 1940, 1941, and 1943. In January 1946, he was hired as an assistant coach at Syracuse University to serve under head football coach Biggie Munn.

In 1951 Taylor became the first head coach to recruit and start black players at Oregon State.

At Oregon State, Taylor's teams had a 20–36 record in his six seasons guiding the Beavers, but that included a 5–1 record against Oregon. In his first season, he led the 1949 Oregon State Beavers football team to an upset of eighth-ranked Michigan State, 25–20, when they were three-touchdown underdogs.

Under Taylor's watch the Oregon State football team was racially integrated for the first time. In 1951 he added two black players to the squad, defensive halfback Bill Anderson and halfback and safety Dave Mann. Both would start for Taylor during that season.

The single-wing formation-oriented Taylor had a poor track record as a head coach and the 1958 season was particularly disastrous, following up a season opening win against Idaho with eight consecutive losses. This included the first loss to the bitter rival University of Oregon Ducks since 1948. On November 22, 1954, with a career record at Oregon State of 20–36, Taylor and his entire staff submitted their resignations, effective July 1.

== Later life and death ==
Taylor managed the Columbia Edgewater Country Club in Portland, Oregon, and the University of Michigan Golf Course before retiring in 1972. Taylor died of natural causes on July 17, 2002, in Ann Arbor, Michigan.

== Head coaching record ==
=== College ===
| Year | Team | Overall | Conference | Standing | Bowl/playoffs |
|---|---|---|---|---|---|
Oregon State Beavers (Pacific Coast Conference) (1949–1954)
| 1949 | Oregon State | 7–3 | 5–3 | 5th | |
| 1950 | Oregon State | 3–6 | 2–5 | 8th | |
| 1951 | Oregon State | 4–6 | 3–5 | 6th | |
| 1952 | Oregon State | 2–7 | 1–6 | 9th | |
| 1953 | Oregon State | 3–6 | 3–5 | 6th | |
| 1954 | Oregon State | 1–8 | 1–6 | T–8th | |
| Oregon State: | | 20–36 | 15–30 | | |
| Total: | | 20–36 | | | |
