= 1929 Stanford football team =

American college football season

1929 Stanford football

PCC co-champion
- Conference: Pacific Coast Conference
- Record: 9–2 (5–1 PCC)
- Head coach: Pop Warner (6th season)
- Offensive scheme: Double-wing
- Home stadium: Stanford Stadium

1929 Pacific Coast Conference football standings
	Conf.					Overall
Team	W		L		T	W		L		T
No. 6 USC ^ +	6	–	1	–	0	10	–	2	–	0
Stanford +	5	–	1	–	0	9	–	2	–	0
No. 4 California +	4	–	1	–	0	7	–	1	–	1
Oregon +	4	–	1	–	0	7	–	3	–	0
Washington State	4	–	2	–	0	10	–	2	–	0
UCLA	1	–	3	–	0	4	–	4	–	0
Oregon State	1	–	4	–	0	5	–	4	–	0
Idaho	1	–	4	–	0	4	–	5	–	0
Montana	0	–	4	–	1	3	–	5	–	1
Washington	0	–	5	–	1	2	–	6	–	1
+ – Conference co-champions; ^ – Selected as Rose Bowl representative; Rankings from Dickinson System

The 1929 Stanford football team represented Stanford University in the 1929 college football season. In head coach Pop Warner's sixth season, Stanford finished as a Pacific Coast Conference co-champion. The team played its home games at Stanford Stadium in Stanford, California.

== Schedule ==
Date	Opponent	Site	Result	Attendance	Source
September 21	West Coast Army*	Stanford Stadium; Stanford, CA	W 45–0	14,000	
September 28	Olympic Club*	Stanford Stadium; Stanford, CA	W 6–0	23,000	
October 5	Oregon	Stanford Stadium; Stanford, CA	W 33–7		
October 12	at UCLA	Los Angeles Memorial Coliseum; Los Angeles, CA	W 57–0	20,000	
October 19	Oregon State	Stanford Stadium; Stanford, CA	W 40–7		
October 26	USC	Stanford Stadium; Stanford, CA (rivalry)	L 0–7	89,000	
November 2	Caltech*	Stanford Stadium; Stanford, CA	W 39–0		
November 9	at Washington	Husky Stadium; Seattle, WA	W 6–0	15,474	
November 16	Santa Clara*	Stanford Stadium; Stanford, CA	L 7–13		
November 23	California	Stanford Stadium; Stanford, CA (Big Game)	W 21–6	90,000	
December 28	Army*	Stanford Stadium; Stanford, CA	W 34–13	70,000	
*Non-conference game; Source:
