= Anthony Savage =

American athlete and coach (1893–1970)

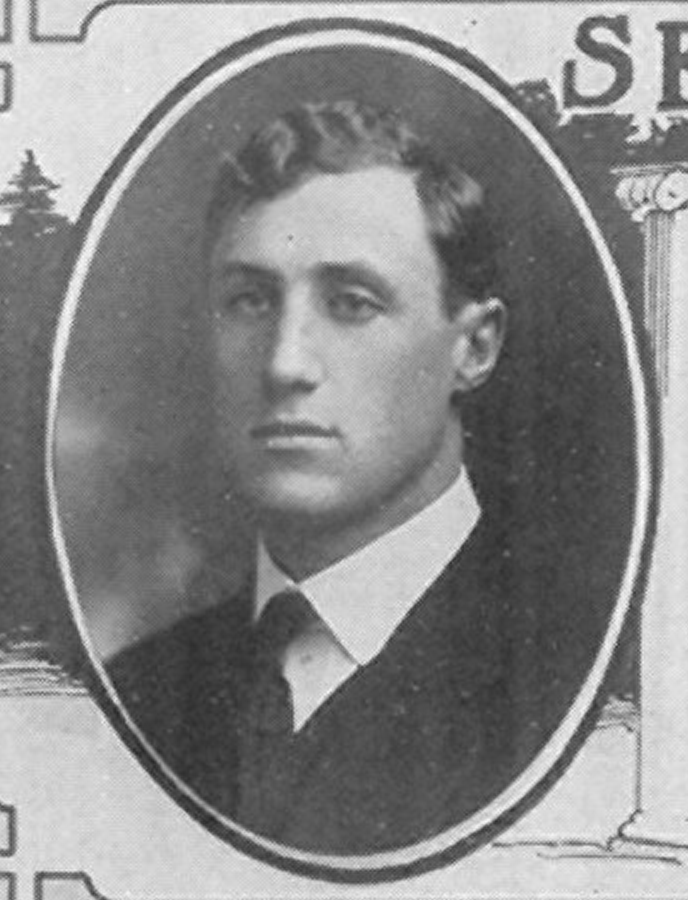
- Savage pictured as a senior in Tyee 1915, Washington yearbook

Biographical details
- Born: December 25, 1893; Buck Mountain, Pennsylvania, U.S.
- Died: January 1970 (aged 76); Seattle, Washington, U.S.

Playing career

Football
- 1914: Washington

Basketball
- 1911–1915: Washington

Baseball
- 1914: Washington
- Position: End

Coaching career (HC unless noted)

Football
- 1918: Washington
- 1919: New Mexico A&M

Basketball
- 1913–1915: Washington

Head coaching record
- Overall: 3–4–1 (football); 24–2 (basketball)

Anthony Savage (December 25, 1893 – January 1970) was an American college football and college basketball player and coach. He served as the head football coach at University of Washington in 1918 and at New Mexico College of Agriculture and Mechanic Arts—now known as New Mexico State University—in 1919, compiling a career college football head coaching record of 3–4–1. Savage played basketball at Washington from 1911 to 1915 and also coached the team for two seasons, from 1913 to 1915. He also played on the Washington baseball and football teams in 1914. He was a member of Delta Kappa Epsilon fraternity, Kappa Epsilon chapter (UW). He attended the 1914 DKE Convention in New Orleans, LA, where he received an award for having traveled the farthest to attend that convention. Savage was the older brother of another football coach, Joe Savage.

Savage return to the University of Washington in 1922 as a freshman coach.

== Head coaching record ==
=== Football ===
| Year | Team | Overall | Conference | Standing | Bowl/playoffs |
|---|---|---|---|---|---|
Washington (Pacific Coast Conference) (1918)
| 1918 | Washington | 1–1 | 1–1 | 3rd | |
| Washington: | | 1–1 | 1–1 | | |
New Mexico A&M Aggies (Independent) (1919)
| 1919 | New Mexico A&M | 2–3–1 | | | |
| New Mexico A&M: | | 2–3–1 | | | |
| Total: | | 3–4–1 | | | |
