= Jess Mortensen =

American athlete and coach (1907–1962)

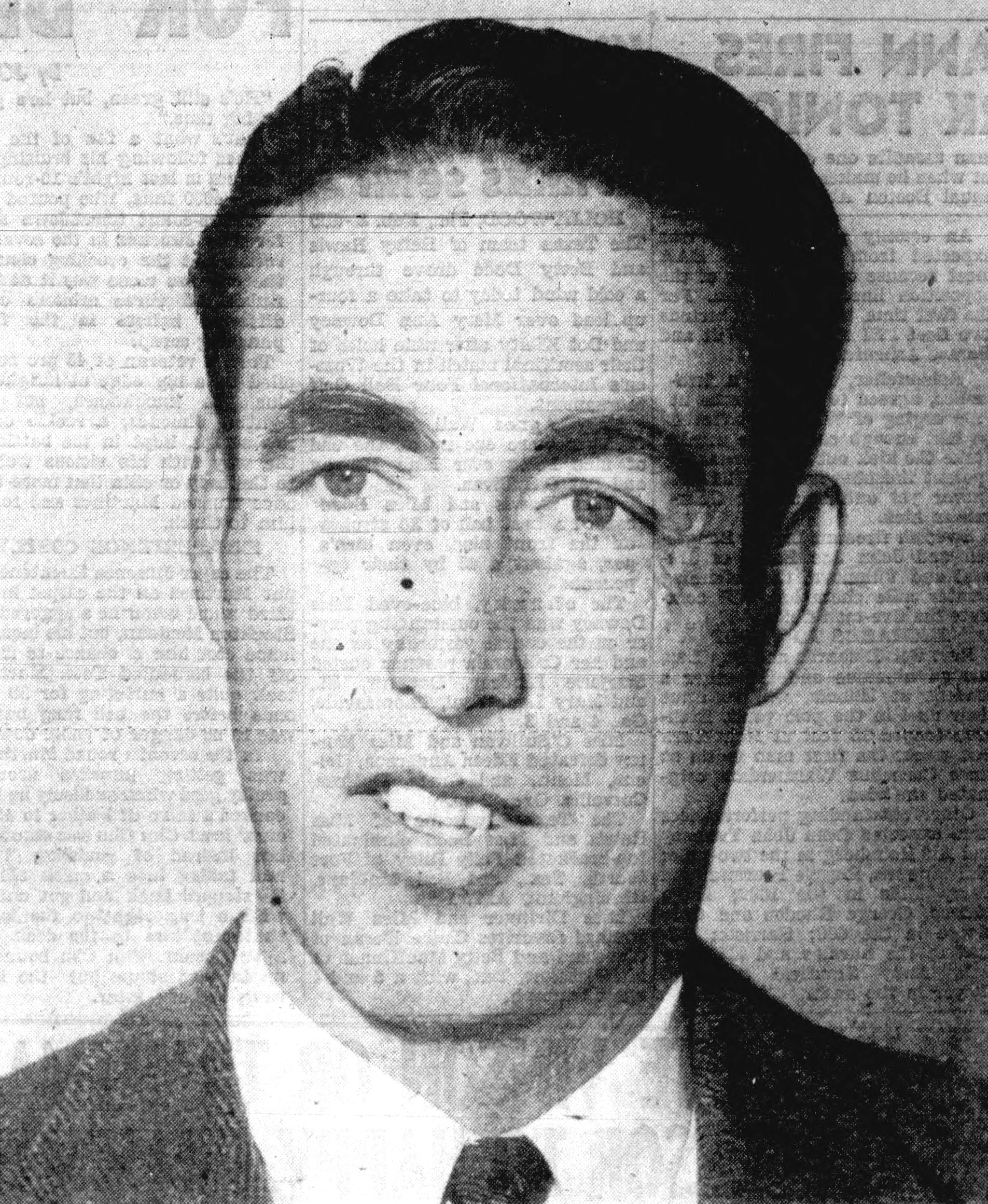
- Mortensen, c. 1951

Biographical details
- Born: April 16, 1907; Thatcher, Arizona, U.S.
- Died: February 19, 1962 (aged 54); Riverside, California, U.S.

Playing career

Football
- 1928–1929: USC

Basketball
- 1928–1930: USC

Track and field
- 1928–1930: USC
- Positions: Halfback (football); Center (basketball); Javelin throw, decathlon (track and field)

Coaching career (HC unless noted)

Football
- 1930–1942: Riverside
- 1946–1947: Riverside
- 1951–1955: USC (assistant)

Track and field
- 1948–1950: Denver
- 1950–1951: Army
- 1951–1961: USC
- 1956: US Olympic team (assistant)

Baseball
- 1931: Riverside
- 1946: Riverside

Head coaching record
- Overall: 11–13 (junior college baseball)

Accomplishments and honors

Championships
- Track and field NCAA javelin (1929); 7 NCAA (as head coach)

Awards
- 2× All-PCC basketball (1928, 1930); National Track and Field Hall of Fame (1992 ) U.S. Track & Field and Cross Country Coaches Association Coaches Hall of Fame (1996 ) USC Athletics Hall of Fame (1997)

Jesse Philo Mortensen (April 16, 1907 — February 19, 1962) was an NCAA champion track athlete and coach. Mortensen is one of only three men to win Division I Men's Outdoor Track and Field Championship team titles as both an athlete and coach.

== Biography ==
Mortensen was born in Thatcher, Arizona. He attended Gila Academy in high school and first attended Gila Junior College, now known as Eastern Arizona College, for his first collegiate competition. He competed in football, basketball, track and field, and tennis at Gila.

Mortensen transferred to the University of Southern California (USC) in 1928. While at USC, he won eight varsity letters, three each in basketball and track and field and two in football. In basketball, he was selected as an All-Pacific Coast Conference player in 1928 and 1930. In football, he played at the left halfback position and was a member of the 1929 USC Trojans football team that defeated Pittsburgh in the 1930 Rose Bowl. In track and field, Mortensen was captain of the 1930 NCAA championship track team. He won the 1929 NCAA javelin title and set a world record in the decathlon in 1931.

After graduating from USC, Mortensen held coaching positions at Riverside Junior College, with the United States Navy during World War II, and after the war at the University of Denver and the United States Military Academy. He returned to become coach of the USC track and field team in 1951. He led the USC Trojans to seven NCAA titles in his 11 years as coach (1951–1961). His teams never lost a dual meet (64-0) and never finished worse than second in the conference meet. He was an assistant U.S. men's track coach in the 1956 Olympics. He also served as an assistant football coach at USC from 1951 to 1955. He coached track at the University of Denver and the United States Military Academy.

Mortensen died on 19 February 1962, at Good Samaritan Hospital.

Mortensen is a member of the University of Southern California Athletic Hall of Fame, the National Track and Field Hall of Fame and the U.S. Track & Field and Cross Country Coaches Association Hall of Fame.

== Personal life ==
Mortensen was a member of the Church of Jesus Christ of Latter-day Saints.
