= 1929 California Golden Bears football team =

American college football season

1929 California Golden Bears football
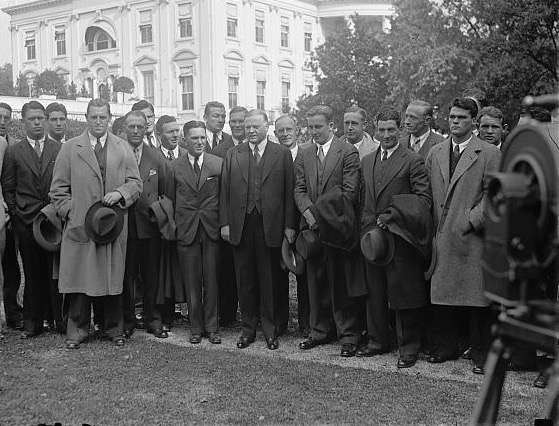

PCC co-champion
- Conference: Pacific Coast Conference
- Record: 7–1–1 (4–1 PCC)
- Head coach: Nibs Price (4th season)
- Captain: Roy Riegels
- Home stadium: California Memorial Stadium

1929 Pacific Coast Conference football standings
	Conf.					Overall
Team	W		L		T	W		L		T
No. 6 USC ^ +	6	–	1	–	0	10	–	2	–	0
Stanford +	5	–	1	–	0	9	–	2	–	0
No. 4 California +	4	–	1	–	0	7	–	1	–	1
Oregon +	4	–	1	–	0	7	–	3	–	0
Washington State	4	–	2	–	0	10	–	2	–	0
UCLA	1	–	3	–	0	4	–	4	–	0
Oregon State	1	–	4	–	0	5	–	4	–	0
Idaho	1	–	4	–	0	4	–	5	–	0
Montana	0	–	4	–	1	3	–	5	–	1
Washington	0	–	5	–	1	2	–	6	–	1
+ – Conference co-champions; ^ – Selected as Rose Bowl representative; Rankings from Dickinson System

The 1929 California Golden Bears football team was an American football team that represented the University of California, Berkeley in the Pacific Coast Conference (PCC) during the 1929 college football season. In their fourth year under head coach Nibs Price, the team compiled a 7–1–1 record (4–1 against PCC opponents), finished in a four-way tie for the PCC championship, and outscored its opponents by a combined total of 155 to 78.

== Schedule ==
Date	Opponent	Site	Result	Attendance	Source
September 28	Santa Clara*	California Memorial Stadium; Berkeley, CA	W 27–6	40,000	
October 5	Saint Mary's*	California Memorial Stadium; Berkeley, CA	T 0–0	70,000	
October 12	Washington State	California Memorial Stadium; Berkeley, CA	W 14–0	40,000	
October 19	at Penn*	Franklin Field; Philadelphia, PA	W 12–7	72,000	
October 26	Olympic Club*	California Memorial Stadium; Berkeley, CA	W 21–19		
November 2	at USC	Los Angeles Memorial Coliseum; Los Angeles, CA	W 15–7	79,000	
November 9	Montana	California Memorial Stadium; Berkeley, CA	W 53–18	25,000	
November 16	Washington	California Memorial Stadium; Berkeley, CA	W 7–0	50,000	
November 23	at Stanford	Stanford Stadium; Stanford, CA (Big Game)	L 6–21	90,000	
*Non-conference game; Source:
