= 1949 Stanford Indians football team =

American college football season

1949 Stanford Indians football

Pineapple Bowl champion

Pineapple Bowl, W 74–20 vs. Hawaii
- Conference: Pacific Coast Conference
- Record: 7–3–1 (4–2 PCC)
- Head coach: Marchmont Schwartz (5th season)
- Home stadium: Stanford Stadium

1949 Pacific Coast Conference football standings
| | Conf. | | | | | Overall |
| Team | W | | L | | T | W | | L | | T |
|---|---|---|---|---|---|---|---|---|---|---|
| No. 3 California $ | 7 | – | 0 | – | 0 | 10 | – | 1 | – | 0 |
| UCLA | 5 | – | 2 | – | 0 | 6 | – | 3 | – | 0 |
| Stanford | 4 | – | 2 | – | 0 | 7 | – | 3 | – | 1 |
| USC | 4 | – | 2 | – | 0 | 5 | – | 3 | – | 1 |
| Oregon State | 5 | – | 3 | – | 0 | 7 | – | 3 | – | 0 |
| Oregon | 2 | – | 5 | – | 0 | 4 | – | 6 | – | 0 |
| Washington | 2 | – | 5 | – | 0 | 3 | – | 7 | – | 0 |
| Washington State | 2 | – | 6 | – | 0 | 3 | – | 6 | – | 0 |
| Idaho | 1 | – | 4 | – | 0 | 3 | – | 5 | – | 0 |
| Montana | 0 | – | 3 | – | 0 | 5 | – | 4 | – | 0 |
$ – Conference champion; Rankings from AP Poll

The 1949 Stanford Indians football team represented Stanford University in the 1949 college football season. Stanford was led by fifth-year head coach Marchmont Schwartz. The team was a member of the Pacific Coast Conference and played their home games at Stanford Stadium in Stanford, California.

== Schedule ==
| Date | Opponent | Rank | Site | Result | Attendance | Source |
|---|---|---|---|---|---|---|
| September 17 | San Jose State* | | Stanford Stadium; Stanford, CA (rivalry) | W 49–0 | 27,000 | |
| September 24 | Harvard* | | Stanford Stadium; Stanford, CA | W 44–0 | 8,000 | |
| October 1 | Michigan* | | Stanford Stadium; Stanford, CA | L 7–27 | 87,123 | |
| October 8 | No. 18 UCLA | | Stanford Stadium; Stanford, CA | L 7–14 | 40,000 | |
| October 15 | at Washington | | Husky Stadium; Seattle, WA | W 40–0 | 33,500 | |
| October 22 | Oregon State | | Stanford Stadium; Stanford, CA | W 27–7 | 25,000 | |
| October 29 | Santa Clara* | | Stanford Stadium; Stanford, CA | T 7–7 | 45,000 | |
| November 5 | at No. 12 USC | | Los Angeles Memorial Coliseum; Los Angeles, CA (rivalry) | W 34–13 | 70,041 | |
| November 12 | Idaho | No. 17 | Stanford Stadium; Stanford, CA | W 63–0 | 12,000 | |
| November 19 | No. 3 California | No. 12 | Stanford Stadium; Stanford, CA (Big Game) | L 14–33 | 91,000 | |
| January 2, 1950 | vs. Hawaii* | | Honolulu Stadium; Honolulu, Territory of Hawaii (Pineapple Bowl) | W 74–20 | 20,000 | |
*Non-conference game; Rankings from AP Poll released prior to the game; Source:

== Rankings ==
Ranking movements Legend: ██ Increase in ranking ██ Decrease in ranking — = Not ranked
| | Week | | | | | | | | |
| Poll | 1 | 2 | 3 | 4 | 5 | 6 | 7 | 8 | Final |
|---|---|---|---|---|---|---|---|---|---|
| AP | — | — | — | — | — | 17 | 12 | 12 | — |

== Game summaries ==
Program for the October 22 game against the Oregon State Beavers.

=== Harvard ===
This season marked the only time that Stanford and Harvard played each other, with the Indians winning handily, 44–0. It was Harvard's second-ever West Coast game, after their victory in 1920 Rose Bowl. A second game, to be played at Harvard Stadium, was scheduled for the 1950 season, but was canceled by Harvard to lighten what was characterized as a "far too heavy" schedule."

=== California ===
In the Big Game, California was ranked No. 3 and had gone to the Rose Bowl the previous season. Stanford came into the game with one conference loss; a win over Cal would have given them a tie for the conference championship and a possible bid to the Rose Bowl. But although the Indians managed a 7–6 halftime lead, the Bears took control in the second half, going on to win 33–14 and securing a return to the Rose Bowl.

=== Pineapple Bowl ===
Stanford was invited to the Pineapple Bowl following the season. As this bowl always matched Hawaii against a mainland team, Stanford does not count the game as a postseason bowl. Stanford jumped out to a 20-point first quarter lead, and tacked on six fourth quarter touchdowns to win handily, 74–20.

== Players drafted by the NFL ==
| Player | Position | Round | Pick | NFL club |
| Rupert Andrews | Back | 18 | 232 | Chicago Bears |
| Bill DeYoung | Back | 24 | 302 | New York Yanks |
