= 1918 Oregon Agricultural Aggies football team =

American college football season

1918 Oregon Agricultural Aggies football
- Conference: Pacific Coast Conference
- Record: 2–4 (0–2 PCC)
- Head coach: Homer Woodson Hargiss (1st season)
- Captain: Raymond Archibald
- Home stadium: Bell Field

1918 Pacific Coast Conference football standings
| | Conf. | | | | | Overall |
| Team | W | | L | | T | W | | L | | T |
|---|---|---|---|---|---|---|---|---|---|---|
| California $ | 2 | – | 0 | – | 0 | 7 | – | 2 | – | 0 |
| Oregon | 2 | – | 1 | – | 0 | 4 | – | 2 | – | 0 |
| Washington | 1 | – | 1 | – | 0 | 1 | – | 1 | – | 0 |
| Oregon Agricultural | 0 | – | 2 | – | 0 | 2 | – | 4 | – | 0 |
$ – Conference champion

The 1918 Oregon Agricultural Aggies football team represented Oregon Agricultural College (now known as Oregon State University) in the Pacific Coast Conference (PCC) during the 1918 college football season. In their first season under head coach Homer Woodson Hargiss, the Aggies compiled a 2–4 record (0–2 against PCC opponents), finished in last place in the PCC, and were outscored by their opponents by a combined total of 46 to 33. The team played its home games at Bell Field in Corvallis, Oregon. Meier Newman was the team captain.

== Schedule ==
| Date | Time | Opponent | Site | Result | Attendance | Source |
|---|---|---|---|---|---|---|
| October 12 | | Vancouver Barracks* | Bell Field; Corvallis, OR | W 7–0 | | |
| November 2 | | at Camp Lewis* | Camp Lewis; Tacoma, WA | L 6–21 | | |
| November 9 | | Standifer Construction Company* | Bell Field; Corvallis, OR | W 14–0 | | |
| November 16 | | Oregon | Bell Field; Corvallis, OR (rivalry) | L 6–13 | 5,000 | |
| November 23 | | at Washington | Denny Field; Seattle, WA | L 0–6 | 3,000 | |
| November 28 | 2:30 p.m. | at Multnomah Athletic Club* | Multnomah Field; Portland, OR | L 0–6 | 1,500 | |
*Non-conference game; All times are in Pacific time
