= 1918 California Golden Bears football team =

American college football season

1918 California Golden Bears football

PCC champion
- Conference: Pacific Coast Conference
- Record: 7–2 (2–0 PCC)
- Head coach: Andy Smith (3rd season)
- Offensive scheme: Short-punt
- Captain: Carlton G. Wells
- Home stadium: California Field

1918 Pacific Coast Conference football standings
	Conf.					Overall
Team	W		L		T	W		L		T
California $	2	–	0	–	0	7	–	2	–	0
Oregon	2	–	1	–	0	4	–	2	–	0
Washington	1	–	1	–	0	1	–	1	–	0
Oregon Agricultural	0	–	2	–	0	2	–	4	–	0
$ – Conference champion

The 1918 California Golden Bears football team was an American football team that represented the University of California, Berkeley in the Pacific Coast Conference (PCC) during the 1918 college football season. In their third year under head coach Andy Smith, the team compiled a 7–2 record (2–0 against PCC opponents), won the PCC championship, and outscored its opponents by a combined total of 186 to 62.

== Schedule ==
Date	Opponent	Site	Result	Attendance	Source
October 5	Fort McDowell*	California Field; Berkeley, CA	L 7–21		
October 12	San Francisco Presidio*	California Field; Berkeley, CA	W 13–7		
October 19	Fort Scott*	California Field; Berkeley, CA	W 1–0		
November 9	Saint Mary's*	California Field; Berkeley, CA	W 40–14		
November 15	Mather Field*	California Field; Berkeley, CA	L 0–13		
November 23	Oregon	California Field; Berkeley, CA	W 6–0		
November 28	Stanford	California Field; Berkeley, CA	W 67–0		
December 7	San Pedro Navy*	California Field; Berkeley, CA	W 20–0		
December 14	at USC*	Bovard Field; Los Angeles, CA	W 33–7	10,000	
*Non-conference game
