= 1949 USC Trojans football team =

American college football season

1949 USC Trojans football
- Conference: Pacific Coast Conference
- Record: 5–3–1 (4–2 PCC)
- Head coach: Jeff Cravath (8th season)
- Home stadium: Los Angeles Memorial Coliseum

1949 Pacific Coast Conference football standings
	Conf.					Overall
Team	W		L		T	W		L		T
No. 3 California $	7	–	0	–	0	10	–	1	–	0
UCLA	5	–	2	–	0	6	–	3	–	0
Stanford	4	–	2	–	0	7	–	3	–	1
USC	4	–	2	–	0	5	–	3	–	1
Oregon State	5	–	3	–	0	7	–	3	–	0
Oregon	2	–	5	–	0	4	–	6	–	0
Washington	2	–	5	–	0	3	–	7	–	0
Washington State	2	–	6	–	0	3	–	6	–	0
Idaho	1	–	4	–	0	3	–	5	–	0
Montana	0	–	3	–	0	5	–	4	–	0
$ – Conference champion; Rankings from AP Poll

The 1949 USC Trojans football team represented the University of Southern California (USC) in the 1949 college football season. In their eighth year under head coach Jeff Cravath, the Trojans compiled a 5–3–1 record (4–2 against conference opponents), finished in a tie for third place in the Pacific Coast Conference, and outscored their opponents by a combined total of 214 to 170.

== Schedule ==
Date	Opponent	Rank	Site	Result	Attendance	Source
September 24	Navy*		Los Angeles Memorial Coliseum; Los Angeles, CA	W 42–20	62,787	
October 1	Washington State		Los Angeles Memorial Coliseum; Los Angeles, CA	W 35–7	36,243	
October 8	No. 11 Ohio State*	No. 8	Los Angeles Memorial Coliseum; Los Angeles, CA	T 13–13	62,877	
October 15	at No. 9 California	No. 12	California Memorial Stadium; Berkeley, CA	L 10–16	81,500	
October 22	Oregon	No. 19	Los Angeles Memorial Coliseum; Los Angeles, CA	W 40–13	47,098	
October 29	at Washington	No. 15	Husky Stadium; Seattle, WA	W 40–28	33,500	
November 5	Stanford^{†}	No. 12	Los Angeles Memorial Coliseum; Los Angeles, CA (rivalry)	L 13–34	70,041	
November 19	UCLA		Los Angeles Memorial Coliseum; Los Angeles, CA (Victory Bell)	W 21–7	75,026	
November 26	at No. 1 Notre Dame*	No. 17	Notre Dame Stadium; Notre Dame, IN (rivalry)	L 0–32	57,214	
*Non-conference game; ^{†}Homecoming; Rankings from AP Poll released prior to the game; Source:

== Rankings ==
Ranking movements Legend: ██ Increase in ranking ██ Decrease in ranking — = Not ranked
	Week								
Poll	1	2	3	4	5	6	7	8	Final
AP	8	12	19	15	12	—	—	17	—

== Coaching staff ==
- Head coach: Jeff Cravath
- Assistant coaches: Roy "Bullet" Baker (backfield coach), Ray George (line coach), Sam Barry (head scout), Bill Fisk (end coach), Walt Hargesheimer (backfield coach), Harry Smith (freshman coach)

== Roster ==
- HB #16 Frank Gifford, So.
