= 1929 USC Trojans football team =

American college football season

1929 USC Trojans football

National champion (Berryman, Houlgate) Co-national champion (Sagarin) PCC co-champion Rose Bowl champion

Rose Bowl, W 47–14 vs. Pittsburgh
- Conference: Pacific Coast Conference
- Record: 10–2 (6–1 PCC)
- Head coach: Howard Jones (5th season)
- Offensive scheme: Single-wing
- Captain: Nate Barragar
- Home stadium: Los Angeles Memorial Coliseum

1929 Pacific Coast Conference football standings
| | Conf. | | | | | Overall |
| Team | W | | L | | T | W | | L | | T |
|---|---|---|---|---|---|---|---|---|---|---|
| No. 6 USC ^ + | 6 | – | 1 | – | 0 | 10 | – | 2 | – | 0 |
| Stanford + | 5 | – | 1 | – | 0 | 9 | – | 2 | – | 0 |
| No. 4 California + | 4 | – | 1 | – | 0 | 7 | – | 1 | – | 1 |
| Oregon + | 4 | – | 1 | – | 0 | 7 | – | 3 | – | 0 |
| Washington State | 4 | – | 2 | – | 0 | 10 | – | 2 | – | 0 |
| UCLA | 1 | – | 3 | – | 0 | 4 | – | 4 | – | 0 |
| Oregon State | 1 | – | 4 | – | 0 | 5 | – | 4 | – | 0 |
| Idaho | 1 | – | 4 | – | 0 | 4 | – | 5 | – | 0 |
| Montana | 0 | – | 4 | – | 1 | 3 | – | 5 | – | 1 |
| Washington | 0 | – | 5 | – | 1 | 2 | – | 6 | – | 1 |
+ – Conference co-champions; ^ – Selected as Rose Bowl representative; Rankings from Dickinson System

The 1929 USC Trojans football team represented the University of Southern California (USC) in the 1929 college football season. In their fifth year under head coach Howard Jones, the Trojans compiled a 10–2 record (6–1 against conference opponents), were Pacific Coast Conference co-champions, and outscored their opponents by a combined total of 492 to 69. The team defeated Pittsburgh 47–14 in the 1930 Rose Bowl and was retroactively selected as the 1929 national champion under the Houlgate System and also retroactively selected as the national champion under the Berryman QPRS system and as a co-national champion by Jeff Sagarin.

== Schedule ==
| Date | Opponent | Site | Result | Attendance | Source |
|---|---|---|---|---|---|
| September 28 | UCLA | Los Angeles Memorial Coliseum; Los Angeles, CA (Victory Bell) | W 76–0 | 35,000–50,000 | |
| October 5 | Oregon State | Los Angeles Memorial Coliseum; Los Angeles, CA | W 19–0 | 40,000 | |
| October 12 | at Washington | Husky Stadium; Seattle, WA | W 48–0 | 23,582 | |
| October 19 | Occidental* | Los Angeles Memorial Coliseum; Los Angeles, CA | W 64–0 | 20,000 | |
| October 26 | at Stanford | Stanford Stadium; Stanford, CA (rivalry) | W 7–0 | 89,000 | |
| November 2 | California | Los Angeles Memorial Coliseum; Los Angeles, CA | L 7–15 | 79,000 | |
| November 9 | Nevada* | Los Angeles Memorial Coliseum; Los Angeles, CA | W 66–0 | 20,000 | |
| November 16 | vs. Notre Dame* | Soldier Field; Chicago, IL (rivalry) | L 12–13 | 120,000–123,000 | |
| November 23 | Idaho | Los Angeles Memorial Coliseum; Los Angeles, CA | W 72–0 | 20,000 | |
| November 30 | Washington State | Los Angeles Memorial Coliseum; Los Angeles, CA | W 27–7 | 35,000 | |
| December 14 | Carnegie Tech*^{†} | Los Angeles Memorial Coliseum; Los Angeles, CA | W 45–13 | 65,000 | |
| January 1, 1930 | vs. Pittsburgh* | Rose Bowl; Pasadena, CA (Rose Bowl) | W 47–14 | 72,000 | |
*Non-conference game; ^{†}Homecoming

== Game summaries ==
=== UCLA ===
- Russ Saunders 14 rushes, 234 yards

== Roster ==
- Frank Anthony, T
- Marger Apsit, HB
- Garrett Arbelbide, HB-E
- Nate Barragar, C
- Johnny Baker, G
- Henry Becker, HB
- Ward Bond, T
- Everett Brown, QB
- Mahlon Chambers, QB
- George Decker, T
- Vaughn Deranian, G
- Marshall Duffield, QB
- Harvey Durkee, E
- George Dye, C
- Harry Edelson, HB
- Clark Galloway, G
- Robert Gowder, G
- Robert H. Hall, T
- Harold Hammack, HB
- Jess Hill, FB
- Cecil Wayne Hoff, T
- J. Howard Joslin, E
- Anthony Jurich, HB
- Rockwell Kemp, QB
- William Karl Kreiger, E
- Thomas Mallory, HB
- Jess Mortensen, HB
- Don Moses, FB
- Jim Musick, FB
- David Neidhardt, C
- Erny Pinckert, HB
- Russ Saunders, FB
- William Seitz, T
- Gaius Shaver, QB
- Jesse Shaw, T
- Barry Stephens, HB
- Tony Steponovich, E
- Francis Tappaan, E
- George Templeton, C
- Cliff Thiede, QB
- James Truher, E
- John Ward, T
- Julian Whittier, G
- Ralph O. Wilcox, E
- Thomas Wilcox, FB
- Stan Williamson, C
- Charles R. Willingham, FB
- John Irving Winfield, G
