= 1949 Washington State Cougars football team =

American college football season

1949 Washington State Cougars football
- Conference: Pacific Coast Conference
- Record: 3–6 (2–6 PCC)
- Head coach: Phil Sarboe (5th season)
- Home stadium: Rogers Field

1949 Pacific Coast Conference football standings
	Conf.					Overall
Team	W		L		T	W		L		T
No. 3 California $	7	–	0	–	0	10	–	1	–	0
UCLA	5	–	2	–	0	6	–	3	–	0
Stanford	4	–	2	–	0	7	–	3	–	1
USC	4	–	2	–	0	5	–	3	–	1
Oregon State	5	–	3	–	0	7	–	3	–	0
Oregon	2	–	5	–	0	4	–	6	–	0
Washington	2	–	5	–	0	3	–	7	–	0
Washington State	2	–	6	–	0	3	–	6	–	0
Idaho	1	–	4	–	0	3	–	5	–	0
Montana	0	–	3	–	0	5	–	4	–	0
$ – Conference champion; Rankings from AP Poll

The 1949 Washington State Cougars football team was an American football team that represented Washington State College during the 1949 college football season. In his fifth and final year as head coach, Phil Sarboe led the team to a 2–6 mark in the Pacific Coast Conference (PCC) and 3–6 overall.

The Cougars' four home games were played on campus in Pullman at Rogers Field, with a nearby road game in Moscow against Palouse neighbor Idaho. Washington State opened with two wins at home but ended the season on a four-game losing streak.

Sarboe resigned after the season in early December, then coached at North Central High School in Spokane. He was succeeded at WSC in late January by 31-year-old Forest Evashevski, the backfield coach at Michigan State under Biggie Munn and a former back at Michigan under Fritz Crisler.

== Schedule ==
Date	Opponent	Site	Result	Attendance	Source
September 17	Utah State*	Rogers Field; Pullman, WA	W 33–0	9,500	
September 24	Montana	Rogers Field; Pullman, WA	W 13–7	7,000	
October 1	at USC	Los Angeles Memorial Coliseum; Los Angeles, CA	L 7–35	36,243	
October 8	Oregon	Rogers Field; Pullman, WA	L 0–21	16,000	
October 15	at Idaho	Neale Stadium; Moscow, ID (rivalry)	W 35–13	21,500	
October 22	UCLA	Rogers Field; Pullman, WA	L 20–27	21,000	
October 29	at Oregon State	Bell Field; Corvallis, OR	L 6–35	15,000	
November 5	at No. 4 California	California Memorial Stadium; Berkeley, CA	L 14–33	33,000	
November 19	at Washington	Husky Stadium; Seattle, WA (rivalry)	L 21–34	35,150	
*Non-conference game; Rankings from AP Poll released prior to the game; Source:
