= 1949 California Golden Bears football team =

American college football season

1949 California Golden Bears football

PCC champion

Rose Bowl, L 14–17 vs. Ohio State
- Conference: Pacific Coast Conference

Ranking
- AP: No. 3
- Record: 10–1 (7–0 PCC)
- Head coach: Pappy Waldorf (3rd season)
- Offensive scheme: Single-wing
- Home stadium: California Memorial Stadium

1949 Pacific Coast Conference football standings
	Conf.					Overall
Team	W		L		T	W		L		T
No. 3 California $	7	–	0	–	0	10	–	1	–	0
UCLA	5	–	2	–	0	6	–	3	–	0
Stanford	4	–	2	–	0	7	–	3	–	1
USC	4	–	2	–	0	5	–	3	–	1
Oregon State	5	–	3	–	0	7	–	3	–	0
Oregon	2	–	5	–	0	4	–	6	–	0
Washington	2	–	5	–	0	3	–	7	–	0
Washington State	2	–	6	–	0	3	–	6	–	0
Idaho	1	–	4	–	0	3	–	5	–	0
Montana	0	–	3	–	0	5	–	4	–	0
$ – Conference champion; Rankings from AP Poll

The 1949 California Golden Bears football team was an American football team that represented the University of California, Berkeley in the Pacific Coast Conference (PCC) during the 1949 college football season. In their third year under head coach Pappy Waldorf, the Golden Bears compiled a 10–1 record (7–0 in PCC, first), won a second straight conference title, lost to Ohio State in the Rose Bowl, and outscored its opponents 319 to 131. Home games were played on campus at California Memorial Stadium in Berkeley, California.

California was ranked third in the final AP poll, released in late November.

== Schedule ==
Date	Opponent	Rank	Site	Result	Attendance	Source
September 17	Santa Clara*		California Memorial Stadium; Berkeley, CA	W 21–7	62,000	
September 24	Saint Mary's*		California Memorial Stadium; Berkeley, CA	W 29–7	50,000	
October 1	at Oregon State		Multnomah Stadium; Portland, OR	W 41–0	18,885	
October 8	at Wisconsin*	No. 10	Camp Randall Stadium; Madison, WI	W 35–20	45,000	
October 15	No. 12 USC	No. 9	California Memorial Stadium; Berkeley, CA	W 16–10	81,500	
October 22	Washington	No. 5	California Memorial Stadium; Berkeley, CA	W 21–7	40,000	
October 29	at No. 20 UCLA	No. 4	Los Angeles Memorial Coliseum; Los Angeles, CA (rivalry)	W 35–21	58,668	
November 5	Washington State	No. 4	California Memorial Stadium; Berkeley, CA	W 33–14	33,000	
November 12	Oregon	No. 4	California Memorial Stadium; Berkeley, CA	W 41–14	78,000	
November 19	at No. 12 Stanford	No. 3	Stanford Stadium; Stanford, CA (Big Game)	W 33–14	91,000	
January 2, 1950	No. 6 Ohio State*	No. 3	Rose Bowl; Pasadena, CA (Rose Bowl)	L 14–17	100,963	
*Non-conference game; Rankings from AP Poll released prior to the game; Source:

== Rankings ==
Ranking movements Legend: ██ Increase in ranking ██ Decrease in ranking ( ) = First-place votes
	Week								
Poll	1	2	3	4	5	6	7	8	Final
AP	10	9	5	4	4 (4)	4 (3)	3 (5)	2 (24)	3

== After the season ==
The following Golden Bears were selected in the 1950 NFL draft after the season.

Round	Pick	Player	Position	NFL club
10	127	Bob Celeri	Back	San Francisco 49ers
17	214	Jim Cullom	Guard	Washington Redskins
19	245	Forest Klein	Guard	San Francisco 49ers
26	339	Rod Franz	Guard	Philadelphia Eagles
29	373	Bill Montagne	Back	Chicago Cardinals
