= 1918 Washington football team =

American college football season

1918 Washington football
- Conference: Pacific Coast Conference
- Record: 1–1 (1–1 PCC)
- Head coach: Anthony Savage (1st season)
- Captain: George Smith
- Home stadium: Denny Field

1918 Pacific Coast Conference football standings
	Conf.					Overall
Team	W		L		T	W		L		T
California $	2	–	0	–	0	7	–	2	–	0
Oregon	2	–	1	–	0	4	–	2	–	0
Washington	1	–	1	–	0	1	–	1	–	0
Oregon Agricultural	0	–	2	–	0	2	–	4	–	0
$ – Conference champion

The 1918 Washington football team was an American football team that represented the University of Washington during the 1918 college football season. In its first season under coach Anthony Savage, the team compiled a 1–1 record and was outscored by its opponents by a combined total of 7 to 6. George Smith was the team captain.

The two games were played after the Armistice was signed on November 11 to end World War I.

== Schedule ==
Date	Opponent	Site	Result	Attendance	Source
November 23	Oregon Agricultural	Denny Field; Seattle, WA	W 6–0	3,000	
November 30	Oregon	Denny Field; Seattle, WA (rivalry)	L 0–7	5,000	
