= 1918 Oregon Webfoots football team =

American college football season

1918 Oregon Webfoots football
- Conference: Pacific Coast Conference
- Record: 4–2 (2–1 PCC)
- Head coach: Charles A. Huntington (1st season)
- Captain: Dow Wilson
- Home stadium: Kincaid Field

1918 Pacific Coast Conference football standings
	Conf.					Overall
Team	W		L		T	W		L		T
California $	2	–	0	–	0	7	–	2	–	0
Oregon	2	–	1	–	0	4	–	2	–	0
Washington	1	–	1	–	0	1	–	1	–	0
Oregon Agricultural	0	–	2	–	0	2	–	4	–	0
$ – Conference champion

The 1918 Oregon Webfoots football team represented the University of Oregon in the Pacific Coast Conference (PCC) during the 1918 college football season. In their first season under head coach Charles A. Huntington, the Webfoots compiled a 4–2 record (2–1 against PCC opponents), finished in second place in the PCC, and outscored their opponents, 81 to 35. The team played its home games at Kincaid Field in Eugene, Oregon.

== Schedule ==
Date	Opponent	Site	Result	Attendance	Source
October 12	Multnomah Athletic Club*	Kincaid Field; Eugene, OR	L 0–20		
November 2	Foundation Shipbuilders*	Kincaid Field; Eugene, OR	W 40–0		
November 9	at Fort Lewis*	Lewis Athletic Field; Tacoma, WA	W 20–3		
November 16	at Oregon Agricultural	Bell Field; Corvallis, OR (rivalry)	W 13–6	5,000	
November 23	at California	California Field; Berkeley, CA	L 0–6		
November 30	at Washington	Denny Field; Seattle, WA (rivalry)	W 7–0	5,000	
*Non-conference game
