= 1949 Idaho Vandals football team =

American college football season

1949 Idaho Vandals football
- Conference: Pacific Coast Conference
- Record: 3–5 (1–4 PCC)
- Head coach: Dixie Howell (3rd season)
- Home stadium: Neale Stadium

1949 Pacific Coast Conference football standings
	Conf.					Overall
Team	W		L		T	W		L		T
No. 3 California $	7	–	0	–	0	10	–	1	–	0
UCLA	5	–	2	–	0	6	–	3	–	0
Stanford	4	–	2	–	0	7	–	3	–	1
USC	4	–	2	–	0	5	–	3	–	1
Oregon State	5	–	3	–	0	7	–	3	–	0
Oregon	2	–	5	–	0	4	–	6	–	0
Washington	2	–	5	–	0	3	–	7	–	0
Washington State	2	–	6	–	0	3	–	6	–	0
Idaho	1	–	4	–	0	3	–	5	–	0
Montana	0	–	3	–	0	5	–	4	–	0
$ – Conference champion; Rankings from AP Poll

The 1949 Idaho Vandals football team represented the University of Idaho as a member for the Pacific Coast Conference (PCC) During the 1949 college football season. Led by third-year head coach Dixie Howell, the Vandals compiled an overall record of 3–5 with a mark of 1–4 in conference play, placing ninth in the PCC. The team played home game on campus, at Neale Stadium in Moscow, Idaho.

The Vandals' losing streak in the Battle of the Palouse with neighbor Washington State reached 21 games, with a 35–13 homecoming loss in Moscow. Idaho tied the Cougars the next year, but the winless streak continued until five years later. In the rivalry game with Montana in Missoula the following week, Idaho won 47–19 to retain the Little Brown Stein in the Grizzlies' last year in the PCC. Montana returned the favor in Moscow the next year with a one-point upset, then the Vandals won eight straight, through 1959.

Babe Curfman was hired as the ends coach in February 1949; he became head coach in April 1951.

== Schedule ==
Date	Time	Opponent	Site	Result	Attendance	Source
September 17	12:45 pm	Willamette*	Neale Stadium; Moscow, ID	W 79–0	5,000	
September 24	2:00 pm	at Oregon	Hayward Field; Eugene, OR	L 0–41	18,300	
October 1	12:00 pm	at Texas*	Memorial Stadium; Austin, TX	L 7–56		
October 15	2:00 pm	Washington State^{†}	Neale Stadium; Moscow, ID (rivalry)	L 13–35	21,500	
October 22	1:00 pm	at Montana	Dornblaser Field; Missoula, MT (rivalry)	W 47–19	8,500	
October 29	1:00 pm	vs. Portland*	Public School Field; Boise, ID	W 49–21		
November 5	2:00 pm	Oregon State	Neale Stadium; Moscow, ID	L 25–35	9,000	
November 12	2:00 pm	at Stanford	Stanford Stadium; Stanford, CA	L 0–63	12,000	
*Non-conference game; ^{†}Homecoming; All times are in Pacific time; Source:

== Coaching staff ==
- Bill Godwin, tackles
- Gene Harlow, guards
- Raymond A. Curfman, ends
- Steve Belko, freshmen

== All-conference ==
Tackle Carl Kiilsgaard was named to the All-Coast team; honorable mention were tackle Will Overgaard, guard Roy Colquitt, quarterback John Brogan, and halfback Jerry Diehl.

Kiilsgaard was invited to play in the College All-Star Game in Chicago, held in August 1950; in which the College All-Stars defeated the Philadelphia Eagles, the defending NFL champions.

== NFL draft ==
Two seniors from the 1949 Vandals were selected in the 1950 NFL draft:

Player	Position	Round	Pick	Franchise
Carl Kiilsgaard	T	5th	61	Chicago Cardinals
Jerry Diehl	HB	28th	360	Pittsburgh Steelers

Three juniors were selected in the 1951 NFL draft:

Player	Position	Round	Pick	Franchise
Bill Fray	T	16th	191	New York Yanks
King Block	FB	21st	250	Detroit Lions
Jim Chadband	HB	28th	335	New York Yanks

One sophomore was selected in the 1952 NFL draft:

Player	Position	Round	Pick	Franchise
Glen Christian	HB	9th	105	San Francisco 49ers
