= 1949 Oregon State Beavers football team =

American college football season

1949 Oregon State Beavers football
- Head coach Kip Taylor
- Conference: Pacific Coast Conference
- Record: 7–3 (5–3 PCC)
- Head coach: Kip Taylor (1st season)
- Home stadium: Bell Field; Multnomah Stadium

1949 Pacific Coast Conference football standings
	Conf.					Overall
Team	W		L		T	W		L		T
No. 3 California $	7	–	0	–	0	10	–	1	–	0
UCLA	5	–	2	–	0	6	–	3	–	0
Stanford	4	–	2	–	0	7	–	3	–	1
USC	4	–	2	–	0	5	–	3	–	1
Oregon State	5	–	3	–	0	7	–	3	–	0
Oregon	2	–	5	–	0	4	–	6	–	0
Washington	2	–	5	–	0	3	–	7	–	0
Washington State	2	–	6	–	0	3	–	6	–	0
Idaho	1	–	4	–	0	3	–	5	–	0
Montana	0	–	3	–	0	5	–	4	–	0
$ – Conference champion; Rankings from AP Poll

The 1949 Oregon State Beavers football team represented Oregon State College as a member of the Pacific Coast Conference (PCC) during the 1949 college football season. In their first season under head coach Kip Taylor, the Beavers compiled an overall record of 7–3 with a mark of 5–3 in conference play, placed fifth in the PCC, and outscored their opponents 232 to 188. The team played one home game on campus at Bell Field in Corvallis and three at Multnomah Stadium in Portland.

Taylor, a Michigan State assistant, was hired in late March, following the resignation of longtime head coach Lon Stiner a month earlier. Taylor was a native of Ann Arbor, Michigan, and played for the Michigan Wolverines in the late 1920s. At the time of his hiring, he told the press: "I'm a Michigan man and I like the Michigan system. We'll have the single wingback, in all probability, with my own variations."

Program for the October 22 game visiting the Stanford Indians.

Halfback Ken Carpenter was the offensive star of the 1949 OSC team.

== Schedule ==
Date	Opponent	Site	Result	Attendance	Source
September 16	at UCLA	Los Angeles Memorial Coliseum; Los Angeles, CA	L 13–35	37,427	
September 24	Utah*	Multnomah Stadium; Portland, OR	W 27–7	25,012	
October 1	California	Multnomah Stadium; Portland, OR	L 0–41	18,885	
October 8	at Washington	Husky Stadium; Seattle, WA	W 7–3	27,000	
October 15	Montana	Bell Field; Corvallis, OR	W 63–14	8,000	
October 22	at Stanford	Stanford Stadium; Stanford, CA	L 7–27	25,000	
October 29	Washington State	Bell Field; Corvallis, OR	W 35–6	15,000	
November 5	at Idaho	Neale Stadium; Moscow, ID	W 35–25	9,000	
November 12	No. 8 Michigan State*	Multnomah Stadium; Portland, OR	W 25–20	22,239	
November 19	at Oregon	Hayward Field; Eugene, OR (Civil War)	W 20–10	23,000	
*Non-conference game; Rankings from AP Poll released prior to the game

== Roster ==
- HB Ken Carpenter, Sr.
