= Governors' Trophy Game =

American college football rivalry

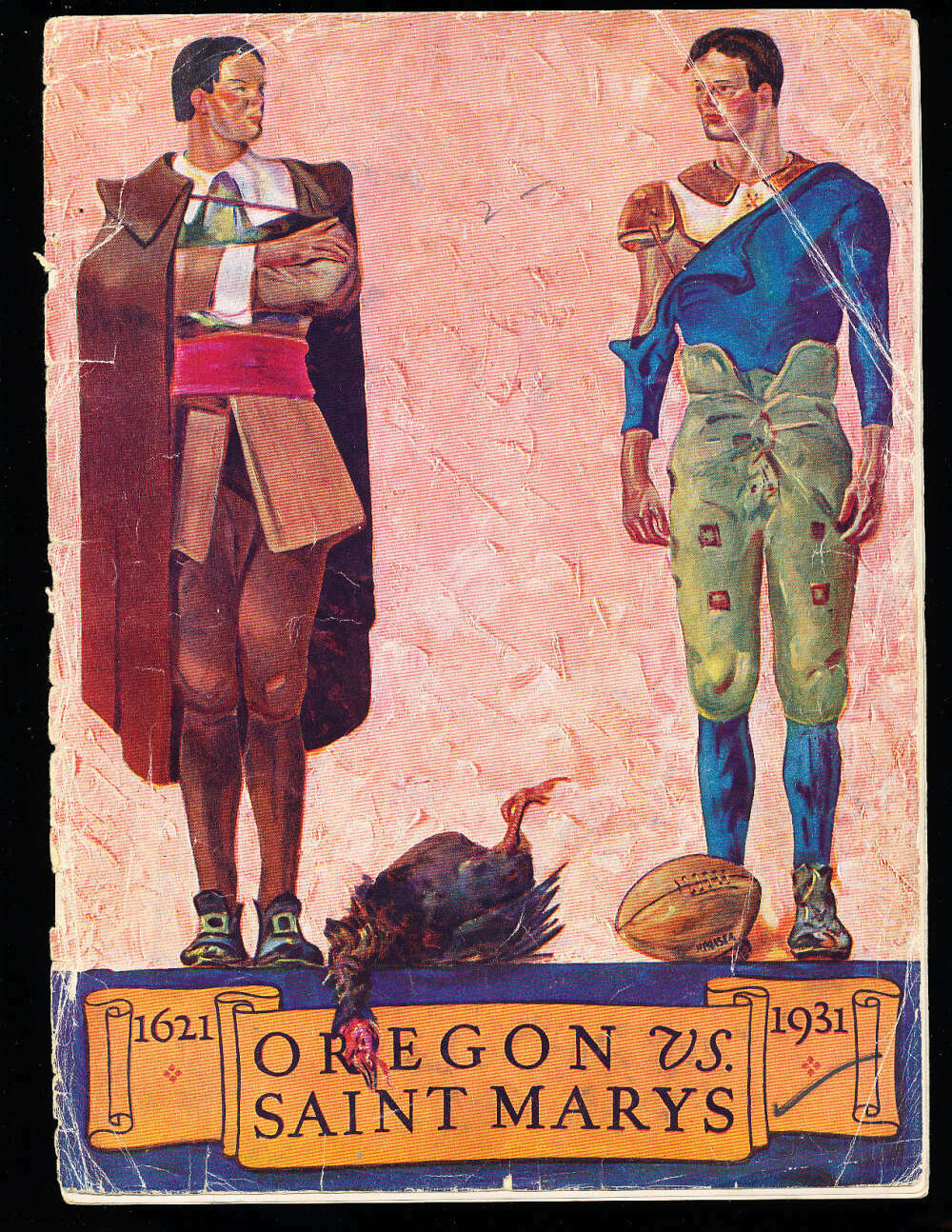
- Sport: College football
- Teams: Saint Mary's Gaels; Oregon Webfoots
- First meeting: November 28, 1929; Saint Mary's, 31–6
- Latest meeting: October 21, 1950; Saint Mary's, 18–13
- Stadiums: Kezar Stadium; Hayward Field
- Trophy: The Governors' Perpetual Trophy

Statistics
- Total meetings: 10
- All-time series: Saint Mary's leads, 7–3–0 (.700)
- Largest victory: Saint Mary's, 31–6 (1929)
- Longest win streak: Saint Mary's, 4 (1929–1932)

The Governors' Trophy Game was a college football rivalry game played between the University of Oregon and Saint Mary's College. The Webfoots and Gaels played an annual Thanksgiving Day classic from 1929 to 1935 in San Francisco's Kezar Stadium. Beginning in 1932 the teams played for The Governors' Perpetual Trophy, awarded to the victors jointly by the governors of the states of California and Oregon.

After a 12-year hiatus, and breaking from the Thanksgiving tradition, the teams met three more times from 1948 to 1950. The 1950 game would be the last time the rivalry was contested, as Saint Mary's College discontinued football in 1951 due to restrictions resulting from the Korean War.

== History ==
=== Thanksgiving Day classic ===
The Webfoots and Gaels met seven times on the gridiron between 1929 and 1935. The games were scheduled as an annual Thanksgiving Day classic, always held at Kezar Stadium in San Francisco's Golden Gate Park.

Their first meeting in 1929 was a crucial contest. Saint Mary's entered the game 7–0–1, having never been scored upon. Oregon was 7–1, with an invitation to the Rose Bowl on the line if they won the game. The Gaels prevailed but gave up their first and only points of the season.

In 1935 the game was played on Sunday, December 8, due to conflicting schedules. This was the first time the schools met on a day other than Thanksgiving.

=== The Governors' Perpetual Trophy ===
The rivalry gained a trophy in 1932 when The Governors' Perpetual Trophy was presented to Saint Mary's on the field following their 7–0 win. The trophy was awarded jointly by governors James Rolph of California and Julius Meier of Oregon. The trophy's inscription reads:

The Governors' Perpetual Trophy

Annual Football Game

University of Oregon and St. Mary's College

The trophy was again awarded upon the resumption of the series in 1948, this time by governors Earl Warren of California and Douglas McKay of Oregon.

=== Later years ===
After a 12-year hiatus, the schools resumed annual football competition in 1948. These games were not scheduled for Thanksgiving, and for the first time games were held at Hayward Field on the University of Oregon campus in Eugene. The states' governors continued to award the Perpetual Trophy to the winner of the Governors' Trophy Game.

The 1950 contest would prove to be the last time the rivalry was contested. Saint Mary's College discontinued the Gaels football and baseball teams in 1951 due to the national emergency sparked by the Korean War.

In their statement discontinuing the varsity football team, the Saint Mary's board of trustees thanked their athletic rivals for their longstanding competition: "The board is also gratefully mindful of the valued association maintained by St. Mary's college with other colleges and universities of long standing rivalry on the field of sport."

== Game results ==
Oregon victories	Saint Mary's victories

No.	Date	Location	Winner	Score
1	November 28, 1929	Kezar Stadium	Saint Mary's	31–6
2	November 27, 1930	Kezar Stadium	Saint Mary's	7–6
3	November 26, 1931	Kezar Stadium	Saint Mary's	16–0
4	November 24, 1932	Kezar Stadium	Saint Mary's	7–0
5	November 30, 1933	Kezar Stadium	Oregon	13–7
6	November 29, 1934	Kezar Stadium	Saint Mary's	13–7
7	December 7, 1935	Kezar Stadium	Saint Mary's	18–0
8	October 30, 1948	Hayward Field	Oregon	14–13
9	September 16, 1949	Kezar Stadium	Oregon	24–7
10	October 21, 1950	Hayward Field	Saint Mary's	18–13
Series: Saint Mary's leads 7–3

== See also ==
- List of NCAA college football rivalry games
- American football on Thanksgiving
