= 1949 Montana Grizzlies football team =

American college football season

1949 Montana Grizzlies football
- Conference: Pacific Coast Conference
- Record: 5–4 (0–3 PCC)
- Head coach: Ted Shipkey (1st season)
- Home stadium: Dornblaser Field

1949 Pacific Coast Conference football standings
	Conf.					Overall
Team	W		L		T	W		L		T
No. 3 California $	7	–	0	–	0	10	–	1	–	0
UCLA	5	–	2	–	0	6	–	3	–	0
Stanford	4	–	2	–	0	7	–	3	–	1
USC	4	–	2	–	0	5	–	3	–	1
Oregon State	5	–	3	–	0	7	–	3	–	0
Oregon	2	–	5	–	0	4	–	6	–	0
Washington	2	–	5	–	0	3	–	7	–	0
Washington State	2	–	6	–	0	3	–	6	–	0
Idaho	1	–	4	–	0	3	–	5	–	0
Montana	0	–	3	–	0	5	–	4	–	0
$ – Conference champion; Rankings from AP Poll

The 1949 Montana Grizzlies football team represented the University of Montana in the 1949 college football season as a member of the Pacific Coast Conference (PCC). The Grizzlies were led by first-year head coach Ted Shipkey, played their home games on campus at Dornblaser Field in Missoula and finished with a record of five wins and four losses (5–4, 0–3 PCC).

== Schedule ==
Date	Time	Opponent	Site	Result	Attendance	Source
September 17		vs. South Dakota*	Daylis Stadium; Billings, MT	W 33–13	4,500	
September 24		at Washington State	Rogers Field; Pullman, WA	L 7–13	7,000	
October 1		at Utah State*	Romney Stadium; Logan, UT	W 16–13	10,000	
October 7		at Colorado A&M*	Colorado Field; Fort Collins, CO	L 12–27	5,000	
October 15		at Oregon State	Bell Field; Corvallis, OR	L 14–63	8,000	
October 22		Idaho^{†}	Dornblaser Field; Missoula, MT (Little Brown Stein)	L 19–47	8,500	
October 29		vs. Montana State*	Naranche Stadium; Butte, MT (rivalry)	W 34–12		
November 5	2:00 p.m.	Eastern Washington*	Dornblaser Field; Missoula, MT (rivalry)	W 19–6		
November 19		BYU*	Dornblaser Field; Missoula, MT	W 25–6	3,500	
*Non-conference game; ^{†}Homecoming; All times are in Mountain time
