= 1949 UCLA Bruins football team =

American college football season

1949 UCLA Bruins football
- Conference: Pacific Coast Conference
- Record: 6–3 (5–2 PCC)
- Head coach: Red Sanders (1st season)
- Offensive scheme: Single-wing
- Home stadium: Los Angeles Memorial Coliseum

1949 Pacific Coast Conference football standings
	Conf.					Overall
Team	W		L		T	W		L		T
No. 3 California $	7	–	0	–	0	10	–	1	–	0
UCLA	5	–	2	–	0	6	–	3	–	0
Stanford	4	–	2	–	0	7	–	3	–	1
USC	4	–	2	–	0	5	–	3	–	1
Oregon State	5	–	3	–	0	7	–	3	–	0
Oregon	2	–	5	–	0	4	–	6	–	0
Washington	2	–	5	–	0	3	–	7	–	0
Washington State	2	–	6	–	0	3	–	6	–	0
Idaho	1	–	4	–	0	3	–	5	–	0
Montana	0	–	3	–	0	5	–	4	–	0
$ – Conference champion; Rankings from AP Poll

The 1949 UCLA Bruins football team was an American football team that represented the University of California, Los Angeles in the Pacific Coast Conference (PCC) during the 1949 college football season. In their first year under head coach Red Sanders, the Bruins compiled a 6–3 record (5–2 in PCC, second). Home games were played at the Los Angeles Memorial Coliseum.

Sanders was previously the head coach at Vanderbilt in the Southeastern Conference.

== Schedule ==
Date	Opponent	Rank	Site	Result	Attendance	Source
September 16	Oregon State		Los Angeles Memorial Coliseum; Los Angeles, CA	W 35–13	37,427	
September 24	at Iowa*		Iowa Stadium; Iowa City, IA	W 41–25	43,546	
September 30	Oregon		Los Angeles Memorial Coliseum; Los Angeles, CA	W 35–27	43,137	
October 8	at Stanford	No. 18	Stanford Stadium; Stanford, CA	W 14–7	40,000	
October 15	Santa Clara*	No. 13	Los Angeles Memorial Coliseum; Los Angeles, CA	L 0–14	28,911	
October 22	at Washington State		Rogers Field; Pullman, WA	W 27–20	21,000	
October 29	No. 4 California	No. 20	Los Angeles Memorial Coliseum; Los Angeles, CA (rivalry)	L 21–35	58,668	
November 12	Washington		Los Angeles Memorial Coliseum; Los Angeles, CA	W 47–26	26,420	
November 19	at USC		Los Angeles Memorial Coliseum; Los Angeles, CA (Victory Bell)	L 7–21	75,026	
*Non-conference game; Rankings from AP Poll released prior to the game; Source:

== Rankings ==
Ranking movements Legend: ██ Increase in ranking ██ Decrease in ranking — = Not ranked
	Week								
Poll	1	2	3	4	5	6	7	8	Final
AP	18	13	—	20	—	—	—	—	—
