= 1949 Washington Huskies football team =

American college football season

1949 Washington Huskies football
- Conference: Pacific Coast Conference
- Record: 3–7 (2–5 PCC)
- Head coach: Howie Odell (2nd season)
- Captain: Chuck Olson
- Home stadium: University of Washington Stadium

1949 Pacific Coast Conference football standings
	Conf.					Overall
Team	W		L		T	W		L		T
No. 3 California $	7	–	0	–	0	10	–	1	–	0
UCLA	5	–	2	–	0	6	–	3	–	0
Stanford	4	–	2	–	0	7	–	3	–	1
USC	4	–	2	–	0	5	–	3	–	1
Oregon State	5	–	3	–	0	7	–	3	–	0
Oregon	2	–	5	–	0	4	–	6	–	0
Washington	2	–	5	–	0	3	–	7	–	0
Washington State	2	–	6	–	0	3	–	6	–	0
Idaho	1	–	4	–	0	3	–	5	–	0
Montana	0	–	3	–	0	5	–	4	–	0
$ – Conference champion; Rankings from AP Poll

The 1949 Washington Huskies football team was an American football team that represented the University of Washington during the 1949 college football season. In its second season under head coach Howie Odell, the team compiled a 3–7 record, finished in a tie for sixth place in the Pacific Coast Conference, and was outscored by its opponents by a combined total of 285 to 167. Chuck Olson was the team captain.

== Schedule ==
Date	Opponent	Site	Result	Attendance	Source
September 17	Utah*	University of Washington Stadium; Seattle, WA	W 14–7	26,553	
September 24	at Minnesota*	Memorial Stadium; Minneapolis, MN	L 20–48	58,113	
October 1	Notre Dame*	University of Washington Stadium; Seattle, WA	L 7–27	41,500	
October 8	Oregon State	University of Washington Stadium; Seattle, WA	L 3–7	27,340	
October 15	Stanford	University of Washington Stadium; Seattle, WA	L 0–40	33,500	
October 22	at No. 5 California	California Memorial Stadium; Berkeley, CA	L 7–21	40,000	
October 29	No. 15 USC	University of Washington Stadium; Seattle, WA	L 28–40	33,500	
November 5	at Oregon	Multnomah Stadium; Portland, OR (rivalry)	W 28–27	32,600	
November 12	at UCLA	Los Angeles Memorial Coliseum; Los Angeles, CA	L 26–47	26,420	
November 19	Washington State	University of Washington Stadium; Seattle, WA (rivalry)	W 34–21	35,150	
*Non-conference game; Rankings from AP Poll released prior to the game; Source:

== NFL draft selections ==
Two University of Washington Huskies were selected in the 1950 NFL draft, which lasted 30 rounds with 391 selections.

= Husky Hall of Fame

Player	Position	Round	Pick	NFL club
George Bayer	Tackle	20	5	Washington Redskins
Chuck Olson	End	27	2	New York Yanks
