= 1930 Rose Bowl =

American college football game

- 16th Rose Bowl Game
USC Trojans	Pittsburgh Panthers
(9–2)	(9–0)
PCC	Independent
47	14
Head coach: Howard Jones	Head coach: Jock Sutherland
	1	2	3	4	Total
USC	13	13	14	7	47
Pittsburgh	0	0	7	7	14
- Date: January 1, 1930
- Season: 1929
- Stadium: Rose Bowl Stadium
- Location: Pasadena, California
- MVP: Russ Saunders (QB) – USC
- Attendance: 72,000

The 1930 Rose Bowl was the 16th Rose Bowl game, an American post-season college football game that was played on New Year's Day 1930 in Pasadena, California. It featured the Pittsburgh Panthers against the USC Trojans.

== Scoring ==
=== First Quarter ===
- USC – Edelson, 55-yard pass from Saunders (Shaver kick good)
- USC – Erny Pinckert, 25-yard pass from Saunders (Shaver kick blocked)

=== Second Quarter ===
- USC – Duffield, 1-yard run (Baker kick failed)
- USC – Duffield, 1-yard run (Baker kick good)

=== Third Quarter ===
- USC – Russ Saunders, 16-yard run (Shaver kick good)
- Pitt – Walinchus, 28-yard pass from Baker (Parkinson kick good)
- USC – Edelson, 39-yard pass from Saunders (Baker kick good)

=== Fourth Quarter ===
- Pitt – Collins, 36-yard pass from Williams (Parkinson kick good)
- USC – Wilcox, 57-yard pass from Duffield (Duffield dropkicked extra point)

== Game notes ==
By losing to the Trojans, the Panthers gave up the most points since 1903.
