= 1929 Arizona State–Flagstaff Lumberjacks football team =

American college football season

1929 Arizona State–Flagstaff Lumberjacks football
- Conference: Independent
- Record: 5–0
- Head coach: Rudy Lavik (3rd season)

1929 Western college football independents records
	Conf.			Overall
Team	W	L	T	W		L		T
Saint Mary's		–		8	–	0	–	1
Arizona		–		7	–	1	–	0
Loyola (CA)		–		6	–	3	–	0
Santa Clara		–		5	–	3	–	0
Gonzaga		–		4	–	3	–	0
Hawaii		–		4	–	3	–	0
New Mexico A&M		–		3	–	2	–	3
St. Ignatius (CA)		–		4	–	3	–	1
Santa Barbara State		–		4	–	4	–	1
New Mexico		–		2	–	4	–	2
Regis		–		3	–	7	–	0
Humboldt State		–		1	–	4	–	1
Arizona State		–		0	–	6	–	0
Columbia (OR)		–				–

The 1929 Arizona State–Flagstaff Lumberjacks football team was an American football team that represented Arizona State Teachers College at Flagstaff (now known as Northern Arizona University) as an independent during the 1929 college football season. In their third year under head coach Rudy Lavik, the Lumberjacks compiled a 5–0 record, shut out three of five opponents, and outscored all opponents by a total of 129 to 13.

== Schedule ==
Date	Opponent	Site	Result	Source
October 12	Loyola (CA)	Flagstaff, AZ	W 13–0	
October 19	Redlands	Flagstaff, AZ	W 32–7	
October 26	Arizona State^{†}	Flagstaff, AZ	W 31–0	
November 2	at New Mexico	Albuquerque, NM	W 25–6	
November 16	at Arizona State	Tempe, AZ	W 27–0	
^{†}Homecoming
