= 1929 Arizona State Bulldogs football team =

American college football season

1929 Arizona State Bulldogs football
- Conference: Independent
- Record: 0–6
- Head coach: Aaron McCreary (7th season)
- Home stadium: Irish Field

1929 Western college football independents records
	Conf.			Overall
Team	W	L	T	W		L		T
Saint Mary's		–		8	–	0	–	1
Arizona		–		7	–	1	–	0
Loyola (CA)		–		6	–	3	–	0
Santa Clara		–		5	–	3	–	0
Gonzaga		–		4	–	3	–	0
Hawaii		–		4	–	3	–	0
New Mexico A&M		–		3	–	2	–	3
St. Ignatius (CA)		–		4	–	3	–	1
Santa Barbara State		–		4	–	4	–	1
New Mexico		–		2	–	4	–	2
Regis		–		3	–	7	–	0
Humboldt State		–		1	–	4	–	1
Arizona State		–		0	–	6	–	0
Columbia (OR)		–				–

The 1929 Arizona State Bulldogs football team was an American football team that represented Arizona State Teachers College (later renamed Arizona State University) as an independent during the 1929 college football season. In their seventh and final season under head coach Aaron McCreary, the Bulldogs compiled a 0–6 record, were shut out in four of six games, and were outscored by all opponents by a combined total of 143 to 13. Dick Finley was the team captain.

== Schedule ==
Date	Opponent	Site	Result	Attendance	Source
October 5	at Texas Mines	El Paso High School Stadium; El Paso, TX	L 7–31		
October 19	Arizona freshmen	Irish Field; Tempe, AZ	L 0–7		
October 26	at Arizona State–Flagstaff	Skidmore Field; Flagstaff, AZ	L 0–31		
November 2	at Arizona	Arizona Stadium; Tucson, AZ (rivalry)	L 0–26		
November 16	Arizona State–Flagstaff	Irish Field; Tempe, AZ	L 0–27		
November 30	Loyola (CA)	Phoenix Union High School Stadium; Phoenix, AZ	L 6–21	<1,000	
