= 1929 Cal Aggies football team =

American college football season

1929 Cal Aggies football

Far Western champion
- Conference: Far Western Conference
- Record: 6–2 (5–0 FWC)
- Head coach: Crip Toomey (2nd season)
- Captain: Kermit Schmidt
- Home stadium: Sacramento Stadium

1929 Far Western Conference football standings
	Conf.					Overall
Team	W		L		T	W		L		T
Cal Aggies $	5	–	0	–	0	6	–	2	–	0
Nevada	2	–	1	–	0	2	–	5	–	1
San Jose State	2	–	1	–	1	3	–	3	–	1
Pacific (CA)	1	–	3	–	1	3	–	4	–	1
Chico State	1	–	3	–	0	3	–	5	–	0
Fresno State	1	–	4	–	0	1	–	7	–	0
$ – Conference champion

The 1929 Cal Aggies football team represented the Northern Branch of the College of Agriculture—now known as the University of California, Davis—as a member of the Far Western Conference (FWC) during the 1929 college football season. Led by second-year head coach Crip Toomey, the Aggies compiled an overall record of 6–2 with a mark of 5–0 in conference play, winning the FWC title. The team outscored its opponents 116 to 25 for the season with all six of their victories coming via shutout. The Cal Aggies played home games at Sacramento Stadium in Sacramento, California.

Kermit Schmidt, who played for the Cal Aggies from 1926 to 1929 and was the team's captain in 1929, later played in the National Football League (NFL) for the Boston Braves and Cincinnati Reds. Schmidt was the first Cal Aggie to play in the NFL. Following Schmidt, no other Aggie played in the NFL until Tom Williams in 1970.

== Schedule ==
Date	Time	Opponent	Site	Result	Attendance	Source
September 28		at Oregon State*	Bell Field; Corvallis, OR	L 0–19		
October 5	2:30 p.m.	BYU*	Sacramento Stadium; Sacramento, CA	W 19–0	5,000	
October 12		at San Jose State	Spartan Field; San Jose, CA	W 13–0		
October 19		at Pacific (CA)	Baxter Stadium; Stockton, CA	W 20–0		
October 26		at Nevada	Mackay Stadium (Note: This stadium is the predecessor to the current Mackay Stadium, which was opened for the 1966 season.); Reno, NV	W 19–0		
November 2		vs. Loyola (CA)	Rose Bowl; Pasadena, CA	L 0–6		
November 11	2:30 p.m.	Fresno State	Sacramento Stadium; Sacramento, CA	W 22–0	8,000	
November 28		at Chico State	unnamed field on campus; Chico, CA	W 23–0		
*Non-conference game; All times are in Pacific time
