= 1929 Cal Poly Mustangs football team =

American college football season

1929 Cal Poly Mustangs football
- Conference: California Coast Conference
- Record: 3–5 (0–2 CCC)
- Head coach: Al Agosti (9th season)

1929 California Coast Conference football standings
	Conf.					Overall
Team	W		L		T	W		L		T
Sacramento $	4	–	0	–	0	?	–	?	–	?
San Mateo	4	–	1	–	0	?	–	?	–	?
Menlo	4	–	1	–	0	?	–	?	–	?
Marin	3	–	2	–	0	?	–	?	–	?
Modesto	2	–	4	–	0	?	–	?	–	?
Cal Poly	0	–	2	–	0	3	–	5	–	0
Santa Rosa	0	–	3	–	0	?	–	?	–	?
Southern Oregon Normal	0	–	4	–	0	2	–	4	–	1
$ – Conference champion

The 1929 Cal Poly Mustangs football team represented California Polytechnic School—now known as California Polytechnic State University, San Luis Obispo—as a member of the California Coast Conference (CCC) during the 1929 college football season. Led by ninth-year head coach Al Agosti, Cal Poly compiled am overall record of 3–5 with a mark of 0–2 in conference play. The team was outscored by its opponents 146 to 130 for the season. The Mustangs played home games in San Luis Obispo, California.

Cal Poly was a two-year school until 1941. The Mustangs did not field a team in 1930 due to the polio epidemic.

== Schedule ==
Date	Opponent	Site	Result	Source
October 5	Moran Junior College (Note: Moran Junior College was founded in 1914 in Bainbridge Island, Washington. A satellite campus was opened in 1928 in Atascadero, California. Records show that the California site fielded football teams from 1929 to 1935. The Washington campus closed in 1935 and the California campus closed shortly thereafter.)*	San Luis Obispo, CA	W 70–6	
October 12	at Santa Rosa	Nevers Field; Santa Rosa, CA	W 19–7	
October 19	Taft*	San Luis Obispo, CA	W 21–0	
October 26	at Modesto	Modesto, CA	L 6–14	
November 2	Santa Barbara State*	San Luis Obispo, CA	L 0–7	
November 9	at San Mateo	San Mateo, CA	L 2–26	
November 16	Menlo	San Luis Obispo, CA	L 12–32	
November 22	at San Jose State*	Spartan Field; San Jose, CA	L 0–54	
*Non-conference game
