= 1929 Nevada Wolf Pack football team =

American college football season

1929 Nevada Wolf Pack football
- Conference: Far Western Conference
- Record: 2–5–1 (2–1 FWC)
- Head coach: George Philbrook (1st season)
- Home stadium: Mackay Field

1929 Far Western Conference football standings
	Conf.					Overall
Team	W		L		T	W		L		T
Cal Aggies $	5	–	0	–	0	6	–	2	–	0
Nevada	2	–	1	–	0	2	–	5	–	1
San Jose State	2	–	1	–	1	3	–	3	–	1
Pacific (CA)	1	–	3	–	1	3	–	4	–	1
Chico State	1	–	3	–	0	3	–	5	–	0
Fresno State	1	–	4	–	0	1	–	7	–	0
$ – Conference champion

The 1929 Nevada Wolf Pack football team was an American football team that represented the University of Nevada in the Far Western Conference (FWC) during the 1929 college football season. In their first season under head coach George Philbrook, the team compiled a 2–5–1 record (2–1 FWC) and finished second in the conference.

== Schedule ==
Date	Opponent	Site	Result	Attendance	Source
September 28	BYU*	Mackay Field; Reno, NV	L 7–10		
October 5	at Utah*	Ute Stadium; Salt Lake City, UT	L 0–31	6,700	
October 19	Fresno State	Mackay Field; Reno, NV	W 48–0		
October 26	Cal Aggies	Mackay Field; Reno, NV	L 0–19		
November 2	at Pacific (CA)	Baxter Stadium; Stockton, CA	W 8–0		
November 9	at USC*	Los Angeles Memorial Coliseum; Los Angeles, CA	L 0–66	20,000	
November 16	St. Ignatius (CA)*	Mackay Field; Reno, NV	T 0–0		
November 22	Saint Mary's*	Mackay Field; Reno, NV	L 0–54		
*Non-conference game
