= 1929 Chico State Wildcats football team =

American college football season

1929 Chico State Wildcats football
- Conference: Far Western Conference
- Record: 3–5 (1–3 FWC)
- Head coach: Art Acker (7th season)
- Home stadium: College Field

1929 Far Western Conference football standings
	Conf.					Overall
Team	W		L		T	W		L		T
Cal Aggies $	5	–	0	–	0	6	–	2	–	0
Nevada	2	–	1	–	0	2	–	5	–	1
San Jose State	2	–	1	–	1	3	–	3	–	1
Pacific (CA)	1	–	3	–	1	3	–	4	–	1
Chico State	1	–	3	–	0	3	–	5	–	0
Fresno State	1	–	4	–	0	1	–	7	–	0
$ – Conference champion

The 1929 Chico State Wildcats football team represented Chico State Teachers College—now known as California State University, Chico—as a member of the Far Western Conference (FWC) during the 1929 college football season. Led by seventh-year head coach Art Acker, Chico State compiled an overall record of 3–5 with a mark of 1–3 in conference play, tying for fourth place in the FWC. The team was outscored by its opponents 79 to 51 for the season. The Wildcats played home games at College Field in Chico, California.

== Schedule ==
Date	Opponent	Site	Result	Source
September 28	Humboldt State*	College Field; Chico, CA	W 19–0	
October 5	at Pacific (CA)	Baxter Stadium; Stockton, CA	L 6–12	
October 12	at Oregon Normal*	Multnomah Stadium; Portland, OR	L 0–12	
October 26	Fresno State	College Field; Chico, CA	W 12–0	
November 2	Sacramento*	College Field; Chico, CA	W 7–6	
November 11	San Jose State	College Field; Chico, CA	L 0–6	
November 15	at Southern Oregon Normal*	Walter E. Phillips Field?; Ashland, OR	L 7–20	
November 28	Cal Aggies	College Field; Chico, CA	L 0–23	
*Non-conference game
