= 1924 San Jose State Spartans football team =

American college football season

1924 San Jose State Spartans football
- Conference: California Coast Conference
- Record: 1–4 (0–1 CCC)
- Head coach: Ernesto R. Knollin (1st season)
- Home stadium: Spartan Field

1924 California Coast Conference football standings
	Conf.					Overall
Team	W		L		T	W		L		T
Chico State $	2	–	0	–	0	7	–	2	–	0
Fresno State	3	–	0	–	0	7	–	2	–	0
Modesto	2	–	1	–	0	3	–	4	–	1
San Mateo	1	–	1	–	0	?	–	?	–	?
Bakersfield	1	–	2	–	0	2	–	3	–	2
San Jose State	0	–	1	–	0	1	–	4	–	0
Sacramento	0	–	1	–	0	?	–	?	–	?
Cal Poly	0	–	3	–	0	1	–	5	–	0
$ – Conference champion

The 1924 San Jose State Spartans football team represented State Teachers College at San Jose (Note: San Jose State University was known as State Teachers College at San Jose from 1921 to 1934.) during the 1924 college football season.

San Jose State competed in the California Coast Conference (CCC). The team was led by first-year head coach Ernesto R. Knollin, and they played home games at Spartan Field in San Jose, California. The team finished the season with a record of one win and four losses (1–4, 0–1 CCC). The Spartans were outscored by their opponents 25–87 for the season.

== Schedule ==
Date	Opponent	Site	Result
October 4	San Benito*	Spartan Field; San Jose, CA	W 13–0
October 11	San Mateo*	Spartan Field; San Jose, CA	L 0–28
October 18	Modesto*	Spartan Field; San Jose, CA	L 6–26
October 25	at Santa Rosa*	Santa Rosa, CA	L 6–7
November 1	Chico State	Spartan Field; San Jose, CA	L 0–26
*Non-conference game
