= 1929 San Jose State Spartans football team =

American college football season

1929 San Jose State Spartans football
- Conference: Far Western Conference
- Record: 3–3–1 (2–1–1 FWC)
- Head coach: Mush Crawford (1st season)
- Home stadium: Spartan Field

1929 Far Western Conference football standings
	Conf.					Overall
Team	W		L		T	W		L		T
Cal Aggies $	5	–	0	–	0	6	–	2	–	0
Nevada	2	–	1	–	0	2	–	5	–	1
San Jose State	2	–	1	–	1	3	–	3	–	1
Pacific (CA)	1	–	3	–	1	3	–	4	–	1
Chico State	1	–	3	–	0	3	–	5	–	0
Fresno State	1	–	4	–	0	1	–	7	–	0
$ – Conference champion

The 1929 San Jose State Spartans football team represented State Teachers College at San Jose (Note: San Jose State University was known as State Teachers College at San Jose from 1921 to 1934.) during the 1929 college football season.

San Jose State competed in the Far Western Conference (FWC) (Note: The Northern California Athletic Conference (NCAC) was known as the Far Western Conference (FWC) from its founding in 1925 to 1982.) for the first time in 1929. They had previously been a member of the California Coast Conference (CCC) from 1922 to 1928. The team was led by first-year head coach Mush Crawford, and they played home games at Spartan Field in San Jose, California. The team finished the season with a record of three wins, three losses and one tie (3–3–1, 2–1–1 FWC). The Spartans outscored their opponents 104–78 for the season.

== Schedule ==
Date	Opponent	Site	Result	Source
October 12	Cal Aggies	Spartan Field; San Jose, CA	L 0–13	
October 19	at Sacramento*	Sacramento, CA	L 6–20	
October 26	Pacific (CA)	Spartan Field; San Jose, CA (rivalry)	T 6–6	
November 2	at Stanford JV*	Stanford, CA	L 6–25	
November 11	at Chico State	College Field; Chico, CA	W 6–0	
November 16	at Fresno State	Fresno State College Stadium; Fresno, CA (rivalry)	W 26–14	
November 22	Cal Poly*	Spartan Field; San Jose, CA	W 54–0	
*Non-conference game
