= 1929 New Mexico A&M Aggies football team =

American college football season

1929 New Mexico A&M Aggies football
- Conference: Independent
- Record: 3–2–3
- Head coach: Jerry Hines (1st season)
- Home stadium: Miller Field

1929 Western college football independents records
	Conf.			Overall
Team	W	L	T	W		L		T
Saint Mary's		–		8	–	0	–	1
Arizona		–		7	–	1	–	0
Loyola (CA)		–		6	–	3	–	0
Santa Clara		–		5	–	3	–	0
Gonzaga		–		4	–	3	–	0
Hawaii		–		4	–	3	–	0
New Mexico A&M		–		3	–	2	–	3
St. Ignatius (CA)		–		4	–	3	–	1
Santa Barbara State		–		4	–	4	–	1
New Mexico		–		2	–	4	–	2
Regis		–		3	–	7	–	0
Humboldt State		–		1	–	4	–	1
Arizona State		–		0	–	6	–	0
Columbia (OR)		–				–

The 1929 New Mexico A&M Aggies football team was an American football team that represented New Mexico College of Agriculture and Mechanical Arts (now known as New Mexico State University) during the 1929 college football season. In their first year under head coach Jerry Hines, the Aggies compiled a 3–2–3 record and shut out three opponents. The team played home games on Miller Field, sometimes also referred to as College Field.

== Schedule ==
Date	Opponent	Site	Result	Attendance	Source
September 28	Gila Junior College	Las Cruces, NM	W 60–0		
October 12	Sul Ross	Las Cruces, NM	W 6–0		
October 18	Montezuma College	Las Cruces, NM	T 0–0		
October 26	at Arizona	Arizona Stadium; Tucson, AZ	L 0–28	2,500	
November 1	New Mexico Mines	Las Cruces, NM	W 52–7		
November 9	at Texas Mines	El Paso High School Stadium; El Paso, TX (rivalry)	L 0–8	1,700	
November 16	New Mexico^{†}	Las Cruces, NM (rivalry)	T 7–7		
November 21	New Mexico Military	Las Cruces, NM	T 7–7		
^{†}Homecoming
