= 1929 Pacific Tigers football team =

American college football season

1929 Pacific Tigers football
- Conference: Far Western Conference
- Record: 3–4–1 (1–3–1 FWC)
- Head coach: Erwin Righter (9th season)
- Home stadium: Baxter Stadium

1929 Far Western Conference football standings
	Conf.					Overall
Team	W		L		T	W		L		T
Cal Aggies $	5	–	0	–	0	6	–	2	–	0
Nevada	2	–	1	–	0	2	–	5	–	1
San Jose State	2	–	1	–	1	3	–	3	–	1
Pacific (CA)	1	–	3	–	1	3	–	4	–	1
Chico State	1	–	3	–	0	3	–	5	–	0
Fresno State	1	–	4	–	0	1	–	7	–	0
$ – Conference champion

The 1929 Pacific Tigers football team represented the College of the Pacific—now known as the University of the Pacific—in Stockton, California as a member of the Far Western Conference (FWC) during the 1929 college football season. The team was led by ninth-year head coach Erwin Righter, and played home games at Baxter Stadium in Stockton. Pacific compiled an overall record of 3–4–1 with a mark of 1–3–1 in conference play, tying for fourth place in the FWC. The Tigers were outscored by their opponents 88 to 67 for the season.

== Schedule ==
Date	Time	Opponent	Site	Result	Source
September 28		Modesto*	Baxter Stadium; Stockton, CA	W 20–0	
October 5		Chico State	Baxter Stadium; Stockton, CA	W 12–6	
October 12	2:30 p.m.	at Sacramento*	Sacramento Stadium; Sacramento, CA	L 7–21	
October 19		Cal Aggies	Baxter Stadium; Stockton, CA	L 0–20	
October 26		at San Jose State	Spartan Field; San Jose, CA (rivalry)	T 6–6	
November 2		Nevada^{†}	Baxter Stadium; Stockton, CA	L 0–8	
November 11		Loyola (CA)*	Baxter Stadium; Stockton, CA	W 16–7	
November 28		at Fresno State	Fresno State College Stadium; Fresno, CA	L 6–20	
*Non-conference game; ^{†}Homecoming; All times are in Pacific time
