= 1924 Saint Mary's Saints football team =

American college football season

1924 Saint Mary's Saints football
- Conference: Independent
- Record: 8–1
- Head coach: Slip Madigan (4th season)
- Home stadium: Ewing Field

1924 Western college football independents records
	Conf.			Overall
Team	W	L	T	W		L		T
Hawaii		–		8	–	0	–	0
Saint Mary's		–		8	–	1	–	0
La Verne		–		7	–	1	–	1
Tempe Normal		–		7	–	1	–	1
New Mexico A&M		–		7	–	3	–	0
Pacific (CA)		–		6	–	3	–	0
New Mexico		–		5	–	1	–	0
Cal Aggies		–		5	–	4	–	1
Nevada		–		3	–	4	–	1
Santa Clara		–		3	–	5	–	1
Arizona		–		2	–	4	–	0
Santa Barbara		–		2	–	5	–	1
Humboldt State		–		1	–	0	–	0

The 1924 Saint Mary's Saints football team was an American football team that represented Saint Mary's College of California during the 1924 college football season. In their fourth season under head coach Slip Madigan, the Gaels compiled an 8–1 record and outscored their opponents by a combined total of 205 to 50. The Gaels' victories including a 14–10 besting of the USC Trojans, and the sole defeat was by a 17–7 score against a California team that had been undefeated for more than four years with four national championships.

The 1924 St. Mary's team included halfbacks "Ducky" Grant and Leo Rooney, fullback and team captain Red Strader, and center Larry Bettencourt.

== Schedule ==
Date	Opponent	Site	Result	Attendance	Source
September 28	Mare Island Sailors	Ewing Field; San Francisco, CA	W 46–0		
October 4	at California	California Memorial Stadium; Berkeley, CA	L 7–17		
October 12	vs. Agnetian Club	Ewing Field; San Francisco, CA	W 7–3		
October 26	vs. Olympic Club	Ewing Field; San Francisco, CA	W 20–7		
November 1	at Multnomah Athletic Club	Multnomah Field; Portland, OR	W 14–0		
November 8	at USC	Los Angeles Memorial Coliseum; Los Angeles, CA	W 14–10		
November 15	Cal Aggies	Ewing Field; San Francisco, CA	W 42–6		
November 22	at Nevada	Mackay Field; Reno, NV	W 27–0		
November 27	vs. Santa Clara	Ewing Field; San Francisco, CA	W 28–7	18,000	
