= 1929 Loyola Lions football team =

American college football season

1929 Loyola Lions football
- Conference: Independent
- Record: 6–3
- Head coach: William L. Driver (1st season)
- Home stadium: Wrigley Field

1929 Western college football independents records
	Conf.			Overall
Team	W	L	T	W		L		T
Saint Mary's		–		8	–	0	–	1
Arizona		–		7	–	1	–	0
Loyola (CA)		–		6	–	3	–	0
Santa Clara		–		5	–	3	–	0
Gonzaga		–		4	–	3	–	0
Hawaii		–		4	–	3	–	0
New Mexico A&M		–		3	–	2	–	3
St. Ignatius (CA)		–		4	–	3	–	1
Santa Barbara State		–		4	–	4	–	1
New Mexico		–		2	–	4	–	2
Regis		–		3	–	7	–	0
Humboldt State		–		1	–	4	–	1
Arizona State		–		0	–	6	–	0
Columbia (OR)		–				–

The 1929 Loyola Lions football team was an American football team that represented Loyola College of Los Angeles (now known as Loyola Marymount University) as an independent during the 1929 college football season. In their first and only season under head coach William L. Driver, the Lions compiled a 6–3 record.

== Schedule ==
Date	Opponent	Site	Result	Attendance	Source
September 21	vs. USS Colorado	Santa Monica High School; Santa Monica, CA	W 20–0		
September 28	at Fresno State	Fresno State College Stadium; Fresno, CA	W 20–0		
October 12	at Arizona State–Flagstaff	Flagstaff, AZ	L 0–13		
October 19	Los Angeles Firemen	Wrigley Field; Los Angeles, CA	W 20–13		
October 27	at San Diego NTS	San Diego, CA	W 37–0		
November 2	vs. Cal Aggies	Rose Bowl; Pasadena, CA	W 6–0		
November 11	at Pacific (CA)	Baxter Stadium; Stockton, CA (Armistice Day)	L 7–16		
November 28	Santa Clara	Wrigley Field; Los Angeles, CA	L 0–37		
November 30	at Arizona State	Phoenix Union High School Stadium; Phoenix, AZ	W 21–6	< 1,000	
