= 1924 Santa Clara Broncos football team =

American college football season

1924 Santa Clara Broncos football
- Conference: Independent
- Record: 3–5–1
- Head coach: Eddie Kienholz (2nd season)
- Home stadium: Mission Field, Ewing Field

1924 Western college football independents records
	Conf.			Overall
Team	W	L	T	W		L		T
Hawaii		–		8	–	0	–	0
Saint Mary's		–		8	–	1	–	0
La Verne		–		7	–	1	–	1
Tempe Normal		–		7	–	1	–	1
New Mexico A&M		–		7	–	3	–	0
Pacific (CA)		–		6	–	3	–	0
New Mexico		–		5	–	1	–	0
Cal Aggies		–		5	–	4	–	1
Nevada		–		3	–	4	–	1
Santa Clara		–		3	–	5	–	1
Arizona		–		2	–	4	–	0
Santa Barbara		–		2	–	5	–	1
Humboldt State		–		1	–	0	–	0

The 1924 Santa Clara Broncos football team was an American football team that represented Santa Clara University as an independent during the 1924 college football season. In their second and final season under head coach Eddie Kienholz, the Broncos compiled a 3–5–1 record and were outscored by opponents by a total of 96 to 58.

== Schedule ==
Date	Opponent	Site	Result	Attendance	Source
September 9	vs. Agnetian Club	Ewing Field; San Francisco, CA	L 0–6	6,000	
September 20	USS California	Mission Field; Santa Clara, CA	W 20–0		
September 27	at California	California Memorial Stadium; Berkeley, CA	L 7–13	18,000	
October 18	at Occidental	Los Angeles Memorial Coliseum; Los Angeles, CA	W 12–0	20,000	
October 25	Cal Aggies	Mission Field; Santa Clara, CA	W 6–0		
October 31	at Stanford	Stanford Stadium; Stanford, CA	L 0–20		
November 8	Nevada	Ewing Field; San Francisco, CA	T 6–6		
November 16	vs. Olympic Club	Ewing Field; San Francisco, CA	L 0–13		
November 27	vs. Saint Mary's	Ewing Field; San Francisco, CA	L 7–28	18,000	
