= Ernesto R. Knollin =

American football, baseball and soccer coach (1888–1981)

- Knollin in 1927

Biographical details
- Born: May 23, 1888; Sandy Creek, New York, U.S.
- Died: June 7, 1981 (aged 93); Dallas, Texas, U.S.
- Education: Stanford University (BA, MA)

Coaching career (HC unless noted)

Football
- 1924–1928: San Jose State

Baseball
- 1925–1928: San Jose State

Soccer
- 1918: Stanford

Head coaching record
- Overall: 14–22–2 (football); 27–14–1 (baseball); 0–2 (soccer)

Accomplishments and honors

Championships
- Football; 1 CCC (1928)

Ernesto Ray Knollin (May 23, 1888 – June 7, 1981) was an American college sports coach and a physical education professor. He served as the head coach for both San Jose State's American football program from 1924 to 1928 and baseball program from 1925 to 1928. Additionally, he also served as head coach at Stanford's soccer program in 1918. Knollin then taught physical education at the University of Oregon from 1929 to 1966.

== Early life and education ==
Knollin was born in Sandy Creek, New York and raised in Auburn, New York, to parents Edward M. Knollin: a machinist and inventor and Clara Sadler. Knollin had two sisters, Mattie and Luella, and an older brother named Herbert.

Knollin had a variety of jobs growing up. Among those included working at The Auburn Citizen selling newspapers and pasting clippings, and on a ranch in Skaneateles, New York. He also worked as a tailor, a shoemaker, a lawnmower, and a doctor's assistant.

On December 26, 1908, Knollin moved to California to, later, enroll at Stanford University. Knollin then graduated with a Bachelor of Arts degree from Stanford in 1914. Knollin was a brother of both the Phi Delta Kappa and Phi Delta Epsilon fraternities. Upon graduation, Knollin became both an instructor and acting director for the university's Department of Physical Education. Knollin held both positions until being enlisted in the U.S. military during World War I.

== Career ==
After World War I, Knollin resumed to his normal life by being the head soccer coach at Stanford in 1918, tallying a mark of 0–2.

Knollin also resumed to being a physical education instructor at the University of Illinois from 1921 to 1923, and then becoming a Department of Physical Education chair at Lowell High School in San Francisco.

Knollin served as the head football coach at San Jose State University, from 1924 to 1928, compiling a record of 14–22–2. Knollin was also the head baseball coach at San Jose State, from 1925 to 1928, amassing a record of 27–14–1.

After his last year as a coach, Knollin went back to Stanford to then receive a Master of Arts degree in 1929. At the same year, he then became a physical education professor the University of Oregon, where he became a professor emeritus of physical education until his retirement 1966.

== Personal life and death ==
Knollin married to Norwegian-American physical education instructor Edith Ueland in 1922. The couple had one son named Bobray, and have lived in Dallas after Knollin's retirement until his death on June 7, 1981.

== Head coaching record ==
=== Football ===
Year	Team	Overall	Conference	Standing	Bowl/playoffs
San Jose State Spartans (California Coast Conference) (1924–1928)
1924	San Jose State	1–4	0–1	T–6th	
1925	San Jose State	2–5	2–4		
1926	San Jose State	1–6–1	0–5–1	6th	
1927	San Jose State	4–5	3–3		
1928	San Jose State	6–2–1	6–2	T–1st	
San Jose State:		14–22–2	11–15–1		
Total:		14–22–2			
National championship Conference title Conference division title or championship game berth
