= 1929 Fresno State Bulldogs football team =

American college football season

1929 Fresno State Bulldogs football
- Conference: Far Western Conference
- Record: 1–7 (1–4 FWC)
- Head coach: Stanley Borleske (1st season)
- Home stadium: Fresno State College Stadium

1929 Far Western Conference football standings
	Conf.					Overall
Team	W		L		T	W		L		T
Cal Aggies $	5	–	0	–	0	6	–	2	–	0
Nevada	2	–	1	–	0	2	–	5	–	1
San Jose State	2	–	1	–	1	3	–	3	–	1
Pacific (CA)	1	–	3	–	1	3	–	4	–	1
Chico State	1	–	3	–	0	3	–	5	–	0
Fresno State	1	–	4	–	0	1	–	7	–	0
$ – Conference champion

The 1929 Fresno State Bulldogs football team represented Fresno State Normal School—now known as California State University, Fresno—during the 1929 college football season.

Fresno State competed in the Far Western Conference (FWC). (Note: The Northern California Athletic Conference (NCAC) was known as the Far Western Conference (FWC) from its founding in 1925 to 1982.) The 1929 team was led by first-year head coach Stanley Borleske and played home games at Fresno State College Stadium (Note: Ratcliffe Stadium was known as Fresno State College Stadium from 1926 to 1940.) on the campus of Fresno City College in Fresno, California. They finished with a record of one win and seven losses (1–7, 1–4 FWC). The Bulldogs were outscored by their opponents 40–250 for the season and were shut out in six of the eight games.

== Schedule ==
Date	Time	Opponent	Site	Result	Attendance	Source
September 28		Loyola (CA)*	Fresno State College Stadium; Fresno, CA	L 0–20		
October 5		at UCLA*	UCLA Athletic Field; Westwood, CA	L 6–56		
October 12		Olympic Club*	Fresno State College Stadium; Fresno, CA	L 0–60		
October 19		at Nevada	Mackay Stadium (Note: This stadium is the predecessor to the current Mackay Stadium, which was opened for the 1966 season.); Reno, NV	L 0–48		
October 26		at Chico State	College Field; Chico, CA	L 0–12		
November 11	2:30 p.m.	at Cal Aggies	Sacramento Stadium; Sacramento, CA	L 0–22	8,000	
November 16		San Jose State	Fresno State College Stadium; Fresno, CA (rivalry)	L 14–26		
November 28		Pacific (CA)	Fresno State College Stadium; Fresno, CA	W 20–6		
*Non-conference game; All times are in Pacific time
