= 1924 Cal Aggies football team =

American college football season

1924 Cal Aggies football
- Conference: Independent
- Record: 5–4–1
- Head coach: William L. Driver (2nd season)
- Captain: Herb Spilman

1924 Western college football independents records
	Conf.			Overall
Team	W	L	T	W		L		T
Hawaii		–		8	–	0	–	0
Saint Mary's		–		8	–	1	–	0
La Verne		–		7	–	1	–	1
Tempe Normal		–		7	–	1	–	1
New Mexico A&M		–		7	–	3	–	0
Pacific (CA)		–		6	–	3	–	0
New Mexico		–		5	–	1	–	0
Cal Aggies		–		5	–	4	–	1
Nevada		–		3	–	4	–	1
Santa Clara		–		3	–	5	–	1
Arizona		–		2	–	4	–	0
Santa Barbara		–		2	–	5	–	1
Humboldt State		–		1	–	0	–	0

The 1924 Cal Aggies football team represented the Northern Branch of the College of Agriculture—now known as the University of California, Davis—as an independent during the 1924 college football season. The team was known as the Cal Aggies or California Aggies. Led by second-year head coach William L. Driver, the Cal Aggies compiled a record of 5–4–1 and outscored their opponents 124 to 104 for the season. The Cal Aggies played home games in Davis, California.

== Schedule ==
Date	Opponent	Site	Result	Source
September 20	Mare Island Naval Hospital Training School	Davis, CA	W 34–7	
September 27	St. Ignatius (CA)	Davis, CA	W 16–6	
October 4	Olympic Club	Davis, CA	T 0–0	
October 18	Chico State	Davis, CA	W 23–0	
October 25	at Santa Clara	Mission Field; Santa Clara, CA	L 0–6	
November 1	at Pacific (CA)	C.O.P. Field (Note: The November 1, 1924 meeting between Pacific and the Cal Aggies was the first game ever played at C.O.P. Field); Stockton, CA	L 14–17	
November 11	Woodland American Legion	Beamer Park; Woodland, CA	W 12–7	
November 15	at Saint Mary's	Ewing Field; San Francisco, CA	L 6–42	
November 27	at Arizona	Tucson, AZ	L 6–12	
November 29	Pasadena Athletic Club	Tournament Park; Pasadena, CA	W 13–7	
