= 1929 New Mexico Lobos football team =

American college football season

1929 New Mexico Lobos football
- Conference: Independent
- Record: 2–4–2
- Head coach: Roy W. Johnson (10th season)
- Captains: Jack Fish; James D. Wilson
- Home stadium: University Field

1929 Western college football independents records
	Conf.			Overall
Team	W	L	T	W		L		T
Saint Mary's		–		8	–	0	–	1
Arizona		–		7	–	1	–	0
Loyola (CA)		–		6	–	3	–	0
Santa Clara		–		5	–	3	–	0
Gonzaga		–		4	–	3	–	0
Hawaii		–		4	–	3	–	0
New Mexico A&M		–		3	–	2	–	3
St. Ignatius (CA)		–		4	–	3	–	1
Santa Barbara State		–		4	–	4	–	1
New Mexico		–		2	–	4	–	2
Regis		–		3	–	7	–	0
Humboldt State		–		1	–	4	–	1
Arizona State		–		0	–	6	–	0
Columbia (OR)		–				–

The 1929 New Mexico Lobos football team represented the University of New Mexico as an independent during the 1929 college football season. In their 10th season under head coach Roy W. Johnson, the Lobos compiled a 2–4–2 record. Jack Fish and James D. Wilson were the team captains.

== Schedule ==
Date	Opponent	Site	Result	Attendance	Source
October 2	New Mexico Mines	University Field; Albuquerque, NM	W 46–0		
October 11	at Occidental	Rose Bowl; Pasadena, CA	L 0–26		
October 19	at New Mexico Military	Roswell, NM	L 20–28		
November 2	Arizona State–Flagstaff	University Field; Albuquerque, NM	L 6–26		
November 9	Montezuma College	University Field; Albuquerque, NM	W 47–0		
November 16	at New Mexico A&M	Las Cruces, NM (rivalry)	T 7–7	3,000	
November 23	Arizona^{†}	University Field; Albuquerque, NM (rivalry)	L 0–6	3,000	
November 28	Lombard	University Field; Albuquerque, NM	T 7–7	5,000	
^{†}Homecoming
