= 1924 New Mexico A&M Aggies football team =

American college football season

1924 New Mexico A&M Aggies football
- Conference: Independent
- Record: 7–3
- Head coach: R. R. Brown (2nd season)
- Home stadium: Miller Field

1924 Western college football independents records
	Conf.			Overall
Team	W	L	T	W		L		T
Hawaii		–		8	–	0	–	0
Saint Mary's		–		8	–	1	–	0
La Verne		–		7	–	1	–	1
Tempe Normal		–		7	–	1	–	1
New Mexico A&M		–		7	–	3	–	0
Pacific (CA)		–		6	–	3	–	0
New Mexico		–		5	–	1	–	0
Cal Aggies		–		5	–	4	–	1
Nevada		–		3	–	4	–	1
Santa Clara		–		3	–	5	–	1
Arizona		–		2	–	4	–	0
Santa Barbara		–		2	–	5	–	1
Humboldt State		–		1	–	0	–	0

The 1924 New Mexico A&M Aggies football team was an American football team that represented New Mexico College of Agriculture and Mechanical Arts (now known as New Mexico State University) during the 1924 college football season. In their second year under head coach R. R. Brown, the Aggies compiled a 7–3 record and shut out five opponents. The team played home games on Miller Field, sometimes also referred to as College Field.

== Schedule ==
Date	Opponent	Site	Result	Source
	Las Cruces High School	Las Cruces, NM	L 6–7	
September 26	Beaumont Army Hospital	Las Cruces NM	W 45–7	
October 4	El Paso High School	Las Cruces NM	W 33–2	
October 11	El Paso Junior College	Las Cruces NM	W 36–0	
October 18	El Paso Garden Grocers	Las Cruces NM	W 7–0	
October 25	at Arizona	Tucson, AZ	L 0–7	
November 1	Montezuma College	Las Cruces NM	W 89–0	
November 8	at Texas Mines	El Paso, TX (rivalry)	W 19–0	
November 15	New Mexico	Las Cruces NM (rivalry)	W 6–0	
November 27	at New Mexico Military	Roswell, NM	L 0–7	
