= 1924 Nevada Wolf Pack football team =

American college football season

1924 Nevada Wolf Pack football
- Conference: Independent
- Record: 3–4–1
- Head coach: Charles F. Erb (1st season)
- Home stadium: Mackay Field

1924 Western college football independents records
	Conf.			Overall
Team	W	L	T	W		L		T
Hawaii		–		8	–	0	–	0
Saint Mary's		–		8	–	1	–	0
La Verne		–		7	–	1	–	1
Tempe Normal		–		7	–	1	–	1
New Mexico A&M		–		7	–	3	–	0
Pacific (CA)		–		6	–	3	–	0
New Mexico		–		5	–	1	–	0
Cal Aggies		–		5	–	4	–	1
Nevada		–		3	–	4	–	1
Santa Clara		–		3	–	5	–	1
Arizona		–		2	–	4	–	0
Santa Barbara		–		2	–	5	–	1
Humboldt State		–		1	–	0	–	0

The 1924 Nevada Wolf Pack football team was an American football team that represented the University of Nevada as an independent during the 1924 college football season. In their first and only season under head coach Charles F. Erb, the team compiled a 3–4–1 record.

Erb was hired as the team's head coach in late April 1924. He was captain of the 1921 California Golden Bears football team. Erb resigned as Nevada's head coach on January 9, 1925.

Bill Gutteron played quarterback for the Wolf Pack from 1923 to 1925. He later played quarterback in the National Football League (NFL) for the Los Angeles Buccaneers.

== Schedule ==
Date	Opponent	Site	Result	Attendance	Source
October 11	Fresno State	Mackay Field; Reno, NV	W 16–0		
October 18	Pacific (CA)	Mackay Field; Reno, NV	W 48–6		
October 25	at USC	Los Angeles Memorial Coliseum; Los Angeles, CA	L 7–21	20,000	
November 1	Arizona	Mackay Field; Reno, NV	W 23–14		
November 8	at Santa Clara	Ewing Field; San Francisco, CA	T 6–6		
November 15	at California	California Memorial Stadium; Berkeley, CA	L 0–27		
November 22	Saint Mary's	Mackay Field; Reno, NV	L 0–27		
November 27	vs. Idaho	Public School Field; Boise, ID	L 0–23		
