= 1924 Pacific Tigers football team =

American college football season

1924 Pacific Tigers football
- Conference: Independent
- Record: 6–3
- Head coach: Erwin Righter (4th season)
- Home stadium: College of the Pacific Field

1924 Western college football independents records
	Conf.			Overall
Team	W	L	T	W		L		T
Hawaii		–		8	–	0	–	0
Saint Mary's		–		8	–	1	–	0
La Verne		–		7	–	1	–	1
Tempe Normal		–		7	–	1	–	1
New Mexico A&M		–		7	–	3	–	0
Pacific (CA)		–		6	–	3	–	0
New Mexico		–		5	–	1	–	0
Cal Aggies		–		5	–	4	–	1
Nevada		–		3	–	4	–	1
Santa Clara		–		3	–	5	–	1
Arizona		–		2	–	4	–	0
Santa Barbara		–		2	–	5	–	1
Humboldt State		–		1	–	0	–	0

The 1924 Pacific Tigers football team represented the College of the Pacific—now known as the University of the Pacific—in Stockton, California as an independent during the 1924 college football season. They had been a member of the California Coast Conference (CCC) from 1922 to 1923 and became a charter member of the Far Western Conference (FWC) in 1925. The team was led by fourth-year head coach Erwin Righter and played home games at a field on campus in Stockton. Pacific finished with a record of 6–3 and outscored their opponents 152 to 115 for the season.

== Schedule ==
Date	Opponent	Site	Result
October 11	at Sacramento	Sacramento, CA	W 39–0
October 18	at Nevada	Mackay Stadium (Note: This stadium is the predecessor to the current Mackay Stadium, which was opened for the 1966 season.); Reno, NV	L 6–48
October 25	at Chico State	College Field; Chico, CA	W 7–0
November 1	Cal Aggies^{†}	College of the Pacific Field; Stockton, CA	W 17–14
November 8	St. Ignatius	College of the Pacific Field; Stockton, CA	W 27–13
November 11	West Coast Army (CA)	College of the Pacific Field; Stockton, CA	W 28–7
November 15	Modesto	College of the Pacific Field; Stockton, CA	W 21–0
November 22	Fresno State	College of the Pacific Field; Stockton, CA	L 0–12
November 27	Whittier	College of the Pacific Field; Stockton, CA	L 7–21
^{†}Homecoming
