= 1924 Hawaii Deans football team =

American college football season

1924 Hawaii Deans football
- Conference: Independent
- Record: 8–0
- Head coach: Otto Klum (4th season)
- Home stadium: Moiliili Field

1924 Western college football independents records
	Conf.			Overall
Team	W	L	T	W		L		T
Hawaii		–		8	–	0	–	0
Saint Mary's		–		8	–	1	–	0
La Verne		–		7	–	1	–	1
Tempe Normal		–		7	–	1	–	1
New Mexico A&M		–		7	–	3	–	0
Pacific (CA)		–		6	–	3	–	0
New Mexico		–		5	–	1	–	0
Cal Aggies		–		5	–	4	–	1
Nevada		–		3	–	4	–	1
Santa Clara		–		3	–	5	–	1
Arizona		–		2	–	4	–	0
Santa Barbara		–		2	–	5	–	1
Humboldt State		–		1	–	0	–	0

The 1924 Hawaii Deans football team was an American football team that represented the University of Hawaii as an independent during the 1924 college football season. In its fourth season under head coach Otto Klum, the team compiled a perfect 8–0 record, shut out five of eight opponents, and outscored opponents by a total of 185 to 12. On January 1, 1925, the Deans defeated the Rocky Mountain Conference champion 1924 Colorado Silver and Gold football team by a 13 to 0 score.

The season was part of a 20-game winning streak by Hawaii that began with a January 1, 1924, victory over the 1923 Oregon Agricultural Aggies football team and ended on October 2, 1926, with a victory over a United States Army field artillery unit. The undefeated 1924 and 1925 Hawaii teams are known as the "Wonder Teams". Over the course of 18 games during the 1924 and 1925 seasons, the Wonder Teams outscored opponents by a total of 606 to 29. The 1924 and 1925 teams were inducted as a group into the University of Hawaii Circle of Honor in 1955.

Key players on the 1924 and 1925 Wonder Teams included Bill "Doggie" Wise, Johnny Morse, Eddie Fernandez, and Theodore "Pump" Searle, sometimes referred to as the Four Horsemen of Mānoa".

== Schedule ==
Date	Opponent	Site	Result	Attendance	Source
October 4	13th Field Artillery	Moiliili Field; Honolulu, Territory of Hawaii	W 41–0		
October 11	Honolulu Town Team	Moiliili Field; Honolulu, Territory of Hawaii	W 21–6		
November 11	Hawaii Army	Moiliili Field; Honolulu, Territory of Hawaii	W 37–0		
November 22	Pearl Harbor Navy	Moiliili Field; Honolulu, Territory of Hawaii	W 16–3		
November 29	Honolulu Town Team	Moiliili Field; Honolulu, Territory of Hawaii	W 19–0		
December 6	Occidental	Moiliili Field; Honolulu, Territory of Hawaii	W 18–3		
December 13	Healani Athletic Club	Moiliili Field; Honolulu, Territory of Hawaii	W 20–0		
January 1, 1925	Colorado	Moiliili Field; Honolulu, Territory of Hawaii (Poi Bowl)	W 13–0	10,000	
