= 1924 New Mexico Lobos football team =

American college football season

1924 New Mexico Lobos football
- Conference: Independent
- Record: 5–1
- Head coach: Roy W. Johnson (5th season)
- Captain: Kenneth Grueter
- Home stadium: Varsity field

1924 Western college football independents records
| | Conf. | | | Overall |
| Team | W | L | T | W | | L | | T |
|---|---|---|---|---|---|---|---|---|
| Hawaii | | – | | 8 | – | 0 | – | 0 |
| Saint Mary's | | – | | 8 | – | 1 | – | 0 |
| La Verne | | – | | 7 | – | 1 | – | 1 |
| Tempe Normal | | – | | 7 | – | 1 | – | 1 |
| New Mexico A&M | | – | | 7 | – | 3 | – | 0 |
| Pacific (CA) | | – | | 6 | – | 3 | – | 0 |
| New Mexico | | – | | 5 | – | 1 | – | 0 |
| Cal Aggies | | – | | 5 | – | 4 | – | 1 |
| Nevada | | – | | 3 | – | 4 | – | 1 |
| Santa Clara | | – | | 3 | – | 5 | – | 1 |
| Arizona | | – | | 2 | – | 4 | – | 0 |
| Santa Barbara | | – | | 2 | – | 5 | – | 1 |
| Humboldt State | | – | | 1 | – | 0 | – | 0 |

The 1924 New Mexico Lobos football team represented the University of New Mexico as an independent during the 1924 college football season. In their fifth season under head coach Roy W. Johnson, the Lobos compiled a 5–1 record. Kenneth Grueter was the team captain.

In its 56-0 victory in the season opener, the team did not allow a first down Montezuma College. This remains the only game in school history in which a New Mexico team has not allowed a first down.

== Schedule ==
| Date | Opponent | Site | Result | Source |
|---|---|---|---|---|
| October 11 | Montezuma College | Varsity field; Albuquerque, NM | W 56–0 | |
| October 18 | West Texas State | Varsity field; Albuquerque, NM | W 12–6 | |
| October 25 | Texas Mines | Varsity field; Albuquerque, NM | W 18–0 | |
| November 11 | at Arizona | Tucson, AZ (rivalry) | W 3–0 | |
| November 15 | at New Mexico A&M | Las Cruces, NM (rivalry) | L 0–6 | |
| November 27 | Western State (CO) | Varsity field; Albuquerque, NM | W 14–0 | |
