= 1924 Chico State Wildcats football team =

American college football season

1924 Chico State Wildcats football

CCCC champion CCC North Division champion

CCC Championship Game, W 16–0 vs. Fresno State
- Conference: California Coast Conference
- North Division
- Record: 7–2 (2–0 CCC)
- Head coach: Art Acker (2nd season)
- Home stadium: College Field

1924 California Coast Conference football standings
	Conf.					Overall
Team	W		L		T	W		L		T
Chico State $	2	–	0	–	0	7	–	2	–	0
Fresno State	3	–	0	–	0	7	–	2	–	0
Modesto	2	–	1	–	0	3	–	4	–	1
San Mateo	1	–	1	–	0	?	–	?	–	?
Bakersfield	1	–	2	–	0	2	–	3	–	2
San Jose State	0	–	1	–	0	1	–	4	–	0
Sacramento	0	–	1	–	0	?	–	?	–	?
Cal Poly	0	–	3	–	0	1	–	5	–	0
$ – Conference champion

The 1924 Chico State Wildcats football team represented Chico State Teachers College—now known as California State University, Chico—as a member of the California Coast Conference (CCC) during the 1924 college football season. Led by second-year head coach Art Acker, Chico State compiled an overall record of 7–2 with a mark of 2–0 in conference play, winning the CCC North Division title. The Wildcats played the champion of the South Division, Fresno State, in the conference championship game on December 6. The Wildcats won the game, 16–0, to claim the conference title. The team outscored its opponents 155 to 35 for the season and had six shutout victories. The Wildcats played home games at College Field in Chico, California.

== Schedule ==
Date	Opponent	Site	Result	Source
October 5	Sacramento*	College Field; Chico, CA	W 7–0	
October 11	Preston Industrial School (Note: The Preston School of Industry opened in 1894 to rehabilitate juvenile offenders. It remained open until 2011.)*	College Field; Chico, CA	W 78–0	
October 18	at Cal Aggies*	Davis, CA	L 0–22	
October 25	Pacific (CA)*	College Field; Chico, CA	L 0–7	
November 1	at San Jose State	Spartan Field; San Jose, CA	W 26–0	
November 11	American Legion (Chico)*	College Field; Chico, CA	W 16–0	
November 15	at San Mateo	San Mateo, CA	W 6–0	
November 27	Mare Island Marines*	College Field; Chico, CA	W 13–6	
December 6	Fresno State*	College Field; Chico, CA	W 16–0	
*Non-conference game

\
