= 1924 Fresno State Bulldogs football team =

American college football team

1924 Fresno State Bulldogs football

CCC Championship Game, L 0–16 vs. Chico State
- Conference: California Coast Conference
- Record: 7–2 (3–0 CCC)
- Head coach: Arthur W. Jones (4th season)

1924 California Coast Conference football standings
	Conf.					Overall
Team	W		L		T	W		L		T
Chico State $	2	–	0	–	0	7	–	2	–	0
Fresno State	3	–	0	–	0	7	–	2	–	0
Modesto	2	–	1	–	0	3	–	4	–	1
San Mateo	1	–	1	–	0	?	–	?	–	?
Bakersfield	1	–	2	–	0	2	–	3	–	2
San Jose State	0	–	1	–	0	1	–	4	–	0
Sacramento	0	–	1	–	0	?	–	?	–	?
Cal Poly	0	–	3	–	0	1	–	5	–	0
$ – Conference champion

The 1924 Fresno State Bulldogs football team represented Fresno State Normal School—now known as California State University, Fresno—during the 1924 college football season.

Fresno State competed in the California Coast Conference (CCC) from 1922 to 1924. The 1924 team was led by head coach Arthur W. Jones in his fourth year at the helm. They finished the regular season with a record of seven wins and one loss (7–1, 3–0 CCC).

At the end of the season, the Bulldogs played the co-champion of the conference in the CCC championship game. They were shut out by Chico State in the game, bringing their overall record to seven wins and two losses (7–2, 3–0 CCC). The Bulldogs outscored their opponents 132–44 for the season, including shutting out the other team five times.

== Schedule ==
Date	Opponent	Site	Result	Source
October 11	at Nevada*	Mackay Stadium (Note: This stadium is the predecessor to the current Mackay Stadium, which was opened for the 1966 season.); Reno, NV	L 0–16	
October 18	California Christian*	Fresno, CA	W 31–0	
October 25	Bakersfield	Bakersfield, CA	W 9–0	
November 1	Modesto	Fresno, CA	W 41–6	
November 11	Mare Island Marines*	Fresno, CA	W 10–0	
November 15	at Cal Poly	San Luis Obispo, CA	W 22–6	
November 22	at Pacific (CA)*	C.O.P. Field; Stockton, CA	W 12–0	
November 27	San Diego State*	Fire/Police Baseball Park; Fresno, CA (rivalry)	W 7–0	
December 6	at Chico State*	University Stadium; Chico, CA (CCC Championship)	L 0–16	
*Non-conference game
