= 1924 Arizona Wildcats football team =

American college football season

1924 Arizona Wildcats football
- Conference: Independent
- Record: 2–4
- Head coach: Pop McKale (10th season)
- Captain: Kirke LaShelle

1924 Western college football independents records
	Conf.			Overall
Team	W	L	T	W		L		T
Hawaii		–		8	–	0	–	0
Saint Mary's		–		8	–	1	–	0
La Verne		–		7	–	1	–	1
Tempe Normal		–		7	–	1	–	1
New Mexico A&M		–		7	–	3	–	0
Pacific (CA)		–		6	–	3	–	0
New Mexico		–		5	–	1	–	0
Cal Aggies		–		5	–	4	–	1
Nevada		–		3	–	4	–	1
Santa Clara		–		3	–	5	–	1
Arizona		–		2	–	4	–	0
Santa Barbara		–		2	–	5	–	1
Humboldt State		–		1	–	0	–	0

The 1924 Arizona Wildcats football team represented the University of Arizona as an independent during the 1924 college football season. In their tenth season under head coach Pop McKale, the Wildcats compiled a 2–4 record and were outscored by their opponents, 93 to 40. The team captain was Kirke LaShelle.

== Schedule ==
Date	Opponent	Site	Result	Attendance	Source
October 11	at USC	Los Angeles Memorial Coliseum; Los Angeles, CA	L 0–29	18,000	
October 18	at Utah	Cummings Field; Salt Lake City, UT	L 7–32		
October 25	New Mexico A&M	Tucson, AZ	W 7–0		
November 1	at Nevada	Mackay Field; Reno, NV	L 14–23		
November 11	New Mexico	Tucson, AZ (rivalry)	L 0–3		
November 27	Cal Aggies	Tucson, AZ	W 12–6		
