= 1924 Cal Poly Mustangs football team =

American college football season

1924 Cal Poly Mustangs football
- Conference: California Coast Conference
- Record: 1–5 (0–3 CCC)
- Head coach: Al Agosti (4th season)

1924 California Coast Conference football standings
	Conf.					Overall
Team	W		L		T	W		L		T
Chico State $	2	–	0	–	0	7	–	2	–	0
Fresno State	3	–	0	–	0	7	–	2	–	0
Modesto	2	–	1	–	0	3	–	4	–	1
San Mateo	1	–	1	–	0	?	–	?	–	?
Bakersfield	1	–	2	–	0	2	–	3	–	2
San Jose State	0	–	1	–	0	1	–	4	–	0
Sacramento	0	–	1	–	0	?	–	?	–	?
Cal Poly	0	–	3	–	0	1	–	5	–	0
$ – Conference champion

The 1924 Cal Poly Mustangs football team represented California Polytechnic School—now known as California Polytechnic State University, San Luis Obispo—as a member of the California Coast Conference (CCC) during the 1924 college football season. Led by fourth-year head coach Al Agosti, Cal Poly compiled an overall record of 1–5 with a mark of 0–3 in conference play. The team was outscored by its opponents 193 to 19 for the season and was shut out by the Stanford freshmen, 97–0. The Mustangs played home games in San Luis Obispo, California.

Cal Poly was a two-year school until 1941.

== Schedule ==
Date	Opponent	Site	Result	Source
October 4	at Santa Maria High School*	Santa Maria, CA	L 0–35	
October 11	at Stanford freshmen*	Palo Alto, CA	L 0–97	
October 25	at Modesto	Modesto, CA	L 3–19	
October 31	at Bakersfield	Bakersfield, CA	L 3–20	
November 15	Fresno State	San Luis Obispo, CA	L 6–22	
November 22	Santa Barbara State*	San Luis Obispo, CA	W 7–0	
*Non-conference game
