= 1924 Tempe Normal Owls football team =

American college football season

1924 Tempe Normal Owls football
- Conference: Independent
- Record: 7–1–1
- Head coach: Aaron McCreary (2nd season)
- Home stadium: Normal Field

1924 Western college football independents records
	Conf.			Overall
Team	W	L	T	W		L		T
Hawaii		–		8	–	0	–	0
Saint Mary's		–		8	–	1	–	0
La Verne		–		7	–	1	–	1
Tempe Normal		–		7	–	1	–	1
New Mexico A&M		–		7	–	3	–	0
Pacific (CA)		–		6	–	3	–	0
New Mexico		–		5	–	1	–	0
Cal Aggies		–		5	–	4	–	1
Nevada		–		3	–	4	–	1
Santa Clara		–		3	–	5	–	1
Arizona		–		2	–	4	–	0
Santa Barbara		–		2	–	5	–	1
Humboldt State		–		1	–	0	–	0

The 1924 Tempe Normal Owls football team was an American football team that represented Tempe Normal School (later renamed Arizona State University) as an independent during the 1924 college football season. In their second season under head coach Aaron McCreary, the Owls compiled a 7–1–1 record. Delbert Goddard was the team captain.

== Schedule ==
Date	Opponent	Site	Result	Source
October 11	Sacaton Indians	Normal Field; Tempe, AZ	W 54–0	
October 18	at Phoenix High School	Riverside Park; Phoenix, AZ	W 24–0	
October 25	at Phoenix Indian School	Indian School Stadium; Phoenix, AZ	W 13–10	
November 1	at Arizona Frosh	Tucson, AZ	W 23–13	
November 8	Arizona Frosh	Normal Field; Tempe, AZ	W 27–3	
November 11	at Phoenix College Alumni	Fair Grounds; Phoenix, AZ	L 3–27	
November 15	vs. Sherman Indian High School	Riverside Park; Phoenix, AZ	T 13–13	
November 22	Northern Arizona	Normal Field; Tempe, AZ	W 20–16	
November 27	Phoenix College	Normal Field; Tempe, AZ	W 30–6	
