= 1924 Santa Barbara State Roadrunners football team =

American college football season

1924 Santa Barbara State Roadrunners football
- Conference: Independent
- Record: 2–5–1
- Head coach: Otho J. Gilliland (3rd season)
- Home stadium: Peabody Stadium

1924 Western college football independents records
	Conf.			Overall
Team	W	L	T	W		L		T
Hawaii		–		8	–	0	–	0
Saint Mary's		–		8	–	1	–	0
La Verne		–		7	–	1	–	1
Tempe Normal		–		7	–	1	–	1
New Mexico A&M		–		7	–	3	–	0
Pacific (CA)		–		6	–	3	–	0
New Mexico		–		5	–	1	–	0
Cal Aggies		–		5	–	4	–	1
Nevada		–		3	–	4	–	1
Santa Clara		–		3	–	5	–	1
Arizona		–		2	–	4	–	0
Santa Barbara		–		2	–	5	–	1
Humboldt State		–		1	–	0	–	0

The 1924 Santa Barbara State Roadrunners football team represented Santa Barbara State (Note: University of California, Santa Barbara was known as Santa Barbara State College from 1921 to 1943.) during the 1924 college football season.

Santa Barbara State competed as an independent in 1924. Records may be incomplete, but eight games have been documented. The Roadrunners were led by third-year head coach Otho J. Gilliland and played home games at Peabody Stadium in Santa Barbara, California. They finished the season with a record of two wins, five losses and one tie (2–5–1). Overall, the team was outscored by its opponents 52–176 for the season.

== Schedule ==
Date	Opponent	Site	Result	Source
October 4	California Christian		W 24–0	
October 11	Loyola (CA)	Loyola Field; Los Angeles, CA	L 0–17	
October 17	USC freshmen	Bovard Field; Los Angeles, CA	L 9–46	
October 25	Santa Maria	Peabody Stadium; Santa Barbara, CA	W 0–34	
November 1	La Verne		L 7–24	
November 8	at San Diego State	Balboa Stadium; San Diego, CA	L 6–42	
November 15	Bakersfield	Peabody Stadium; Santa Barbara, CA	T 6–6	
November 22	at Cal Poly	San Luis Obispo, CA	L 0–7	
