= 1929 St. Ignatius Gray Fog football team =

American football team that represented St. Ignatius College

1929 St. Ignatius Gray Fog football
- Conference: Independent
- Record: 4–3–1
- Head coach: Jimmy Needles (6th season)
- Home stadium: Kezar Stadium

1929 Western college football independents records
	Conf.			Overall
Team	W	L	T	W		L		T
Saint Mary's		–		8	–	0	–	1
Arizona		–		7	–	1	–	0
Loyola (CA)		–		6	–	3	–	0
Santa Clara		–		5	–	3	–	0
Gonzaga		–		4	–	3	–	0
Hawaii		–		4	–	3	–	0
New Mexico A&M		–		3	–	2	–	3
St. Ignatius (CA)		–		4	–	3	–	1
Santa Barbara State		–		4	–	4	–	1
New Mexico		–		2	–	4	–	2
Regis		–		3	–	7	–	0
Humboldt State		–		1	–	4	–	1
Arizona State		–		0	–	6	–	0
Columbia (OR)		–				–

The 1929 St. Ignatius Gray Fog football team was an American football team that represented St. Ignatius College (later renamed the University of San Francisco) as an independent during the 1929 college football season. In its sixth season under head coach Jimmy Needles, the Gray Fog compiled a 4–3–1 record and was outscored by a total of 79 to 62.

== Schedule ==
Date	Opponent	Site	Result	Attendance	Source
September 28	San Diego Submarine Base	Kezar Stadium; San Francisco, CA	W 14–0		
October 6	West Coast Army	Kezar Stadium; San Francisco, CA	W 7–0		
	California B team		W 20–19		
October 13	Santa Clara	Kezar Stadium; San Francisco, CA	L 7–20	14,000	
October 27	Saint Mary's	San Francisco, CA	L 0–6		
November 2	at Gonzaga	Gonzaga Stadium; Spokane, WA	W 14–7	5,000	
November 9	Olympic Club	Kezar Stadium; San Francisco, CA	L 0–27		
November 16	at Nevada	Mackay Field; Reno, NV	T 0–0		
