= 1929 Regis Rangers football team =

American college football season

1929 Regis Rangers football
- Conference: Independent
- Record: 3–7
- Head coach: Red Strader (2nd season)
- Captain: Jay Hanley

1929 Western college football independents records
	Conf.			Overall
Team	W	L	T	W		L		T
Saint Mary's		–		8	–	0	–	1
Arizona		–		7	–	1	–	0
Loyola (CA)		–		6	–	3	–	0
Santa Clara		–		5	–	3	–	0
Gonzaga		–		4	–	3	–	0
Hawaii		–		4	–	3	–	0
New Mexico A&M		–		3	–	2	–	3
St. Ignatius (CA)		–		4	–	3	–	1
Santa Barbara State		–		4	–	4	–	1
New Mexico		–		2	–	4	–	2
Regis		–		3	–	7	–	0
Humboldt State		–		1	–	4	–	1
Arizona State		–		0	–	6	–	0
Columbia (OR)		–				–

The 1929 Regis Rangers football team was an American football team that represented Regis College as an independent during the 1929 college football season. In their second season under head coach Red Strader, the Rangers compiled a 3–7 record and outscored opponents by a total of 156 to 153.

== Schedule ==
Date	Opponent	Site	Result	Attendance	Source
September 28	Colorado Agricultural	Denver, CO	L 0–14		
October 5	at Colorado	Colorado Stadium; Boulder, CO	L 13–27	5,000	
October 12	at Mount St. Charles	Butte, MT	W 13–0		
October 19	at 20th Infantry	Cheyenne, WY (Fort D.A. Russell)	W 56–0		
October 26	Chadron State	Denver, CO	L 6–13		
November 2	1st Infantry (Fort D.A. Russell)	Denver, CO	L 12–18		
November 9	at Western State (CO)	Gunnison, CO	L 23–25		
November 16	at Colorado Mines	Golden, CO	L 0–7		
November 23	Colorado Teachers	Denver, CO	W 13–0		
December 7	Denver	DU Stadium; Denver, CO	L 18–32		
