= 1929 Santa Barbara State Roadrunners football team =

American college football season

1929 Santa Barbara State Roadrunners football
- Conference: Independent
- Record: 4–4–1
- Head coach: Harold Davis (2nd season)
- Home stadium: Peabody Stadium

1929 Western college football independents records
	Conf.			Overall
Team	W	L	T	W		L		T
Saint Mary's		–		8	–	0	–	1
Arizona		–		7	–	1	–	0
Loyola (CA)		–		6	–	3	–	0
Santa Clara		–		5	–	3	–	0
Gonzaga		–		4	–	3	–	0
Hawaii		–		4	–	3	–	0
New Mexico A&M		–		3	–	2	–	3
St. Ignatius (CA)		–		4	–	3	–	1
Santa Barbara State		–		4	–	4	–	1
New Mexico		–		2	–	4	–	2
Regis		–		3	–	7	–	0
Humboldt State		–		1	–	4	–	1
Arizona State		–		0	–	6	–	0
Columbia (OR)		–				–

The 1929 Santa Barbara State Roadrunners football team represented Santa Barbara State (Note: University of California, Santa Barbara was known as Santa Barbara State College from 1921 to 1943.) during the 1929 college football season.

Santa Barbara State competed as an Independent in 1929 and 1930. They had been a member of the California Coast Conference (CCC) from 1927 to 1928, but that conference disbanded after the 1928 season. The 1929 Roadrunners were led by second-year head coach Harold Davis and played home games at Peabody Stadium in Santa Barbara, California. They finished the season with a record of four wins, four losses and one tie (4–4–1). Overall, the team outscored its opponents 87–64 for the season.

== Schedule ==
Date	Opponent	Site	Result	Source
September 21 ?	at Stanford JV	Stanford, CA	L 0–24	
September 28	Santa Maria	Peabody Stadium; Santa Barbara, CA	W 18–0	
October 4	at Occidental	Rose Bowl; Pasadena, CA	L 0–14	
October 19	at San Diego State	Balboa Stadium; San Diego, CA	L 6–7	
October 26	Los Angeles Junior College	Peabody Stadium; Santa Barbara, CA	T 6–6	
November 2	at Cal Poly	San Luis Obispo, CA	W 7–0	
November 9	California Christian	Loyola Field; Los Angeles, CA	L 6–13	
November 15	at Redlands	University Field; Redlands, CA	W 13–0	
November 22	Taft	Peabody Stadium; Santa Barbara, CA	W 31–0	
