= 1929 Hawaii Rainbows football team =

American college football season

1929 Hawaii Rainbows football
- Conference: Independent
- Record: 4–3
- Head coach: Otto Klum (9th season)
- Home stadium: Honolulu Stadium

1929 Western college football independents records
	Conf.			Overall
Team	W	L	T	W		L		T
Saint Mary's		–		8	–	0	–	1
Arizona		–		7	–	1	–	0
Loyola (CA)		–		6	–	3	–	0
Santa Clara		–		5	–	3	–	0
Gonzaga		–		4	–	3	–	0
Hawaii		–		4	–	3	–	0
New Mexico A&M		–		3	–	2	–	3
St. Ignatius (CA)		–		4	–	3	–	1
Santa Barbara State		–		4	–	4	–	1
New Mexico		–		2	–	4	–	2
Regis		–		3	–	7	–	0
Humboldt State		–		1	–	4	–	1
Arizona State		–		0	–	6	–	0
Columbia (OR)		–				–

The 1929 Hawaii Rainbows football team represented the University of Hawaiʻi (now known as the University of Hawaiʻi at Mānoa) as an independent during the 1929 college football season. Led by ninth-year head coach Otto Klum, the Rainbows compiled an overall record of 4–3.

== Schedule ==
Date	Opponent	Site	Result	Attendance	Source
October 5	Hawaii alumni	Honolulu Stadium; Honolulu, Territory of Hawaii	W 22–0		
October 15	Honolulu Athletic Club	Honolulu Stadium; Honolulu, Territory of Hawaii	W 14–0		
October 26	Saint Louis School alumni	Honolulu Stadium; Honolulu, Territory of Hawaii	W 32–6		
November 11	Honolulu Town Team	Honolulu Stadium; Honolulu, Territory of Hawaii	W 13–0	8,500	
November 23	at Oregon	Multnomah Field; Portland, OR	L 0–7		
December 14	Santa Clara	Honolulu Stadium; Honolulu, Territory of Hawaii	L 0–25		
January 1, 1930	Washington State	Honolulu Stadium; Honolulu, Territory of Hawaii	L 7–28	12,000	
