= 1929 Columbia Irish football team =

American college football season

1929 Columbia Irish football
- Conference: Independent
- Record: –
- Head coach: Gene Murphy (3rd season)
- Home stadium: Multnomah Stadium

1929 Western college football independents records
	Conf.			Overall
Team	W	L	T	W		L		T
Saint Mary's		–		8	–	0	–	1
Arizona		–		7	–	1	–	0
Loyola (CA)		–		6	–	3	–	0
Santa Clara		–		5	–	3	–	0
Gonzaga		–		4	–	3	–	0
Hawaii		–		4	–	3	–	0
New Mexico A&M		–		3	–	2	–	3
St. Ignatius (CA)		–		4	–	3	–	1
Santa Barbara State		–		4	–	4	–	1
New Mexico		–		2	–	4	–	2
Regis		–		3	–	7	–	0
Humboldt State		–		1	–	4	–	1
Arizona State		–		0	–	6	–	0
Columbia (OR)		–				–

The 1929 Columbia Irish football team was an American football team that represented Columbia University (later renamed the University of Portland) as an independent during the 1929 college football season. In its third year under head coach Gene Murphy, the team compiled a – record. The team played its home games at Multnomah Stadium in Portland, Oregon.

== Schedule ==
Date	Opponent	Site	Result	Attendance	Source
October 12	at Oregon State	Bell Field; Corvallis, OR	L 7–71		
October 18	Puget Sound	Tacoma Stadium; Tacoma, WA	T 0–0		
October 25	Albany (OR)	Portland, OR	W 13–0		
November 16	Linfield	Portland, OR	W 24–12		
November 24	Saint Martin's	Portland, OR	W 35–0		
