= 1929 Arizona Wildcats football team =

American college football season

1929 Arizona Wildcats football
- Conference: Independent
- Record: 7–1
- Head coach: Pop McKale (15th season)
- Captain: Wendell P. Acuff
- Home stadium: Arizona Stadium

1929 Western college football independents records
	Conf.			Overall
Team	W	L	T	W		L		T
Saint Mary's		–		8	–	0	–	1
Arizona		–		7	–	1	–	0
Loyola (CA)		–		6	–	3	–	0
Santa Clara		–		5	–	3	–	0
Gonzaga		–		4	–	3	–	0
Hawaii		–		4	–	3	–	0
New Mexico A&M		–		3	–	2	–	3
St. Ignatius (CA)		–		4	–	3	–	1
Santa Barbara State		–		4	–	4	–	1
New Mexico		–		2	–	4	–	2
Regis		–		3	–	7	–	0
Humboldt State		–		1	–	4	–	1
Arizona State		–		0	–	6	–	0
Columbia (OR)		–				–

The 1929 Arizona Wildcats football team represented the University of Arizona as an independent during the 1929 college football season. In their fifteenth season under head coach Pop McKale, the Wildcats compiled a 7–1 record and outscored their opponents 182 to 22, with six shutouts. The team captain was Wendell P. Acuff.

The 1929 team was the first to play at the new Arizona Stadium in Tucson; the first game was a 35–0 victory over Caltech on October 12. The team also participated in the first night game played at the Rose Bowl, a 16–7 victory over Occidental in the season opener on Friday, September 27.

== Schedule ==
Date	Opponent	Site	Result	Attendance	Source
September 27	at Occidental	Rose Bowl; Pasadena, CA	W 16–7	20,000	
October 12	Caltech	Arizona Stadium; Tucson, AZ	W 35–0	8,000	
October 19	Texas Mines	Arizona Stadium; Tucson, AZ	W 19–0		
October 26	New Mexico A&M	Arizona Stadium; Tucson, AZ	W 28–0	2,500	
November 2	Arizona State	Arizona Stadium; Tucson, AZ (rivalry)	W 26–0		
November 9	vs. Pomona	Phoenix High School Stadium; Phoenix, AZ	L 12–15	7,000	
November 23	at New Mexico	University Field; Albuquerque, NM (rivalry)	W 6–0	3,000	
November 28	Whittier	Arizona Stadium; Tucson, AZ	W 40–0	7,000	
