= 1929 Saint Mary's Gaels football team =

American college football season

1929 Saint Mary's Gaels football
- Conference: Independent
- Record: 8–0–1
- Head coach: Slip Madigan (9th season)
- Home stadium: Ewing Field; Kezar Stadium

1929 Western college football independents records
	Conf.			Overall
Team	W	L	T	W		L		T
Saint Mary's		–		8	–	0	–	1
Arizona		–		7	–	1	–	0
Loyola (CA)		–		6	–	3	–	0
Santa Clara		–		5	–	3	–	0
Gonzaga		–		4	–	3	–	0
Hawaii		–		4	–	3	–	0
New Mexico A&M		–		3	–	2	–	3
St. Ignatius (CA)		–		4	–	3	–	1
Santa Barbara State		–		4	–	4	–	1
New Mexico		–		2	–	4	–	2
Regis		–		3	–	7	–	0
Humboldt State		–		1	–	4	–	1
Arizona State		–		0	–	6	–	0
Columbia (OR)		–				–

The 1929 Saint Mary's Gaels football team was an American football team that represented Saint Mary's College of California during the 1929 college football season. In their ninth season under head coach Slip Madigan, the Gaels compiled an 8–0–1 record, shut out eight of nine opponents, and outscored all opponents by a combined total of 198 to 6. The Gaels' victories included a 24–0 besting of UCLA, a 54–0 besting of Nevada, and a 31–6 victory over Oregon. The lone setback was a scoreless tie with California.

Two Saint Mary's players were selected by the United Press as first-team members of the 1929 All-Pacific Coast football team: halfback Stennett and tackle George Ackerman.

== Schedule ==
Date	Opponent	Site	Result	Attendance	Source
September 29	vs. West Coast Army	Kezar Stadium; San Francisco, CA	W 28–0	10,000	
October 5	at California	California Memorial Stadium; Berkeley, CA	T 0–0	70,000	
October 20	Gonzaga	Kezar Stadium; San Francisco, CA	W 32–0		
October 27	at St. Ignatius (CA)	Ewing Field; San Francisco, CA	W 6–0		
November 3	at Olympic Club	Kezar Stadium; San Francisco, CA	W 17–0	30,000	
November 10	Santa Clara	Kezar Stadium; San Francisco, CA	W 6–0	42,000	
November 16	at UCLA	Los Angeles Memorial Coliseum; Los Angeles, CA	W 24–0	25,000	
November 22	at Nevada	Mackay Field; Reno, NV	W 54–0		
November 28	Oregon	Kezar Stadium; San Francisco, CA (rivalry)	W 31–6	30,000	
