= 1929 Gonzaga Bulldogs football team =

American college football season

1929 Gonzaga Bulldogs football
- Conference: Independent
- Record: 4–3
- Head coach: Robert L. Mathews (1st season)
- Home stadium: Gonzaga Stadium

1929 Western college football independents records
| | Conf. | | | Overall |
| Team | W | L | T | W | | L | | T |
|---|---|---|---|---|---|---|---|---|
| Saint Mary's | | – | | 8 | – | 0 | – | 1 |
| Arizona | | – | | 7 | – | 1 | – | 0 |
| Loyola (CA) | | – | | 6 | – | 3 | – | 0 |
| Santa Clara | | – | | 5 | – | 3 | – | 0 |
| Gonzaga | | – | | 4 | – | 3 | – | 0 |
| Hawaii | | – | | 4 | – | 3 | – | 0 |
| New Mexico A&M | | – | | 3 | – | 2 | – | 3 |
| St. Ignatius (CA) | | – | | 4 | – | 3 | – | 1 |
| Santa Barbara State | | – | | 4 | – | 4 | – | 1 |
| New Mexico | | – | | 2 | – | 4 | – | 2 |
| Regis | | – | | 3 | – | 7 | – | 0 |
| Humboldt State | | – | | 1 | – | 4 | – | 1 |
| Arizona State | | – | | 0 | – | 6 | – | 0 |
| Columbia (OR) | | – | | | | – |

The 1929 Gonzaga Bulldogs football team was an American football team that represented Gonzaga University as an independent during the 1929 college football season. In their first year under head coach Robert L. Mathews, the Bulldogs compiled a 4–3 record and outscored opponents by a total of 104 to 100.

== Schedule ==
| Date | Opponent | Site | Result | Attendance | Source |
|---|---|---|---|---|---|
| September 28 | Ellensburg Normal | Gonzaga Stadium; Spokane, WA | W 31–7 | | |
| October 12 | West Coast Army | Gonzaga Stadium; Spokane, WA | W 31–7 | 4,000 | |
| October 19 | at Saint Mary's | Kezar Stadium; San Francisco, CA | L 0–32 | | |
| October 26 | Mount St. Charles | Gonzaga Stadium; Spokane, WA | W 7–6 | | |
| November 2 | St. Ignatius (CA) | Gonzaga Stadium; Spokane, WA | L 7–14 | 5,000 | |
| November 16 | at Idaho | MacLean Field; Moscow, ID (rivalry) | W 20–14 | 8,000 | |
| November 23 | Washington State | Gonzaga Stadium; Spokane, WA | L 0–20 | 8,000 | |
