= Kermit Schmidt =

American football player (1908–1963)

Profile
- Positions: End, halfback

Personal information
- Born: March 31, 1908; Okeene, Oklahoma, U.S.
- Died: December 1963 (aged 55)

Career information
- College: Cal Aggies

Career history
- 1932: Boston Braves
- 1933: Cincinnati Reds

Kermit Roosevelt Schmidt (March 31, 1908 – December 1963) was an American football end and halfback in the National Football League (NFL) for the Boston Braves and Cincinnati Reds between 1932 and 1933. He was born in Okeene, Oklahoma.

== Early life ==
Schmidt attended Manual Arts High School in Los Angeles. He played college football for the Cal Aggies at the Northern Branch of the College of Agriculture. (Note: University of California, Davis was known as Northern Branch of the College of Agriculture from 1922 to 1959.)
