= 1929 Santa Clara Broncos football team =

American college football season

1929 Santa Clara Broncos football
- Conference: Independent
- Record: 5–3
- Head coach: Clipper Smith (1st season)

1929 Western college football independents records
	Conf.			Overall
Team	W	L	T	W		L		T
Saint Mary's		–		8	–	0	–	1
Arizona		–		7	–	1	–	0
Loyola (CA)		–		6	–	3	–	0
Santa Clara		–		5	–	3	–	0
Gonzaga		–		4	–	3	–	0
Hawaii		–		4	–	3	–	0
New Mexico A&M		–		3	–	2	–	3
St. Ignatius (CA)		–		4	–	3	–	1
Santa Barbara State		–		4	–	4	–	1
New Mexico		–		2	–	4	–	2
Regis		–		3	–	7	–	0
Humboldt State		–		1	–	4	–	1
Arizona State		–		0	–	6	–	0
Columbia (OR)		–				–

The 1929 Santa Clara Broncos football team was an American football team that represented Santa Clara University as an independent during the 1929 college football season. In their first season under head coach Clipper Smith, the Broncos compiled a 5–3 record and outscored opponents by a total of 123 to 67.

== Schedule ==
Date	Opponent	Site	Result	Attendance	Source
September 28	at California	California Memorial Stadium; Berkeley, CA	L 6–27	40,000	
October 13	at St. Ignatius (CA)	Kezar Stadium; San Francisco, CA	W 20–7	14,000	
October 19	at Olympic Club	Kezar Stadium; San Francisco, CA	L 9–20	7,000	
November 2	at West Coast Army	Kezar Stadium; San Francisco, CA	W 13–0		
November 10	at Saint Mary's	Kezar Stadium; San Francisco, CA	L 0–6	42,000	
November 16	at Stanford	Stanford Stadium; Stanford, CA	W 13–7		
November 28	at Loyola (CA)	Wrigley Field; Los Angeles, CA	W 37–0		
December 14	at Hawaii	Honolulu Stadium; Honolulu, HI	W 25–0		
