= Humboldt State Lumberjacks football, 1924–1929 =

American college football seasons

The Humboldt State Lumberjacks football program's first five seasons of competition were from 1924 to 1929, Humboldt State Normal College—now known as California State Polytechnic University, Humboldt—as an independent. Humboldt State did not field a team in 1926.

== 1924 ==
1924 Humboldt State Lumberjacks football
- Conference: Independent
- Record: 1–0
- Head coach: Bert Smith (1st season)

1924 Western college football independents records
	Conf.			Overall
Team	W	L	T	W		L		T
Hawaii		–		8	–	0	–	0
Saint Mary's		–		8	–	1	–	0
La Verne		–		7	–	1	–	1
Tempe Normal		–		7	–	1	–	1
New Mexico A&M		–		7	–	3	–	0
Pacific (CA)		–		6	–	3	–	0
New Mexico		–		5	–	1	–	0
Cal Aggies		–		5	–	4	–	1
Nevada		–		3	–	4	–	1
Santa Clara		–		3	–	5	–	1
Arizona		–		2	–	4	–	0
Santa Barbara		–		2	–	5	–	1
Humboldt State		–		1	–	0	–	0

The 1924 Humboldt State Lumberjacks football team represented Humboldt State Normal College—now known as California State Polytechnic University, Humboldt—as an independent during the 1924 college football season. Led by Bert Smith in his first and only season as head coach, the Lumberjacks compiled a record of 1–0. 1924 was the first year of competition for Humboldt State football program.

=== Schedule ===
Opponent	Site	Result
at Arcata High School	Arcata, CA	W 9–0

== 1925 ==
1925 Humboldt State Lumberjacks football
- Conference: Independent
- Record: 1–3
- Head coach: Cy Falkenberg (1st season)

1925 Western college football independents records
	Conf.			Overall
Team	W	L	T	W		L		T
Hawaii		–		10	–	0	–	0
Tempe State		–		6	–	2	–	0
Loyola (CA)		–		4	–	2	–	0
New Mexico A&M		–		5	–	3	–	1
San Diego State		–		5	–	3	–	1
La Verne		–		5	–	4	–	0
Arizona		–		3	–	3	–	1
Santa Barbara State		–		3	–	4	–	1
Regis		–		2	–	3	–	0
New Mexico		–		2	–	4	–	1
St. Ignatius (CA)		–		2	–	4	–	1
Santa Clara		–		2	–	6	–	0
Humboldt State		–		1	–	3	–	0

The 1925 Humboldt State Lumberjacks football team represented Humboldt State Normal College—now known as California State Polytechnic University, Humboldt—as an independent during the 1925 college football season. Led by Cy Falkenberg in his first and only season as head coach, the Lumberjacks compiled a record of 1–3. 1925 was the second year for the Humboldt State football program. The team only played four games against local high schools.

=== Schedule ===
Date	Opponent	Site	Result	Source
	at Arcata High School	Arcata, CA	L 0–7	
September 18	vs. Fortuna High School	Arcata, CA	W 7–0	
	at Ferndale High School	Ferndale, CA	L 0–7	
September 30	vs. Eureka High School	Arcata, CA	L 6–12	

== 1927 ==
1927 Humboldt State Lumberjacks football
- Conference: Independent
- Record: 1–2
- Head coach: Fred Telonicher (1st season)

1927 Western college football independents records
	Conf.			Overall
Team	W	L	T	W		L		T
New Mexico		–		8	–	0	–	1
Hawaii		–		5	–	2	–	0
Arizona		–		4	–	2	–	1
Regis		–		5	–	3	–	0
Gonzaga		–		5	–	3	–	1
Santa Clara		–		5	–	4	–	2
Loyola (CA)		–		4	–	3	–	1
Tempe State		–		2	–	3	–	1
New Mexico A&M		–		3	–	5	–	1
Humboldt State		–		1	–	2	–	0

The 1927 Humboldt State Lumberjacks football team represented Humboldt State Normal College—now known as California State Polytechnic University, Humboldt—as an independent during the 1927 college football season. Led by first-year head coach Fred Telonicher, the Lumberjacks compiled a record of 1–2. The team played home games in Eureka, California.

The 1927 season was the program's third season and the first in which the team played against another college. In the 1924 and 1925 seasons Humboldt State only played against high school teams and the school did not field a team in 1926. Telonicher was the third head coach for the Lumberjacks in as many seasons.

=== Schedule ===
Date	Time	Opponent	Site	Result	Source
October 29	2:30 p.m.	at Southern Oregon Normal	Van Scoyoc Field; Medford, OR	W 35–0	
		American Legion	Eureka, CA	L 6–7	
November 12		at Southern Oregon Normal	Walter E. Phillips Field?; Ashland, OR	L 0–29	
All times are in Pacific time

== 1928 ==
1928 Humboldt State Lumberjacks football
- Conference: Independent
- Record: 2–1
- Head coach: Fred Telonicher (2nd season)
- Home stadium: Albee Stadium

1928 Western college football independents records
	Conf.			Overall
Team	W	L	T	W		L		T
Arizona		–		5	–	1	–	2
Idaho Southern Branch		–		5	–	1	–	2
Gonzaga		–		6	–	2	–	1
New Mexico		–		5	–	2	–	1
Humboldt State		–		2	–	1	–	0
Loyola (CA)		–		5	–	3	–	0
Tempe State		–		3	–	2	–	1
Regis		–		5	–	4	–	0
Santa Clara		–		5	–	4	–	0
New Mexico A&M		–		4	–	5	–	0
Hawaii		–		2	–	5	–	0

The 1928 Humboldt State Lumberjacks football team represented Humboldt State Normal College—now known as California State Polytechnic University, Humboldt—as an independent during the 1928 college football season. Led by second-year head coach Fred Telonicher, the Lumberjacks compiled a record of 2–1 and outscored their opponents 38–37 in the three games. The team played home games at Albee Stadium in Eureka, California.

=== Schedule ===
Date	Opponent	Site	Result	Source
	Eureka Wildcats	Albee Stadium; Eureka, CA	W 20–6	
	Eureka Wildcats	Albee Stadium; Eureka, CA	L 6–0	
November 12	Southern Oregon Normal	Albee Stadium; Eureka, CA	L 12–31	

== 1929 ==
1929 Humboldt State Lumberjacks football
- Conference: Independent
- Record: 1–4–1
- Head coach: Fred Telonicher (3rd season)
- Home stadium: Albee Stadium

1929 Western college football independents records
	Conf.			Overall
Team	W	L	T	W		L		T
Saint Mary's		–		8	–	0	–	1
Arizona		–		7	–	1	–	0
Loyola (CA)		–		6	–	3	–	0
Santa Clara		–		5	–	3	–	0
Gonzaga		–		4	–	3	–	0
Hawaii		–		4	–	3	–	0
New Mexico A&M		–		3	–	2	–	3
St. Ignatius (CA)		–		4	–	3	–	1
Santa Barbara State		–		4	–	4	–	1
New Mexico		–		2	–	4	–	2
Regis		–		3	–	7	–	0
Humboldt State		–		1	–	4	–	1
Arizona State		–		0	–	6	–	0
Columbia (OR)		–				–

The 1929 Humboldt State Lumberjacks football team represented Humboldt State Normal College—now known as California State Polytechnic University, Humboldt—as an independent during the 1929 college football season. Led by third-year head coach Fred Telonicher, the Lumberjacks compiled a record of 1–4–1. The team played home games at Albee Stadium in Eureka, California.

=== Schedule ===
Date	Opponent	Site	Result	Source
September 28	at Chico State	College Field; Chico, CA	L 3–19	
October 12	Saint Mary's freshmen	Albee Stadium; Eureka, CA	L 6–37	
October 25	Oregon Normal	Albee Stadium; Eureka, CA	L 0–31	
November 1	Santa Rosa	Albee Stadium; Eureka, CA	T 13–13	
November 11	San Francisco College of Pharmacy (Note: The San Francisco College of Pharmacy was founded in 1872 and is now part of the University of California, San Francisco)	Arcata, CA	W 18–6	
November 23	at Southern Oregon Normal	Walter E. Phillips Field?; Ashland, OR	L 7–27	
