= Casino Del Sol Stadium =

Outdoor college football stadium in Tucson, Arizona

- The Sol
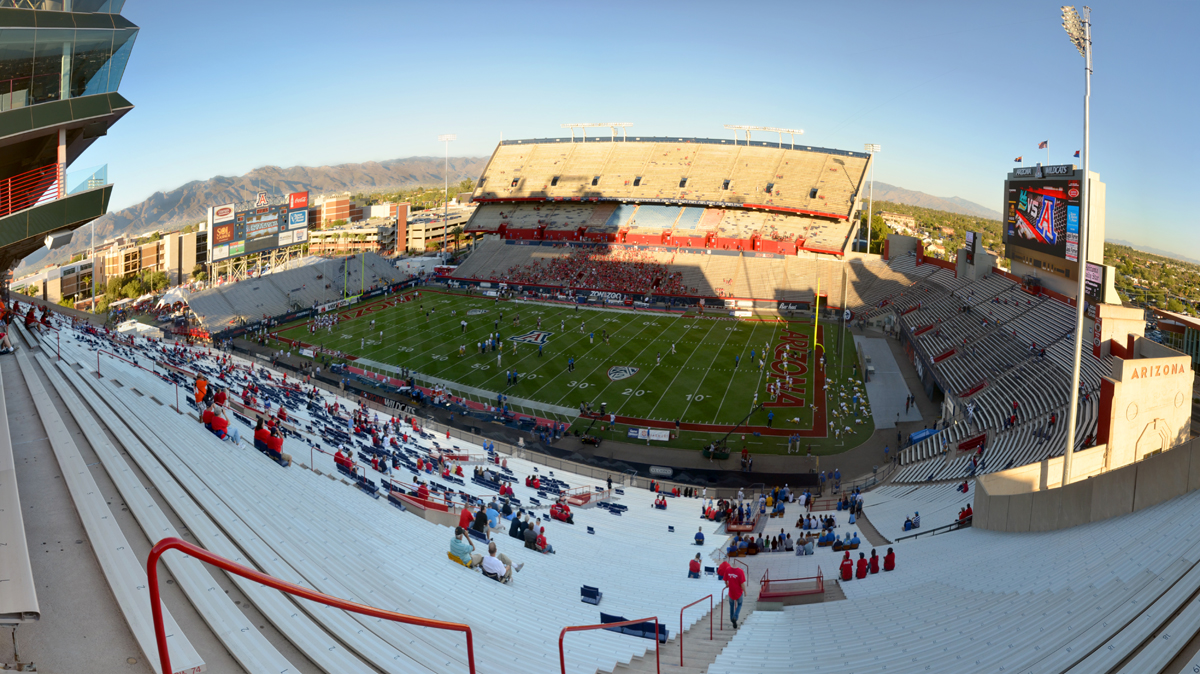
- View from southwest in October 2011

- Location in the United States Location in Arizona
- Interactive map of Casino Del Sol Stadium
- Former names: Arizona Stadium (1929–2025)
- Address: 545 N National Champion Drive
- Location: University of Arizona; Tucson, Arizona, U.S.
- Coordinates: 32.229°N 110.949°W
- Elevation: 2,430 ft (740 m)
- Owner: University of Arizona
- Operator: University of Arizona
- Capacity: 50,782 (2019–present) Former capacity: List: 53,646 (2018); 55,675 (2014–2017); 56,037 (2013); 51,811 (2012); 56,100 (2011); 57,400 (2007–2010); 56,002 (2000–2006); 56,500 (1999); 57,803 (1994–1998); 56,167 (1991–1993); 56,092 (1989–1990); 55,197 (1988); 51,955 (1986–1987); 51,952 (1984–1985); 55,352 (1983); 57,000 (1975–1981); 40,000 (1965–1974); 25,500 (1961–1964); 26,700 (1953–1960); 22,671 (1950–1952); 17,000 (1947–1949); 11,000 (1938–1946); 8,000 (1934–1937); 7,000 (1928–1933)
- Surface: FieldTurf Vortex Core (2022-current); FieldTurf (2013–2021); Natural grass (1928–2012)
- Record attendance: 59,920 (vs. Arizona State) (November 23, 1996)
- Public transit: Tucson Sun Link at 2nd/Cherry

Construction
- Groundbreaking: March–April 1929
- Opened: October 12, 1929; 97 years ago
- Renovated: 2013
- Expanded: 1938, 1947, 1950, 1965, 1976, 1988, 1990, 2011–2013
- Cost: $166,888 ($3.13 million in 2025)
- Architect: Roy Place
- Project manager: J. F. Garfield
- General contractor: Orndorff Construction Co.

Tenants
- Arizona Wildcats (NCAA) (1929–present); Copper Bowl (NCAA) (1989–1999); Arizona Bowl (NCAA) (2015–present)

Website
- arizonawildcats.com/arizona-stadium

Casino Del Sol Stadium (formerly Arizona Stadium until 2025) is an outdoor college football stadium located on the campus of the University of Arizona in Tucson, Arizona. It is the home field of the Arizona Wildcats of the Big 12 Conference. On November 17, 2025, the University of Arizona announced a 20 year naming rights deal with the Pascua Yaqui Tribe, with the venue renamed Casino Del Sol Stadium. It opened under the name Arizona Stadium on October 12, 1929, at a cost of $166,888.

Originally constructed in 1929 to hold 7,000 spectators, the stadium's seating capacity has been expanded numerous times since. As of 2022, the stadium has a total capacity of 50,800. The facility also includes the offices of the Wildcat football program, as well as some non-athletic academic offices, including the Steward Observatory Mirror Lab.

== History ==
Located in central Tucson, the stadium has been home to University of Arizona Wildcats football since 1929. Initially, stadium capacity was 7,000, with the only seating located on the stadium's west side. The first game was a 35–0 shutout of Caltech on October 12. Capacity was increased to 10,000 in 1938 when seats were constructed on the stadium's east side. Four thousand seats were added to both end zones in 1947.

In 1950, a horseshoe configuration was constructed around the south end zone resulting in the addition of almost 8,700 seats. A multi-level press box and 10,000 seats were added to the west grandstand in 1965. The east side of the stadium received a second tier, consisting of 17,000 seats, in 1976, as the Wildcats prepared to leave the WAC for the Pac-8 in 1978.

The Copper Bowl (now the Cactus Bowl) was a postseason bowl game based in Tucson and held at the stadium for 10 years before moving to Phoenix. It is now played in Tempe at Mountain America Stadium, home of rival Arizona State.

=== Expansion and renovation ===
In 1981, the track team stopped using the stadium and the track was removed. Permanent seating was placed at the north end zone in 1988. Following the 1988 season, a new press box with luxury sky boxes was built. The sky boxes include 319 loge seats on the first level, 23 luxury suites between the 2nd and 3rd levels, and a media level on the 4th floor. Because the stadium was in place, the sky boxes are built so that the structure is cantilevered out over the western edge of the stadium seats, without actually touching the stadium. Prior to the 1999 season, a new scoreboard with a video monitor was installed.

In January 2011, it was announced that a new 5,356-square-foot (498 m^{2}) video board would be installed above the south stands in time for the 2011 season. It is the seventh-largest video screen in college football (sixth-largest if non-college-exclusive stadiums are excluded, as Miami shares Hard Rock Stadium with the Miami Dolphins).

In September 2009, Arizona announced plans for the Lowell-Stevens Football Facility, a $72.3 million north end-zone project with seats and luxury boxes atop a four-story complex housing locker rooms, football offices, a weight training area, a cafeteria for student athletes, the upscale Sands Club, and new concessions and bathrooms. The project broke ground after the conclusion of the 2011 season. Because the north bleachers were torn down and the project wouldn't be finished during the 2012 season, several rows of seats were added to the bottom of the south endzone in mid-2012. On July 1, 2013, the project was completed and the team officially moved into the new facility. Because the football offices were formerly housed in the McKale Center, more space was made available for Wildcats basketball and other athletic programs.

In addition to the Lowell-Stevens Football Facility, the playing surface was changed from natural Bermuda grass to FieldTurf, an infilled synthetic turf. The new surface allows the team to practice on the field during the week when previously it was off limits while the grass recovered between games. Because of the extreme sun and temperatures in Tucson, the athletic department chose Revolution CoolPlay FieldTurf, designed to keep the surface temperatures cooler than with other artificial turf.

In November 2025, the Pascua Yaqui Tribe’s Casino Del Sol reached an agreement with the University to purchase naming rights to the stadium as part of a 20-year, $60 million deal.

== Structure, facilities, and other uses ==
The football field runs in the traditional north–south configuration and the new artificial Field Turf sits at an elevation of 2,430 feet (740 m) above sea level. The ZonaZoo student section takes up 9,000 seats on lower east sideline, making it one of the larger student sections in the Big 12. The west side bleachers are generally reserved for season ticket holders and the visiting team gets a section in the southwest corner.

The facility also includes two dormitories, Pinal and Navajo, under the south stands. The Steward Observatory Mirror Lab, a mirror fabrication facility for large telescopes, sits under the east wing. As mentioned above, there are also offices located in the Lowell-Stevens facility housing Football Operations.

In May 2013, the university held spring commencement ceremonies in the stadium for the first time since 1972 (they had been held in McKale Center after it opened in 1973). A reported 25,000 friends and family were in attendance at the ceremony and following light show and fireworks display.

=== Arizona Bowl ===
Since December 2015, the stadium has hosted the Arizona Bowl. Since its inception, the game has matched the Mountain West and Sun Belt conferences. The inaugural game invited the Nevada Wolf Pack and the Colorado State Rams, both of the Mountain West, as the Sun Belt did not field enough bowl-eligible teams. This was the first time a bowl game featured teams from the same conference since the 1979 Orange Bowl, and Nevada won 28–23. Another notable game occurred in 2017, when the New Mexico State Aggies broke their 57-year bowl-less streak and defeated the Utah State Aggies in overtime.

=== Concerts ===
The stadium has been the site of several concerts, including Fleetwood Mac in 1977 and a Jay-Z concert with Kelly Clarkson in 2009.

Date	Artist	Opening act(s)	Tour / Concert name	Attendance	Revenue	Notes
August 27, 1977	Fleetwood Mac	—	Rumours Tour	—	—	
April 29, 2009	Kelly Clarkson	—	All I Ever Wanted Summer Fair Tour	—	—	This concert was a part of "Last Smash Platinum Bash"

=== In film ===
In 1983, the stadium's parking lot, located on the northeast end of the facility, was one of several filming locations for the 20th Century Fox comedy Revenge of the Nerds. The film's Adams College Greek Games sequence was shot in the space on Cherry Avenue between East 4th Street and East University Boulevard.

In the 1970 film C. C. & Company with Joe Namath and Ann-Margaret, the stadium track was used for the finale motorcycle race.

== Gallery ==
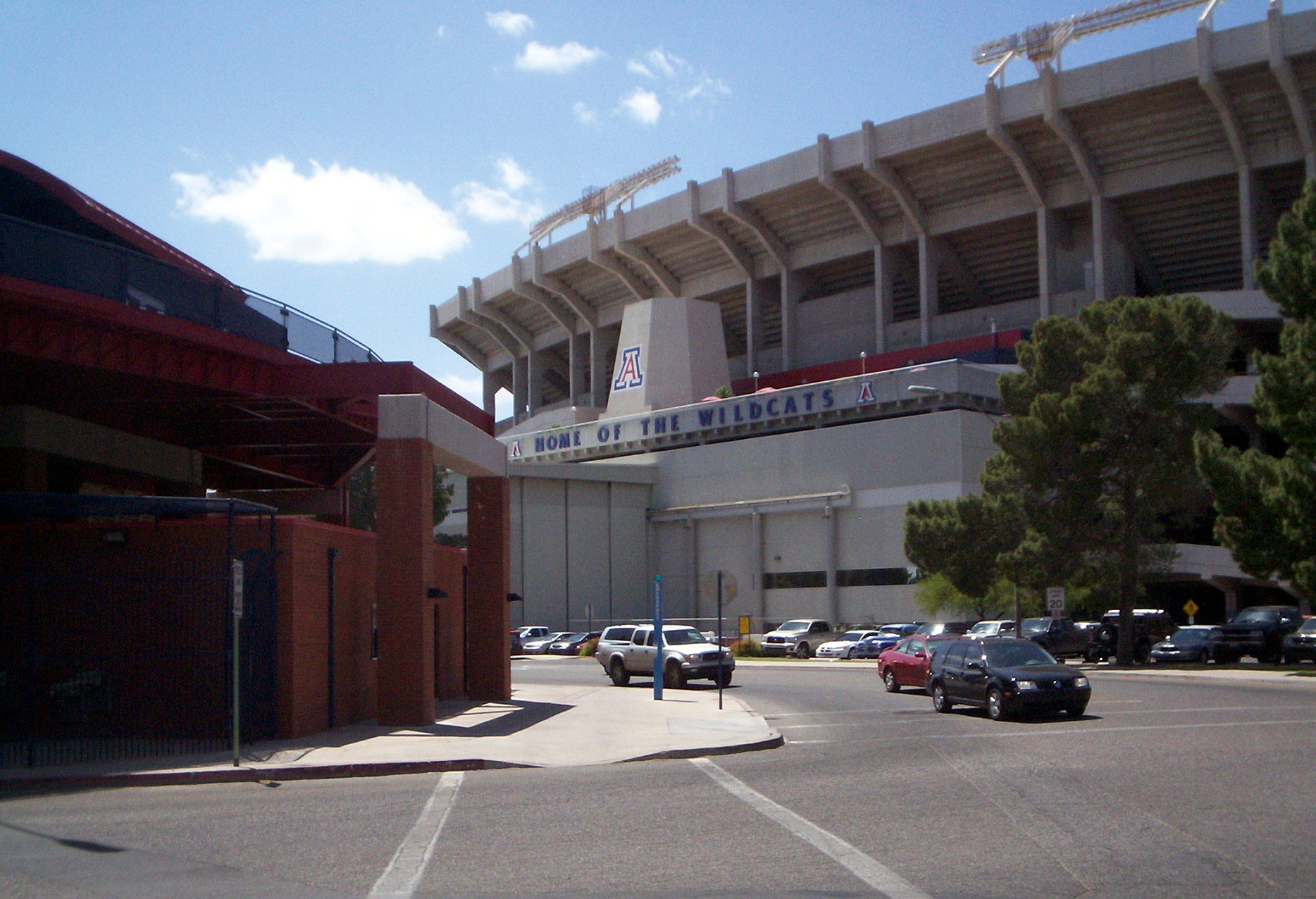
Arizona Stadium, looking towards the east side and the Mirror Lab 2009

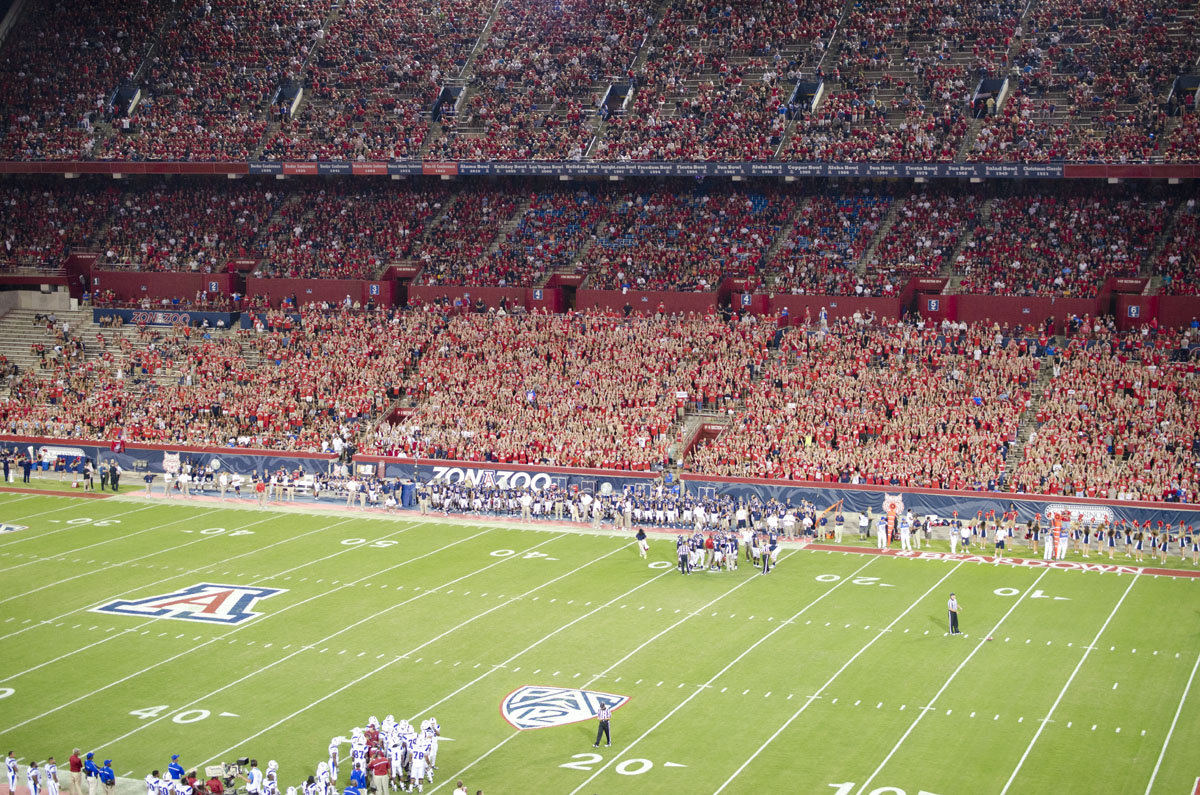
The east side of the stadium, with ZonaZoo, the official student seating section, closest to the field.

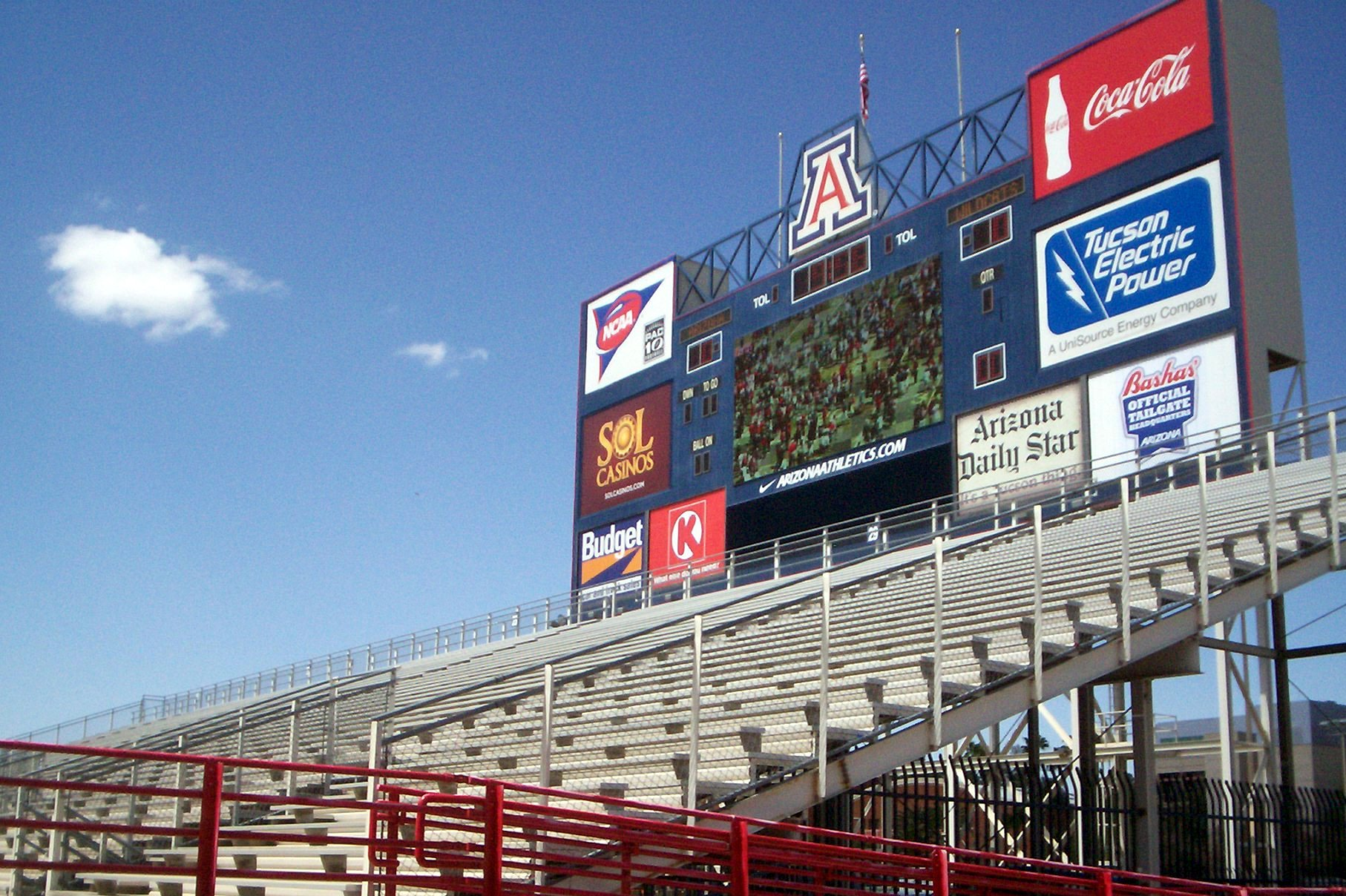
Arizona Stadium's former scoreboard, torn down after the 2011–2012 season

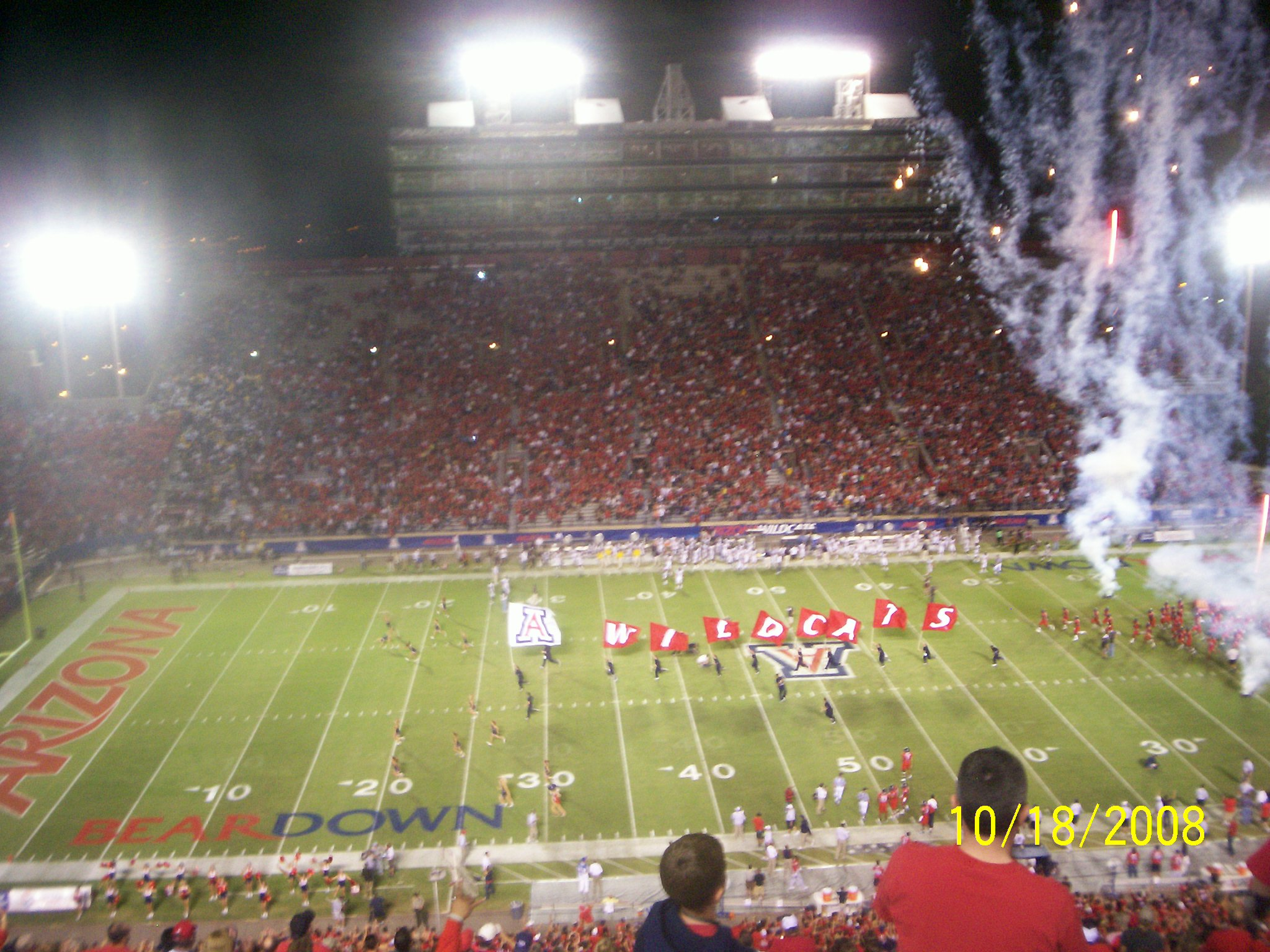
Arizona Stadium at the start of a football game

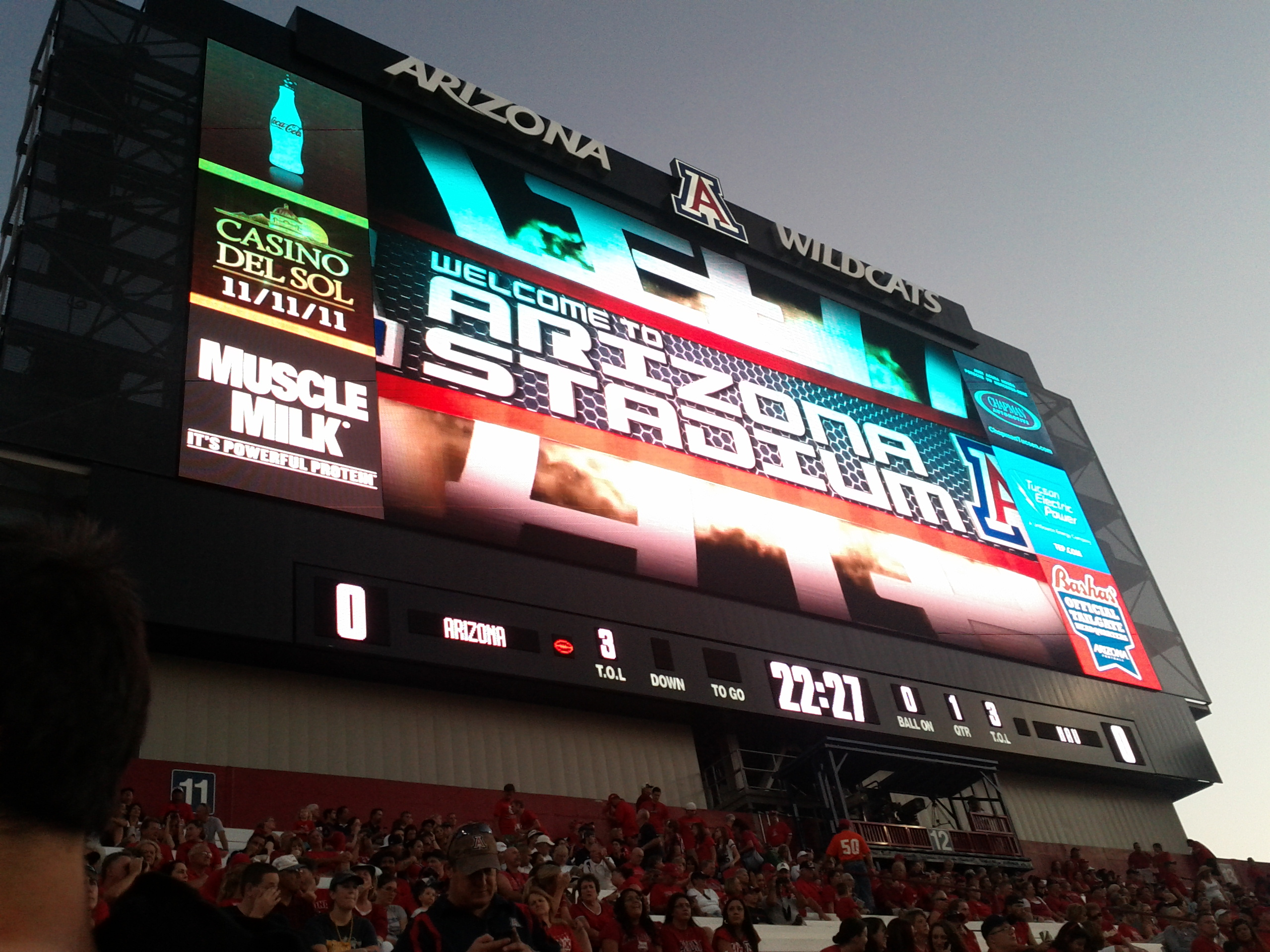
The scoreboard and video display at the south end of Arizona Stadium, as installed for the 2011 season

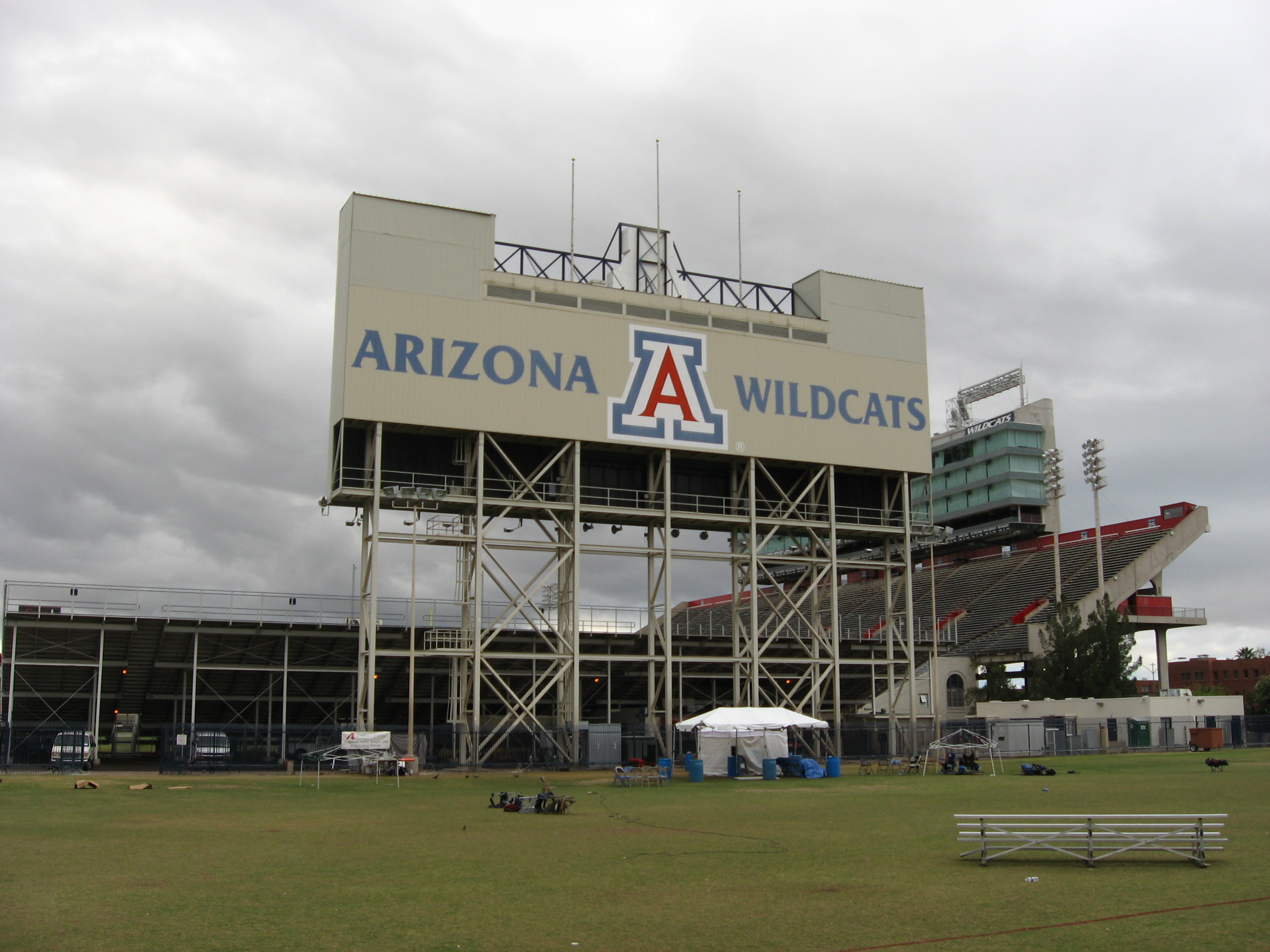
Exterior view

== Attendance records ==
Arizona Stadium Football Attendance Records
Attendance records
Rank	Date	Time	Opponent	Result	Attendance
1	November 23, 1996	4:30 pm	Arizona State	L 14–56	59,920
2	October 24, 1994	12:30 pm	UCLA	W 34–24	58,817
3	November 25, 1994	4:00 pm	Arizona State	W 28–27	58,810
4	September 23, 2006	5:00 pm	USC	L 3–20	58,801
5	October 10, 1998	7:15 pm	UCLA	L 28–52	58,738
6	December 6, 2008	6:00 pm	Arizona State	W 31–10	58,704
7	November 27, 1982	7:00 pm	Arizona State	W 28–18	58,515
8	November 7, 1992	1:30 pm	Washington	W 16–3	58,510
9	September 23, 1995	7:00 pm	USC	L 10–31	58,503
10	October 21, 1995	7:00 pm	Washington	L 17–31	58,471

Largest Crowds vs. Pac-10/12
Rank	Date	Time	Result	Attendance
Arizona State	November 23, 1996	4:30 pm	L 14–56	59,920
Cal	November 5, 1994	4:00 pm	W 13–6	58,374
Colorado	November 8, 2014	6:00 pm	W 38–20	50,177
Oregon	November 21, 2009	6:00 pm	L 41–44 ^{OT}	57,813
Oregon State	October 21, 2006	4:00 pm	L 10–17	57,113
Stanford	October 16, 1993	7:00 pm	W 27–24	57,793
UCLA	October 24, 1994	12:30 pm	W 34–24	58,817
USC	September 23, 2006	5:00 pm	L 3–20	58,801
Utah	September 11, 2004	7:00 pm	L 6–23	52,790
Washington	November 7, 1992	1:30 pm	W 16–3	58,510
Washington State	October 27, 1990	7:00 pm	W 42–34	55,520

== See also ==
- List of NCAA Division I FBS football stadiums
- List of American football stadiums by capacity
- Lists of stadiums

Preceded by first host	Home of the Copper Bowl / Insight.com Bowl; 1989–1999	Succeeded by Bank One Ballpark
Preceded by first host	Home of the Arizona Bowl; 2015–present	Succeeded by current host
