= List of San Jose State Spartans men's basketball head coaches =

This is a list of head men's basketball coaches at San Jose State University, through the conclusion of the 2024-25 NCAA Division I men's basketball season.

Coach	Seasons	Years	Record	Win PCT
Charles Furley	1	1910	7-3	.700
No Head Coach	5	1911-1915	18-24	.429
Bill Spaulding	1	1916	4-4	.500
Karl Hazeltine	4	1917-1918, 1920-1921	7-13	.350
Dave Wooster	2	1922-1923	17-9	.654
Hovey McDonald	12	1924-1935	143-80	.641
Bill Hubbard	6	1936-1940, 1945	65-57	.533
Ed Blesh	1	1943	9-12	.429
Walt McPherson	17	1941-1942, 1946-1960	262-207	.563
Stu Inman	6	1961-1966	78-68	.534
Dan Glines	5	1967-1971	43-80	.350
Ivan Guevara	8	1972-1979	98-118	.454
Bill Berry	10	1980-1989	143-144	.498
Stan Morrison	9	1990-1998	62-172	.265
Phil Johnson	4	1999, 2003-2005	31-82	.274
Steve Barnes	3	2000-2002	39-51	.433
George Nessman	8	2006-2013	86-161	.348
Dave Wojcik	4	2014-2017	32-90	.262
Jean Prioleau	4	2018-2021	20-93	.177
Tim Miles	4	2022-2025	53-80	.398
Totals	114		1217-1548	.440
