= List of San Jose State Spartans head football coaches =

The San Jose State Spartans college football team represent San Jose State University in the Mountain West Conference. The Spartans competed in the National Collegiate Athletic Association (NCAA) College Division in the years 1921–1968. In 1969, the team moved to National Collegiate Athletic Association (NCAA) Division I.

Through the 2023 season, the program has had 32 head coaches across its 106 seasons of competition, including one coach who served multiple tenures. Several coaches in the history of Spartans football have received national and conference honors and have been inducted into various Halls of Fame, including Pop Warner, Bob Bronzan, Terry Shea, John Ralston, Dick Tomey and Brent Brennan. The program has also produced numerous former players who later became successful coaches including Bill Walsh, Dick Vermeil and Terry Donahue.

== Key ==
Key to symbols in coaches list
General		Overall		Conference		Postseason (Note: Although the first Rose Bowl Game was played in 1902, it has been continuously played since the 1916 game, and is recognized as the oldest bowl game by the NCAA. "—" indicates any season prior to 1916 when postseason games were not played.)	
No.	Order of coaches (Note: A running total of the number of head coaches, with coaches who served separate tenures being counted only once. Interim head coaches are represented with "Int" and are not counted in the running total. "—" indicates the team played but either without a coach or no coach is on record. "X" indicates an interim year without play.)	GC	Games coached	CW	Conference wins	PW	Postseason wins
DC	Division championships	OW	Overall wins	CL	Conference losses	PL	Postseason losses
CC	Conference championships	OL	Overall losses	CT	Conference ties	PT	Postseason ties
NC	National championships	OT	Overall ties (Note: Overtime rules in college football were introduced in 1996, making ties impossible in the period since.)	C%	Conference winning percentage		
†	Elected to the College Football Hall of Fame	O%	Overall winning percentage (Note: When computing the win–loss percentage, a tie counts as half a win and half a loss.)				

== Coaches ==
List of head football coaches showing season(s) coached, overall records, conference records, postseason records, championships and selected awards (Note: Statistics correct as of the end of the 2025 NCAA Division I FBS football season.)
No.	Name (Note: The head coach for the 1892 season is unknown.)	Year(s) (Note: San Jose State did not field teams during the 1894, 1896–1897, 1901–1920, and 1943–1945 seasons.)	Season(s)	GC	OW	OL	OT	O%	CW	CL	CT	C%	PW	PL	PT	DC	CC	NC	Awards
1	James E. Addicott	1893; 1895; 1900	1, 1, 1	16	6	6	4	0.500	—	—	—	—	—	—	—	—	—	0	—
2	Thad McKay	1898	1	6	5	0	1	0.917	—	—	—	—	—	—	—	—	—	0	—
3	Jess Woods	1899	1	10	6	3	1	0.650	—	—	—	—	—	—	—	—	—	0	—
4	Fielding H. Yost^{†}	1900	1	1	1	0	0	1.000	—	—	—	—	—	—	—	—	—	0	—
5	David Wooster	1921–1922	2	14	3	10	1	0.250	0	3	0	.000	—	—	—	—	0	0	—
6	Hovey C. McDonald	1923	1	6	0	6	0	.000	0	4	0	.000	—	—	—	—	0	0	—
7	Ernesto R. Knollin	1924–1928	5	38	14	22	2	0.395	11	15	1	0.426	—	—	—	—	1	0	—
8	Mush Crawford	1929–1931	3	24	6	14	4	0.333	3	8	2	0.308	—	—	—	—	0	0	—
9	Dudley DeGroot	1932–1939	8	87	60	19	8	0.736	11	1	5	0.794	—	—	—	—	3	0	—
10	Ben Winkelman	1940–1941	2	23	16	4	3	0.761	5	0	1	0.917	—	—	—	—	2	0	—
11	Glenn Hartranft	1942	1	9	7	2	0	0.778	0	0	0	–	—	—	—	—	0	0	—
12	Wilbur V. Hubbard	1946–1947	2	48	36	11	1	0.760	16	2	0	0.889	2	0	0	—	3	0	—
13	Bob Bronzan	1950–1956	7	67	32	30	5	0.515	—	—	—	—	0	0	0	—	—	0	—
14	Bob Titchenal	1957–1964	8	80	33	46	1	0.419	—	—	—	—	0	0	0	—	—	0	—
15	Harry Anderson	1965–1968	4	39	13	26	0	0.316	—	—	—	—	0	0	0	—	—	0	—
16	Joe McMullen	1969–1970	2	13	3	10	0	0.231	2	1	0	0.667	0	0	0	—	0	0	—
17	Dewey King	1970–1972	3	30	10	20	0	0.333	6	7	0	0.462	0	1	0	—	0	0	—
18	Darryl Rogers	1973–1975	3	34	22	9	3	0.691	9	2	2	0.769	0	0	0	—	1	0	—
19	Lynn Stiles	1976–1978	3	34	18	16	0	0.529	10	3	0	0.769	0	0	0	—	2	0	—
20	Jack Elway	1979–1983	5	56	35	20	1	0.634	19	7	1	0.722	0	1	0	—	1	0	—
21	Claude Gilbert	1984–1989	6	69	38	30	1	0.558	30	11	1	0.726	1	1	0	—	2	0	—
22	Terry Shea	1990–1991	2	23	15	6	2	0.696	13	1	0	0.929	1	0	0	—	2	0	Big West Coach of the Year (1990)
23	Ron Turner	1992	1	11	7	4	0	0.636	4	2	0	0.667	0	0	0	—	0	0	—
24	John Ralston^{†}	1993–1996	4	45	11	34	0	0.244	11	26	0	0.297	0	0	0	0	0	0	—
25	Dave Baldwin	1997–2000	4	45	18	27	—	0.400	13	17	—	0.433	0	0	—	0	0	0	—
26	Fitz Hill	2001–2004	4	47	14	33	—	0.298	9	21	—	0.300	0	0	—	—	0	0	—
27	Dick Tomey	2005–2009	5	60	25	35	—	0.417	16	24	—	0.400	1	0	—	—	0	0	—
28	Mike MacIntyre	2010–2012	3	37	16	21	—	0.432	8	13	—	0.381	0	0	—	—	0	0	—
Int	Kent Baer	2012	1	1	1	0	—	1.000	0	0	—	–	1	0	—	—	0	0	—
29	Ron Caragher	2013–2016	4	49	19	30	—	0.388	14	18	—	0.438	1	0	—	0	0	0	—
30	Brent Brennan	2017–2023	7	82	34	48	—	0.415	25	30	—	0.455	0	3	—	2	2	0	Mountain West Coach of the Year (2020)
31	Ken Niumatalolo	2024–present	2	25	10	15	—	0.400	5	10	—	0.333	0	1	—	0	0	0	—
