= 1923 Santa Barbara State Roadrunners football team =

American college football season

1923 Santa Barbara State Roadrunners football
- Conference: Independent
- Record: 3-3
- Head coach: Otho J. Gilliland (2nd season)

1923 Western college football independents records
	Conf.			Overall
Team	W	L	T	W		L		T
New Mexico A&M		–		9	–	0	–	0
La Verne		–		7	–	2	–	1
Hawaii		–		5	–	1	–	2
Saint Mary's		–		5	–	3	–	1
Arizona		–		5	–	3	–	0
Tempe Normal		–		4	–	2	–	0
Gonzaga		–		4	–	3	–	0
Santa Clara		–		3	–	4	–	1
New Mexico		–		3	–	5	–	0
Nevada		–		2	–	3	–	3
Santa Barbara State		–		2	–	4	–	0
Cal Aggies		–		2	–	7	–	0

The 1923 Santa Barbara State Roadrunners football team represented Santa Barbara State (Note: University of California, Santa Barbara was known as Santa Barbara State College from 1921 to 1943.) during the 1923 college football season.

Santa Barbara State competed as an independent in 1923. Records may be incomplete, but six games have been documented. The Roadrunners were led by second-year head coach Otho J. Gilliland and played home games in Santa Barbara, California. They finished the season with a record of three wins and three losses (3–3). Overall, the team was outscored by its opponents 92–107 for the season.

== Schedule ==
Date	Opponent	Site	Result	Source
October 6	at Cal Poly	San Luis Obispo, CA	W 20–6	
October 13	Loyola (CA)	Santa Barbara, CA	W 13–0	
October 20	La Verne		L 12–26	
November 3	San Diego State	Pershing Park; Santa Barbara, CA	L 13–38	
November 10	Cal Poly	Santa Barbara, CA	W 21–19	
November 17	at Bakersfield	Bakersfield, CA	L 13–18	
