= 1925 Santa Barbara State Roadrunners football team =

American college football season

1925 Santa Barbara State Roadrunners football
- Conference: Independent
- Record: 3–4–1
- Head coach: Otho J. Gilliland (4th season)
- Home stadium: Peabody Stadium

1925 Western college football independents records
| | Conf. | | | Overall |
| Team | W | L | T | W | | L | | T |
|---|---|---|---|---|---|---|---|---|
| Hawaii | | – | | 10 | – | 0 | – | 0 |
| Tempe State | | – | | 6 | – | 2 | – | 0 |
| Loyola (CA) | | – | | 4 | – | 2 | – | 0 |
| New Mexico A&M | | – | | 5 | – | 3 | – | 1 |
| San Diego State | | – | | 5 | – | 3 | – | 1 |
| La Verne | | – | | 5 | – | 4 | – | 0 |
| Arizona | | – | | 3 | – | 3 | – | 1 |
| Santa Barbara State | | – | | 3 | – | 4 | – | 1 |
| Regis | | – | | 2 | – | 3 | – | 0 |
| New Mexico | | – | | 2 | – | 4 | – | 1 |
| St. Ignatius (CA) | | – | | 2 | – | 4 | – | 1 |
| Santa Clara | | – | | 2 | – | 6 | – | 0 |
| Humboldt State | | – | | 1 | – | 3 | – | 0 |

The 1925 Santa Barbara State Roadrunners football team was an American football team that represented Santa Barbara State College (Note: University of California, Santa Barbara was known as Santa Barbara State College from 1921 to 1943.) during the 1925 college football season.

Santa Barbara State competed as an independent in 1925. Records may be incomplete, but eight games have been documented. The Roadrunners were led by fourth-year head coach Otho J. Gilliland and played home games at Peabody Stadium in Santa Barbara, California. They finished the season with a record of three wins, four losses and one tie (3–4–1). Overall, the team outscored its opponents 82–67 for the season.

== Schedule ==
| Date | Opponent | Site | Result | Source |
|---|---|---|---|---|
| October 3 | Caltech | Peabody Stadium; Santa Barbara, CA | L 7–27 | |
| October 10 | Loyola (CA) | Loyola Field; Los Angeles, CA | L 0–6 | |
| October 17 | Bakersfield | Griffith Field; Bakersfield, CA | W 14–12 | |
| October 24 | Southwestern University | Peabody Stadium; Santa Barbara, CA | W 49–0 | |
| October 31 | California Christian | | T 0–0 | |
| November 7 | San Diego State | Peabody Stadium; Santa Barbara, CA | L 0–10 | |
| November 11 | at Ventura | Oxnard, CA | L 6–12 | |
| November 14 | Cal Poly | Peabody Stadium; Santa Barbara, CA | W 6–0 | |
