= 1923 Nevada Wolf Pack football team =

American college football season

1923 Nevada Wolf Pack football
- Conference: Independent
- Record: 2–3–3
- Head coach: Ray Courtright (5th season)
- Home stadium: Mackay Field

1923 Western college football independents records
	Conf.			Overall
Team	W	L	T	W		L		T
New Mexico A&M		–		9	–	0	–	0
La Verne		–		7	–	2	–	1
Hawaii		–		5	–	1	–	2
Saint Mary's		–		5	–	3	–	1
Arizona		–		5	–	3	–	0
Tempe Normal		–		4	–	2	–	0
Gonzaga		–		4	–	3	–	0
Santa Clara		–		3	–	4	–	1
New Mexico		–		3	–	5	–	0
Nevada		–		2	–	3	–	3
Santa Barbara State		–		2	–	4	–	0
Cal Aggies		–		2	–	7	–	0

The 1923 Nevada Wolf Pack football team was an American football team that represented the University of Nevada as an independent during the 1923 college football season. In their fifth and final season under head coach Ray Courtright, the team compiled a 2–3–2 record, scored 97 points, and allowed 97 points.

The team played the undefeated 1923 California Golden Bears football team to a scoreless tie, the only setback sustained in Cal's otherwise perfect season.

On March 31, 1924, Courtright announced his resignation as athletic director and head coach from the University of Nevada, effective at the end of the school year. Courtright took a post as head coach at Colorado School of Mines. Courtright compiled a 26–13–7 record in five seasons as Nevada's head football coach.

Bill Gutteron played quarterback for the Wolf Pack from 1923 to 1925. He later played quarterback in the National Football League (NFL) for the Los Angeles Buccaneers.

== Schedule ==
Date	Opponent	Site	Result	Attendance	Source
September 22	Olympic Club	Mackay Field; Reno, NV	L 3–27		
September 29	Cal Aggies	Mackay Field; Reno, NV	W 41–0		
October 6	at Stanford	Stanford Stadium; Stanford, CA	L 0–27		
October 13	at USC	Los Angeles Memorial Coliseum; Los Angeles, CA	L 0–33	20,000	
October 27	Santa Clara^{†}	Mackay Field; Reno, NV	T 7–7		
November 3	at California	California Field; Berkeley, CA	T 0–0		
November 10	Fresno State	Mackay Field; Reno, NV	W 46–3		
November 29	at Saint Mary's	Ewing Field; San Francisco, CA	T 10–10	7,500	
^{†}Homecoming
