= 1923 New Mexico A&M Aggies football team =

American college football season

1923 New Mexico A&M Aggies football
- Conference: Independent
- Record: 9–0
- Head coach: R. R. Brown (1st season)
- Home stadium: Miller Field

1923 Western college football independents records
	Conf.			Overall
Team	W	L	T	W		L		T
New Mexico A&M		–		9	–	0	–	0
La Verne		–		7	–	2	–	1
Hawaii		–		5	–	1	–	2
Saint Mary's		–		5	–	3	–	1
Arizona		–		5	–	3	–	0
Tempe Normal		–		4	–	2	–	0
Gonzaga		–		4	–	3	–	0
Santa Clara		–		3	–	4	–	1
New Mexico		–		3	–	5	–	0
Nevada		–		2	–	3	–	3
Santa Barbara State		–		3	–	3	–	0
Cal Aggies		–		2	–	7	–	0

The 1923 New Mexico A&M Aggies football team was an American football team that represented New Mexico College of Agriculture and Mechanical Arts (now known as New Mexico State University) during the 1923 college football season. In their first year under head coach R. R. Brown, the Aggies compiled a 9–0 record, shut out five opponents, and outscored all opponents by a total of 218 to 17. The team played home games on Miller Field, sometimes also referred to as College Field.

== Schedule ==
Date	Opponent	Site	Result	Source
September 29	Las Cruces High School		W 21–0	
October 6	El Paso High School		W 10–0	
October 13	El Paso Garden Grocers		W 33–0	
October 20	Simmons (TX)		W 13–6	
October 27	Beaumont Hospital		W 32–6	
November 3	at Montezuma College		W 73–3	
November 10	at Texas Mines	El Paso High School stadium; El Paso, TX (rivalry)	W 23–2	
November 17	at New Mexico	Varsity field; Albuquerque, NM (rivalry)	W 6–0	
	New Mexico Military		W 7–0	
