= 1925 Regis Rangers football team =

American college football season

1925 Regis Rangers football
- Conference: Independent
- Record: 2–3

1925 Western college football independents records
| | Conf. | | | Overall |
| Team | W | L | T | W | | L | | T |
|---|---|---|---|---|---|---|---|---|
| Hawaii | | – | | 10 | – | 0 | – | 0 |
| Tempe State | | – | | 6 | – | 2 | – | 0 |
| Loyola (CA) | | – | | 4 | – | 2 | – | 0 |
| New Mexico A&M | | – | | 5 | – | 3 | – | 1 |
| San Diego State | | – | | 5 | – | 3 | – | 1 |
| La Verne | | – | | 5 | – | 4 | – | 0 |
| Arizona | | – | | 3 | – | 3 | – | 1 |
| Santa Barbara State | | – | | 3 | – | 4 | – | 1 |
| Regis | | – | | 2 | – | 3 | – | 0 |
| New Mexico | | – | | 2 | – | 4 | – | 1 |
| St. Ignatius (CA) | | – | | 2 | – | 4 | – | 1 |
| Santa Clara | | – | | 2 | – | 6 | – | 0 |
| Humboldt State | | – | | 1 | – | 3 | – | 0 |

The 1925 Regis Rangers football team was an American football team that represented Regis College as an independent during the 1925 college football season. The team compiled a 2–3 record and outscored opponents by a total of 68 to 40.

== Schedule ==
| Date | Opponent | Site | Result | Attendance | Source |
|---|---|---|---|---|---|
| September 26 | Colorado Mines | Denver, CO | W 14–0 | | |
| October 3 | at Colorado Agricultural | Fort Collins, CO | L 0–34 | | |
| October 10 | at Colorado College | Colorado Springs, CO | L 0–10 | | |
| October 24 | at Wyoming | Campus athletic grounds; Laramie, WY | L 0–24 | | |
| October 31 | South Dakota Mines | Denver, CO | W 26–0 | | |
