= 1925 Tempe State Bulldogs football team =

American college football season

1925 Tempe State Bulldogs football
- Conference: Independent
- Record: 6–2
- Head coach: Aaron McCreary (3rd season)

1925 Western college football independents records
| | Conf. | | | Overall |
| Team | W | L | T | W | | L | | T |
|---|---|---|---|---|---|---|---|---|
| Hawaii | | – | | 10 | – | 0 | – | 0 |
| Tempe State | | – | | 6 | – | 2 | – | 0 |
| Loyola (CA) | | – | | 4 | – | 2 | – | 0 |
| New Mexico A&M | | – | | 5 | – | 3 | – | 1 |
| San Diego State | | – | | 5 | – | 3 | – | 1 |
| La Verne | | – | | 5 | – | 4 | – | 0 |
| Arizona | | – | | 3 | – | 3 | – | 1 |
| Santa Barbara State | | – | | 3 | – | 4 | – | 1 |
| Regis | | – | | 2 | – | 3 | – | 0 |
| New Mexico | | – | | 2 | – | 4 | – | 1 |
| St. Ignatius (CA) | | – | | 2 | – | 4 | – | 1 |
| Santa Clara | | – | | 2 | – | 6 | – | 0 |
| Humboldt State | | – | | 1 | – | 3 | – | 0 |

The 1925 Tempe State Bulldogs football team was an American football team that represented Tempe State Teachers College (later renamed Arizona State University) as an independent during the 1925 college football season. In their third season under head coach Aaron McCreary, the Bulldogs compiled a 6–2 record and outscored their opponents by a combined total of 154 to 59. The team's games included a 13–3 loss in the Arizona–Arizona State football rivalry. Ed Ellsworth was the team captain.

== Schedule ==
| Date | Opponent | Site | Result | Source |
|---|---|---|---|---|
| October 3 | Sacaton Indians | Tempe, AZ | W 55–0 | |
| October 10 | at Arizona | Tucson, AZ (rivalry) | L 3–13 | |
| October 24 | vs. Phoenix Junior College | Riverside Park; Phoenix, AZ | W 34–0 | |
| October 31 | at Arizona State–Flagstaff | Flagstaff, AZ | W 3–0 | |
| November 7 | vs. Arizona frosh | Phoenix Indian School Stadium; Phoenix, AZ | W 20–6 | |
| November 12 | at Phoenix Indian School | Arizona State Fair; Phoenix, AZ | W 11–7 | |
| November 28 | at Texas Mines | Dudley Field; El Paso, TX | L 12–27 | |
| December 12 | vs. Phoenix Union High School | Riverside Park; Phoenix, AZ | W 18–6 | |
