= 1923 Cal Aggies football team =

American college football season

1923 Cal Aggies football
- Conference: Independent
- Record: 2–7
- Head coach: William L. Driver (1st season)
- Captain: Fred Klingaman

1923 Western college football independents records
	Conf.			Overall
Team	W	L	T	W		L		T
New Mexico A&M		–		9	–	0	–	0
La Verne		–		7	–	2	–	1
Hawaii		–		5	–	1	–	2
Saint Mary's		–		5	–	3	–	1
Arizona		–		5	–	3	–	0
Tempe Normal		–		4	–	2	–	0
Gonzaga		–		4	–	3	–	0
Santa Clara		–		3	–	4	–	1
New Mexico		–		3	–	5	–	0
Nevada		–		2	–	3	–	3
Santa Barbara State		–		2	–	4	–	0
Cal Aggies		–		2	–	7	–	0

The 1923 Cal Aggies football team represented the Northern Branch of the College of Agriculture—now known as the University of California, Davis—as an independent during the 1923 college football season. The team was known as the Cal Aggies or California Aggies. Led by first-year head coach William L. Driver, the Cal Aggies compiled a record of 2–7 and were outscored by their opponents 190 to 43 for the season. The Cal Aggies played home games in Davis, California.

== Schedule ==
Date	Opponent	Site	Result	Source
September 22	Santa Clara	Davis, CA	L 6–7	
September 29	at Nevada	Mackay Stadium (Note: This stadium is the predecessor to the current Mackay Stadium, which was opened for the 1966 season.); Reno, NV	L 0–40	
October 6	at Stanford freshmen	Stanford, CA	W 7–6	
October 13	at California freshmen	California Field; Berkeley, CA	L 0–18	
October 20	at Chico State	College field; Chico, CA	L 0–38	
October 27	Fresno State	Davis, CA	L 14–25	
November 3	Saint Mary’s	Sacramento, CA	L 7–42	
November 12	Arizona	Phoenix, AZ	W 9–7	
November 17	Pacific (CA)	Davis, CA	L 0–7	
