= 1925 Fresno State Bulldogs football team =

American college football season

1925 Fresno State Bulldogs football
- Conference: Far Western Conference
- Record: 2–6–1 (0–4 FWC)
- Head coach: Arthur W. Jones (5th season)

1925 Far Western Conference football standings
	Conf.					Overall
Team	W		L		T	W		L		T
Saint Mary's $	3	–	0	–	0	8	–	2	–	0
Nevada	3	–	1	–	0	4	–	3	–	1
Cal Aggies	2	–	2	–	0	5	–	3	–	0
Pacific (CA)	1	–	2	–	0	5	–	2	–	0
Fresno State	0	–	4	–	0	2	–	6	–	1
$ – Conference champion

The 1925 Fresno State Bulldogs football team represented Fresno State Normal School—now known as California State University, Fresno—during the 1925 college football season.

Fresno State competed in the inaugural season of the Far Western Conference (FWC). (Note: The Northern California Athletic Conference (NCAC) was known as the Far Western Conference (FWC) from its founding in 1925 to 1982.) The 1925 team was led by head coach Arthur W. Jones in his fifth year at the helm. They finished with a record of two wins, six losses and one tie (2–6–1, 0–4 FWC). The Bulldogs were outscored by their opponents 122–192 for the season.

== Schedule ==
Date	Opponent	Site	Result	Source
September 26	at Modesto*	Modesto, CA	T 6–6	
October 3	Occidental*	Fresno, CA	L 10–33	
October 10	Santa Clara*	Fresno, CA	L 0–6	
October 24	at San Jose State*	Spartan Field; San Jose, CA (rivalry)	W 23–7	
October 31	Cal Aggies	Fresno, CA	L 0–6	
November 7	at Nevada	Mackay Stadium (Note: This stadium is the predecessor to the current Mackay Stadium, which was opened for the 1966 season.); Reno, NV	L 6–60	
November 11	at San Francisco Barbarian Club*	Kingsburg High School Field; Kingsburg, CA	W 63–6	
November 26	Pacific (CA)	Fresno, CA	L 0–7	
December 5	at Saint Mary's	Ewing Field; San Francisco, CA	L 14–61	
*Non-conference game
