= 1923 Pacific Tigers football team =

American college football season

1923 Pacific Tigers football

CCC co-champion CCC North Division champion
- Conference: California Coast Conference
- North Division
- Record: 7–0 (4–0 CCC)
- Head coach: Erwin Righter (3rd season)

1923 California Coast Conference football standings
	Conf.					Overall
Team	W		L		T	W		L		T
Pacific (CA) +	4	–	0	–	0	7	–	0	–	0
Fresno State +	3	–	0	–	0	7	–	2	–	0
Chico State	2	–	1	–	0	5	–	2	–	2
Cal Poly	2	–	1	–	0	3	–	3	–	0
Bakersfield	1	–	1	–	0	4	–	4	–	0
Modesto	1	–	1	–	0	3	–	5	–	0
San Mateo	1	–	3	–	0	?	–	?	–	?
Sacramento	0	–	3	–	0	?	–	?	–	?
San Jose State	0	–	4	–	0	0	–	6	–	0
+ – Conference co-champions

The 1923 Pacific Tigers football team represented the College of the Pacific—now known as the University of the Pacific—in Stockton, California as a member of the California Coast Conference (CCC) during the 1923 college football season. The team was led by third-year head coach Erwin Righter and played home games at a field on campus in Stockton. Pacific compiled an overall record of 7–0 with a conference mark of 4–0. The Tigers dominated their opponents, outscoring them 171–12 for the season, and had five shutouts in the seven games.

At the end of the season, Pacific, as the champion of the CCC North Division was to meet the champion of the CCC South Division, Fresno State, for the conference championship. However, the two teams could not agree on a site and the game was never played.

== Schedule ==
Date	Opponent	Site	Result	Source
October 13	Sacramento*	College of the Pacific Field; Stockton, CA	W 28–6	
October 20	at Cal Poly	San Luis Obispo, CA	W 23–0	
October 27	San Mateo	College of the Pacific Field; Stockton, CA	W 26–0	
November 3	at San Jose State	Spartan Field; San Jose, CA (rivalry)	W 46–0	
November 10	at Modesto*	Modesto, CA	W 34–6	
November 17	at Cal Aggies*	Davis, CA	W 7–0	
November 23	Chico State	Spartan Field; San Jose, CA	W 7–0	
*Non-conference game

(Note: As a member of the North Division, Pacific's games against teams from the South Division (Sacramento Junior College & Modesto Junior College) did not count in the CCC standings.)
