= 1925 Santa Clara Broncos football team =

American college football season

1925 Santa Clara Broncos football
- Conference: Independent
- Record: 2–6
- Head coach: Adam Walsh (1st season)
- Home stadium: Mission Field

1925 Western college football independents records
	Conf.			Overall
Team	W	L	T	W		L		T
Hawaii		–		10	–	0	–	0
Tempe State		–		6	–	2	–	0
Loyola (CA)		–		4	–	2	–	0
New Mexico A&M		–		5	–	3	–	1
San Diego State		–		5	–	3	–	1
La Verne		–		5	–	4	–	0
Arizona		–		3	–	3	–	1
Santa Barbara State		–		3	–	4	–	1
Regis		–		2	–	3	–	0
New Mexico		–		2	–	4	–	1
St. Ignatius (CA)		–		2	–	4	–	1
Santa Clara		–		2	–	6	–	0
Humboldt State		–		1	–	3	–	0

The 1925 Santa Clara Broncos football team was an American football team that represented Santa Clara University as an independent during the 1925 college football season. In their first season under head coach Adam Walsh, the Broncos compiled a 2–6 record and were outscored by opponents by a total of 126 to 58.

== Schedule ==
Date	Opponent	Site	Result	Attendance	Source
September 26	at California	California Memorial Stadium; Berkeley, CA	L 0–28		
October 3	at Stanford	Stanford Stadium; Stanford, CA	L 3–20	13,000	
October 10	at Fresno State	Fresno, CA	W 6–0		
October 18	at Olympic Club	Ewing Field; San Francisco, CA	L 6–10		
October 31	at Nevada	Mackay Field; Reno, NV	W 20–7	c. 3,000	
November 7	at USC	Los Angeles Memorial Coliseum; Los Angeles, CA	L 9–29	> 20,000	
November 14	at Pacific (CA)	College of the Pacific Field; Stockton, CA	L 7–13		
November 26	at Saint Mary's	Ewing Field; San Francisco, CA	L 7–19	18,000	
