= 1923 Tempe Normal Owls football team =

American college football season

1923 Tempe Normal Owls football
- Conference: Independent
- Record: 4–2
- Head coach: Aaron McCreary (1st season)

1923 Western college football independents records
	Conf.			Overall
Team	W	L	T	W		L		T
New Mexico A&M		–		9	–	0	–	0
La Verne		–		7	–	2	–	1
Hawaii		–		5	–	1	–	2
Saint Mary's		–		5	–	3	–	1
Arizona		–		5	–	3	–	0
Tempe Normal		–		4	–	2	–	0
Gonzaga		–		4	–	3	–	0
Santa Clara		–		3	–	4	–	1
New Mexico		–		3	–	5	–	0
Nevada		–		2	–	3	–	3
Santa Barbara State		–		2	–	4	–	0
Cal Aggies		–		2	–	7	–	0

The 1923 Tempe Normal Owls football team was an American football team that represented Tempe Normal School (later renamed Arizona State University) as an independent during the 1923 college football season. In their first season under head coach Aaron McCreary, the Owls compiled a 4–2 record and outscored their opponents by a combined total of 152 to 102. John Turner was the team captain.

Coach McCreary graduated from Temple Normal School in 1915 and had thereafter been in charge of athletics at Tucson High School.

== Schedule ==
Date	Opponent	Site	Result	Source
October 6	at Salt River Indian School	Normal Field; Tempe, AZ	W 47–0	
October 13	at Salt River Indian School - 2nd Team	Phoenix, AZ	W 61–6	
October 20	Phoenix High School	Normal Field; Tempe, AZ	L 0–19	
November 3	at Phoenix College	Riverside Park; Phoenix, AZ	L 2–57	
November 10	Phoenix Indian School	Normal Field; Tempe, AZ	W 18–14	
November 29	at Mesa High School	Mesa, AZ	W 19–7	
