= 1923 San Jose State Spartans football team =

American college football season

1923 San Jose State Spartans football
- Conference: California Coast Conference
- Record: 0–6 (0–4 CCC)
- Head coach: Hovey C. McDonald (1st season)
- Home stadium: Spartan Field

1923 California Coast Conference football standings
	Conf.					Overall
Team	W		L		T	W		L		T
Pacific (CA) +	4	–	0	–	0	7	–	0	–	0
Fresno State +	3	–	0	–	0	7	–	2	–	0
Chico State	2	–	1	–	0	5	–	2	–	2
Cal Poly	2	–	1	–	0	3	–	3	–	0
Bakersfield	1	–	1	–	0	4	–	4	–	0
Modesto	1	–	1	–	0	3	–	5	–	0
San Mateo	1	–	3	–	0	?	–	?	–	?
Sacramento	0	–	3	–	0	?	–	?	–	?
San Jose State	0	–	4	–	0	0	–	6	–	0
+ – Conference co-champions

The 1923 San Jose State Spartans football team represented State Teachers College at San Jose (Note: San Jose State University was known as State Teachers College at San Jose from 1921 to 1934.) during the 1923 college football season.

San Jose State competed in the California Coast Conference (CCC). The team was led by first-year head coach Hovey C. McDonald and they played home games at Spartan Field in San Jose, California. The team finished the season winless, with a record of zero wins and six (0–6, 0–4 CCC). The Spartans only scored three points the entire season, while they gave up 262. That's an average score of 1–44, and included a shutout loss to the Stanford Freshman team of 0–79.

== Schedule ==
Date	Opponent	Site	Result	Source
October 6	at Modesto*	Modesto, CA	L 0–28	
October 20	at Stanford freshmen*	Stanford, CA	L 0–79	
October 27	Cal Poly	Spartan Field; San Jose, CA	L 0–14	
November 3	Pacific (CA)	Spartan Field; San Jose, CA (rivalry)	L 0–46	
November 10	at San Mateo	San Mateo, CA	L 0–45	
November 17	at Chico State	College Field; Chico, CA	L 3–50	
*Non-conference game
