= 1925 San Diego State Aztecs football team =

American college football season

1925 San Diego State Aztecs football
- Conference: Independent
- Record: 5–3–1
- Head coach: Charles E. Peterson (5th season)
- Home stadium: Balboa Stadium; College Field

1925 Western college football independents records
	Conf.			Overall
Team	W	L	T	W		L		T
Hawaii		–		10	–	0	–	0
Tempe State		–		6	–	2	–	0
Loyola (CA)		–		4	–	2	–	0
New Mexico A&M		–		5	–	3	–	1
San Diego State		–		5	–	3	–	1
La Verne		–		5	–	4	–	0
Arizona		–		3	–	3	–	1
Santa Barbara State		–		3	–	4	–	1
Regis		–		2	–	3	–	0
New Mexico		–		2	–	4	–	1
St. Ignatius (CA)		–		2	–	4	–	1
Santa Clara		–		2	–	6	–	0
Humboldt State		–		1	–	3	–	0

The 1925 San Diego State Aztecs football team represented San Diego State Teachers College (Note: San Diego State University was known as San Diego State Teachers College from 1924 to 1934.) during the 1925 college football season. San Diego State competed as an independent in 1925, after having been a member of the Southern California Junior College Conference (SCJCC) since they started playing in 1921. They became a member of the Southern California Intercollegiate Athletic Conference (SCIAC) in 1926.

The 1925 season was the first where San Diego State used the "Aztecs" nickname. The yearbook "Del Sudoeste" published at the end of the 1924–25 school year notes that January 6, 1925 was the date that "Berry, Schellbach and Osenburg christen college 'Aztecs' ".

The 1925 San Diego State team was led by head coach Charles E. Peterson in his fifth season as football coach of the Aztecs. (Note: San Diego State's Peterson Gym, which opened in 1961, was named after coach Peterson. At various times during his 37-year career with the Aztecs, Peterson was the athletic director, football coach, basketball coach, track coach, and Dean of Men.) They played home games at both Balboa Stadium and at a field on campus. The Aztecs finished the season with five wins, three losses and one tie (5–3–1). Overall, the team outscored its opponents 108–59 points for the season.

== Schedule ==
Date	Opponent	Site	Result	Attendance	Source
September 26	at Southern Branch	Moore Field; Los Angeles, CA	L 0–7		
October 3	at Redlands	Redlands Stadium (Note: This stadium is the predecessor to the current Ted Runner Stadium on the University of Redlands campus, which was opened for the 1968 season); Redlands, CA	W 10–0		
October 10	Caltech	Balboa Stadium; San Diego, CA	W 20–6		
October 24	Whittier	College Field; San Diego, CA	W 24–0	2,000	
October 31	Loyola (CA)	Balboa Stadium; San Diego, CA	L 9–13		
November 7	at Santa Barbara State	Bartlett Field; Santa Barbara, CA	W 10–0		
November 14	San Diego Marines (Note: The Marine Corps Recruit Depot (MCRD) in San Diego fielded a team that played against colleges and other military teams from 1922 to 1964.)	College Field; San Diego, CA	T 14–14		
November 21	California Christian	Balboa Stadium; San Diego, CA	W 14–6		
November 26	La Verne	Balboa Stadium; San Diego, CA	L 7–13		
