= 1923 Saint Mary's Saints football team =

American college football season

1923 Saint Mary's Saints football
- Conference: Independent
- Record: 5–3–1
- Head coach: Slip Madigan (3rd season)
- Home stadium: Ewing Field

1923 Western college football independents records
| | Conf. | | | Overall |
| Team | W | L | T | W | | L | | T |
|---|---|---|---|---|---|---|---|---|
| New Mexico A&M | | – | | 9 | – | 0 | – | 0 |
| La Verne | | – | | 7 | – | 2 | – | 1 |
| Hawaii | | – | | 5 | – | 1 | – | 2 |
| Saint Mary's | | – | | 5 | – | 3 | – | 1 |
| Arizona | | – | | 5 | – | 3 | – | 0 |
| Tempe Normal | | – | | 4 | – | 2 | – | 0 |
| Gonzaga | | – | | 4 | – | 3 | – | 0 |
| Santa Clara | | – | | 3 | – | 4 | – | 1 |
| New Mexico | | – | | 3 | – | 5 | – | 0 |
| Nevada | | – | | 2 | – | 3 | – | 3 |
| Santa Barbara State | | – | | 2 | – | 4 | – | 0 |
| Cal Aggies | | – | | 2 | – | 7 | – | 0 |

The 1923 Saint Mary's Saints football team was an American football team that represented Saint Mary's College of California during the 1923 college football season. In their third season under head coach Slip Madigan, the Gaels compiled a 5–3–1 record and outscored their opponents by a combined total of 212 to 111. The Gaels' victories included a 22–20 besting of Arizona. Their losses included a 49–0 defeat against undefeated national champion California.

== Schedule ==
| Date | Opponent | Site | Result | Attendance | Source |
|---|---|---|---|---|---|
| September 29 | at California | California Field; Berkeley, CA | L 0–49 | | |
| October 7 | Mare Island Sailors | St. Mary's grounds; Oakland, CA | W 48–0 | | |
| October 21 | vs. Olympic Club | Ewing Field; San Francisco, CA | L 6–9 | | |
| October 27 | at Arizona | Varsity field; Tucson, AZ | W 22–20 | | |
| November 3 | at Cal Aggies | Sacramento, CA | W 42–7 | | |
| November 10 | vs. Santa Clara | Ewing Field; San Francisco, CA | L 9–10 | | |
| November 17 | at Multnomah Athletic Club | Multnomah Field; Portland, OR | W 27–7 | | |
| November 29 | Nevada | Ewing Field; San Francisco, CA | T 10–10 | 7,500 | |
| | USS Tennessee | | W 48–0 | | |
