= 1923 Cal Poly Mustangs football team =

American college football season

1923 Cal Poly Mustangs football
- Conference: California Coast Conference
- Record: 3–3 (2–1 CCC)
- Head coach: Al Agosti (3rd season)

1923 California Coast Conference football standings
| | Conf. | | | | | Overall |
| Team | W | | L | | T | W | | L | | T |
|---|---|---|---|---|---|---|---|---|---|---|
| Pacific (CA) + | 4 | – | 0 | – | 0 | 7 | – | 0 | – | 0 |
| Fresno State + | 3 | – | 0 | – | 0 | 7 | – | 2 | – | 0 |
| Chico State | 2 | – | 1 | – | 0 | 5 | – | 2 | – | 2 |
| Cal Poly | 2 | – | 1 | – | 0 | 3 | – | 3 | – | 0 |
| Bakersfield | 1 | – | 1 | – | 0 | 4 | – | 4 | – | 0 |
| Modesto | 1 | – | 1 | – | 0 | 3 | – | 5 | – | 0 |
| San Mateo | 1 | – | 3 | – | 0 | ? | – | ? | – | ? |
| Sacramento | 0 | – | 3 | – | 0 | ? | – | ? | – | ? |
| San Jose State | 0 | – | 4 | – | 0 | 0 | – | 6 | – | 0 |
+ – Conference co-champions

The 1923 Cal Poly Mustangs football team represented California Polytechnic School—now known as California Polytechnic State University, San Luis Obispo—as a member of the California Coast Conference (CCC) during the 1923 college football season. Led by third-year head coach Al Agosti, Cal Poly compiled an overall record of 3–3 with a mark of 2–1 in conference play. The team was outscored by its opponents 82 to 36 for the season. The Mustangs played home games in San Luis Obispo, California.

Cal Poly was a two-year school until 1941.

== Schedule ==
| Date | Opponent | Site | Result |
|---|---|---|---|
| October 6 | Santa Barbara State* | San Luis Obispo, CA | L 6–20 |
| October 13 | at San Mateo | San Mateo, CA | W 9–6 |
| October 20 | Pacific (CA) | San Luis Obispo, CA | L 0–23 |
| October 27 | at San Jose State | Spartan Field; San Jose, CA | W 14–0 |
| November 3 | at Stanford freshmen* | Palo Alto, CA | L 0–33 |
| November 10 | at Santa Barbara State* | Bartlett Field; Santa Barbara, CA | W 7–0 |
*Non-conference game
