= 1925 Loyola Lions football team =

American college football season

1925 Loyola Lions football
- Conference: Independent
- Record: 4–2
- Head coach: Harold Hess (3rd season)
- Home stadium: Loyola Field

1925 Western college football independents records
	Conf.			Overall
Team	W	L	T	W		L		T
Hawaii		–		10	–	0	–	0
Tempe State		–		6	–	2	–	0
Loyola (CA)		–		4	–	2	–	0
New Mexico A&M		–		5	–	3	–	1
San Diego State		–		5	–	3	–	1
La Verne		–		5	–	4	–	0
Arizona		–		3	–	3	–	1
Santa Barbara State		–		3	–	4	–	1
Regis		–		2	–	3	–	0
New Mexico		–		2	–	4	–	1
St. Ignatius (CA)		–		2	–	4	–	1
Santa Clara		–		2	–	6	–	0
Humboldt State		–		1	–	3	–	0

The 1925 Loyola Lions football team was an American football team that represented Loyola College of Los Angeles (now known as Loyola Marymount University) as an independent during the 1925 college football season. In its third season under head coach William L. Driver, the team compiled a 4–2 record and outscored opponents by a total of 70 to 69.

== Schedule ==
Date	Opponent	Site	Result	Source
September 26	California Christian	Los Angeles, CA	W 25–0	
October 3	Santa Ana	Loyola Field; Los Angeles, CA	W 19–0	
October 10	Santa Barbara State	Loyola Field; Los Angeles, CA	W 6–0	
October 16	San Diego Army & Navy Academy	Los Angeles, CA	L 0–39	
October 31	at San Diego State	Balboa Stadium; San Diego, CA	W 13–9	
November 14	USC freshmen	Los Angeles Memorial Coliseum; Los Angeles, CA	L 7–21	
November 20	La Verne	Loyola Field; Los Angeles, CA	Cancelled	
