= 1925 Arizona Wildcats football team =

American college football season

1925 Arizona Wildcats football
- Conference: Independent
- Record: 3–3–1
- Head coach: Pop McKale (11th season)
- Captain: Charles H. Gilliland

1925 Western college football independents records
	Conf.			Overall
Team	W	L	T	W		L		T
Hawaii		–		10	–	0	–	0
Tempe State		–		6	–	2	–	0
Loyola (CA)		–		4	–	2	–	0
New Mexico A&M		–		5	–	3	–	1
San Diego State		–		5	–	3	–	1
La Verne		–		5	–	4	–	0
Arizona		–		3	–	3	–	1
Santa Barbara State		–		3	–	4	–	1
Regis		–		2	–	3	–	0
New Mexico		–		2	–	4	–	1
St. Ignatius (CA)		–		2	–	4	–	1
Santa Clara		–		2	–	6	–	0
Humboldt State		–		1	–	3	–	0

The 1925 Arizona Wildcats football team was an American football team that represented the University of Arizona as an independent during the 1925 college football season. In its 11th season under head coach Pop McKale, the team compiled a 3–3–1 record and was outscored by a total of 88 to 70. The team captain was Charles H. Gilliland.

== Schedule ==
Date	Opponent	Site	Result	Attendance	Source
October 10	Tempe State	Tucson, AZ (rivalry)	W 13–3		
October 16	Utah	Tucson, AZ	L 0–9		
October 24	at USC	Los Angeles Memorial Coliseum; Los Angeles, CA	L 0–56	17,000	
October 31	New Mexico A&M	Tucson, AZ	W 33–0		
November 7	at New Mexico	Albuquerque, NM (rivalry)	W 24–0		
November 14	at Texas	Memorial Stadium; Austin, TX	L 0–20		
November 26	Nevada^{†}	Tucson, AZ	T 0–0		
^{†}Homecoming
