= 1925 Pacific Tigers football team =

American college football season

1925 Pacific Tigers football
- Conference: Far Western Conference
- Record: 5–2 (1–2 FWC)
- Head coach: Erwin Righter (5th season)
- Home stadium: College of the Pacific Field

1925 Far Western Conference football standings
| | Conf. | | | | | Overall |
| Team | W | | L | | T | W | | L | | T |
|---|---|---|---|---|---|---|---|---|---|---|
| Saint Mary's $ | 3 | – | 0 | – | 0 | 8 | – | 2 | – | 0 |
| Nevada | 3 | – | 1 | – | 0 | 4 | – | 3 | – | 1 |
| Cal Aggies | 2 | – | 2 | – | 0 | 5 | – | 3 | – | 0 |
| Pacific (CA) | 1 | – | 2 | – | 0 | 5 | – | 2 | – | 0 |
| Fresno State | 0 | – | 4 | – | 0 | 2 | – | 6 | – | 1 |
$ – Conference champion

The 1925 Pacific Tigers football team represented the College of the Pacific—now known as the University of the Pacific—in Stockton, California as a member of the Far Western Conference (FWC) during the 1925 college football season. 1925 was the inaugural season of play for the FWC. Pacific had competed as an independent in 1924. The team was led by fifth-year head coach Erwin Righter and played home games at a field on campus in Stockton. Pacific compiled an overall record of 5–2 with a mark of 1–2 in conference play, placing fourth in the FWC. The Tigers outscored their opponents 71–46 for the season.

== Schedule ==
| Date | Opponent | Site | Result | Source |
|---|---|---|---|---|
| October 3 | Sacramento* | College of the Pacific Field; Stockton, CA | W 6–0 | |
| October 10 | Modesto* | College of the Pacific Field; Stockton, CA | W 13–6 | |
| October 17 | at Nevada | Mackay Stadium (Note: This stadium is the predecessor to the current Mackay Stadium, which was opened for the 1966 season.); Reno, NV | L 0–14 | |
| October 24 | Chico State* | College of the Pacific Field; Stockton, CA | W 25–7 | |
| November 7 | Cal Aggies | College of the Pacific Field; Stockton, CA | L 7–12 | |
| November 14 | Santa Clara*^{†} | College of the Pacific Field; Stockton, CA | W 13–7 | |
| November 26 | at Fresno State | Fresno, CA | W 7–0 | |
*Non-conference game; ^{†}Homecoming
