= 1923 Arizona Wildcats football team =

American college football season

1923 Arizona Wildcats football
- Conference: Independent
- Record: 5–3
- Head coach: Pop McKale (9th season)
- Captain: Marvin Carl Clark

1923 Western college football independents records
	Conf.			Overall
Team	W	L	T	W		L		T
New Mexico A&M		–		9	–	0	–	0
La Verne		–		7	–	2	–	1
Hawaii		–		5	–	1	–	2
Saint Mary's		–		5	–	3	–	1
Arizona		–		5	–	3	–	0
Tempe Normal		–		4	–	2	–	0
Gonzaga		–		4	–	3	–	0
Santa Clara		–		3	–	4	–	1
New Mexico		–		3	–	5	–	0
Nevada		–		2	–	3	–	3
Santa Barbara State		–		3	–	3	–	0
Cal Aggies		–		2	–	7	–	0

The 1923 Arizona Wildcats football team represented the University of Arizona as an independent during the 1923 college football season. In their ninth season under head coach Pop McKale, the Wildcats compiled a 5–3 record and outscored their opponents, 146 to 127. The team captain was Marvin Carl Clark.

== Schedule ==
Date	Opponent	Site	Result	Attendance	Source
October 6	Phoenix Indians	Varsity Field; Tucson, AZ	W 48–0		
October 13	Phoenix	Tucson, AZ	W 19–13		
October 20	Texas Mines	Tucson, AZ	W 12–7		
October 27	Saint Mary's	Varsity Field; Tucson, AZ	L 20–22		
November 3	at New Mexico	Varsity Field; Albuquerque, NM (rivalry)	W 14–7		
November 12	vs. Cal Aggies	Phoenix, AZ	L 7–9		
November 17	at USC	Los Angeles Memorial Coliseum; Los Angeles, CA	L 6–69	7,000–12,000	
November 29	Santa Clara	Tucson, AZ	W 20–0		
