= 1925 Nevada Wolf Pack football team =

American college football season

1925 Nevada Wolf Pack football
- Conference: Far Western Conference
- Record: 4–3–1 (3–1 FWC)
- Head coach: Buck Shaw (1st season)
- Home stadium: Mackay Field

1925 Far Western Conference football standings
| | Conf. | | | | | Overall |
| Team | W | | L | | T | W | | L | | T |
|---|---|---|---|---|---|---|---|---|---|---|
| Saint Mary's $ | 3 | – | 0 | – | 0 | 8 | – | 2 | – | 0 |
| Nevada | 3 | – | 1 | – | 0 | 4 | – | 3 | – | 1 |
| Cal Aggies | 2 | – | 2 | – | 0 | 5 | – | 3 | – | 0 |
| Pacific (CA) | 1 | – | 2 | – | 0 | 5 | – | 2 | – | 0 |
| Fresno State | 0 | – | 4 | – | 0 | 2 | – | 6 | – | 1 |
$ – Conference champion

The 1925 Nevada Wolf Pack football team was an American football team that represented the University of Nevada in the Far Western Conference (FWC) during the 1925 college football season. In its first season under head coach Buck Shaw, the team compiled a 4–3–1 record (3–1 against conference opponents), shut out four opponents, and finished second in the inaugural season of play in the Far Western Conference.

Bill Gutteron played quarterback for the Wolf Pack from 1923 to 1925. He later played quarterback in the National Football League (NFL) for the Los Angeles Buccaneers.

== Schedule ==
| Date | Opponent | Site | Result | Source |
|---|---|---|---|---|
| September 26 | St. Ignatius (CA)* | Mackay Field; Reno, NV | W 7–0 | |
| October 3 | at California* | California Memorial Stadium; Berkeley, CA | L 0–54 | |
| October 17 | Pacific (CA) | Mackay Field; Reno, NV | W 14–0 | |
| October 24 | at Saint Mary's | Ewing Field; San Francisco, CA | L 0–35 | |
| October 31 | Santa Clara* | Mackay Field; Reno, NV | L 7–20 | |
| November 7 | Fresno State | Mackay Field; Reno, NV | W 60–6 | |
| November 14 | at Cal Aggies | Moreing Field; Sacramento, CA | W 19–0 | |
| November 26 | at Arizona* | Tucson, AZ | T 0–0 | |
*Non-conference game
