= Eddie Kienholz =

American sports coach (1889–1974)

Biographical details
- Born: May 18, 1889; Bellingham, Minnesota, U.S.
- Died: October 1, 1974 (aged 85); Laguna Hills, California, U.S.
- Education: Connecticut

Playing career

Football
- 1910–1912: Washington State
- Position: Halfback

Coaching career (HC unless noted)

Football
- 1916–1922: Long Beach Poly HS (CA)
- 1923–1924: Santa Clara
- 1928–1931: Occidental

Basketball
- 1923–1925: Santa Clara
- 1926–1932: Occidental
- 1935–1938: Caltech

Baseball
- 1924: Santa Clara

Administrative career (AD unless noted)
- 1923–1925: Santa Clara

Head coaching record
- Overall: 26–22–3 (college football); 8–40 (college basketball, excluding Occidental); 8–8 (college baseball)

Accomplishments and honors

Championships
- Football; 2 SCC (1928–1929)

Edgar H. Kienholz (May 18, 1889 – October 1, 1974) was an American football, basketball, and baseball coach. He served as the head football coach at Santa Clara University from 1923 to 1924 and Occidental College from 1928 to 1931, compiling a career college football coaching record of 26–22–3. He was also Santa Clara's head basketball coach from 1923 to 1925 and head baseball coach in 1924. Kienholz was the head football coach at Long Beach Polytechnic High School from 1916 to 1922. In 1935, he was hired as the head basketball coach at the California Institute of Technology (Caltech).

Kienholz died on October 1, 1974, at this home in Laguna Hills, California.

== Head coaching record ==
=== College football ===
Year	Team	Overall	Conference	Standing	Bowl/playoffs
Santa Clara Missionites/Broncos (Independent) (1923–1924)
1923	Santa Clara	3–4–1			
1924	Santa Clara	3–5–1			
Santa Clara:		6–9–2			
Occidental Tigers (Southern California Conference) (1928–1931)
1928	Occidental	7–3	5–1	1st	
1929	Occidental	6–2	4–0	1st	
1930	Occidental	4–4	2–3	T–4th	
1931	Occidental	3–4–1	3–2	3rd	
Occidental:		20–13–1	14–6		
Total:		26–22–3			
