= 1925 Saint Mary's Saints football team =

American college football season

1925 Saint Mary's Saints football

Far Western champion
- Conference: Far Western Conference
- Record: 8–2 (3–0 FWC)
- Head coach: Slip Madigan (5th season)
- Home stadium: Ewing Field; California Memorial Stadium

1925 Far Western Conference football standings
	Conf.					Overall
Team	W		L		T	W		L		T
Saint Mary's $	3	–	0	–	0	8	–	2	–	0
Nevada	3	–	1	–	0	4	–	3	–	1
Cal Aggies	2	–	2	–	0	5	–	3	–	0
Pacific (CA)	1	–	2	–	0	5	–	2	–	0
Fresno State	0	–	4	–	0	2	–	6	–	1
$ – Conference champion

The 1925 Saint Mary's Saints football team was an American football team that represented Saint Mary's College of California during the 1925 college football season. In their fifth season under head coach Slip Madigan, the Gaels compiled an 8–2 record (3–0 against conference opponents), won the inaugural Far Western Conference championship, and outscored opponents by a combined total of 313 to 72.

Center Larry Bettencourt was selected by Norman E. Brown as a first-team player on the 1925 All-Pacific Coast football team; he was later inducted into the College Football Hall of Fame. Other key players on the team included "Ducky" Grant (captain), Jimmy Underhill (halfback/end), Red Strader (fullback), Dutch Conlan (quarterback), Boyd "Cowboy" Smith (halfback), and Pat O'Rourke (end).

== Schedule ==
Date	Time	Opponent	Site	Result	Attendance	Source
October 3		Whittier*	Ewing Field; San Francisco, CA	W 45–6		
October 10	2:30 p.m.	at Cal Aggies	Moreing Field; Sacramento, CA	W 32–13		
October 17		at California*	California Memorial Stadium; Berkeley, CA	L 0–6	70,000	
October 24		Nevada	Ewing Field; San Francisco, CA	W 35–0		
October 31		Southern Branch*	California Memorial Stadium; Berkeley, CA	W 28–0		
November 7		at Multnomah Athletic Club*	Multnomah Field; Portland, OR	W 41–7		
November 15		West Coast Army*	Ewing Field; San Francisco, CA	W 52–7		
November 26		Santa Clara*	Ewing Field; San Francisco, CA	W 19–7	18,000	
December 5		Fresno State	Ewing Field; San Francisco, CA	W 61–14		
December 12		at USC*	Los Angeles Memorial Coliseum; Los Angeles, CA	L 0–12	25,000	
*Non-conference game; All times are in Pacific time
