= 1925 Cal Aggies football team =

American college football season

1925 Cal Aggies football
- Conference: Far Western Conference
- Record: 5–3 (2–2 FWC)
- Head coach: William L. Driver (3rd season)
- Captain: Abe Lutz
- Home stadium: Moreing Field

1925 Far Western Conference football standings
	Conf.					Overall
Team	W		L		T	W		L		T
Saint Mary's $	3	–	0	–	0	8	–	2	–	0
Nevada	3	–	1	–	0	4	–	3	–	1
Cal Aggies	2	–	2	–	0	5	–	3	–	0
Pacific (CA)	1	–	2	–	0	5	–	2	–	0
Fresno State	0	–	4	–	0	2	–	6	–	1
$ – Conference champion

The 1925 Cal Aggies football team represented the Northern Branch of the College of Agriculture—now known as the University of California, Davis—as a member of the Far Western Conference (FWC) during the 1925 college football season. The team was known as the Cal Aggies, California Aggies, and sometimes the Cal Aggies Mustangs. Led by third-year head coach William L. Driver, the Cal Aggies compiled an overall record of 5–3 with a mark of 2–2 in conference play, placing third in the FWC. The team was outscored by its opponents 98 to 81 for the season. The Cal Aggies played home games at Moreing Field in Sacramento, California.

== Schedule ==
Date	Time	Opponent	Site	Result	Source
September 26	2:30 p.m.	Mare Island Naval Hospital Training School*	Davis, CA	W 18–0	
October 3		Olympic Club*	Golden Gate Park; San Francisco, CA	L 7–34	
October 10	2:30 p.m.	Saint Mary's	Moreing Field; Sacramento, CA	L 13–32	
October 17		St. Ignatius (CA)*	Davis, CA	W 3–0	
October 31		at Fresno State	Fresno, CA	W 6–0	
November 7		at Pacific (CA)	C.O.P. Field; Stockton, CA	W 12–7	
November 14		Nevada	Moreing Field; Sacramento, CA	L 0–19	
November 26		at Caltech*	Rose Bowl; Pasadena, CA	W 22–6	
*Non-conference game; All times are in Pacific time
