= 1923 Chico State Wildcats football team =

American college football season

1923 Chico State Wildcats football
- Conference: California Coast Conference
- North Division
- Record: 5–2–2 (2–1 CCC)
- Head coach: Art Acker (1st season)
- Home stadium: College Field

1923 California Coast Conference football standings
	Conf.					Overall
Team	W		L		T	W		L		T
Pacific (CA) +	4	–	0	–	0	7	–	0	–	0
Fresno State +	3	–	0	–	0	7	–	2	–	0
Chico State	2	–	1	–	0	5	–	2	–	2
Cal Poly	2	–	1	–	0	3	–	3	–	0
Bakersfield	1	–	1	–	0	4	–	4	–	0
Modesto	1	–	1	–	0	3	–	5	–	0
San Mateo	1	–	3	–	0	?	–	?	–	?
Sacramento	0	–	3	–	0	?	–	?	–	?
San Jose State	0	–	4	–	0	0	–	6	–	0
+ – Conference co-champions

The 1923 Chico State Wildcats football team represented Chico State Teachers College—now known as California State University, Chico—as a member of the California Coast Conference (CCC) during the 1923 college football season. Led by first-year head coach Art Acker, Chico State compiled an overall record of 5–2–2 with a mark of 2–1 in conference play. The team outscored its opponents 191 to 48 for the season and had three shutout victories. The Wildcats played home games at College Field in Chico, California.

== Schedule ==
Date	Opponent	Site	Result	Source
October 13	Preston Industrial School (Note: The Preston School of Industry was opened in 1894 to rehabilitate juvenile offenders. It remained open until 2011.)*	College Field; Chico, CA	W 27–0	
October 20	Cal Aggies*	College Field; Chico, CA	W 38–0	
October 27	Sacramento*	College Field; Chico, CA	W 26–0	
November 3	San Mateo	College Field; Chico, CA	W 26–7	
November 12	American Legion (Chico)*	College Field; Chico, CA	T 7–7	
November 17	San Jose State	College Field; Chico, CA	W 53–3	
November 23	at Pacific (CA)	Spartan Field; San Jose, CA	L 0–7	
November 29	Mare Island Marines*	College Field; Chico, CA	L 7–17	
January 1	American Legion (Chico)*	College Field; Chico, CA	T 7–7	
*Non-conference game
