= 1925 St. Ignatius Gray Fog football team =

American football team that represented St. Ignatius College

1925 St. Ignatius Gray Fog football
- Conference: Independent
- Record: 2–4–1
- Head coach: Jimmy Needles (3rd season)
- Home stadium: Ewing Field

1925 Western college football independents records
	Conf.			Overall
Team	W	L	T	W		L		T
Hawaii		–		10	–	0	–	0
Tempe State		–		6	–	2	–	0
Loyola (CA)		–		4	–	2	–	0
New Mexico A&M		–		5	–	3	–	1
San Diego State		–		5	–	3	–	1
La Verne		–		5	–	4	–	0
Arizona		–		3	–	3	–	1
Santa Barbara State		–		3	–	4	–	1
Regis		–		2	–	3	–	0
New Mexico		–		2	–	4	–	1
St. Ignatius (CA)		–		2	–	4	–	1
Santa Clara		–		2	–	6	–	0
Humboldt State		–		1	–	3	–	0

The 1925 St. Ignatius Gray Fog football team was an American football team that represented St. Ignatius College (later renamed the University of San Francisco) as an independent during the 1925 college football season. In its second season under head coach Jimmy Needles, the Gray Fog compiled a 2–4–1 record and was outscored by a total of 59 to 45. The team played its home games at Ewing Field in San Francisco.

== Schedule ==
Date	Opponent	Site	Result	Source
September 9	Olympic Club	Ewing Field; San Francisco, CA	L 6–20	
September 19	Ninth Army	Ewing Field; San Francisco, CA	T 6–6	
September 26	at Nevada	Mackay Field; Reno, NV	L 0–7	
October 4	Barbarian Club	Ewing Field; San Francisco, CA	W 19–0	
October 9	Chico State	Ewing Field; San Francisco, CA	L 0–23	
October 17	at Cal Aggies	Davis, CA	L 0–3	
October 25	Mare Island Naval Hospital	Ewing Field; San Francisco, CA	W 13–0	
