= 1923 Gonzaga Bulldogs football team =

American college football season

1923 Gonzaga Bulldogs football
- Conference: Independent
- Record: 4–3
- Head coach: Gus Dorais (4th season)
- Home stadium: Gonzaga Stadium

1923 Western college football independents records
	Conf.			Overall
Team	W	L	T	W		L		T
New Mexico A&M		–		9	–	0	–	0
La Verne		–		7	–	2	–	1
Hawaii		–		5	–	1	–	2
Saint Mary's		–		5	–	3	–	1
Arizona		–		5	–	3	–	0
Tempe Normal		–		4	–	2	–	0
Gonzaga		–		4	–	3	–	0
Santa Clara		–		3	–	4	–	1
New Mexico		–		3	–	5	–	0
Nevada		–		2	–	3	–	3
Santa Barbara State		–		2	–	4	–	0
Cal Aggies		–		2	–	7	–	0

The 1923 Gonzaga Bulldogs football team was an American football team that represented Gonzaga University during the 1923 college football season. In their fourth year under head coach Gus Dorais, the Bulldogs compiled a 4–3 record and outscored all opponents by a total of 119 to 64.

Halfback Hust Stockton starred for the 1923 team. The Los Angeles Times called him "one of the most brilliant football players ever developed on the Pacific Coast". Stockton played five years in the NFL and is the grandfather of NBA great John Stockton.

Gonzaga's football team under Dorais was sometimes referred to as "little Notre Dame".

The team traveled 2,500 miles to play on Thanksgiving Day at the University of Detroit's new Dinan Field. Dorais left Gonzaga after the 1924 season to become the head football coach at the University of Detroit.

== Schedule ==
Date	Opponent	Site	Result	Attendance	Source
October 6	Gonzaga alumni	Gonzaga Stadium; Spokane, WA	W 7–6		
October 13	Washington State	Gonzaga Stadium; Spokane, WA	W 27–14		
October 20	at Multnomah Athletic Club	Multnomah Field; Portland, OR	L 0–10		
October 27	at Montana	Dornblaser Field; Missoula, MT	W 25–2		
November 2	at Idaho	MacLean Field; Moscow, ID (rivalry)	L 0–13		
November 17	Whitman	Gonzaga Stadium; Spokane, WA	W 53–0		
November 29	at Detroit	Dinan Field; Detroit, MI	L 7–13	15,000	
