= 1925 Hawaii Deans football team =

American college football season

1925 Hawaii Deans football
- Conference: Independent
- Record: 10–0
- Head coach: Otto Klum (5th season)
- Home stadium: Moiliili Field

1925 Western college football independents records
	Conf.			Overall
Team	W	L	T	W		L		T
Hawaii		–		10	–	0	–	0
Tempe State		–		6	–	2	–	0
Loyola (CA)		–		4	–	2	–	0
New Mexico A&M		–		5	–	3	–	1
San Diego State		–		5	–	3	–	1
La Verne		–		5	–	4	–	0
Arizona		–		3	–	3	–	1
Santa Barbara State		–		3	–	4	–	1
Regis		–		2	–	3	–	0
New Mexico		–		2	–	4	–	1
St. Ignatius (CA)		–		2	–	4	–	1
Santa Clara		–		2	–	6	–	0
Humboldt State		–		1	–	3	–	0

The 1925 Hawaii Deans football team was an American football team that represented the University of Hawaii as an independent during the 1925 college football season. In its fifth season under head coach Otto Klum, the team compiled a perfect 10–0 record, shut out eight of ten opponents, and outscored opponents by a total of 421 to 17. The team's victories included games against Occidental (13–0), Colorado Agricultural (41–0), and Washington State (20–11).

The season was part of a 20-game winning streak by Hawaii that began with a January 1, 1924, victory over the 1923 Oregon Agricultural Aggies football team and ended on October 2, 1926, with a victory over a United States Army field artillery unit. The undefeated 1924 and 1925 Hawaii teams are known as the "Wonder Teams". Over the course of 18 games during the 1924 and 1925 seasons, the Wonder Teams outscored opponents by a total of 606 to 29. The 1924 and 1925 teams were inducted as a group into the University of Hawaii Circle of Honor in 1955.

Key players on the 1924 and 1925 Wonder Teams included Bill "Doggie" Wise, Johnny Morse, Eddie Kane Fernandez, and Theodore "Pump" Searle, sometimes referred to as the Four Horsemen of Mānoa".

== Schedule ==
Date	Opponent	Site	Result	Attendance	Source
September 26	11th Field Artillery	Moiliili Field; Honolulu, Territory of Hawaii	W 68–0		
September 26	27th Infantry	Moiliili Field; Honolulu, Territory of Hawaii	W 20–0		
October 3	Hawaii National Guard	Moiliili Field; Honolulu, Territory of Hawaii	W 86–0		
October 10	Healani Athletic Club	Moiliili Field; Honolulu, Territory of Hawaii	W 74–0		
October 24	Palama team	Moiliili Field; Honolulu, Territory of Hawaii	W 42–0		
October 31	Pearl Harbor Navy	Moiliili Field; Honolulu, Territory of Hawaii	W 43–0		
November 11	Honolulu Town Team	Moiliili Field; Honolulu, Territory of Hawaii	W 14–6		
November 26	at Occidental	Los Angeles Memorial Coliseum; Los Angeles, CA	W 13–0	35,000	
December 12	Colorado Agricultural	Moiliili Field; Honolulu, Territory of Hawaii	W 41–0		
January 1, 1926	Washington State	Moiliili Field; Honolulu, Territory of Hawaii	W 20–11	10,000	
