= 1923 New Mexico Lobos football team =

American college football season

1923 New Mexico Lobos football
- Conference: Independent
- Record: 3–5
- Head coach: Roy W. Johnson (4th season)
- Captain: Ogle Jones
- Home stadium: Varsity field

1923 Western college football independents records
	Conf.			Overall
Team	W	L	T	W		L		T
New Mexico A&M		–		9	–	0	–	0
La Verne		–		7	–	2	–	1
Hawaii		–		5	–	1	–	2
Saint Mary's		–		5	–	3	–	1
Arizona		–		5	–	3	–	0
Tempe Normal		–		4	–	2	–	0
Gonzaga		–		4	–	3	–	0
Santa Clara		–		3	–	4	–	1
New Mexico		–		3	–	5	–	0
Nevada		–		2	–	3	–	3
Santa Barbara State		–		3	–	3	–	0
Cal Aggies		–		2	–	7	–	0

The 1923 New Mexico Lobos football team represented the University of New Mexico as an independent during the 1923 college football season. In their fourth season under head coach Roy W. Johnson, the Lobos compiled a 3–5 record.

Halfback Ogle Jones was the team captain. Jones played for the Lobos from 1921 to 1924 and was recognized in 1949 as "the greatest football player who ever performed for the honor and glory of the University of New Mexico."

The team's tallies of 82 points against New Mexico Normal on September 29 and 75 points against Montezuma College on October 15 ranked at the time as second and third highest point totals in school history – trailing only the 108 points scored in 1916 against Arizona State Teachers College at Flagstaff.

== Schedule ==
Date	Opponent	Site	Result	Source
September 29	New Mexico Normal	Varsity field; Albuquerque, NM	W 82–7	
October 6	at Denver	Denver, CO	L 7–10	
October 15	Montezuma College	Varsity field; Albuquerque, NM	W 75–6	
October 20	at West Texas State	Canyon, TX	L 8–21	
October 27	at Texas Mines	El Paso High School stadium; El Paso, TX	W 3–0	
November 3	Arizona	Varsity field; Albuquerque, NM (rivalry)	L 7–14	
November 17	New Mexico A&M	Varsity field; Albuquerque, NM (rivalry)	L 3–6	
November 29	Montana State	Varsity field; Albuquerque, NM	L 7–34	
