= 1923 Santa Clara Missionites football team =

American college football season

1923 Santa Clara Missionites football
- Conference: Independent
- Record: 3–4–1
- Head coach: Eddie Kienholz (1st season)
- Home stadium: Mission Field

1923 Western college football independents records
	Conf.			Overall
Team	W	L	T	W		L		T
New Mexico A&M		–		9	–	0	–	0
La Verne		–		7	–	2	–	1
Hawaii		–		5	–	1	–	2
Saint Mary's		–		5	–	3	–	1
Arizona		–		5	–	3	–	0
Tempe Normal		–		4	–	2	–	0
Gonzaga		–		4	–	3	–	0
Santa Clara		–		3	–	4	–	1
New Mexico		–		3	–	5	–	0
Nevada		–		2	–	3	–	3
Santa Barbara State		–		3	–	3	–	0
Cal Aggies		–		2	–	7	–	0

The 1923 Santa Clara Missionites football team was an American football team that represented Santa Clara University as an independent during the 1923 college football season. In their first season under head coach Eddie Kienholz, the Missionites compiled a 3–4–1 record.

== Schedule ==
Date	Opponent	Site	Result	Attendance	Source
September 16	Mare Island Sailors	Mission Field; Santa Clara, CA	W 13–7		
September 22	at Cal Aggies	Davis, CA	W 7–6		
October 6	at California	California Field; Berkeley, CA	L 0–48	10,000	
October 13	at Stanford	Stanford Stadium; Stanford, CA	L 6–55		
October 27	at Nevada	Mackay Field; Reno, NV	T 7–7		
November 10	vs. Saint Mary's	Ewing Field; San Francisco, CA	W 10–9		
November 18	vs. Olympic Club	Ewing Field; San Francisco, CA	L 0–14		
November 29	at Arizona	University Field; Tucson, AZ	L 0–20		
