= 1925 New Mexico Lobos football team =

American college football season

1925 New Mexico Lobos football

New Mexico champion
- Conference: Independent
- Record: 2–4–1
- Head coach: Roy W. Johnson (6th season)
- Captain: Hearst Coen
- Home stadium: Varsity field

1925 Western college football independents records
| | Conf. | | | Overall |
| Team | W | L | T | W | | L | | T |
|---|---|---|---|---|---|---|---|---|
| Hawaii | | – | | 10 | – | 0 | – | 0 |
| Tempe State | | – | | 6 | – | 2 | – | 0 |
| Loyola (CA) | | – | | 4 | – | 2 | – | 0 |
| New Mexico A&M | | – | | 5 | – | 3 | – | 1 |
| San Diego State | | – | | 5 | – | 3 | – | 1 |
| La Verne | | – | | 5 | – | 4 | – | 0 |
| Arizona | | – | | 3 | – | 3 | – | 1 |
| Santa Barbara State | | – | | 3 | – | 4 | – | 1 |
| Regis | | – | | 2 | – | 3 | – | 0 |
| New Mexico | | – | | 2 | – | 4 | – | 1 |
| St. Ignatius (CA) | | – | | 2 | – | 4 | – | 1 |
| Santa Clara | | – | | 2 | – | 6 | – | 0 |
| Humboldt State | | – | | 1 | – | 3 | – | 0 |

The 1925 New Mexico Lobos football team was an American football team that represented the University of New Mexico as an independent during the 1925 college football season. In its sixth season under head coach Roy W. Johnson, the team compiled a 2–4–1 record. Hearst Coen was the team captain.

== Schedule ==
| Date | Opponent | Site | Result | Source |
|---|---|---|---|---|
| October 3 | at Colorado College | Colorado Springs, CO | T 0–0 | |
| October 10 | Montezuma College | University Field; Albuquerque, NM | W 10–0 | |
| October 17 | at West Texas State | Canyon, TX | L 7–9 | |
| October 24 | at Texas Mines | Dudley Field; El Paso, TX | L 2–19 | |
| November 7 | Arizona^{†} | University Field; Albuquerque, NM (rivalry) | L 0–24 | |
| November 21 | New Mexico A&M | University Field; Albuquerque, NM (rivalry) | W 20–9 | |
| November 26 | Western State (CO) | University Field; Albuquerque, NM | L 13–16 | |
^{†}Homecoming
