= 1923 Hawaii Deans football team =

American college football season

1923 Hawaii Deans football
- Conference: Independent
- Record: 5–1–2
- Head coach: Otto Klum (3rd season)
- Home stadium: Moiliili Field

1923 Western college football independents records
| | Conf. | | | Overall |
| Team | W | L | T | W | | L | | T |
|---|---|---|---|---|---|---|---|---|
| New Mexico A&M | | – | | 9 | – | 0 | – | 0 |
| La Verne | | – | | 7 | – | 2 | – | 1 |
| Hawaii | | – | | 5 | – | 1 | – | 2 |
| Saint Mary's | | – | | 5 | – | 3 | – | 1 |
| Arizona | | – | | 5 | – | 3 | – | 0 |
| Tempe Normal | | – | | 4 | – | 2 | – | 0 |
| Gonzaga | | – | | 4 | – | 3 | – | 0 |
| Santa Clara | | – | | 3 | – | 4 | – | 1 |
| New Mexico | | – | | 3 | – | 5 | – | 0 |
| Nevada | | – | | 2 | – | 3 | – | 3 |
| Santa Barbara State | | – | | 2 | – | 4 | – | 0 |
| Cal Aggies | | – | | 2 | – | 7 | – | 0 |

The 1923 Hawaii Deans football team was an American football team that represented the University of Hawaii as an independent during the 1923 college football season. In its third season under head coach Otto Klum, the team compiled a 5–1–2 record and outscored opponents by a total of 172 to 50. The season concluded with a 7 to 0 victory over the 1923 Oregon Agricultural Aggies football team in the Hawaii Holiday Classic on January 1, 1924.

== Schedule ==
| Date | Opponent | Site | Result | Attendance | Source |
|---|---|---|---|---|---|
| September 29 | Coast Defense | Moiliili Field; Honolulu, Territory of Hawaii | W 83–6 | | |
| October 6 | Honolulu Town Team | Moiliili Field; Honolulu, Territory of Hawaii | W 13–0 | | |
| October 20 | Hawaii Army | Moiliili Field; Honolulu, Territory of Hawaii | W 27–7 | | |
| November 3 | National Guard | Moiliili Field; Honolulu, Territory of Hawaii | W 10–0 | | |
| November 12 | Pearl Harbor Navy | Moiliili Field; Honolulu, Territory of Hawaii | T 19–19 | | |
| November 29 | at Pomona | Rose Bowl; Pasadena, CA | L 7–14 | 7,000 | |
| December 18 | Honolulu Town Team | Moiliili Field; Honolulu, Territory of Hawaii | T 6–6 | | |
| January 1, 1924 | Oregon Agricultural | Moiliili Field; Honolulu, Territory of Hawaii (Hawaii Holiday Classic) | W 7–0 | | |
