= 1925 New Mexico A&M Aggies football team =

American college football season

1925 New Mexico A&M Aggies football
- Conference: Independent
- Record: 5–3–1
- Head coach: R. R. Brown (3rd season)
- Home stadium: Miller Field

1925 Western college football independents records
	Conf.			Overall
Team	W	L	T	W		L		T
Hawaii		–		10	–	0	–	0
Tempe State		–		6	–	2	–	0
Loyola (CA)		–		4	–	2	–	0
New Mexico A&M		–		5	–	3	–	1
San Diego State		–		5	–	3	–	1
La Verne		–		5	–	4	–	0
Arizona		–		3	–	3	–	1
Santa Barbara State		–		3	–	4	–	1
Regis		–		2	–	3	–	0
New Mexico		–		2	–	4	–	1
St. Ignatius (CA)		–		2	–	4	–	1
Santa Clara		–		2	–	6	–	0
Humboldt State		–		1	–	3	–	0

The 1925 New Mexico A&M Aggies football team was an American football team that represented New Mexico College of Agriculture and Mechanical Arts (now known as New Mexico State University) during the 1925 college football season. In their third year under head coach R. R. Brown, the Aggies compiled a 5–3–1 record and shut out four opponents. The team played home games on Miller Field, sometimes also referred to as College Field.

== Schedule ==
Date	Opponent	Site	Result	Source
September 26	Las Cruces High School	Las Cruces, NM	W 44–0	
October 3	at El Paso High School	El Paso, TX	W 7–3	
October 10	Beaumont Army Hospital	Las Cruces, NM	W 40–0	
October 17	New Mexico Teachers	Las Cruces, NM	W 14–0	
October 24	Sul Ross	Las Cruces, NM	L 12–13	
October 31	at Arizona	Tucson, AZ	L 0–33	
November 7	at Texas Mines	Dudley Field; El Paso, TX (rivalry)	T 6–6	
November 21	at New Mexico	University Field; Albuquerque, NM (rivalry)	L 9–20	
November 27	New Mexico Military	Las Cruces, NM	W 19–0	
