= 1923 Fresno State Bulldogs football team =

American college football season

1923 Fresno State Bulldogs football

CCC co-champion
- Conference: California Coast Conference
- Record: 7–2 (3–0 CCC)
- Head coach: Arthur W. Jones (3rd season)

1923 California Coast Conference football standings
| | Conf. | | | | | Overall |
| Team | W | | L | | T | W | | L | | T |
|---|---|---|---|---|---|---|---|---|---|---|
| Pacific (CA) + | 4 | – | 0 | – | 0 | 7 | – | 0 | – | 0 |
| Fresno State + | 3 | – | 0 | – | 0 | 7 | – | 2 | – | 0 |
| Chico State | 2 | – | 1 | – | 0 | 5 | – | 2 | – | 2 |
| Cal Poly | 2 | – | 1 | – | 0 | 3 | – | 3 | – | 0 |
| Bakersfield | 1 | – | 1 | – | 0 | 4 | – | 4 | – | 0 |
| Modesto | 1 | – | 1 | – | 0 | 3 | – | 5 | – | 0 |
| San Mateo | 1 | – | 3 | – | 0 | ? | – | ? | – | ? |
| Sacramento | 0 | – | 3 | – | 0 | ? | – | ? | – | ? |
| San Jose State | 0 | – | 4 | – | 0 | 0 | – | 6 | – | 0 |
+ – Conference co-champions

The 1923 Fresno State Bulldogs football team represented Fresno State Normal School—now known as California State University, Fresno—during the 1923 college football season.

Fresno State competed in the California Coast Conference (CCC) from 1922 to 1924. The 1923 team was led by head coach Arthur W. Jones in his third year at the helm. They finished as co-champion of the CCC, with a record of seven wins and two losses (7–2, 3–0 CCC). The Bulldogs outscored their opponents 211–108 for the season.

At the end of the season, the champion of the CCC North Division (Pacific) was to meet the champion of the CCC South Division (Fresno State) for the conference championship. However, the two teams could not agree on a site and the game was never played.

== Schedule ==
| Date | Opponent | Site | Result | Source |
|---|---|---|---|---|
| October 6 | Reedley High School* | Fresno, CA | W 39–0 | |
| October 13 ? | Caruthers American Legion (CA)* | Fresno, CA ? | W 39–0 | |
| October 20 | Sacramento | Fresno, CA | W 53–18 | |
| October 27 | at Cal Aggies* | Davis, CA | W 26–14 | |
| November 3 | at Modesto | Modesto, CA | W 7–6 | |
| November 10 | at Nevada* | Mackay Stadium (Note: This stadium is the predecessor to the current Mackay Stadium, which was opened for the 1966 season.); Reno, NV | L 3–46 | |
| November 17 | Redlands* | Fresno, CA | W 10–6 | |
| November 24 | Bakersfield | Fresno, CA | W 32–6 | |
| November 29 | at San Diego State* | Balboa Stadium; San Diego, CA (rivalry) | L 2–12 | |
*Non-conference game
