= Bellingham, Minnesota =

City in Minnesota, United States

Bellingham
- City
- Location of Bellingham, Minnesota
- Coordinates: 45°08′11″N 96°17′03″W
- Country: United States
- State: Minnesota
- County: Lac qui Parle
- Named for: Robert Bellingham

Area
  - Total: 0.39 sq mi (1.00 km^{2})
  - Land: 0.39 sq mi (1.00 km^{2})
  - Water: 0 sq mi (0.00 km^{2})
- Elevation: 1,043 ft (318 m)

Population (2020)
  - Total: 148
  - Density: 382.2/sq mi (147.56/km^{2})
- Time zone: UTC-6 (Central (CST))
  - Summer (DST): UTC-5 (CDT)
- ZIP code: 56212
- Area code: 320
- FIPS code: 27-04960
- GNIS feature ID: 2394122
- Website: bellinghammn.com

Bellingham is a city in Lac qui Parle County, Minnesota, United States. The population was 148 at the 2020 census.

== History ==
Bellingham was platted in 1887, and named for Robert Bellingham, the owner of the original town site. A post office has been in operation at Bellingham since 1887.

== Geography ==
According to the United States Census Bureau, the city has a total area of 0.40 square miles (1.04 km^{2}), all land.

== Demographics ==
Historical population
Census	Pop.	Note	%±
1890	166		—
1900	380		128.9%
1910	359		−5.5%
1920	405		12.8%
1930	375		−7.4%
1940	456		21.6%
1950	388		−14.9%
1960	327		−15.7%
1970	263		−19.6%
1980	290		10.3%
1990	247		−14.8%
2000	205		−17.0%
2010	168		−18.0%
2020	148		−11.9%
U.S. Decennial Census

=== 2010 census ===
As of the census of 2010, there were 168 people, 82 households, and 52 families residing in the city. The population density was 420.0 inhabitants per square mile (162.2/km^{2}). There were 106 housing units at an average density of 265.0 per square mile (102.3/km^{2}). The racial makeup of the city was 100.0% White. Hispanic or Latino of any race were 1.2% of the population.

There were 82 households, of which 18.3% had children under the age of 18 living with them, 50.0% were married couples living together, 4.9% had a female householder with no husband present, 8.5% had a male householder with no wife present, and 36.6% were non-families. 31.7% of all households were made up of individuals, and 15.9% had someone living alone who was 65 years of age or older. The average household size was 2.05 and the average family size was 2.50.

The median age in the city was 53.8 years. 16.7% of residents were under the age of 18; 4.9% were between the ages of 18 and 24; 13.8% were from 25 to 44; 35.6% were from 45 to 64; and 29.2% were 65 years of age or older. The gender makeup of the city was 51.8% male and 48.2% female.

=== 2000 census ===
As of the census of 2000, there were 205 people, 93 households, and 58 families residing in the city. The population density was 512.8 inhabitants per square mile (198.0/km^{2}). There were 112 housing units at an average density of 280.1 per square mile (108.1/km^{2}). The racial makeup of the city was 100.00% White. Hispanic or Latino of any race were 0.49% of the population.

There were 93 households, out of which 23.7% had children under the age of 18 living with them, 57.0% were married couples living together, 4.3% had a female householder with no husband present, and 36.6% were non-families. 31.2% of all households were made up of individuals, and 17.2% had someone living alone who was 65 years of age or older. The average household size was 2.20 and the average family size was 2.75.

In the city, the population was spread out, with 21.5% under the age of 18, 6.3% from 18 to 24, 18.5% from 25 to 44, 23.4% from 45 to 64, and 30.2% who were 65 years of age or older. The median age was 48 years. For every 100 females, there were 107.1 males. For every 100 females age 18 and over, there were 109.1 males.

The median income for a household in the city was $27,083, and the median income for a family was $36,250. Males had a median income of $31,250 versus $17,250 for females. The per capita income for the city was $15,888. About 6.7% of families and 13.5% of the population were below the poverty line, including 8.9% of those under the age of eighteen and 16.4% of those 65 or over.

== Notable people ==
- Glen H. Anderson, former Minnesotan politician who served in the Minnesota House of Representatives from 1973 – 1990.
- Eddie Kienholz, college football, basketball, and baseball coach.

== Education ==
Bellingham is within the Ortonville School District. In 2009 the Bellingham School District merged into the Ortonville district. Under Minnesota law it was a consolidation.
