= Otho J. Gilliland =

Biographical details
- Born: June 19, 1892
- Died: April 23, 1948 (aged 55)

Coaching career (HC unless noted)

Football
- 1922–1925: Santa Barbara State

Basketball
- 1922–1927: Santa Barbara State

Head coaching record
- Overall: 4–9–1 (football)

Otho James Gilliland (June 19, 1892 – April 23, 1948) was an American football and basketball coach and a high school principal. He served as the head football coach (1922–1925) and head basketball coach (1922–1927) at Santa Barbara State College—now known as the University of California, Santa Barbara. During the 1914–15 academic year, Gilliland worked in the Botany Department at Stanford University. He served as the principal of Lompoc High School in Lompoc, California during the 1921–22 academic year.
