= Hovey C. McDonald =

American sports coach (1888–1941)

Biographical details
- Born: May 9, 1888; Houston, Missouri, U.S.
- Died: June 12, 1941 (aged 53); San Jose, California, U.S.

Coaching career (HC unless noted)

Football
- 1923: San Jose State

Basketball
- 1924–1935: San Jose State

Wrestling
- 1918: Oregon State

Soccer
- 1936–1940: San Jose State

Head coaching record
- Overall: 0–6 (football); 142–81 (basketball); 26–15–9 (soccer)

Hovey Clyde McDonald (May 9, 1888 – June 12, 1941) was an American football, basketball, wrestling, and soccer coach. He served as the head football coach (1923) and head basketball coach (1924–1935) at San Jose State University in San Jose, California. McDonald was also the director of men's physical education at San Jose State from 1927 to 1940. He died of a heart attack at the age of 53, on June 12, 1941.

== Head coaching record ==
=== Football ===
Year	Team	Overall	Conference	Standing	Bowl/playoffs
San Jose State Spartans (California Coast Conference) (1923)
1923	San Jose State	0–6	0–4	9th	
San Jose State:		0–6	0–4		
Total:		0–6			

=== Basketball ===
Record table
Season	Team	Overall	Conference	Standing	Postseason
San Jose State Spartans (California Coast Conference) (1924–1928)
1923–24	San Jose State	6–7			
1924–25	San Jose State	18–3			
1925–26	San Jose State	10–9			
1926–27	San Jose State	14–7			
1927–28	San Jose State	22–4			
San Jose State Spartans (Far West Conference) (1928–1935)
1928–29	San Jose State	13–5			
1929–30	San Jose State	9–7			
1930–31	San Jose State	14–3			
1931–32	San Jose State	8–10			
1932–33	San Jose State	5–13			
1933–34	San Jose State	13–6			
1934–35	San Jose State	9–8			
San Jose State:		143–80 (.641)			
Total:		143–80 (.641)			
National champion Postseason invitational champion Conference regular season champion Conference regular season and conference tournament champion Division regular season champion Division regular season and conference tournament champion Conference tournament champion

=== Soccer ===
Record table
Season	Team	Overall	Conference	Standing	Postseason
San Jose State Spartans (California Intercollegiate Soccer Conference) (1936–1939)
1936	San Jose State	2–7–0			
1937	San Jose State	3–5–3			
1938	San Jose State	10–1–4			
1939	San Jose State	1–2–2			
San Jose State:		26–15–9 (.610)			
Total:		26–15–9 (.610)			
National champion Postseason invitational champion Conference regular season champion Conference regular season and conference tournament champion Division regular season champion Division regular season and conference tournament champion Conference tournament champion
