= 1926 Northern Arizona Lumberjacks football team =

American college football season

1926 Northern Arizona Lumberjacks football
- Conference: Independent
- Record: 5–2
- Head coach: Emzy Harvey Lynch (1st season)
- Home stadium: McMullen Field

1926 Western college football independents records
| | Conf. | | | Overall |
| Team | W | L | T | W | | L | | T |
|---|---|---|---|---|---|---|---|---|
| Loyola (CA) | | – | | 6 | – | 0 | – | 2 |
| Arizona | | – | | 5 | – | 1 | – | 1 |
| Regis | | – | | 6 | – | 2 | – | 0 |
| Tempe State | | – | | 4 | – | 1 | – | 1 |
| Gonzaga | | – | | 5 | – | 2 | – | 1 |
| New Mexico | | – | | 4 | – | 2 | – | 1 |
| New Mexico A&M | | – | | 5 | – | 3 | – | 1 |
| Hawaii | | – | | 5 | – | 4 | – | 0 |
| Santa Clara | | – | | 5 | – | 4 | – | 0 |
| St. Ignatius (CA) | | – | | 2 | – | 3 | – | 3 |
| Santa Barbara State | | – | | 2 | – | 4 | – | 0 |

The 1926 Northern Arizona Lumberjacks football team was an American football team that represented Northern Arizona Teachers College (now known as Northern Arizona University) as an independent during the 1926 college football season. The Lumberjacks compiled a 5–2 record, shut out five of seven opponents, and outscored all opponents by a total of 139 to 55.

Emzy Harvey Lynch was the team's head coach. The 1926 season was his first and only as head coach.

The team played its home games at McMullen Field in Flagstaff, Arizona.

== Schedule ==
| Date | Opponent | Site | Result | Source |
|---|---|---|---|---|
| October 2 | Smoki Athletic Club | Flagstaff, AZ | W 40–0 | |
| October 9 | Gila College | Flagstaff, AZ | W 19–0 | |
| October 15 | at Phoenix Junior College^{†} | Phoenix, AZ | W 32–0 | |
| October 30 | Phoenix Indians | McMullen Field; Flagstaff, AZ | W 7–0 | |
| November 6 | at Loyola (CA) | West 16th & Cambridge Sts.; Los Angeles, CA | L 7–27 | |
| November 12 | at Tempe State | Tempe, AZ | L 0–14 | |
| November 20 | Montezuma College | McMullen Field; Flagstaff, AZ | W 34–14 | |
^{†}Homecoming
