= 1926 Loyola Lions football team =

American college football season

1926 Loyola Lions football
- Conference: Independent
- Record: 6–0–2
- Head coach: Harold Hess (4th season)
- Home stadium: Loyola Field

1926 Western college football independents records
	Conf.			Overall
Team	W	L	T	W		L		T
Loyola (CA)		–		6	–	0	–	2
Arizona		–		5	–	1	–	1
Regis		–		6	–	2	–	0
Tempe State		–		4	–	1	–	1
Gonzaga		–		5	–	2	–	1
New Mexico		–		4	–	2	–	1
New Mexico A&M		–		5	–	3	–	1
Hawaii		–		5	–	4	–	0
Santa Clara		–		5	–	4	–	0
St. Ignatius (CA)		–		2	–	3	–	3
Santa Barbara State		–		2	–	4	–	0

The 1926 Loyola Lions football team was an American football team that represented Loyola College of Los Angeles (now known as Loyola Marymount University) as an independent during the 1926 college football season. In their fourth season under head coach William L. Driver, the Lions compiled a 6–0–2 record.

== Schedule ==
Date	Opponent	Site	Result	Attendance	Source
September 25	Occidental	Patterson Field; Los Angeles, CA	T 7–7	3,000	
October 3	Redlands	Los Angeles, CA	W 14–0		
October 9	at USC freshmen	Los Angeles Memorial Coliseum; Los Angeles, CA	W 13–10		
October 16	Santa Barbara State	Loyola Field; Los Angeles, CA	W 28–0		
October 24	Santa Ana	Los Angeles, CA	W 34–0		
November 6	Northern Arizona	Los Angeles, CA	W 27–7	1,000	
November 13	California Christian	Moore Field; Los Angeles, CA	W 28–0		
November 25	at St. Ignatius (CA)	San Francisco, CA	T 6–6		
