= 1926 Saint Mary's Gaels football team =

American college football season

1926 Saint Mary's Gaels football

FWC champion
- Conference: Far Western Conference
- Record: 9–0–1 (4–0 FWC)
- Head coach: Slip Madigan (6th season)
- Home stadium: Ewing Field; Kezar Stadium

1926 Far Western Conference football standings
	Conf.					Overall
Team	W		L		T	W		L		T
Saint Mary's $	4	–	0	–	0	9	–	0	–	1
Nevada	3	–	1	–	0	4	–	4	–	0
Fresno State	1	–	2	–	1	5	–	3	–	1
Pacific (CA)	1	–	2	–	1	5	–	3	–	1
Cal Aggies	0	–	4	–	0	2	–	6	–	1
$ – Conference champion

The 1926 Saint Mary's Gaels football team was an American football team that represented Saint Mary's College of California during the 1926 college football season. In their sixth season under head coach Slip Madigan, the Gaels compiled a 9–0–1 record, shut out six opponents, won the Far Western Conference championship, and outscored all opponents by a combined total of 242 to 27. The Gaels' victories including a 26-7 besting of California. The lone setback was a scoreless tie with Gonzaga.

Two Saint Mary's players were selected by the Associated Press as members of the 1926 All-Pacific Coast football team: center Larry Bettencourt as a first-team player and halfback Jimmy Underhill as a second-team player. Bettencourt was later inducted into the College Football Hall of Fame.

== Schedule ==
photographs from the November 27, 1926 game against the Santa Clara Broncos

Date	Opponent	Site	Result	Attendance	Source
September 26	West Coast Army*	Ewing Field; San Francisco, CA	W 34–6	12,000	
October 3	St. Ignatius (CA)*	Ewing Field; San Francisco, CA	W 38–0	10,000	
October 9	at California*	California Memorial Stadium; Berkeley, CA	W 26–7	67,000	
October 16	Cal Aggies	Ewing Field; San Francisco, CA	W 20–7		
October 23	at Nevada	Mackay Field; Reno, NV	W 13–0		
October 31	Olympic Club*	Ewing Field; San Francisco, CA	W 21–0	15,000	
November 6	at Gonzaga*	Gonzaga Stadium; Spokane, WA	T 0–0		
November 13	at Pacific (CA)	College of the Pacific Field; Stockton, CA	W 67–7	7,000	
November 19	at Fresno State	Fresno State College Stadium; Fresno, CA	W 16–0	> 3,000	
November 27	Santa Clara*	Kezar Stadium; San Francisco, CA	W 7–0	21,000	
*Non-conference game
