= 1926 Stanford football team =

American college football season

1926 Stanford football

National champion (Dickinson) Co-national champion (Helms, NCF, and Sagarin) PCC champion

Rose Bowl, T 7–7 vs. Alabama
- Conference: Pacific Coast Conference
- Record: 10–0–1 (4–0 PCC)
- Head coach: Pop Warner (3rd season)
- Offensive scheme: Double-wing
- Home stadium: Stanford Stadium

Uniform

1926 Pacific Coast Conference football standings
	Conf.					Overall
Team	W		L		T	W		L		T
No. 1 Stanford $	4	–	0	–	0	10	–	0	–	1
No. 6 USC	5	–	1	–	0	8	–	2	–	0
Oregon Agricultural	4	–	1	–	0	7	–	1	–	0
Washington State	4	–	1	–	0	6	–	1	–	0
Washington	3	–	2	–	0	8	–	2	–	0
Oregon	1	–	4	–	0	2	–	4	–	1
Idaho	1	–	4	–	0	3	–	4	–	1
Montana	0	–	4	–	0	3	–	5	–	0
California	0	–	5	–	0	3	–	6	–	0
$ – Conference champion; Rankings from Dickinson System

Back and front panels of the game program for the Nov. 20, 1926 "Big Game" with Cal.

The 1926 Stanford Indians football team was an American football team that represented Stanford University in the Pacific Coast Conference (PCC) during the 1926 college football season. In head coach Pop Warner's third season at Stanford, the team compiled a 10–0 record during the regular season, outscored its opponents by a total of 261 to 66, and won the PCC championship. Stanford then faced undefeated Alabama in the 1927 Rose Bowl, which ended in a 7–7 tie.

In December 1926, prior to the Rose Bowl, Stanford was selected as the national champion under the Dickinson System. Stanford garnered 22.5 points from Dickinson. Navy ranked second with 21.88 points, and Alabama was ranked No. 10 with 16.67 points, due to weak schedule strength.

In later retroactive ratings, Stanford was chosen as a co-national champion with Alabama by the Helms Athletic Foundation, National Championship Foundation, and Jeff Sagarin (using the ELO-Chess methodology).

The team played its home games at Stanford Stadium in Stanford, California.

== Schedule ==
Date	Opponent	Site	Result	Attendance	Source
September 25	Fresno State*	Stanford Stadium; Stanford, CA	W 44–7		
September 25	Caltech*	Stanford Stadium; Stanford, CA	W 13–0		
October 2	Occidental*	Stanford Stadium; Stanford, CA	W 19–0		
October 9	Olympic Club*	Stanford Stadium; Stanford, CA	W 7–3		
October 16	Nevada*	Stanford Stadium; Stanford, CA	W 33–9	10,000	
October 23	at Oregon	Hayward Field; Eugene, OR	W 29–12		
October 30	at USC	Los Angeles Memorial Coliseum; Los Angeles, CA (rivalry)	W 13–12	79,000–80,000	
November 6	Santa Clara*	Stanford Stadium; Stanford, CA	W 33–14	18,000	
November 13	Washington	Stanford Stadium; Stanford, CA	W 29–10	43,000	
November 20	at California	California Memorial Stadium; Berkeley, CA (Big Game)	W 41–6	80,000, plus 10,000 (Tightwad Hill)	
January 1, 1927	vs. Alabama*	Rose Bowl; Pasadena, CA (Rose Bowl)	T 7–7	56,000	
*Non-conference game

== Game summaries ==
=== Rose Bowl ===
	1	2	3	4	Total
Alabama	0	0	0	7	7
Stanford	7	0	0	0	7

The 1927 Rose Bowl was held on January 1, 1927, in Pasadena, California. Stanford (10-0, 4-0 PCC) faced off against the Southern Conference Champions, the Alabama Crimson Tide (9-0, 8-0 SoCon). The game would end in a 7–7, and was the last Rose Bowl game to end in a tie.

United Press called the 1927 Rose Bowl "the football championship of America", and the game was considered the most exciting in the series up to that time. The crowd of 68,000 set an attendance record. Stanford's George Bogue missed an 18-yard field goal attempt in the first quarter, then threw a touchdown pass to Ed Walker and kicked the point after to put Stanford up, 7-0. Stanford held that lead through most of the rest of the game, but in the final minutes, they were forced to punt on fourth down. Frankie Wilton's kick was blocked, and Alabama took over 14 yards from goal. Four plays later, and with a minute left, Jimmy Johnson carried the ball for a touchdown, making it 7-6. The two-point conversion, and overtime, were decades in the future. Stanford's only hope was to block the point after, but Alabama ran the play quickly and Herschel Caldwell's kick tied Stanford, and took away a Stanford victory in the final minute.

== Roster ==
- George Bogue, HB
- Davidson, E
- Everett, T
- Freeman, T
- Graham, C
- Graves, HB
- Spud Harder, E
- Leo Harris, T
- Hill, HB
- Biff Hoffman, FB
- Richard Hyland, HB
- Kazanjian, G
- Leistner, HB
- Spud Lewis, QB
- McCreery, C
- Millage, QB
- Moomaw, T
- Murphy, HB
- Ernest Lynn Patchett, FB
- Post, QB
- Poulson, T
- Price, E
- Don Robesky, G
- Sellman, T
- Ted Shipkey, E
- Sholes, G
- Sims, HB
- Fred H. Swan, G
- Symonds, G
- Trombetta, HB
- Vermilya, C
- Vincenti, E
- Ed Walker, FB
- Frank Wilton, HB
- Work, HB

== Awards ==
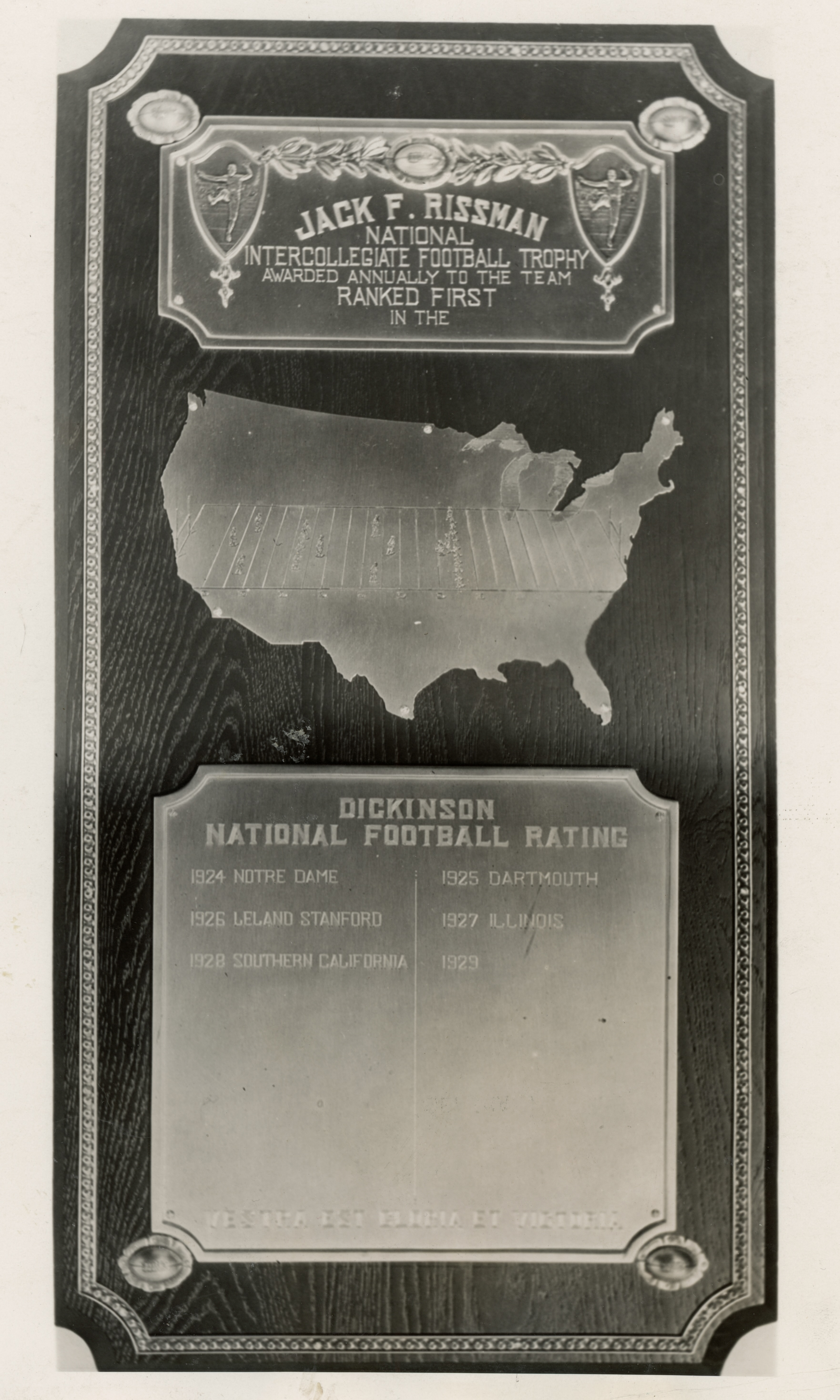
Jack F. Rissman National Intercollegiate Football Trophy — Awarded annually to the team ranked first in the Dickinson National Football Rating

Six Stanford players received mention on the 1926 All-America college football team and/or the 1926 All-Pacific Coast football team:

- End Ted Shipkey

- First-team All-America honors from the All-America Board and Red Grange.
- First-team All-Pacific Coast honors from the Associated Press (AP) and United Press (UP)

- Halfback Dick Hyland

- First-team All-America honors from Lawrence Perry.
- First-team All-Pacific Coast honors from the UP and second-team honors from the AP.

- Guard Fred H. Swan

- First-team All-America honors from Charles E. Parker for the New York World News Service
- First-team All-Pacific Coast honors from the AP and UP

- Halfback/fullback George Bogue

- Third-team All-America honors from Billy Evans and Walter Eckersall.
- First-team All-Pacific Coast honors from the AP and UP

- End Edgar Walker

- First-team All-Pacific Coast honors from the AP and UP

- Tackle Sellman

- First-team All-Pacific Coast honors from the UP
