= 1926 California Golden Bears football team =

American college football season

1926 California Golden Bears football
- Conference: Pacific Coast Conference
- Record: 3–6 (0–5 PCC)
- Head coach: Nibs Price (1st season)
- Captain: Bert Griffin
- Home stadium: California Memorial Stadium

Uniform
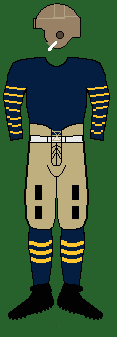

1926 Pacific Coast Conference football standings
	Conf.					Overall
Team	W		L		T	W		L		T
No. 1 Stanford $	4	–	0	–	0	10	–	0	–	1
No. 6 USC	5	–	1	–	0	8	–	2	–	0
Oregon Agricultural	4	–	1	–	0	7	–	1	–	0
Washington State	4	–	1	–	0	6	–	1	–	0
Washington	3	–	2	–	0	8	–	2	–	0
Oregon	1	–	4	–	0	2	–	4	–	1
Idaho	1	–	4	–	0	3	–	4	–	1
Montana	0	–	4	–	0	3	–	5	–	0
California	0	–	5	–	0	3	–	6	–	0
$ – Conference champion; Rankings from Dickinson System

The 1926 California Golden Bears football team was an American football team that represented the University of California, Berkeley during the 1926 college football season. Under head coach Nibs Price, the team compiled an overall record of 3–6 and 0–5 in conference.

== Schedule ==
Date	Opponent	Site	Result	Attendance	Source
September 25	Santa Clara*	California Memorial Stadium; Berkeley, CA	W 13–6	25,000	
October 2	Olympic Club*	California Memorial Stadium; Berkeley, CA	W 32–0		
October 9	Saint Mary's*	California Memorial Stadium; Berkeley, CA	L 7–26	67,000	
October 16	Oregon Agricultural	California Memorial Stadium; Berkeley, CA	L 7–27	25,000	
October 23	USC	California Memorial Stadium; Berkeley, CA	L 0–27	72,000	
October 30	Oregon	California Memorial Stadium; Berkeley, CA	L 13–21		
November 6	at Washington	Husky Stadium; Seattle, WA	L 7–13	25,000	
November 13	Nevada*	California Memorial Stadium; Berkeley, CA	W 20–6		
November 20	Stanford	California Memorial Stadium; Berkeley, CA (Big Game)	L 6–41	80,000, plus 10,000 (Tightwad Hill)	
*Non-conference game

Program for the October 16 game against Oregon Agricultural College (today's Oregon State University).

Back and front panels of the game program for the Nov. 20, 1926 "Big Game" with Stanford.
