= 1926 Pacific Tigers football team =

American college football season

1926 Pacific Tigers football
- Conference: Far Western Conference
- Record: 5–3–1 (1–2–1 FWC)
- Head coach: Erwin Righter (6th season)
- Home stadium: College of the Pacific Field

1926 Far Western Conference football standings
	Conf.					Overall
Team	W		L		T	W		L		T
Saint Mary's $	4	–	0	–	0	9	–	0	–	1
Nevada	3	–	1	–	0	4	–	4	–	0
Fresno State	1	–	2	–	1	5	–	3	–	1
Pacific (CA)	1	–	2	–	1	5	–	3	–	1
Cal Aggies	0	–	4	–	0	2	–	6	–	1
$ – Conference champion

The 1926 Pacific Tigers football team represented the College of the Pacific—now known as the University of the Pacific—in Stockton, California as a member of the Far Western Conference (FWC) during the 1926 college football season. The team was led by sixth-year head coach Erwin Righter and played home games at a field on campus in Stockton. Pacific compiled an overall record of 5–3–1 with a mark of 1–2–1 in conference play, tying for third in the FWC. The Tigers were outscored by their opponents 112 to 105 for the season.

== Schedule ==
Date	Opponent	Site	Result	Attendance	Source
September 25	San Jose State alumni*	College of the Pacific Field; Stockton, CA	W 38–0		
October 2	at Nevada	Mackay Stadium (Note: This stadium is the predecessor to the current Mackay Stadium, which was opened for the 1966 season.); Reno, NV	L 0–6		
October 9	at Santa Clara*	Mission Field; Santa Clara, CA	L 0–17		
October 16	Mare Island Marines*	College of the Pacific Field; Stockton, CA	W 7–0		
October 23	at Cal Aggies	Davis, CA	W 19–3		
October 30	9th Army Corps (WA)*	College of the Pacific Field; Stockton, CA	W 14–13		
November 6	Chico State*	College of the Pacific Field; Stockton, CA	W 20–6		
November 13	Saint Mary’s^{†}	C.O.P. Field; Stockton, CA	L 7–67	7,000	
November 25	Fresno State	College of the Pacific Field; Stockton, CA	T 0–0		
*Non-conference game; ^{†}Homecoming
