= 1926 Idaho Vandals football team =

American college football season

1926 Idaho Vandals football
- Conference: Pacific Coast Conference
- Record: 3–4–1 (1–4 PCC)
- Head coach: Charles F. Erb (1st season)
- Home stadium: MacLean Field

1926 Pacific Coast Conference football standings
	Conf.					Overall
Team	W		L		T	W		L		T
No. 1 Stanford $	4	–	0	–	0	10	–	0	–	1
No. 6 USC	5	–	1	–	0	8	–	2	–	0
Oregon Agricultural	4	–	1	–	0	7	–	1	–	0
Washington State	4	–	1	–	0	6	–	1	–	0
Washington	3	–	2	–	0	8	–	2	–	0
Oregon	1	–	4	–	0	2	–	4	–	1
Idaho	1	–	4	–	0	3	–	4	–	1
Montana	0	–	4	–	0	3	–	5	–	0
California	0	–	5	–	0	3	–	6	–	0
$ – Conference champion; Rankings from Dickinson System

The 1926 Idaho Vandals football team represented the University of Idaho in the 1926 college football season. The Vandals were led by first-year head coach Charles F. Erb and were in their fifth season in the Pacific Coast Conference (PCC). Home games were played on campus in Moscow at MacLean Field. Idaho compiled a 3–4–1 overall record and went 1–4 in conference games.

In the Battle of the Palouse with neighbor Washington State, the Vandals' three-game winning streak in the series ended with a 6–0 homecoming loss in the mud on November 6.

Following the departure of Matty Mathews in April for St. Louis, Erb was hired as the Vandals' head coach in May. Earlier in the decade, he was an all-PCC quarterback at the University of California, leading the Wonder Teams of hall of fame head coach Andy Smith. The 23-year-old Erb was previously the head coach at the University of Nevada in Reno.

== Schedule ==
Date	Opponent	Site	Result	Attendance	Source
October 2	Montana State*	MacLean Field; Moscow, ID	T 0–0		
October 9	at Montana	Dornblaser Field; Missoula, MT (rivalry)	W 27–12		
October 16	at Washington	Husky Stadium; Seattle, WA	L 0–26	16,891	
October 23	College of Idaho*	MacLean Field; Moscow, ID	W 30–0		
October 30	at Oregon Agricultural	Multnomah Stadium; Portland, OR	L 0–3		
November 6	Washington State^{†}	MacLean Field; Moscow, ID (Battle of the Palouse)	L 0–6	9,000	
November 20	at USC	Los Angeles Memorial Coliseum; Los Angeles, CA	L 6–28	17,400	
November 25	at Creighton*	Creighton Stadium; Omaha, NE	W 12–0		
*Non-conference game; ^{†}Homecoming
