= 1926 Washington Huskies football team =

American college football season

1926 Washington Huskies football
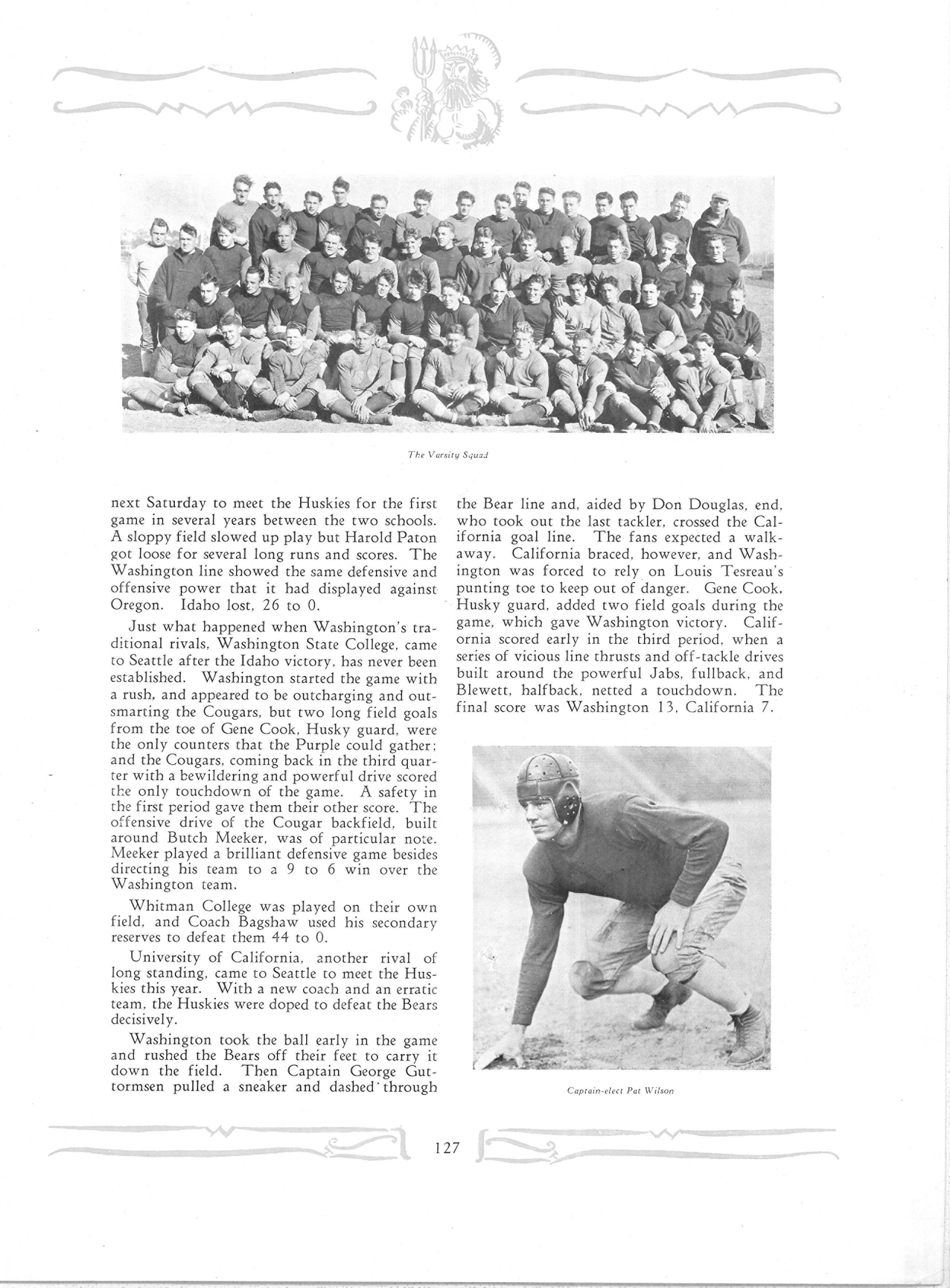
- Conference: Pacific Coast Conference
- Record: 8–2 (3–2 PCC)
- Head coach: Enoch Bagshaw (6th season)
- Captain: George Guttormsen
- Home stadium: University of Washington Stadium

Uniform
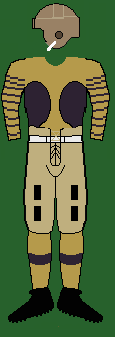

1926 Pacific Coast Conference football standings
	Conf.					Overall
Team	W		L		T	W		L		T
No. 1 Stanford $	4	–	0	–	0	10	–	0	–	1
No. 6 USC	5	–	1	–	0	8	–	2	–	0
Oregon Agricultural	4	–	1	–	0	7	–	1	–	0
Washington State	4	–	1	–	0	6	–	1	–	0
Washington	3	–	2	–	0	8	–	2	–	0
Oregon	1	–	4	–	0	2	–	4	–	1
Idaho	1	–	4	–	0	3	–	4	–	1
Montana	0	–	4	–	0	3	–	5	–	0
California	0	–	5	–	0	3	–	6	–	0
$ – Conference champion; Rankings from Dickinson System

The 1926 Washington Huskies football team was an American football team that represented the University of Washington during the 1926 college football season. In its sixth season under head coach Enoch Bagshaw, the team compiled an 8–2 record, finished in fifth place in the Pacific Coast Conference, and outscored all opponents by a combined total of 213 to 60. George Guttormsen was the team captain.

== Schedule ==
Date	Opponent	Site	Result	Attendance	Source
September 25	USS New Mexico*	University of Washington Stadium; Seattle, WA	W 20–0	2,600	
October 2	Willamette*	University of Washington Stadium; Seattle, WA	W 28–0	3,316	
October 2	Puget Sound*	University of Washington Stadium; Seattle, WA	W 33–0	3,316	
October 9	at Oregon	Multnomah Field; Portland, OR (rivalry)	W 23–9	25,000	
October 16	Idaho	University of Washington Stadium; Seattle, WA	W 26–0	16,891	
October 23	Washington State	University of Washington Stadium; Seattle, WA (rivalry)	L 6–9	28,000	
October 30	at Whitman*	Civic Stadium; Walla Walla, WA	W 44–0	4,000	
November 6	California	University of Washington Stadium; Seattle, WA	W 13–7	25,000	
November 13	at Stanford	Stanford Stadium; Stanford, CA	L 10–29	43,000	
November 25	Nebraska*	University of Washington Stadium; Seattle, WA	W 10–6	20,469	
*Non-conference game
