= 1926 Tempe State Bulldogs football team =

American college football season

1926 Tempe State Bulldogs football
- Conference: Independent
- Record: 4–1–1
- Head coach: Aaron McCreary (4th season)
- Home stadium: Normal Field

1926 Western college football independents records
	Conf.			Overall
Team	W	L	T	W		L		T
Loyola (CA)		–		6	–	0	–	2
Arizona		–		5	–	1	–	1
Regis		–		6	–	2	–	0
Tempe State		–		4	–	1	–	1
Gonzaga		–		5	–	2	–	1
New Mexico		–		4	–	2	–	1
New Mexico A&M		–		5	–	3	–	1
Hawaii		–		5	–	4	–	0
Santa Clara		–		5	–	4	–	0
St. Ignatius (CA)		–		2	–	3	–	3
Santa Barbara State		–		2	–	4	–	0

The 1926 Tempe State Bulldogs football team was an American football team that represented Tempe State Teachers College (later renamed Arizona State University) as an independent during the 1926 college football season. In their fourth season under head coach Aaron McCreary, the Bulldogs compiled a 4–1–1 record and outscored their opponents by a combined total of 97 to 42. The team's games included a 35–0 loss in the Arizona–Arizona State football rivalry. Ernest Simpkins was the team captain.

== Schedule ==
Date	Opponent	Site	Result	Source
October 2	Sacaton Indians	Normal Field; Tempe, AZ	W 35–0	
October 16	at Arizona	Tucson, AZ (rivalry)	L 0–35	
October 30	at Phoenix College	High School Stadium; Phoenix, AZ	W 28–7	
November 6	Gila College	Normal Field; Tempe, AZ	W 20–0	
November 12	Northern Arizona	Normal Field; Tempe, AZ	W 14–0	
December 4	Phoenix Indian School	Normal Field; Tempe, AZ	T 0–0	
