= 1926 Oregon Agricultural Aggies football team =

American college football season

1926 Oregon Agricultural Aggies football
- Conference: Pacific Coast Conference
- Record: 7–1 (4–1 PCC)
- Head coach: Paul J. Schissler (3rd season)
- Captain: W. "Ironhorse" Schulmerich
- Home stadium: Bell Field

1926 Pacific Coast Conference football standings
| | Conf. | | | | | Overall |
| Team | W | | L | | T | W | | L | | T |
|---|---|---|---|---|---|---|---|---|---|---|
| No. 1 Stanford $ | 4 | – | 0 | – | 0 | 10 | – | 0 | – | 1 |
| No. 6 USC | 5 | – | 1 | – | 0 | 8 | – | 2 | – | 0 |
| Oregon Agricultural | 4 | – | 1 | – | 0 | 7 | – | 1 | – | 0 |
| Washington State | 4 | – | 1 | – | 0 | 6 | – | 1 | – | 0 |
| Washington | 3 | – | 2 | – | 0 | 8 | – | 2 | – | 0 |
| Oregon | 1 | – | 4 | – | 0 | 2 | – | 4 | – | 1 |
| Idaho | 1 | – | 4 | – | 0 | 3 | – | 4 | – | 1 |
| Montana | 0 | – | 4 | – | 0 | 3 | – | 5 | – | 0 |
| California | 0 | – | 5 | – | 0 | 3 | – | 6 | – | 0 |
$ – Conference champion; Rankings from Dickinson System

The 1926 Oregon Agricultural Aggies football team represented Oregon Agricultural College (now Oregon State University) in the Pacific Coast Conference (PCC) during the 1926 college football season. In their third season under head coach Paul J. Schissler, the Aggies compiled a 7–1 record (4–1 in PCC) and outscored their opponents 221 to 30. Under coach Schissler, from 1925 to 1932, no team captains were elected. The team played its home games on campus at Bell Field in Corvallis, Oregon.

Program for the October 16 game against the California Golden Bears.

Program for the November 30 game against the University of Oregon Webfoots.

== Schedule ==
| Date | Opponent | Site | Result | Attendance | Source |
|---|---|---|---|---|---|
| September 25 | Multnomah Athletic Club* | Bell Field; Corvallis, OR | W 67–0 | | |
| October 2 | at Montana | Dornblaser Field; Missoula, MT | W 49–0 | | |
| October 8 | Gonzaga* | Bell Field; Corvallis, OR | W 23–6 | | |
| October 16 | at California | California Memorial Stadium; Berkeley, CA | W 27–7 | | |
| October 30 | vs. Idaho | Multnomah Stadium; Portland, OR | W 3–0 | | |
| November 11 | vs. USC | Multnomah Stadium; Portland, OR | L 7–17 | | |
| November 20 | Oregon | Bell Field; Corvallis, OR (rivalry) | W 16–0 | | |
| November 25 | at Marquette* | Marquette Stadium; Milwaukee, WI | W 29–0 | 15,000 | |
*Non-conference game
