= 1926 Nevada Wolf Pack football team =

American college football season

1926 Nevada Wolf Pack football
- Conference: Far Western Conference
- Record: 4–4 (3–1 FWC)
- Head coach: Buck Shaw (2nd season)
- Home stadium: Mackay Field

1926 Far Western Conference football standings
	Conf.					Overall
Team	W		L		T	W		L		T
Saint Mary's $	4	–	0	–	0	9	–	0	–	1
Nevada	3	–	1	–	0	4	–	4	–	0
Fresno State	1	–	2	–	1	5	–	3	–	1
Pacific (CA)	1	–	2	–	1	5	–	3	–	1
Cal Aggies	0	–	4	–	0	2	–	6	–	1
$ – Conference champion

The 1926 Nevada Wolf Pack football team was an American football team that represented the University of Nevada in the Far Western Conference (FWC) during the 1926 college football season. In their second season under head coach Buck Shaw, the team compiled a 4–4 record (3–1 FWC) and finished second in the conference.

== Schedule ==
Date	Opponent	Site	Result	Attendance	Source
September 25	St. Ignatius (CA)*	Mackay Field; Reno, NV	W 27–14		
October 2	Pacific (CA)	Mackay Field; Reno, NV	W 6–0		
October 9	at Fresno State	Fresno State College Stadium; Fresno, CA	W 26–7		
October 16	at Stanford*	Stanford Stadium; Stanford, CA	L 9–33	10,000	
October 23	Saint Mary's	Mackay Field; Reno, NV	L 0–13		
October 30	at Santa Clara*	Santa Clara, CA	L 0–25		
November 6	Cal Aggies	Mackay Field; Reno, NV	W 45–7		
November 13	at California*	California Memorial Stadium; Berkeley, CA	L 7–20		
*Non-conference game
