= 1926 Oregon Webfoots football team =

American college football season

1926 Oregon Webfoots football
- Conference: Pacific Coast Conference
- Record: 2–4–1 (1–4 PCC)
- Head coach: John McEwan (1st season)
- Captain: Albert Sinclair
- Home stadium: Hayward Field

1926 Pacific Coast Conference football standings
	Conf.					Overall
Team	W		L		T	W		L		T
No. 1 Stanford $	4	–	0	–	0	10	–	0	–	1
No. 6 USC	5	–	1	–	0	8	–	2	–	0
Oregon Agricultural	4	–	1	–	0	7	–	1	–	0
Washington State	4	–	1	–	0	6	–	1	–	0
Washington	3	–	2	–	0	8	–	2	–	0
Oregon	1	–	4	–	0	2	–	4	–	1
Idaho	1	–	4	–	0	3	–	4	–	1
Montana	0	–	4	–	0	3	–	5	–	0
California	0	–	5	–	0	3	–	6	–	0
$ – Conference champion; Rankings from Dickinson System

The 1926 Oregon Webfoots football team represented the University of Oregon in the Pacific Coast Conference (PCC) during the 1926 college football season. In their first season under head coach John McEwan, the Webfoots compiled a 2–4–1 record (1–4 against PCC opponents), finished in a tie for sixth place in the PCC, and were outscored by their opponents, 88 to 86. The team played its home games at Hayward Field in Eugene, Oregon.

== Schedule ==
Date	Opponent	Site	Result	Attendance	Source
September 25	Willamette*	Hayward Field; Eugene, OR	W 44–0		
October 2	Pacific (OR)*	Hayward Field; Eugene, OR	T 0–0		
October 9	Washington	Multnomah Field; Portland, OR (rivalry)	L 9–23	25,000	
October 23	Stanford	Hayward Field; Eugene, OR	L 12–29		
October 30	at California	California Memorial Stadium; Berkeley, CA	W 21–13		
November 13	at Washington State	Rogers Field; Pullman, WA	L 0–7	7,500–8,000	
November 20	at Oregon Agricultural	Bell Field; Corvallis, OR (rivalry)	L 0–16		
*Non-conference game
