= 1926 Montana Grizzlies football team =

American college football season

1926 Montana Grizzlies football
- Conference: Pacific Coast Conference
- Record: 3–5 (0–4 PCC)
- Head coach: Frank W. Milburn (1st season)
- Home stadium: Dornblaser Field

1926 Pacific Coast Conference football standings
	Conf.					Overall
Team	W		L		T	W		L		T
No. 1 Stanford $	4	–	0	–	0	10	–	0	–	1
No. 6 USC	5	–	1	–	0	8	–	2	–	0
Oregon Agricultural	4	–	1	–	0	7	–	1	–	0
Washington State	4	–	1	–	0	6	–	1	–	0
Washington	3	–	2	–	0	8	–	2	–	0
Oregon	1	–	4	–	0	2	–	4	–	1
Idaho	1	–	4	–	0	3	–	4	–	1
Montana	0	–	4	–	0	3	–	5	–	0
California	0	–	5	–	0	3	–	6	–	0
$ – Conference champion; Rankings from Dickinson System

The 1926 Montana Grizzlies football team represented the University of Montana in the 1926 college football season as a member of the Pacific Coast Conference (PCC). The Grizzlies were led by first-year head coach Frank W. Milburn, played their home games at Dornblaser Field and finished the season with a record of three wins and five losses (3–5, 0–4 PCC).

== Schedule ==
Date	Time	Opponent	Site	Result	Attendance	Source
October 2		Oregon Agricultural	Dornblaser Field; Missoula, MT	L 0–49		
October 9		Idaho	Dornblaser Field; Missoula, MT (rivalry)	L 12–27		
October 16		at Washington State	Rogers Field; Pullman, WA	L 6–14	2,000	
October 23		vs. Montana State*	Clark Park; Butte, MT (rivalry)	W 27–0		
October 30		at Gonzaga*	Gonzaga Stadium; Spokane, WA	L 6–10		
November 13		Whitman*	Dornblaser Field; Missoula, MT	W 56–7		
November 19	1:30 p.m	at Cal Aggies*	Moreing Field; Sacramento, CA	W 21–0		
November 25		at USC	Los Angeles Memorial Coliseum; Los Angeles, CA	L 0–61	18,600	
*Non-conference game; All times are in Mountain time
