= George Bogue =

American football player (1906–1972)

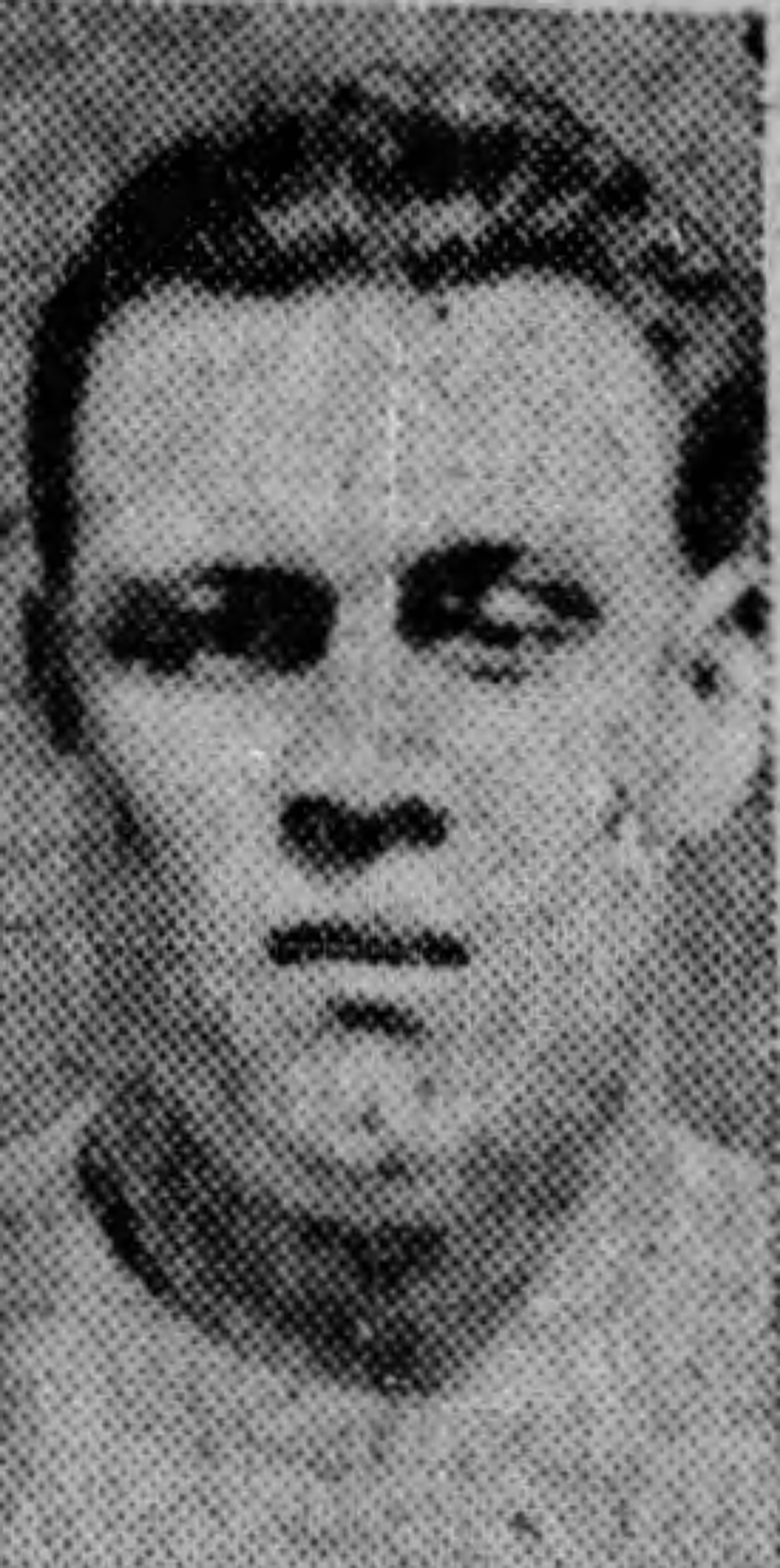

Profile
- Positions: Halfback, Fullback

Personal information
- Born: February 10, 1906; Omaha, Nebraska, U.S.
- Died: October 13, 1972 (aged 66); Pasadena, California, U.S.
- Listed height: 6 ft 0 in (1.83 m)
- Listed weight: 210 lb (95 kg)

Career information
- High school: San Mateo (CA)
- College: Stanford

Career history
- Chicago Cardinals (1930); Newark Tornadoes (1930)

Awards and highlights
- National champion (1926); First-team All-PCC (1926)
- Stats at Pro Football Reference

George Richardson Bogue (February 10, 1906 – October 13, 1972) was an American football player.

Bogue was born in Omaha, Nebraska, in 1906. He attended San Mateo High School in San Mateo, California.

He attended Stanford University where he played college football from 1923 to 1926. He was a halfback on the undefeated 1926 Stanford football team that tied Alabama in the 1927 Rose Bowl and was recognized as co-national champion. While at Stanford, he was described as "the wild bull of the Farm" and "one of the most terrific tackle smashers in western football." He threw a touchdown pass in the Rose Bowl to give Stanford its only touchdown of the game. After the Rose Bowl, Alabama coach Wallace Wade called Bogue "one of the greatest players I've seen."

Bogue was selected by Billy Evans as the third-team halfback on his 1926 College Football All-America Team. He was also selected by both the Associated Press and United Press ]as a first-team player on the 1926 All-Pacific Coast football team.

After graduating from Stanford, Bogue went into the insurance business in San Francisco. In May 1928, he married Hazel Craig at the Stanford Memorial Chapel.

He played club football for the Olympic Club in San Francisco during the 1927 season. He later played at the fullback and halfback positions in the National Football League for the Chicago Cardinals and Newark Tornadoes during the 1930 NFL season. He appeared in six NFL games, all of them as a starter, and scored one touchdown. At the end of the 1930 season, he sued the Cardinals for unpaid salary. He alleged that his contract required the club to pay him $2,500 which they tried to avoid by sending him "under protest" to Newark.

Bogue died in 1972 in Pasadena, California.
