= 1926 Cal Aggies football team =

American college football season

1926 Cal Aggies football
- Conference: Far Western Conference
- Record: 2–6–1 (0–4 FWC)
- Head coach: William L. Driver (4th season)
- Captain: Waldo Weeth
- Home stadium: Moreing Field

1926 Far Western Conference football standings
	Conf.					Overall
Team	W		L		T	W		L		T
Saint Mary's $	4	–	0	–	0	9	–	0	–	1
Nevada	3	–	1	–	0	4	–	4	–	0
Fresno State	1	–	2	–	1	5	–	3	–	1
Pacific (CA)	1	–	2	–	1	5	–	3	–	1
Cal Aggies	0	–	4	–	0	2	–	6	–	1
$ – Conference champion

The 1926 Cal Aggies football team represented the Northern Branch of the College of Agriculture—now known as the University of California, Davis—as a member of the Far Western Conference (FWC) during the 1926 college football season. The team was known as the Cal Aggies, California Aggies, and sometimes the Cal Aggies Mustangs. Led by fourth-year head coach William L. Driver, the Cal Aggies compiled an overall record of 2–6–1 with a mark of 0–4 in conference play, placing last out of five teams in the FWC. The team was outscored by its opponents 147 to 84 for the season. The Cal Aggies played home games at Moreing Field in Sacramento, California.

== Schedule ==
Date	Time	Opponent	Site	Result	Source
September 25		Mare Island Naval Hospital Training School*	Davis, CA	W 37–7	
October 2		at BYU*	Cougar Stadium (Note: This stadium is the predecessor to the current Cougar Stadium on the BYU campus, which was opened for the 1964 season); Provo, UT	W 17–0	
October 16		at Saint Mary's	Ewing Field; San Francisco, CA	L 7–20	
October 23		at Pacific (CA)	C.O.P. Field; Stockton, CA	L 3–19	
October 30		St. Ignatius (CA)*	Davis, CA	L 0–6	
November 6		at Nevada	Mackay Stadium (Note: This stadium is the predecessor to the current Mackay Stadium, which was opened for the 1966 season.); Reno, NV	L 7–45	
November 11		at Fresno State	Fresno State College Stadium; Fresno, CA	L 7–23	
November 19	2:30 p.m.	Montana*	Moreing Field; Sacramento, CA	L 0–21	
November 25		Caltech*	Moreing Field; Sacramento, CA	T 6–6	
*Non-conference game; All times are in Pacific time
