= Arthur Burkholder =

American football player and coach (1892–1952)

Biographical details
- Born: June 6, 1892; Marion, Kansas, U.S.
- Died: July 28, 1952 (aged 60); Hays, Kansas, U.S.

Playing career
- 1911–1913: Kansas State
- Position: Guard

Coaching career (HC unless noted)
- 1926: New Mexico A&M

Head coaching record
- Overall: 5–3–1

Arthur L. "Bill" Burkholder (June 6, 1892 – July 28, 1952) was an American football player and coach. He played college football for Kansas State from 1911 to 1913 and served as head coach at New Mexico A&M in 1926.

== Early years ==
A native of Marion, Kansas, Burkholder played college football at Kansas State Agricultural from 1911 to 1913 and was an All-Missouri Valley Conference guard. During World War I, he served in the United States Army and played on the 89th Division football team. He worked at the Fort Hays Experiment Station for 10 years.

== Coaching career ==
Burkholder served as head coach of the 1926 New Mexico A&M Aggies football team, leading the team to a 5–3–1 record, including four shutout victories.

== Later years ==
Burkholder returned to Kansas in 1930, settling in Plainville where he worked in the cattle business and as a tax accountant. He died from a heart attack in 1952 at age 60. He never married.

== Head coaching record ==
Year	Team	Overall	Conference	Standing	Bowl/playoffs
New Mexico A&M Aggies (Independent) (1926)
1926	New Mexico A&M	5–3–1			
New Mexico A&M:		5–3–1			
Total:		5–3–1			
