= 1926 Fresno State Bulldogs football team =

American college football season

1926 Fresno State Bulldogs football
- Conference: Far Western Conference
- Record: 5–3–1 (1–2–1 FWC)
- Head coach: Arthur W. Jones (6th season)
- Home stadium: Fresno State College Stadium

1926 Far Western Conference football standings
	Conf.					Overall
Team	W		L		T	W		L		T
Saint Mary's $	4	–	0	–	0	9	–	0	–	1
Nevada	3	–	1	–	0	4	–	4	–	0
Fresno State	1	–	2	–	1	5	–	3	–	1
Pacific (CA)	1	–	2	–	1	5	–	3	–	1
Cal Aggies	0	–	4	–	0	2	–	6	–	1
$ – Conference champion

The 1926 Fresno State Bulldogs football team represented Fresno State Normal School—now known as California State University, Fresno—during the 1926 college football season.

Fresno State competed in the Far Western Conference (FWC). (Note: The Northern California Athletic Conference (NCAC) was known as the Far Western Conference (FWC) from its founding in 1925 to 1982.) The 1926 team was led by head coach Arthur W. Jones in his sixth year at the helm. They played home games at Fresno State College Stadium (Note: Ratcliffe Stadium was known as Fresno State College Stadium from 1926 to 1940.) on the campus of Fresno City College in Fresno, California. They finished with a record of five wins, three losses and one tie (5–3–1, 1–2–1 FWC). The Bulldogs outscored their opponents 147–107 for the season.

== Schedule ==
Date	Opponent	Site	Result	Attendance	Source
September 25	at Stanford*	Stanford Stadium; Stanford, CA	L 7–44		
October 2	Santa Barbara State*	Fresno State College Stadium; Fresno, CA	W 26–0		
October 9	Nevada	Fresno State College Stadium; Fresno, CA	L 7–26		
October 16	La Verne*	Fresno State College Stadium; Fresno, CA	W 22–7		
October 30	at San Diego State*	Navy "Sports" Field (Note: Navy "Sports" Field was the original name of what became Lane Field in downtown San Diego. It was converted to a baseball-only configuration in 1936.); San Diego, CA (rivalry)	W 28–7		
November 6	at San Jose State*	Spartan Field; San Jose, CA (rivalry)	W 34–0		
November 11	Cal Aggies	Fresno State College Stadium; Fresno, CA	W 23–7		
November 19	Saint Mary's	Fresno State College Stadium; Fresno, CA	L 0–16	> 3,000	
November 25	at Pacific (CA)	College of the Pacific Field; Stockton, CA	T 0–0		
*Non-conference game
