= 1927 Rose Bowl =

American college football game

- 13th Rose Bowl Game
Alabama Crimson Tide	Stanford
(9–0)	(10–0)
SoCon	PCC
7	7
Head coach: Wallace Wade	Head coach: Pop Warner
	1	2	3	4	Total
Alabama	0	0	0	7	7
Stanford	7	0	0	0	7
- Date: January 1, 1927
- Season: 1926
- Stadium: Rose Bowl
- Location: Pasadena, California
- MVP: Fred Pickhard (Alabama)
- Referee: Ernest C. Quigley
- Attendance: 57,417

The 1927 Rose Bowl Game was a college football bowl game held on January 1, 1927, in Pasadena, California. The game featured the Alabama Crimson Tide, of the Southern Conference, and Stanford, of the Pacific Coast Conference, now the Pac-12 Conference. It was Stanford's second Rose Bowl game in three years. The game ended in a 7–7 tie, the last Rose Bowl game to end in a tie.

== Game summary ==
United Press called the 1927 Rose Bowl "the football championship of America", and the game was considered the most exciting in the series up to that time. The crowd of 57,417 set an attendance record. Stanford's George Bogue missed an 18-yard field goal attempt in the first quarter, then threw a touchdown pass to Ed Walker and kicked the point after to put Stanford up, 7–0. Stanford held that lead through most of the rest of the game, but in the final minutes, they were forced to punt on fourth down. Frankie Wilton's kick was blocked, and Alabama took over 14 yards from goal. Alabama running back Jimmy Johnson carried the ball in for the touchdown. The two-point conversion, and overtime, were decades in the future. Stanford's only hope was to block the point after, but Alabama ran the play quickly and Herschel Caldwell's kick tied Stanford, and took away a Stanford victory in the final minute.

=== Scoring ===
==== First quarter ====
- Stan – Walker, 15-yard pass from Bogue (Bogue kick good)

==== Second quarter ====
- No scoring

==== Third quarter ====
- No scoring

==== Fourth quarter ====
- Ala – Johnson, 1-yard run (Caldwell kick good)
