= Emzy Harvey Lynch =

American football and basketball coach (1895–1979)

Biographical details
- Born: November 16, 1895; Hale Center, Texas, U.S.
- Died: July 4, 1979 (aged 83); Phoenix, Arizona, U.S.

Playing career

Football
- 1914–1916: Arizona
- 1919: Arizona

Coaching career (HC unless noted)

Football
- 1926–1927: Northern Arizona

Basketball
- 1926–1927: Northern Arizona

Head coaching record
- Overall: 5–2 (football); 17–3 (basketball)

Emzy Harvey "Swede" Lynch (November 16, 1895 – July 4, 1979) was an American college football and college basketball coach. He served as the head football coach at Northern Arizona State Teacher's College—now known as Northern Arizona University in 1926, compiling a record of 5–2. Lynch was also the head basketball coach at Northern Arizona in 1926–27, tallying a mark of 17–3. He played college football at the University of Arizona.

== Head coaching record ==
=== Football ===
Year	Team	Overall	Conference	Standing	Bowl/playoffs
Northern Arizona Lumberjacks (Independent) (1926–1927)
1926	Northern Arizona	5–2			
Northern Arizona:		5–2			
Total:		5–2			
