= 1926 Washington State Cougars football team =

American college football season

1926 Washington State Cougars football
- Conference: Pacific Coast Conference
- Record: 6–1 (4–1 PCC)
- Head coach: Babe Hollingbery (1st season)
- Home stadium: Rogers Field

1926 Pacific Coast Conference football standings
	Conf.					Overall
Team	W		L		T	W		L		T
No. 1 Stanford $	4	–	0	–	0	10	–	0	–	1
No. 6 USC	5	–	1	–	0	8	–	2	–	0
Oregon Agricultural	4	–	1	–	0	7	–	1	–	0
Washington State	4	–	1	–	0	6	–	1	–	0
Washington	3	–	2	–	0	8	–	2	–	0
Oregon	1	–	4	–	0	2	–	4	–	1
Idaho	1	–	4	–	0	3	–	4	–	1
Montana	0	–	4	–	0	3	–	5	–	0
California	0	–	5	–	0	3	–	6	–	0
$ – Conference champion; Rankings from Dickinson System

The 1926 Washington State Cougars football team was an American football team that represented Washington State College during the 1926 college football season. Head coach Babe Hollingbery led the team to a 4–1 mark in the PCC and 6–1 overall.

== Schedule ==
Date	Opponent	Site	Result	Attendance	Source
October 2	College of Idaho*	Rogers Field; Pullman, WA	W 35–0	1,500	
October 9	at USC	Los Angeles Memorial Coliseum; Los Angeles, CA	L 7–16	34,700	
October 16	Montana	Rogers Field; Pullman, WA	W 14–6	2,000	
October 23	at Washington	Husky Stadium; Seattle, WA (rivalry)	W 9–6	28,000	
November 6	at Idaho	MacLean Field; Moscow, ID (rivalry)	W 6–0	5,000	
November 13	Oregon^{†}	Rogers Field; Pullman, WA	W 7–0	7,500–8,000	
November 25	at Gonzaga*	Gonzaga Stadium; Spokane, WA	W 7–0	10,000	
*Non-conference game; ^{†}Homecoming
