= 1926 New Mexico A&M Aggies football team =

American college football season

1926 New Mexico A&M Aggies football
- Conference: Independent
- Record: 5–3–1
- Head coach: Arthur Burkholder (1st season)
- Captain: C. A. McNatt
- Home stadium: Miller Field

1926 Western college football independents records
	Conf.			Overall
Team	W	L	T	W		L		T
Loyola (CA)		–		6	–	0	–	2
Arizona		–		5	–	1	–	1
Regis		–		6	–	2	–	0
Tempe State		–		4	–	1	–	1
Gonzaga		–		5	–	2	–	1
New Mexico		–		4	–	2	–	1
New Mexico A&M		–		5	–	3	–	1
Hawaii		–		5	–	4	–	0
Santa Clara		–		5	–	4	–	0
St. Ignatius (CA)		–		2	–	3	–	3
Santa Barbara State		–		2	–	4	–	0

The 1926 New Mexico A&M Aggies football team was an American football team that represented New Mexico College of Agriculture and Mechanical Arts (now known as New Mexico State University) during the 1926 college football season. In their first year under head coach Arthur Burkholder, the Aggies compiled a 5–3–1 record and shut out four opponents. The team played home games on Miller Field, sometimes also referred to as College Field.

== Schedule ==
Date	Opponent	Site	Result	Attendance	Source
October 2	El Paso High School	Las Cruces, NM	W 7–0		
October 9	El Paso Junior College	Las Cruces, NM	W 20–0		
October 16	at Sul Ross	Alpine, TX	L 7–37		
	El Paso Garden Grocers	Las Cruces, NM	W 7–0		
October 22	Arizona^{†}	Las Cruces, NM	L 0–7		
October 30	Silver City Teachers	Las Cruces, NM	W 27–0		
November 6	at Texas Mines	El Paso, TX (rivalry)	W 10–8	700	
November 13	Sul Ross	Dudley Field; El Paso, TX	L 0–21		
November 13	New Mexico	Las Cruces, NM (rivalry)	T 6–6		
November 30	at New Mexico Military	Roswell, NM	L 6–7		
^{†}Homecoming
