= 1926 Gonzaga Bulldogs football team =

American college football season

1926 Gonzaga Bulldogs football
- Conference: Independent
- Record: 5–2–1
- Head coach: Clipper Smith (2nd season)
- Home stadium: Gonzaga Stadium

1926 Western college football independents records
	Conf.			Overall
Team	W	L	T	W		L		T
Loyola (CA)		–		6	–	0	–	2
Arizona		–		5	–	1	–	1
Regis		–		6	–	2	–	0
Tempe State		–		4	–	1	–	1
Gonzaga		–		5	–	2	–	1
New Mexico		–		4	–	2	–	1
New Mexico A&M		–		5	–	3	–	1
Hawaii		–		5	–	4	–	0
Santa Clara		–		5	–	4	–	0
St. Ignatius (CA)		–		2	–	3	–	3
Santa Barbara State		–		2	–	4	–	0

The 1926 Gonzaga Bulldogs football team was an American football team that represented Gonzaga University during the 1926 college football season. In their second year under head coach Clipper Smith, the Bulldogs compiled a 5–2–1 record and outscored all opponents by a total of 204 to 36.

The Bulldogs' 1926 roster included halfback Mel Ingram, who later played Major League Baseball.

== Schedule ==
Date	Opponent	Site	Result	Attendance	Source
September 25	Cheney Normal	Gonzaga Stadium; Spokane, WA	W 66–0		
October 2	Whitman	Gonzaga Stadium; Spokane, WA	W 26–0	3,000	
October 9	at Oregon Agricultural	Bell Field; Corvallis, OR	L 6–23		
October 16	at Multnomah Athletic Club	Portland, OR	W 55–0		
October 30	Montana	Gonzaga Stadium; Spokane, WA	W 10–6		
November 6	Saint Mary's	Gonzaga Stadium; Spokane, WA	T 0–0		
November 11	at Tacoma Athletic Club	Tacoma Stadium; Tacoma, WA	W 41–0		
November 25	Washington State	Gonzaga Stadium; Spokane, WA	L 0–7	10,000	
