= 1926 USC Trojans football team =

American college football season

1926 USC Trojans football
- Conference: Pacific Coast Conference
- Record: 8–2 (5–1 PCC)
- Head coach: Howard Jones (2nd season)
- Offensive scheme: Single-wing
- Captain: Jeff Cravath
- Home stadium: Los Angeles Memorial Coliseum

1926 Pacific Coast Conference football standings
	Conf.					Overall
Team	W		L		T	W		L		T
No. 1 Stanford $	4	–	0	–	0	10	–	0	–	1
No. 6 USC	5	–	1	–	0	8	–	2	–	0
Oregon Agricultural	4	–	1	–	0	7	–	1	–	0
Washington State	4	–	1	–	0	6	–	1	–	0
Washington	3	–	2	–	0	8	–	2	–	0
Oregon	1	–	4	–	0	2	–	4	–	1
Idaho	1	–	4	–	0	3	–	4	–	1
Montana	0	–	4	–	0	3	–	5	–	0
California	0	–	5	–	0	3	–	6	–	0
$ – Conference champion; Rankings from Dickinson System

The 1926 USC Trojans football team represented the University of Southern California (USC) in the 1926 college football season. In their second year under head coach Howard Jones, the Trojans compiled an 8–2 record (5–1 against conference opponents), finished in second place in the Pacific Coast Conference, and outscored their opponents by a combined total of 317 to 52. The season featured the first game in the Notre Dame–USC football rivalry; Notre Dame won by a 13 to 12 score in Los Angeles. The team was ranked No. 6 in the nation in the Dickinson System ratings released in December 1926. Tackle Marion Morrison later had a successful acting career under the stage name, John Wayne.

== Schedule ==
Date	Opponent	Site	Result	Attendance	Source
September 25	Whittier*	Los Angeles Memorial Coliseum; Los Angeles, CA	W 74–0	15,300	
October 2	Santa Clara*	Los Angeles Memorial Coliseum; Los Angeles, CA	W 42–0	36,000	
October 9	Washington State	Los Angeles Memorial Coliseum; Los Angeles, CA	W 16–7	34,700	
October 16	Occidental*	Los Angeles Memorial Coliseum; Los Angeles, CA	W 28–6	22,000	
October 23	at California	California Memorial Stadium; Berkeley, CA	W 27–0	72,000	
October 30	Stanford	Los Angeles Memorial Coliseum; Los Angeles, CA (rivalry)	L 12–13	78,500	
November 11	at Oregon Agricultural	Multnomah Stadium; Portland, OR	W 17–7	26,000	
November 20	Idaho	Los Angeles Memorial Coliseum; Los Angeles, CA	W 28–6	17,400	
November 25	Montana	Los Angeles Memorial Coliseum; Los Angeles, CA	W 61–0	18,600	
December 4	Notre Dame*^{†}	Los Angeles Memorial Coliseum; Los Angeles, CA (rivalry)	L 12–13	74,378	
*Non-conference game; ^{†}Homecoming

== Roster ==
No.	Player	Position	Height	Weight	Hometown	High School
-	Donald Williams	Back	-	-	-	-
-	Manuel Laraneta	-	-	-	-	-
-	Morton Kaer	Back	5-11	167	Red Bluff, CA	Red Bluff
24	Marion Morrison	Tackle	6-4	200	Glendale, CA	Glendale Union
-	Bert Heiser	-	-	-	-	-
-	Morley Drury	Back	6-0	185	Long Beach, CA	Long Beach Tech
-	Max Thomas	-	-	-	-	-
-	Lloyd Thomas	-	-	-	-	-
-	Field Thompson	-	-	-	-	-
-	Robert Lee	-	-	-	-	-
-	Hershel Bonham	-	-	-	-	-
-	Eugene Dorsey	-	-	-	-	-
-	Jesse Hibbs	Tackle	6-0	195	Lake Forest, IL	Lake Forest Academy
-	Alan Behrendt	-	-	-	-	-
-	Newell "Jeff" Cravath	Center	-	-	Santa Ana, CA	Santa Ana
-	Kenneth Cox	-	-	-	-	-
-	Theodore Gorrell	-	-	-	-	-
-	Alvin Schaub	-	-	-	-	-
-	Brice Taylor	Guard	-	-	Seattle, WA	Benjamin Franklin
-	John Fox	-	-	-	-	-
-	Howard Elliott	Back	-	-	-	-
-	James Moser	-	-	-	-	-
-	Morris "Red" Badgro	End	6-0	191	Kent, WA	Kent
-	Albert Scheving	-	-	-	-	-
-	Harold Wheeler	-	-	-	-	-
-	William Friend	-	-	-	-	-
-	Lloyd Hershberger	-	-	-	-	-
-	Donald Cruickshank	-	-	-	-	-
-	Oliver White	-	-	-	-	-
-	Eugene Beatie	-	-	-	-	-
-	Lowry McCaslin	-	-	-	-	-
-	Clarke De Groote	-	-	-	-	-
-	Lyle Baldridge	-	-	-	-	-
-	Leslie Lavelle	-	-	-	-	-
-	William Ford	-	-	-	-	-
-	Theodore "Soapy" Coffman	End	-	-	Santa Ana, CA	Santa Ana

Roster from 1927 El Rodeo yearbook
