= 1926 Arizona Wildcats football team =

American college football season

1926 Arizona Wildcats football
- Conference: Independent
- Record: 5–1–1
- Head coach: Pop McKale (12th season)
- Captain: Robert E. Crouch

1926 Western college football independents records
| | Conf. | | | Overall |
| Team | W | L | T | W | | L | | T |
|---|---|---|---|---|---|---|---|---|
| Loyola (CA) | | – | | 6 | – | 0 | – | 2 |
| Arizona | | – | | 5 | – | 1 | – | 1 |
| Regis | | – | | 6 | – | 2 | – | 0 |
| Tempe State | | – | | 4 | – | 1 | – | 1 |
| Gonzaga | | – | | 5 | – | 2 | – | 1 |
| New Mexico | | – | | 4 | – | 2 | – | 1 |
| New Mexico A&M | | – | | 5 | – | 3 | – | 1 |
| Hawaii | | – | | 5 | – | 4 | – | 0 |
| Santa Clara | | – | | 5 | – | 4 | – | 0 |
| St. Ignatius (CA) | | – | | 2 | – | 3 | – | 3 |
| Santa Barbara State | | – | | 2 | – | 4 | – | 0 |

The 1926 Arizona Wildcats football team represented the University of Arizona as an independent during the 1926 college football season. In their 12th season under head coach Pop McKale, the Wildcats compiled a 5–1–1 record, shut out four of seven opponents, and outscored all opponents, 143 to 18. The team captain was Robert E. Crouch.

In October 1926, Arizona's quarterback John "Button" Salmon died after being injured in a car crash. According to some reports, he told coach Pop McKale before dying: "Tell them.....tell the team to bear down." The phrase became the university's athletic motto.

== Schedule ==
| Date | Opponent | Site | Result | Source |
|---|---|---|---|---|
| October 9 | Phoenix Junior College | Tucson, AZ | W 54–0 | |
| October 16 | Tempe State | Tucson, AZ (rivalry) | W 35–0 | |
| October 22 | at New Mexico A&M | Las Cruces, NM | W 7–0 | |
| October 30 | Whittier^{†} | Tucson, AZ | W 16–6 | |
| November 6 | New Mexico | Tucson, AZ (rivalry) | W 21–0 | |
| November 13 | at Occidental | Los Angeles Memorial Coliseum; Los Angeles, CA | L 7–9 | |
| November 25 | Colorado Agricultural | Tucson, AZ | T 3–3 | |
^{†}Homecoming
