= 1926 New Mexico Lobos football team =

American college football season

1926 New Mexico Lobos football
- Conference: Independent
- Record: 4–2–1
- Head coach: Roy W. Johnson (7th season)
- Captain: Game captains
- Home stadium: University Field

1926 Western college football independents records
	Conf.			Overall
Team	W	L	T	W		L		T
Loyola (CA)		–		6	–	0	–	2
Arizona		–		5	–	1	–	1
Regis		–		6	–	2	–	0
Tempe State		–		4	–	1	–	1
Gonzaga		–		5	–	2	–	1
New Mexico		–		4	–	2	–	1
New Mexico A&M		–		5	–	3	–	1
Hawaii		–		5	–	4	–	0
Santa Clara		–		5	–	4	–	0
St. Ignatius (CA)		–		2	–	3	–	3
Santa Barbara State		–		2	–	4	–	0

The 1926 New Mexico Lobos football team represented the University of New Mexico as an independent during the 1926 college football season. In their seventh season under head coach Roy W. Johnson, the Lobos compiled a 4–2–1 record.

The season marked the beginning of a 13-game unbeaten streak (11 wins and 2 ties) and a 12-game home winning streak. Those streaks continued until October 13, 1928, and remain the longest in school history.

The team's 63-point loss to Texas A&M on October 16 was the third largest margin of defeat in school history to that date.

== Schedule ==
Date	Opponent	Site	Result	Attendance	Source
October 2	New Mexico Mines	University Field; Albuquerque, NM	W 20–0		
October 9	Montezuma College	University Field; Albuquerque, NM	W 41–7		
October 16	at Texas A&M	Kyle Field; College Station, TX	L 0–63		
October 23	Texas Mines^{†}	University Field; Albuquerque, NM	W 19–7		
November 6	at Arizona	Tucson, AZ (rivalry)	L 0–21		
November 13	at New Mexico A&M	Las Cruces, NM (rivalry)	T 6–6		
November 20	Western State (CO)	University Field; Albuquerque, NM	W 35–6		
^{†}Homecoming
