= 1926 Hawaii Rainbows football team =

American college football season

1926 Hawaii Rainbows football
- Conference: Independent
- Record: 5–4
- Head coach: Otto Klum (6th season)
- Home stadium: Moiliili Field; Honolulu Stadium

1926 Western college football independents records
	Conf.			Overall
Team	W	L	T	W		L		T
Loyola (CA)		–		6	–	0	–	2
Arizona		–		5	–	1	–	1
Regis		–		6	–	2	–	0
Tempe State		–		4	–	1	–	1
Gonzaga		–		5	–	2	–	1
New Mexico		–		4	–	2	–	1
New Mexico A&M		–		5	–	3	–	1
Hawaii		–		5	–	4	–	0
Santa Clara		–		5	–	4	–	0
St. Ignatius (CA)		–		2	–	3	–	3
Santa Barbara State		–		2	–	4	–	0

The 1926 Hawaii Rainbows football team represented the University of Hawaiʻi (now known as the University of Hawaiʻi at Mānoa) as an independent during the 1926 college football season. Led by sixth-year head coach Otto Klum, the Rainbows compiled an overall record of 5–4.

== Schedule ==
Date	Time	Opponent	Site	Result	Attendance	Source
October 2		8th Field Artillery	Moiliili Field; Honolulu, Territory of Hawaii	W 101–0		
October 9		Hawaii alumni	Moiliili Field; Honolulu, Territory of Hawaii	L 0–2		
October 16		Healani Athletic Club	Moiliili Field; Honolulu, Territory of Hawaii	W 101–0		
October 30		Hawaii National Guard	Moiliili Field; Honolulu, Territory of Hawaii	W 26–7		
November 11		Honolulu Town Team	Honolulu Stadium; Honolulu, Territory of Hawaii	L 7–14		
November 19		Pearl Harbor Navy	Honolulu Stadium; Honolulu, Territory of Hawaii	W 33–13		
December 4		Olympic Club	Honolulu Stadium; Honolulu, Territory of Hawaii	W 34–0	7,000	
December 18		Utah	Honolulu Stadium; Honolulu, Territory of Hawaii	L 7–17		
December 25	2:30 p.m.	South Dakota State	Honolulu Stadium; Honolulu, Territory of Hawaii	L 2–9	12,000	
All times are in Hawaii time
