= 1926 Regis Rangers football team =

American college football season

1926 Regis Rangers football
- Conference: Independent
- Record: 6–2
- Head coach: Tom McNamara

1926 Western college football independents records
	Conf.			Overall
Team	W	L	T	W		L		T
Loyola (CA)		–		6	–	0	–	2
Arizona		–		5	–	1	–	1
Regis		–		6	–	2	–	0
Tempe State		–		4	–	1	–	1
Gonzaga		–		5	–	2	–	1
New Mexico		–		4	–	2	–	1
New Mexico A&M		–		5	–	3	–	1
Hawaii		–		5	–	4	–	0
Santa Clara		–		5	–	4	–	0
St. Ignatius (CA)		–		2	–	3	–	3
Santa Barbara State		–		2	–	4	–	0

The 1926 Regis Rangers football team was an American football team that represented Regis College as an independent during the 1926 college football season. The team compiled a 6–2 record and outscored opponents by a total of 119 to 93. Tom McNamara was the head football coach.

== Schedule ==
Date	Opponent	Site	Result	Attendance	Source
September 25	Grand Island	Denver, CO	W 7–0		
October 2	at Colorado Agricultural	Colorado Field; Fort Collins, CO	L 0–39		
October 9	Nebraska Wesleyan	Denver, CO	W 13–6		
October 16	Bethany (KS)	Denver, CO	W 10–9		
October 23	Colorado Mines	Denver, CO	W 20–0		
October 23	South Dakota Mines	Rapid City, SD	W 26–0		
November 6	Creighton	Denver, CO	L 21–26		
November 20	Wyoming	Denver, CO	W 22–7		
