= 1926 Santa Clara Broncos football team =

American college football season

1926 Santa Clara Broncos football
- Conference: Independent
- Record: 5–4
- Head coach: Adam Walsh (2nd season)
- Captain: Len Casanova
- Home stadium: Mission Field

1926 Western college football independents records
	Conf.			Overall
Team	W	L	T	W		L		T
Loyola (CA)		–		6	–	0	–	2
Arizona		–		5	–	1	–	1
Regis		–		6	–	2	–	0
Tempe State		–		4	–	1	–	1
Gonzaga		–		5	–	2	–	1
New Mexico		–		4	–	2	–	1
New Mexico A&M		–		5	–	3	–	1
Hawaii		–		5	–	4	–	0
Santa Clara		–		5	–	4	–	0
St. Ignatius (CA)		–		2	–	3	–	3
Santa Barbara State		–		2	–	4	–	0

The 1926 Santa Clara Broncos football team was an American football team that represented Santa Clara University as an independent during the 1926 college football season. In their second season under head coach Adam Walsh, the Broncos compiled a 5–4 record and were outscored by opponents 147 to 101.

== Schedule ==
photographs from the November 27, 1926 game against the Saint Mary's Gaels

Date	Opponent	Site	Result	Attendance	Source
September 25	at California	California Memorial Stadium; Berkeley, CA	L 6–13	25,000	
October 2	at USC	Los Angeles Memorial Coliseum; Los Angeles, CA	L 0–42	36,000	
October 9	vs. Pacific (CA)	Santa Clara, CA	W 17–0		
October 17	at Olympic Club	Ewing Field; San Francisco, CA	W 14–0	7,000	
October 24	West Coast Army	Ewing Field; San Francisco, CA	W 30–6	7,000	
October 30	Nevada	Santa Clara, CA	W 25–0		
November 6	at Stanford	Stanford Stadium; Stanford, CA	L 14–33	18,000	
November 13	San Diego Marines	Mission Field; Santa Clara, CA	W 41–0		
November 27	Saint Mary's	Kezar Stadium, San Francisco, CA	L 0–7	21,000	
