= 1926 St. Ignatius Gray Fog football team =

American football team that represented St. Ignatius College

1926 St. Ignatius Gray Fog football
- Conference: Independent
- Record: 2–3–3
- Head coach: Jimmy Needles (3rd season)
- Home stadium: Ewing Field

1926 Western college football independents records
	Conf.			Overall
Team	W	L	T	W		L		T
Loyola (CA)		–		6	–	0	–	2
Arizona		–		5	–	1	–	1
Regis		–		6	–	2	–	0
Tempe State		–		4	–	1	–	1
Gonzaga		–		5	–	2	–	1
New Mexico		–		4	–	2	–	1
New Mexico A&M		–		5	–	3	–	1
Hawaii		–		5	–	4	–	0
Santa Clara		–		5	–	4	–	0
St. Ignatius (CA)		–		2	–	3	–	3
Santa Barbara State		–		2	–	4	–	0

The 1926 St. Ignatius Gray Fog football team was an American football team that represented St. Ignatius College (later renamed the University of San Francisco) as an independent during the 1926 college football season. In its third season under head coach Jimmy Needles, the Gray Fog compiled a 2–3–3 record and was outscored by a total of 95 to 32.

== Schedule ==
Date	Opponent	Site	Result	Attendance	Source
September 9	Olympic Club	Ewing Field; San Francisco, CA	T 0–0	7,500	
September 25	at Nevada	Mackay Field; Reno, NV	L 14–27		
October 3	Saint Mary's	Ewing Field; San Francisco, CA	L 0–38	10,000	
October 10	West Coast Army	Ewing Field; San Francisco, CA	L 0–27	5,000	
October 16	at Chico State	College Field; Chico, CA	W 6–0		
October 23	at San Diego Marine Base	San Diego, CA	T 0–0		
October 30	at Cal Aggies	Davis, CA	W 6–0		
November 25	Loyola (CA)	Ewing Field; San Francisco, CA	T 6–6		
