= 1926 Santa Barbara State Roadrunners football team =

American college football season

1926 Santa Barbara State Roadrunners football
- Conference: Independent
- Record: 2–4
- Head coach: Dudley DeGroot (1st season)
- Home stadium: Peabody Stadium

1926 Western college football independents records
	Conf.			Overall
Team	W	L	T	W		L		T
Loyola (CA)		–		6	–	0	–	2
Arizona		–		5	–	1	–	1
Regis		–		6	–	2	–	0
Tempe State		–		4	–	1	–	1
Gonzaga		–		5	–	2	–	1
New Mexico		–		4	–	2	–	1
New Mexico A&M		–		5	–	3	–	1
Hawaii		–		5	–	4	–	0
Santa Clara		–		5	–	4	–	0
St. Ignatius (CA)		–		2	–	3	–	3
Santa Barbara State		–		2	–	4	–	0

The 1926 Santa Barbara State Roadrunners football team represented Santa Barbara State (Note: University of California, Santa Barbara was known as Santa Barbara State College from 1921 to 1943.) during the 1926 college football season.

Santa Barbara State competed as an independent in 1926. Records may be incomplete, but six games have been documented. The Roadrunners were led by first-year head coach Dudley DeGroot and played home games at Peabody Stadium in Santa Barbara, California. They finished the season with a record of two wins and four losses (2–4). Overall, the team was outscored by its opponents 27–101 for the season and was shut out in four of the six games.

== Schedule ==
Date	Opponent	Site	Result	Attendance	Source
September 25	Southern Branch	Moore Field; Los Angeles, CA	L 0–25		
October 2	at Fresno State	Fresno State College Stadium; Fresno, CA	L 0–26		
October 16	at Loyola (CA)	Loyola Field; Los Angeles, CA	L 0–28		
October 22	Bakersfield	Peabody Stadium; Santa Barbara, CA	W 14–0		
October 29	California Christian (Note: Chapman University was known as California Christian College from 1920 to 1933.)	Peabody Stadium; Santa Barbara, CA	W 13–6		
November 6	at San Diego State	Navy "Sports" Field (Note: Navy "Sports" Field was the original name of what became Lane Field in downtown San Diego. It was converted to a baseball-only configuration in 1936.); San Diego, CA	L 0–16	3,500	
