= 1926 All-Pacific Coast football team =

American all-star college football team

The 1926 All-Pacific Coast football team consists of American football players chosen by various organizations for All-Pacific Coast teams for the 1926 college football season. The organizations selecting teams in 1926 included the Associated Press (AP) and the United Press (UP).

== All-Pacific Coast selections ==
=== Quarterbacks ===
- Bill Kelly, Montana (AP-1 [halfback]; UP-1 [quarterback])
- George Guttormsen, Washington (AP-1)
- Butch Meeker, Washington State (AP-2)

=== Halfbacks ===
- Mort Kaer, USC (AP-1; UP-1)
- Dick Hyland, Stanford (AP-2; UP-1)
- Underhill. St. Mary's (AP-2)

=== Fullbacks ===
- George Bogue, Stanford (AP-1; UP-1)
- Wes Schulmerich, Oregon Aggies (AP-2)

=== Ends ===
- Ted Shipkey, Stanford (AP-1; UP-1)
- Edgar Walker, Stanford (AP-1; UP-1 [tie])
- Red Badgro, USC (AP-2; UP-1 [tie])
- Leroy Schuh, Washington (AP-2)

=== Tackles ===
- Jim Dixon, Oregon Aggies (AP-1; UP-1)
- Jesse Hibbs, USC (AP-1)
- Sellman, Stanford (UP-1)
- Pat Wilson, Washington (AP-2)
- Hip Dickerson, Oregon Aggies (AP-2)

=== Guards ===
- Fred H. Swan, Stanford (AP-1; UP-1)
- Brice Taylor, USC (AP-1; UP-1)
- Fred Kramer, Washington State (AP-2)
- Ted Gorell, USC (AP-2)

=== Centers ===
- Larry Bettencourt, St. Mary's (AP-1) (College Football Hall of Fame)
- Jeff Cravath, USC (AP-2; UP-1)

== Key ==
AP = Associated Press

UP = United Press

== See also ==
- 1926 College Football All-America Team
