= Colorado State Rams football =

American college football team

2026 Colorado State Rams football team
- First season: 1892; 134 years ago
- Athletic director: John Weber
- Head coach: Jim Mora; 1st season, 3–7 (.300)
- Location: Fort Collins, Colorado
- Stadium: Canvas Stadium (capacity: 41,000)
- Field: Sonny Lubick Field
- NCAA division: Division I FBS
- Conference: Pac-12
- Colors: Green and gold
- All-time record: 549–631–33 (.466)
- Bowl record: 6–12 (.333)

Conference championships
- RMAC: 1915, 1916, 1919, 1920, 1925, 1927, 1933, 1934 Skyline: 1955 WAC: 1994, 1995, 1997 MWC: 1999, 2000, 2002
- Consensus All-Americans: 5
- Rivalries: Air Force (rivalry); Colorado (rivalry); Wyoming (rivalry)

Uniforms
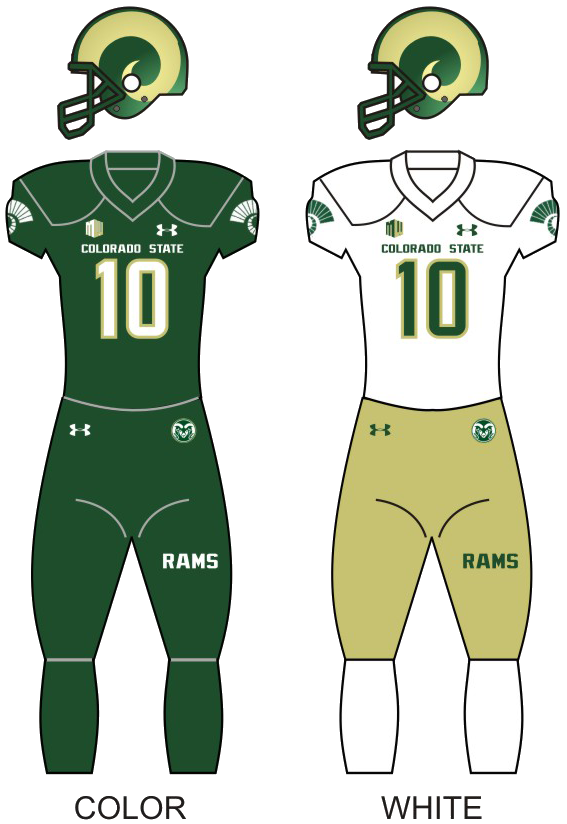
- Fight song: Stalwart Rams
- Mascot: CAM the Ram
- Outfitter: Adidas
- Website: CSURams.com

The Colorado State Rams football program represents Colorado State University and is a member of the NCAA Division I Football Bowl Subdivision and the Pac-12 Conference. The Rams have long-standing rivalries with Colorado, Wyoming, and Air Force. The team is currently led by head coach Jim Mora since he was hired on November 26, 2025.

The Rams have played their home games at Canvas Stadium since 2017. Previously, the team played 49 seasons (1968–2016) at Sonny Lubick Field at Hughes Stadium. The first game at Canvas Stadium (known as Colorado State Stadium for the 2017 season only) was played on August 26, 2017, when the Rams defeated the Oregon State Beavers 58–27.

== History ==
=== Early history (1893–1910) ===
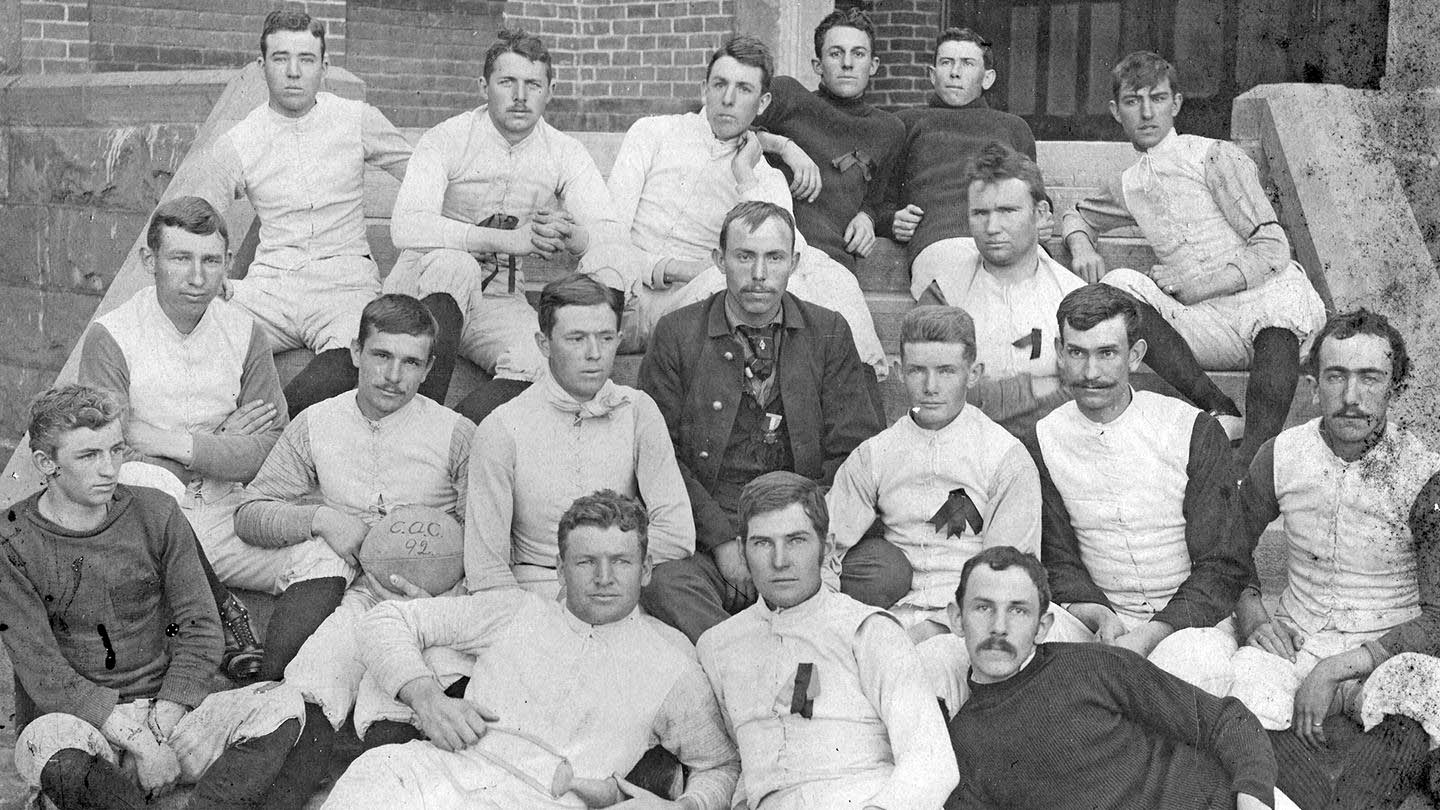
The inaugural team of 1893.

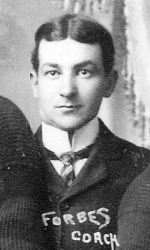
W. J. Forbes, the program's first ever head coach, in 1899.

On December 12, 1892, a student named F.O. Congdon and 18 of the other 179 students enrolled at Colorado Agricultural College at the time decided to form the school's first American football team and compete with other schools in the area. The team's nickname (that would later be changed to Aggies, then Rams) was the CACs, the school's acronym (Colorado Agricultural College).

Following Christmas break, the team found some men at a small private hybrid college/high school named Longmont Academy who would challenge the CAC team to play the first game in each school's history. The first game in school history took place on January 7, 1893, in Longmont, Colorado. Earlier that morning, Colorado Agricultural players and fans bought orange and green ribbons at a dry goods store in Longmont, choosing the school's colors.

The team continued competing without a head coach until 1894, when Colorado Agricultural College President Alston Ellis disbanded the team after one game in the 1894 season. The program returned upon Ellis's departure from the school in 1899 and named 25-year-old University of Vermont graduate W. J. Forbes to be the program's first ever football coach. Forbes led the 1899 team to a 0–2–1 record. On Thanksgiving Day, November 30, 1899, in the first ever game that Colorado Agricultural played outside of the state of Colorado (and their first ever game against Wyoming), a disagreement between officials from the two schools resulted in a controversial ending to the first ever Border War game.

At the time, officials were provided by the schools competing in the game. The game concluded with a Wyoming forfeit being called after Colorado Agricultural official Edward House ruled that Wyoming official E.D. McArthur and the Wyoming team were refusing to abide by the rulebook. After the forfeit was called and the Colorado Agricultural players began leaving the field, official McArthur reportedly exclaimed that he "did not give a damn for the rules" and instructed the Wyoming team to run in a touchdown. This action reportedly set off a brawl between the teams.

Following the game, Colorado Agricultural President Barton Aylesworth declared that his school would not play Wyoming in any athletic event until he received a written apology from the school. The two schools played again the following year, and there has remained bad blood between the two programs since. Per an NCAA rule that does not recognize forfeits in games that were incomplete, Colorado State University does not count the game as a victory in their record books.

Head coach W. J. Forbes died prior to the 1900 season in a freak accident on June 18, 1900. Forbes was succeeded by George Toomey who led the Rams to a record of 1–3 in the 1900 season. Between 1899 and 1910, the program recorded a dismal record of 14 wins and 35 losses with seven different men holding the position as head coach throughout the period.

=== Harry Hughes era (1911–1941, 1946) ===
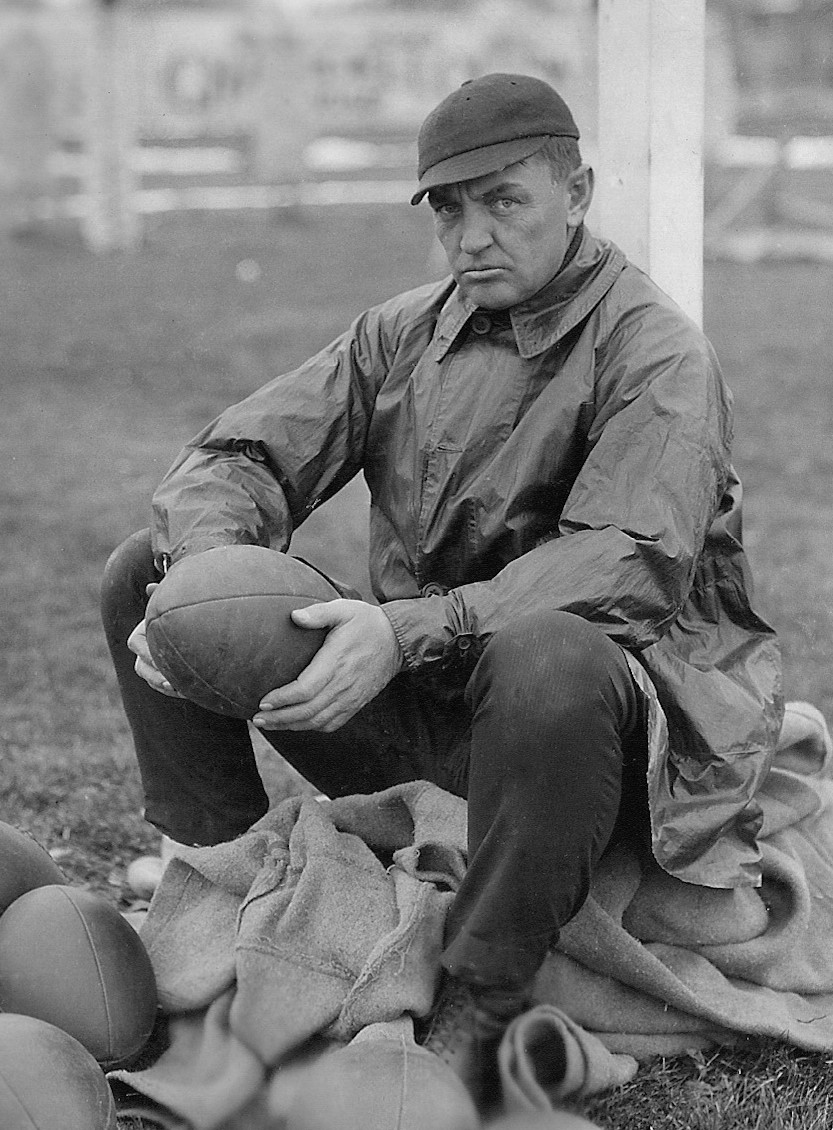
Harry Hughes was head coach of the Rams from 1911 to 1941, as well as in 1946.

Harry Hughes accepted the position of athletic director and head football coach at Colorado Agricultural University in 1911 and turned a winless team in 1911 into conference champions with an undefeated record in 1915. Hughes also helped build Colorado Field, the first sodded football field in Colorado history, replacing Durkee Field (1899–1911). Colorado Field was the home of the Colorado Agricultural/A&M Aggies and Colorado State Rams from 1912 to 1967.

Hughes won eight conference championships in the Rocky Mountain Conference in 1915, 1916, 1919, 1920, 1925, 1927, 1933, and 1934. He was a member of the NCAA National Rules Committee beginning in 1926 until his retirement. Hughes coached the Aggies from 1911 to 1941 in football and remained as the athletic director until his retirement in 1953. In the early 1930s, Hughes was given the nickname "Dean of American Football Coaches" by sportswriters and fellow coaches for his many seasons at one school. He was famously known as one of the most fair and sportsmanlike football coaches in America. He coached football from 1911 to 1941 and after resigning as football coach in 1946, he remained as the school's Athletic Director until 1953. Upon his retirement he was inducted into the Helms Football Hall of Fame on Harry Hughes Day, November 8, 1952.

Known as a tough but fair coach, Hughes was a strict disciplinarian who developed a play in 1914 known as the Million Dollar Play. This triple pass was an end around play based on the single wing formation and helped Hughes lead his teams to national fame. Some of Hughes's greatest players were Ralph "Sag" Robinson (All-American Honorable Mention 1916), Kenneth Hyde (1925 All-American 3rd team) and Glenn Morris (1936 US Olympic Decathlon Gold Medal winner). Hughes broke the color barrier in modern Colorado football in 1939 when he played John Mosley between 1939 and 1942.

During Hughes's hiatus from 1942 to 1945, the team was coached by Hughes's assistant coach Julius Wagner, although the university didn't field a team in 1943 and 1944 due to World War II.

When Colorado State University built a new football stadium in 1968, it was named Hughes Stadium in his honor. Hughes's final record at CSU was 126–92–18.

=== Bob Davis era (1947–1955) ===
Bob Davis succeeded Hughes on January 6, 1947.

Davis utilized the "T" formation and veterans returning from World War II to turn around a 2–7 Aggies team in 1946 to an 8–2 team in 1948; placing second in the Skyline Conference. Colorado A&M (as the school was then called) was invited to and played in the Raisin Bowl in Fresno, California, against Occidental College on January 1, 1949. Losing 21–20 in the last minutes of the game, Davis's 1949 team went on to a 9–1 record and placed second again. Davis utilized classroom football along with practice and game films to help his players excel. Davis also played black athletes at a predominantly white school such as Eddie Hanna, George Jones and Alex Burl.

Several of Davis's players went on to careers in the National Football League including Dale Dodrill, Thurman "Fum" McGraw, Jim David, Don Burroughs, Jack Christiansen, Alex Burl and Gary Glick. Three of his players were All-Americans: Thurman "Fum" McGraw (first team 1948, 1949), Harvey Achziger (first team 1952) and Gary Glick (second team 1955). Davis's 1955 team won the Skyline Conference championship but following the season he resigned from coaching football to concentrate on his duties as athletic director. Davis's record with the Rams when he left was 54–33–2.

=== Don Mullison era (1956–1961) ===
A player for Colorado A&M under Harry Hughes, Don Mullison was promoted from line coach to head coach when Bob Davis retired. However, the Rams freefell to a record of 19–40–1 in Mullison's six seasons, which included a winless 0–10 campaign in 1961. Mullison was not retained as head coach past the 1961 season.

The Mullison era would begin with a 2–7–1 mark in 1956, which included wins over Montana and New Mexico. In 1957, Mullison would lead the Rams to a 3–7 record, with wins over Denver, Montana and Air Force. The 1958 and 1959 seasons would see the Rams finish with a 6–4 record, the only two winning seasons of Mullison's tenure. In 1960, Mullison would lead the Rams to a 2–8 record, with wins over BYU and Drake. In 1961, the Rams would finish a winless 0–10.

=== Mike Lude era (1962–1969) ===
Delaware line coach Mike Lude was selected as Mullison's replacement, and under his tutelage, Colorado State, as they had switched from Colorado A & M, compiled a record of 29–51–1. In 1962, the Rams duplicated the previous year's mark of 0–10. In 1963, Lude led the Rams to a 3–7 record with wins over Pacific, UTEP and Montana. In 1964, the Rams posted their best record under Lude to that point, a 5–6 mark. In 1965, CSU finished 4–6. It was in 1966 that the best season of the Lude era would come for the Rams, with a record of 7–3 with wins over South Dakota State, Utah State, Air Force, No. 10 Wyoming, New Mexico, West Texas A&M and Iowa State. In 1967, the Rams slipped to 4–5–1 with wins over Utah State, Pacific, Emporia State and Wichita State. In 1968, the Rams would join the Western Athletic Conference and finish the season at 2–8. The inability for Lude to turn around the Rams led to his firing in 1969, a 4–6 campaign, after eight seasons.

=== Jerry Wampfler era (1970–1972) ===
The Rams continued to struggle under Lude's successor, Jerry Wampfler, who had arrived in Fort Collins as a prized line coach at Notre Dame under head coach Ara Parseghian. The Rams compiled a record of 8–25 before Wampfler resigned following the 1972 campaign.

In 1970, the Rams finished 4–7. The team began the season with a victory over New Mexico State, but then lost six straight with losses to No. 20 Arizona State, Iowa State, No. 10 Air Force, Wyoming, UTEP, and West Virginia. In Wampfler's second season, Colorado State went 3–8. The Rams lost their first eight games of the season, being beaten by BYU, Idaho, Wyoming, No. 12 Arizona State, Utah, No. 20 Air Force, Utah State, and Wichita State. The Rams finished the season on a three-game winning streak, defeating West Texas A&M, UTEP, and New Mexico State. In 1972, Wampfler's Rams finished with a dismal 1–10 record. CSU lost their first nine games of the season — losing three of the first four without scoring a single point — to Arizona, Iowa State, West Texas A&M, Utah State, No. 19 Air Force, Wyoming, Florida State, BYU, and Houston. Colorado State would finally win their first game of the season in their next-to-last contest, against UTEP, before dropping their final game of the season to Utah.

=== Sark Arslanian era (1973–1981) ===
Colorado State improved its performance under head coach Sark Arslanian, who came to Fort Collins from his post as head coach at Weber State. Despite a few down years, Arslanian's record at CSU was 45–47–4.

Arslanian led the Rams to a 5–6 record in his first season. After losing to Arizona to kick off the season, the Rams defeated BYU and New Mexico State. State then lost to No. 13 Arizona State then defeated Idaho. After losses to Utah State and Wyoming, Colorado State rang up 76 points in a dominant win against UTEP then defeated Toledo. Arslanian's Rams would close the season with losses to No. 15 Houston and New Mexico. In 1974, the Rams finished 4–6–1. CSU began the season with a loss to New Mexico then defeated Florida State before losing to Memphis, tying BYU and losing to Utah State. After crushing Nevada, the Rams lost to Arkansas, beat Wyoming, lost to Arizona beat UTEP and lost to Arizona State.

In Arslanian's third season, the Rams finished 6–5. The Rams kicked off the season against No. 12 Texas, losing the contest. CSU would then reel off four straight wins, defeating BYU, New Mexico, Wyoming and Oregon State. The Rams would lose to No. 11 Arizona State before defeating Air Force losing to Tennessee, beating UTEP and losing to No. 12 Arizona and Utah State. In 1976, the Rams would again finish 6–5. That year, CSU began the season with losses to Oregon and BYU before defeating Wichita State. After a loss to New Mexico, the Rams won five straight, defeating Utah State, Air Force, UTEP, Wyoming and Idaho. Losses to Arizona and Arizona State would cap the season.

The highlight of the Arslanian era came in 1977, when the Rams beat all odds and compiled a 9–2–1 record, their first such season in years. Despite the success, the Rams didn't get a bowl invite that season. In 1978, the Rams slipped to 5–6. That year, CSU lost three straight to start the year, Utah State, BYU and Utah. Back-to-back wins over UTEP and Air Force followed before CSU lost three straight; UNLV, Wyoming and San Diego State. Arslanian would lead the Rams to three straight wins to close the season; over New Mexico, West Virginia and Pacific.

In 1979, CSU went 4–7–1. The team's wins that season were over Wyoming, UTEP, San Diego State and Air Force. In 1980, Arslanian led the Rams to a 6–4–1 record for his fourth winning season at CSU. That season, CSU defeated Air Force, Arizona, New Mexico, San Diego State, Wyoming and UTEP. A poor start to the 1981 season cost Arslanian his job. He was fired after the Rams fell to 0–6 to start the season.

=== Leon Fuller era (1982–1988) ===
Texas defensive coordinator Leon Fuller, a Bear Bryant and Fred Akers disciple, took over the Rams football program in 1982. However, Fuller also struggled to find success. He went 25–55 through seven seasons and resigned under pressure after the Rams finished the 1988 season at 1–10.

In Fuller's first season, the Rams finished 4–7. That year, CSU would defeat Wyoming, New Mexico State, Air Force and UTEP. In 1983, Fuller led the Rams to a 5–7 record. Wins that year included Utah, San Diego State, UTEP, New Mexico and Northern Colorado. Fuller's third season saw the Rams finish 3–8. Colorado State would defeat Hawaii, New Mexico and UTEP. 1985 would bring a 5–7 record with wins over UTEP, New Mexico, Wyoming, Southern Miss and Utah. Losses included Colorado, No. 9 LSU, San Diego State, No. 15 BYU, No. 10 Air Force, Hawaii and No. 4 Miami. In 1986, the Rams finished 6–5, its best season under Fuller. CSU would defeat in-state archrival Colorado in the season opener as well as Northern Colorado, BYU, Hawaii, Wyoming and New Mexico Lobos football. The Rams would slip to 1–11 in 1987, with the lone win coming against New Mexico. The 1988 campaign would also result in one win, coming against San Diego State.

=== Earle Bruce era (1989–1992) ===
CSU next turned to a veteran head coach, hiring former Iowa State and Ohio State head coach Earle Bruce as Fuller's replacement in 1989. The move was praised by many across the country, who saw CSU as getting a seasoned, proven head coach who could restore success to CSU.

The Bruce era began in 1989, which resulted with the Rams compiling a 5–5–1 record. After losing the season opener to Tennessee and the second game to No. 9 Colorado, the Rams would defeat Cal State Fullerton then tie Eastern Michigan. After losing to No. 24 Air Force, CSU defeated New Mexico then lost to No. 25 BYU. The Rams then defeated Hawaii and Utah the next to week. A loss to Wyoming and a shutout win over UTEP would conclude the season. In his second season, Bruce led the Rams to a 9–4 record and a victory over Oregon in the Freedom Bowl, their first bowl appearance since 1948 and their first bowl victory ever. In his third season at Fort Collins, Bruce coached the Rams to a 3–8 record, which included wins over Arkansas State, Hawaii and UTEP. In 1992, Bruce led the Rams to a 17–14 victory over LSU in Baton Rouge. Colorado State would finish the 1992 season with a 5–7 record.

Bruce was fired after the 1992 season for, among other things, verbally and physically abusing his players and discouraging players from taking classes that conflicted with football practice.

=== Sonny Lubick era (1993–2007) ===
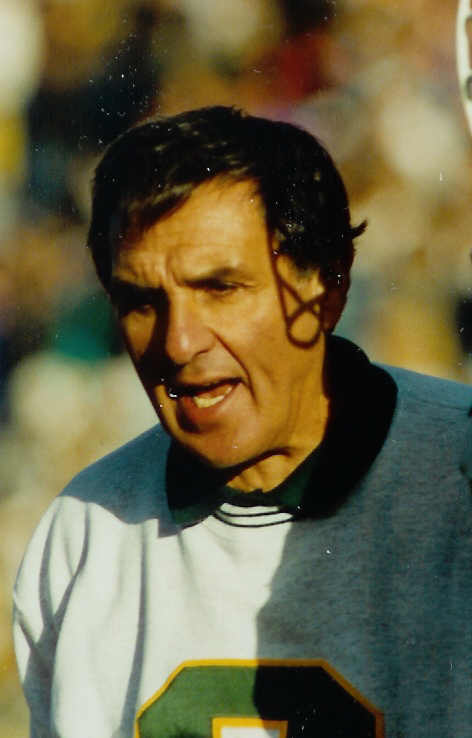
Sonny Lubick served as CSU's coach for 15 years.

1993-1998: Lubick's success & team turnaround

Sonny Lubick, who had previously served as defensive coordinator at Miami under head coach Dennis Erickson, took over the Rams as head coach in 1993. He inherited a program that had only two previous bowl appearances in their entire history before his arrival. Faced with a culture of losing, Lubick assembled a staff of assistants that included eventual Ohio State head coach Urban Meyer, and began aggressively recruiting and attempting to change CSU's image. He was already familiar with CSU, having served as offensive coordinator under Fuller from 1982 to 1984.

Considering the dreadful state of the program he'd inherited, Lubick made the Rams respectable fairly quickly. In his first season, the Rams overcame a 1–4 start to finish the season 5–6. While it was clear that Lubick had the Rams going in the right direction, he took the Rams to heights the program had never previously seen in 1994. Led by a defense that featured future NFL players Sean Moran and Brady Smith, they rolled to a then school-best 7–0 start, including a shocking 21–16 upset over No. 4 Arizona in Tucson, Arizona, the biggest upset in school history at the time. Late in the second half, Garrett Sand forced a fumble that Moran recovered and ran back 79 yards for a touchdown, a feat known among Ram fans as simply "The Play."

The streak ended with a 45–31 shootout loss to undefeated Utah before a then-record crowd of 39,107 at Hughes Stadium. The Rams recovered to win their final three games, including a dramatic 44–42 comeback win at Fresno State that sealed CSU's first ever outright WAC championship and first-ever trip to the Holiday Bowl in San Diego. Although the Rams lost 24–14 to Michigan, they still finished with a 10–2 record, setting a new school record for victories in a single season. The 10–2 campaign was the start of 10 straight winning seasons under Lubick, and also earned him National Coach of the Year honors from Sports Illustrated.

Lubick's Rams followed up their breakout campaign in 1994 with a strong 1995 season. With Smith earning WAC defensive player of the year honors, and safety Greg Myers earning All American honors for a second straight year, CSU finished the 1995 season with an 8–4 mark and a share of the WAC title. The Rams were once again invited to the Holiday Bowl, but this time they were downed by the Kansas State Wildcats by a score of 51–24. In 1996, the Rams posted another winning season, finishing 7–5 and tied for second place in the WAC. However, a lack of quality wins, and losses to Colorado, Oregon, Nebraska, and Wyoming kept the Rams out of a bowl game.

The Rams sputtered again to start 1997, losing 31–21 to archrival Colorado after leading at halftime and falling to Air Force 24-0 a week later. However, the Rams would not lose again that season. Led by quarterback Moses Moreno, the WAC Offensive Player of the Year, running back Kevin McDougal, and future Pittsburgh Steelers linebackers Joey Porter and Clark Haggans, the Rams were only seriously threatened once for the rest of the season, a 14–7 victory at Wyoming on October 18. After defeating New Mexico in the WAC Championship game, the Rams once again went to the Holiday Bowl, this time facing the Missouri Tigers. Down three at halftime, CSU scored 21 second half points to defeat the Tigers 35–24, netting Lubick his first ever bowl victory, extending a school record nine-game winning streak (the streak would be end at ten in 1998), and finishing what is still the greatest season in school history at 11–2.

In 1998, Lubick's Rams were left out of the postseason despite finishing 8–4 and third in the WAC.

The Mountain West Conference

1999-2002: Leaving the WAC and creation of the MWC

Prior to the 1999 season, Colorado State and seven other WAC schools, upset over conference expansion that threatened to balloon travel costs and break up longstanding regional rivalries, broke away from the conference and formed a new league, the Mountain West Conference. But 1999 would be memorable for Ram fans for another reason. Historically, the Rams had never been able to get the better of Colorado. Even with his success in rebuilding the program, Lubick had gone 0–3 in his first three games against Colorado. On September 4 the game, dubbed the Rocky Mountain Showdown, was played at a neutral site, Mile High Stadium in Denver for the second straight year, and the Rams were once again considered underdogs against the ranked Buffaloes. However, behind 189 rushing yards and two touchdowns from McDougal, the Rams blew out the Buffaloes 41–14, marking the first time in 13 years that CSU had beaten their in-state rivals. The victory was seen by many as the final step in CSU's ascension to legitimacy. Victories over Wyoming and Air Force also completed the "Front Range" sweep, and the Rams finished 8–4 again, this time tying for the Mountain West title. CSU was invited to the Liberty Bowl, but lost to Southern Miss 23–17. After the season, Lubick received a contract extension from CSU.

In 2000, Lubick's Rams, led primarily by Mountain West Conference Offensive Player of the Year Matt Newton, defeated Colorado for the second straight season by a score of 28–24. The victory was the catalyst for a 10–2 season that included an outright Mountain West title and a 22–17 Liberty Bowl victory over Louisville. With the graduation of several key seniors, and the preseason loss of starting running back Cecil Sapp to injury, Lubick faced a rebuilding year in 2001. The Rams still managed a 7–5 finish and a 45–20 New Orleans Bowl victory over North Texas.

2001 was also notable for the emergence of quarterback Bradlee Van Pelt. A transfer from Michigan State, Van Pelt's dual threat capability as a running and passing quarterback would make him a two-time conference player of the year. But it was his game in 2002 against Colorado that made Van Pelt a cult hero in Fort Collins. After losing to CU in 2001, Van Pelt and the Rams, bolstered by the return of Sapp, went into their Rocky Mountain Showdown heavy underdogs against a Buffaloes team ranked sixth in the nation. Trailing 14–13 late in the fourth quarter, Van Pelt broke loose on a 26-yard touchdown run. As he neared the goal line, Van Pelt turned and spiked the football off of CU cornerback Roderick Sneed's helmet as he scored what would be the game-winning touchdown. Following the game, Van Pelt called CU "the sorriest sixth-ranked team in the nation he had ever faced". It was the second biggest upset in school history, and further added to Van Pelt's following in Fort Collins. Though the outspoken quarterback occasionally gave Lubick problems, the 2002 season would be another banner season. With Sapp setting the school single season rushing record, the Rams finished 2002 with a 10–4 record and another Mountain West Conference title.

2003-2006: Struggles and underperforming expectations

The 2003 Ram football team was considered by many to be the best team in Lubick's tenure, if not all of CSU history, prior to the season. Though Sapp was gone, Van Pelt and many other seniors returned, and high-profile Colorado-transfer Marcus Houston was added to the mix. The Rams entered the season ranked 24th in the nation and with hopes of cracking the Bowl Championship Series. Those hopes were quickly dashed when the Rams were upset in their opener by CU 42–35. The Rams recovered to finish 7-6 and make a bowl game for the fifth year in a row.

Although it was not apparent at the time, Lubick's tenure had crested. With Van Pelt gone, CSU faced another rebuilding year in 2004. A particularly devastating loss at Folsom Field against Colorado on September 4, in which Lubick later admitted to mismanaging CSU's final series that ended in the Rams failing in three plays from CU's one yard line to score what would have been a game-winning touchdown in a 27–24 loss, led to a 4–7 finish, the worst year in Lubick's tenure.

The 2005 season started once again with another devastating loss at Colorado on September 3. Leading 21–10 after three quarters, three interceptions allowed CU to tie the game, and Mason Crosby kicked a game-winning 47-yard field goal with five seconds left to give the Buffs a 31–28 win. This time the Rams regrouped. Behind school record setting wide receiver David Anderson, and buoyed by the surprising emergence of thousand yard sophomore running back Kyle Bell, CSU finished the regular season 6–5 and tied for second place in the Mountain West. However, a blowout 56–32 loss to Navy in the Poinsettia Bowl seemed to be another setback.

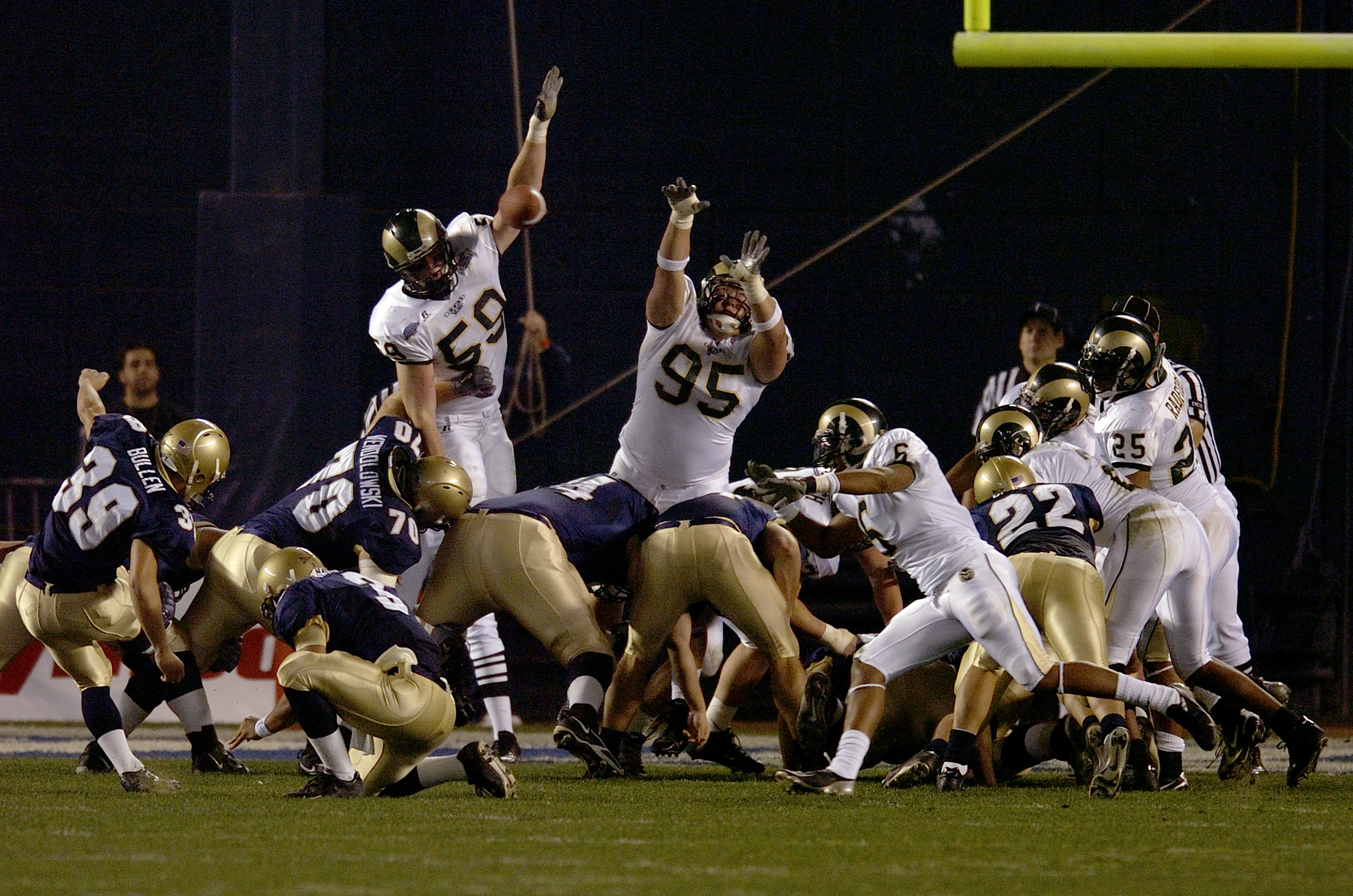
The Rams blocking a field goal during the Poinsettia Bowl

Following the 2005 season, Lubick signed a three-year contract extension that would have made him CSU's coach through the 2009 season. It was the second contract extension Lubick received at CSU. Unfortunately, the Lubick family was dealt a difficult blow in the off-season. In February, Lubick's youngest son, Marc, was diagnosed with Rhabdomyosarcoma cancer. The younger Lubick had just finished his first season as Colorado State's wide receivers coach, a position he took over after his brother Matt left the program in 2005 after spending the previous four seasons coaching that position under his father. Marc Lubick underwent chemotherapy and coached during the 2006 season.

The Rams entered the 2006 season with high hopes, but on and off field problems quickly beset the program. Just three days prior to the season opening game against Weber State on September 2, preseason all-conference back Kyle Bell was lost for the season with a torn ACL during a practice. A sophomore in 2005, Bell had run for over 1,000 yards and figured to be the centerpiece in CSU's offense. The Rams defeated Weber State 30–6, but lost another starter prior to their game against archrival Colorado on September 9, this time due to scandal. Several players, including preseason All-MWC cornerback Robert Herbert, were suspended indefinitely from the program after being charged with fraud in a campus check-cashing scandal.

Despite these losses, however, the Rams started the 2006 season strong. On September 9, after three years of frustratingly close losses, the Rams defeated their in-state rival CU by a score of 14–10 at Invesco Field at Mile High Stadium. After dropping a 28–10 decision at Nevada the following week, CSU rebounded with a road win at Fresno State and a homecoming win against UNLV to go to 4–1. Playing at in-state rival Air Force on October 12, the Rams opened up a 21–3 halftime lead and appeared to be well on their way to a fifth victory. However, the Falcons rallied for 21 unanswered points and came back to defeat CSU 24–21. The loss was the beginning of one of the worst slides in Lubick's tenure. The following week Colorado State was shut out 24–0 at Wyoming in the annual Border War series. Home losses to New Mexico and BYU followed, and the Rams ultimately never recovered. Losses to Utah, TCU, and San Diego State concluded a season-ending, seven-game losing streak, leaving CSU 4–8 and tied for last place in the Mountain West, by far the worst year in Lubick's tenure and leading some fans and followers to question whether Lubick should be retained or let go, however, CSU decided to stick with its longtime coach.

2007: The end of the Lubick era

Lubick's 14th season got an immediate boost with the return of Bell. With their all-conference halfback in the fold, as well as the most seniors returning in Lubick's tenure, the Rams had a team that figured to rebound from the dismal 2006 season. But a difficult early schedule challenged CSU. Opening against Colorado at Invesco Field at Mile High, the Rams had a familiar finish against their in-state rival. Despite big games from Bell and Kory Sperry, CSU squandered an 11-point 3rd quarter lead and went into overtime. On their first possession, CSU quarterback Caleb Hanie threw an interception in the endzone. CU would win in overtime, 31–28.

Following the CU loss, Colorado State faced one of its most daunting home games ever against then-10th ranked California. The Bears were heavily favored but Colorado State, playing in its home opener, was game. CSU lost a thriller 34–28, their 9th straight loss dating back to 2006. Even worse, the bizarre chain of season-ending ACL injuries to key players continued when Sperry was lost with a torn ACL during the game. It was the 3rd straight season a key player for the Rams had been lost to the injury. Losses continued to mount. Dating back to 2006, CSU lost 11 straight games before defeating UNLV at mid season. Colorado State finished the season 3–9, a new low in the Lubick tenure. The lone bright spot of the year came at the end of the season when the Rams regained the Bronze Boot with a 36–28 win over Wyoming at Hughes Stadium. It would end up being the final game in Lubick's tenure at CSU.

On November 26, 2007, just 3 days after the Wyoming win, it was announced that Lubick was being relieved of his duties as head football coach. Colorado State University athletic director Paul Kowalczyk announced that Lubick has been offered a public relations position as senior associate athletic director, focused on fundraising and serving as a goodwill ambassador for Rams athletics. Lubick was replaced by Steve Fairchild, a former Lubick assistant who returned after serving as offensive coordinator for the NFL's Buffalo Bills.

On February 2, 2008, the Rocky Mountain News reported that Lubick had declined the university's offer to remain in a fundraising role. The paper quoted a source as saying Lubick, 70, had talked with Florida coach Urban Meyer about joining the Gators's staff. Meyer served as wide receivers coach under Lubick in the early 1990s. The job was reported to involve breaking down film and helping with recruiting. However, Lubick did not take that job.

Lubick won nearly 75% of home games in the stadium whose playing surface would bear his name, leading the team to six conference titles and a 108–74 record. CSU was consistently a top 25 contender from 1994 to 2002, with a 79–32 record during that period and 3 top 25 finishes. Lubick, conference coach of the year four times, coached former Denver Broncos Cecil Sapp and current Buffalo Bills offensive tackle Erik Pears, and All-Pro NFL linebacker Joey Porter.

=== Steve Fairchild era (2008–2011) ===
In December 2007, Colorado State University announced that the National Football League's Buffalo Bills offensive coordinator Steve Fairchild would be returning to his alma mater to serve as head coach.

CSU surprised in its first year under Fairchild. After a 38–17 loss to Colorado in his debut, Fairchild got his first win with CSU, a home victory over Sacramento State 23–20 thanks to a Ben DeLine field goal. The Rams followed that up with a 28–25 win over Houston one week later. However, CSU would lose 5 of their next 7 games, including tight home losses to conference powers TCU (13–7) and BYU (45–42). CSU rallied to win their final two games, with their 31–20 victory at Wyoming, securing their sixth win and a berth in the New Mexico Bowl. Underdogs to Fresno State, CSU won a 40–35 thriller for their first bowl victory since the 2001 New Orleans Bowl. The star of the game (and most of the season) was senior RB Gartrell Johnson, who ran for a career-high 285 yards and added 90 receiving yards. His 375 total yards were the most for one player in bowl history. He ran for two touchdowns, the final being a game winning 77-yard touchdown run in the fourth quarter. Johnson would be named first team all-MWC following the season. Fairchild became the first coach in CSU history to post a winning season in his first year with the program.

Despite graduating Johnson and several other seniors, 2009 started much the way 2008 ended. The Rams opened the season September 6 at arch-rival Colorado. With a bevy of returning starters, and the game being played in Boulder for the final time (both schools had agreed to play the next decade's worth of games at Invesco Field at Mile High Stadium), the Buffs were heavy favorites. However, CSU led from start to finish, beating Colorado 23–17, marking their first victory at Folsom Field since 1986. Following home victories over Weber State and Nevada, the 3–0 Rams appeared headed to postseason yet again. However, the season would derail quickly. Following a 42–23 loss at BYU, the Rams dropped a 31–29 decision at Idaho followed by 24–17 home defeat to Utah. They were the first of four losses that would come by seven points or less. The Rams would not win another game for the rest of the season. A loss to previously winless New Mexico (29–27) assured CSU of a last place finish, and a 17–16 home defeat to Wyoming the day after Thanksgiving not only cost the Rams the Bronze Boot (and their first home loss to Wyoming in 12 years), but made CSU just the 3rd team in Mountain West Conference history to go winless in conference play (Wyoming having done so in 2000 and 2001). CSU finished the season with a 3–9 record.

2010 was just as miserable. The Rams finished with an identical 3–9 record with their lone wins home victories over lowly Idaho, New Mexico and UNLV. Blowouts were frequent and the most embarrassing came in the season's final two games. On senior day the Rams were shelled by BYU 49–10. The following week they concluded their season with a 44–0 drubbing by rival Wyoming in the Border War. Wyoming hadn't won a single conference game until that dominating win over Colorado State.

It was hoped that Colorado State would begin to turn the corner in 2011, Fairchild's fourth year. Despite a 28–14 loss to rival Colorado, the Rams started 3–1 highlighted by a dramatic 35–34 comeback win in double overtime at Utah State on September 24. It would be CSU's final win. The following week CSU fell 38–31 to San Jose State on homecoming, the start of an 8-game losing streak. Fairchild was fired by new athletic director Jack Graham on December 4, 2011, one day after his Rams lost to the Wyoming Cowboys in the Border War. It was their third straight loss to Wyoming and the third straight time CSU finished their season 3–9.

=== Jim McElwain era (2012–2014) ===
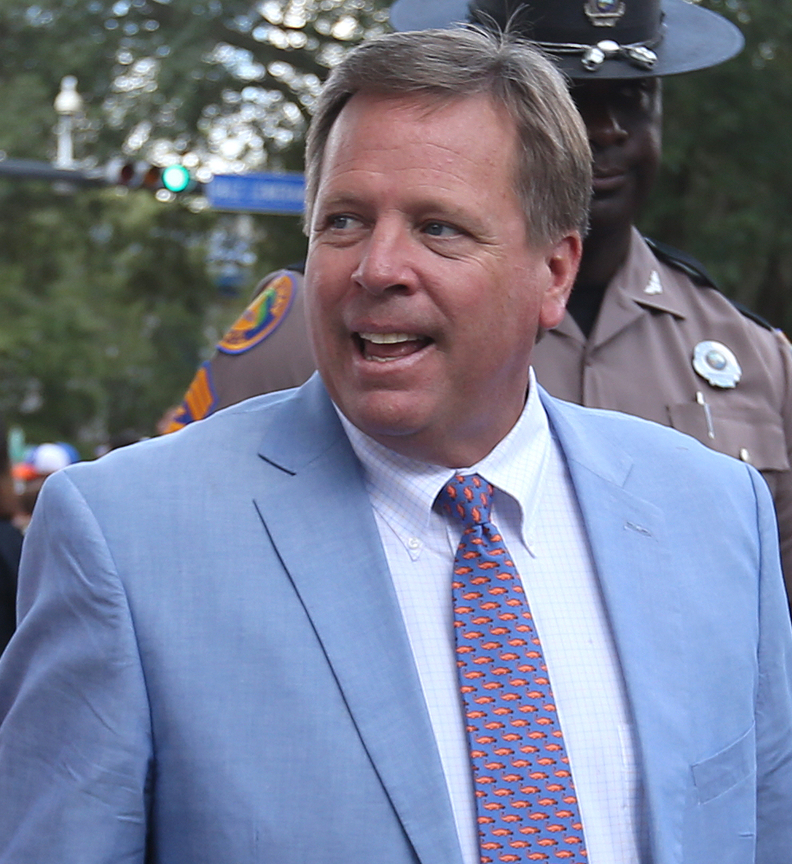
Jim McElwain was appointed as coach in 2011, serving for two seasons.

On December 12, 2011, Alabama offensive coordinator Jim McElwain was formally introduced as Fairchild's replacement. The hiring was well-received, as McElwain had won two national championships at Alabama as offensive coordinator under head coach Nick Saban.

McElwain's tenure, dubbed by the school's athletic department as "A Bold New Era", began the 2012 season on a high note. McElwain's Rams rallied from an 11-point deficit to defeat arch-rival Colorado by a score of 22–17 at Sports Authority Field in Denver on September 1. McElwain became the first CSU coach to win his debut since Jerry Wampfler in 1970 and the first to ever win his debut against CU. The momentum didn't last long, though, as CSU suffered a 22–7 setback in their home opener one week later to defending FCS national champion North Dakota State, the start of a six-game losing skid. The program showed improvement towards the end of the season, winning three of their final five games to finish 4–8 in McElwain's first season.

McElwain's second season with CSU was much more successful. CSU began the season losing their first two games, both of which they had led in the 4th quarter. Colorado State would also lose to Alabama by a score of 31–6 on September 22. However, CSU finished the season winning 8 of its final 11 games. McElwain finished his second season with a record of 8–6 after CSU's miraculous comeback win over Washington State in the New Mexico Bowl.

CSU's third season under McElwain led to even greater accomplishments. After a Week 2 loss at Boise State, the Rams, led by star quarterback Garrett Grayson and star wide receiver Rashard Higgins, reeled off 9 straight wins, climbing as high as No. 21 in the national rankings, and being in the conversation for a possible New Year's Day bowl bid. Those hopes were dashed, however, in their final regular season game at Air Force, when the Falcons hit a game-winning field goal as time expired, defeating the Rams. The loss capped CSU's regular season at 10–2. As a result of the successful transformation of the program, McElwain was named the Mountain West Conference's coach of the year on December 2, 2014.

Before the final bowl game after the 2014 regular season, McElwain accepted the position of head football coach at Florida, becoming the first Rams football coach to leave the team for another. Offensive coordinator Dave Baldwin, former head coach at San Jose State, was named as the Rams interim head coach for the bowl game. McElwain did not coach the Rams in their final match, a loss in the Las Vegas Bowl to Utah.

=== Mike Bobo era (2015–2019) ===
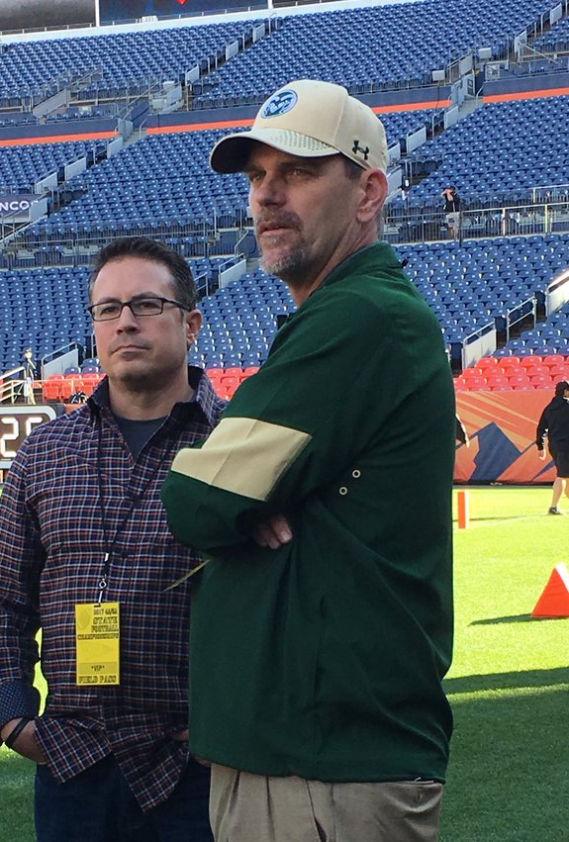
Mike Bobo

On December 23, 2014, Georgia offensive coordinator Mike Bobo was named the head football coach at Colorado State University. His hiring marked the second straight SEC offensive coordinator to lead the Rams football program.

2015-2017: Three 7–6 seasons

In Bobo's first season, the Rams compiled a record of 7–6, which culminated in a loss to Nevada in the Arizona Bowl. After demolishing Savannah State by a score of 65–13 to kick off the season, the Rams lost to Minnesota and Colorado in overtime in consecutive weeks. After defeating UTSA, the Rams suffered another two-game skid, losing at Utah State and No. 25 Boise State. CSU then defeated Air Force and lost to San Diego State before embarking upon a four-game winning streak. The Rams defeated Wyoming, UNLV, New Mexico and Fresno State before losing in the Arizona Bowl.

In 2016, the Rams again finished 7–6. After losing to Colorado by a score of 44–7 to kick off the season, the Rams defeated UTSA and Northern Colorado. CSU would follow that up with losses to Minnesota and Wyoming. Bobo led the Rams to a victory over Utah State the following week, but the Rams suffered a defeat at the hands of No. 15 Boise State the next week. Wins over UNLV and Fresno State would follow before CSU lost at Air Force. Colorado State would then defeat New Mexico and San Diego State by large margins before losing to Idaho in the Famous Idaho Potato Bowl by a score of 61–50.

The 2017 season began on August 26 when the Rams hosted Oregon State for the grand opening of CSU's new on-campus Canvas Stadium (called "Colorado State Stadium" for the 2017 season). The Rams beat the Beavers 58–27 in front of a crowd of 37,583, which remains the highest attendance for a football game at Canvas Stadium as of the 2021 season. On September 1, 2017, CSU lost to Colorado 17–3 in the year's Rocky Mountain Showdown matchup. On October 14, 2017, CSU won a close homecoming game against Nevada, 44–42, behind Michael Gallup's 263 receiving yards. On December 16, 2017, CSU lost the New Mexico Bowl to Marshall, 31–28. After achieving an impressive 6–2 record through eight games, the Rams lost four of their last five games, including the New Mexico Bowl, to finish the season with a 7–6 record for the third consecutive year.

2018-2019: Struggles and Bobo's departure

The 2018 season began with losses to Hawaii and Colorado. On September 8, 2018, CSU beat Arkansas at Canvas Stadium after scoring 25 unanswered points to come back and win 34–27. CSU then lost games against Florida and Illinois State and won games against San Jose State and New Mexico before losing five straight games to conclude the season. The Rams finished the 2018 campaign with a 3–9 record and missed out on a bowl game for the first time in 5 years.

The 2019 season began with a 52–31 loss against Colorado in what would end up being the final Rocky Mountain Showdown until September 16, 2023. The following week, CSU beat Western Illinois and then proceeded to lose four games in a row. CSU split their final six games 3–3, and finished the 2019 season with a 4–8 record. On December 4, 2019, it was announced that head coach Mike Bobo and the Colorado State team had mutually agreed to part ways, ending Bobo's five-year run at CSU.

=== Steve Addazio era (2020–2021) ===
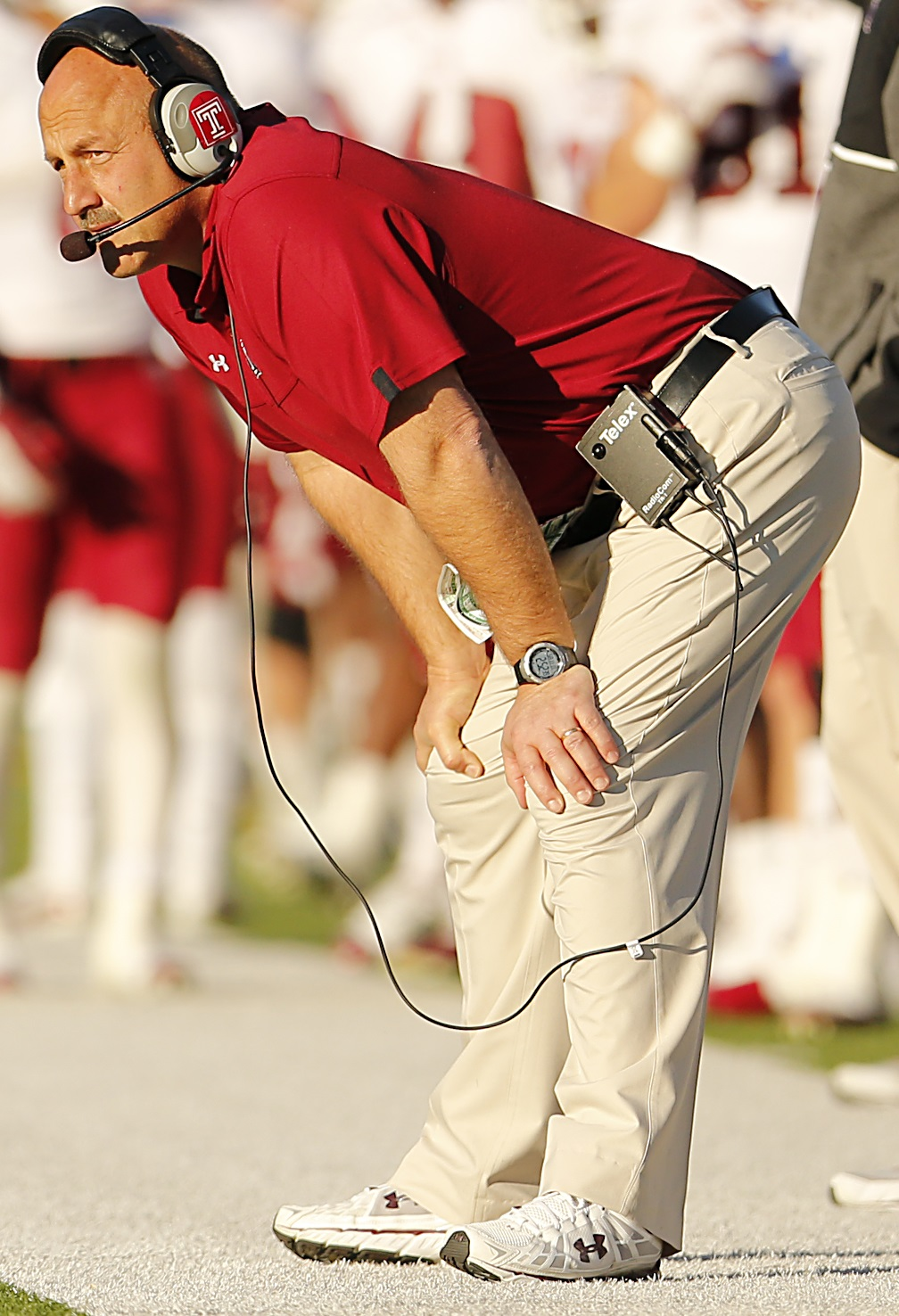
Steve Addazio in 2012

On December 11, 2019, former Temple and Boston College head coach Steve Addazio was named the new head coach of the Rams. Addazio brought his classic, conservative smashmouth offensive style to Colorado State, putting an emphasis on the run game.

2020: COVID-19 season

Addazio's first season as the head coach of the Rams was anything but predictable as a result of the COVID-19 pandemic. After the Mountain West Conference indefinitely postponed all fall sports on August 10, 2020, the conference agreed to play a modified eight-game, conference-only football season. Despite eight games being scheduled, Colorado State played only four games due to COVID-19 outbreaks leading to game cancellations.

In August 2020, the university temporarily suspended the football program and initiated investigations into accusations of racism and verbal abuse of players by the coaching staff. However, the subsequent investigation found that the majority of athletes and staff disputed these accusations, and in October 2020, the investigation concluded and the team was cleared.

On November 5, 2020, Colorado State beat Wyoming 34–24, winning the Border War Bronze Boot back from Wyoming for the first time since the 2015 football season.

Colorado State finished the 2020 season with a 1–3 record, with their only victory being against Wyoming. Colorado State lost to Fresno State, Boise State and San Diego State, while games against New Mexico, UNLV, Air Force and Utah State were canceled. There were no fans allowed at CSU's Canvas Stadium at any point of the season due to the COVID-19 pandemic.

2021 season

The 2021 football season was a welcome change after the unusual previous season resulted in playing only four games and without fans. Fans were welcomed back to Canvas Stadium on September 3, 2021, when the Rams hosted South Dakota State in front of an electric crowd of 32,327. However, SDSU spoiled the occasion, winning 42–23. After another embarrassing home loss to Vanderbilt the following week and beginning the season 0–2, the Rams went on the road and beat Toledo 22–6. Star TE Trey McBride recorded nine catches for 109 receiving yards on a team-total 110 passing yards; only two passes were completed to other receivers, and one was for a three-yard loss. On September 25, 2021, the following weekend, CSU nearly upset #5 ranked Iowa - Rams led 14–7 at half - but ultimately lost 24–14.

On October 9, 2021, CSU hosted 2020 Mountain West Champion San Jose State for the Rams' homecoming game. CSU won 32–14 in front of a near-sellout crowd of 34,780, and kicker Cayden Camper made six field goals on six attempts, breaking the school's single game record for made field goals. The following week, CSU beat New Mexico on the road 36–7 with a dominant defensive performance, allowing the Lobos just 76 yards of offense, the second fewest allowed by the Rams in a game in school history.

On October 22, 2021, CSU lost to Utah State 26–24 in the final seconds of the game due to a substitution mishap that forced Rams' kicker Cayden Camper to rush a field goal rather than stopping the clock to let him set up the kick. Following the game, head coach Steve Addazio deflected blame onto his players, saying that no coach had instructed the Special teams unit to substitute into the game. This loss became the first of a six-game losing streak as the Rams failed to win another game that season, finishing the season 3–9, 2–6 in Mountain West Conference play. In Addazio's final game as head coach of the Rams, he was ejected from a game against Nevada after receiving two unsportsmanlike conduct penalties, becoming the second ever FBS coach to be ejected since the unsportsmanlike conduct rules were updated in 2016. Nevada beat Colorado State 52–10, handing the Rams their worst loss of the season. On December 2, 2021, Colorado State fired Steve Addazio after he posted a 4–12 record over two years as head coach.

=== Jay Norvell era (2022–2025) ===
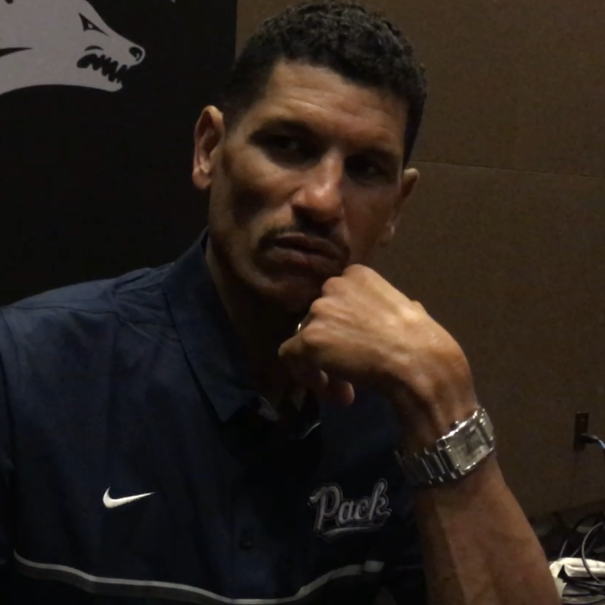
Jay Norvell in 2017 as head coach of Nevada

On December 6, 2021, Colorado State hired Nevada head coach Jay Norvell to be their 24th head coach and first Black head coach in program history. In a stark contrast to previous head coach Steve Addazio's run-heavy smashmouth offense, Norvell was known for leading an explosive, pass-heavy offense. Norvell led Nevada quarterback Carson Strong to back-to-back Mountain West Conference Offensive Player of the Year awards in 2020 and 2021. Norvell was fired during the 2025 season and was replaced by Jim Mora for the 2026 season.

== Conference affiliations ==
The Rams have played in 6 different conferences after joining the Pac-12 in 2026.

- Colorado Football Association (1893–1908)
- Rocky Mountain Athletic Conference (1909–1937)
- Skyline Conference (1938–1961)
- Independent (1962–1967)
- Western Athletic Conference (1968–1998)
- Mountain West Conference (1999–2026)
- Pac-12 Conference (2026–present)

== Head coaches ==
W. J. Forbes was the program's first football coach. He was paid $25 for his services during the 1899 season. Forbes died in a freak accident following his only season as head coach on June 18, 1900, at 25 years old.

Head coach Sark Arslanian was fired after the Rams opened the 1981 season with a 0–6 record, ending his nine-year tenure with a 46–46–4 record. Defensive coordinator Chester Caddas was named as the team's interim head coach and led the team to an 0–6 record, finishing the season winless. Caddas was replaced by Texas defensive coordinator Leon Fuller after the 1981 season.

Head coach Jim McElwain left the program after being offered the head coach position at Florida following the 2014 season. Offensive coordinator Dave Baldwin coached the Rams as interim head coach for one game, in the 2014 Las Vegas Bowl the team played in following McElwain's departure.

On December 6, 2021, Colorado State hired Nevada head coach Jay Norvell to be their 24th head coach and first Black head coach in program history. He was fired on October 19, 2025, after a 2–5 start to the season.

== Bowl games ==
Colorado State has played in 18 bowl games. They have a bowl record of 6–12.

Season	Coach	Bowl	Opponent	Result
1948	Bob Davis	Raisin Bowl	Occidental	L 20–21
1990	Earle Bruce	Freedom Bowl	Oregon	W 32–31
1994	Sonny Lubick	Holiday Bowl	Michigan	L 14–24
1995	Sonny Lubick	Holiday Bowl	Kansas State	L 21–54
1997	Sonny Lubick	Holiday Bowl	Missouri	W 35–24
1999	Sonny Lubick	Liberty Bowl	Southern Miss	L 17–23
2000	Sonny Lubick	Liberty Bowl	Louisville	W 22–17
2001	Sonny Lubick	New Orleans Bowl	North Texas	W 45–20
2002	Sonny Lubick	Liberty Bowl	TCU	L 3–17
2003	Sonny Lubick	San Francisco Bowl	Boston College	L 21–35
2005	Sonny Lubick	Poinsettia Bowl	Navy	L 30–51
2008	Steve Fairchild	New Mexico Bowl	Fresno State	W 40–35
2013	Jim McElwain	New Mexico Bowl	Washington State	W 48–45
2014	Dave Baldwin (interim)	Las Vegas Bowl	Utah	L 10–45
2015	Mike Bobo	Arizona Bowl	Nevada	L 23–28
2016	Mike Bobo	Famous Idaho Potato Bowl	Idaho	L 50–61
2017	Mike Bobo	New Mexico Bowl	Marshall	L 28–31
2024	Jay Norvell	Arizona Bowl	Miami (OH)	L 17–43

Under Sonny Lubick, the Rams played in their two of their biggest bowl games to date. The first was the 1997 Holiday Bowl 35–24 victory over the Missouri Tigers while the second was the 2000 Liberty Bowl 22–17 victory over the Louisville Cardinals. During both of these winning seasons, the Rams were ranked in the top 25 football teams by both the coaches and AP polls.

In the first season under new head coach Steve Fairchild, the CSU Rams were able to beat Fresno State 40–25 in the 2008 New Mexico Bowl. During this game, running back Gartrell Johnson rushed for 285 yards and received five passes for 90 yards for a total of 375 yards, setting an FBS record for most combined rushing and receiving yards in a bowl game.

Under Jim McElwain's second year of coaching the Rams, CSU went to the New Mexico Bowl. On December 21, 2013, the CSU Rams faced the Washington State Cougars. In one of the most memorable comebacks of the decade, the Rams were able to score 18 points in the last 4 minutes of regulation game play to defeat the Cougars 48–45.

The Rams appeared in three bowls during the Mike Bobo era — the Arizona Bowl, the Famous Idaho Potato Bowl, and the New Mexico Bowl — but lost all three games.

Colorado State faced Miami University in the 2024 Arizona Bowl, their first since 2017, where they lost 17–43. This marked their fifth straight loss in a bowl game, and extended their bowl game victory drought to 11 years.

== Conference championships ==
The Rams have won 15 conference championships (four shared, 11 outright), eight occurring during their tenure in the Rocky Mountain Athletic Conference, one in the Skyline Conference, three in their time in the Western Athletic Conference, and three in the Mountain West Conference.

Year	Conference	Coach	Overall record	Conf. record
1915	Rocky Mountain Athletic Conference	Harry W. Hughes	7–0	7–0
1916	Rocky Mountain Athletic Conference	Harry W. Hughes	6–0–1	6–0–1
1919	Rocky Mountain Athletic Conference	Harry W. Hughes	7–1	7–1
1920	Rocky Mountain Athletic Conference	Harry W. Hughes	6–1–1	6–0–1
1925	Rocky Mountain Athletic Conference	Harry W. Hughes	9–1	8–0
1927	Rocky Mountain Athletic Conference	Harry W. Hughes	7–1	7–1
1933†	Rocky Mountain Athletic Conference	Harry W. Hughes	5–1–1	5–1–1
1934†	Rocky Mountain Athletic Conference	Harry W. Hughes	6–2–1	6–1–1
1955	Skyline Conference	Bob Davis	8–2	6–1
1994	Western Athletic Conference	Sonny Lubick	10–2	7–1
1995†	Western Athletic Conference	Sonny Lubick	8–4	6–2
1997	Western Athletic Conference	Sonny Lubick	11–2	7–1
1999†	Mountain West Conference	Sonny Lubick	8–4	5–2
2000	Mountain West Conference	Sonny Lubick	10–2	7–1
2002	Mountain West Conference	Sonny Lubick	10–4	6–1

† co-champion

== Rivalries ==
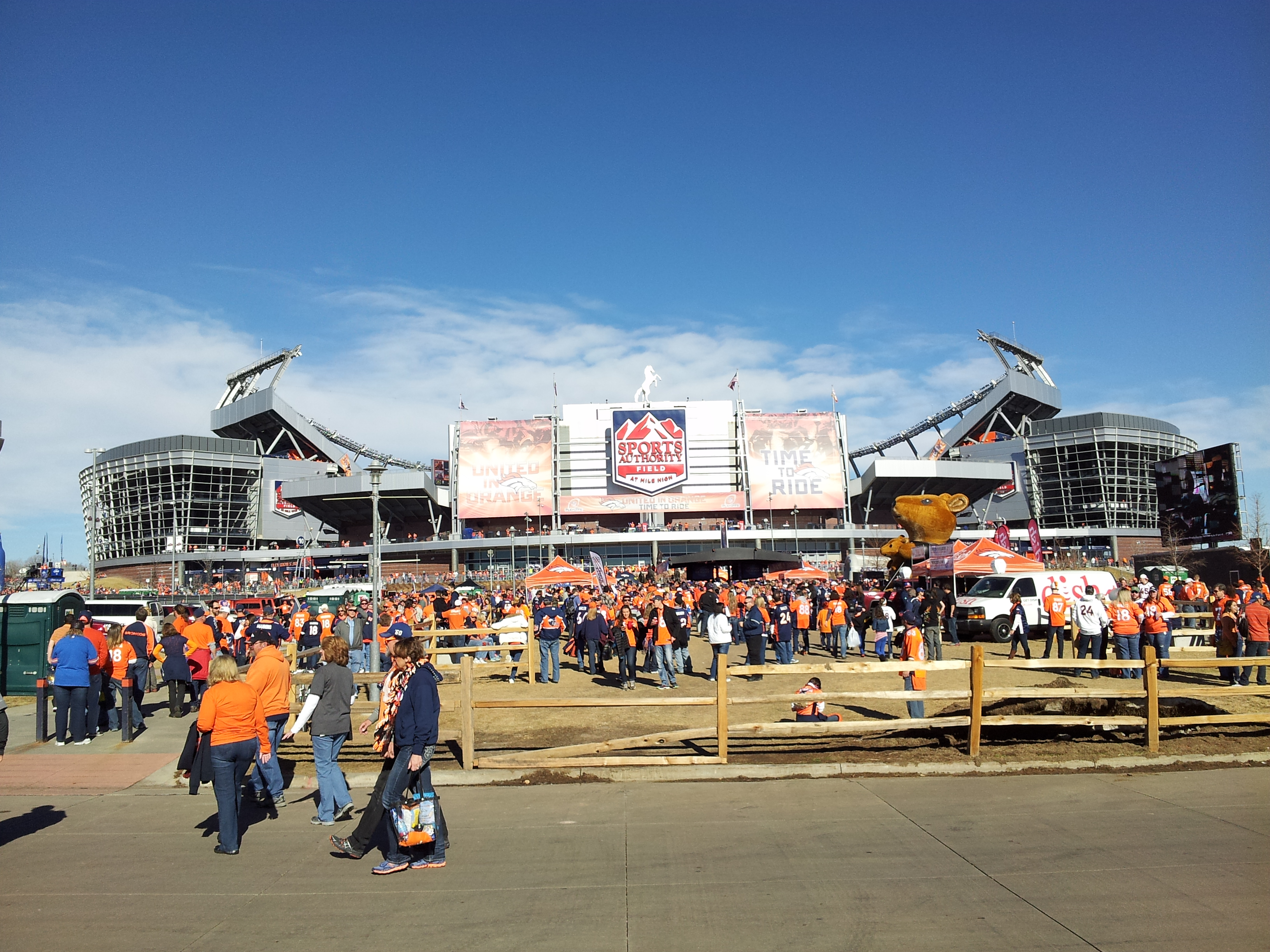
Empower Field at Mile High, where most Rocky Mountain Showdown games from 2001 to 2019 took place

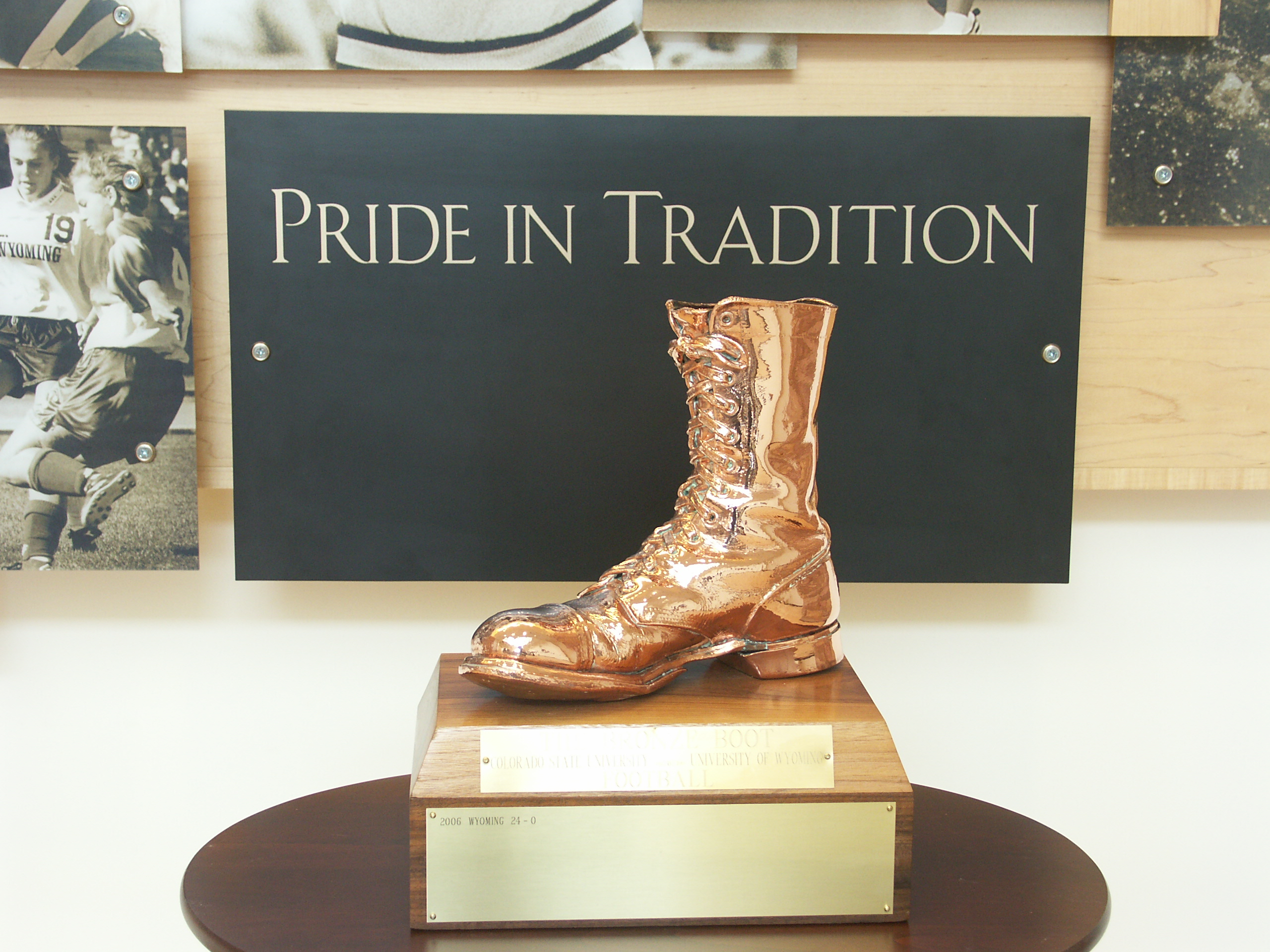
The trophy of the Border War, the Bronze Boot

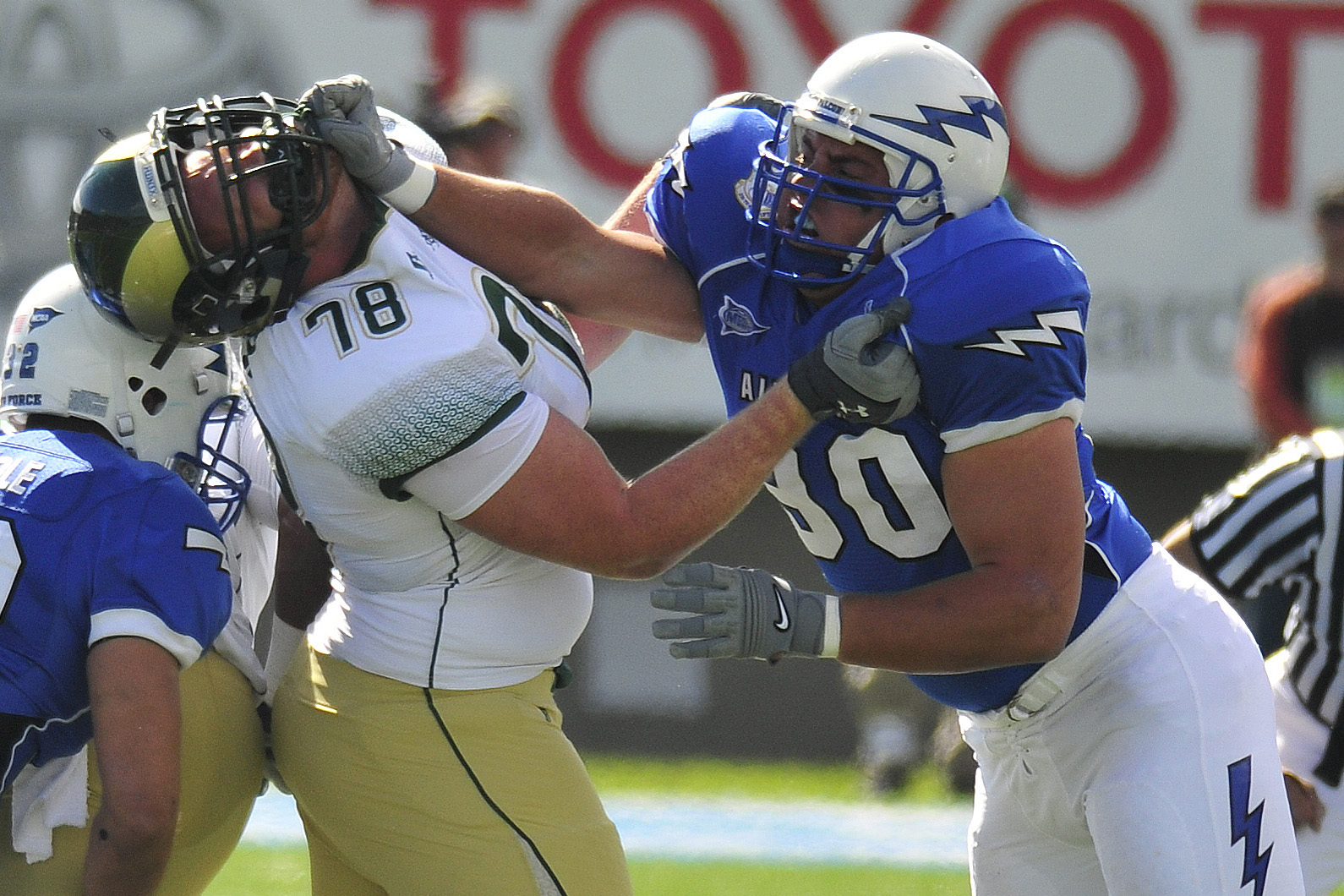
CSU battles Air Force in October 2010

=== Air Force ===
The Ram–Falcon Trophy originated in 1980 to highlight the rivalry between Colorado State and the Falcons of the U.S. Air Force Academy, another Mountain West Conference member in Colorado that is in Colorado Springs. The wood-carved trophy was produced by local artist Bill Wrage. The Air Force ROTC detachment on the CSU campus initiated the creation of the trophy. Air Force leads the series 40–22–1 through the 2025 season.

=== Colorado ===
The game between Colorado State and in-state rival Colorado, now dubbed the Rocky Mountain Showdown, began in 1893. The rivalry series was continued annually until 1958, then was resurrected in 1983. Since 1998, the game has been held mostly in Denver. Since moving to Sports Authority Field at Mile High, the teams have consistently played before the largest crowds in state history to witness a college sporting event. On August 31, 2009, Colorado State and Colorado signed a 10-year contract extension of the Rocky Mountain Showdown which brought the game back to Denver's Sports Authority Field at Mile High from 2010 to 2019. The 2020 game, scheduled to be played at Canvas Stadium, was cancelled due to the COVID-19 pandemic. After this the rivalry was once again dormant until the 2023 game at Folsom Field, and the two teams met again at Canvas Stadium in 2024. The next scheduled meeting between the two teams is in 2029, in Fort Collins. Colorado leads the series 69–22–2 through the 2024 season.

=== Wyoming ===
The rivalry between Colorado State and Wyoming, another member of the Mountain West Conference, is the longest rivalry in each school's history and also known as the "Border War" or "Battle for the Bronze Boot". The rivalry began in 1899. Since 1968, the schools have battled for possession of the Bronze Boot traveling trophy. The bronzed battle boot was worn in Vietnam by Colorado State alumnus Dan Romero. Colorado State leads the series 61–52–5 as of the 2026 season.

== Logos and uniforms ==
In July 2016 Under Armour designed new uniforms as part of its new five-year agreement to be CSU's exclusive provider of game-day uniforms, as well as footwear, apparel and training equipment for each of CSU's 16 varsity sports teams. The new deal took effect on July 1 and runs through 2020. In addition to the home and away jerseys, it will include five alternate gameday uniforms that Under Armour will supply for the Rams's football program, including the special "Orange Out" uniforms it has supplied for the annual Ag Day game.

== Notable players ==
First round draft picks

Name	Position	Year	Overall pick	Team
Gary Glick	QB	1956	1	Pittsburgh Steelers
Mark Mullaney	DE	1975	25	Minnesota Vikings
Kevin McLain	LB	1976	26	Los Angeles Rams
Mike Bell	DE	1979	2	Kansas City Chiefs
Kelly Stouffer	QB	1987	6	Seattle Seahawks

=== Active NFL ===
As of April 2026.

- Trey McBride, Arizona Cardinals
- Dom Jones, Cleveland Browns
- Trent Sieg, Dallas Cowboys
- Chigozie Anusiem, Las Vegas Raiders
- Barry Wesley, New Orleans Saints
- Tory Horton, Seattle Seahawks
- Mohamed Kamara, Tampa Bay Buccaneers
- Drew Moss, Tennessee Titans

=== Notable in other fields ===
- John Amos, running back, actor, brief professional career

== Individual awards and honors ==
=== Consensus All-Americans ===
To reach consensus All-American status, a player must be selected by at least half of the NCAA's recognized All-American teams. Colorado State has had five consensus All-Americans selections as of 2021.

- Mike Bell, 1978
- Greg Myers, 1995
- Rashard Higgins, 2014
- Michael Gallup, 2017
- Trey McBride, 2021†

†= Unanimous All-American selection.

=== Hall of Famers ===
==== College Football Hall of Fame ====
College Football Hall of Fame inductees:

- Thurman "Fum" McGraw (DL, 1946–49) McGraw was inducted into the College Football Hall of Fame in 1981.
- Greg Meyers (S, 1992–95) Myers was inducted into the College Football Hall of Fame in 2012.
- Earle Bruce (Head coach, 1989–1992)Bruce was inducted into the College Football Hall of Fame in 2002.

==== Pro Football Hall of Fame ====
Pro Football Hall of Fame inductees:

- Jack Christiansen (DB, 1948–1950) Christiansen was inducted into the Pro Football Hall of Fame in 1970.

=== Retired numbers ===
Colorado State Rams retired numbers
No.	Player	Pos.	Tenure	Year retired	Ref.
14	John Mosley ^{†}	FB/G	1939–1943	2024	
21	Eddie Hanna ^{†}	HB	1947–1949	1949	
48	Thurman McGraw	T	1946–1949		

Notes

† = Posthumous honored

Lt. Col. John Mosley was the first black football player at Colorado State (then Colorado A&M) since 1906, as well as wrestling for the school. As a football player, he lettered for three years in a row, becoming the first black letterwinner in the program's history. After graduating, Mosley enrolled in the Tuskegee Flight training center and became a bomber pilot, serving in Korea and Vietnam. In 2011, Colorado State developed the Lt. Col. John Mosley Mentoring Program as a resource for black student-athletes. Mosley died on May 22, 2015. His number was retired across all Colorado State sports on September 7, 2024.

Eddie "Twinkle Toes" Hanna was one of two black players on the 1947 Colorado A&M team (along with George Jones) at a time when many college teams were still completely white. Despite this, Hanna was widely popular in the locker room and on campus. A talented athlete, Hanna looked to be on pace to play professional football upon his graduation, but unexpectedly died from suspected cardiac arrest following the first game of the 1949 season against Colorado College in Colorado Springs, Colorado. His number was immediately retired following his death, and no player has worn it since.

Thurman "Fum" McGraw earned All-American awards in football (1948, 1949), track (discus, 1949) and wrestling (1948). He was the first consensus All-American in CSU football history and the only athlete in school history to be awarded All-American in three different sports. McGraw was drafted by the Detroit Lions in the second round of the 1950 NFL draft and was voted to the Pro Bowl his rookie year. In 1981, he was inducted into the College Football Hall of Fame and was inducted into the Colorado State University Athletics Hall of Fame in the 1988 inaugural class. McGraw died in 2000 at the age of 73. The modern-era Colorado State football program has a tradition of bringing McGraw's jersey on the road to away games.

In addition, Greg Myers' No. 3 jersey number is not retired by Colorado State, but it is displayed alongside the retired numbers under the press box in Canvas Stadium in honor of his collegiate accomplishments.

==== Colorado State University Athletics Hall of Fame ====
Since its inception in 1988, the Colorado State University Athletics Hall of Fame has honored former Ram and Aggie athletes, coaches, and administrators across all sports for their achievements and contributions to the school. The following list is of inducted athletes and coaches who have been part of the football program as of 2021.

Colorado State University Football Hall of Fame (as of 2024)
Running backs/Halfbacks/Fullbacks: Steve Bartalo 1983–86 (inducted 1995); Walter "Bus" Bergman 1939–41 (inducted 1993); Charles Bresnahan 1919–20 (inducted 1992); Alex Burl 1951–53 (inducted 2000); Ivan Dyekman 1929 (inducted 2006); Leon "Red" Eastlack 1939–41 (inducted 1993); J. Ray French 1927–28 (inducted 1990); Duane Hartshorn 1919–21 (inducted 1991); Kenny Hines 1962–64 (inducted 2024); Brady Keys 1959–60 (inducted 1996); Chet Maeda 1940–42 (inducted 1996); Lawrence McCutcheon 1969–71 (inducted 1989); Kevin McDougal 1996–99 (inducted 2012); John Mosley 1940–42 (inducted 1998); Joe Peters 1936–38 (inducted 1997); Fay Rankin 1925–27 (inducted 1992); Jim Ranson 1949 (inducted 2003); Oscar Reed 1965–67 (inducted 1993); Cecil Sapp 1999–02 (inducted 2017); Don "Lefty" Straub 1947–48 (inducted 2011); Damon Washington 1995–98 (inducted 2012); Ends/Tight ends: Dan Beattie 1927–29 (inducted 2010); Norm Cable 1935–37 (inducted 1989); Chester Cruikshank 1932–34 (inducted 1995); Kay Dalton 1951–53 (inducted 2000); Rick Dennison 1976–79 (inducted 1996); Joel Dreessen 2000–04 (inducted 2021); George Jones 1946–49 (inducted 2002); Keli McGregor 1981–84 (inducted 1997); Glenn Morris 1931–33 (inducted 1988); Jack Upton 1977–78 (inducted 2007)	Quarterbacks: Don Burroughs 1951–52 (inducted 1990); Fred Glick 1956–58 (inducted 1991); Garrett Grayson 2011–14 (inducted 2024); Anthoney Hill 1991–94 (inducted 2008); Kenny Hyde 1923–25 (inducted 1993); Moses Moreno 1994–97 (inducted 2009); Bradlee Van Pelt 2001–03 (inducted 2013); Wide receivers: David Anderson 2002–05 (inducted 2017); Rashard Higgins 2013–15 (inducted 2024); Kay McFarland 1961 (inducted 1992); Willie Miller 1972–74 (inducted 1994); Greg Primus 1989–92 (inducted 2003); Offensive linemen: Harvey Achziger 1950–52 (inducted 2012); Kevin Call 1980–83 (inducted 1999); Anthony Cesario 1995–98 (inducted 2007); Steve Cyphers 1973–77 (inducted 1998); Willis "Tuffy" Holland 1953–55 (inducted 2013); Lavern (Nick) Kohls 1959–61 (inducted 2005); Mark Mullaney 1971–74 (inducted 2006); Don "Tuffy" Mullison 1942, 1947–48 (inducted 1990); Mike Newell 1995–98 (inducted 2015); Erik Pears 2001–04 (inducted 2023); Weston Richburg 2010–13 (inducted 2023); Carlyle Vickers 1926–28 (inducted 1991); Bob Weber 1951–52, 1955–56 (inducted 2001); Defensive linemen: Al "Bubba" Baker 1974–77 (inducted 1991); Mike Bell 1975–78 (inducted 2001); Dale Dodrill 1947–50 (inducted 1988); Clark Haggans 1996–99 (inducted 2015); Thurman "Fum" McGraw 1946–49 (inducted 1988); Sean Moran 1992–95 (inducted 2004); Fred Paoli 1972–75 (inducted 1998); Brady Smith 1992–95 (inducted 2005)	Linebackers: Adrian Ross 1994–97 (inducted 2023); Joey Porter 1995–98 (inducted 2013); Kevin Sheesley 1978–81 (inducted 2009); Defensive backs: Jack Christiansen 1948–50 (inducted 1988); Jim David 1949–51 (inducted 1989); Gary Glick 1953–55 (inducted 1988); Richie Hall 1980–82 (inducted 1999); Ray Jackson 1992–95 (inducted 2011); Linden King 1974–76 (inducted 1998); Greg Meyers 1992–95 (inducted 2001); Earlie Thomas 1967–69 (inducted 1994); Ollie Woods 1946–48 (inducted 2008); Dexter Wynn 2000–03 (inducted 2019); Coaches: Bob Davis 1947–55 (inducted 1988); Harry W. Hughes 1911–1941, 1946 (inducted 1988); Sonny Lubick 1993–07 (inducted 1998); Julius "Hans" Wagner 1927–42, 1945–46 (inducted 1988); Teams: 1994 football team 1994 (inducted 2019); 1997 football team 1997 (inducted 2017)

Italicized years indicate the individual's collegiate football career at Colorado State.

== Future non-conference opponents ==
Future non-conference opponents announced as of November 10, 2026.

2027	2028	2029	2030	2031	2032	2033	2034	2035	2037	2038
at UNLV	UNLV	Northern Colorado	Wyoming	at Wyoming	Northern Colorado	Northern Colorado	Colorado	Northern Colorado	at Colorado	Colorado
Arizona	at Arizona	at BYU	at Colorado		Wyoming	at Colorado	Wyoming	at Wyoming		
Akron	Wyoming	Colorado				at Wyoming				
Houston Baptist		at Wyoming								
