= Greg Myers (American football) =

American football player (born 1972)

No. 31, 29
- Position: Safety

Personal information
- Born: September 30, 1972 (age 54); Tampa, Florida, U.S.
- Listed height: 6 ft 1 in (1.85 m)
- Listed weight: 202 lb (92 kg)

Career information
- High school: Windsor (CO)
- College: Colorado State
- NFL draft: 1996: 5th round, 144th overall pick

Career history
- Cincinnati Bengals (1996–1999); Dallas Cowboys (2000)

Awards and highlights
- Jim Thorpe Award (1995); Consensus All-American (1995); 2× First-team All-American (1994); 4× All-WAC (1992–1995); Colorado Sports Hall of Fame

Career NFL statistics
- Tackles: 228
- Interceptions: 4
- Fumble recoveries: 4
- Stats at Pro Football Reference
- College Football Hall of Fame

Gregory Jay Myers (born September 30, 1972) is an American former professional football player who was a safety in the National Football League (NFL) for the Cincinnati Bengals and Dallas Cowboys. He played college football at Colorado State University, where he was recognized as a consensus All-American, and won the Jim Thorpe Award.

== Early life ==
Myers was born in Tampa, Florida. He attended Windsor High School in Windsor, Colorado. As a freshman, he was a placekicker, helping the team win a conference championship game against Brush High School. He would later play quarterback, running back, defensive back and kick returner. His No. 3 jersey number is retired by Windsor High School.

In track, he was the Colorado high school champion in the pole vault (twice), 100 metres (twice), and the 200 metres.

In 2012, he was a member of the inaugural Windsor High School (Colo.) Athletic Hall of Fame. In 1999, he was voted by the Greeley Tribune as the No. 3 Weld County athlete of the century.

== College career ==
Myers accepted a football scholarship from Colorado State University, where he played under head coach Earle Bruce and Sonny Lubick's Colorado State Rams football teams from 1992 to 1995. He became a starter at free safety as a freshman.

As a junior in 1994, he received first-team All-American honors from the Football Writers Association of America, Scripps-Howard, and The Sporting News. As a senior in 1995, he won the Jim Thorpe Award as the best defensive back in the nation, and was recognized as a consensus first-team All-American after receiving first-team selections from the Associated Press, United Press International, the Walter Camp Foundation, and The Sporting News.

During Myers' four years as a Ram, the team improved significantly, compiling a 10–2 record, winning an outright WAC championship in 1994, an 8–4 record and a share of the WAC title in 1995. He was a first-team All-WAC selection for four consecutive seasons (1992–1995) and received seven All-conference selections (4 in defense and 3 as a return specialist);the only player in the history of the WAC to achieve that distinction. He finished with 1,332 career punt return yards (conference record), a 15.9-yard punt return average (school record), 3 punts returned for touchdowns (school record), 295 tackles and 15 interceptions.

In addition to his athletic prowess, Myers was a standout in the college classroom. He earned Academic All-America honors in 1994 and 1995, and received the WAC's Stan Bates Award as the conference's best overall student athlete in 1996. He was the recipient of an NCAA Post-Graduate Scholarship.

In 2001, Myers was inducted into the Colorado State University Sports Hall of Fame. In 2012, he was inducted into the College Football Hall of Fame and the Colorado Sports Hall of Fame. While his No. 3 jersey number is not retired by Colorado State, it is displayed alongside the retired numbers under the press box in Canvas Stadium in honor of his collegiate accomplishments.

== Professional career ==
Pre-draft measurables
Height	Weight	Arm length	Hand span	Bench press
6 ft 1 in (1.85 m)	197 lb (89 kg)	31 in (0.79 m)	9 1/4 in (0.23 m)	14 reps

=== Cincinnati Bengals ===
Myers was selected by the Cincinnati Bengals in the fifth round (144th pick overall) of the 1996 NFL draft. The next year, he became the regular starter at free safety over Bo Orlando, finishing second on the team with 82 tackles.

In 1999, he started 16 games. In 1999, he started the first 4 games, before being passed on the depth chart by rookie Cory Hall. He posted 37 tackles, one interception, 5 passes defensed, one fumble recovery and one forced fumble.

In 2000, he tore his left patella tendon in the first preseason game against the Buffalo Bills and was released with an injury settlement on August 18.

=== Dallas Cowboys ===
On November 8, 2000, he signed as a free agent with the Dallas Cowboys. He started 4 games at free safety, replacing Darren Woodson who broke his right forearm. He tore his left medial cruciate ligament in the fifteenth game against the New York Giants. He recorded 21 tackles, one quarterback pressure, 2 special teams tackles and wasn't re-signed after the season. He finished with 64 regular season games appearances, starting 38, while compiling 221 tackles, 4 interceptions and 4 forced fumbles.

== Personal life ==
Myers is currently an anesthesiologist in the level one trauma unit at Denver Health Medical Center in Denver, Colorado. He is also an assistant professor through the University of Colorado residency program. Myers is divorced and he has a son and a daughter.
