= Dave Baldwin (American football) =

American football coach

Biographical details
- Born: March 22, 1955 (age 71); Denver, Colorado, U.S.
- Education: California State University, Northridge; Saint Mary's College of California

Coaching career (HC unless noted)
- 1978: Cal State Northridge (WR/TE)
- 1979: Cal State Northridge (DB)
- 1980-1983: San Jose State (WR)
- 1984-1987: Stanford (WR)
- 1988: Stanford (PGC)
- 1990–1993: Santa Barbara
- 1994: Santa Rosa
- 1995–1996: Cal State Northridge
- 1997–2000: San Jose State
- 2001: Cincinnati (OC)
- 2002: Baylor (OC/QB)
- 2003–2006: Michigan State (OC/TE)
- 2007–2008: New Mexico (OC/QB)
- 2009: Utah State (OC/WR)
- 2010: Utah State (OC/QB)
- 2011: Utah State (OC/TE)
- 2012: Colorado State (OC/TE)
- 2013–2014: Colorado State (OC/QB, interim HC)
- 2015: Oregon State (OC/TE)
- 2016: Oregon State (WR)
- 2017: Oregon State (TE)
- 2020–2021: Northern Colorado (OC/QB)

Head coaching record
- Overall: 27–40 (college); 31–21 (junior college)
- Bowls: 0–1 (NCAA FBS); 0–2 (junior college)

Charles David Baldwin (born March 22, 1955) is an American football coach. He served as the head football coach at California State University, Northridge from 1995 to 1996 and at San Jose State University from 1997 to 2000. Baldwin was also the interim head football coach at Colorado State University for 2014 Las Vegas Bowl.

== Coaching career ==
Baldwin has served as a graduate assistant coach at Cal State Northridge, the offensive coordinator at Cincinnati, and the offensive coordinator at Baylor. Following San Jose State, he served as the offensive coordinator at Michigan State, New Mexico and Utah State.

Baldwin was the head football coach at Cal State Northridge from 1995 to 1996, compiling a record of 9–12. He was also the head football coach at San Jose State.

During his tenure as head coach at San Jose State from 1997 to 2000, he had three straight wins over Stanford (including in their Rose Bowl season of 1999). In 1997, SJSU upset No. 24 Air Force, (25–22) their first win over a ranked opponent since 1990. In 2000, SJSU beat ninth-ranked TCU (27–24) ending their 12-game winning streak. Also in 2000, SJSU earned a mark of 7–5, their first winning season in eight years. His overall record at San Jose State University was 18–27.

Baldwin served as the offensive coordinator for the Colorado State Rams of Colorado State University from 2012 until 2014. He also was the interim head coach for the Rams during the 2014 Las Vegas Bowl, following Jim McElwain's departure for the University of Florida. On December 20, 2014, following the Bowl Game, Baldwin along with the entire coaching staff received their termination papers.

In 2015, Baldwin joined Oregon State as offensive coordinator and tight ends coach under Gary Andersen. The following season, Baldwin left his duties as offensive coordinator and became the inside receivers coach. He later became tight ends coach in 2017. Baldwin and other assistant coaches were fired on November 26, 2017 as Oregon State continued its coaching search, over a month after Andersen resigned and Cory Hall took over as interim head coach.

== Personal ==
Baldwin is married and has three children.

In 2015, Baldwin disclosed he has been drinking 16 to 18 cans of Diet Coke a day for over 15 years.

== Head coaching record ==
=== Junior college ===
Year	Team	Overall	Conference	Standing	Bowl/playoffs
Santa Barbara City Vaqueros (Western State Conference) (1990–1993)
1990	Santa Barbara City	4–6	3–6 (North)	5th	
1991	Santa Barbara City	9–2	8–1	1st (North)	L Potato
1992	Santa Barbara City	5–5	4–5	3rd (North)	
1993	Santa Barbara City	5–5	5–4	3rd (North)	
Santa Barbara City:		23–18	20–16		
Santa Rosa Bear Cubs (Bay Valley Conference) (1994)
1994	Santa Rosa	8–3			L Lions Bowl
Santa Rosa:		8–3			
Total:		31–21			

=== College ===
Year	Team	Overall	Conference	Standing	Bowl/playoffs
Cal State Northridge Matadors (American West Conference) (1995)
1995	Cal State Northridge	2–8	1–2	3rd	
Cal State Northridge Matadors (Big Sky Conference) (1996)
1996	Cal State Northridge	7–4	5–3	T–3rd	
Cal State Northridge:		9–12	6–5		
San Jose State Spartans (Western Athletic Conference) (1997–2000)
1997	San Jose State	4–7	4–4	T–4th (Pacific)	
1998	San Jose State	4–8	3–5	T–5th (Pacific)	
1999	San Jose State	3–7	1–5	7th	
2000	San Jose State	7–5	5–3	4th	
San Jose State:		18–27	13–17		
Colorado State Rams (Mountain West Conference) (2014)
2014	Colorado State	0–1			L Las Vegas
Colorado State:		0–1		* Interim HC for bowl game	
Total:		27–40			
