= 1899 Colorado Agricultural Aggies football team =

American college football season

1899 Colorado Agricultural Aggies football
- Conference: Colorado Football Association
- Record: 0–2–1 (0–2 CFA)
- Head coach: W. J. Forbes (1st season)
- Home stadium: Durkee Field

1899 Colorado Football Association standings
	Conf.					Overall
Team	W		L		T	W		L		T
Colorado College $	2	–	0	–	0	3	–	2	–	1
Colorado	2	–	1	–	0	7	–	2	–	0
Colorado Mines	1	–	2	–	0	2	–	3	–	0
Colorado Agricultural	0	–	2	–	0	0	–	2	–	1
$ – Conference champion

The 1899 Colorado Agricultural Aggies football team represented Colorado Agricultural College (now known as Colorado State University) in the Colorado Football Association (CFA) during the 1899 college football season. In their first and only season under head coach W. J. Forbes, the Aggies compiled a 0–2–1 record and were outscored by a total of 117 to 10.

W. J. Forbes was the program's first football coach. He was paid $25 for his services during the 1899 season. Forbes died in a freak accident following the season, on June 18, 1900, at 25 years old.

In the first game that Colorado Agricultural ever played outside of the state of Colorado (and their first ever game against Wyoming), a disagreement between officials from the two schools resulted in a controversial ending to the game, sparking a rivalry that has lasted to this day.

At the time, officials were provided by the schools competing in the game. The game concluded with a Wyoming forfeit being called after Colorado Agricultural official Edward House ruled that Wyoming official E.D. McArthur and the Wyoming team were refusing to abide by the rulebook. After the forfeit was called and the Colorado Agricultural players began leaving the field, official McArthur reportedly exclaimed that he "did not give a damn for the rules" and instructed the Wyoming team to run in a touchdown. This action reportedly set off a brawl between the teams.

Following the game, Colorado Agricultural President Barton Aylesworth declared that his school would not play Wyoming in any athletic event until he received a written apology from the school. The two schools played again the following year, and there has remained bad blood between the two programs since. Per an NCAA rule that does not recognize forfeits in games that were incomplete, Colorado State University does not count the game as a victory in their record books.

== Schedule ==
Date	Opponent	Site	Result	Source
October 15	at Colorado	Campus Field; Boulder, CO (rivalry)	L 0–63	
	Colorado Mines	Durkee Field; Fort Collins, CO	L 5–49	
	Colorado State Normal	Durkee Field; Fort Collins, CO	T 5–5	
November 30	at Wyoming	Prexy's Pasture; Laramie, WY (rivalry)	N/A (forfeit)	
