= Wyett Ekeler =

American football player (born 2001)

Profile
- Position: Safety

Personal information
- Born: March 15, 2001 (age 25); Windsor, Colorado, U.S.
- Listed height: 5 ft 11 in (1.80 m)
- Listed weight: 210 lb (95 kg)

Career information
- High school: Windsor
- College: Wyoming (2020–2024)
- NFL draft: 2025: undrafted

Career history
- Indianapolis Colts (2025)*
- * Offseason or practice squad member only

Wyett Ekeler (born March 15, 2001) is an American professional football safety. He played college football for the Wyoming Cowboys.

== Early life ==
Ekeler attended Windsor High School in Windsor, Colorado. As a senior, he was named the 4A Northern Colorado Offensive Player of the Year after rushing for 1,435 yards and 22 touchdowns. Coming out of high school, Ekeler committed to play college football for the Wyoming Cowboys.

== College career ==
In his first two seasons in 2020 and 2021, Ekeler combined to make just seven tackles combined. In 2022, he earned a starting spot in the Cowboys secondary where he notched 67 tackles. In week 5 of the 2023 season, Ekeler notched two tackles for loss, two sacks, a forced fumble, and a fumble recovery in a win over New Mexico, where he was named the Mountain West Conference Defensive Player of the Week. In week 14, he returned an interception 38 yards for a touchdown in a blowout win against Nevada Wolf Pack and was once again named the Mountain West Defensive Player of the Week. Ekeler finished the 2023 season with 77 tackles, two sacks, seven pass deflections, two interceptions, two forced fumbles, and a fumble recovery. In his final collegiate season in 2024, he recorded 46 tackles; after the season, he declared for the 2025 NFL draft.

== Professional career ==
On December 30, 2025, Ekeler was signed to the Indianapolis Colts' practice squad. He signed a reserve/future contract with Indianapolis on January 5, 2026. He was waived on June 1, 2026.

== Personal life ==
He is the brother of NFL running back Austin Ekeler.
