= W. J. Forbes =

American football and baseball coach (1874–1900)

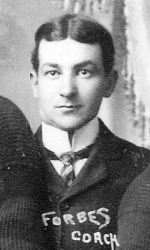
- Forbes pictured in 1899 as head coach at Colorado Agricultural

Biographical details
- Born: August 24, 1874; Shoreham, Vermont, U.S.
- Died: June 18, 1900 (aged 25); Loveland, Colorado, U.S.

Playing career

Football
- 1896–1898: Vermont

Coaching career (HC unless noted)

Football
- 1899: Colorado Agricultural

Baseball
- 1898: Vermont

Head coaching record
- Overall: 0–2–1 (football); 9–7 (baseball)

William James Forbes (August 24, 1874 – June 18, 1900) was an American college football and college baseball coach. He served as the first ever head football coach at Colorado Agricultural College — now known as Colorado State University — in 1899, compiling a record of 0–2–1. Forbes was also the head baseball coach at the University of Vermont for one season in 1898, tallying a mark of 9–7. He was a native of Shoreham, Vermont.

During Forbes' single season at the school, he led the Colorado Agricultural team in an infamous Thanksgiving Day game against Wyoming that began the Border War rivalry series.

Forbes was killed in an accident on June 18, 1900, in Loveland, Colorado after just one season as head coach at Colorado Agricultural. He was reportedly with a friend in Longmont attending a fire hose team (a group of men who pulled the hose cart to a fire for the local fire department) training drill as a spectator when the team announced they were short by one man. Forbes volunteered to stand in for the missing man despite not having proper running attire. On the team's third lap with the cart, Forbes slipped and fell and one of the cart's large wheels struck him in his back, severely injuring him. He died 30 minutes after the accident in a nearby hospital.

== Head coaching record ==
=== Football ===
Year	Team	Overall	Conference	Standing
Colorado Agricultural Aggies (Colorado Football Association) (1899)
1899	Colorado Agricultural	0–2–1	0–2	4th
Colorado Agricultural:		0–2–1	0–2	
Total:		0–2–1		
