= 2014 Las Vegas Bowl =

2014 Royal Purple Las Vegas Bowl
- 23rd Las Vegas Bowl
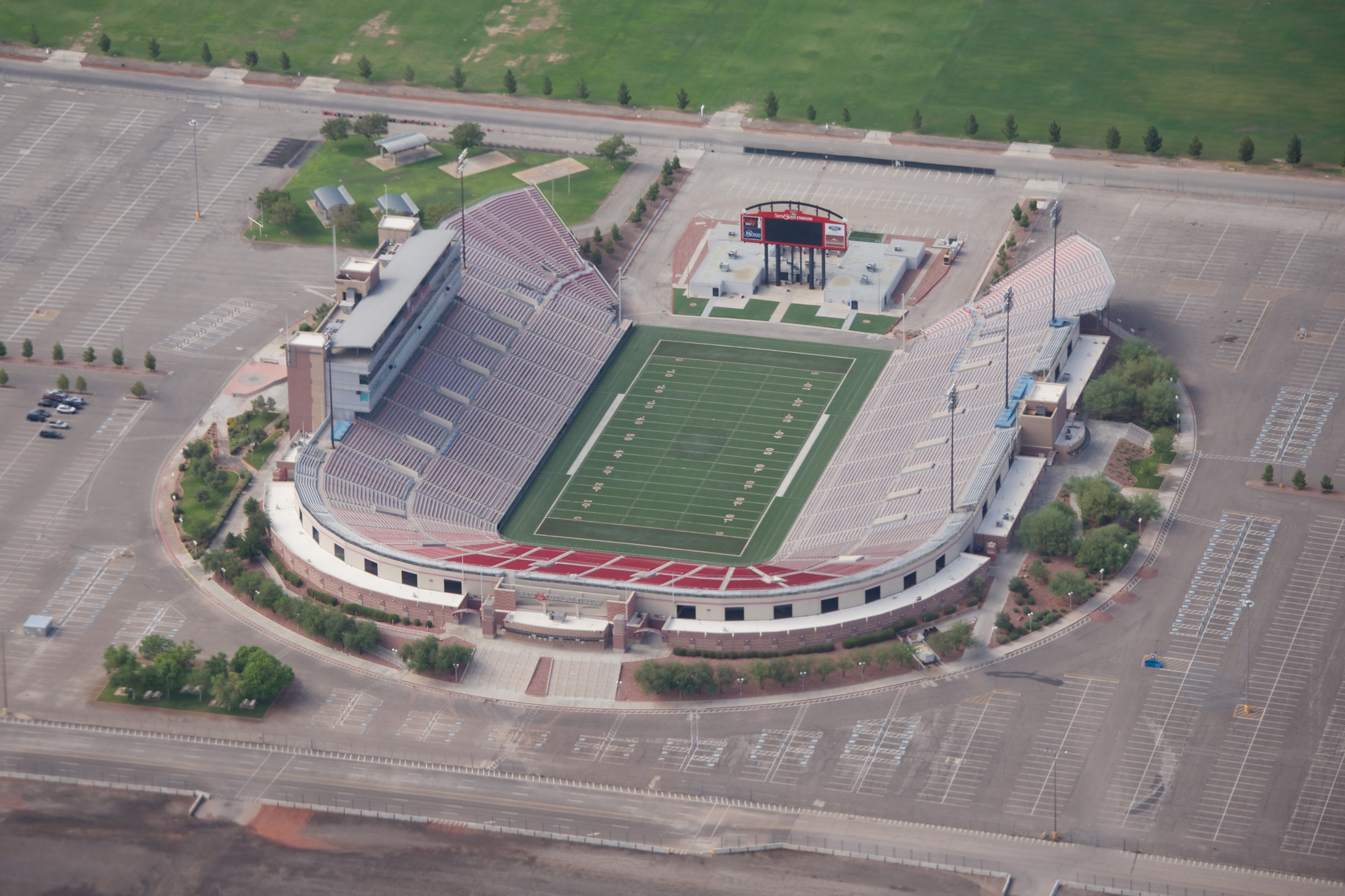
- Sam Boyd Stadium in Whitney, Nevada, hosted the Las Vegas Bowl.
| Utah Utes | Colorado State Rams |
| (8–4) | (10–2) |
| Pac-12 | Mountain West |
| 45 | 10 |
| Head coach: Kyle Whittingham | Head coach: Dave Baldwin (Interim) |
| AP / Coaches / CFP; 23 / 25 / 22 |
| | 1 | 2 | 3 | 4 | Total |
|---|---|---|---|---|---|
| Utah | 21 | 3 | 7 | 14 | 45 |
| Colorado State | 10 | 0 | 0 | 0 | 10 |
- Date: December 20, 2014
- Season: 2014
- Stadium: Sam Boyd Stadium
- Location: Whitney, Nevada
- MVP: Utah QB Travis Wilson
- Favorite: Utah by 3
- Referee: Tracy Jones (American)
- Attendance: 33,067
- Payout: US$1 million per team

United States TV coverage
- Network: ABC/Sports USA
- Announcers: Brent Musburger, Jesse Palmer, & Maria Taylor (ABC); Eli Gold & Tony Graziani (Sports USA)

The 2014 Las Vegas Bowl was an American college football bowl game that was played on December 20, 2014, at Sam Boyd Stadium in Whitney, Nevada, in the Las Vegas Valley. The 23rd annual Las Vegas Bowl, it featured the Utah Utes from the Pac-12 Conference against the Colorado State Rams of the Mountain West Conference. It was one of the 2014–15 bowl games that concluded the 2014 FBS football season. The game started at 12:30 p.m. PST and aired on ABC and Sports USA Radio Network. Sponsored by motor oil manufacturer Royal Purple, the game was officially known as the Royal Purple Las Vegas Bowl. Utah beat Colorado State by a score of 45–10.

== Teams ==
This was the 80th overall meeting between these two teams, with Utah leading the series 55–22–2. The last time these two teams met was in 2010.

== Game summary ==
=== Scoring summary ===
Scoring summary

| Quarter | Time | Drive | | | Team | Scoring information | Score | |
| Quarter | Time | Plays | Yards | TOP | Team | Scoring information | Utah | CSU |
|---|---|---|---|---|---|---|---|---|
| 1 | 12:37 | 3 | 53 | 0:56 | Utah | Travis Wilson 8-yard touchdown run, Andy Phillips kick good | 7 | 0 |
| 1 | 8:29 | 6 | 71 | 2:55 | Utah | Delshawn McClellon 16-yard touchdown reception from Travis Wilson, Andy Phillips kick good | 14 | 0 |
| 1 | 5:42 | 5 | 77 | 2:41 | CSU | Garrett Grayson 39-yard touchdown reception from Charles Lovett, Jared Roberts kick good | 14 | 7 |
| 1 | 5:30 | 1 | 60 | 0:10 | Utah | Devontae Booker 60-yard touchdown run, Andy Phillips kick good | 21 | 7 |
| 1 | 2:09 | 6 | 54 | 3:14 | CSU | 41-yard field goal by Jared Roberts | 21 | 10 |
| 2 | 8:25 | 8 | 37 | 4:18 | Utah | 38-yard field goal by Andy Phillips | 24 | 10 |
| 3 | 4:12 | 10 | 73 | 3:46 | Utah | Travis Wilson 15-yard touchdown run, Andy Phillips kick good | 31 | 10 |
| 4 | 13:23 | 1 | 12 | 0:06 | Utah | Travis Wilson 12-yard touchdown run, Andy Phillips kick good | 38 | 10 |
| 4 | 12:28 | 2 | 29 | 0:34 | Utah | Bubba Poole 10-yard touchdown run, Andy Phillips kick good | 45 | 10 |
| "TOP" = time of possession. For other American football terms, see Glossary of American football. | | | | | | | 45 | 10 |

=== Statistics ===
| Statistics | Utah | CSU |
|---|---|---|
| First downs | 29 | 13 |
| Plays–yards | 77–548 | 54–278 |
| Rushes–yards | 48–359 | 19–12 |
| Passing yards | 189 | 266 |
| Passing: Comp–Att–Int | 19–29–1 | 21–35–1 |
| Time of possession | 33:56 | 26:04 |
