= Colorado State University Fight Song =

Official fight song for Colorado State University

The Colorado State University Fight Song, known as "Stalwart Rams", is the official fight song for Colorado State University. Features of its uniqueness include the use of the word "stalwart", meaning unrelenting and full of ardor, and the third line of the song which allows the fight song to be adapted for each game, from "tear the Buffaloes' line asunder" to "tear the Cowboys' line asunder."

The CSU Fight Song is commonly followed immediately by the "Spell Yell", a song in which the band and fans spell the word "Rams".

== History ==
The "Colorado State University Fight Song" was written by Richard F. Bourne, then the director of the marching band and a veterinary medicine professor at Colorado Agricultural College in Fort Collins. The song's lyrics were first published in the Rocky Mountain Collegian on November 16, 1932 and debuted at the football game against Utah three days later. The original lyrics were slightly different than the current ones, including the line "fight on ye stalwart aggies" as the Colorado State Rams were referred to as the Aggies during this time. Several other fight songs were used throughout the years, the original fight song "Come on Aggies" used the melody of "On, Wisconsin!" and was used from the 1910s to the 1950s. Another such song is the "Aggie Boom Song" which was adopted in 1937 as the official song of the Colorado A&M Aggies. The lyrics of the fight song were modified to include the newly adopted "Rams" name when Colorado A&M changed its name to Colorado State University in 1957.

== Lyrics ==
Fight on, you stalwart RAM team,
On to the goal!
Tear the [opponent]'s line asunder,
As down the field we thunder!
Knights of the Green and Gold,
Fight on with all your might!
Fight on you stalwart ram team,
FIGHT! FIGHT! FIGHT!
GO RAMS!
