= CAM the Ram =

University mascot

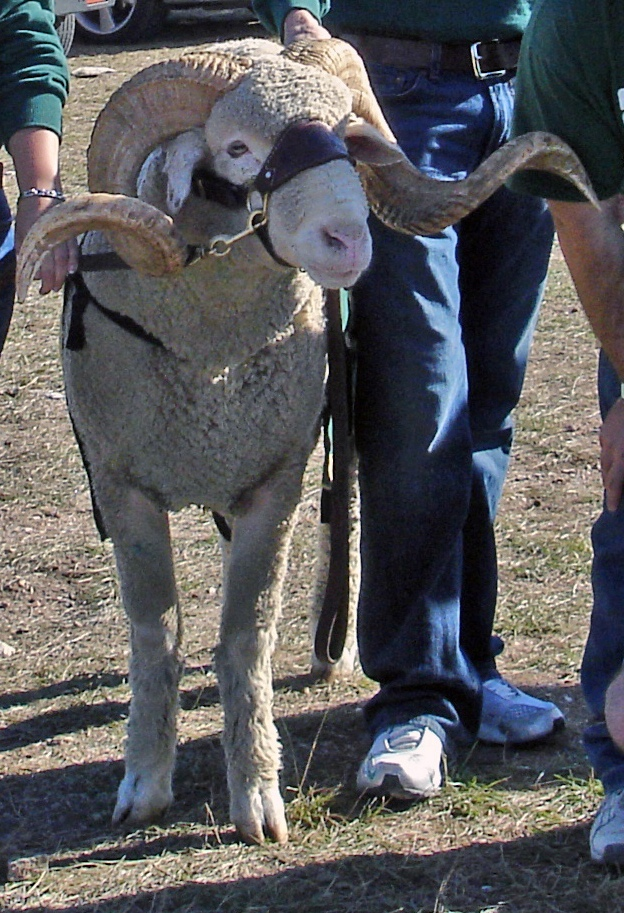
- University: Colorado State University
- Conference: Pac-12
- Origin of name: contest
- First seen: 1947

CAM the Ram is the mascot of Colorado State University. There is the live mascot whose origins date back to a competition held in 1946 to name the new face of the university. The winner was an alumnus who created the acronym CAM from the schools name at the time, Colorado Agricultural and Mechanical College. CAM's most notable appearance is during home football games. CAM runs across the endzone during home football games after a touchdown. Then there is the costumed mascot also named CAM the Ram. The costumed CAM was revamped in 2010, and appears at the majority of sporting events.

== Live mascot ==
CAM has been played by a total of 26 different Rambouillet sheep over the years since the mascot's first appearance in 1947. CAM 22 made over 250 appearances and was retired in 2010 at the age of seven when CAM 23 took his place. CAM 24 died on September 19, 2015, the day of the 2015 Rocky Mountain Showdown leaving CAM 25 to take his place. CAM 25 is CAM 24's half-brother and was 6 months old at the time. CAM 25 was retired due to age in 2020, and the current CAM (CAM 26) is now the active mascot.

Cam has been a steady spirit booster ever since he arrived on campus. He makes trips around the state in a temperature-controlled 35 foot trailer. The Alumni Association supports CAM and manages the Ram Handlers program. Cam lives at an off campus livestock boarding facility with other farm animals and even his successor.

=== Ram handlers ===
Cam is taken care of by nineteen handlers who participate in CAM's training and care, transportation to events, sharing CAM's story with Rams fans of all ages, and traditions such as his sprint across the end zone during home football games. The Alumni Association encourages students from any and all majors and backgrounds to apply to join the group. A Ram Handlers Mission is to actively promote CSU through working with CAM the Ram and will engage with University constituents, model the Principles of Community, and uphold the tradition of CAM the Ram.

== Costumed mascot ==
There is also a costumed, two legged CAM the Ram whose first appearances date back to the early 1980s. The newest version was unveiled in October 2010. During this 2010 revamp, he lost his cartoonish characteristics and began to look like a real ram. He now wears No. 70 on his jerseys, to signify the year that the university was established, 1870. CAM can be seen on all types of Colorado State University merchandise and can even be seen as a stuffed animal in the stores on campus. The costume CAM can be seen at majority of home sporting events as well as out in the community.
