= Colorado State Rams =

Intercollegiate sports teams of Colorado State University

- University: Colorado State University
- Nickname: Rams
- NCAA: Division I (FBS)
- Conference: Pac-12 (primary); MPSF (indoor track and field)
- Athletic director: John Weber
- Location: Fort Collins, Colorado
- Varsity teams: 15
- Football stadium: Sonny Lubick Field at Canvas Stadium (2017–present)
- Basketball arena: Moby Arena (1966-present)
- Colors: Green and gold
- Mascot: CAM the Ram
- Fight song: Colorado State University Fight Song
- Website: csurams.com

The Colorado State Rams are the athletic teams that represent Colorado State University (CSU). Colorado State's athletic teams compete along with eight other institutions in the Pac-12 Conference (Pac-12), which is an NCAA Division I conference and sponsors Division I FBS football. They previously were members of the Mountain West Conference from when it was formed in 1999, splitting from the former 16-member Western Athletic Conference. CSU has won nine MWC tournament championships and won or shared 11 regular season titles. Rams football teams won or shared the Mountain West title in 1999, 2000 and 2002.

Hughes Stadium (capacity: 34,000) was home to Rams football from 1968 through 2016. The field at Hughes Stadium, named "Sonny Lubick Field" after the Rams' then-football coach, underwent a $15.2 million renovation for the fall 2005 season. Hughes Stadium was replaced for the 2017 season by the new Colorado State Stadium (capacity 41,000), whose playing field also bears Lubick's name; the stadium's name was changed to Canvas Stadium in 2018. Moby Arena (capacity: 9,000) originally constructed in 1966 and remodeled in 1996, is home to the men's and women's basketball teams, as well as the CSU Rams volleyball team.

The official school colors are green and gold. The CSU fight song and Fum's song are two popular school songs.

Colorado State has three major rivalries. Outside of the conference, the Rams play in-state rival Colorado in the Rocky Mountain Showdown, which was hosted at Empower Field at Mile High through 2019 before the series returned to on-campus stadiums. During their time in the Mountain West, Colorado State had a big rivalry with Air Force. The winner of the CSU-Air Force football game received the Ram-Falcon Trophy. Colorado State also had a conference rivalry with Wyoming (the Border War), with the winner of the annual football game receiving the Bronze Boot. Played since 1899, the CSU-Wyoming rivalry is the second oldest interstate rivalry west of the Mississippi, behind only the "Border Showdown" (formerly "Border War") of Missouri and Kansas and just ahead of the "Red River Rivalry" (formerly "Red River Shootout") of Texas and Oklahoma played since 1900.

== History ==
Before 1957, Colorado State University was referred to as Colorado Agriculture and Mechanical College or "Colorado A&M", and athletic teams were referred to as "Aggies". In 1924, an "A" was whitewashed onto the western hillside of Fort Collins in support of the Aggies. The hillside where the "A" is painted is directly adjacent to Hughes Stadium and below Horsetooth Rock.

== Sports sponsored ==
Men's sports	Women's sports
Basketball	Basketball
Cross country	Cross country
Football	Golf
Golf	Soccer
Track and field^{†}	Softball
	Swimming and diving
	Tennis
	Track and field^{†}
	Volleyball
† – Track and field includes both indoor and outdoor

=== Football ===
Colorado State football goes back 115 seasons, and experienced its most successful run under head coach Sonny Lubick. Since Sonny Lubick took control over the Rams as head coach in 1992, the Rams have made nine bowl appearances. CSU had only two previous bowl appearances. Lubick won nearly 75% of home games in the stadium that would later bear his name, leading the team to six conference titles and an overall record of 108–74. CSU was consistently a top 25 contender from 1994 to 2002, with a 79–32 record during that period and 3 top 25 finishes. Lubick, conference coach of the year four times, coached former Denver Broncos Cecil Sapp and Erik Pears, and all-pro NFL linebacker Joey Porter.

On November 27, 2007, following significant drops in attendance and a 17–30 record over the past 4 seasons, including 3–9 in 2007, CSU made the difficult and controversial decision to relieve Lubick of his head coaching duties. The school hired Buffalo Bills offensive coordinator Steve Fairchild to take the helm. Fairchild was a Rams quarterback from 1978 to 1980, and served under Lubick as quarterback's coach and later as offensive coordinator from 1993 to 2000. After going 7–6 in his first season and leading CSU to a win in the New Mexico Bowl over Fresno State in 2008, Fairchild's Rams fell back to mediocrity. The Rams would finish each of the next three seasons 3–9. On December 4, 2011, just one day after losing the season finale to Wyoming 22–19, Fairchild was fired.

On December 13, 2011, Colorado State hired Alabama offensive coordinator Jim McElwain to take over as head coach. McElwain remained with the Crimson Tide through the remainder of the bowl season before taking over at CSU, and won a second national championship with Alabama when they defeated LSU 21–0 in the BCS Championship Game on January 9, 2012. McElwain's tenure at CSU began on a high note. In his first game the Rams defeated rival Colorado 22–17 on September 1, 2012. The Rams finished 4–8 in McElwain's first season and improved to 8–6 in 2013. After leading the Rams to their best season since 2003, with a record of 10–2, McElwain won the 2014 Mountain West Conference Coach of the Year honors. Just a couple days after that announcement in early December 2014, McElwain accepted the position of head coach at the University of Florida, making him the first football coach in CSU history to leave the team for another program.

=== Volleyball ===
In 2004, the Rams women's volleyball team made it to the Sweet Sixteen round of the NCAA tournament. The 2007 squad advanced to a 13th straight NCAA tournament and recorded its 13th straight 20-win season. The team has won the Mountain West Conference regular season 6 of the past 8 years, and 4 of 8 MWC tournaments. Coach Tom Hilbert is in his 11th year, with a 283–70 record with Colorado State. CSU volleyball has a 656–351 all-time record since beginning play in 1976. CSU hosted one of four NCAA regionals in 2008.

=== Basketball ===
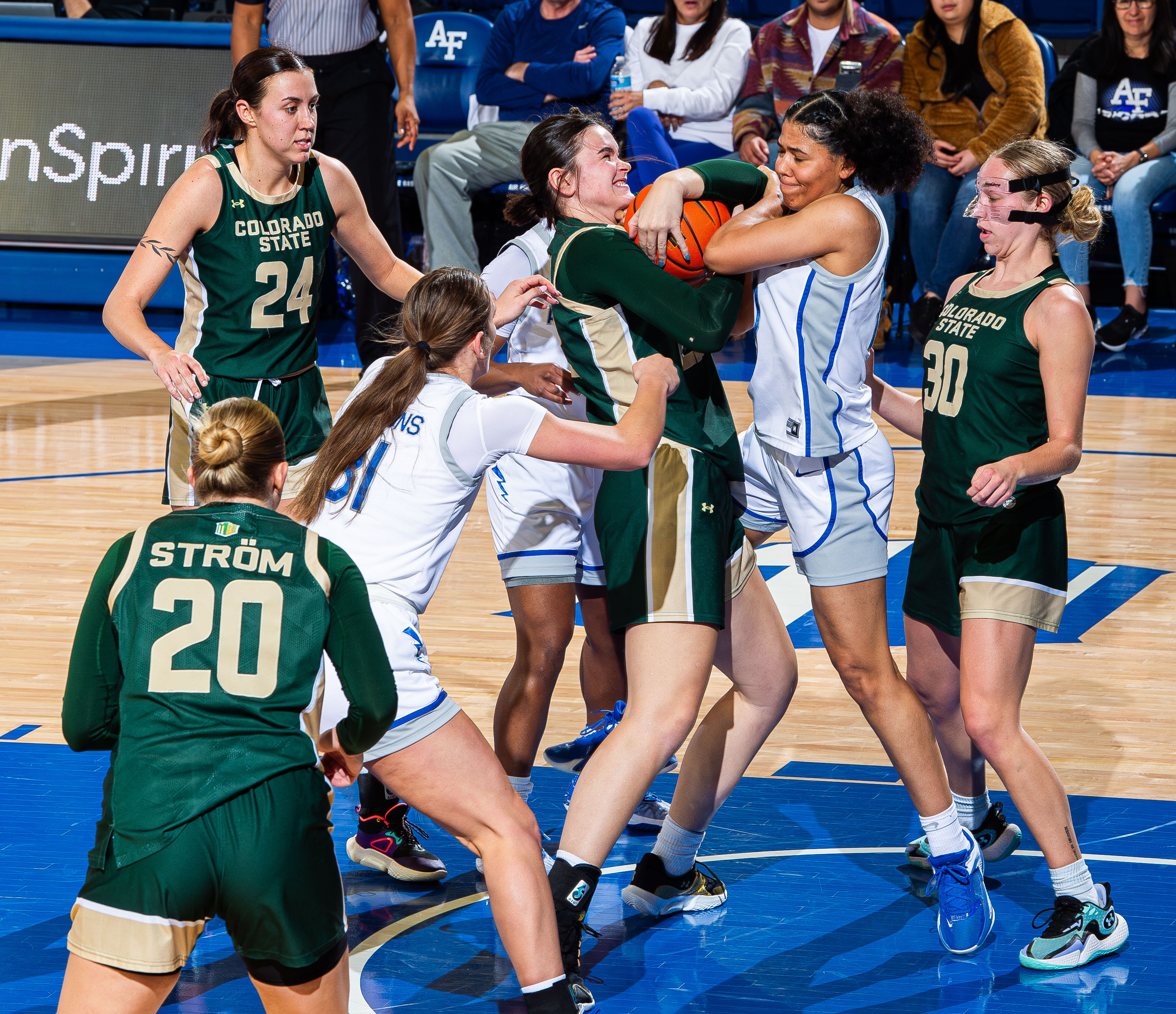
A Rams women's basketball game against Air Force in 2024

The dominant historical figure of Colorado State men's basketball is Jim Williams. Williams coached CSU for 26 seasons beginning in 1955, winning 352 games and taking the team to four NCAA tournaments, including making it to the Elite Eight in 1969, the program's deepest run the NCAA tournament. He also led the team to two upsets of UCLA, then led by legendary coach John Wooden. Entering the 2005–06 season, 30% of all CSU men's basketball games had been coached by Williams.

In 1988, Boyd Grant, a standout under Williams, returned to CSU to coach. That same season the Rams made their first postseason appearance in over two decades, climbing to third place in the NIT. The team's success continued in 1989 and 1990 with consecutive Western Athletic Conference titles and NCAA appearances. However, it would be until 2003 before the Rams claimed another conference title.

Jason Smith became only the second CSU player to be picked in the first round of the NBA draft. Tim Miles was hired to lead the Rams in March 2007. Under Miles the program gradually improved, culminating with the Rams' first at-large bid to the NCAA Tournament in more than two decades in 2012. Following the season, Miles departed for the head coaching position at Nebraska.

Colorado State then hired Southern Miss coach Larry Eustachy to take over in April 2012. The program flourished the following season, cracking the top 25 for the first time since 1954 and setting a record for most wins. The Rams went 26–9, finished in second place in the Mountain West, and earned an at-large bid to the NCAA Tournament again. CSU defeated Missouri 84–72 in the first round, marking their first NCAA Tournament win since 1989, before falling to top-seed Louisville in the second round.

In 2018, the Rams hired Niko Medved to replace Eustachy who resigned from the program. Under Medved, CSU reached the NCAA tournament three times in 2022, 2024, and 2025. During the 2024-25 season, CSU ranked No. 13 in the country, the highest ranking in school history. CSU also reached the Round of 32 in 2025 before falling on a buzzer-beating shot against Maryland. Medved left CSU for Minnesota and Ali Farokhmanesh was hired in 2025. CSU produced two more first round picks under Medved including David Roddy and Nique Clifford. NBA player Isaiah Stevens also played five years under Medved, finishing as the schools all-time leader in points, games, assists, and more.

The CSU women's basketball team began play in 1974, and has a 482–434 all-time record entering the 2007 season. The team has 7 all-time NCAA appearances, most recently in 2026, and previously in 1996, 1998, 1999, 2001, 2002, and 2016. The Rams made it to the Sweet Sixteen in 1999, the culmination of a successful 4-year run behind team leaders Becky Hammon and Katie Cronin. Hammon, owner of most major CSU basketball records, and Cronin both went on to successful careers in the WNBA, and Hammon has since become the first full-time female coach in one of the four major U.S. professional leagues, serving as an assistant with the NBA's San Antonio Spurs.

Ryun Williams has coached the Rams since 2012, winning Mountain West coach of the year twice in 2014 and 2016, four Mountain West regular season titles in 2014, 2015, 2016, and 2017, and earning two NCAA tournament appearances in 2016 and 2026 after winning the Mountain West tournament in both these years.

== Club teams ==
Colorado State also is home to competitive sports club teams in skiing, lacrosse, baseball, triathlon, rugby, hockey, shotgun sports, polo, archery and more. The Rams men's club lacrosse team is the six-time Men's Collegiate Lacrosse Association national champion in 1999, 2001, 2003, 2006, 2012 and 2013. CSU women's lacrosse also won USL-WDIA championships in 2008, 2010, and 2012. The CSU club baseball team won three consecutive National Club Baseball Association National Championships in 2004, 2005, and 2006 and then three further consecutive national championships in 2008, 2009 and 2010. The Disc Golf team won the national championship in 2012. The CSU Men's Hockey program were National runner-up in the 1993-94 season, and won the ACHA National Championship in 1994-1995 season. They were led by their Captain, Matt Krueger #3.

=== Triathlon ===
The Colorado State Triathlon Club in the 20teens has emerged as one of the top teams in the nation. Their women's team in 2016 and 2017 placed 5th at the national championships in Tuscaloosa, AL and in 2018 had a historic sweep of the podium and was 2nd overall team due to a costly penalty. Combined Men's and Women's team have also achieved 5th place nationally. They compete in the Mountain Collegiate Triathlon Conference (MCTC) along with schools from Colorado, Wyoming, Utah, Arizona, and New Mexico region. University of Colorado has won the last 8 conference championships.

=== Rugby ===
The Colorado State Rugby Club was founded in 1970, and plays college rugby in the West Conference of Division 1-A against rivals such as Colorado and Wyoming. The Rams are led by head coach Justin Mort, and play their home matches at the CSU Intramural Fields. The Rams made the national playoffs in 1975 finishing 5th, and in 1998 finishing 12th. More recently, the Rams won the West Conference in 2013 to qualify for the quarterfinals of the national playoffs.

=== Shotgun Sports ===
The Colorado State University Shotgun Sports is a co-ed club sport team that was founded in 1973. It is the only collegiate shotgun sports team recognized by a university in Colorado. The team is completely independent, and does not have a coach. The team competes with other colleges primarily in the American Midwest, mainly teams in Kansas, and Nebraska. The team competes in the ACUI Clay Targets league, with different competitions held in Las Vegas NV, Nashville TN, and the national championships in San Antonio TX. Every year, the Shotgun Sports team hosts their home competition in Brighton, Colorado, called RamVitational, where local universities face off and compete for different awards.

== Mascot ==
The ram was named the official mascot of Colorado State in 1946. By the end of the decade, the nickname of "Aggies" had evolved to "Aggie Rams", and eventually became simply "Rams".

"CAM the Ram" is the current representation of the official mascot. CAM is the 25th official Ram mascot. The first school mascot was introduced in 1947. There have been both live and costumed versions of the mascot. The 2006 version of CAM was a Rambouillet sheep and the 21st ram to represent the university. CAM was named using an acronym for the school's former short-form name, Colorado A&M. CAM runs at the beginning and at half time during home football games. Currently, there are eight Ram Handlers that take care of CAM the Ram.

== Notable athletes ==
Swimmer Amy Van Dyken, six-time Olympic gold medalist, was an NCAA champion and All-American at CSU. Van Dyken returned to Colorado State to train under current head coach John Mattos for the 2000 Olympics, having won four medals in 1996, the first female athlete in US history to do so in one Olympic Games. Glenn Morris, a track and football standout at Colorado A&M in 1935, won gold in the decathlon at the 1936 Olympics in Berlin. Morris was inducted into the USATF Hall of Fame in 2007.

Other notable athletes to graduate from CSU include Thurman "Fum" McGraw, CSU's first football consensus All-American in 1948. He led CSU to its first-ever bowl game, the 1949 Raisin Bowl. McGraw would remain at CSU for more than 40 years in various coaching and administrative positions. Bill Green, the school's first consensus All-American in basketball in 1962 and 1963, was later a first round draft pick by the Boston Celtics. CSU alum Lonnie Wright boasted the rare accomplishment of playing professional football and basketball during the same year, with the Denver Broncos and the Denver Rockets in 1967. Although the school no longer fields a varsity baseball team, former Major League pitchers Felix "Tippy" Martinez, Mark Huismann, Mark Knudson, and Frankie Gonzalez all played for the Rams. During her four years at CSU in the 1990s, basketball star Becky Hammon scored more points than any male or female player in school history. Hammon went on to become a WNBA all-star and assistant coach of the San Antonio Spurs, notably becoming the first woman to hold a full-time coaching position in one of the country's four largest professional sports leagues.
