= Windsor High School (Colorado) =

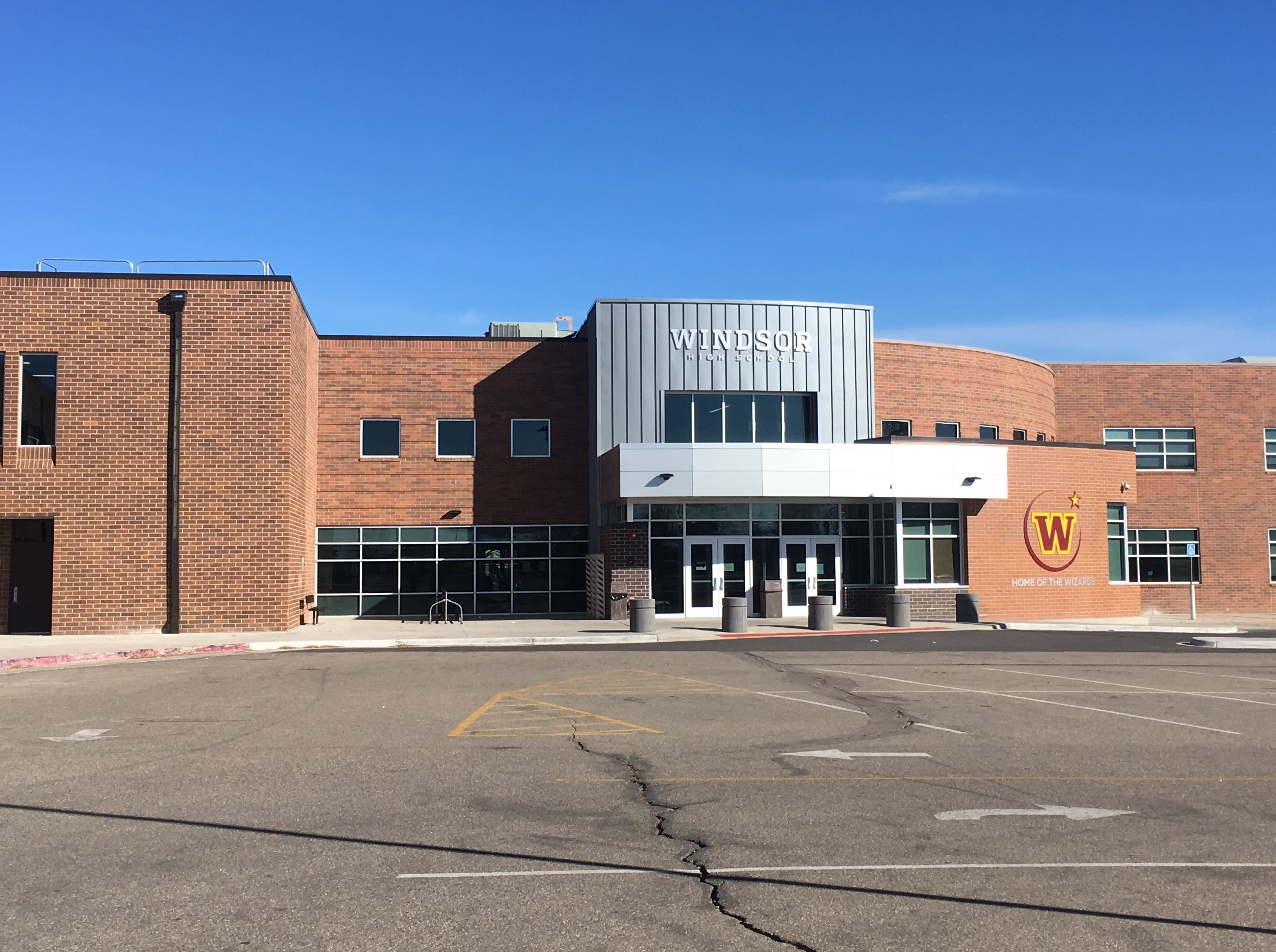

Location
- 1100 West Main Street; Windsor, Colorado 80550; United States
- Coordinates: 40°28′53″N 104°54′55″W

Information
- School type: Public high school
- School district: Weld RE-4
- CEEB code: 061470
- NCES School ID: 080735001264
- Principal: Richard Thomas
- Teaching staff: 56.68 (on an FTE basis)
- Grades: 9–12
- Gender: Coeducational
- Enrollment: 1,105 (2023–24)
- Student to teacher ratio: 19.50
- Campus type: Suburban, Large
- Colors: Maroon and gold
- Athletics conference: CHSAA
- Mascot: Wizard
- Website: whs.weldre4.org

Windsor High School is a public high school in Windsor, Colorado. It enrolled 1,105 students in the 2023–24 academic year.

== History ==
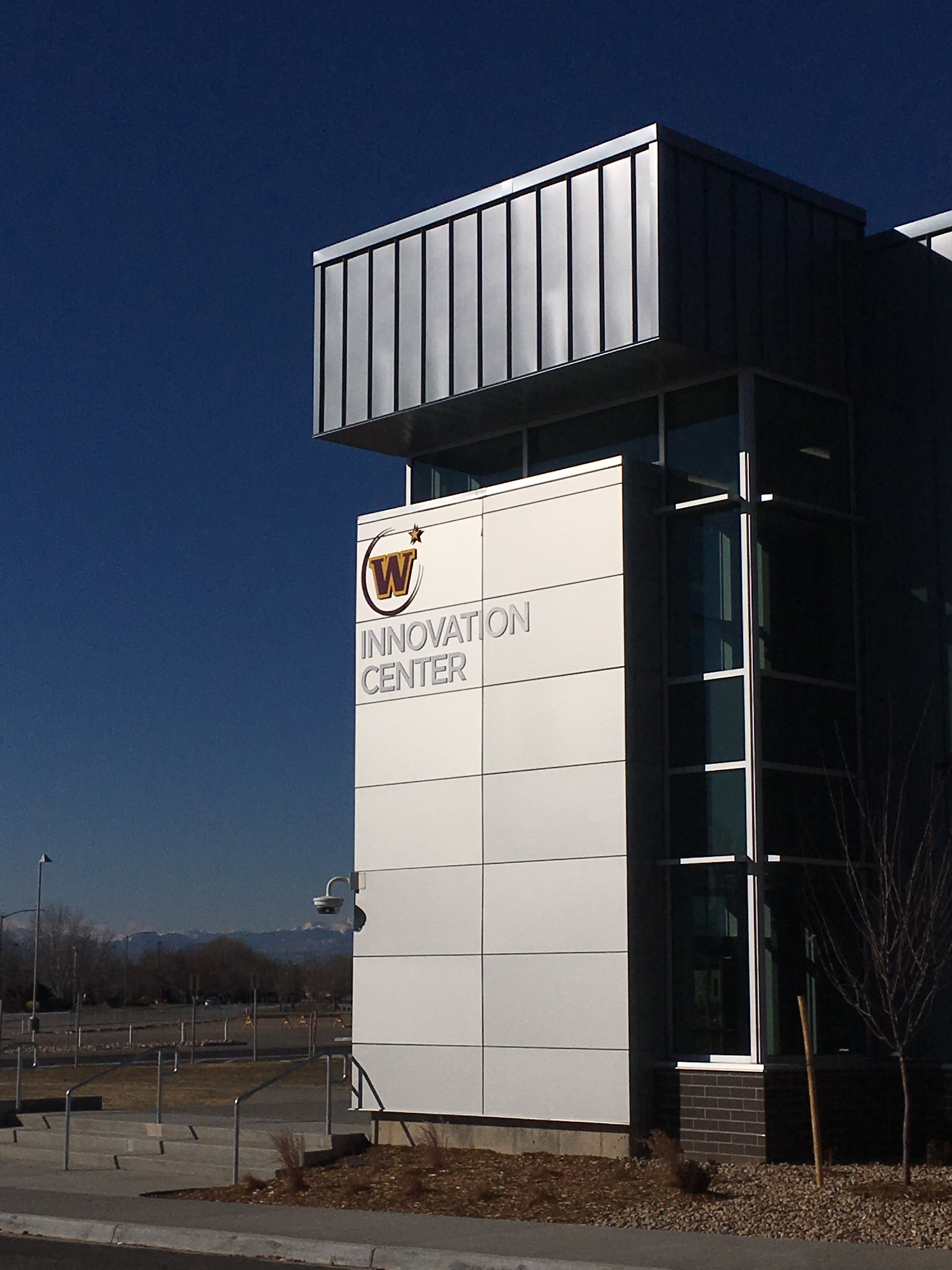
The Innovation Center was completed in 2018.

In 2018, Windsor High School was remodeled to include a new Innovation Center as well as updates to the other parts of the building. The addition includes space for more hands-on classes as well as meeting current code and ADA regulations. The addition and renovation were made possible by a $104.8 million bond.

== Extracurricular activities ==
=== Athletics ===
Windsor offers several sports, including football, basketball, swimming, track, lacrosse, golf, tennis and cross country.

The boys' basketball team went to state competition in 1924, and then went on to win the national competition.

=== Choir & Theatre ===
Windsor's vocal jazz ensemble, Wizardry, has been selected twice as the Winner of the "Large Vocal Jazz Ensemble" category at the international DownBeat Student Music Awards in 2025 and 2026. One of its students was also recognized as an Outstanding Soloist.

Windsor's theatre program was recognized in 2026 at the Bobby G Awards — Colorado's awards program for high school musical theatre students — with 8 nominations and 2 wins, including a win for "Outstanding Overall Production of a Musical." WHS has had two students nominated for "Outstanding Performance in a Leading Role," the precursor to the national Jimmy Awards.

=== Band ===
The marching band was selected to perform for President Barack Obama's inaugural parade on January 20, 2009.

The band has won Colorado Bandmasters' Association (CBA) State Championships in 1991, 1992, 2008, and 2011.

The band was selected to march in the 75th Pearl Harbor Memorial Parade in Hawaii on December 7, 2016, where they received the first place prize in the parade competition.

== Notable alumni ==
- Wyett Ekeler (2020), NFL safety for the Indianapolis Colts
