= List of Colorado State Rams football seasons =

The Colorado State Rams football team represents Colorado State University in the Mountain West Conference at the NCAA Division I FBS level in college football. Colorado State has played in over 1,000 games in over a century of play, including 17 bowl games. The following are the yearly results, game-by-game yearly results, and detailed bowl results of the team. The Rams had interruptions occur from 1895–1898 and 1943–1944.

== Yearly results ==
Year	Coach	Overall	Conference	Standing	Bowl/playoffs	Coaches^{#}	AP^{°}
Colorado Football Association (1893–1908)
1892–93	No coach	2–2					
1893	No coach	1–3					
1894	No coach	0–1					
1899	W. J. Forbes	1–2–1					
1900	George Toomey	1–3					
1901	C. J. Griffith	1–3					
1902	C. J. Griffith	1–3–2					
1903	C. J. Griffith	6–1					
1904	John H. McIntosh	0–4–1					
1905	John H. McIntosh	3–4					
1906	Claude Rothgeb	1–2–1					
1907	Claude Rothgeb	0–4					
1908	Claude Rothgeb	1–3					
Rocky Mountain Athletic Conference (1909–1937)
1909	Claude Rothgeb	1–2					
1910	George Cassidy	0–5					
1911	Harry W. Hughes	0–6					
1912	Harry W. Hughes	3–2		T–3rd			
1913	Harry W. Hughes	3–2		3rd			
1914	Harry W. Hughes	3–4		4th			
1915	Harry W. Hughes	7–0		1st			
1916	Harry W. Hughes	6–0–1		1st			
1917	Harry W. Hughes	0–7–1		8th			
1918	Harry W. Hughes	0–2		3rd			
1919	Harry W. Hughes	7–1		1st			
1920	Harry W. Hughes	6–1–1		1st			
1921	Harry W. Hughes	2–3–1		T–4th			
1922	Harry W. Hughes	5–2–1		2nd			
1923	Harry W. Hughes	5–2–1		T–2nd			
1924	Harry W. Hughes	4–2		T–2nd			
1925	Harry W. Hughes	9–1		1st			
1926	Harry W. Hughes	6–2–1		T–4th			
1927	Harry W. Hughes	7–1		1st			
1928	Harry W. Hughes	6–2		3rd			
1929	Harry W. Hughes	5–4		8th			
1930	Harry W. Hughes	3–5–1		T–5th			
1931	Harry W. Hughes	5–4		T–2nd			
1932	Harry W. Hughes	4–3–1		5th			
1933	Harry W. Hughes	5–1–1		T–1st			
1934	Harry W. Hughes	6–2–1		T–1st			
1935	Harry W. Hughes	3–4–1		9th			
1936	Harry W. Hughes	4–4–1		T–7th			
1937	Harry W. Hughes	1–7		11th			
Mountain States Conference (1938–1947)
1938	Harry W. Hughes	1–5–2		7th			
1939	Harry W. Hughes	2–7		6th			
1940	Harry W. Hughes	3–4–2		6th			
1941	Harry W. Hughes	4–2–1		T–4th			
1942	Julius Wagner	4–3		T–4th			
1945	Julius Wagner	2–5–1		T–2nd			
1946	Julius Wagner	2–7		T–2nd			
1947	Bob Davis	5–4–1		5th			
Skyline Conference (1948–1961)
1948	Bob Davis	8–3		2nd	L Raisin		
1949	Bob Davis	9–1		2nd			
1950	Bob Davis	6–3		2nd			
1951	Bob Davis	5–4–1		4th			
1952	Bob Davis	6–4		3rd			
1953	Bob Davis	4–5		5th			
1954	Bob Davis	3–7		6th			
1955	Bob Davis	8–2		1st			
1956	Don Mullison	2–7–1		5th			
1957	Don Mullison	3–7		T–6th			
1958	Don Mullison	6–4		4th			
1959	Don Mullison	6–4		2nd			
1960	Don Mullison	2–8		T–7th			
1961	Don Mullison	0–10		7th			
Independent (1962–1967)
1962	Mike Lude	0–10					
1963	Mike Lude	3–7					
1964	Mike Lude	5–6					
1965	Mike Lude	4–6					
1966	Mike Lude	7–3					
1967	Mike Lude	4–5–1					
Western Athletic Conference (1968–1998)
1968	Mike Lude	2–8	1–2	6th			
1969	Mike Lude	4–6	0–4	8th			
1970	Jerry Wampfler	4–7	1–3	5th			
1971	Jerry Wampfler	3–8	1–4	7th			
1972	Jerry Wampfler	1–10	1–4	7th			
1973	Sark Arslanian	5–6	2–4	8th			
1974	Sark Arslanian	4–6–1	2–3–1	6th			
1975	Sark Arslanian	6–5	4–2	3rd			
1976	Sark Arslanian	6–5	2–4	7th			
1977	Sark Arslanian	9–2–1	5–2	3rd			
1978	Sark Arslanian	5–6	2–4	T–5th			
1979	Sark Arslanian	4–7–1	3–4	T–5th			
1980	Sark Arslanian	6–4–1	5–1–1	2nd			
1981	Sark Arslanian / Chester Caddas	0–12	0–8	9th			
1982	Leon Fuller	4–7	3–5	6th			
1983	Leon Fuller	5–7	4–4	T–5th			
1984	Leon Fuller	3–8	3–5	7th			
1985	Leon Fuller	5–7	4–4	5th			
1986	Leon Fuller	6–5	4–4	T–4th			
1987	Leon Fuller	1–11	1–7	8th			
1988	Leon Fuller	1–10	1–7	T–8th			
1989	Earle Bruce	5–5–1	4–3	T–5th			
1990	Earle Bruce	9–4	6–1	2nd	W Freedom		
1991	Earle Bruce	3–8	2–6	T–8th			
1992	Earle Bruce	5–7	3–5	T–7th			
1993	Sonny Lubick	5–6	5–3	T–4th			
1994	Sonny Lubick	10–2	7–1	1st	L Holiday	14	16
1995	Sonny Lubick	8–4	6–2	T–1st	L Holiday		
1996	Sonny Lubick	7–5	6–2	T–2nd (Pacific)			
1997	Sonny Lubick	11–2	7–1	1st (Pacific)	W Holiday	16	17
1998	Sonny Lubick	8–4	5–3	3rd (Mountain)			
Mountain West Conference (1999–present)
1999	Sonny Lubick	8–4	5–2	T–1st	L Liberty		
2000	Sonny Lubick	10–2	7–1	1st	W Liberty	15	14
2001	Sonny Lubick	7–5	5–2	2nd	W New Orleans		
2002	Sonny Lubick	10–4	6–1	1st	L Liberty		
2003	Sonny Lubick	7–6	4–3	3rd	L San Francisco		
2004	Sonny Lubick	4–7	3–4	6th			
2005	Sonny Lubick	6–6	5–3	3rd	L Poinsettia		
2006	Sonny Lubick	4–8	1–7	8th			
2007	Sonny Lubick	3–9	2–6	8th			
2008	Steve Fairchild	7–6	4–4	5th	W New Mexico		
2009	Steve Fairchild	3–9	0–8	9th			
2010	Steve Fairchild	3–9	2–6	T–6th			
2011	Steve Fairchild	3–9	1–6	T–6th			
2012	Jim McElwain	4–8	3–5	7th			
2013	Jim McElwain	8–6	5–3	3rd (Mountain)	W New Mexico		
2014	Jim McElwain	10–3	6–2	2nd (Mountain)	L Las Vegas		
2015	Mike Bobo	7–6	5–3	5th (Mountain)	L Arizona		
2016	Mike Bobo	7–6	5–3	T–4th (Mountain)	L Famous Idaho Potato		
2017	Mike Bobo	7–6	5–3	3rd (Mountain)	L New Mexico		
2018	Mike Bobo	3–9	2–6	5th (Mountain)			
2019	Mike Bobo	4–8	3–5	5th (Mountain)			
2020	Steve Addazio	1–3	1–3	10th			
2021	Steve Addazio	3–9	2–6	5th (Mountain)			
2022	Jay Norvell	3–9	3-5	5th (Mountain)			
2023	Jay Norvell	5–7	3-5	9th			
2024	Jay Norvell	8–5	6–1	T–2nd	L Arizona		
2025	Jay Norvell / Tyson Summers	2–10	1–7	12th			
Total:		550-631-33					
National championship Conference title Conference division title or championship game berth
^{†}Indicates Bowl Coalition, Bowl Alliance, BCS, or CFP / New Years' Six bowl.; ^{#}Rankings from final Coaches Poll.
