= Colorado College Tigers football, 1900–1909 =

American college football seasons

The Colorado College Tigers football program represented Colorado College of Colorado Springs, Colorado. This article covers the program's third decades of intercollegiate football from 1900 to 1909. Significant milestones in the period covered include the following:

- In 1899 and 1900, Colorado College won consecutive Colorado Football Association championships, defeating the University of Colorado both years.
- Colorado College began competition with Colorado Agricultural (later renamed Colorado State) and won eight of the first ten matches between 1900 and 1910.
- On October 12, 1906, Colorado College defeated Utah, the only blemish on an otherwise undefeated season for Utah.
- On October 17 and 24, 1908, Colorado College won back-to-back games against Texas and Utah, both of which are now Power Five programs.

== 1900 ==
1900 Colorado College Tigers football
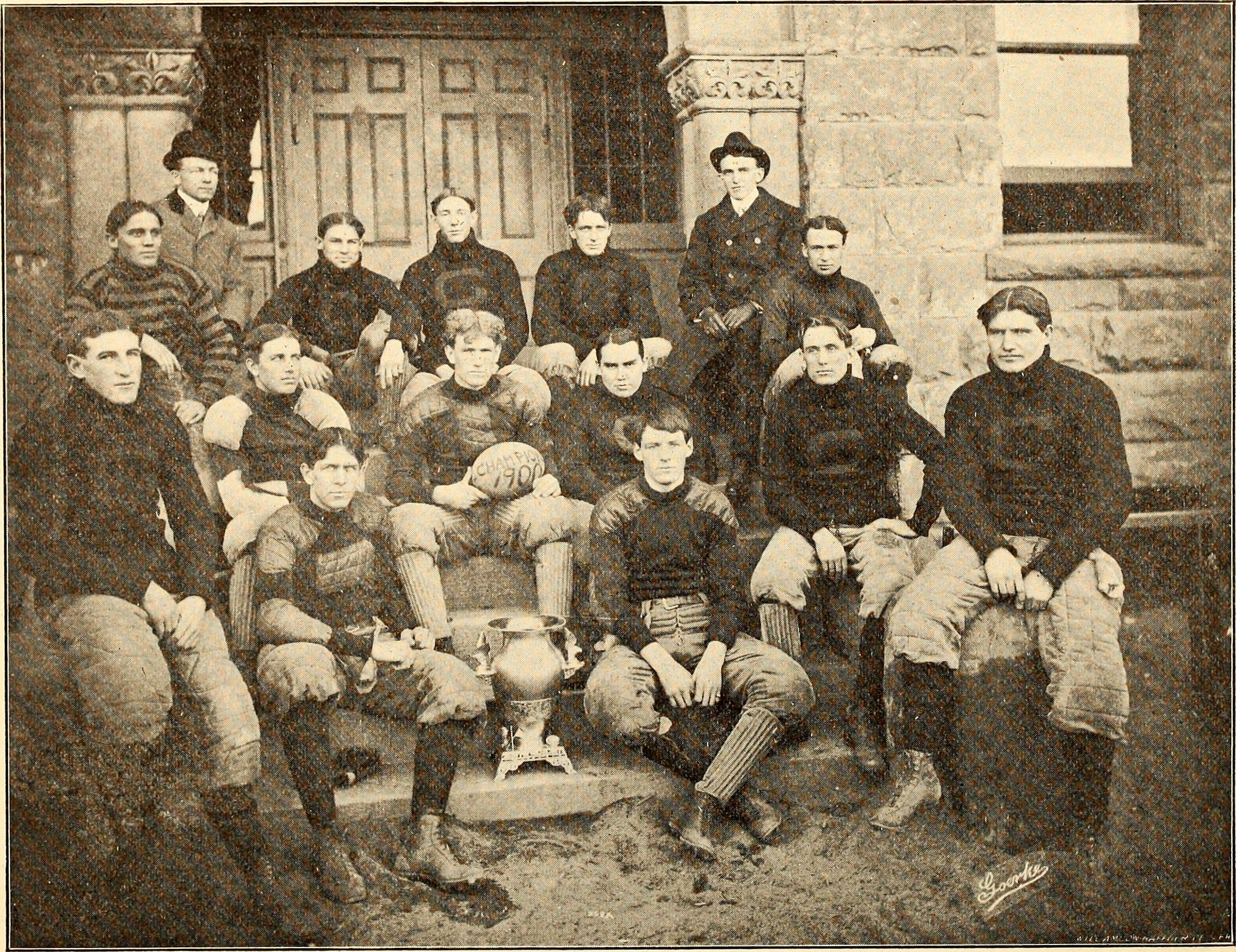

CFA champion
- Conference: Colorado Football Association
- Record: 7–2 (3–0 CFA)
- Head coach: J. C. Ewing (1st season)
- Captain: Ben Griffith
- Home stadium: Washburn Field

1900 Colorado Football Association standings
	Conf.					Overall
Team	W		L		T	W		L		T
Colorado College $	3	–	0	–	0	6	–	2	–	0
Colorado Mines	2	–	1	–	0	4	–	3	–	0
Colorado	1	–	2	–	0	6	–	4	–	0
Colorado Agricultural	0	–	3	–	0	1	–	3	–	0
$ – Conference champion

The 1900 Colorado College Tigers football team represented Colorado College as a member of the Colorado Football Association (CFA) during the 1900 college football season. In its first season under head coach J. C. Ewing, the team compiled a 7–2 record (3–0 against conference opponents), won the CFA championship, and outscored opponents by a total of 247 to 60.

Date	Opponent	Site	Result	Source
September 29	Denver East High School*	Washburn Field; Colorado Springs, CO	W 29–0	
October 2	Colorado Springs High School	Washburn Field; Colorado Springs, CO	W 18–2	
October 6	Victor All-Stars	Washburn Field; Colorado Springs, CO	W 11–0	
October 13	at Colorado Agricultural	Durkee Field; Fort Collins, CO	W 53–0	
October 20	Colorado State Normal	Washburn Field; Colorado Springs, CO	W 71–0	
October 27	Washburn	Washburn Field; Colorado Springs, CO	L 5–29	
November 6	at Denver Wheel Club	Denver, CO	L 0–29	
November 17	Colorado	Washburn Field; Colorado Springs, CO	W 21–0	
November 29	Colorado Mines	Washburn Field; Colorado Springs, CO	W 39–0	
*Non-conference game

== 1901 ==
1901 Colorado College Tigers football
- Conference: Colorado Football Association
- Record: 5–1 (2–1 CFA)
- Head coach: J. C. Ewing (2nd season)
- Home stadium: Washburn Field

1901 Colorado Football Association standings
	Conf.					Overall
Team	W		L		T	W		L		T
Colorado $	2	–	0	–	0	5	–	1	–	1
Colorado College	2	–	1	–	0	5	–	1	–	0
Colorado Mines	1	–	2	–	0	1	–	4	–	0
Colorado Agricultural	0	–	2	–	0	1	–	2	–	0
$ – Conference champion; Colorado vs. Colorado Agricultural game not played due to alleged amateurism violation

The 1901 Colorado College Tigers football team represented Colorado College as a member of the Colorado Football Association (CFA) during the 1901 college football season. In its second and final season under head coach J. C. Ewing, the team compiled a 5–1 record (2–1 against conference opponents), finished in second place in the CFA, and outscored opponents by a total of 82 to 16.

Date	Opponent	Site	Result	Source
September 28	Colorado Springs High School*	Washburn Field; Colorado Springs, CO	W 5–0	
October 12	Denver West High School*	Washburn Field; Colorado Springs, CO	W 35–0	
October 19	Colorado Springs High School*	Washburn Field; Colorado Springs, CO	W 12–0	
October 26	Colorado Agricultural	Washburn Field; Colorado Springs, CO	W 16–0	
November 5	at Colorado	Gamble Field; Boulder, CO	L 2–11	
November 28	Colorado Mines	Washburn Field; Colorado Springs, CO	W 12–5	
*Non-conference game

== 1902 ==
1902 Colorado College Tigers football
- Conference: Colorado Football Association
- Record: 3–4 (2–2 CFA)
- Head coach: Fred Caldwell (1st season)
- Home stadium: Washburn Field

1902 Colorado Football Association standings
	Conf.					Overall
Team	W		L		T	W		L		T
Colorado $	4	–	0	–	0	5	–	1	–	0
Colorado Mines	2	–	1	–	1	4	–	1	–	2
Colorado College	2	–	2	–	0	3	–	4	–	0
Denver	1	–	3	–	0	3	–	4	–	1
Colorado Agricultural	0	–	3	–	1	1	–	3	–	2
$ – Conference champion

The 1902 Colorado College Tigers football team represented Colorado College as a member of the Colorado Football Association (CFA) during the 1902 college football season. In its first and only season under head coach Fred Caldwell, the team compiled a 3–4 record (2–2 against conference opponents), finished in third place in the CFA, and was outscored by a total of 65 to 57.

Date	Time	Opponent	Site	Result	Source
September 27		Colorado Springs High School*	Washburn Field; Colorado Springs, CO	L 5–12 or 6-12	
October 11		Denver Athletic Club*	Washburn Field; Colorado Springs, CO	W 11–6	
October 25		at Colorado	Boulder, CO	L 6–12	
November 4	3:00 p.m.	at Colorado Agricultural	Fort Collins, CO	W 29–6	
November 15		at Denver	Denver, CO	W 6–0	
November 22		at Denver Athletic Club*	Denver, CO	L 0–12	
November 27		Colorado Mines	Washburn Field; Colorado Springs, CO	L 0–17	
*Non-conference game

== 1903 ==
1903 Colorado College Tigers football
- Conference: Colorado Football Association
- Record: 4–5 (1–3 CFA)
- Head coach: Edward S. Merrill (1st season)
- Home stadium: Washburn Field

1903 Colorado Football Association standings
	Conf.					Overall
Team	W		L		T	W		L		T
Colorado $	4	–	0	–	0	8	–	2	–	0
Colorado Agricultural	3	–	1	–	0	5	–	1	–	0
Colorado Mines	2	–	2	–	0	3	–	4	–	0
Colorado College	1	–	3	–	0	4	–	5	–	0
Denver	0	–	4	–	0	6	–	7	–	0
$ – Conference champion

The 1903 Colorado College Tigers football team represented Colorado College as a member of the Colorado Football Association (CFA) during the 1903 college football season. In its first and only season under head coach Edward S. Merrill, the team compiled a record of 4–5, finished in fourth place in the CFA, and outscored opponents by a total of either 135 to 106.

Date	Opponent	Site	Result	Source
September 12	Colorado Springs High School*	Washburn Field; Colorado Springs, CO	W 38–0	
September 26	Haskell*	Washburn Field; Colorado Springs, CO	L 0–45	
October 10	Golden High School*	Washburn Field; Colorado Springs, CO	W 40–0	
October 17	Colorado College alumni*	Washburn Field; Colorado Springs, CO	L 5–6	
October 24	Denver	Washburn Field; Colorado Springs, CO	W 6–0	
November 3	Colorado Agricultural	Washburn Field; Colorado Springs, CO	L 5–8	
November 7	at Pueblo Centennial High School*	Pueblo, CO	W 30–0	
November 14	at Colorado	Gamble Field; Boulder, CO	L 6–31	
November 26	Colorado Mines	Washburn Field; Colorado Springs, CO	L 5–16	
*Non-conference game

== 1904 ==
1904 Colorado College Tigers football
- Conference: Colorado Football Association
- Record: 6–3–1 (1–2–1 CFA)
- Head coach: William Juneau (1st season)
- Home stadium: Washburn Field

1904 Colorado Football Association standings
	Conf.					Overall
Team	W		L		T	W		L		T
Colorado Mines $	3	–	0	–	1	3	–	0	–	1
Colorado	3	–	1	–	0	6	–	2	–	1
Denver	2	–	2	–	0	2	–	5	–	0
Colorado College	1	–	2	–	1	6	–	3	–	1
Colorado Agricultural	0	–	4	–	0	0	–	4	–	1
$ – Conference champion

The 1904 Colorado College Tigers football team represented Colorado College as a member of the Colorado Football Association (CFA) during the 1904 college football season. In its first and only season under head coach William Juneau, the team compiled a 6–3–1 record (1–2–1 against conference opponents), shut out five of ten opponents, and was outscored by all opponents by a total of 89 to 85.

Date	Opponent	Site	Result	Source
September 24	Colorado Springs High School*	Washburn Field; Colorado Springs, CO	W 12–0	
October 1	Pueblo Centennial High School*	Washburn Field; Colorado Springs, CO	W 6–5	
October 8	Denver	Washburn Field; Colorado Springs, CO	W 5–0	
October 15	at Regis*	Denver, CO	W 41–0	
October 22	Colorado College alumni*	Washburn Field; Colorado Springs, CO	W 5–0	
October 29	Colorado	Washburn Field; Colorado Springs, CO	L 0–23	
November 5	at Denver	Denver, CO	L 8–14	
November 12	at Colorado Agricultural	Durkee Field; Fort Collins, CO	W 4–0	
November 19	at Colorado Mines	Franklin Field; Golden, CO	T 4–4	
November 24	at Utah*	Cummings Field; Salt Lake City, UT	L 0–43	
*Non-conference game

== 1905 ==
1905 Colorado College Tigers football
- Conference: Colorado Football Association
- Record: 5–2–1 ( CFA)
- Head coach: John R. Richards (1st season)
- Home stadium: Washburn Field

The 1905 Colorado College Tigers football team represented Colorado College as a member of the Colorado Football Association (CFA) during the 1905 college football season. In its first season under head coach John R. Richards, the team compiled a 5–2–1 record, shut out seven of eight opponents, and outscored all opponents by a total of 89 to 6.

Date	Opponent	Site	Result	Source
September 29	Colorado Springs High School*	Washburn Field; Colorado Springs, CO	L 0–6	
October 7	Denver North High School*	Washburn Field; Colorado Springs, CO	W 36–0	
October 14	at Denver	Denver, CO	T 0–0	
October 21	at Denver Athletic Club*	Denver, CO	W 4–0	
November 4	Colorado Agricultural	Washburn Field; Colorado Springs, CO	W 33–0	
November 11	Denver	Washburn Field; Colorado Springs, CO	W 10–0	
November 18	Colorado Mines	Washburn Field; Colorado Springs, CO	L 0–0 (forfeit)	
November 30	at Washburn*	Topeka, KS	W 6–0	
*Non-conference game

== 1906 ==
1906 Colorado College Tigers football
- Conference: Colorado Football Association
- Record: 3–2–2 (1–2–1 CFA)
- Head coach: John R. Richards (2nd season)
- Home stadium: Washburn Field

1906 Colorado Football Association standings
	Conf.					Overall
Team	W		L		T	W		L		T
Colorado Mines $	2	–	0	–	2	2	–	0	–	2
Colorado	1	–	1	–	2	2	–	3	–	4
Denver	2	–	2	–	0	2	–	3	–	0
Colorado College	1	–	2	–	1	3	–	2	–	2
Colorado Agricultural	1	–	2	–	1	1	–	2	–	1
$ – Conference champion

The 1906 Colorado College Tigers football team represented Colorado College as a member of the Colorado Football Association (CFA) during the 1906 college football season. In its second season under head coach John R. Richards, the team compiled a 3–2–2 record (1–2–1 against conference opponents), finished in fourth place in the CFA, held six opponents to four or fewer points, and outscored all opponents by a total of 27 to 19.

Date	Opponent	Site	Result	Source
September 29	Colorado Springs High School*	Washburn Field; Colorado Springs, CO	W 5–4	
October 6	Denver East High School*	Washburn Field; Colorado Springs, CO	T 0–0	
October 13	Utah*	Washburn Field; Colorado Springs, CO	W 6–0	
October 27	Colorado Agricultural	Washburn Field; Colorado Springs, CO	L 0–4	
November 6	at Colorado	Boulder, CO	W 6–0	
November 17	vs. Colorado Mines	Denver, CO	T 4–4	
November 29	Denver	Washburn Field; Colorado Springs, CO	L 6–7	
*Non-conference game

== 1907 ==
1907 Colorado College Tigers football
- Conference: Colorado Football Association
- Record: 5–2 (3–1 CFA)
- Head coach: John R. Richards (3rd season)
- Home stadium: Washburn Field

1907 Colorado Football Association standings
	Conf.					Overall
Team	W		L		T	W		L		T
Colorado Mines $	4	–	0	–	0	5	–	1	–	0
Colorado College	3	–	1	–	0	5	–	2	–	0
Colorado	2	–	2	–	0	5	–	3	–	0
Denver	1	–	3	–	0	2	–	6	–	0
Colorado Agricultural	0	–	4	–	0	0	–	4	–	0
$ – Conference champion

The 1907 Colorado College Tigers football team represented Colorado College as a member of the Colorado Football Association (CFA) during the 1907 college football season. In its third season under head coach John R. Richards, the team compiled a 5–2 record (3–1 against conference opponents), finished in second place in the CFA, and outscored opponents by a total of 105 to 36.

Date	Opponent	Site	Result	Attendance	Source
September 28	Colorado Springs High School*	Washburn Field; Colorado Springs, CO	W 5–0		
October 5	Denver East High School*	Washburn Field; Colorado Springs, CO	W 40–0		
October 12	at Colorado Agricultural	Durkee Field; Fort Collins, CO	W 20–4		
October 26	at Denver	Denver, CO	W 20–4		
November 9	Colorado	Washburn Field; Colorado Springs, CO	W 10–0		
November 16	vs. Colorado Mines	Denver, CO	L 0–15	10,000	
November 28	at Utah*	Cummings Field; Salt Lake City, UT	L 10–13		
*Non-conference game

== 1908 ==
1908 Colorado College Tigers football
- Conference: Colorado Football Association
- Record: 5–2 (2–1 CFA)
- Head coach: John R. Richards (4th season)
- Home stadium: Washburn Field

1908 Colorado Football Association standings
	Conf.					Overall
Team	W		L		T	W		L		T
Denver $	4	–	0	–	0	7	–	1	–	0
Colorado	3	–	1	–	0	5	–	2	–	0
Colorado College	2	–	1	–	0	6	–	1	–	0
Colorado Agricultural	0	–	2	–	0	1	–	3	–	0
Colorado Mines	0	–	3	–	0	2	–	3	–	0
$ – Conference champion

The 1908 Colorado College Tigers football team represented Colorado College as a member of the Colorado Football Association (CFA) during the 1908 college football season. In its fourth season under head coach John R. Richards, the team compiled a 5–2 record (2–1 against conference opponents), finished in third place in the CFA, and outscored opponents by a total of 93 to 28.

Date	Opponent	Site	Result	Source
September 26	Colorado Springs High School*	Washburn Field; Colorado Springs, CO	W 5–0	
October 3	Colorado Springs High School*	Washburn Field; Colorado Springs, CO	W 29–0	
October 17	Utah*	Washburn Field; Colorado Springs, CO	W 18–4	
October 24	at Texas*	Clark Field; Austin, TX	W 16–0	
November 3	at Colorado	Boulder, CO	L 0–14	
November 14	vs. Colorado Mines	Denver, CO	W 22–4	
November 26	Denver*	Washburn Field; Colorado Springs, CO	L 4–6	
*Non-conference game

== 1909 ==
1909 Colorado College Tigers football
- Conference: Colorado Faculty Athletic Conference
- Record: 5–2 (2–1 CFAC)
- Head coach: John R. Richards (5th season)
- Home stadium: Washburn Field

1909 Colorado Faculty Athletic Conference football standings
	Conf.					Overall
Team	W		L		T	W		L		T
Colorado $	3	–	0	–	0	6	–	0	–	0
Colorado College	2	–	1	–	0	5	–	2	–	0
Colorado Mines	0	–	2	–	0	3	–	3	–	0
Colorado Agricultural	0	–	2	–	0	1	–	2	–	0
$ – Conference champion

The 1909 Colorado College Tigers football team represented Colorado College as a member of the Colorado Faculty Athletic Conference (CFAC) during the 1909 college football season. In its fifth and final season under head coach John R. Richards, the team compiled a 5–2 record (2–1 against conference opponents), finished in second place in the CFAC, and outscored opponents by a total of 172 to 53.

Date	Time	Opponent	Site	Result	Attendance	Source
September 25		Colorado Springs High School*	Washburn Field; Colorado Springs, CO	W 14–0		
October 16		vs. Colorado Mines		W 22–4		
October 23		Fort Russell (WY)*	Washburn Field; Colorado Springs, CO	W 55–0		
October 30		at Wyoming*	Laramie, WY	W 44–5		
November 6		Colorado Agricultural	Washburn Field; Colorado Springs, CO	W 31–0		
November 13	2:30 p.m.	Colorado	Washburn Field; Colorado Springs, CO	L 0–9		
November 25		at Denver*	University Park Field; Denver, CO	L 6–29	4,000	
*Non-conference game
