= List of Colorado State Rams head football coaches =

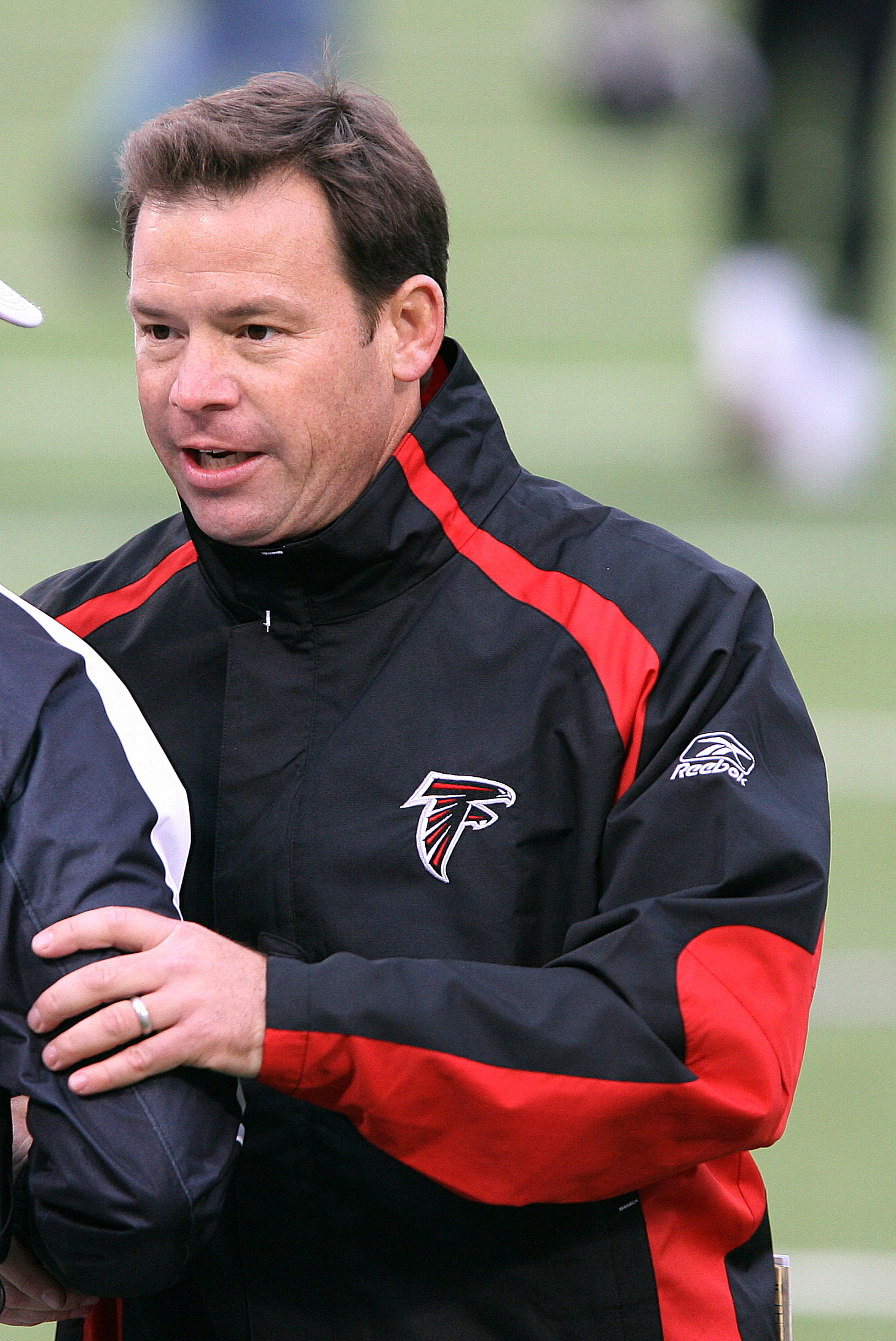
Jim L. Mora will serve as the head coach following the conclusion of the 2025 season.

The Colorado State Rams college football team represents Colorado State University in the Pac-12 Conference, as part of the NCAA Division I Football Bowl Subdivision. The program has had 22 head coaches, and 2 interim head coaches, since it began play during the 1892 season. Tyson Summers currently serves as the interim head coach following the firing of Jay Norvell in October 2025. UConn Huskies football head coach Jim L. Mora is set to serve as head coach at the conclusion of the 2025 season.

Seven coaches have led Colorado State in postseason bowl games: Bob Davis, Earle Bruce, Sonny Lubick, Steve Fairchild, Jim McElwain, Dave Baldwin, and Mike Bobo. Three coaches also won conference championships: Harry W. Hughes captured eight as a member of the Rocky Mountain Faculty Athletic Conference; Davis captured one as a member of Skyline Conference; Lubick captured three as a member of the Western Athletic Conference and three as a member of the Mountain West Conference.

Hughes is the leader in seasons coached, with 32 years as head coach and games coached (240) and won (126). Matt Rothwell has the highest all-time winning percentage at .833. George Cassidy has the lowest winning percentage of those who have coached more than one game, with .000. Of the 22 different head coaches who have led the Rams, Bruce has been inducted into the College Football Hall of Fame.

== Key ==
Key to symbols in coaches list
General		Overall		Conference		Postseason (Note: Although the first Rose Bowl Game was played in 1902, it has been continuously played since the 1916 game, and is recognized as the oldest bowl game by the NCAA. "—" indicates any season prior to 1916 when postseason games were not played.)	
No.	Order of coaches (Note: A running total of the number of head coaches, with coaches who served separate tenures being counted only once. Interim head coaches are represented with "Int" and are not counted in the running total. "—" indicates the team played but either without a coach or no coach is on record. "X" indicates an interim year without play.)	GC	Games coached	CW	Conference wins	PW	Postseason wins
DC	Division championships	OW	Overall wins	CL	Conference losses	PL	Postseason losses
CC	Conference championships	OL	Overall losses	CT	Conference ties	PT	Postseason ties
NC	National championships	OT	Overall ties (Note: Overtime rules in college football were introduced in 1996, making ties impossible in the period since.)	C%	Conference winning percentage		
†	Elected to the College Football Hall of Fame	O%	Overall winning percentage (Note: When computing the win–loss percentage, a tie counts as half a win and half a loss.)				

== Coaches ==
List of head football coaches showing season(s) coached, overall records, conference records, postseason records, championships and selected awards (Note: Statistics correct as of the end of the 2025 NCAA Division I FBS football season.)
No.	Name (Note: Colorado State did not have a head coach for their 1892–1894 seasons.)	Year(s) (Note: Colorado State did not field teams during the 1895–1898 or 1943–1944 seasons.)'	Season(s)	GC	OW	OL	OT	O%	CW	CL	CT	C%	PW	PL	PT	DC	CC	NC	Awards
1	W. J. Forbes	1899	1	3	0	2	1	0.167	0	2	0	.000	—	—	—	—	0	0	—
2	George Toomey	1900	1	4	1	3	0	0.250	0	3	0	.000	—	—	—	—	0	0	—
3	C. J. Griffith	1901–1902	2	9	2	5	2	0.333	0	5	1	0.083	—	—	—	—	0	0	—
4	Matt Rothwell	1903	1	6	5	1	0	0.833	3	1	0	0.750	—	—	—	—	0	0	—
5	John H. McIntosh	1904–1905	2	13	4	8	1	0.346	1	7	0	0.125	—	—	—	—	0	0	—
6	Claude Rothgeb	1906–1909	4	15	3	11	1	0.233	1	10	1	0.125	—	—	—	—	0	0	—
7	George Cassidy	1910	1	5	0	5	0	.000	0	4	0	.000	—	—	—	—	0	0	—
8	Harry W. Hughes	1911–1941; 1946	31, 1	240	126	96	18	0.563	114	77	17	0.589	—	—	—	—	8	0	—
9	Julius Wagner	1942; 1945–1946	1, 2	20	8	11	1	0.425	3	9	0	0.250	—	—	—	—	0	0	—
10	Bob Davis	1947–1955	9	89	54	33	2	0.618	34	20	2	0.625	0	1	0	—	1	0	—
11	Don Mullison	1956–1961	6	60	19	40	1	0.325	14	26	1	0.354	0	0	0	—	0	0	—
12	Mike Lude	1962–1969	8	81	29	51	1	0.364	1	8	0	0.111	0	0	0	—	0	0	—
13	Jerry Wampfler	1970–1972	3	33	8	25	0	0.242	3	11	0	0.214	0	0	0	—	0	0	—
14	Sark Arslanian	1973–1981	9	96	45	47	4	0.490	25	27	2	0.481	0	0	0	—	0	0	—
Int	Chester Caddas	1981	1	6	0	6	0	.000	0	5	0	.000	0	0	0	—	0	0	—
15	Leon Fuller	1982–1988	7	80	25	55	0	0.313	20	36	0	0.357	0	0	0	—	0	0	—
16	Earle Bruce^{†}	1989–1992	4	47	22	24	1	0.479	15	15	0	0.500	1	0	0	—	0	0	—
17	Sonny Lubick	1993–2007	15	182	108	74	0	0.593	80	40	0	0.667	3	6	0	1	6	0	—
18	Steve Fairchild	2008–2011	4	49	16	33	—	0.327	7	24	—	0.226	1	0	—	—	0	0	—
19	Jim McElwain	2012–2014	3	38	22	16	—	0.579	14	10	—	0.583	1	0	—	0	0	0	—
Int	Dave Baldwin (Note: Baldwin served as interim head coach for the 2014 Las Vegas Bowl after McElwain resigned as head coach to take the same position at Florida.)	2014	1	1	0	1	—	.000	0	0	—	–	0	1	—	0	0	0	—
20	Mike Bobo	2015–2019	5	63	28	35	—	0.444	20	20	—	0.500	0	3	—	0	0	0	—
21	Steve Addazio	2020–2021	2	16	4	12	—	0.250	3	9	—	0.250	0	0	—	0	0	0	—
22	Jay Norvell	2022–2025	4	44	18	26	—	0.409	13	13	—	0.500	0	1	—	0	0	0	—
Int	Tyson Summers (Note: Summers served as interim head coach for the final five games of the 2025 season after Jay Norvell was fired.)	2025	1	5	0	5	—	.000	0	5	—	.000	0	0	—	0	0	0	—
23	Jim L. Mora	2026–present	1	0	0	0	—	–	0	0	—	–	0	0	—	0	0	0	—
