= 1909 Colorado Silver and Gold football team =

American college football season

1909 Colorado Silver and Gold football

CFAC champion
- Conference: Colorado Faculty Athletic Conference
- Record: 6–0 (3–0 CFAC)
- Head coach: Fred Folsom (9th season)
- Captain: Elmer Stirrett
- Home stadium: Gamble Field

1909 Colorado Faculty Athletic Conference football standings
	Conf.					Overall
Team	W		L		T	W		L		T
Colorado $	3	–	0	–	0	6	–	0	–	0
Colorado College	2	–	1	–	0	5	–	2	–	0
Colorado Mines	0	–	2	–	0	3	–	3	–	0
Colorado Agricultural	0	–	2	–	0	1	–	2	–	0
$ – Conference champion

The 1909 Colorado Silver and Gold football team was an American football team that represented the University of Colorado as a member of the Colorado Faculty Athletic Conference (CFAC) during the 1909 college football season. In its ninth season under head coach Fred Folsom, the team compiled a perfect 6–0 record (3–0 against CFAC members), won the conference championship, was unscored upon for the season, and outscored opponents by a total of 141 to 0.

Colorado sustained a 21-game win streak that began on November 26, 1908, and ended on October 12, 1912. It remains the longest such streak in program history.

The 1909 season was the first for the CFAC; it was renamed as the Rocky Mountain Conference the following season.

== Schedule ==
Date	Time	Opponent	Site	Result	Attendance	Source
October 2		Boulder High School*	Gamble Field; Boulder, CO	W 3–0		
October 9		Colorado alumni*	Gamble Field; Boulder, CO	W 3–0		
October 23		Colorado Agricultural	Gamble Field; Boulder, CO (rivalry)	W 57–0		
November 6		New Mexico*	Gamble Field; Boulder, CO	W 53–0	1,500	
November 13	2:30 p.m.	at Colorado College	Washburn Field; Colorado Springs, CO	W 9–0		
November 25		at Colorado Mines	Golden, CO	W 16–0		
*Non-conference game
