= 1907 Colorado Silver and Gold football team =

American college football season

1907 Colorado Silver and Gold football
- Conference: Colorado Football Association
- Record: 5–3 (2–2 CFA)
- Head coach: Frank Castleman (2nd season)
- Captain: Nat Farnsworth
- Home stadium: Gamble Field

1907 Colorado Football Association standings
| | Conf. | | | | | Overall |
| Team | W | | L | | T | W | | L | | T |
|---|---|---|---|---|---|---|---|---|---|---|
| Colorado Mines $ | 4 | – | 0 | – | 0 | 5 | – | 1 | – | 0 |
| Colorado College | 3 | – | 1 | – | 0 | 5 | – | 2 | – | 0 |
| Colorado | 2 | – | 2 | – | 0 | 5 | – | 3 | – | 0 |
| Denver | 1 | – | 3 | – | 0 | 2 | – | 6 | – | 0 |
| Colorado Agricultural | 0 | – | 4 | – | 0 | 0 | – | 4 | – | 0 |
$ – Conference champion

The 1907 Colorado Silver and Gold football team was an American football team that represented the University of Colorado as a member of the Colorado Football Association (CGA) during the 1907 college football season. Led by Frank Castleman in his second and final season as head coach, Colorado compiled an overall record of 5–3 with a mark of 2–2 in conference play, placing third in the CFA.

== Schedule ==
| Date | Opponent | Site | Result | Source |
|---|---|---|---|---|
| October 1 | State Prep School* | Gamble Field; Boulder, CO | W 40–0 | |
| October 5 | Denver | Gamble Field; Boulder, CO | W 29–4 | |
| October 12 | Colorado alumni* | Gamble Field; Boulder, CO | W 5–0 | |
| October 19 | Colorado Agricultural | Gamble Field; Boulder, CO (rivalry) | W 17–13 | |
| October 26 | at Nebraska* | Antelope Field; Lincoln, NE (rivalry) | L 8–22 | |
| November 9 | at Colorado College | Washburn Field; Colorado Springs, CO | L 0–10 | |
| November 16 | Utah* | Gamble Field; Boulder, CO (rivalry) | W 24–10 | |
| November 28 | vs. Colorado Mines | Denver, CO | L 4–5 | |
*Non-conference game
