= 1904 Colorado Silver and Gold football team =

American college football season

1904 Colorado Silver and Gold football
- Conference: Colorado Football Association
- Record: 6–2–1 (3–1 CFA)
- Head coach: Dave Cropp (2nd season)
- Captain: Everett Owens
- Home stadium: Gamble Field

1904 Colorado Football Association standings
| | Conf. | | | | | Overall |
| Team | W | | L | | T | W | | L | | T |
|---|---|---|---|---|---|---|---|---|---|---|
| Colorado Mines $ | 3 | – | 0 | – | 1 | 3 | – | 0 | – | 1 |
| Colorado | 3 | – | 1 | – | 0 | 6 | – | 2 | – | 1 |
| Denver | 2 | – | 2 | – | 0 | 2 | – | 5 | – | 0 |
| Colorado College | 1 | – | 2 | – | 1 | 6 | – | 3 | – | 1 |
| Colorado Agricultural | 0 | – | 4 | – | 0 | 0 | – | 4 | – | 1 |
$ – Conference champion

The 1904 Colorado Silver and Gold football team was an American football team that represented the University of Colorado as a member of the Colorado Football Association (CFA) during the 1904 college football season. Led by Dave Cropp in his second and final season as head coach, Colorado compiled an overall record of 6–2–1 with a mark of 3–1 in conference play, placing second in the CFA.

== Schedule ==
| Date | Opponent | Site | Result | Source |
|---|---|---|---|---|
| September 24 | Colorado alumni* | Gamble Field; Boulder, CO | W 6–0 | |
| October 1 | at Utah* | Cummings Field; Salt Lake City, UT (rivalry) | W 33–6 | |
| October 8 | Nebraska* | Gamble Field; Boulder, CO (rivalry) | W 6–0 | |
| October 15 | at Kansas* | McCook Field; Lawrence, KS | T 6–6 | |
| October 22 | at Colorado Mines | Athletic Park; Golden, CO | L 10–13 | |
| October 29 | at Denver | Denver, CO | W 57–0 | |
| November 6 | at Colorado College | Washburn Field; Colorado Springs, CO | W 23–0 | |
| November 13 | Colorado Agricultural | Gamble Field; Boulder, CO (rivalry) | W 46–0 | |
| November 24 | vs. Stanford | Broadway Park; Denver, CO | L 0–33 | |
*Non-conference game
