= 1906 Colorado Silver and Gold football team =

American college football season

1906 Colorado Silver and Gold football
- Conference: Colorado Football Association
- Record: 2–3–4 (1–1–2 CFA)
- Head coach: Frank Castleman (1st season)
- Captain: John Salberg
- Home stadium: Gamble Field

1906 Colorado Football Association standings
	Conf.					Overall
Team	W		L		T	W		L		T
Colorado Mines $	2	–	0	–	2	2	–	0	–	2
Colorado	1	–	1	–	2	2	–	3	–	4
Denver	2	–	2	–	0	2	–	3	–	0
Colorado College	1	–	2	–	1	3	–	2	–	2
Colorado Agricultural	1	–	2	–	1	1	–	2	–	1
$ – Conference champion

The 1906 Colorado Silver and Gold football team was an American football team that represented the University of Colorado during the 1906 college football season. The team returned to the Colorado Football Association (CFL) after a season as an independent. Led by first-year head coach Frank Castleman, Colorado compiled an overall record of 2–3–4 with a mark of 1–1–2 in conference play, tying for second place in the CFA.

== Schedule ==
Date	Opponent	Site	Result	Source
September 29	State Prep School*	Gamble Field; Boulder, CO	W 22–0	
October 6	Colorado alumni*	Gamble Field; Boulder, CO	T 0–0	
October 13	Denver	Gamble Field; Boulder, CO	W 6–0	
October 20	at Washburn*	Topeka, KS	T 0–0	
October 27	at Kansas*	McCook Field; Lawrence, KS	L 0–16	
November 3	Colorado College	Gamble Field; Boulder, CO	L 0–6	
November 10	at Colorado Agricultural	Durkee Field (rivalry)	T 0–0	
November 17	at Utah*	Cummings Field; Salt Lake City, UT (rivalry)	L 0–10	
November 22	Colorado Mines	Gamble Field; Boulder, CO	T 0–0	
*Non-conference game
