= 1909 Colorado Agricultural Aggies football team =

American college football season

1909 Colorado Agricultural Aggies football
- Conference: Colorado Faculty Athletic Conference
- Record: 1–2 (0–2 CFAC)
- Head coach: Claude Rothgeb (4th season)
- Home stadium: Durkee Field

1909 Colorado Faculty Athletic Conference football standings
| | Conf. | | | | | Overall |
| Team | W | | L | | T | W | | L | | T |
|---|---|---|---|---|---|---|---|---|---|---|
| Colorado $ | 3 | – | 0 | – | 0 | 6 | – | 0 | – | 0 |
| Colorado College | 2 | – | 1 | – | 0 | 5 | – | 2 | – | 0 |
| Colorado Mines | 0 | – | 2 | – | 0 | 3 | – | 3 | – | 0 |
| Colorado Agricultural | 0 | – | 2 | – | 0 | 1 | – | 2 | – | 0 |
$ – Conference champion

The 1909 Colorado Agricultural Aggies football team represented Colorado Agricultural College (now known as Colorado State University) in the Colorado Faculty Athletic Conference (CFAC) during the 1909 college football season. In their fourth and final season under head coach Claude Rothgeb, the Aggies compiled a 1–2 record (0–2 against CFAC opponents) and were outscored by a total of 91 to 38.

== Schedule ==
| Date | Opponent | Site | Result | Source |
|---|---|---|---|---|
| October 16 | Wyoming | Durkee Field; Fort Collins, CO (rivalry) | W 32–3 | |
| October 23 | at Colorado | Gamble Field; Boulder, CO (rivalry) | L 0–57 | |
| November 6 | at Colorado College | Washburn Field; Colorado Springs, CO | L 6–31 | |
