= 1901 Colorado Agricultural Aggies football team =

American college football season

1901 Colorado Agricultural Aggies football
- Conference: Colorado Football Association
- Record: 1–2 (1–2 CFA)
- Head coach: C. J. Griffith (1st season)
- Home stadium: Durkee Field

1901 Colorado Football Association standings
	Conf.					Overall
Team	W		L		T	W		L		T
Colorado $	2	–	0	–	0	5	–	1	–	1
Colorado College	2	–	1	–	0	5	–	1	–	0
Colorado Mines	1	–	2	–	0	1	–	4	–	0
Colorado Agricultural	0	–	2	–	0	1	–	2	–	0
$ – Conference champion; Colorado vs. Colorado Agricultural game not played due to alleged amateurism violation

The 1901 Colorado Agricultural Aggies football team represented Colorado Agricultural College (now known as Colorado State University) in the Colorado Football Association (CFA) during the 1901 college football season. In their first season under head coach C. J. Griffith, the Aggies compiled a 1–2 record and outscored opponents by a total of 56 to 32.

The Aggies opened their season under head coach George Toomey and played a game on October 12 against Colorado. When the Aggies placed an ineligible player into the game, Colorado's coach Fred Folsom protested and refused to proceed. However, Colorado failed to follow procedures, and the Intercollegiate Athletic Association of Colorado awarded the game to the Aggies as a forfeit. Toomey resigned following the game and was replaced as head coach by C.J. Griffith. Despite being awarded the forfeit, Colorado State does not count the game as a win in its media guide.

== Schedule ==
Date	Opponent	Site	Result	Source
October 12	Colorado	Durkee Field; Fort Collins, CO (rivalry)	W 1–0 (forfeit)	
October 19	Denver	Durkee Field; Fort Collins, CO	W 56–5	
October 26	at Colorado College	Washburn Field; Colorado Springs, CO	L 0–16	
November 5	Colorado Mines	Durkee Field; Fort Collins, CO	L 0–11	
