= 1902 Colorado Silver and Gold football team =

American college football season

1902 Colorado Silver and Gold football

CFA champion
- Conference: Colorado Football Association
- Record: 5–1 (4–0 CFA)
- Head coach: Fred Folsom (7th season)
- Captain: Al Tonkin
- Home stadium: Gamble Field

1902 Colorado Football Association standings
	Conf.					Overall
Team	W		L		T	W		L		T
Colorado $	4	–	0	–	0	5	–	1	–	0
Colorado Mines	2	–	1	–	1	4	–	1	–	2
Colorado College	2	–	2	–	0	3	–	4	–	0
Denver	1	–	3	–	0	3	–	4	–	1
Colorado Agricultural	0	–	3	–	1	1	–	3	–	2
$ – Conference champion

The 1902 Colorado Silver and Gold football team was an American football team that represented the University of Colorado as a member of the Colorado Football Association (CFA) during the 1902 college football season. Led by seventh-year head coach Fred Folsom, Colorado compiled an overall record of 5–1 with a mark of 4–0 in conference play, winning the CFA title for the second consecutive season.

== Schedule ==
Date	Opponent	Site	Result
September 27	State Prep School*	Gamble Field; Boulder, CO	W 12–0
October 4	at Nebraska*	Antelope Field; Lincoln, NE (rivalry)	L 0–10
October 11	Denver	Gamble Field; Boulder, CO	W 24–0
October 18	at Colorado Agricultural	Durkee Field; Fort Collins, CO (rivalry)	W 11–6
October 25	Colorado College	Gamble Field; Boulder, CO	W 12–6
November 3	Colorado Mines	Gamble Field; Boulder, CO	W 28–0
*Non-conference game
