= 1908 Colorado Silver and Gold football team =

American college football season

1908 Colorado Silver and Gold football
- Conference: Colorado Football Association
- Record: 5–2 (3–1 CFA)
- Head coach: Fred Folsom (8th season)
- Captain: Claire Coffin
- Home stadium: Gamble Field

1908 Colorado Football Association standings
	Conf.					Overall
Team	W		L		T	W		L		T
Denver $	4	–	0	–	0	7	–	1	–	0
Colorado	3	–	1	–	0	5	–	2	–	0
Colorado College	2	–	1	–	0	6	–	1	–	0
Colorado Agricultural	0	–	2	–	0	1	–	3	–	0
Colorado Mines	0	–	3	–	0	2	–	3	–	0
$ – Conference champion

The 1908 Colorado Silver and Gold football team was an American football team that represented the University of Colorado as a member of the Colorado Football Association (CFA) during the 1908 college football season. Fred Folsom, who had left Colorado to coach at Dartmouth College from 1903 to 1907, returned as the team's head coach for his third stint and eighth overall season. Under Folsom's guidance, the team compiled an overall record of 5–2 record with a mark of 3–1 in conference playing, placing second in the CFA. Colorado outscored its opponents by a total of 96 to 35.

== Schedule ==
Date	Opponent	Site	Result	Source
October 4	at Longmont High School*	Longmont, CO	W 6–0	
October 11	at Boulder High School*	Boulder, CO	W 29–0	
October 24	at Colorado Agricultural	Fort Collins, CO (rivalry)	W 8–0	
November 3	Colorado College	Gamble Field; Boulder, CO	W 14–0	
November 14	at Utah*	Cummings Field; Salt Lake City, UT (rivalry)	L 14–21	
November 21	Denver	Gamble Field; Boulder, CO	L 10–14	
November 26	Colorado Mines	Gamble Field; Boulder, CO	W 15–0	
*Non-conference game
