= 1906 Colorado Agricultural Aggies football team =

American college football season

1906 Colorado Agricultural Aggies football
- Conference: Colorado Football Association
- Record: 1–2–1 (1–2–1 CFA)
- Head coach: Claude Rothgeb (1st season)
- Home stadium: Durkee Field

1906 Colorado Football Association standings
	Conf.					Overall
Team	W		L		T	W		L		T
Colorado Mines $	2	–	0	–	2	2	–	0	–	2
Colorado	1	–	1	–	2	2	–	3	–	4
Denver	2	–	2	–	0	2	–	3	–	0
Colorado College	1	–	2	–	1	3	–	2	–	2
Colorado Agricultural	1	–	2	–	1	1	–	2	–	1
$ – Conference champion

The 1906 Colorado Agricultural Aggies football team represented Colorado Agricultural College (now known as Colorado State University) in the Colorado Football Association (CFA) during the 1906 college football season. In their first season under head coach Claude Rothgeb, the Aggies compiled a 1–2–1 record, tied for last place in the CFA, and were outscored by a total of 21 to 4.

== Schedule ==
Date	Opponent	Site	Result	Source
October 20	at Colorado Mines	Athletic Park; Golden, CO	L 0–11	
October 27	at Colorado College	Washburn Field; Colorado Springs, CO	W 4–0	
November 10	Colorado	Durkee Field; Fort Collins, CO (rivalry)	T 0–0	
November 17	at Denver	Denver, CO	L 0–10	
