= 1907 Colorado Agricultural Aggies football team =

American college football season

1907 Colorado Agricultural Aggies football
- Conference: Colorado Football Association
- Record: 0–4 (0–4 CFA)
- Head coach: Claude Rothgeb (2nd season)
- Home stadium: Durkee Field

1907 Colorado Football Association standings
	Conf.					Overall
Team	W		L		T	W		L		T
Colorado Mines $	4	–	0	–	0	5	–	1	–	0
Colorado College	3	–	1	–	0	5	–	2	–	0
Colorado	2	–	2	–	0	5	–	3	–	0
Denver	1	–	3	–	0	2	–	6	–	0
Colorado Agricultural	0	–	4	–	0	0	–	4	–	0
$ – Conference champion

The 1907 Colorado Agricultural Aggies football team represented Colorado Agricultural College (now known as Colorado State University) in the Colorado Football Association (CFA) during the 1907 college football season. In their second season under head coach Claude Rothgeb, the Aggies compiled a 0–4 record, finished last in the CFA, and were outscored by a total of 77 to 17.

== Schedule ==
Date	Opponent	Site	Result	Source
October 12	Colorado College	Durkee Field; Fort Collins, CO	L 4–20	
October 19	at Colorado	Gamble Field; Boulder, CO (rivalry)	L 13–17	
November 2	Colorado Mines	Durkee Field; Fort Collins, CO	L 0–35	
November 23	Denver	Durkee Field; Fort Collins, CO	L 0–5	
