= 1902 Colorado Agricultural Aggies football team =

American college football season

1902 Colorado Agricultural Aggies football
- Conference: Colorado Football Association
- Record: 1–3–2 (0–3–1 CFA)
- Head coach: C. J. Griffith (2nd season)
- Home stadium: Durkee Field

1902 Colorado Football Association standings
	Conf.					Overall
Team	W		L		T	W		L		T
Colorado $	4	–	0	–	0	5	–	1	–	0
Colorado Mines	2	–	1	–	1	4	–	1	–	2
Colorado College	2	–	2	–	0	3	–	4	–	0
Denver	1	–	3	–	0	3	–	4	–	1
Colorado Agricultural	0	–	3	–	1	1	–	3	–	2
$ – Conference champion

The 1902 Colorado Agricultural Aggies football team represented Colorado Agricultural College (now known as Colorado State University) in the Colorado Football Association (CFA) during the 1902 college football season. In their second and final season under head coach C. J. Griffith, the Aggies compiled a 1–3–2 record (0–3–1 against CFA opponents) and were outscored by a total of 62 to 47.

== Schedule ==
Date	Time	Opponent	Site	Result	Attendance	Source
October 18		at Colorado	Gamble Field; Boulder, CO (rivalry)	L 6–11		
October 25	3:30 p.m.	at Utah*	University grounds; Salt Lake City, UT	T 0–0	3,000	
October 27		at Utah Agricultural*	Logan, UT	W 24–5	600–800	
November 4	3:00 p.m.	Colorado College	Durkee Field; Fort Collins, CO	L 6–29		
November 15		at Colorado Mines	Golden, CO	T 6–6		
November 22		Denver	Durkee Field; Fort Collins, CO	L 5–11		
*Non-conference game; All times are in Mountain time
