= 1904 Colorado Agricultural Aggies football team =

American college football season

1904 Colorado Agricultural Aggies football
- Conference: Colorado Football Association
- Record: 0–4–1 (0–4 CFA)
- Head coach: John H. McIntosh (1st season)
- Home stadium: Durkee Field

1904 Colorado Football Association standings
	Conf.					Overall
Team	W		L		T	W		L		T
Colorado Mines $	3	–	0	–	1	3	–	0	–	1
Colorado	3	–	1	–	0	6	–	2	–	1
Denver	2	–	2	–	0	2	–	5	–	0
Colorado College	1	–	2	–	1	6	–	3	–	1
Colorado Agricultural	0	–	4	–	0	0	–	4	–	1
$ – Conference champion

The 1904 Colorado Agricultural Aggies football team represented Colorado Agricultural College (now known as Colorado State University) in the Colorado Football Association (CFA) during the 1904 college football season. In their first season under head coach John H. McIntosh, the Aggies compiled a 0–4–1 record, finished last in the CFA, and were outscored by a total of 125 to 6.

== Schedule ==
Date	Opponent	Site	Result	Source
October 22	Denver	Durkee Field; Fort Collins, CO	L 0–18	
October 29	at Colorado Mines	Golden, CO	L 0–51	
November 3	Colorado College	Durkee Field; Fort Collins CO	L 0–4	
November 19	at Colorado	Gamble Field; Boulder, CO (rivalry)	L 0–46	
November 24	at Wyoming*	Laramie, WY (rivalry)	T 6–6	
*Non-conference game
