= 1900 Colorado Silver and Gold football team =

American college football season

1900 Colorado Silver and Gold football
- Conference: Colorado Football Association
- Record: 6–4 (1–2 CFA)
- Head coach: Theron W. Mortimer (1st season)
- Captain: Wilson Turman

1900 Colorado Football Association standings
	Conf.					Overall
Team	W		L		T	W		L		T
Colorado College $	3	–	0	–	0	6	–	2	–	0
Colorado Mines	2	–	1	–	0	4	–	3	–	0
Colorado	1	–	2	–	0	6	–	4	–	0
Colorado Agricultural	0	–	3	–	0	1	–	3	–	0
$ – Conference champion

The 1900 Colorado Silver and Gold football team was an American football team that represented the University of Colorado as a member of the Colorado Football Association (CFA) during the 1900 college football season. Led by Theron W. Mortimer in his first and only season as head coach, Colorado compiled an overall record of 6–4 with a mark of 1–2 in conference play, placing third in the CFA. Mortimer replaced Fred Folsom, who had been head coach from 1895 to 1899 and returned to helm the team in 1901.

== Schedule ==
Date	Opponent	Site	Result	Source
September 18	at Manual High School*	Denver, CO	W 29–0	
September 25	at West High School*	Denver, CO	W 18–0	
October 1	State Prep School*	Boulder, CO	W 25–3	
October 8	at Colorado State Normal	Greeley, CO	W 41–0	
October 15	Colorado Agricultural	Boulder, CO (rivalry)	W 29–0	
October 22	at Denver Wheel Club*	Denver, CO	L 0–11	
October 29	Colorado Mines	Boulder, CO	L 0–11	
November 5	Wyoming*	Boulder, CO	W 10–6	
November 12	at Colorado College	Colorado Springs, CO	L 0–21	
November 22	Denver Athletic Club*	Boulder, CO	L 0–24	
*Non-conference game
