= 1908 Denver Ministers football team =

American college football season

1908 Denver Ministers football

CFA champion
- Conference: Colorado Football Association
- Record: 7–1 (4–0 CFA)
- Head coach: John P. Koehler (3rd season)

1908 Colorado Football Association standings
	Conf.					Overall
Team	W		L		T	W		L		T
Denver $	4	–	0	–	0	7	–	1	–	0
Colorado	3	–	1	–	0	5	–	2	–	0
Colorado College	2	–	1	–	0	6	–	1	–	0
Colorado Agricultural	0	–	2	–	0	1	–	3	–	0
Colorado Mines	0	–	3	–	0	2	–	3	–	0
$ – Conference champion

The 1908 Denver Ministers football team represented the University of Denver as a member of the Colorado Football Association (CFA) during the 1908 college football season. In their third season under head coach John P. Koehler, the Ministers compiled a 7–1 record (3–0 in conference play), won the CFA championship, and outscored opponents by a total of 153 to 37. The team's only loss was by an 8–4 score in the final game of the season against Pop Warner's Carlisle Indians.

== Schedule ==
Date	Time	Opponent	Site	Result	Source
October 3		Manual High School*	Denver, CO	W 47–0	
October 10		Utah*	Denver, CO	W 17–15	
October 17		Colorado Agricultural	Denver, CO	W 17–0	
October 31		Creighton*	Denver, CO	W 30–0	
November 7		Colorado Mines	Denver, CO	W 18–0	
November 21		at Colorado	Gamble Field; Boulder, CO	W 14–10	
November 26		at Colorado College	Colorado Springs, CO	W 6–4	
December 5	2:39 p.m.	Carlisle*	Denver, CO	L 4–8	
*Non-conference game
