= 1901 Colorado Silver and Gold football team =

American college football season

1901 Colorado Silver and Gold football

CFA champion
- Conference: Colorado Football Association
- Record: 5–1–1 (2–0 CFA)
- Head coach: Fred Folsom (6th season)
- Captain: George Carlson
- Home stadium: Gamble Field

1901 Colorado Football Association standings
	Conf.					Overall
Team	W		L		T	W		L		T
Colorado $	2	–	0	–	0	5	–	1	–	1
Colorado College	2	–	1	–	0	5	–	1	–	0
Colorado Mines	1	–	2	–	0	1	–	4	–	0
Colorado Agricultural	0	–	2	–	0	1	–	2	–	0
$ – Conference champion; Colorado vs. Colorado Agricultural game not played due to alleged amateurism violation

The 1901 Colorado Silver and Gold football team was an American football team that represented the University of Colorado as a member of the Colorado Football Association (CFA) during the 1901 college football season. Fred Folsom returned from a one-year absence for his sixth season as head coach and led Colorado to an overall record of 5–1–1 with a mark of 2–0 in conference play, winning the CFA championship.

== Schedule ==
Date	Opponent	Site	Result
September 17	State Prep School*	Boulder, CO	W 5–0
September 24	Colorado alumni*	Boulder, CO	W 6–0
September 30	at State Prep School*		T 0–0
October 8	Denver Wheel Club*	Boulder, CO	W 11–0
October 15	at Colorado College	Washburn Field; Colorado Springs, CO	W 11–2
October 22	Colorado Mines	Boulder, CO	W 23–0
November 28	at Denver Athletic Club	Denver, CO	L 0–29
*Non-conference game
