= 1900 Colorado Agricultural Aggies football team =

American college football season

1900 Colorado Agricultural Aggies football
- Conference: Colorado Football Association
- Record: 1–3 (0–3 CFA)
- Head coach: George Toomey (1st season)
- Home stadium: Durkee Field

1900 Colorado Football Association standings
	Conf.					Overall
Team	W		L		T	W		L		T
Colorado College $	3	–	0	–	0	6	–	2	–	0
Colorado Mines	2	–	1	–	0	4	–	3	–	0
Colorado	1	–	2	–	0	6	–	4	–	0
Colorado Agricultural	0	–	3	–	0	1	–	3	–	0
$ – Conference champion

The 1900 Colorado Agricultural Aggies football team represented Colorado Agricultural College (now known as Colorado State University) in the Colorado Football Association (CFA) during the 1900 college football season. In his first season as head coach following the death of previous head coach W. J. Forbes, George Toomey posted a 1–3 record, outscored by a total of 109 to 16.

== Schedule ==
Date	Opponent	Site	Result	Source
October 6	at Colorado State Normal	Greeley, CO	L (forfeit)	
October 13	at Colorado College	Washburn Field; Colorado Springs, CO	L 0–53	
October 15	at Colorado	Boulder, CO (rivalry)	L 0–29	
October 27	at Colorado Mines	Golden, CO	L 0–27	
November 24	Wyoming	Fort Collins, CO (rivalry)	W 16–0	
