= 1907 Denver Ministers football team =

American college football season

1907 Denver Ministers football
- Conference: Colorado Football Association
- Record: 2–6 (1–3 CFA)
- Head coach: John P. Koehler (2nd season)

1907 Colorado Football Association standings
	Conf.					Overall
Team	W		L		T	W		L		T
Colorado Mines $	4	–	0	–	0	5	–	1	–	0
Colorado College	3	–	1	–	0	5	–	2	–	0
Colorado	2	–	2	–	0	5	–	3	–	0
Denver	1	–	3	–	0	2	–	6	–	0
Colorado Agricultural	0	–	4	–	0	0	–	4	–	0
$ – Conference champion

The 1907 Denver Ministers football team represented the University of Denver as a member of the Colorado Football Association (CFA) during the 1907 college football season. In their second season under head coach John P. Koehler, the Ministers compiled an overall record of 2–6 with a mark of 1–3 in conference play, placing fourth in the CFA.

== Schedule ==
Date	Time	Opponent	Site	Result	Attendance	Source
September 28		Manual High School*	Denver, CO	W 13–0		
October 5		at Colorado	Gamble Field; Boulder, CO	L 4–29		
October 12	3:15 p.m.	at Utah*	Cummings Field; Salt Lake City, UT	L 4–24		
October 19	2:30 p.m.	at St. Vincent's (CA)*	Fiesta Park; Los Angeles, CA	L 0–10	3,000	
October 26		Colorado College	Denver, CO	L 4–20		
November 9		at Colorado Mines	Golden, CO	L 0–33		
November 16	2:45 p.m.	at Nebraska*	Antelope Field; Lincoln, NE	L 0–63		
November 23		at Colorado Agricultural	Fort Collins, CO	W 5–0		
*Non-conference game
