= 1893 Colorado Agricultural football team =

American college football season

1893 Colorado Agricultural football
- Conference: Colorado Football Association
- Record: 1–3 (1–3 CFA)
- Head coach: None
- Home stadium: Campus fields

1893 Colorado Football Association standings
| | Conf. | | | | | Overall |
| Team | W | | L | | T | W | | L | | T |
|---|---|---|---|---|---|---|---|---|---|---|
| Colorado Mines $ | 3 | – | 0 | – | 0 | 4 | – | 1 | – | 0 |
| Colorado | 1 | – | 1 | – | 0 | 2 | – | 3 | – | 0 |
| Colorado Agricultural | 1 | – | 3 | – | 0 | 1 | – | 3 | – | 0 |
| Denver | 0 | – | 2 | – | 0 | 1 | – | 2 | – | 0 |
$ – Conference champion

The 1893 Colorado Agricultural football team represented Colorado Agricultural College (now known as Colorado State University) in the Colorado Football Association (CFA) during the 1893 college football season. The 1893 season was the school's first fall football season after the team's inaugural season in the spring of 1893.

The team, then known as the CACs, compiled a 1–3 record and was outscored by a total of 214 to 126. The team had no coach.

== Schedule ==
| Date | Opponent | Site | Result | Source |
|---|---|---|---|---|
| October 7 | at Colorado | Boulder, CO (rivalry) | L 6–44 | |
| October 14 | at Colorado Mines | Golden, CO | L 6–12 | |
| October 21 | Denver | Denver, CO | W 60–10 | |
| October 28 | at Colorado Mines | Golden, CO | L 0–50 | |
