= SS John H. McIntosh =

Liberty ship of WWII

History

United States
- Name: John H. McIntosh
- Namesake: John H. McIntosh
- Owner: War Shipping Administration (WSA)
- Operator: Stockard Steamship Corp.
- Ordered: as type (EC2-S-C1) hull, MC hull 2496
- Awarded: 23 April 1943
- Builder: St. Johns River Shipbuilding Company, Jacksonville, Florida
- Cost: $1,019,254
- Yard number: 60
- Way number: 6
- Laid down: 16 August 1944
- Launched: 23 September 1944
- Sponsored by: Mrs. D.M. Barnett
- Completed: 30 September 1944
- Identification: Call sign: KSZB
- Fate: Laid up in the, National Defense Reserve Fleet, Wilmington, North Carolina, 2 June 1948; Laid up in the, Hudson River Reserve Fleet, Jones Point, New York, 18 April 1952; Sold for scrapping, 8 September 1970, removed from fleet, 16 September 1970

General characteristics
- Class & type: Liberty ship; type EC2-S-C1, standard
- Tonnage: 10,865 LT DWT; 7,176 GRT
- Displacement: 3,380 long tons (3,434 t) (light); 14,245 long tons (14,474 t) (max)
- Length: 441 feet 6 inches (135 m) oa; 416 feet (127 m) pp; 427 feet (130 m) lwl
- Beam: 57 feet (17 m)
- Draft: 27 ft 9.25 in (8.4646 m)
- Installed power: 2 × Oil fired 450 °F (232 °C) boilers, operating at 220 psi (1,500 kPa); 2,500 hp (1,900 kW)
- Propulsion: 1 × triple-expansion steam engine, (manufactured by General Machinery Corp., Hamilton, Ohio); 1 × screw propeller
- Speed: 11.5 knots (21.3 km/h; 13.2 mph)
- Capacity: 562,608 cubic feet (15,931 m^{3}) (grain); 499,573 cubic feet (14,146 m^{3}) (bale)
- Complement: 38–62 USMM; 21–40 USNAG
- Armament: Varied by ship; Bow-mounted 3-inch (76 mm)/50-caliber gun; Stern-mounted 4-inch (102 mm)/50-caliber gun; 2–8 × single 20-millimeter (0.79 in) Oerlikon anti-aircraft (AA) cannons and/or, 2–8 × 37-millimeter (1.46 in) M1 AA guns

SS John H. McIntosh was a Liberty ship built in the United States during World War II. She was named after John H. McIntosh, an American college football player and coach, as well as an attorney and newspaper editor. He was the head coach of the Colorado State (1904–1905) and Montana State (1908–1910) football programs.

== Construction ==
John H. McIntosh was laid down on 16 August 1944, under a Maritime Commission (MARCOM) contract, MC hull 2496, by the St. Johns River Shipbuilding Company, Jacksonville, Florida; she was sponsored by Mrs. D.M. Barnett, the wife of the executive vice president of Barnett National Bank, Jacksonville, and was launched on 23 September 1944.

== History ==
She was allocated to the Stockard Steamship Corp., on 30 September 1944. On 2 June 1948, she was laid up in the National Defense Reserve Fleet, Wilmington, North Carolina. On 18 April 1952, she was laid up in the Hudson River Reserve Fleet, Jones Point, New York. On 13 July 1953, she was withdrawn from the fleet to be loaded with grain under the "Grain Program 1953", she returned loaded on 22 July 1953. On 27 June 1956, she was withdrawn to be unload, she returned refilled under the "Grain Program 1956" on 13 July 1956. On 9 July 1963, she was withdrawn from the fleet to be unloaded, she returned empty on 15 July 1963. She was sold for scrapping, 8 September 1970, to Eckhardt & Co., Gmbh., for $90,500. She was removed from the fleet on 16 September 1970.

== Bibliography ==
- "St. John's River Shipbuilding, Jacksonville FL". www.ShipbuildingHistory.com. 16 October 2010.
- Maritime Administration. "John H. McIntosh". Ship History Database Vessel Status Card. U.S. Department of Transportation, Maritime Administration.
- Davies, James (May 2004). "Specifications (As-Built)" (PDF). p. 23.
- "SS John H. McIntosh".
