= 1893 Colorado Silver and Gold football team =

American college football season

1893 Colorado Silver and Gold football
- Conference: Colorado Football Association
- Record: 2–3 (1–1 CFA)
- Head coach: None
- Captain: Pat Carney
- Home stadium: Campus fields

1893 Colorado Football Association standings
	Conf.					Overall
Team	W		L		T	W		L		T
Colorado Mines $	3	–	0	–	0	4	–	1	–	0
Colorado	1	–	1	–	0	2	–	3	–	0
Colorado Agricultural	1	–	3	–	0	1	–	3	–	0
Denver	0	–	2	–	0	1	–	2	–	0
$ – Conference champion

The 1893 Colorado Silver and Gold football team was an American football team that represented the University of Colorado as a member of the Colorado Football Association (CFA) during the 1893 college football season. The season marked the program's first conference affiliation and was the last season without a head coach. Colorado compiled an overall record of 2–3 with a mark of 1–1 in conference play, placing second in the CFA.

== Schedule ==
Date	Opponent	Site	Result
September 30	at Denver Athletic Club*	Denver, CO	L 0–14
October 7	Colorado Agricultural	Boulder, CO (rivalry)	W 44–6
November 7	at Colorado Mines	Golden, CO	L 10–24
November 14	Highland School*	Boulder, CO	W 4–0
November 18	at Denver Athletic Club*	Denver, CO	L 4–32
*Non-conference game
