= John R. Richards =

American college football player and coach, educator, and public administrator

Biographical details
- Born: February 24, 1875; Wisconsin, U.S.
- Died: October 28, 1947 (aged 72); Los Angeles, California, U.S.

Playing career
- 1892–1896: Wisconsin
- Position: Fullback

Coaching career (HC unless noted)
- 1897: Shurtleff
- 1905–1909: Colorado College
- 1911: Wisconsin
- 1912: Ohio State
- 1917: Wisconsin
- 1919–1922: Wisconsin

Accomplishments and honors

Championships
- 1 OAC (1912)

John Robertson "Big John" Richards (February 24, 1875 – October 28, 1947) was an American college football player and coach, educator, and public administrator. He served as the head football coach at Shurtleff College (1897), Colorado College (1905–1909), the University of Wisconsin–Madison (1911, 1917, 1919–1922), and Ohio State University (1912).

Richards' 1912 season at Ohio State was notable for his action of pulling his team from the field during a loss to Penn State due to rough play. This action was widely ridiculed in contemporary newspapers by commentary such as "Coach Richards of Ohio State, who took his team off the field Saturday because he declared Penn State was too rough, evidently was never on Lake Erie on a choppy sea."

In 1904, Richards was appointed as the principal of a high school in Colorado Springs, Colorado. Previously, he had been a high school football coach and economics instructor in Dubuque, Iowa, and a principal of military academies in Minnesota and Missouri. After retiring from coaching, Richards was a director of the Los Angeles Metropolitan Water District, a part of the Metropolitan Water District of Southern California, from 1929 to 1947. From October 2, 1939, to September 10, 1940, he was the California Director of Finance. He died on October 28, 1947, in Los Angeles, at the age of 72.

== Head coaching record ==
| Year | Team | Overall | Conference | Standing | Bowl/playoffs |
|---|---|---|---|---|---|
Colorado College Tigers (Colorado Football Association) (1905–1908)
| 1905 | Colorado College | 5–1–2 | | | |
| 1906 | Colorado College | 3–2–2 | 1–2–1 | T–4th | |
| 1907 | Colorado College | 5–2 | 3–1 | 2nd | |
| 1908 | Colorado College | 5–2 | 2–1 | 3rd | |
Colorado College Tigers (Colorado Faculty Athletic Conference) (1909)
| 1909 | Colorado College | 5–2 | 2–1 | 2nd | |
| Colorado College: | | 23–9–4 | | | |
Wisconsin Badgers (Western Conference) (1911)
| 1911 | Wisconsin | 5–1–1 | 2–1–1 | 3rd | |
Ohio State Buckeyes (Ohio Athletic Conference) (1912)
| 1912 | Ohio State | 6–3 | 5–0 | 1st | |
| Ohio State: | | 6–3 | 5–0 | | |
Wisconsin Badgers (Big Ten Conference) (1917)
| 1917 | Wisconsin | 4–2–1 | 3–2 | T–3rd | |
Wisconsin Badgers (Big Ten Conference) (1919–1922)
| 1919 | Wisconsin | 5–2 | 3–2 | T–4th | |
| 1920 | Wisconsin | 6–1 | 4–1 | 2nd | |
| 1921 | Wisconsin | 5–1–1 | 3–1–1 | 4th | |
| 1922 | Wisconsin | 4–2–1 | 2–2–1 | 4th | |
| Wisconsin: | | 29–9–4 | 14–7–3 | | |
| Total: | | 58–21–8 | | | |
