= J. C. Ewing =

American football and baseball coach (1875–1965)

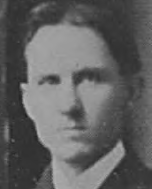

Biographical details
- Born: June 1, 1875; Gibson City, Illinois, U.S.
- Died: April 5, 1965 (aged 89); San Diego, California, U.S.

Playing career

Football
- 1898: Chicago

Coaching career (HC unless noted)

Football
- 1900–1901: Colorado College
- 1902: Baylor

Baseball
- 1902: Baylor

Head coaching record
- Overall: 10–9–2 (football); 5–9 (baseball)

Accomplishments and honors

Championships
- Football; 1 CFA (1900)

Joseph Chalmers Ewing (June 1, 1875 – April 5, 1965) was an American college football and college baseball coach. He served as the head football coach at Colorado College from 1900 to 1901 and Baylor University in 1902, compiling a career college football head coaching record of 2–4–2. Ewing was also the first head baseball coach at Baylor, coaching the 1902 season and tallying a mark of 5–9.

Ewing married Louise Woodward Currier on October 29, 1903, in Greeley, Colorado. He later worked as a lawyer in Greeley.

== Head coaching record ==
=== Football ===
Year	Team	Overall	Conference	Standing	Bowl/playoffs
Colorado College Tigers (Colorado Football Association) (1900–1901)
1900	Colorado College	5–1	2–1	2nd	
1901	Colorado College	3–4	2–2	3rd	
Colorado College:		8–5	4–3		
Baylor (Independent) (1902)
1902	Baylor	2–4–2			
Baylor:		2–4–2			
Total:		10–9–2			
