= Canvas Stadium =

College football stadium in Colorado, US

Sonny Lubick Field at Canvas Stadium
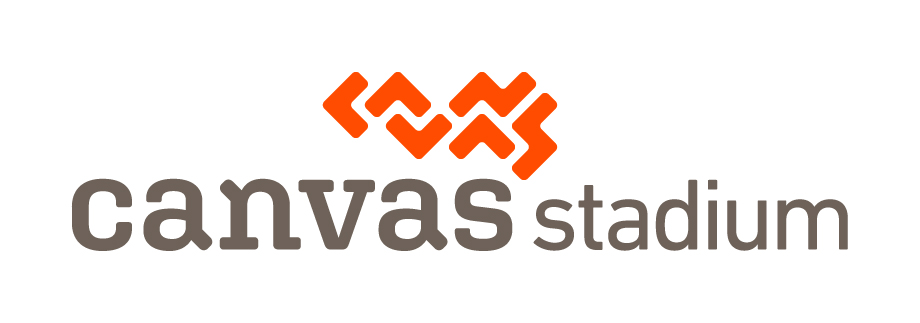

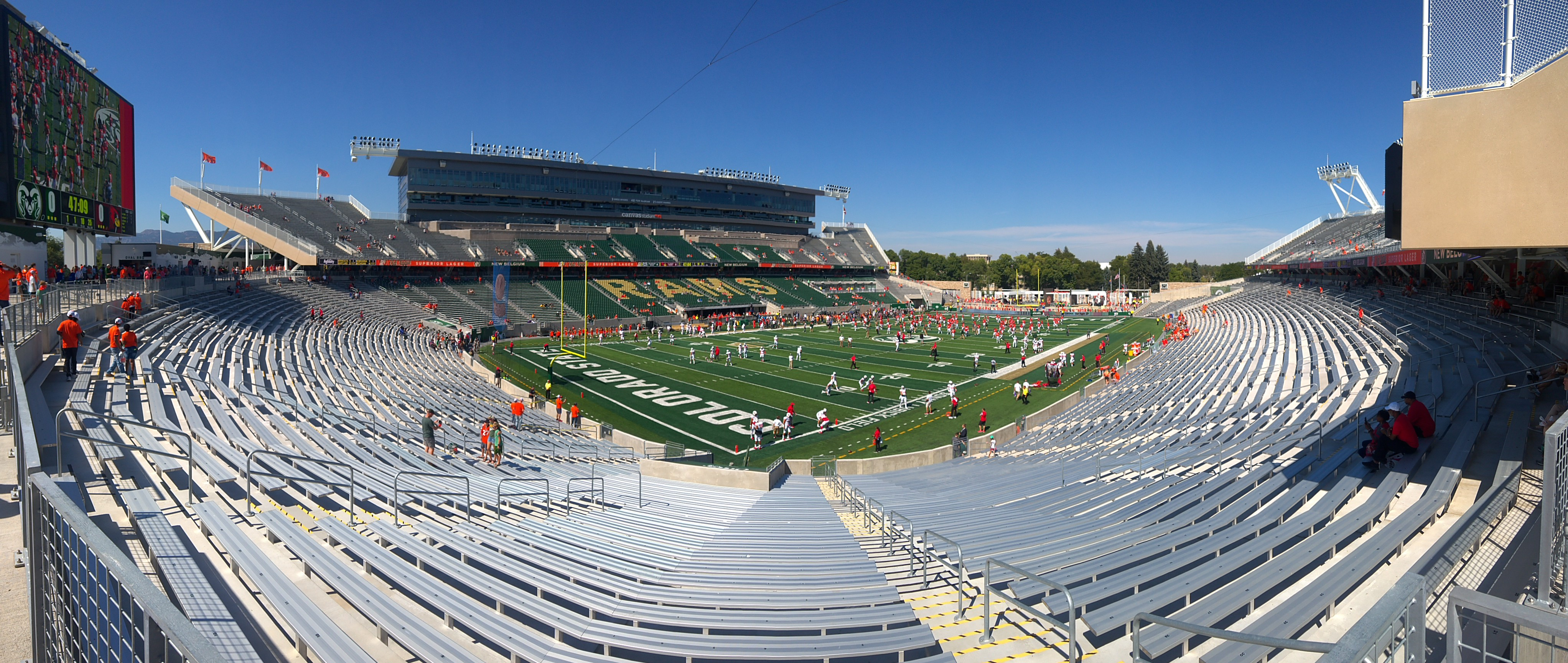

- Location in the United States Location in Colorado
- Interactive map of Sonny Lubick Field at Canvas Stadium
- Full name: Sonny Lubick Field at Canvas Stadium
- Former names: Sonny Lubick Field at Colorado State Stadium (2017)
- Address: 751 West Pitkin Street
- Location: Colorado State University; Fort Collins, Colorado, U.S.
- Coordinates: 40°34′12″N 105°05′19″W
- Elevation: 5,003 feet (1,525 m) AMSL
- Owner: Colorado State University
- Operator: Colorado State University
- Capacity: 41,000
- Surface: Shaw Sports Artificial turf

Construction
- Groundbreaking: September 14, 2015
- Opened: August 5, 2017; 9 years ago
- Cost: $220.1 million ($289 million in 2025)
- Architects: Populous; ICON Venue Group
- General contractor: M. A. Mortenson Co.

Tenant
- Colorado State Rams (NCAA) (2017–present)

Website
- csurams.com/canvas-stadium

Canvas Stadium, officially Sonny Lubick Field at Canvas Stadium, is an outdoor college football stadium in the Western United States, located on the campus of Colorado State University (CSU) in Fort Collins, Colorado.

The home field of the CSU Rams of the Pac-12 Conference, it opened on August 5, 2017, and hosted its first game three weeks later. It replaced Sonny Lubick Field at Hughes Stadium, which had been the Rams' home since 1968. Canvas Stadium has a seating capacity of 36,500, but can hold as many as 41,000.

The field has a conventional north–south alignment at an elevation of 5,003 feet (1,525 m) above sea level.

== Cost and construction ==
After a nearly two-year process including cost and financing changes, protests, community outreach, and an inter-governmental agreement with the city of Fort Collins, the $220 million, 41,000-capacity on-campus multi-purpose stadium began construction in May 2015.

In 2013, the university began raising funds for a ~40,000-seat on-campus facility to replace Hughes Stadium. The project was partially driven by major decreases in state funding for CSU in recent decades. As a result, CSU has been seeking to draw more out-of-state students, whose current tuition is three times that of Colorado residents. CSU president Anthony A. Frank included the new stadium as part of this goal saying "the new facility will help build a winning football team while advancing one of the school's highest priorities: attracting more out-of-state students".

The new stadium, initially estimated to cost $246 million, was originally only to be built if $125 million in private funds had been raised by October 2014. Plans were put on hold after fundraising support for the project failed to materialize as expected, according to a September 26, 2014, story in the Denver Business Journal. On November 29, 2014, Frank sent a memo to the school's board of governors recommending that the new stadium be approved without raising the 50% cost in public funds as previously planned. The memo estimated that a 35,900-seat facility would cost $195 million; building with a capacity of 41,200 would cost $220 million. Frank also estimated that renovating Hughes Stadium to last 30 to 40 years would cost a minimum of $149 million. After 22 months, the construction of Canvas stadium came to an end. The stadium currently sits at a maximum height of 123 feet and the total 727,000 square feet includes Sonny Lubick Field, weight room, meeting rooms, offices, lounges, and classrooms.

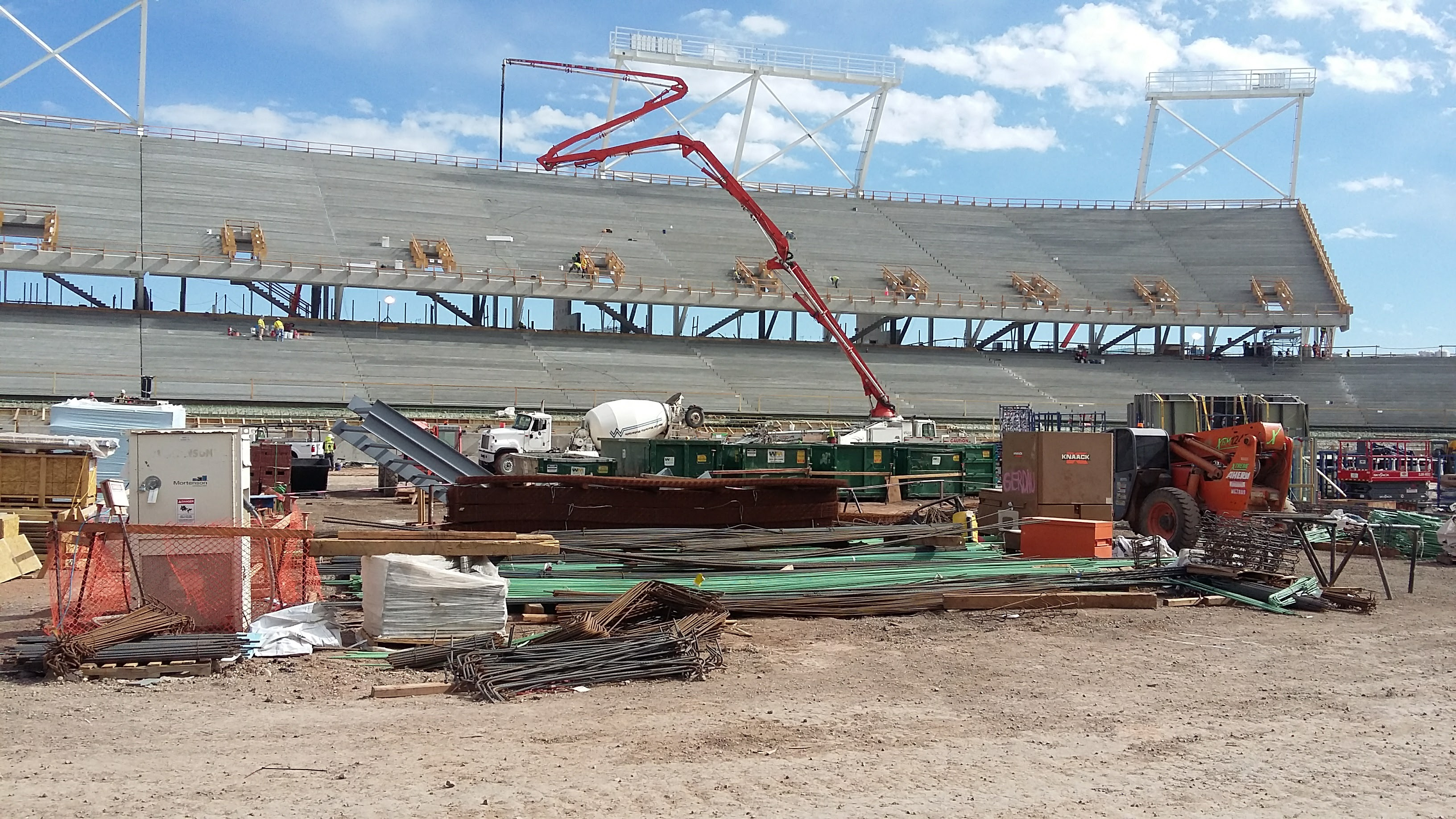
The stadium under construction

Construction of the new stadium, tentatively known as Colorado State Stadium, began in May 2015; the official groundbreaking ceremony was held the weekend of CSU's September 12, 2015 home football game against Minnesota. The first game in the new stadium was August 26, 2017, when the Rams defeated Oregon State 58–27.

== Stadium donations ==
In March 2016, the university announced that it had received an anonymous gift of $20 million over a 30-year period with the express purpose of naming the playing field at the new stadium after former Rams head coach Sonny Lubick, whose name was also attached to the playing field at Hughes Stadium. This gift was roughly the amount that the university had hoped to make by selling the naming rights to both the stadium and the field.

In August of that year, New Belgium Brewing Company, an iconic, local Fort Collins brewery, donated $4.3 million to put its name and its product on the party deck of the north end zone of the $220 million stadium. This new bar area is called the New Belgium Porch.

On April 19, 2018, CSU announced it had sold the naming rights of the stadium itself to Public Service Credit Union for $37.7 million over 15 years. The actual name was not revealed at that time because PSCU was in the process of adopting a new name, which was ultimately revealed on June 5 of that year as Canvas Credit Union. Accordingly, the stadium became Canvas Stadium.

=== Sponsors ===
- Canvas Credit Union
- Coca-cola
- Orthopedic & Spine Center of The Rockies
- Wagner Rents
- McDonalds
- Interstate All Battery Centers
- Breeze Thru Car Wash
- K99
- New Belgium Brewing
- Under Armour
- UCHealth
- Fort Collins KN
- Strategic Wealth Designers
- The OBC Wine Project
- FNBO
- Otterbox
- XGolf
- Remax
- Raising Canes
- Coors Light
- Lucky Joes
- The Human Bean
- Pedersan Toyota

== Discussion of development ==
According to The Wall Street Journal,

"Skeptics, including some alumni and faculty, see the project as a boondoggle—especially for a team that plays in a relatively low-profile athletic conference and doesn't sell out its current 32,500-seat stadium off campus. The debate has sparked dueling websites, animated letters to the editor and arguments about the role of sports at a university."

The board of governors approved a new on campus multi-purpose stadium on December 5, 2014. At that time, NBCSports.com writer Brent Sobleski speculated that the hiring of Rams head coach Jim McElwain for the head coaching vacancy at Florida days earlier may have swayed the board, noting, "An improving program and a new stadium could help lure another top-level candidate like the school previously did when McElwain was initially hired."

CSU went on to hire Mike Bobo from the SEC like McElwain before him. University of Georgia's Coach Bobo was named the nation's Offensive Coordinator of the Year in 2013 by 247Sports.com. Georgia also had the top scoring offense in the SEC in 2014, Bobo's last season before heading to CSU.

Many community members expressed frustration that they did not feel they were being heard at the CSU Board of Governors meeting when final approval was given. After the vote Board chair, Dorothy Horrell, thanked those making comments for their input and reiterated her feeling that

"the decision to build an on-campus stadium was made after "thoughtful and thorough examination of this issue" that is reflected in the board's records. "As my parents used to tell me, just because I ask a question and didn't get the answer I wanted, it isn't that the question wasn't answered," Horrell said. "And I would just remind us all of that."

== Other events ==
Aside from being used for football, Canvas stadium hosts a variety of different events including concerts, meetings and banquets, community and private events, and major public events. In July of 2025, Professional Bull Riders held an event labeled CSU PBR Last Cowboy Standing featuring Cross Canadian Ragweed and Jon Pardi. The stadium has also been used to host many community events such as the Northern Colorado 9/11 Memorial & Stair Climb and the Turning Point USA Charlie Kirk vigil.

== Traditions ==
The cannon, nicknamed “Comatose”, has been used by Colorado State University’s football team since 1920. The cannon itself was built in France in 1918 and has never been replaced by the school. Due to the Covid-19 Pandemic, the cannon was temporarily retired and was officially brought back in 2022.

The Fight Song has been a staple of CSU football since 1910. The current “Colorado State University Fight Song” was written in 1932 by Richard F. Bourne made its debut only a few days after its creation. Over the years there have been multiple fight songs including “Come on Aggie’s” and the “Aggie Boom Song”. The “Stalwart Ram’s” fight song was officially adopted in 1957 after a few minor changes to remove “Aggies” from the song after Colorado A&M became Colorado State University.

A new Canvas Stadium tradition unveiled in 2025 was the third down train horn. Many people have found this new tradition unassuming, stating that it is far too “loud” and “frequent”. The CSU has addressed these concerns in hopes to keep this new tradition alive.

=== Old Main Bell ===
A 450-pound bell was housed at the Old Main Building, and was rung after a CSU Football Victory. The bell was stolen in 1919 and buried for 50 years, then to be unearthed and placed in the Executive Director of the Alumni Association's driveway. Now, the bell is housed in a tower built into the Iris & Michael Smith Alumni Center and continues to ring after victory.

== Attendance records ==
Canvas Stadium has a seating capacity of 36,500, but can hold as many as 41,000.

Rank	Attendance	Date	Game Result
1	40,548	September 5, 2026	Colorado State 35, Wyoming 13
2	40,416	October 18, 2025	Colorado State 19, Hawaii 31
3	40,099	September 14, 2024	Colorado State 9, Colorado 28
4	38,759	September 19, 2026	Colorado State 23, BYU 41
5	37,583	August 26, 2017	Colorado State 58, Oregon State 27
6	37,023	September 6, 2025	Colorado State 21, Northern Colorado 17
7	36,980	October 26, 2024	Colorado State 17, New Mexico 6
8	36,765	October 14, 2017	Colorado State 44, Nevada 42
9	36,720	November 15, 2024	Colorado State 24, Wyoming 10
10	36,573	September 7, 2024	Colorado State 38, Northern Colorado 17
11	36,514	October 13, 2018	Colorado State 20, New Mexico 18
12	35,749	September 12, 2026	Colorado State 58, Southern Utah 24
13	35,009	October 15, 2022	Colorado State 13, Utah State 17
14	34,901	October 14, 2023	Colorado State 31, Boise State 30
15	34,780	October 9, 2021	Colorado State 32, San Jose State 14
16	33,895	October 29, 2022	Colorado State 10, Boise State 49
17	33,074	October 28, 2017	Colorado State 28, Air Force 45
18	32,327	September 3, 2021	Colorado State 23, South Dakota State 42
19	32,166	November 11, 2017	Colorado State 52, Boise State 59^{OT}
20	32,125	October 26, 2018	Colorado State 21, Wyoming 34

== Canvas Stadium coaching history ==
Coach	Years	Conference	Reason for Termination
Mike Bobo	2015-2019	Mountain West Conference	"Mutual Separation"
Steve Addazio	2020-2021	Mountain West Conference	Fired
Jay Norvell	2022-2025	Mountain West Conference	"Stalled Progress"

== Gallery ==
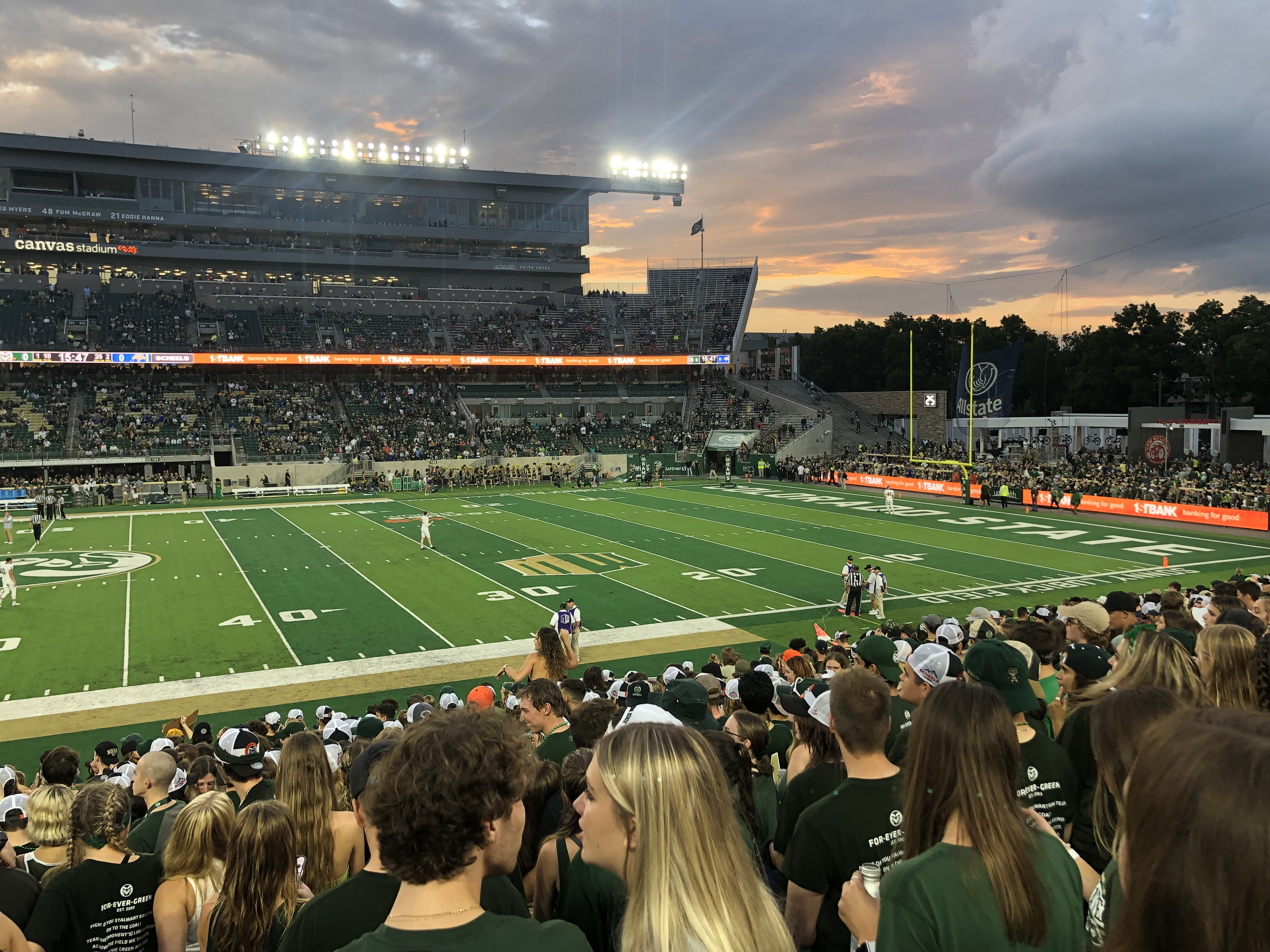

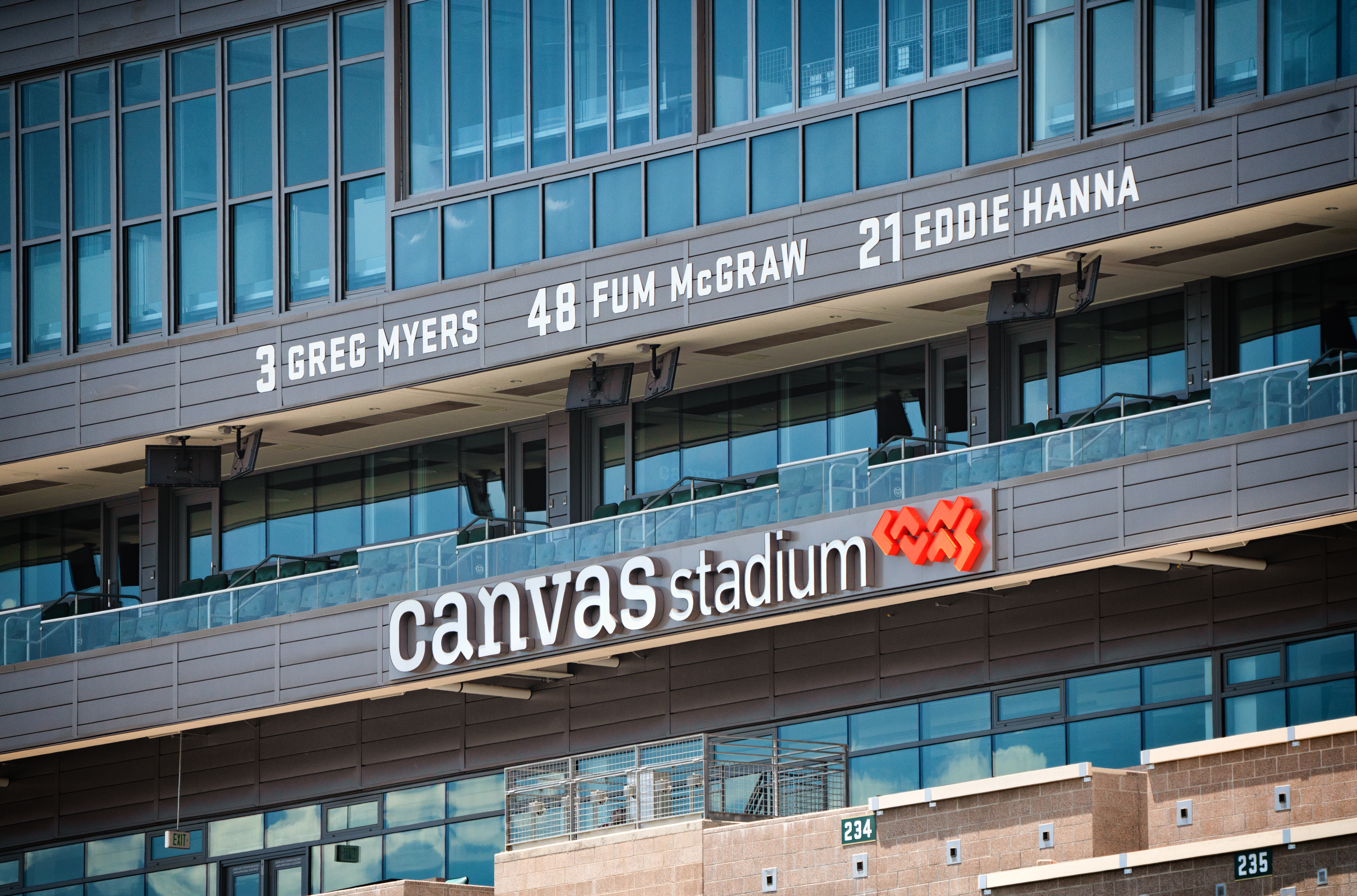

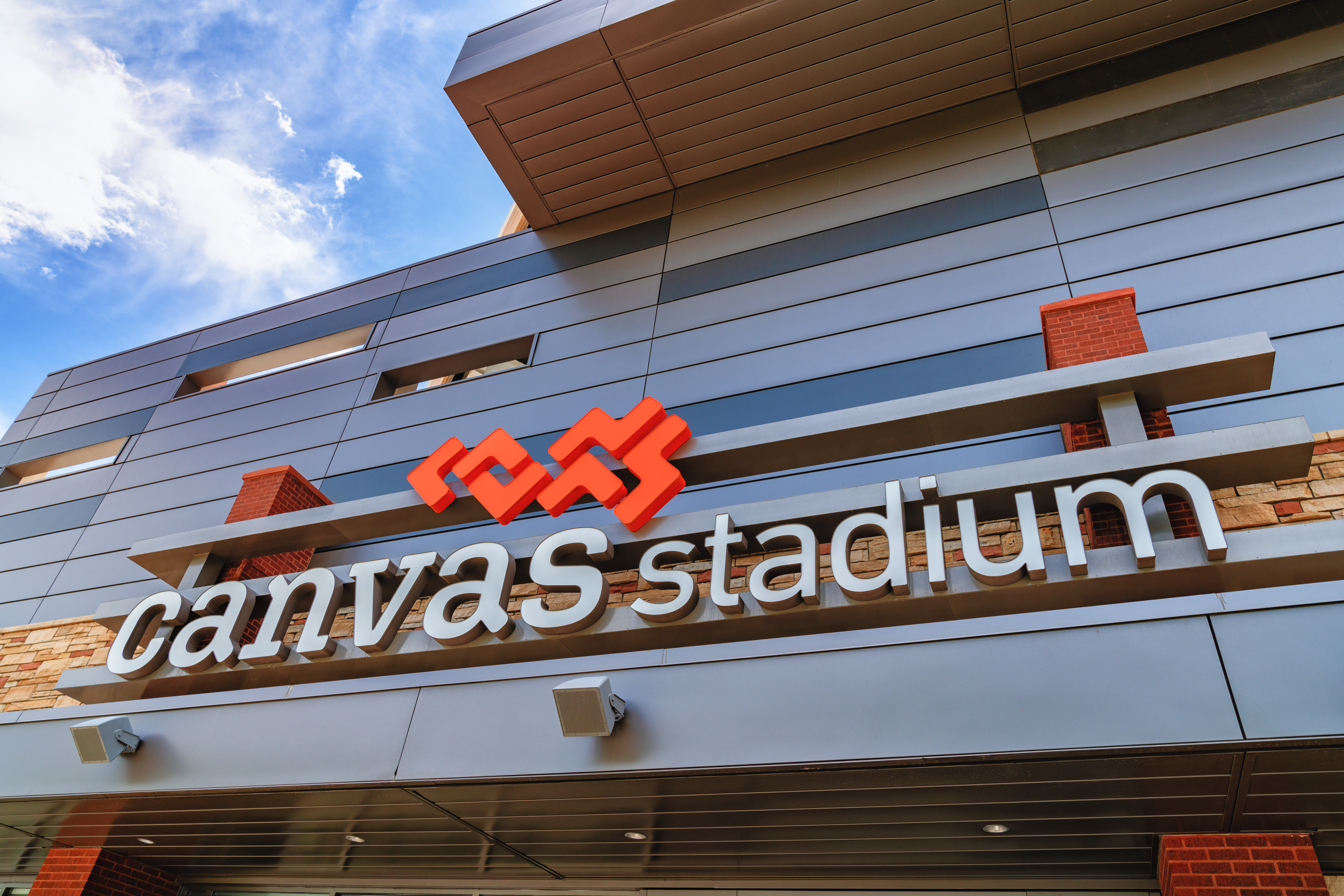

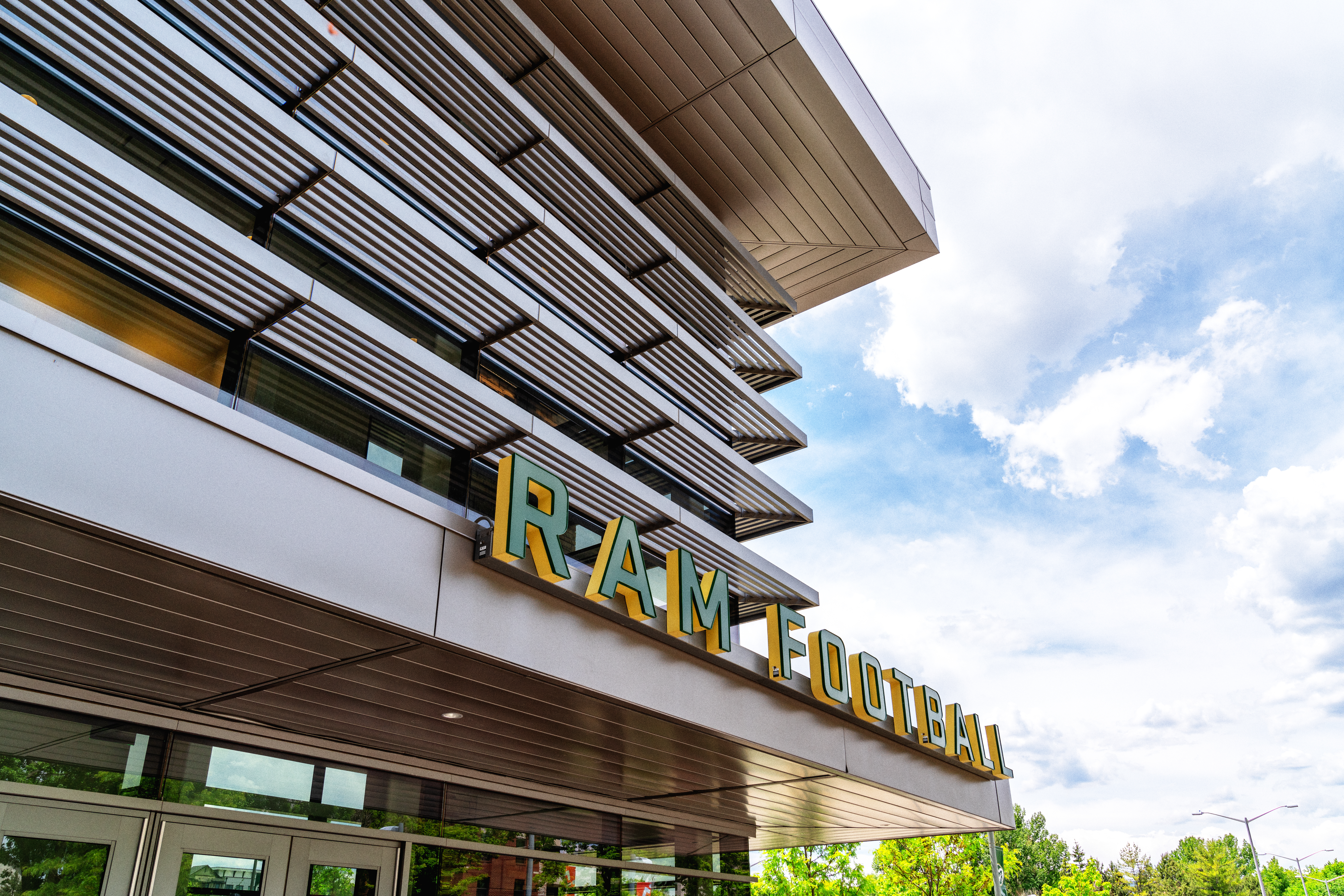

== See also ==
- List of NCAA Division I FBS football stadiums
- Colorado State University
- Colorado State Rams football
- Stadium
- Colorado State Rams football statistical leaders
- Sonny Lubick Field at Hughes Stadium
- List of Colorado State Rams head football coaches
- Colorado State University Fight Song
