= 1908 Colorado Agricultural Aggies football team =

American college football season

1908 Colorado Agricultural Aggies football
- Conference: Colorado Football Association
- Record: 1–3 (0–3 CFA)
- Head coach: Claude Rothgeb (3rd season)
- Home stadium: Durkee Field

1908 Colorado Football Association standings
| | Conf. | | | | | Overall |
| Team | W | | L | | T | W | | L | | T |
|---|---|---|---|---|---|---|---|---|---|---|
| Denver $ | 4 | – | 0 | – | 0 | 7 | – | 1 | – | 0 |
| Colorado | 3 | – | 1 | – | 0 | 5 | – | 2 | – | 0 |
| Colorado College | 2 | – | 1 | – | 0 | 6 | – | 1 | – | 0 |
| Colorado Agricultural | 0 | – | 2 | – | 0 | 1 | – | 3 | – | 0 |
| Colorado Mines | 0 | – | 3 | – | 0 | 2 | – | 3 | – | 0 |
$ – Conference champion

The 1908 Colorado Agricultural Aggies football team represented Colorado Agricultural College (now known as Colorado State University) in the Colorado Football Association (CFA) during the 1908 college football season. In their third season under head coach Claude Rothgeb, the Aggies compiled a 1–3 record (0–2 against CFA opponents) and were outscored by a total of 58 to 30.

== Schedule ==
| Date | Opponent | Site | Result | Source |
|---|---|---|---|---|
| October 17 | at Denver | Denver, CO | L 0–17 | |
| October 24 | Colorado | Fort Collins, CO (rivalry) | L 0–8 | |
| November 14 | at Wyoming* | Laramie, WY (rivalry) | W 20–0 | |
| November 26 | at Kansas State* | Manhattan, KS | L 10–33 | |
*Non-conference game
