= C. J. Griffith =

American football player and coach (1877–1937)

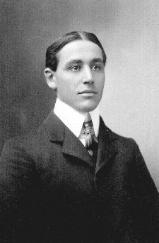

Biographical details
- Born: April 9, 1877; Storm Lake, Iowa, U.S.
- Died: November 3, 1937 (aged 60); Oakley, Idaho, U.S.
- Education: Iowa State College (1899)

Playing career
- 1899: Iowa State

Coaching career (HC unless noted)
- 1900: Colorado Agricultural (assistant)
- 1901–1902: Colorado Agricultural

Head coaching record
- Overall: 2–5–2

Clarence James Griffith (April 9, 1877 – November 3, 1937) was an American college football coach. He served as the head football coach at Colorado Agricultural College—now known as Colorado State University—from 1901 to 1902, compiling a record of 2–5–2. A graduate of Iowa State University, Griffith was the assistant coach under George Toomey at Colorado Agricultural in 1900. When Toomey stepped down after the controversy of Joseph Dibble being a professional, Griffith took over as head coach for the remainder of the 1901 season. He also coached the Aggies in 1902 but resigned in 1903 after the birth of his first child, in Colorado.

Griffith died from heart failure aged 60, in Oakley, Idaho, on November 3, 1937.

== Head coaching record ==
Year	Team	Overall	Conference	Standing
Colorado Agricultural Aggies (Colorado Football Association) (1901–1902)
1901	Colorado Agricultural	1–2	0–2	4th
1902	Colorado Agricultural	1–3–2	0–3–1	5th
Colorado Agricultural:		2–5–2	0–5–1	
Total:		2–5–2		
