= John H. McIntosh =

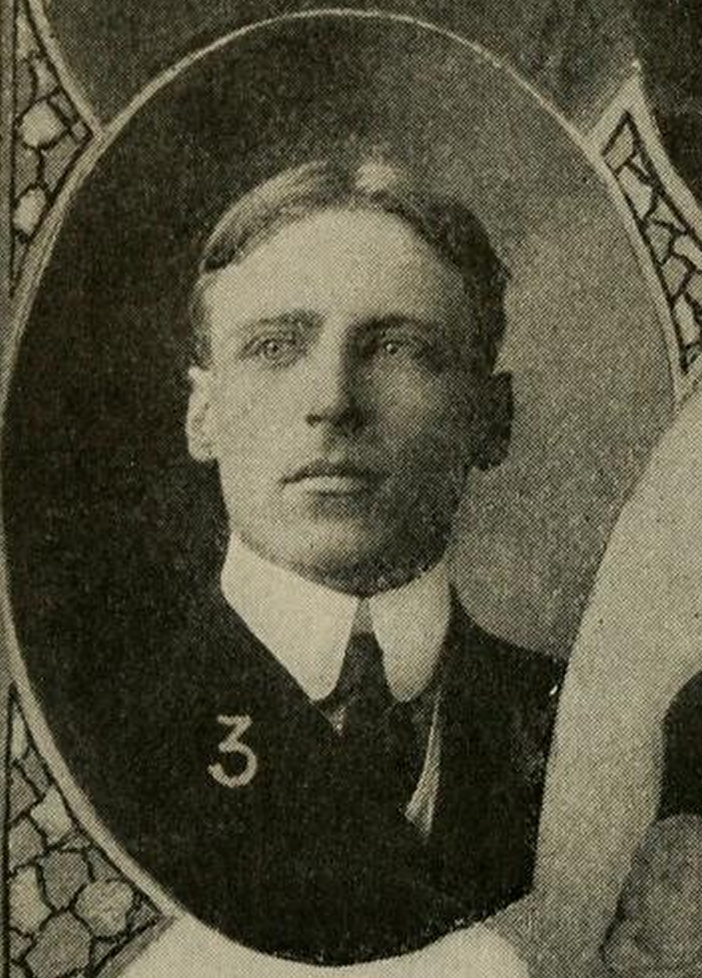
- McIntosh pictured in Spalding's official football guide, 1906

Biographical details
- Born: February 1, 1879; Early County, Georgia, U.S.
- Died: July 14, 1925 (aged 46); Seattle, Washington, U.S.

Playing career

Football
- 1898–1899: Georgia
- Positions: Fullback (football); Right fielder (baseball)

Coaching career (HC unless noted)

Football
- 1904–1905: Colorado Agricultural
- 1908–1910: Montana Agricultural

Basketball
- 1908–1911: Montana Agricultural

Baseball
- 1909–1910: Montana Agricultural

Administrative career (AD unless noted)
- c. 1900: Colorado Mines
- 1904–1905: Colorado Agricultural
- 1908–1910: Montana Agricultural

Head coaching record
- Overall: 8–18–6 (football)

John Houston McIntosh (February 1, 1879 – July 14, 1925) was an American college football player and coach, college athletics administrator, lawyer, and newspaper editor. He served as the head football coach at Colorado Agricultural College (now known as Colorado State University) from 1904 to 1906 and the Agricultural College of the State of Montana (now known as Montana State University) from 1908 to 1910. McIntosh was a star athlete at the University of Georgia in the late 1890s, and later moved west to coach football.

== Early life and college career ==
McIntosh was born on February 1, 1879, in Early County, Georgia, the son of Dr. B. L. McIntosh. His ancestors immigrated from Scotland and settled in Georgia. McIntosh County, Georgia was named for his family.

McIntosh graduated from the University of Georgia with a Doctor of Law in 1899. He was captain of the track team, a fullback on the football team, and played right field on the baseball team.

== Move west ==
McIntosh moved west to New Mexico and continued his practice as a lawyer. After one season at the Colorado School of Mines, McIntosh became the first athletic director at Colorado State. He was then athletic director and professor of English at Montana State College.

McIntosh committed suicide on July 14, 1925, when he jumped out of the window of his office at the American Bank building in Seattle.

== Legacy and honors ==
The World War II Liberty Ship SS John H. McIntosh was named in his honor.

== Head coaching record ==
=== Football ===
Year	Team	Overall	Conference	Standing
Colorado Agricultural Aggies (Colorado Football Association) (1904–1905)
1904	Colorado Agricultural	0–4–1	0–4	5th
1905	Colorado Agricultural	3–4	2–3	
Colorado Agricultural:		3–8–1	2–7	
Montana Agricultural (Independent) (1908–1910)
1908	Montana Agricultural	3–1–2		
1909	Montana Agricultural	0–6–1		
1910	Montana Agricultural	2–3–2		
Montana Agricultural:		5–10–5		
Total:		8–18–6		
