= Claude Rothgeb =

American athlete and coach (1880–1944)

- Rothgeb pictured in The Campanile 1929, Rice yearbook

Biographical details
- Born: January 1, 1880; Milford, Illinois, U.S.
- Died: July 5, 1944 (aged 64); Manitowish Waters, Wisconsin, U.S.

Playing career

Football
- 1900: Illinois
- 1902–1904: Illinois

Baseball
- 1904–1905: Illinois
- 1905: Washington Senators
- Positions: End (football); Right fielder (baseball)

Coaching career (HC unless noted)

Football
- 1906–1909: Colorado Agricultural
- 1910–1918: Colorado College
- 1922: Illinois (ends)
- 1925: Texas A&M (assistant)
- 1927: Rice (line)
- 1928: Rice

Basketball
- 1905–1908: Colorado Agricultural
- 1909–1910: Colorado Agricultural
- 1915–1919: Colorado College

Baseball
- 1908–1909: Colorado Agricultural
- 1925–1927: Texas A&M

Administrative career (AD unless noted)
- 1906–1910: Colorado Agricultural

Head coaching record
- Overall: 46–36–3 (football); 34–12 (basketball); 38–23–2 (baseball)

Accomplishments and honors

Championships
- Football; RMC (1910)

Awards
- Football: Third-team All-American (1904); First-team All-Western (1904)

Claude James Rothgeb (January 1, 1880 – July 5, 1944) was an American football, basketball, baseball player, and coach. He served as the head football coach at the Agricultural College of Colorado, now Colorado State University, from 1906 to 1909, at Colorado College from 1910 to 1918, and at Rice University in 1928, compiling a career college football record of 47–36–3. Rothgeb played football and basketball and ran track at the University of Illinois at Urbana–Champaign, from which he graduated in 1905. He played for Major League Baseball's Washington Senators in 1905.

Rothgeb died at Voss' Birchwood Lodge in Manitowish Waters, Wisconsin.

== Head coaching record ==
=== Football ===
Year	Team	Overall	Conference	Standing
Colorado Agricultural Aggies (Colorado Football Association) (1906–1908)
1906	Colorado Agricultural	1–2–1	1–2–1	T–4th
1907	Colorado Agricultural	0–4	0–4	5th
1908	Colorado Agricultural	1–3	0–2	4th
Colorado Agricultural Aggies (Colorado Faculty Athletic Conference) (1909)
1909	Colorado Agricultural	1–2	0–2	T–3rd
Colorado Agricultural:		3–11–1	1–10–1	
Colorado College Tigers (Rocky Mountain Conference) (1910–1918)
1910	Colorado College	7–0	4–0	1st
1911	Colorado College	4–3	3–2	4th
1912	Colorado College	5–4	2–4	5th
1913	Colorado College	5–2–1	2–2–1	T–3rd
1914	Colorado College	4–1–1	3–1–1	3rd
1915	Colorado College	6–2	3–2	4th
1916	Colorado College	6–1	4–1	2nd
1917	Colorado College	3–3	2–3	T–5th
1918	Colorado College	1–2	1–2	T–3rd
Colorado College:		41–18–2	24–17–2	
Rice Owls (Southwest Conference) (1928)
1928	Rice	2–7	0–5	7th
Rice:		2–7	0–5	
Total:		46–36–3		
National championship Conference title Conference division title or championship game berth
