= George Toomey =

American football player and coach

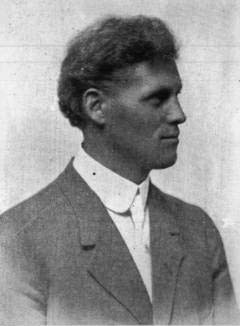

Biographical details
- Born: October 17, 1873; Americus, Kansas, U.S.
- Died: c. 1932
- Education: University of Denver; Kansas City Medical School

Playing career
- 1891–1894: Baker

Coaching career (HC unless noted)
- 1900: Colorado State

Head coaching record
- Overall: 1–3

George Emanuel Toomey (October 17, 1873 – c. 1932) was an American college football coach. He served as the head football coach at Colorado Agricultural College—now known as Colorado State University for one season, in 1900, compiling a record of 1–3. He forced to resign following a scandal in 1901 regarding his playing a professional player. Toomey graduated from University of Denver in 1898, where he was a member of the baseball team, the Beta Theta Pi fraternity, and leader of the glee club. His hometown was Cottonwood Falls, Kansas, and he had previously attended Baker University. In 1900, Toomey had also been named professor of Oratory at Colorado State.

He later returned to Kansas where he was an evangelist. He died around 1932.

== Head coaching record ==
Year	Team	Overall	Conference	Standing
Colorado Agricultural Aggies (Colorado Football Association) (1900)
1900	Colorado Agricultural	1–3	0–3	4th
Colorado Agricultural:		1–3	0–3	
Total:		1–3		
