= Washburn Field =

Stadium in Colorado Springs, Colorado

Coordinates: 38.848015°N 104.827637°W

Washburn Field is a 1,500-seat stadium located in Colorado Springs, Colorado. It is home of the field sports teams from Colorado College and is the oldest college football facility west of the Mississippi River, having hosted its first game in 1898. It once was home to the Colorado Springs Blizzard; that team ceased to exist in 2006.
