= Gamble Field =

Demolished football stadium at the University of Colorado

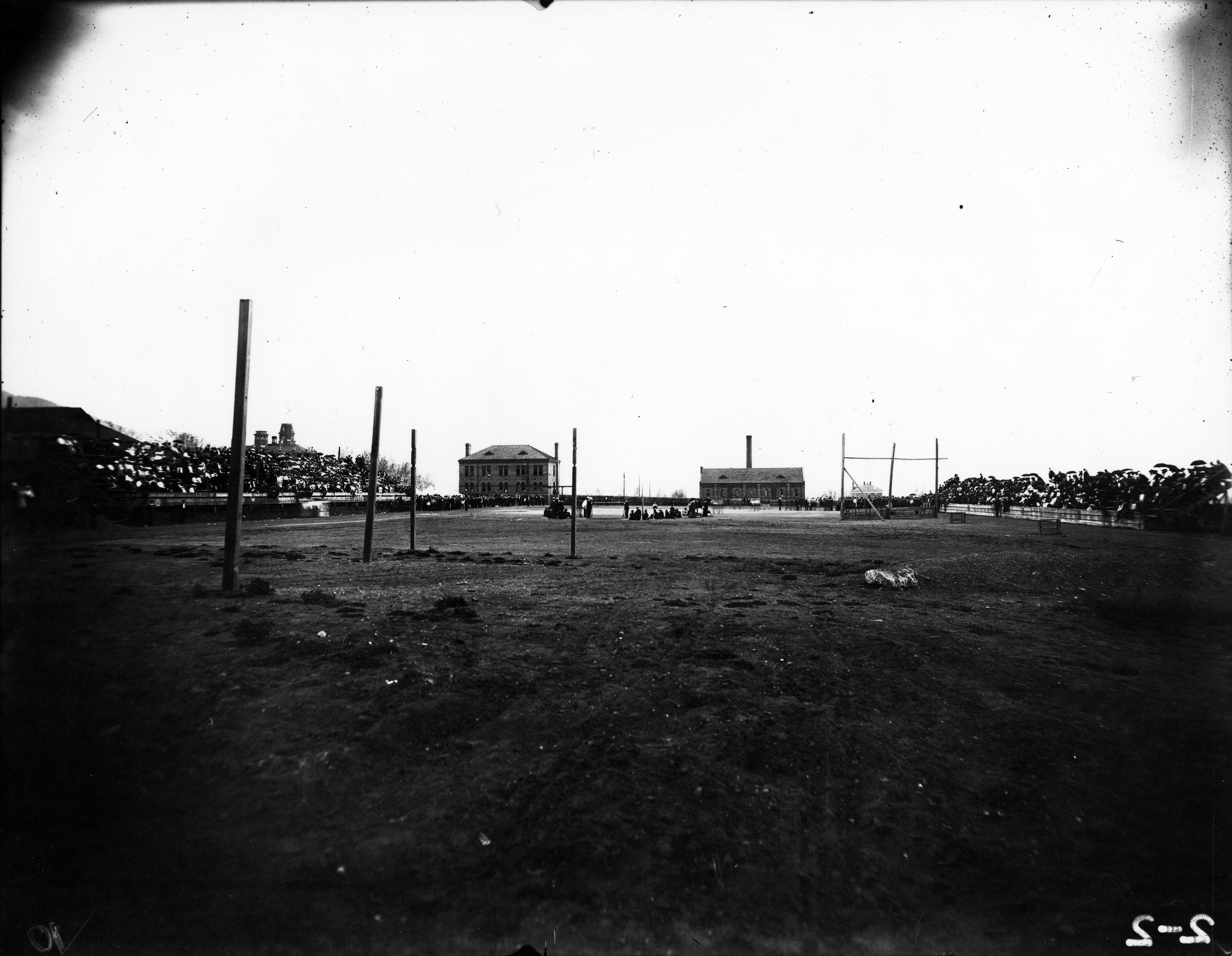
- Gamble Field before 1906

- Location in the United States Location in Colorado
- Interactive map of Gamble Field
- Address: Euclid Avenue
- Location: University of Colorado; Boulder, Colorado, U.S. (now University Memorial Center)
- Coordinates: 40.0067°N 105.2715°W
- Owner: University of Colorado
- Operator: University of Colorado
- Capacity: 1,000 (1901–19xx); ~8,000 (19xx–1924)

Construction
- Opened: September 21, 1901; 124 years ago
- Closed: October 1924; 101 years ago (to football)

Tenant
- Colorado Buffaloes (multiple sports)

Gamble Field was an outdoor sports stadium in the Western United States, located on the campus of the University of Colorado in Boulder. It was the predecessor of Folsom Field.

== History ==
Opened 125 years ago in 1901 on September 21, it was built via the efforts of the university's student body. The field was named after Judge Harry P. Gamble, a six-time (1891–96) football letterman and two-time captain.

Seating capacity was initially limited to 1,000 via a 160-foot (50 m) wooden grandstand located on the western side of the field, the only side that had seating. The elevation of the playing field was just over 5,400 feet (1,645 m) above sea level.

== Usage ==
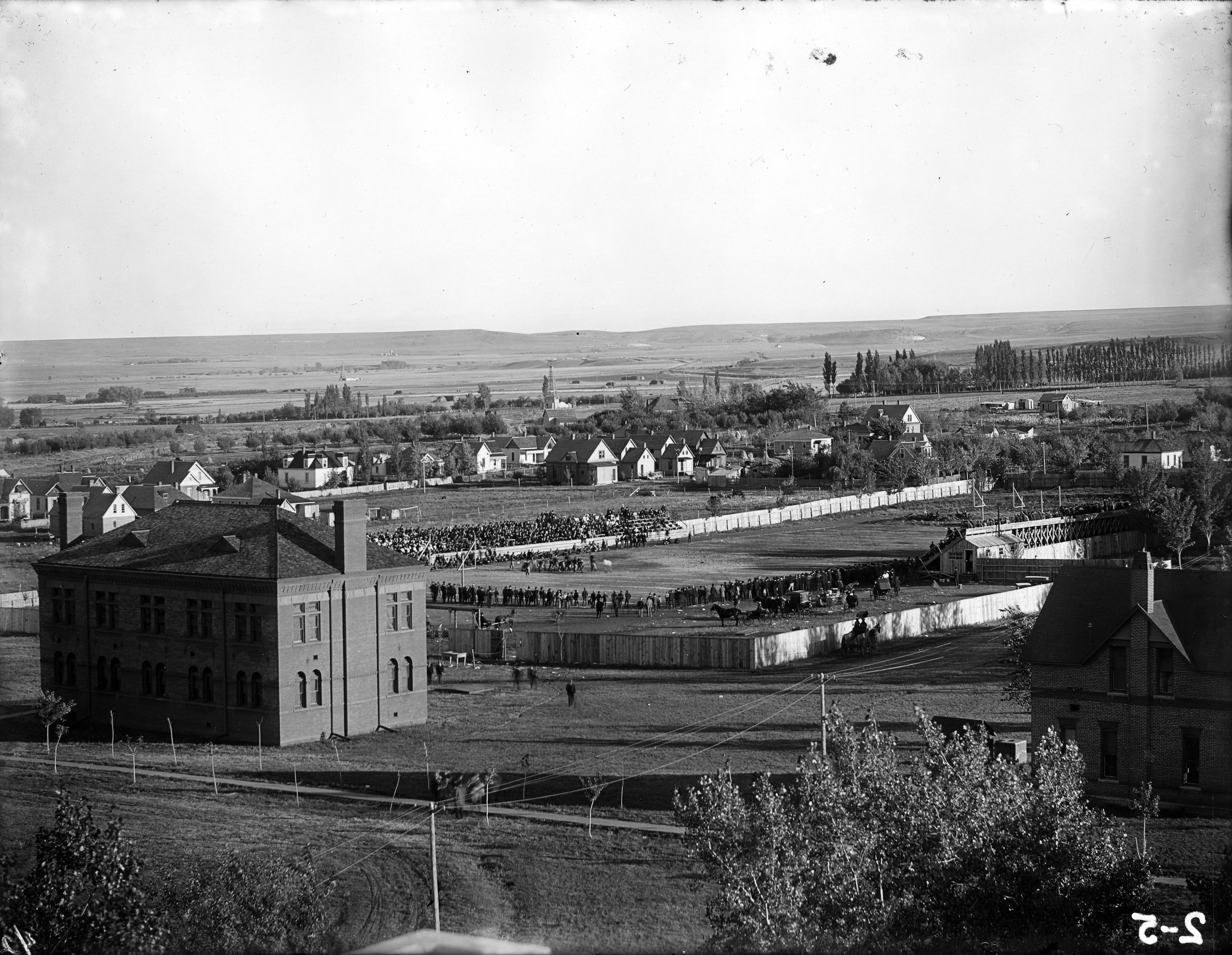
Game v Nebraska in 1902

Gamble served multiple types of events, including university football, baseball, track and field, as well as rallies and other events. The field was surrounded by a quarter-mile track, with baseball played with some adjustments to the field and rules specific to Gamble Field. The complex was surrounded by a wooden wall.

The last football game at Gamble was a 31–0 win in the season opener on October 4, 1924, with the team moving to the larger Colorado Stadium for the remainder of the year. The Colorado football team compiled a 112–45–12 (.698) record during the 24 years of use, including a 21-game winning streak over five seasons.

The University Memorial Center is now located on the site.
