= Rocky Mountain Showdown =

Collegiate football rivalry between Colorado and Colorado State

- Colorado Buffaloes Colorado State Rams
- First meeting: February 10, 1893; Colorado 70–6
- Latest meeting: September 14, 2024; Colorado 28–9
- Next meeting: September 15, 2029 at Fort Collins
- Trophy: Centennial Cup

Statistics
- Total meetings: 93
- All-time series: Colorado, 69–22–2 (.753)
- Largest victory: Colorado, 67–0 (1894)
- Longest win streak: Colorado, 12 (1934–1947)
- Current win streak: Colorado, 7 (2015–present)

Locations of Colorado and Colorado State

The Rocky Mountain Showdown is the name given to the Colorado–Colorado State football rivalry. It is an American college football intrastate rivalry between the University of Colorado Buffaloes and the Colorado State University Rams; the winner of the game receives the Centennial Cup. It began in 1893 and was played annually from 1899 to 1958, except for 1901, 1905, and 1943–44. It was revived in 1983 and played periodically until it became an annual rivalry once again from 1995 to 2019. Since 2019, it has again been played periodically.

From 1998 to 2019, the game was usually played in Denver at Mile High Stadium and its replacement, Empower Field at Mile High, although the 2004, 2005, and 2009 games were played at CU's Folsom Field in Boulder. Empower Field, the home of the NFL's Denver Broncos, is considered neutral ground for both teams and has a greater capacity than either home stadium. Since 2019, the game has returned to being played at campus sites.

In August 2009, both universities agreed to extend the Showdown until 2020, with the 2010–19 games all to be played at Broncos Stadium. The game was played in Boulder as planned in 2009. In 2015, Colorado athletic director Rick George stated that he wanted to return the series to campus sites, but that it was not in Colorado's best interest to extend the series.

Because the Pac-12 restricted member schools to conference play in fall sports in response to the COVID-19 pandemic, the game was canceled for 2020, which marked the first year since 1994 without the rivalry game. The teams met for the first time in four years in 2023 at Boulder, and again in Fort Collins the following year. The next scheduled game is not until 2029 in Fort Collins on September 15.

== Game results ==
Colorado victories	Colorado State victories	Tie games

No.	Date	Location	Winning team		Losing team	
1	February 10, 1893	Boulder	Colorado	70	Colorado Agricultural	6
2	October 7, 1893	Boulder	Colorado	44	Colorado Agricultural	6
3	October 27, 1894	Boulder	Colorado	67	Colorado Agricultural	0
4	October 15, 1899	Boulder	Colorado	63	Colorado Agricultural	0
5	October 15, 1900	Boulder	Colorado	29	Colorado Agricultural	0
6	October 18, 1902	Boulder	Colorado	11	Colorado Agricultural	7
7	October 10, 1903	Fort Collins	Colorado	5	Colorado Agricultural	0
8	November 13, 1904	Boulder	Colorado	46	Colorado Agricultural	0
9	November 10, 1906	Fort Collins	Tie	0	Tie	0
10	October 19, 1907	Boulder	Colorado	17	Colorado Agricultural	13
11	October 24, 1908	Fort Collins	Colorado	8	Colorado Agricultural	0
12	October 23, 1909	Boulder	Colorado	57	Colorado Agricultural	0
13	November 12, 1910	Fort Collins	Colorado	44	Colorado Agricultural	0
14	November 11, 1911	Boulder	Colorado	31	Colorado Agricultural	0
15	October 12, 1912	Fort Collins	Colorado Agricultural	21	Colorado	0
16	October 18, 1913	Boulder	Colorado	16	Colorado Agricultural	7
17	October 17, 1914	Fort Collins	Colorado	33	Colorado Agricultural	6
18	October 9, 1915	Boulder	Colorado Agricultural	23	Colorado	6
19	November 30, 1916	Boulder	Colorado Agricultural	32	Colorado	14
20	October 6, 1917	Fort Collins	Colorado	6	Colorado Agricultural	0
21	November 28, 1918	Boulder	Colorado	16	Colorado Agricultural	13
22	October 11, 1919	Fort Collins	Colorado Agricultural	49	Colorado	7
23	November 20, 1920	Boulder	Tie	7	Tie	7
24	November 19, 1921	Fort Collins	Colorado	10	Colorado Agricultural	0
25	November 4, 1922	Boulder	Colorado	7	Colorado Agricultural	0
26	November 28, 1923	Fort Collins	Colorado	6	Colorado Agricultural	3
27	November 22, 1924	Boulder	Colorado	36	Colorado Agricultural	0
28	November 14, 1925	Fort Collins	Colorado Agricultural	12	Colorado	0
29	November 13, 1926	Boulder	Colorado Agricultural	3	Colorado	0
30	November 19, 1927	Fort Collins	Colorado Agricultural	39	Colorado	7
31	November 10, 1928	Boulder	Colorado	13	Colorado Agricultural	7
32	November 16, 1929	Fort Collins	Colorado	6	Colorado Agricultural	0
33	October 25, 1930	Boulder	Colorado	7	Colorado Agricultural	0
34	October 24, 1931	Fort Collins	Colorado Agricultural	19	Colorado	6
35	October 22, 1932	Boulder	Colorado Agricultural	7	Colorado	6
36	October 21, 1933	Fort Collins	Colorado Agricultural	19	Colorado	6
37	October 27, 1934	Boulder	Colorado	27	Colorado Agricultural	9
38	October 26, 1935	Boulder	Colorado	19	Colorado A&M	6
39	October 24, 1936	Fort Collins	Colorado	9	Colorado A&M	7
40	October 23, 1937	Boulder	Colorado	47	Colorado A&M	0
41	October 22, 1938	Fort Collins	Colorado	31	Colorado A&M	6
42	October 21, 1939	Boulder	Colorado	13	Colorado A&M	0
43	October 19, 1940	Fort Collins	Colorado	33	Colorado A&M	14
44	October 18, 1941	Boulder	Colorado	26	Colorado A&M	13
45	October 24, 1942	Fort Collins	Colorado	34	Colorado A&M	7
46	October 13, 1945	Fort Collins	Colorado	21	Colorado A&M	6
47	November 28, 1946	Boulder	Colorado	18	Colorado A&M	0

No.	Date	Location	Winning team		Losing team	
48	October 25, 1947	Fort Collins	Colorado	14	Colorado A&M	7
49	November 20, 1948	Boulder	Colorado A&M	29	Colorado	25
50	November 26, 1949	Boulder	Colorado A&M	14	Colorado	7
51	November 25, 1950	Fort Collins	Colorado	31	Colorado A&M	6
52	September 22, 1951	Boulder	Colorado	28	Colorado A&M	13
53	November 29, 1952	Boulder	Colorado	61	Colorado A&M	0
54	November 28, 1953	Fort Collins	Colorado	13	Colorado A&M	7
55	September 25, 1954	Boulder	Colorado	46	Colorado State	0
56	November 26, 1955	Fort Collins	Colorado A&M	10	Colorado	0
57	October 13, 1956	Boulder	Colorado	47	Colorado A&M	7
58	November 9, 1957	Fort Collins	Colorado	20	Colorado State	0
59	November 22, 1958	Boulder	Colorado State	15	Colorado	14
60	September 17, 1983	Boulder	Colorado	31	Colorado State	3
61	September 7, 1985	Boulder	Colorado	23	Colorado State	10
62	September 6, 1986	Boulder	Colorado State	23	Colorado	7
63	October 3, 1987	Fort Collins	Colorado	29	Colorado State	16
64	October 1, 1988	Fort Collins	Colorado	27	Colorado State	23
65	September 9, 1989	Boulder	#9 Colorado	45	Colorado State	20
66	September 5, 1992	Boulder	#12 Colorado	37	Colorado State	17
67	September 9, 1995	Boulder	#10 Colorado	42	Colorado State	14
68	September 7, 1996	Fort Collins	#5 Colorado	48	Colorado State	34
69	September 6, 1997	Boulder	#8 Colorado	31	Colorado State	21
70	September 5, 1998	Denver	Colorado	42	#15 Colorado State	14
71	September 4, 1999	Denver	Colorado State	41	#14 Colorado	14
72	September 2, 2000	Denver	Colorado State	28	#23 Colorado	24
73	September 1, 2001	Denver	Colorado	41	#24 Colorado State	14
74	August 31, 2002	Denver	Colorado State	19	#7 Colorado	14
75	August 30, 2003	Denver	Colorado	42	#23 Colorado State	35
76	September 4, 2004	Boulder	Colorado	27	Colorado State	24
77	September 3, 2005	Boulder	Colorado	31	Colorado State	28
78	September 9, 2006	Denver	Colorado State	14	Colorado	10
79	September 1, 2007	Denver	Colorado	31	Colorado State	28^{OT}
80	August 31, 2008	Denver	Colorado	38	Colorado State	17
81	September 6, 2009	Boulder	Colorado State	23	Colorado	17
82	September 4, 2010	Denver	Colorado	24	Colorado State	3
83	September 17, 2011	Denver	Colorado	28	Colorado State	14
84	September 1, 2012	Denver	Colorado State	22	Colorado	17
85	September 1, 2013	Denver	Colorado	41	Colorado State	27
86	August 29, 2014	Denver	Colorado State	31	Colorado	17
87	September 19, 2015	Denver	Colorado	27	Colorado State	24^{OT}
88	September 2, 2016	Denver	Colorado	44	Colorado State	7
89	September 1, 2017	Denver	Colorado	17	Colorado State	3
90	August 31, 2018	Denver	Colorado	45	Colorado State	13
91	August 30, 2019	Denver	Colorado	52	Colorado State	31
92	September 16, 2023	Boulder	#18 Colorado	43	Colorado State	35^{2OT}
93	September 14, 2024	Fort Collins	Colorado	28	Colorado State	9
Series: Colorado leads 69–22–2

== Rivalry beyond football ==
While football is the main aspect of the Colorado–Colorado State rivalry, the two schools are rivals in every sport.

In men's basketball, Colorado holds a 94–42 all-time record over Colorado State as of 2025.

In women's basketball, Colorado holds a 39–12 all-time record (since 1975) over Colorado State as of 2019.

In women's volleyball, Colorado State holds a 30–19 all-time record over Colorado as of 2025. The two volleyball programs have competed for the Golden Spike Trophy — a trophy featuring a vintage railroad spike that has been painted gold — since 2019.

== See also ==
- List of NCAA college football rivalry games
