= List of Colorado Buffaloes head football coaches =

The Colorado Buffaloes football program represents the University of Colorado Boulder in the Big 12 Conference of the National Collegiate Athletic Association. The team has had 25 head coaches since it started playing organized football in 1890. The university adopted the nickname Buffaloes in 1934 after previously being known as the Silver and Gold, Silver Helmets, Yellow Jackets, Hornets, Arapahoes, Big Horns, Grizzlies and Frontiersmen. Colorado played without a head coach during their first four years. The team first joined a conference in 1893 when they became a member of the Colorado Football Association. They joined the Colorado Faculty Athletic Conference in 1909, immediately followed by the Rocky Mountain Athletic Conference in 1910. Before the 1938 season, Colorado joined the Mountain States (Skyline) Conference. They joined the Big Seven Conference in 1948, which was renamed the Big Eight Conference in 1958 when Oklahoma State joined/rejoined the Conference. The Buffaloes became a charter member of the Big 12 in 1996 when the Big Eight disbanded. The Buffaloes have played in 1,139 games during their 120 seasons. In those seasons, nine coaches have led Colorado to postseason bowl games: Bunny Oakes, Dallas Ward, Bud Davis, Eddie Crowder, Bill Mallory, Bill McCartney, Rick Neuheisel, Gary Barnett, and Dan Hawkins. Nine coaches have won conference championships with the Buffaloes: Fred Folsom, Myron Witham, William Saunders, Oakes, Jim Yeager, Sonny Grandelius, Mallory, McCartney, and Barnett.

McCartney is the all-time leader in games coached, with 153, and total wins, with 93. Folsom had the longest tenure as head coach, remaining in the position for 15 seasons. Harry Heller and Willis Keinholtz are tied for the highest overall winning percentage. Each served a single season and won eight of his nine games for a winning percentage of .889. Of coaches who served more than one season, Folsom leads with a .765 winning percentage. Jon Embree is, in terms of overall winning percentage, the worst coach the Buffaloes have had with a .160 winning percentage. Former Colorado head coach Bill McCartney was inducted into the College Football Hall of Fame in 2013 and is the only CU coach to have won several national coach of the year honors, with all of them coming in 1989. Barnett won conference coach of the year honors in 2001 and 2004. Mike MacIntyre was hired on December 10, 2012.

== Key ==
Key to symbols in coaches list
| General | | Overall | | Conference | | Postseason (Note: Although the first Rose Bowl Game was played in 1902, it has been continuously played since the 1916 game, and is recognized as the oldest bowl game by the NCAA. "—" indicates any season prior to 1916 when postseason games were not played.) | |
|---|---|---|---|---|---|---|---|
| No. | Order of coaches (Note: A running total of the number of head coaches, with coaches who served separate tenures being counted only once. Interim head coaches are represented with "Int" and are not counted in the running total. "—" indicates the team played but either without a coach or no coach is on record. "X" indicates an interim year without play.) | GC | Games coached | CW | Conference wins | PW | Postseason wins |
| DC | Division championships | OW | Overall wins | CL | Conference losses | PL | Postseason losses |
| CC | Conference championships | OL | Overall losses | CT | Conference ties | PT | Postseason ties |
| NC | National championships | OT | Overall ties (Note: Overtime rules in college football were introduced in 1996, making ties impossible in the period since.) | C% | Conference winning percentage | | |
| † | Elected to the College Football Hall of Fame | O% | Overall winning percentage (Note: When computing the win–loss percentage, a tie counts as half a win and half a loss.) | | | | |

== Coaches ==
| No. | Name | Term | GC | OW | OL | OT | O% | CW | CL | CT | C% | PW | PL | CCs | Awards |
|---|---|---|---|---|---|---|---|---|---|---|---|---|---|---|---|
| 1 | Harry Heller | 1894 | 9 | 8 | 1 | 0 | .889 | 5 | 0 | 0 | 1.000 | — | — | — | — |
| 2 | Fred Folsom | 1895–1899, 1901–1902, 1908–1915 (Note: Folsom became Colorado's head coach before the second game of the 1895 season. The team had no head coach in the season opener, a 42–0 victory over Denver Manual High School.) | 103 | 77 | 23 | 2 | .765 | 39 | 12 | 1 | .760 | — | — | 10 | — |
| 3 | T. C. Mortimer | 1900 | 10 | 6 | 4 | 0 | .600 | 1 | 2 | 0 | .333 | — | — | — | — |
| 4 | Dave Cropp | 1903–1904 | 19 | 14 | 4 | 1 | .763 | 7 | 1 | 0 | .875 | — | — | — | — |
| 5 | Willis Keinholtz | 1905 | 9 | 8 | 1 | 0 | .889 | — | — | — | — | — | — | — | — |
| 6 | Frank Castleman | 1906–1907 | 17 | 7 | 6 | 4 | .529 | 4 | 3 | 2 | .556 | — | — | — | — |
| 7 | Melbourne "Bob" Evans | 1916–1917 | 15 | 7 | 7 | 1 | .500 | 5 | 7 | 0 | .417 | — | — | — | — |
| 8 | Enoch J. Mills | 1918–1919 | 11 | 4 | 6 | 1 | .409 | 3 | 5 | 1 | .389 | — | — | — | — |
| 9 | Myron Witham | 1920–1931 | 96 | 63 | 26 | 7 | .693 | 50 | 20 | 7 | .695 | — | — | 2 | — |
| 10 | William Saunders | 1932–1934 | 24 | 15 | 7 | 2 | .667 | 13 | 7 | 0 | .650 | — | — | 1 | — |
| 11 | Bunny Oakes | 1935–1939 | 41 | 25 | 15 | 1 | .622 | 24 | 6 | 1 | .790 | 0 | 1 | 3 | — |
| 12 | Frank Potts | 1940, 1944–1945 | 25 | 16 | 8 | 1 | .660 | 9 | 2 | 1 | .792 | — | — | — | — |
| 13 | Jim Yeager | 1941–1943, 1946–1947 | 43 | 24 | 17 | 2 | .581 | 16 | 8 | 2 | .654 | — | — | 2 | — |
| 14 | Dallas Ward | 1948–1958 | 110 | 63 | 41 | 6 | .600 | 31 | 29 | 4 | .516 | 1 | 0 | — | — |
| 15 | Sonny Grandelius | 1959–1961 | 31 | 20 | 11 | 0 | .645 | 15 | 5 | 0 | .750 | — | — | 1 | — |
| 16 | Bud Davis | 1962 | 10 | 2 | 8 | 0 | .200 | 1 | 6 | 0 | .143 | 0 | 1 | — | — |
| 17 | Eddie Crowder | 1963–1973 | 118 | 67 | 49 | 2 | .576 | 39 | 37 | 1 | .590 | 3 | 2 | — | — |
| 18 | Bill Mallory | 1974–1978 | 57 | 35 | 21 | 1 | .623 | 18 | 16 | 1 | .529 | 0 | 2 | 1 | — |
| 19 | Chuck Fairbanks | 1979–1981 | 33 | 7 | 26 | 0 | .212 | 5 | 16 | 0 | .238 | — | — | — | — |
| 20 | Bill McCartney^{†} | 1982–1994 | 153 | 93 | 55 | 5 | .624 | 58 | 29 | 4 | .659 | 3 | 6 | 3 | Walter Camp Coach of the Year Award (1989); AFCA Coach of the Year (1989); Paul "Bear" Bryant Award (1989) |
| 21 | Rick Neuheisel | 1995–1998 | 47 | 33 | 14 | 0 | .702 | 19 | 12 | 0 | .613 | 3 | 0 | — | — |
| 22 | Gary Barnett | 1999–2005 | 88 | 49 | 39 | — | .557 | 34 | 22 | — | .607 | 2 | 2 | 1 | Big 12 AP Coach of the Year (2001, 2004) |
| 23 | Dan Hawkins | 2006–2010 | 49 | 16 | 33 | — | .327 | 10 | 22 | — | .313 | 0 | 1 | — | — |
| 24 | Jon Embree | 2011–2012 | 25 | 4 | 21 | — | .160 | 3 | 15 | — | .167 | — | — | — | — |
| 25 | Mike MacIntyre | 2013–2018 | 74 | 30 | 44 | — | .405 | 14 | 39 | — | .264 | 0 | 1 | — | Pac-12 Coach of the Year (2016) Walter Camp Coach of the Year (2016) |
| 26 | Mel Tucker | 2019 | 12 | 5 | 7 | — | .417 | 3 | 6 | — | .333 | — | — | — | |
| 27 | Karl Dorrell | 2020–2022 | 23 | 8 | 15 | — | .348 | 6 | 9 | — | .400 | 0 | 1 | — | |
| 28 | Deion Sanders | 2023–present | 37 | 16 | 21 | — | .432 | 9 | 18 | — | .333 | 0 | 1 | — | |
