= List of Colorado Buffaloes football seasons =

The Colorado Buffaloes football team represents the University of Colorado at Boulder in the Big-12 Conference at the NCAA Division I FBS level in college football. The following are the yearly results, game-by-game yearly results, and detailed bowl results.

== Yearly results ==
Year	Coach	Overall	Conference	Standing	Bowl/playoffs	Coaches^{#}	AP^{°}
Independent (1890–1892)
1890	No coach	0–4					
1891	No coach	1–4					
1892	No coach	3–2					
Colorado Football Association (1893)
1893	No coach	2–3	1–1	2nd			
Harry Heller (Colorado Football Association) (1894)
1894	Harry Heller	8–1	5–0	1st			
Fred Folsom (Colorado Football Association) (1895–1899)
1895	Fred Folsom	5–1	3–0	1st			
1896	Fred Folsom	5–0	2–0	1st			
1897	Fred Folsom	7–1	2–0	1st			
1898	Fred Folsom	4–4	0–2	3rd			
1899	Fred Folsom	7–2	2–1	2nd			
T. W. Mortimer (Colorado Football Association) (1900)
1900	T. W. Mortimer	6–4	1–2	3rd			
Fred Folsom (Colorado Football Association) (1901–1902)
1901	Fred Folsom	5–1–1	2–0	1st			
1902	Fred Folsom	5–1	4–0	1st			
Dave Cropp (Colorado Football Association) (1903–1904)
1903	Dave Cropp	8–2	4–0	1st			
1904	Dave Cropp	6–2–1	3–1	2nd			
Willis Keinholz (Independent) (1905)
1905	Willis Keinholz	8–1					
Frank Castleman (Colorado Football Association) (1906–1907)
1906	Frank Castleman	2–3–4	1–1–2	T–2nd			
1907	Frank Castleman	5–3	2–2	3rd			
Fred Folsom (Colorado Football Association) (1908)
1908	Fred Folsom	5–2	3–0	T–1st			
Fred Folsom (Rocky Mountain Athletic Conference) (1909–1915)
1909	Fred Folsom	6–0	3–0	1st			
1910	Fred Folsom	6–0	3–0	1st			
1911	Fred Folsom	6–0	4–0	1st			
1912	Fred Folsom	6–3	3–2	T–2nd			
1913	Fred Folsom	5–1–1	3–0–1	1st			
1914	Fred Folsom	5–1	4–1	2nd			
1915	Fred Folsom	1–6	0–5	6th			
Bob Evans (Rocky Mountain Athletic Conference) (1916–1917)
1916	Bob Evans	1–5–1	1–5	7th			
1917	Bob Evans	6–2	4–2	3rd			
Enoch J. Mills (Rocky Mountain Athletic Conference) (1918–1919)
1918	Enoch J. Mills	2–3	1–2	T–3rd			
1919	Enoch J. Mills	2–3–1	2–3–1	6th			
Myron Witham (Rocky Mountain Athletic Conference) (1920–1931)
1920	Myron Witham	4–1–2	3–1–2	T–3rd			
1921	Myron Witham	4–1–1	4–0–1	2nd			
1922	Myron Witham	4–4	3–3	T–5th			
1923	Myron Witham	9–0	7–0	1st			
1924	Myron Witham	8–1–1	5–0–1	1st			
1925	Myron Witham	6–3	5–2	4th			
1926	Myron Witham	3–5–1	2–5–1	9th			
1927	Myron Witham	4–5	4–4	T–6th			
1928	Myron Witham	5–1	5–1	2nd			
1929	Myron Witham	5–1–1	4–1–1	T–2nd			
1930	Myron Witham	6–1–1	5–1–1	2nd			
1931	Myron Witham	5–3	3–2	T–4th			
Bill Saunders (Rocky Mountain Athletic Conference) (1932–1934)
1932	Bill Saunders	2–4	2–4	7th			
1933	Bill Saunders	7–2	5–2	4th			
1934	Bill Saunders	6–1–2	6–1	T–1st			
Bunny Oakes (Rocky Mountain Athletic Conference) (1935–1937)
1935	Bunny Oakes	5–4	5–1	1st			
1936	Bunny Oakes	4–3	4–2	4th			
1937	Bunny Oakes	8–1	7–0	1st	L Cotton		17
Bunny Oakes (Mountain States Conference) (1938–1939)
1938	Bunny Oakes	3–4–1	3–2–1	T–2nd			
1939	Bunny Oakes	5–3	5–1	1st			
Frank Potts (Mountain States Conference) (1940)
1940	Frank Potts	5–3–1	4–1–1	T–2nd			
Jim Yeager (Mountain States Conference) (1941–1943)
1941	Jim Yeager	3–4–1	3–2–1	T–4th			
1942	Jim Yeager	7–2	5–1	T–1st			
1943	Jim Yeager	5–2	2–0	1st			
Frank Potts (Mountain States Conference) (1944–1945)
1944	Frank Potts	6–2	2–0	1st			
1945	Frank Potts	5–3	2–1	2nd			
Jim Yeager (Mountain States Conference) (1946–1947)
1946	Jim Yeager	5–4–1	3–2–1	T–4th			
1947	Jim Yeager	4–5	3–3	T–3rd			
Dallas Ward (Big Eight Conference) (1948–1958)
1948	Dallas Ward	3–6	2–3	4th			
1949	Dallas Ward	3–7	1–4	6th			
1950	Dallas Ward	5–4–1	2–4	6th			
1951	Dallas Ward	7–3	5–1	2nd			
1952	Dallas Ward	6–2–2	2–2–2	T–4th			
1953	Dallas Ward	6–4	2–4	T–4th			
1954	Dallas Ward	7–2–1	3–2–1	T–3rd			
1955	Dallas Ward	6–4	3–3	T–3rd			
1956	Dallas Ward	8–2–1	4–1–1	2nd	W Orange	18	20
1957	Dallas Ward	6–3–1	3–3	T–3rd			
1958	Dallas Ward	6–4	4–2	3rd			
Sonny Grandelius (Big Eight Conference) (1959–1961)
1959	Sonny Grandelius	5–5	3–3	T–3rd			
1960	Sonny Grandelius	7–3 (Note: Colorado lost to Kansas but was later awarded win by default due to an ineligible Kansas player (Bert Coan).)	6–1	2nd			
1961	Sonny Grandelius	9–2	7–0	1st	L Orange	7	7
Bud Davis (Big Eight Conference) (1962)
1962	Bud Davis	2–8	1–6	7th			
Eddie Crowder (Big Eight Conference) (1963–1973)
1963	Eddie Crowder	2–8	2–5	6th			
1964	Eddie Crowder	2–8	1–6	7th			
1965	Eddie Crowder	6–2–2	4–2–1	3rd		20	
1966	Eddie Crowder	7–3	5–2	2nd			
1967	Eddie Crowder	9–2	5–2	T–2nd	W Bluebonnet	13	14
1968	Eddie Crowder	4–6	3–4	T–4th			
1969	Eddie Crowder	8–3	5–2	3rd	W Liberty		16
1970	Eddie Crowder	6–5	3–4	4th	L Liberty	16	
1971	Eddie Crowder	10–2	5–2	3rd	W Bluebonnet	7	3
1972	Eddie Crowder	8–4	4–3	T–3rd	L Gator	T–14	16
1973	Eddie Crowder	5–6	2–5	T–6th			
Bill Mallory (Big Eight Conference) (1974–1978)
1974	Bill Mallory	5–6	3–4	5th			
1975	Bill Mallory	9–3	5–2	3rd	L Bluebonnet		16
1976	Bill Mallory	8–4	5–2	T–1st	L Orange	16	16
1977	Bill Mallory	7–3–1	3–3–1	4th			
1978	Bill Mallory	6–5	2–5	7th			
Chuck Fairbanks (Big Eight Conference) (1979–1981)
1979	Chuck Fairbanks	3–8	2–5				
1980	Chuck Fairbanks	1–10	1–6	T–7th			
1981	Chuck Fairbanks	3–8	2–5	7th			
Bill McCartney (Big Eight Conference) (1982–1994)
1982	Bill McCartney	2–8–1	1–5–1	T–6th			
1983	Bill McCartney	4–7	2–5	T–6th			
1984	Bill McCartney	1–10	1–6	7th			
1985	Bill McCartney	7–5	4–3	3rd	L Freedom		
1986	Bill McCartney	6–6	6–1	2nd	L Bluebonnet		
1987	Bill McCartney	7–4	4–3	4th			
1988	Bill McCartney	8–4	4–3	4th	L Freedom		
1989	Bill McCartney	11–1	7–0	1st	L Orange	4	4
1990	Bill McCartney	11–1–1	7–0	1st	W Orange	2	1
1991	Bill McCartney	8–3–1	6–0–1	T–1st	L Blockbuster	20	20
1992	Bill McCartney	9–2–1	5–1–1	2nd	L Fiesta	13	13
1993	Bill McCartney	8–3–1	5–1–1	2nd	W Aloha	16	16
1994	Bill McCartney	11–1	6–1	2nd	W Fiesta	3	3
Rick Neuheisel (Big Eight Conference) (1995)
1995	Rick Neuheisel	10–2	5–2	T–2nd	W Cotton	4	5
Rick Neuheisel (Big 12 Conference) (1996–1998)
1996	Rick Neuheisel	10–2	7–1	2nd (North)	W Holiday	8	8
1997	Rick Neuheisel	5–6	3–5	T–4th (North)			
1998	Rick Neuheisel	8–4	4–4	4th (North)	W Aloha		
Gary Barnett (Big 12 Conference) (1999–2005)
1999	Gary Barnett	7–5	5–3	3rd (North)	W Insight.com		
2000	Gary Barnett	3–8	3–5	4th (North)			
2001	Gary Barnett	10–3	7–1	1st (North)	L Fiesta^{†}	9	9
2002	Gary Barnett	9–5	7–1	1st (North)	L Alamo	21	20
2003	Gary Barnett	5–7	3–5	T–4th (North)			
2004	Gary Barnett	8–5	4–4	1st (North)	W Houston		
2005	Gary Barnett (Note: On December 9, 2005, Barnett was forced to resign and accepted a $3 million buyout. Colorado then went on to play in the Champs Sports Bowl, losing to Clemson. The loss is officially credited to Barnett, even though assistant Mike Hankwitz served as interim head coach for the game.)	7–6	5–3	1st (North)	L Champs Sports		
Dan Hawkins (Big 12 Conference) (2006–2010)
2006	Dan Hawkins	2–10	2–6	5th (North)			
2007	Dan Hawkins	6–7	4–4	3rd (North)	L Independence		
2008	Dan Hawkins	5–7	2–6	T–4th (North)			
2009	Dan Hawkins	3–9	2–6	5th (North)			
2010	Dan Hawkins (Note: Hawkins was fired on November 9 and associate head coach Brian Cabral was promoted to interim coach for the remainder of the season.)	5–7	2–6	5th (North)			
Jon Embree (Pac-12 Conference) (2011–2012)
2011	Jon Embree	3–10	2–7	T–5th (South)			
2012	Jon Embree	1–11	1–8	6th (South)			
Mike MacIntyre (Pac-12 Conference) (2013–2018)
2013	Mike MacIntyre	4–8	1–8	6th (South)			
2014	Mike MacIntyre	2–10	0–9	6th (South)			
2015	Mike MacIntyre	4–9	1–8	6th (South)			
2016	Mike MacIntyre	10–4	8–1	1st (South)	L Alamo	15	17
2017	Mike MacIntyre	5–7	2–7	6th (South)			
2018	Mike MacIntyre (Note: MacIntyre was fired on November 18, the day after the sixth consecutive setback, and was replaced by Kurt Roper for the final game of the season.)	5–7	2–7	6th (South)			
Mel Tucker (Pac-12 Conference) (2019)
2019	Mel Tucker	5–7	3–6	5th (South)			
Karl Dorrell (Pac-12 Conference) (2020–2022)
2020	Karl Dorrell	4–2	3–1	2nd (South)	L Alamo		
2021	Karl Dorrell	4–8	3–6	T–4th (South)			
2022	Karl Dorrell (Note: After losing the first five games of the season, third-year head coach Karl Dorrell and defensive coordinator Chris Wilson were fired on October 2; offensive coordinator Mike Sanford Jr. was named the interim head coach of the Buffaloes for the remainder of the season.)	1–11	1–8	T–11th			
Deion Sanders (Pac-12 Conference) (2023)
2023	Deion Sanders	4–8	1–8	12th			
Deion Sanders (Big 12 Conference) (2024–present)
2024	Deion Sanders	9–4	7–2	T–1st	L Alamo Bowl	25	25
2025	Deion Sanders	3–9	1–8	15th			
Total:		727–552–36					
National championship Conference title Conference division title or championship game berth
^{†}Indicates Bowl Coalition, Bowl Alliance, BCS, or CFP / New Years' Six bowl.; ^{#}Rankings from final Coaches Poll.
