= Embree =

Embree is a surname, and may refer to:

== People ==
- A. S. Embree (1877–1957) (Adolphus Stewart Embree), Canadian-American union organizer and IWW leader
- Ainslie Embree (1921–2017), Canadian Indologist and historian
- Alan Embree (born 1970), American baseball pitcher
- Connor Embree, American football player and coach
- Edwin Embree (1883–1950), American historian and author
- Elihu Embree (1782–1820), American abolitionist and publisher
- Elijah Embree Hoss (1849–1919), American bishop
- Elisha Embree (1801–1863), American politician from Indiana
- John Embree (1908–1950), American anthropologist
- John Embree (American football) (born 1944), American football player
- Jon Embree (born 1965), American football player and coach
- Lauren Embree (born 1991), American tennis player
- Lee Embree (1915–2008), American Army staff sergeant and photographer
- Lester Embree (1938–2017), American philosopher
- Mark Embree, American numerical analyst
- Matthew Embree, American singer and guitarist with Rx Bandits
- Mel Embree (1927–1996), American gridiron football player
- Michelle Embree Ku, American politician
- Red Embree (1917–1996) (Charles Willard Embree), American baseball pitcher
- Taylor Embree (born 1988), American football player and coach
- Vera Embree (1921–2004), American dancer, choreographer and academic

== See also ==
- Embree, Newfoundland and Labrador
- Embree, Garland, Texas
