= Connor Embree =

American football coach

Personal information
- Born: Superior, Colorado, U.S.

Career information
- Position: Halfback
- High school: Blue Valley West (Overland Park, Kansas)
- College: UNLV (2010); Kansas (2011–2013)

Career history
- Blue Valley West HS (KS) (2014) Offensive coordinator; Kansas (2015–2016) Graduate assistant; Fairview HS (CO) (2017) Wide receivers coach; Kansas City Chiefs (2019–2020) Defensive assistant; Kansas City Chiefs (2021–2022) Offensive quality control coach; Kansas City Chiefs (2023–2025) Wide receivers coach

Awards and highlights
- As coach: 3× Super Bowl champion (LIV, LVII, LVIII)

Connor Embree is an American football coach and former player who was most recently the wide receivers coach for the Kansas City Chiefs of the National Football League (NFL). He played college football at UNLV and Kansas.

== College career ==
Embree was a four-year letterman as a halfback and a flanker after playing as a quarterback and free safety in high school. He played at the University of Nevada, Las Vegas in 2010 during his true freshman season, but was ultimately redshirted. He transferred to the University of Kansas where he played from 2011 to 2013. He sat out during his redshirt freshman season in 2011 due to transfer rules. He did not see any game action in 2012. He played in 10 games during the 2013 season where he made 16 punt returns for 182 yards.

== Coaching career ==
=== Blue Valley West High School (Kansas) ===
Embree began his coaching career in 2014 at his alma mater, Blue Valley West High School where he was hired as their offensive coordinator.

=== Kansas ===
Embree was hired as a graduate assistant at the University of Kansas, his alma mater. He worked as a graduate assistant from 2015 to 2016, working with the offense and special teams.

=== Fairview High School (Colorado) ===
Embree was hired as a wide receivers coach at Fairview High School in Boulder, Colorado in 2017.

=== Kansas City Chiefs ===
Embree was hired by the Kansas City Chiefs in 2019 as a defensive assistant. He primarily worked with a linebacking group that accounted for 5.5 sacks and 275 tackles. He also won his first Super Bowl when the Chiefs defeated the San Francisco 49ers 31-20 in Super Bowl LIV. In 2020, he primarily worked with the defensive backs, including Tyrann Mathieu, who led all safeties in the NFL with six interceptions, and rookie, L'Jarius Sneed, who started six games and snagged three interceptions, 2.0 sacks, and seven defended passes.

Embree was elevated in 2021 as an offensive quality control coach. He primarily worked with the wide receivers including, Tyreek Hill, who made a career-high 111 receptions for 1,239 yards leading to his sixth Pro Bowl nomination and Mecole Hardman, who ranked third on the team, recording career-high records of 59 catches and 693 yards. In 2022, he assisted on an offense that led the league with 5,250 receiving yards, 49 receptions and 29.2 points per game. He helped develop a new group of veteran receivers that accounted for over 20% of the Chiefs's receiving touchdowns. He also won his second Super Bowl when the Chiefs defeated the Philadelphia Eagles 38-35 in Super Bowl LVII.

On March 17, 2023, Embree was elevated as the wide receivers coach. He also won his third Super Bowl when the Chiefs again defeated the San Francisco 49ers 25-22 in Super Bowl LVIII.

On January 7, 2026, Embree was fired by the Chiefs after seven seasons with the team.

== Personal life ==
Embree is the son of former Colorado head coach, Jon Embree and grandson of former wide receiver for the Denver Broncos, John Embree. He is also the brother of former UCLA wide receiver, Taylor Embree.
