= Taylor Embree =

American football player and coach (born 1988)

Houston Texans
- Title: Offensive assistant

Personal information
- Born: October 3, 1988 (age 38); Denver, Colorado, U.S.
- Listed height: 6 ft 2 in (1.88 m)
- Listed weight: 202 lb (92 kg)

Career information
- High school: Blue Valley West (Overland Park, Kansas)
- College: UCLA (2008–2011)
- NFL draft: 2012: undrafted

Career history

Playing
- San Diego Chargers (2012)*
- * Offseason or practice squad member only

Coaching
- UNLV (2012) Graduate assistant; UCLA (2013–2014) Graduate assistant; Kansas City Chiefs (2016) Defensive assistant; San Francisco 49ers (2017–2019) Offensive quality control coach; Colorado (2020) Tight ends coach; New York Jets (2021–2023) Running backs coach; New England Patriots (2024) Running backs coach; Houston Texans (2026–present) Offensive assistant

Jon Taylor Embree (born October 3, 1988) is an American football coach and former wide receiver who is an offensive assistant for the Houston Texans of the National Football League (NFL). He played college football at UCLA and was briefly a member of the San Diego Chargers.

== Playing career ==
Taylor played wide receiver for 4 years at UCLA.

Pre-draft measurables
| Height | Weight | 40-yard dash | 10-yard split | 20-yard split | 20-yard shuttle | Three-cone drill | Vertical jump | Broad jump | Bench press |
|---|---|---|---|---|---|---|---|---|---|
| 6 ft 2 1/2 in (1.89 m) | 202 lb (92 kg) | 4.69 s | 1.69 s | 2.75 s | 4.23 s | 7.32 s | 35.5 in (0.90 m) | 10 ft 0 in (3.05 m) | 7 reps |
All values from Pro Day

He was signed as an undrafted free agent by the Chargers in 2012 but was cut at the end of the preseason.

== Coaching career ==
Embree began his coaching career as a graduate assistant at UNLV in 2012, where he was credited for helping convince Jerry Rice Jr. to transfer from UCLA to UNLV for his final season of eligibility. He was also a graduate assistant at his alma mater UCLA for two seasons before joining the Kansas City Chiefs in 2016 as a defensive assistant.

Embree joined the San Francisco 49ers as an offensive quality control coach in 2017, working with his father Jon. He was hired as the tight ends coach at Colorado in 2020, serving on the coaching staff of first-year head coach Karl Dorrell.

Embree was named the running backs coach for the New York Jets in 2021, working under former 49ers defensive coordinator Robert Saleh. According to SNY reports Embree won't return in 2024.

Embree was named the running backs coach for the New England Patriots in 2024, working under Jerod Mayo. Embree was not retained for the 2025 season after Mayo's firing.

== Personal life ==
Embree's father Jon is currently the assistant head coach & tight ends coach for the Miami Dolphins and was the head coach at Colorado for two seasons. His younger brother Connor was previously the wide receivers coach for the Kansas City Chiefs. His grandfather John Embree played two years in the NFL for the Denver Broncos.
