= 1894 Colorado Agricultural football team =

American college football season

1894 Colorado Agricultural football
- Conference: Colorado Football Association
- Record: 0–1 (0–1 CFA)
- Head coach: None
- Home stadium: Campus fields

1894 Colorado Football Association standings
	Conf.					Overall
Team	W		L		T	W		L		T
Colorado $	5	–	0	–	0	8	–	1	–	0
Colorado Mines	1	–	2	–	0	1	–	2	–	0
Denver	1	–	3	–	0	1	–	3	–	0
Colorado College	0	–	1	–	0	1	–	2	–	0
Colorado Agricultural	0	–	1	–	0	0	–	1	–	0
$ – Conference champion

The 1894 Colorado Agricultural football team represented Colorado Agricultural College (now known as Colorado State University) in the Colorado Football Association (CFA) during the 1894 college football season. In its rivalry game with Colorado, played on October 27 in Boulder, the team lost by a 67 to 0 score. The team had no coach.

Colorado Agricultural College President Alston Ellis disbanded the team after one game in the 1894 season. The football program returned upon Ellis' departure from the school in 1899.

== Schedule ==
Date	Opponent	Site	Result	Source
October 27	at Colorado	Boulder, CO (rivalry)	L 0–67	
