= 1894 Colorado Silver and Gold football team =

American college football season

1894 Colorado Silver and Gold football

CFA champion
- Conference: Colorado Football Association
- Record: 8–1 (5–0 CFA)
- Head coach: Harry Heller (1st season)
- Captain: Harry Gamble
- Home stadium: Campus Fields

1894 Colorado Football Association standings
	Conf.					Overall
Team	W		L		T	W		L		T
Colorado $	5	–	0	–	0	8	–	1	–	0
Colorado Mines	1	–	2	–	0	1	–	2	–	0
Denver	1	–	3	–	0	1	–	3	–	0
Colorado College	0	–	1	–	0	1	–	2	–	0
Colorado Agricultural	0	–	1	–	0	0	–	1	–	0
$ – Conference champion

The 1894 Colorado Silver and Gold football team was an American football team that represented the University of Colorado as a member of the Colorado Football Association (CFA) during the 1894 college football season. Led by Harry Heller in his first and only season as head coach, Colorado compiled an overall record of 8–1 with a mark of 5–0 in conference play, winning the CFA title. The season marked the program's first conference championship and first head coach.

== Schedule ==
Date	Opponent	Site	Result
October 6	East High School*	Boulder, CO	W 46–0
October 13	at Denver Athletic Club*	Denver, CO	W 12–4
October 20	Denver	Boulder, CO	W 44–0
October 27	Colorado Agricultural	Boulder, CO (rivalry)	W 67–0
October 31	West High School*	Boulder, CO	W 26–4
November 3	at Denver	Denver, CO	W 49–4
November 6	at Colorado Mines	Golden, CO	W 20–0
November 24	at Denver Athletic Club*	Denver, CO	L 6–20
November 30	Colorado Mines	Boulder, CO	W 18–0
*Non-conference game
