= 1903 Colorado Silver and Gold football team =

American college football season

1903 Colorado Silver and Gold football

CFA champion
- Conference: Colorado Football Association
- Record: 8–2 (4–0 CFA)
- Head coach: Dave Cropp (1st season)
- Captain: Percy Foote
- Home stadium: Gamble Field

1903 Colorado Football Association standings
	Conf.					Overall
Team	W		L		T	W		L		T
Colorado $	4	–	0	–	0	8	–	2	–	0
Colorado Agricultural	3	–	1	–	0	5	–	1	–	0
Colorado Mines	2	–	2	–	0	3	–	4	–	0
Colorado College	1	–	3	–	0	4	–	5	–	0
Denver	0	–	4	–	0	6	–	7	–	0
$ – Conference champion

The 1903 Colorado Silver and Gold football team was an American football team that represented the University of Colorado as a member of the Colorado Football Association (CFA) during the 1903 college football season. Led by first-year head coach Dave Cropp, Colorado compiled an overall record of 8–2 with a mark of 4–0 in conference play, winning the CFA title for the third consecutive season.

== Schedule ==
Date	Opponent	Site	Result	Source
September 26	State Prep School*	Gamble Field; Boulder, CO	W 40–0	
October 3	Utah*	Gamble Field; Boulder, CO (rivalry)	W 22–0	
October 10	Colorado Agricultural	Gamble Field; Boulder, CO (rivalry)	W 5–0	
October 17	Kansas*	Gamble Field; Boulder, CO	L 11–12	
October 24	Nebraska*	Gamble Field; Boulder, CO (rivalry)	L 0–31	
October 31	at Colorado Mines	Athletic Park; Golden, CO	W 17–0	
November 7	at Denver	Denver, CO	W 10–0	
November 14	at Colorado College	Washburn Field; Colorado Springs, CO	W 31–6	
November 21	Missouri Mines*	Gamble Field; Boulder, CO	W 38–0	
December 5	Colorado Mines	Gamble Field; Boulder, CO	W 23–5	
*Non-conference game
