= Vera Embree =

American dancer and choreographer

Vera L. Embree (1921–2004) was an American dancer and choreographer, and the first African American women faculty member in the University of Michigan’s Dance Department. She studied under influential dance instructors including Jose Limon and Alvin Ailey. She was a founder of Contemporary Dance Company in Detroit and co-founder of Our Own Thing, an instructional program in Ann Arbor, Michigan.

== Education ==
Embree was born in 1921 in Muskogee, Oklahoma. She studied ballet as a child in Raleigh, North Carolina. She pursued Modern dance at Palmer Memorial Institute in Greensboro, NC. Embree received a B.S. in Physical Education and English from The Hampton Institute in the early 1940s. There she had the opportunity to study African dance and she joined the Hampton Institute Creative Dance Institute.

Embree's study of dance included time working with Alvin Ailey and Jose Limon.

== Career ==
She began her teaching career at the YWCA in Baltimore, and then at Detroit Central High School where she taught from 1958 until 1967.

She moved to Ann Arbor in 1968 to join the Dance Department, where she was its first African American faculty member. Her work included investigations into the development of African-American dance. She received tenure in 1975 and taught there until she retired in 1986.

Outside the classroom, she choreographed for the University Dance Company in Ann Arbor, Michigan.

She was a co-founder of Our Own Thing, an instructional program in music and the arts for Black youth in Ann Arbor and beyond.

Embree died on July 28th, 2004 from cancer.

== Awards ==
In 1984 Michigan recognized her as a citizen of Michigan deserving of special honor.

She received the Governor's Michigan Artist Award in 1986.
