= Mike MacIntyre =

American football player and coach (born 1965)

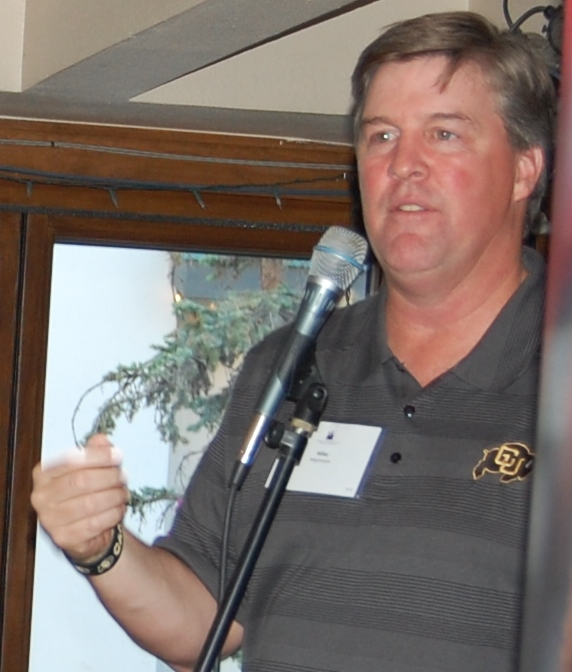
- MacIntyre at a fundraiser in 2013

Current position
- Title: Defensive coordinator
- Team: Oregon State
- Conference: Pac-12

Biographical details
- Born: March 14, 1965 (age 61); Miami, Florida, U.S.

Playing career
- 1984–1985: Vanderbilt
- 1987–1988: Georgia Tech
- Position: Defensive back

Coaching career (HC unless noted)
- 1990–1991: Georgia (GA)
- 1992: Davidson (DC)
- 1992: Plattling Black Hawks
- 1993–1996: UT Martin (DC)
- 1997–1998: Temple (DC)
- 1999–2000: Ole Miss (WR)
- 2001–2002: Ole Miss (DB)
- 2003–2006: Dallas Cowboys (DB)
- 2007: New York Jets (DB)
- 2008–2009: Duke (DC)
- 2010–2012: San Jose State
- 2013–2018: Colorado
- 2019: Ole Miss (DC/S)
- 2020–2021: Memphis (DC)
- 2022–2024: FIU
- 2025: Mississippi State (DA)
- 2026–present: Oregon State (DC/S)

Head coaching record
- Overall: 58–89 (college)
- Bowls: 0–1

Accomplishments and honors

Championships
- 1 Pac-12 South Division (2016)

Awards
- AFCA Assistant Coach of the Year (2009); FCA Grant Teaff National Coach of the Year (2012); Pac-12 Conference Coach of the Year (2016); Walter Camp Coach of the Year (2016); Home Depot Coach of the Year (2016); AP Coach of the Year (2016); Eddie Robinson Coach of the Year Award (2016); Bobby Dodd Coach of the Year Award (2016); CBS Sports Coach of the Year (2016); SB Nation Coach of the Year (2016); AFCA Region 5 Coach of the Year (2016); Get in the Game Impact Award presented by the Maxwell Football Club (2018); Rod Carew Leadership Award (2018)

George Michael MacIntyre (born March 14, 1965) is an American football coach who serves as a defensive coordinator for Oregon State. He previously served as the head football coach at San Jose State, Colorado, and FIU.

MacIntyre began his coaching career in 1990 as a graduate assistant at Georgia. From 1992 to 2002, MacIntyre held various assistant coaching positions at Davidson, UT Martin, Temple, and Ole Miss. From 2003 to 2007, MacIntyre was an assistant coach in the National Football League (NFL), first as defensive backs coach of the Dallas Cowboys from 2003 to 2006 and then in the same position with the New York Jets in 2007. MacIntyre returned to college football as defensive coordinator for Duke from 2008 to 2009. His defenses produced two of the best seasons statistically the Blue Devils had achieved. In 2009, the American Football Coaches Association recognized MacIntyre as FBS Assistant Coach of the Year.

Hired by San Jose State in 2010, MacIntyre became a head coach for the first time in his career. As San Jose State head coach from 2010 to 2012, MacIntyre coached a program that improved from a one-win season in 2010 to a 10–2 record in 2012. San Jose State also earned its first-ever BCS Top 25 ranking and first bowl game invitation since 2006.

At Colorado, MacIntyre led the Buffaloes to the first Pac-12 South Division Championship in school history in 2016. He was named the Pac-12 Coach of the Year and won multiple national awards including Walter Camp Coach of the Year in 2016. However, MacIntyre was fired after the 2018 season, when Colorado started the season 5–0 only to end the season on a seven-game losing streak.

Since then, MacIntyre was a defensive coordinator, first at Ole Miss in 2019 then at Memphis beginning in 2020. He returned to the head coaching ranks from 2022 to 2024, leading Florida International University to three 4-8 seasons. After that, he again became a defensive assistant coach at Mississippi State and then Oregon State.

== Early life ==
Born in 1965 in Miami, Florida, MacIntyre is one of two sons of former football coach George MacIntyre and Betty MacIntyre. The MacIntyre family lived in many places throughout the Southern United States, as his father was a scout for the University of Miami from 1964 to 1967, defensive coordinator of the University of Tampa (Tampa, Florida) in 1968, defensive back coach at Clemson University (Clemson, South Carolina) from 1970 to 1972, and assistant coach for Vanderbilt University (Nashville, Tennessee) from 1973 to 1974. In 1975, George MacIntyre took his first head coaching position with UT Martin and became offensive coordinator for Ole Miss (the University of Mississippi) in 1978. From 1979 to 1985, George MacIntyre was head football coach of Vanderbilt University.

Mike MacIntyre attended Brentwood Academy in Brentwood, Tennessee near Nashville and played quarterback and defensive back on the football team. After graduating from Brentwood in 1984, Mike MacIntyre played college football at Vanderbilt, which was coached by his father, for two seasons as a free safety. After his father resigned, he transferred to Georgia Tech, where MacIntyre earned a bachelor's degree in business management in 1989. For a year after graduating from Georgia Tech, MacIntyre worked as a logistics manager at Micros Systems.

== Coaching career ==
=== Assistant coach (1990–2009) ===
Enrolling at the University of Georgia in 1990, MacIntyre became a graduate assistant with the Georgia Bulldogs football team, a position he held for two seasons, including the 1991 Independence Bowl championship season. At the end of 1991, MacIntyre completed his master's degree in education with an emphasis on sports management. MacIntyre then became a defensive coordinator: at Davidson College (then in Division III) in 1992, During the summers of 1992 and 1993, MacIntyre served as the head coach and offensive coordinator for the Plattling Blackhawks in Germany. He then went on to the University of Tennessee at Martin from 1993 to 1996, and Temple University from 1997 to 1998. (George MacIntyre had been the head coach of UT Martin football from 1975 to 1977.)

From 1999 to 2002, MacIntyre coached at the University of Mississippi (Ole Miss), starting as the wide receiver coach then in 2001 the defensive secondary coach. MacIntyre actively helped recruit Patrick Willis to Ole Miss; Willis would become an All-Pro linebacker in the NFL. Ole Miss won the Independence Bowl in 1999 and 2002 and was the runner-up of the 2000 Music City Bowl. In 2001, Ole Miss ranked fifth nationally in defensive for allowing 161.3 yards per game.

MacIntyre would then spend five seasons in the NFL starting in 2003: as the defensive backs coach of the Dallas Cowboys under Bill Parcells until 2006, then in 2007 in the same position with the New York Jets. In 2008, Mike MacIntyre returned to college football as the defensive coordinator for Duke, and in his first season with Duke, the Blue Devils allowed 67.4 fewer yards and 9.8 fewer points per game than in 2007. His defenses produced two of the best seasons statistically the Blue Devils had achieved. In the 2008 season, the Duke defense allowed the lowest total points per game in 20 seasons and they kept three opponents to less than 10 points (first time Duke had done that since the year 1976). In 2009, the American Football Coaches Association recognized MacIntyre as FBS Assistant Coach of the Year.

=== San Jose State (2010–2012) ===
==== 2010 ====
On December 16, 2009, MacIntyre became the new head coach of the San Jose State Spartans football team, a member of the Western Athletic Conference (WAC), after Dick Tomey retired. The Spartans had just come off a 2–10 record in 2009 and had only three winning seasons since 1993, and athletic director Tom Bowen planned on making a full 85 scholarship athletes available to the football team, as Academic Progress Rate penalties limited yearly scholarships to between 67 and 72.

Local media considered MacIntyre to be a smart hire despite his inexperience as a head coach. MacIntyre has stated that he chose to be the head coach to inspire success in the student-athletes and praised his father George MacIntyre for improving the struggling football programs UT Martin and Vanderbilt as coach. He also planned on dropping the spread offense and expand recruiting rather than rely on junior college transfers. San Jose State completed the 2010 season 1–12. However, MacIntyre expressed optimism that the team would improve in 2011 given that the team would have 85 athletes on scholarship next season.

==== 2011 ====
In 2011, the Spartans finished 5–7. Unlike the previous season in which MacIntyre had only six weeks of recruiting time, MacIntyre had a full term of recruiting. The coach also commented shortly before the first game of 2011 that his players benefited by learning his playbook throughout 2010 despite the one-win season. Then with the longest losing streak of Division I football, the Spartans lost 13 games in a row starting in 2010 until beating New Mexico State on September 24, 2011. San Jose State averaged 190 rushing yards per game by then, a marked improvement from years past. San Jose Mercury News columnist Jon Wilner credited MacIntyre's experience coaching in the SEC, a conference Wilner wrote was "all about running between the tackles."

The next week, San Jose State won its second in a row and ended a 16-game road losing streak with a 38–31 victory over Colorado State; that win marked the first time since 2008 San Jose State won two consecutive games and first non-conference win since 2002. San Jose State's homecoming game on October 14, 2011, was nationally televised as part of ESPN's College Football Friday Primetime, and San Jose State rallied to beat Hawaii 28–27, the team's third win in four games. That win led to speculation that San Jose State would qualify for a bowl game.

==== 2012 ====
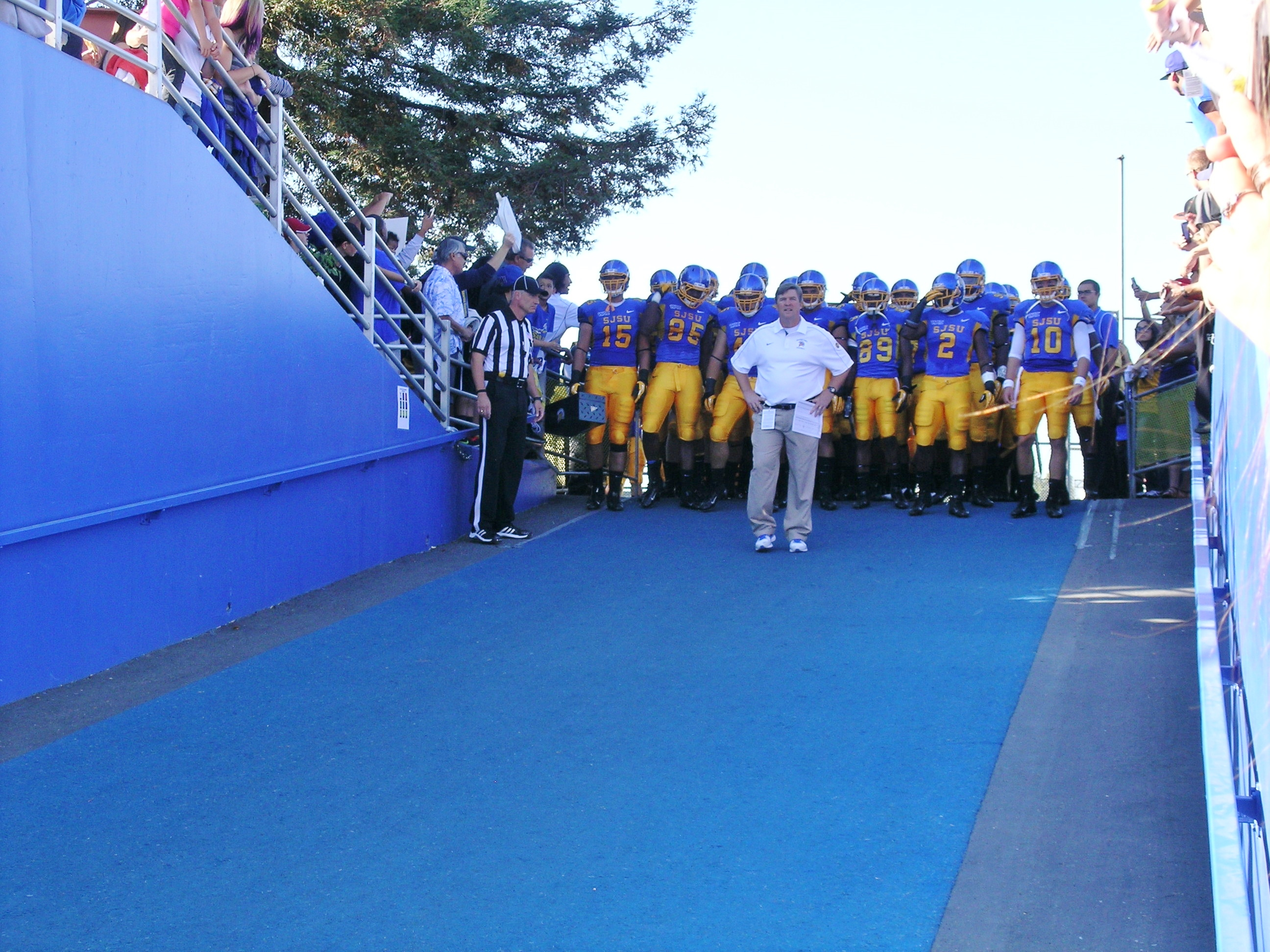
MacIntyre and San Jose State players at Spartan Stadium in September 2012

In January 2012, MacIntyre accepted a contract extension through the 2017 season. Scout.com ranked MacIntyre's 2012 recruiting class the best of the WAC. In July, he speculated that San Jose State could contend for a WAC championship this year. San Jose State began the 2012 season 4–1, the best start since the 2006 New Mexico Bowl championship season (the single loss coming from the 2012 PAC-12 and Rose Bowl Champion Stanford with a final close score of 17–20.) The Spartans finished the regular season with a six-game winning streak and a 10–2 record —only two years removed from a 1–12 season—and for the first time in school history the Spartans earned a final end-of-season BCS ranking (#24). The Spartans also finished the regular season with a #24 ranking in both the AP Poll and the USA Today Coaches Poll. The Spartan offense averaged 42 points per game. In 2012, they broke or tied 36 football records (school records and conference records). In 2012, MacIntyre was recognized by the Fellowship of Christian Athletes with the Grant Teaff National Coach of the Year Award for his San Jose State programs performance on and off the field. MacIntyre made $450,000 per year as head coach of the Spartans.

=== Colorado (2013–2018) ===
On December 10, 2012, the University of Colorado announced that it was hiring MacIntyre to replace coach Jon Embree, who was fired after two seasons. Originally signed to a five-year contract, MacIntyre is the 25th full-time coach for the Colorado Buffaloes football program. On September 2, 2013, MacIntyre won his opening game over Jim McElwain and rival Colorado State on a neutral field at Sports Authority Field at Mile High in Denver. His positivity and decision-making during the game were praised. Coming off a 1–11 season in 2012, Colorado posted a 4–8 record in 2013. On February 20, 2014, the University of Colorado Board of Regents extended MacIntyre's contract through the 2018 season. Colorado then went 2–10 in 2014 and 4–9 in 2015.

Everything came together for Colorado in 2016. On October 22, Colorado became bowl eligible for the first time since 2007 after beating Stanford 10–5. Two weeks later, they clinched their first winning season since 2005 with a 20–10 victory over UCLA. On November 26, 2016, MacIntyre led the Buffaloes to a 27–22 victory over Utah, clinching the first Pac-12 South Division Championship in school history. MacIntyre was named the Pac-12 Coach of the Year for 2016 after the Buffaloes were picked to finish last in the division prior to the season. He was awarded the Walter Camp Coach of the Year Award becoming the second Colorado coach to earn the award, on a team led by his first recruiting class, assembled just weeks after his hire. He was also awarded the ESPN Home Depot Coach of the Year Award, the FWAA/Eddie Robinson Coach of the Year Award, Associated Press (AP) Coach of the Year Award, the CBS Sports Coach of the Year Award, the SB Nation Coach of the Year Award, the 2016 AFCA Region 5 Coach of the Year Award, and the Bobby Dodd Trophy - National Coach of the Year Award. The Bobby Dodd Trophy was given to MacIntyre for his team's on and off the field performance, including their strong academic progress rate and community outreach work. MacIntyre's father, George MacIntyre, previously won the Bobby Dodd Trophy in 1982.

On January 10, 2017, MacIntyre signed a 5-year, $16.25 million contract with Colorado that would have seen him under contract with the Buffaloes through the 2021 season. As it turned out, MacIntyre's tenure in Boulder crested at that point. In 2017, the Buffaloes crumbled to 4–7, including 2–7 in Pac-12 play–a mirror image of the previous season in conference play.

In 2018, the Buffaloes started out the season 5–0 with wins against rivals Colorado State, Nebraska, Arizona State, and UCLA. On November 18, 2018, MacIntyre was fired as the head coach after a six-game losing streak.

=== Ole Miss ===
In December 2018, MacIntyre was named Defensive Coordinator at the University of Mississippi (Ole Miss). The Ole Miss defense improved, holding opponents to less overall points per game and approximately 100 fewer rush yards per game in 2019 than 2018. They moved up significantly in run defense (from No. 116 in 2018 to No. 42 in 2019 for rushing yards per game), in scoring defense (from No. 113 in 2018 to No. 59 in points per game), and held nine teams to under 30 points (having only done so three times the previous year). The Ole Miss total defense improved almost 40 NCAA ranking spots in 2019 compared to 2018. MacIntyre was nominated for the Broyles Award (given to the best assistant coach in the country).

=== Memphis ===
Following the 2019 season, Ole Miss head coach Matt Luke was not retained; MacIntyre briefly took on the duties of head coach in the interim period between Luke's termination and the hiring of Lane Kiffin as head coach. Kiffin did not choose to keep MacIntyre on staff, and in January 2020, MacIntyre was named the defensive coordinator at Memphis.

=== FIU ===
On December 9, 2021, MacIntyre was named FIU's new head coach replacing Butch Davis. FIU fired MacIntyre following the 2024 season.

== Personal life ==
MacIntyre married the former Trisha Rowan in 1989. They have three children, one daughter and two sons. Their eldest son, Jay, played for MacIntyre at Colorado as a slot receiver. Mike MacIntyre is a Christian. In a conversation with the Denver Post about coaching, MacIntyre spoke about his Christian faith by stating, "The way my family and I have been able to do it is through our relationship with Jesus Christ and our faith and to be able to stay positive and realize there's hope." In the same article, MacIntyre's wife, Trisha, said, "Through the process, we've found a rock to stand on. The rock of our faith is what we've learned to stand on, so the waves that come at us from every direction, whether it's good or bad, don't toss us the way they would if we weren't standing on something permanent. And, of course, that is a journey of faith". MacIntyre is involved in the organization of the Fellowship of Christian Athletes. Following the 2012 football season leading San Jose State to a 10-win season and top 25 ranking, he received the Fellowship of Christian Athletes National Coach of the Year Award.

MacIntyre has been involved with Be the Match Registry, at San Jose State and Colorado. The Be the Match Registry connects patients and bone-marrow donors to help save lives. MacIntyre has been responsible for 1,600 registrations leading to eight lives saved. In 2018, Be the Match CEO presented MacIntyre with the Rod Carew Leadership Award. Also in 2018, MacIntyre was presented the Get in the Game Impact Award presented by the Maxwell Football Club for his work with Be the Match Registry. MacIntyre and his wife have also hosted multiple ovarian cancer walk community outreach event to raise money for ovarian cancer research.

== Head coaching record ==
=== College ===
Year	Team	Overall	Conference	Standing	Bowl/playoffs	Coaches^{#}	AP^{°}
San Jose State Spartans (Western Athletic Conference) (2010–2012)
2010	San Jose State	1–12	0–8	9th			
2011	San Jose State	5–7	3–4	T–4th			
2012	San Jose State	10–2	5–1	2nd	Military*	21	21
San Jose State:		16–21	8–13	* Did not coach bowl game			
Colorado Buffaloes (Pac-12 Conference) (2013–2018)
2013	Colorado	4–8	1–8	6th (South)			
2014	Colorado	2–10	0–9	6th (South)			
2015	Colorado	4–9	1–8	6th (South)			
2016	Colorado	10–4	8–1	1st (South)	L Alamo	15	17
2017	Colorado	5–7	2–7	6th (South)			
2018	Colorado	5–6	2–6	6th (South)			
Colorado:		30–44	14–39				
FIU Panthers (Conference USA) (2022–2024)
2022	FIU	4–8	2–6	T–9th			
2023	FIU	4–8	1–7	9th			
2024	FIU	4–8	3–5	T-6th			
FIU:		12–24	6–18				
Total:		58–89					
National championship Conference title Conference division title or championship game berth
^{#}Rankings from final Coaches Poll.; ^{°}Rankings from final AP Poll.
