= Myron E. Witham =

American football player, coach, and mathematician

- Witham from 1932 Colorado yearbook

Biographical details
- Born: October 29, 1880; Pigeon Cove, Massachusetts, U.S.
- Died: March 7, 1973 (aged 92); Burlington, Vermont, U.S.

Playing career

Football
- 1901–1903: Dartmouth
- Position: Quarterback

Coaching career (HC unless noted)

Football
- 1906: Purdue
- 1920–1931: Colorado

Baseball
- 1920–1925: Colorado

Head coaching record
- Overall: 63–31–7 (football); 29–25 (baseball)

Accomplishments and honors

Championships
- Football; 2 RMC (1923–1924)

Awards
- Consensus All-American (1903)

Myron Ellis Witham (October 29, 1880 – March 7, 1973) was an American football player, coach of football and baseball, and mathematics professor. He served as the head football coach at Purdue University in 1906 and at the University of Colorado at Boulder from 1920 to 1931, compiling a career college football record of 63–31–7. He was also the head baseball coach Colorado from 1920 to 1925, tallying a mark of 29–25. Witham was born in Pigeon Cove, Massachusetts, on October 29, 1880. He attended Dartmouth College and was captain of the football team there in 1903. Witham taught mathematics at Purdue, Colorado, the University of Vermont, and Saint Michael's College. He died on March 7, 1973, in Burlington, Vermont.

== Head coaching record ==
=== Football ===
Year	Team	Overall	Conference	Standing
Purdue Boilermakers (Western Conference) (1906)
1906	Purdue	0–5	0–3	8th
Purdue:		0–5	0–3	
Colorado Silver and Gold (Rocky Mountain Conference) (1920–1931)
1920	Colorado	4–1–2	3–1–2	T–3rd
1921	Colorado	4–1–1	4–0–1	2nd
1922	Colorado	4–4	2–3	T–6th
1923	Colorado	9–0	7–0	1st
1924	Colorado	8–1–1	5–0–1	1st
1925	Colorado	6–3	5–2	4th
1926	Colorado	3–5–1	2–5–1	9th
1927	Colorado	4–5	4–4	T–6th
1928	Colorado	5–1	5–1	2nd
1929	Colorado	5–1–1	4–1–1	T–2nd
1930	Colorado	6–1–1	5–1–1	2nd
1931	Colorado	5–3	3–2	T–4th
Colorado:		63–26–7		
Total:		63–31–7		
National championship Conference title Conference division title or championship game berth
