= Bunny Oakes =

American football player and coach, college athletics administrator (1898–1970)

Biographical details
- Born: September 15, 1898; Fort Wayne, Indiana, U.S.
- Died: October 22, 1970 (aged 72) near Lancaster, Pennsylvania, U.S.

Playing career
- 1922–1923: Illinois
- Position: Tackle

Coaching career (HC unless noted)
- 1924–1925: Tennessee (line)
- 1926–1930: Nebraska (line)
- 1931–1934: Montana
- 1935–1939: Colorado
- 1941–1946: Wyoming
- 1947–1948: Grinnell

Administrative career (AD unless noted)
- 1945–1946: Wyoming (interim AD)
- 1947–1949: Grinnell

Head coaching record
- Overall: 43–69–4
- Bowls: 0–1

Accomplishments and honors

Championships
- 2 RMC (1935, 1937); 1 Mountain States (1939)

Bernard F. "Bunny" Oakes (September 15, 1898 – October 22, 1970) was an American football player and coach. He served as the head football coach at the University of Montana (1931–1934), the University of Colorado at Boulder (1935–1939), the University of Wyoming (1941–1946), and Grinnell College (1947–1948), compiling a career college football record of 43–69–4.

== Early life, military service, and playing career ==
Oakes was born September 15, 1898, in Fort Wayne, Indiana. Oakes grew up in the Chicago area and played high school football at Proviso Township High School in Maywood, Illinois. Oakes enlisted in the United States Marine Corps in 1917, and joined the American Expeditionary Forces in France in June 1918. He saw combat action with the 5th Marines in a number of major engagements and was wounded on October 4, 1918. Staying with his unit following the armistice, Oakes played football with the championship 2nd Battalion, 5th Marines team in Germany in 1919. Following the war, Oakes enrolled at the University of Illinois at Urbana–Champaign and played football under coach Bob Zuppke. As a senior at Illinois in 1923, he played on the national championship-winning Fighting Illini football team and participated in the first game at the Memorial Stadium in Champaign, Illinois.

== Coaching career ==
Following graduation from Illinois, Oakes was named the football line coach at the University of Tennessee under head coach M. B. Banks. In 1926, Oakes was named the line coach at the University of Nebraska–Lincoln under Ernest Bearg and later worked under Dana X. Bible. Oakes's first head coaching assignment came in 1931 when he was named as the head football coach at the University of Montana. During his tenure at Montana, Oakes wrote and had published his book, Football Line Play. The book quickly became an important text for coaches and players throughout the country. It was also during this period in his coaching career that he received several patents for football blocking equipment. His dummies were the earliest mobile blocking equipment available to schools and enabled various formations to be simulated.

In 1934, Oakes was named the head football coach at the University of Colorado at Boulder. His teams at Colorado won Rocky Mountain Conference titles during the 1935 and 1937 seasons. The 1937 team, which featured All-American halfback and future justice of the Supreme Court of the United States Byron White, went undefeated in the regular season and played in the 1938 Cotton Bowl Classic, the first bowl game appearance for Colorado. The 1939 Colorado team placed first in the Mountain States Conference. Oakes's record for the five years at Colorado was 25–15–1 with a conference mark of 24–6–1.

Oakes returned to the University of Illinois in 1940, where he earned a Master of Science degree. In April 1941, Oakes took over as the head football coach at the University of Wyoming. With the onset of World War II, intercollegiate athletics were suspended in 1943 and Oakes concentrated on physical training of Army and Navy cadets at the University of Wyoming. Following the war, Oakes resumed his position as head coach for the 1946 season.

Oakes completed his collegiate football coaching career at Grinnell College in Grinnell, Iowa. Assuming duties as head football coach and athletic director at Grinnell in 1947, Oakes completed his coaching career following the 1948 season.

== Death and memorial ==
Oakes died on October 22, 1970, near Lancaster, Pennsylvania of an apparent heart attack while vacationing with his wife. At the 65th Annual Convention of the National Collegiate Athletic Association on January 11, 1971, a memorial resolution commemorating Oakes's distinguished service to athletics was adopted. The Memorial Resolution reads: "For his faithful service to his institution and higher education; his valuable contributions to intercollegiate athletics, and his wholesome influence upon the lives of young men. Be it known that the membership of the National Collegiate Athletic Association, assembled in annual Convention, resolved that this memorial be inscribed in honor and fond remembrance of Bernard F. Oakes."

== Head coaching record ==
Year	Team	Overall	Conference	Standing	Bowl/playoffs	AP^{#}
Montana Grizzlies (Pacific Coast Conference) (1931–1934)
1931	Montana	1–6	0–5	10th		
1932	Montana	2–7	0–5	10th		
1933	Montana	3–4	0–4	10th		
1934	Montana	2–5–1	0–4–1	10th		
Montana:		8–22–1	0–18–1			
Colorado Buffaloes (Rocky Mountain Conference) (1935–1937)
1935	Colorado	5–4	5–1	1st		
1936	Colorado	4–3	4–2	4th		
1937	Colorado	8–1	7–0	1st	L Cotton	17
Colorado Buffaloes (Mountain States Conference) (1938–1939)
1938	Colorado	3–4–1	3–2–1	T–2nd		
1939	Colorado	5–3	5–1	1st		
Colorado:		25–15–1	24–6–1			
Wyoming Cowboys (Mountain States Conference) (1941–1946)
1941	Wyoming	2–7–1	1–5	6th		
1942	Wyoming	3–5	1–5	7th		
1943	No team—World War II					
1944	No team—World War II					
1945	No team—World War II					
1946	Wyoming	1–8–1	0–6	7th		
Wyoming:		6–20–2	2–16			
Grinnell Pioneers (Midwest Conference) (1947–1948)
1947	Grinnell	3–5	3–3	T–4th		
1948	Grinnell	1–7	1–5	8th		
Grinnell:		4–12	4–10			
Total:		43–69–4				
National championship Conference title Conference division title or championship game berth
