= Dave Cropp =

American football and baseball coach (1876–1950)

Biographical details
- Born: July 8, 1876; Dubuque County, Iowa, U.S.
- Died: August 14, 1950 (aged 74)

Coaching career (HC unless noted)

Football
- 1899: Cornell (IA)
- 1901: Dakota University
- 1903–1904: Colorado

Baseball
- 1904–1905: Colorado

Head coaching record
- Overall: 25–6–1 (football); 9–9 (baseball)

Accomplishments and honors

Championships
- Football; 1 Colorado Football Association (1904)

David Bertram Cropp (July 8, 1876 – August 14, 1950) was an American university professor and college football and college baseball coach. He served as the head football coach at Cornell College in Mount Vernon, Iowa in 1899, Dakota University—now known as Dakota Wesleyan University—in Mitchell, South Dakota in 1901, and the University of Colorado—now known as the University of Colorado at Boulder—in 1903 and 1904. Cropp was also the head baseball coach at Colorado in 1904 and 1905, tallying a mark of 9–9. He attended Lenox College in Hopkinton, Iowa and the University of Wisconsin—now known as the University of Wisconsin–Madison.

Cropp married Esther Richard on December 3, 1902, in Mitchell, South Dakota.

== Head coaching record ==
=== Football ===
Year	Team	Overall	Conference	Standing
Cornell Purple (Independent) (1899)
1899	Cornell	5–2		
Cornell:		5–2		
Dakota University (Independent) (1901)
1901	Dakota University	6–0		
Dakota University:		6–0		
Colorado Silver and Gold (Colorado Football Association) (1903–1904)
1903	Colorado	8–2	4–0	1st
1904	Colorado	6–2–1	3–1	2nd
Colorado:		14–4–1	7–1	
Total:		25–6–1		
National championship Conference title Conference division title or championship game berth
