= John Embree (gridiron football) =

American football player (born 1944)

No. 80, 89
- Position: Wide receiver

Personal information
- Born: July 13, 1944 (age 82); St. Louis, Missouri, U.S.
- Listed height: 6 ft 4 in (1.93 m)
- Listed weight: 194 lb (88 kg)

Career information
- High school: Centennial (CA)
- College: Long Beach CC

Career history
- Wheeling/Ohio Valley Ironmen (1966–68); Chicago Bears (1967)*; Minnesota Vikings (1968)*; Denver Broncos (1969–1970); Edmonton Eskimos (1971); Denver Broncos (1972)*; Kansas City Chiefs (1973)*
- * Offseason or practice squad member only

Career NFL statistics
- Games played: 20
- Receptions: 33
- Receiving yards: 519
- Stats at Pro Football Reference

John William Embree (born July 13, 1944) is an American former professional football player who was a wide receiver in three different leagues: in the Continental Football League (COFL) for the Wheeling/Ohio Valley Ironmen (1966–1968), in the National Football League (NFL) for the Denver Broncos (1969–1970), and in the Canadian Football League (CFL) for the Edmonton Eskimos (1971).

== Early life ==
Embree was born in St. Louis in 1944. He played college football for the Long Beach Community College Falcons at the end position in 1965.

== Professional football ==
Embree began his professional football career with the Wheeling Ironmen of the Continental Football League. He played for Wheeling during the 1966 and 1967 seasons and continued with the club when it became the Ohio Valley Ironmen in 1968. He had his best professional seasons in 1967 (37 receptions for 702 yards and eight touchdowns) and 1968 (43 receptions for 762 yards and nine touchdowns).

Embree was signed by the Chicago Bears in 1967 but later released. He signed with the Minnesota Vikings on April 16, 1968, and was released on July 29, 1968. He played for the Denver Broncos in 1969 and 1970. On November 16, 1969, had Denver's longest scoring play of the season on a 79-yard reception against Houston. His best NFL season was 1969 as he appeared in 13 games and tallied 29 receptions for 469 yards and five touchdowns.

He continued his playing career with the Edmonton Eskimos in 1971. He appeared in two games before being released in October 1971.

Embree returned to the NFL with the Broncos in 1972, and with the Kansas City Chiefs in 1973. However, he did not appear in any games for either team.

== Family and later years ==
Embree's son Jon Embree also played in the NFL. His grandson Taylor Embree coached in the NFL.
