= Willis Kienholz =

American football player and coach (1875–1958)

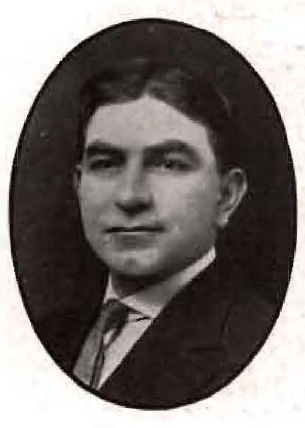
- Kienholz pictured in The Chinook 1911, Washington State yearbook

Biographical details
- Born: October 22, 1875; Kasson, Minnesota, U.S.
- Died: September 20, 1958 (aged 82); Seattle, Washington, U.S.

Playing career
- 1898–1899: Minnesota
- Positions: Halfback, quarterback

Coaching career (HC unless noted)
- 1902: Minnesota (assistant)
- 1902–1903: Lombard
- 1904: North Carolina A&M
- 1905: Colorado
- 1906: North Carolina
- 1907: Auburn
- 1909: Washington State

Head coaching record
- Overall: 26–12–5

Accomplishments and honors

Championships
- 1 Northwest Conference (1909)

William Simmian "Willis" Kienholz (October 10, 1875 – September 20, 1958) was an American college football player and coach. He served one-year stints as the head coach at six different colleges: Lombard College in Galesburg, Illinois (1903), North Carolina College of Agriculture and Mechanic Arts—now North Carolina State University (1904), the University of Colorado at Boulder (1905), University of North Carolina at Chapel Hill (1906), Auburn University (1907), and Washington State University (1909). Kienholz played football at the University of Minnesota in 1898 and 1899.

== Coaching career ==
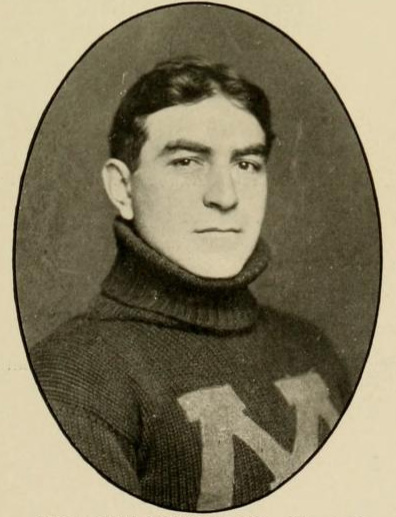
Kienholz pictured in Minnesota attire.

In 1902, Kienholz was an assistant football coach as his alma mater, Minnesota, working under head coach Henry L. Williams. During that season, he was also slated at the head coach at Lombard College in Galesburg, Illinois. The next year he was again the head football coach at Lombard, leading his team to a championship of Illinois colleges.

In 1904, Kienholz coached at North Carolina A&M, and compiled a 3–1–2 record. In 1905, he coached at Colorado, and compiled an 8–1 record. In 1907, he coached at Auburn, and compiled a 6–2–1 record. In 1909, he coached at Washington State, and compiled a 4–1 record.

== Later life and death ==
Kienholz later served as the director of vocational training for the public schools of Los Angeles, California. He died on September 20, 1958, in Seattle, Washington.

== Head coaching record ==
Year	Team	Overall	Conference	Standing
Lombard Olive (Independent) (1903)
1903	Lombard	4–3		
Lombard:		4–3		
North Carolina A&M Aggies (Independent) (1904)
1904	North Carolina A&M	3–1–2		
North Carolina A&M:		3–1–2		
Colorado Silver and Gold (Colorado Football Association) (1905)
1905	Colorado	8–1		
Colorado:		8–1		
North Carolina Tar Heels (Independent) (1906)
1906	North Carolina	1–4–2		
North Carolina:		1–4–2		
Auburn Tigers (Southern Intercollegiate Athletic Association) (1907)
1907	Auburn	6–2–1	3–2–1	T–5th
Auburn:		6–2–1	3–2–1	
Washington State (Northwest Conference) (1909)
1909	Washington State	4–1	2–0	T–1st
Washington State:		4–1	2–0	
Total:		26–12–5		
National championship Conference title Conference division title or championship game berth
