= Walter Camp Coach of the Year Award =

American college football award

Walter Camp Coach of the Year
- Awarded for: Coach of the Year in college football
- Location: Yale University
- Country: United States
- Presented by: Walter Camp Football Foundation

History
- First award: 1967
- Most recent: Curt Cignetti, Indiana
- Website: http://www.waltercamp.org/

The Walter Camp Coach of the Year Award is given annually to the collegiate American football head coach adjudged by a group of National Collegiate Athletic Association (NCAA) Division I Football Bowl Subdivision (FBS) head coaches and sports information directors under the auspices of the Walter Camp Football Foundation as the "Coach of the Year"; the award is named for Walter Camp, a progenitor of the sport. The foundation also honors a Walter Camp Man of the Year for service.

The award has been presented yearly since 1967 during the Walter Camp Football Foundation's annual awards weekend, held on the campus of Yale University.

== Winners ==
| Season | Coach | School |
|---|---|---|
| 1967 | John Pont | Indiana |
| 1968 | Woody Hayes | Ohio State |
| 1969 | Bo Schembechler | Michigan |
| 1970 | Bob Blackman | Dartmouth |
| 1971 | Bob Devaney | Nebraska |
| 1972 | Joe Paterno | Penn State |
| 1973 | Johnny Majors | Pittsburgh |
| 1974 | Barry Switzer | Oklahoma |
| 1975 | Frank Kush | Arizona State |
| 1976 | Frank R. Burns | Rutgers |
| 1977 | Lou Holtz | Arkansas |
| 1978 | Warren Powers | Missouri |
| 1979 | John Mackovic | Wake Forest |
| 1980 | Vince Dooley | Georgia |
| 1981 | Jackie Sherrill | Pittsburgh |
| 1982 | Jerry Stovall | LSU |
| 1983 | Mike White | Illinois |
| 1984 | Joe Morrison | South Carolina |
| 1985 | Fisher DeBerry | Air Force |
| 1986 | Jimmy Johnson | Miami (FL) |
| 1987 | Dick MacPherson | Syracuse |
| 1988 | Don Nehlen | West Virginia |
| 1989 | Bill McCartney | Colorado |
| 1990 | Bobby Ross | Georgia Tech |
| 1991 | Bobby Bowden | Florida State |
| 1992 | Gene Stallings | Alabama |
| 1993 | Terry Bowden | Auburn |
| 1994 | Joe Paterno (2) | Penn State |
| 1995 | Gary Barnett | Northwestern |
| 1996 | Bruce Snyder | Arizona State |
| 1997 | Lloyd Carr | Michigan |
| 1998 | Bill Snyder | Kansas State |
| 1999 | Frank Beamer | Virginia Tech |
| 2000 | Bob Stoops | Oklahoma |
| 2001 | Ralph Friedgen | Maryland |
| 2002 | Kirk Ferentz | Iowa |
| 2003 | Bob Stoops (2) | Oklahoma |
| 2004 | Tommy Tuberville | Auburn |
| 2005 | Joe Paterno (3) | Penn State |
| 2006 | Greg Schiano | Rutgers |
| 2007 | Mark Mangino | Kansas |
| 2008 | Nick Saban | Alabama |
| 2009 | Gary Patterson | TCU |
| 2010 | Chip Kelly | Oregon |
| 2011 | Les Miles | LSU |
| 2012 | Brian Kelly | Notre Dame |
| 2013 | David Cutcliffe | Duke |
| 2014 | Gary Patterson (2) | TCU |
| 2015 | Dabo Swinney | Clemson |
| 2016 | Mike MacIntyre | Colorado |
| 2017 | Mark Richt | Miami (FL) |
| 2018 | Nick Saban (2) | Alabama |
| 2019 | Ed Orgeron | LSU |
| 2020 | Jamey Chadwell | Coastal Carolina |
| 2021 | Luke Fickell | Cincinnati |
| 2022 | Sonny Dykes | TCU |
| 2023 | Kalen DeBoer | Washington |
| 2024 | Curt Cignetti | Indiana |
| 2025 | Curt Cignetti (2) | Indiana |
