= Colorado Buffaloes football =

Football team of University of Colorado Boulder

2026 Colorado Buffaloes football team
- First season: 1890; 136 years ago
- Athletic director: Fernando Lovo
- Head coach: Deion Sanders; 4th season, 20–28 (.417)
- Location: Boulder, Colorado
- Stadium: Folsom Field (capacity: 50,183)
- NCAA division: Division I FBS
- Conference: Big 12
- Colors: Silver, black, and gold
- All-time record: 736–558–36 (.567)
- Bowl record: 12–19 (.387)

National championships
- Claimed: 1990

Conference championships
- CFA: 1894, 1895, 1896, 1897, 1901, 1902, 1903 RMAC: 1909, 1910, 1911, 1913, 1923, 1924, 1934, 1935, 1937 Big Seven: 1939, 1942, 1943, 1944 Big Eight: 1961, 1976, 1989, 1990, 1991 Big 12: 2001

Division championships
- Big 12 North: 2001, 2002, 2004, 2005 Pac-12 South: 2016
- Heisman winners: Rashaan Salaam – 1994; Travis Hunter – 2024
- Consensus All-Americans: 32 (6 unanimous)
- Rivalries: Colorado State (rivalry); Kansas State (rivalry); Nebraska (rivalry); Utah (rivalry)

Uniforms
- Fight song: Fight CU
- Mascot: Ralphie
- Marching band: Golden Buffalo Marching Band
- Outfitter: Nike
- Website: cubuffs.com/football

The Colorado Buffaloes football program represents the University of Colorado Boulder in college football at the NCAA Division I FBS level, and is a member of the Big 12 Conference.

The team was a charter member of the Big 12 before leaving to join the Pac-12 Conference after the 2010 season. After 13 seasons in the Pac-12, the team returned to the Big 12 in 2024. Before joining the Big 12, they were members of the Big Eight Conference.

The team has played at Folsom Field in Boulder, Colorado since 1924. Their all-time record is 735–556–36 (.577 winning percentage) as of the 2025 season. Colorado won the 1990 National Championship that was shared by Georgia Tech. The team is 27th on the all-time win list and 40th in all-time winning percentage, along with two Heisman Trophy winners, Rashaan Salaam in 1994 and Travis Hunter in 2024.

== History ==
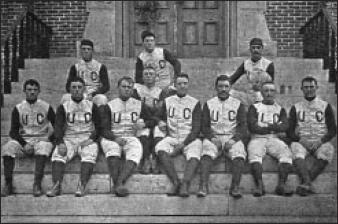
Colorado's first Football Team in 1890.

Beginning in 1890, the Buffaloes have appeared in 29 bowl games (36th all-time), and won 27 conference championships, 5 division championships and an AP national championship in 1990.

Folsom Field was built in 1924, and since then, Colorado has a 308–169–14 record at home through the 2016 season. The road game against the Nebraska Cornhuskers on November 24, 2006, was Colorado's 1,100th football game. The game on September 12, 2015, against Massachusetts was the school's 1,200th football game. In 1994, the Buffaloes had their first Heisman winner, being Rashaan Salaam. Then 30 years later, Travis Hunter (later nicknamed the Unicorn) became CU's second Heisman winner. He was famous for playing both offense and defense, WR and CB. He was the first defensive player to win the award since Charles Woodson.

== Conference affiliations ==
- Independent (1890–1892, 1905)
- Colorado Football Association (1893–1904, 1906–1908)
- Colorado Faculty Athletic Conference/Rocky Mountain Faculty Athletic Conference (1909–1937)
- Mountain States Conference (1938–1947)
- Big Eight Conference (1948–1995)
- Big 12 Conference (1996–2010, 2024–present)
- Pac-12 Conference (2011–2023)

== Championships ==
=== National championships ===
Colorado won one national championship in football for 1990.

Season	Coach	Selectors	Record	Bowl	Result	Final AP	Final Coaches
1990	Bill McCartney	AP, Berryman, Billingsley, DeVold, FACT, FB News, Football Research, FW, Matthews, NCF, NFF, Sporting News, USA/CNN	11–1–1	Orange	W 10–9	No. 1	No. 2

1990 season

Colorado won the national championship in 1990 under the direction of head coach Bill McCartney, who helmed the team from 1982 to 1994. While the Georgia Tech won the United Press International Coaches Poll, Colorado won the Associated Press, Football Writers Association of America and other polls. Colorado played the most difficult schedule in the country, beat more ranked teams and conference champions. Colorado capped the season with a 10–9 win over Notre Dame in the Orange Bowl, a rematch of the 1989 season Orange Bowl Game which Notre Dame won 21–6. Colorado's tie came against Tennessee, who was ranked No. 8, the first week of the season when Colorado was ranked No. 5. The second week gave the Buffs a scare, scoring with 12 seconds left in the game on a 4th and Goal attempt. The next week gave Colorado its only loss of the season, losing 23–22 to Illinois and dropping Colorado to No. 20 in the polls. Colorado then went on to beat teams ranked (at the time) No. 22 Texas, No. 12 Washington, No. 22 Oklahoma, and No. 3 Nebraska. They ended the season 7–0 in the Big Eight Conference for the second straight season. They then capped the season with a win over Notre Dame who were number 1 until a loss in their second to last game of the regular season.

=== Conference championships ===
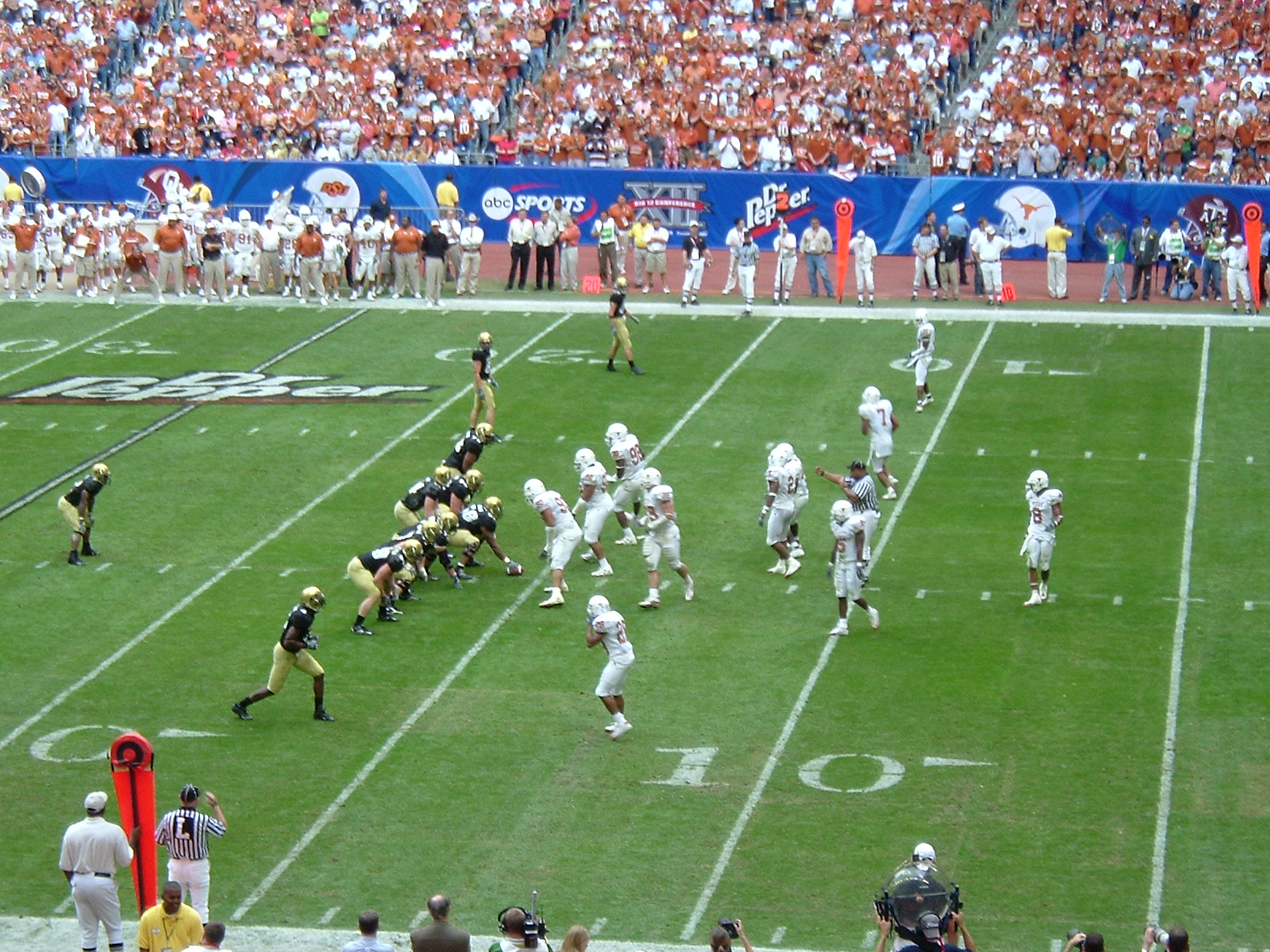
Colorado lines up on offense in the 2005 Big 12 Championship against Texas

Colorado has won 26 conference championships in over a century of college play, spanning through five conferences.

Year	Conference	Coach	Overall record	Conference record
1894	Colorado Football Association	Harry Heller	8–1	5–0
1895	Colorado Football Association	Fred Folsom	5–1	3–0
1896	Colorado Football Association	Fred Folsom	5–0	2–0
1897	Colorado Football Association	Fred Folsom	7–1	2–0
1901	Colorado Football Association	Fred Folsom	5–1–1	2–0
1902	Colorado Football Association	Fred Folsom	5–1	4–0
1903	Colorado Football Association	Dave Cropp	8–2	4–0
1909	Rocky Mountain Athletic Conference	Fred Folsom	6–0	3–0
1910	Rocky Mountain Athletic Conference	Fred Folsom	6–0	3–0
1911	Rocky Mountain Athletic Conference	Fred Folsom	6–0	4–0
1913	Rocky Mountain Athletic Conference	Fred Folsom	5–1–1	3–0–1
1923	Rocky Mountain Athletic Conference	Myron E. Witham	9–0	7–0
1924	Rocky Mountain Athletic Conference	Myron E. Witham	8–1–1	5–0–1
1934	Rocky Mountain Athletic Conference	Bill Saunders	6–1–2	6–1
1935	Rocky Mountain Athletic Conference	Bunny Oakes	5–4	5–1
1937	Rocky Mountain Athletic Conference	Bunny Oakes	8–1	7–0
1939	Mountain States Conference	Bunny Oakes	5–3	5–1
1942	Mountain States Conference	James J. Yeager	7–2	5–1
1943	Mountain States Conference	James J. Yeager	5–2	2–0
1944	Mountain States Conference	Frank Potts	6–2	2–0
1961	Big Eight Conference	Sonny Grandelius	9–2	7–0
1976†	Big Eight Conference	Bill Mallory	8–4	5–2
1989	Big Eight Conference	Bill McCartney	11–1	7–0
1990	Big Eight Conference	Bill McCartney	11–1–1	7–0
1991†	Big Eight Conference	Bill McCartney	8–3–1	6–0–1
2001	Big 12 Conference	Gary Barnett	10–3	7–1

† Co-champions

=== Division championships ===
Year	Division	Coach	Opponent	CG result
2001†	Big 12 North	Gary Barnett	Texas	W 39–37
2002	Big 12 North	Gary Barnett	Oklahoma	L 7–29
2004†	Big 12 North	Gary Barnett	Oklahoma	L 3–42
2005	Big 12 North	Gary Barnett	Texas	L 3–70
2016	Pac-12 South	Mike MacIntyre	Washington	L 10–41

† Co-champions

== Head coaches ==
The Buffaloes have played in 1,109 games during their 125 seasons, through 2014. In those seasons, 11 coaches have led Colorado to postseason bowl games: Bunny Oakes, Dallas Ward, Marcel M. Mazur, Bud Davis, Eddie Crowder, Bill Mallory, Bill McCartney, Rick Neuheisel, Gary Barnett, Dan Hawkins, Mike MacIntyre and Karl Dorrell. Ten coaches have won conference championships with the Buffaloes: Fred Folsom, Myron Witham, William Saunders, Oakes, Jim Yeager, Sonny Grandelius, Mallory, McCartney and Barnett. The Buffaloes won the national championship in 1990, and have won a total of 28 conference championships.

McCartney is the all-time leader in games coached with 153, total wins with 93, and conference wins with 58. Folsom had the longest tenure as head coach, remaining in the position for 15 seasons. Harry Heller and Willis Keinholtz are tied for the highest overall winning percentage. Each served a single season and won eight of his nine games for a winning percentage of .889. Of coaches who served more than one season, Folsom leads with a .765 winning percentage. Davis, in terms of overall winning percentage, is the worst coach the Buffaloes have had with a .200 winning percentage. No Colorado coach has been inducted into the College Football Hall of Fame, although McCartney was inducted into the Orange Bowl Hall of Fame in 1996.

Mike MacIntyre had brief success with the program. Hired on Dec. 10, 2012, MacIntyre compiled a 30–44 record over five-plus seasons at Colorado. In 2016, MacIntyre lead Colorado to a 10–2 regular season and a trip to the Pac-12 Championship Game. It was the first winning season for Colorado since 2005, ending a 10-year streak of finishing below .500. 2016 was also the best season for the Buffaloes since 2001. As well, it marked their first time playing in a conference championship game since the 2005 Big 12 Championship Game. The team also went 8–2 in the Pac-12 after having five conference wins in the previous five seasons. Mike MacIntyre was named the Walter Camp 2016 Coach of the Year by the Walter Camp Foundation, the second Colorado football coach to earn the honor (Bill McCartney in 1989). MacIntyre was also awarded the 2016 Pac-12 Coach of the Year, American Football Coaches Association's coach of the year and comeback coach of the year awards, the Associated Press coach of the year, and the Eddie Robinson coach of the year by the Football Writers Association of America. In 2018, the Buffaloes started out the season 5–0 with wins against rivals Colorado State, Nebraska, Arizona State, and UCLA - however, MacIntyre was fired as the head coach on November 18, 2018, after a six-game losing streak.

Mike Sanford was named interim Head Coach after Karl Dorrell was fired during the 2022 season, Sanford was previously the Buffaloes Offensive Coordinator for the start of the 2022 campaign. On December 3, Colorado announced Deion Sanders as Head Football Coach.

== Venues ==
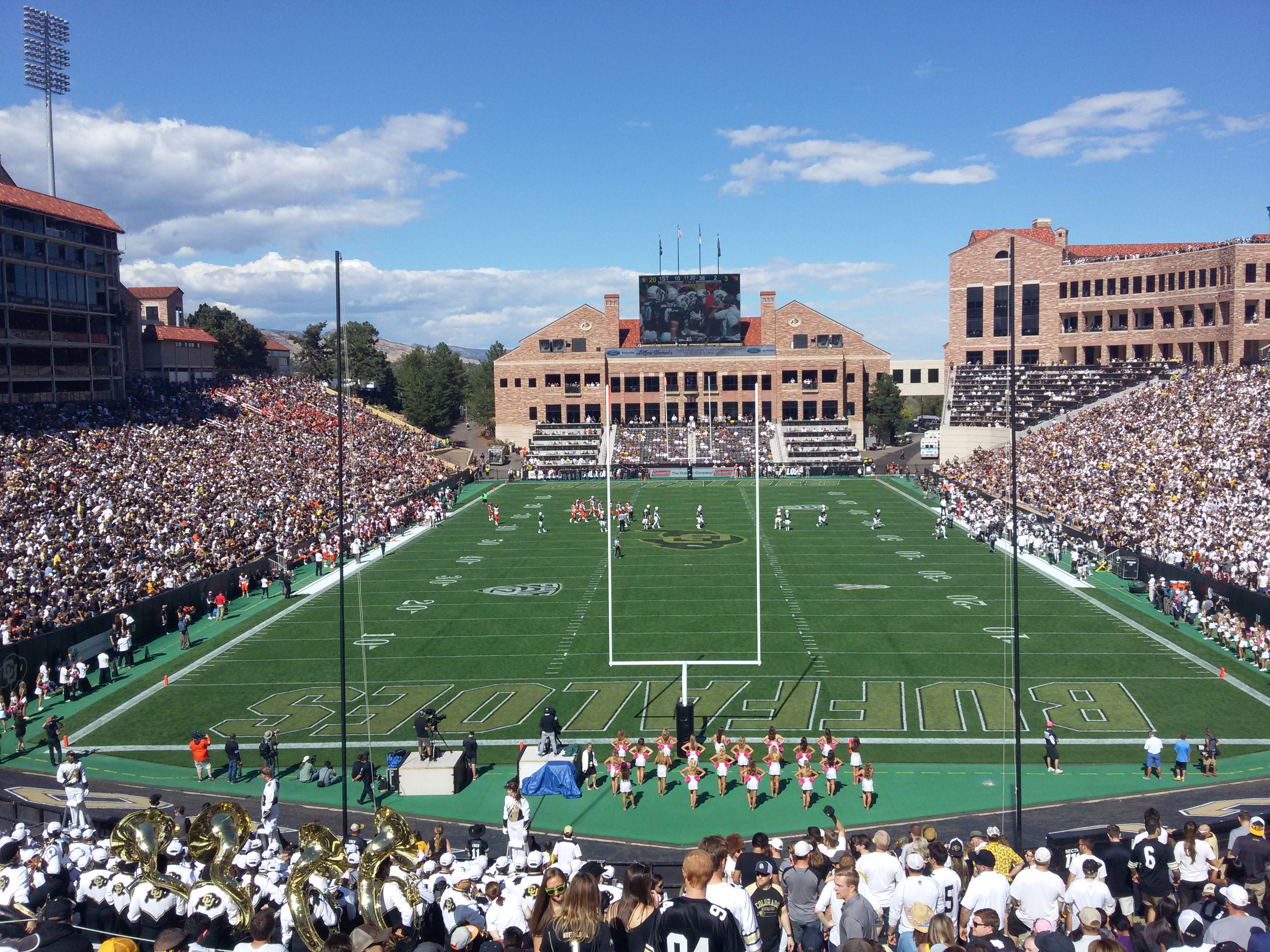
Folsom Field

- Campus fields (1890–1901)
- Gamble Field (1901–1924)
- Folsom Field (1924–present)

== Rivalries ==
=== Nebraska ===
A traditional college football rivalry with the Nebraska Cornhuskers restarted in the 1980s (many historical documents show the importance of this game going back to 1898) when Bill McCartney declared the conference opponent to be their rival. His theory was since Nebraska was such a powerhouse team, if Colorado was able to beat them then they would be a good team. Colorado began to repeatedly threaten Nebraska in the late 1980s, following their win over the Huskers in 1986, and then surpassed the Huskers for the Big 8 crown in 1989.

In 1990, Colorado beat Nebraska 27–12 in Lincoln for the first time since 1967, en route to their first national title. From 1996 to 2000, the series was extremely competitive, with the margin of victory by NU in those five years being only 15 points combined. The rivalry was further buoyed by the introduction of the Big 12 Conference in 1996, which moved Oklahoma and Oklahoma State to the southern division with the four new schools from Texas, formerly in the Southwest Conference. Nebraska had traditionally finished the Big 8 conference schedule with a rivalry game with Oklahoma, but the two were now in different divisions, which meant they met every other year in the regular season. Colorado replaced Oklahoma as Nebraska's final conference game of the regular season, which further intensified the rivalry. In 2001 No. 1 Nebraska came to Folsom Field undefeated and left at the short end of a nationally televised 62–36 blowout. Both teams departed the Big 12 in 2011, as NU headed east to join the Big Ten and the future of the rivalry was in doubt. On February 7, 2013, Colorado and Nebraska agreed to renew the rivalry. Colorado traveled to Lincoln in 2018 and won 33–28 (winning against Nebraska for the first time since 2007 and the first time in Lincoln since 2004). On September 7, 2019, Colorado mounted an improbable comeback after being down 17–0 at half, to win the game in overtime, 34–31. After a 3-year break, Nebraska lost 36–14 to Colorado in Boulder in 2023, but then won against Colorado 28–10 in 2024. Nebraska leads the series 50–21–2 through the 2024 season.

=== Colorado State ===
Colorado's in-state rival is the Colorado State Rams of the PAC-12 Conference, located north of Boulder in Fort Collins. The two schools are separated by 45 miles (72 km) and both consider it important and noteworthy to beat the other for bragging rights for the next year. The two football teams annually compete in the Rocky Mountain Showdown for the Centennial Cup, played in Denver, Fort Collins, and Boulder. The trophy takes its name from the state of Colorado's nickname of "The Centennial State". The Buffaloes lead the series 69–22–2 through the 2025 season. The next scheduled game is not until 2029 in Fort Collins on September 15.

=== Utah ===
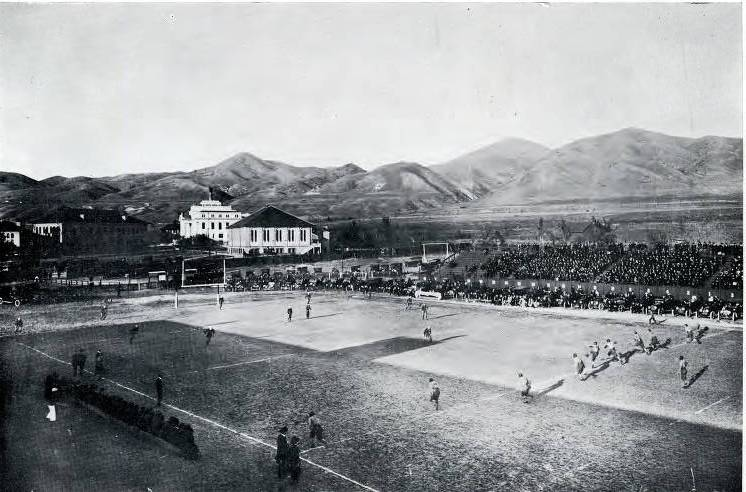
Kickoff at the 1916 Utah vs. Colorado game

The rivalry with Utah ran from 1903 to 1962, in which Utah and Colorado played each other nearly every year; through 1962 they had met 57 times. At the time, it was the second-most played rivalry for both teams (Utah had played Utah State 62 times; Colorado had played Colorado State 61 times). The rivalry was dormant until 2011, when both teams joined the Pac-12, renewing the rivalry on an annual basis. The Colorado–Utah rivalry remains the fifth-most played rivalry in Utah's history, and eighth-most in Colorado's history. Utah leads the series 36-33-3 through the 2025 season.

== Bowl games ==
Colorado has participated in 31 bowl games, with a record of 12–19 (.387).

Season	Coach	Bowl	Opponent	Result	Attendance	Network
1937	Bunny Oakes	Cotton	Rice	L 14–28	35,000	—
1956	Dallas Ward	Orange	Clemson	W 27–21	72,552	CBS
1961	Sonny Grandelius	Orange	LSU	L 7–25	62,391	ABC
1967	Eddie Crowder	Bluebonnet	Miami (FL)	W 31–21	30,156	ABC
1969	Eddie Crowder	Liberty	Alabama	W 47–33	50,144	ABC
1970	Eddie Crowder	Liberty	Tulane	L 3–17	44,500	ABC
1971	Eddie Crowder	Astro-Bluebonnet	Houston	W 29–17	54,720	ABC
1972	Eddie Crowder	Gator	Auburn	L 3–24	71,114	ABC
1975	Bill Mallory	Astro-Bluebonnet	Texas	L 21–38	52,728	ABC
1976	Bill Mallory	Orange	Ohio State	L 10–27	65,537	NBC
1985	Bill McCartney	Freedom	Washington	L 17–20	30,961	Lorimar
1986	Bill McCartney	Bluebonnet	Baylor	L 9–21	40,470	Raycom
1988	Bill McCartney	Freedom	Brigham Young	L 17–20	35,941	Raycom
1989	Bill McCartney	Orange	Notre Dame	L 6–21	81,191	NBC
1990	Bill McCartney	Orange	Notre Dame	W 10–9	77,062	NBC
1991	Bill McCartney	Blockbuster	Alabama	L 25–30	52,644	CBS
1992	Bill McCartney	Fiesta	Syracuse	L 22–26	70,224	NBC
1993	Bill McCartney	Aloha	Fresno State	W 41–30	44,009	ABC
1994	Bill McCartney	Fiesta	Notre Dame	W 41–24	73,968	NBC
1995	Rick Neuheisel	Cotton	Oregon	W 38–6	58,214	CBS
1996	Rick Neuheisel	Holiday	Washington	W 33–21	54,749	ESPN
1998	Rick Neuheisel	Aloha	Oregon	W 51–43	34,803	ABC
1999	Gary Barnett	Insight.com	Boston College	W 62–28	35,762	ESPN
2001	Gary Barnett	Fiesta	Oregon	L 16–38	74,118	ABC
2002	Gary Barnett	Alamo	Wisconsin	L 28–31^{OT}	50,690	ESPN
2004	Gary Barnett	Houston	UTEP	W 33–28	27,235	ESPN
2005	Mike Hankwitz	Champs Sports	Clemson	L 10–19	31,470	ESPN
2007	Dan Hawkins	Independence	Alabama	L 24–30	47,043	ESPN
2016	Mike MacIntyre	Alamo	Oklahoma State	L 8–38	59,815	ESPN
2020	Karl Dorrell	Alamo	Texas	L 23–55	10,822	ESPN
2024	Deion Sanders	Alamo	BYU	L 14–36	64,261	ABC

== Notable players ==
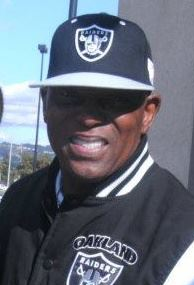
Cliff Branch, Hall of Fame WR

- Dick Anderson
- Bobby Anderson
- Troy Archer
- Tom Ashworth
- Chidobe Awuzie
- David Bakhtiari
- Estes Banks
- Marlon Barnes
- Brad Bedell
- Mitch Berger
- Frank Bernardi
- Tony Berti
- Greg Biekert
- Eric Bieniemy
- Jeremy Bloom
- Frank Bosch
- Ronnie Bradford
- Cliff Branch
- Tyler Brayton
- Paul Briggs
- Pete Brock
- Stan Brock
- Tom Brookshier
- Chad Brown
- Chris Brown
- Jalil Brown
- Bill Brundige
- Larry Brunson
- Cullen Bryant
- Brian Cabral
- J.V. Cain
- Brian Calhoun
- Gary Campbell
- Jeff Campbell
- Rae Carruth
- Darrin Chiaverini
- Franklin Clarke
- Shannon Clavelle
- Mark Cooney
- Eric Coyle
- Claude Crabb
- Ken Crawley
- Mason Crosby
- T. J. Cunningham
- Brian Daniels
- Charlie Davis
- Mike Davis
- John Denvir
- Koy Detmer
- Tyson DeVree
- Jordon Dizon
- Jeff Donaldson
- Eddie Dove
- Boyd Dowler
- Justin Drescher
- Jon Embree
- Christian Fauria
- Mark Fenton
- Deon Figures
- Bill Frank
- Joe Garten
- Daniel Graham
- Charlie Greer
- Dan Grimm
- Andre Gurode
- D.J. Hackett
- Darian Hagan
- Carroll Hardy
- Don Hasselbeck
- Dennis Havig
- Mark Haynes
- Cody Hawkins
- Ralph Heck
- Barry Helton
- Jerry Hillebrand
- Merwin Hodel
- Darius Holland
- Greg Horton
- Travis Hunter
- Hale Irwin
- Heath Irwin
- Brian Iwuh
- Charles Johnson
- Charlie Johnson
- Ken Johnson
- Richard Johnson
- Sam Rogers
- Ted Johnson
- Brad Jones
- Fred Jones
- Greg Jones
- Vance Joseph
- Ben Kelly
- Jon Keyworth
- Joe Klopfenstein
- Gary Knafelc
- Mark Koncar
- Mike Kozlowski
- Terry Kunz
- Jay Leeuwenburg
- Matt Lepsis
- Michael Lewis
- Phillip Lindsay
- Dave Logan
- Wayne Lucier
- Vaka Manupuna
- Bo Matthews
- Matt McChesney
- Dave McCloughan
- Mike McCoy
- Kanavis McGhee
- Odis McKinney
- Scotty McKnight
- Ron Merkerson
- Matt Miller
- Mike Montler
- Emery Moorehead
- Chris Naeole
- Garry Howe
- Chris Hudson
- Hannibal Navies
- Erik Norgard
- Gabe Nyenhuis
- Herb Orvis
- Whitney Paul
- Rod Perry
- Tyler Polumbus
- Mike Pritchard
- Mickey Pruitt
- Vince Rafferty
- Tony Reed
- Leonard Renfro
- Paul Richardson
- Sam Rogers
- Tom Rouen
- Lee Rouson
- Matt Russell
- Rashaan Salaam
- Shedeur Sanders
- Victor Scott
- Jimmy Smith
- Nate Solder
- Ariel Solomon
- Nelson Spruce
- John Stearns
- Kordell Stewart
- Donald Strickland
- Quinn Sypniewski
- Sean Tufts
- Lawrence Vickers
- Thaddaeus Washington
- Michael Westbrook
- Byron White
- Sam Wilder
- Alfred Williams

=== Currently active in the NFL ===
- Chidobe Awuzie
- B. J. Green
- Jimmy Horn Jr.
- Travis Hunter
- Nate Landman
- Derrick McLendon
- Isaiah Oliver
- Brady Russell
- Shedeur Sanders
- Laviska Shenault
- Will Sheppard
- Will Sherman
- Cam'Ron Silmon-Craig
- Josh Tupou
- Xavier Weaver
- LaJohntay Wester
- Juwann Winfree

== Awards ==
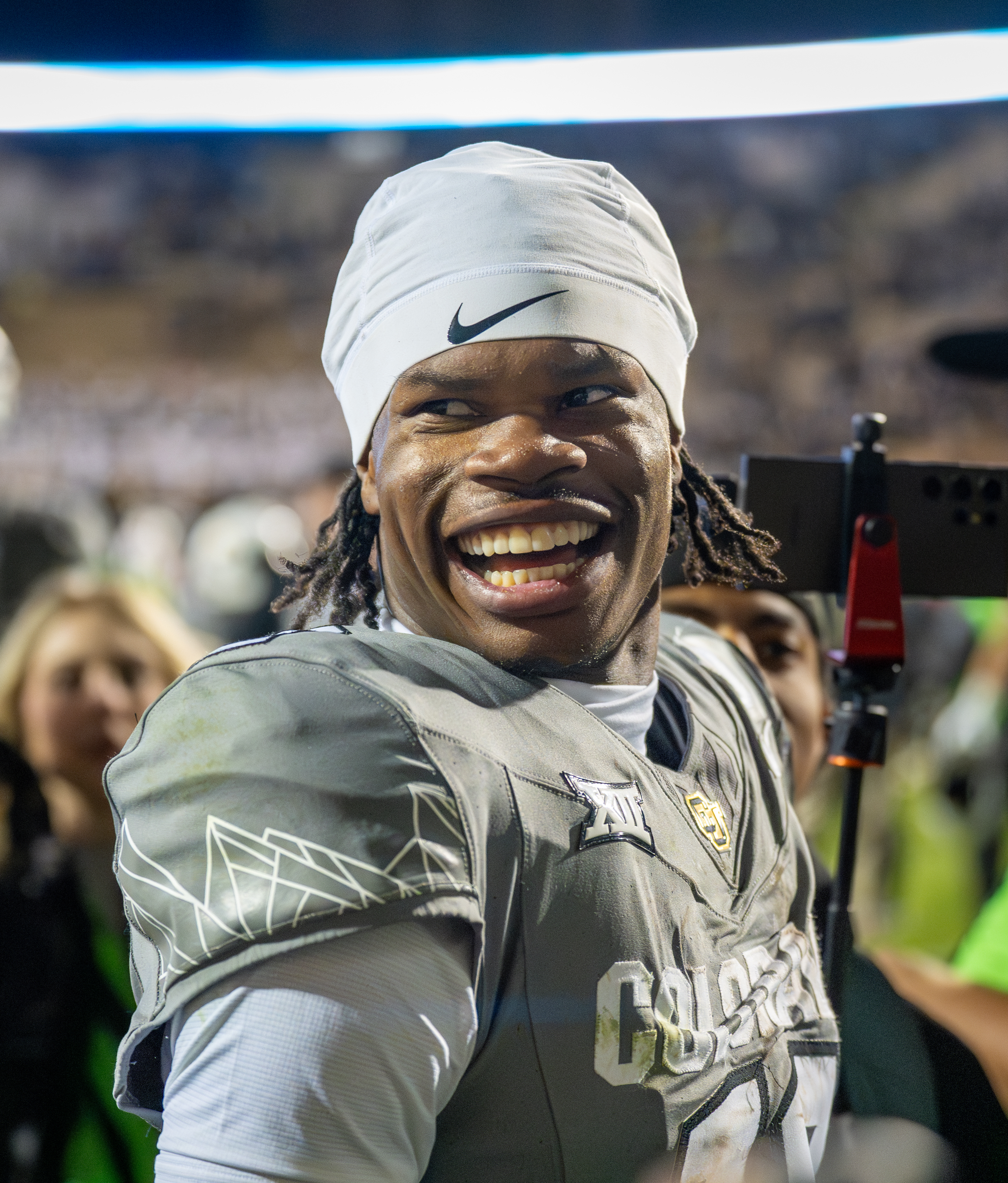
CB / WR Travis Hunter, 2024 Heisman Trophy winner

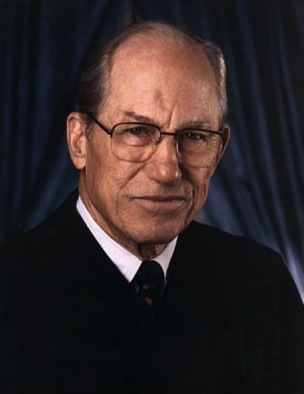
HB Byron White (future U.S. Supreme Court Justice) finished 2nd in Heisman voting in 1937

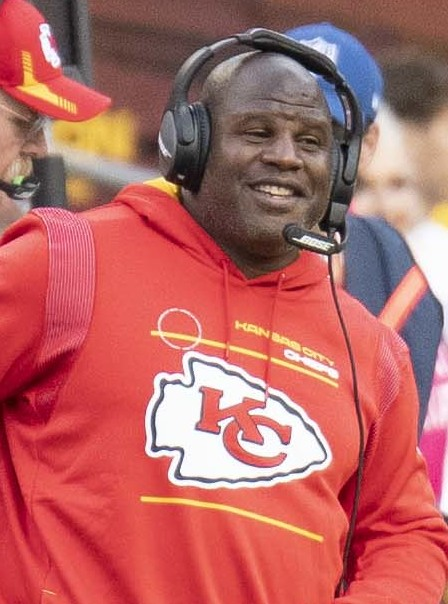
Eric Bieniemy (1987–1990), the school's all-time leader in rushing yards (3,940), touchdowns (42), and all-purpose yards (4,351)

=== Heisman Trophy ===
Year	Name	Position	Rank in Heisman voting	Points	Ref
1937	Byron White	HB	2nd	264	
1961	Joe Romig	OG/LB	6th	279	
1969	Bobby Anderson	TB	11th	100	
1971	Charlie Davis	TB	16th	28	
1989	Darian Hagan	QB	5th	292	
1990	Eric Bieniemy	TB	3rd	798	
1990	Darian Hagan	QB	17th	17	
1990	Mike Pritchard	WR	50th	2	
1991	Darian Hagan	QB	20th	12	
1992	Ronnie Blackmon	CB	30th	4	
1993	Charles Johnson	WR	15th	24	
1993	Michael Westbrook	WR	61st	1	
1994	Rashaan Salaam	TB	1st	743	
1994	Kordell Stewart	QB	13th	16	
2002	Chris Brown	TB	8th	48	
2024	Travis Hunter	CB/WR	1st	2,231	
2024	Shedeur Sanders	QB	8th	47	

=== Other award winners ===
==== Players ====
- Walter Camp Award

Rashaan Salaam – 1994

- Chuck Bednarik Award

Travis Hunter – 2024

- Dick Butkus Award

Alfred Williams – 1990
Matt Russell – 1996

- Doak Walker Award

Rashaan Salaam – 1994

- Fred Biletnikoff Award

Travis Hunter – 2024

- Jim Thorpe Award

Deon Figures – 1992
Chris Hudson – 1994

- John Mackey Award

Daniel Graham – 2001

- Johnny Unitas Golden Arm Award

Shedeur Sanders – 2024

- Lott IMPACT Trophy

Travis Hunter – 2024

- Ray Guy Award

Mark Mariscal – 2002

- Paul Hornung Award

Travis Hunter - 2023, 2024

- William V. Campbell Trophy

Jim Hansen – 1992 (Note: In 1992, this award was known as the Draddy Trophy.)

- Academic All-American of the Year (football)

Jim Hansen – 1992
Travis Hunter – 2024

==== Coach ====
- Paul "Bear" Bryant Award

1989 Bill McCartney

- Walter Camp Coach of the Year Award

2016 Mike MacIntyre

- Bobby Dodd Coach of the Year Award

2016 Mike MacIntyre

- Associated Press College Football Coach of the Year Award

2016 Mike MacIntyre

- Home Depot Coach of the Year Award

2016 Mike MacIntyre

- Eddie Robinson Coach of the Year Award

2016 Mike MacIntyre

- Pac-12 Conference Football Coach of the Year

2016 Mike MacIntyre

=== College Football Hall of Fame ===
Name	Induction	Ref
Byron White	1952	
Joe Romig	1984	
Dick Anderson	1993	
Bobby Anderson	2006	
Alfred Williams	2010	
John Wooten	2012	
Bill McCartney	2013	
Herb Orvis	2016	
Rashaan Salaam	2022	

=== Pro Football Hall of Fame ===
Colorado has one inductee into the Pro Football Hall of Fame.

- Cliff Branch – WR (1972–1988); HoF Class of 2022

=== All-Americans ===
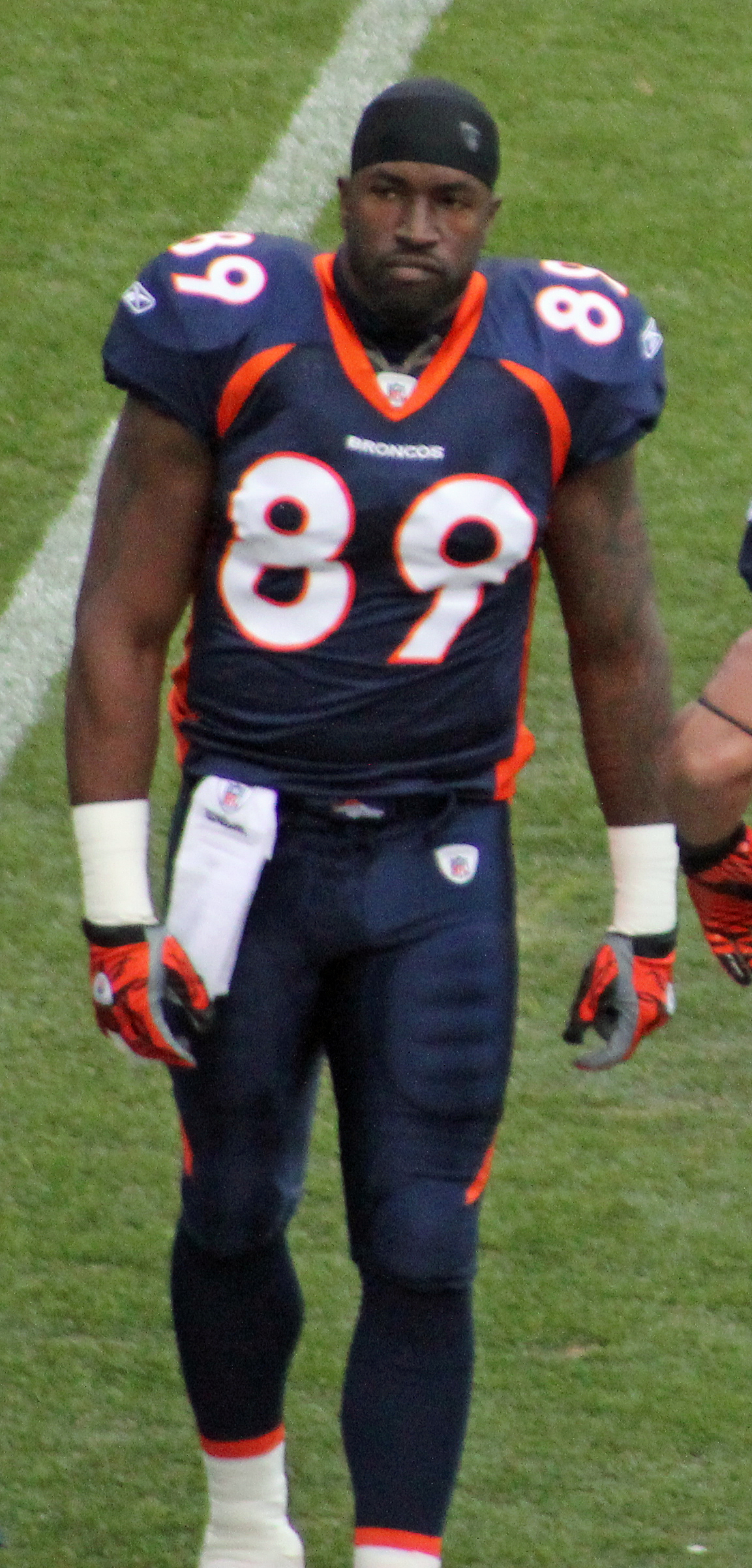
Daniel Graham

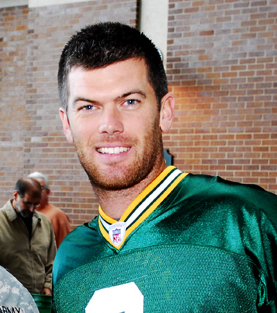
Mason Crosby

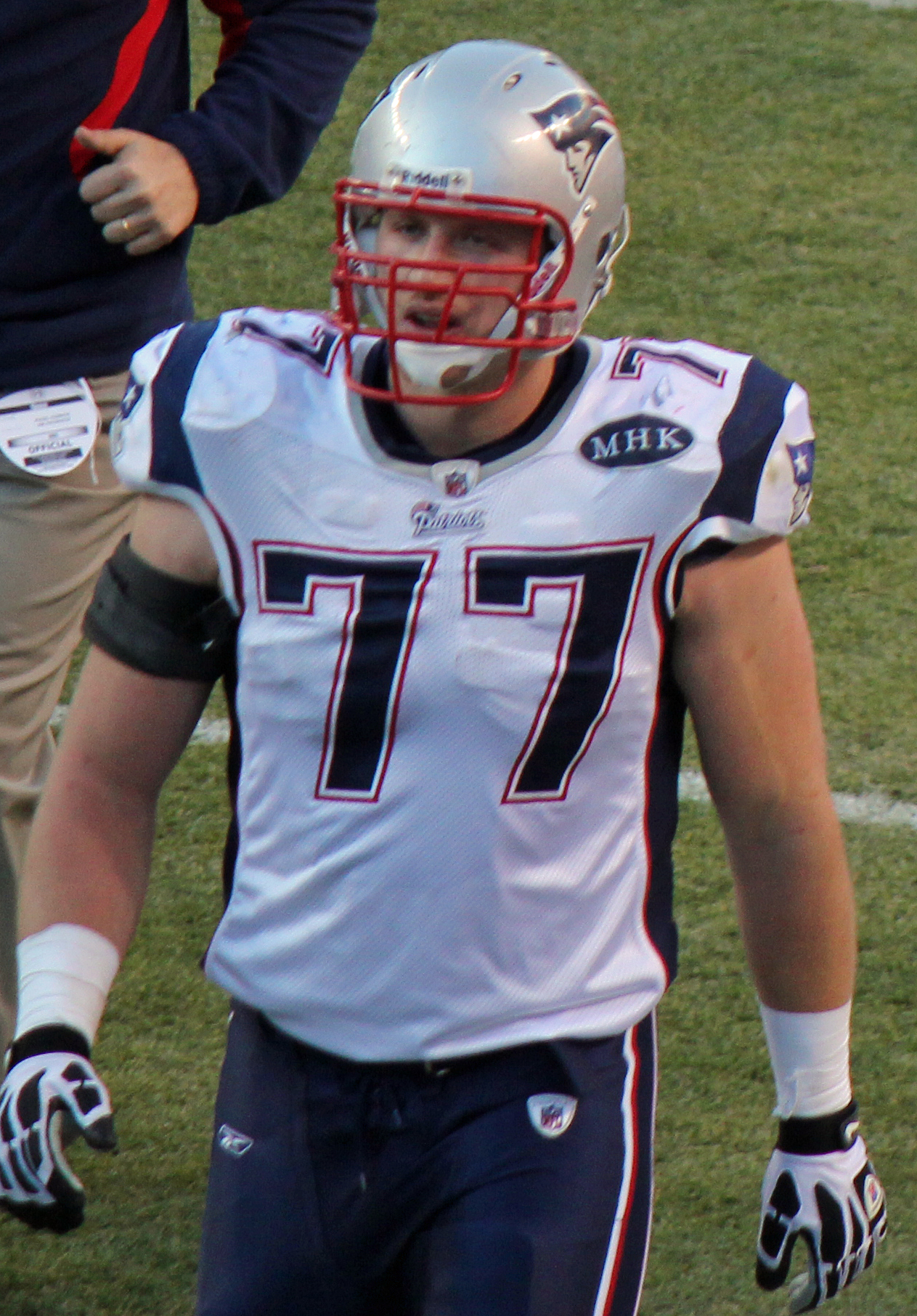
Nate Solder

The following is a list of Consensus All-Americans from CU as listed in NCAA record books.

- 1943 Robert Hall, Colorado (AP-2)
- 1953 Gary Knafelc, Colorado (AP-3)
- 1954 Frank Bernardi, Colorado (AP-2)
- 1956 John Bayuk, Colorado (INS-2; CP-3)
- 1960 Joe Romig, Colorado (WC)
- 1961 Joe Romig, Colorado (WC, TSN, FWAA)
- 1961 Jerry Hillebrand, Colorado (FWAA)
- 1967 Dick Anderson, Colorado (AP, NEA)
- 1968 Mike Montler, Colorado (AP, AFCA)
- 1969 Bobby Anderson, Colorado (AP, UPI, NEA, TSN)
- 1970 Pat Murphy, Colorado (WC)
- 1970 Don Popplewell, Colorado (AP, UPI, NEA, FWAA, WC, CP, FN)
- 1971 Herb Orvis, Colorado (WC, AFCA, TSN)
- 1971 Cliff Branch, Colorado (FN)
- 1972 Cullen Bryant, Colorado (UPI, NEA, AFCA, TSN, Time)
- 1972 Bud Magrum, Colorado (FWAA)
- 1973 Bo Matthews, Colorado (Time)
- 1973 J.V. Cain, Colorado (TSN, Time)
- 1975 Troy Archer, Colorado (Time)
- 1975 Pete Brock, Colorado (TSN, NEA, Time)
- 1975 Dave Logan, Colorado (TSN)
- 1975 Mark Koncar, Colorado (AP)
- 1976 Don Hasselbeck, Colorado (TSN)
- 1978 Matt Miller, Colorado (UPI)
- 1979 Mark Haynes, Colorado (AP)
- 1979 Stan Brock, Colorado (TSN)
- 1986 Barry Helton, Colorado (AP, UPI, TSN)
- 1988 Keith English, Colorado (AP)
- 1989 Tom Rouen, Colorado (AP, UPI, WC, FWAA)
- 1989 Kanavis McGhee, Colorado (WC)
- 1989 Alfred Williams, Colorado (UPI, AFCA, FWAA, FN)
- 1989 Darian Hagan, Colorado (TSN)
- 1989 Joe Garten, Colorado (AP, UPI, AFCA, FWAA, TSN)
- 1990 Alfred Williams, Colorado (AP, UPI, NEA, WC, AFCA, FWAA, SH, TSN, FN)
- 1990 Joe Garten, Colorado (AP, UPI, NEA, WC, AFCA, FWAA, SH, TSN, FN)
- 1990 Eric Bieniemy, Colorado (AP, UPI, NEA, WC, AFCA, FWAA, SH, TSN, FN)
- 1991 Joel Steed, Colorado (WC)
- 1991 Jay Leeuwenburg, Colorado (AP, UPI, NEA, WC, AFCA, FWAA, SH, TSN, FN)
- 1992 Mitch Berger, Colorado (UPI)
- 1992 Deon Figures, Colorado (AP, UPI, NEA, WC, FWAA, SH, TSN, FN)
- 1992 Michael Westbrook, Colorado (NEA)
- 1994 Chris Hudson, Colorado (Associated Press, Walter Camp, FWAA-Writers, Scripps-Howard)
- 1994 Michael Westbrook, Colorado (Walter Camp, AFCA-Coaches, Sporting News)
- 1994 Rashaan Salaam, Colorado (Associated Press, Walter Camp, FWAA-Writers, AFCA-Coaches, Scripps-Howard, Sporting News, Football News)
- 1995 Bryan Stoltenberg, Colorado (UPI, Walter Camp, FN)
- 1995 Heath Irwin, Colorado (AP)
- 1996 Matt Russell, Colorado (AP, FWAA-Writers, Walter Camp, TSN)
- 1996 Chris Naeole, Colorado (AP, AFCA-Coaches, Walter Camp, FN)
- 1996 Rae Carruth, Colorado (TSN)
- 1999 Ben Kelly, Colorado (FN, CNNSI-KR)
- 2001 Roman Hollowell, Colorado (TSN, CNNSI-PR)
- 2001 Andre Gurode, Colorado (AP, TSN, PFW, CNNSI)
- 2001 Daniel Graham, Colorado (Walter Camp, AFCA-Coaches, FWAA, AP, TSN, PFW, FN)
- 2002 Mark Mariscal, Colorado (AP, AFCA-Coaches, Walter Camp, TSN, CNNSI, ESPN)
- 2002 Wayne Lucier, Colorado (TSN)
- 2002 Chris Brown, Colorado (AFCA-Coaches)
- 2004 John Torp, Colorado (ESPN)
- 2005 Mason Crosby, Colorado (Associated Press, FWAA-Writers, Walter Camp, Sporting News, Sports Illustrated, Pro Football Weekly, ESPN, CBS Sports, College Football News, Rivals.com)
- 2006 Mason Crosby, Colorado (Walter Camp Foundation, Pro Football Weekly)
- 2007 Jordon Dizon, Colorado (Associated Press, Walter Camp, Sporting News, ESPN, College Football News, Rivals.com)
- 2010 Nate Solder, Colorado (AP, FWAA, TSN, WCFF, ESPN, PFW, SI)
- 2023 Travis Hunter, Colorado (AP, AFCA, FWAA, TSN, SI, Athlon Sports, Phil Steele)

=== Retired numbers ===
The following players have been honored by having their uniform numbers designated as retired numbers by the Buffaloes.

Colorado Buffaloes retired numbers
No.	Player	Pos.	Tenure	Year retired
2	Shedeur Sanders	QB	2023–2024	2025
11	Bobby Anderson	QB/RB	1967–1969	1969
12	Travis Hunter	CB/WR	2023–2024	2025
19^{†}	Rashaan Salaam	RB	1992–1994	2017
24	Byron White	HB	1935–1937	1937
67	Joe Romig	G	1959–1961	1961

† = Posthumously honored

In 2020, Colorado athletic director Rick George announced plans to re-issue uniform numbers 24, 67, and 11, with the support of the noted players (or their families). Contemporary uniforms issued with those numbers will include a commemorative patch. Nonetheless, no player has used any of those numbers since the announcement. Uniform number 19 will remain unused for 19 years, after which it may be re-issued. In 2025 Shedeur Sanders' and Travis Hunter's numbers had been retired. Despite the controversy, they were drafted in the 2025 NFL draft as the 144th and 2nd pick respectively.

== Future Big 12 opponents ==
On November 1, 2023, Colorado's Big 12 opponents from 2024 through 2027 were revealed.

Home Schedule

2027
Arizona State
Kansas
TCU
West Virginia
−

Away Schedule

2027
Arizona
BYU
Houston
Iowa State
UCF

== Future non-conference opponents ==
Announced schedules as of December 19, 2023.

2027	2028	2029	2030	2031	2032
Sept. 4 Colgate	Sept. 2 UMass	Sept. 1 TBA	Aug. 31; SMU	Aug. 30; Missouri	Sept. 4 North Texas
Sept. 11; Northwestern	Sept. 9 at Florida	Sept. 8 Florida	Sept. 7 at Missouri	Sept. 6 at SMU	Sept. 11; TBA
Sept. 18; Northern Illinois	Sept. 16; Northern Colorado	Sept. 15 at Colorado State	Sept. 14; Colorado State	Sept. 13; Northern Colorado	Sept. 18; TBA

Others beyond 2032: at North Texas, Sept. 3, 2033; vs. Colorado State, Sept. 17, 2033; at Colorado State, Sept. 16, 2034; vs. Colorado State, Sept. 19, 2037; at Colorado State, Sept. 11, 2038.
