= Harry Heller =

American college football player and coach (1874–1917)

Biographical details
- Born: October 14, 1874; Ottawa, Kansas, U.S.
- Died: April 2, 1917 (aged 42); Kansas City, Missouri, U.S.
- Education: Baker University; University of Colorado

Playing career
- 1893–1894: Baker
- 1894: Colorado
- 1895: Denver Athletic Club
- Position: Halfback

Coaching career (HC unless noted)
- 1894: Colorado

Head coaching record
- Overall: 8–1

Accomplishments and honors

Championships
- 1 Colorado Football Association (1894)

Harry Lionel Heller (October 14, 1874 – April 2, 1917) was an American football player and coach. He served as the first head football coach at the University of Colorado at Boulder, coaching one season in 1894 and compiling a record of 8–1.

== Biography ==
=== Early life and career ===
Heller was born in Ottawa, Kansas on October 14, 1874. He moved to Chanute sometime during his childhood. He attended Baker University and played as a halfback on the football team during the early 1890s. In 1894, Heller became the first head coach of the University of Colorado football team with the recommendation of team captain Harry P. Gamble. During the season, he led Colorado to its first conference championship. Heller stepped down as head coach following the season. The following year in 1895, Heller played on Denver Athletic Club's football team.

=== Later life ===
Heller later moved to Kansas City where he graduated from medical college and practiced medicine. On December 4, 1900, he married Margaret Berenice Macdonald (1880–1948). The two had a daughter, Margaret (1905–2005). Heller died in Kansas City from pneumonia on April 2, 1917.

== Head coaching record ==
Year	Team	Overall	Conference	Standing
Colorado Silver and Gold (Colorado Football Association) (1894)
1894	Colorado	8–1	5–0	1st
Colorado:		8–1	5–0	
Total:		8–1		
National championship Conference title Conference division title or championship game berth
