= Sonny Grandelius =

American football player and coach (1929–2008)

No. 24
- Position: Halfback

Personal information
- Born: April 16, 1929; Muskegon, Michigan, U.S.
- Died: April 25, 2008 (aged 79); Muskegon, Michigan, U.S.
- Listed height: 6 ft 0 in (1.83 m)
- Listed weight: 195 lb (88 kg)

Career information
- High school: Muskegon Heights (Muskegon Heights, Michigan)
- College: Michigan State
- NFL draft: 1951: 3rd round, 37th overall pick

Career history

Playing
- New York Giants (1953)

Coaching
- Michigan State (1954-1958) Assistant; Colorado (1959-1961) Head coach; Philadelphia Eagles (1962–1963) Assistant; Detroit Lions (1964) Assistant

Operations
- Detroit Wheels (1974) General manager

Awards and highlights
- Big Eight champion (1961); Big Eight Coach of the Year (1961); First-team All-American (1950); Duffy Daughtery Award (1991)

Career NFL statistics
- Rushing yards: 278
- Rushing average: 2.6
- Receptions: 15
- Receiving yards: 80
- Total touchdowns: 1
- Stats at Pro Football Reference

Head coaching record
- Regular season: 20–11–0 (.645)
- Postseason: Bowl: 0–1–0 (.000)

Everett John "Sonny" Grandelius (April 16, 1929 – April 25, 2008) was an American professional football player, coach, announcer, and executive. He served as the head football coach at the University of Colorado at Boulder from 1959 to 1961, compiling a record of 20–11 (.645). Grandelius played college football at Michigan State University from 1948 to 1950 and professionally in the National Football League (NFL) with the New York Giants in 1953.

== Playing career ==
Born in Muskegon Heights, Michigan, Grandelius attended Muskegon Heights High School, and is a 1987 inductee to the Muskegon Sports Hall of Fame. He led his team to back-to-back state championships in 1945 as a quarterback and in 1946 as a fullback when he was also selected as a first team All-State. As a senior at Michigan State in 1950, he gained 184 rushing yards in the season opener, establishing a then school record. During his senior season, he gained 1,023 yards and 11 touchdowns on 163 attempts, the 17th back in NCAA history to rush for 1,000 yards or more in a season and the first at Michigan State. He was the leading scorer for the team and selected as the team's MVP. Grandelius also was an All-American, selected by three publications including the AP. As of 2006, he was ranked fourth in career average yards per carry at Michigan State (6.09, minimum of 150 attempts) and tied for tenth in rushing touchdowns for a single season (11). He had seven 100-yard rushing games in his career. He was the MVP of the 1951 Hula Bowl and also lettered in boxing his sophomore year.

=== 100-yard rushing games ===
- 1949 season
  - October 1 • 11 carries for 104 yards vs. Marquette
  - November 19 • 12 carries for 116 vs. Arizona
- 1950 season
  - September 23 • 24 carries for 184 vs. Oregon State
  - October 7 • 14 carries for 110 vs. Maryland
  - October 21 • 16 carries for 122 vs. Marquette
  - October 28 • 21 carries for 114 vs. Notre Dame
  - November 4 • 25 carries for 177 vs. Indiana

Drafted as the 11th pick in the third round (37th overall) of the 1951 NFL draft, Grandelius played one season, in 1953, in the National Football League (NFL) for the New York Giants. He rushed 108 times for 278 yards with 1 touchdown and 3 fumbles and also had 15 receptions for 80 yards.

== Coaching career ==
Grandelius became an assistant coach at his alma mater in 1954 under newly promoted head coach Duffy Daugherty and stayed for five seasons, through 1958. He was hired as head coach at Colorado at age 29 in February 1959, succeeding recently fired Dallas Ward at a salary of $14,000. Grandelius led the Buffaloes to controversial greatness, including a Big Eight Conference championship in 1961 and an Orange Bowl berth on New Year's Day.

Shortly after their bowl loss to LSU, it became rumor that he had been using a slush fund to pay between 15 and 30 top recruits and their families. The NCAA investigated and released inconclusive findings on April 27, 1962, which led to more controversy; the university regents had fired Grandelius six weeks earlier on March 17. Only one regent of the six, Charles Bromley, voted not to fire Grandelius, saying the firing "violated every principle of fair play since the Magna Carta."

The football team was also punished for two seasons by not allowing television coverage of games or be involved in any post-season bowl games. At least 20 players lost scholarships or left Colorado. News accounts at the time claimed that Grandelius was the first coach in the country fired for recruiting improprieties. Under interim head coach Bud Davis in 1962, the Buffaloes had a dismal 2–8 record.

After leaving Colorado, Grandelius went on to assistant coaching positions in the NFL with the Detroit Lions and Philadelphia Eagles.

== Later life and death ==
Grandelius was a color commentator for Detroit Lions telecasts on CBS from 1965 to 1967. He was also the general manager for the Detroit Wheels of the World Football League (WFL) in 1974. Grandelius died on April 25, 2008, at age 79 in Beverly Hills, Michigan. He also had a wife, Martha Grandelius, and with her he had four children, Steven, Tammy, Kristin and Joel Grandelius. Along with being a loving father he also was a grandfather of five, Christopher Pendy, Andrew Pendy, Michael Pendy, Nick Grandelius and Grace Grandelius.

== Head coaching record ==
| Year | Team | Overall | Conference | Standing | Bowl/playoffs | Coaches^{#} | AP^{°} |
|---|---|---|---|---|---|---|---|
Colorado Buffaloes (Big Eight Conference) (1959–1961)
| 1959 | Colorado | 5–5 | 3–3 | T–3rd | | | |
| 1960 | Colorado | 6–4 (Note: Kansas later forfeited their 1960 Big Eight Conference win over Colorado because of the use of an ineligible player. Nonetheless, the NCAA and Colorado records credit Grandelius with the loss and a 6–4 record for the season.) | 5–2 | 2nd | | | |
| 1961 | Colorado | 9–2 | 7–0 | 1st | L Orange | 7 | 7 |
| Colorado: | | 20–11 | 15–5 | | | | |
| Total: | | 20–11 | | | | | |
National championship Conference title Conference division title or championship game berth
^{#}Rankings from final Coaches Poll.; ^{°}Rankings from final AP Poll.
