= Jon Embree =

American football player and coach (born 1965)

Personal information
- Born: October 15, 1965 (age 61); Los Angeles, California, U.S.
- Listed height: 6 ft 2 in (1.88 m)
- Listed weight: 234 lb (106 kg)

Career information
- Position: Tight end (No. 87)
- High school: Cherry Creek (Greenwood Village, Colorado)
- College: Colorado
- NFL draft: 1987: 6th round, 166th overall pick

Career history

Playing
- Los Angeles Rams (1987–1988); Seattle Seahawks (1989)*; Denver Broncos (1990)*
- * Offseason or practice squad member only

Coaching
- Colorado (1991) Volunteer assistant coach; Douglas County HS (1992) Wide receivers coach & tight ends coach; Colorado (1993–1994) Tight ends coach; Colorado (1995–1998) Defensive ends coach; Colorado (1999–2000) Tight ends coach; Colorado (2001–2002) Wide receivers coach & kickers coach; UCLA (2003) Assistant head coach & wide receivers coach; UCLA (2004–2005) Assistant head coach & tight ends coach; Kansas City Chiefs (2006–2008) Tight ends coach; Washington Redskins (2010) Tight ends coach; Colorado (2011–2012) Head coach; Cleveland Browns (2013) Tight ends coach; Tampa Bay Buccaneers (2014–2016) Tight ends coach; San Francisco 49ers (2017–2021) Assistant head coach & tight ends coach; Miami Dolphins (2022–2025) Assistant head coach & tight ends coach

Awards and highlights
- First-team All-Big Eight (1984); Second-team All-Big Eight (1986)

Head coaching record
- Regular season: NCAA: 4–21 (.160)
- Stats at Pro Football Reference

Jon William Embree (born October 15, 1965) is an American football coach and former player who most recently served as the assistant head coach and tight ends coach for the Miami Dolphins of the National Football League (NFL). He is a former head coach at Colorado. Prior to that, he was the tight ends coach for the Washington Redskins of the NFL. As a player, he spent two seasons in the NFL with the Los Angeles Rams as a tight end until an injury ended his career. He was selected in the sixth round of the 1987 NFL draft by the Rams, after playing college football at Colorado.

Embree previously coached for three seasons with the Kansas City Chiefs, three with UCLA, one with the Cleveland Browns and ten at Colorado. After his playing career ended, Embree entered television broadcasting, then was asked to volunteer coach in 1991 for the Buffaloes by head coach Bill McCartney. Embree was a member of McCartney's first recruiting class as head coach in 1983. Embree was Colorado's head football coach in 2011 and 2012. He was terminated after compiling a 4–21 record including 1–11 in his final year, the worst year in school history.

== Playing career ==
Embree attended El Camino College Compton Center in Los Angeles. He was a sixth round draft selection of the Los Angeles Rams in the 1987 NFL draft.

== Coaching career ==
Embree began serving on Mike McDaniel's Miami Dolphins coaching staff during the 2022 campaign, serving as the team's assistant head coach and tight ends coach. On February 2, 2026, it was announced that the Dolphins would not retain Embree for the 2026 season.

== Personal life ==
Embree is the son of former NFL player John Embree, who was a wide receiver for the Denver Broncos in 1969 and 1970. Born in Los Angeles, Embree grew up in Colorado and graduated from Cherry Creek High School in suburban Denver in 1983. Jon and his wife Natalyn have three children, Hannah, Taylor, a former wide receiver at UCLA and former running backs coach for the New England Patriots, and Connor, a former wide receiver at UNLV and former wide receivers coach for the Kansas City Chiefs.

== Head coaching record ==
Year	Team	Overall	Conference	Standing
Colorado Buffaloes (Pac-12 Conference) (2011–2012)
2011	Colorado	3–10	2–7	T–5th (South)
2012	Colorado	1–11	1–8	6th (South)
Colorado:		4–21	3–15	
Total:		4–21		
