= Colorado Sports Hall of Fame =

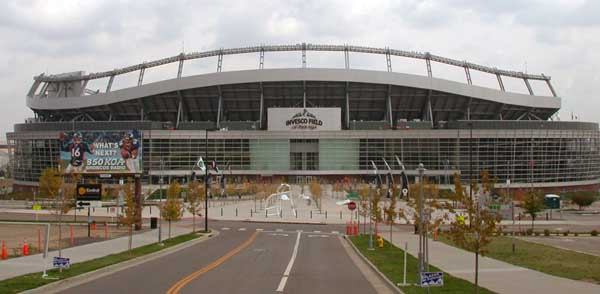
- West entrance of Empower Field at Mile High
- Established: 1965
- Location: Empower Field at Mile High; 1701 Mile High Stadium Circle; Denver, Colorado
- Coordinates: 39.7441°N 105.021°W
- Type: Hall of fame, sports museum
- Website: www.coloradosports.orgg

The Colorado Sports Hall of Fame (CSHoF) is a hall of fame and museum that honors—by public acknowledgment or commemoration—individuals who merit recognition and distinction for their exploits, accomplishments, and leadership in sports and athletic endeavors in the state of Colorado. The museum is located at Gate #1 on the west side of Empower Field at Mile High, in Denver, Colorado, and each year's inductees are honored on the Sports Legend Mall and Legacy Pillars that adjoin the Museum.

The Hall of Fame was incorporated on November 4, 1964, initially as a board of directors operating out of the Denver Chamber of Commerce. It opened as a physical entity in August 2001, coincident with the opening of the sports stadium that hosts it.

== Selection process ==
Inductees to the Colorado Sports Hall of Fame are chosen by an independent Selection Committee composed of (approximately 29) media representatives from throughout the State of Colorado. Nominations are submitted by the public. From these, the committee selects four to six inductees each year, considering each nominee's recognition and distinction in sports, and his or her achievements in bringing "fame and glory to the State of Colorado through outstanding accomplishments in athletic participation, teaching, coaching, administration, promotion, refereeing, ownership, reporting, or training".

== Inductees ==
The members of the Colorado Sports Hall of Fame are:

Year	Inductees
1965	Dutch Clark
1965	Jack Dempsey
1965	Byron White
1966	Eddie Eagan
1966	Willard N. Greim
1967	Jack Christiansen
1967	Everett Marshall
1967	Buddy Werner
1968	Jerome Biffle
1968	Ace Gruenig
1968	Edwin C. Johnson
1968	Jack McCracken
1969	John W. Hancock
1969	Glenn Morris
1969	Hayes Alan Jenkins
1969	David Jenkins

Year	Inductees
1970	Peggy Fleming
1970	Lionel Taylor
1970	Frank Potts
1971	Bill Toomey
1971	N.C. "Tub" Morris
1971	Thurman "Fum" McGraw
1971	Bob Howsam
1972	Gordon Wren
1972	William Thayer Tutt
1972	Boyd Dowler
1972	Harry Walker Hughes
1973	Willy Schaeffler
1973	Joe Romig
1973	Coburn Jones
1973	Vince Boryla
1974	Babe Didrikson Zaharias
1974	Mark Duncan
1974	L.C. "Pete" Butler
1974	Murray Armstrong
1975	Dallas Ward
1975	George W. Scott
1975	Robert "Barney" McLean
1975	Rich Jackson
1976	Adolph "Pat" Panek
1976	Ervin Hinds
1976	Joe "Awful" Coffee
1976	Harry "Dean" Carlson
1977	Floyd Little
1977	Russell Volk
1977	Edward "Big Ed" McGlone
1977	Phyllis Lockwood
1977	Burdette Haldorson
1978	Lawrence "Spud" Orr
1978	Ben Martin
1978	Kayo Lam
1978	Young Corbett II
1979	Juan Reid
1979	C.H. "Lou" Kellogg
1979	Carroll Hardy
1979	Marvin Crawford

Year	Inductees
1980	Louis Unser
1980	Fritz Brennecke
1980	Jim Baggot
1980	Richard Anderson
1981	Lloyd Gaskill
1981	Walter Franklin
1981	Joan Birkland
1981	Byron Beck
1982	Harry Simmons
1982	Gerald Phipps
1982	Charles "Poss" Parsons
1982	Bobby Anderson
1983	Frank Tripucka
1983	Ivan Thomas
1983	Chester Nelson
1983	Bauldie Moschetti
1984	Freddie Joe Steinmark
1984	Richard Hotton
1984	Goose Gonsoulin
1984	Larry Bollig
1985	Billy Thompson
1985	Bill Masterton
1985	Hatfield Chilson
1985	Leonard Cahn
1986	Lew Mahony
1986	Haven Moses
1986	Craig Morton
1986	Hale Irwin
1986	William Hinkley
1987	Dan Issel
1987	Randy Gradishar
1987	Robert "Bus" Campbell
1987	Roy Byers
1988	Richard Yates
1988	Dan Stavely
1988	Red Miller
1988	Rodolfo "Corky" Gonzales
1989	Tom Jackson
1989	Dale Douglass
1989	Jim Darden
1989	Cliff Buck

Year	Inductees
1990	Jim Williams
1990	Greeley Timothy
1990	Eddie Crowder
1990	Jim Burris
1991	James Lee Willard
1991	Joe Vigil
1991	Sam Suplizio
1991	Bob Martin
1991	Keith Magnuson
1992	Chuck Bresnahan
1992	Carl Scheer
1992	Louis Wright
1992	G.K. "Joe" Guennel
1992	Gary Glick
1993	Goose Gossage
1993	Dave Garland
1993	Dale Dodrill
1993	Dick Connor
1993	Bob Beattie
1994	Frank Haraway
1994	Alex English
1994	Donald Ray DesCombes
1994	Chuck Darling
1994	Walt Clay
1995	"Smoky Joe" Wood
1995	William W. "Billy" Kidd
1995	John Clune
1995	Connie Carpenter-Phinney
1995	Bus Bergman
1996	Art Unger
1996	David Thompson
1996	Scott Hamilton
1996	Bruce Ford
1996	Judy Bell
1997	Larry Varnell
1997	John Stearns
1997	Doug Moe
1997	Gil Cruter
1997	Irv Brown
1997	Adam Berry
1998	Russell "Sox" Walseth
1998	Barbara McIntire
1998	Lloyd Madden
1998	Bill Daniels
1998	Leroy Tracy Borah
1999	Jack Vickers
1999	Bill McCartney
1999	Jack Harvey
1999	John Elway
1999	Jim Conboy

Year	Inductees
2000	Robert Travaglini
2000	Greg Riddoch
2000	Dan Reeves
2000	Dave Logan
2000	John Adams
2001	Amy Van Dyken
2001	Lonnie Porter
2001	Karl Mecklenburg
2001	Pat Day
2001	Bob Davis
2001	Don Carlsen
2002	Tom Petroff
2002	Bill Marolt
2002	Bill Fanning
2002	Joe Collier
2002	Fred Casotti
2003	Rick Upchurch
2003	Ron Shavlik
2003	Tippy Martinez
2003	Guy Gibbs
2003	Gilbert "Gib" Funk
2004	Fred Tesone
2004	Patrick Roy
2004	Charles "Babe" Lind
2004	Bill Hanzlik
2004	Tanya Haave
2004	Terrell Davis
2005	Shannon Sharpe
2005	Dick Katte
2005	Chad Hennings
2005	April Heinrichs
2005	Pat Haggerty
2005	Joe Belmont
2006	Dennis Smith
2006	Davis Phinney
2006	J. Allen "Pat" Patten
2006	William Hybl
2006	Tom Hancock
2006	Ceal Barry
2007	Scott Wedman
2007	Hank Kashiwa
2007	Andres Galarraga
2007	Ben Dreith
2007	Pat Bowlen
2007	Carol Baily
2008	Starr Yelland
2008	Frank Shorter
2008	Bill Noxon
2008	Pierre Lacroix
2008	Dow Finsterwald
2008	Fisher DeBerry
2009	Rod Smith
2009	John Mosley
2009	Jerry McMorris
2009	Sonny Lubick
2009	Laurice Hunter
2009	Ralph Backstrom

Year	Inductees
2010	Larry Zimmer
2010	Mike Shanahan
2010	Joe Sakic
2010	Dean Lahr
2010	Marc Johnson
2010	Bob Blasi
2011	Alfred Williams
2011	Larry Walker
2011	Bobby Unser
2011	Keli McGregor
2011	Jason Elam
2011	Art Berglund
2012	Will Nicholson, Jr.
2012	Greg Myers
2012	Glen Gondrezick
2012	Peter Forsberg
2012	Frank Carbajal
2012	Marcelo Balboa
2013	Stan Williams
2013	Steve Jones
2013	Adam Foote
2013	Don Cockroft
2013	Don Baylor
2013	Steve Atwater
2014	Dorothy Mauk
2014	Todd Helton
2014	Darian Hagan
2014	Andre Gambucci
2014	Frosty Cox
2014	Otis Armstrong
2015	John Dikeou
2015	Roy Halladay
2015	Chauncey Billups
2015	John Gagliardi
2015	Warren Mitchell
2015	Becky Hammon
2016	Vinny Castilla
2016	Rhonda Blanford-Green
2016	Ralph Simpson
2016	Milan Hejduk
2016	Jim Toupal
2016	Jim Danley
2017	Champ Bailey
2017	Dante Bichette
2017	Jeremy Bloom
2017	Maurice "Stringy" Ervin
2017	Hashim Kahn
2017	John Wooten
2018	Peyton Manning
2018	Joe Glenn
2018	Rashaan Salaam
2018	Sam Pagano
2018	Tracy Hill
2018	Alex Burl
2019	Missy Franklin
2019	Daniel Graham
2019	Marv Kay
2019	Todd Lodwick
2019	Bob Smith
2019	Tom Southhall

Year	Inductees
2020–2021	Alonzo Babers
2020–2021	Bob Gebhard
2020–2021	George Gwozdecky
2020–2021	Terry Miller
2020–2021	Erin Popovich
2020–2021	Lindsey Vonn
2022	Carol Callan
2022	Roger Kinney
2022	Ed McCaffrey
2022	Darnell McDonald
2022	Chuck Williams
2022	DaVarryl Williamson
2023	Evie Dennis
2023	Jimmie Heuga
2023	Demaryius Thomas
2023	Vincent Jackson
2023	George Karl
2024	Rudy Carey
2024	Scott Stocker
2024	Barney Chavous
2024	Tony Boselli
2024	Woody Paige
2025	Mikaela Shiffrin
2025	Simon Fletcher
2025	Lisa van Goor
2025	Bubbles Anderson
2025	Larry Brown
2025	Troy Tulowitzki
2026	Fat Lever
2026	Gigi Fernández
2026	Wendy Koenig
2026	Kordell Stewart
2026	Harry Holliness
2026	Steve Foley

== See also ==
- Sports in Colorado
