= Charlie Parsons (disambiguation) =

Charlie Parsons is a TV producer.

Charlie Parsons may also refer to:

- Charlie Parsons (baseball)
- Charlie Parsons (footballer)

== See also ==
- Charles Parsons (disambiguation)
