= 1919 Colorado College Tigers football team =

American college football season

1919 Colorado College Tigers football

RMC co-champion
- Conference: Rocky Mountain Conference
- Record: 4–2–1 (3–1–1 RMC)
- Head coach: Charles "Poss" Parsons (1st season)
- Home stadium: Washburn Field

1919 Rocky Mountain Conference football standings
	Conf.					Overall
Team	W		L		T	W		L		T
Colorado Agricultural $	7	–	1	–	0	7	–	1	–	0
Utah	4	–	1	–	0	5	–	2	–	0
Colorado College	3	–	1	–	1	4	–	2	–	1
Utah Agricultural	3	–	2	–	0	5	–	2	–	0
Wyoming †	3	–	3	–	0	3	–	5	–	0
Colorado	2	–	3	–	1	2	–	3	–	1
Denver	0	–	4	–	1	1	–	5	–	1
Colorado Mines	0	–	4	–	1	0	–	4	–	3
Montana State †	0	–	3	–	0	1	–	3	–	1
$ – Conference champion; † Ineligible for conference title

The 1919 Colorado College Tigers football team represented Colorado College during the 1919 college football season. The team was led by head coach Poss Parsons.

== Schedule ==
Date	Opponent	Site	Result
October 7	Camp Logan	Colorado Springs, CO	W 80–3
October 11	at Utah	Cummings Field; Salt Lake City, UT	L 20–0
October 25	at Colorado	Gamble Field; Boulder, CO	T 14–14
November 1	Colorado Mines	Colorado Springs, CO	W 7–3
November 8	at Creighton		L 47–0
November 15	Denver	Colorado Springs, CO	W 38–0
November 27	Colorado Agricultural	Colorado Springs, CO	W 13–0
