= Dale Hardy =

American football and track coach (1924–2013)

Biographical details
- Born: December 6, 1924; South Dakota, U.S.
- Died: January 13, 2013 (aged 88); Hot Springs, South Dakota, U.S.

Playing career

Football
- 1946–1947: Black Hills

Track and field
- c. 1947: Black Hills

Coaching career (HC unless noted)

Football
- 1952: Colorado (freshmen)
- 1953–1954: Trinidad
- 1955–1957: Denver (assistant)
- 1959–1966: Black Hills / Black Hills State

Track and field
- 1953–1955: Trinidad
- 1955–1958: Denver

Head coaching record
- Overall: 27–32–4 (college football)

Accomplishments and honors

Championships
- Football; 2 EJCC (1953–1954)

Dale Walter Hardy (December 6, 1924 – January 13, 2013) was an American college football and track and field coach. He served as the head football coach at the Trinidad State Junior College (now known as Trinidad State College) in Trinidad, Colorado from 1953 to 1954 and Black Hills Teachers College (which became Black Hills State College in 1963 and is now known as Black Hills State University) in Spearfish, South Dakota from 1959 to 1966.

Hardy was born on December 6, 1924, to Walter and Hazel Hardy. He graduated in 1943 from Sturgis Brown High School in Sturgis, South Dakota. He then attended the University of Colorado—now known as the University of Colorado Boulder via the V-12 Navy College Training Program. After serving in the United States Navy during World War II, Hardy earned a bachelor of science degree from Black Hills Teachers College, in 1948. He received a Master of Science degree from the University of Colorado in 1954.

Hardy coached the freshman football team at the University of Colorado in 1952. The following spring, he was hired as head football coach, track coach, and mathematics instructor at Trinidad. Sturgis led his 1953 Trinidad football team to an undefeated season and an Empire Junior College Conference (EJCC) title. The next year, his 1954 Trinidad Trojans were again undefeated, with a perfect 10–0 record, and repeated as EJCC champions.

In 1955, Hardy left Trinidad for Denver University, where he was appointed head track coach and assistant football coach under John Roning. He served as head freshmen football coach at Denver from 1955 to 1957. Hardy returned to Black Hills in 1959 as head football coach. He left Black Hill State in 1967 on a sabbatical to pursue of doctorate degree at Indiana University.

Hardy died on January 13, 2013, at the South Dakota Veteran's Home in Hot Springs, South Dakota. Hard was the older brother of Carroll Hardy who played in Major League Baseball and in the National Football League.

== Head coaching record ==
=== College football ===
Year	Team	Overall	Conference	Standing	Bowl/playoffs
Black Hills / Black Hills State Yellow Jackets (South Dakota Intercollegiate Conference) (1959–1966)
1959	Black Hills	1–6	1–6	8th	
1960	Black Hills	1–6–1	0–5–1	T–6th	
1961	Black Hills	3–5	2–4	T–4th	
1962	Black Hills	3–5	2–4	T–5th	
1963	Black Hills	4–3–1	2–3–1	4th	
1964	Black Hills State	5–2–1	3–2–1	3rd	
1965	Black Hills State	5–3	3–3	T–4th	
1966	Black Hills State	5–2–1	3–2–1	3rd	
Black Hills / Black Hills State:		27–32–4	16–29–4		
Total:		27–32–4			

=== Junior college football ===
Year	Team	Overall	Conference	Standing	Bowl/playoffs
Trinidad Trojans (Empire Junior College Conference) (1953–1954)
1953	Trinidad		6–0–1	1st	
1954	Trinidad	10–0	7–0	1st	
Trinidad:			13–0–1		
Total:					
National championship Conference title Conference division title or championship game berth
