= Charles Parsons =

Charles Parsons may refer to:

- Charles Algernon Parsons (1854–1931), English engineer known for his invention of the steam turbine
- Charles Parsons (philosopher) (1933–2024), professor in the philosophy of mathematics at Harvard University
- Chick Parsons (Charles Thomas Parsons, Jr., 1900–1988), American businessman, diplomat, and decorated World War II veteran
- Chuck Parsons (Charles W. Parsons, 1924–1999), American sports car racing driver
- Charlie Parsons (born 1958), television producer
- Charlie Parsons (baseball) (1863–1936), Major League Baseball pitcher
- Charlie Parsons (footballer) (Charles Berry Parsons, 1903–1965), Australian rules footballer
- Charles Parsons (British Army officer) (1855–1923)
- Charles Wynford Parsons (1901–1950), British zoologist
- Charles Lathrop Parsons (1867–1954), American chemist
- Charles "Poss" Parsons (1892–1942), American college football player and coach
- Charles Parsons (sprinter) (born 1911), American sprinter, 3rd in the 200 m at the 1934 USA Outdoor Track and Field Championships
