= Bus Bergman =

American college athlete and coach (1920–2010)

Biographical details
- Born: June 11, 1920; Denver, Colorado, U.S.
- Died: March 28, 2010 (aged 89); Grand Junction, Colorado, U.S.

Playing career

Football
- 1939–1941: Colorado Agricultural

Basketball
- 1940–1942: Colorado Agricultural

Baseball
- 1939–1942: Colorado Agricultural
- Position: Halfback

Coaching career (HC unless noted)

Football
- 1942: Colorado Agricultural (assistant)
- 1947: Fort Lewis (assistant)
- 1948–1949: Fort Lewis
- 1950–1965: Mesa (CO)

Baseball
- 1951–1975: Mesa (CO)
- 1953–1961: Grand Junction Eagles

Administrative career (AD unless noted)
- ?–1950: Fort Lewis

Head coaching record
- Overall: 93–60–9 (junior college football); 378–201 (junior college baseball); 260–93 (college summer baseball)
- Bowls: 0–1

Accomplishments and honors

Championships
- Football; 3 CJCC/EJCC (1949, 1951, 1956)

Awards
- Colorado Sports Hall of Fame (1995)

Walter Fred "Bus" Bergman (June 11, 1920 – March 28, 2010) was an American college football, college basketball, and college baseball player and coach. He served as the head football coach at Fort Lewis A&M College—now known as Fort Lewis College—in Durango, Colorado from 1948 to 1949 and Mesa College—now known as Colorado Mesa University—in Grand Junction, Colorado from 1950 to 1965.

A native of Denver, Bergman graduated from North High School in 1938. He then attended Colorado State College of Agriculture and Mechanic Arts—now known as Colorado State University, where he lettered in football, basketball, and baseball. In football he played halfback and captained the 1941 Colorado A&M Aggies football team. Bergman graduated from Colorado A&M in 1942 with a Bachelor of Science degree. During World War II, he served as officer in the United States Marine Corps in the Pacific. He was awarded the Bronze Star Medal for heroism at the Battle of Okinawa.

In May 1947, Bergman was hired by Fort Lewis as head basketball coach and assistant football coach under Maurice Elder. In 1950, He left Fort Lewis to accept a job as head football coach and physical education instructor at Mesa College. He coached football at Mesa through 1965 season. Bergman was also the baseball coach at Mesa from 1951 to 1975. He led the Mesa baseball team to 20 conference titles and an overall record of 378–201. In addition, Bergman scouted for the Philadelphia Phillies of Major League Baseball (MLB) and coached the Grand Junction Eagles, a Collegiate summer baseball team, amassing a record of 260–83. He was inducted into the Colorado Sports Hall of Fame in 1995.

Bergman died on March 28, 2010, in Grand Junction. He was the father of Jane Norton, who served as lieutenant governor of Colorado.

== Head coaching record ==
=== Junior college football ===
Year	Team	Overall	Conference	Standing	Bowl/playoffs
Fort Lewis Aggies (Colorado Junior College Conference) (1948–1949)
1948	Fort Lewis	5–3	4–2	3rd	
1949	Fort Lewis	7–3	4–0	1st	L Texas Rose Bowl
Fort Lewis:		12–6	8–2		
Mesa Mavericks (Colorado Junior College Conference / Empire Junior College Conference) (1950–1962)
1950	Mesa	5–2–1	3–1–1	2nd	
1951	Mesa	8–0	5–0	1st	
1952	Mesa	5–1–1	4–0–1	2nd	
1953	Mesa	5–1–2	4–0–2	2nd	
1954	Mesa	6–3–1	4–1–1	3rd	
1955	Mesa	6–3	2–3	6th	
1956	Mesa	7–2	6–0	1st	
1957	Mesa	7–2–1	4–1–1	3rd	
1958	Mesa	8–3	4–1	2nd	
1959	Mesa	8–2	4–2	3rd	
1960	Mesa	2–6	2–4	T–6th	
1961	Mesa	2–6–1	2–4	6th	
1962	Mesa	6–3	3–2	3rd	
Mesa Mavericks (Intermountain Collegiate Athletic Conference) (1963–1965)
1963	Mesa	3–6–1	2–2–1	3rd	
1964	Mesa	1–8	0–4	5th	
1965	Mesa	2–6–1	1–3	4th	
Mesa:		81–54–9	50–28–7		
Total:		93–60–9			
National championship Conference title Conference division title or championship game berth
