= Kay Dalton =

American gridiron football player and coach (1932–2022)

Biographical details
- Born: May 4, 1932; Moab, Utah, U.S.
- Died: August 22, 2022 (aged 90)

Playing career
- 1950–1953: Colorado State
- Position: End

Coaching career (HC unless noted)
- 1958–1960: Trinidad
- 1961–1965: Western State (CO)
- 1966: Montreal Alouettes (DC)
- 1967–1969: Montreal Alouettes
- 1970: BC Lions (WR/OL)
- 1971–1972: Colorado (QB)
- 1973: Colorado (recruiting)
- 1974–1976: Denver Broncos (WR)
- 1977: Buffalo Bills (WR)
- 1978–1979: Kansas City Chiefs (WR)
- 1980–1982: Kansas City Chiefs (QB/WR)
- 1983–1984: Houston Oilers (OC)
- 1985: Buffalo Bills (QB)
- 1986: Denver Broncos (SA)
- 1987–1988: Colorado State (OC)
- 1989–1999: Northern Colorado (OC)
- 2000–2005: Northern Colorado

Head coaching record
- Overall: 71–43 (college); 7–31–4 (CFL)
- Bowls: 0–1
- Tournaments: 2–1 (NCAA D-II playoffs)

Accomplishments and honors

Championships
- 2 Empire Junior College Conference (1959–1960); 3 RMC (1963–1965); 1 NCC (2002)

Orris Kay Dalton (May 4, 1932 – August 22, 2022) was an American football coach. He served as the head football coach at Western State College of Colorado—now known as Western Colorado University—from 1961 to 1965 and Northern Colorado University from 2000 to 2005, compiling a career college football coaching record of 71–43. Dalton was also the head coach for the Montreal Alouettes of the Canadian Football League (CFL) from 1967 to 1969, tallying a mark of 7–31–4.

== Biography ==
Dalton began coaching in 1958 as Trinidad State Junior College's head coach. In 1961, he became head coach of Western State College. He had a 33–12 record at WSC, and in 1964 led the Mountaineers to the Mineral Water Bowl. In his five seasons as coach, he led WSC to four Rocky Mountain Conference championships.

Dalton moved to the professional ranks in 1966 as the defensive coordinator of the Montreal Alouettes. In 1967, he was promoted to head coach after Darrell Mudra resigned to coach at the University of Arizona. Dalton was fired after the 1969 season and was replaced by the team's former quarterback, Sam Etcheverry. He had a 7–31–4 record over three seasons. In 1970, he stayed in the CFL, becoming the offensive line and wide receiver coach of the BC Lions.

In 1971, Dalton returned to college football as quarterbacks coach of the Colorado Buffaloes. He coached the Buffaloes' quarterbacks for two seasons before being reassigned as a recruiting officer at Colorado.

He returned to the pros in 1974 as the wide receivers coach for the Denver Broncos. In 1977, he joined Lou Saban's coaching staff, serving as the receivers coach of the Buffalo Bills. After not being retained by Chuck Knox, Dalton held the same position with the Kansas City Chiefs under Marv Levy, another former Alouettes coach. After Levy was fired, he moved to the Houston Oilers coaching staff as offensive coordinator under Ed Biles, Chuck Studley, and Hugh Campbell. In 1985, he rejoined Buffalo Bills as quarterbacks coach before returning to the Broncos the following season as special offensive assistant coach.

In 1987, he returned to his alma mater Colorado State University as the team's offensive coordinator. In 1989, he became the offensive coordinator at the University of Northern Colorado, a position he would hold for 11 years before his promotion to head coach. The Bears won Division II national championships in 1996 and 1997. Quarterback Corte McGuffey won the Harlon Hill Trophy as the NCAA Division II college football player of the year in 1999.

In 2000, Dalton was promoted to head coach when Joe Glenn accepted the same position at the University of Montana. He would guide the team through the early portion of the school's transition from Division II to Division I (I-AA in football). He was relieved of his duties December 2, 2005, by athletic director Jay Hinrichs. Dalton had a 38–31 record in six seasons as the Bears' head coach.

Dalton died on August 22, 2022.

== Head coaching record ==
=== College ===
Year	Team	Overall	Conference	Standing	Bowl/playoffs	UPI^{#}	AFCA^{°}
Western State Mountaineers (Rocky Mountain Conference) (1961–1965)
1961	Western State	4–5	2–2	T–2nd			
1962	Western State	5–4	2–2	T–2nd			
1963	Western State	8–1	4–0	1st			
1964	Western State	9–1	3–0	1st	L Mineral Water	11	
1965	Western State	7–1	3–0	1st		19	
Western State:		33–12	14–4				
Northern Colorado Bears (North Central Conference) (2000–2002)
2000	Northern Colorado	4–7	3–6	T–7th			
2001	Northern Colorado	7–4	4–4	T–4th			
2002	Northern Colorado	12–2	8–0	1st	L NCAA Division II Semifinal		7
Northern Colorado Bears (NCAA Division II independent) (2003)
2003	Northern Colorado	9–2					
Northern Colorado Bears (Great West Football Conference) (2004–2005)
2004	Northern Colorado	2–9	2–3	T–4th			
2005	Northern Colorado	4–7	0–5	6th			
Northern Colorado:		38–31	17–18				
Total:		71–43					
National championship Conference title Conference division title or championship game berth

=== Junior college ===
Year	Team	Overall	Conference	Standing	Bowl/playoffs
Trinidad Trojans (Empire Junior College Conference) (1958–1960)
1958	Trinidad		4–3	4th	
1959	Trinidad		6–0–1	T–1st	
1960	Trinidad		6–1	1st	
Trinidad:			14–4–1		
Total:					
National championship Conference title Conference division title or championship game berth
