= Bob Weber (American football) =

American football player and coach (1934–2008)

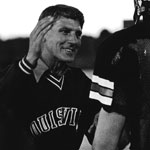

Biographical details
- Born: April 21, 1934
- Died: November 1, 2008 (aged 74); Tucson, Arizona, U.S.

Playing career
- 1951–1954: Colorado State
- Position: Center

Coaching career (HC unless noted)
- 1958–1960: Trinidad (assistant)
- 1961–1963: Trinidad
- 1964–1966: Colorado State (assistant)
- 1967–1968: Arizona (OC)
- 1969–1972: Arizona
- 1973–1976: Kansas State (OC)
- 1977–1979: Louisville (OC)
- 1980–1984: Louisville
- 1985: SMU (LB)
- 1988: Ottawa Rough Riders

Head coaching record
- Overall: 36–61 (college); 21–4–2 (junior college)

Accomplishments and honors

Championships
- 3 EJCC (1961–1963)

Robert Weber (April 21, 1934 – November 1, 2008) was an American gridiron football player and coach. He served as the head football coach at the University of Arizona from 1969 to 1972 and at the University of Louisville from 1980 to 1984, compiling a career college football head coaching record of 36–61.

Weber grew up on a farm near Fort Collins, Colorado and played center at Colorado State University from 1951 to 1954, earning all-Skyline Conference honors his final two years. After college, he played in the Canadian Football League (CFL) with the Edmonton Eskimos for a year before a water skiing injury ended his playing career. Weber began his coaching career at Trinidad State Junior College before becoming an assistant coach at Colorado State University.

Following his time at the University of Louisville, Weber served as an assistant coach at Southern Methodist University and Vanderbilt University before retiring in the mid-1990s. Weber died of pancreatic cancer on November 1, 2008.

== Head coaching record ==
=== College ===
Year	Team	Overall	Conference	Standing	Bowl/playoffs
Arizona Wildcats (Western Athletic Conference) (1969–1972)
1969	Arizona	3–7	3–3	5th	
1970	Arizona	4–6	2–4	5th	
1971	Arizona	5–6	3–3	3rd	
1972	Arizona	4–7	4–3	4th	
Louisville:		16–26	12–13		
Louisville Cardinals (NCAA Division I-A independent) (1980–1984)
1980	Louisville	5–6			
1981	Louisville	5–6			
1982	Louisville	5–6			
1983	Louisville	3–8			
1984	Louisville	2–9			
Louisville:		20–35			
Total:		36–61			

=== Junior college ===
Year	Team	Overall	Conference	Standing	Bowl/playoffs
Trinidad Trojans (Empire Junior College Conference) (1961–1963)
1961	Trinidad	7–2	6–1	1st	
1962	Trinidad	6–0–2	5–0–1	1st	
1963	Trinidad	8–2	3–0	1st	
Trinidad:		21–4–2	14–1–1		
Total:		21–4–2			
National championship Conference title Conference division title or championship game berth
