= 1919 Wyoming Cowboys football team =

American college football season

1919 Wyoming Cowboys football
- Conference: Rocky Mountain Conference
- Record: 3–5 (3–3 RMC)
- Head coach: John Corbett (4th season)
- Captain: Andrew W. Willis

1919 Rocky Mountain Conference football standings
	Conf.					Overall
Team	W		L		T	W		L		T
Colorado Agricultural $	7	–	1	–	0	7	–	1	–	0
Utah	4	–	1	–	0	5	–	2	–	0
Colorado College	3	–	1	–	1	4	–	2	–	1
Utah Agricultural	3	–	2	–	0	5	–	2	–	0
Wyoming †	3	–	3	–	0	3	–	5	–	0
Colorado	2	–	3	–	1	2	–	3	–	1
Denver	0	–	4	–	1	1	–	5	–	1
Colorado Mines	0	–	4	–	1	0	–	4	–	3
Montana State †	0	–	3	–	0	1	–	3	–	1
$ – Conference champion; † Ineligible for conference title

The 1919 Wyoming Cowboys football team was an American football team that represented the University of Wyoming as a member of the Rocky Mountain Conference (RMC) during the 1919 college football season. In their fourth season under head coach John Corbett, the Cowboys compiled a 3–5 record (3–3 against conference opponents), finished fifth in the RMC, and were outscored by a total of 115 to 68. Andrew W. Willis was the team captain.

== Schedule ==
Date	Opponent	Site	Result	Source
September 27	Colorado Agricultural	Laramie, WY (rivalry)	L 0–28	
October 4	at Colorado Agricultural	Colorado Field; Fort Collins, CO	L 0–14	
October 11	Montana State	Laramie, WY	W 6–0	
October 18	Colorado Mines	Laramie, WY	W 16–6	
October 25	at Denver	Denver, CO	W 36–6	
November 8	Nebraska Wesleyan*	Laramie, WY	L 10–14	
November 15	at Creighton*	Omaha, NE	L 0–41	
November 20	Utah Agricultural	Laramie, WY (rivalry)	L 0–6	
*Non-conference game
