= 1919 Montana State Bobcats football team =

American college football season

1919 Montana State Bobcats football
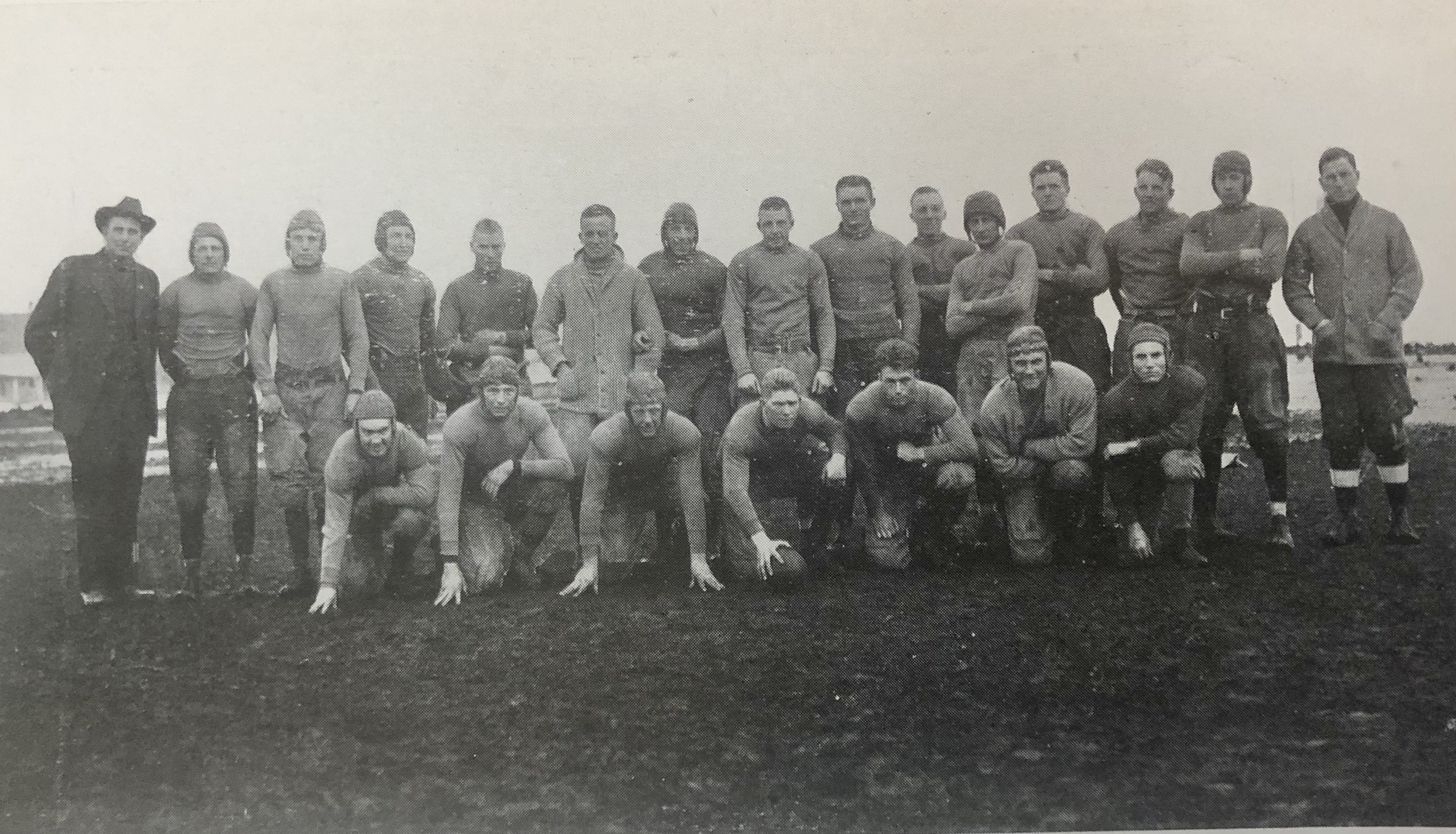
- The "Regulars" from the 1919 football team
- Conference: Rocky Mountain Conference
- Record: 1–3–1 (0–3 RMC)
- Head coach: Walter D. Powell (1st season)
- Captain: Homer Taylor

1919 Rocky Mountain Conference football standings
	Conf.					Overall
Team	W		L		T	W		L		T
Colorado Agricultural $	7	–	1	–	0	7	–	1	–	0
Utah	4	–	1	–	0	5	–	2	–	0
Colorado College	3	–	1	–	1	4	–	2	–	1
Utah Agricultural	3	–	2	–	0	5	–	2	–	0
Wyoming †	3	–	3	–	0	3	–	5	–	0
Colorado	2	–	3	–	1	2	–	3	–	1
Denver	0	–	4	–	1	1	–	5	–	1
Colorado Mines	0	–	4	–	1	0	–	4	–	3
Montana State †	0	–	3	–	0	1	–	3	–	1
$ – Conference champion; † Ineligible for conference title

The 1919 Montana State Bobcats football team was an American football team that represented the Montana State College (later renamed Montana State University) as a member of the Rocky Mountain Conference (RMC) during the 1919 college football season. In its first and only season under head coach Walter D. Powell, the Bobcats compiled a 1–3–1 record (0–3 against RMC opponents) and was outscored by a total of 97 to 49.

Homer Taylor was the team captain.

== Schedule ==
Date	Opponent	Site	Result	Source
October 11	vs. Wyoming	Casper, WY	L 0–6	
October 18	Montana Mines*	Brewer Field; Bozeman, MT	W 43–0	
October 25	at Utah Agricultural	Adams Field; Logan, UT	L 0–19	
November 1	at Utah	Cummings Field; Salt Lake City, UT	L 0–66	
November 15	Montana*	Roundup Stadium; Bozeman, MT (rivalry)	T 6–6	
*Non-conference game

== Personnel ==
=== Players ===
The following players participated on the 1919 Montana State football team:

- Joe Bush
- Anker Christensen - center
- Devore
- Durkee
- Fred Finch
- Garven
- Norman Hibbert - lineman
- Kenneth King - halfback
- Victor Larse - lineman
- Ladimer Mashin - end
- George "Blubber" McFarlin
- Lloyd Morphy - tackle
- Henry Oberle - lineman
- Eugene Robertson
- Street
- Homer Taylor - quarterback and captain
- Willard Tobey - lineman
- Wakefield
- Wildman - lineman
- Ralph Winwood

=== Staff ===
- Walter D. Powell - coach
- Harold "Dick" Dickson - football manager
