= 1918 Colorado Mines Orediggers football team =

American college football season

1918 Colorado Mines Orediggers football

RMC champion
- Conference: Rocky Mountain Conference
- Record: 4–0 (2–0 RMC)
- Head coach: Irving J. Barron (1st season)

1918 Rocky Mountain Conference football standings
	Conf.					Overall
Team	W		L		T	W		L		T
Colorado Mines $	2	–	0	–	0	4	–	0	–	0
Denver	3	–	1	–	0	3	–	2	–	0
Colorado	1	–	2	–	0	2	–	3	–	0
Colorado College	1	–	2	–	0	1	–	2	–	0
Colorado Agricultural	0	–	2	–	0	0	–	2	–	0
$ – Conference champion

The 1918 Colorado Mines Orediggers football team was an American football team that represented the Colorado School of Mines in the Rocky Mountain Conference during the 1918 college football season. Under head coach Irving J. Barron, the team compiled a 4–0 record and won the conference championship.

== Schedule ==
Date	Opponent	Site	Result	Source
November 2	Camp Logan*		W 47–9	
November 9	at Denver	Denver, CO	W 48–6	
November 15	vs. Colorado College	Denver, CO	W 48–6	
November 23	Colorado Teachers*	Golden, CO	W 41–0	
*Non-conference game
