= 1919 Utah Agricultural Aggies football team =

American college football season

1919 Utah Agricultural Aggies football
- Conference: Rocky Mountain Conference
- Record: 5–2 (3–2 RMC)
- Head coach: Dick Romney (1st season)
- Home stadium: Adams Field

1919 Rocky Mountain Conference football standings
	Conf.					Overall
Team	W		L		T	W		L		T
Colorado Agricultural $	7	–	1	–	0	7	–	1	–	0
Utah	4	–	1	–	0	5	–	2	–	0
Colorado College	3	–	1	–	1	4	–	2	–	1
Utah Agricultural	3	–	2	–	0	5	–	2	–	0
Wyoming †	3	–	3	–	0	3	–	5	–	0
Colorado	2	–	3	–	1	2	–	3	–	1
Denver	0	–	4	–	1	1	–	5	–	1
Colorado Mines	0	–	4	–	1	0	–	4	–	3
Montana State †	0	–	3	–	0	1	–	3	–	1
$ – Conference champion; † Ineligible for conference title

The 1919 Utah Agricultural Aggies football team was an American football team that represented Utah Agricultural College (later renamed Utah State University) in the Rocky Mountain Conference (RMC) during the 1919 college football season. In their first season under head coach Dick Romney, the Aggies compiled a 5–2 record (3–2 against RMC opponents), placed fourth in the conference, and outscored all opponents by a total of 234 to 44.

== Schedule ==
Date	Opponent	Site	Result	Source
October 11	Idaho State*	Adams Field; Logan, UT	W 136–0	
October 18	Montana*	Adams Field; Logan, UT	W 47–0	
October 25	Montana State	Adams Field; Logan, UT	W 19–0	
November 8	at Colorado Agricultural	Colorado Field; Fort Collins, CO	L 7–27	
November 15	at Colorado	Gamble Field; Boulder, CO	W 19–7	
November 20	at Wyoming	Laramie, WY (rivalry)	W 6–0	
November 29	at Utah	Cummings Field; Salt Lake City, UT (rivalry)	L 0–10	
*Non-conference game
