= Maurice Elder =

American football and baseball coach (1916–2011)

Biographical details
- Born: March 21, 1916; Wellington, Kansas, U.S.
- Died: August 14, 2011 (aged 95); Gilroy, California, U.S.

Playing career
- 1934–1936: Kansas State
- 1938–1940: Los Angeles Bulldogs
- Positions: Fullback, halfback

Coaching career (HC unless noted)

Football
- 1941–1942: Colorado A&M (assistant)
- 1946: Colorado A&M (assistant)
- 1947: Fort Lewis
- 1948–1951: Pueblo
- 1957–?: Gilory HS (CA)

Baseball
- 1947: Colorado A&M

Head coaching record
- Overall: 3–8 (college baseball); 18–26–2 (junior college football)

Accomplishments and honors

Awards
- First-team All-Big Six (1936); Second-team All-Big Six (1934)

Maurice "'Red" Elder (March 21, 1916 – August 14, 2011) was an American college football and college baseball coach. He served as the head football coach at Fort Lewis College in 1947 and Pueblo Junior College—now known as Colorado State University Pueblo (CSU Pueblo)—from 1948 to 1951. Elder was also the head baseball coach at Colorado State College of Agriculture and Mechanic Arts—now known as Colorado State University—for one season, in 1947.

Elder was a fullback at Kansas State University in the mid–1930s, where he played on the conference champion 1934 Kansas State Wildcats football team. He played in the East–West Shrine Bowl on January 1, 1937. Elder was selected by the Washington Redskins of the National Football League (NFL) in third round of the 1937 NFL draft with the 26th overall pick. He played professionally with the Los Angeles Bulldogs from 1938 to 1940. In 1941, Elder was hired by Colorado State College of Agriculture and Mechanic Arts—now known as an assistant football coach under head coach Harry W. Hughes.

Elder served in the United States Navy during World War II, from June 1943 until April 1946. After returning from the war, he resumed his role as assistant football coach at Colorado A&M in 1946. In May 1947, Elder was appointed head football coach and physical director at the Fort Lewis Branch of Colorado A&M—now known as Fort Lewis College. The following year, he moved on to Pueblo Junior College—now known as Colorado State University Pueblo—as head football coach.

In 1957, Elder was hired as the head football coach at Gilroy High School in Gilroy, California.

Elder was the maternal grandfather of NFL quarterback Jeff Garcia. He died on August 14, 2011, of a heart attack.

== Head coaching record ==
=== Junior college football ===
Year	Team	Overall	Conference	Standing	Bowl/playoffs
Fort Lewis Aggies (Colorado Junior College Conference) (1947)
1947	Fort Lewis	1–7			
Pueblo:		1–7			
Pueblo Indians (Colorado Junior College Conference) (1948–1951)
1948	Pueblo	7–2–1	4–1–1	2nd	
1949	Pueblo	5–3–1			
1950	Pueblo	4–6	3–2	3rd	
1951	Pueblo	1–8	1–4	5th	
Pueblo:		17–19–2			
Total:		18–26–2			
