= George W. Scott =

George W. Scott may refer to:

- George W. Scott (American football), American football and track and field coach
- George W. Scott (politician) (born 1937), American politician in the state of Washington
- George Washington Scott (1829–1903), industrialist and philanthropist, benefactor of Agnes Scott College
