= 1919 University of Utah football team =

American college football season

1919 University of Utah football
- Conference: Rocky Mountain Conference
- Record: 5–2 (4–1 RMC)
- Head coach: Thomas M. Fitzpatrick (1st season)
- Home stadium: Cummings Field

1919 Rocky Mountain Conference football standings
	Conf.					Overall
Team	W		L		T	W		L		T
Colorado Agricultural $	7	–	1	–	0	7	–	1	–	0
Utah	4	–	1	–	0	5	–	2	–	0
Colorado College	3	–	1	–	1	4	–	2	–	1
Utah Agricultural	3	–	2	–	0	5	–	2	–	0
Wyoming †	3	–	3	–	0	3	–	5	–	0
Colorado	2	–	3	–	1	2	–	3	–	1
Denver	0	–	4	–	1	1	–	5	–	1
Colorado Mines	0	–	4	–	1	0	–	4	–	3
Montana State †	0	–	3	–	0	1	–	3	–	1
$ – Conference champion; † Ineligible for conference title

The 1919 University of Utah football team was an American football team that represented the University of Utah in the Rocky Mountain Conference (RMC) during the 1919 college football season. In their first season under head coach Thomas M. Fitzpatrick, Utah compiled an overall record of 5–1 with a mark of 4–1 in conference play and outscored opponents by a total of 151 to 62.

== Schedule ==
Date	Opponent	Site	Result	Source
October 11	Colorado College	Cummings Field; Salt Lake City, UT	W 20–0	
October 18	at Colorado Agricultural	Colorado Field; Fort Collins, CO	L 21–34	
October 25	Idaho*	Cummings Field; Salt Lake City, UT	W 20–0	
November 1	at Montana State	Cummings Field; Salt Lake City, UT	W 66–0	
November 8	Colorado	Cummings Field; Salt Lake City, UT	W 7–0	
November 15	at USC*	Bovard Field; Los Angeles, CA	L 7–28	
November 29	Utah Agricultural	Cummings Field; Salt Lake City, UT (rivalry)	W 10–0	
*Non-conference game
