= 1919 Colorado Silver and Gold football team =

American college football season

1919 Colorado Silver and Gold football
- Conference: Rocky Mountain Conference
- Record: 2–3–1 (2–3–1 RMC)
- Head coach: Enoch J. Mills (2nd season)
- Captain: George Costello
- Home stadium: Gamble Field

1919 Rocky Mountain Conference football standings
	Conf.					Overall
Team	W		L		T	W		L		T
Colorado Agricultural $	7	–	1	–	0	7	–	1	–	0
Utah	4	–	1	–	0	5	–	2	–	0
Colorado College	3	–	1	–	1	4	–	2	–	1
Utah Agricultural	3	–	2	–	0	5	–	2	–	0
Wyoming †	3	–	3	–	0	3	–	5	–	0
Colorado	2	–	3	–	1	2	–	3	–	1
Denver	0	–	4	–	1	1	–	5	–	1
Colorado Mines	0	–	4	–	1	0	–	4	–	3
Montana State †	0	–	3	–	0	1	–	3	–	1
$ – Conference champion; † Ineligible for conference title

The 1919 Colorado Silver and Gold football team was an American football team that represented the University of Colorado as a member of the Rocky Mountain Conference (RMC) during the 1919 college football season. Head coach Enoch J. Mills led the team in his second and final year to an overall record of 2–3–1 and an identical mark in conference play, placing sixth in the RMC.

== Schedule ==
Date	Opponent	Site	Result
October 11	at Colorado Agricultural	Colorado Field; Fort Collins, CO (rivalry)	L 7–49
October 18	at Denver	Denver, CO	W 26–7
October 25	Colorado College^{†}	Gamble Field; Boulder, CO	T 14–14
November 8	at Utah	Cummings Field; Salt Lake City, UT	L 0–7
November 15	Utah Agricultural	Gamble Field; Boulder, CO	L 7–19
November 25	Colorado Mines	Gamble Field; Boulder, CO	W 33–0
^{†}Homecoming

== Players ==
- Alva R. Noggle - left end
- Wilbur Adams - left tackle
- Victor Adams - left guard
- W. B. Franklin- center
- Thomas Hogan - right guard
- Robert Muth - right tackle
- Robert Breckenridge - right end
- Chester Schrepferman - quarterback
- George Costello - left halfback
- Henry B. Abbett - right halfback
- James Brown - RW
- Raymond Savage - F
- Carl Fulghum - F
- Warren Thompson - G
- James Lee Willard - HB
- Robert Starks - HB
