= 1919 Colorado Agricultural Aggies football team =

American college football season

1919 Colorado Agricultural Aggies football

RMC champion
- Conference: Rocky Mountain Conference
- Record: 7–1 (7–1 RMC)
- Head coach: Harry W. Hughes (9th season)
- Home stadium: Colorado Field

1919 Rocky Mountain Conference football standings
	Conf.					Overall
Team	W		L		T	W		L		T
Colorado Agricultural $	7	–	1	–	0	7	–	1	–	0
Utah	4	–	1	–	0	5	–	2	–	0
Colorado College	3	–	1	–	1	4	–	2	–	1
Utah Agricultural	3	–	2	–	0	5	–	2	–	0
Wyoming †	3	–	3	–	0	3	–	5	–	0
Colorado	2	–	3	–	1	2	–	3	–	1
Denver	0	–	4	–	1	1	–	5	–	1
Colorado Mines	0	–	4	–	1	0	–	4	–	3
Montana State †	0	–	3	–	0	1	–	3	–	1
$ – Conference champion; † Ineligible for conference title

The 1919 Colorado Agricultural Aggies football team represented Colorado Agricultural College (now known as Colorado State University) in the Rocky Mountain Conference (RMC) during the 1919 college football season. In their ninth season under head coach Harry W. Hughes, the Aggies compiled a 7–1 record and outscored all opponents by a total of 218 to 57.

Three Colorado Agricultural players received all-conference honors in 1919: fullback Harry Scott, halfback Duane Hartshorn, and tackle H.L. (Hap) Dotson.

== Schedule ==
Date	Opponent	Site	Result	Source
September 27	at Wyoming	Laramie, WY (rivalry)	W 28–0	
October 4	Wyoming	Colorado Field; Fort Collins, CO	W 14–0	
October 11	Colorado	Colorado Field; Fort Collins, CO (rivalry)	W 49–7	
October 18	Utah	Colorado Field; Fort Collins, CO	W 34–21	
November 1	at Denver	Denver, CO	W 33–3	
November 8	Utah Agricultural	Colorado Field; Fort Collins, CO	W 27–7	
November 15	at Colorado Mines	Golden, CO	W 33–6	
November 27	at Colorado College	Colorado Springs, CO	L 0–13	
