= 1908–09 Baylor Bears basketball team =

American college basketball season

1908–09 Baylor Bears men's basketball
- Conference: Independent
- Record: 11-5 (11-5 Independent)
- Head coach: Enoch Mills

The 1908-09 Baylor Bears basketball team represented the Baylor University during the 1908-09 college men's basketball season.

== Schedule ==
Date time, TV	Opponent	Result	Record	Site city, state
	Waco HS	W 31-13	1-0	Waco, TX
	TCU	W 37-6	2-0	Waco, TX
	Mart YMCA	W 56-13	3-0	Waco, TX
	Waco YMCA	W 50-30	4-0	Waco, TX
	Waco YMCA	W 55-32	5-0	Waco, TX
	TCU	W 39-9	6-0	Waco, TX
	at Fort Worth YMCA	W 28-23	7-0	Waco, TX
	at Decatur College	L 18-20	7-1	Dallas, TX
	at Poly College	W 52-23	8-1	Waco, TX
	at Fort Worth YMCA	L 24-26	8-2	Waco, TX
	Decatur College	W 39-30	9-2	Waco, TX
	Decatur College	W 41-20	10-2	Waco, TX
	at Fort Sam Houston	W 35-18	11-2	Waco, TX
	at San Antonio HS	L 17-24	11-3	Waco, TX
	at San Antonio YMCA	L 34-36	11-4	Waco, TX
	at Texas	L 34-47	11-5	Austin, TX
*Non-conference game. (#) Tournament seedings in parentheses.
