= 1909–10 Baylor Bears basketball team =

American college basketball season

1909–10 Baylor Bears men's basketball
- Conference: Independent
- Record: 8-5 (8-5 Independent)
- Head coach: Enoch Mills

The 1909-10 Baylor Bears basketball team represented the Baylor University during the 1909-10 college men's basketball season.

== Schedule ==
Date time, TV	Opponent	Result	Record	Site city, state
	TCU	W 35-22	1-0	Waco, TX
	TCU	W 82-25	2-0	Waco, TX
	TCU	W 66-14	3-0	Waco, TX
	at Texas	W 31-28	4-0	Austin, TX
	at Fort Worth YMCA	W 37-14	5-0	Waco, TX
	at Decatur College	W 28-27	6-0	Dallas, TX
	at Decatur College	L 21-30	6-1	Dallas, TX
	at Decatur College	L 18-27	6-2	Dallas, TX
	at Poly College	L 27-28	6-3	Waco, TX
	at Fort Worth YMCA	L 28-31	6-4	Waco, TX
	Waco YMCA	W 39-36	7-4	Waco, TX
	Waco YMCA	W 36-24	8-4	Waco, TX
	Texas	L 37-40	8-5	Waco, TX
*Non-conference game. (#) Tournament seedings in parentheses.
