= 1918 Colorado Silver and Gold football team =

American college football season

1918 Colorado Silver and Gold football
- Conference: Rocky Mountain Conference
- Record: 2–3 (1–2 RMC)
- Head coach: Enoch J. Mills (1st season)
- Captain: Les Eastman
- Home stadium: Gamble Field

1918 Rocky Mountain Conference football standings
	Conf.					Overall
Team	W		L		T	W		L		T
Colorado Mines $	2	–	0	–	0	4	–	0	–	0
Denver	3	–	1	–	0	3	–	2	–	0
Colorado	1	–	2	–	0	2	–	3	–	0
Colorado College	1	–	2	–	0	1	–	2	–	0
Colorado Agricultural	0	–	2	–	0	0	–	2	–	0
$ – Conference champion

The 1918 Colorado Silver and Gold football team was an American football team that represented the University of Colorado as a member of the Rocky Mountain Conference (RMC) during the 1918 college football season. Led by first-year head coach Enoch J. Mills, Colorado compiled an overall record of 2–3 with a mark of 1–2 in conference play, trying for third place in the RMC.

== Schedule ==
Date	Opponent	Site	Result	Source
November 16	Colorado Teachers*	Gamble Field; Boulder, CO	L 0–9	
November 20	The Lieutenants*	Gamble Field; Boulder, CO	W 20–6	
November 23	at Denver	Denver, CO	L 0–6	
November 28	Colorado Agricultural	Gamble Field; Boulder, CO (rivalry)	W 16–13	
December 7	Colorado College	Gamble Field; Boulder, CO	L 7–8	
*Non-conference game
