= Marvin L. Kay =

American football coach (1939–2023)

Biographical details
- Born: February 17, 1939; Denver, Colorado, U.S.
- Died: May 19, 2023 (aged 84); Golden, Colorado, U.S.
- Education: Colorado School of Mines (1963)

Playing career
- 1958–1962: Colorado Mines
- Position: Lineman

Coaching career (HC unless noted)
- 1966–1968: Colorado Mines (assistant)
- 1969–1994: Colorado Mines

Administrative career (AD unless noted)
- 1995–2004: Colorado Mines

Head coaching record
- Overall: 84–157–6

Marvin Lester Kay (February 17, 1939 – April 19, 2023) was an American college football coach. He was the head football coach and athletic director for the Colorado School of Mines, holding the position of head football coach from 1969 to 1994 and athletic director from 1995 to 2004. He played college football for Colorado Mines as a lineman.

Kay served in the United States Army as a lieutenant from April 1964 to April 1966. He was also the 43rd mayor of Golden, Colorado, from 1988 to 1996. Colorado Mines' football stadium was dedicated in honor of Kay in 2015.

== Head coaching record ==
Year	Team	Overall	Conference	Standing	Bowl/playoffs
Colorado Mines Orediggers (Rocky Mountain Athletic Conference) (1969–1994)
1969	Colorado Mines	3–6	1–3	5th (Mountain)	
1970	Colorado Mines	1–9	1–5	T–6th (Mountain)	
1971	Colorado Mines	2–8	2–4	T–5th (Mountain)	
1972	Colorado Mines	4–5	3–3	4th	
1973	Colorado Mines	0–9	0–6	7th	
1974	Colorado Mines	3–6	2–4	T–6th	
1975	Colorado Mines	6–4	5–2	3rd	
1976	Colorado Mines	5–4	3–4	5th	
1977	Colorado Mines	3–7	2–7	T–7th	
1978	Colorado Mines	3–7	2–6	T–7th	
1979	Colorado Mines	6–4	5–3	3rd	
1980	Colorado Mines	4–5	3–5	T–5th	
1981	Colorado Mines	3–5–1	2–5–1	8th	
1982	Colorado Mines	2–7	1–7	9th	
1983	Colorado Mines	4–5	3–5	7th	
1984	Colorado Mines	3–7	2–6	T–6th	
1985	Colorado Mines	2–5–1	1–5–1	8th	
1986	Colorado Mines	3–5–1	1–4–1	6th	
1987	Colorado Mines	3–5–1	0–5–1	7th	
1988	Colorado Mines	3–7	0–5	T–4th	
1989	Colorado Mines	3–7	1–6	T–5th	
1990	Colorado Mines	5–5	1–3	T–3rd	
1991	Colorado Mines	6–4	3–3	T–3rd	
1992	Colorado Mines	4–6	2–5	6th	
1993	Colorado Mines	2–7–1	1–6	7th	
1994	Colorado Mines	2–6–1	0–6–1	8th	
Colorado Mines:		84–157–6	76–114–5		
Total:		84–157–6			
