= Irving J. Barron =

American football and basketball coach (1890–1979)

Irving Barron
Biographical details
- Born: November 11, 1890; Gordon, Nebraska, U.S.
- Died: August 18, 1979 (aged 88); Iowa City, Iowa, U.S.

Playing career

Football
- 1913–1915: Iowa

Coaching career (HC unless noted)

Football
- 1918: Colorado Mines
- 1924: Iowa (freshmen)

Basketball
- 1918–1919: Colorado Mines

Head coaching record
- Overall: 4–0 (football); 2–6 (basketball)

Accomplishments and honors

Championships
- Football; RMC (1918)

Irving John "Stub" Barron (November 11, 1890 – August 18, 1979) was an American college football and college basketball coach. He served as the head football coach at the Colorado School of Mines in Golden, Colorado in 1918, compiling a record of 4–0. Barron was also the head basketball coach at Colorado Mines in 1918–19, tallying a mark of 2–6.

Barron was born on November 11, 1890, in Gordon, Nebraska. He played football at the University of Iowa from 1913 to 1915, captaining the 1915 Iowa Hawkeyes football team. Barron also earned letters at Iowa in track and field and wrestling. He died on August 18, 1979, at Mercy Hospital in Iowa City, Iowa.

== Iowa career ==
Barron was born in Gordon, Nebraska, but his family moved to Iowa when he was young. He attended Correctionville High School in Correctionville, Iowa, before attending the University of Iowa from 1912 to 1916. Barron lettered in football at Iowa from 1913 to 1915, where he played the tackle position. As a junior in 1914, he broke his arm in a game against Cornell College, which ended his season. Still, several sources named him an All-Big Ten lineman for the 1914 season.

In his senior season, Barron was named the captain of the 1915 Hawkeye football squad. He was named a second team All-Western lineman that season. Barron also wrestled for three seasons at Iowa, winning the Big Ten Conference wrestling title at heavyweight in 1916.

== Coaching career and later life ==
Barron attended law school at Iowa for the next two years. After graduation, he became the head football coach for the Colorado School of Mines in 1918. Barron led them to an undefeated season in 1918 and the Rocky Mountain Athletic Conference championship. He later returned to Iowa City and was elected to the Iowa City town council. Barron also served as Iowa's freshman coach in 1924. He was elected to the University of Iowa Athletics Hall of Fame in 1998.

== Head coaching record ==
=== Football ===
Year	Team	Overall	Conference	Standing	Bowl/playoffs
Colorado Mines Orediggers (Rocky Mountain Conference) (1918)
1918	Colorado Mines	4–0	2–0	1st	
Colorado Mines:		4–0	2–0		
Total:		4–0			
National championship Conference title Conference division title or championship game berth
