= Walter D. Powell =

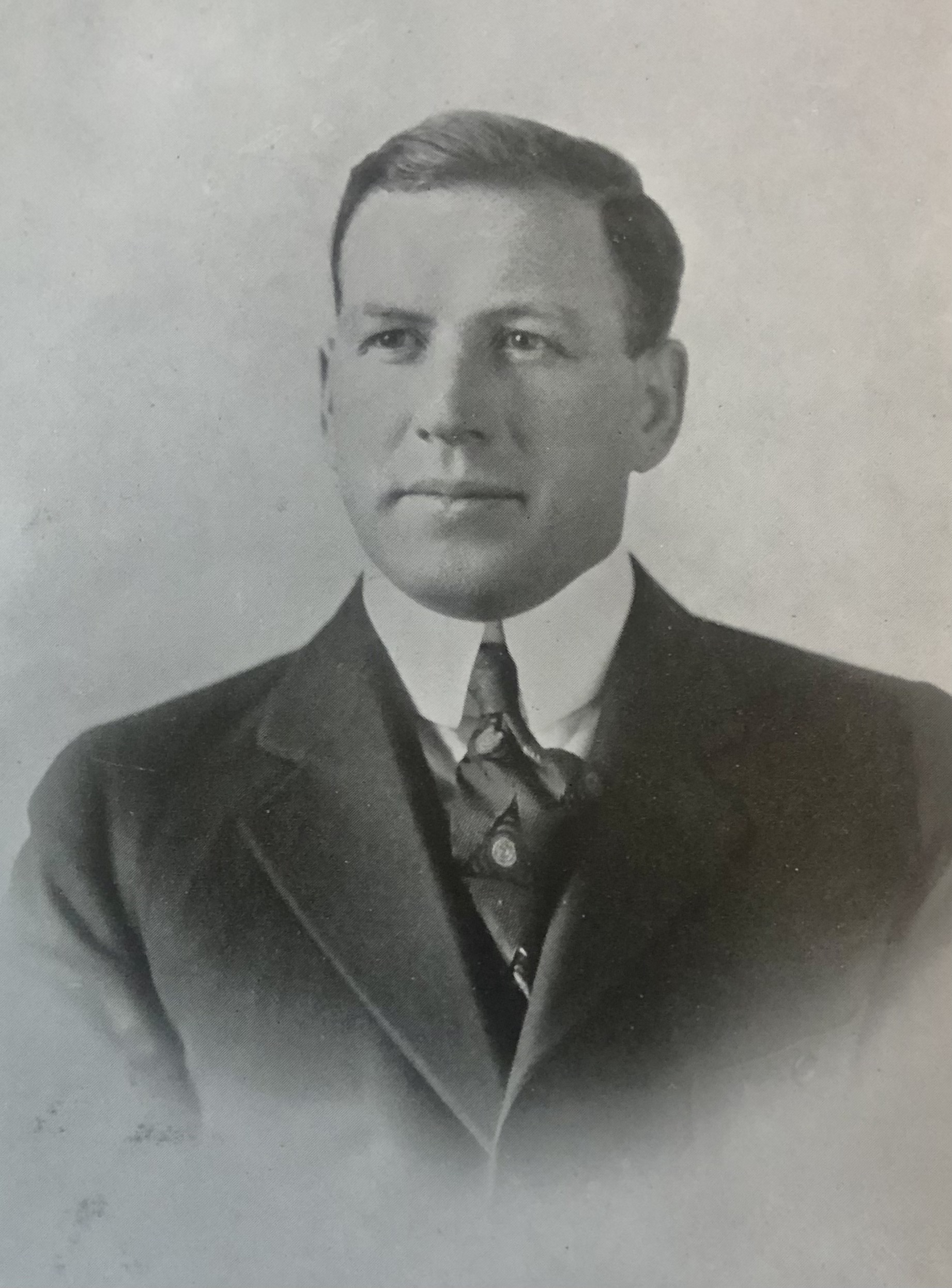

Biographical details
- Born: July 15, 1891; Reedsburg, Wisconsin, U.S.
- Died: September 15, 1967 (aged 76); Gastonia, North Carolina, U.S.

Playing career

Football
- 1912–1913: Wisconsin

Coaching career (HC unless noted)

Football
- 1914–1916: Western Reserve
- 1919: Montana State
- 1920: Stanford

Basketball
- 1914–1917: Western Reserve
- 1919–1920: Montana State
- 1920–1921: Stanford

Baseball
- 1915: Western Reserve

Head coaching record
- Overall: 19–21–1 (football); 36–27 (basketball); 5–3 (baseball)

Accomplishments and honors

Championships
- Football; 1 OAC (1915)

Walter Daniel Powell (July 15, 1891 – September 15, 1967) was an American football player and coach of football, basketball, and baseball.

Powell was born in Reedsburg, Wisconsin. He played college football at the University of Wisconsin from 1912 to 1913. He coached several sports at Western Reserve University from 1914 to 1917, amassing an overall 14–15 record in football, 18–24 record in basketball, and a 5–3 record in baseball.

In 1917, Powell served as athletic director at Camp Sherman. From 1917 to 1919, he served as head coach of the Naval Training Station in Charleston, South Carolina.

Powell coached one season at the Montana College of Agriculture and Mechanic Arts—now known as Montana State University, from 1919 to 1920, where his football record was 1–3–1 and his basketball record was a perfect 13–0. From 1920 to 1921, Powell coached Stanford University's football and basketball teams, where he compiled a football record of 4–3 and a basketball record of 15–3.

Powell later moved to Atlanta and went into business. He was also a football official for the Southeastern Conference (SEC) and officiated a number of Rose Bowls. Powell died on September 15, 1967, at a hospital in Gastonia, North Carolina.

== Head coaching record ==
=== Football ===
Year	Team	Overall	Conference	Standing	Bowl/playoffs
Western Reserve (Ohio Athletic Conference) (1914–1916)
1914	Western Reserve	4–6	2–4	9th	
1915	Western Reserve	7–2	6–1	1st	
1916	Western Reserve	3–7	3–4	8th	
Western Reserve:		14–15	11–9		
Montana State Bobcats (Rocky Mountain Conference) (1919)
1919	Montana State	1–3–1	0–3	NA	
Montana State:		1–3–1	0–3		
Stanford (Pacific Coast Conference) (1920)
1920	Stanford	4–3	2–1	2nd	
Stanford:		4–3	2–1		
Total:		19–21–1			
National championship Conference title Conference division title or championship game berth
