= 1918 Colorado Agricultural Aggies football team =

American college football season

1918 Colorado Agricultural Aggies football
- Conference: Rocky Mountain Conference
- Record: 0–2 (0–2 RMC)
- Head coach: Harry W. Hughes (8th season)

1918 Rocky Mountain Conference football standings
	Conf.					Overall
Team	W		L		T	W		L		T
Colorado Mines $	2	–	0	–	0	4	–	0	–	0
Denver	3	–	1	–	0	3	–	2	–	0
Colorado	1	–	2	–	0	2	–	3	–	0
Colorado College	1	–	2	–	0	1	–	2	–	0
Colorado Agricultural	0	–	2	–	0	0	–	2	–	0
$ – Conference champion

The 1918 Colorado Agricultural Aggies football team represented Colorado Agricultural College (now known as Colorado State University) in the Rocky Mountain Conference (RMC) during the 1918 college football season. In their eighth season under head coach Harry W. Hughes, the Aggies compiled a 0–2 record, finished last in the RMC, and were outscored by a total of 30 to 13.

== Schedule ==
Date	Opponent	Site	Result	Source
November 16	at Denver	Denver, CO	L 0–14	
November 28	at Colorado	Gamble Field; Boulder, CO (rivalry)	L 13–16	
