= Elmer Capshaw =

American football player and sports coach (1893–1953)

Biographical details
- Born: November 27, 1893; Norman, Oklahoma, U.S.
- Died: April 13, 1953 (aged 59); Norman, Oklahoma, U.S.

Playing career

Football
- 1912–1915: Oklahoma
- Position: Halfback

Coaching career (HC unless noted)

Football
- 1921–1922: Colorado Mines

Basketball
- 1921–1922: Colorado Mines

Head coaching record
- Overall: 5–7–1 (Football)

Elmer "Trim" Capshaw (November 27, 1893 – April 13, 1953) was an American college football player and coach of college football and college basketball. He served as the head football coach at the Colorado School of Mines in Golden, Colorado from 1921 to 1922. Capshaw was also the head basketball coach at Colorado Mines in 1921–22. He played football at the University of Oklahoma from 1912 to 1915.

== Head coaching record ==
=== Football ===
Year	Team	Overall	Conference	Standing
Colorado Mines Orediggers (Rocky Mountain Conference) (1921–1922)
1921	Colorado Mines	1–5	1–5	8th
1922	Colorado Mines	4–2–1	4–2–1	4th
Colorado Mines:		5–7–1	5–7–1	
Total:		5–7–1		
