= Joan Birkland =

American athlete and women's sports advocate (1928–2019)

- Born: Joan Packard; November 28, 1928; Denver, Colorado, U.S.
- Died: June 15, 2019 (aged 90)
- Occupations: Amateur tennis player, golfer, women's sports advocate
- Known for: Colorado state women's amateur tennis and golf champion
- Spouse: Ormand Birkland

Joan Packard Birkland (November 17, 1928 – June 15, 2019) was an American athlete and women's sports advocate. Considered one of Colorado's greatest all-around athletes, she earned multiple titles in women's amateur tennis and golf championships at the city and state level. Following her retirement from competition, she served on numerous sports boards and became involved in sports education for disabled youth. She was inducted into the Colorado Golf Hall of Fame in 1977, the Colorado Sports Hall of Fame in 1981, the Colorado Women's Hall of Fame in 1996, and the Colorado Tennis Hall of Fame in 2001.

== Early life and education ==
Joan Packard was born in Denver, Colorado, on November 17, 1928, to Dr. George Packard, a surgeon. She was the second of three girls. She gained her early athletic practice playing baseball, football, basketball and tennis with other children in nearby City Park, but due to the absence of organized sports for high school girls, she did not compete formally until university. She graduated from East High School in 1946 and went on to Colorado University, where she met her husband, Ormand Birkland. They married in 1948.

In university she played for an Amateur Athletic Union basketball team called the Denver Viners. After meeting her husband, who enjoyed golf, she took up that sport as well.

== Career ==
Birkland began competing in tennis championships at the city and state level in the 1960s. She won the Denver amateur singles title in 1960, 1961, and 1965, and the Colorado state tennis title in 1960, 1962, and 1966. She won a total of six singles and 15 doubles titles in Colorado and Intermountain tennis tournaments.

In 1962 she accepted her friends' challenge to compete in both the state tennis and state golf championships in the same summer, and won both titles. She repeated this feat in 1966. Between 1960 and 1966 she won seven state golf championships. She also participated in the skiing and bowling teams at the Denver Country Club.

In recognition of her golfing ability, the Denver Country Club hosted a "Beat Joanie Day" at the end of each season for a six-year period. The challenge was open to any other member, but Birkland always won the match. She finished first in the club's golf tournaments for 30 consecutive years.

After retiring from competition, Birkland became a women's sports advocate and instructor for disabled youth. In the 1990s she and Dorothy Mauk resuscitated the Sportswomen of Colorado awards program, for which she serves as executive director. She was a golf instructor in the amputee program at Children's Hospital, a basketball teacher for children with asthma, and a bowling instructor for children with cerebral palsy.

== Affiliations and memberships ==
Birkland served two terms as chairman of the USGA Women's Committee, which oversees seven annual women's USGA tournaments. She was president of the Denver Tennis Club from 1991 to 1992. She has served on many sports boards of directors, including Pioneer Sportswomen at the University of Denver, Boys and Girls Clubs of Metro Denver, Hospice of Metro Denver, Institute of Health Education, Colorado Xplosion women's basketball team, and Girls in Golf. She also served on the board of directors of the Colorado Golf Hall of Fame and Colorado Sports Hall of Fame.

== Awards and honors ==
In 1962, after winning both the state tennis and state golf championships in the same summer, Birkland received the Robert Russell award as Colorado amateur athlete of the year. She was inducted into the Colorado Golf Hall of Fame in 1977, the Colorado Sports Hall of Fame in 1981, and the Colorado Women's Hall of Fame in 1996. She is considered one of the greatest all-around athletes in Colorado's history because of her awards in basketball, tennis, and golf.

The Joan Birkland Pavilion at the Gates Tennis Center in Denver, headquarters of USTA Colorado, was named in her honor.

== Sources ==
- Brown, Irv; Williams, Joe (2008). The Great Book of Denver Sports Lists. Hachette UK. ISBN 978-0786741687.
- Varnell, Jeanne (1999). Women of Consequence: The Colorado Women's Hall of Fame. Big Earth Publishing. ISBN 1555662145.
