= Western Nebraska Community College =

Public community college in Scottsbluff, Nebraska, US

- Motto: The Place to Be
- Type: Public community college
- Established: 1926
- Academic affiliations: Space-grant
- President: Greg Dart
- Location: Scottsbluff, Nebraska, United States; 41°52′27″N 103°38′33″W
- Campus: Rural
- Colors: Blue and Gold
- Mascot: Cougars
- Website: www.wncc.edu

Western Nebraska Community College (WNCC) is a public community college in Scottsbluff, Nebraska. It also has campuses in Sidney and Alliance. WNCC was founded in 1926 as the Scottsbluff Junior College. The college assumed its current name in 1988. Its athletics teams are known as the Cougars.

== History ==
Western Nebraska Community College was originally established as the Scottsbluff Junior College in 1926. It was an extension of the University of Nebraska system made to reduce the over-crowding of other colleges at the time. After only one year in operation, the school board closed the school in 1927. Two years later, the college was re-established as a separate entity. In 1932, following a special election, Scottsbluff Junior College was officially made a public college.

In 1968, the college officially changed its name to Nebraska Western College. Additionally, the college announced the construction of a new multi-purpose main building, which opened the following year. The college became Scottsbluff's only non-parochial institution of higher education after private Hiram Scott College shut down in 1971. That same year, the Nebraska State Legislature passed a bill creating eight technical community college areas. The college was added to the Western Nebraska Technical Community College Area in 1973.

In 1982, the college purchased the Alliance Vocational School of Practical Nursing, located in Alliance. In 1988, Nebraska Western College merged with Western Nebraska Technical College, located in Sidney. The resulting organization became Western Nebraska Community College, which began operations in July of that same year.

In 2017, the college began renovations of their main campus. Additionally, a new performing arts theater, learning commons, and welcome center also began construction. Construction was completed in 2019.

== Academics ==
Undergraduate demographics as of 2025
Race and ethnicity	Total
White	55%
Hispanic	27%
Asian	1%
Native American	2%
Black	3%
International student	9%
Unknown	3%
Economic diversity
Low-income (Note: The percentage of students who received an income-based federal Pell grant intended for low-income students.)	45%
Affluent (Note: The percentage of students who are a part of the American middle class at the bare minimum.)	55%

Western Nebraska Community College is a public community college. As of 2025, 950 students go to the college. The college includes 61 fields of study. Major Fields of Study include Business Administration, Registered Nursing, Teacher Education and Professional Development, Electrical Power and Transmission Installation, and Vehicle Maintenance and Repair Technologies.

== Campuses ==
Western Nebraska Community College's main campus is in Scottsbluff. The college also has campuses in Sidney and Alliance. The Scottsbluff campus is also used for administration and sports. The campus in Sidney includes the Aviation Maintenance program and the Innovation and Entrepreneurship. The Alliance campus was the original home of the nursing school and also includes the Power line & Construction Maintenance program.

== Notable alumni ==
- Bobby Jackson, professional basketball player
- Dick "Night Train" Lane, professional football player, Pro Football Hall of Fame inductee
- Sedric Toney, professional basketball player
