= George W. Scott (American football) =

American football and track coach (1889–1969)

Biographical details
- Born: February 22, 1889; Rapid City, South Dakota, U.S.
- Died: June 17, 1969 (aged 80); Fort Collins, Colorado, U.S.

Playing career

Football
- c. 1909: Spearfish Normal
- c. 1910: Colorado College

Track and field
- c. 1910: Colorado College

Coaching career (HC unless noted)

Football
- c. 1913–1933: Fort College HS (CO)
- 1934–1935: Colorado Mines
- 1936–1940: Trinidad State

Track and field
- c. 1913–1934: Fort College HS (CO)

Administrative career (AD unless noted)
- 1934–1936: Colorado Mines

Head coaching record
- Overall: 2–12 (college football); 116–8 (high school football)

George Washington Scott (February 22, 1889 – June 17, 1969) was an American football and track and field coach. He served as the head football coach at the Colorado School of Mines in Golden, Colorado from 1934 to 1935.

Previously, he had been a highly successful football and track coach at Fort Collins High School in Fort Collins, Colorado. Scott died on June 17, 1969, at his home in Fort Collins.

== Head coaching record ==
=== College football ===
Year	Team	Overall	Conference	Standing	Bowl/playoffs
Colorado Mines Orediggers (Rocky Mountain Conference) (1934–1935)
1934	Colorado Mines	1–6	1–6	T–9th	
1935	Colorado Mines	1–6	1–6	11th	
Colorado Mines:		2–12	2–12		
Total:		2–12			
