= Mid-Plains Community College =

Public community college in Southwest Nebraska, U.S.

Coordinates: 41.4012°N 99.6602°W

- Type: Public community college
- Established: 1973
- Location: North Platte, Nebraska, U.S.
- Campus: Rural
- Website: mpcc.edu
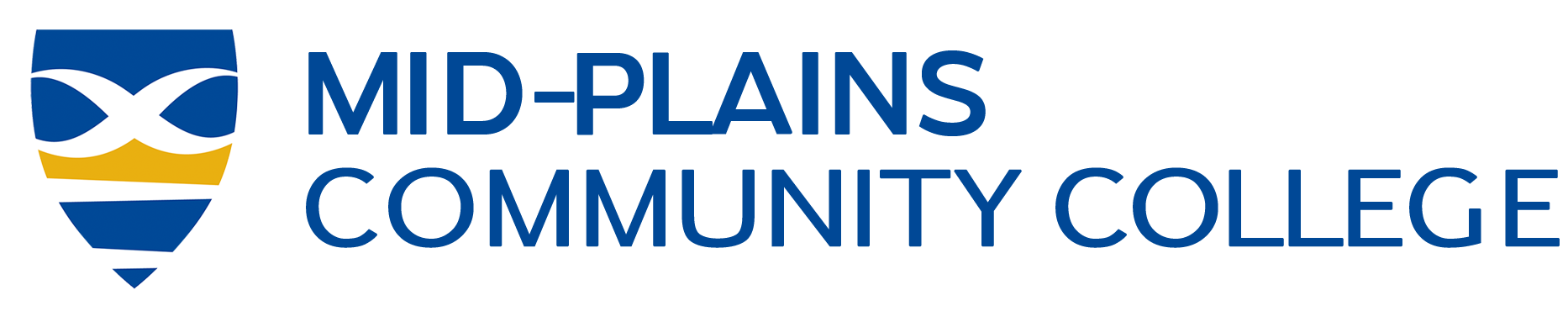

Mid-Plains Community College (MPCC) is a public community college in southwest Nebraska with seven campuses: one in McCook, two in North Platte, and four community campuses in Broken Bow, Imperial, Ogallala and Valentine. The college was established by the Nebraska Legislature in 1973.

== History ==
Mid-Plains Community College was announced in 1971 after the Nebraska State Legislature passed a bill creating eight technical community colleges across the state. The college was formed in 1973 from the merger of McCook Junior College, North Platte Junior College, and Mid-Plains Vocational Technical School. McCook Junior College was the first junior college in the state, and opened in 1926. In 1974, the college merged with North Platte Community College.

== Academics ==
Undergraduate demographics as of 2025
Race and ethnicity	Total
White	73%
Hispanic	11%
Asian	1%
Native American	1%
Black	3%
International student	7%
Unknown	1%
Economic diversity
Low-income (Note: The percentage of students who received an income-based federal Pell grant intended for low-income students.)	40%
Affluent (Note: The percentage of students who are a part of the American middle class at the bare minimum.)	60%

Mid-Plains Community College is a public community college. As of 2025, the college has an enrollment of 900 students. The college has 31 fields of study. Major fields of study include Liberal Arts and Sciences, Practical Nursing, Registered Nursing, Business Administration, and Vehicle Maintenance and Repair Technologies.

== Campuses ==
Mid-Plains Community College has four campuses. The main campuses are the North and South campuses in North Platte. The college also has campuses in Broken Bow, Imperial, Ogallala and Valentine.

== Athletics ==
Mid-Plains' campuses that sponsor athletics operate separate athletic programs, and neither plays games under the "Mid-Plains" name; the McCook campus plays as the McCook CC Indians, while the North Platte campuses complete as the North Platte CC Knights. Both are members of the Nebraska Community College Athletic Conference of the NJCAA.
