= Empire Junior College Conference =

Defunct college athletic conference

The Empire Junior College Conference (EJCC), also called the Empire Conference and the Empire College Conference (ECC), was a junior college athletic conference composed of member schools located in Colorado, Nebraska, New Mexico, and Wyoming. Original called the Colorado Junior College Conference (CJCC), the conference changed its name to the Empire Junior College Conference in 1952.

Casper College and McCook Junior College were admitted to the conference in May 1952. New Mexico Military Institute (NMMI) joined the EJCC in 1968 as a football-only member.

== Football champions ==
- 1948: Trinidad
- 1949: Fort Lewis
- 1950: Fort Lewis
- 1951: Mesa (CO)
- 1952: Scottsbluff
- 1953: Trinidad
- 1954: Trinidad
- 1955: Trinidad
- 1956: Mesa (CO)
- 1957: Trinidad
- 1958: Otero
- 1959: Otero and Trinidad
- 1960: Trinidad
- 1961: Trinidad
- 1962: Trinidad
- 1963: Trinidad
- 1964: McCook
- 1965: McCook
- 1966: McCook and Trinidad
- 1967: McCook and Trinidad
- 1969: Trinidad
- 1970: New Mexico Military

== Yearly football standings ==
1948 Colorado Junior College Conference football standings
	Conf.					Overall
Team	W		L		T	W		L		T
Trinidad $	5	–	1	–	0	8	–	2	–	0
Pueblo	4	–	1	–	1	7	–	2	–	1
Mesa (CO)	4	–	1	–	1	6	–	3	–	1
Fort Lewis	4	–	2	–	0	5	–	3	–	0
Lamar (CO)	2	–	4	–	0	3	–	7	–	0
Sterling (CO)	1	–	5	–	0	2	–	6	–	1
La Junta	0	–	6	–	0	0	–	7	–	1
$ – Conference champion

1950 Colorado Junior College Conference football standings
	Conf.					Overall
Team	W		L		T	W		L		T
Fort Lewis $	4	–	0	–	1	7	–	2	–	1
Mesa (CO)	3	–	1	–	1	5	–	2	–	1
Pueblo	3	–	2	–	0	4	–	6	–	0
Trinidad	2	–	3	–	0	?	–	?	–	?
Lamar (CO)	1	–	4	–	0	?	–	?	–	?
La Junta	1	–	4	–	0	?	–	?	–	?
$ – Conference champion

1951 Colorado Junior College Conference football standings
	Conf.					Overall
Team	W		L		T	W		L		T
Mesa (CO) $	5	–	0	–	0	8	–	0	–	0
Fort Lewis	3	–	2	–	0	4	–	4	–	0
La Junta	3	–	2	–	0	?	–	?	–	?
Trinidad	3	–	2	–	0	?	–	?	–	?
Pueblo	1	–	4	–	0	?	–	?	–	?
Lamar (CO)	0	–	5	–	0	?	–	?	–	?
$ – Conference champion

1952 Empire Junior College Conference football standings
	Conf.					Overall
Team	W		L		T	W		L		T
Scottsbluff $	5	–	0	–	1	?	–	?	–	?
Mesa (CO)	4	–	0	–	1	5	–	1	–	1
Fort Lewis	3	–	1	–	1	6	–	2	–	1
McCook	3	–	1	–	1	?	–	?	–	?
Sterling (CO)	4	–	2	–	1	?	–	?	–	?
Lamar (CO)	2	–	4	–	0	?	–	?	–	?
Pueblo	2	–	5	–	1	?	–	?	–	?
La Junta	1	–	5	–	0	?	–	?	–	?
Trinidad	1	–	7	–	0	?	–	?	–	?
$ – Conference champion

1953 Empire Junior College Conference football standings
	Conf.					Overall
Team	W		L		T	W		L		T
Trinidad $	6	–	0	–	1	?	–	?	–	?
Mesa (CO)	4	–	0	–	2	5	–	1	–	2
McCook	3	–	1	–	1	?	–	?	–	?
Pueblo	5	–	3	–	0	?	–	?	–	?
Sterling (CO)	3	–	2	–	2	?	–	?	–	?
Fort Lewis	2	–	2	–	0	2	–	5	–	0
La Junta	1	–	5	–	0	?	–	?	–	?
Scottsbluff	1	–	6	–	0	?	–	?	–	?
Lamar (CO)	0	–	6	–	0	?	–	?	–	?
$ – Conference champion

1954 Empire Junior College Conference football standings
	Conf.					Overall
Team	W		L		T	W		L		T
Trinidad $	7	–	0	–	0	10	–	0	–	0
McCook	6	–	1	–	0	?	–	?	–	?
Mesa (CO)	4	–	1	–	1	6	–	3	–	1
Fort Lewis	3	–	2	–	1	4	–	4	–	1
Pueblo	4	–	3	–	0	?	–	?	–	?
Northeastern (CO)	3	–	4	–	0	?	–	?	–	?
Lamar (CO)	1	–	5	–	0	?	–	?	–	?
Scottsbluff	1	–	5	–	0	?	–	?	–	?
La Junta	0	–	7	–	0	?	–	?	–	?
$ – Conference champion

1955 Empire Junior College Conference football standings
	Conf.					Overall
Team	W		L		T	W		L		T
Trinidad $	6	–	1	–	0	6	–	3	–	0
Fort Lewis	4	–	1	–	0	7	–	2	–	0
McCook	4	–	1	–	0	6	–	2	–	0
Scottsbluff	3	–	3	–	0	4	–	4	–	1
Pueblo	3	–	3	–	1	3	–	4	–	1
Mesa (CO)	2	–	3	–	0	6	–	3	–	0
La Junta	1	–	6	–	0	2	–	6	–	0
Northeastern (CO)	0	–	5	–	1	2	–	5	–	1
$ – Conference champion

1956 Empire Junior College Conference football standings
	Conf.					Overall
Team	W		L		T	W		L		T
Mesa (CO) $	6	–	0	–	0	7	–	2	–	0
Pueblo	5	–	1	–	0	?	–	?	–	?
McCook	5	–	1	–	0	?	–	?	–	?
Trinidad	2	–	4	–	0	?	–	?	–	?
Fort Lewis	2	–	3	–	0	3	–	6	–	0
Otero	3	–	4	–	0	?	–	?	–	?
Northeastern (CO)	1	–	5	–	0	?	–	?	–	?
Scottsbluff	0	–	6	–	0	?	–	?	–	?
$ – Conference champion

1957 Empire Junior College Conference football standings
	Conf.					Overall
Team	W		L		T	W		L		T
Trinidad $	6	–	1	–	0	?	–	?	–	?
McCook	5	–	1	–	0	8	–	2	–	0
Mesa (CO)	4	–	1	–	1	7	–	2	–	1
Fort Lewis	3	–	2	–	0	6	–	2	–	1
Otero	3	–	4	–	0	?	–	?	–	?
Pueblo	1	–	4	–	1	?	–	?	–	?
Scottsbluff	1	–	5	–	0	1	–	8	–	0
Northeastern (CO)	0	–	5	–	0	?	–	?	–	?
$ – Conference champion

1958 Empire Junior College Conference football standings
	Conf.					Overall
Team	W		L		T	W		L		T
Otero $	6	–	1	–	0	?	–	?	–	?
Mesa (CO)	4	–	1	–	0	8	–	3	–	0
Fort Lewis	4	–	2	–	0	8	–	2	–	0
Trinidad	4	–	3	–	0	?	–	?	–	?
McCook	3	–	3	–	0	6	–	4	–	0
Scottsbluff	2	–	4	–	0	?	–	?	–	?
Pueblo	2	–	5	–	0	?	–	?	–	?
Northeastern (CO)	0	–	6	–	0	?	–	?	–	?
$ – Conference champion

1959 Empire Junior College Conference football standings
	Conf.					Overall
Team	W		L		T	W		L		T
Otero +	6	–	1	–	0	?	–	?	–	?
Trinidad +	6	–	1	–	0	?	–	?	–	?
Mesa (CO)	4	–	2	–	0	8	–	2	–	0
McCook	3	–	2	–	1	?	–	?	–	?
Pueblo	3	–	3	–	1	?	–	?	–	?
Scottsbluff	2	–	4	–	0	?	–	?	–	?
Northeastern (CO)	1	–	6	–	0	?	–	?	–	?
Fort Lewis	0	–	6	–	0	0	–	8	–	1
+ – Conference co-champions

1960 Empire Junior College Conference football standings
	Conf.					Overall
Team	W		L		T	W		L		T
Trinidad $	6	–	1	–	0	?	–	?	–	?
McCook	4	–	2	–	0	8	–	2	–	0
Otero	4	–	3	–	0	5	–	4	–	0
Pueblo	4	–	3	–	0	?	–	?	–	?
Northeastern (CO)	3	–	4	–	0	?	–	?	–	?
Fort Lewis	2	–	4	–	0	3	–	7	–	0
Mesa (CO)	2	–	4	–	0	2	–	6	–	0
Scottsbluff	1	–	5	–	0	6	–	5	–	0
$ – Conference champion

1960 Empire Junior College Conference football standings
	Conf.					Overall
Team	W		L		T	W		L		T
Trinidad $	6	–	1	–	0	?	–	?	–	?
McCook	4	–	2	–	0	8	–	2	–	0
Otero	4	–	3	–	0	5	–	4	–	0
Pueblo	4	–	3	–	0	?	–	?	–	?
Northeastern (CO)	3	–	4	–	0	?	–	?	–	?
Fort Lewis	2	–	4	–	0	3	–	7	–	0
Mesa (CO)	2	–	4	–	0	2	–	6	–	0
Scottsbluff	1	–	5	–	0	6	–	5	–	0
$ – Conference champion

1961 Empire Junior College Conference football standings
	Conf.					Overall
Team	W		L		T	W		L		T
Trinidad $	6	–	1	–	0	7	–	2	–	0
McCook	5	–	1	–	0	9	–	1	–	0
Northeastern (CO)	5	–	2	–	0	?	–	?	–	?
Otero	4	–	3	–	0	?	–	?	–	?
Pueblo	3	–	4	–	0	?	–	?	–	?
Mesa (CO)	2	–	4	–	0	2	–	6	–	1
Fort Lewis	0	–	5	–	0	1	–	7	–	0
Scottsbluff	0	–	5	–	0	4	–	6	–	0
$ – Conference champion

1962 Empire Junior College Conference football standings
	Conf.					Overall
Team	W		L		T	W		L		T
Trinidad $	5	–	0	–	1	6	–	0	–	2
McCook	3	–	1	–	1	6	–	1	–	1
Mesa (CO)	3	–	2	–	0	6	–	3	–	0
Pueblo	3	–	3	–	0	5	–	3	–	0
Northeastern (CO)	3	–	3	–	0	3	–	5	–	0
Scottsbluff	0	–	4	–	0	4	–	4	–	0
Fort Lewis	0	–	4	–	0	2	–	6	–	0
$ – Conference champion

1963 Empire Junior College Conference football standings
	Conf.					Overall
Team	W		L		T	W		L		T
Trinidad $	3	–	0	–	0	8	–	2	–	0
Northeastern (CO)	2	–	1	–	0	?	–	?	–	?
McCook	1	–	2	–	0	4	–	3	–	0
Scottsbluff	0	–	3	–	0	?	–	?	–	?
$ – Conference champion

1964 Empire Junior College Conference football standings
	Conf.					Overall
Team	W		L		T	W		L		T
McCook $	3	–	0	–	0	7	–	2	–	0
Northeastern (CO)	2	–	1	–	0	5	–	4	–	0
Trinidad	1	–	2	–	0	4	–	6	–	0
Scottsbluff	0	–	3	–	0	3	–	5	–	0
$ – Conference champion
