= Charlie Parsons (footballer) =

Australian rules footballer

Personal information
- Full name: Charles Berry Parsons
- Born: 24 August 1903; Numurkah, Victoria
- Died: 12 July 1965 (aged 61); Warracknabeal, Victoria
- Original team: Warracknabeal
- Height: 183 cm (6 ft 0 in)
- Weight: 81 kg (179 lb)

Playing career^{1}
Years	Club	Games (Goals)
1929–1930	Carlton	33 (0)
1931–1934	Sturt	65 (7)
1935	Claremont	3 (2)

Representative team honours
Years	Team	Games (Goals)
	South Australia	8
- ^{1} Playing statistics correct to the end of 1935.

Charles Berry Parsons (24 August 1903 – 12 July 1965) was an Australian rules footballer who played with Carlton in the Victorian Football League (VFL).

== Family ==
The son of Edward Charles Parsons (1870–1938), and Clarissa Helen Wright (1871–1946), née Wright, Charles Berry Parsons was born at Numurkah, Victoria on 24 August 1903.

He married Maude Florence Lydia Bartell (1910–1997) at Perth on 5 October 1935.

== Football ==
Renowned for his skill and his fairness, he played at the highest level of Australian Rules football in three States — with Carlton in the VFL, with Sturt in the SANFL, and with Claremont in the WANFL — and, also, represented both the VFL and the SANFL in representative matches.

== Military service ==
He enlisted in the Second AIF in 1940, and had reached the rank of Lieutenant at the time of his discharge in 1945.

== Death ==
He died (suddenly) at his home at Warracknabeal, Victoria on 12 July 1965.
