= Charlie Parsons (baseball) =

American baseball player (1863–1936)

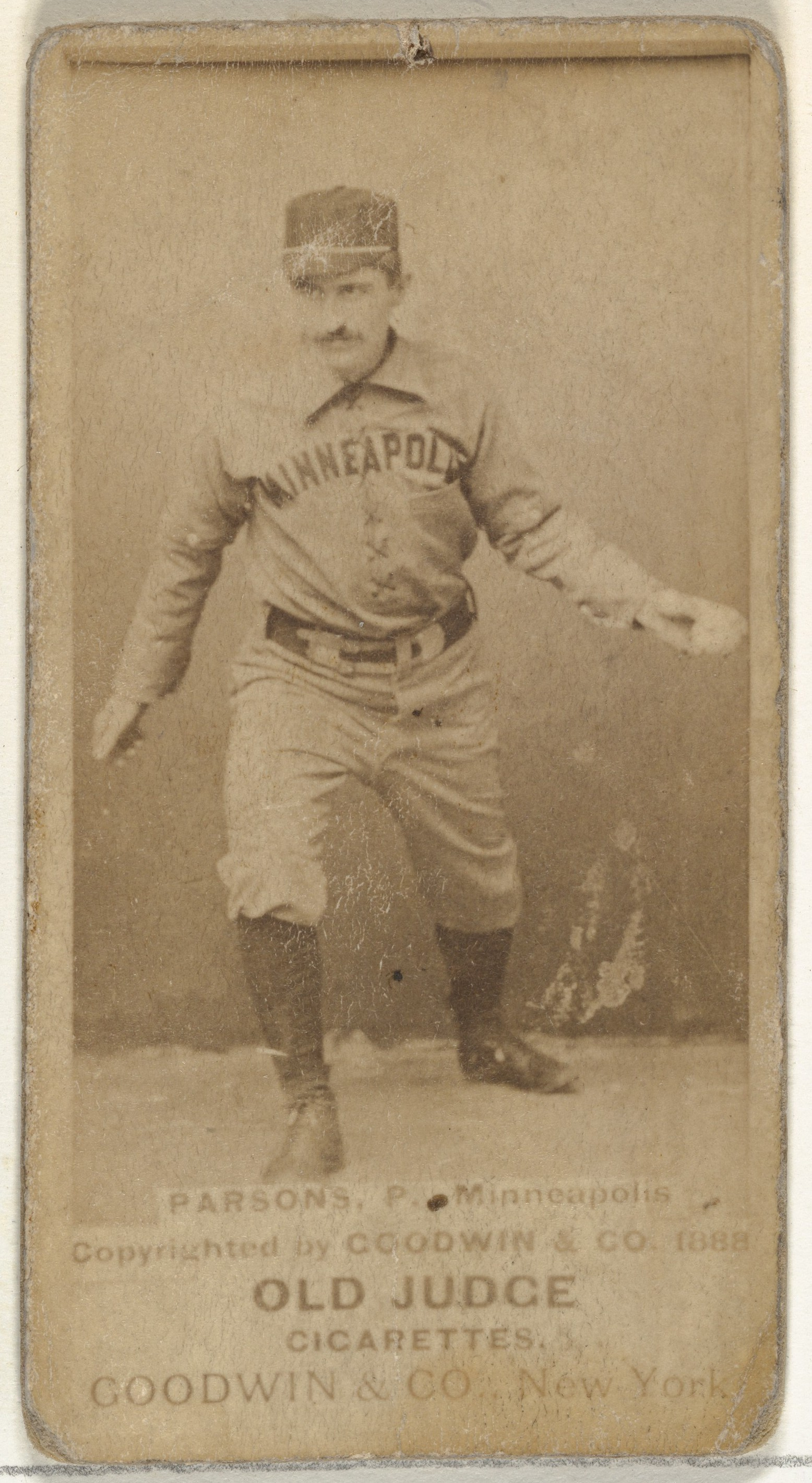
- Pitcher
- Born: July 18, 1863; Cherry Flats, Pennsylvania, U.S.
- Died: March 24, 1936 (aged 72); Mansfield, Pennsylvania, U.S.
- Batted: Left Threw: Left

MLB debut
- May 29, 1886, for the Boston Beaneaters

Last MLB appearance
- April 23, 1890, for the Cleveland Spiders

MLB statistics
- Win–loss record: 1-4
- Earned run average: 4.58
- Strikeouts: 12
- Stats at Baseball Reference

Teams
- Boston Beaneaters (1886); New York Metropolitans (1887); Cleveland Spiders (1890)

Charles James Parsons (July 18, 1863 – March 24, 1936) was an American Major League Baseball pitcher for the Boston Beaneaters, New York Metropolitans and Cleveland Spiders. He also played for a number of minor league teams between 1884 and 1889. On May 29, 1885, he pitched the first no hitter for the Birmingham Barons of Alabama in the Southern League.
