= Harry W. Hughes =

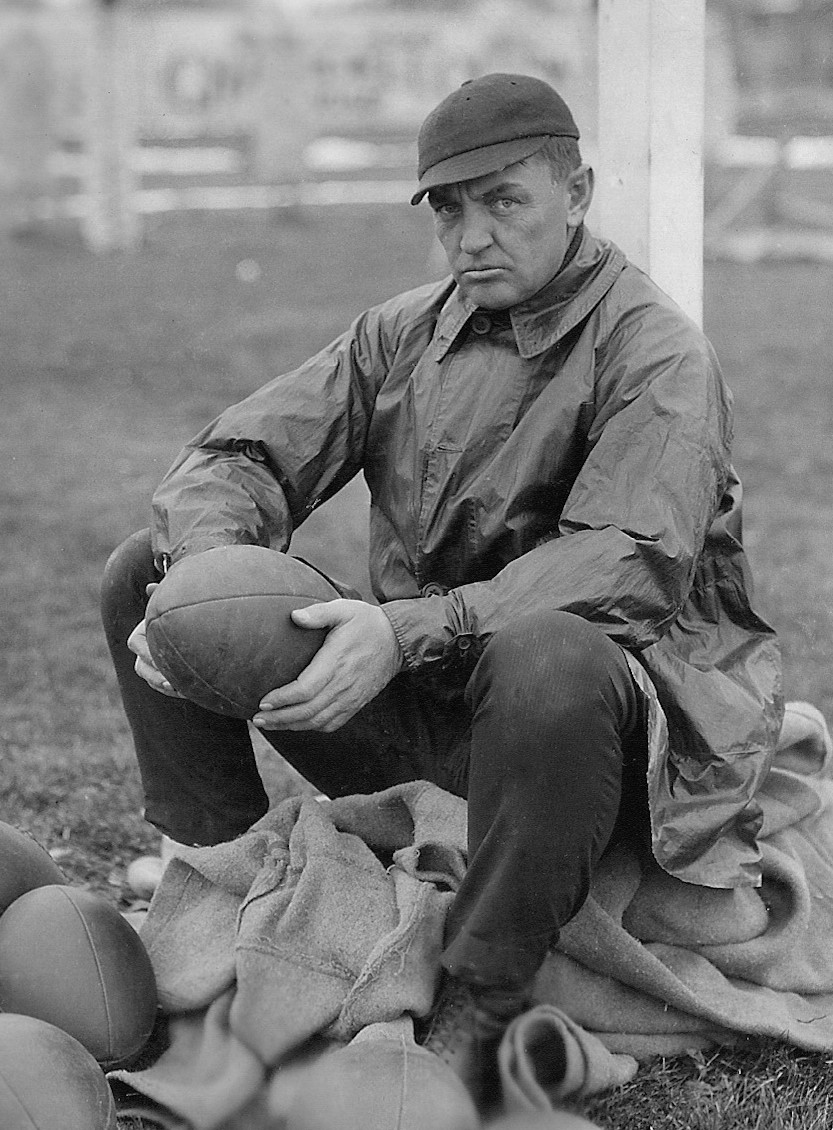
- Hughes as head coach at Colorado Agricultural

Biographical details
- Born: October 9, 1887; DeKalb County, Missouri, U.S.
- Died: July 26, 1953 (aged 65); Wheat Ridge, Colorado, U.S.

Playing career

Football
- 1904–1907: Oklahoma

Track and field
- 1904–1906: Oklahoma
- Positions: Halfback, quarterback

Coaching career (HC unless noted)

Football
- 1910: Oklahoma (assistant)
- 1911–1941: Colorado Agricultural/A&M
- 1946: Colorado A&M

Basketball
- 1911–1925: Colorado Agricultural

Administrative career (AD unless noted)
- 1911–1953: Colorado Agricultural/A&M

Head coaching record
- Overall: 126–96–18 (football); 60–79 (basketball)

Accomplishments and honors

Championships
- Football; 8 RMC (1915–1916, 1919–1920, 1925, 1927, 1933–1934)

Awards
- Helms Football Hall of Fame (1952); Colorado Sports Hall of Fame (1972); Colorado State University Sports Hall of Fame (1988)

Harry Walker Hughes (October 9, 1887 – July 26, 1953) was an American football player, coach of football, basketball, baseball, and track, and college athletics administrator. From 1911 to 1941, he served as the head football coach and athletic director at the Agricultural College of Colorado, renamed Colorado A&M in 1935 and now known as Colorado State University, compiling a record of 126–96–18.

== Early life and playing career ==
Hughes was born in Missouri to Roland and Lena Walker Hughes and raised in Norman, Oklahoma. He played football for the University of Oklahoma from 1904 to 1907, and was coached by Bennie Owen. He also was a member of the track and field team.

== Coaching career ==
Hughes coached the Norman High School football team in 1907 and returned to the University of Oklahoma as assistant coach under Owen in 1910. He accepted the position of athletic director and head football coach at Colorado Agricultural University in 1911 and turned a winless team in 1911 into conference champions with an undefeated record in 1915. Hughes also helped build Colorado Field, the first sodded football field in Colorado history, replacing Durkee Field (1899–1911). Colorado Field was the home of the Colorado Aggies and Colorado State Rams from 1912 to 1967.

Harry Hughes won eight conference championships in the Rocky Mountain Athletic Conference in 1915, 1916, 1919, 1920, 1925, 1927, 1933, and 1934. He was a member of the NCAA National Rules Committee beginning in 1926 until his retirement. Hughes coached the Aggies from 1911 to 1941 in football and remained as the Athletic Director until his retirement in 1953. In the early 1930s Hughes was given the nickname "Dean of American Football Coaches" by sportswriters and fellow coaches for his many seasons at one school. He was famously known as one of the most fair and sportsmanlike football coaches in America. He coached football from 1911 to 1941 and after resigning as football coach in 1946, he remained as the school's Athletic Director until 1953. Upon his retirement he was inducted into the Helms Football Hall of Fame on Harry Hughes Day, November 8, 1952.

Known as a tough but fair coach, Hughes was a strict disciplinarian who developed a play in 1914 known as the Million Dollar Play. This triple pass was an end around play based on the single wing formation and helped Hughes lead his teams to national fame. Some of Hughes' greatest players were Ralph "Sag" Robinson (All-American Honorable Mention 1916), Kenneth Hyde (1925 All-American 3rd team) and Glenn Morris (1936 US Olympic Decathlon Gold Medal winner). Hughes broke the color barrier in modern Colorado football in 1939 when he played John Mosley between 1939 and 1942.

Hughes retired from Colorado A&M College on July 1, 1953, after 42 years as Aggies coach and athletic director. He died 25 days later from a massive heart attack.

When Colorado State University built their new football stadium in 1968, it was named Hughes Stadium in his honor and became known as Sonny Lubick Field at Hughes Stadium. The stadium included a Harry Hughes Memorial Room dedicated in his memory for alumni to visit before games. The final game in the stadium was held on November 19, 2016, where the Rams defeated New Mexico 49-31. The Colorado State football program began play at on-campus Canvas Stadium beginning with the 2017 season, replacing Hughes Stadium. A street on the Fort Collins campus was renamed from "South Drive" to "Hughes Way" upon the stadium's closure in 2016 in order to continue honoring Hughes' name. Sonny Lubick Field at Hughes Stadium was demolished in 2018.

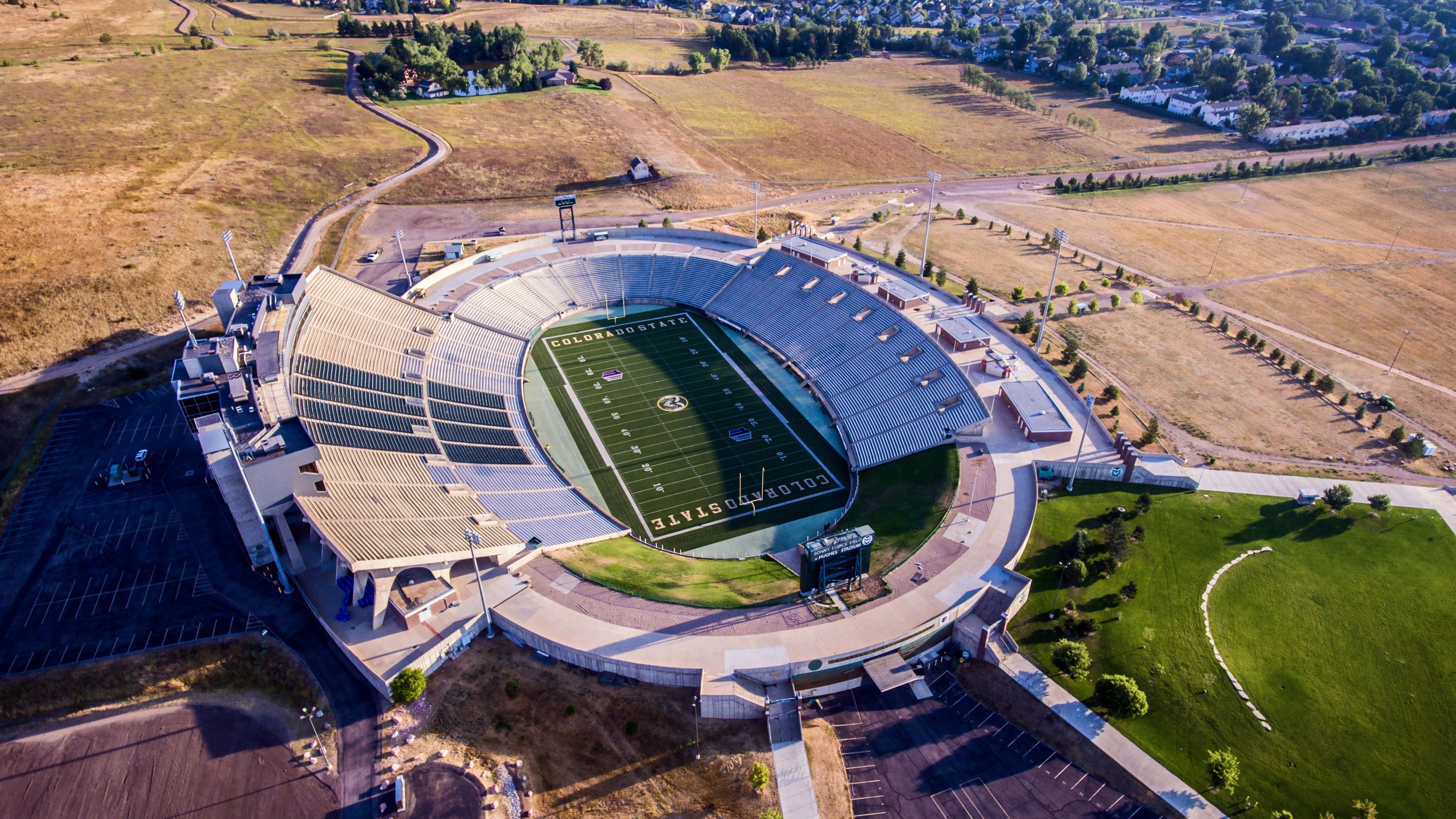
Sonny Lubick Field at Hughes Stadium in 2016.

== Head coaching record ==
=== Football ===
Year	Team	Overall	Conference	Standing
Colorado Agricultural/A&M Aggies (Rocky Mountain Conference) (1911–1937)
1911	Colorado Agricultural	0–6	0–5	7th
1912	Colorado Agricultural	3–2	3–2	3rd
1913	Colorado Agricultural	3–2	2–2	T–3rd
1914	Colorado Agricultural	3–4	3–3	4th
1915	Colorado Agricultural	7–0	7–0	1st
1916	Colorado Agricultural	6–0–1	6–0–1	1st
1917	Colorado Agricultural	1–7–1	0–7–1	9th
1918	Colorado Agricultural	0–2	0–2	5th
1919	Colorado Agricultural	7–1	7–1	1st
1920	Colorado Agricultural	6–1–1	6–0–1	1st
1921	Colorado Agricultural	2–3–1	2–2–1	T–4th
1922	Colorado Agricultural	5–2–1	5–1–1	2nd
1923	Colorado Agricultural	5–2–1	5–1–1	3rd
1924	Colorado Agricultural	4–2	3–2	T–2nd
1925	Colorado Agricultural	9–1	8–0	1st
1926	Colorado Agricultural	6–2–1	5–2	T–3rd
1927	Colorado Agricultural	7–1	7–1	1st
1928	Colorado Agricultural	6–2	6–2	3rd
1929	Colorado Agricultural	5–4	4–4	8th
1930	Colorado Agricultural	3–5–1	3–3–1	T–5th
1931	Colorado Agricultural	5–4	5–2	T–2nd
1932	Colorado Agricultural	4–3–1	4–3–1	5th
1933	Colorado Agricultural	5–1–1	5–1–1	T–1st
1934	Colorado Agricultural	6–2–1	6–1–1	T–1st
1935	Colorado A&M	3–4–1	2–4–1	9th
1936	Colorado A&M	4–4–1	3–4–1	T–7th
1937	Colorado A&M	1–7	1–6	11th
Colorado A&M Aggies (Mountain States Conference) (1938–1941)
1938	Colorado A&M	1–5–2	0–4–2	7th
1939	Colorado A&M	2–7	2–4	6th
1940	Colorado A&M	3–4–2	1–3–2	6th
1941	Colorado A&M	4–2–1	3–2–1	T–4th
Colorado A&M Aggies (Mountain States Conference) (1946)
1946	Colorado A&M	0–4	0–3	6th
Colorado A&M:		126–96–18	114–77–17	
Total:		126–96–18		
National championship Conference title Conference division title or championship game berth

=== Basketball ===
Record table
Season	Team	Overall	Conference	Standing	Postseason
Colorado Agricultural Aggies (Rocky Mountain Athletic Conference) (1911–1925)
1911–12	Colorado Agricultural	3–5	–		
1912–13	Colorado Agricultural	4–4	–		
1913–14	Colorado Agricultural	5–3	–		
1914–15	Colorado Agricultural	7–3	–		
1915–16	Colorado Agricultural	6–6	–		
1916–17	Colorado Agricultural	8–5	–		
1917–18	Colorado Agricultural	5–5	–		
1918–19	Colorado Agricultural	1–13	–		
1919–20	Colorado Agricultural	5–5	–		
1920–21	Colorado Agricultural	4–7	–		
1921–22	Colorado Agricultural	4–7	–		
1922–23	Colorado Agricultural	0–1	–		
1923–24	Colorado Agricultural	6–5	–		
1924–25	Colorado Agricultural	2–10	–		
Colorado Agricultural:		60–79 (.432)	– (–)		
Total:		60–79 (.432)			
National champion Postseason invitational champion Conference regular season champion Conference regular season and conference tournament champion Division regular season champion Division regular season and conference tournament champion Conference tournament champion

== See also ==
- List of college football head coaches with non-consecutive tenure
