= Enoch J. Mills =

American football, basketball, and baseball player and coach

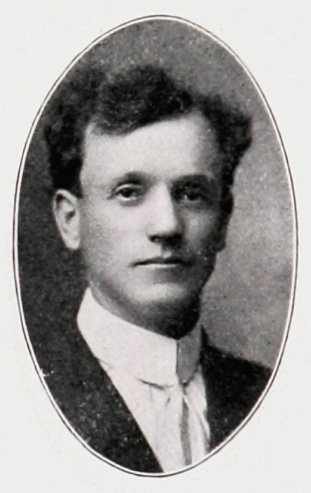
- Mills pictured in The Round Up-1911, Baylor yearbook

Biographical details
- Born: July 23, 1880; Pleasanton, Kansas, U.S.
- Died: October 3, 1935 (aged 55); Denver, Colorado, U.S.

Playing career

Football
- 1899–1901: Colorado Agricultural
- 1903: Denver
- 1904: Fort Worth

Baseball
- 1899: Colorado Agricultural
- 1901: Colorado Agricultural
- Positions: Quarterback (football); Center fielder (baseball)

Coaching career (HC unless noted)

Football
- 1904–1906: Fort Worth
- 1907: Polytechnic (TX)
- 1908–1909: Baylor
- 1918–1919: Colorado

Basketball
- 1907–1908: Polytechnic (TX)
- 1908–1910: Baylor
- 1918–1924: Colorado

Baseball
- 1907–1908: Polytechnic (TX)
- 1909: Baylor

Administrative career (AD unless noted)
- 1907–1908: Polytechnic (TX)
- 1908–1911: Baylor

Enoch Josiah "Joe" Mills (July 23, 1880 – October 3, 1935) was an American football, basketball, and baseball coach, college athletics administrator, author, naturalist, and hotelier. He served as the head football coach at Fort Worth University from 1904 to 1906, Polytechnic College—now known as Texas Wesleyan University—in 1907, Baylor University from 1908 to 1909, and the University of Colorado Boulder from 1918 to 1919.

== Early life and athletics career ==
Mills was born and raised on farm near Pleasanton, Kansas. He was the brother of Enos Mills, naturalist, author, and homesteader. Mills played college football at Colorado Agricultural College—now known as Colorado State University— from 1899 to 1901. He also played baseball at Colorado Agricultural as a center fielder in 1899 and 1901. Mills moved on to the University of Denver, quarterbacking the football team in 1903. He was elected captain for following season, but left for Fort Worth University in 1904, where he served as captain and coach of the football team. He remained as football coach at Fort Worth for the 1905 and 1906 seasons before leaving in 1907 for Polytechnic College—now known as Texas Wesleyan University—to serve as athletic director.

Mills married Ethel Steele, a former public school teacher in Fort Worth, Texas, on May 18, 1908.

Mills was hired as the athletic director at Baylor University in 1908. He was the eighth head football coach at Baylor University, serving for two seasons, from 1908 to 1909, and compiling a record of 8–8. He was also the second head basketball coach at Baylor, coaching two seasons, from 1908 to 1910, and tallying a mark of 19–10. In addition, he was the head baseball coach at Baylor in 1909, amassing a record of 9–12.

== Later life, death, and honors ==
Mills worked as a reporter for the Fort Worth Telegram and operated a number of resort hotels in Colorado. He helped to establish Rocky Mountain National Park in north-central Colorado. Mills died on October 3, 1935, in Denver, Colorado, after suffering a skull fracture in an automobile crash six days earlier. Joe Mills Mountain near Estes Park, Colorado in Rocky Mountain National Park is named for him.

== Head coaching record ==
=== Football ===
Year	Team	Overall	Conference	Standing	Bowl/playoffs
Baylor (Independent) (1908–1909)
1908	Baylor	3–5			
1909	Baylor	5–3			
Baylor:		8–8			
Colorado Silver and Gold (Rocky Mountain Conference) (1918–1919)
1918	Colorado	2–3	1–2	T–3rd	
1919	Colorado	2–3–1	2–3–1	6th	
Colorado:		4–6–1	3–5–1		
Total:					
