= Charles "Poss" Parsons =

American football player and coach (1892–1942)

Biographical details
- Born: May 3, 1892; Mason City, Iowa, U.S.
- Died: August 26, 1942 (aged 50); West Yellowstone, Montana, U.S.
- Education: University of Iowa

Playing career
- 1911–1914: Iowa

Coaching career (HC unless noted)

Football
- 1915–1916: Trinity College (IA)
- 1917: Colorado Mines
- 1919–1921: Colorado College

Basketball
- 1919–1922: Colorado College

Administrative career (AD unless noted)
- 1916–1917: Trinity College (IA)

Head coaching record
- Overall: 18–10–2 (football, excluding Trinity)

Accomplishments and honors

Championships
- 1921–1922 Colorado College Men's Basketball MSAC Regular Season Championship

Charles Lyman "Poss" Parsons (May 3, 1892 – August 26, 1942) was an American college football player and coach. He served as the Colorado School of Mines in 1916 and Colorado College from 1919 to 1921.

Parsons was the sports editor at the Denver Post from 1922–1941, and was posthumously inducted into the Colorado Sports Hall of Fame (Class of 1982).

Parsons died at his home in West Yellowstone, Montana, on August 26, 1942, at the age of 50.
