= Trinidad State College =

Community college in Trinidad, Colorado, US

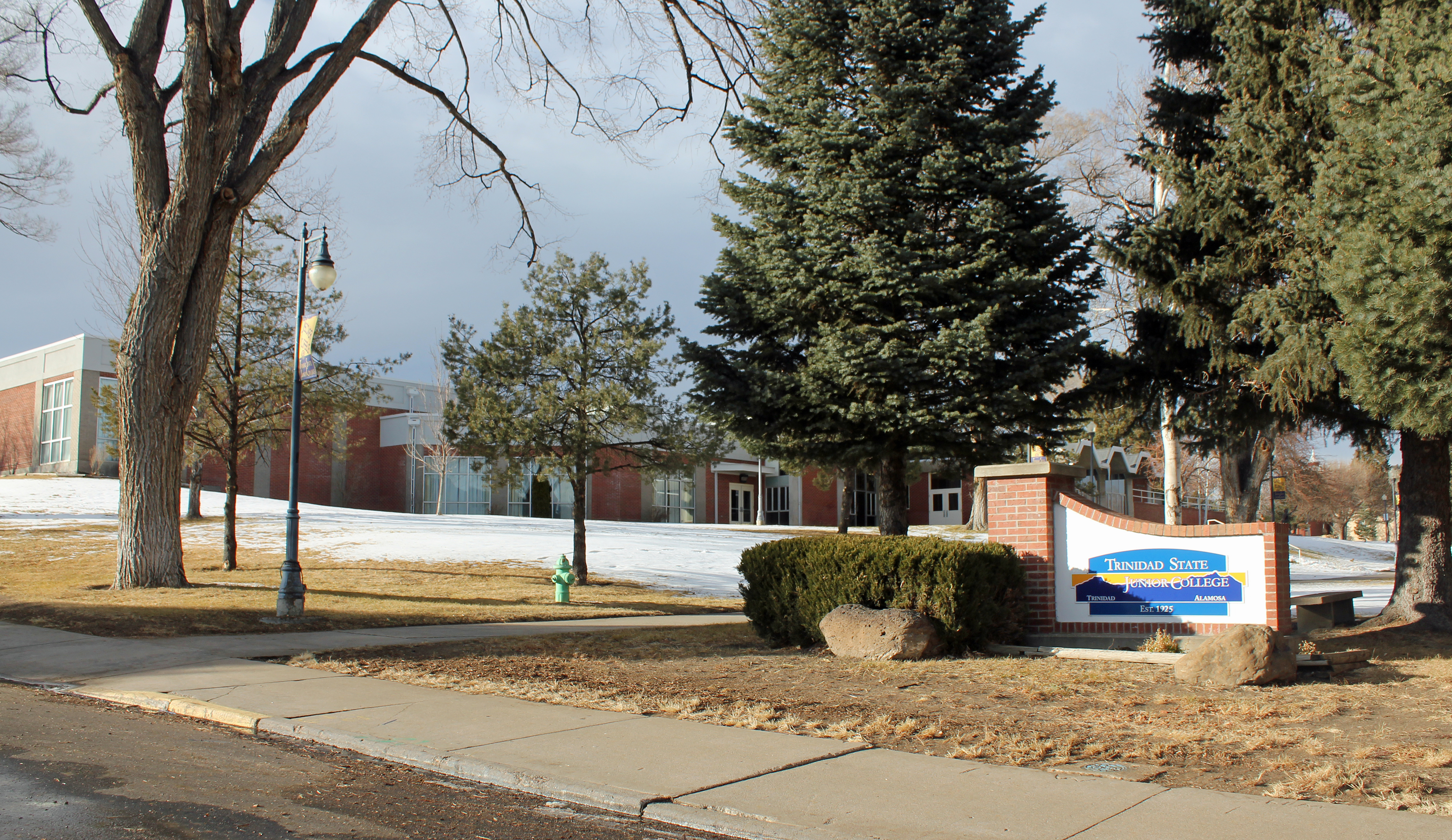
- A view of part of the campus.
- Former name: Trinidad State Junior College (1925–2021)
- Motto: Students First
- Type: Public community college
- Established: April 1925
- Parent institution: Colorado Community College System
- Academic affiliations: Space-grant
- Endowment: $6.04 million
- President: Dr. Dustin Eicke
- Students: 1,636 (fall 2023)
- Location: Trinidad, Colorado, United States; 37°10′22″N 104°30′46″W
- Colors: Blue and gold
- Nickname: TSC
- Mascot: Titus the Trojan
- Website: trinidadstate.edu

Trinidad State College is a public community college in Trinidad, Colorado. It was founded in 1925, making it the first community college in the state of Colorado. Trinidad State also operates a satellite campus in the city of Alamosa, Colorado, roughly 100 miles northwest of Trinidad. The college offers 49 degree programs in vocational fields. The college's name changed from Trinidad State Junior College to Trinidad State College in 2021.

== Academics ==
TSC offers courses in many diverse areas, including gunsmithing, aquaculture, cosmetology, welding, and nursing, as well as traditional arts and STEM subjects such as English, biology, and chemistry. Additionally, TSC trains first-responders with both an affiliated Emergency medical services training center in Grand Junction, Colorado, and its own on-campus Peace Officer Standards and Training program.

Trinidad State has been continually accredited by the Higher Learning Commission since 1962.

== Gunsmithing ==
TSC's gunsmithing school is one of only four accredited by the National Rifle Association of America (NRA), Trinidad State College offers an associate of applied sciences degree in gunsmithing. Also offered are several certificates, notably custom 1911 pistolsmithing. The gunsmithing program was started in 1947 by P. O. Ackley, known as the "father of modern reloading".

== Athletics ==
Trinidad State's athletic teams are known as the Trojans. As a member of the National Junior College Athletic Association (NJCAA), TSC offers 12 athletic programs, including:

- Esports
- Baseball
- Men's basketball
- Women's basketball
- Men's cross country
- Women's cross country
- Men's indoor/outdoor track & field
- Women's indoor/outdoor track & field
- Men's soccer
- Women's soccer
- Softball
- Volleyball

== Notable alumni ==
- Frank Clarke, football player
- Mark Grudzielanek, baseball player
- Spencer Haywood, basketball player
- Gayle Hopkins, track and field athlete
- Danny Jackson, baseball player
- Cody Jones, football player
- Kimmi Lewis, rancher and politician
- Devonte Upson, basketball player
- Larry Walton, football player
- Gary Weaver, football player
- Ken Bannister, basketball player
- Ainsley Ridgeway, Gunsmith
