= Colorado Mines Orediggers football =

Football team representing the Colorado School of Mines

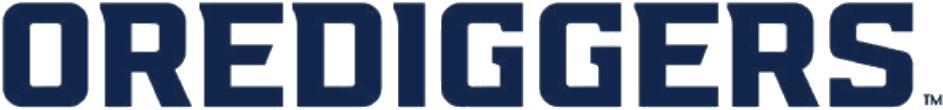
- First season: 1888; 138 years ago
- Head coach: Bob Stitt; 16th season, 129–76 (.629)
- Location: Golden, Colorado
- Stadium: Alumni Field (capacity: 4,000)
- NCAA division: Division II
- Conference: RMAC
- Colors: Silver and blue
- All-time record: 548–569–32 (.491)

Conference championships
- 25
- Website: minesathletics.com/football

The Colorado Mines Orediggers football team represents the Colorado School of Mines in the sport of American football. Bob Stitt has been the head coach since 2025, succeeding Pete Sterbick after the latter left to coach for Montana State as an offensive coordinator. Bob Stitt was previously the head coach from 2000 to 2014, returning for his 16th season in 2025. The football team has played in the Rocky Mountain Athletic Conference since 1909. They have won 23 conference titles, with 10 of them occurring prior to joining the RMAC (1888, 1890, 1891, 1892, 1893, 1897, 1898, 1904, 1906, 1907). They have won 16 conference titles in the RMAC (1912, 1914, 1918, 1939, 1942, 1951, 1958, 2004, 2010, 2014, 2016, 2018, 2019, 2021, 2022, and 2023). They have made the NCAA Tournament five times in this century. As of October 21 of the 2023 season, the Orediggers have an all-time record of 515–557–30.

== Playoff appearances ==
=== NCAA Division II ===
Colorado Mines has made nine appearances in the NCAA Division II football playoffs, with a combined record of 12–9.

Year	Round	Opponent	Result
2004	First Round; Second Round	Midwestern State; Pittsburg State	W, 52–33; L, 35–70
2010	First Round	Grand Valley State	L, 13–35
2014	First Round	Ohio Dominican	L, 23–34
2016	First Round; Second Round	Southwest Baptist; Ferris State	W, 63–35; L, 17–38
2018	First Round	CSU Pueblo	L, 17–37
2019	First Round; Second Round	Sioux Falls; Texas A&M–Commerce	W, 24–21; L, 3–23
2021	Second Round; Regional Finals; Semifinals	Bemidji State; Angelo State; Valdosta State	W, 55–6; W, 34–26; L, 31–34
2022	First Round; Second Round; Regional Finals; Semifinals; Championship	CSU Pueblo; Minnesota State; Angelo State; Shepherd; Ferris State	W, 45–24; W, 48–45; W, 42–24; W, 44–13; L, 14–41
2023	Second Round; Regional Finals; Semifinals; Championship	Augustana (SD); Central Washington; Kutztown; Harding	W, 56–10; W, 38–14; W, 35–7; L, 7–38

== All-time coaching records ==
Head coach	Period	Record	Win %	Conference championships
Unknown	1888–1895	33–6–2	.805	5
Louis Mein Whitehouse	1896	3–3	.500	0
Conrad F. Goss	1897	6–3	.667	1
Thomas Beadle	1898–1903	21–14–2	.595	1
Shorty Ellsworth	1904–1907	15–1–4	.850	3
Clarence W. Russell	1908	2–3	.400	0
Joe Curtis	1909	3–3	.500	0
Theodore M. Stuart	1910–1911	4–9	.308	0
William E. Johnston & Erle Kristler	1912	8–1	.889	1
Erle Kristler & Harry G. Buckingham	1913	5–1	.833	0
William J. Hanley	1914–1915	9–2	.818	1
Fred G. Carter	1916	3–3	.500	0
Charles "Poss" Parsons	1917	5–3	.625	0
Irving J. Barron	1918	4–0	1.000	1
Ralph Glaze	1919–1920	0–10–3	.115	0
Elmer Capshaw	1921	1–5	.167	0
Elmer Capshaw & Tim Callahan	1922	4–2–1	.643	0
Tim Callahan	1923	2–5	.286	0
Ray Courtright	1924–1926	7–17–1	.300	0
George H. Allen	1927–1930	7–20	.259	0
George H. Allen & Elmer Wynne	1931–1932	2–12–1	.167	0
Dutch Clark	1933	1–5	.167	0
George W. Scott	1934–1935	2–12	.143	0
A. F. White	1936	2–6	.250	0
John Mason	1937–1946	22–25–2	.469	2
Fritz S. Brennecke	1947–1968	78–113–8	.412	2
Marvin L. Kay	1969–1994	84–157–6	.340	0
Versie Wallace	1995–1999	11–41	.212	0
Bob Stitt	2000–2014	110–62	.640	3
Gregg Brandon	2015–2021	59–15	.797	4
Brandon Moore	2022	13–3	.813	1
Pete Sterbick	2023–2024	22–4	.846	1
Totals	1888–present	548–569–30	.491	25

Source: Colorado School of Mines Football Media Guide
