= List of UCLA Bruins football seasons =

This is a list of UCLA Bruins football seasons since the college's inception in 1919.

== Seasons ==
Year	Coach	Overall	Conference	Standing	Bowl/playoffs	Coaches^{#}	AP^{°}
Fred Cozens (Independent) (1919)
1919	Fred Cozens	2–6					
Harry Trotter (Southern California Intercollegiate Athletic Conference) (1920–1922)
1920	Harry Trotter	0–5	0–5	6th			
1921	Harry Trotter	0–5	0–5	6th			
1922	Harry Trotter	2–3–1	1–3–1	T–4th			
James J. Cline (Southern California Intercollegiate Athletic Conference) (1923–1924)
1923	James J. Cline	2–5	0–5	6th			
1924	James J. Cline	0–5–3	0–4–1	6th			
William H. Spaulding (Southern California Intercollegiate Athletic Conference) (1925–1927)
1925	William H. Spaulding	5–3–1	3–1–1	2nd			
1926	William H. Spaulding	5–3	4–2	2nd			
1927	William H. Spaulding	6–2–1	4–0–1	2nd			
William H. Spaulding (Pacific Coast Conference) (1928–1938)
1928	William H. Spaulding	4–4–1	0–4	T–9th			
1929	William H. Spaulding	4–4	1–3	6th			
1930	William H. Spaulding	3–5	1–4	T–8th			
1931	William H. Spaulding	3–4–1	0–3	T–9th			
1932	William H. Spaulding	6–4	4–2	3rd			
1933	William H. Spaulding	6–4–1	1–3–1	8th			
1934	William H. Spaulding	7–3	2–3	6th			
1935	William H. Spaulding	8–2	4–1	T–1st			
1936	William H. Spaulding	6–3–1	4–3–1	4th			
1937	William H. Spaulding	2–6–1	1–5–1	9th			
1938	William H. Spaulding	7–4–1	4–3–1	T–3rd	W Pineapple		
Edwin Horrell (Pacific Coast Conference) (1939–1944)
1939	Edwin Horrell	6–0–4	5–0–3	T–1st			7
1940	Edwin Horrell	1–9	1–6	9th			
1941	Edwin Horrell	5–5–1	3–4–1	6th			
1942	Edwin Horrell	7–4	6–1	1st	L Rose		13
1943	Edwin Horrell	1–8	0–4	4th			
1944	Edwin Horrell	4–5–1	1–2–1	3rd			
Bert LaBrucherie (Pacific Coast Conference) (1945–1948)
1945	Bert LaBrucherie	5–4	2–3	5th			
1946	Bert LaBrucherie	10–1	7–0	1st	L Rose		4
1947	Bert LaBrucherie	5–4	4–2	4th			
1948	Bert LaBrucherie	3–7	2–6	8th			
Henry R. Sanders (Pacific Coast Conference) (1949–1957)
1949	Henry R. Sanders	6–3	5–2	2nd			
1950	Henry R. Sanders	6–3	5–2	3rd			
1951	Henry R. Sanders	5–3–1	4–1–1	2nd		17	17
1952	Henry R. Sanders	8–1	5–1	2nd		6	6
1953	Henry R. Sanders	8–2	6–1	1st	L Rose	4	5
1954	Henry R. Sanders	9–0	6–0	1st	(Note: National Champion UCLA was ineligible for the Rose Bowl due to a "no-repeat" rule, with USC (a team UCLA had beaten 34–0) sent instead and losing.)	1	2
1955	Henry R. Sanders	9–2	6–0	1st	L Rose	4	4
1956	Henry R. Sanders	7–3	5–2	T–2nd			
1957	Henry R. Sanders	8–2	5–2	3rd		18	
William F. Barnes (Pacific Coast Conference / AAWU) (1958–1964)
1958	William F. Barnes	3–6–1	2–4–1	6th			
1959	William F. Barnes	5–4–1	3–1	T–1st			
1960	William F. Barnes	7–2–1	2–2	3rd			
1961	William F. Barnes	7–4	3–1	1st	L Rose		
1962	William F. Barnes	4–6	1–3	5th			
1963	William F. Barnes	2–8	2–2	3rd			
1964	William F. Barnes	4–6	2–2	4th			
Tommy Prothro (AAWU / Pacific-8 Conference) (1965–1970)
1965	Tommy Prothro	8–2–1	4–0	1st	W Rose	5	4
1966	Tommy Prothro	9–1	3–1	T–2nd	(Note: 9–1, #5 ranked UCLA was voted out of the Rose Bowl by the AAWU conference in favor of 7–4 USC due to it having one more 'conference game win", 4–1 to UCLA's 3–1. UCLA beat USC earlier that year.)	5	5
1967	Tommy Prothro	7–2–1	4–1–1	T–2nd		10	
1968	Tommy Prothro	3–7	2–4	T–5th			
1969	Tommy Prothro	8–1–1	5–1–1	T–2nd		10	13
1970	Tommy Prothro	6–5	4–3	T–2nd			
Pepper Rodgers (Pacific-8 Conference) (1971–1973)
1971	Pepper Rodgers	2–7–1	1–4–1	8th			
1972	Pepper Rodgers	8–3	5–2	2nd			
1973	Pepper Rodgers	9–2	6–1	2nd		9	12
Dick Vermeil (Pacific-8 Conference) (1974–1975)
1974	Dick Vermeil	6–3–2	4–2–1	T–3rd			
1975	Dick Vermeil	9–2–1	7–1	T–1st	W Rose	5	5
Terry Donahue (Pacific-10 Conference) (1976–1995)
1976	Terry Donahue	9–2–1	6–1	2nd	L Liberty	15	15
1977	Terry Donahue	7–4 (Note: UCLA finished the 1977 season 7–4 overall and 5–2 in conference, tied for 2nd in the conference. They later forfeited the 7 wins due to having an ineligible player.)	5–2	2nd			
1978	Terry Donahue	8–3–1	6–2	2nd	T Fiesta	14	12
1979	Terry Donahue	5–6	3–4	7th			
1980	Terry Donahue	9–2	5–2	2nd	Ineligible (Note: UCLA was ineligible for post season play after the 1980 season due to probation.)	13	14
1981	Terry Donahue	7–4–1	4–2–1	T–4th	L Bluebonnet		
1982	Terry Donahue	10–1–1	5–1–1	1st	W Rose	5	5
1983	Terry Donahue	7–4–1	6–1–1	1st	W Rose	17	13
1984	Terry Donahue	9–3	5–2	T–3rd	W Fiesta	9	10
1985	Terry Donahue	9–2–1	6–2	1st	W Rose	7	6
1986	Terry Donahue	8–3–1	5–2–1	T–2nd	W Freedom	14	14
1987	Terry Donahue	10–2	7–1	T–1st	W Aloha	9	11
1988	Terry Donahue	10–2	6–2	2nd	W Cotton	6	6
1989	Terry Donahue	3–7–1	2–5–1	9th			
1990	Terry Donahue	5–6	4–4	T–6th			
1991	Terry Donahue	9–3	6–2	T–2nd	W Sun	19	18
1992	Terry Donahue	6–5	3–5	8th			
1993	Terry Donahue	8–4	6–1	T–1st	L Rose	18	17
1994	Terry Donahue	5–6	3–5	T–5th			
1995	Terry Donahue	7–5	4–4	T–5th	L Aloha		
Bob Toledo (Pacific-10 Conference) (1996–2002)
1996	Bob Toledo	5–6	4–4	4th			
1997	Bob Toledo	10–2	7–1	1st	W Cotton	5	5
1998	Bob Toledo	10–2	8–0	1st	L Rose^{†}	8	8
1999	Bob Toledo	4–7	2–6	9th			
2000	Bob Toledo	6–6	3–5	T–5th	L Sun		
2001	Bob Toledo	7–4	4–4	6th			
2002	Bob Toledo (Note: Coach Toledo was fired before the bowl game, so offensive line coach Ed Kezirian coached the 2002 Las Vegas Bowl.)	8–5	4–4	T–4th	W Las Vegas		
Karl Dorrell (Pacific-10 Conference) (2003–2007)
2003	Karl Dorrell	6–7	4–4	T–5th	L Silicon Valley		
2004	Karl Dorrell	6–6	4–4	T–5th	L Las Vegas		
2005	Karl Dorrell	10–2	6–2	3rd	W Sun	13	16
2006	Karl Dorrell	7–6	5–4	4th	L Emerald		
2007	Karl Dorrell (Note: Coach Dorrell was fired before the bowl game, so defensive coordinator DeWayne Walker coached the 2007 Las Vegas Bowl.)	6–7	5–4	T–4th	L Las Vegas		
Rick Neuheisel (Pacific-10 / Pacific-12 Conference) (2008–2011)
2008	Rick Neuheisel	4–8	3–6	8th			
2009	Rick Neuheisel	7–6	3–6	8th	W EagleBank		
2010	Rick Neuheisel	4–8	2–7	9th			
2011	Rick Neuheisel (Note: Coach Neuheisel was fired before the bowl game, so offensive coordinator Mike Johnson coached the 2011 Kraft Fight Hunger Bowl.)	6–8	5–4	2nd (South) (Note: USC had a better conference record, but was ineligible for postseason play due to probation, so UCLA, the 2nd place finisher, was the Pac-12's first South Division Champion.)	L Kraft Fight Hunger		
Jim L. Mora (Pac-12 Conference) (2012–2017)
2012	Jim L. Mora	9–5	6–3	1st (South)	L Holiday		
2013	Jim L. Mora	10–3	6–3	T–2nd (South)	W Sun	16	16
2014	Jim L. Mora	10–3	6–3	T–2nd (South)	W Alamo	10	10
2015	Jim L. Mora	8–5	5–4	3rd (South)	L Foster Farms		
2016	Jim L. Mora	4–8	2–7	5th (South)			
2017	Jim L. Mora (Note: Coach Mora was fired after the USC game, so offensive coordinator Jedd Fisch was head coach against Cal and in the 2017 Cactus Bowl.)	6–7	4–5	4th (South)	L Cactus		
Chip Kelly (Pac-12 Conference) (2018–2023)
2018	Chip Kelly	3–9	3–6	5th (South)			
2019	Chip Kelly	4–8	4–5	T–3rd (South)			
2020	Chip Kelly	3–4	3–4	5th (South)			
2021	Chip Kelly	8–4	6–3	T–2nd (South)	CX Holiday (Note: UCLA accepted a bid to the Holiday Bowl, where they were due to face North Carolina State. However, just hours before game time, the Bruins withdrew from the bowl due to COVID-19 protocols in their program, and the bowl was canceled.)		
2022	Chip Kelly	9–4	6–3	5th	L Sun	21	21
2023	Chip Kelly	8–5	4–5	8th	W LA		
DeShaun Foster (Big Ten Conference) (2024–2025)
2024	DeShaun Foster	5–7	3–6	12th			
2025	DeShaun Foster	3–9 (Note: Foster was fired after starting 0–3, and Tim Skipper was named interim head coach for the remainder of the season.)	3–6	T–12th			
Total:		629–438–37					
National championship Conference title Conference division title or championship game berth
^{†}Indicates Bowl Coalition, Bowl Alliance, BCS, or CFP / New Years' Six bowl.; ^{#}Rankings from final Coaches Poll.; ^{°}Rankings from final AP Poll.

== See also ==
- List of Pac-12 Conference football standings
