= Dennis Dummit =

American football quarterback

Profile
- Position: Quarterback

Personal information
- Born: June 7, 1949 (age 77); Los Angeles County, California, U.S.
- Listed height: 6 ft 0 in (1.83 m)
- Listed weight: 180 lb (82 kg)

Career information
- High school: Woodrow Wilson (Long Beach, California)
- College: Long Beach City College (1967–1968): UCLA (1969–1970)

Career history
- Las Vegas Cowboys (1969); The Hawaiians (1974)

Dennis Dummit (born June 7 1949) was an American football quarterback. He played college football for Long Beach City College in 1967 to 1968 and for UCLA in 1969 and 1970. In 1968, Dummit completed 147 of 246 passes for 2,131 yards and 19 touchdowns and was selected as the first-team quarterback on the J.C. Grid-Wire Junior College All-America team. In two seasons as UCLA's starting quarterback, he led the team to a 14–6–1 record and tallied 4,356 passing yards and 29 touchdowns. His passing efficiency rating of 148.3 in 1969 was the second highest among major-college players; he also ranked third in the country with an average of 17.2 yards per reception in 1969. Again in 1970, Dummit ranked among the leading quarterbacks in major-college football with 2,392 passing yards (7th) and 9.4 yards per reception (2nd).

Overlooked in the 1971 NFL draft, Dummit signed as a free agent with the Los Angeles Rams but was released before the regular season. He also played professional football for the Ottawa Rough Riders of the Canadian Football League in 1972 and for The Hawaiians of the World Football League in 1974.
