= 1922 Southern Branch Cubs football team =

American college football season

1922 Southern Branch Cubs football
- Conference: Southern California Conference
- Record: 2–3–1 (1–3–1 SCC)
- Head coach: Harry Trotter (3rd season)
- Home stadium: Moore Field

1922 Southern California Conference football standings
	Conf.					Overall
Team	W		L		T	W		L		T
Pomona $	5	–	0	–	0	5	–	3	–	0
Occidental	4	–	1	–	0	5	–	3	–	0
Caltech	3	–	2	–	0	3	–	3	–	0
Whittier	1	–	3	–	1	3	–	3	–	1
Southern Branch	1	–	3	–	1	2	–	3	–	1
Redlands	0	–	5	–	0	2	–	5	–	0
$ – Conference champion

The 1922 Southern Branch Cubs football team represented the Southern Branch of the University of California (later known as UCLA) in the 1922 college football season. The program, which was later known as the Bruins, was in its fourth year of existence. The Cubs were coached by Harry Trotter and finished the season with a 2–3–1 record.

== Schedule ==
Date	Opponent	Site	Result
October 7	at San Diego State*	Balboa Stadium; San Diego, CA	W 24–6
October 14	at Redlands	Redlands Stadium; Redlands, CA	W 34–9
October 21	Occidental	Moore Field; Los Angeles, CA	L 7–14
November 4	at Whittier	Hadley Field; Whittier, CA	T 6–6
November 18	at Pomona	Alumni Field; Claremont, CA	L 6–20
November 25	Caltech	Moore Field; Los Angeles, CA	L 6–7
*Non-conference game
