= 1947 Rose Bowl =

American college football game

- 33rd Rose Bowl Game
Illinois Fighting Illini	UCLA Bruins
(7–2)	(10–0)
Big Nine	PCC
45	14
Head coach: Ray Eliot	Head coach: Bert LaBrucherie
AP 5	AP 4
	1	2	3	4	Total
Illinois	6	19	0	20	45
UCLA	7	7	0	0	14
- Date: January 1, 1947
- Season: 1946
- Stadium: Rose Bowl
- Location: Pasadena, California
- MVP: Claude "Buddy" Young and Julius Rykovich (Illinois halfbacks)
- Favorite: UCLA by 14, reduced to 6 by game time
- National anthem: UCLA Band
- Referee: James J. Tunney (Pacific Coast; split crew: Pacific Coast, Big Nine)
- Halftime show: UCLA Band
- Attendance: 93,000 (estimated-sellout)

The 1947 Rose Bowl was a college football bowl game, the 33rd edition of the Rose Bowl Game. The Illinois Fighting Illini defeated the UCLA Bruins, 45–14. Illinois halfbacks Buddy Young and Jules Rykovich shared the Player of the Game award, named when the award was created in 1953 and selections were made retroactively.

This was the first Rose Bowl game that featured teams from the Pacific Coast Conference (PCC) and the Big Nine Conference (now the Big Ten). It is known as the first "modern" Rose Bowl, and modern Rose Bowl records date to this game. The conference tie-ins were defined by the terms of an exclusive five-year agreement. The agreement was renegotiated with the newly formed Athletic Association of Western Universities (AAWU; later known as the Pacific-8, Pacific-10, and Pac-12) following the disbandment of the PCC in mid-1959. The agreement remained in place until the 1999 Rose Bowl, when the Rose Bowl became part of the Bowl Championship Series.

== Big Nine-PCC agreement ==
At the beginning, the Rose Bowl game was intended to match a West Coast team against the best of the nation. The first team to appear was Michigan in the 1902 Rose Bowl when they defeated Stanford 49-0. The Rose Bowl began to be hosted by the Pacific Coast Conference when it was revived in the 1916 Rose Bowl, and permanently with the 1920 Rose Bowl. Ohio State was the next Big Ten team to participate what they lost to California 0-28 in the 1921 Rose Bowl. The Big Ten did not participate in bowl games following that game. The University of Chicago discontinued its football program in 1939 and withdrew from the conference in 1946, leaving the Big Nine Conference.

During World War II, many college football schools had dropped some conference opponents and instead played football against local military base teams. Many colleges could not even field teams due to the draft and manpower requirements. After the war was over, demobilization and the G.I. Bill enabled returning servicemen to attend college. The 1946 season was the first true post-war college football season with travel restrictions lifted and civilian college opponents returning to schedules.

The Big Nine agreed, after much negotiating over payments, rules, and ticket allocations to a five-year exclusive deal with the Rose Bowl to send the conference champion to meet the PCC conference champion. UCLA, USC, Minnesota and Illinois all voted against it. UCLA, the PCC conference champion, expressed interest in playing either Army or Notre Dame, who had played to a scoreless tie in the 1946 Army vs. Notre Dame football game.

The Big Nine and PCC were of the same accord when it came to treating players as amateurs, as compared to the semi-professional status that the Southern Universities proposed. Also, the Big Nine and PCC both had the same attitudes towards desegregation and allowing African-Americans to play football. Many other universities were still segregated. None of the Southeastern Conference schools had an African American athlete until 1966. The Cotton Bowl, Orange Bowl, and Sugar Bowl would not be integrated until 1948, 1955, and 1956 respectively.

== Teams ==
=== UCLA Bruins ===
The UCLA Bruins had last appeared in the 1943 Rose Bowl where they were held scoreless against Georgia. The Bruins fielded the strongest team in their history to date. It was the second undefeated team since the 1939 6–0–4 team, and the first undefeated and untied team in school history. After convincing wins over Oregon State and at Washington, UCLA entered the AP Poll at number 5. The Bruins would go to number four after defeating number 17 Stanford, 26–6. Coming into the November 23, 1946 UCLA–USC rivalry football game, the Rose Bowl was on the line for both USC and UCLA. UCLA prevailed, 13–6, to win the PCC. In the Bruins' final game of the regular season, they blanked the Nebraska Cornhuskers, 18–0.

The 10-0 UCLA Bruins entered the Rose Bowl as the bookmakers' favorite, having outscored their opponents 313-72. All-conference quarterback Ernie Case called the plays for a offense featuring pass-catching ends Burr Baldwin and future hall-of-famer Tom Fears, and bolstered by the breakout running of fullbacks Cal Rossi and Johnny Roesh and halfback Gene Rowland. Rossi weighed in as the Bruins' heaviest back at just 170 lb, but the team averaged a shade over 200 lb per man. Several linemen in the 230 lb range (as big as they came in the days of one-platoon football) made for UCLA front which stampeded west coast rivals. Averaging just 190 lb the Illini were noticeably smaller.

=== Illinois Fighting Illini ===
This was the first appearance for the Fighting Illini in any post-season football game. The Illini opened the season winning at Pittsburgh, 33–7. They lost to Notre Dame in the first game for the 1946 Fighting Irish, a team that would eventually play in the 1946 Game of the Century against Army. The Illini beat Purdue, but then lost to Indiana. The Illini would go on to win the rest of their games including 13–9 at Michigan and a 16–7 win over Ohio State. In the final regular season game, they blanked in-state rival Northwestern 20–0. The win over Michigan proved to be the pivotal game as Michigan finished 5–1–1 in conference to Illinois 6–1 record.

Claude "Buddy" Young was the University of Illinois’ first black football star. The 5’4" speedster made an immediate impact as a freshman in 1944, scoring sixty-four and thirty yard touchdowns on his first two touches vs. Illinois State. A 93-yard run two games later against the Great Lakes Naval Training School remains the longest run from scrimmage in Illini history. Young finished the season with thirteen touchdowns, breaking Red Grange's 1924 Big Ten Conference record and landing the freshman on several all-America lists. More impressively, Young claimed NCAA track championships in the 100 and 220-yard dash, and tied world records in the 45 and 60-yard dash. After being drafted into the navy in January 1945 he starred the following fall for the Fleet City California Naval Base football team, almost single-handedly winning the west coast service team championship with three touchdowns, including two kick returns of 93 and 88 yards in front of 65,000 fans at the L.A. Coliseum. In 1946 Young returned to Champaign and led the Illini with 456 rushing yards a little over four yards per carry despite persistent injury problems.

Young shared the backfield with fellow halfback Art Dufelmeier, known fondly as the "Flying Dutchman". The Havana, Ill. native enrolled in Champaign in 1942 and lettered in both football and basketball as a freshman. He enlisted with the U.S. Air Force in 1943 and entered one of the most dangerous service jobs as a B-42 top-gunner. In early 1944 Dufelmeier's plane was shot down over France. He spent eleven months as a POW inside Germany, losing 35 lb before liberation. Simply glad to be alive, Dufelmeier relished his return to football in 1946.

Despite Young and Dufelmeier rushing for over 900 combined yards, Illinois’ only all-conference and all-America selection was right guard Alex Agase. Another tough veteran, Agase had served as a marine in the Pacific. He participated in the amphibious invasions of both Okinawa and Iwo Jima, earning a Purple Heart. Alex's brother Lou played at left tackle. Alex Agase had scored twice as a sophomore against Minnesota in 1942, making him only the second guard to notch a multiple touchdown performance in collegiate history. The following year, he made all-America lists playing for Purdue while training as a Marine in Indiana. Later Agase would coach Northwestern and Purdue. His obvious football intelligence contributed inestimably to the top-notch run-blocking of Illinois' line.

== Game summary ==
The UCLA Bruins scored their first ever post-season points when Ernie Case scored on a quarterback sneak to give the Bruins a 7–6 first-quarter lead. However, it was the fourth-ranked Illini who took control after that, outscoring UCLA 39–7. Illinois dominated the Bruins on the ground, compiling 320 yards to the Bruins 62.

Regardless of any apparent size mis-match, history repeated itself as Illinois out-witted and out-played the bigger Bruins in the same convincing style in which Alabama had blow past the larger Trojans a year earlier. The Agase brothers and Illini captain center Mack Wenskunas opened gaping holes all day, often simply cutting the Bruins down at the knees for Young, Dufelmeier, and Co. to skip over and around. UCLA coach Bert Labrucherie used virtually every player on his three-deep trying to counter Illinois’ unstoppable blocking. But to no avail. The New York Times post-game report claimed that the affair "looked like a college line blocking against high school forwards."

The Illini marched sixty yards on their first possession for a score. The rout began with quarterback Perry Moss tossing a 44-yard completion to halfback Julius Rykovich. After a kickoff return set UCLA up at midfield Case responded in kind with a 40-yard strike to his diminutive but elusive halfback Al Hoisch. When the Bruins scored to take an early 7-6 lead the 90,000-strong crowd sensed an epic in the making. Instead they witnessed Illinois shifting gears and leaving UCLA behind.

Illinois put together scoring drives of sixty and fifty-five yards on its first two possessions of the second quarter. A lineup of mostly second-string players added a fourth Illini score shortly before the break. Hoisch responded with a scintillating 103-kickoff return [still a Rose Bowl record] to keep the score respectable at the interval. But solo efforts, no matter how impressive, could not make up the difference. Young finished another long drive, this time fifty-one yards, with a short scoring run on the first play of the fourth quarter. Russell Steger then ran back a Case interception for a 65-yard defensive touchdown to make the score 38-14. Stanley Green, a fourth-string Illinois back, added insult to injury with a second six-point interception return in the game's final minutes.

The Illini prevailed in an outright romp, 45-14. Eliot's squad held the Bruins to just twelve first downs and forced six demoralizing turnovers. Most incredibly, the Illini held a team that had run roughshod over the west coast to a paltry sixty-two rushing yards. Only 176 passing yards on 29 attempts from Case afforded any offensive success. Despite their lesser physical stature Illinois racked up 320 team rushing yards, including 100-yard performances from both Young and Dufelmeier. The 1946 season marked the first visit to Pasadena from the Big Ten champion since Ohio State fell 28-0 to Cal in 1921. The Big Ten would provide the visitor at the New Year's Day classic for each of the next fifty-one seasons.

A number of records were set in the game. Illinois set two new Rose bowl records: Most first downs at 28 (the previous first down record was 22, set against UCLA by Georgia in the 1943 Rose Bowl), and Most yards gained by rushing at 320 (the previous record for yards rushing was Oregon's 298 against Harvard in the 1920 Rose Bowl. Six different Illinois players scored touchdowns. These were broken in later years.

UCLA's Al Hoisch returned Illinois kicker Don Maechtle's kickoff 103 yards, establishing a Rose Bowl and UCLA team record which still stands as of the 2008 Rose Bowl. Hoisch also still holds the modern Rose Bowl record for Highest average Gain Per Return at 44.5 yards. The eight kickoff returns made by the Bruins also are a Rose Bowl record.

Illinois' Russell Steger set modern Rose Bowl records for both most yards on interception returns and the longest interception return for a touchdown with a 68-yard return that scored in the fourth quarter. Elmer Layden holds the records, set in the 1925 Rose Bowl.

== Scoring ==
=== First quarter ===
- Illinois – Julius Rykovich, one-yard run. Kick failed.
- UCLA – Ernie Case, one-yard quarterback sneak. Case kick.

=== Second quarter ===
- Illinois – Buddy Young, two-yard run. Maechtle kick.
- Illinois – Paul Patterson four-yard run. Kick failed.
- Illinois – Perry Moss one-yard sneak. Kick blocked.
- UCLA – Al Hoisch returns Maechtle's kickoff 103 yards. Case kick.

=== Third quarter ===
- no scoring

=== Fourth quarter ===
- Illinois – Young, one-yard run. Maechtle kick.
- Illinois – Russ Steger, 68-yard interception return. Kick failed.
- Illinois – Stan Green, 20-yard interception return. Maechtle kick.

=== Statistics ===
Team stats	Illinois	UCLA
First downs	23	12
Net yards rushing	320	62
Net yards passing	78	176
Total yards	398	238
PC–PA–Int.	4–15–2	13–29–4
Punts–Avg.	5–35.4	8–33.1
Fumbles–Lost	1–0	2–2
Penalties–Yards	6–75	5–45

== Aftermath ==
Six modern Rose Bowl records still stand as of the 2008 Rose Bowl. Buddy Young and Julius Rykovich were named co-Most valuable players when the Rose Bowl introduced the award in 1953 and then retroactively applied the award to previous games. They were inducted into the Rose Bowl Hall Of Fame in 1993. Al Hoisch was inducted in 1999.

The Big Ten dominated early in the Rose Bowl Series, winning 12 of the first 13. The tide would begin turn to the West coast teams with the 1960 Rose Bowl.

UCLA and Illinois would have a re-match in the 1984 Rose Bowl with UCLA winning 45–9 in a reverse of the 1947 game, where Illinois was favored and wanted a better opponent.

The exclusive agreement remained in place until the 1999 Rose Bowl when the Rose Bowl became part of the Bowl Championship Series. The Pacific-10 Conference inherited the PCC representative position for the game. Even after 1998, the Rose Bowl would still attempt to pair a Big Ten and Pac-10 team. The 2008 Rose Bowl would feature USC vs. Illinois.

== Bibliography ==
- UCLA Football media guide (PDF copy available at www.uclabruins.com)
- University of Illinois Football media information (available at www.fightingillini.com)
- Big Ten Conference Football Media guide (PDF copy available at bigten.cstv.com Archived 2009-04-22 at the Wayback Machine)
- College Football Historical Society Volume XIII Issue IV August 2000, Article:Ray Eliot's First 10, pages 21–24.
- Little Champ. Time Magazine December 2, 1946. quote:The New Year's Day Rose Bowl rivals were chosen last week-and nobody was very happy about the choice. The Big Nine, who for 25 years have kept their fingers out of all Bowls, signed a contract with the Pacific Coast Conference which promised that, for the next three years, the westerners must play the Big Nine champ, and nobody else. Unbeaten U.C.L.A. beat its deadliest rival and Los Angeles neighbor, U.S.C., last week (13-6), and will represent the West. Twice-beaten Illinois defeated Northwestern 20-0, and will presumably represent the East. That left Army's far superior team-which wanted to play in the Rose Bowl-out in the cold, cold air. Said U.C.L.A.'s All-America prospect, End Burr Baldwin: "We would have been glad to hitchhike to West Point to play the cadets."
- Kacich, Tom (2002). "The Unwanted Illini". Hot Type – 150 Years of the Best Local Stories from the News-Gazette. Sports Publishing LLC. p. 168. ISBN 1-58261-482-2.
