= Harry Trotter =

American football coach (1890–1954)

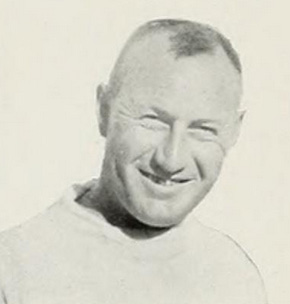
- Trotter pictured in Southern Campus 1923, UCLA yearbook

Biographical details
- Born: October 18, 1890; Kansas, U.S.
- Died: December 28, 1954 (aged 64); Beverly Hills, California, U.S.

Playing career

Track and field
- c. 1910: USC
- Position: Shot putter

Coaching career (HC unless noted)

Football
- 1916–1917: Manual Arts HS (CA)
- 1918–1919: Pasadena HS (CA)
- 1920–1922: Southern Branch
- 1943–1944: Willamette

Basketball
- 1943–?: Willamette

Track and field
- 1920–1946: Southern Branch / UCLA

Head coaching record
- Overall: 7–16–1 (college football)

Harry Elbert "Cap" Trotter (October 18, 1890 – December 28, 1954) was an American football, basketball, and track and field coach. He served as the head football the Southern Branch of the University of California—now known as the University of California, Los Angeles (UCLA)—from 1920 to 1922 and at Willamette University from 1943 to 1944, compiling a career college football record of 7–16–1. He was inducted into the Ventura County Sports Hall of Fame in 1989.

== Coaching career ==
UCLA began to play in the Southern California Intercollegiate Athletic Conference (SCIAC) in 1920, and competed against Occidental College, California Institute of Technology, University of Redlands, Whittier College, and Pomona College. Coach Trotter's two wins were against Redlands and San Diego State University, which did not join the SCIAC until 1926.

== Head coaching record ==
=== College football ===
Year	Team	Overall	Conference	Standing	Bowl/playoffs
Southern Branch Cubs (Southern California Intercollegiate Athletic Conference) (1920–1922)
1920	Southern Branch	0–5	0–5	6th	
1921	Southern Branch	0–5	0–5	6th	
1922	Southern Branch	2–3–1	1–3–1	T–4th	
Southern Branch:		2–13–1	1–13–1		
Willamette Bearcats (Northwest Conference) (1943–1944)
1943	Willamette	2–1	NA	NA	
1944	Willamette	3–2	NA	NA	
Willamette:		5–3			
Total:		7–16–1			
