= 1921 Southern Branch Cubs football team =

American college football season

1921 Southern Branch Cubs football
- Conference: Southern California Conference
- Record: 0–5 (0–5 SCC)
- Head coach: Harry Trotter (2nd season)
- Home stadium: Moore Field

1921 Southern California Conference football standings
	Conf.					Overall
Team	W		L		T	W		L		T
Whittier $	5	–	0	–	0	5	–	2	–	0
Redlands	4	–	1	–	0	5	–	2	–	1
Occidental	2	–	2	–	1	2	–	4	–	1
Pomona	2	–	2	–	1	2	–	3	–	1
Caltech	1	–	4	–	0	2	–	5	–	1
Southern Branch	0	–	5	–	0	0	–	5	–	0
$ – Conference champion

The 1921 Southern Branch Cubs football team represented the Southern Branch of the University of California in the 1921 college football season (later known as UCLA). The program, which was later known as the Bruins, was in its third year of existence. The Cubs were coached by Harry Trotter and finished the season with a 0–5 record.

== Schedule ==
Date	Opponent	Site	Result
October 8	Redlands	Moore Field; Los Angeles, CA	L 7–35
October 15	Pomona	Moore Field; Los Angeles, CA	L 7–55
October 29	at Occidental	Patterson Field; Los Angeles, CA	L 0–35
November 5	Whittier	Moore Field; Los Angeles, CA	L 0–62
November 11	at Caltech	Tournament Park; Pasadena, CA	L 0–27
