= Bert LaBrucherie =

American football player and coach (1905–1986)

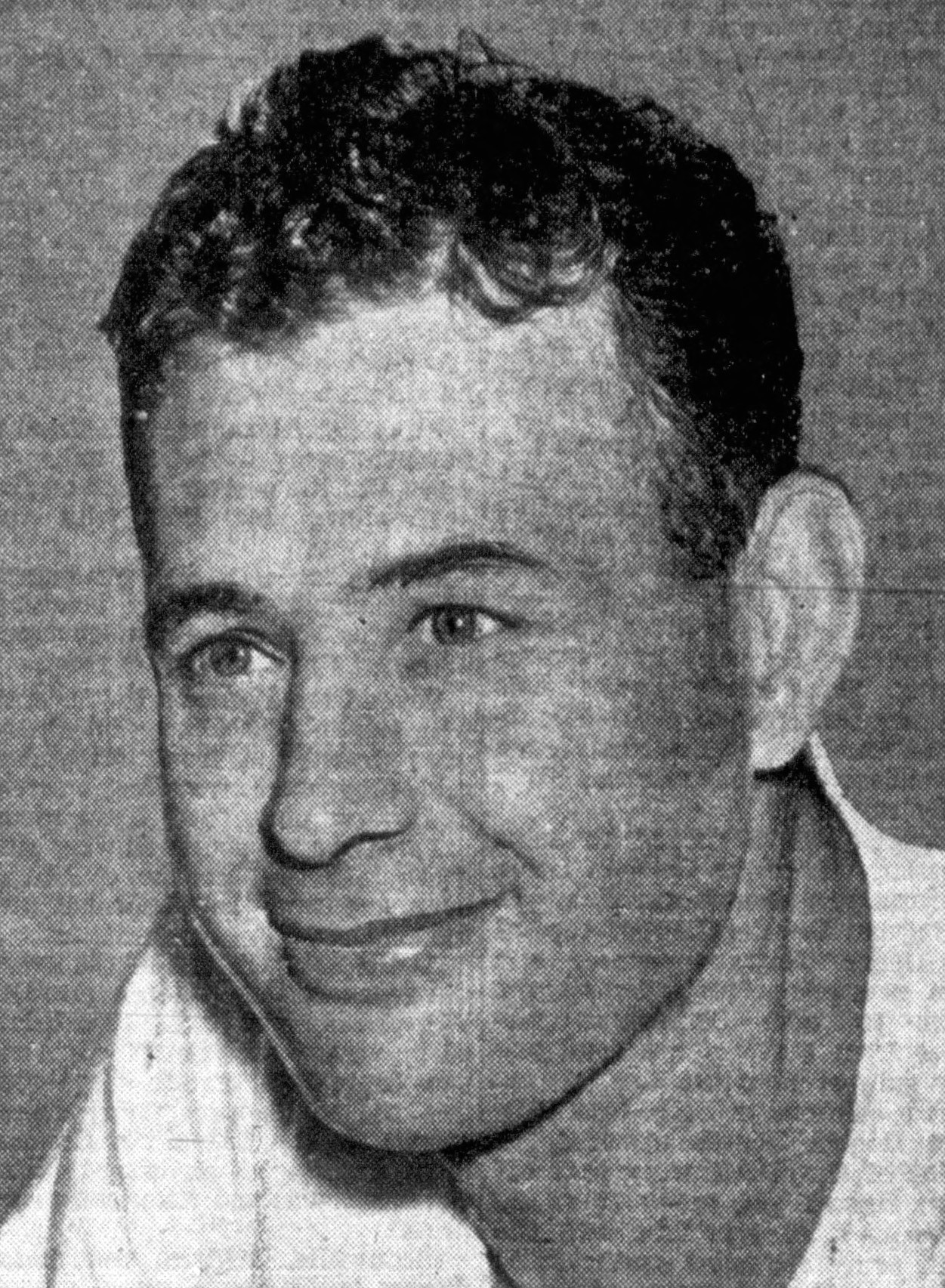
- LaBrucherie, circa 1942

Biographical details
- Born: January 19, 1905; Los Angeles, California, U.S.
- Died: December 10, 1986 (aged 81); Laguna Hills, California, U.S.

Playing career
- 1926–1928: UCLA
- Position: Halfback

Coaching career (HC unless noted)
- 1935–1944: Los Angeles HS (CA)
- 1945–1948: UCLA
- 1949–1967: Caltech

Head coaching record
- Overall: 42–136–2 (college football); 60–10–2 (high school football)
- Bowls: 0–1

Bert F. LaBrucherie (January 19, 1905 – December 10, 1986) was an American football player and coach. He served as the head football coach at the University of California, Los Angeles (UCLA) from 1945 to 1948 and at the California Institute of Technology (Caltech) from 1949 to 1967, compiling a career college football record of 42–136–2. LaBrucherie was inducted into the UCLA Athletics Hall of Fame in 1987.

== Playing career ==
LaBrucherie played varsity football for UCLA from 1926 to 1928.

== Football coaching career ==
After graduating from UCLA in 1929, LaBrucherie coached the football team at Los Angeles High School, his alma mater. As head coach from 1935 to 1944, he had a 60–10–2 record. His team won three "B" team league titles and seven "A" team championships. From 1945 to 1948, he was the head coach for the UCLA Bruins. He then served as the head coach at Caltech from 1949 to 1967. His 1946 UCLA Bruins team lost to Illinois in the 1947 Rose Bowl.

LaBrucherie's overall record at UCLA was 23–16. In his second year as head coach, the Bruins were Pacific Coast Conference champions, and lost to Illinois in the Rose Bowl. LaBrucherie coached the Caltech Beavers for 19 years in the Southern California Intercollegiate Athletic Conference. Though the Caltech coaching position was less demanding, Coach LaBrucherie once explained in an interview that sometimes the players would "line up with the wrong team." Caltech canceled its football program after the 1993 season, and its last football coach was Wendell Jack.

== Other sports ==
Also while at Caltech, LaBrucherie coached track and cross country. Under his leadership, the track team posted an overall record of 107–105. After resigning as the head football coach at Caltech, he coached cross country from 1968 until his retirement in 1973.

== Head coaching record ==
=== College football ===
| Year | Team | Overall | Conference | Standing | Bowl/playoffs | AP^{#} |
|---|---|---|---|---|---|---|
UCLA Bruins (Pacific Coast Conference) (1945–1948)
| 1945 | UCLA | 5–4 | 2–3 | 5th | | |
| 1946 | UCLA | 10–1 | 7–0 | 1st | L Rose | 4 |
| 1947 | UCLA | 5–4 | 4–2 | 4th | | |
| 1948 | UCLA | 3–7 | 2–6 | 8th | | |
| UCLA: | | 23–16 | 15–11 | | | |
Caltech Beavers (Southern California Conference / Southern California Intercollegiate Athletic Conference) (1949–1967)
| 1949 | Caltech | 0–6–1 | 0–4 | 5th | | |
| 1950 | Caltech | 1–6 | 0–4 | 5th | | |
| 1951 | Caltech | 2–5 | 1–3 | T–4th | | |
| 1952 | Caltech | 0–7 | 0–4 | 5th | | |
| 1953 | Caltech | 0–7 | 0–4 | 5th | | |
| 1954 | Caltech | 0–7 | 0–4 | 5th | | |
| 1955 | Caltech | 1–6 | 0–4 | 5th | | |
| 1956 | Caltech | 3–5 | 0–4 | 5th | | |
| 1957 | Caltech | 4–3 | 1–2 | 4th | | |
| 1958 | Caltech | 2–5–1 | 0–4 | 5th | | |
| 1959 | Caltech | 1–7 | 1–4 | 5th | | |
| 1960 | Caltech | 0–8 | 0–5 | 5th | | |
| 1961 | Caltech | 1–6 | NA | NA | | |
| 1962 | Caltech | 1–6 | 0–3 | 6th | | |
| 1963 | Caltech | 2–6 | NA | NA | | |
| 1964 | Caltech | 1–6 | 0–3 | 6th | | |
| 1965 | Caltech | 0–7 | 0–4 | 6th | | |
| 1966 | Caltech | 0–9 | 0–5 | 6th | | |
| 1967 | Caltech | 0–8 | 0–5 | 6th | | |
| Caltech: | | 19–120–2 | 3–66 | | | |
| Total: | | 42–136–2 | | | | |
National championship Conference title Conference division title or championship game berth
^{#}AP Poll.
