= 1920 Southern Branch Cubs football team =

American college football season

1920 Southern Branch Cubs football
- Conference: Southern California Conference
- Record: 0–5 (0–5 SCC)
- Head coach: Harry Trotter (1st season)
- Home stadium: Moore Field

1920 Southern California Conference football standings
	Conf.					Overall
Team	W		L		T	W		L		T
Pomona $	5	–	0	–	0	6	–	1	–	0
Occidental	3	–	2	–	0	4	–	3	–	0
Whittier	3	–	2	–	0	3	–	2	–	0
Caltech	2	–	2	–	1	3	–	3	–	1
Redlands	1	–	3	–	1	2	–	4	–	1
Southern Branch	0	–	5	–	0	0	–	5	–	0
$ – Conference champion

The 1920 Southern Branch Cubs football team represented the Southern Branch of the University of California (later known as UCLA) in the 1920 college football season. The program, which was later known as the Bruins, was in its second year of existence. The Cubs were coached by Harry Trotter and finished the season with a 0–5 record with a 103–0 loss to Whittier College.

== Schedule ==
Date	Time	Opponent	Site	Result
October 2	2:30 p.m.	at Pomona	Alumni Field; Clarement, CA	L 0–41
October 9	2:30 p.m.	Occidental	Moore Field; Los Angeles, CA	L 0–21
October 30	2:30 p.m.	at Redlands	Redlands Stadium; Redlands, CA	L 21–27
November 13		Caltech	Moore Field; Los Angeles, CA	L 0–32
November 20	2:30 p.m.	at Whittier	Hadley Field; Whittier, CA	L 0–103
All times are in Pacific time
