= UCLA Bruins football =

College football team representing the University of California, Los Angeles

2026 UCLA Bruins football team
- First season: 1919; 107 years ago
- Athletic director: Tim Harris
- Head coach: Bob Chesney; 1st season, 10–1 (.909)
- Location: Pasadena, California
- Stadium: Rose Bowl (capacity: 80,816)
- Field: Spieker Field
- NCAA division: Division I FBS
- Conference: Big Ten
- Colors: Blue and gold
- All-time record: 640–450–37 (.584)
- Bowl record: 17–20–1 (.461)

National championships
- Claimed: 1954

Conference championships
- PCC: 1935, 1942, 1946, 1953, 1954, 1955 Pac-12: 1959, 1961, 1965, 1975, 1982, 1983, 1985, 1987, 1993, 1997, 1998

Division championships
- Pac-12 South: 2011, 2012
- Heisman winners: Gary Beban – 1967
- Consensus All-Americans: 41
- Rivalries: USC (rivalry); California (rivalry); Stanford (rivalry)

Uniforms
- Fight song: Mighty Bruins; Sons of Westwood
- Mascot: Joe & Josephine Bruin
- Marching band: The Solid Gold Sound
- Outfitter: Jordan Brand
- Website: UCLABruins.com

The UCLA Bruins football program represents the University of California, Los Angeles, in college football as members of the Big Ten Conference at the NCAA Division I Football Bowl Subdivision (FBS) level. The Bruins play their home games off campus at the Rose Bowl in Pasadena, California.

The Bruins have enjoyed several periods of success in their history, having been ranked in the top ten of the AP Poll at least once in every decade since the poll began in the 1930s. Their first major period of success came in the 1950s, under head coach Red Sanders. Sanders led the Bruins to the Coaches' Poll national championship in 1954, three conference championships, and an overall record of 66–19–1 in nine years. In the 1980s and 1990s, during the tenure of Terry Donahue, the Bruins compiled a 151–74–8 record, including 13 bowl games and an NCAA record eight straight bowl wins. Recent success has evaded them, though, landing them with a 16–19 overall bowl game record. The program has produced 28 first-round picks in the NFL draft, 30 consensus All-Americans, and multiple major award winners, including Heisman Trophy winner Gary Beban. The UCLA Bruins' main rival is the USC Trojans.

The Bruins were twice the Pac-12 Conference South Division champions, earning the right to play in Pac-12 Football Championship Games in both 2011 and 2012. UCLA and fellow Pac-12 members USC, Oregon, and Washington left for the Big Ten Conference in 2024.

== History ==
=== Early history (1919–1924) ===
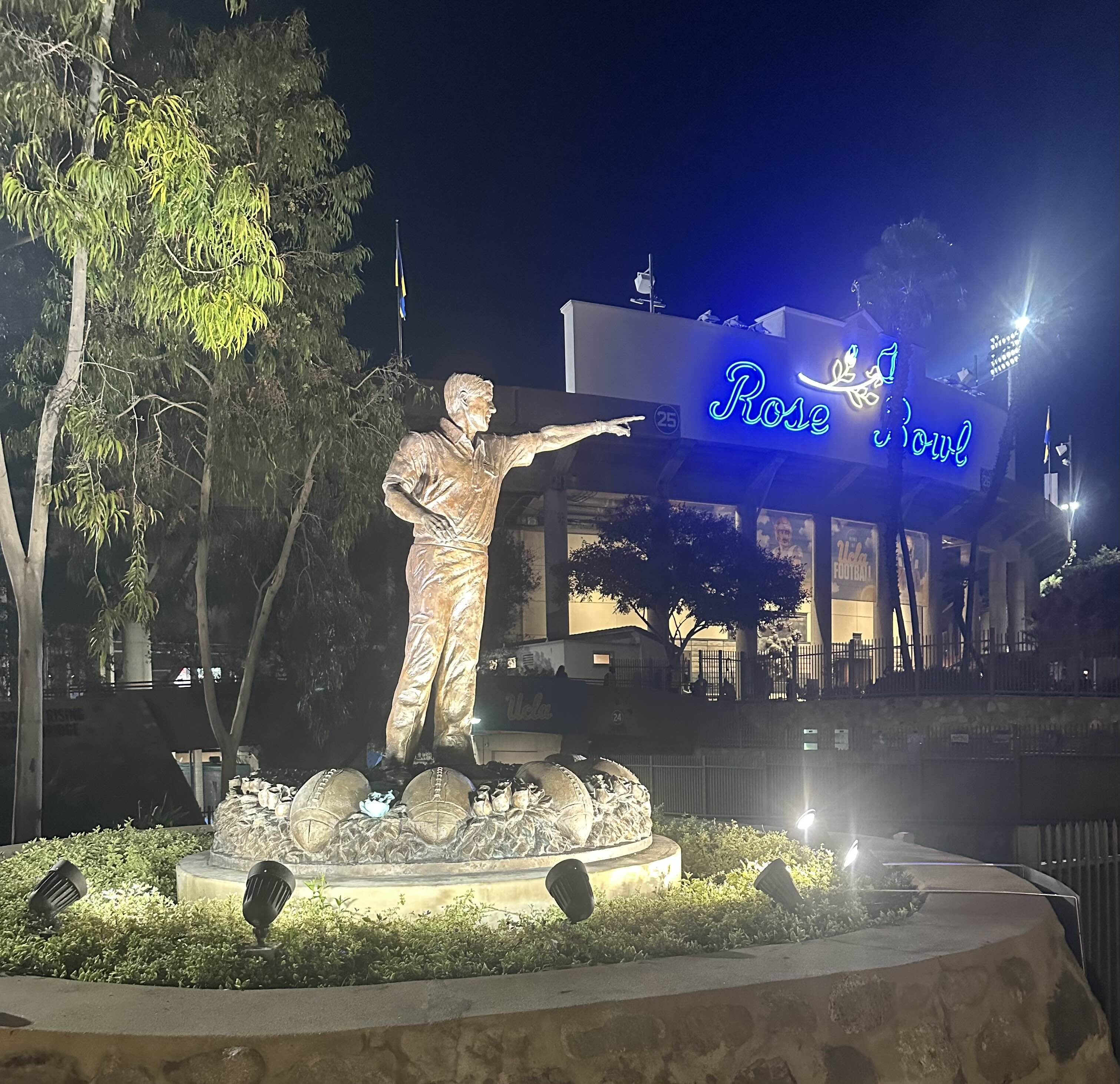
Terry Donahue statue at the Rose Bowl. Introduced in 2023 to honor the most successful coach of the program.

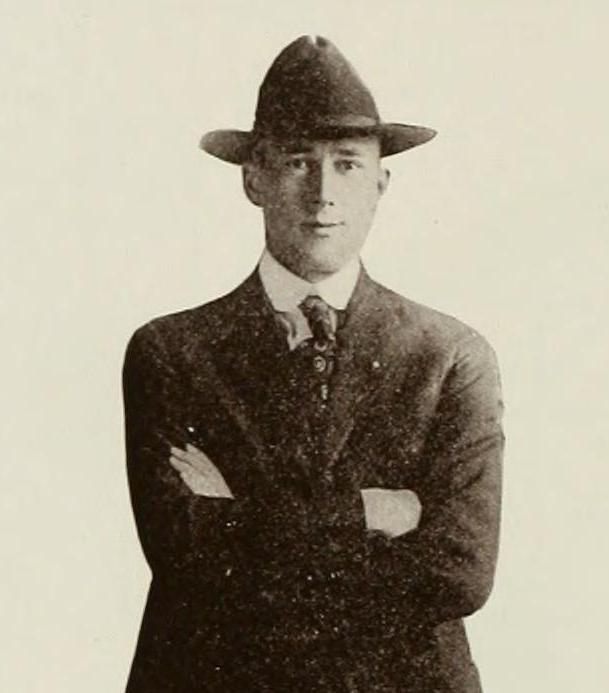
Fred Cozens, UCLA's first head football coach

The first football team fielded by UCLA took the field in 1919. The team was coached by Fred Cozens, and compiled a 2–6 record. UCLA did not participate in an athletic conference until 1920, so the 1919 football team played a schedule full of local high schools and other assorted teams. Cozens was UCLA's athletics director from 1919 to 1942. Harry Trotter took over the young UCLA football program after Cozens stepped down after guiding the Bruins in their first season. UCLA began to play in the Southern California Intercollegiate Athletic Conference (SCIAC) in 1920, and competed against Occidental College, California Institute of Technology, University of Redlands, Whittier College, and Pomona College. Coach Trotter's two wins were against Redlands and San Diego State, which did not join the SCIAC until 1926. Trotter left UCLA with a 2–13–1 record in three seasons (1920–1922). James J. Cline took over the Bruins football program as its third head coach in 1923. Coach Cline's two wins were against Loyola University and San Diego State. Cline was replaced after two seasons and a 2–10–3 record.

=== William Spaulding era (1925–1938) ===
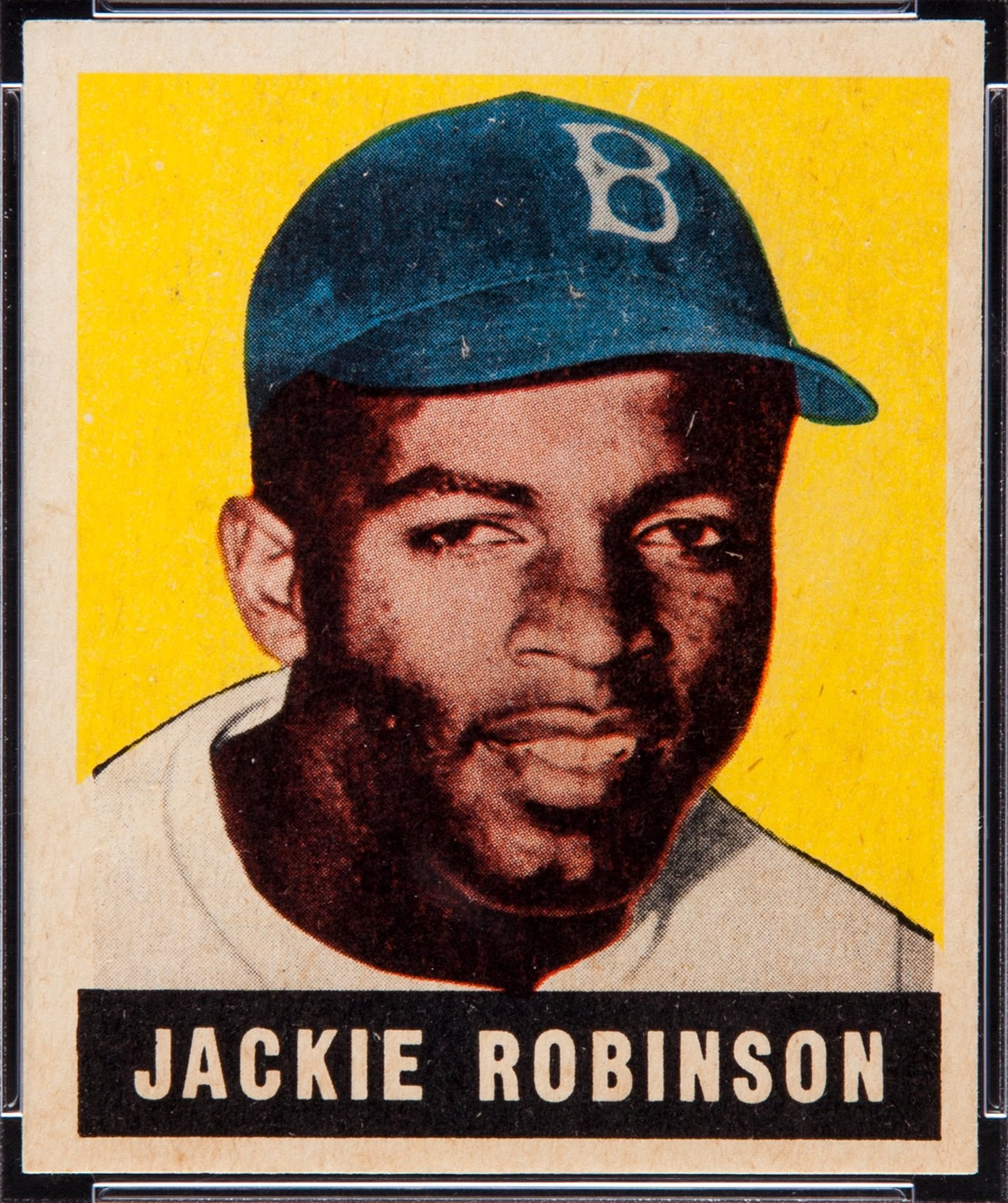
Jackie Robinson (who broke baseball's color barrier) played on the Bruins from 1939 to 1940

William H. Spaulding came to UCLA from Minnesota in 1925. As the Bruins head coach, his overall record in 14 seasons was 72–51–8. During his tenure in Los Angeles, Spaulding led the Bruins to their first bowl appearance and victory, the 1938 Poi Bowl. Also during Spaulding's tenure, the Bruins left the SCIAC and joined the Pacific Coast Conference beginning in 1928. Spaulding's 72 wins rank him among the best in head coaching victories in Bruin football history. He retired after a successful fourteen-season tenure ended after the 1938 season.

=== Edwin Horrell era (1939–1944) ===
Edwin C. Horrell was promoted to head coach following Spaulding's retirement. His 1942 UCLA Bruins team lost to Georgia in the 1943 Rose Bowl. He was the first coach to lead a UCLA team to defeat rival USC. It was the first football victory in the UCLA–USC rivalry. The most notable player who played for Horrell at UCLA was Jackie Robinson, who went on to a Hall of Fame career in professional baseball. Horrell's 1939 team compiled a 6–0–4 and his 1941 team posted a 5–5–1 record. With the exception of the 1942 season, the combined record of the Bruins during Horrell's tenure outside the aforementioned seasons was 6–22–1. These struggles led to Horrell's firing after six seasons at the helm of UCLA football.

=== Bert LaBrucherie era (1945–1949) ===
Coach Bert LaBrucherie was hired by his alma mater to replace Horrell. LaBrucherie's overall record at UCLA was 23–16. In his second year as head coach, the Bruins were Pacific Coast Conference champions, but lost to Illinois in the 1947 Rose Bowl. LaBrucherie's Bruins only posted one losing season during his four seasons, a 3–7 1948 season in what turned out to be his final season. LaBrucherie accepted the position of head football coach at California Institute of Technology after the 1948 season, departing UCLA. Coach LaBrucherie's 1946 team produced a perfect 10–0 season, with dominant victories until their loss to Illinois in the 1947 Rose Bowl.

=== Red Sanders era (1949–1957) ===
Red Sanders came to UCLA from Vanderbilt. He was arguably the best coach in school history, with an overall record of 66–19–1 (.773) at UCLA and earned the school its only national championship in football in 1954. As head coach of the Bruins, Sanders led them to three Pacific Coast Conference (PCC) titles, two Rose Bowls (1953 and 1955 seasons) and to a 6–3 record over arch-rival USC. Sanders instituted the distinctive football uniforms worn by the Bruins when he replaced the navy blue jerseys with "baking powderkeg blue", added the shoulder stripe to give the impression of motion, and changed the number style from block to clarendon. Sanders said these changes were made to make it easier to see his Bruins on the grainy black and white game films of the time.

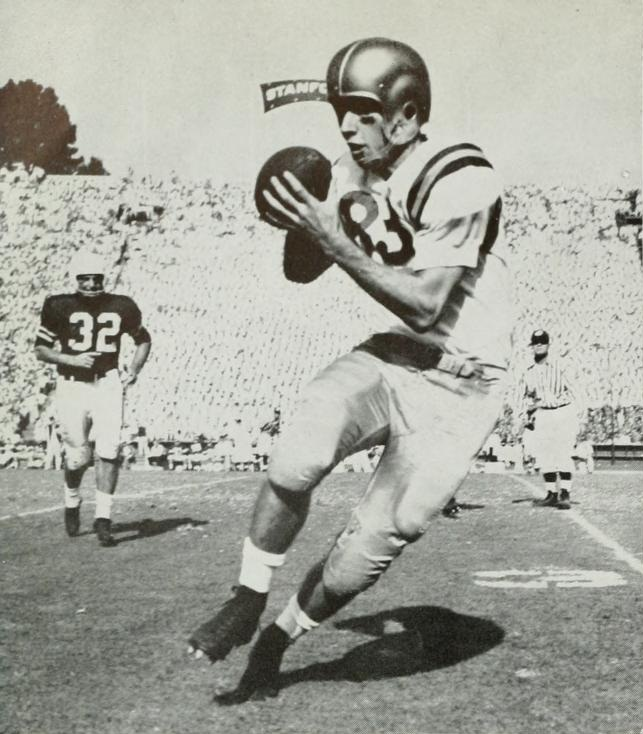
Bruin RB Johnny Hermann catching a pass in a 1955 game against Oregon State

The 1954 Bruins compiled a 9–0 record and climbed to the top of the Coaches' Poll, sharing the national championship with Ohio State, winner of the AP Poll's title. Due to the PCC's early "no repeat" rule, the undefeated Bruins were unable to compete in the Rose Bowl that season despite being the PCC champion. Second-place USC, who the Bruins beat 34–0, played in the 1955 Rose Bowl instead and lost to Big Ten Conference champion and eventual co-national champion Ohio State, 20–7. Henry Sanders was also known for intensifying the Bruins' rivalry with USC. His teams were always given a speech before the game against their cross-town rivals that always ended with "Beat SC!" A famous quote was attributed to Sanders regarding the rivalry, "Beating 'SC isn't a matter of life and death. It's more important than that."

Shortly before the 1958 season was set to begin, Sanders suffered a heart attack and died in a Los Angeles hotel. For his successes, he was inducted into the College Football Hall of Fame as a coach in 1996.

=== Bill Barnes era (1958–1964) ===
After the death of Red Sanders, assistant coach George W. Dickerson took over the Bruins on an interim basis before suffering a nervous breakdown. Then, a full-time head coach was hired. William F. Barnes was the head coach for the UCLA Bruins football team for seven seasons. He guided his teams to a 31–34–3 (.478) record. He did have two seven-win seasons in 1960 and 1961, leading the Bruins to the 1962 Rose Bowl. That year, the Bruins finished the season ranked No. 16 in the final AP poll. Barnes resigned after the 1964 season after learning that athletics director J.D. Morgan was not going to renew his contract.

=== Tommy Prothro era (1965–1970) ===
On January 11, 1965, Tommy Prothro was hired away from Oregon State as head coach of the UCLA Bruins. In the 1965 football season, the Bruins lost their season opening game 13–3 at Michigan State, who then rose to become the top-ranked team in the country. The unheralded Bruins would go on a seven-game undefeated streak, surprising national powers the likes of Syracuse and Penn State. Going into the 1965 UCLA–USC rivalry football game ranked No. 7, the conference championship and 1966 Rose Bowl were on the line. No. 6 USC, led by Heisman Trophy winner Mike Garrett led 16–6 until UCLA got a touchdown on a pass from Gary Beban to Dick Witcher with four minutes to play. After the two-point conversion made it 16–14, UCLA recovered an onside kick. Beban then hit Kurt Altenberg on a 50-yard bomb and UCLA won, 20–16. Integrated UCLA then faced all-white Tennessee in the newly built Liberty Bowl stadium in Memphis, Prothro's native city. On the last play of the game, Tennessee defensive back Bob Petrella intercepted a UCLA pass to save a Volunteer win by a score of 37–34. Tennessee's winning drive was aided by a controversial pass interference call, the clock had questionably stopped twice, and a dropped pass that appeared to be a lateral was recovered by UCLA, but was later ruled an incomplete forward pass. After the game, Prothro stated, "For the first time in my life, I am ashamed to be a Southerner." Prothro and the Bruins went on to completed the season with a dramatic pay-back upset victory over the No. 1 ranked Michigan State Spartans in the 1966 Rose Bowl, 14–12. This victory over the much stronger Spartans perpetuated the legend of the "Gutty little Bruins."

Heading into the final game of the 1966 season vs. USC, UCLA was 2–1 in conference games, 8–1 overall and ranked No. 5 in the country. The Bruins, featuring a "dream backfield" of All-Americans Gary Beban and Mel Farr, lost only one game, at rainy Washington, 16–3, where Huskies' head coach Jim Owens had devoted his entire season to beating Prothro. UCLA had beaten UW the season before, 28–24, with Prothro's trick play, the Z-streak in which a receiver trots towards the sideline like he's going out of the game and then runs a streak pattern unguarded by the inattentive defender. USC was 4–0 in conference and 7–1 overall, having lost to unranked Miami. The Bruins and Trojans played a different number of conference due to uneven scheduling caused by new AAWU members Oregon and Oregon State and schedules made years in advance. It was widely assumed that only losses would be considered and the winner of the 1966 UCLA-USC game would go to the 1967 Rose Bowl. UCLA star quarterback Gary Beban broke his ankle the week before in a win over Stanford, but backup Norman Dow, making his first and only start at quarterback, led UCLA to a 14–7 win. That left USC with a 4–1 conference record (7–2 overall) and No. 5 UCLA with a 3–1 conference record (9–1) overall.

Due to their win over USC, it was widely assumed UCLA would get the Rose Bowl berth. However, a vote the next Monday among the AAWU conference athletic directors awarded USC the Rose Bowl berth. It was speculated that the directors believed Beban could not play for UCLA in the Rose Bowl due to the broken ankle, thereby giving the Big Ten Conference representative, Purdue, a better chance to win. As it turned out, Beban could have played. But a bigger reason was that this was to make up for 1964 when Oregon State was voted in ahead of USC. The coach of Oregon State in 1964 was Prothro. Another speculation was the vote was against UCLA out of pure jealousy by the rest of the conference, which voted 7–1 for the clearly inferior team. This vote deprived Prothro of being the first coach to earn three consecutive Rose Bowl berths and UCLA athletic director J.D. Morgan called it a "gross injustice" and the "a dark day in UCLA and AAWU Athletic history." Inflamed UCLA students who had gathered for the Rose Bowl celebration rally, took to the streets of Westwood in protest and actually blocked the 405 Freeway for a short time. Ironically, Morgan was the force behind establishing a tie-breaking method adopted by the conference one year later in which only loss column counted; the first tiebreaker was head-to-head results, followed by overall record. If there was still a tie, the Rose Bowl berth would go to the team that had not played in the Rose Bowl the longest. But it was too late for UCLA. In their final game, USC made the AAWU decision look bad by losing to No. 1 Notre Dame, 51–0. They went on to lose the Rose Bowl as well to Purdue, 14–13, finishing the season at 7–4.

In 1967, Prothro helped a second quarterback capture the Heisman Trophy when Gary Beban was awarded the trophy after the regular season. He would bring his No. 1 ranked UCLA Bruin team to face No. 2 USC in one of the "Games of the Century". Despite playing with cracked ribs, Beban threw for 301 yards, but UCLA lost, 21–20, on a spectacular 64-yard run by O. J. Simpson in the 1967 USC vs. UCLA football game. Another big factor was UCLA's acclaimed sophomore kicker Zenon Andusyshyn missing a chip shot field goal, and having two field goals and an extra point attempt blocked. In what was acknowledged to be a rebuilding year, the Bruins opened the 1968 season with a 63–7 defeat of Pittsburgh and a win over Washington State. The season ground to a halt at Syracuse and with the season-ending injury of quarterback Billy Bolden, and UCLA would win only one more game, over Stanford 20–17. The Bruins gave No. 1 USC and Heisman Trophy winner O. J. Simpson a scare in a 28–16 loss; UCLA trailed 21–16 late in the fourth quarter and had the ball inside USC's 10-yard line, but USC recovered a fumble and then used almost all of the remaining time in driving for their insurance touchdown.

1969 was the year Prothro had geared his recruiting efforts towards as he believed this was his best team and was capable of contending for the national championship. The Bruins, quarterbacked by a sensational Junior College transfer Dennis Dummit discovered by Prothro, were undefeated until they faced No. 10 Stanford in Palo Alto. Once again, Prothro was let down by now senior kicker Zenon Andrusyshyn as he missed a short field goal late in the game with the score tied 20–20. Suddenly, two long Jim Plunkett passes had Stanford in field goal range in the final seconds, but UCLA blocked Steve Horowitz's attempt to preserve the tie. Once again, the UCLA-USC game would decide the Pac-8 title and the 1970 Rose Bowl berth. UCLA was ranked 6th with a 5–0–1 record in conference and 8–0–1 overall USC was No. 5 and was 6–0 in conference and 8–0–1 overall (tied Notre Dame in South Bend, 14–14); UCLA and USC were both unbeaten coming into their rivalry game for the first time since 1952. UCLA scored midway through the fourth quarter to take a 12–7 lead (knowing he need a win and not a tie to advance to the Rose Bowl, Prothro had the Bruins go for two after each touchdown and each attempt failed). USC then drove to the winning touchdown with 1:38 to play to win 14–12. The Trojans were aided by two controversial calls; the first was a dubious pass interference call on UCLA's Danny Graham on a 4th-and-10 incompletion. Secondly, on the winning touchdown pass reception, USC receiver Sam Dickerson appeared to be either out of bounds, out of the back of the end zone, or both. This loss supposedly was harder for Prothro to take than the 1967 loss and the freak officiating calls resembled the debacle at Tennessee in 1965.

In what turned out to be his final season at UCLA, Prothro's team suffered a rash of key injuries and finished 6–5, yet they were three close games from a 9–2 season and Rose Bowl berth. Before those injuries set in, UCLA took a 3–0 record into Austin to play defending national champ and top ranked Texas. Trailing 13–3 at the half, UCLA rallied and had a 17–13 lead in the final minute. But with 12 seconds left, Texas completed a long pass when their receiver caught the ball between two UCLA defenders, who then collided, allowing the receiver to score. UCLA also blew a 20-point fourth quarter lead against Oregon, when Ducks sophomore quarterback Dan Fouts rallied his team to three touchdowns and a 41–40 win. Finally, there came the showdown with Stanford; the game was expected to be a shootout between UCLA quarterback Dennis Dummit and Heisman winner Jim Plunkett. But the defenses ruled as UCLA took a 7–6 lead into the 4th quarter. Stanford took a 9–7 lead on a field goal, but UCLA was driving to a potential game-winning field goal or touchdown themselves when they completed a pass inside the Stanford 10-yard-line, only to have the receiver get sandwiched by two defenders on the tackle and fumble. This game ultimately decided the Pac-8 championship and 1971 Rose Bowl representative. The season ended on a high note however, when UCLA beat rival USC, 45–20, in a game that was not that close. This would end up being Prothro's final game at UCLA. Prothro was frustrated by bizarre officiating at critical moments, numerous last minute narrow losses, and losing out of the Rose Bowl by the conference vote in 1966. Prothro also decried the Pac-8 rule that only allowed the conference champion to go to a bowl game; he witnessed many lower ranked inferior teams from the Big Eight, Southeastern and Southwest conferences (often ones he defeated during the season) go to bowl games while his Bruins stayed home. After George Allen was fired by the Los Angeles Rams, Prothro accepted that job, leaving the Bruins after six seasons and a 41–18–3 record. Prothro was inducted into the College Football Hall of Fame as a coach in 1991.

=== Pepper Rodgers era (1971–1973) ===
Pepper Rodgers came to UCLA from Kansas after the departure of Prothro. In Rodgers' three seasons at the helm of the Bruins, UCLA finished 2–7–1, 8–3 and 9–2. In 1972, the Bruins began the season with a 20–17 victory over two-time defending national champion Nebraska, and finished the season ranked No. 17 and No. 15 in the final Coaches' and AP polls, respectively. In 1973, the Bruins finished ranked No. 9 and No. 12 in the final Coaches' and AP polls, respectively. Rodgers surprised UCLA fans, players and administration by deciding to accept the head football coach position at his alma mater, Georgia Tech after the 1973 season. He left the Bruins after compiling a 19–12–1 overall record.

=== Dick Vermeil era (1974–1975) ===
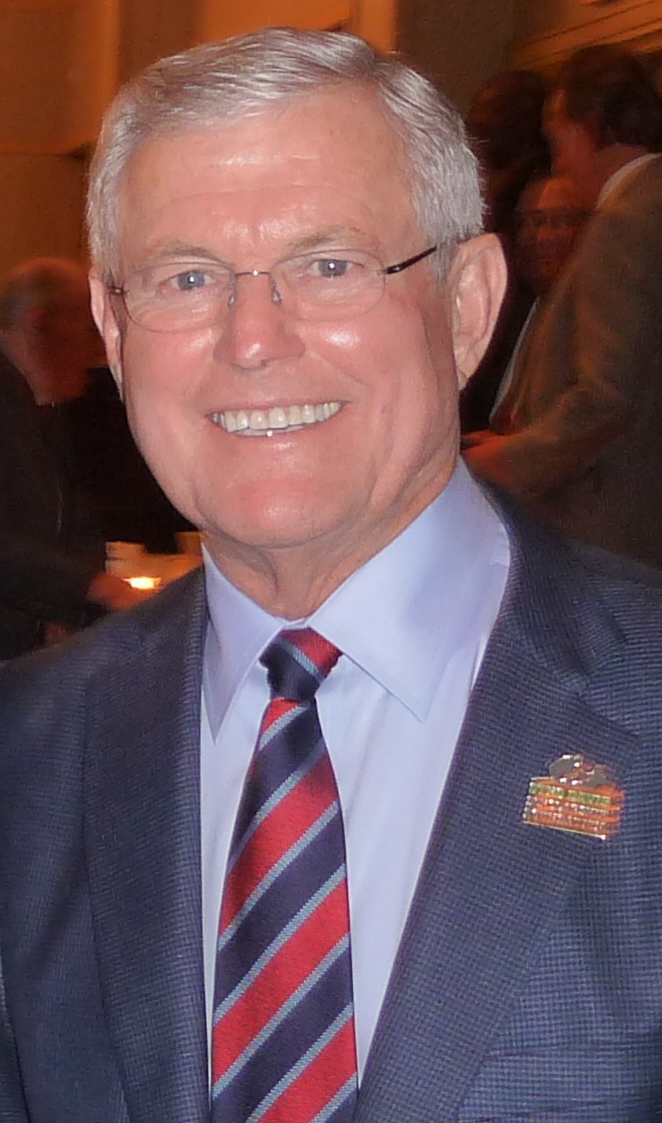
Coach Dick Vermeil was inducted to the Pro Football Hall of Fame in 2022.

As head coach at UCLA, Dick Vermeil compiled a 15–5–3 record in two seasons (1974–1975), including a 9–2–1 record in 1975 when he led the Bruins to their first conference championship in 10 years, and a win in the Rose Bowl over undefeated and No. 1 ranked Ohio State. Vermeil won Pac-8 Coach of the Year honors in 1975. Vermeil became the second out of three UCLA head coaches (and third in a row to leave UCLA for another job) to leave for the NFL when he accepted on offer to become head coach of the Philadelphia Eagles. His final record as head coach of the Bruins is 15–5–3.

=== Terry Donahue era (1976–1995) ===
Terry Donahue was promoted from assistant coach to head coach of the Bruins football team following Vermeil's departure. Donahue has the most conference wins of any head coach in Pacific-10 Conference history (98) and also the most wins in UCLA football history (151). His teams compiled a record of 8–4–1 in bowl games and were the first to win a bowl game in seven consecutive seasons. Donahue's UCLA teams won or shared five Pacific-10 Conference championships and won three Rose Bowls (1983, 1984, and 1986). Donahue's record was 10–9–1 against USC in the UCLA–USC rivalry. His teams won four New Year's Day bowl games in a row from 1983 to 1986.

Donahue retired from coaching after 20 seasons and was inducted into the College Football Hall of Fame as a coach in 2000. His final record is 151–74–8.

=== Bob Toledo era (1996–2002) ===
Bob Toledo was promoted from offensive coordinator to head coach of the Bruins after Donahue's retirement. In 1996, his first season as head coach, the Bruins finished with a 5–6 record. The highlight of the season was a comeback win over USC.

The 1997 team finished as co-champions of the Pacific-10 Conference with Washington State. However, with Washington State defeating the Bruins in the season opener, the Cougars earned the right to play in the Rose Bowl. The highlights of that season were a 66–3 win over Texas and a victory at the Cotton Bowl Classic over Texas A&M, and a victory over USC. The 1998 season started out as one of the best in the history of UCLA football. The team was high enough in the BCS standings to merit entry to the national championship game, and all UCLA needed to do was beat unranked University of Miami, who were major underdogs after a 66–13 loss to Syracuse the week before. UCLA was also coming off of their eighth consecutive victory over USC and 20th straight win overall. However, Miami won 49–45, ending UCLA's chances of playing in the national championship game. They instead settled for a trip to the Rose Bowl as Pac-10 champions, but lost to Wisconsin. This is seen as the turning point for the UCLA football program.

The 1999 season was a major disappointment, with the team finishing 4–7. This was the first year that USC had defeated them in the annual rivalry since 1990. The year also had the dubious distinction of a 55–7 loss to Pac-10 foe Oregon State, the worst defeat of the Bruins in 69 years. In 2000, the Bruins finished 6–6 with a loss in the Sun Bowl, again against Wisconsin. The 2001 season started with promise as the Bruins got off to a fast start with a 6–0 record. However, four straight losses to Stanford, Washington State, Oregon, and USC, the Bruins faded out of postseason contention.

UCLA finished off 8–5 in Toledo's final season in 2002. The team finished 7–5 in the regular season, but Toledo was fired after a fourth straight loss to USC. The Bruins did reach the Las Vegas Bowl and interim coach Ed Kezirian coached—and won—his only game in charge of the program. Toledo finished with a record of 49–32, for a winning percentage of .605, including one winning streak of 20 consecutive victories, a school record. Toledo's greatest accomplishment with the team may have been in the 1997 season, where the team finished 10–2 with a victory over Texas A&M in the Cotton Bowl Classic. Toledo's Bruins were 3–4 against UCLA's cross-town archrival, the USC Trojans.

=== Karl Dorrell era (2003–2007) ===
Longtime college and NFL assistant Karl Dorrell was brought in to revive the glory of the UCLA football program, his alma mater, after Toledo was fired. Dorrell also was brought in to UCLA to clean up a program marred by off-the-field problems in the final years of Bob Toledo's tenure, most notably, the handicap placard scandal. He was the first African American head football coach in UCLA football history.

Dorrell's UCLA Bruins team recorded a mark of 6–7 in his first season as head coach in 2003, with an appearance in the Silicon Valley Bowl, and a loss to Fresno State. In 2004, his second season, the team finished with a record of 6–6 an appearance in the Las Vegas Bowl, with a loss to Wyoming.

In 2005, his third season as head football coach, Dorrell was able get his first win against a ranked opponent, No. 21 Oklahoma, featuring Adrian Peterson. On October 1, 2005, head coach Tyrone Willingham and his Washington Huskies came to the Rose Bowl for a Pacific-10 Conference game to play UCLA. This was the first time two black head coaches faced each other in a Pac-10 conference game. At the time, Sylvester Croom of Mississippi State was the only other black coach heading an NCAA Division I football program. Dorrell achieved his first win against a top-ten opponent with a 47–40 upset win over No. 10-ranked rival California. Three Bruin wins in the 2005 season set new school records for biggest comebacks earning the nickname "The Cardiac Kids." They came thanks largely to the heroics of quarterback Drew Olson and tailback Maurice Jones-Drew. In the regular season the Bruins came from down 21 points to win in overtime against both Washington State and Stanford. In the Stanford comeback, the Bruins scored 21 points in the final 7:04 of the fourth quarter. In the Sun Bowl, the Bruins set the record again by coming back from 22 points down. The Bruins were ranked No. 7 in the nation until a 52–14 blowout loss to a 3–8 Arizona team. The Bruins came into the UCLA–USC rivalry last regular season game ranked No. 11. They suffered a 66–19 defeat to the No. 1 2005 USC Trojans football team. This was the largest margin of defeat since the series began in 1929 with a 76–0 defeat. The Bruins finished third in the Pac-10 standings. On December 30, 2005, his Bruins defeated the Northwestern Wildcats in the Sun Bowl, 50–38, finishing the season with a 10–2 record. At the end of the 2005 season, Dorrell received pay bonuses for coaching successful seasons. He was named Pac-10 co-coach of the year along with USC head coach Pete Carroll.

In 2006, Dorrell's fourth season, the Bruins finished the season 7–6 (5–4 in conference) and finished fourth-place in the Pac-10. UCLA played its first game at the University of Notre Dame since the 1960s and was leading 17–13, but the Irish scored a touchdown in the final minute to win. The most notable victory of his coaching career at UCLA was a 13–9 defeat of No. 2-ranked and Bowl Championship Series title-game-bound USC on December 2, 2006. The win kept the Trojans out of the title game and broke a seven-game UCLA losing streak to the Trojans, thereby preserving the Bruins' eight-game win streak over USC from 1991 to 1998 as the longest run in the history of the rivalry. The victory also clinched a winning season for UCLA. The Bruins played in the Emerald Bowl in San Francisco against a Bobby Bowden-coached Florida State team on December 27, 2006, and lost, 44–27.

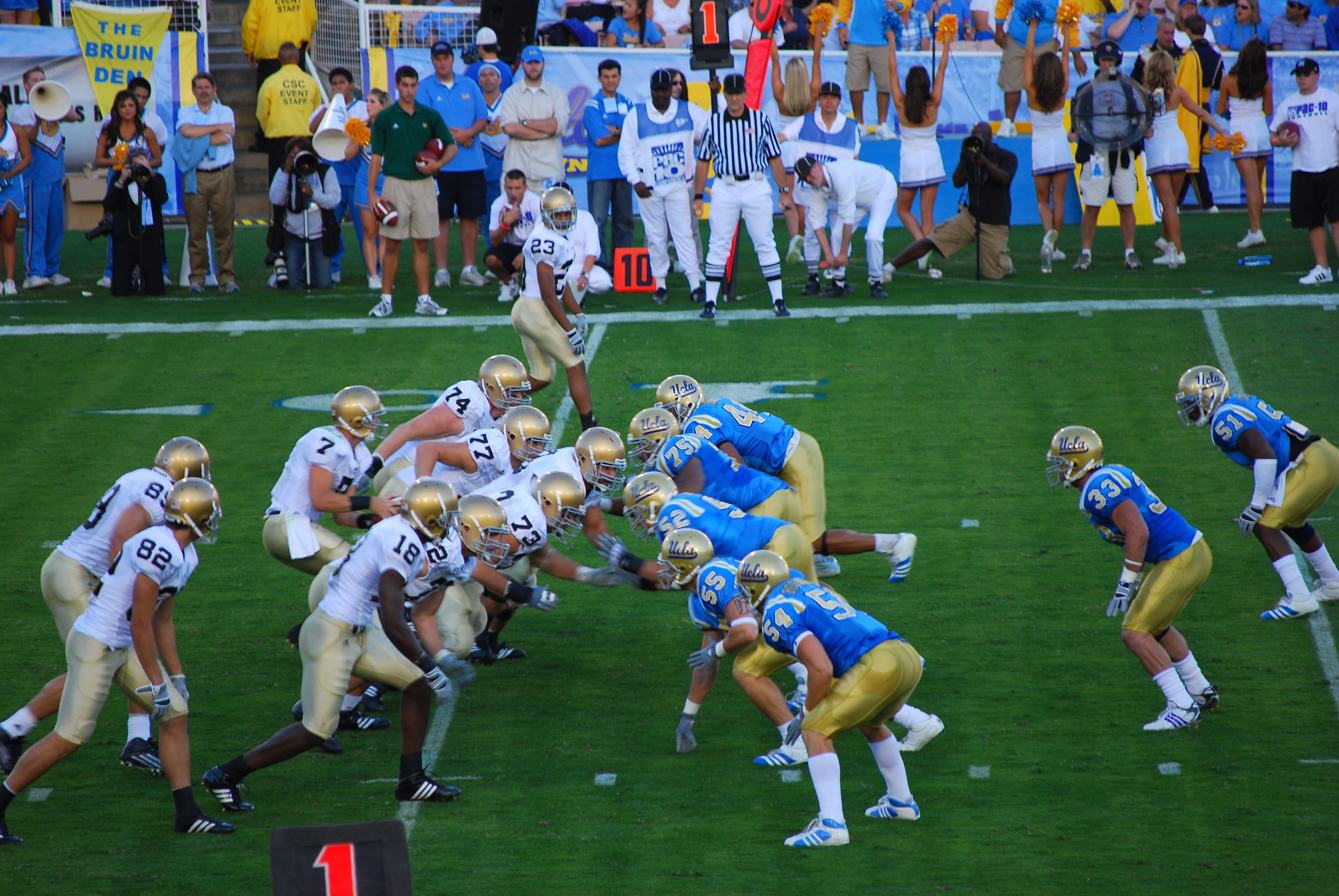
UCLA on defense against Notre Dame in a 2007 matchup

In Dorrell's fifth season at UCLA, with 20 returning starters and a team of his own recruits, hopes were high for the Bruins in 2007. After starting the season with a couple of wins over Stanford and BYU, and achieving a No. 11 AP Poll ranking, however, UCLA stumbled against an injured, winless, and unranked Utah team, 44–6. Four weeks later, Dorrell's Bruins fell again; this time 20–6 to an unranked, winless Notre Dame team. The Bruins did, however, post wins against seemingly more difficult Pac-10 opponents, including a No. 10 Cal team. However; the bad taste of losses to teams the Bruins were favored to beat (including an embarrassing 27–7 loss to Washington State) raised questions about Dorrell's play-calling and ability to motivate his players. After the Washington State loss, UCLA Athletic Director Dan Guerrero addressed UCLA's inconsistent football performances for the first time, stating "I will be very interested to see how we finish the season. And you can use that." Many took this as a hint that Dorrell's job might be in serious jeopardy. The Bruins would go on to lose to Arizona and Arizona State by a combined score of 58–47, but surprisingly shut out an Oregon Ducks team that a week earlier lost starting quarterback and Heisman Trophy Candidate Dennis Dixon to a knee injury. Heading into the final game of the regular season against crosstown-rival USC, the Bruins still had an outside chance at a Rose Bowl berth that might have saved Dorrell's job; with a victory over USC and some help from Arizona (with a win over ASU), the Bruins could have been the first-ever five-loss team to play in the Rose Bowl. It wasn't to be, however, and the Bruins finished the 2007 Regular season with a miserable offensive performance in a 24–7 loss to USC and a record of 6–6.

On December 3, 2007, Los Angeles papers and the Associated Press reported that Karl Dorrell was fired during a meeting with athletic director Dan Guerrero. Dorrell was offered the choice, but decided not to coach in the Las Vegas Bowl. Defensive coordinator DeWayne Walker served as interim coach for the game, where UCLA lost to BYU.

=== Rick Neuheisel era (2008–2011) ===
On December 29, 2007, Baltimore Ravens offensive coordinator Rick Neuheisel, formerly head coach at Colorado and Washington, was brought back to his alma mater and hired as UCLA's 15th head football coach after his former Bruins teammate Dorrell was fired. Neuheisel coined the phrase "Passion Bucket" during an interview on The Dan Patrick Show by saying, "When you're at UCLA, you have to have your passion bucket full when you play the Trojans."

Neuheisel had his first win on September 1 as the Bruins' head coach as they defeated No. 18 Tennessee, 27–24. The win came in overtime as Tennessee's field goal try sailed wide left. However, the team's momentum came to a halt in successive weeks. A brutal 59–0 defeat on the road at the hands of No. 15 BYU was followed by a disappointing 31–10 loss at home to unranked Arizona in the Bruins' Pac-10 opener. The UCLA offense failed to score a touchdown in either contest. The team finished the season 4–8 overall and 3–6 in conference.

Despite this record, Neuheisel was still able secure the fifth-best recruiting class in the nation in 2009 as rated by Scout.com. The class was headlined by Morrell Presley, Randall Carroll, offensive linemen Xavier Sua-Filo and Stan Hasiak, and running back Damien Thigpen. The 2009 season showed signs of improvement, with a potential bright future ahead, finishing 7–6 with a bowl win over Temple. The UCLA 2010 recruiting class was strong, as Neuheisel swayed many recruits away from USC. Nevertheless, the Bruins fell to 4–8 in 2010, losing six of their last seven games and failing to receive a bowl berth. Player injuries and other attrition depleted UCLA of its roster depth, while true freshmen were forced into action and seniors who were previously reserves became starters; a quarterback who had attempted only 17 passes in his career became the starter. At the end of the season Neuheisel fired two assistant coaches, including Chow, and said he would "be crushed ... if we're not going to a bowl game a year from now." The 2011 season brought about continued mediocre performance, although the team's record improved to 6–6 in regular season play. Despite the lackluster overall record, the Bruins won the first Pac-12 South Division title, as crosstown rival USC was ineligible due to NCAA sanctions. A 50–0 shutout loss to USC to end the regular season—UCLA's fifth consecutive loss to the Trojans—prompted speculation that Neuheisel would be fired. Neuheisel was fired as head coach of UCLA on November 28, 2011. He was allowed to coach his final game at the December 2, Pac-12 Conference football Championship game, where the team lost 49–31 to the Oregon Ducks.

=== Jim Mora era (2012–2017) ===
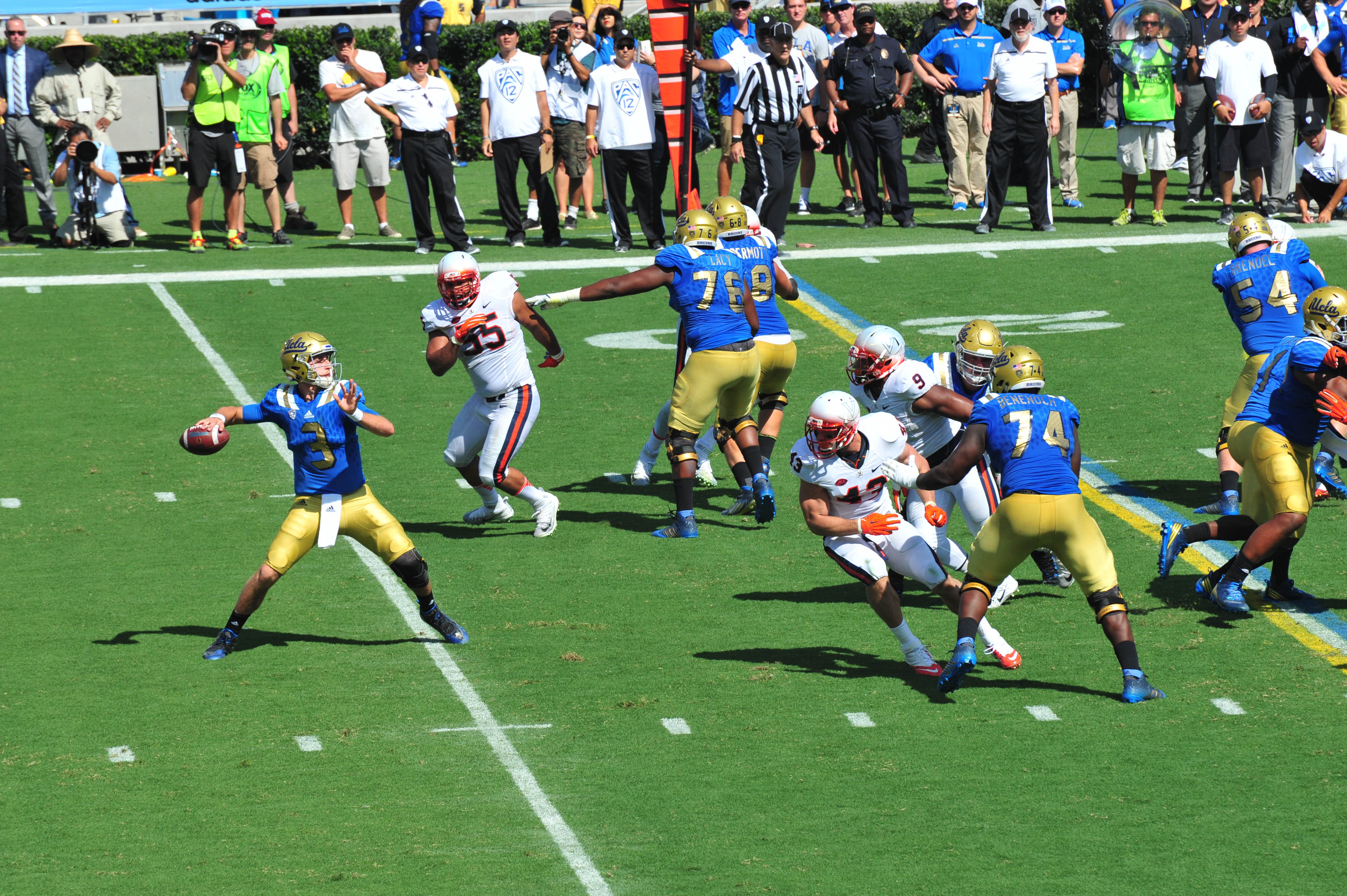
QB Josh Rosen of UCLA passing against Virginia in 2015

On December 10, 2011, UCLA athletics director Dan Guerrero announced the hiring of former Atlanta Falcons and Seattle Seahawks head coach, Jim L. Mora, as the Bruins' 16th head football coach. Mora signed a three-year contract. The results of the new regime came early, as UCLA landed a consensus No. 12 ranked recruiting class in 2012 after having a class ranked in the high 40s at Neuheisel's departure. In Mora's first season, the Bruins finished 9–5 capped with a loss in the 2012 Holiday Bowl.

In Mora's second season, the Bruins improved to 10–3, capping the season with a victory in the 2013 Sun Bowl. Behind the leadership of quarterback Brett Hundley, the Bruins came within one game of reaching the Pac-12 championship game and beat crosstown rivals USC for the second straight year. In 2014, the Bruins finished 10–3 again. The team beat rival USC for the third straight year and won the Alamo Bowl against Kansas State. Paul Perkins led the Pac-12 in rushing with 1,575 yards.

Mora's fourth season in 2015 saw the arrival of freshman quarterback Josh Rosen, a rash of injuries, and erratic play by the offense. The Bruins finished 8–5, including a loss to Nebraska in the Foster Farms Bowl. The Bruins finished 4–8 in 2016. In the 2017 season opener, Rosen completed 35 of 59 passes for 491 yards and four touchdowns to rally UCLA to a 45–44 win over Texas A&M. The Bruins overcame a 34-point deficit, the largest comeback in school history and the second-most ever in the Football Bowl Subdivision (FBS). (Note: Michigan State had a 35-point comeback win over Northwestern in 2006.) On November 19, 2017, UCLA announced the firing of Mora following 23–28 loss to USC at the Coliseum.

=== Chip Kelly era (2018–2023) ===
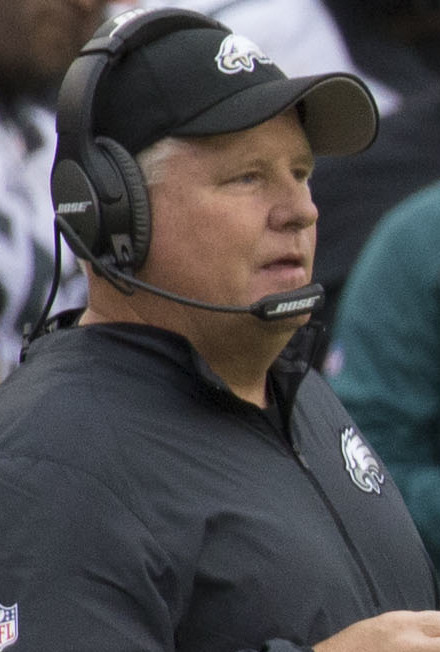
Coach Chip Kelly

On November 25, 2017, former Oregon and Philadelphia Eagles head coach Chip Kelly was hired as the head football coach at UCLA. He had also interviewed for the Florida head coach position. Kelly arrived with a reputation as an offensive mastermind who had overseen explosive and very successful teams at Oregon. Kelly signed a five-year contract worth $23.3 million. In his first season in 2018, the Bruins began the year 0–5 for the first time since 1943. However, they later defeated USC to snap a three-game losing streak against their crosstown rivals. UCLA finished the season with a 3–9 record, their worst since going 2–7–1 in 1971.

The next season, the Bruins started 0–3, with losses to Cincinnati, San Diego State, and No. 5 Oklahoma, all by multiple scores. Under Kelly, the Bruins started 0–3 in back-to-back seasons for the first time since 1920–1921. The 0–3 start to the 2019 season gave Kelly the worst 15-game start as a UCLA football coach since Harry Trotter. However, when the Bruins played No. 19 Washington State the following week, they erased a 49–17 deficit and won, 67–63. The 32-point comeback was the third-largest in FBS history. Two weeks after the win over Washington State, the Bruins lost at home to Oregon State by a score of 48–31. This was only the Beavers' third road win over a Pac-12 opponent since 2014, and their largest road win over a Pac-12 opponent since their 49–17 win at California in 2013. The loss dropped the Bruins to a 1–5 record for the second consecutive year. After a bye week, the Bruins traveled to Stanford and defeated the Cardinal, 34–16. UCLA got its first win over Stanford since 2008, snapping an 11-game losing streak against the Cardinal. In the victory, the Bruins rushed for 263 yards on an average of 6.1 yards per carry, and they held the Cardinal to 198 total yards and just 55 rushing yards. On January 14, 2022, UCLA and Kelly agreed to terms on a four-year contract extension.

On March 3, 2023, UCLA Athletic Director, Martin Jarmond agreed to terms with Chip Kelly to sign a two-year contract extension that would have kept him with the Bruins through the 2027 season. Athletic Director Martin Jarmond cited the importance of coaching continuity while the program moved to the Big-10 Conference. However, on February 6, 2024, Kelly stepped down after six seasons leading the Bruins to become offensive coordinator for Ohio State. The departure in February left the program in a challenging situation due to the present recruiting and transfer portal timeline. While Kelly's tenure ended with a winning record (35–34), critics cite Kelly's failure to capitalize on Southern California recruiting and ability to stimulate interest with the fanbase. Many pundits and fans questioned Athletic Director Martin Jarmond's decision to retain Kelly while the program stagnated, but Jarmond pointed to the strong academic culture Kelly built while at UCLA.

=== DeShaun Foster era (2024–2025) ===
DeShaun Foster was hired as the head football coach at UCLA on February 12, 2024. Although Kelly's untimely departure after the close of the transfer portal period left Foster in a difficult position for the upcoming year, Foster exceeded offseason expectations by retaining the majority of the roster and improving the state of UCLA's NIL Collective. Foster faced a slow start to the 2024 season, which included away losses to LSU in Death Valley and #4 Penn State in Happy Valley as well as home losses to #1 Oregon and #8 Indiana at the Rose Bowl. Despite being underdogs in each of their final games, the Bruins finished their season strong winning four of their last five games, including wins over Iowa, Fresno State, Rutgers, and Nebraska.

On September 14, 2025, after an 0–3 start to his second season, Foster was fired by UCLA. He finished his head coaching tenure with a 5–10 record. Tim Skipper was named interim head coach for the remainder of the 2025 season.

=== Bob Chesney era (2026–present) ===
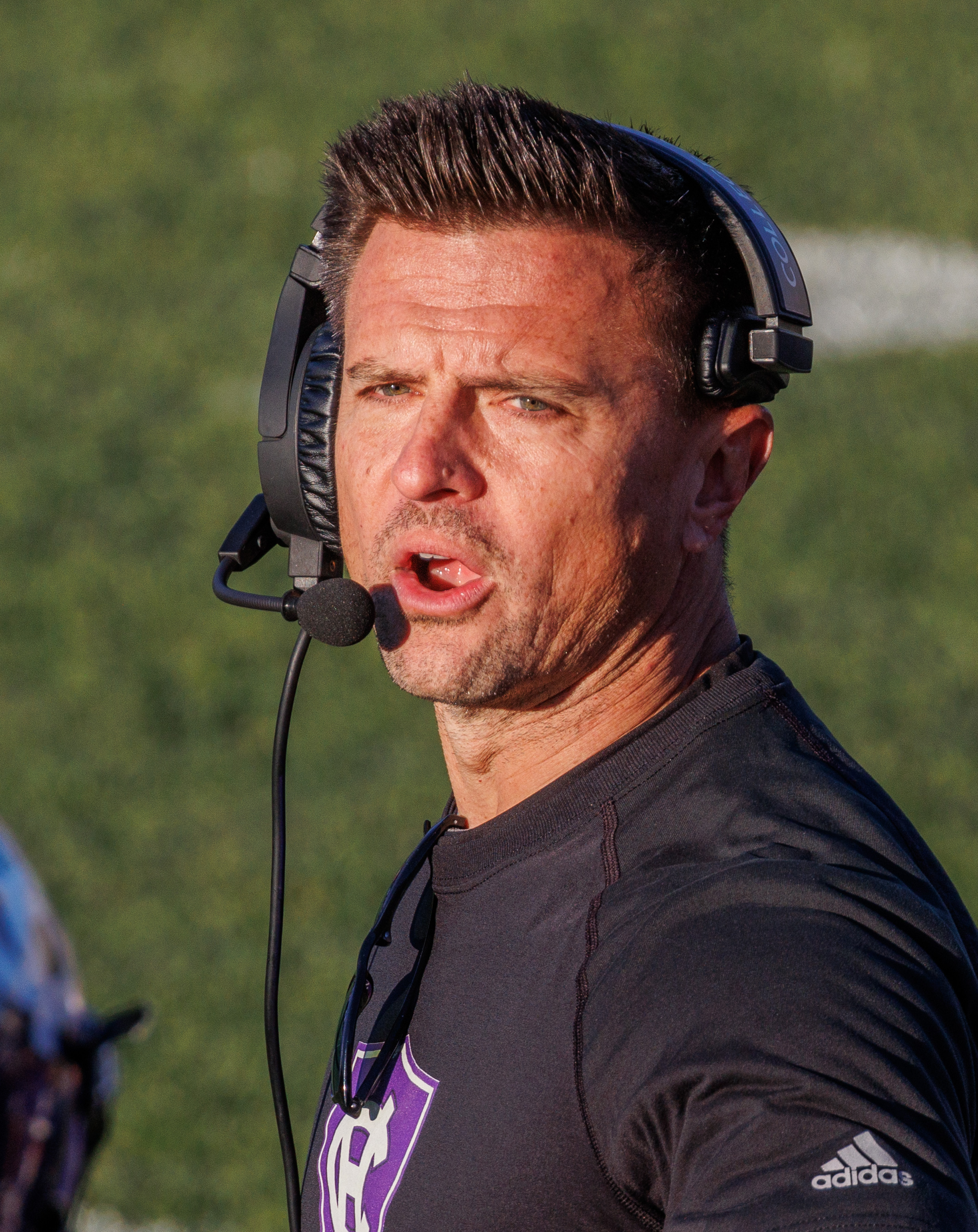
Bob Chesney

On December 1, 2025, Bob Chesney was announced as the Bruins' next head coach. The search for a new coach, involved a campus-wide committee of sports executives, former general managers, and UCLA players, in part to ensure the decision was guided by a broad group of stakeholders rather than solely by athletic director Martin Jarmond, given his past coaching hires. Chesney was permitted to continue coaching his former team, the James Madison Dukes, for the College Football Playoff.

== Conference affiliations ==
- Independent (1919)
- Southern California Intercollegiate Athletic Conference (1920–1927)
- Pac-12 Conference (1928–2024)
  - Pacific Coast Conference (1928–1958)
  - Athletic Association of Western Universities (1959–1967)
  - Pacific-8 Conference (1968–1977)
  - Pacific-10 Conference (1978–2010)
  - Pac-12 Conference (2011–2024)
- Big Ten Conference (2024–present)

== Championships ==
=== National championships ===
UCLA won the Coaches' Poll national championship in 1954 (shared with Ohio State who finished No. 1 in the final AP Poll). This consensus national championship is claimed by the school.

Year	Coach	Selectors	Record	Bowl	Final AP	Final Coaches
1954	Henry Russell Sanders	Dunkel, Football Research, FWAA, Helms, Litkenhous, National Championship Foundation, Coaches Poll	9–0 (6–0)	None ("no repeat rule" denied Rose Bowl)	No. 2	No. 1

=== Conference championships ===
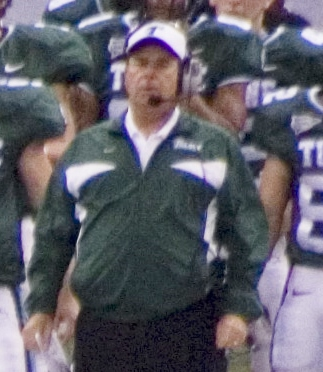
Bob Toledo is the last coach to guide UCLA to a conference championship.

UCLA has won 17 conference championships (six shared, 11 outright) as of the 2025 season.

Year	Coach	Conference	Overall record	Conference record
1935†	William H. Spaulding	PCC	8–2	4–1
1942	Edwin C. Horrell	PCC	7–4	6–1
1946	Bert LaBrucherie	PCC	10–1	7–0
1953	Red Sanders	PCC	8–2	6–1
1954	Red Sanders	PCC	9–0	6–0
1955	Red Sanders	PCC	9–2	6–0
1959†	William F. Barnes	AAWU	5–4–1	3–1
1961	William F. Barnes	AAWU	7–4	3–1
1965	Tommy Prothro	AAWU	8–2–1	4–0
1975†	Dick Vermeil	Pacific-8	9–2–1	6–1
1982	Terry Donahue	Pacific-10	10–1–1	5–1–1
1983	Terry Donahue	Pacific-10	7–4–1	6–1–1
1985	Terry Donahue	Pacific-10	9–2–1	6–2
1987†	Terry Donahue	Pacific-10	10–2	7–1
1993†	Terry Donahue	Pacific-10	8–4	6–2
1997†	Bob Toledo	Pacific-10	10–2	7–1
1998	Bob Toledo	Pacific-10	10–2	8–0

† Co-champions

=== Division championships ===
UCLA has won two division championships as of 2023.

Year	Division	Coach	Opponent	CG result
2011	Pac-12 South	Rick Neuheisel	Oregon	L 31–49
2012	Pac-12 South	Jim L. Mora	Stanford	L 24–27

== Rankings ==
UCLA football has finished Top 25 in the nation per the AP poll 32 times in school history.

1939	1942	1946	1951	1952	1953	1954	1955	1965	1966	1969	1972	1973	1975	1976	1978
7	13	4	17	6	5	2	4	4	5	13	15	12	5	15	14

1980	1982	1983	1984	1985	1986	1987	1988	1991	1993	1997	1998	2005	2013	2014	2022
13	5	17	9	7	14	9	6	19	18	5	8	16	16	10	21

== Head coaches ==
UCLA has had 20 head coaches.

Tenure	Seasons	Coach	Record	Win %
1919	1	Fred Cozens	2–6	.250
1920–1922	3	Harry Trotter	2–13–1	.156
1923–1924	2	James J. Cline	2–10–3	.233
1925–1938	14	William H. Spaulding	72–51–8	.580
1939–1944	6	Edwin C. Horrell	24–31–6	.443
1945–1948	4	Bert LaBrucherie	23–16	.590
1949–1957	9	Red Sanders	66–19–1	.773
1958–1964	7	William F. Barnes	31–34–3	.478
1965–1970	6	Tommy Prothro	41–18–3	.685
1971–1973	3	Pepper Rodgers	19–12–1	.609
1974–1975	2	Dick Vermeil	15–5–3	.717
1976–1995	20	Terry Donahue	151–74–8	.665
1996–2002	7	Bob Toledo	49–32	.605
2003–2007	5	Karl Dorrell	35–27	.565
2008–2011	4	Rick Neuheisel	21–29	.420
2012–2017	6	Jim L. Mora	46–30	.605
2018–2023	6.5	Chip Kelly	35–34	.507
2024–2025	1.25	DeShaun Foster	5–10	.333
2026–present	0	Bob Chesney	10-0	1.000

== Rivalries ==
=== California ===
The Bruins enjoy an annual rivalry with an in-state conference foe, the California Golden Bears. The rivals have faced each other 88 times, every year starting in 1933. As of November 28, 2017, UCLA leads the all-time series against Cal, Future contests of this rivalry is unknown, due to both schools leaving the Pac-12. In 2024, UCLA announced non-conference games against Cal from 2026 to 2029, with games being played at California Memorial Stadium in 2026 & 2028 and the Rose Bowl in 2027 & 2029.

=== Stanford ===
The West Coast in-state rivals have spent much of their respective athletics histories as members of the same conference; first the Pacific Coast Conference from 1925 to 1958 followed by the various predecessors of the modern day Pac-12 Conference from 1959 to 2023. The teams met annually from 1946 to 2023 without interruption. The rivalry has seen its fair share of excitement throughout its history, but reached its peak in the 21st century when both teams were consistently ranked in the top 25 and had numerous competitive games against each other. With the collapse of the Pac-12 following the 2023 season, which resulted in Stanford leaving to join the Atlantic Coast Conference (ACC) and UCLA accepting an invitation to join the Big Ten Conference, the annual series between the Cardinal and Bruins was put on hiatus. As of August 2025, there are no plans for the schools to meet again on the football field.

=== USC ===
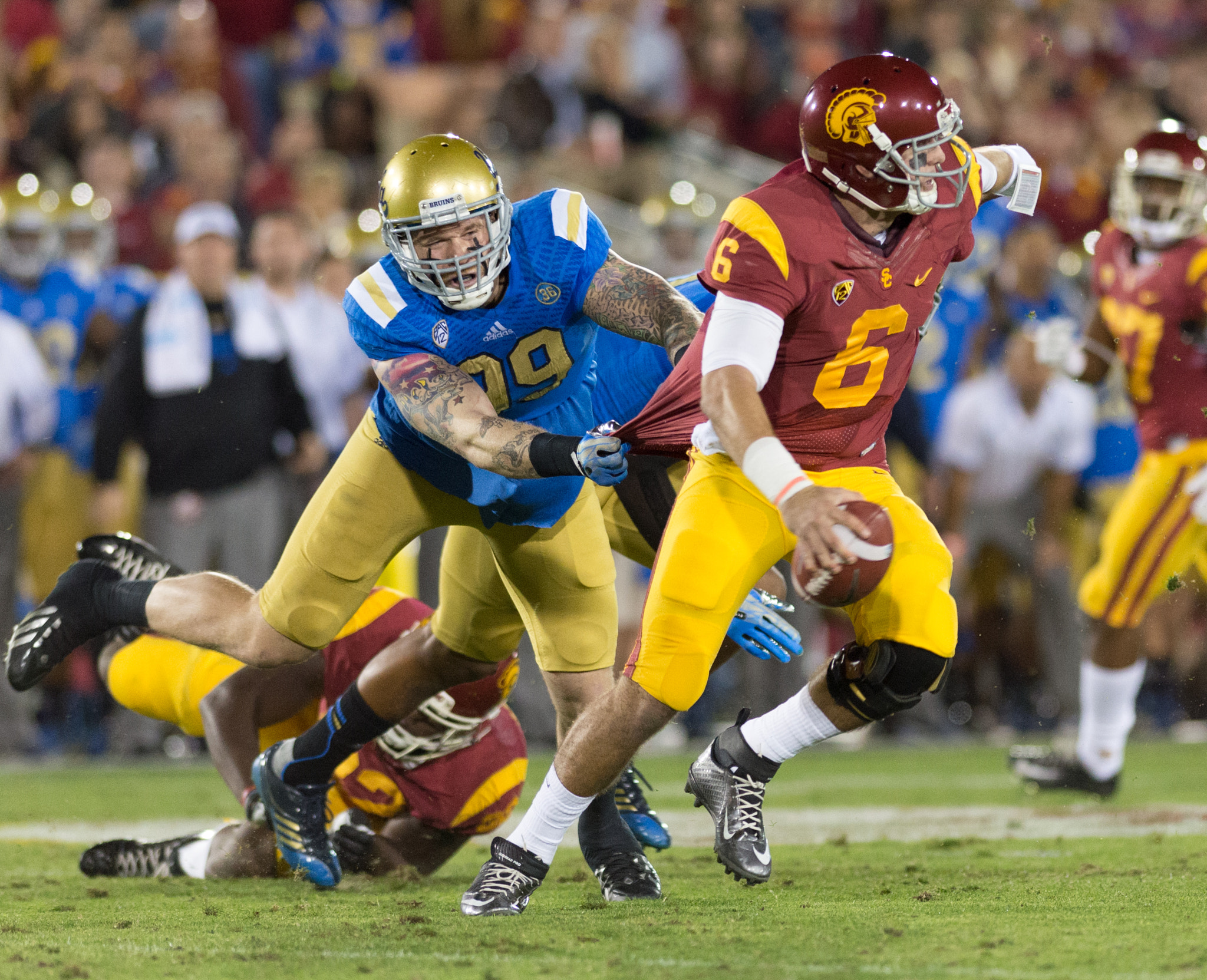
USC and UCLA both wear their home uniforms when playing each other. A tradition started due to the shared use of the Los Angeles Memorial Coliseum, it was resumed in 2008 after a 25-year absence due to NCAA rules.

UCLA's rivalry with USC is unusual in that they are one of a few pairs of Division I FBS programs that share a major city. Both are within the Los Angeles city limits, approximately 10 miles (16 km) apart. Until 1982, the two schools also shared the same stadium: the Los Angeles Memorial Coliseum.

The crosstown rivals play each year for city bragging rights and the Victory Bell, and (historically) often for the right to go to the Rose Bowl. USC leads the all-time series (2 Southern Cal victories vacated by the NCAA).

== Facilities ==
=== Stadiums ===
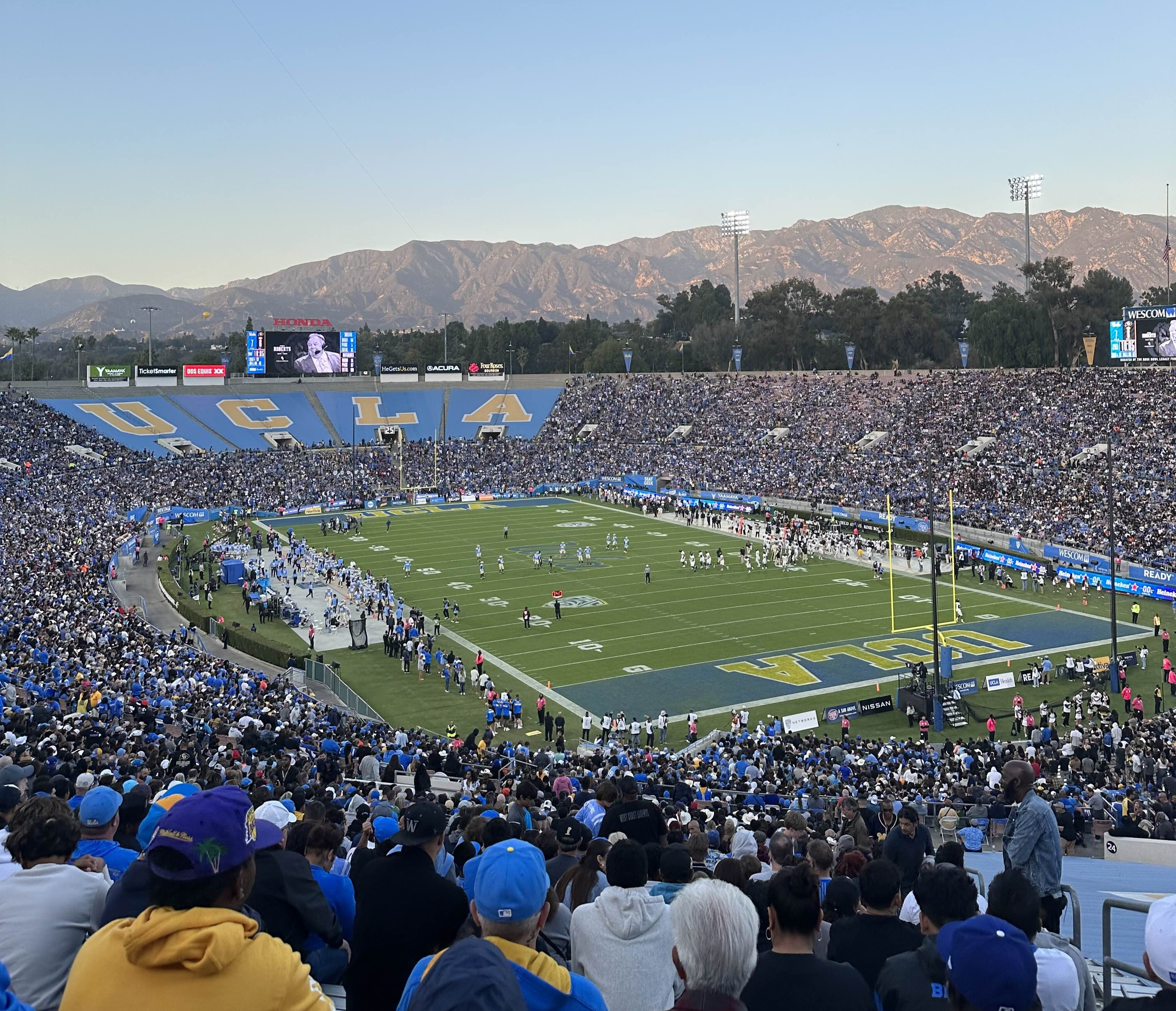
Inside view of the Rose Bowl. Colorado vs. UCLA, October 28th, 2023.

The Rose Bowl has been the home football field for the UCLA Bruins since the 1982 season. It is a National Historic Landmark located in Pasadena, California with an official capacity of 92,542.

From 1919 to 1927, the Bruins (then known as the Cubs) used Moore Field at the Vermont Ave. campus of the "Southern Branch of the University of California."

After joining the Pacific Coast Conference in 1928, the Bruins played their home games at the Los Angeles Memorial Coliseum until 1981.

An on-campus facility was discussed, but faced significant political opposition, including from the governor at the time, Edmund Gerald "Pat" Brown Sr. The Bruins had second priority in schedule at the Coliseum after the Trojans, but before the Los Angeles Rams. A 44,000-seat stadium on campus appeared in the 1963 Long range Plan, at the site where Drake Stadium eventually was built. However, the proposal was blocked by influential area residents, as well as other politicians. In addition, the Coliseum already was constructed by and is a facility of the State of California.

When the Oakland Raiders became the Los Angeles Raiders in 1982, and after arduous negotiations with the city of Pasadena, UCLA decided to move out of the Coliseum, relocating its home games to the Rose Bowl in 1982. The Raiders had demanded control of the facility and luxury box revenue at the Coliseum. UCLA has participated in five Rose Bowl games since moving to the stadium, including the 1983 Rose Bowl at the end of the Bruins' first season there.

In 1995, UCLA and the then Los Angeles Raiders almost became partners with the National Football League in a new stadium at Hollywood Park but the deal to build a stadium there was scuttled when Raiders owner Al Davis refused to accept a second NFL team at the proposed facility.

In November 2025, it was reported that the Bruins were planning on breaking their lease with the Rose Bowl to move to SoFi Stadium in Inglewood, the current home of the Los Angeles Rams and Los Angeles Chargers. The move has been met with negative reception from fans and analysts as well as a lawsuit from the city of Pasadena.

=== Spaulding Field ===
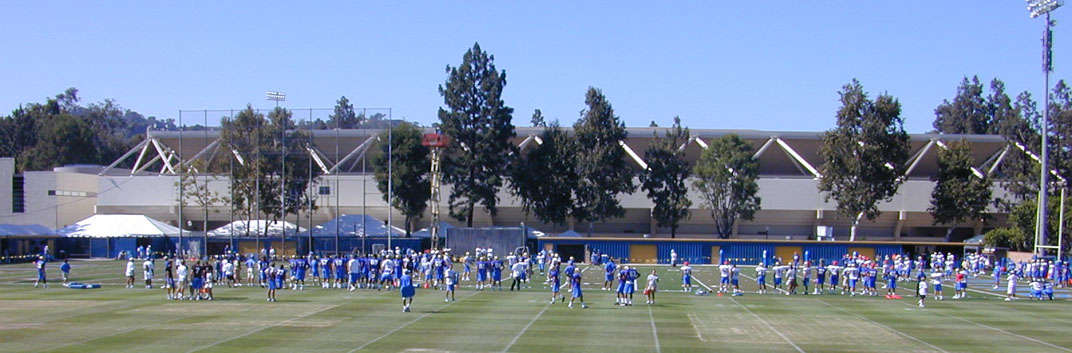
Fall football practices at Spaulding Field

The on-campus practice facility for the football team is Spaulding Field, which has two football fields, one grass and one artificial turf, or synthetic turf.

=== Wasserman Football Center ===
The Wasserman Football Center, built immediately west of Spaulding Field, was dedicated on August 1, 2017. Within the 75,000 square feet structure, there are training and treatment room, weight room, football facilities, the Troy Aikman Strength and Conditioning Center, and locker rooms. Also located in the center are coaches' offices, nutrition center, hydrotherapy pools, meeting rooms and the Terry and Andrea Donahue Team Auditorium. Other amenities include a barbershop, players' lounge, and recruiting lounge and terrace.

== Uniforms ==
From 2004 to 2017, the official UCLA athletic colors were "True Blue" and gold. The "True Blue" is a slightly darker shade than the previous powder blue worn by teams.

In the early days of the school, UCLA had the same colors as the California Golden Bears: Yale Blue and California Gold. Blue symbolized the ocean, while gold represented the state of California, known as the "Golden State".

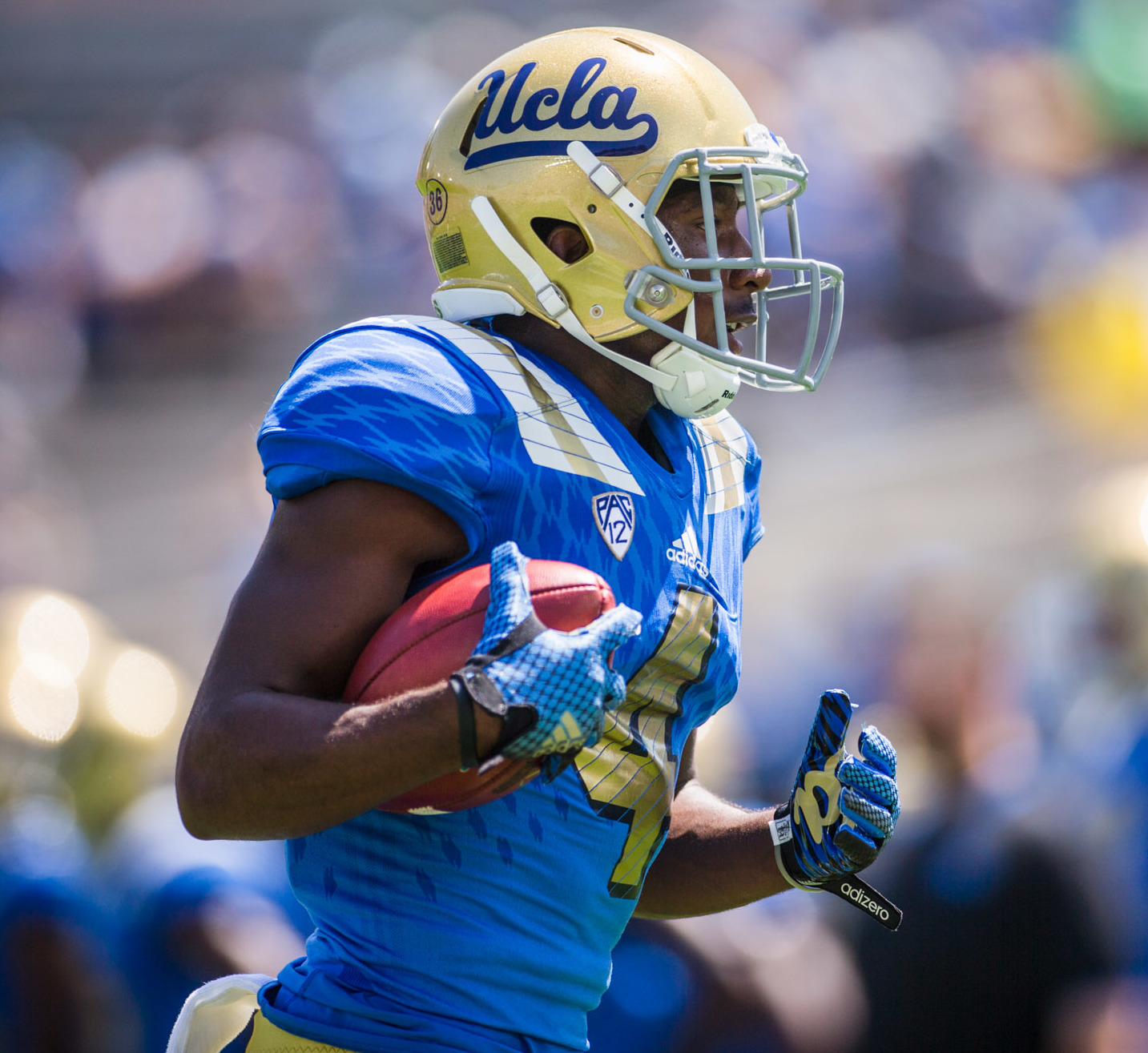
UCLA's traditional colors are "True Blue" and gold.

When football coach Red Sanders came to UCLA for the 1949 season he redesigned the football uniforms. The Yale Blue was changed to a lighter shade of blue. Sanders figured that the baby blue would look better on the field and in film. He would dub the baby blue uniform "Powderkeg blue", powder blue with an explosive kick. For the 1954 season, Sanders added the now familiar loop on the shoulders, the UCLA Stripe, to give an impression of motion. The away uniforms became white, with a navy blue and gold shoulder stripe and gold pants. The helmets became gold.

At times, beginning with the 1954 football season, the font for the numbers on the uniforms has been Clarendon typeface. Otherwise it has been block numerals. In the 1980s the uniform pants became yellow to look better in color publications, the jerseys a lighter blue, and the UCLA script was added to the helmets. In the 1990s, the uniform pants became gold again.

In 2003, the True Blue colors were adopted. The away uniforms got true blue shoulder stripes and numbers in 2006, but were replaced by navy blue again in 2010.

In 2009, the Bruins wore a 1967 throwback uniform against Washington and USC, though against USC the team's normal helmet was worn.

In 2016, UCLA announced a 15-year partnership with Under Armour. The largest Apparel deal in sports history at the time, covered all sports for UCLA and went into effect in the 2017 school year.

In 2020, Under Armour announced that they would be foregoing their partnership with UCLA, citing low return on investment. In response, UCLA sued for breach of contract.

Later in the year, UCLA announced a partnership with Nike/Jordan. The 6-year partnership commenced in 2021.

== All-time record vs. conference teams ==
Records below are updated as of October 6, 2025.

UCLA football has had periods of success in the Pac‑12 era, but against their crosstown rival USC in football the overall record favors USC. Since their first meeting in 1929, USC leads the all‑time series, with UCLA holding fewer wins and several ties. UCLA has had notable stretches of success—including an eight‑game winning run in the 1990s—but USC has won more of the matchups overall.

=== Pac-12 Conference ===
Opponent	Won	Lost	Tied	Percentage	Streak	First meeting
Arizona	27	18	2	.596	Lost 1	1927
Arizona State	23	15	1	.603	Won 1	1976
California	58	34	1	.629	Won 3	1933
Colorado	13	5	0	.722	Won 2	1980
Oregon	40	32	0	.556	Lost 4	1928
Oregon State	43	17	4	.703	Lost 1	1930
Stanford	48	43	3	.527	Won 2	1925
USC	33	52	7	.397	Lost 1	1929
Utah	12	10	0	.545	Lost 1	1933
Washington	42	32	2	.566	Won 2	1932
Washington State	42	20	1	.675	Won 1	1928
Totals	379	276	21	.576		

=== Big Ten Conference ===
The chart below shows current all time records for the Bruins against Big Ten Conference opponents.

Opponent	Won	Lost	Tied	Percentage	Streak	First meeting
Illinois	6	6	0	.500	Lost 1	1947
Indiana	0	1	0	.000	Lost 1	2024
Iowa	8	2	0	.800	Won 2	1938
Maryland	1	1	0	.500	Lost 1	1954
Michigan	3	8	0	.273	Lost 4	1956
Michigan State	3	3	0	.500	Won 3	1954
Minnesota	1	3	0	.250	Lost 1	1962
Nebraska	7	7	0	.500	Won 1	1929
Ohio State	4	3	1	.563	Won 1	1961
Penn State	5	3	0	.625	Won 1	1963
Purdue	3	0	2	.800	Won 2	1950
Rutgers	1	0	0	1.000	Won 1	2024
Wisconsin	7	4	0	.636	Lost 3	1938
Totals	47	43	3	.522		

== Bowl games ==
Through 2024, UCLA has played in 38 bowl games, compiling a 17–20–1 (.461) record.

In the early 1950s, the Pacific Coast Conference (PCC) instituted a "no-repeat" rule for the Rose Bowl after California's third consecutive loss in January 1951. UCLA was adversely affected during the undefeated 1954 season, which would have been the second of three consecutive appearances. The rule was dropped by the succeeding AAWU (Big Five) in 1959 (Washington won in 1960 and 1961), but the Big Ten kept it until the early 1970s.

The Pac-8 (and Big Ten) did not allow multiple bowl teams until the 1975 season, in which the Bruins won the Rose Bowl. In their twelve Rose Bowl appearances, UCLA has won five; the last victory was in January 1986 (third in four years), and the most recent appearance was in 1999.

== Achievements and awards ==
=== Individual award winners ===
- Heisman Trophy

Gary Beban – 1967

- Maxwell Award

Gary Beban – 1967

- Davey O'Brien Award

Troy Aikman – 1988

- John Mackey Award

Marcedes Lewis – 2005

- Lott Trophy

Anthony Barr – 2013
Eric Kendricks – 2014

- Butkus Award

Eric Kendricks – 2014

- Johnny Unitas Golden Arm Award

Cade McNown – 1998

- Outland Trophy

Jonathan Ogden – 1995
Kris Farris – 1998

- Lou Groza Award

Kai Forbath – 2009
Kaʻimi Fairbairn, 2015

- Morris Trophy

Offense:
Jonathan Ogden – 1995
Xavier Su'a-Filo – 2013
Defense:
Kenyon Coleman – 2001
Dave Ball – 2003
Coach of the Year:
Tommy Prothro - 1965
Dick Vermeil – 1975
Terry Donahue – 1985, 1993
Bob Toledo – 1998

UCLA became the first school to have a top winner in both basketball and football in the same year with Gary Beban winning the Heisman Trophy and Lew Alcindor (now Kareem Abdul-Jabbar) winning the U.S. Basketball Writers Association player of the year award in 1968.

=== College Football Hall of Famers ===
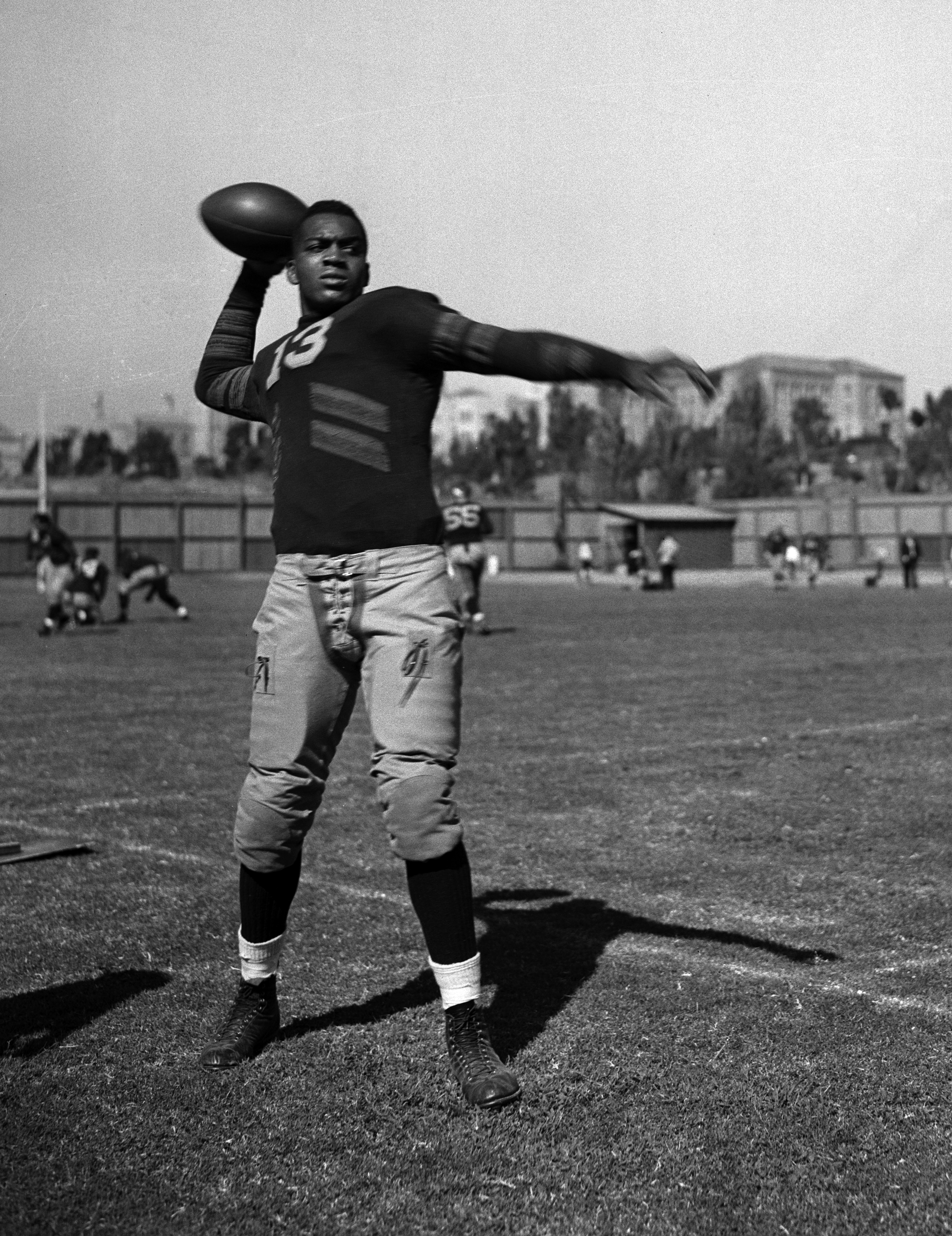
RB Kenny Washington (1937–39) was the first African-American to sign a contract with an NFL team in the post–WWII era

The following former Bruins have been inducted into the College Football Hall of Fame.

- Troy Aikman (2008)
- Gary Beban (1988)
- Sam Boghosian (2008)
- Paul Cameron (2024)
- Randy Cross (2010)
- Terry Donahue (2000)
- Kenny Easley (1991)
- Tom Fears (1976)
- Billy Kilmer (1999)
- Cade McNown (2020)
- Donn Moomaw (1973)
- Jonathan Ogden (2012)
- Tommy Prothro (1991)
- Jerry Robinson (1996)
- Red Sanders (1996)
- John Sciarra (2014)
- Al Sparlis (1983)
- Kenny Washington (1956)

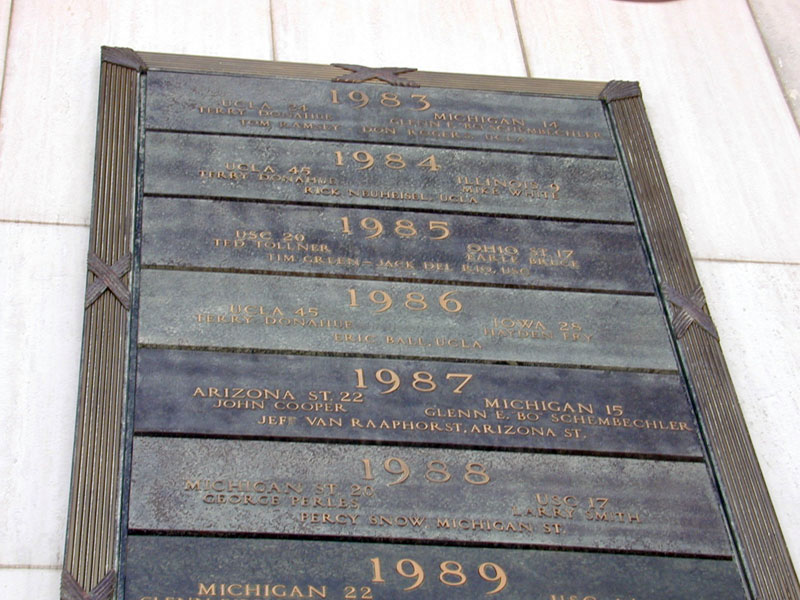
UCLA football team's Rose Bowl records

=== Rose Bowl MVPs ===
- Bob Stiles, 1966, DB
- John Sciarra, 1976, QB
- Don Rogers, 1983, FS
- Tom Ramsey, 1983, QB
- Rick Neuheisel, 1984, QB
- Eric Ball, 1986, TB

=== Rose Bowl Hall of Fame ===
- John Sciarra, 1991
- Bob Stiles, 1993
- Gary Beban, 1995
- Eric Ball, 1996
- Terry Donahue, 1997
- Rick Neuheisel, 1998
- Al Hoisch, 1999
- Tom Ramsey, 2007
- Dick Vermeil, 2014
- Cade McNown, 2017

=== Retired numbers ===
The following players have been honored with retired numbers.

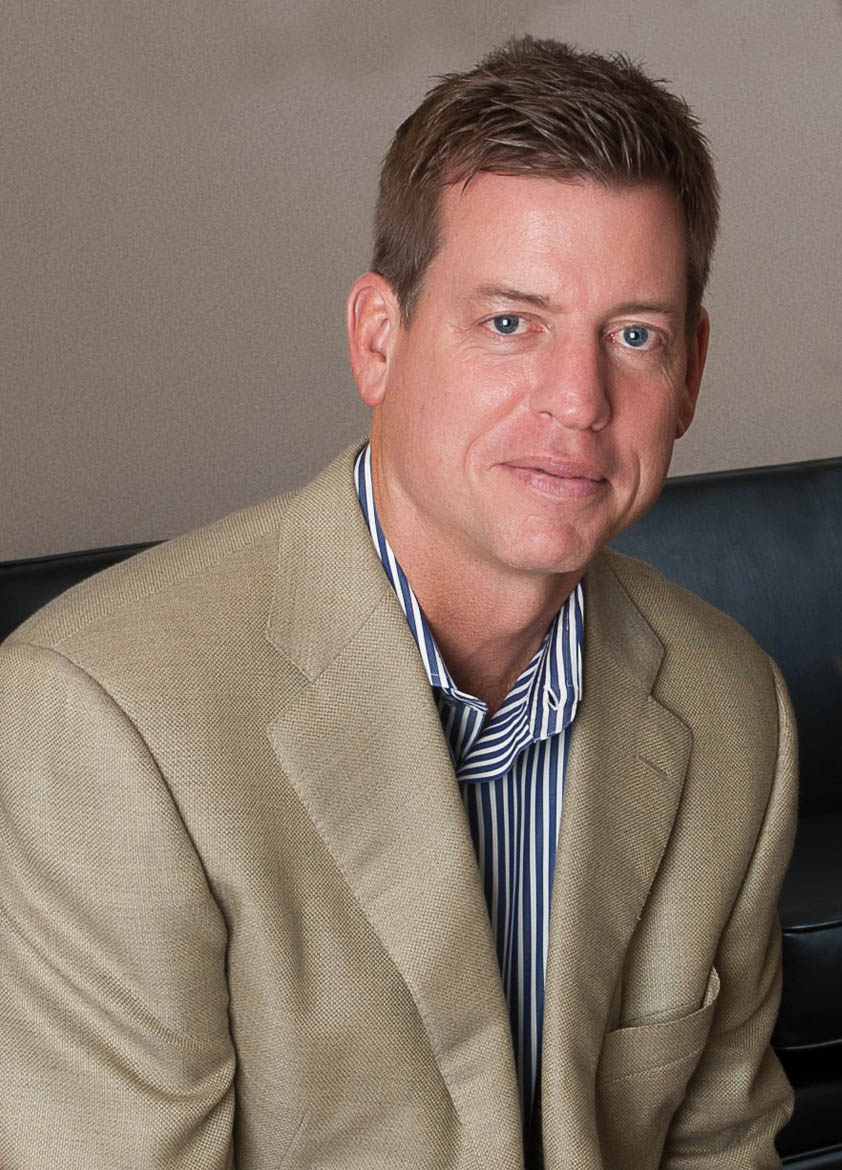
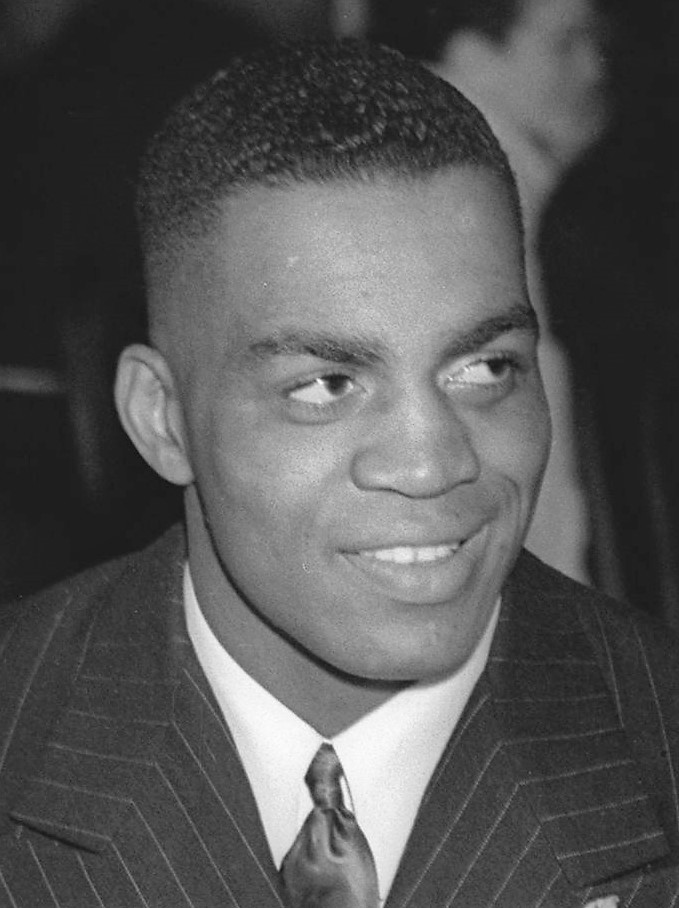
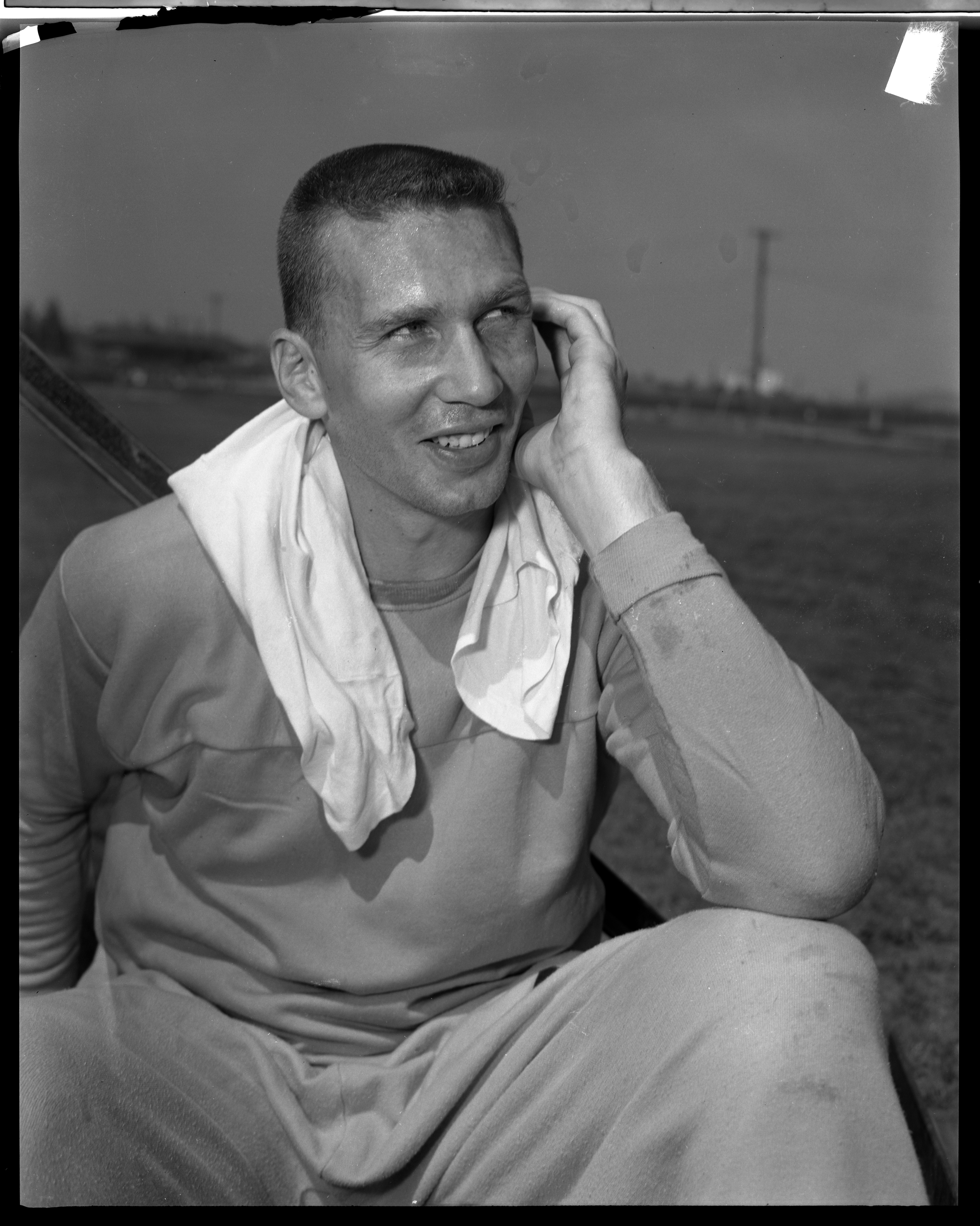
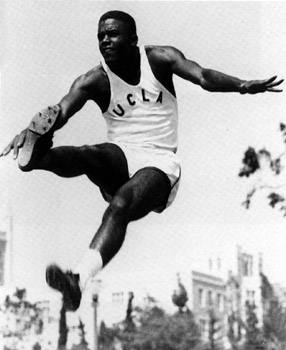
Troy Aikman, Kenny Washington, Paul Cameron, and Jackie Robinson, four of the athletes who have their numbers retired by UCLA

UCLA Bruins retired numbers
No.	Player	Tenure	Pos.	No. ret.	Ref.
5	Kenny Easley	1978–1980	S	1981	
8	Troy Aikman	1986–1988	QB	2014	
13	Kenny Washington	1937–1939	HB	1956	
16	Gary Beban	1965–1967	QB		
34	Paul Cameron	1951–1953	HB		
38	Burr Baldwin	1944–1946	E		
42	Jackie Robinson (Note: As a UCLA football player, Robinson wore No. 28; however, the school chose to retire No. 42, which became identified with him because it was the number he wore throughout his Hall of Fame baseball career with the Brooklyn Dodgers, which included his becoming the first African American player in the modern era of professional baseball.)	1939–40	S	2014 (Note: Retired across all UCLA sports on November 22, 2014. Kenny Young, a linebacker who wore No. 42 as a freshman in the 2014 season, was allowed to continue wearing the number for the remainder of his UCLA career.)	
79	Jonathan Ogden	1993–1995	OT	1997	
80	Donn Moomaw	1950–1952	C		
84	Jerry Robinson	1976–1978	LB		

== Bruins in the NFL ==
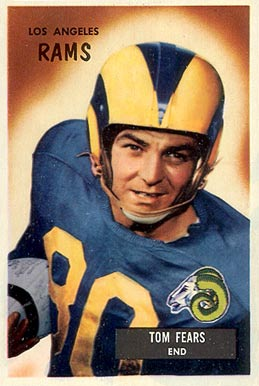
Tom Fears, Hall of Fame WR

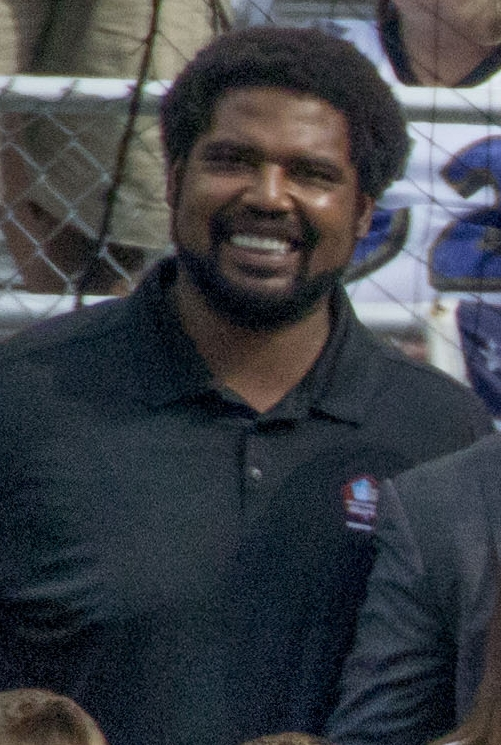
Jonathan Ogden, Hall of Fame OT

Over 300 UCLA Bruins football players have gone on to play in the National Football League (NFL). Six (6) of them have been inducted into the Pro Football Hall of Fame:

- Troy Aikman (2006)
- Kenny Easley (2017)
- Tom Fears (1970)
- Jimmy Johnson (1994)
- Jonathan Ogden (2013)
- Bob Waterfield (1965)

Twenty-three (23) former Bruins have appeared in at least 150 NFL games:

- Norm Johnson – 273 games (PK 1982–1999)
- Max Montoya – 223 games (OG 1979–1994)
- Jimmy Johnson – 213 games (DB 1961–1976)
- Roman Phifer – 212 games (LB 1991–2005)
- Marvcus Patton – 208 games (LB 1990–2002)
- Dave Dalby – 205 games (C 1972–1985)
- Donnie Edwards – 197 games (LB 1996–2008)
- Mark Tuinei – 195 games (OT 1983–1997)
- Ken Norton Jr. – 191 games (LB 1988–2000)
- Luis Sharpe – 189 games (OT 1982–1994)
- Randy Cross – 185 games (OL 1976–1988)
- Carnell Lake – 185 games (DB 1989–2001)
- Jerry Robinson – 184 games (LB 1979–1991)
- Jonathan Ogden – 177 games (OT/OG 1996–2007)
- Billy Kilmer – 170 games (QB 1961–1978)
- Marcedes Lewis – 170 games (TE 2006–present)
- Travis Kirschke – 169 games (DE 1997–2009)
- Duval Love – 167 games (OG 1985–1996)
- Fred McNeill – 167 games (LB 1974–1985)
- Mike Lodish – 166 games (DT 1990–2000)
- Troy Aikman – 165 games (QB 1989–2000)
- Bruce Davis – 160 games (OT 1979–1989)
- Don Shinnick – 159 games (LB 1957–1969)

== Media ==
UCLA football has long been carried by ABC and more recently by ESPN and Fox on television. UCLA had no discretion on these, as they were decided by the Pac-12. When UCLA joined the Big Ten in 2024, their games were carried on Fox, CBS and NBC respectfully.

KABC (790 AM) in Los Angeles is the flagship radio station for UCLA football, replacing KLAC in 2025. New York Mets announcer Josh Lewin and Matt Stevens are the current broadcast team in the booth, along with sideline reporter Wayne Cook, who is a former Bruin quarterback. Lewin replaced former announcer Bill Roth, who had taken over for Chris Roberts in 2015, after 27 years as the voice of Virginia Tech football.

Former play-by-play announcers include John Rebenstorf (1991), Paul Olden (1989–1990), Joel Meyers (1984–1988), Kent Derdivanis (1983–1985), Fred Hessler (1961–1982), and Roy Storey. Former UCLA football analysts include Billy Ray Smith (1997–2000), Steve Hartman (1996), David Norrie (1991–1995), John Rebenstorf (1990), Bob Steinbrinck (1972–1989), Bob Waterfield (1959), and Sam Balter (1950–1958).

== Future Big Ten Conference opponents ==
Announced schedules as of October 5, 2023.

Future UCLA Bruins Football Schedule
Season	Date	Opponent	Site
2026	TBD	vs Illinois	Rose Bowl • Pasadena, California
2026	TBD	vs Michigan State	Rose Bowl • Pasadena, California
2026	TBD	vs Purdue	Rose Bowl • Pasadena, California
2026	TBD	vs USC	Rose Bowl • Pasadena, California
2026	TBD	vs Wisconsin	Rose Bowl • Pasadena, California
2026	TBD	at Maryland	SECU Stadium • College Park, Maryland
2026	TBD	at Michigan	Michigan Stadium • Ann Arbor, Michigan
2026	TBD	at Minnesota	Huntington Bank Stadium • Minneapolis, Minnesota
2026	TBD	at Oregon	Autzen Stadium • Eugene, Oregon
2027	TBD	vs Michigan	Rose Bowl • Pasadena, California
2027	TBD	vs Northwestern	Rose Bowl • Pasadena, California
2027	TBD	vs Oregon	Rose Bowl • Pasadena, California
2027	TBD	vs Rutgers	Rose Bowl • Pasadena, California
2027	TBD	at Illinois	Memorial Stadium • Champaign, Illinois
2027	TBD	at Iowa	Kinnick Stadium • Iowa City, Iowa
2027	TBD	at Purdue	Ross–Ade Stadium • West Lafayette, Indiana
2027	TBD	at USC	Los Angeles Memorial Coliseum • Los Angeles, California
2027	TBD	at Wisconsin	Camp Randall Stadium • Madison, Wisconsin
2028	TBD	vs Indiana	Rose Bowl • Pasadena, California
2028	TBD	vs Maryland	Rose Bowl • Pasadena, California
2028	TBD	vs Minnesota	Rose Bowl • Pasadena, California
2028	TBD	vs Ohio State	Rose Bowl • Pasadena, California
2028	TBD	vs USC	Rose Bowl • Pasadena, California
2028	TBD	at Nebraska	Memorial Stadium • Lincoln, Nebraska
2028	TBD	at Penn State	Beaver Stadium • University Park, Pennsylvania
2028	TBD	at Rutgers	SHI Stadium • Piscataway, New Jersey
2028	TBD	at Washington	Husky Stadium • Seattle, Washington

== Future non-conference opponents ==
Announced schedules as of October 5, 2023.

Future UCLA Bruins Football Schedule
Season	Date	Opponent	Site
2026	September 5	at California (P4 - ACC)	California Memorial Stadium • Berkeley, California
2026	September 12	vs San Diego State (G6 - Pac-12)	Rose Bowl • Pasadena, California
2026	September 19	at Nevada (G6 - MW)	Rose Bowl • Pasadena, California
2027	August 28	vs UC Davis (FCS - Big Sky)	Rose Bowl • Pasadena, California
2027	September 4	vs California (P4 - ACC)	Rose Bowl • Pasadena, California
2027	September 18	at Hawaii (G6 - MW)	Clarence T.C. Ching Athletics Complex • Honolulu, Hawaii
2028	September 2	at California (P4 - ACC)	California Memorial Stadium • Berkeley, California
2028	September 9	vs Hawaii (G6 - MW)	Rose Bowl • Pasadena, California
2028	TBD	TBD	TBD • TBD
2029	September 1	vs UC Davis (FCS - Big Sky)	Rose Bowl • Pasadena, California
2029	September 15	vs California (P4 - ACC)	Rose Bowl • Pasadena, California
2029	TBD	TBD	TBD • TBD
2030	September 7	at Utah (P4 - Big 12)	Rice-Eccles Stadium • Salt Lake City, Utah
2030	TBD	TBD	TBD • TBD
2030	TBD	TBD	TBD • TBD
2031	September 6	vs UNLV (G6 - MW)	Rose Bowl • Pasadena, California
2031	September 13	at San Diego State (G6 - Pac-12)	Snapdragon Stadium • San Diego, California
2031	TBD	TBD	TBD • TBD
2032	September 4	at Fresno State (G6 - Pac-12)	Valley Children's Stadium • Fresno, California
2032	TBD	TBD	TBD • TBD
2032	TBD	TBD	TBD • TBD

- Neutral site game
- P4 School is an opponent from a Power 4 Conference.
- FBS Ind. School is a Division I FBS independent school
- G6 School is an opponent from a Group of Six Conference
- FCS School is an opponent from the Football Championship Subdivision
