= List of Southern California Intercollegiate Athletic Conference football standings =

This is a list of yearly Southern California Intercollegiate Athletic Conference football standings.

== SCIAC standings ==
1920 Southern California Conference football standings
	Conf.					Overall
Team	W		L		T	W		L		T
Pomona $	5	–	0	–	0	6	–	1	–	0
Occidental	3	–	2	–	0	4	–	3	–	0
Whittier	3	–	2	–	0	3	–	2	–	0
Caltech	2	–	2	–	1	3	–	3	–	1
Redlands	1	–	3	–	1	2	–	4	–	1
Southern Branch	0	–	5	–	0	0	–	5	–	0
$ – Conference champion

1921 Southern California Conference football standings
	Conf.					Overall
Team	W		L		T	W		L		T
Whittier $	5	–	0	–	0	5	–	2	–	0
Redlands	4	–	1	–	0	5	–	2	–	1
Occidental	2	–	2	–	1	2	–	4	–	1
Pomona	2	–	2	–	1	2	–	3	–	1
Caltech	1	–	4	–	0	2	–	5	–	1
Southern Branch	0	–	5	–	0	0	–	5	–	0
$ – Conference champion

1922 Southern California Conference football standings
	Conf.					Overall
Team	W		L		T	W		L		T
Pomona $	5	–	0	–	0	5	–	3	–	0
Occidental	4	–	1	–	0	5	–	3	–	0
Caltech	3	–	2	–	0	3	–	3	–	0
Whittier	1	–	3	–	1	3	–	3	–	1
Southern Branch	1	–	3	–	1	2	–	3	–	1
Redlands	0	–	5	–	0	2	–	5	–	0
$ – Conference champion

1923 Southern California Conference football standings
	Conf.					Overall
Team	W		L		T	W		L		T
Pomona +	4	–	1	–	0	5	–	2	–	0
Caltech +	4	–	1	–	0	5	–	4	–	0
Occidental	3	–	2	–	0	4	–	3	–	0
Whittier	2	–	3	–	0	4	–	3	–	0
Redlands	2	–	3	–	0	4	–	5	–	1
Southern Branch	0	–	5	–	0	2	–	5	–	0
+ – Conference co-champions

1924 Southern California Conference football standings
	Conf.					Overall
Team	W		L		T	W		L		T
Pomona $	5	–	0	–	0	5	–	2	–	0
Occidental	4	–	1	–	0	4	–	4	–	0
Whittier	3	–	2	–	0	4	–	3	–	0
Redlands	1	–	3	–	1	1	–	5	–	2
Caltech	1	–	4	–	0	3	–	6	–	0
Southern Branch	0	–	4	–	1	0	–	5	–	3
$ – Conference champion

1925 Southern California Conference football standings
	Conf.					Overall
Team	W		L		T	W		L		T
Occidental $	4	–	1	–	0	6	–	3	–	0
Southern Branch	3	–	1	–	1	5	–	3	–	1
Whittier	2	–	2	–	0	3	–	5	–	0
Caltech	1	–	2	–	1	2	–	6	–	1
Pomona	1	–	3	–	1	1	–	5	–	1
Redlands	1	–	3	–	1	3	–	5	–	1
$ – Conference champion

1926 Southern California Conference football standings
	Conf.					Overall
Team	W		L		T	W		L		T
Pomona $	5	–	2	–	0	5	–	2	–	0
Southern Branch	4	–	2	–	0	5	–	3	–	0
Whittier	4	–	2	–	1	4	–	4	–	1
Occidental	3	–	2	–	0	4	–	4	–	1
Caltech	3	–	2	–	0	4	–	3	–	1
La Verne	1	–	1	–	2	2	–	2	–	2
San Diego State	1	–	3	–	1	3	–	4	–	1
Redlands	0	–	7	–	0	0	–	9	–	0
$ – Conference champion

1927 Southern California Conference football standings
	Conf.					Overall
Team	W		L		T	W		L		T
Pomona $	6	–	0	–	1	6	–	0	–	1
UCLA	4	–	0	–	1	6	–	2	–	1
Whittier	4	–	2	–	1	6	–	2	–	1
Occidental	2	–	3	–	0	3	–	5	–	1
Caltech	2	–	3	–	1	2	–	5	–	1
San Diego State	2	–	3	–	0	4	–	3	–	0
Redlands	1	–	6	–	0	1	–	6	–	0
La Verne	0	–	4	–	0	3	–	4	–	0
$ – Conference champion

1928 Southern California Conference football standings
	Conf.					Overall
Team	W		L		T	W		L		T
Occidental $	5	–	1	–	0	7	–	3	–	0
Caltech	4	–	1	–	1	5	–	3	–	1
Pomona	4	–	1	–	0	4	–	3	–	0
San Diego State	2	–	3	–	0	3	–	3	–	0
Whittier	2	–	3	–	1	3	–	4	–	1
Redlands	1	–	4	–	0	3	–	5	–	0
La Verne	0	–	5	–	0	0	–	6	–	0
$ – Conference champion

1929 Southern California Conference football standings
	Conf.					Overall
Team	W		L		T	W		L		T
Occidental $	4	–	0	–	0	6	–	2	–	0
Pomona	5	–	1	–	0	6	–	2	–	0
Whittier	3	–	2	–	1	4	–	4	–	1
Redlands	2	–	2	–	1	3	–	4	–	1
Caltech	3	–	3	–	0	3	–	6	–	0
San Diego State	1	–	5	–	0	3	–	5	–	0
La Verne	0	–	5	–	0	0	–	5	–	0
$ – Conference champion

1930 Southern California Conference football standings
	Conf.					Overall
Team	W		L		T	W		L		T
Caltech $	4	–	0	–	0	5	–	3	–	1
Whittier	4	–	1	–	0	5	–	3	–	1
San Diego State	3	–	3	–	0	5	–	4	–	0
Occidental	2	–	3	–	0	4	–	4	–	0
Redlands	2	–	3	–	0	3	–	5	–	0
Pomona	2	–	3	–	0	2	–	5	–	0
La Verne	0	–	4	–	0	0	–	6	–	1
$ – Conference champion

1931 Southern California Conference football standings
	Conf.					Overall
Team	W		L		T	W		L		T
Caltech $	5	–	1	–	0	6	–	2	–	1
Whittier	4	–	1	–	0	6	–	3	–	0
Occidental	3	–	2	–	0	3	–	4	–	1
Redlands	3	–	3	–	1	4	–	3	–	1
San Diego State	2	–	2	–	1	5	–	3	–	2
Pomona	2	–	3	–	0	2	–	6	–	0
La Verne	1	–	3	–	0	4	–	3	–	1
Santa Barbara State	0	–	5	–	0	1	–	5	–	1
$ – Conference champion

1932 Southern California Conference football standings
	Conf.					Overall
Team	W		L		T	W		L		T
Whittier $	5	–	1	–	0	10	–	1	–	0
Redlands	5	–	2	–	0	7	–	2	–	0
La Verne	5	–	2	–	0	6	–	2	–	0
Occidental	4	–	2	–	1	4	–	4	–	1
Pomona	2	–	4	–	0	2	–	4	–	0
San Diego State	2	–	4	–	1	3	–	5	–	1
Caltech	2	–	5	–	0	2	–	7	–	0
Santa Barbara State	1	–	6	–	0	1	–	6	–	0
$ – Conference champion

1933 Southern California Conference football standings
	Conf.					Overall
Team	W		L		T	W		L		T
Redlands $	6	–	0	–	1	6	–	1	–	1
Whittier	4	–	1	–	2	4	–	4	–	2
La Verne	5	–	2	–	0	3	–	4	–	0
San Diego State	4	–	2	–	1	4	–	4	–	1
Pomona	2	–	5	–	0	2	–	5	–	0
Occidental	2	–	5	–	0	2	–	6	–	0
Caltech	2	–	5	–	0	2	–	7	–	0
Santa Barbara State	1	–	6	–	0	1	–	8	–	0
$ – Conference champion; Conference records include forfeits which are not reflected in overall records.

1934 Southern California Conference football standings
	Conf.					Overall
Team	W		L		T	W		L		T
Whittier $	5	–	0	–	0	7	–	2	–	1
San Diego State	2	–	1	–	1	3	–	5	–	1
Occidental	2	–	2	–	0	3	–	5	–	1
Redlands	2	–	3	–	0	3	–	4	–	1
La Verne	1	–	2	–	1	4	–	3	–	1
Santa Barbara State	0	–	4	–	0	2	–	5	–	1
$ – Conference champion

1935 Southern California Conference football standings
	Conf.					Overall
Team	W		L		T	W		L		T
Whittier $	4	–	1	–	0	5	–	5	–	0
Redlands	3	–	1	–	1	7	–	1	–	1
Santa Barbara State	2	–	2	–	1	5	–	2	–	2
San Diego State	2	–	2	–	1	3	–	4	–	1
Occidental	1	–	2	–	1	3	–	3	–	2
La Verne	0	–	4	–	0	3	–	6	–	1
$ – Conference champion

1936 Southern California Conference football standings
	Conf.					Overall
Team	W		L		T	W		L		T
San Diego State $	5	–	0	–	0	6	–	1	–	1
Santa Barbara State	4	–	1	–	0	9	–	1	–	0
Whittier	3	–	2	–	0	5	–	5	–	0
Redlands	2	–	3	–	0	2	–	6	–	0
Occidental	1	–	4	–	0	3	–	5	–	1
La Verne	0	–	5	–	0	1	–	7	–	0
$ – Conference champion

1937 Southern California Conference football standings
	Conf.					Overall
Team	W		L		T	W		L		T
San Diego State $	4	–	1	–	0	7	–	1	–	0
Santa Barbara State	3	–	1	–	1	5	–	2	–	2
Redlands	2	–	1	–	2	3	–	3	–	2
Whittier	2	–	2	–	1	2	–	6	–	2
Occidental	1	–	2	–	2	2	–	2	–	3
La Verne	0	–	5	–	0	0	–	9	–	0
$ – Conference champion

1938 Southern California Conference football standings
	Conf.					Overall
Team	W		L		T	W		L		T
Pomona $	4	–	0	–	1	6	–	0	–	1
Whittier	2	–	0	–	2	7	–	1	–	2
San Diego State	2	–	1	–	1	5	–	2	–	1
Redlands	2	–	3	–	0	3	–	5	–	0
Occidental	1	–	4	–	0	3	–	5	–	0
Caltech	0	–	3	–	0	1	–	7	–	0
$ – Conference champion
