= 1926 San Diego State Aztecs football team =

American college football season

1926 San Diego State Aztecs football
- Conference: Southern California Conference
- Record: 3–4–1 (1–3–1 SCC)
- Head coach: Charles E. Peterson (6th season)
- Home stadium: Navy "Sports" Field

1926 Southern California Conference football standings
	Conf.					Overall
Team	W		L		T	W		L		T
Pomona $	5	–	2	–	0	5	–	2	–	0
Southern Branch	4	–	2	–	0	5	–	3	–	0
Whittier	4	–	2	–	1	4	–	4	–	1
Occidental	3	–	2	–	0	4	–	4	–	1
Caltech	3	–	2	–	0	4	–	3	–	1
La Verne	1	–	1	–	2	2	–	2	–	2
San Diego State	1	–	3	–	1	3	–	4	–	1
Redlands	0	–	7	–	0	0	–	9	–	0
$ – Conference champion

The 1926 San Diego State Aztecs football team represented San Diego State Teachers College (Note: San Diego State University was known as San Diego State Teachers College from 1924 to 1934.) during the 1926 college football season. San Diego State competed as a member of the Southern California Intercollegiate Athletic Conference (SCIAC) in 1926. They had played as an Independent the previous year.

The 1926 San Diego State team was led by head coach Charles E. Peterson in his sixth season as football coach of the Aztecs. (Note: San Diego State's Peterson Gym, which opened in 1961, was named after coach Peterson. At various times during his 37-year career with the Aztecs, Peterson was the athletic director, football coach, basketball coach, track coach, and Dean of Men.) They played home games at Navy "Sports" Field. (Note: Navy "Sports" Field was the original name of what became Lane Field in downtown San Diego. It was converted to a baseball-only configuration in 1936.) The Aztecs finished the season with three wins, four losses and one tie (3–4–1, 1–3–1 SCIAC). Overall, the team was outscored by its opponents 78–150 points for the season.

== Schedule ==
Date	Opponent	Site	Result	Attendance	Source
October 2	at Pomona	Claremont Alumni Field; Claremont, CA	L 6–20		
October 9	at Southern Branch	Moore Field; Los Angeles, CA	L 7–42		
October 16	Redlands	Navy "Sports" Field; San Diego, CA	W 14–9	2,000	
October 23	at California Christian*	Moore Field; Los Angeles, CA	W 21–16		
October 30	Fresno State*	Navy "Sports" Field; San Diego, CA (rivalry)	L 7–28		
November 6	Santa Barbara State*	Navy "Sports" Field; San Diego, CA	W 16–0	3,500	
November 13	La Verne	Navy "Sports" Field; San Diego, CA	T 7–7		
November 25	Whittier	Navy "Sports" Field; San Diego, CA	L 0–28	5,000	
*Non-conference game
