= 1928 San Diego State Aztecs football team =

American college football season

1928 San Diego State Aztecs football
- Conference: Southern California Conference
- Record: 3–3 (2–3 SCC)
- Head coach: Charles E. Peterson (8th season)
- Home stadium: Balboa Stadium; College Field

1928 Southern California Conference football standings
	Conf.					Overall
Team	W		L		T	W		L		T
Occidental $	5	–	1	–	0	7	–	3	–	0
Caltech	4	–	1	–	1	5	–	3	–	1
Pomona	4	–	1	–	0	4	–	3	–	0
San Diego State	2	–	3	–	0	3	–	3	–	0
Whittier	2	–	3	–	1	3	–	4	–	1
Redlands	1	–	4	–	0	3	–	5	–	0
La Verne	0	–	5	–	0	0	–	6	–	0
$ – Conference champion

The 1928 San Diego State Aztecs football team represented San Diego State Teachers College (Note: San Diego State University was known as San Diego State Teachers College from 1924 to 1934.) during the 1928 college football season.

San Diego State competed in the Southern California Intercollegiate Athletic Conference (SCIAC). The 1928 San Diego State team was led by head coach Charles E. Peterson in his eighth season as football coach of the Aztecs. (Note: San Diego State's Peterson Gym, which opened in 1961, was named after coach Peterson. At various times during his 37-year career with the Aztecs, Peterson was the athletic director, football coach, basketball coach, track coach, and Dean of Men.) They played three home games at Balboa Stadium and one at a field on the school campus. The Aztecs finished the season with three wins and three losses (3–3, 2–3 SCIAC). Overall, the team outscored its opponents 111–105 points for the season.

== Schedule ==
Date	Opponent	Site	Result	Attendance	Source
October 13	Occidental	Balboa Stadium; San Diego, CA	L 7–20	7,000	
October 27	Whittier	Balboa Stadium; San Diego, CA	W 34–12	7,500	
November 3	at California Christian*	Moore Field; Los Angeles, CA	W 18–13		
November 10	La Verne	College Field; San Diego, CA	W 40–0		
November 17	at Pomona	Claremont Alumni Field; Claremont, CA	L 0–27		
November 29	Caltech	Balboa Stadium; San Diego, CA	L 12–33		
*Non-conference game
