= 1927 San Diego State Aztecs football team =

American college football season

1927 San Diego State Aztecs football
- Conference: Southern California Conference
- Record: 4–3 (2–3 SCC)
- Head coach: Charles E. Peterson (7th season)
- Home stadium: Balboa Stadium; College Field

1927 Southern California Conference football standings
	Conf.					Overall
Team	W		L		T	W		L		T
Pomona $	6	–	0	–	1	6	–	0	–	1
UCLA	4	–	0	–	1	6	–	2	–	1
Whittier	4	–	2	–	1	6	–	2	–	1
Occidental	2	–	3	–	0	3	–	5	–	1
Caltech	2	–	3	–	1	2	–	5	–	1
San Diego State	2	–	3	–	0	4	–	3	–	0
Redlands	1	–	6	–	0	1	–	6	–	0
La Verne	0	–	4	–	0	3	–	4	–	0
$ – Conference champion

The 1927 San Diego State Aztecs football team represented San Diego State Teachers College (Note: San Diego State University was known as San Diego State Teachers College from 1924 to 1934.) during the 1927 college football season.

San Diego State competed in the Southern California Intercollegiate Athletic Conference (SCIAC). The 1927 San Diego State team was led by head coach Charles E. Peterson in his seventh season as football coach of the Aztecs. (Note: San Diego State's Peterson Gym, which opened in 1961, was named after coach Peterson. At various times during his 37-year career with the Aztecs, Peterson was the athletic director, football coach, basketball coach, track coach, and Dean of Men.) They played three home games at Balboa Stadium and one at a field on the school campus. The Aztecs finished the season with four wins and three losses (4–3, 2–3 SCIAC). Overall, the team outscored its opponents 190–79 points for the season.

== Schedule ==
Date	Opponent	Site	Result	Attendance	Source
October 1	California Christian*	Balboa Stadium; San Diego, CA	W 71–0		
October 8	at Redlands	Redlands Stadium (Note: This stadium is the predecessor to the current Ted Runner Stadium on the University of Redlands campus, which was opened for the 1968 season); Redlands, CA	W 32–0		
October 15	Caltech	College Field; San Diego, CA	L 13–17		
October 29	Pomona	Balboa Stadium; San Diego, CA	L 12–18	8,000	
November 5	at Whittier	Hadley Field; Whittier, CA	L 7–25		
November 12	at Santa Barbara State*	Peabody Stadium; Santa Barbara, CA	W 16–13		
November 24	La Verne	Balboa Stadium; San Diego, CA	W 39–6		
*Non-conference game
