= 1929 San Diego State Aztecs football team =

American college football season

1929 San Diego State Aztecs football
- Conference: Southern California Conference
- Record: 3–5 (1–5 SCC)
- Head coach: Charles E. Peterson (9th season)
- Home stadium: Balboa Stadium; Navy "Sports"Field

1929 Southern California Conference football standings
	Conf.					Overall
Team	W		L		T	W		L		T
Occidental $	4	–	0	–	0	6	–	2	–	0
Pomona	5	–	1	–	0	6	–	2	–	0
Whittier	3	–	2	–	1	4	–	4	–	1
Redlands	2	–	2	–	1	3	–	4	–	1
Caltech	3	–	3	–	0	3	–	6	–	0
San Diego State	1	–	5	–	0	3	–	5	–	0
La Verne	0	–	5	–	0	0	–	5	–	0
$ – Conference champion

The 1929 San Diego State Aztecs football team represented San Diego State Teachers College (Note: San Diego State University was known as San Diego State Teachers College from 1924 to 1934.) during the 1929 college football season.

San Diego State competed in the Southern California Intercollegiate Athletic Conference (SCIAC). The 1929 San Diego State team was led by head coach Charles E. Peterson in his ninth season as football coach of the Aztecs. (Note: San Diego State's Peterson Gym, which opened in 1961, was named after coach Peterson. At various times during his 37-year career with the Aztecs, Peterson was the athletic director, football coach, basketball coach, track coach, and Dean of Men.) They played five home games at Balboa Stadium and one at Navy "Sports" Field. (Note: Navy "Sports" Field was the original name of what became Lane Field in downtown San Diego. It was converted to a baseball-only configuration in 1936.) The Aztecs finished the season with three wins and five losses (3–5, 1–5 SCIAC). Overall, the team was outscored by its opponents 81–96 points for the season.

== Schedule ==
Date	Opponent	Site	Result	Attendance
September 28	California Christian*	Balboa Stadium; San Diego, CA	W 26–18	
October 5	at Whittier	Hadley Field; Whittier, CA	L 7–13	
October 12	at Redlands	Redlands Stadium (Note: This stadium is the predecessor to the current Ted Runner Stadium on the University of Redlands campus, which was opened for the 1968 season); Redlands, CA	L 0–7	
October 19	Santa Barbara State	Balboa Stadium; San Diego, CA	W 7–6	
November 2	Occidental	Balboa Stadium; San Diego, CA	L 0–20	
November 9	La Verne	Navy "Sports" Field; San Diego, CA	W 35–0	
November 16	Pomona	Balboa Stadium; San Diego, CA	L 0–13	
November 28	Caltech*	Balboa Stadium; San Diego, CA	L 6–19	
*Non-conference game
