= List of San Diego State Aztecs football seasons =

This is a list of seasons completed by the San Diego State Aztecs football team of the National Collegiate Athletic Association (NCAA) Division I Football Bowl Subdivision (FBS). The team began competition in 1921.

San Diego State has been a member of a conference for all but a few seasons since it started play

- Southern California Junior College Conference (1921–1924)
- Southern California Intercollegiate Athletic Conference (1926–1938)
- California Collegiate Athletic Association (1939–1967); charter member
- Pacific Coast Athletic Association (1969–1975); charter member
- Western Athletic Conference (1978–1998)
- Mountain West Conference (1999–present)
- Pac-12 Conference (joining in 2026)

When the NCAA first started classification in 1937, San Diego State was part of the NCAA College Division (Small College). While playing in the College Division under College Hall of Fame coach Don Coryell, they were voted the football National Champion for three consecutive years, 1966–1968. They moved to the NCAA University Division (Major College) in 1969.

== Seasons ==
Year	Coach	Overall	Conference	Standing	Bowl/playoffs	Coaches^{#}	AP^{°}
Southern California Junior College Conference (1921–1924)
C.E. Peterson (Southern California Junior College Conference) (1921–1924)
1921	Peterson	4–6	1–3	4th			
1922	Peterson	6–4	4–0	1st			
1923	Peterson	8–2	2–0	1st			
1924	Peterson	7–1–2	3–0	1st			
C.E. Peterson (Independent) (1925)
1925	Peterson	5–3–1					
Southern California Intercollegiate Athletic Conference (1926–1938)
C.E. Peterson (Southern California Intercollegiate Athletic Conference) (1926–1929)
1926	Peterson	3–4–1	1–3–1	7th			
1927	Peterson	4–3	2–3	T–5th			
1928	Peterson	3–3	2–3	5th			
1929	Peterson	3–5	1–5	6th			
Peterson:		43–31–4 (.577)	16–17–1 (.485)				
W.B. Herreid (Southern California Intercollegiate Athletic Conference) (1930–1934)
1930	Herreid	5–4	3–3	3rd			
1931	Herreid	5–3–2	2–2–1	T-4th			
1932	Herreid	3–5–1	2–4–1	5th			
1933	Herreid	4–4–1	4–2–1	4th			
1934	Herreid	3–5–1	2–1–1	2nd			
Herreid:		20–21–5 (.489)	13–12–4 (.517)				
Leo Calland (Southern California Intercollegiate Athletic Conference) (1935–1938)
1935	Calland	3–4–1	2–2–1	T–3rd			
1936	Calland	6–1–1	5–0	1st			
1937	Calland	7–1	4–1	1st			
1938	Calland	5–2–1	3–2–1	3rd			
California Collegiate Athletic Association (1939–1967)
Leo Calland (California Collegiate Athletic Association) (1939–1941)
1939	Calland	2–7	0–2	4th			
1940	Calland	5–3–1	1–1–1	T-2nd			
1941	Calland	6–4	0–3	4th			
Calland:		34–22–4 (.600)	15–11–3 (.569)				
John Eubank (Independent) (1942)
1942	Eubank	0–6–1					
Eubank:		0–6–1 (.071)					
No team (World War II) (1943–1944)
Bob Breitbard (Independent) (1945)
1945	Breitbard	2–5					
Breitbard:		2–5 (.286)					
Bill Terry (California Collegiate Athletic Association) (1946)
1946	Terry	6–4	2–2	T–2nd			
Terry:		6–4 (.600)	2–2 (.500)				
Bill Shulte (California Collegiate Athletic Association) (1947–1955)
1947	Shulte	7–3–1	2–2–1	4th	L Harbor		
1948	Shulte	4–7	1–4	T-5th			
1949	Shulte	6–3	3–1	2nd			
1950	Shulte	5–3–1	3–0–1	1st			
1951	Shulte	10–0–1	4–0	1st	W Pineapple		
1952	Shulte	4–5	2–2	3rd			
1953	Shulte	5–3–1	3–1–1	2nd			
1954	Shulte	5–4	2–2	2nd			
1955	Shulte	2–8	0–2	3rd			
Shulte:		48–36–4 (.568)	20–14–3 (.581)				
Paul Governali (California Collegiate Athletic Association) (1956–1960)
1956	Governali	4–3–2	2–1	T–2nd			
1957	Governali	2–7	0–2	5th			
1958	Governali	3–5	2–3	4th			
1959	Governali	1–6–1	0–5	6th			
1960	Governali	1–6–1	0–5	6th			
Governali:		11–27–4 (.310)	4–16 (.200)				
Don Coryell (California Collegiate Athletic Association) (1961–1967)
1961	Coryell	7–2–1	2–2–1	4th			
1962	Coryell	8–2	5–0	1st			
1963	Coryell	7–2	3–1	2nd			
1964	Coryell	8–2	4–1	2nd			
1965	Coryell	8–2	3–2	3rd			
1966	Coryell	11–0	5–0	1st	W Camellia	1	1
1967	Coryell	10–1	5–0	1st	W Camellia	1	1
Don Coryell (Independent) (1968)
1968	Coryell	9–0–1				1	2
Pacific Coast Athletic Association (1969–1975)
Don Coryell (Pacific Coast Athletic Association) (1969–1972)
1969	Coryell	11–0	6–0	1st	W Pasadena		
1970	Coryell	9–2	5–1	1st			
1971	Coryell	6–5	2–3	T–4th			
1972	Coryell	10–1	4–0	1st			
Coryell:		104–19–2 (.840)	44–10–1 (.809)				
Claude Gilbert (Pacific Coast Athletic Association) (1973–1975)
1973	Gilbert	9–1–1	3–0–1	1st			
1974	Gilbert	8–2–1	4–0	1st			
1975	Gilbert	8–3	3–2	3rd			
Independent (1976–1977)
Claude Gilbert (Independent) (1976–1977)
1976	Gilbert	10–1					
1977	Gilbert	10–1				18	16
Western Athletic Conference (1978–1998)
Claude Gilbert (Western Athletic Conference) (1978–1980)
1978	Gilbert	4–7	2–4	6th			
1979	Gilbert	8–3	4–2	T–2nd			
1980	Gilbert	4–8	4–4	4th			
Gilbert:		61–26–2 (.697)	20–12–1 (.621)				
Doug Scovil (Western Athletic Conference) (1981–1985)
1981	Scovil	6–5	3–5	6th			
1982	Scovil	7–5	4–3	T–3rd			
1983	Scovil	3–8–1	1–6–1	8th			
1984	Scovil	4–7–1	4–3–1	T–4th			
1985	Scovil	5–6–1	3–4–1	6th			
Scovil:		24–32–3 (.432)	15–21–3 (.423)				
Denny Stolz (Western Athletic Conference) (1986–1988)
1986	Stolz	8–4	7–1	1st	L Holiday	25	
1987	Stolz	5–7	4–4	5th			
1988	Stolz	3–8	3–5	T–6th			
Stolz:		16–19 (.457)	14–10 (.583)				
Al Luginbill (Western Athletic Conference) (1989–1993)
1989	Luginbill	6–5–1	4–3	T–5th			
1990	Luginbill	6–5	5–2	3rd			
1991	Luginbill	8–4–1	6–1–1	2nd	L Freedom		
1992	Luginbill	5–5–1	5–3	4th			
1993	Luginbill	6–6	4–4	T–6th			
Luginbill:		31–25–3 (.551)	24–13–1 (.645)				
Ted Tollner (Western Athletic Conference) (1994–1998)
1994	Tollner	4–7	2–6	8th			
1995	Tollner	8–4	5–3	5th			
1996	Tollner	8–3	6–2	T–2nd Pacific			
1997	Tollner	5–7	4–4	T–4th Pacific			
1998	Tollner	7–5	7–1	T–1st Pacific	L Las Vegas		
Mountain West Conference (1999–present)
Ted Tollner (Mountain West Conference) (1999–2001)
1999	Tollner	5–6	3–4	T–5th			
2000	Tollner	3–8	3–4	T–5th			
2001	Tollner	3–8	2–5	7th			
Tollner:		43–48 (.473)	32–29 (.525)				
Tom Craft (Mountain West Conference) (2002–2005)
2002	Craft	4–9	4–3	T–3rd			
2003	Craft	6–6	3–4	T–4th			
2004	Craft	4–7	2–5	7th			
2005	Craft	5–7	4–4	T–4th			
Craft:		19–29 (.396)	13–16 (.448)				
Chuck Long (Mountain West Conference) (2006–2008)
2006	C. Long	3–9	3–5	T–6th			
2007	C. Long	4–8	3–5	6th			
2008	C. Long	2–10	1–7	T–8th			
C. Long:		9–27 (.250)	7–17 (.292)				
Brady Hoke (Mountain West Conference) (2009–2010)
2009	Hoke	4–8	2–6	7th			
2010	Hoke	9–4	5–3	T–3rd	W Poinsettia		
Hoke 1st tenure:		13–12 (.520)	7–9 (.438)				
Rocky Long (Mountain West Conference) (2011–2019)
2011	R. Long	8–5	4–3	4th	L New Orleans		
2012	R. Long	9–4	7–1	T–1st	L Poinsettia		
2013	R. Long	8–5	6–2	2nd (West)	W Famous Idaho Potato		
2014	R. Long	7–6	5–3	T–1st (West)	L Poinsettia		
2015	R. Long	11–3	8–0	1st (West)	W Hawaii		
2016	R. Long	11–3	6–2	1st (West)	W Las Vegas	25	25
2017	R. Long	10–3	6–2	2nd (West)	L Armed Forces		
2018	R. Long	7–6	4–4	4th (West)	L Frisco		
2019	R. Long	10–3	5–3	T–1st (West)	W New Mexico		
R. Long:		81–38 (.681)	51–20 (.718)				
Brady Hoke (Mountain West Conference) (2020–2023)
2020	Hoke	4–4	4–2	4th			
2021	Hoke	12–2	7–1	1st (West)	W Frisco		25
2022	Hoke	7–6	5–3	T–2nd (West)	L Hawaii		
2023	Hoke	4–8	2–6	T–2nd (West)			
Hoke 2nd tenure:		27–20 (.574)	18–12 (.600)				
Hoke:		40–32 (.556)	25–21 (.543)				
Sean Lewis (Mountain West Conference) (2024–present)
2024	Lewis	3–9	2–5	T–10th			
Lewis:		3–9 (.250)	2–5 (.286)				
Total:		608–468–32 (.563)					
National championship Conference title Conference division title or championship game berth
^{†}Indicates Bowl Coalition, Bowl Alliance, BCS, or CFP / New Years' Six bowl.; ^{#}Rankings from final Coaches Poll.; ^{°}Rankings from final AP Poll.
