= 1921 San Diego State Professors football team =

American college football season

1921 San Diego State football
- Conference: Southern California Junior College Conference
- Record: 4–6 (1–3 SCJCC)
- Head coach: Charles E. Peterson (1st season)
- Home stadium: Balboa Stadium; College Field

The 1921 San Diego State football team represented San Diego State Teachers College (Note: San Diego State University was known as San Diego State Teachers College from 1924 to 1934. It had been called San Diego Normal School from its founding in 1897 through 1920.) during the 1921 college football season. The team did not have a formal nickname in 1921. The "Professors" name was sometimes used, but local newspapers simply referred to the team either as "State" or the "Junior College".

1921 not only saw the first season of intercollegiate football for San Diego State, but it was also the first year San Diego State was a four-year institution. San Diego State competed in the Southern California Junior College Conference (SCJCC) from 1921 to 1924. The team was led by head coach Charles E. Peterson, and played home games at Balboa Stadium and at the College Field on campus. (Note: San Diego State's Peterson Gym, which opened in 1961, was named after Peterson. At various times during his 37-year career with the Aztecs, Peterson was the athletic director, football coach, basketball coach, track coach, and Dean of Men.) They finished the season with four wins and six losses (4–6, 1–3 SCJCC). The team scored 60 points in their ten games while giving up 100.

== Schedule ==
Date	Opponent	Site	Result	Source
October 1	Army-Navy Academy*	Academy Field; Pacific Beach, CA	W 6–0	
October 6	Reserve Destroyers*	College Field; San Diego, CA	L 0–3	
October 13	USS Birmingham*	College Field; San Diego, CA	L 0–14	
October 15	North Island NAS (Note: Naval Air Station North Island is a Naval air station located in San Diego that has been in use since 1917.)*	Navy "Sports" Field (Note: The Navy "Sports" Field was the original name of what became Lane Field in downtown San Diego. It was converted to a baseball-only configuration in 1936.); San Diego, CA	L 7–12	
October 19	USS Birmingham*	College Field; San Diego, CA	W 14–6	
October 21	Army-Navy Academy*	College Field; San Diego, CA	W 12–0	
October 28	at Santa Ana	Santa Ana High School Field; Santa Ana, CA	L 0–26	
November 4	Fullerton	Balboa Stadium; San Diego, CA	L 0–20	
November 11	Chaffey	Balboa Stadium; San Diego, CA	W 14–0	
November 19	at Riverside	Riverside Polytechnic High School; Riverside, CA	L 7–19	
*Non-conference game
