= 1933 San Diego State Aztecs football team =

American college football season

1933 San Diego State Aztecs football
- Conference: Southern California Conference
- Record: 4–4–1 (4–2–1 SCC)
- Head coach: Walter Herreid (4th season)
- Home stadium: Navy "Sports" Field

1933 Southern California Conference football standings
	Conf.					Overall
Team	W		L		T	W		L		T
Redlands $	6	–	0	–	1	6	–	1	–	1
Whittier	4	–	1	–	2	4	–	4	–	2
La Verne	5	–	2	–	0	3	–	4	–	0
San Diego State	4	–	2	–	1	4	–	4	–	1
Pomona	2	–	5	–	0	2	–	5	–	0
Occidental	2	–	5	–	0	2	–	6	–	0
Caltech	2	–	5	–	0	2	–	7	–	0
Santa Barbara State	1	–	6	–	0	1	–	8	–	0
$ – Conference champion; Conference records include forfeits which are not reflected in overall records.

The 1933 San Diego State Aztecs football team represented San Diego State Teachers College (Note: San Diego State University was known as San Diego State Teachers College from 1924 to 1934.) during the 1933 college football season.

San Diego State competed in the Southern California Intercollegiate Athletic Conference (SCIAC). The 1933 San Diego State team was led by head coach Walter Herreid in his fourth season with the Aztecs. They played home games at Navy "Sports" Field. (Note: Navy "Sports" Field was the original name of what became Lane Field in downtown San Diego. It was converted to a baseball-only configuration in 1936.) The Aztecs finished the season with four wins, four losses and one tie (4–4–1, 2–2–1 SCIAC). Overall, the team was outscored by its opponents 59–72 points for the season. This low scoring season included five shut outs of their opponents and being shut out five times.

== Schedule ==
Date	Opponent	Site	Result	Attendance	Source
September 23	at UCLA*	Spaulding Field; Westwood, CA	L 0–13	4,000	
September 30	San Diego Marines (Note: The Marine Corps Recruit Depot (MCRD) in San Diego fielded a team that played against colleges and other military teams from 1922 to 1964.)*	Navy "Sports" Field; San Diego, CA	L 0–34	4,000	
October 6	at Whittier	Hadley Field; Whittier, CA	T 0–0	5,000	
October 14	Pomona	San Diego, CA	W 10–0	3,500	
October 20	at La Verne	Arnett Field; La Verne, CA	W 6–0		
October 27	Redlands	Navy "Sports" Field; San Diego, CA	L 0–13		
November 10	at Santa Barbara State	Peabody Stadium; Santa Barbara, CA	W 6–0		
November 18	at Occidental	D.W. Patterson Field; Los Angeles, CA	L 0–12		
November 25	Caltech	Navy "Sports" Field; San Diego, CA	W 37–0	1,000	
*Non-conference game
