= 1930 San Diego State Aztecs football team =

American college football season

1930 San Diego State Aztecs football
- Conference: Southern California Conference
- Record: 5–4 (3–3 SCC)
- Head coach: Walter Herreid (1st season)
- Home stadium: Navy "Sports" Field

1930 Southern California Conference football standings
	Conf.					Overall
Team	W		L		T	W		L		T
Caltech $	4	–	0	–	0	5	–	3	–	1
Whittier	4	–	1	–	0	5	–	3	–	1
San Diego State	3	–	3	–	0	5	–	4	–	0
Occidental	2	–	3	–	0	4	–	4	–	0
Redlands	2	–	3	–	0	3	–	5	–	0
Pomona	2	–	3	–	0	2	–	5	–	0
La Verne	0	–	4	–	0	0	–	6	–	1
$ – Conference champion

The 1930 San Diego State Aztecs football team represented San Diego State Teachers College (Note: San Diego State University was known as San Diego State Teachers College from 1924 to 1934.) during the 1930 college football season.

San Diego State competed in the Southern California Intercollegiate Athletic Conference (SCIAC). The 1930 San Diego State team was led by head coach Walter Herreid in his first season with the Aztecs. They played home games at Navy "Sports" Field. (Note: Navy "Sports" Field was the original name of what became Lane Field in downtown San Diego. It was converted to a baseball-only configuration in 1936.) The Aztecs finished the season with five wins and four losses (5–4, 3-3 SCIAC). Overall, the team outscored its opponents 112–71 points for the season. This included shutting out their opponents three times and being shut out two times.

== Schedule ==
Date	Opponent	Site	Result	Attendance	Source
September 25	San Diego Marines JV (Note: The Marine Corps Recruit Depot (MCRD) in San Diego fielded a team that played against colleges and other military teams from 1922 to 1964.)*	Navy "Sports" Field; San Diego, CA	W 39–0 (Note: The game between the Aztecs and San Diego Marines JV was the first night football game played in San Diego.)	4,000	
October 3	at Pomona	Claremont Alumni Field; Claremont, CA	W 6–0		
October 11	California Christian*	Navy "Sports" Field; San Diego, CA	W 19–0		
October 17	at Occidental	Rose Bowl; Pasadena, CA	W 14–7		
October 25	La Verne	Navy "Sports" Field; San Diego, CA	W 14–6		
November 1	Whittier	Navy "Sports" Field; San Diego, CA	L 13–19	4,000	
November 8	Redlands	Navy "Sports" Field; San Diego, CA	L 0–6		
November 15	Submarines Pacific (CA)*	Navy "Sports" Field; San Diego, CA	L 7–13		
November 27	Caltech	Navy "Sports" Field; San Diego, CA	L 0–20		
*Non-conference game
