= 1927 UCLA Grizzlies football team =

American college football season

1927 UCLA Grizzlies football
- Conference: Southern California Conference
- Record: 6–2–1 (4–0–1 SCC)
- Head coach: William H. Spaulding (3rd season)
- Home stadium: Moore Field; Los Angeles Memorial Coliseum

1927 Southern California Conference football standings
	Conf.					Overall
Team	W		L		T	W		L		T
Pomona $	6	–	0	–	1	6	–	0	–	1
UCLA	4	–	0	–	1	6	–	2	–	1
Whittier	4	–	2	–	1	6	–	2	–	1
Occidental	2	–	3	–	0	3	–	5	–	1
Caltech	2	–	3	–	1	2	–	5	–	1
San Diego State	2	–	3	–	0	4	–	3	–	0
Redlands	1	–	6	–	0	1	–	6	–	0
La Verne	0	–	4	–	0	3	–	4	–	0
$ – Conference champion

The 1927 UCLA Grizzlies football team was an American football team that represented the University of California, Los Angeles during the 1927 college football season. The program, which was later known as the Bruins, was in their third year under head coach William H. Spaulding. The Grizzlies compiled a 6–2–1 record and outscored their opponents by a combined total of 144 to 54.

== Schedule ==
Date	Opponent	Site	Result	Attendance	Source
September 24	Santa Barbara State*	Moore Field; Los Angeles, CA	W 33–0		
October 1	Fresno State*	Moore Field; Los Angeles, CA	W 7–0		
October 8	Whittier	Moore Field; Los Angeles, CA	W 25–6		
October 15	Occidental	Los Angeles Memorial Coliseum; Los Angeles, CA	W 8–0		
October 28	Redlands	Moore Field; Los Angeles, CA	W 32–0		
November 5	Pomona	Los Angeles Memorial Coliseum; Los Angeles, CA	T 7–7		
November 12	at Caltech	Tournament Park; Pasadena, CA	W 13–0		
November 19	at Arizona*	University of Arizona Field; Tucson, AZ	L 13–16		
November 26	Drake*	Los Angeles Memorial Coliseum; Los Angeles, CA	L 6–25	10,000	
*Non-conference game
