= 1919 All-Pacific Coast football team =

American all-star college football team

The 1919 All-Pacific Coast football team consists of American football players chosen by various organizations for All-Pacific Coast teams for the 1919 college football season.

== All-Pacific Coast selections ==
=== Quarterback ===
- Bill Steers, Oregon (PS-1; GB-1; AS-1; HH-1; SH-1)
- Dick Hanley, Washington State (AS-2; HH-2)

=== Halfbacks ===
- Lloyd Gillis, Washington State (PS-1; GB-1; AS-2; HH-2; SH-1)
- Carlton G. Wells, California (PS-1; GB-1; AS-1; HH-1)
- Holt, Stanford (AS-1)
- Charles A. Huntington, Oregon (AS-1)
- Karl Deeds, California (AS-2)
- Ervin Dailey, Washington (HH-2)
- Fred T. Brooks, California (HH-2)

=== Fullback ===
- George Powell, Oregon Agricultural (GB-1; AS-2; HH-1; SH-1)
- Dink Templeton, Stanford (PS-1; HH-1)
- Hollis Huntington, Oregon (SH-1)

=== Ends ===
- Ted Faulk, Washington (PS-1; GB-1; AS-1; HH-2; SH-1)
- Hubbard, Oregon Agricultural (PS-1; GB-1; HH-1)
- Roy Hanley, Washington State (AS-1; HH-1)
- George Smith, Washington (AS-2; SH-1)
- Karl Engebretson, California (AS-2)
- Anderson, Oregon (HH-2)

=== Tackles ===
- Walter Herreid, Washington State (PS-1; GB-1; HH-1; SH-1)
- William Grimm, Washington (PS-1; AS-1; HH-2; SH-1)
- Bartlett, Oregon (GB-1; AS-2; HH-1; SH-1)
- Fred Hamilton, Washington State (AS-2; HH-1)
- R. Hanley, Washington State (AS-1)
- Walker, Oregon Agricultural (AS-2; HH-2)

=== Guards ===
- Elwert, Washington State (PS-1; GB-1)
- Olin Majors, California (GB-1; AS-1)
- Beull Blake, Washington (PS-1; AS-2)
- Edgar Caughey, Stanford (HH-2; SH-1)
- Mautz, Oregon (HH-1)
- Lee Cranmer, California (AS-1)
- Johnson, Oregon Agricultural (HH-2)

=== Centers ===
- Earl Dunlap, Washington State (PS-1; GB-1)
- Sanford Wick, Washington (AS-2; HH-1)
- Simpson, Stanford (AS-1)
- Leslie, Oregon (SH-1)
- Heyden, Oregon Agricultural (HH-2)
- Prink Callison, Oregon (HH-2)

== Key ==
PS = Plowden Stott, "one of the foremost Western football officials"

GB = George Bertz, sporting editor of The Portland Journal

AS = Andy Smith, head coach of California

HH = Homer Woodson Hargiss, head coach of Oregon Agricultural

SH = Shy Huntington, head coach of Oregon

== See also ==
- 1919 College Football All-America Team
