= Herreid =

Herreid may refer to:

- Herreid, South Dakota, a city in Campbell County, South Dakota, United States
- Herreid (surname)
