= James J. Cline =

American football player and coach (1899–1960)

- Cline pictured in Southern Campus 1924, UCLA yearbook

Biographical details
- Born: March 2, 1899; Fremont County, Iowa, U.S.
- Died: July 19, 1969 (aged 70); Los Angeles, California, U.S.

Playing career
- 1918–1919: California

Coaching career (HC unless noted)
- 1923–1924: Southern Branch

Head coaching record
- Overall: 2–10–3

James Jacob Cline (March 2, 1899 – July 19, 1969) was an American football coach. He served as the head football coach at the Southern Branch of the University of California—now known as the University of California, Los Angeles (UCLA)—from 1923 to 1924, comping a record of 2–10–3.

Cline graduated from Pomona High School in Pomona, California, before attending the University of California, Berkeley, where he played for the California Golden Bears under head coach Andy Smith. He was later president of Cline Hardwood Co. in Los Angeles, where he died on July 19, 1969.

== Head coaching record ==
Year	Team	Overall	Conference	Standing	Bowl/playoffs
Southern Branch Grizzlies (Southern California Intercollegiate Athletic Conference) (1923–1924)
1923	Southern Branch	2–5	0–5	6th	
1924	Southern Branch	0–5–3	0–4–1	6th	
Southern Branch:		2–10–3	0–9–1		
Total:		2–10–3			
