= 1924 Southern Branch Grizzlies football team =

American college football season

1924 Southern Branch Grizzlies football
- Conference: Southern California Conference
- Record: 0–5–3 (0–4–1 SCC)
- Head coach: James J. Cline (2nd season)
- Home stadium: Moore Field

1924 Southern California Conference football standings
	Conf.					Overall
Team	W		L		T	W		L		T
Pomona $	5	–	0	–	0	5	–	2	–	0
Occidental	4	–	1	–	0	4	–	4	–	0
Whittier	3	–	2	–	0	4	–	3	–	0
Redlands	1	–	3	–	1	1	–	5	–	2
Caltech	1	–	4	–	0	3	–	6	–	0
Southern Branch	0	–	4	–	1	0	–	5	–	3
$ – Conference champion

The 1924 Southern Branch Grizzlies football team was an American football team that represented the Southern Branch of the University of California (later known as UCLA) during the 1924 college football season. The program, which was later known as the Bruins, was in their second year under head coach James J. Cline. The Grizzlies compiled a 0–5–3 record and were outscored by their opponents by a combined total of 109 to 40.

== Schedule ==
Date	Opponent	Site	Result
October 4	Loyola (CA)*	Moore Field; Los Angeles, CA	T 0–0
October 11	La Verne*	Moore Field; Los Angeles, CA	L 13–14
October 18	at Whittier	Hadley Field; Whittier, CA	L 0–6
October 25	Occidental	Moore Field; Los Angeles, CA	L 7–20
November 1	at Pomona	Alumni Field; Claremont, CA	L 7–50
November 11	at Redlands	Redlands Stadium; Redlands, CA	T 0–0
November 15	at San Diego State*	Balboa Stadium; San Diego, CA	T 13–13
November 22	Caltech	Moore Field; Los Angeles, CA	L 0–6
*Non-conference game
