= 1923 San Diego State football team =

American college football season

1923 San Diego State football

SCJCC champion
- Conference: Southern California Junior College Conference
- Record: 8–2 (2–0 SCJCC)
- Head coach: Charles E. Peterson (3rd season)
- Home stadium: Balboa Stadium; College Field

The 1923 San Diego State football team represented San Diego State Teachers College (Note: San Diego State University was known as San Diego State Teachers College from 1924 to 1934.) during the 1923 college football season. Even though San Diego State became a four-year institution prior to the 1921 season, they competed in the Southern California Junior College Conference (SCJCC) from 1921 to 1924. For conference games, only freshmen and sophomores were eligible to play.

The school's nickname "Aztecs" did not come into being until the 1925 season. From 1921 to 1924, there was no official nickname. At various times, publications used the term "Professors", "Wampus Cats", "Staters" and "Statesmen". The yearbook "Del Sudoeste" published at the end of the 1924–25 school year notes that January 6, 1925 was the date that "Berry, Schellbach and Osenburg christen college 'Aztecs' ".

The 1923 San Diego State team was led by head coach Charles E. Peterson in his third season as football coach of the Aztecs. (Note: San Diego State's Peterson Gym, which opened in 1961, was named after Peterson. At various times during his 37-year career with the Aztecs, Peterson was the athletic director, football coach, basketball coach, track coach, and Dean of Men.) They played home games at both Balboa Stadium and at a field on campus. The Aztecs finished the season as champion of the SCJCC for the second consecutive year, with eight wins and two losses (8–2, 2–0 SCJCC). Overall, the team outscored its opponents 207–82 points for the season.

== Schedule ==
Date	Opponent	Site	Result	Source
September 29	USS Melville (Note: The USS Melville was a navy destroyer that was based in San Diego from 1919 to 1940.)*	Balboa Stadium; San Diego, CA	W 10–3	
October 6	Occidental*	Balboa Stadium; San Diego, CA	L 7–33	
October 13	at Southern Branch*	Moore Field; Los Angeles, CA	L 0–12	
October 19	San Diego Marines (Note: The Marine Corps Recruit Depot (MCRD) in San Diego fielded a team that played against colleges and other military teams from 1922 to 1964.)*	College Field; San Diego, CA	W 14–3	
October 27	at Riverside	Riverside Poly HS Field; Riverside, CA	W 39–3	
November 3	at Santa Barbara State*	Pershing Park; Santa Barbara, CA	W 38–13	
November 12	at Santa Ana	Santa Ana HS Field; Santa Ana, CA	W 26–6	
November 17	San Diego Marines*	College Field; San Diego, CA	W 34–7	
November 24	La Verne*	Balboa Stadium; San Diego, CA	W 27–0	
November 29	Fresno State*	Balboa Stadium; San Diego, CA (rivalry)	W 12–2	
*Non-conference game
