= 1933 Santa Barbara State Roadrunners football team =

American college football season

1933 Santa Barbara State Roadrunners football
- Conference: Southern California Conference
- Record: 1–8 (1–6 SCC)
- Head coach: Harold Davis (6th season)
- Home stadium: Peabody Stadium

1933 Southern California Conference football standings
	Conf.					Overall
Team	W		L		T	W		L		T
Redlands $	6	–	0	–	1	6	–	1	–	1
Whittier	4	–	1	–	2	4	–	4	–	2
La Verne	5	–	2	–	0	3	–	4	–	0
San Diego State	4	–	2	–	1	4	–	4	–	1
Pomona	2	–	5	–	0	2	–	5	–	0
Occidental	2	–	5	–	0	2	–	6	–	0
Caltech	2	–	5	–	0	2	–	7	–	0
Santa Barbara State	1	–	6	–	0	1	–	8	–	0
$ – Conference champion; Conference records include forfeits which are not reflected in overall records.

The 1933 Santa Barbara State Roadrunners football team represented Santa Barbara State College—now known as the University of California, Santa Barbara—as a member of the Southern California Conference (SCC) during the 1933 college football season. Led by sixth-year head coach Harold Davis, Santa Barbara State compiled an overall record of 1–8 with a mark of 1–6 in conference play, placing last out of eight teams in the SCC. Overall, the team was outscored by its opponents 112 to 12 for the season. The Roadrunners were shutout seven times and failed to score more than a touchdown in all nine games. Santa Barbara State played home games at Peabody Stadium in Santa Barbara, California.

== Schedule ==
Date	Opponent	Site	Result	Source
September 22	Santa Barbara Athletic Club*	Peabody Stadium; Santa Barbara, CA	L 0–12	
September 29	La Verne	Peabody Stadium; Santa Barbara, CA	L 6–18	
October 6	Cal Poly*	Peabody Stadium; Santa Barbara, CA	L 0–3	
October 13	Whittier	Peabody Stadium; Santa Barbara, CA	L 0–18	
October 20	at Redlands	Redlands Stadium (Note: This stadium is the predecessor to the current Ted Runner Stadium on the University of Redlands campus, which was opened for the 1968 season); Redlands, CA	L 0–28	
October 28	at Pomona	Claremont Alumni Field; Claremont, CA	L 0–20	
November 3	Occidental	Peabody Stadium; Santa Barbara, CA	W 6–0	
November 10	San Diego State	Peabody Stadium; Santa Barbara, CA	L 0–6	
November 17	Caltech	Peabody Stadium; Santa Barbara, CA	L 0–7	
*Non-conference game
