= 1926 Southern Branch Grizzlies football team =

American college football season

1926 Southern Branch Grizzlies football
- Conference: Southern California Conference
- Record: 5–3 (3–2 SCC)
- Head coach: William H. Spaulding (2nd season)
- Home stadium: Moore Field; Los Angeles Memorial Coliseum

1926 Southern California Conference football standings
	Conf.					Overall
Team	W		L		T	W		L		T
Pomona $	5	–	2	–	0	5	–	2	–	0
Southern Branch	4	–	2	–	0	5	–	3	–	0
Whittier	4	–	2	–	1	4	–	4	–	1
Occidental	3	–	2	–	0	4	–	4	–	1
Caltech	3	–	2	–	0	4	–	3	–	1
La Verne	1	–	1	–	2	2	–	2	–	2
San Diego State	1	–	3	–	1	3	–	4	–	1
Redlands	0	–	7	–	0	0	–	9	–	0
$ – Conference champion

The 1926 Southern Branch Grizzlies football team was an American football team that represented the Southern Branch of the University of California (later known as UCLA) during the 1926 college football season. The program, which was later known as the Bruins, was in their second year under head coach William H. Spaulding. The Grizzlies compiled a 5–3 record and outscored their opponents by a combined total of 153 to 67.

== Schedule ==
Date	Opponent	Site	Result	Attendance
September 25	Santa Barbara State*	Moore Field; Los Angeles, CA	W 25–0	
October 9	San Diego State*	Moore Field; Los Angeles, CA	W 42–7	
October 16	at Whittier	Hadley Field; Whittier, CA	L 6–16	
October 23	at Pomona	Alumni Field; Claremont, CA	W 27–7	
November 6	Occidental	Los Angeles Memorial Coliseum; Los Angeles, CA	W 24–3	
November 13	at Redlands	Redlands Stadium; Redlands, CA	W 26–3	
November 20	Caltech	Moore Field; Los Angeles, CA	L 3–7	
November 27	Iowa State*	Los Angeles Memorial Coliseum; Los Angeles, CA	L 0–20	17,000
*Non-conference game
