= 1923 Southern Branch Grizzlies football team =

American college football season

1923 Southern Branch Grizzlies football
- Conference: Southern California Conference
- Record: 2–5 (0–5 SCC)
- Head coach: James J. Cline (1st season)
- Home stadium: Moore Field

1923 Southern California Conference football standings
	Conf.					Overall
Team	W		L		T	W		L		T
Pomona +	4	–	1	–	0	5	–	2	–	0
Caltech +	4	–	1	–	0	5	–	4	–	0
Occidental	3	–	2	–	0	4	–	3	–	0
Whittier	2	–	3	–	0	4	–	3	–	0
Redlands	2	–	3	–	0	4	–	5	–	1
Southern Branch	0	–	5	–	0	2	–	5	–	0
+ – Conference co-champions

The 1923 Southern Branch Grizzlies football team was an American football team that represented the Southern Branch of the University of California (later known as UCLA) during the 1923 college football season. The team, later known as the Bruins, was in their first year under head coach James J. Cline. The Grizzlies compiled a 2–5 record and were outscored by their opponents by a combined total of 132 to 54.

== Schedule ==
Date	Opponent	Site	Result
October 13	San Diego State*	Moore Field; Los Angeles, CA	W 12–0
October 20	Loyola (CA)	Moore Field; Los Angeles, CA	W 6–0
October 27	Whittier	Moore Field; Los Angeles, CA	L 12–14
November 3	Pomona	Moore Field; Los Angeles, CA	L 6–27
November 12	Redlands	Moore Field; Los Angeles, CA	L 6–12
November 17	at Occidental	Patterson Field; Los Angeles, CA	L 6–20
November 24	at Caltech	Rose Bowl; Pasadena, CA	L 6–59
*Non-conference game
