= 1922 San Diego State football team =

American college football season

1922 San Diego State football

SCJCC champion
- Conference: Southern California Junior College Conference
- Record: 6–4 (4–0 SCJCC)
- Head coach: Charles E. Peterson (2nd season)
- Home stadium: Balboa Stadium; Navy "Sports" Field

The 1922 San Diego State football team represented San Diego State Teachers College (Note: San Diego State University was known as San Diego State Teachers College from 1924 to 1934.) during the 1922 college football season. Even though San Diego State became a four-year institution prior to the 1921 season, they competed in the Southern California Junior College Conference (SCJCC) from 1921 to 1924. For conference games, only freshmen and sophomores were eligible to play.

The school nickname "Aztecs" did not come into being until the 1925 season. From 1921 to 1924, there was no official nickname. At various times, publications used the term "Professors", "Wampus Cats", "Staters" and "Statesmen". The yearbook "Del Sudoeste" published at the end of the 1924–25 school year notes that January 6, 1925 was the date that "Berry, Schellbach and Osenburg christen college 'Aztecs' ".

The 1922 San Diego State team was led by head coach Charles E. Peterson in his second season as football coach of the Aztecs. (Note: San Diego State's Peterson Gym, which opened in 1961, was named after Peterson. At various times during his 37-year career with the Aztecs, Peterson was the athletic director, football coach, basketball coach, track coach, and Dean of Men.) They played home games at both Balboa Stadium and Navy "Sports" Field. (Note: Navy "Sports" Field was the original name of what became Lane Field in downtown San Diego. It was converted to a baseball-only configuration in 1936.) The Aztecs finished the season as champion of the SCJCC with six wins and four losses (6–4, 4–0 SCJCC). Overall, the team outscored its opponents 190–104 points for the season.

== Schedule ==
| Date | Opponent | Site | Result | Attendance |
|---|---|---|---|---|
| September 19 | San Diego Marines (Note: The Marine Corps Recruit Depot (MCRD) in San Diego fielded a team that played against colleges and other military teams from 1922 to 1964.)* | Navy "Sports" Field; San Diego, CA | W 18–0 | |
| September 22 | Coronado HS (CA)* | Navy "Sports" Field; San Diego, CA | W 39–0 | |
| September 26 | Fleet Air Station (CA)* | Navy "Sports" Field; San Diego, CA | L 6–7 | |
| September 30 | at Occidental* | D.W. Patterson Field; Los Angeles, CA | L 7–33 | |
| October 7 | Southern Branch* | Balboa Stadium; San Diego, CA | L 6–25 | |
| October 21 | Whittier* | Balboa Stadium; San Diego, CA | L 7–33 | |
| November 4 | Santa Ana | Balboa Stadium; San Diego, CA | W 50–0 | |
| November 10 | at Fullerton | Fullerton HS Stadium; Fullerton, CA | W 31–0 | |
| November 24 | Riverside | Balboa Stadium; San Diego, CA | W 20–6 | |
| November 30 | at Chaffey | Chaffey HS Field; Ontario, CA | W 6–0 | |
*Non-conference game
