= Herreid (surname) =

Herreid is a surname. Notable people with the surname include:

- Charles N. Herreid (1857–1928), American politician
- Walter Herreid (1896–1941), American football player and coach
