= Charles E. Peterson (coach) =

American football and basketball coach and college dean

Biographical details
- Born: October 2, 1889; Kearney, Missouri, U.S.
- Died: December 17, 1959 (aged 70); San Diego, California, U.S.
- Education: Oregon Agricultural

Coaching career (HC unless noted)

Football
- 1921–1929: San Diego State

Basketball
- 1921–1926: San Diego State

Head coaching record
- Overall: 43–31–4 (football); 70–30 (basketball)

Accomplishments and honors

Championships
- Football; 3 SCJCC (1922–1924)

Charles Everette Peterson (October 2, 1889 – December 17, 1959) was an American college football and college basketball coach and dean. He served as the head football coach at San Diego State University (SDSU) from 1921 to 1929, compiling a record of 43–31–4. He was also the head basketball coach at San Diego State from 1921 to 1926, tallying a mark of 70–30.

Peterson died of a heart attack, on December 17, 1959, at his home in San Diego.

== Head coaching record ==
=== Football ===
Year	Team	Overall	Conference	Standing	Bowl/playoffs
San Diego State Professors / San Diego State (Southern California Junior College Conference) (1921–1924)
1921	San Diego State	4–6	1–3	3rd	
1922	San Diego State	6–4	4–0	1st	
1923	San Diego State	8–2	2–0	1st	
1924	San Diego State	7–1–2	3–0	1st	
San Diego State Aztecs (Independent) (1925)
1925	San Diego State	5–3–1			
San Diego State Aztecs (California Collegiate Athletic Association) (1926–1929)
1926	San Diego State	3–4–1	1–3–1	7th	
1927	San Diego State	4–3	2–3	T–5th	
1928	San Diego State	3–3	2–3	4th	
1929	San Diego State	3–5	1–5	6th	
San Diego State:		43–31–4	16–17–1		
Total:		43–31–4			
National championship Conference title Conference division title or championship game berth
