= Bill Steers =

American football player and coach (1897–1957)

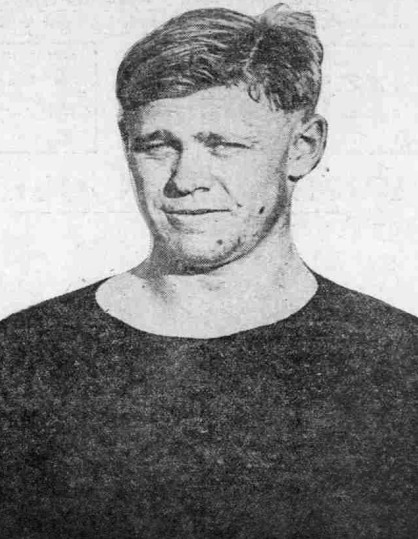

Biographical details
- Born: April 13, 1897
- Died: December 20, 1957 (aged 60); Miami, Florida, U.S.

Playing career

Football
- 1916–1917: Oregon
- 1918: Mare Island Marines
- 1919–1920: Oregon
- Positions: Halfback, quarterback

Coaching career (HC unless noted)

Football
- 1929–1940: California (PA)

Head coaching record
- Overall: 37–40–9

Accomplishments and honors

Awards
- Third-team All–American (1919); 3× First-team All-PCC (1917, 1919, 1920)

William Henry "Wild Bill" Steers (April 13, 1897 – December 20, 1957) was an American college football player and coach and university professor. He served as the head football coach at California University of Pennsylvania in California, Pennsylvania from 1929 to 1940, compiling a record of 37–40–9.

A native of The Dalles, Oregon, Steers played football at the University of Oregon, where he was a member of the 1919 Oregon Webfoots football team, which shared the Pacific Coast Conference (PCC) title and played in the 1920 Rose Bowl. He earned a Master of Arts degree from Oregon in 1929 and a doctorate from Teachers College, Columbia University in 1940. Steers was hired as a professor of physical educator at Ithaca College in 1940. He joined the faculty at the University of Miami in 1945 as a physical education instructor and was later the director of education instruction at the university's School of Education. Steers died on December 20, 1957.

== Head coaching record ==
| Year | Team | Overall | Conference | Standing | Bowl/playoffs |
|---|---|---|---|---|---|
California Vulcans (Independent) (1929–1933)
| 1929 | California | 4–4 | | | |
| 1930 | California | 5–2–1 | | | |
| 1931 | California | 4–2–2 | | | |
| 1932 | California | 2–2–1 | | | |
| 1933 | California | 4–3 | | | |
California Vulcans (Pennsylvania State Teachers Conference) (1934–1940)
| 1934 | California | 4–2–1 | 3–2–1 | 5th | |
| 1935 | California | 4–3 | 3–3 | T–7th | |
| 1936 | California | 3–4–1 | 3–4 | 8th | |
| 1937 | California | 4–3–1 | 1–2–1 | T–7th | |
| 1938 | California | 2–3–2 | 1–2 | T–8 | |
| 1939 | California | 1–7 | 1–3 | 10th | |
| 1940 | California | 1–5 | 1–2 | T–9th | |
| California: | | 37–40–9 | 13–18–2 | | |
| Total: | | 37–40–9 | | | |
