= Walter Herreid =

American football player and coach (1896–1941)

Biographical details
- Born: January 19, 1896; Flandreau, South Dakota, U.S.
- Died: January 11, 1941 (aged 44); Los Angeles, California, U.S.

Playing career
- 1915–1917: Washington State
- Position: Tackle

Coaching career (HC unless noted)
- 1930–1934: San Diego State

Head coaching record
- Overall: 20–21–5

Accomplishments and honors

Awards
- First-team All-PCC (1917)

Walter Benjamin Herreid (January 19, 1896 – November 11, 1941) was an American football player and coach. He served as the head football coach at San Diego State University from 1930 to 1934, compiling a record of 20–21–5. Herreid played college football at Washington State University. He also coached at Beverly Hills High School at Santa Maria High School. Herreid died on November 11, 1941, in Los Angeles, California.

== Head coaching record ==
=== College ===
Year	Team	Overall	Conference	Standing	Bowl/playoffs
San Diego State Aztecs (Southern California Conference) (1930–1934)
1930	San Diego State	5–4	3–3	3rd	
1931	San Diego State	5–3–2	2–2–1	T–4th	
1932	San Diego State	3–5–1	2–4–1	6th	
1933	San Diego State	4–4–1	4–2–1	4th	
1934	San Diego State	3–5–1	2–1–1	2nd	
San Diego State:		20–21–5	13–12–4		
Total:		20–21–5			
