= 1917 All-Pacific Coast football team =

American all-star college football team

The 1917 All-Pacific Coast football team consists of American football players chosen by various organizations for All-Pacific Coast teams for the 1917 college football season.

== All-Pacific Coast selections ==
=== Quarterback ===
- Bill Steers, Oregon (GV-1; PS-1)
- Henry Reardon, Oregon Agricultural (GV-2)

=== Halfbacks ===
- Benton Bangs, Washington State (GV-1; PS-1)
- Wells, California (GV-1; PS-1)
- Raymond Gardner, Washington (GV-2)
- Lodell, Oregon Agricultural (GV-2)

=== Fullback ===
- Ernest Murphy, Washington (GV-1; PS-1)
- Lee Bissett, Oregon Agricultural (GV-2)

=== Ends ===
- Clarence Zimmerman, Washington State (GV-1; PS-1)
- Hubbard, Washington State (GV-1; PS-1)
- L. Hanley, Washington State (GV-2)
- John V. Gifford, California (GV-2)

=== Tackles ===
- Walker, Oregon Agricultural (GV-1; PS-1)
- Walter A. Gordon, California (GV-2; PS-1)
- Walter Herreid, Washington State (GV-1)
- Anderson, Washington (GV-2)

=== Guards ===
- Williams, Oregon Agricultural (GV-1; PS-1)
- Charles Lane, California (GV-2; PS-1)
- Stites, Washington State (GV-1)
- Blake, Washington (GV-2)

=== Centers ===
- Hansen, California (GV-1; PS-1)
- Selph, Oregon Agricultural (GV-2)

== Key ==
GV = George Varnell

PS = Plowden Stott

== See also ==
- 1917 College Football All-America Team
