= Southern California Junior College Conference =

Defunct college athletic conference

The Southern California Junior College Conference (SCJCC) was a junior college athletic conference composed of member schools located in Southern California.

== Football champions ==
- 1922: San Diego State
- 1923: San Diego State
- 1924: San Diego State
- 1925: Riverside
- 1926: Pasadena
- 1927: San Bernardino
- 1928: Pasadena
- 1929: Santa Ana
- 1930: Compton
- 1931: Compton

== Yearly football standings ==
1926 Southern California Junior College Conference football standings
	Conf.					Overall
Team	W		L		T	W		L		T
Pasadena $	4	–	0	–	0	?	–	?	–	?
San Bernardino	3	–	1	–	0	6	–	1	–	0
Riverside	2	–	2	–	0	?	–	?	–	?
Santa Ana	1	–	3	–	0	1	–	7	–	1
Fullerton	0	–	4	–	0	2	–	4	–	1
$ – Conference champion

1927 Southern California Junior College Conference football standings
	Conf.					Overall
Team	W		L		T	W		L		T
San Bernardino $	6	–	1	–	0	11	–	3	–	0
Pasadena	6	–	1	–	0	?	–	?	–	?
Compton	5	–	2	–	0	?	–	?	–	?
Santa Ana	4	–	3	–	0	?	–	?	–	?
Fullerton	2	–	4	–	1	4	–	6	–	1
Riverside	2	–	4	–	1	?	–	?	–	?
Citrus	1	–	4	–	2	?	–	?	–	?
Chaffey	0	–	7	–	0	?	–	?	–	?
$ – Conference champion

1928 Southern California Junior College Conference football standings
	Conf.					Overall
Team	W		L		T	W		L		T
Eastern Division
San Bernardino xy	3	–	0	–	1	4	–	5	–	3
Chaffey	3	–	0	–	1	?	–	?	–	?
Riverside	2	–	2	–	0	?	–	?	–	?
Citrus	1	–	3	–	0	?	–	?	–	?
Pomona Junior College	0	–	4	–	0	?	–	?	–	?
Western Division
Pasadena xy$	3	–	0	–	2	?	–	?	–	?
Compton	3	–	1	–	1	?	–	?	–	?
Fullerton	3	–	1	–	1	5	–	2	–	1
Santa Ana	1	–	2	–	2	3	–	4	–	2
Long Beach	1	–	4	–	0	?	–	?	–	?
Glendale (CA)	0	–	3	–	2	?	–	?	–	?
Championship: Pasadena 18, San Bernardino 0
$ – Conference champion; x – Division champion/co-champions; y – Championship game participant

1929 Southern California Junior College Conference football standings
	Conf.					Overall
Team	W		L		T	W		L		T
Santa Ana $	6	–	1	–	0	7	–	3	–	1
Compton	5	–	2	–	0	?	–	?	–	?
Fullerton	5	–	2	–	0	6	–	4	–	0
Pasadena	5	–	2	–	0	?	–	?	–	?
Chaffey	4	–	3	–	0	?	–	?	–	?
Long Beach	3	–	4	–	0	?	–	?	–	?
Glendale (CA)	2	–	5	–	0	?	–	?	–	?
San Bernardino	1	–	5	–	0	3	–	6	–	0
Riverside	0	–	7	–	0	?	–	?	–	?
$ – Conference champion

1930 Southern California Junior College Conference football standings
	Conf.					Overall
Team	W		L		T	W		L		T
Eastern Division
Riverside xy	4	–	0	–	0	?	–	?	–	?
Chaffey	3	–	1	–	0	?	–	?	–	?
Santa Monica	2	–	2	–	0	?	–	?	–	?
San Bernardino	1	–	3	–	0	3	–	4	–	3
Citrus	0	–	4	–	0	?	–	?	–	?
Western Division
Compton xy$	5	–	0	–	1	?	–	?	–	?
Fullerton	3	–	2	–	1	3	–	4	–	1
Pasadena	3	–	3	–	0	?	–	?	–	?
Santa Ana	2	–	2	–	2	4	–	4	–	2
Glendale (CA)	2	–	4	–	0	?	–	?	–	?
Long Beach	2	–	4	–	0	?	–	?	–	?
Los Angeles Junior College	2	–	4	–	0	?	–	?	–	?
Championship: Compton 20, Riverside 14
$ – Conference champion; x – Division champion/co-champions; y – Championship game participant

1931 Southern California Junior College Conference football standings
	Conf.					Overall
Team	W		L		T	W		L		T
Eastern Division
Riverside xy	5	–	0	–	0	?	–	?	–	?
Chaffey	2	–	1	–	2	?	–	?	–	?
Pomona Junior College	2	–	1	–	2	?	–	?	–	?
San Bernardino	1	–	2	–	2	3	–	4	–	3
Citrus	1	–	4	–	0	?	–	?	–	?
Santa Monica	1	–	4	–	0	?	–	?	–	?
Western Division
Compton xy$	5	–	0	–	1	?	–	?	–	?
Long Beach	3	–	0	–	3	?	–	?	–	?
Glendale (CA)	3	–	2	–	1	?	–	?	–	?
Fullerton	3	–	3	–	0	3	–	4	–	1
Pasadena	3	–	3	–	0	?	–	?	–	?
Santa Ana	1	–	4	–	1	3	–	5	–	2
Los Angeles Junior College	0	–	6	–	0	?	–	?	–	?
Championship: Compton 7, Riverside 6
$ – Conference champion; x – Division champion/co-champions; y – Championship game participant

1932 Western Division (California) football standings
	Conf.					Overall
Team	W		L		T	W		L		T
Pasadena $	4	–	0	–	1	?	–	?	–	?
Santa Monica	2	–	1	–	2	?	–	?	–	?
Compton	2	–	2	–	1	?	–	?	–	?
Los Angeles Junior College	2	–	2	–	1	?	–	?	–	?
Long Beach	1	–	2	–	2	?	–	?	–	?
Glendale (CA)	0	–	4	–	1	?	–	?	–	?
$ – Conference champion

1933 Western Division (California) football standings
	Conf.					Overall
Team	W		L		T	W		L		T
Los Angeles Junior College $	4	–	0	–	2	?	–	?	–	?
Glendale (CA)	4	–	1	–	1	?	–	?	–	?
Compton	2	–	2	–	2	?	–	?	–	?
Santa Monica	2	–	2	–	2	?	–	?	–	?
Ventura	2	–	3	–	1	4	–	3	–	1
Long Beach	2	–	4	–	0	?	–	?	–	?
Pasadena	1	–	5	–	0	?	–	?	–	?
$ – Conference champion

1934 Western Division (California) football standings
	Conf.					Overall
Team	W		L		T	W		L		T
Glendale (CA) $	5	–	0	–	1	?	–	?	–	?
Los Angeles Junior College	5	–	1	–	0	?	–	?	–	?
Compton	3	–	3	–	0	?	–	?	–	?
Ventura	1	–	2	–	3	4	–	2	–	4
Long Beach	1	–	3	–	2	?	–	?	–	?
Pasadena	1	–	4	–	1	?	–	?	–	?
Santa Monica	1	–	4	–	1	?	–	?	–	?
$ – Conference champion

1935 Western Division (California) football standings
	Conf.					Overall
Team	W		L		T	W		L		T
Ventura $	2	–	0	–	2	6	–	3	–	2
Long Beach	2	–	1	–	1	?	–	?	–	?
Los Angeles Junior College	2	–	1	–	1	?	–	?	–	?
Glendale (CA)	1	–	3	–	0	?	–	?	–	?
Santa Monica	1	–	3	–	0	?	–	?	–	?
$ – Conference champion

1936 Western Division (California) football standings
	Conf.					Overall
Team	W		L		T	W		L		T
Los Angeles Junior College $	3	–	1	–	0	?	–	?	–	?
Glendale (CA)	2	–	1	–	1	?	–	?	–	?
Ventura	2	–	1	–	1	5	–	4	–	1
Long Beach	1	–	3	–	0	?	–	?	–	?
Santa Monica	1	–	3	–	0	?	–	?	–	?
$ – Conference champion

1937 Western Division (California) football standings
	Conf.					Overall
Team	W		L		T	W		L		T
Los Angeles Junior College +	2	–	0	–	2	?	–	?	–	?
Ventura +	3	–	1	–	0	7	–	2	–	0
Santa Monica	2	–	2	–	0	?	–	?	–	?
Glendale (CA)	1	–	2	–	1	?	–	?	–	?
Long Beach	0	–	3	–	1	?	–	?	–	?
+ – Conference co-champions
