= San Diego State Aztecs football =

College football team

2026 San Diego State Aztecs football team
- First season: 1921; 105 years ago
- Athletic director: John David Wicker
- Head coach: Sean Lewis; 2nd season, 12–13 (.480)
- Location: San Diego, California
- Stadium: Snapdragon Stadium (capacity: 35,000)
- NCAA division: Division I FBS
- Conference: Pac-12
- Colors: Scarlet and black
- All-time record: 604–460–32 (.566)
- Bowl record: 10–11 (.476)

Small college national championships
- 1966, 1967, 1968

Conference championships
- SCJCC: 1922, 1923, 1924 SCIAC: 1936, 1937 CCAA: 1950, 1951, 1962, 1966, 1967 Big West: 1969, 1970, 1972, 1973, 1974 WAC: 1986 MW: 2012, 2015, 2016

Division championships
- WAC Pacific: 1998 MW West: 2014, 2015, 2016, 2019, 2021
- Consensus All-Americans: 11
- Rivalries: Fresno State (rivalry)
- Fight song: "Fight On"
- Marching band: Marching Aztecs
- Website: goaztecs.com

The San Diego State Aztecs football team is the college football program that represents San Diego State University (SDSU). The Aztecs compete in NCAA Division I (FBS) as a member of the Pac-12 Conference. The team plays its home games at Snapdragon Stadium.

Beginning play in 1921, the Aztecs first went to a bowl game in 1948 and first won a major college bowl game in 1969. The Aztecs have won 21 conference championships and are 10–10 all time in post-season bowl games.

Notable alumni include Pro Football Hall of Fame inductees Marshall Faulk, John Madden, and Joe Gibbs.

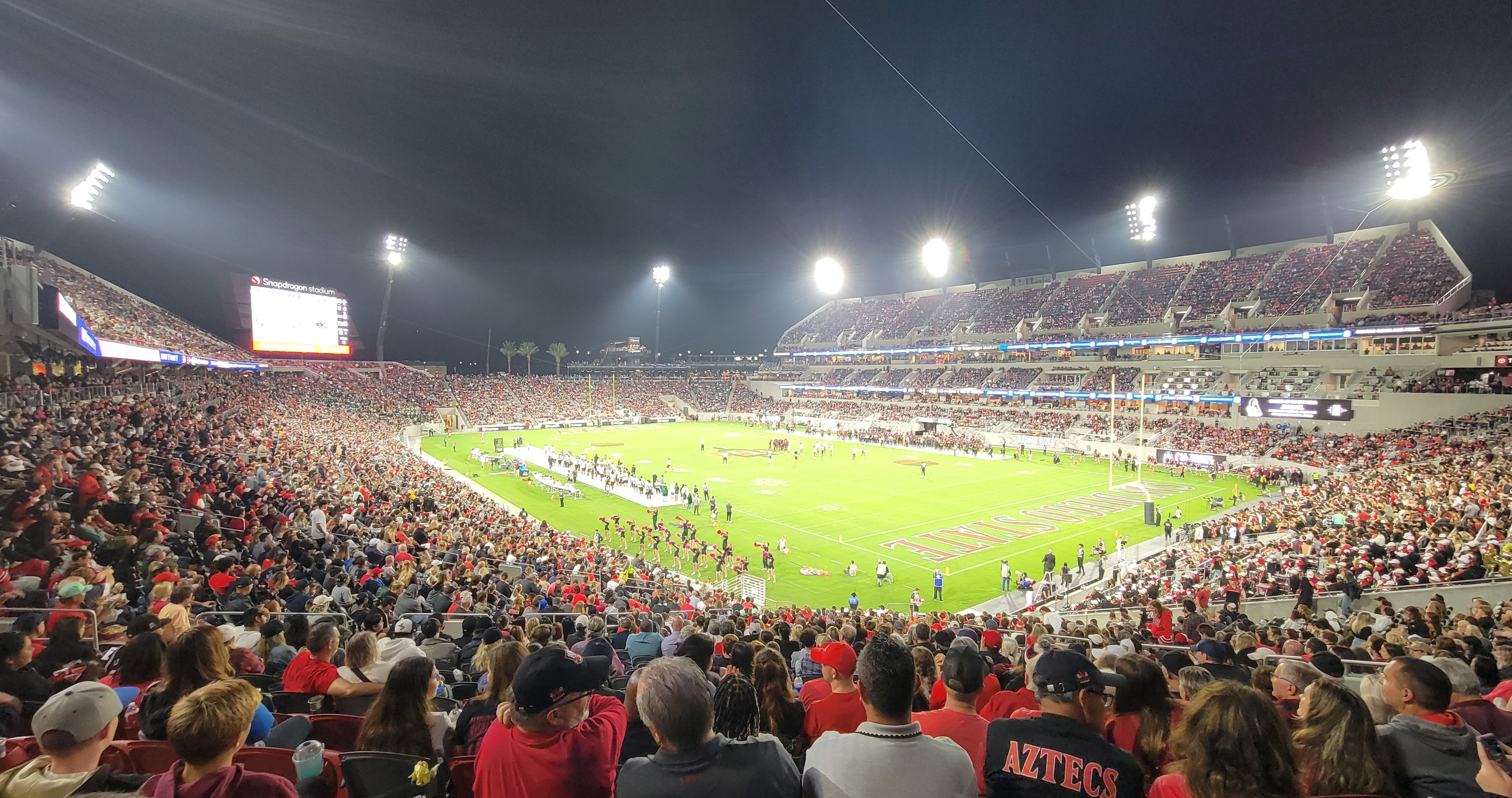
Snapdragon Stadium, home of San Diego State Aztecs football

== History ==
=== Early history (1921–1935) ===
San Diego State University was originally two separate schools. San Diego Normal School had school colors of white and gold. San Diego Junior College had school colors of blue and gold. The schools decided to merge in 1921 to form San Diego State College. The first school colors of SDSC were blue, white and gold. The team had their first football game during the 1921 school year.

The central athletic figure at San Diego State at the time was Charles E. Peterson. Peterson had originally been appointed in 1916 as a physical education instructor. After serving in World War I, President Hardy prevailed upon him to return and oversee the school's athletics program. Initially, Peterson taught all the men's physical education classes and coached all the intercollegiate teams. After the athletic teams were established in 1921, media referred to the teams as "Staters" or "professors". The school newspaper tried to encourage "Wampus Cats" during its coverage of the 1923–24 school year. In the fall of 1924, Athletic Director C.E. Peterson urged the students to select a nickname. The school newspaper, The Paper Lantern, invited suggestions. Over the next few issues, names such as Panthers, Balboans, and Thoroughbreds were suggested and submitted to a committee of Dean Al Peterson, C.E. Peterson, and a student. In 1925, student leaders chose the nickname "Aztecs". The group felt the terminology was more representative of a southwest image and the selection met with no dissent. In February 1925, President Hardy gave his formal approval to the "Aztec" nickname and teams adopted the identity within a week.

Purple and gold were adopted for the 1922–23 term, however, problems arose due to the colors similarity to San Diego's St. Augustine High School. Additionally, purple and gold were the colors of Whittier College, a fierce conference rival at the time, and manufacturers of Aztec merchandise in that era refused to guarantee the color fastness of San Diego State's purple hues. Associated Students president Terrence Geddis led the movement for a change, and after pushing for reconsideration of school colors, students voted on the matter in December 1927. This was followed by two days of voting the following month where students were to decide between Scarlet and Black and the previous color scheme, Purple and Gold. On January 19, 1928, the tally was 346–201 in favor of Scarlet and Black, and it has remained ever since.

=== Small college era (1936–1968) ===
==== Don Coryell impact ====
Don Coryell became the SDSC head coach in 1961, while in the California Collegiate Athletic Association. Coryell led the Aztecs to two "small college" undefeated seasons in 1966 and 1968 and from the College Division (now split into Divisions II and III, with the current D-II championship considered to be the successor to the College Division championship) to the University Division (now NCAA Division I, since divided into FBS and FCS) in 1969.

=== Pacific Coast Athletic Association era (1969–1977) ===
San Diego State was a charter member of the Pacific Coast Athletic Association, which was founded on July 1, 1969, and later became the Big West Conference.

==== Don Coryell continuing legacy ====
Coryell was head coach for a total of 12 seasons with the Aztecs, using the philosophy of recruiting only junior college players. There, he compiled a record of 104 wins, 19 losses and 2 ties including a total of three undefeated seasons in 1966, 1968, and 1969. His teams had winning streaks of 31 and 25 games, and won three bowl games during his tenure. It was at SDSC that Coryell began to emphasize a passing offense, recounting, "We could only recruit a limited number of runners and linemen against schools like USC and UCLA, and there were a lot of kids in Southern California passing and catching the ball. There seemed to be a deeper supply of quarterbacks and receivers, and the passing game was also open to some new ideas." Coryell added, "Finally we decided it's crazy that we can win games by throwing the ball without the best personnel. So we threw the hell out of the ball and won some games. When we started doing that, we were like 55–5–1." John Madden served as Coryell's defensive assistant at SDSC. Madden had first met Coryell attending a coaching clinic on the I formation led by McKay. "We'd go to these clinics, and afterward, everyone would run up to talk to McKay", said Madden. "Coryell was there because he introduced (McKay). I was thinking, 'If (McKay) learned from him, I'll go talk to (Coryell).'" At San Diego State, Coryell helped develop a number of quarterbacks for the NFL, including Don Horn, Jesse Freitas, Dennis Shaw and future NFL MVP Brian Sipe. Wide receivers who went on to the NFL include Isaac Curtis, Gary Garrison, Ken Burrow, and Haven Moses. Coryell also coached two players who later became actors: Fred Dryer and Carl Weathers. Following the 1972 season, he moved to the NFL and became head coach of the St. Louis Cardinals.

=== Western Athletic Conference era (1978–1999) ===
==== The Big 80's ====
During the 1980s at San Diego State, the Aztecs were led by record-setting quarterbacks Todd Santos and Dan McGwire, who later became the tallest quarterback in the history of the NFL (in 1991). The Aztecs won the WAC Championship in 1986 and played at home in the Holiday Bowl against Iowa, but lost by a point 39–38. In 1990, the team played Miami in a game that featured violent fights and a near upset.

==== Marshall Faulk's impact ====
Marshall Faulk was a standout high school athlete who played both running back and cornerback. Faulk received several recruitment offers from top colleges in the NCAA, however, because of his standout performance on defense, intercepting 11 passes as a senior, he was primarily recruited to play as a defensive back. Faulk ended up accepting an athletic scholarship to attend San Diego State, as they were the first school to offer him a scholarship to play the running back position. Faulk was recruited by Curtis Johnson, and coached by Bret Ingalls and future New Orleans Saints head coach, Sean Payton. In one of the most prolific performances of his entire career, he played against University of the Pacific in just his second collegiate game on September 14, 1991. In 37 carries, Faulk racked up 386 yards and scored seven touchdowns, both records for freshmen (the 386 yards were then an NCAA record). "Faulk had scoring runs of 61, 7, 47, 9, 5, 8 and 25 yards." That performance sparked one of the greatest freshman seasons in NCAA history, gaining 1,429 yards rushing, with 23 total touchdowns (21 rushing), and 140 points scored. Faulk went on to better 1,600 yards rushing in his sophomore year. In Faulk's junior season in 1993, he caught 47 passes for 640 yards and 3 touchdowns to go with 1,530 yards and 21 touchdowns on the ground, putting him 3rd in the nation in all-purpose yardage that year, and 2nd in scoring.

Faulk left San Diego State with many of the school's offensive records, among them 5,562 all-purpose yards and 62 career touchdowns, the 8th most in NCAA history. After his 1992 season at SDSU, Faulk finished second in the Heisman Trophy award, losing to quarterback Gino Torretta in what was considered a notable snub in the history of the award. Torretta's Miami Hurricanes had again gone undefeated in the regular season and were ranked No. 1 in the country before the Heisman balloting. Faulk's team finished with a middling 5–5–1 record, continuing a trend of the Heisman going to the most notable player on one of the nation's best teams. Faulk was a Heisman finalist as well in 1991 (9th) and 1993 (4th). With a year of eligibility remaining, Faulk declared for the NFL draft and was the second overall selection in April 1994. He went on to make 7 Pro Bowls and win three NFL Offensive Player of the Year awards during his NFL career. In 2017, he was enshrined to the College Football Hall of Fame.

=== Mountain West Conference and Pac-12 Conference era (2000–present) ===
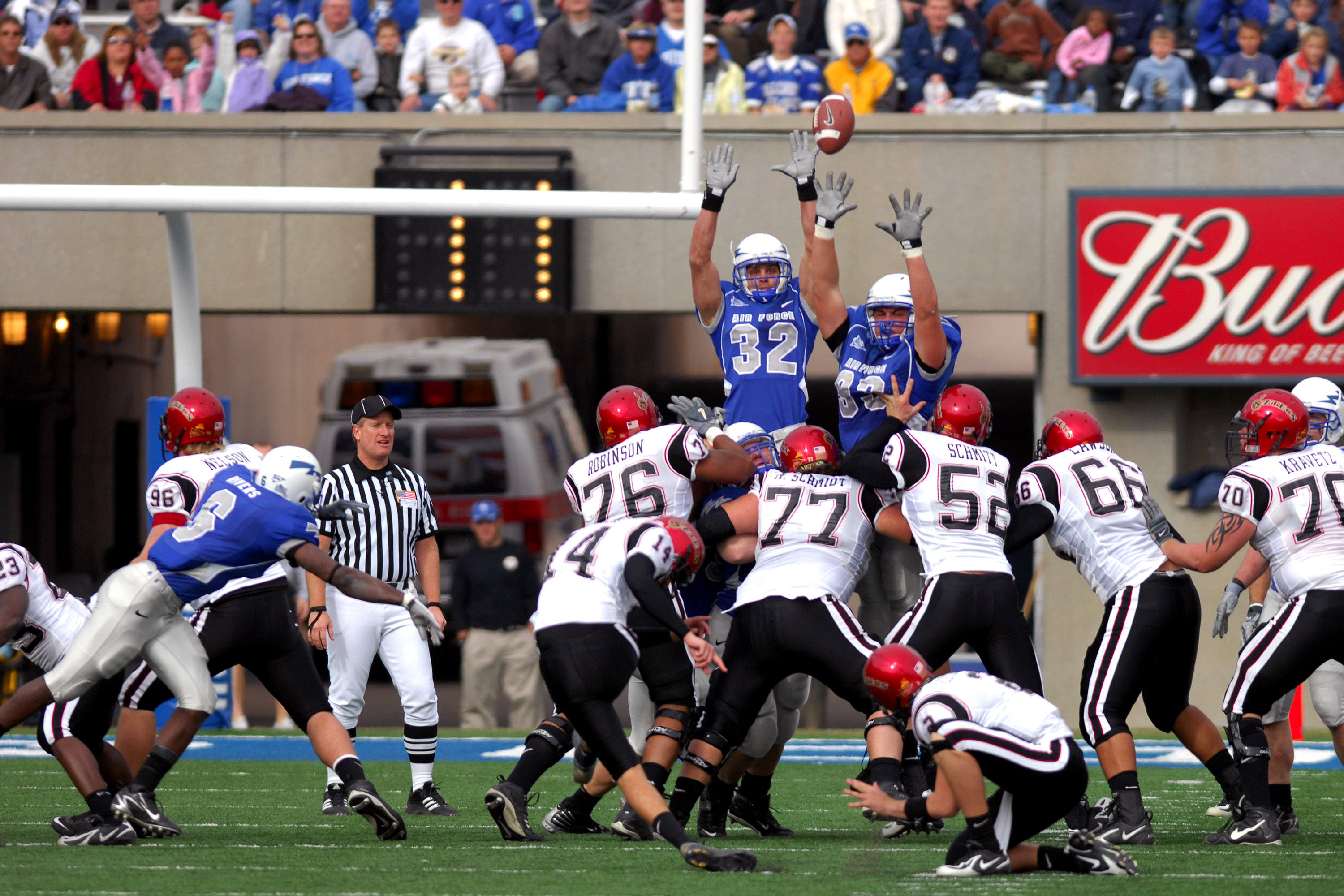
The Aztecs attempt a field goal during a 2007 game against Mountain West Conference opponent Air Force in 2007

In the year 2000, San Diego State became a charter member of the Mountain West Conference. The team was scheduled to become a football-only member of the Big East Conference in July 2013, but on January 17, the Mountain West's board of directors voted to reinstate the university.

==== Brady Hoke (first tenure) ====
In December 2008, Brady Hoke was hired as the 17th head football coach at San Diego State. Hoke signed a five-year contract with a guaranteed payment of $3.525 million, plus incentives for hitting revenue marks and bowl berths. San Diego State was also required to pay $240,000 to buy out the remaining two years on Hoke's contract at Ball State. San Diego State compiled a 2–10 record the year before Hoke arrived. In 2009, Hoke led the Aztecs to a record of 4–8. During the 2010 season, Hoke's team improved to 9–4. Two of the Aztecs' losses in 2010 came in close matches against ranked opponents. The Aztecs gave the undefeated, No. 2 TCU team its closest game of the regular season, losing by a score of 40–35. Hoke's team also lost a close game against No. 12 Missouri by a score of 27–24. The team concluded its season with a 35–14 win over Navy in the 2010 Poinsettia Bowl. Prior to the 2010 season, San Diego State had not won nine games in a season since 1977 when they went 10–1 finishing 16th in the API and had not played in a bowl game since the 1998 team lost in the Las Vegas Bowl. After the 2010 season, a reporter for the Orange County Register wrote that Hoke had given San Diego State "swagger."

==== Rocky Long tenure ====
After Hoke accepted the head coaching job at Michigan defensive coordinator Rocky Long was immediately named the new head coach. Long served as the head coach of New Mexico from 1998 to 2008 where he compiled 65 victories and 5 bowl game appearances in 10 years. During his first five years as head coach of the Aztecs (2011–2015), he led the Aztecs to five bowl games and won San Diego State's first MW title in 2012 (shared), followed by an outright MW Championship in 2015. As of January 1, 2016, he has a 43–23 overall record as head coach of the Aztecs with a 30–9 conference record. In 2015, San Diego State earned an 11–3 record under Long, culminating with a 42–7 victory over Cincinnati. With the backing of San Diego State's "Win 21" campaign, the Aztecs notched their 21st conference championship in 2016 by winning the Mountain West championship game vs. the Wyoming Cowboys.

San Diego State holds the top position in the "Pac-12" Power rankings (2025), and recent losses by the other group of five teams have improved their prospects for reaching the College Football Playoff. While their playoff path is still considered unlikely, it is not less complicated, even though they still compete with other teams for the automatic CFP berth.

== Championships ==
=== National championships ===
SDSU has won 3 NCAA national championships at the Division II level.

Season	Conference	Coach	Overall record	Conference record
1966	California Collegiate Athletic Association	Don Coryell	11–0	5–0
1967	California Collegiate Athletic Association	Don Coryell	10–1	5–0
1968	Independent	Don Coryell	9–0–1	N/A

=== Conference championships ===
Season	Conference	Coach	Overall record	Conference record
1922	Southern California Junior College Conference	Charles E. Peterson	6–4	4–0
1923	Southern California Junior College Conference	C. E. Peterson	8–2	2–0
1924	Southern California Junior College Conference	C. E. Peterson	7–1–2	3–0
1936	Southern California Intercollegiate Athletic Conference	Leo B. Calland	6–1–1	5–0
1937	Southern California Intercollegiate Athletic Conference	Leo B. Calland	7–1	4–1
1950	California Collegiate Athletic Association	Bill Schutte	5–3–1	3–0–1
1951	California Collegiate Athletic Association	Bill Schutte	10–0–1	4–0
1962	California Collegiate Athletic Association	Don Coryell	8–2	6–0
1966	California Collegiate Athletic Association	Don Coryell	11–0	5–0
1967	California Collegiate Athletic Association	Don Coryell	10–1	5–0
1969	Pacific Coast Athletic Conference	Don Coryell	11–0	6–0
1970	Pacific Coast Athletic Conference	Don Coryell	9–2	5–1
1972	Pacific Coast Athletic Conference	Don Coryell	10–1	4–0
1973	Pacific Coast Athletic Conference	Claude Gilbert	9–1–1	3–0–1
1974	Pacific Coast Athletic Conference	Claude Gilbert	8–2–1	4–0
1986	Western Athletic Conference	Denny Stolz	8–4	7–1
2012†	Mountain West Conference	Rocky Long	9–4	7–1
2015	Mountain West Conference	Rocky Long	11–3	8–0
2016	Mountain West Conference	Rocky Long	11–3	6–2

† Co-champions

=== Division championships ===
Following the 1995 season the Western Athletic Conference split into Mountain and Pacific divisions with the division champions meeting in the WAC Championship Game. San Diego State left the WAC after the 1998 season to become a charter member of the new Mountain West Conference. Following the 2012 season, the Mountain West Conference split into Mountain and West divisions with the division champions meeting in the Mountain West Conference Football Championship Game. San Diego State has been champion (or co-champion) of a division six times and have appeared in three conference championship games.

Season	Division	Coach	Opponent	CG result
1998†	WAC - Pacific Division	Ted Tollner	DNQ - Lost tiebreaker to BYU	
2014†	MW - West Division	Rocky Long	DNQ - Lost tiebreaker to Fresno State	
2015	MW - West Division	Rocky Long	Air Force	W 27–24
2016	MW - West Division	Rocky Long	Wyoming	W 27–24
2019†	MW - West Division	Rocky Long	DNQ - Lost tiebreaker to Hawaii	
2021	MW - West Division	Brady Hoke	Utah State	L 13–46

† Co-champion and did not qualify for conference championship game

=== All-time record vs. current Pac-12 teams ===
Official record against all current Pac-12 opponents as of October 21, 2026.

Opponent	Games played	Won	Lost	Ties	Percentage	Streak	First meeting
Boise State	11	5	6	0	.455	Won 1	2011
Colorado State	38	23	15	0	.605	Won 1	1978
Fresno State	63	32	27	4	.516	Won 3	1923
Oregon State	8	2	6	0	.250	Lost 6	1972
Texas State	1	1	0	0	1.000	Won 1	2026
Utah State	18	13	5	0	.722	Lost 3	1947
Washington State	4	1	3	0	.250	Lost 2	2007

== Rankings ==
San Diego State football has finished Top 25 in the nation per the AP poll 3 times in school history.

1977	2016	2021
16	25	25

== Bowl games ==
SDSU is 10–11 all time in post-season bowl games. They first went to a bowl game in 1948 and first won a major-college bowl game in 1969.

Date	Coach	Bowl	Opponent	Result
January 1, 1948	Bill Schutte	Harbor Bowl	Hardin–Simmons	L 0–53
January 1, 1952	Bill Schutte	Pineapple Bowl	Hawaii	W 34–13
December 10, 1966	Don Coryell	Camellia Bowl	Montana State	W 28–7
December 9, 1967	Don Coryell	Camellia Bowl	San Francisco State	W 27–6
December 6, 1969	Don Coryell	Pasadena Bowl	Boston University	W 28–7
December 30, 1986	Denny Stolz	Holiday Bowl	Iowa	L 38–39
December 30, 1991	Al Luginbill	Freedom Bowl	Tulsa	L 17–28
December 19, 1998	Ted Tollner	Las Vegas Bowl	North Carolina	L 13–20
December 23, 2010	Brady Hoke	Poinsettia Bowl	Navy	W 35–14
December 17, 2011	Rocky Long	New Orleans Bowl	Louisiana–Lafayette	L 30–32
December 20, 2012	Rocky Long	Poinsettia Bowl	BYU	L 6–23
December 21, 2013	Rocky Long	Famous Idaho Potato Bowl	Buffalo	W 49–24
December 23, 2014	Rocky Long	Poinsettia Bowl	Navy	L 16–17
December 24, 2015	Rocky Long	Hawaii Bowl	Cincinnati	W 42–7
December 17, 2016	Rocky Long	Las Vegas Bowl	Houston	W 34–10
December 23, 2017	Rocky Long	Armed Forces Bowl	Army	L 35–42
December 19, 2018	Rocky Long	Frisco Bowl	Ohio	L 0–27
December 21, 2019	Rocky Long	New Mexico Bowl	Central Michigan	W 48–11
December 21, 2021	Brady Hoke	Frisco Bowl	UTSA	W 38–24
December 24, 2022	Brady Hoke	Hawaii Bowl	Middle Tennessee	L 23–25
December 27, 2025	Sean Lewis	New Mexico Bowl	North Texas	L 47–49

Rankings from the AP poll

On November 29, 1981, San Diego State played the Air Force Falcons in the Mitsubishi Mirage Bowl at Tokyo Olympic Stadium in Tokyo, Japan which was a regular season game sponsored by the Mitsubishi Motors, losing 21–16. It is not considered a sanctioned bowl and does not reflect on San Diego States's all-time bowl record.

== Stadiums ==
=== Balboa Stadium (1921–1935) ===
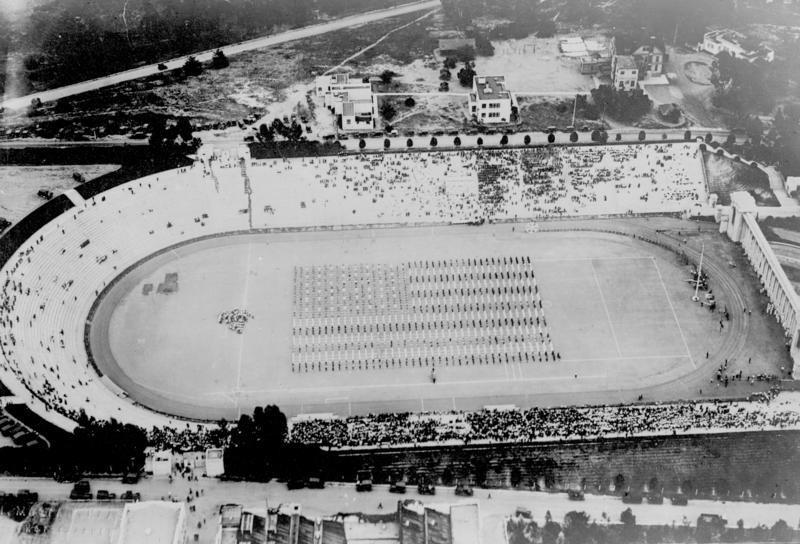
Balboa Stadium

The Aztecs (formerly "Staters") began playing football when SDSU was still known as San Diego Normal School and then San Diego State Teacher's College, and located on Park Boulevard in University Heights. During this period, the football team called Balboa Stadium home (formerly "City Stadium"). At the time, the seating capacity for Balboa Stadium was 15,000. It was later expanded to 34,000 capacity and served as the home stadium for the San Diego Chargers of the American Football League (AFL) from 1961 to 1966.

=== Aztec Bowl (1935–1966) ===
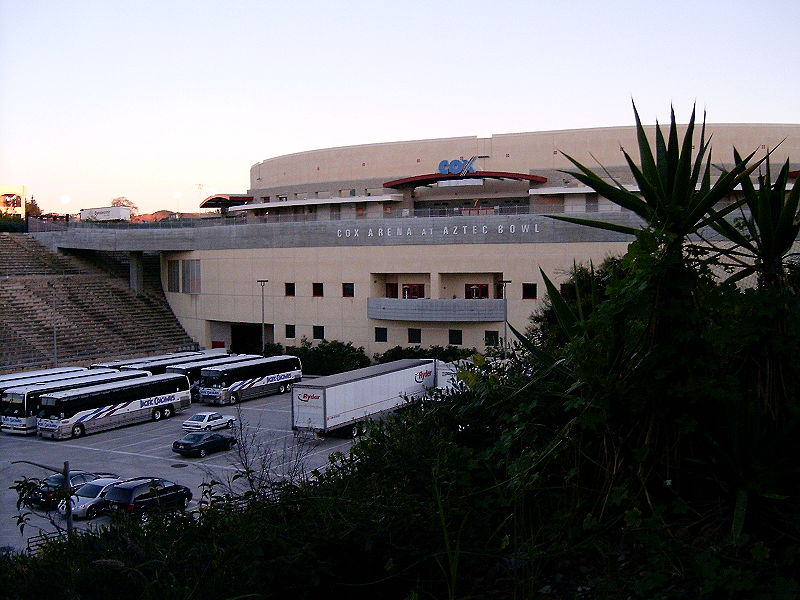
Aztec Bowl (historic site as it exists today) is now the site of Viejas Arena

After the university relocated from University Heights to its current location in 1931, accommodations were made on the new campus for a football stadium to be constructed beginning in 1933. The Aztecs played their home games in the on-campus Aztec Bowl during the 30-year period between 1936 and 1966. At the time of its completion in 1936, Aztec Bowl could accommodate 7,500 fans and was the only state college stadium in California. The stadium's capacity was later expanded to a seating capacity of 12,592 fans in 1948. Given the growth of the college and its fan base, the Aztecs found themselves in need of a larger venue, but the previously proposed expansion to 45,000 seats was delayed until 1966. During this final year in Aztec Bowl, the Aztecs won their first of three consecutive "small college" (Division II) National Championships. About 80% of Aztec Bowl was covered up (rather than demolished) in 1996 to make way for Viejas Arena (formerly named Cox Arena), current home of the San Diego State Aztecs men's basketball and women's basketball teams. Formerly listed on the National Register of Historic Places, a portion of Aztec Bowl remains visible on the north side of Viejas Arena.

=== San Diego Stadium (1967–2019) ===
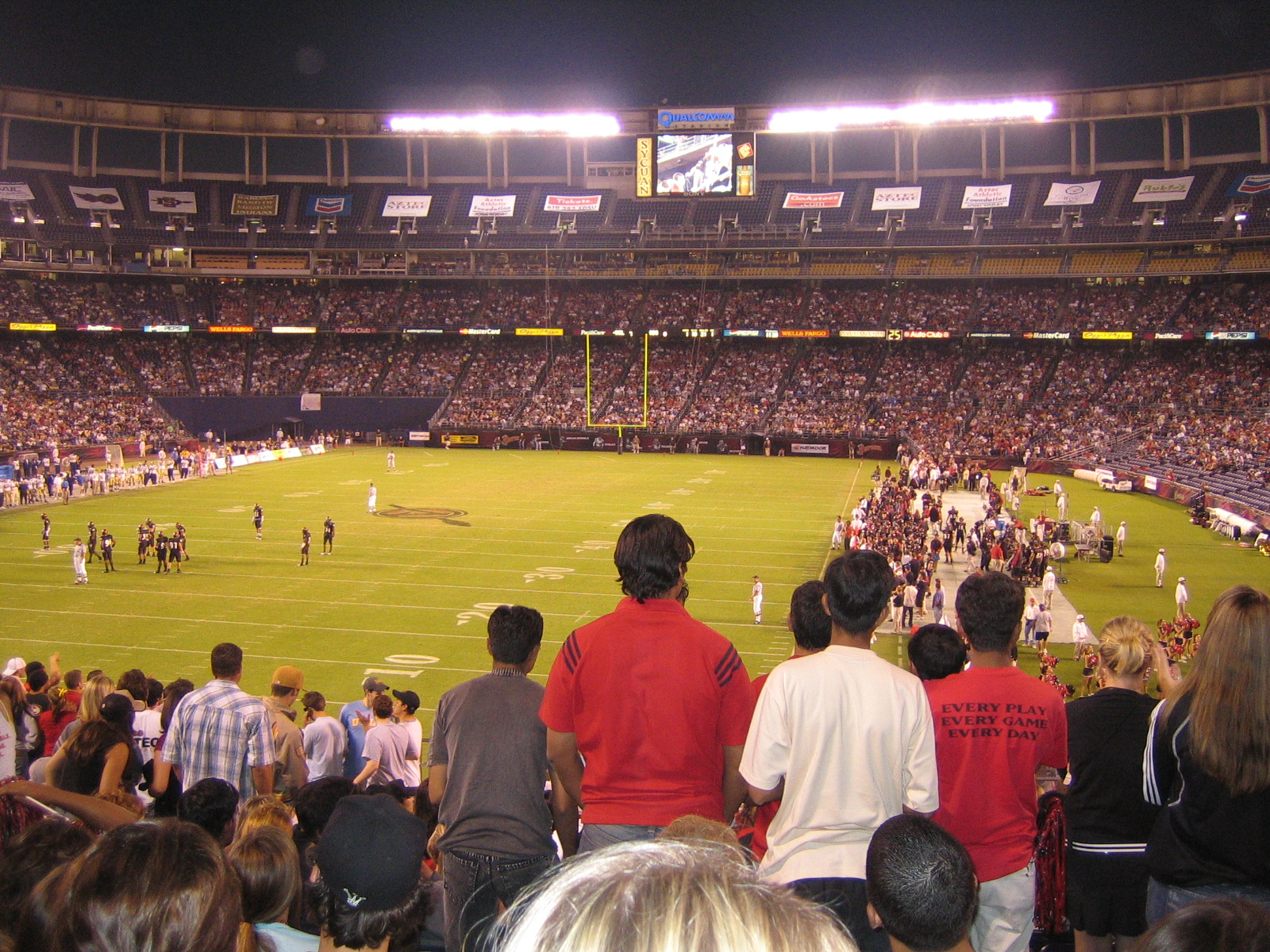
San Diego Stadium – SDSU Aztecs vs UCLA College Football

From its opening in 1967 through the 2019 season, San Diego Stadium had been the home of San Diego State University Aztecs football. San Diego Stadium, also known as Jack Murphy Stadium, Qualcomm Stadium, and SDCCU Stadium during its existence, was a multi-purpose stadium located in the Mission Valley area of San Diego, about 5 miles from campus. The campus and stadium have been connected by the San Diego Trolley since 2005.

The stadium had also been home to the NFL's San Diego Chargers from 1967 to 2016, and also hosted the San Diego Padres from 1969–2003. It also hosted the Holiday Bowl and the San Diego County Credit Union Poinsettia Bowl college football games every December. The stadium hosted three Super Bowl games, two Major League Baseball All-Star Games, and two World Series. It is the only stadium ever to host both the Super Bowl and the World Series in the same year (1998).

Playing in a professional sports facility provided some benefits including improved concessions, luxury suites, "jumbo-tron" screens and other amenities for Aztecs fans. However, the increasing capacity of the stadium (from 52,596 in 1967 to 70,561 in 2015) created a mismatch for a college football program that drew an average of 29,065 fans to home games in 2015—during an 11–3 MW Championship season, which was their best performance since joining Division I in 1969. The facility was frequently filled to less than 40% of capacity. In their final years in the facility, the Aztecs tarped off significant sections of the upper seating bowl for their games, creating a reduced capacity of 54,000.

On September 15, 2020, the school announced that the stadium would be demolished in early 2021, rather than being demolished after completion of Aztec Stadium as planned. As a result of the delay of the 2020 season due to the COVID-19 pandemic, the 2019 season was the final season of Aztecs football at the stadium. The final home game was on November 30, 2019, against BYU, where San Diego State won 13–3.

=== Dignity Health Sports Park (2020–2021) ===
On September 15, 2020, the school announced that the Aztecs would play football at Dignity Health Sports Park in Carson, California for the 2020 and 2021 football seasons while the program's new Snapdragon Stadium was being built. The decision was made primarily to allow for SDCCU Stadium to be demolished in spring 2021 to allow for construction of the new stadium to be expedited.

The stadium was over 110 miles north of the SDSU campus, which was a logistical challenge for both the team and its fanbase. However, in 2020, the season was disrupted by the COVID-19 pandemic and all home games were played behind closed doors, thus rendering the location of the stadium a moot point for the fans. The Aztecs won all 4 of their home games but lost all 4 of their road games. The Aztecs drew small home crowds in 2021, ranging from 7,619 to 13,445, but they went 7–1 in Carson on their way to an outstanding 12–2 overall record.

Ironically, for the previous three seasons, the stadium had been the temporary home of the erstwhile San Diego Chargers who previously shared San Diego Stadium with the Aztecs for 50 seasons before moving to Los Angeles in 2017.

=== Snapdragon Stadium (2022–present) ===
In 2015, the San Diego Chargers stepped up their efforts to relocate to Los Angeles, pending a vote of National Football League owners and a partnership with the Oakland Raiders or St. Louis Rams. In the face of this development, contingency plans were generated for the future use of the then-current SDCCU Stadium site in Mission Valley. One proposal put forward by State Senator Marty Block was for San Diego State to take over use of the site in order to expand the campus and also provide for a new multi-use 40,000-seat stadium for Aztecs football and a Major League Soccer team. There were two plans for the newly-vacant stadium land. The first was SDSU West, later renamed SDSU Mission Valley, which called for expanding the campus to Mission Valley and creating a stadium built primarily for San Diego State athletics, as well as new educational facilities for students. The second plan, entitled Soccer City, would use the land solely to build a new stadium housing both San Diego State athletics and an MLS team.

On January 13, 2016, the Chargers gained NFL approval to join the Rams in a move to Los Angeles. On January 12, 2017, the Chargers announced that they would move to Los Angeles for the 2017 season. On November 6, 2018, SDSU Mission Valley would be approved on the San Diego ballot, besting Soccer City (committee supporting the MLS soccer route instead of expanding the campus and making an on-campus stadium).

On December 5, 2019, the school announced receipt of a $15 million gift to help finance the new stadium, which would be named Bashor Field at Aztec Stadium. The school announced plans to begin construction of Aztec Stadium in April 2020, with anticipated completion in time for the 2022 season and the Aztecs' September 3, 2022 matchup against Arizona. During construction, Qualcomm, which had once sponsored San Diego Stadium, entered into a naming rights contract with the university. The new stadium will accordingly open as Snapdragon Stadium, bearing the name of Qualcomm's system-on-chip.

== Traditions ==
=== Montezuma ===
The first Aztec Warrior figure associated with the university initially appeared at a San Diego State athletic event over six decades ago. Art Munzig played the original role in a skit during halftime at the San Diego State-Pomona football game kicking off the 1941 football season. The school's Rally Committee came up with the idea based on the ruler of the Aztec empire in the early 1500s, Moctezuma II. The character, affectionately known as "Monty" to generations of SDSU alumni, evolved through the years to become emblematic of San Diego State's athletic teams.

For decades the role was filled mostly by students. In 1983, however, Director of Athletics Mary Hill directed Montezuma to adopt a more dignified persona. During that football season, Monty sat atop a pyramid among his attendants on the sidelines at Jack Murphy Stadium. That lasted one year. The next season Moctezuma resumed his more traditional role of involvement and encouragement of Aztec football fans.

Beginning in 2000, some student groups began to propose the university alter its Aztec identity. The new mascot made his first public appearance February 23, 2004 to reveal some costume changes and the modified moniker, "Aztec Warrior." For all but a few years from the early 1990s through 2006, Carlos Gutierrez took over the role of mascot, raising the position's profile and expanding public appearances throughout the San Diego community. In April 2006, the SDSU Alumni Association sponsored student auditions for a new Aztec Warrior.

=== Warrior Walk ===
The team accompanied by the San Diego State Marching Aztecs Drumline, additional members of the spirit squad, and fans walk from the stadium parking lot to the tunnel which leads the team onto the field. This usually occurs two hours before kickoff.

=== Honorary Warrior ===
An honorary team captain, usually a former player of the team, leads the team onto the field before kickoff.

=== Warrior Shield ===
An Aztec warrior shield that the accompanies the team on the sidelines during home and away games. The shield is held high by the captains during the singing of the Fight Song following victories.

== Rivalries ==
=== Fresno State ===
The Battle for the Oil Can

The Fresno State-San Diego State rivalry, also known as the Battle for the Oil Can, dates back to 1923 when the two teams competed in the SCJCC. The Aztecs winning the initial meeting 12–2 at home. Since then, the sides have met 51 more times, including every year from 1945 to 1979, when the two competed in the same conference or were independents. After not facing one another between 1979 and 1991, the schools resumed the annual series from 1992 to 1998, when both were members of the Western Athletic Conference. The two teams have met twice since then, in 2002 and 2011. With Fresno State joining the Mountain West Conference in 2012 and the addition of the divisional format, the Aztecs and the Bulldogs will compete on an annual basis once again.

One of the most memorable games between the two schools was known as "The Fog Bowl" in 1962. The fog was so thick that the Aztec radio announcer at the time Al Couppee couldn't see the plays, so he went down to the field and into the huddle to give the play-by-play. The Aztecs won the game 29–26 in a thrilling fashion.

The two schools started competing in 2011 for the Oil Can trophy. The Oil Can trophy comes from a 1930s-era oil can hailing from Fresno that was found at a construction site at San Diego State. "The oil can likely came from a time when Aztec and Bulldog fans traveled to football games between the two schools via the old, twisting, precipitous Grapevine section of Highway 99 over Tejon Pass", said Jacquelyn K. Glasener, executive director of the Fresno State Alumni Association. "Cars in those days carried extra oil and water to be sure they could make it through difficult trips", added Jim Herrick, executive director of the San Diego State Alumni Association. The game was dubbed by fans the Battle for the Oil Can. The first trophy game was played in 2011. The Aztecs were favored but however they found themselves trailing 21–0 in the first half. They battled back scoring four unanswered touchdowns to win 35–28, with Ronnie Hillman scoring the go-ahead touchdown in the fourth quarter to win the game. The Aztecs ended the season with an 8–4 record and made it to the New Orleans Bowl and the Bulldogs ended the season 4–8. San Diego State leads the all-time series with a record of 27–22–4, including a 14–11–2 mark in San Diego, Fresno State leads the trophy series 3–2. In 2016, the series is tied. Fresno State assumed a 4–2 lead in the trophy series with their 27–3 victory over the Aztecs on October 21, 2017, at SDCCU (formerly Qualcomm) Stadium.

San Diego State leads the series 31–27–4 as of 2025.

=== San Jose State ===
El Camino Real Rivalry

The rivalry between the two Cal State schools dates back to 1935. The matchup is named after the historic 600-mile Camino Real that connects the 21 Spanish missions in California, stretching from San Diego Bay in the south to San Francisco Bay in the north. The San Diego State Aztecs and San Jose State Spartans have played each other 47 times as of the 2023 season. A common storyline in sports, is that of the San Francisco Bay Area vs. Southern California rivalry, such as the Giants and the Dodgers in the MLB, and the Sharks and Kings in the NHL. This SJSU and SDSU rivalry benefits from that sort of bragging rights perspective that both teams undoubtedly look to hold onto each year.

The Spartans currently have the longest win streak in the series with 11 consecutive wins from 1938 to 1952. As of 2023, San Diego State leads the series 24–21–2.

In 2014, there were conversations between the two programs about creating a trophy using an old mission bell or a replica of an old Spanish mission bell to be awarded to the winner of the rivalry game, but no trophy ever materialized.

=== BYU ===
Although it is seen as a lopsided rivalry according to the BYU fan base, with no future games scheduled as of 2022, the two schools have played each other 38 times with BYU leading the series 28–9–1; SDSU has never won consecutive meetings. BYU's 24–21 win in Provo in 2010 came to be known as "replay-gate". BYU defeated SDSU 23–6 in the 2012 Poinsettia Bowl, and was the first scheduled meeting since BYU left the Mountain West in 2011 and went independent in football. Aztecs fans have long considered BYU their biggest – most hated – rival. It is not reciprocated, with the Cougars having a big in-state rivalry with Utah and medium-sized rivalry with Utah State.

Former head coach Rocky Long said: "You know, anybody that's over 60, we understand, but anybody under 30 has no idea how heated those rivalries were because BYU was one of the top teams in the country for years and years and years."

== Hall of Fame ==
College Football Hall of Fame
Name	Position	Year	Inducted
George Brown	G	1947	1985
Don Coryell	Coach	1961–72	1999
Fred Dryer	DE	1967–68	1997
Marshall Faulk	HB	1991–93	2017

Pro Football Hall of Fame
Name	Position	Year	Inducted
Joe Gibbs	Coach	1964–66	1996
John Madden	Coach	1964–66	2006
Marshall Faulk	HB	1991–93	2011
Don Coryell	Coach	1961-1972	2023

== Retired numbers ==
San Diego State has retired three numbers in honor of four players.

San Diego State Aztecs retired numbers
No.	Player	Pos.	Tenure	Ref.
8	Todd Santos	QB	1984–1987	
25	Haven Moses	WR	1966–1967	
28	Willie Buchanon	CB	1970–1971	
28	Marshall Faulk	RB	1991–1993	

== National award winners ==
Corbett Award

Corbett Award
Year	Name	Position
2000	Cedric Dempsey	Athletic Director
2007	Fred L. Miller	Athletic Director

This honor is awarded annually by the National Association of Collegiate Directors of Athletics (NACDA). It is presented "to the collegiate administrator who has most typified Corbett's devotion to intercollegiate athletics and worked unceasingly for its betterment."

Walter Camp Man of the Year Award

Walter Camp Man of the Year
Year	Name	Position at SDSU	Career at SDSU
2012	Herm Edwards	Cornerback	1975

The Walter Camp Man of the Year is given to the "Man of the Year" in the world of college football. The criteria for the award are "success, leadership, public service, integrity, and commitment to American heritage and Walter Camp's philosophy."

Sam Baugh Trophy

Sam Baugh Trophy
Year	Name	Position
1973	Jesse Freitas	Quarterback

This honor is given by the Touchdown Club of Columbus, awarded annually to the nation's top collegiate passer.

Jim Brown Award

Jim Brown Award
Year	Name	Position
1992	Marshall Faulk	Halfback
2016	Donnel Pumphrey	Halfback

This honor is given by the Touchdown Club of Columbus to the NCAA's top running back of the year.

Ray Guy Award

Ray Guy Award
Year	Name	Position
2021	Matt Araiza	Punter

The Ray Guy Award is presented annually to college football's most outstanding punter as presented by the Augusta Sports Council.

== All-Americans ==
- Haven Moses, DE- 1967 (TSN 1st)
- Fred Dryer, DE- 1968 (Little All-American 1st)
- Hank Allison, G- 1970 (AP-2nd; NEA-1st; PFW-1st; Time-1st; TSN-1st)
- Willie Buchanon, DB- 1971 (NEA-2nd; Time-1st; TSN-1st)
- Jesse Freitas Jr., QB- 1973 (AP-3rd)
- Craig Penrose, QB- 1975 (TSN-1st; Time-1st)
- Henry Williams, DB- 1978 (AFCA-1st, UPI-2nd)
- Pete Inge, OG- 1978 (AP-2nd)
- Pete Inge, OG- 1979 (AP-2nd, UPI-2nd)
- Trey White, DE- 2024 (HERO Sports G5 -1st)
- Tyler Pastula, P- 2024 (HERO Sports G5 -1st)
- Marquez Cooper, HB- 2024 (HERO Sports G5 -3rd)

== Aztecs in the NFL ==
=== Active NFL ===
Updated October 2026

Player	NFL team
Matt Araiza	Kansas City Chiefs
Keshawn Banks	Minnesota Vikings
Daniel Bellinger	Tennessee Titans
Daniel Brunskill	Los Angeles Chargers
Darren Hall	Washington Commanders
D. J. Herman	Miami Dolphins
Chris Johnson	Miami Dolphins
Segun Olubi	Las Vegas Raiders
Tyrell Shavers	Buffalo Bills
Cameron Thomas	Atlanta Falcons

== Future non-conference opponents ==
Announced schedules as of January 14, 2026.

2026	2027	2028	2029
Portland State	at Eastern Michigan	at Missouri	Oklahoma
at UCLA	Missouri	Arizona State	at Arizona State
James Madison	at Oklahoma	Hawaii	at Hawaii
at Toledo			

2030	2031	2032	2033	2034
Central Michigan	at Oklahoma		Missouri	at Missouri
	UCLA		at Louisiana Tech	Louisiana Tech
	Northern Illinois			

== Notable alumni ==
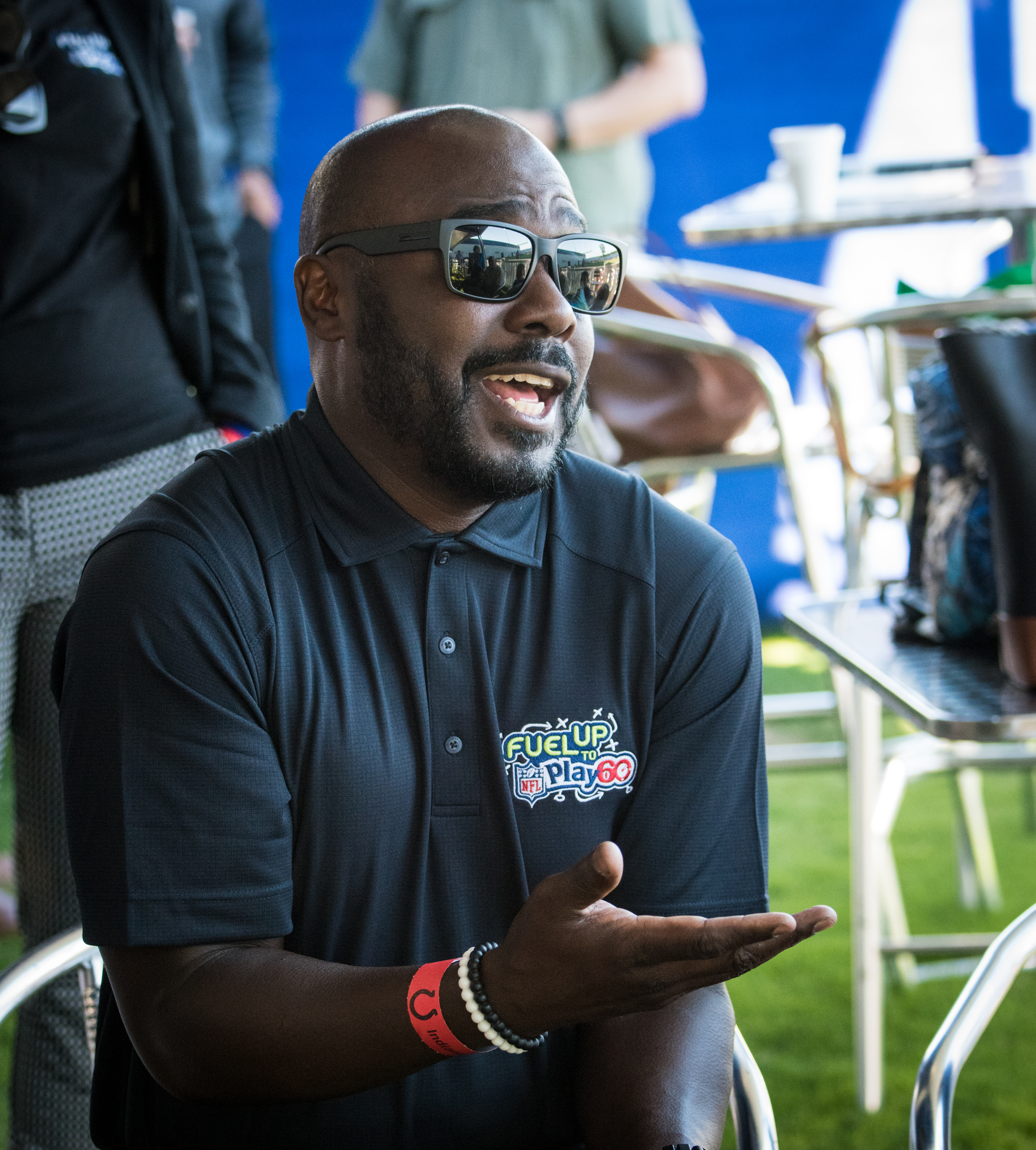
Marshall Faulk is the only Aztec inducted into the Pro Football Hall of Fame. He was a 3x first-team All-American at SDSU, left SDSU as its all-time leading rusher, and went on to win the 2000 NFL MVP, Super Bowl XXXIV, and three NFL Offensive Player of the Year awards.

San Diego State athletics have contributed to the National Football League (NFL).

Notable San Diego State alumni players:

- Marshall Faulk – Hall of Fame, NFL MVP (2000), 3× NFL Offensive Player of the Year, 2x NFL scoring leader, 7x- Pro Bowl, running back for the Indianapolis Colts and St. Louis Rams.
- Dennis Shaw – 1970 AFC Offensive Rookie of the Year, played eight years in the NFL for the Buffalo Bills, St. Louis Cardinals, New York Giants, and Kansas City Chiefs.
- Dan McGwire – QB was the 16th pick in 1991 by the Seattle Seahawks, playing six years in the NFL. Dan is the brother of former Major League slugger Mark McGwire.
- Brian Sipe – NFL quarterback; part of the "Kardiac Kids" for the Cleveland Browns.
- Isaac Curtis – 4x-Pro Bowl wide receiver for the Cincinnati Bengals.
- Kirk Morrison – Linebacker for the Buffalo Bills.
- Kassim Osgood – 3x-Pro Bowl wide receiver and top special teams player for the San Diego Chargers and Jacksonville Jaguars – All American transfer from Cal Poly.
- Roberto Wallace – NFL wide receiver for the Miami Dolphins.
- Fred Dryer – NFL defensive end for the New York Giants and Los Angeles Rams. Film and television actor, notably starring in the series Hunter.
- Ken Burrow- NFL Second round draft choice 1971 Atlanta Falcons.
- Ronnie Hillman – NFL running back for the Denver Broncos, drafted in the third round of the 2012 NFL draft.
- Miles Burris – NFL linebacker for the Oakland Raiders, drafted in the fourth round of the 2012 NFL draft.
- Ryan Lindley – NFL quarterback for the Arizona Cardinals, drafted in the sixth round of the 2012 NFL draft.
- Vince Warren – NFL Super Bowl champion
- Kabeer Gbaja-Biamila – NFL defensive end for the Green Bay Packers, drafted in the fifth round of the 2000 NFL draft, later inducted into the Green Bay Packers Hall of Fame.
- Akbar Gbaja-Biamila - NFL undrafted 2003, played for Oakland, Miami and San Diego. Gbajabiamila co-hosts American Ninja Warrior.
- La'Roi Glover NFL 14-year defensive lineman for Oakland Raiders, New Orleans Saints, Dallas Cowboys, St. Louis Rams. Inducted into the Saints Hall of Fame. Multiple Pro Bowl and All Pro seasons. Current Director of Player Engagement for Los Angeles Rams.
- Ricky Parker– NFL defensive back Chicago Bears Jacksonville Jaguars, drafted in the sixth round of the 1997-98 NFL Draft.

NFL head coaches were members of the Aztec Football program:

- Joe Gibbs – Hall of Fame NFL head coach of the Washington Redskins, Super Bowl winning coach, NASCAR team owner, former Aztec player and assistant coach.
- John Madden – Hall of Fame AFL/NFL head coach of the Oakland Raiders, Super Bowl winning coach, longtime NFL broadcaster, and namesake of the Madden video game series; former Aztec assistant coach.
- Don Coryell – Former NFL head coach of the San Diego Chargers, former Aztec head coach.
- Ted Tollner – Current NFL assistant coach for the Oakland Raiders, former assistant coach of the Detroit Lions, San Francisco 49ers and San Diego Chargers, former Aztec head coach.
- Herm Edwards – Former head coach for the Arizona State Sun Devils, former NFL head coach of the New York Jets and Kansas City Chiefs, former analyst for NFL Live on ESPN, 2011 Walter Camp Man of the Year Award and former Aztec player.
- John Fox – Former NFL head coach of the Chicago Bears, former NFL head coach of the Carolina Panthers and the Denver Broncos, former Aztec player.
- Sean Payton – NFL head coach of the New Orleans Saints, Super Bowl Winning Coach, former Aztec offensive assistant, former Aztec running backs coach
- Tom Cable – Former NFL head coach of the Oakland Raiders, former Aztec assistant coach
- Brian Billick – Former NFL head coach of the Baltimore Ravens, Super Bowl Winning Coach, former Aztec assistant coach
- Kevin O'Connell – NFL head coach of the Minnesota Vikings, former Aztec and NFL quarterback.

== See also ==
- Aztec Hall of Fame
