= Peterson Gymnasium =

Multi-purpose arena in San Diego, California, United States

- Interactive map of Peterson Gymnasium
- Address: 5340 55th Street
- Location: San Diego, California
- Coordinates: 32°46′27″N 117°04′36″W
- Owner: San Diego State University
- Operator: San Diego State University; Associated Students of SDSU
- Capacity: 3,668 (238 seatbacks)
- Record attendance: 2,358
- Public transit: MTS Local 11 from SDSU Transit Center

Construction
- Opened: May 1961

Tenants
- San Diego State Aztecs (NCAA) (1961–present); San Diego Conquistadors (ABA) (1972–1973)

Peterson Gymnasium (or Peterson Gym) is an indoor arena in San Diego, California, located on the campus of San Diego State University (SDSU). Opened in 1961, it is the home of the San Diego State Aztecs women's volleyball team. The Aztecs compete in NCAA Division I as a member of the Pac-12 Conference (Pac-12). The Peterson Gym building also contains classrooms for lectures.

== History ==
Peterson Gym is named after Charles E. Peterson, who during his 37-year career at San Diego State University served as athletic director, football coach, track coach, basketball coach, Dean of Men and alumni executive secretary.

Aztec Court at Peterson Gym has been home to several San Diego State Aztecs varsity sports teams over the years, including the now-defunct men's volleyball team (discontinued in 2000), which won the school's first (and-to-date only) NCAA Division I national championship in any sport, at the 1973 NCAA men's volleyball tournament (which was hosted by SDSU and played at Peterson Gym). The men's and women's basketball teams also played at Peterson Gym until moving across the street to Cox Arena (now known as Viejas Arena) upon its opening in 1997.

In 1972–73, Peterson Gym was home of the American Basketball Association (ABA)'s San Diego Conquistadors. The Conquistadors were coached by Naismith Basketball Hall of Fame inductee and former Boston Celtics player K.C. Jones. The team finished with a 30–54 record. Following the season, the team switched its home arena to the San Diego Sports Arena.

Today, Peterson Gym also contains some classrooms for lectures.
