= Caltech Beavers =

- University: California Institute of Technology
- Nickname: Beavers
- NCAA: Division III
- Conference: SCIAC
- Location: Pasadena, California
- Varsity teams: 16 (8 men's, 8 women's)
- Basketball arena: Braun Gymnasium
- Baseball stadium: North Field
- Soccer stadium: South Field
- Aquatics center: Braun Pool
- Tennis venue: Caltech Tennis Courts
- Outdoor track and field venue: Fox Stanton Track
- Colors: Orange and white
- Mascot: Bernoulli Beaver
- Website: gocaltech.com

The Caltech Beavers are the athletic teams of the California Institute of Technology (Caltech) in Pasadena, California. The Beavers compete in NCAA Division III as members of the Southern California Intercollegiate Athletic Conference (SCIAC), which they co-founded in 1915.

== History ==
- On January 6, 2007, the Beavers' men's basketball team snapped a 207-game losing streak to Division III schools, beating Bard College 81–52. It was their first Division III victory since 1996. Until their win over Occidental College on February 22, 2011 the team had not won a game in SCIAC play since 1985. Ryan Elmquist's free throw with 3.3 seconds in regulation gave the Beavers the victory. The documentary film Quantum Hoops concerns the events of the Beavers' 2005–06 season.
- On January 13, 2007, the Caltech women's basketball team snapped a 50-game losing streak, defeating the Pomona-Pitzer Sagehens 55–53. The women's program, which entered the SCIAC in 2002, garnered their first conference win. On the bench as honorary coach for the evening was Robert Grubbs, 2005 Nobel laureate in Chemistry. The team went on to beat Whittier College on February 10, for its second SCIAC win, and placed its first member on the All Conference team.
- On February 2, 2013, the Caltech baseball team ended a 228-game losing streak, the team's first win in nearly 10 years.
- In 2024, the Caltech baseball team won ten games for the first time in over 60 years.

== Sports sponsored ==
Caltech has 18 teams (9 for men and 9 for women), competing in baseball, men's basketball, women's basketball, men's cross country, women's cross country, men's soccer, women's soccer, men's swimming and diving, women's swimming and diving, men's tennis, women's tennis, men's indoor track and field, men's outdoor track and field, women's indoor track and field, women's outdoor track and field, women's volleyball, men's water polo, and women's water polo. Caltech used to field teams in football (1893–1993), men's golf (1935–2002), men's fencing (??-2018), women's fencing (1971-2018), and men's wrestling (1962–1989).

Men's teams	Women's teams
Baseball	Basketball
Basketball	Cross Country
Cross country	Soccer
Soccer	Swimming & diving
Swimming & diving	Tennis
Tennis	Track & field^{1}
Track & field^{1}	Volleyball
Water polo	Water polo
^{1} – includes both indoor and outdoor

== Former sports ==
The school also sponsored an intercollegiate football team from 1893 through 1993, and played part of its home schedule at the Rose Bowl. Caltech also had teams in men's golf (1935–2002), and men's wrestling (1962–1989).

== Facilities ==
The track and field team's home venue is at the South Athletic Field in Tournament Park, the site of the first eight Rose Bowl games.

== Conference championships ==
The Beavers have won 29 conference championships in their history. All 29 have come in men's sports, and the most recent title was in 1972. Had the award existed at the time, Caltech would have won the 1941–42 SCIAC all-sports trophy.

Team	Titles	Winning years	Ref.
Baseball	2	1922, 1956	
Basketball (m)	2	1943, 1954	
Cross country (m)	4	1940, 1941, 1942, 1948	
Football	3	1923, 1930, 1931	
Golf (m)	2	1942, 1954	
Swimming (m)	8	1940, 1941, 1942, 1956, 1959, 1960, 1961, 1962	
Track and field (m)	3	1926, 1942, 1945	
Water polo (m)	2	1960, 1964	
Wrestling	3	1970, 1971, 1972	
Total	29		

== See also ==
- California Institute of Technology
- Caltech–MIT rivalry
- Great Rose Bowl Hoax
