= Southern California Intercollegiate Athletic Conference =

College athletic conference that operates in the NCAA's Division III

- Association: NCAA
- Founded: 1915
- Commissioner: Jennifer Dubow
- Sports fielded: 21; men's: 10; women's: 11
- Division: Division III
- No. of teams: 10
- Headquarters: Laguna Niguel, California
- Region: Southern California
- Website: thesciac.org

Locations
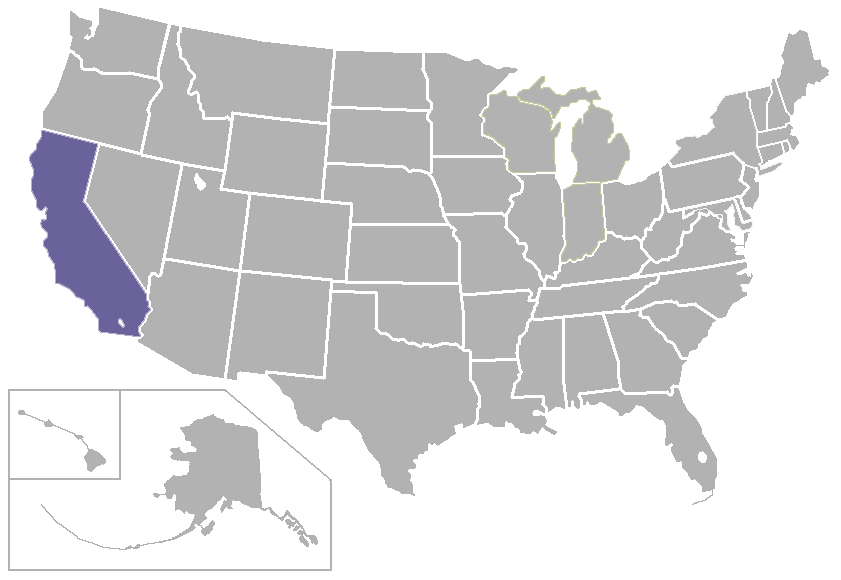

Southern California Intercollegiate Athletic Conference
Location of SCIAC members: current

The Southern California Intercollegiate Athletic Conference (SCIAC) is an intercollegiate athletic conference that operates in NCAA Division III. The conference was founded in 1915 and it consists of twelve small private schools that are located in Southern California and organized into nine athletic programs. Claremont-Mudd-Scripps and Pomona-Pitzer are combined teams for sports purposes.

The SCIAC currently sponsors men's baseball, men's and women's basketball, men's and women's cross country, football, men's and women's golf, women's lacrosse, men's and women's soccer, softball, men's and women's swimming and diving, men's and women's tennis, men's and women's track and field, women's volleyball and men's and women's water polo.

== History ==
SCIAC logo before 2010.

A forerunner conference to the SCIAC was the Intercollegiate Football Association of Southern California, which existed in the 1890s. It included Occidental, Caltech (then called Throop Polytechnic), USC, Chaffey College and Los Angeles High School.

The SCIAC was founded in 1915 with five member schools with the goals to promote amateurism in athletics. The five founding members, all of whom are still members, are Throop College of Technology (now California Institute of Technology), Occidental College, Pomona College, the University of Redlands, and Whittier College. Although all five original charter members are still affiliated with the SCIAC, only two, Occidental and Redlands, have had uninterrupted membership. The acronym SCIAC (standing for Southern California Interscholastic Athletic Council) was in use during 1913 and 1914 until that organization became the CIF Southern Section.

On May 12, 2011, the SCIAC announced that Chapman University would become the ninth member, beginning with the 2011–12 academic year. The addition of Chapman marks the first expansion of the conference since California Lutheran University joined in 1991. At one time, most of the colleges were the southern California affiliates of various Christian denominations such as the Quakers and the Presbyterians. Today, only California Lutheran University maintains an affiliation with a church.

There are three former members of the SCIAC: University of California, Los Angeles, San Diego State University and University of California, Santa Barbara. All former members now compete in NCAA Division I athletics.

=== Chronological timeline ===
- 1915 – The Southern California Intercollegiate Athletic Conference (SCIAC) was founded. Charter members included Occidental College, Pomona College, the University of Redlands, Throop College of Technology (now California Institute of Technology) and Whittier College, beginning the 1915–16 academic year.
- 1920 – The Southern Branch of the University of California (now the University of California at Los Angeles, or UCLA) joined the SCIAC in the 1920–21 academic year.
- 1926 – La Verne College (now the University of La Verne) and San Diego State Teachers College (now San Diego State University) joined the SCIAC in the 1926–27 academic year.
- 1927 – UCLA left the SCIAC after the 1926–27 academic year.
- 1931 – Santa Barbara State College (now the University of California at Santa Barbara) joined the SCIAC in the 1931–32 academic year.
- 1934 – Caltech and Pomona left the SCIAC after the 1933–34 academic year.
- 1938:
  - La Verne and UC Santa Barbara left the SCIAC after the 1937–38 academic year
  - Caltech and Pomona rejoined the SCIAC in the 1938–39 academic year.
- 1939 – San Diego State left the SCIAC after the 1938–39 academic year.
- 1943 – Whittier left the SCIAC after the 1942–43 academic year.
- 1946 – Whittier rejoined the SCIAC in the 1946–47 academic year.
- 1947 – Claremont Men's College (now Claremont McKenna College) joined the SCIAC in the 1947–48 academic year.
- 1950 – Chapman College (now Chapman University) joined the SCIAC in the 1950–51 academic year.
- 1952 – Chapman left the SCIAC after the 1951–52 academic year.
- 1958 – Claremont combined with Harvey Mudd College for athletics to become Claremont–Mudd, beginning the 1958–59 academic year.
- 1971 – Pomona combined with Pitzer College for athletics to become Pomona–Pitzer, while La Verne rejoined the SCIAC, both effective in the 1971–72 academic year.
- 1976 – Claremont–Mudd combined with Scripps College for athletics to become Claremont–Mudd–Scripps, beginning the 1976–77 academic year.
- 1991 – California Lutheran University joined the SCIAC, effective in the 1991–92 academic year.
- 2011 – Chapman rejoined the SCIAC in the 2011–12 academic year.
- 2020 – Occidental dropped its football program before the start of the 2020 fall season (2020–21 academic year).
- 2023 – Whittier dropped its football program after the 2022 fall season (2022–23 academic year).
- 2026
  - Azusa Pacific University began its transition from NCAA Division II and the Pacific West Conference to Division III and the SCIAC in conjunction with the restart of its football program for the 2026 fall season (2026–27 academic year).
  - Whittier reinstated its football program for the 2026 season.

== Member schools ==
=== Current member schools ===
The SCIAC currently has ten full members, all are private schools:

Institution	Location (Note: All cities are located in the State of California.)	Founded	Affiliation	Enrollment	Nickname	Joined (Note: Represents the calendar year when fall sports competition begins.)	Colors	Football
Azusa Pacific University	Azusa	1899	Evangelical	7,133	Cougars	2026		Yes
California Institute of Technology (Caltech)	Pasadena	1891	Nonsectarian	2,086 (Note: Including graduate students.)	Beavers	1915; 1938 (Note: Caltech left the SCIAC after the 1933–34 school year, before rejoining in the 1938–39 school year.)		No
California Lutheran University	Thousand Oaks	1959	Lutheran ELCA	3,298	Kingsmen & Regals	1991		Yes
Chapman University	Orange	1861	DoC & UCC	10,001	Panthers	1950; 2011 (Note: Chapman left the SCIAC after the 1951–52 school year, before rejoining in the 2011–12 school year.)		Yes
Claremont-Mudd-Scripps —Claremont McKenna College —Harvey Mudd College —Scripps College	Claremont	1946; 1955; 1926	Nonsectarian	1,328; 746; 878	Stags & Athenas	1976; 1947; 1958; 1976		Yes
University of La Verne	La Verne	1891	Nonsectarian (Note: Historically affiliated with the Brethren.)	1,685	Leopards	1926; 1971 (Note: La Verne left the SCIAC after the 1937–38 school year, before rejoining in the 1971–72 school year.)		Yes
Occidental College	Los Angeles	1887	Nonsectarian (Note: Historically affiliated with the Presbyterian Church in the United States of America (not to be confused with the current Presbyterian Church (USA)).)	1,839	Tigers	1915		No
Pomona-Pitzer —Pomona College —Pitzer College	Claremont	1887 1963	Nonsectarian	1,690 950	Sagehens	1971; 1915; 1938 (Note: Pomona left the SCIAC after the 1933–34 school year, before rejoining in the 1938–39 school year.); 1971		Yes
University of Redlands	Redlands	1907	Nonsectarian (Note: Historically affiliated with the American Baptist Churches.)	4,400	Bulldogs	1915		Yes
Whittier College	Whittier	1887	Secular (Note: Historically affiliated with the Quakers.)	1,540	Poets	1915; 1946 (Note: Whittier left the SCIAC after the 1942–43 school year, before rejoining in the 1946–47 school year.)		Yes

=== Former member schools ===
The SCIAC had three former full members; all were public schools:

Institution	Location (Note: All cities were located in the State of California.)	Founded	Affiliation	Enrollment	Nickname	Joined (Note: Represents the calendar year when fall sports competition begins.)	Left (Note: Represents the calendar year when spring sports competition ends.)	Current conference
University of California, Los Angeles (UCLA)	Los Angeles	1919	Public (Note: Part of the University of California System.)	39,271	Bruins	1920	1927	Big Ten (B1G) (Note: Currently an NCAA Division I athletic conference.)
San Diego State University	San Diego	1897	Public (Note: Part of the California State University System.)	31,303	Aztecs	1926	1939	Pac-12
University of California, Santa Barbara (UC Santa Barbara, UCSB)	Santa Barbara	1891	Public	22,850	Gauchos	1931	1938	Big West (BWC)

=== Membership timeline ===
Full member (all sports) Full member (non-football) Associate member (football) Associate member (sport)

== All-sports champions ==
Year	Overall Champion
2025–26	Claremont-Mudd-Scripps
2024–25	Claremont-Mudd-Scripps
2023–24	Claremont-Mudd-Scripps
2022–23	Claremont-Mudd-Scripps
2021–22	Pomona-Pitzer
2020–21	Not awarded due to COVID-19 pandemic
2019–20	Claremont-Mudd-Scripps
2018–19	Claremont-Mudd-Scripps
2017–18	Claremont-Mudd-Scripps
2016–17	Claremont-Mudd-Scripps
2015–16	Claremont-Mudd-Scripps
2014–15	Claremont-Mudd-Scripps
2013–14	Claremont-Mudd-Scripps
2012–13	Claremont-Mudd-Scripps
2011–12	Claremont-Mudd-Scripps
2010–11	Claremont-Mudd-Scripps
2009–10	Claremont-Mudd-Scripps
2008–09	Claremont-Mudd-Scripps
2007–08	Redlands
2006–07	Redlands
2005–06	Claremont-Mudd-Scripps
2004–05	Redlands
2003–04	Claremont-Mudd-Scripps
2002–03	Claremont-Mudd-Scripps
2001–02	Claremont-Mudd-Scripps
2000–01	Claremont-Mudd-Scripps
1999–2000	Claremont-Mudd-Scripps
1998–99	Claremont-Mudd-Scripps
1997–98	Claremont-Mudd-Scripps
1996–97	Claremont-Mudd-Scripps
1995–96	Claremont-Mudd-Scripps
1994–95	Claremont-Mudd-Scripps
1993–94	Claremont-Mudd-Scripps
1992–93	Claremont-Mudd-Scripps
1991–92	Claremont-Mudd-Scripps
1990–91	Pomona-Pitzer
1989–90	Claremont-Mudd-Scripps
1988–89	Claremont-Mudd-Scripps
1987–88	Claremont-Mudd-Scripps
1986–87	Claremont-Mudd-Scripps
1985–86	Claremont-Mudd-Scripps
1984–85	Occidental
1983–84	Occidental
1982–83	Claremont-Mudd-Scripps
1981–82	Pomona-Pitzer
1980–81	Pomona-Pitzer
1979–80	Pomona-Pitzer
1978–79	Occidental
1977–78	Pomona-Pitzer
1976–77	Pomona-Pitzer
1975–76	Claremont-Mudd-Scripps
1974–75	Claremont-Mudd-Scripps
1973–74	Redlands
1972–73	Claremont-Mudd-Scripps

School	Number of titles
Claremont-Mudd-Scripps	39
Pomona-Pitzer	7
Redlands	4
Occidental	3

== Sports ==
The SCIAC sponsors intercollegiate athletic competition in the following sports:

Conference sports
Sport	Men's	Women's
Baseball	Yes	No
Basketball	Yes	Yes
Cross country	Yes	Yes
Football	Yes	No
Golf	Yes	Yes
Lacrosse	No	Yes
Soccer	Yes	Yes
Softball	No	Yes
Swimming & Diving	Yes	Yes
Tennis	Yes	Yes
Track and field	Yes	Yes
Volleyball	No	Yes
Water Polo	Yes	Yes

== See also ==
- List of Southern California Intercollegiate Athletic Conference football standings
