= 1923 Rose Bowl =

American college football game

- 9th Rose Bowl Game
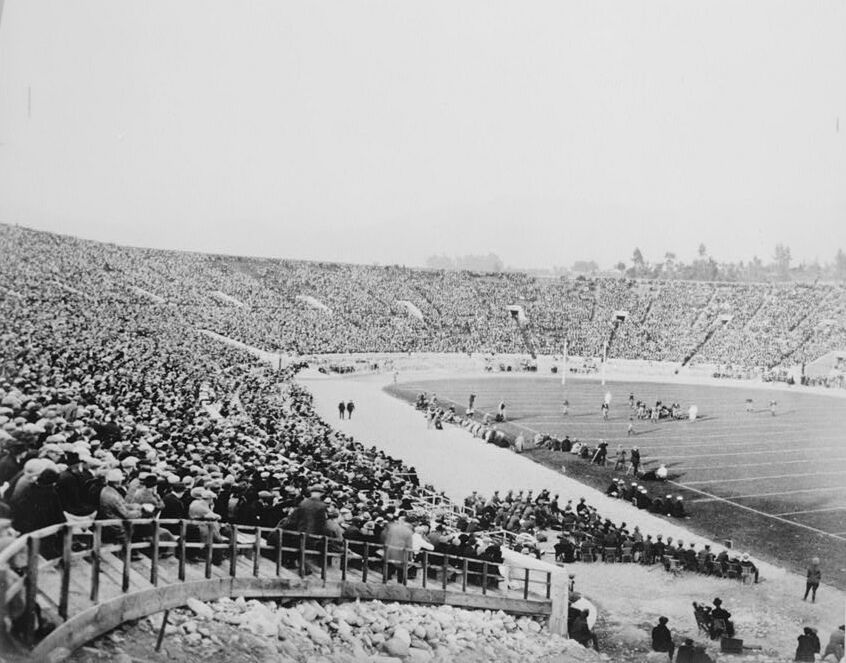
| Penn State Nittany Lions | USC Trojans |
| (6–3–1) | (9–1) |
| Independent | PCC |
| 3 | 14 |
| Head coach: Hugo Bezdek | Head coach: Gus Henderson |
| | 1 | 2 | 3 | 4 | Total |
|---|---|---|---|---|---|
| Penn State | 3 | 0 | 0 | 0 | 3 |
| USC | 0 | 7 | 7 | 0 | 14 |
- Date: January 1, 1923
- Season: 1922
- Stadium: Rose Bowl Stadium (First Rose Bowl game in the stadium)
- Location: Pasadena, California
- MVP: Leo Calland (G USC)
- National anthem: Spirit of Troy
- Halftime show: Spirit of Troy
- Attendance: 43,000

The 1923 Rose Bowl, played on January 1, 1923, was an American football bowl game. It was the 9th Rose Bowl Game. The USC Trojans defeated the Penn State Nittany Lions 14–3. Leo Calland, a USC guard, was named the Rose Bowl Player of the Game when the award was created in 1953 and selections were made retroactively. It was the first bowl game appearance for both the University of Southern California and Pennsylvania State University football teams. It was also the first Tournament of Roses football game held in the newly constructed Rose Bowl Stadium, although other games had been played in it prior to this one.

== Stadium ==
The game now known as the Rose Bowl Game was played at Tournament Park until 1922 when it was known as the "Tournament East-West football game". Organizers of the Tournament of Roses realized that the temporary stands were inadequate for a crowd of 40,000+, and sought to build a better, permanent stadium.

The Rose Bowl was designed by architect Myron Hunt in 1921. His design, as well as the name for the stadium, was influenced by the Yale Bowl. The Arroyo Seco (translation "dry stream") was selected as the location for the stadium. The Rose Bowl was under construction from 1921 to 1922.

A number of regular season games were played there before the actual Tournament of Roses football game to try out the new stadium. USC had actually already played three games in the new stadium: USC lost to California in the first game in the stadium on October 28, 1922, and defeated Idaho and Washington State in the new stadium to close out their season. The Olympic Club also played a football game there. The stadium was dedicated officially on January 1, 1923.

== Teams ==
=== Penn State Nittany Lions ===
In the 1921 season, Penn State was 8–2–0 with wins over Navy, Georgia Tech, and Washington. In the 1922 season the Lions opened with wins over St. Bonaventure, William and Mary, Gettysburg, Lebanon Valley. By mid October they were viewed as a likely candidate to be invited to play in the Rose Bowl. On October 21, the Nittany Lions got their fifth straight season win against Middlebury for their homecoming game. Penn State was officially extended an invitation by the Tournament committee, and they accepted.

The Lions tied Syracuse 0–0 at the Polo Grounds in New York city in front of their largest seasonal crowd to date, 25,000. Then the Nittany Lions lost to Navy 0–14 in Washington D.C., breaking a 30-game undefeated streak on November 3. Despite the loss, the Tournament selection committee re-affirmed its choice. They beat Carnegie Tech, but the Tournament committee still faced controversy. They re-affirmed their decision again. The Nittany Lions then lost to in-state rivals Pennsylvania and Pittsburgh.

=== USC Trojans ===
The Trojans opened 5–0 to start the season. This was the first season of competition in the Pacific Coast Conference for the USC Trojans. The first PCC conference game was against California. The first game in the Rose Bowl stadium was the regular season contest on October 28, 1922, when Cal defeated USC 12–0. This was the only loss for USC, and California finished the season undefeated. Cal declined the invitation to the 1923 Rose Bowl game by vote of the associated students. This made the deciding games to be whether Cal would defeat Washington by more than 12, and whether USC would defeat Stanford on November 11. USC went on to beat Occidental and Stanford. The Trojans then played Idaho, and Washington State in the new Rose Bowl stadium and defeated both. The Trojans actually finished fourth in the PCC behind Cal, Oregon, and Washington. The PCC committee held a mail vote. The Trojans were given the berth on the basis of the defeat of Washington State and the tie between Washington and Oregon on Thanksgiving Day. The Trojans received six of eight conference votes.

== Game summary ==
The 29-member Penn State traveling party left State College, Pennsylvania, by train on December 19. They stopped in Chicago and the Grand Canyon. They arrived in Pasadena, California, on December 24. The Nittany Lions worked out in the Rose Bowl stadium, alternating with the Trojans. Lions coach Bezdek was noted for changing their play style frequently.

The morning of the game on January 1, the team watched the Tournament of Roses Parade. The Lions left in several taxi cabs at 11 a.m. for the drive to the Rose Bowl, but as the 2:15 p.m. kickoff approached, the team was delayed by post-parade traffic. Only after the cab drivers drove over the lawns of local residents did the Penn State team finally reach the Rose Bowl stadium. When the team arrived, they found kickoff already had been delayed by 10 minutes. Penn State coach Hugo Bezdek and USC coach Gus Henderson almost came to blows as Bezdek successfully lobbied game officials for additional warmup time. The game finally started an hour late and ended in moonlight, with sportswriters lighting matches in order to finish their stories.

Penn State scored first on a 20-yard drop-kick field goal by Mike Palm. Roy "Bullet" Baker rushed for 123 yards and one touchdown for the Trojans. The Lions were held to five first downs and 104 yards.

=== Scoring ===
==== First Quarter ====
- Penn State – Field Goal, Palm

==== Second Quarter ====
- USC – Touchdown Campbell, PAT Hawkins

==== Third Quarter ====
- USC – Touchdown Baker, PAT Hawkins

==== Fourth Quarter ====
no score

== Aftermath ==
The nearby Los Angeles Memorial Coliseum also was under construction during this time and would be completed in May 1923. It would become the home stadium for both USC and UCLA for decades until UCLA moved to the Rose Bowl for its home games in 1982.

Penn State's share of the proceeds, $21,349.64, was directed toward the $2 million Emergency Building Fund and in particular the construction of Varsity Hall (now Irvin Hall) on campus.

The game was the first USC game attended by Giles Pellerin, at the time a high school student. Pellerin, who became known as the "Super Fan", would go on to attend 797 consecutive USC football games over a period of 73 years until his death at age 91 just outside the same stadium in 1998.

== Bibliography ==
- Penn State football history (PDF copy available at gopsusports.cstv.com Archived 2009-03-02 at the Wayback Machine)
- USC Trojans football media guide (PDF copy available at www.usctrojans.com)
- Bezilla, Michael (1986), Penn State: An Illustrated History, University Park, Pennsylvania: Pennsylvania State University Press, ISBN 0-271-00392-8
