= 1922 Washington State Cougars football team =

American college football season

1922 Washington State Cougars football
- Conference: Northwest Conference, Pacific Coast Conference
- Record: 2–5 (1–3 Northwest, 1–5 PCC)
- Head coach: Gus Welch (4th season)
- Captain: Ford Dunton
- Home stadium: Rogers Field

1922 Northwest Conference football standings
	Conf.					Overall
Team	W		L		T	W		L		T
Oregon +	5	–	0	–	1	6	–	1	–	1
Washington +	4	–	0	–	1	6	–	1	–	1
Whitman	2	–	2	–	0	2	–	4	–	1
Idaho	2	–	3	–	0	3	–	5	–	0
Oregon Agricultural	1	–	2	–	0	3	–	4	–	0
Washington State	1	–	3	–	0	2	–	5	–	0
Willamette	0	–	2	–	0	3	–	4	–	0
Montana	0	–	3	–	0	3	–	4	–	0
+ – Conference co-champions

1922 Pacific Coast Conference football standings
	Conf.					Overall
Team	W		L		T	W		L		T
California $	4	–	0	–	0	9	–	0	–	0
Oregon	3	–	0	–	1	6	–	1	–	1
Washington	4	–	1	–	1	6	–	1	–	1
USC ^	3	–	1	–	0	10	–	1	–	0
Oregon Agricultural	1	–	3	–	0	3	–	4	–	0
Stanford	1	–	3	–	0	4	–	5	–	0
Washington State	1	–	5	–	0	2	–	5	–	0
Idaho	0	–	4	–	0	3	–	5	–	0
$ – Conference champion; ^ Selected as Rose Bowl representative

The 1922 Washington State Cougars football team represented Washington State College—now known as Washington State University—as a member of the Northwest Conference and the Pacific Coast Conference (PCC) during the 1922 college football season. In their fourth and final season under head coach Gus Welch, the Cougars compiled an overall record of 2–5 and were outscored by their opponents by a combined total of 163 to 44. Washington State had a record of 1–3 in Northwest Conference play, placing sixth, and 1–5 against PCC opponents, finishing seventh.

Washington State opened the season with a 10–7 victory over Gus Dorais' Gonzaga team with the victory being sealed on a last-minute field goal by quarterback Vernard Hickey. The team followed with an 18–9 victory over Idaho in a game played in Moscow. Washington State scored two touchdowns in the fourth quarter, including an interception by Hickey returned 20 yards for a touchdown, to secure the victory. After winning its first two games, the team failed to win another game, losing to Washington (13–16), co-national champion California (0–61), Oregon (0–13), Oregon Agricultural (0–16), and USC (3–41).

Ford Dunton, a tackle from Spokane, was unanimously chosen by his teammates as the team captain. At the end of the 1922 season, Dunton was selected by the United Press as a first-team player on the 1922 All-Pacific Coast football team.

On December 23, 1922, Gus Welch resigned his position after four years as the team's head coach. Criticism of the team's record was reported to be a factor for the resignation.

== Schedule ==
Date	Opponent	Site	Result	Attendance	Source
October 14	at Gonzaga*	Gonzaga Stadium; Spokane, WA	W 10–7	6,000	
October 20	at Idaho	MacLean Field; Moscow, ID (rivalry)	W 18–9	4,000	
October 28	Washington	Rogers Field; Pullman, WA	L 13–16	10,000	
November 4	at California	California Field; Berkeley, CA	L 0–61	20,000	
November 11	at Oregon	Hayward Field; Eugene, OR	L 0–13	12,000	
November 25	at Oregon Agricultural	Multnomah Field; Portland, OR	L 0–16	6,000	
November 30	vs. USC	Tournament of Roses Stadium; Pasadena, CA	L 3–41	11,000	
*Non-conference game
