= Annice =

Annice is a given name. Notable people with the name include:

- Annice (slave) (died 1828), first female slave executed in Missouri
- Annice Calland (1879–1943), American writer
- Annice Sidwells (1902–2001), English singer
- Annice M. Wagner (born 1937), Chief Judge of the District of Columbia Court of Appeals
