= 1922 Montana Grizzlies football team =

American college football season

1922 Montana Grizzlies football
- Conference: Northwest Conference
- Record: 3–4 (0–3 Northwest)
- Head coach: John W. Stewart (1st season)
- Home stadium: Dornblaser Field

1922 Northwest Conference football standings
	Conf.					Overall
Team	W		L		T	W		L		T
Oregon +	5	–	0	–	1	6	–	1	–	1
Washington +	4	–	0	–	1	6	–	1	–	1
Whitman	2	–	2	–	0	2	–	4	–	1
Idaho	2	–	3	–	0	3	–	5	–	0
Oregon Agricultural	1	–	2	–	0	3	–	4	–	0
Washington State	1	–	3	–	0	2	–	5	–	0
Willamette	0	–	2	–	0	3	–	4	–	0
Montana	0	–	3	–	0	3	–	4	–	0
+ – Conference co-champions

The 1922 Montana Grizzlies football team represented the University of Montana as a member of the Northwest Conference during the 1922 college football season. Led by first-year head coach John W. Stewart, the Grizzlies compiled an overall record of 3–4 with a mark of 0–3 in conference play, tying for seventh place in the Northwest Conference.

== Schedule ==
Date	Opponent	Site	Result	Attendance	Source
October 7	at Washington	Husky Stadium; Seattle, WA	L 0–26	9,214	
October 13	Montana Wesleyan*	Dornblaser Field; Missoula, MT	W 37–0		
October 21	Idaho Technical*	Dornblaser Field; Missoula, MT	W 15–12		
October 28	at Gonzaga*	Gonzaga Stadium; Spokane, WA	L 6–37		
November 11	Montana State*	Dornblaser Field; Missoula, MT (rivalry)	W 7–6		
November 25	at Whitman	Ankeny Field; Walla Walla, WA	L 0–13		
November 30	Idaho	Dornblaser Field; Missoula, MT (rivalry)	L 0–39		
*Non-conference game
