= 1922 California Golden Bears football team =

American college football season

1922 California Golden Bears football

National champion (Billingsley MOV, Houlgate) Co-national champion (NCF, Sagarin) PCC champion
- Conference: Pacific Coast Conference
- Record: 9–0 (4–0 PCC)
- Head coach: Andy Smith (7th season)
- Offensive scheme: Short-punt
- Captain: Charles F. Erb
- Home stadium: California Field

Uniform
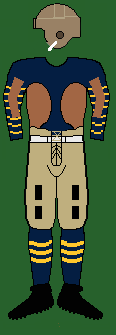

1922 Pacific Coast Conference football standings
	Conf.					Overall
Team	W		L		T	W		L		T
California $	4	–	0	–	0	9	–	0	–	0
Oregon	3	–	0	–	1	6	–	1	–	1
Washington	4	–	1	–	1	6	–	1	–	1
USC ^	3	–	1	–	0	10	–	1	–	0
Oregon Agricultural	1	–	3	–	0	3	–	4	–	0
Stanford	1	–	3	–	0	4	–	5	–	0
Washington State	1	–	5	–	0	2	–	5	–	0
Idaho	0	–	4	–	0	3	–	5	–	0
$ – Conference champion; ^ Selected as Rose Bowl representative

The 1922 California Golden Bears football team was an American football team that represented the University of California, Berkeley in the Pacific Coast Conference (PCC) during the 1922 college football season. In their seventh year under head coach Andy Smith, the team compiled a 9–0 record (4–0 against PCC opponents), won the PCC championship, and outscored its opponents by a combined total of 398 to 34. The 398 points scored led major college football.

There was no contemporaneous system in 1921 for determining a national champion. However, California was retroactively named as the national champion for 1922 by the Billingsley Report (using its alternative "margin of victory" methodology) and Houlgate System, and as a co-national champion by the National Championship Foundation and Jeff Sagarin.

California end Harold "Brick" Muller was a consensus first-team selection to the 1922 All-America college football team. Additionally, Cal took eight of eleven spots on the United Press' 1922 All-Pacific Coast football team: quarterback Charles F. Erb; halfback Donald Nichols; fullback Jesse B. Morrison; ends Harold Muller and Robert A. Berkey; tackle Stewart A. Beam; and guards Webster V. Clark and Leo Calland. A ninth Cal player, center Prink Callison, was named to the All-Pacific Coast team by George Bertz.

== Schedule ==
Date	Opponent	Site	Result	Attendance	Source
September 30	Santa Clara*	California Field; Berkeley, CA	W 45–14		
October 7	Mare Island Marines*	California Field; Berkeley, CA	W 80–0		
October 14	Saint Mary's*	California Field; Berkeley, CA	W 41–0		
October 21	Olympic Club*	California Field; Berkeley, CA	W 25–0	30,000	
October 28	at USC	Tournament of Roses Stadium; Pasadena, CA	W 12–0	40,000	
November 4	Washington State	California Field; Berkeley, CA	W 61–0		
November 11	at Washington	University of Washington Stadium; Seattle, WA	W 45–7	30,075	
November 18	Nevada	California Field; Berkeley, CA	W 61–13		
November 25	at Stanford	Stanford Stadium; Stanford, CA (Big Game)	W 28–0		
*Non-conference game; Source:
