= Donald Nichols (American football) =

American football player and attorney (1901–1978)

Profile
- Position: Halfback

Personal information
- Born: October 17, 1901; California, U.S.
- Died: March 14, 1978 (aged 76); Orange County, California, U.S.

Career information
- High school: Pomona
- College: California (1921–1923)

Awards and highlights
- Billy Evans National Honor Roll (1922); All-American (1922); 2× First-team All-Pacific Coast (1922, 1923); 3× National champion (1921, 1922, 1923)

Donald Penfield Nichols (October 17, 1901 – March 14, 1978) was an American college football player and attorney from Pomona, California.

== Early life ==
Nichols was born in California on October 17, 1901 to Allen P. Nichols and Elizabeth Adgate. He attended Pomona high school.

== University of California, Berkeley ==
Nichols was a prominent running back for Andy Smith's California Golden Bears. He was twice selected All-Pacific Coast, and made Billy Evans's "National Honor Roll" in 1922. Nichols was the star of the 45–7 victory over Washington. He was elected captain of the 1923 team as well as the representative of his class to the executive board. Nichols was one of the players who left with coach Smith on a scouting trip to Stanford in Palo Alto as the Bears were tied by Nevada.
