= 1922 Idaho Vandals football team =

American college football season

1922 Idaho Vandals football
- Conference: Northwest Conference, Pacific Coast Conference
- Record: 3–5 (2–3 Northwest, 0–4 PCC)
- Head coach: Robert L. Mathews (1st season)
- Home stadium: MacLean Field

1922 Northwest Conference football standings
	Conf.					Overall
Team	W		L		T	W		L		T
Oregon +	5	–	0	–	1	6	–	1	–	1
Washington +	4	–	0	–	1	6	–	1	–	1
Whitman	2	–	2	–	0	2	–	4	–	1
Idaho	2	–	3	–	0	3	–	5	–	0
Oregon Agricultural	1	–	2	–	0	3	–	4	–	0
Washington State	1	–	3	–	0	2	–	5	–	0
Willamette	0	–	2	–	0	3	–	4	–	0
Montana	0	–	3	–	0	3	–	4	–	0
+ – Conference co-champions

1922 Pacific Coast Conference football standings
	Conf.					Overall
Team	W		L		T	W		L		T
California $	4	–	0	–	0	9	–	0	–	0
Oregon	3	–	0	–	1	6	–	1	–	1
Washington	4	–	1	–	1	6	–	1	–	1
USC ^	3	–	1	–	0	10	–	1	–	0
Oregon Agricultural	1	–	3	–	0	3	–	4	–	0
Stanford	1	–	3	–	0	4	–	5	–	0
Washington State	1	–	5	–	0	2	–	5	–	0
Idaho	0	–	4	–	0	3	–	5	–	0
$ – Conference champion; ^ Selected as Rose Bowl representative

The 1922 Idaho Vandals football team represented the University of Idaho as a member of the Northwest Conference and the Pacific Coast Conference (PCC) during the 1922 college football season. Led by first-year head coach Robert L. Mathews, the Vandals compiled an overall record of 3–5. Idaho had a record of 2–3 in Northwest Conference play, placing fourth, and 0–4 against PCC opponents, finishing last out of eight teams. The team played only one home game, on campus, at MacLean Field in Moscow, Idaho.

The Vandals dropped an eighth consecutive game to Washington State in the Battle of the Palouse, but it was the only loss to the Cougars under Mathews. Idaho won the next three meetings, their only three-peat in the rivalry series.

== Schedule ==
Date	Opponent	Site	Result	Attendance	Source
October 7	at Whitman	Ankeny Field; Walla Walla, WA	W 3–0		
October 14	at Washington	Husky Stadium; Seattle, WA	L 0–2	10,096	
October 20	Washington State^{†}	MacLean Field; Moscow, ID (rivalry)	L 9–18	4,000	
October 28	vs. Oregon	Multnomah Field; Portland, OR	L 0–3		
November 11	vs. Utah*	Public School Field; Boise, ID	W 16–0		
November 18	at USC	Tournament of Roses Stadium; Pasadena, CA	L 0–14	12,500	
November 25	at Gonzaga*	Gonzaga Stadium; Spokane, WA	L 7–14		
November 30	at Montana	Dornblaser Field; Missoula, MT (rivalry)	W 39–0		
*Non-conference game; ^{†}Homecoming
