= 1922 Willamette Bearcats football team =

American college football season

1922 Willamette Bearcats football
- Conference: Northwest Conference
- Record: 3–4 (0–2 Northwest)
- Head coach: Roy Bohler (2nd season)
- Home stadium: Sweetland Field

1922 Northwest Conference football standings
	Conf.					Overall
Team	W		L		T	W		L		T
Oregon +	5	–	0	–	1	6	–	1	–	1
Washington +	4	–	0	–	1	6	–	1	–	1
Whitman	2	–	2	–	0	2	–	4	–	1
Idaho	2	–	3	–	0	3	–	5	–	0
Oregon Agricultural	1	–	2	–	0	3	–	4	–	0
Washington State	1	–	3	–	0	2	–	5	–	0
Willamette	0	–	2	–	0	3	–	4	–	0
Montana	0	–	3	–	0	3	–	4	–	0
+ – Conference co-champions

The 1922 Willamette Bearcats football team represented Willamette University as a member of the Northwest Conference during the 1922 college football season. Under second-year head coach Roy Bohler, the Bearcats compiled an overall record of 3–4 with a mark of 0–2 in conference play, and finished tied for seventh in the Northwest Conference.

== Schedule ==
Date	Opponent	Site	Result	Source
September 30	Willamette Alumni*	Sweetland Field; Salem, OR	W 12–7	
October 7	at Oregon	Hayward Field; Eugene, OR	L 0–37	
October 21	Linfield*	Sweetland Field; Salem, OR	W 26–0	
October 28	Chemawa*	Sweetland Field; Salem, OR	W 56–6	
November 4	at Whitman	Ankeny Field; Walla Walla, WA	L 7–9	
November 17	at Pacific (OR)*	McCredy Field; Forest Grove, OR	L 20–6	
November 30	Puget Sound*	Sweetland Field; Salem, OR	L 0–8	
*Non-conference game
