= Leo Calland =

American football and basketball player and coach (1901–1984)

- Calland, c. 1925

Biographical details
- Born: February 24, 1901; Ohio, U.S.
- Died: March 17, 1984 (aged 83); La Jolla, California, U.S.

Playing career

Football
- 1920–1922: USC
- Position: Guard (football)

Coaching career (HC unless noted)

Football
- 1924: USC (assistant)
- 1925–1926: Whittier
- 1927–1928: USC (assistant)
- 1929–1934: Idaho
- 1935–1941: San Diego State

Basketball
- 1927–1929: USC

Baseball
- 1926: Whittier

Administrative career (AD unless noted)
- 1929–1934: Idaho

Head coaching record
- Overall: 62–61–5 (football); 38–10 (basketball)

Accomplishments and honors

Championships
- Football; 2 SCC (1936–1937); Basketball; 1 PCC (1928)

Awards
- First-team All-PCC (1922)
- Military career
- Allegiance: United States
- Branch: United States Navy
- Service years: 1942–1945
- Rank: Commander
- Unit: Training
- Conflicts: World War II

Leo Blakely Calland (February 24, 1901 – March 17, 1984) was an American college football and college basketball player and coach who later became a San Diego city parks administrator. He was the head football coach at Whittier College (1925–1926), the University of Idaho (1929–1934), and San Diego State College (1935–1941), compiling a career college football head coaching record record of 62–61–5. For two seasons, Calland was also the head basketball coach at the University of Southern California (USC), his alma mater, tallying a mark of 38–10 from 1927 to 1929.

== Early years ==
Born in Ohio, the son of Cory Lee Calland and poet Annice Calland, Calland moved with his family as a child to western Washington, where he attended school in a log cabin on Lopez Island, in the San Juan Islands near the Strait of Juan de Fuca, where all of the other students were Native Americans. He was an outstanding athlete at Broadway High School in Seattle, where he played football under coach Gus Henderson.

Henderson became the head football coach at USC in Los Angeles in 1919, and Calland followed him south. He lettered as a guard for three seasons (1920–1922) and as a senior was named both team captain and most inspirational player on USC's first Rose Bowl team. Calland was named player of the game in the Trojans' 14–3 victory over Penn State on New Year's Day, the first bowl game in the current namesake stadium, and also lettered in basketball at USC.

== Coaching career ==
After graduating from USC in 1923, Calland became an assistant coach there, leading the Trojan freshman squads in football, basketball, and baseball. He left in 1925 to lead nearby Whittier College for two seasons in multiple sports, then returned to USC as head basketball coach in 1927. Calland posted a 38–10 record over two seasons, winning the Pacific Coast Conference title in his first year with a 22–4 (.846) mark. His .792 career winning percentage remains the highest by a USC basketball coach. In these two seasons he was also an assistant football coach.

In February 1929, Calland was named head football coach and athletic director at the University of Idaho in Moscow, also in the PCC. He compiled a 21–30 (.412) record in six seasons on the Palouse, but his overmatched Vandals were just 5–25 (.167) in conference play, defeating only Montana. He resigned after the 1934 season, then returned to southern California at San Diego State College, where he posted a 34–22–4 (.600) record in seven seasons. His Aztecs won consecutive SCIAC championships (1936, 1937), with players including John D. Butler, a future mayor of San Diego (1951–1955).

== Military career and later life ==
In his early forties, Calland entered the U.S. Navy during World War II, and served as a recreation officer at the 11th Naval District in San Diego. In 1945, he became director of San Diego's Department of Parks and Recreation; during his fifteen years in the post, he oversaw the development of Mission Bay Park and Torrey Pines Golf Course. Calland became managing director of the San Diego Hall of Champions in 1960 and remained in that position until retiring in 1977, and was himself inducted into the Hall in 1974.

== Death ==
Calland died at age 83 at the Veterans Administration Hospital in La Jolla. He was survived by his wife Sarah, two daughters and a son, and was buried in Fairhaven Cemetery in Santa Ana.

== Head coaching record ==
=== Football ===
Year	Team	Overall	Conference	Standing	Bowl/playoffs
Whittier Poets (Southern California Intercollegiate Athletic Conference) (1925–1926)
1925	Whittier	3–5	2–2	3rd	
1926	Whittier	4–4–1	4–2–1	3rd	
Whittier:		7–9–1	6–4–1		
Idaho Vandals (Pacific Coast Conference) (1929–1934)
1929	Idaho	4–5	1–4	T–7th	
1930	Idaho	4–7	0–5	10th	
1931	Idaho	3–4	1–4	8th	
1932	Idaho	3–5	1–4	T–8th	
1933	Idaho	4–4	1–4	9th	
1934	Idaho	3–5	1–4	8th	
Idaho:		21–30	5–25		
San Diego State Aztecs (Southern California Conference) (1935–1938)
1935	San Diego State	3–4–1	2–2–1	T–3rd	
1936	San Diego State	6–1–1	5–0	1st	
1937	San Diego State	7–1	4–1	1st	
1938	San Diego State	5–2–1	2–1–1	3rd	
San Diego State Aztecs (California Collegiate Athletic Association) (1939–1941)
1939	San Diego State	2–7	0–2	4th	
1940	San Diego State	5–3–1	1–1–1	T–2nd	
1941	San Diego State	6–4	0–3	4th	
San Diego State:		34–22–4	14–10–3		
Total:		62–61–5			
National championship Conference title Conference division title or championship game berth
