= 1922 Oregon Agricultural Aggies football team =

American college football season

1922 Oregon Agricultural Aggies football
- Head coach Dick Rutherford
- Conference: Northwest Conference, Pacific Coast Conference
- Record: 3–4 (1–2 Northwest, 1–3 PCC)
- Head coach: Dick Rutherford (3rd season)
- Captain: Percy Locey
- Home stadium: Bell Field

1922 Northwest Conference football standings
	Conf.					Overall
Team	W		L		T	W		L		T
Oregon +	5	–	0	–	1	6	–	1	–	1
Washington +	4	–	0	–	1	6	–	1	–	1
Whitman	2	–	2	–	0	2	–	4	–	1
Idaho	2	–	3	–	0	3	–	5	–	0
Oregon Agricultural	1	–	2	–	0	3	–	4	–	0
Washington State	1	–	3	–	0	2	–	5	–	0
Willamette	0	–	2	–	0	3	–	4	–	0
Montana	0	–	3	–	0	3	–	4	–	0
+ – Conference co-champions

1922 Pacific Coast Conference football standings
	Conf.					Overall
Team	W		L		T	W		L		T
California $	4	–	0	–	0	9	–	0	–	0
Oregon	3	–	0	–	1	6	–	1	–	1
Washington	4	–	1	–	1	6	–	1	–	1
USC ^	3	–	1	–	0	10	–	1	–	0
Oregon Agricultural	1	–	3	–	0	3	–	4	–	0
Stanford	1	–	3	–	0	4	–	5	–	0
Washington State	1	–	5	–	0	2	–	5	–	0
Idaho	0	–	4	–	0	3	–	5	–	0
$ – Conference champion; ^ Selected as Rose Bowl representative

Percy Locey, elected captain of the 1922 OAC Beavers team

The 1922 Oregon Agricultural Aggies football team represented Oregon Agricultural College (OAC)—now known as Oregon State University—as a member of the Northwest Conference and the Pacific Coast Conference (PCC) during the 1922 college football season. In their third season under head coach Dick Rutherford, the Aggies compiled an overall record of 3–4 and outscored their opponents 44 to 42. Oregon Agricultural had a record of 1–2 in Northwest Conference play, placing fifth, and 1–3 against PCC opponents, tying for fifth place. Fullback Gap Powell was the team captain. The team played home games on campus, at Bell Field in Corvallis, Oregon.

== Schedule ==
Date	Opponent	Site	Result	Attendance	Source
October 7	O.A.C. alumni*	Bell Field; Corvallis, OR	W 22–6		
October 15	Pacific (OR)*	Bell Field; Corvallis, OR	W 3–0		
October 21	at Washington	Husky Stadium; Seattle, WA	L 3–14	11,470	
October 28	Stanford	Bell Field; Corvallis, OR	L 0–6		
November 4	at Multnomah Athletic Club*	Multnomah Field; Portland, OR	L 0–6		
November 18	Oregon	Bell Field; Corvallis, OR (rivalry)	L 0–10	13,000+	
November 25	Washington State	Multnomah Field; Portland, OR	W 16–0		
*Non-conference game

.
