= Charles F. Erb =

American football player and coach (1902–1952)

- Gem of the Mountains, 1927 Idaho yearbook

Biographical details
- Born: December 8, 1902
- Died: March 7, 1952 (aged 49); North Hollywood, California, U.S.

Playing career
- 1920–1922: California
- Position: Quarterback

Coaching career (HC unless noted)
- 1924: Nevada
- 1926–1928: Idaho
- 1935–1937: Humboldt State

Administrative career (AD unless noted)
- 1926–1928: Idaho

Head coaching record
- Overall: 28–19–7

Accomplishments and honors

Championships
- 1 PCC (1928)

Awards
- 3× First-team All-Pacific Coast (1920, 1921, 1922)

Charles Freeman Erb Jr. (December 8, 1902 – March 7, 1952) was an American college football player and coach. He served as the head football coach at the University of Nevada, Reno in 1924, the University of Idaho from 1926 to 1928, and Humboldt State College from 1935 to 1937, compiling a career coaching record of 28–19–7.

== Playing career ==
At Manual Arts High School in Los Angeles, Erb was the California player of the year during the 1917 season as an end.

Erb played college football as a quarterback at California from 1920 through 1922, on the undefeated "Wonder Teams" led by head coach Andy Smith. The 1920 team won the Rose Bowl and the 1921 team tied in the 1922 Rose Bowl. The undefeated 1922 and 1923 teams did not play in the postseason.

== Coaching career ==
In 1924, he coached at Nevada, where he compiled a 3–4–1 record. He was hired at Idaho in May 1926 as head coach and director of athletics, where he compiled a 10–9–5 (.521) record in three seasons. His 1927 team contended for the title in the Pacific Coast Conference and were co-champions, but the 1928 team had a more difficult season, after which he submitted his resignation.

After Idaho, his career record stood at 13–13–6 in four seasons. From 1935 to 1937 he coached in California at Humboldt State, where he compiled a 15–6–1 record.

== Personal life ==
Erb's son, Charles "Boots" Erb (1925–2013), also played quarterback at California, under head coach Pappy Waldorf in the late 1940s. Boots saw action in the 1949 and 1950 Rose Bowls. The Erbs were the first father and son to quarterback in the Rose Bowl.

Erb died of a heart attack, suffered in his sleep during the night of March 7, 1952, at his home in North Hollywood, Los Angeles.

== Head coaching record ==
Year	Team	Overall	Conference	Standing	Bowl/playoffs
Nevada Wolf Pack (Independent) (1924)
1924	Nevada	3–4–1			
Nevada:		3–4–1			
Idaho Vandals (Pacific Coast Conference) (1926–1928)
1926	Idaho	3–4–1	1–4	T–6th	
1927	Idaho	4–1–3	2–0–2	T–1st	
1928	Idaho	3–4–1	2–3	T–6th	
Idaho:		10–9–5	5–7–2		
Humboldt State Lumberjacks (Independent) (1935–1937)
1935	Humboldt State	6–1–1			
1936	Humboldt State	5–3			
1937	Humboldt State	4–2			
Humboldt State:		15–6–1			
Total:		28–19–7			
National championship Conference title Conference division title or championship game berth
