= 1922 Stanford football team =

American college football season

1922 Stanford football
- Conference: Pacific Coast Conference
- Record: 4–5 (1–3 PCC)
- Head coach: Andrew Kerr (1st season)
- Offensive scheme: Double-wing
- Home stadium: Stanford Stadium

1922 Pacific Coast Conference football standings
	Conf.					Overall
Team	W		L		T	W		L		T
California $	4	–	0	–	0	9	–	0	–	0
Oregon	3	–	0	–	1	6	–	1	–	1
Washington	4	–	1	–	1	6	–	1	–	1
USC ^	3	–	1	–	0	10	–	1	–	0
Oregon Agricultural	1	–	3	–	0	3	–	4	–	0
Stanford	1	–	3	–	0	4	–	5	–	0
Washington State	1	–	5	–	0	2	–	5	–	0
Idaho	0	–	4	–	0	3	–	5	–	0
$ – Conference champion; ^ Selected as Rose Bowl representative

The 1922 Stanford football team represented Stanford University as a member of the Pacific Coast Conference (PCC) during the 1922 college football season. Led by first-year head coach Andrew Kerr, Stanford compiled an overall record of 4–5 with a mark of 1–3 in conference play, tying for fifth place in the PCC. For the first time, the team played all its home games at Stanford Stadium, the construction of which had been completed at the end of the previous season. With imminent construction of California Memorial Stadium in Berkeley, California, Stanford hosted the Big Game for the second straight year, the only time the game was played in successive seasons at Stanford Stadium.

== Schedule ==
Date	Opponent	Site	Result	Attendance	Source
October 7	Olympic Club*	Stanford Stadium; Stanford, CA	L 9–27	10,000	
October 14	Santa Clara*	Stanford Stadium; Stanford, CA	W 7–0		
October 21	Saint Mary's*	Stanford Stadium; Stanford, CA	W 9–0		
October 28	at Oregon Agricultural	Bell Field; Corvallis, OR	W 6–0		
November 4	Nevada*	Stanford Stadium; Stanford, CA	W 17–7		
November 11	USC	Stanford Stadium; Stanford, CA (rivalry)	L 0–6	15,000	
November 18	Washington	Stanford Stadium; Stanford, CA	L 8–12	6,000	
November 25	California	Stanford Stadium; Stanford, CA (Big Game)	L 0–28		
December 30	Pittsburgh*	Stanford Stadium; Stanford, CA	L 7–16	6,000	
*Non-conference game
