= 1922 Whitman Fighting Missionaries football team =

American college football season

1922 Whitman Fighting Missionaries football
- Conference: Northwest Conference
- Record: 2–4–1 (2–2 Northwest)
- Head coach: Vincent Borleske (7th season)
- Home stadium: Ankeny Field

1922 Northwest Conference football standings
	Conf.					Overall
Team	W		L		T	W		L		T
Oregon +	5	–	0	–	1	6	–	1	–	1
Washington +	4	–	0	–	1	6	–	1	–	1
Whitman	2	–	2	–	0	2	–	4	–	1
Idaho	2	–	3	–	0	3	–	5	–	0
Oregon Agricultural	1	–	2	–	0	3	–	4	–	0
Washington State	1	–	3	–	0	2	–	5	–	0
Willamette	0	–	2	–	0	3	–	4	–	0
Montana	0	–	3	–	0	3	–	4	–	0
+ – Conference co-champions

The 1922 Whitman Fighting Missionaries football team represented Whitman College as a member of the Northwest Conference during the 1922 college football season. Under seventh-year head coach Vincent Borleske, the Fighting Missionaries compiled an overall record of 2–4–1 with a mark of 2–2 in conference play, and finished third in the Northwest Conference. Whitman played home games at Ankeny Field in Walla Walla, Washington.

== Schedule ==
Date	Opponent	Site	Result	Attendance	Source
October 7	Idaho	Ankeny Field; Walla Walla, WA	L 0–3		
October 20	vs. Oregon	Round-Up Park; Pendleton, OR	L 3–6		
November 4	Willamette	Ankeny Field; Walla Walla, WA	W 9–7		
November 11	at Nevada*	Mackay Field; Reno, NV	L 7–35		
November 18	at Utah*	Cummings Field; Salt Lake City, UT	L 6–24		
November 25	Montana	Ankeny Field; Walla Walla, WA	W 13–0		
November 30	at College of Idaho*	Cleaver Field; Caldwell, ID	T 19–19	2,000	
*Non-conference game
