= 1922 Oregon Webfoots football team =

American college football season

1922 Oregon Webfoots football

Northwest Conference co-champion
- Conference: Northwest Conference, Pacific Coast Conference
- Record: 6–1–1 (5–0–1 Northwest, 3–0–1 PCC)
- Head coach: Charles A. Huntington (5th season)
- Captain: Arche Shields
- Home stadium: Hayward Field

1922 Northwest Conference football standings
	Conf.					Overall
Team	W		L		T	W		L		T
Oregon +	5	–	0	–	1	6	–	1	–	1
Washington +	4	–	0	–	1	6	–	1	–	1
Whitman	2	–	2	–	0	2	–	4	–	1
Idaho	2	–	3	–	0	3	–	5	–	0
Oregon Agricultural	1	–	2	–	0	3	–	4	–	0
Washington State	1	–	3	–	0	2	–	5	–	0
Willamette	0	–	2	–	0	3	–	4	–	0
Montana	0	–	3	–	0	3	–	4	–	0
+ – Conference co-champions

1922 Pacific Coast Conference football standings
	Conf.					Overall
Team	W		L		T	W		L		T
California $	4	–	0	–	0	9	–	0	–	0
Oregon	3	–	0	–	1	6	–	1	–	1
Washington	4	–	1	–	1	6	–	1	–	1
USC ^	3	–	1	–	0	10	–	1	–	0
Oregon Agricultural	1	–	3	–	0	3	–	4	–	0
Stanford	1	–	3	–	0	4	–	5	–	0
Washington State	1	–	5	–	0	2	–	5	–	0
Idaho	0	–	4	–	0	3	–	5	–	0
$ – Conference champion; ^ Selected as Rose Bowl representative

The 1922 Oregon Webfoots football team represented the University of Oregon as a member of the Northwest Conference and the Pacific Coast Conference (PCC) during the 1922 college football season. In their fifth season under head coach Charles A. Huntington, the Webfoots compiled an overall record of 6–1–1 record and outscored opponents 99 to 26. Oregon had a record of 5–0–1 in Northwest Conference play, sharing the conference title with Washington, and 3–0–1 against PCC opponents, finishing second. The team played home games on campus, at Hayward Field in Eugene, Oregon.

== Schedule ==
Date	Opponent	Site	Result	Attendance	Source
September 30	Pacific (OR)*	Hayward Field; Eugene, OR	W 27–0		
October 7	Willamette	Hayward Field; Eugene, OR	W 37–0		
October 14	Multnomah Athletic Club*	Hayward Field; Eugene, OR	L 0–20		
October 20	vs. Whitman	Round-Up Park; Pendleton, OR	W 6–3		
October 28	vs. Idaho	Multnomah Field; Portland, OR	W 3–0		
November 11	Washington State^{†}	Hayward Field; Eugene, OR	W 13–0	12,000	
November 18	at Oregon Agricultural	Bell Field; Corvallis, OR (rivalry)	W 10–0		
November 30	at Washington	University of Washington Stadium; Seattle, WA (rivalry)	T 3–3	12,000	
*Non-conference game; ^{†}Homecoming; Source:
