= Foley Center Library =

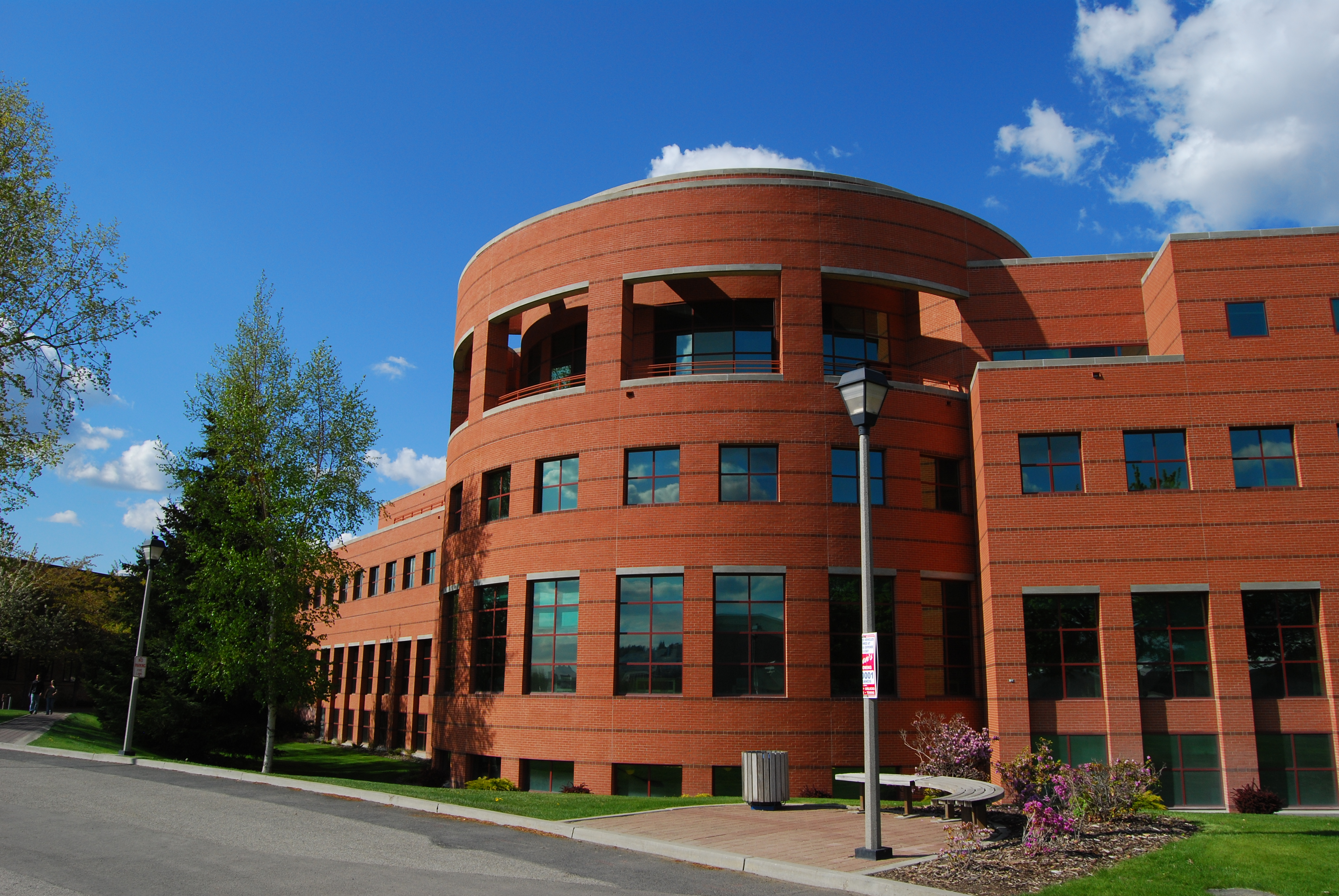
- Exterior from south in 2008
- 47°40′00″N 117°24′03″W
- Location: Gonzaga University; Spokane, Washington, United States
- Established: September 2, 1992 (33 years ago)

Collection
- Size: 300,000 books

Other information
- Website: Foley Center Library

The Ralph E. and Helen Higgins Foley Center Library is an academic library at Gonzaga University in Spokane, Washington.

== Background ==
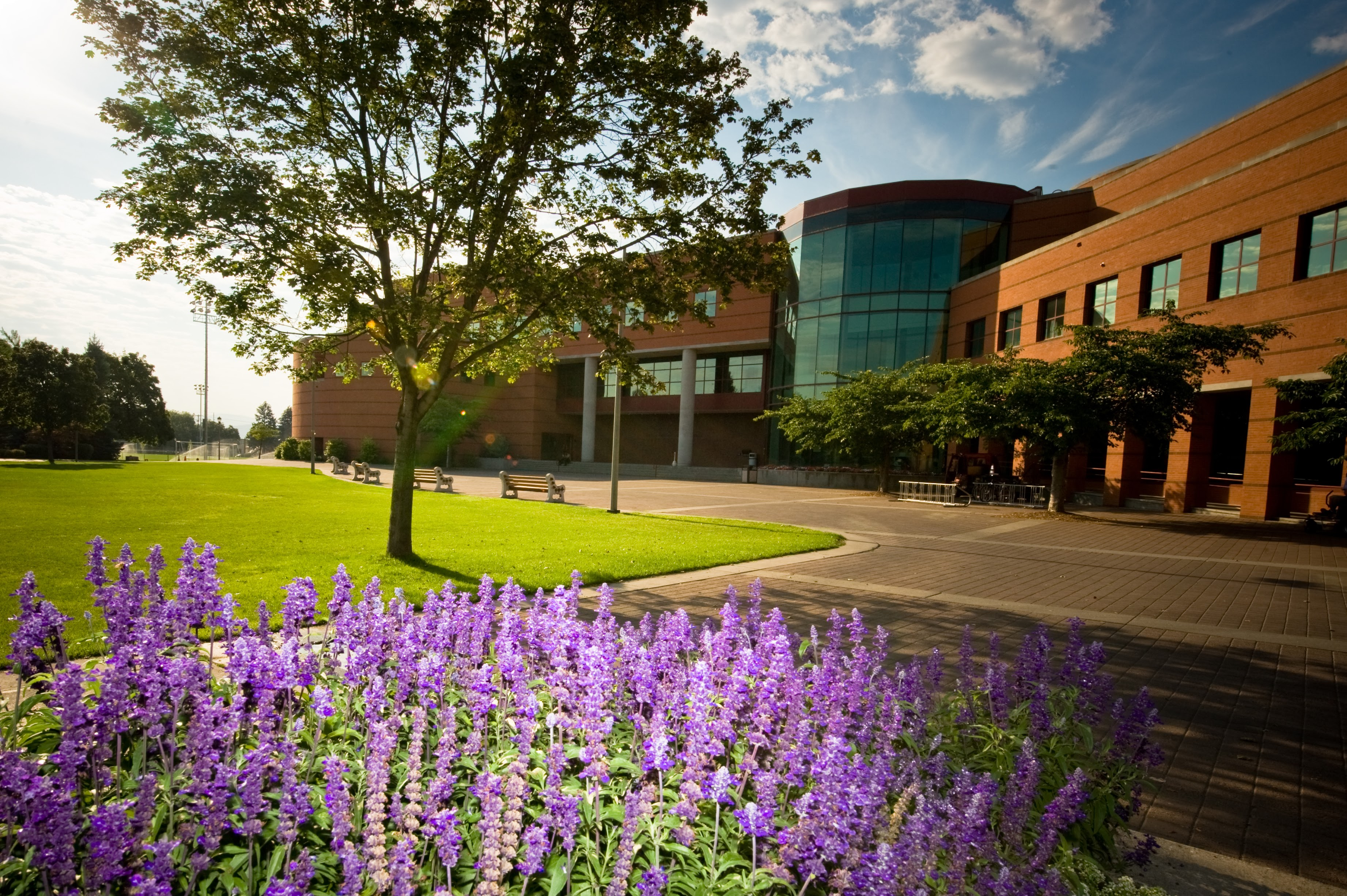
Front of Foley Center Library from northwest

Foley Library opened in 1992 and was named for alumnus Ralph E. Foley (1900–1985), a Superior Court judge for 34 years, and his wife, Helen Higgins Foley (1901–1990). They were the parents of Tom Foley (1929–2013), who represented the state's fifth district in Congress for thirty years (1965–1995), the last six as Speaker of the House.

Foley Center Library succeeded the nearby Crosby library, which was named for movie star and noted alumnus Bing Crosby and opened 35 years earlier in 1957. Both were constructed on the site of Gonzaga Stadium (1922–1949); the Foley Lawn is the northern portion of the stadium's football field.

The building is 137,000 square feet (12,700 m^{2}) and is made of 315,000 bricks. It contains a comprehensive collection (300,000 books) of literary volumes and many online databases that support student research. Other services in the building include interlibrary loan, a writing center, a student success center, academic testing and advising, disability support services, and information technology support.

== University Archives & Special Collections ==
The Special Collections Department works to preserve the heritage of Gonzaga University and to make its historical resources readily available for inspection, evaluation, and research. UASC manages physical materials including rare books dating back as far as the 15th century, and digital materials covering a wide variety of topics and formats.

Some notable collections include the Gerard Manley Hopkins collection, the George R. Nethercutt Congressional papers, the Howard W. Wildin Sheet Music Collection, the Bing Crosby Collection, and the Hate Studies Collection, which collects material related to hate groups in the Pacific Northwest.

== Bing Crosby House Museum ==
Foley Library's Special Collections manages a large collection of material relating to the singer and actor Bing Crosby, a native of Spokane and alumnus of Gonzaga. Now part of Gonzaga's campus, Crosby's childhood home was built in 1911 and still stands at its original location. The main floor houses over 200 items, including gold records, trophies, awards, and Crosby's Oscar for Going My Way (1944). What is not on display is stored in the University Archives and Special Collections’ vault in the Foley Center Library. The museum is free to the public.

== Publishing ==
Gonzaga Library Publishing publishes open-access academic journals for the Gonzaga community. The Foley Library also manages Gonzaga's University Repository, which collects, manages and showcases scholarly and creative work by Gonzaga students, staff and faculty.
