= 1922 USC Trojans football team =

American college football season

1922 USC Trojans football

Rose Bowl champion

Rose Bowl, W 14–3 vs. Penn State
- Conference: Pacific Coast Conference
- Record: 10–1 (3–1 PCC)
- Head coach: Gus Henderson (4th season)
- Captain: Leo Calland
- Home stadium: Bovard Field

1922 Pacific Coast Conference football standings
	Conf.					Overall
Team	W		L		T	W		L		T
California $	4	–	0	–	0	9	–	0	–	0
Oregon	3	–	0	–	1	6	–	1	–	1
Washington	4	–	1	–	1	6	–	1	–	1
USC ^	3	–	1	–	0	10	–	1	–	0
Oregon Agricultural	1	–	3	–	0	3	–	4	–	0
Stanford	1	–	3	–	0	4	–	5	–	0
Washington State	1	–	5	–	0	2	–	5	–	0
Idaho	0	–	4	–	0	3	–	5	–	0
$ – Conference champion; ^ Selected as Rose Bowl representative

The 1922 USC Trojans football team represented the University of Southern California (USC) in the 1922 college football season. In their fourth year under head coach Gus Henderson, the Trojans compiled a 10–1 record (3–1 against conference opponents), finished in fourth place in the Pacific Coast Conference, outscored their opponents by a combined total of 236 to 31, and defeated Penn State in the 1923 Rose Bowl.

== Schedule ==
Date	Opponent	Site	Result	Attendance	Source
September 30	USS Mississippi*	Bovard Field; Los Angeles, CA	W 20–0		
September 30	Alumni*	Bovard Field; Los Angeles, CA	W 20–0		
October 7	at Pomona*	Alumni Field; Pomona, CA	W 54–13		
October 14	Arizona*	Bovard Field; Los Angeles, CA	W 15–0	12,000	
October 21	Nevada*	Bovard Field; Los Angeles, CA	W 6–0	8,000	
October 28	vs. California	Tournament of Roses Stadium; Pasadena, CA	L 0–12	40,000	
November 4	Occidental*	Bovard Field; Los Angeles, CA	W 46–0	11,000	
November 11	at Stanford	Stanford Stadium; Stanford, CA (rivalry)	W 6–0	15,000	
November 18	vs. Idaho	Tournament of Roses Stadium; Pasadena, CA	W 14–0	12,500	
November 30	vs. Washington State	Tournament of Roses Stadium; Pasadena, CA	W 41–3	11,000	
January 1, 1923	vs. Penn State*	Rose Bowl; Pasadena, CA (Rose Bowl)	W 14–3	43,000	
*Non-conference game
