= 1923 All-Pacific Coast football team =

American all-star college football team

The 1923 All-Pacific Coast Conference football team consists of American football players chosen by various organizations for All-Pacific Coast teams for the 1923 college football season.

== All-Pacific Coast selections ==
=== Quarterback ===
- Harold "Chappy" Chapman, Oregon (UP-1)

=== Halfbacks ===
- Donald Nichols, California (UP-1)
- George "Wildcat" Wilson, Washington (UP-1)

=== Fullback ===
- Ernie Nevers, Stanford (UP-1) (College and Pro Football Halls of Fame)

=== Ends ===
- Charles Mell, California (UP-1)
- Jim Lawson, Stanford (UP-1)

=== Tackles ===
- Norman Anderson, USC (UP-1)
- Stewart Beam, California (UP-1)

=== Guards ===
- Richard Faville, Stanford (UP-1)
- John Hawkins, USC (UP-1)

=== Centers ===
- Edwin C. Horrell, California (UP-1)

== Key ==
UP = United Press

== See also ==
- 1923 College Football All-America Team
