= Annice Calland =

American writer (1879–1943)

- Born: Anna Vincent Bodey; February 8, 1879; Champaign County, Ohio, U.S.
- Died: December 21, 1943 (aged 64); Carmel, California, U.S.
- Other names: Annice Shaw, Anne Price, Annie B. Calland
- Occupation: Writer
- Children: 1, Leo Calland

Anna Vincent Bodey Calland (February 8, 1879 – December 21, 1943) was an American poet who wrote as Annice Calland. Her poems, often on nature themes, appeared in The Crisis, Overland Monthly, and the Carmel Pine Cone in the 1920s and 1930s. She also wrote poems and stories based on Haitian and Native American folklore.

== Early life and education ==
Calland was born in Champaign County, Ohio, the daughter of Henry C. Bodey and Sarah Elizabeth Vincent Bodey. Her family ran a farm; her mother died in 1885. She recalled childhood experiences in eastern Oregon.

== Publications ==
Calland was a frequent contributor to Park's Floral Magazine and The Floral World, magazines for amateur gardeners, in 1901 and 1902. Her poems were published in anthologies and in national magazines, including The Crisis and Overland Monthly. "Annice Calland has a real talent and a generally well-directed poetical aim", wrote a reviewer in The Commonweal in 1926. Four of her poems were included in Continental Anthology, a 1930 collection edited by Harold Vinal. In the 1930s she published poems she said were translated from Umatilla traditional songs and stories. Her short poems appeared regularly the Carmel Pine Cone, a newspaper in Carmel-by-the-Sea, California, from 1930 to 1935.

Calland's work continued to be anthologized and reprinted long past her death. One of her poems, "Singing Life", was recommended for church use in 1958. Calland was white, but her story "The Papaloi" was included in 'Girl, Colored' and Other Stories: A Complete Short Fiction Anthology of African American Women Writers in the Crisis Magazine, 1910–2010, edited by Judith Musser. Her poem "Voodoo" was reprinted in Spectral Realms (2016), a "weird poetry journal".

=== Articles and stories ===
- "Swainsonias and Jasmine Grandiflorum" (1901, short article)
- "House Plants and their Needs" (1901, short article)
- "Some Good Combinations in Bedding" (1902, short article)
- "Haiti" (1925, essay)
- "The Papaloi" (1929, story)

=== Poems ===
- "In April" (1900)
- "The Coward's Heritage" (1900)
- "Wild Asters" and "Two Pictures" (1901)
- "A Spring Song", "Sweet Peas", "Little Grass Pinks" and "The Gentians Bloom for Me" (1902)
- "My Little Golden Sun" (1904)
- "Hyacinths" (1907)
- "Pictures" (1921)
- "Excerpts from the Book of Paul Bunyan" (1922)
- "The Desert Rat" (1923)
- "Cherry Blossoms in the Desert" (1923)
- "An Old Trail" (1924)
- "Burro Bells" (1924)
- "Sea Shells" (1924)
- "My Debt to You" (1924)
- "Dawn Light: Caribbean" (1924)
- "The Derelict" (1925, poem)
- "Two Poems of April" (1925)
- "The Sea at Carrenage" (1926)
- "Voodoo" (1926)
- "Beauty" (1926)
- Voodoo (1926, poetry collection)
- "Life's Scourge" (1927)
- "Flowing" (1927, 1933)
- "Singing Life" (1928)
- "Revealment" (1928)
- "Lady in Green" (1928)
- "Salt Winds" (1928)
- "At the Olympic Games" (1929)
- "The Psalm" (1929)
- "Sheep" (1929)
- "The Hills of Port de Paix Haiti" (1930)
- "Desert" and "Zion Canyon" (1930)
- "A Prayer for Lorito" (1930)
- "Pan" (1931)
- "I Love Green Things" (1931)
- "Esse Quam Videri" (1931)
- "In the Kiabab Forest" (1931)
- "When April Goes" (1932)
- "Carcassonne" (1932)
- "The Fragrance of Flowers" (1932)
- "I Shall Go With the Plover" (1932)
- "This Too Shall Pass Away" (1932)
- Grape with Thorn (1933, poetry collection)
- "Indian Legends from Puget Sound" (1933)
- "The Story of Bright-Leaves-Flying" (1933)
- "For a Gypsy in Prison" (1933)
- "Curlew and I" (1933)
- "Clearness" (1933)
- "Wise Men" and "But..." (1934)
- "Yellow Butterflies" (1934)
- "Winds" (1934)
- "Doorways" (1935)
- "My Goldfish Bowl" (1935)
- "The Children" (1936)
- "Ballad of the Madonna Lily"
- "Oranges"
- "The Devastators"

== Personal life and legacy ==
Bodey married Cory Lee Calland in 1899; they had a son, Leo, who became a noted football coach. The Callands divorced in 1906. She ran a boarding house in Eugene, Oregon, and married Benjamin Arthur Price in 1913. The Prices were living together in Portland, Oregon, in the 1920 census, and in Silsbee, California, in the 1930 census, but Calland also lived in Haiti for several years, in Carmel, California, in the 1920s, and in El Centro, California, by 1930.

In 1932, Calland was declared insane by a lunacy commission, but judged sane by a jury in San Francisco. Her husband died in 1931, and she died in 1943, at the age of 64, in California.
