= 1922 Washington Huskies football team =

American college football season

1922 Washington Huskies football
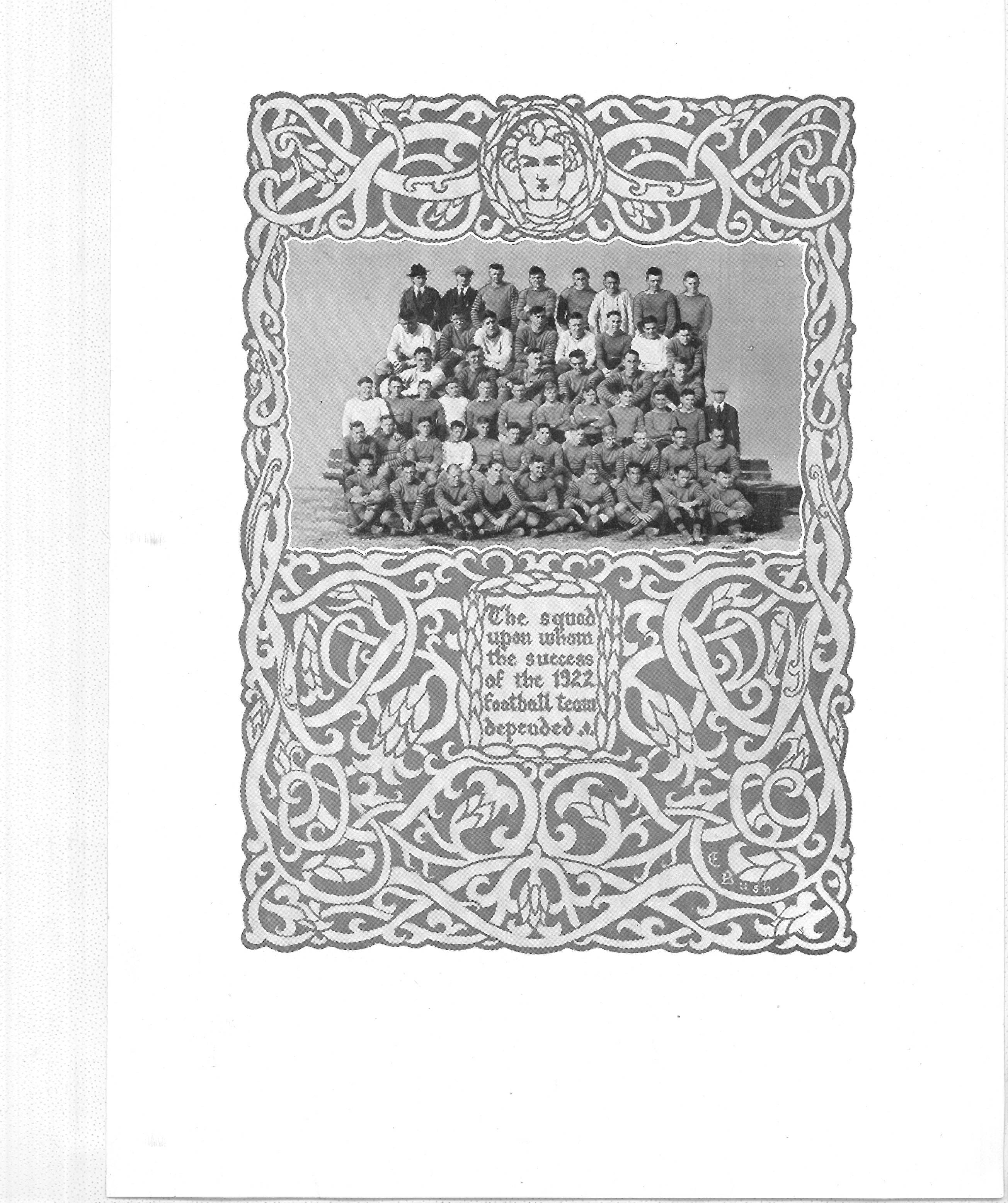

Northwest Conference co-champion
- Conference: Northwest Conference, Pacific Coast Conference
- Record: 6–1–1 (4–0–1 Northwest, 4–1–1 PCC)
- Head coach: Enoch Bagshaw (2nd season)
- Captain: Bob Ingram
- Home stadium: University of Washington Stadium

1922 Northwest Conference football standings
	Conf.					Overall
Team	W		L		T	W		L		T
Oregon +	5	–	0	–	1	6	–	1	–	1
Washington +	4	–	0	–	1	6	–	1	–	1
Whitman	2	–	2	–	0	2	–	4	–	1
Idaho	2	–	3	–	0	3	–	5	–	0
Oregon Agricultural	1	–	2	–	0	3	–	4	–	0
Washington State	1	–	3	–	0	2	–	5	–	0
Willamette	0	–	2	–	0	3	–	4	–	0
Montana	0	–	3	–	0	3	–	4	–	0
+ – Conference co-champions

1922 Pacific Coast Conference football standings
	Conf.					Overall
Team	W		L		T	W		L		T
California $	4	–	0	–	0	9	–	0	–	0
Oregon	3	–	0	–	1	6	–	1	–	1
Washington	4	–	1	–	1	6	–	1	–	1
USC ^	3	–	1	–	0	10	–	1	–	0
Oregon Agricultural	1	–	3	–	0	3	–	4	–	0
Stanford	1	–	3	–	0	4	–	5	–	0
Washington State	1	–	5	–	0	2	–	5	–	0
Idaho	0	–	4	–	0	3	–	5	–	0
$ – Conference champion; ^ Selected as Rose Bowl representative

The 1922 Washington Huskies football team represented the University of Washington as a member of the Northwest Conference and the Pacific Coast Conference (PCC) during the 1922 college football season. In their second season under head coach Enoch Bagshaw, the Huskies compiled an overall record of 6–1–1 and outscored opponents by a combined total of 129 to 72. Washington had a record of 4–0–1 in Northwest Conference play, sharing the conference title with Oregon, and 4–1–1 against PCC opponents, finishing third. Bob Ingram was the team captain.

1922 marked the university's adoption of the Huskies nickname.

== Schedule ==
Date	Time	Opponent	Site	Result	Attendance	Source
September 30	2:30 p.m.	USS Idaho*	University of Washington Stadium; Seattle, WA	W 48–0 (practice)	8,245	
October 7		Montana	University of Washington Stadium; Seattle, WA	W 26–0	9,214	
October 14		Idaho	University of Washington Stadium; Seattle, WA	W 2–0	10,096	
October 21		Oregon Agricultural	University of Washington Stadium; Seattle, WA	W 14–3	11,470	
October 28		at Washington State	Rogers Field; Pullman, WA (rivalry)	W 16–13	10,000	
November 11		California	University of Washington Stadium; Seattle, WA	L 7–45	30,075	
November 18		at Stanford	Stanford Stadium; Stanford, CA	W 12–8	6,000	
November 30		Oregon	University of Washington Stadium; Seattle, WA (rivalry)	T 3–3	12,000	
*Non-conference game
