= 1922 All-Pacific Coast football team =

American all-star college football team

The 1922 All-Pacific Coast football team consists of American football players chosen by various organizations for All-Pacific Coast teams for the 1922 college football season.

== All-Pacific Coast selections ==
=== Quarterback ===
- Charles F. Erb, California (UP-1; GV-1)
- Chapman, Oregon (GV-2)

=== Halfbacks ===
- Donald Nichols, California (UP-1; GV-1)
- Leonard Ziel, Washington (UP-1; GV-1)
- George King, Oregon (GB-1)
- Art Wilcox, Stanford (GV-2)
- Hickey, USC (GV-2)

=== Fullback ===
- Jesse B. Morrison, California (UP-1; GV-1)
- Archie Nesbitt, California (GV-2)

=== Ends ===
- Robert A. Berkey, California (UP-1; GV-1)
- Harold Muller, California (UP-1; GV-1) (College Football Hall of Fame)
- Hall, Washington (GV-2)
- John Milton, USC (GV-2)

=== Tackles ===
- Stewart A. Beam, California (UP-1; GV-1)
- Ford Dunton, Washington State (UP-1)
- Percy Locey, Oregon Agricultural College (GV-1)
- Norman Anderson, USC (GV-2)
- Bob Ingram, Washington (GV-2)

=== Guards ===
- Webster V. Clark, California (UP-1; GV-1)
- Leo Calland, USC (UP-1; GV-2)
- Archie "Tiny" Shields, Oregon (GV-1)
- Ed Kuhn, Washington (GV-2)

=== Centers ===
- Dudley DeGroot, Stanford (UP-1; GV-1)
- Prink Callison, Oregon (GB-1; GV-2)

== Key ==
UP = United Press, "selected by the sporting editors or football writers of nine leading Pacific coast newspapers at the request of the United Press"

GV = George Varnell, "Pacific Coast and Northern Conference referee and local sporting writer"

GB = George Bertz, sporting editor of the Oregon Journal, Portland

== See also ==
- 1922 College Football All-America Team
