= Gonzaga Stadium =

Stadium in Spokane, Washington

- Location in the United States Location in Washington
- Interactive map of Gonzaga Stadium
- Location: Gonzaga University; Spokane, Washington, U.S. (site: Foley Center Library)
- Coordinates: 47.667°N 117.4005°W
- Owner: Gonzaga University
- Operator: Gonzaga University
- Seating type: wood bench
- Capacity: 1922: 10,000; 1913: 2,000
- Surface: Natural grass

Construction
- Groundbreaking: May 16, 1922
- Opened: October 14, 1922; 103 years ago (GU vs. Washington State)
- Renovated: 1931 (lights)
- Closed: 1947; 79 years ago
- Demolished: 1949
- Cost: $100,000 (in 1922) ($1.92 million in 2025)
- General contractor: Huetter Construction Co.

Tenant
- Gonzaga University (multiple sports)

Gonzaga Stadium was an outdoor sports stadium in the northwest United States, located on the campus of Gonzaga University in Spokane, Washington. The home of Gonzaga Bulldogs football, it was built in five months and opened in 1922; the first game was against Washington State on October 14, won by the Cougars with a late field goal, 10–7. After the opening loss, Gonzaga was undefeated in the next ten games at the stadium, with eight wins and two ties.

The football field had a conventional north–south alignment at an elevation of approximately 1,900 feet (580 m) above sea level. Lights were installed in 1931, between the field and the running track.

Like many colleges, football was stopped at Gonzaga during World War II and the last season was in 1941. The program had been in financial difficulty, and was not resumed after the war; the stadium seating was demolished in 1949.

Gonzaga Stadium was used for city high school football until it was deemed unsafe by the city after the 1947 season. The wooden venue hosted a professional preseason game in 1946 under the lights, between the New York Yankees and Brooklyn Dodgers of the new All-America Football Conference. High school football moved to Ferris Field in 1948 for two years, then to the new Memorial Stadium in 1950, later named for Gonzaga alumnus Joe Albi in 1962.

The stadium site made its debut as a football venue in 1913, when Gonzaga hosted Inland Empire rival Idaho on October 11. At its opening, it had seating for 2,000 and room for fifty automobiles to line up.

== Present day ==
The football field of Gonzaga Stadium is currently occupied by the Foley Center Library (1992) and the Foley Lawn. The Crosby Student Center, originally a library, was constructed in 1957 on the site of the northern end of the west grandstand. A statue of Bing Crosby outside the north entrance was dedicated in early 1981.
