= Rose Bowl (stadium) =

Stadium in Pasadena, California

- Spieker Field at the Rose Bowl; America's Stadium

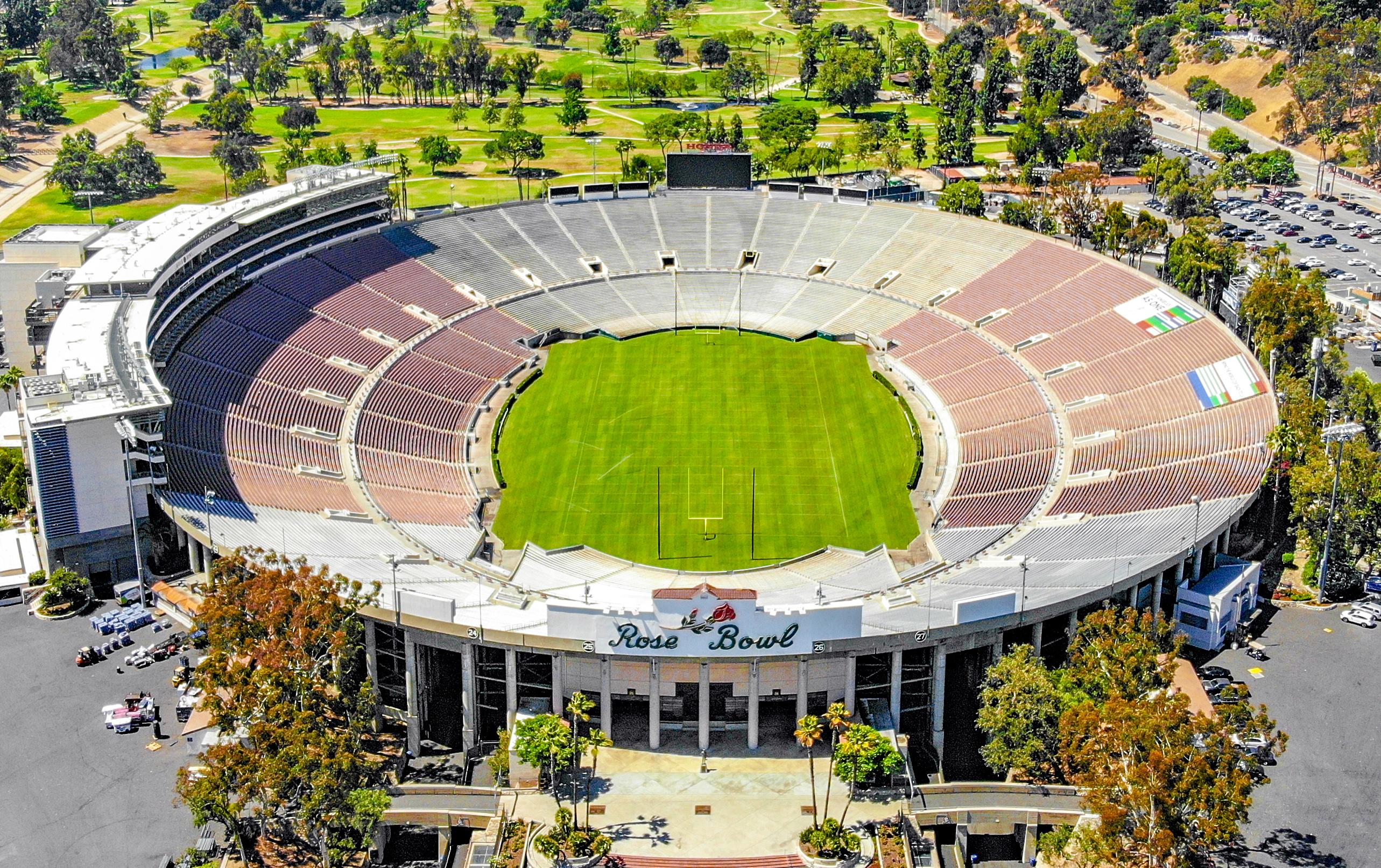
- An aerial view from the south in 2018

- Location in the Greater Los Angeles area Location in California Location in the United States Location in North America
- Interactive map of Rose Bowl
- Address: 1001 Rose Bowl Drive
- Location: Pasadena, California, United States
- Coordinates: 34.161°N 118.168°W
- Elevation: 830 feet (255 m)
- Owner: City of Pasadena
- Operator: Rose Bowl Operating Company
- Capacity: 81,258
- Surface: Bermuda grass
- Record attendance: 106,869 (1973 Rose Bowl)
- Field size: 109.75 m × 48.75 m (360.1 ft × 159.9 ft)
- Public transit: Memorial Park (via shuttle bus)

Construction
- Groundbreaking: 1922; 104 years ago
- Opened: October 28, 1922; 104 years ago first Rose Bowl game: January 1, 1923
- Cost: $272,198 ($5.24 million in 2025)
- Architect: Myron Hunt

Tenants
- Rose Bowl Game (NCAA) (1923–present); Caltech Beavers (NCAA) (1923–1976); Loyola Lions (NCAA) (1951); CSULA Diablos (NCAA) (1957–1960, 1963–1969); Los Angeles Wolves (NASL) (1968); Pasadena Bowl (1946–1966, 1969–1971); Los Angeles Aztecs (NASL) (1978–1979); UCLA Bruins football (NCAA) (1982–present); Los Angeles Galaxy (MLS) (1996–2002)

Website
- rosebowlstadium.com
- The Rose Bowl
- U.S. National Register of Historic Places
- U.S. National Historic Landmark
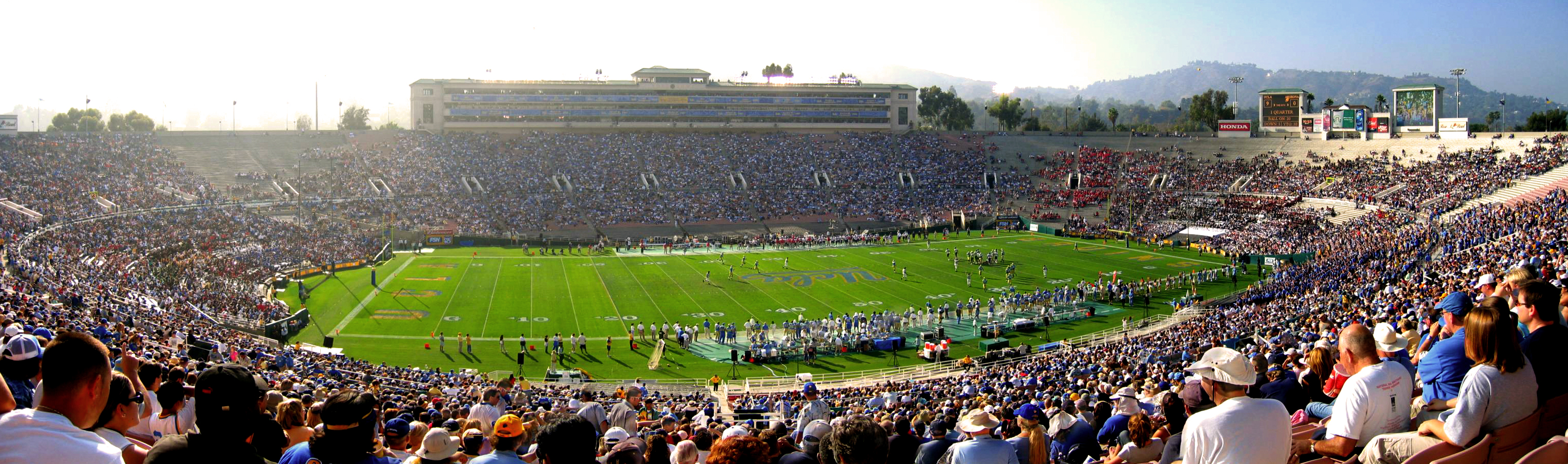
- Panorama in October 2004, hosting Arizona
- NRHP reference No.: 87000755

Significant dates
- Added to NRHP: February 27, 1987; 39 years ago
- Designated NHL: February 27, 1987; 39 years ago

The Rose Bowl (Note: Known officially as Spieker Field at the Rose Bowl since 2017.) is an outdoor athletic stadium located in Pasadena, California, United States. Opened in October 1922, the stadium is recognized as a National Historic Landmark and a California Historic Civil Engineering landmark. With a modern all-seated capacity of 89,702, the Rose Bowl is the 20th-largest stadium in the world, the 11th-largest stadium in the United States, and the 10th-largest NCAA stadium. The stadium is 10 miles (16 km) north-northeast of downtown Los Angeles.

The Rose Bowl is best known as a college football venue, specifically as the host of the annual Rose Bowl Game. Since 1982, it has served as the home stadium of the UCLA Bruins football team. Five Super Bowl games, third most of any venue, have been played in the stadium. The Rose Bowl is a noted soccer venue, having hosted the 1994 FIFA World Cup Final, 1999 FIFA Women's World Cup Final, and the gold medal match of 1984 Summer Olympics, as well as numerous CONCACAF, Copa America, and United States Soccer Federation matches. The Rose Bowl will host both the men's and women's soccer gold medal matches at the 2028 Summer Olympics.

The stadium and adjacent Brookside Golf and Country Club are owned by the city of Pasadena and managed by the Rose Bowl Operating Company, a non-profit organization whose board is selected by council members of the city of Pasadena. UCLA and the Pasadena Tournament of Roses also have one member on the company board.

== History ==
=== Design and construction ===
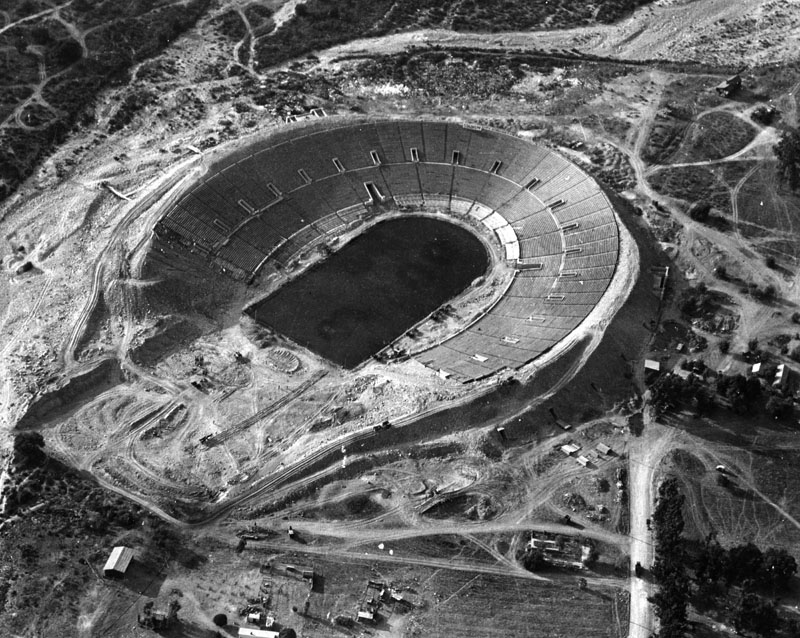
Construction in 1921; note the original horseshoe shape

Through January 1922, the bowl now known as the Rose Bowl Game was played at Tournament Park, about three miles (5 km) southeast, adjacent to the campus of the California Institute of Technology (Caltech). The Pasadena Tournament of Roses Association, the game's organizer, realized the temporary stands were inadequate for a crowd of more than 40,000, and sought to build a better, permanent stadium.

The stadium was designed by architect Myron Hunt in 1921. His design was influenced by the Yale Bowl in New Haven, Connecticut, which opened in 1914. The Arroyo Seco was selected as the location for the stadium. The Rose Bowl was under construction from February 27, 1922, to October 1922. The nearby Los Angeles Memorial Coliseum also was under construction during this time and would be completed in May 1923, shortly after the Rose Bowl was completed. Originally built as a horseshoe, the stadium was expanded several times. The southern stands were completed in 1928, enclosing the stadium into a complete bowl. The stadium remains uncovered, with spectators having no protection from the elements.

The field's alignment is nearly north–south, offset slightly northwest, and the elevation at street level is approximately 830 feet (255 m) above sea level.

The stadium's name was alternatively "Tournament of Roses Stadium" or "Tournament of Roses Bowl", until being settled as "Rose Bowl" before the 1923 Rose Bowl game, in reference to the unusually named (at the time) Yale Bowl.

The stadium is in a residential area. Streets are converted to one lane by the Pasadena Police Department to ease ingress and egress during major events. When constructed, the majority of visitors arrived to the bowl via the Pacific Electric interurban streetcar system; however, this service ended in 1958. Weather permitting, the 36 holes of Brookside Golf Course are used for parking, providing 20,000 spaces. There are nine paved parking lots that provide spaces for another 6,000 vehicles. In 2016, Rose Bowl contracted ParkJockey to streamline parking in and around the stadium. There is improved signage, a shuttle service to help visitors get to the stadium and mobile generator-powered lighting for visitors walking on the golf course at night.

=== Dedication ===
The first game was a regular season contest in 1922, when California defeated USC 12–0 on October 28. This was the only loss for USC and Cal finished the season undefeated. California declined the invitation to the 1923 Rose Bowl game and USC went instead. The stadium was dedicated officially on January 1, 1923, when USC defeated Penn State 14–3.

=== Seating ===
The stadium seating has been reconfigured several times since its construction in 1922. The South end was filled in to complete the bowl and more seats have been added. The original wooden benches were replaced by aluminum benches in 1969. New grandstand and loge seats were installed in 1971. New red seat backs were added to 22,000 seats prior to the 1980 Rose Bowl. A Rose Bowl improvement was conducted because of UCLA's 1982 move and the 1984 Summer Olympics. This resulted in new seat backs for 50,000 seats.

For many years, the Rose Bowl had the largest football stadium capacity in the United States, eventually being surpassed by Michigan Stadium (107,601). The Rose Bowl's maximum stated seating capacity was 104,091 from 1972 to 1997. Some of the seats closest to the field were never used during this time for UCLA regular season games, and were covered by tarps. Official capacity was lowered following the 1998 Rose Bowl. Slightly different figures are given for the current capacity because the lower-level seats behind the team benches are not used for some events since the spectators can not see through the standing players or others on the field. UCLA reports the capacity at 91,136. The Tournament of Roses reports the capacity at 92,542. The 2006 Rose Bowl game, which was also the BCS championship game, had a crowd of 93,986. In the 2011 contest between TCU and Wisconsin, the listed attendance was 94,118. As of 2008, the Rose Bowl is the 11th largest football stadium, and is still the largest stadium that hosts post-season bowl games. For concerts held there, the Rose Bowl holds almost 60,000 people. The stadium's 2014 remodeling removed the lower "lettered row" seats on each side behind the players' benches and provided access in and out of the stadium for the lower sections of the Rose Bowl, restoring its original design.

For the 2021 season, UCLA began using a tarp to decrease capacity and cover the north upper end zone, the tarp spells out U-C-L-A with advertisements on the side. This brought official capacity down to 69,747 seats.

=== Renovations ===
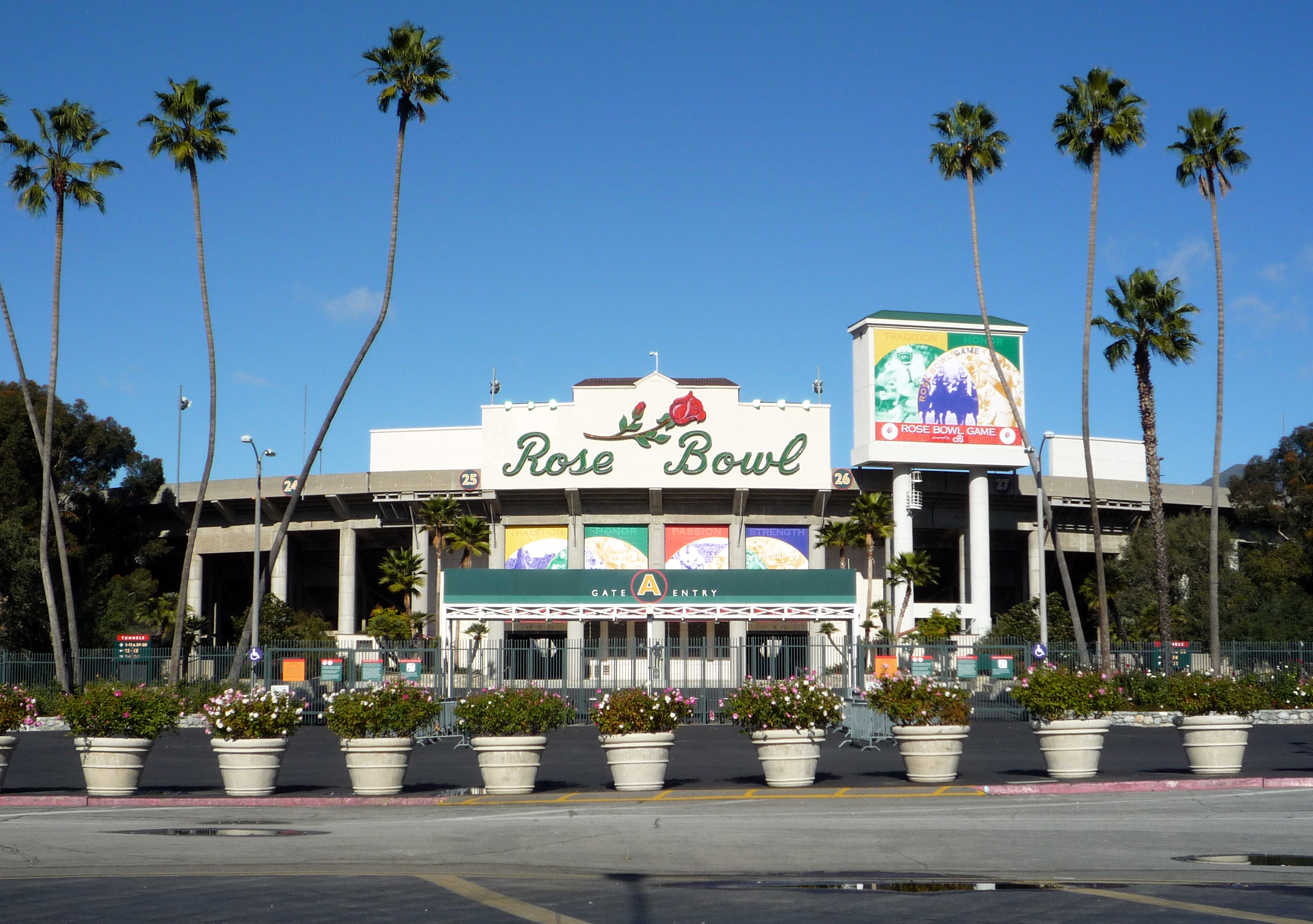
Exterior of the Rose Bowl stadium before the renovation

The press box was updated before the 1962 Rose Bowl with an elevator and two rows. The cost was $356,000. The Press Box was refurbished for UCLA's move in 1982 and the 1984 Summer Olympics. In 2011 and 2012, the press box was undergoing renovation as part of the larger renovation originally budgeted at $152 million in 2010. Costs had increased to $170 million during construction. Work proceeded during the 2011 football season, and was expected to be completed before the UCLA Bruins' first home game in 2012. Some unforeseen problems had been encountered due to the stadium's age and some renovations done in the early 1990s. Most of the planned renovations were completed in 2013. Because of the increased construction cost, items deferred for the future are additional new restrooms, the historic field hedge, new entry-gate structures, ribbon boards and additional new concession stands. The stadium started "The Brick Campaign" to help pay for some of the cost of the renovations. The Brick Campaign, completed in 2014, features a large logo of the Pasadena Tournament of Roses and the donor bricks arranged by universities in front of the south main entrance to the stadium. A large 30 feet (9.1 m) tall by 77 feet (23 m) wide LED video display board was added to the north end of the stadium as a part of the renovation.

=== Court of Champions and Rose Plaza ===
The Court of Champions is at the stadium's south end. Rose Bowl game records along with the names of the coaches and the MVP players, are shown on the plaques attached to the exterior wall. The Hall of Fame statue is also at the Court of Champions. The 2014 renovation allows more plaques to be placed on the wall and floor for future games. The statue of Jackie Robinson, who played football with Pasadena City College, was dedicated in 2017. In 2019, Brandi Chastain's statue was added outside of the south gate. The statue portrays Brandi in her celebration of her winning penalty kick in the 1999 FIFA Women's World Cup final, where she exposed her sports bra after removing her jersey. The image of her celebration was described in The New York Times as "most iconic photograph ever taken of a female athlete", and it has been considered one of the more famous photographs of a woman celebrating an athletic victory. A statue to honor Keith Jackson, the longtime ABC broadcaster who had called many games from the Rose Bowl, was unveiled on December 14, 2019, at the stadium's Rose Plaza. The commemorative bricks are located in front of Gate A. There are sections reserved for the City of Pasadena, Tournament of Roses, Rose Bowl, and each school of the Pac-12 and Big Ten conferences.

=== Terry Donahue Pavilion ===
The seven-story Terry Donahue Pavilion is named for the former UCLA football head coach, who was the winningest coach in UCLA and Pac-12 history. It houses the press boxes, broadcast booths, premium seating, boxes and suites. There are 54 luxury suites, 48 loge boxes, 1,200 club seats, state-of-the-art press boxes and a new broadcast center. The previous press box was replaced by a new self-contained media area capable of accommodating 318 credentialed working press, along with a separate level dedicated to game day operations, including TV and radio broadcasting, instant replay booths, coaching staffs and an emergency command center. The radio and TV booths were renamed "The Keith Jackson Broadcast Center" in December 2015. Jackson, the former ABC-TV sportscaster, coined the phrase "The Granddaddy of Them All" for the Rose Bowl game.

=== 1922 Locker Room Museum ===
The old 1922 Rose Bowl locker room was restored in 2017 and converted into a little museum. Sections are dedicated to the construction of the Rose Bowl, the Rose Bowl games, UCLA football, and the NFL Super Bowl games played at the Rose Bowl.

=== South end 2026 ===
In 2026, 5,000 bench seats in the South end of the Rose Bowl are to be transformed into a field-level club. It will be called the South Field Club. It is expected to cost about $30 million. Fundraising for the Rose Bowl Lasting Legacy Campaign was kicked off in 2024. The funds were generated by sponsorship partners and private donors towards $80 millions in renovations to be completed before the 2028 Olympic games.

=== Venue rankings ===
In 1999, Sports Illustrated listed the Rose Bowl at number 20 in the Top 20 Venues of the 20th Century. In 2007, Sports Illustrated named the Rose Bowl the number one venue in college sports.

== Football ==
=== Rose Bowl Game ===
The Rose Bowl stadium is best known in the U.S. for its hosting of the Rose Bowl, a postseason college football game. The game is played after the Tournament of Roses Parade on New Year's Day, or, if January 1 is a Sunday, on Monday, January 2. The stadium's name has given rise to the term "bowl game" for postseason football games, regardless of whether they are played in a bowl-shaped or "Bowl"-named stadium. The Rose Bowl Game is commonly referred to as "The Granddaddy of Them All" because of its stature as the oldest of all the bowl games. The visual of the afternoon sun setting on the San Gabriel Mountains on New Year's Day is recognized as an important part of the tradition of the game. Since 1945, the Rose Bowl has been the highest attended college football bowl game.

Since its opening, the Rose Bowl stadium has hosted the bowl game every year except in 1942 and 2021. The 1942 Rose Bowl was moved to Durham, North Carolina, at the campus of Duke University. Duke, which played in the game on January 1, volunteered to host the contest because of security concerns on the West Coast in the weeks following the attack on Pearl Harbor. The 2021 Rose Bowl was played at AT&T Stadium in Arlington, Texas due to capacity restrictions in place in California due to the COVID-19 Pandemic.

=== BCS National Championship ===
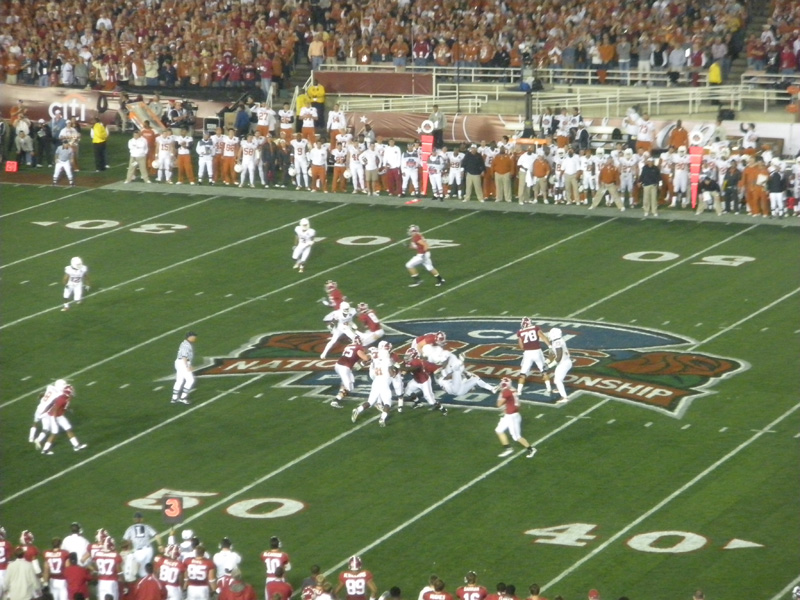
Texas and Alabama on January 7, 2010

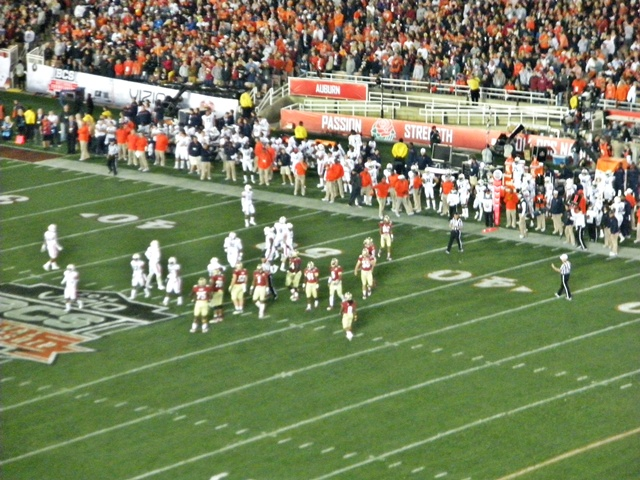
Florida State and Auburn on January 6, 2014

Starting with the 1998 season, the Rose Bowl became part of the Bowl Championship Series (BCS). The 2002 and 2006 games also were the BCS Championship games, matching the #1 and #2 BCS teams in the nation. The 2010 BCS National Championship Game was played six days after the Rose Bowl game as a completely separate event from the Tournament of Roses, though it managed the event. The stadium hosted the 2014 BCS National Championship Game, the final game before the BCS was replaced by the current College Football Playoff, when it celebrated its 100th anniversary of the Rose Bowl game.

Season	Game	Date	Visiting team	Points	Home team	Points	Spectators
2001	2002	January 3	Nebraska	14	Miami	37	93,781
2005	2006	January 4	Texas	41	USC*	38	93,986
2009	2010	January 7	Texas	21	Alabama	37	94,906
2013	2014	January 6	Auburn	31	Florida State	34	94,208

Note: *USC later vacated all wins during the season.

=== College Football Playoff semifinals ===
The Rose Bowl Game is one of the six primary bowls of the College Football Playoff (CFP), which replaced the BCS effective with the 2014 season. Every three years, the Rose Bowl will match two of the top four teams selected by the system's selection committee to compete for a spot at the national championship game. The first CFP semifinal game at the Rose Bowl was the 2015 Rose Bowl, whose winner advanced to the championship game on January 12 at AT&T Stadium in Texas. AT&T Stadium later hosted the 2021 Rose Bowl, also a CFP semifinal, with limited attendance due to the COVID-19 pandemic.

Season	Rose Bowl	Date	Visiting team	Points	Home team	Points	Spectators
2014	2015	January 1	#3 Florida State	20	#2 Oregon	59	91,322
2017	2018	January 1	#3 Georgia	54 (2OT)	#2 Oklahoma	48	80,072
2020	2021	January 1	#4 Notre Dame	14	#1 Alabama	31	18,373
2023	2024	January 1	#4 Alabama	20	#1 Michigan	27 (OT)	83,928

Though the Rose Bowl is eligible to bid on hosting the College Football Playoff Championship Game in years it is not hosting a semifinal, it has no plans to do so. The first championship game held in Southern California was at SoFi Stadium in Inglewood in January 2023.

=== College Football Playoff quarterfinals ===
Season	Rose Bowl	Date	Visiting team	Points	Home team	Points	Spectators
2024	2025	January 1	#8 Ohio State	41	#1 Oregon	21	90,732
2025	2026	January 1	#9 Alabama	3	#1 Indiana	38	90,278

=== UCLA Bruins football ===
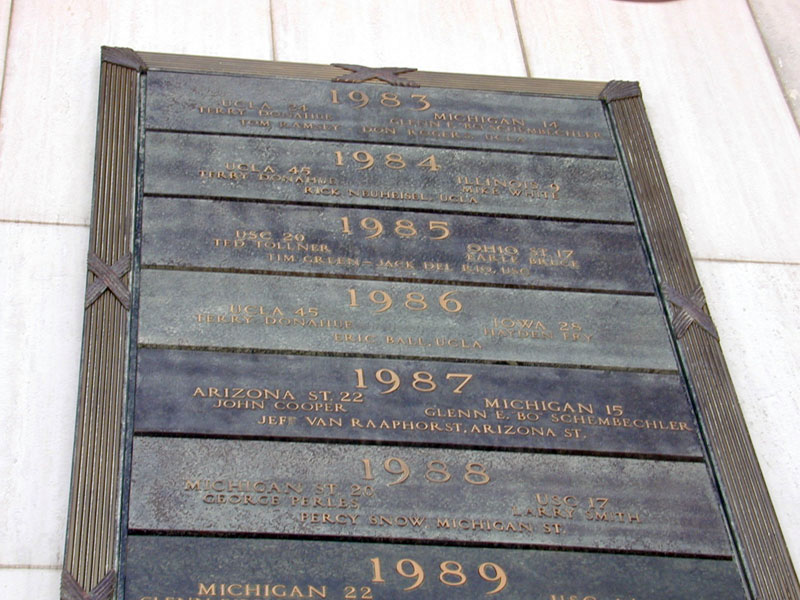
Previous edition of Rose Bowl records at Hall of Champions

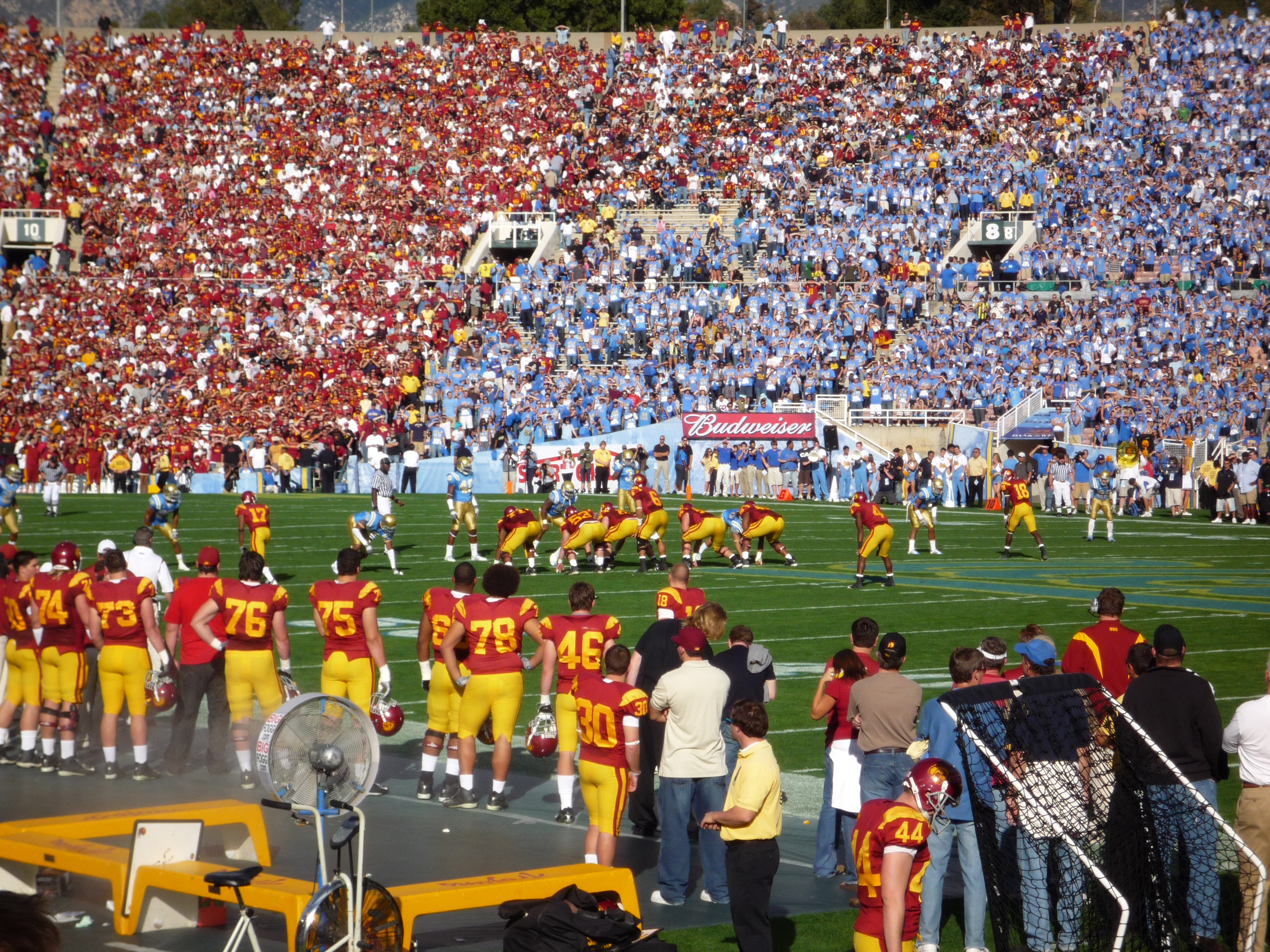
UCLA–USC football game at the Rose Bowl; the 2008 edition marked a return to the tradition of both teams wearing home jerseys

The Rose Bowl stadium has been the home football field for UCLA since 1982. The UCLA Bruins had played their home games at the Los Angeles Memorial Coliseum since 1928. There was an attempt to build a 44,000-seat stadium on campus, at the site where Drake Stadium eventually was built. However, the proposal was blocked by influential area residents, as well as some politicians.

At the start of the 1982 NFL season, with the Oakland Raiders scheduled to move into the Coliseum, UCLA decided to relocate its home games to the Rose Bowl Stadium. The Bruins went on to play two straight Rose Bowl games in their new home stadium, the 1983 Rose Bowl and the 1984 Rose Bowl. UCLA has participated in five Rose Bowl games since moving to the stadium. The stadium is the host of the UCLA–USC rivalry football game on even numbered years, alternating with the Coliseum. In the first rivalry game at the stadium between UCLA and USC in 1982, USC fans sat on the west side of the stadium and UCLA fans sat on the east side of the stadium, mirroring an arrangement that existed when the teams shared the Coliseum. Both teams also wore their home uniforms. In 1984, USC fans were moved to the end zone seats, which ended the tradition of shared stadium. Because of the shared arrangement, and the participation of USC in a number of Rose Bowl games, both schools have winning records in each other's home stadium. The Bruins travel 26 miles from campus to Pasadena to play home games, but only 14 miles to their biggest road game at USC every other year. The Bruins have played 12 Rose Bowl games in the stadium. The attendance of 105,464 for the 1976 Rose Bowl is the largest crowd to ever watch a UCLA football game in the stadium. It is a record that is not likely to be broken, as the Rose Bowl seating has been reduced to 91,136 for UCLA Bruins Football and 92,542 for the Rose Bowl Game.

In November 2025, it was reported that the Bruins were planning on breaking their lease with the Rose Bowl to move to SoFi Stadium in Inglewood, the current home of the Los Angeles Rams and Los Angeles Chargers. The move has been met with negative reception from fans and analysts as well as a lawsuit from the city of Pasadena. On February 21, 2026, the Bruins confirmed they would be playing their 2026 home games at the Rose Bowl, despite the litigation continuing in the background.

=== Caltech Beavers football ===
Caltech, a university located in Pasadena, played most home games in the Rose Bowl from the time of its construction until the school dropped football in 1993. Caltech jovially claimed to play before the greatest number of empty seats in the nation.

=== Junior Rose Bowl ===
The stadium hosted the Junior Rose Bowl from 1946 to 1971 and 1976 to 1977. Between 1946 and 1966 and 1976 and 1977, the game pitted the California Junior College football champions against the NJCAA football champions for the national championship. It was organized by the Pasadena Junior Chamber of Commerce. The Junior Rose Bowl became the Pasadena Bowl from 1967 to 1971; it was billed as the Junior Rose Bowl the first two years, but instead two teams from the NCAA College Division competed (then later the University Division, usually featuring teams that were not invited to other major bowls).

=== The Pasadena Turkey Tussle ===
The Turkey Tussle is a football game that takes place at the Rose Bowl Stadium between the two rival schools in the Pasadena Unified School District. The yearly competition between John Muir High School and what is now Pasadena High School began in the 1940s. Before switching to the current games within Pasadena High School and John Muir High School, the event initially featured Pasadena Community College and John Muir Junior College (CBS News). The stadium usually gets hundreds of fans, students, alumni, and parents/families from both sides filling the seats at the Rose Bowl Stadium. The winner of the football matchup takes home the iconic Victory Bell, which is then displayed in the halls of either school.

=== 1983 Army–Navy game ===
The Rose Bowl stadium is the only site west of the Mississippi River to host an Army–Navy Game (1983). The city of Pasadena paid for the traveling expenses of all the students and supporters of both the U.S. Naval Academy and U.S. Military Academy. The attendance was 81,000. The game was brought to the Rose Bowl as there are a large number of military installations and servicemen and women, along with many retired military personnel, on the West Coast. While the game has been held in multiple locations, only the 1926 game in Chicago, this 1983 game, and the 2023 game in Boston have been played outside the Mid-Atlantic region. The game is most frequently played in Philadelphia, followed by the New York area and the Baltimore–Washington area.

=== Super Bowl ===
The stadium has hosted the Super Bowl five times. The first was Super Bowl XI in January 1977, when the Oakland Raiders beat the Minnesota Vikings 32–14. The game was also played there in 1980 (XIV), 1983 (XVII), 1987 (XXI) and 1993 (XXVII). The Rose Bowl is one of two venues (with Stanford Stadium) to host a Super Bowl though having never served as the full-time home stadium for an NFL or AFL team (Stanford Stadium hosted one San Francisco 49ers game after the 1989 Loma Prieta earthquake).

Season	Date	Super Bowl	Visiting team	Points	Home team	Points	Spectators
1976	January 9, 1977	XI	Oakland Raiders	32	Minnesota Vikings	14	103,438
1979	January 20, 1980	XIV	Los Angeles Rams	19	Pittsburgh Steelers	31	103,985
1982	January 30, 1983	XVII	Miami Dolphins	17	Washington Redskins	27	103,667
1986	January 25, 1987	XXI	Denver Broncos	20	New York Giants	39	101,063
1992	January 31, 1993	XXVII	Buffalo Bills	17	Dallas Cowboys	52	98,374

The NFL has a policy limiting the hosting of a Super Bowl to metropolitan areas with NFL teams. The Rose Bowl was not considered as a Super Bowl site after the Rams and Raiders departed the Los Angeles area in 1995. The most recent Super Bowl held in Southern California was Super Bowl (LVI) in February 2022 at the Rams' and Chargers' SoFi Stadium in Inglewood (the Rams returned to Los Angeles in 2016, the Chargers the following year).

Although proposed, no NFL team has called the Rose Bowl a regular season home. After losing both its local teams in the Los Angeles market in 1995, the National Football League began looking to either start or relocate a franchise to the Los Angeles area. The closest the Rose Bowl came to being the home of an NFL team was in 1996 when the Seattle Seahawks announced a relocation to Los Angeles with the Rose Bowl as their planned stadium but the move was blocked by the NFL. After many years of varying offers, no deal could be struck between the NFL owners, the stadium's owner, and the City of Pasadena, following a vote of disapproval by its residents in November 2006.

On November 19, 2012, Pasadena officials approved a proposal which could have allowed an NFL team to temporarily play in the Rose Bowl. The Rose Bowl, however, never ended up acting as a home field for an NFL team. When the Los Angeles Rams moved from St. Louis prior to the 2016 NFL season, the Rose Bowl was considered as a temporary home before the Rams ultimately settled on playing in USC's Los Angeles Memorial Coliseum, the Rams' home from 1946 to 1979. The Los Angeles Chargers went to Dignity Health Sports Park as their temporary venue in 2017.

== Soccer ==
Though best known as an American football stadium, the Rose Bowl is also one of the most decorated soccer (association football) venues in the world. The stadium hosted the prestigious 1994 FIFA World Cup Final (an event watched by over 700 million people worldwide), the 1999 FIFA Women's World Cup Final (at the time the most attended women's soccer match in history), and the 1984 Olympic Gold Medal Match, making it the only venue in the world to host all three of international soccer's major championship matches. It has also hosted MLS Cup 1998, the 2002 and 2011 CONCACAF Gold Cup Finals, and the CONCACAF Cup in 2015.

The United States men's national soccer team has played 17 games in the Rose Bowl, the fourth most of any venue. It has hosted 5 U.S. women's national team matches. Mexico has played a number of friendlies in the stadium against nations other than the United States.

In the past, it was also the home ground of two North American Soccer League clubs, the Los Angeles Wolves in 1968 and the Los Angeles Aztecs in 1978 and 1979. From 1996 through 2002, the stadium was the home ground of Major League Soccer club Los Angeles Galaxy. The stadium once again hosted the Galaxy on July 4, 2023, in a one-off game (nicknamed El Tráfico) with city rivals Los Angeles FC, being previously delayed from its original date of February 25, 2023. The match set a new MLS attendance record for a standalone match, with 82,110 spectators.

On July 27, 2016, the Rose Bowl hosted a 2016 International Champions Cup match between Chelsea and Liverpool. Chelsea won the match 1–0. The Rose Bowl also hosted a 2018 International Champions Cup match between F.C. Barcelona and Tottenham Hotspur where Barcelona won 5–3 in penalty kicks after a 2–2 draw.

=== Major soccer tournaments ===
The Rose Bowl is one of two stadiums to have hosted the FIFA World Cup finals for both men and women. The Rose Bowl hosted the men's final in 1994 and the women's final in 1999. (The only other stadium with this honor is the Råsunda Stadium near Stockholm, Sweden, which hosted the men's final in 1958 and the women's final in 1995.) Both Rose Bowl finals were scoreless after double extra time and decided on penalty shootouts; Brazil beating Italy in the 1994 FIFA World Cup Final 3–2, and the United States beating China in the 1999 women's final 5–4.

The Rose Bowl also hosted group stage matches of the Copa América Centenario in 2016. It also hosted several matches including the final of the 1984 Olympics men's soccer tournament. It has also regularly featured CONCACAF Gold Cup matches including two finals.

The Rose Bowl was a candidate to host matches during the 2026 FIFA World Cup, but FIFA selected SoFi Stadium instead. The Rose Bowl was a venue for the 2025 FIFA Club World Cup and will host knockout matches for the 2028 Summer Olympics, including the gold medal matches.

=== 1984 Summer Olympics - Men's Football ===
Date	Time	Team #1	Result	Team #2	Round	Attendance
July 29	19:30	Italy	1–0	Egypt	Group D	37,430
July 30	19:00	Brazil	3–1	Saudi Arabia	Group C	40,799
July 31	19:00	Italy	1–0	United States	Group D	63,624
August 1	19:00	Morocco	1–0	Saudi Arabia	Group C	36,909
August 2	19:00	Costa Rica	1–0	Italy	Group D	41,291
August 3	19:00	Morocco	0–2	Brazil	Group C	49,355
August 5	19:00	France	2–0	Egypt	Quarterfinals	66,228
August 6	19:00	Yugoslavia	5–2	West Germany	Quarterfinals	58,439
August 8	18:15	France	4–2 (a.e.t.)	Yugoslavia	Semifinals	97,451
August 10	19:00	Yugoslavia	2–1	Italy	Bronze	100,374
August 11	19:00	France	2–0	Brazil	Final	101,799

=== 1994 FIFA World Cup ===
Date	Time	Team #1	Result	Team #2	Round	Attendance
June 18	16:30	Colombia	1–3	Romania	Group A	91,856
June 19	16:30	Cameroon	2–2	Sweden	Group B	93,194
June 22	16:30	United States	2–1	Colombia	Group A	93,469
June 26	16:30	United States	0–1	Romania	Group A	93,869
July 3	13:30	Romania	3–2	Argentina	Round of 16	90,469
July 13	16:30	Brazil	1–0	Sweden	Semifinal	91,856
July 16	12:30	Sweden	4–0	Bulgaria	3rd place match	91,500
July 17	12:30	Brazil	0–0 (3–2 on pen.)	Italy	Final	94,194

=== 1999 FIFA Women's World Cup ===
Date	Time	Team #1	Result	Team #2	Round	Attendance
June 20	16:00	Italy	1–1	Germany	Group B	17,100
June 20	18:30	North Korea	1–2	Nigeria	Group A	17,100
July 10	10:15	Norway	0–0 (4–5 on pen.)	Brazil	3rd place match	90,185
July 10	12:30	United States	0–0 (5–4 on pen.)	China	Final	90,185

=== 2025 FIFA Club World Cup ===
Date	Time (UTC−8)	Team #1	Res.	Team #2	Round	Attendance
June 15	12:00	Paris Saint-Germain (France)	4–0	(Spain) Atlético Madrid	Group B	80,619
June 17	18:00	Monterrey (Mexico)	1–1	(Italy) Inter Milan	Group E	40,311
June 19	18:00	Paris Saint-Germain (France)	0–1	(Brazil) Botafogo	Group B	53,699
June 21	18:00	River Plate (Argentina)	0–0	(Mexico) Monterrey	Group E	57,393
June 23	12:00	Atlético Madrid (Spain)	1–0	(Brazil) Botafogo	Group B	22,992
June 25	18:00	Urawa Red Diamonds (Japan)	0–4	(Mexico) Monterrey	Group E	14,312

=== 2028 Summer Olympics ===
Date	Time (UTC−8)	Team #1	Res.	Team #2	Round	Attendance
July 21	TBD		–		Women's quarterfinal	
July 24	TBD		–		Men's semifinal	
July 25	TBD		–		Women's semifinal	
July 29	TBD		–		Men's gold	
July 29	TBD		–		Women's gold	

All times in UTC−8.

== Other events and usage ==
=== Pasadena events ===
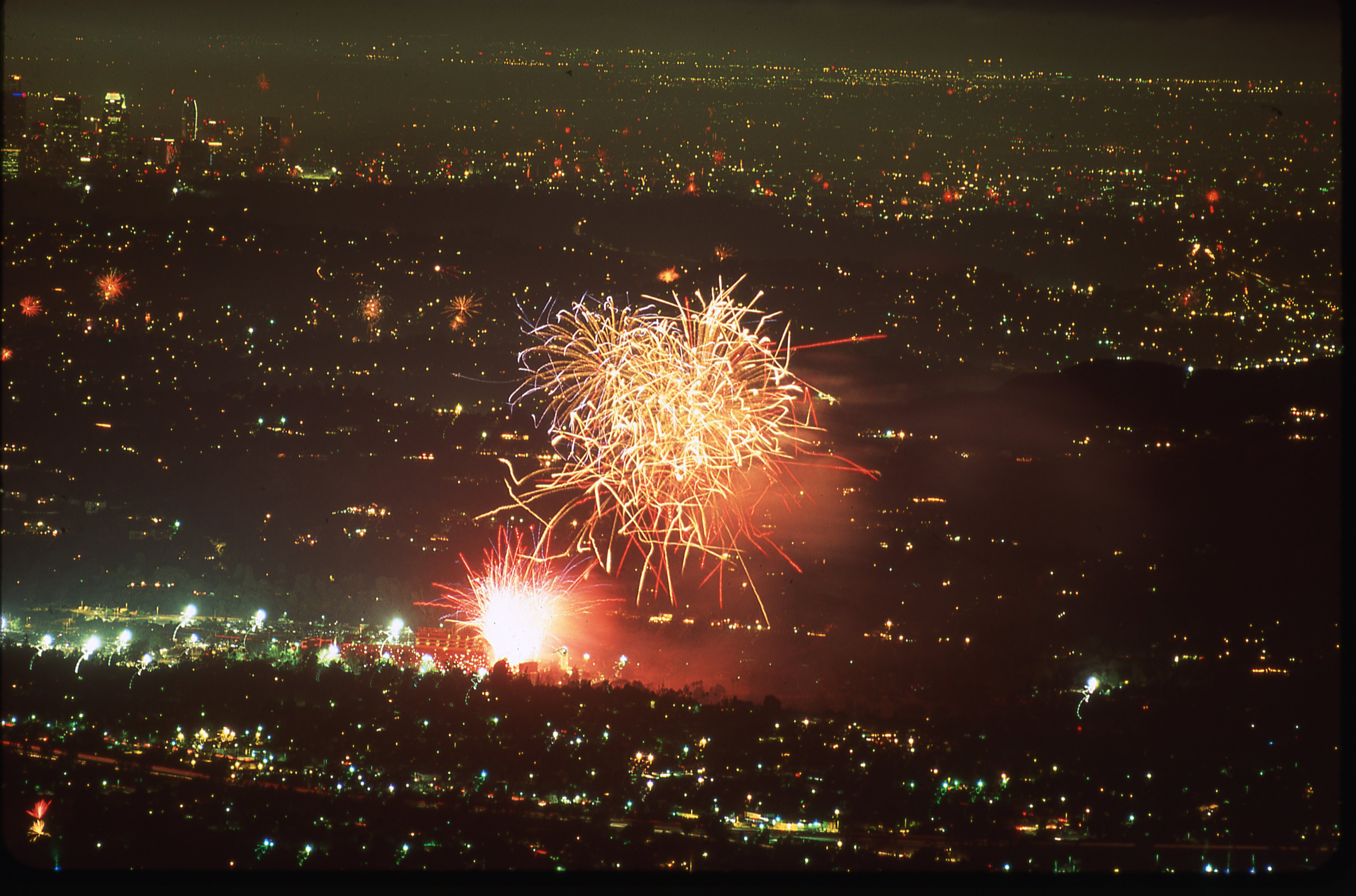
4th of July Fireworks over the Rose Bowl

The Rose Bowl has hosted the Pasadena "Americafest" Independence Day celebration annually since 1927. The annual fireworks show is considered one of the top fireworks shows in the nation. In 2023, AmericaFest did not take place, being replaced by a rescheduled El Tráfico (originally scheduled for February 25), however a firework show did occur after the game. In 2025 the annual fireworks show was replaced by a drone show, due to concerns about fireworks being fire hazards, these concerns likely triggered by the Eaton Fire, which had happened earlier in the year.

Another local event is the Rose Bowl Flea Market held the second Sunday of each month, on the stadium parking lots. Hosted by promoter R.G. Canning, it claims to be the largest Flea market on the West Coast. The stadium hosts the annual "Turkey Tussle" homecoming football game between John Muir High School and Pasadena High School, in late October.

The Rose Bowl hosted its annual graduation ceremonies for Blair High School, John Muir High School and Pasadena High School until 1984, before staging it at the individual schools until 1998. Currently all three high schools along with John Marshall Fundamental Secondary School hold their graduation ceremonies at the Pasadena Civic Auditorium in early June until 2019. In June 2021, the Pasadena Unified School District used the Rose Bowl to hold their high school graduation ceremonies for all four high schools, along with Rose City High School and Center for Independent Studies.

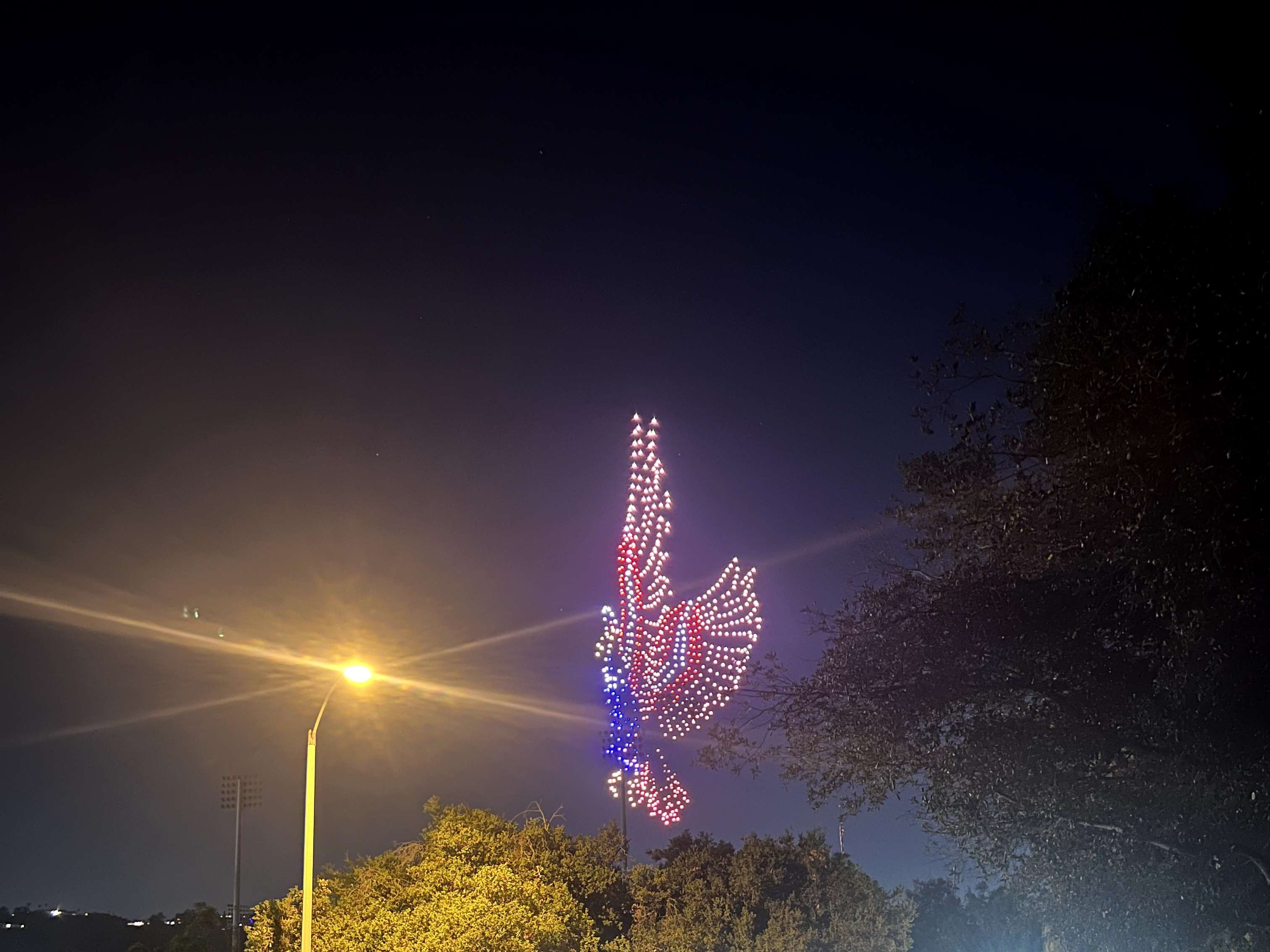
An eagle design at the 2025 Independence Day drone show at the Rose Bowl in Pasadena, California.

=== 1932 Summer Olympics ===
The Rose Bowl was the track cycling venue for the 1932 Summer Olympics.

=== Concerts ===
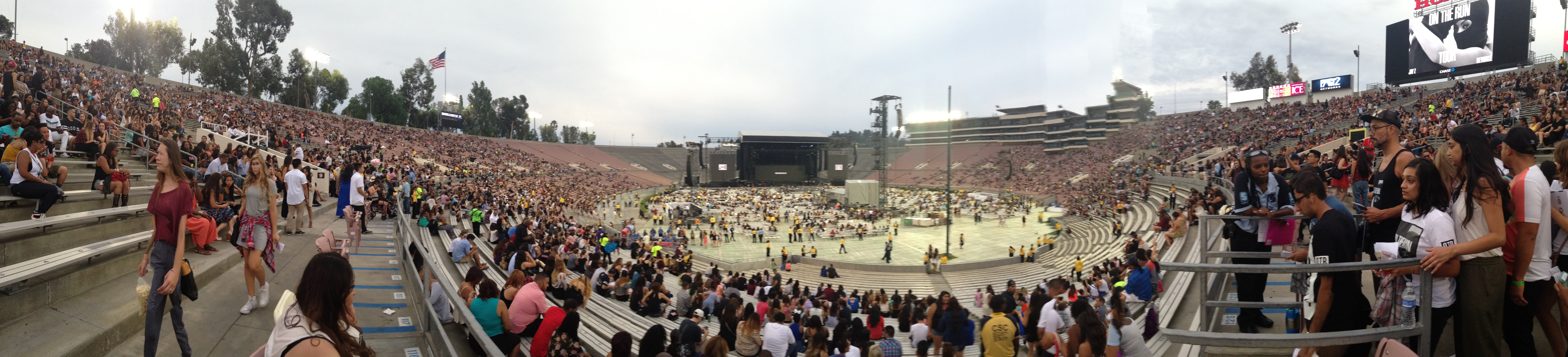
The Bowl filling up for Beyonce's On the Run Tour in 2014.

Date	Performer(s)	Opening act(s)	Tour/Event	Attendance	Notes
September 15, 1968	Big Brother and the Holding Company	—N/a	—N/a	—N/a	—N/a
June 6, 1982	Performers: Gil Scott-Heron Jesse Colin Young Graham Nash Bonnie Raitt Donovan Timothy B. Schmit Don Felder Crosby, Stills & Nash Stephen Stills Taj Mahal Stevie Wonder Joan Baez Bob Dylan Dan Fogelberg Stevie Nicks Linda Ronstadt Nicolette Larson Bette Midler Jackson Browne Gary U.S. Bonds Tom Petty	—N/a	Peace Sunday: We Have a Dream	—N/a	—N/a
July 2, 1982	Journey	Blue Öyster Cult; Triumph; Aldo Nova	Escape Tour	83,214	—N/a
August 1, 1982	Performers: Stevie Wonder Aretha Franklin Quincy Jones Patti Austin James Ingram Ashford & Simpson Luther Vandross Maze with Frankie Beverly Third World	—N/a	Budweiser Superfest 1982	—N/a	—N/a
June 18, 1988	Depeche Mode	Orchestral Manoeuvres in the Dark; Thomas Dolby; Wire; Pet Shop Boys	Music for the Masses Tour	60,000 - 80,000	The concert was filmed and recorded for the group's documentary-concert film and live album 101.
June 27, 1992	The Cure	Cranes; Dinosaur Jr.	Wish Tour	35,000	The show attracted the lowest attendance for a single concert in the history of the stadium.
October 3, 1992	Metallica; Guns N' Roses	Motörhead	Guns N' Roses/Metallica Stadium Tour	68,639	Comedian Andrew Dice Clay opened for Guns N' Roses and introduced the band when they came onstage.
January 31, 1993	Michael Jackson	—N/a	Super Bowl XXVII halftime show	—N/a	—N/a
July 31, 1993	Juan Gabriel	—N/a	—N/a	—N/a	Becomes the first Latin American singer to perform at the Rose Bowl.
April 16, 1994	Pink Floyd	—N/a	The Division Bell Tour	129,060	The band became the first ever act to perform two consecutive nights at the stadium.
April 17, 1994	Pink Floyd	—N/a	The Division Bell Tour	129,060	The band became the first ever act to perform two consecutive nights at the stadium.
July 17, 1994	Kenny G Whitney Houston	—N/a	1994 FIFA World Cup closing ceremony	—N/a	—N/a
October 19, 1994	The Rolling Stones	Red Hot Chili Peppers; Buddy Guy	Voodoo Lounge Tour	119,140	
October 21, 1994	The Rolling Stones	Red Hot Chili Peppers; Buddy Guy	Voodoo Lounge Tour	119,140	
January 21, 1995	Eagles	Sheryl Crow	Hell Freezes Over Tour	60,000	—N/a
June 27, 1998	Lilith Fair	—N/a	1998 Tour	—N/a	—N/a
July 10, 1999	Jennifer Lopez	—N/a	1999 FIFA Women's World Cup closing ceremony	—N/a	—N/a
July 17, 1999	Lilith Fair	—N/a	1999 Tour	—N/a	—N/a
June 9, 2000	'N Sync	Pink	No Strings Attached Tour	—N/a	—N/a
July 24, 2001	'N Sync	Eden's Crush; Samantha Mumba	PopOdyssey	62,196	—N/a
June 15, 2002	Various artists	—N/a	Wango Tango	—N/a	—N/a
May 17, 2003	Various artists	—N/a	Wango Tango	—N/a	—N/a
May 15, 2004	Various artists	—N/a	Wango Tango	—N/a	—N/a
October 25, 2009	U2	The Black Eyed Peas	U2 360° Tour	97,014	The concert was streamed on the group's official YouTube channel, and also filmed for the band's concert film U2360° at the Rose Bowl. The show also attracted the highest attendance for a single concert in the history of the stadium.
July 28, 2013	Justin Timberlake; Jay-Z	DJ Cassidy	Legends of the Summer	63,162	—N/a
August 2, 2014	Beyoncé; Jay-Z	—N/a	On the Run Tour	96,994	—N/a
August 3, 2014	Beyoncé; Jay-Z	—N/a	On the Run Tour	96,994	—N/a
August 7, 2014	Eminem; Rihanna	—N/a	The Monster Tour	110,346	—N/a
August 8, 2014	Eminem; Rihanna	—N/a	The Monster Tour	110,346	—N/a
September 11, 2014	One Direction	5 Seconds of Summer; Jamie Scott	Where We Are Tour	165,170	During the performance on September 13, the band performed a cover of "Happy Birthday" by Mildred J. Hill dedicated to Niall; and also of "I Gotta Feeling" by The Black Eyed Peas, "Beautiful Girls" by Sean Kingston, "Stand by Me" by Ben E. King and "Rock Your Body" by Justin Timberlake, along with a snippet of "I Want". The band also became the first ever act to perform three consecutive nights at the stadium.
September 12, 2014	One Direction	5 Seconds of Summer; Jamie Scott	Where We Are Tour	165,170	During the performance on September 13, the band performed a cover of "Happy Birthday" by Mildred J. Hill dedicated to Niall; and also of "I Gotta Feeling" by The Black Eyed Peas, "Beautiful Girls" by Sean Kingston, "Stand by Me" by Ben E. King and "Rock Your Body" by Justin Timberlake, along with a snippet of "I Want". The band also became the first ever act to perform three consecutive nights at the stadium.
September 13, 2014	One Direction	5 Seconds of Summer; Jamie Scott	Where We Are Tour	165,170	During the performance on September 13, the band performed a cover of "Happy Birthday" by Mildred J. Hill dedicated to Niall; and also of "I Gotta Feeling" by The Black Eyed Peas, "Beautiful Girls" by Sean Kingston, "Stand by Me" by Ben E. King and "Rock Your Body" by Justin Timberlake, along with a snippet of "I Want". The band also became the first ever act to perform three consecutive nights at the stadium.
July 25, 2015	Kenny Chesney; Jason Aldean	Brantley Gilbert; Cole Swindell; Old Dominion	The Big Revival Tour; Burn It Down Tour	53,864	—N/a
May 14, 2016	Beyoncé	DJ Khaled	The Formation World Tour	55,736	Big Sean, Yo Gotti, Ne-Yo, Ty Dolla Sign, Fat Joe, Remy Ma, Trey Songz, and Snoop Dogg joined DJ Khaled during the opening act. Beyoncé becomes the first female headliner at the stadium.
August 20, 2016	Coldplay	Bishop Briggs; Alessia Cara; Stargate	A Head Full of Dreams Tour	120,062	The concert was streamed in China and the Philippines.
August 21, 2016	Coldplay	Bishop Briggs; Alessia Cara	A Head Full of Dreams Tour	120,062	—N/a
May 20, 2017	U2	The Lumineers	The Joshua Tree Tour 2017	123,164	—N/a
May 21, 2017	U2	The Lumineers	The Joshua Tree Tour 2017	123,164	—N/a
July 29, 2017	Metallica	Avenged Sevenfold; Gojira	WorldWired Tour	60,509	—N/a
September 16, 2017	Green Day	Catfish and the Bottlemen	Revolution Radio Tour	36,912	
October 6, 2017	Coldplay	Tove Lo; Alina Baraz	A Head Full of Dreams Tour	64,442	The proceeds from these shows went towards the relief efforts for the Central Mexico earthquake.
May 18, 2018	Taylor Swift	Camila Cabello; Charli XCX	Reputation Stadium Tour	118,084	Shawn Mendes was the surprise guest. Swift performed "There's Nothing Holdin' Me Back" with Shawn.
May 19, 2018	Taylor Swift	Camila Cabello; Charli XCX	Reputation Stadium Tour	118,084	Troye Sivan and Selena Gomez were the surprise guests. Swift performed "My My My!" with Troye and "Hands To Myself" with Selena.
August 18, 2018	Ed Sheeran	Snow Patrol; Anne-Marie	÷ Tour	62,321	—N/a
September 22, 2018	Beyoncé; Jay-Z	Chloe X Halle and DJ Khaled	On the Run II Tour	106,550	—N/a
September 23, 2018	Beyoncé; Jay-Z	Chloe X Halle and DJ Khaled	On the Run II Tour	106,550	—N/a
May 4, 2019	BTS	—N/a	BTS World Tour Love Yourself: Speak Yourself	113,040	Becomes the first South Korean act to perform at The Rose Bowl.
May 5, 2019	BTS	—N/a	BTS World Tour Love Yourself: Speak Yourself	113,040	Becomes the first South Korean act to perform at The Rose Bowl.
August 22, 2019	The Rolling Stones	Kaleo	No Filter Tour	56,974	This concert was originally scheduled to take place on May 11, 2019.
November 15, 2020	For King & Country	—N/a	A Drummer Boy Christmas Tour	—	—N/a
August 18, 2023	Karol G	Agudelo; Young Miko	Mañana Será Bonito Tour	115,703 / 115,703	$25,446,544
August 19, 2023	Karol G	Agudelo	Mañana Será Bonito Tour	115,703 / 115,703	$25,446,544
September 30, 2023	Coldplay	H.E.R. 070 Shake	Music of the Spheres World Tour	136,043 / 136,043	Two Los Angeles shows were originally going to be played at SoFi Stadium in Inglewood, but were cancelled due to production issues and were eventually rescheduled for the Rose Bowl over a year later.
October 1, 2023	Coldplay	H.E.R. 070 Shake	Music of the Spheres World Tour	136,043 / 136,043	Two Los Angeles shows were originally going to be played at SoFi Stadium in Inglewood, but were cancelled due to production issues and were eventually rescheduled for the Rose Bowl over a year later.
April 18, 2025	AC/DC	The Pretty Reckless	Power Up Tour	—	—
September 6, 2025	Oasis	Cage the Elephant	Oasis Live '25 Tour	—N/a	—N/a
September 7, 2025	Oasis	Cage the Elephant	Oasis Live '25 Tour	—N/a	—N/a
August 15, 2026	Noah Kahan	Gigi Perez Annabelle Dinda	The Great Divide Tour	56,000 / 56,000	—
September 5, 2026	Guns N' Roses	Ice Cube	2026 World Tour	—	—
April 23, 2027	Harry Styles	Kylie Minogue	Together, Together	—	—
April 24, 2027	Harry Styles	Kylie Minogue	Together, Together	—	—
April 30, 2027	Harry Styles	Kylie Minogue	Together, Together	—	—
May 1, 2027	Harry Styles	Kylie Minogue	Together, Together	—	—

=== Other events ===
The stadium was used for midget car racing in the 1940s and early 1950s.

The Rose Bowl was home to the World Frisbee Championships from 1974 to 1982. The first year featured Guts Frisbee and the initial demonstration of the new Frisbee Game, Ultimate.

The stadium held its first country music festival in June 1981, named A Day in the Country. The event was produced by Richard Flanzer of AtlanticPacific Music.

In August 2007, the stadium hosted the 2007 Drum Corps International World Championships. The Rose Bowl was the final stadium to host the championship before DCI moved their corporate offices to Indianapolis with the championships being held at Lucas Oil Stadium until at least 2028. This was the first (and only) time the DCI championships had ever been held west of Denver, Colorado in the 52-year history of DCI.

It hosted auditions for the top American television show, American Idol, on August 8, 2006. The stadium has also been used as part of the music video shoot for the song "The Last Song", the second single released by the American rock band the All-American Rejects, which features the band performing the song in the middle of the stadium to an empty crowd.

The stadium's Court of Champions was the site of a "Roadblock" from seventeenth season of the CBS reality TV show The Amazing Race where teams had to help decorate three sections of the theme float for the 2011 New Year's Day Rose Parade.

In November 1997, the International Churches of Christ (Los Angeles) gathered at the Rose Bowl for their Worship Service, with an attendance of 17,000.

The Brookside Golf Course hosted the Los Angeles Open on the PGA Tour in 1968, won by Billy Casper in late January.

The Rose Bowl was used for high school graduation ceremonies for the Alhambra Unified School District's Alhambra High School, Mark Keppel High School and San Gabriel High School on May 27, 2021, La Cañada Unified School District's La Cañada High School on June 3, 2021, and Glendale Unified School District's Glendale High School and Herbert Hoover High School on June 10, 2021, and Crescenta Valley High School on June 11, 2021, instead of holding at their respective campuses due to the COVID-19 restrictions.

== Present status ==
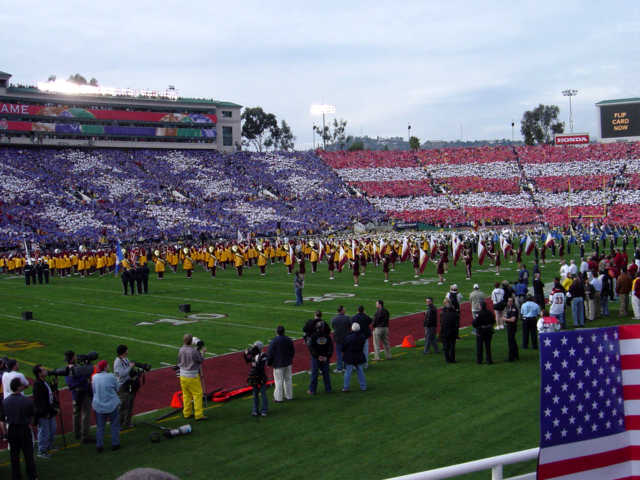
Large card stunt performed at the 2004 Rose Bowl Game viewed from the Southeast corner

The Rose Bowl and adjacent golf course are managed by the Rose Bowl Operating Company, a non-profit organization whose board is selected by council members of the City of Pasadena. UCLA and the Pasadena Tournament of Roses also have one member on the company board. In 2007 it was reported that Rose Bowl stadium itself runs on a yearly operational loss. While it generated funds with the annual lease with UCLA ($1.5 million), the Tournament of Roses ($900,000), and a regularly hosted flea market ($900,000), it makes up the loss by relying on funds generated by the adjacent city-owned golf course ($2 million).

The stadium at the time was unable to finance many of the capital improvements it needed to be considered a modern facility, including new seats, wider aisles, additional exits, a wider concourse, a renovated press box, a state-of-the-art video scoreboard, new field lighting, ribbon boards, extra suites and a club. The estimated cost for such improvements ranges from $250 million and $300 million. The stadium had long-term leases with its two major tenants, the Pasadena Tournament of Roses (2019) and UCLA (2023).

In 2006, the Rose Bowl and the City of Pasadena launched a $16.3 million capital improvement program that benefited both UCLA and the Tournament of Roses. New locker rooms for both UCLA and visiting teams, as well as a new media interview area were constructed. The USC Athletic department attempted to negotiate with the Rose Bowl to play games there in 2007, out of concerns that the Los Angeles Coliseum Commission would not negotiate, in a decade-long rent impasse between the commission and the university.

In April 2009, the Rose Bowl Operating Company unveiled a Rose Bowl Strategic Plan, which addressed the objectives to improve public safety, enhance fan experience, maintain national historic landmark status, develop revenue sources to fund long-term improvements, and enhance facility operations. In October 2010, the Pasadena City Council approved a $152 million financing plan for the major renovation of the stadium.

Groundbreaking ceremonies for the first of three phases of the project were held in January 2011. The newly constructed video board was used for the June 2011, CONCACAF Gold Cup Final. The costs increased as the project went on, and by December 2012 were estimated at $194 million and the project was to be completed by 2015. The Rose Bowl and UCLA leases were extended to 2043 and 2044 respectively. The renovations were completed in 2016.

In 2019, the Rose Bowl reported a profit of $335,000. However, golf course usage has declined year after year, and UCLA football attendance has waned. The stadium reported $211.8 million in outstanding debt at the beginning of 2020. The Rose Bowl is limited by law to 15 events per year with more than 20,000 in attendance. It can host an unlimited number of small events, such as weddings, for which it made $1.5 million in 2019. The inside and outside of the stadium have served as a backdrop for advertisements and commercials.

In 2024, Stephen A. Smith proposed moving the Rose Bowl Game from the Rose Bowl. His argument was that traffic to and from the stadium was unacceptable, such that it took too long for fans to arrive at the stadium and leave in a timely manner. He proposed using SoFi Stadium because it has much better supporting infrastructure and location in Inglewood. This was immediately slammed by college football fans calling it the worst take of all time, noting the Rose Bowl as an important site in the history of both college and professional sports. In December 2024, it was announced that the Rose Bowl would be renovated to prepare for the 2028 Summer Olympics by adding one of the largest video boards, field level clubs, improved seats, and new field level clubs.

== Notable dates ==
=== Seating and attendance records ===
- Rose Bowl Game records: 1973 Rose Bowl, January 1, 1973, Attendance: 106,869. Number 1 ranked and undefeated USC vs. number 3 Ohio State. This is the stadium record, as well as the NCAA bowl game record. The smallest Rose Bowl game crowd in the stadium was the 1934 Rose Bowl with 35,000 in attendance to see Columbia defeat Stanford. Three days of rain had turned the stadium into a small lake, and it rained on New Year's Day in 1934, one of the few times in the history of the tournament. The largest crowd to watch a Rose Bowl Game after the 1998 Rose Bowl and seating reconfiguration, was 96,371 in the 2024 Rose Bowl.
- NFL Super Bowl record: Super Bowl XIV, Pittsburgh Steelers – Los Angeles Rams, January 20, 1980, Attendance: 103,985. This is an NFL postseason record. This also stood as an overall NFL record until broken by a 1994 preseason game played at Estadio Azteca (Aztec Stadium) in Mexico City.
- 1984 Summer Olympics (Games of the XXIII Olympiad) Football (Soccer) Tournament – France defeated Brazil 2–0 in the final to win the gold medal on August 11. The attendance was 101,799, setting a record for the largest crowd for a soccer game held in the United States (since broken by a 2014 Manchester United-Real Madrid exhibition at the Michigan Stadium in Ann Arbor, Michigan, which drew 109,318). The attendance was also the Olympic football record until the final of the 2000 Olympic Football Tournament at the Stadium Australia in Sydney, which drew 104,098.
- College football regular season record: UCLA–USC, November 19, 1988, Attendance: 100,741. Undefeated second-ranked USC (9–0) and quarterback Rodney Peete met sixth-ranked UCLA (9–1) and quarterback Troy Aikman with a berth in the Rose Bowl Game on the line. Since the 1998 renovations, the largest regular season crowd was for the 2002 UCLA–USC game, with an attendance of 91,084. The largest attendance for a UCLA game, with an opponent other than USC, was 88,804, for the 2000 game against the Michigan Wolverines. The lowest attendance with fans in seats for a UCLA regular season game was 27,143, against Bowling Green on September 3, 2022. The Bruins' record for lowest attendance record for a conference opponent is 32,513 for a game against Oregon State on November 7, 1992. The first game played at the Rose Bowl, on October 28, 1922, between USC and Cal had an attendance of 35,000. All four UCLA home games during the 2020 football season, including the USC game, had an official attendance of zero, due to restrictions from the COVID-19 pandemic.
- Professional soccer record: June 16, 1996: In a doubleheader witnessed by 92,216 fans, the U.S. men's national team played Mexico for the championship of the 1996 U.S. Cup, followed by the MLS conference leaders Los Angeles Galaxy vs. Tampa Bay Mutiny. The crowd was the largest ever to see a U.S. professional soccer league game.
- 1994 FIFA World Cup: The final, held on July 17, saw Brazil defeat Italy 3–2 after a penalty shootout. Attendance was 94,194.
- 1999 FIFA Women's World Cup: The final on July 10, 1999, was the most-attended women's sports event in history with an official attendance of 90,185. The USA defeated China 5–4 in a penalty shootout.
- 2011 CONCACAF Gold Cup: 93,420 fans saw Mexico defeat the United States 4–2 in the 2011 Gold Cup championship game on June 25, 2011.
- Soccer, exhibition match: A sold-out crowd of 93,702 people attended the July 30, 2022, friendly between Real Madrid and Juventus. On August 1, 2009, an attendance of 93,137 showed up when FC Barcelona defeated the Los Angeles Galaxy 2–1 in an exhibition, making it the largest soccer attendance in the United States since the 1994 World Cup.
- Concert: British-Irish boy band One Direction played three sold-out nights at the Rose Bowl in September 2014 on the same tour, making them the first act ever to accomplish this.
- MLS single-game record: On July 4, 2023, the postponed 20th El Tráfico derby match between Los Angeles Galaxy and Los Angeles FC broke MLS single-game attendance record with 82,110 people. The game ended in a 2–1 victory for the Galaxy.

=== Other notable dates ===
- November 17, 2012: The Rose Bowl press box became known as the Terry Donahue Pavilion in the fall, 2013. Donahue is the winningest coach in the history of the Pac-12 Conference (known as the Pacific-10 during his coaching career).
- July 7, 2013: A record 566 mariachis performed at the half-time of the first round 2013 Gold Cup game between Mexico and Panama.

== Statues ==
- Jackie Robinson
- Keith Jackson
- Brandi Chastain and the 1999 U.S. Women's World Cup team
- Terry Donahue

== See also ==
- List of NCAA Division I FBS football stadiums
- Lists of stadiums
