= 1921 California Golden Bears football team =

American college football season

1921 California Golden Bears football

National champion (Billingsley MOV, CFRA, Sagarin) Co-national champion (Boand) PCC champion

Rose Bowl, T 0–0 vs. Washington & Jefferson
- Conference: Pacific Coast Conference
- Record: 9–0–1 (4–0 PCC)
- Head coach: Andy Smith (6th season)
- Offensive scheme: Short-punt
- Captain: George H. Latham
- Home stadium: California Field

Uniform
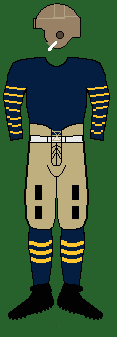

1921 Pacific Coast Conference football standings
	Conf.					Overall
Team	W		L		T	W		L		T
California $	4	–	0	–	0	9	–	0	–	1
Washington State	2	–	1	–	1	4	–	2	–	1
Stanford	1	–	1	–	1	4	–	2	–	2
Oregon Agricultural	1	–	2	–	1	4	–	3	–	2
Oregon	0	–	1	–	2	5	–	1	–	3
Washington	0	–	3	–	1	3	–	4	–	1
$ – Conference champion

The 1921 California Golden Bears football team, also known as the Wonder Team, was an American football team that represented the University of California, Berkeley in the Pacific Coast Conference (PCC) during the 1921 college football season. In their sixth year under head coach Andy Smith, the team compiled a 9–0–1 record (4–0 against PCC opponents), won the PCC championship, and outscored its opponents by a combined total of 312 to 33. In the postseason, the Golden Bears played a scoreless tie against Washington & Jefferson in the rain-soaked 1922 Rose Bowl.

There was no contemporaneous system in 1921 for determining a national champion. However, California was retroactively named as the national champion for 1921 by the Billingsley Report (using its alternative "margin of victory" methodology), College Football Researchers Association, and Jeff Sagarin, and as a co-national champion under the Boand System.

Two California players, end Harold "Brick" Miller and tackle Dan McMillan, were consensus first-team picks on the 1921 All-America college football team.

Additionally, California took eight of eleven first-team spots on the United Press' 1921 All-Pacific Coast football team: quarterback Charles F. Erb; halfback Crip Toomey; fullback Archie Nisbet; ends Robert E. Berkey and Howard Stephens; tackle Dan McMillan; and guards Webster V. Clark and Lee D. Cramer.

== Schedule ==
Date	Opponent	Site	Result	Attendance	Source
September 24	Saint Mary's*	California Field; Berkeley, CA	W 21–0	15,000	
October 1	Olympic Club*	California Field; Berkeley, CA	W 14–0		
October 8	Nevada*	California Field; Berkeley, CA	W 51–6		
October 15	Pacific Fleet*	California Field; Berkeley, CA	W 21–10		
October 22	Oregon	California Field; Berkeley, CA	W 39–0		
October 29	vs. Washington State	Multnomah Field; Portland, OR	W 14–0	11,000–12,000	
November 5	USC*	California Field; Berkeley, CA	W 38–7	30,000	
November 12	Washington	California Field; Berkeley, CA	W 72–3	6,000	
November 19	at Stanford	Stanford Stadium; Stanford, CA (Big Game)	W 42–7	57,000	
January 2, 1922	vs. Washington & Jefferson*	Tournament Park; Pasadena, CA (Rose Bowl)	T 0–0	40,000	
*Non-conference game

== Roster ==
- Stanley Barnes, T
- Beam, T
- Bell, HB
- Robert E. Berkey, E
- Webster V. Clark, G
- Cline, QB
- Lee D. Cranmer, G
- Dean, T
- Dunn, HB
- Walter Eells, HB
- Charles F. Erb, QB
- Karl Engebretson, E
- Gallagher, C
- Hufford, E
- George H. Latham, C
- Dan McMillan, T
- Morrison, FB
- Harold Muller, E
- Donald Nichols, HB
- Archie Nesbit, FB
- O'Brien, QB
- Pearce, E
- Perry, FB
- Shuur, G
- Brodie Stephens, E
- Crip Toomey, HB
- Van Sant, HB
