= Harold Muller =

American sportsman (1901–1962)

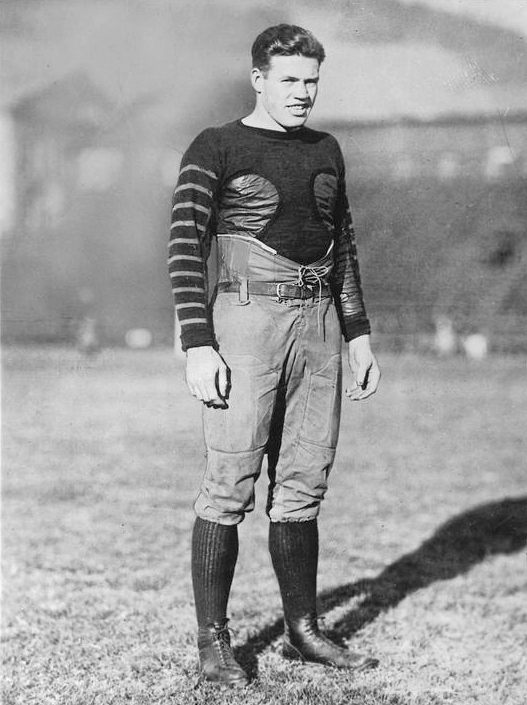

No. 88
- Position: End

Personal information
- Born: June 12, 1901; Dunsmuir, California, U.S.
- Died: May 17, 1962 (aged 60); Berkeley, California, U.S.

Career information
- High school: San Diego High School
- College: California

Career history

Playing
- 1926: Los Angeles Buccaneers

Coaching
- 1926: Los Angeles Buccaneers

Awards and highlights
- First-team All-Pro (1926); 3× National champion (1920, 1921, 1922); 2× Consensus All-American (1921, 1922); Third-team All-American (1920); 2× First-team All-Pacific Coast (1920, 1922); Rose Bowl MVP (1921); Breitbard Hall of Fame (1953); Coaching record: 6–3–1
- Coaching profile at Pro Football Reference
- Stats at Pro Football Reference
- College Football Hall of Fame (Class of 1951)

Other information
- Military career
- Allegiance: United States
- Branch: U.S. Army
- Service years: 1942–1946
- Rank: Major
- Unit: Army Medical School
- Conflicts: World War II

Olympic medal record

Men's athletics

Representing the United States
Silver medal – second place	1920 Antwerp	High jump

Harold Powers "Brick" Muller (June 12, 1901 – May 17, 1962) was an American professional football player-coach for the Los Angeles Buccaneers during their only season in the National Football League (NFL) in 1926. He was also a track and field athlete who competed mainly in the high jump. Muller competed for the United States in the 1920 Summer Olympics held in Antwerp, Belgium, in the high jump, where he won the silver medal. He got nicknamed "the Brick" because of his flaming red hair.

== Football ==
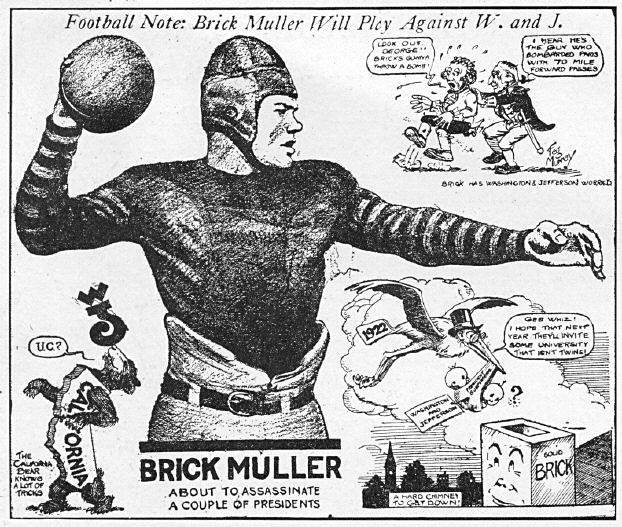
Brick depicted vs. W&J.

Muller attended San Diego High School. When Nibs Price was hired by Cal coach Andy Smith as one of his University of California, Berkeley assistants, he encouraged his San Diego High School players to accompany him to Berkeley. Muller and six other graduates from San Diego High School later played on Cal's undefeated, untied 1920 "Wonder Team". In the 1921 Rose Bowl, he completed a touchdown pass to Brodie Stephens that went at least 53 yards in the air. He was later voted the Most Valuable Player of the game. Muller became a star end at Cal and was the first player in the western United States to receive All-American honors in 1921 and 1922.

== Track and field ==
Muller was also a member of the California track and field team. The Bears won the ICAAAA championships in 1921, 1922, and 1923, and also won the second NCAA championships. Muller placed second in the Broad jump, third in the High Jump, and fourth in the Discus Throw.

== Los Angeles Buccaneers ==
After graduating from Cal, Muller wanted to become an orthopedic surgeon. He was accepted into the University of California's Medical School, but was in need of money. To help supplement his income while in medical school, Andy Smith hired Muller to coach the ends on the Cal varsity. While in school Muller coached from 1923 to 1925, until Smith died from pneumonia in 1926. After he became a physician, Brick played in the first East-West Shrine Game. Prior to the game, he caught a pass thrown from atop the Telephone Building—a drop of 320 feet (97.5 m). During the game, he caught a 27-yard pass for a touchdown. Ed R. Hughes of the San Francisco Chronicle wrote in his column: "Remember Muller has been out of college for three years, but right now he is by far the greatest end in the West, and probably one of the best that ever played!!" This led to Muller being signed by the Los Angeles Buccaneers. He soon became the player and head coach of the team. He led the Buccaneers to a 6-3-1 record in 1926. The team later folded in 1927.

== After football ==
After playing with the Buccaneers in 1926, Muller became an orthopedic surgeon. During World War II Muller served with the Army Medical School with the rank of major, and in 1956 he served as the Head Team Physician for the United States Olympic Team. However, the honors kept coming. In the late 1940s, Collier's magazine senior editor James N. Young, who had compiled All-America data for almost half a century, chose Muller on his All-Time All-America eleven.

In 1953, Muller was also inducted by the San Diego Hall of Champions into the Breitbard Hall of Fame honoring San Diego's finest athletes both on and off the playing surface. and the College Football Hall of Fame in 1951.

== Brick Muller Award ==
The Brick Muller Award, established in 1949, is named in honor of Muller. It is presented to the most valuable lineman on the Cal team. Players who won the award three times include Ralph DeLoach, E (defense; 1977–79), Harvey Salem, T (offense; 1980–82), Majett Whiteside, NG (defense; 1985–87); Andre Carter, DE (defense; 1998–2000), and Mitchell Schwartz, left tackle (offense; 2009–11).
