= 1921 Oregon Agricultural Aggies football team =

American college football season

1921 Oregon Agricultural Aggies football
- Head coach Dick Rutherford
- Conference: Northwest Conference, Pacific Coast Conference
- Record: 4–3–2 (1–1–1 Northwest, 1–2–1 PCC)
- Head coach: Dick Rutherford (2nd season)
- Captain: Gap Powell
- Home stadium: Bell Field

1921 Northwest Conference football standings
	Conf.					Overall
Team	W		L		T	W		L		T
Whitman $	3	–	0	–	0	4	–	2	–	0
Washington State	2	–	0	–	1	4	–	2	–	1
Oregon	1	–	0	–	3	5	–	1	–	3
Oregon Agricultural	1	–	1	–	1	4	–	3	–	2
Idaho	1	–	2	–	1	4	–	3	–	1
Montana	0	–	2	–	0	3	–	3	–	1
Willamette	0	–	3	–	0	1	–	5	–	0
$ – Conference champion

1921 Pacific Coast Conference football standings
	Conf.					Overall
Team	W		L		T	W		L		T
California $	4	–	0	–	0	9	–	0	–	1
Washington State	2	–	1	–	1	4	–	2	–	1
Stanford	1	–	1	–	1	4	–	2	–	2
Oregon Agricultural	1	–	2	–	1	4	–	3	–	2
Oregon	0	–	1	–	2	5	–	1	–	3
Washington	0	–	3	–	1	3	–	4	–	1
$ – Conference champion

The 1921 Oregon Agricultural Aggies football team represented Oregon Agricultural College (OAC)—now known as Oregon State University—as a member of the Northwest Conference and the Pacific Coast Conference (PCC) during the 1921 college football season. In their second season under head coach Dick Rutherford, the Aggies compiled an overall record of 4–3–2 and outscored their opponents, 231 to 42. Oregon Agricultural had a record of 1–1–1 in Northwest Conference play and 1–2–1 against PCC opponents, placing fourth in both conferences.

Team captain fullback Gap Powell was selected as an All-American by Football World and Athletic World. The team played home games at Bell Field in Corvallis, Oregon.

== Background ==
The 1921 football season was deemed a financial success by J.J. Richardson, general manager of student affairs at OAC. Total receipts for the year were $25,378.41 — an increase of more than $5,000 from 1920. Expenses, including travel costs and advertising, topped $12,000. The windfall was attributed to solid attendances at home games against major opponents, while early-season match ups with Chemawa Indian School and the Multnomah Athletic Club were played "without profits," it was noted.

== Schedule ==
Date	Opponent	Site	Result	Attendance	Source
September 24	O.A.C. Rooks*	Bell Field; Corvallis, OR	W 68–7		
October 1	Chemawa*	Bell Field; Corvallis, OR	W 68–0		
October 8	Multnomah Athletic Club*	Bell Field; Corvallis, OR	T 7–7		
October 15	at Willamette	Sweetland Field; Salem, OR	W 54–0		
October 22	Washington	Bell Field; Corvallis, OR	W 24–0	6,500	
October 29	at Stanford	Stanford Field; Stanford, CA	L 7–14	10,000	
November 11	Washington State	Bell Field; Corvallis, OR	L 3–7		
November 19	at Oregon	Hayward Field; Eugene, OR (rivalry)	T 0–0	8,000	
November 26	at USC*	Tournament Park; Pasadena, CA	L 0–7		
*Non-conference game
