= Earl Leslie =

American football and basketball coach

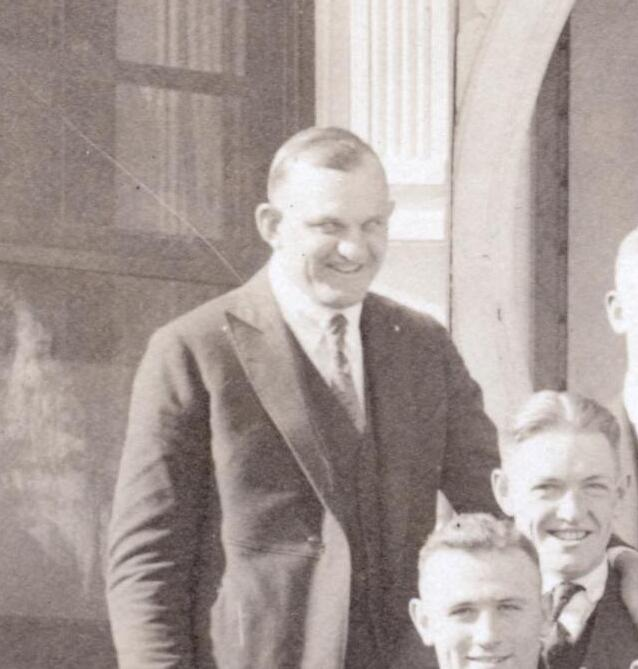

Playing career

Football
- 1919–1921: Oregon
- Position: Tackle

Coaching career (HC unless noted)

Football
- 1927: Oregon (assistant)
- 1930–1931: Montclair State

Basketball
- 1930–1932: Montclair State
- 1932–1936: Penn State

Head coaching record
- Overall: 4–5 (football); 41–47 (basketball)

Accomplishments and honors

Awards
- 2× First-team All-Pacific Coast (1920, 1921)

Earl E. Leslie was an American football and basketball coach. He served as the head football coach for the Montclair State University Red Hawks in Upper Montclair, New Jersey. In two seasons as head coach, he compiled a record of 4–5.

Leslie played for the University of Oregon Ducks football team from 1919 to 1921 and participated in the 1920 Rose Bowl, where Oregon lost to Harvard. He later became an assistant coach for his alma mater in both football and men's basketball.

Leslie was the men's basketball head coach at Montclair State from 1930 to 1932 and at Penn State from 1932 to 1936, compiling an overall basketball coaching record of 41–47.

== Head coaching record ==
=== Football ===
Year	Team	Overall	Conference	Standing	Bowl/playoffs
Montclair State Indians (Independent) (1930–1931)
1930	Montclair State	1–3			
1931	Montclair State	3–2			
Montclair State:		4–5			
Total:		4–5			

=== Basketball ===
Record table
Season	Team	Overall	Conference	Standing	Postseason
Monclair State (Independent) (1930–1932)
1930–31	Montclair State	3–12			
1931–32	Montclair State	9–7			
Penn State (Independent) (1932–1935)
1932–33	Penn State	7–4			
1933–34	Penn State	8–4			
1934–35	Penn State	8–9			
Penn State (Eastern Intercollegiate Conference) (1935–1936)
1935–36	Penn State	6–11	0–10	6th	
Montclair State:		12–19 (.387)			
Penn State:		29–28 (.509)	0–10 (.000)		
Total:		41–47 (.466)			
