= Dan McMillan =

American football player (1898–1975)

Profile
- Position: Tackle

Personal information
- Born: June 29, 1898; Springfield, Missouri
- Died: October 22, 1975 (aged 77); Los Gatos, California
- Listed height: 6 ft 1 in (1.85 m)
- Listed weight: 190 lb (86 kg)

Career information
- College: USC (1916–1917); California (1920–1921)

Awards and highlights
- 2× National champion (1920, 1921); Consensus All-American (1921); Second-team All-American (1920); 2× First-team All-PCC (1920, 1921); Cal Athletic Hall of Fame

Dan McMillan (June 29, 1898 – October 22, 1975) was an American football player. McMillan was a prominent tackle for the USC Trojans football teams of the University of Southern California for two seasons until his sporting career was interrupted by service in the First World War. He later transferred to Cal where he was selected All-American in 1921. He is a member of the Cal Athletic Hall of Fame. He was elected to the College Football Hall of Fame in 1971.
