= San Diego High School =

Public high school in San Diego, California, United States

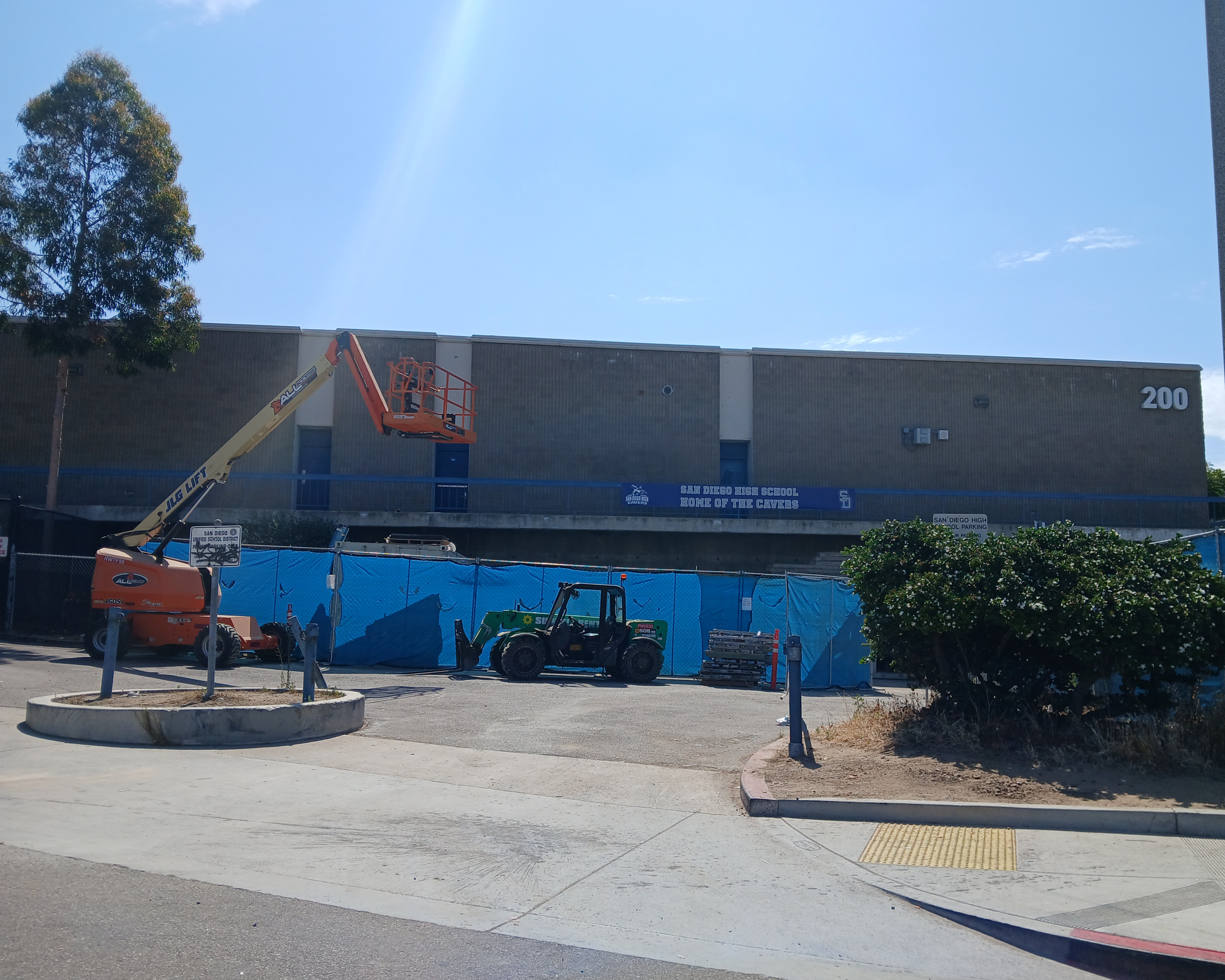
- San Diego High School, under construction in 2025

Location
- 1405 Park Blvd. San Diego, California 92101; United States; 32°43′14″N 117°9′9″W

Information
- Former names: Russ School (1882–1893); Russ High School (1893–1902)
- Type: Comprehensive public high school
- Established: 1882; 144 years ago
- School district: San Diego Unified School District
- CEEB code: 052885
- Grades: 9–12
- Enrollment: 1,636 (September 2024)
- Campus: Urban
- Colors: Royal blue and white
- Song: Hail Blue and White
- Athletics conference: CIF San Diego Section - City Conference
- Mascot: Caver
- Newspaper: The Russ
- Yearbook: The Grey Castle
- Website: www.sdhs.sandiegounified.org

San Diego High School (SDHS) is an urban public high school located on the southern edge of Balboa Park in San Diego, California, United States. It is the oldest high school in the San Diego Unified School District, one of the oldest public schools in California, and the oldest in the state still on its original site.

== History ==
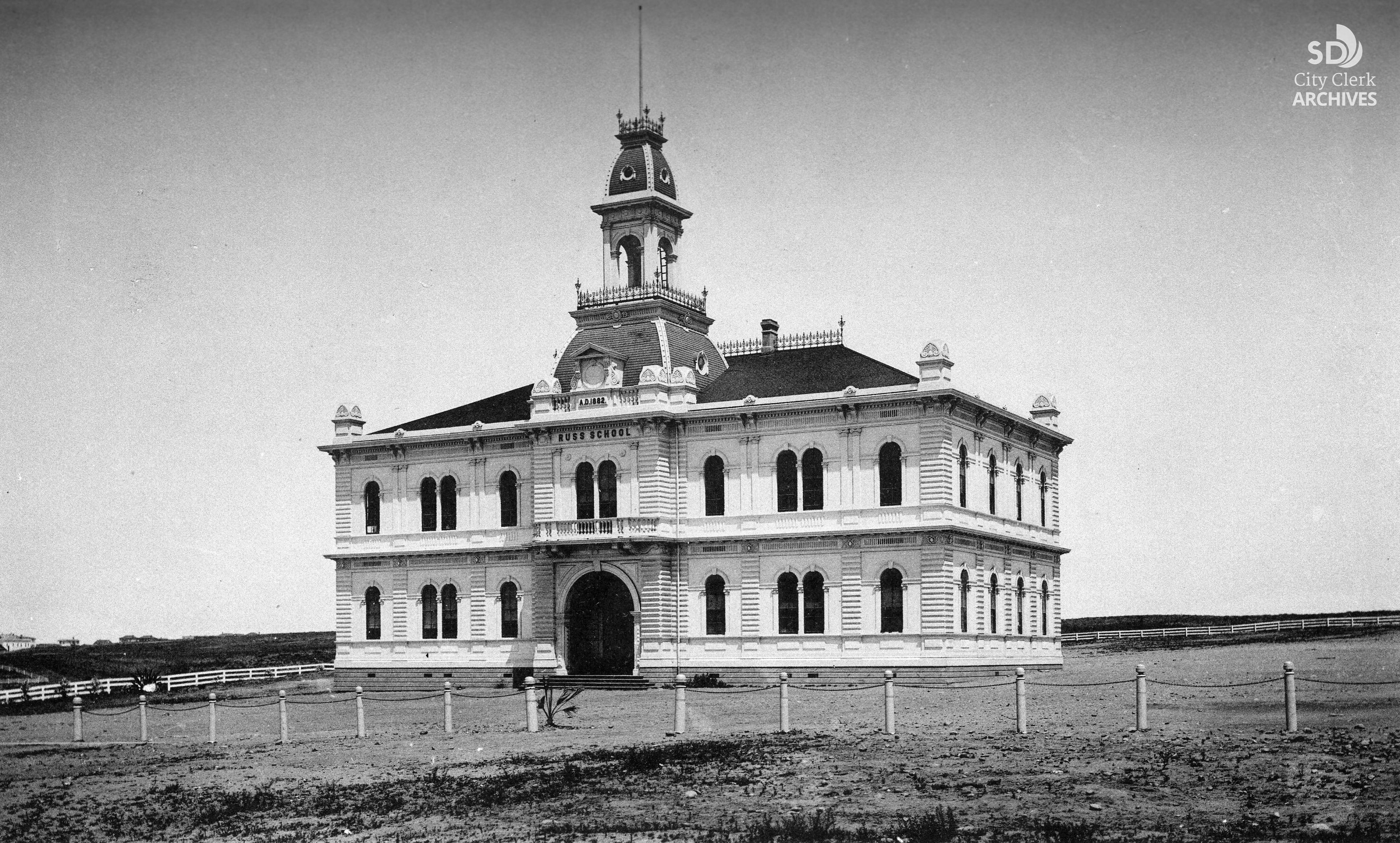
Russ High in c. 1880

=== Russ High (1882–1907) ===
By 1881, the population of William Heath's and Alonzo Horton's New San Diego, swelled to over 2,500 which quickly filled up the existing schools and necessitated the construntion of another. Voters then approved $12,000 ($400,345 in 2025) to construct the new school, which came to be named Russ School after lumberman Joseph Russ, who donated the lumber to build the school. The school was built in the Italian Villa style with a low-hip roof, ironwork parapet, and open-bell tower. It consisted of two stories and eight rooms. The school opened on August 14, 1882 to a class of 308 students from grades 1 through 8.

In 1888 a high school was added, with three teachers. The high school students took over the upper floor; elementary and primary students occupied the lower floor. The first commencement was held in 1889, with four students graduating. In 1891, the school held its inaugural football season, which unexpectedly led to the adoption of its official colors. With no proper jerseys available, athletes were instructed to wear white shirts. Every player coincidentally arrived also sporting blue jeans, which cemented the school's colors.

In 1893 high school students took over the entire school, which was renamed Russ High School. The school's newspaper The Russ published its first issue in 1889.

In 1906 the school building was moved several hundred feet to allow for the construction of a new school. The original building was stripped of its ornamentation and was used for storage, dressing rooms, and a cafeteria. It burned down in 1911.

=== The Grey Castle (1907–1973) ===
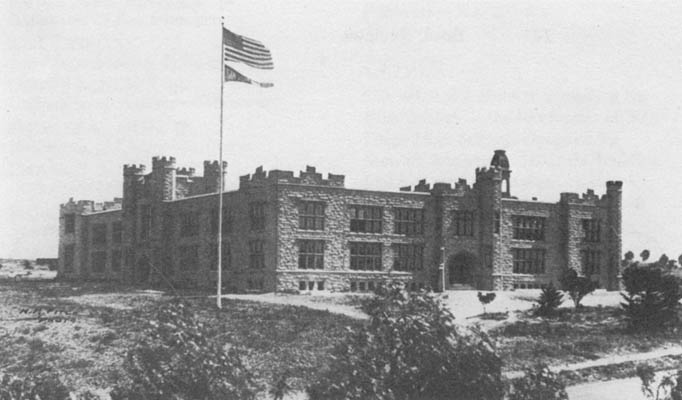
The Grey Castle, c.1908

By 1902 the school had become overcrowded and $133,000 ($4.95 million in 2025) in bonds was raised for a new high school. San Diego High School, was built on the original site, opening on April 13, 1907. The new building, designed by F.S. Allen, contained 65 rooms and was built in the Gothic Revival style, with towers flanking the entrances. It was built of brick with a veneer of granite. Students thought it resembled a castle and nicknamed it "The Grey Castle." It was later admitted that the design of The Grey Castle took inspiration from Joliet Prison in Illinois.

In 1913 a polytechnic school was added, with three additional Gothic-style buildings housing classes in manual arts, domestic arts, and fine arts. By 1913 there were 55 teachers and 1518 students. The school reached its peak attendance, 3327 students, in 1928.

Balboa Stadium, just east of the high school, was dedicated in 1915. The 2,500-seat Russ Auditorium, just south of the school, was dedicated on May 13, 1926.

In 1919, San Diego High School athletes adopted the nickname "Cavemen" (later known as Cavers). The nickname originated in 1919 when a Russ reporter noted that the football players emerging from the tunnel leading to Balboa Stadium resembled cavemen emerging from a cave.

=== Modern San Diego High (1973–2004) ===
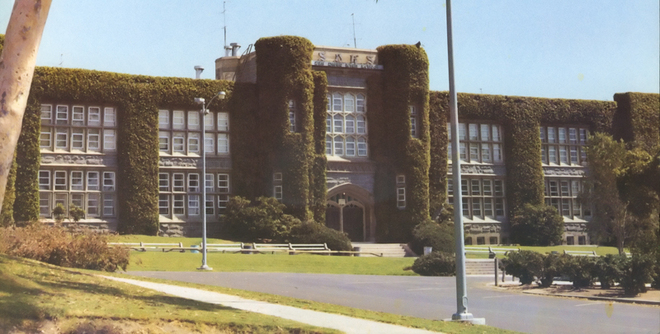
The Grey Castle with its mossy appearance, as it appeared before its demolition in 1975

To comply with California legislation in the 1960s that required all school districts to demolish or retrofit any school building built prior to 1933 for earthquake safety reasons, the "Grey Castle" building was torn down. The first of four buildings constructed prior to 1933 was torn down along with the Russ Auditorium in 1973; Building 101, the "original Grey Castle", was the last building to be torn down in 1975. It is said that when the wrecking ball came to demolish the "Grey Castle" to build a new earthquake-safe school, it took repeated attempts to bring the structure down. In the summer of 1973, contractors attempted to bring down the Russ Auditorium using explosives; portions of the building would not come down. It took an extra six months to finish the demolition of the auditorium.

The replacement building, consisting of four concrete-block buildings with blue trim, was re-dedicated on November 6, 1976. Gargoyles from the façade of Russ Auditorium can be seen in a fountain near the school entrance, and heavy carved doors from the "Gray Castle" were installed on the administration building.

=== "Six campuses" period (2004–2021) ===
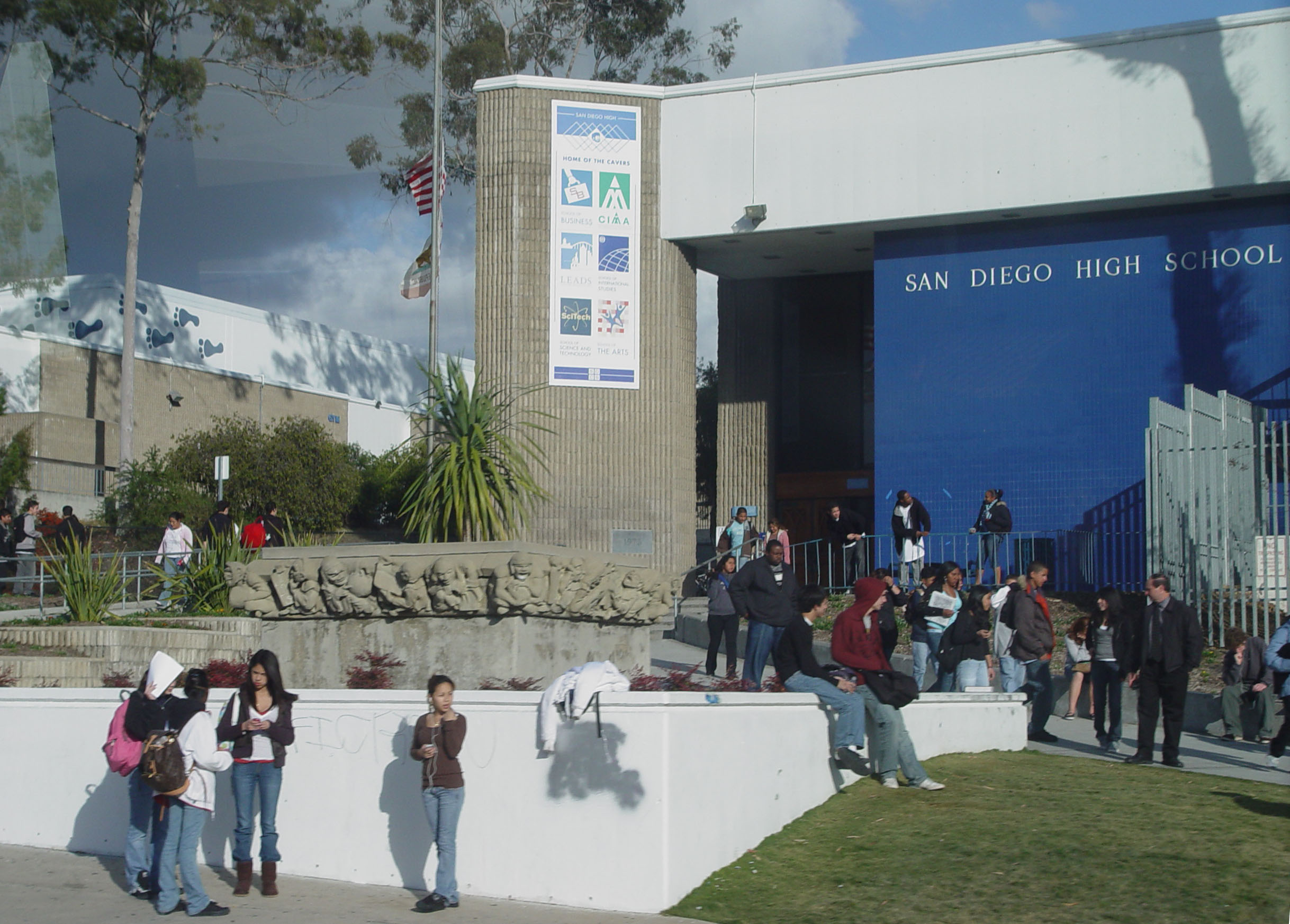
The (now former) 100 building, showing the logos of the six small schools

In June 2004, as part of the national "School-within-a-School" movement and with funding from the Bill and Melinda Gates Foundation, San Diego High School was divided into six thematic schools, collectively called the San Diego High Educational Complex. Each of the six schools of approximately 500 students had its own administration and staff: The schools were:

- School of International Studies (incorporating an existing International Baccalaureate program)
- Lead, Explore, Achieve, Discover and Serve High School (LEADS)
- School of Business
- School of Science and Technology (SciTech)
- School of Media, Visual and Performing Arts (MVPA; School of the Arts)
- School of Communication Investigations in a Multicultural Atmosphere (CIMA)

In approximately 2009, the School of Communication shut down due to an insufficient number of students. In 2013 the School of Business and the School of LEADS combined to form the School of Business and Leadership, leaving four academies. At the end of the 2014–2015 academic year the art academy was also closed down. For the 2015–2016 school year, the campus was reunited under a single principal, with the three remaining academies – International Studies, Business, and Science and Technology – each functioning under a vice principal. In 2021, the three remaining schools were merged back into a single school, while still offering its International Baccalaureate and California Partnership Academy programs.

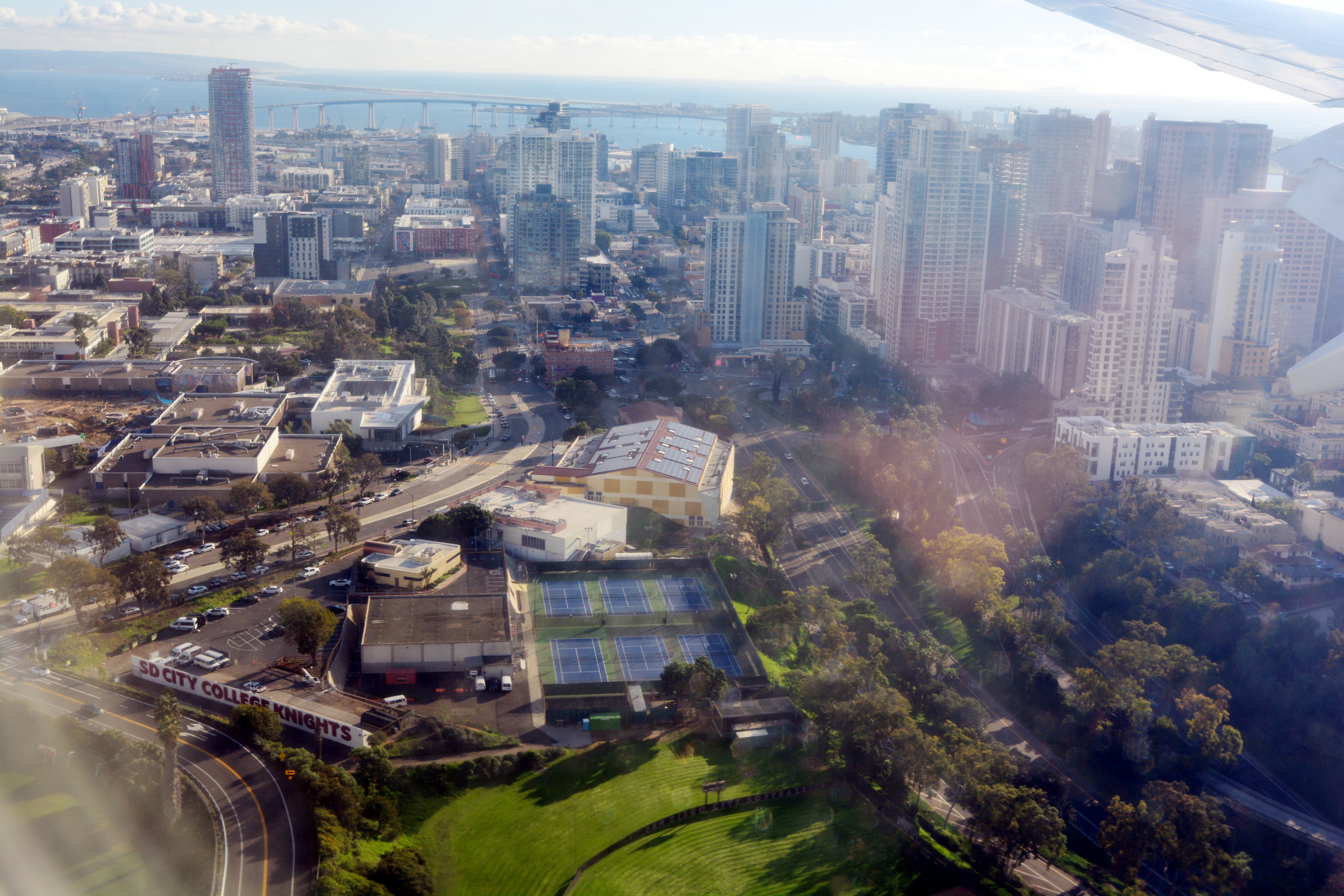
Aerial view of Downtown San Diego, CA looking south along Park Boulevard

=== Modernization period (since 2021) ===
In late 2021, the San Diego Unified School District unveiled its plans to modernize the SDHS campus. Among other improvements, this included demolishing and replacing the 100 buildings constructed in 1976, and improved HVAC systems for the 400, 500, and 600 buildings. The ground-breaking ceremony occurred on May 2, 2022, and construction was expected to be completed by 2025.

== Academics ==
In May 2006, Newsweek magazine ranked 1,200 public high schools in the U.S. and named San Diego High School of International Studies as 22nd best, making it the highest-ranking school in San Diego County and the second highest in the state of California. In 2009, US News ranked over 21,000 high schools in the United States and named San Diego High School of International Studies as 44th best, with an International Baccalaureate (IB) exam pass rate of 98% and an API score of over 800.

=== California Partnership Academies ===
San Diego High is home to three academies established within the scope of the California Department of Education California Partnership Academies (CPA) program. The CPA model is a three-year program (grades ten-twelve) structured as a school-within-a-school. The first one, the Academy of Finance, was established in 2007 at the School of Business and Leadership. Two more, the San Diego Medical Technology Academy (MedTech) established in 2011 and the Green Engineering Academy (GeoTech) established 2012 at the School of Science and Technology, with the first classes graduating in 2014 and 2015 respectively. The curriculum at Medtech Academy is based on the Biomedical Sciences program by Project Lead The Way (PLTW).

== Athletics ==
=== Balboa Stadium ===
San Diego High's football stadium, Balboa Stadium, was built in 1914 for the 1915 Panama–California Exposition with a capacity of 19,000 at that time. U.S. Presidents Woodrow Wilson and Franklin Delano Roosevelt gave speeches there. From 1961 to 1966 it was the home of the San Diego Chargers after being expanded to 34,000 capacity. Over the years it has played host to music legends such as Jimi Hendrix, and The Beatles in 1965. The 1914 stadium was torn down in the 1970s and a new one was dedicated in 1978 with a seating capacity of about 3,000. In 2009 the stadium saw new turf decorated with the school's mascot, the Caver. The stadium is used for various sports including football, soccer, and track, as well as San Diego High School graduation ceremonies.

=== Section, state, and national titles ===
- High School Football National Championship: 1916, 1955
- High school baseball national champions: 1921
- CIF football state champions: 2018
- CIF San Diego Section champions, boys' basketball: 1965, 1967, 1975 (D2A), 2008 (D1), 2017, 2018 (D4)
- CIF San Diego Section champions, girls' basketball: 2020

=== Athletic history ===
- The 1922 San Diego High baseball team was barred from league play by the CIF after its 1921 National Championship Squad played an unsanctioned game against the East's best baseball team of that time, Cleveland High. This game drew 11,000 fans and saw San Diego High defeat Cleveland 10–0. During the 1922 season, the team played college and independent teams, losing to just Stanford and the Sherman Indians. They beat Cleveland again in front of 13,000 fans.
- San Diego High participated in the first high school football game in San Diego County in 1898, defeating Escondido High School 6–0. Players and coaches from San Diego traveled in covered wagons over two days to reach their destination.
- Mia Labovitz in 1987 became the first female in the nation to score multiple points during a Varsity football game. In 1988, she kicked the game-winner (3–0) against St. Augustine High School, becoming the first female to score all of her team's points in a contest. She would finish her career with 4 FG and 8 PATs.
- Kate Sessions, considered the "mother of Balboa Park," taught at San Diego High in 1884.
- San Diego High claims that, in 1922, its cheerleading squad was the first high school or college to use female cheerleaders.

== Alumni and faculty ==
See also: Category:San Diego High School alumni
Name	Grad class	Category	Best known for
Hobbs Adams	Class of 1920	Athlete	College football all-American, coach
Joseph Cameron Alston	Class of 1944	Athlete	12-time NCAA badminton champion
Stan Barnes	Class of 1918	Athlete	College Football Hall of Fame member, US federal judge
Belle Benchley		Zoologist	Zoologist, author
Victor Bianchini	Class of 1956	Politician	U.S. federal judge; California state superior court judge; colonel, U.S. Marine Corps
Clara Breed		Librarian	Librarian and humanitarian
Earle Brucker, Jr.		Athlete	Former Major League Baseball player
Eileen Rose Busby		Author	Author
Charlie Cannon		Performer	Singer, theater performer, co-founder of Starlight Opera
Bob Cluck		Coach	Major League pitching coach, founder of The San Diego School of Baseball, author of ten books on baseball
Darren Comeaux		Athlete	Former National Football League player
Frank Comstock		Composer	Composer
Tom Dahms		Athlete	Former National Football League player and coach
Marc Davis		Athlete	Olympic runner
Kevin de León		Politician	Politician, U.S. Senate candidate
Jose De Vega		Actor	Actor, dancer, and choreographer in West Side Story
Robert Werner Duemling		Diplomat	United States Ambassador
Diamanda Galás		Musician	Avant-garde musician
Earl Ben Gilliam		Judge	United States federal judge
Dave Grayson		Athlete	Former National Football League player; transferred to Lincoln High School after his sophomore season
Neale Henderson		Athlete	Negro Baseball League player
Juan Felipe Herrera		Poet	51st United States Poet Laureate
Tom Hom		Politician	Politician, civic leader, businessman
Charde Houston	Class of 2004	Athlete	Women's National Basketball League player
Deron Johnson		Athlete	Former Major League Baseball player
Jacque Jones		Athlete	Major League Baseball player
Napoleon A. Jones Jr.		Judge	United States district judge
Meb Keflezighi		Athlete	Olympic silver medalist, winner of the 2009 New York and 2014 Boston marathons
Jeanne Lenhart		Athlete	Senior Olympian, amateur volleyball player, senior pageant winner
Joe Leonard		Athlete	Automobile and motorcycle champion
Art Linkletter		TV host	Television host
Harold Lloyd		Actor	Actor
Anita Loos		Writer	Screenwriter, playwright, and author
Dale Maple		Soldier	World War II soldier convicted of helping two German prisoners of war escape
Wayne McAllister		Architect	Architect
Bill Miller		Athlete	Olympic gold medalist, former world record holder in the pole vault
James R. Mills		Politician	California assemblyman and senator, mass transit advocate, historian
Richard Morefield		Diplomat	Diplomat
Harold Muller		Athlete	"Brick," Olympic silver medalist and College Football Hall of Fame member
Stephen Neal		Athlete	National Football League player, 1998/1999 NCAA wrestling champion, 2000 wrestling world champion
Graig Nettles		Athlete	Former Major League Baseball player
Craig Noel		Producer	Theatrical producer
Fabian Núñez		Politician	66th California Speaker of the Assembly
Pablo O'Higgins		Artist	American-Mexican artist, muralist, and illustrator
Gregory Peck	Class of 1934	Actor	Actor and Academy Award winner
Clarence Pinkston		Athlete	Olympic gold medalist
Art Powell		Athlete	Former National Football League player
Charlie Powell		Athlete	Former National Football League player, boxer
Clarence Nibs Price		Coach	College football head coach
Sol Price		Entrepreneur	Entrepreneur
Constance Reid		Mathematician	Mathematician, author
Lilian Jeannette Rice		Architect	Architect
Johnny Ritchey		Athlete	Former Negro League and PCL Baseball player
Floyd Robinson		Athlete	Former Major League Baseball player
Julia Robinson		Mathematician	Mathematician
Seraphim (Eugene) Rose	Class of 1952	Priest	Priest, author
Paul Runge		Umpire	Major League Baseball umpire
Russ Saunders	Class of 1924	Athlete	College Football all-American, Warner Brothers executive
Thomas Schelling		Economist	Nobel Prize–winning economist
Amby Schindler		Athlete	College Football all-American, Rose Bowl and College All-Star MVP
Kate Sessions		Horticulturist	Horticulturalist, botanist
Paul Smith	Class of 1940	Musician	Pianist
Brent Strom		Athlete	Former Major League Baseball player and coach
Steffan Tubbs	Class of 1987	Journalist	Journalist, radio host, reporter for ABC
Claire Van Vliet		Artist	Artist
Dan Walker		Politician	36th governor of Illinois
Cotton Warburton		Editor	Film editor, actor, and College Football Hall of Fame member
Willie West		Athlete	Former National Football League player
Art Williams		Athlete	Former National Basketball Association player
