= 1921 Idaho Vandals football team =

American college football season

1921 Idaho Vandals football
- Conference: Northwest Conference
- Record: 4–3–1 (1–2–1 Northwest)
- Head coach: Thomas Kelley (2nd season)
- Home stadium: MacLean Field

1921 Northwest Conference football standings
	Conf.					Overall
Team	W		L		T	W		L		T
Whitman $	3	–	0	–	0	4	–	2	–	0
Washington State	2	–	0	–	1	4	–	2	–	1
Oregon	1	–	0	–	3	5	–	1	–	3
Oregon Agricultural	1	–	1	–	1	4	–	3	–	2
Idaho	1	–	2	–	1	4	–	3	–	1
Montana	0	–	2	–	0	3	–	3	–	1
Willamette	0	–	3	–	0	1	–	5	–	0
$ – Conference champion

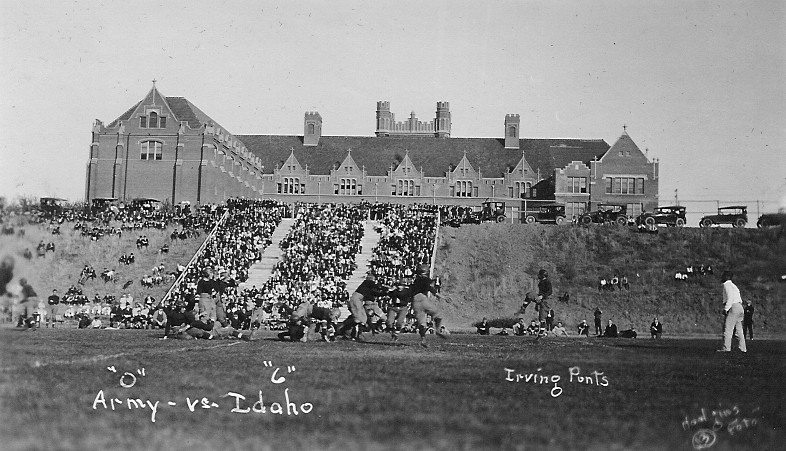
Idaho vs. Camp Lewis soldiers at MacLean Field on October 8, 1921

The 1921 Idaho Vandals football team represented the University of Idaho as a member of the Northwest Conference during the 1921 college football season. Led by Thomas Kelley in his second and final season as head coach, the Vandals compiled an overall record of 4–3–1 with a mark of 1–2–1 in conference play, placing fifth in the Northwest Conference. The Vandals had two home games in Moscow, one on campus at MacLean Field and another at the fairgrounds; they also played one in Boise at Public School Field.

Idaho dropped a seventh consecutive game to Washington State in the Battle of the Palouse, falling 3–20 at Rogers Field in Pullman. Two years later, the Vandals won the first of three consecutive, their only three-peat in the rivalry series. The Boise game against Wyoming on the third anniversary of Armistice Day was attended by Governor D. W. Davis.

The following June, Kelley left for the University of Missouri and was succeeded at Idaho by Robert L. Mathews.

== Schedule ==
Date	Opponent	Site	Result	Attendance	Source
October 8	Camp Lewis (Army)*	MacLean Field; Moscow, ID	W 6–0		
October 15	vs. Oregon	Multnomah Field; Portland, OR	T 7–7		
October 21	at Washington State	Rogers Field; Pullman, WA (Battle of the Palouse)	L 3–20	5,000	
October 29	at Utah*	Cummings Field; Salt Lake City, UT	L 7–17		
November 5	Montana	Fairgrounds field; Moscow, ID (rivalry)	W 35–7		
November 11	vs. Wyoming*	Public School Field; Boise, ID	W 31–3	7,000–8,000	
November 19	at Gonzaga*	Spokane fairgrounds; Spokane, WA	W 6–0	1,500	
November 24	at Whitman	Ankeny Field; Walla Walla, WA	L 3–14		
*Non-conference game
