= Victor Bianchini =

American judge (born 1938)

Victor Eugene Bianchini

Personal details
- Born: Victor Eugene Bianchini; 1938 (age 87–88) San Pedro, California, U.S.
- Party: Democratic
- Education: A.B. Political Science San Diego State College 1960; J.D. University of San Diego School of Law 1963.
- Occupation: Mediator, Arbitrator/Retired State Court and Federal Court Judge

Military service
- Branch/service: U.S. Marine Corps
- Years of service: 1959-1991
- Rank: Colonel
- Unit: 4th Tank Bn; 4th Force Recon; 1st MAW; USEUCOM
- Commands: MTU 12-1 (Law); 4th Force Reconnaissance Co., OIC, Judge Unit, Sierra Circuit; Deputy Inspector General, US European Command.
- Battles/wars: Starlight 8-1965; Tet 12-1965; Operation Utah 3-1966
- Awards: Legion of Merit, Bronze Star w/Combat "V", 3 Air Medals, Joint Services Commendation Medal, Combat Action Ribbon

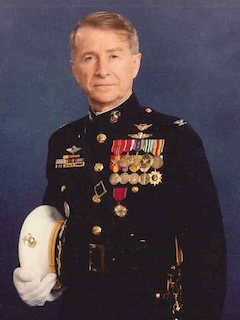
Colonel Victor Bianchini 1993

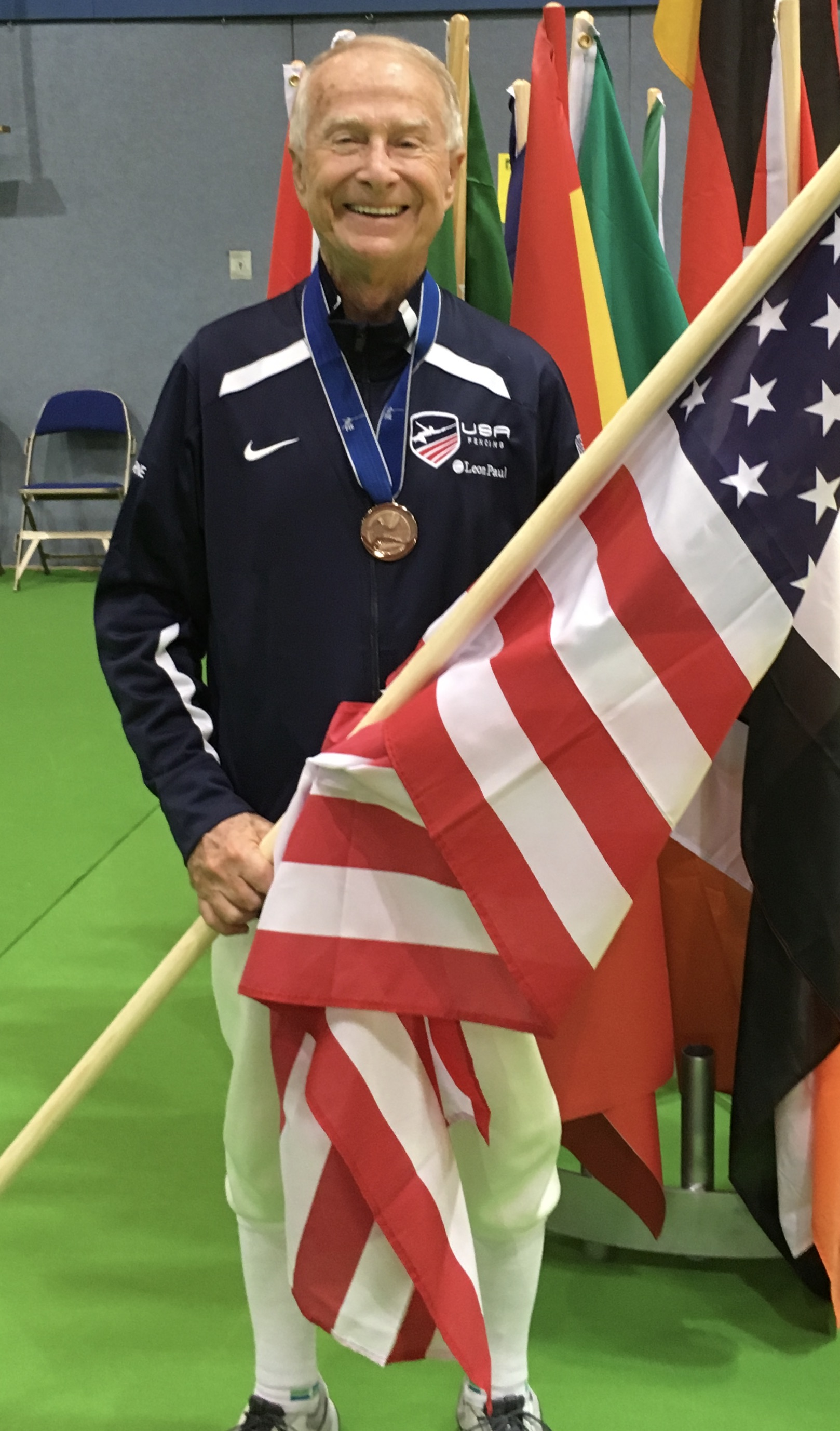
World Championships Team Bronze 2016, Stralsund, Germany

Victor Eugene Bianchini (born 1938) is a retired State of California Superior Court Judge, a retired, U.S. Magistrate Judge, and a retired Colonel, United States Marine Corps. He is currently a full-time arbitrator and mediator.

== Early life and education ==
He was born in San Pedro, California in 1938. His oldest brother, Henry Bianchini, is an artist based in Hawaii. His great-grandfather Shmuel Ben Kiki and grandfather Hayyim Ben Kiki were the chief Rabbis and Rabbinical Judges of Tiberias, Palestine, now Israel. The Ben Kiki family immigrated to Palestine from Rabat, Morocco in the 1800s. Bianchini is a first generation American. Bianchini's mother was a native of Tiberias, Palestine, and legally blind her entire life. His father, a native of Naples, Italy, was a career officer of the United States Navy. Relocating extensively because of his father's Naval service, he spent his early years in San Pedro, California, his WWII years in Saint Thomas, U.S. Virgin Islands, and Paterson, New Jersey, and his post-WWII years in Argentia, Newfoundland, Quonset Point, Rhode Island and finally settling, at the age of 13, in San Diego, California. He attended and graduated from San Diego High School (SDHS) and was inducted by the SDHS Alumni Association to its "Wall of Honor in 2005." He received a Bachelor of Arts degree in political science from the San Diego State University College of Arts & Letters in 1960, where he had extensive involvement in student government and was named to Who's Who in American Colleges and Universities. He received a Juris Doctor degree from the University of San Diego School of Law in 1963 and a Certificate in Judicial Development with an emphasis in Alternative Dispute Resolution from the National Judicial College, Reno, Nevada in 1995.

== Judicial service ==
After graduating from law school, Judge Bianchini served as the confidential law clerk to Chief U.S. District Court Judge James Marshall Carter of the Southern District of California from 1963 to 1964. Judge Carter was the supervising judge of the Southern Division of the Southern District of California, and during that time, became the founding Chief Judge of the newly designated Southern District of California, while the Los Angeles version of the Southern District then became the newly designated Central District in 1966. Judge Carter was elevated to the United States Court of Appeals for the Ninth Circuit in 1967.

Since then, Bianchini served as a judge, both state and federal, continuously for 48 years. He served as a U.S. Commissioner from 1968 to 1969, a U.S. Magistrate from 1974 to 1982, a San Diego County Municipal Court judge from 1982 to 1998 and was a California State Superior Court judge in San Diego County from 1998 to 2002. After retiring from the Superior Court in 2002, Bianchini was recalled to duty in 2002 with the Federal Courts as a United States magistrate judge and continually served until December 28, 2021. He was first recalled to the Western District of New York (Buffalo and Rochester), then served simultaneously in both the Western and Northern Districts of New York until 2013. He then transferred and served with the Eastern District of Washington (Spokane, Yakima) for two years, and served in the United States District Court for the Central District of California (Los Angeles, Santa Ana & Riverside) for seven years from 2015 to the end of 2021. During these assignments, he volunteered frequently in his home district of the Southern District of California (San Diego) from 2006 to 2017.

In addition to his extensive part-time duties on the federal bench, where he settled complex civil cases, prisoner civil rights cases, decided writs of habeas corpus and Social Security disability appeals cases until the end of 2021, Bianchini continues to practice as a private neutral mediator and arbitrator for Signature Resolution, and prior to that he served a similar role for almost over 17 years for a different mediation and arbitration service (2002–2007, 2012–2024). He also extensively practices as an arbitrator for the American Arbitration Association.

During his federal recall assignments following his state court retirement, Bianchini authored over 2,000 federal court opinions, primarily on writs of habeas corpus and Social Security Disability Appeal decisions, both in the 2nd and 9th Federal Circuits, most of which are published either in the Federal Supplement or on the legal research sites of Westlaw and Lexis.

== Notable cases ==
In People v. Sherrod, 59 Cal.App.4th 1168 (4th District Court of Appeals, California, Division 1, 1997), appeal from the San Diego Superior Court grant of new trial. New trial granted on the basis that a denial of continuance in an attempt murder trial prejudiced the Defendant, because of inability to prepare. Affirmed by the 4th District Court of Appeals California, Division 1.

In Brinson v. Walker, 407 F. Supp. 2d 456 (W.D.N.Y. 2006); Brinson v. Walker 457 F.3d 387 (2d Cir. 2008), Habeas granted on basis that the trial judge's ruling erroneously deprived the applicant of his right to cross-examine the prosecution's complaining witness to demonstrate the witness's racial prejudice and his motive to testify untruthfully. Affirmed by the 2d Circuit Court of Appeals.

In D’Alessandro v. Mukasey, 628 F.Supp.2d 368 (W.D.N.Y. 2009), Granted Habeas relief to a petitioner in poor physical health after being detained for 15 months by ICE; ordered ICE to immediately release petitioner on bond. Affirmed by the 2d Circuit Court of Appeals. See also, bail request.

Robles v. Dennison, 745 F.Supp.2d 244 (W.D.N.Y.); Reluctant Denial of Habeas relief based on New York liberty interest considerations.

Jackson v. Conway, 765 F.Supp.2d 192 (W.D.N.Y.2011); Habeas granted based on ineffective assistance of counsel; Affirmed in part by 2d Circuit: Jackson v. Conway, 763 F.3d 115 (2d Cir. 2014);.

Dearstyne v. Mazzuca, 48 F.Supp. 3d, 222 (N.D.N.Y. 2011); Habeas recommended based on involuntary confession, ineffective assistance of Counsel. Dearstyne v. Mazzuca, 2015 and ultimately affirmed in part by 2d Circuit on involuntary confession grounds. U.S. Dist. LEXIS 110587; Order 2d Circuit.

== Legal profession awards and honors ==
Bianchini was inducted by the San Diego High School (SDHS) Alumni Association to its "Wall of Honor in 2005. He was honored with two awards by the San Diego Trial Lawyers (Consumer Attorneys of San Diego) in 1991, including "Trial Judge of the Year", and the "President's Award for as "Soldier, Statesman, Jurist,". He also received the Foothills Bar Association Legal Professional of the Year award in 2001, received Family Law Judge of the Year Honors from the El Cajon Superior Court. He was named the Poway School District "Volunteer of the Year" in 2007 for service as the debate and moot court coach for Mt. Carmel High School. He was recognized by the 9th Circuit Pro Se Committee for "Excellence In Pro Se Case Management Strategies" in 2016 for his prisoner civil rights settlement work. He has been named a “Legend of the Bar” by the San Diego County Bar Association's “oral history project", was recognized as a Distinguished Alumni of San Diego State University in 2018 and was awarded the prestigious Bernard E. Witkin Award, by the San Diego County Law Library in 2019 for “Excellence in Adjudication of the Law.

== Community service ==
Bianchini has served on numerous boards, councils and organizations. He was chairman of the University of San Diego School of Law Board of Visitors from 1978 to 1979. He also volunteered for service as an AAU boxing referee for the Community Youth Athletic Association (previously, the Chicano Athletic Association) from 1978 to 1980, and discontinued when the head coach and executive director, Junior Robles, was killed in a tragic airplane crash in Poland carrying the U.S. Boxing Team. He was President of the San Diego County Law Library board of trustees, and President of the San Diego County Law Library Justice Foundation in the 1990s. He presently holds a voluntary position with the San Diego Law Library Foundation (director and past president) on which he continues to serve as a director. Most recently, he was a director and vice president of the San Diego County Bar Association (2019-2021)and also served as a director on the San Diego County Bar Association Board of Directors from 1978 to 1980 as director, treasurer, and vice president. He has served on the Board of Governors and the Judicial Advisory Committee of the Association of Business Trial Lawyers San Diego (ABTL) as community outreach co-chair of the Trial Attorney Program (TAP), and serves on the Veterans Advisory Councils of both San Diego State University, and the University of San Diego School of Law. Immediately following his release from Marine Corps active service in 1967, he toured Europe on a motorcycle and then served as a volunteer at Kibbutz Ein Gev, Tiberias, Israel for approximately six months prior to entering into private law practice in the U.S.

Bianchini is the immediate past chairman of the Flying Leatherneck Aviation Museum's Historical Foundation, leaving his position on September 15, 2022. He was succeeded by Lieutenant General Terry G. Robling, USMC, Retired. He was recently inducted to the Flying Leathernecks Foundation Wall of Honor. He served as the president of the Marine Corps Recruit Depot Historical Foundation from 2007 to 2009; is the past vice chair of the Veterans Village of San Diego (VVSD), as well as life member and former director on the Marine Corps Reserve Association governing board, from which he resigned in 2021. He is a life member of the Force Reconnaissance Association, a life member of the United States Marine Corps Combat Correspondents Association, life member of the Disabled American Veterans, a member of the U.S.M.C. Combat Helicopter and Tiltrotor Association(“Pop-a-Smoke”), and a life member of the Jewish War Veterans.

Bianchini was a director on board of Kraemer Endowment Foundation supporting the St. Madeliene Sophie's Sanctuary for Disabled Adults, has been an advisor to the Huntington Disease Youth Organization (HDYO) and is on the advisory board of the Jerusalem Foundation, which supports the Israeli Tisch Biblical Jerusalem Zoo and youth outreach, San Diego Chapter. He was the 2020 - 2021 President of the San Diego Kiwanis Foundation; and his service was recognized with the "Don McKee Spirit of Service" Award for 2020-2021.

== Academic ==
Bianchini has held numerous professorships. He served as an associate professor in business law at San Diego State University (SDSU) from 1969 to 1973, the foreign student advisor (now named International Student Advisor) and the legal advisor to the Associated Student Body. During campus disturbances at SDSU in the 1970 timeframe, he was the legal advisor to the acting president. He also served as the Chairman of the University of San Diego School of Law (USD) Board of Visitors for the years 1978 and 1979. He later became an adjunct professor and administrator, chair of the Criminal Justice and Business Law departments of National University, the founding dean of the National University's law school from (June 1978 – 1981), and professor of business law (1978–1998). He taught Thomas Jefferson School of Law, specializing in the field of evidence, for almost 12 years. Bianchini also taught evidence law at the National Judicial College, which, during that time was a member of its faculty council and earned a Certificate in Judicial Development with an emphasis on alternative dispute resolution in 1995. In connection with a Rule of Law teaching team from the National Judicial College, Bianchini lectured in Kazakhstan and Kyrgyzstan by way of Moscow in the 1996.

In the 1980s, he gave a series of evidence lectures at the San Diego Trial Lawyers' (now Consumer Attorneys of San Diego) lecture series and was honored extensively for that effort. In addition, he held positions on the faculty of the California Continuing Judicial Studies Program (CJER) (1987–1998).

Immediately prior to his retirement from the superior court in 2002, he was selected by the U.S. State Department to serve, during a leave of absence from his Superior Court duties, as a Senior Fulbright Scholar as part of the Fulbright Program to the Sub-Saharan African country of Eritrea, where he served as consultant to the Minister of Justice, and with his expertise in ethics, wrote the judiciary's Code of Conduct, crafted a 2,000-page judicial education syllabus for the country's National Judiciary, and taught South African Law to a select group of Eritrean judges.

== Personal life ==
Victor Bianchini has a wife of 40 years, and three daughters (two from a former marriage). He is a former owner of a Beechcraft Bonanza, and holds commercial, multi-engine, instrument, and helicopter licenses, and is a rated captain in the Cessna Citation C500.

== Fencing ==
Bianchini began saber fencing in early 2010, at the age of 72 when, having never fenced before, while watching his youngest daughter fence epee, her coach approached him and suggested that he try sabre fencing. He began with almost immediate success. His totals for all National competitions, domestic and International, including Worlds, are Golds: 25, Silver: 15, Bronze: 27.

He has qualified for 11 World Championships, 9 of which have been for the U.S. and two have been for Portugal. His World Championships record includes two team Gold medals, a team Silver medal, and team Bronze Medal. In 2011, one year after beginning fencing, he placed 6th in individual competition at the Veterans World Championships in, Porec, Croatia, placed 7th in Varna, Bulgaria and 10th twice in successive World Championships. The oldest age group in World Championships is 70 years of age. There is no 80s Division. He qualified for his 8th World Championship in Cairo, Egypt in 2019 at the official age of 82, and his 9th World championship Team for the U.S. at the official age of 84 in 2021, but the competition was canceled because of COVID. He then attended his 10th World Championships (Daytona Beach, FL) in 2023 at the official age of 86, and his 11th World Championships (Dubai, United Arab Emirates) in 2024, at the official age of 87, both for the Country of Portugal. He will attend his 12th World during the 2025 World Championships (Manama, Bahrain) for Portugal at the official age of 88 years of age in his almost 16 years of fencing, (2010-2025). He began Fencing for Portugal in 2023, at the age of 84, made possible by his citizenship of that country under Portugal's program of right of return. Because he loved international competition, and because it became evident that he was no longer competitive for qualification in the U.S. for Worlds competition in 70’s category based on the influx of much younger well qualified fencers U.S. fencers, he chose to fence for Portugal at the age of 84, because of his love of international competition. His switch to Portugal enabled him to compete at the World Championship level, where he finished 14th in Daytona Beach as the second oldest competitor in the competition, and 26th in Dubai as the oldest competitor in the competition. The FIE averaged the two competitions and now places him statistically 20th in the World in the 70’s at the age of official age of 87 years, making him the highest, oldest ranked fencer in the World for Sabre.

He also has competed in two Maccabiah Games in the 40-year old Division in 2013 at the age of 75 winning Bronze, and in 2021 in at the age of 83 in the 35-year old Division again winning Bronze, all in Sabre, and won Silver in Team Epee. Bianchini fenced Epee for a short time and won a Silver and several Bronze medals as well.

These statistics do not include results from local competitions, where he won approximately 60 additional awards competing almost exclusively against youth, as there were no veteran’s categories in local and regional competitions for many years.

== Military service ==
Bianchini served for 31 years in the United States Marine Corps, active and reserve, retiring as a colonel. He has remained active in military support groups and veteran affairs.

Bianchini first enlisted in the United States Marine Corps in 1959 and entered commissioned service in September 1960. He served as a tank platoon commander with the 4th Tank Battalion from 1960 to 1961. He then served as a force reconnaissance platoon commander with the 4th Force Reconnaissance Company from 1962 to 1964. He attended and successfully completed the United States Army Airborne School in 1963. Upon completion of his federal judiciary clerkship, he was called to active duty in 1964. His active duty included a 13-month tour in the Republic of Vietnam including as a special staff officer to the commanding general, officer in charge (OIC) of the 1st Marine Aircraft Wing Photo Labs, the Wing civil affairs officer, combat correspondent, and combat air crewman, during which time he parachuted with the Army of Republic of Vietnam Forces (ARVN). For a brief time in Vietnam, he was trial and defense counsel for courts-martial. He was also a trial and defense counsel at Marine Corps Air Station Iwakuni, Japan, Marine Corps Air Station Cherry Point, North Carolina, and Marine Corps Recruit Depot San Diego.

Bianchini left active service in 1967 and remained in the Reserves. In 1968, he rejoined the 4th Force Reconnaissance Company in 1968 and served as the unit's operations officer, the executive officer, commanding officer and the unit's jumpmaster. From 1971 to 1981, he served in numerous summertime assignments at Headquarters Marine Corps, the board for Correction of Naval Records, acting Staff Judge Advocate (SJA) at MCRD San Diego and Marine Corps Forces, Pacific (Camp Smith). From 1976 until 1983, he served as the commanding officer of the Mobilization Training Unit (MTU Law) 12–1 in San Diego. In 1984 he then became the officer in charge (OIC) and senior military judge of the Reserve Military Judges Unit, Sierra Circuit, Camp Pendleton. In 1988, he served as a special staff officer, Marine Corps Reserve Support Command (MCRSC) in Overland Park, Kansas. In 1988 through 1991, he served as the deputy inspector general, United States European Command (USEUCOM) in Vaihingen, Germany. During that tour, he was recalled to active duty during Desert Shield/Desert Storm and served as an Inspector General Investigator at Headquarters, Marine Corps, while still retaining his status as the deputy inspector general of USEUCOM. Bianchini retired from his recall to active service and from EUCOM as a colonel in July 1991.

Bianchini's formal military education includes the United States Marne Corps Tank and Amphibious Tractor Course at Camp Pendleton, California, 1961, the United States Army Airborne School at Fort Benning, Georgia, 1963, his 4th Force Reconnaissance Unit's jump-master course 1964, the Marine Corps Officer's Basic School 1964-1965, Naval Justice School, (West Coast Session, Camp Pendleton) 1965, the MACV Civil Affairs Advisors Officer Orientation Course, Saigon, Vietnam 1965, Command & Staff College, Phase I, Quantico, Virginia 1974, Army Military Judges Course at the University of Virginia and was certified as a military trial judge for military courts-martial 1984, and the NATO Senior Officers' Orientation Course, Oberamagau, Germany 1988.

In 2003, Bianchini was appointed by the Secretary of the Navy to serve on limited active duty on the Secretary of the Navy's Navy & Marine Corps Retiree Council, serving for three years from 2003 to 2005.

== Military awards ==
Bianchini received the following military awards and decorations:

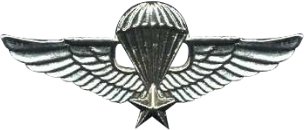

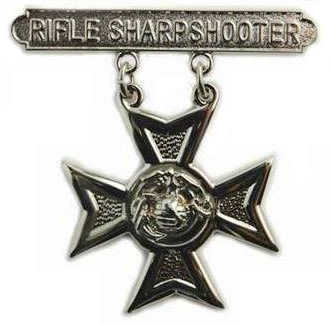

U.S. Marine Corps Combat Aircrew Badge
Navy and Marine Corps Parachutist Insignia
Republic of South Vietnam Jump Wings
1st Row	Legion of Merit			
2nd Row	Bronze Star Medal w/ Combat "V"	Air Medal w/ two 5/16" Gold Stars	Joint Service Commendation Medal	Combat Action Ribbon
3rd Row	Presidential Unit Citation	Joint Meritorious Unit Award	Navy Unit Commendation	Navy Meritorious Unit Commendation
4th Row	Selected Marine Corps Reserve Medal	National Defense Service Medal w/one 3/16" Bronze Star	Vietnam Service Medal w/ two 3/16" Bronze Stars	Navy and Marine Corps Overseas Service Ribbon w/ one 3/16" Bronze Star
5th Row	Armed Forces Reserve Medal w/"M" device & Silver Hourglass	Republic of Vietnam Meritorious Unit Citation (Gallantry Cross) w/ Palm and Frame	Republic of Vietnam Meritorious Unit Citation (Civil Actions) w/ Palm and Frame	Republic of Vietnam Campaign Medal w/ 1960- Device

- Marine Corps Rifle Sharpshooter Badge
- Marine Corps Pistol Expert Badge with requalification clasp to signify 2nd Award
