= Neale Henderson =

American baseball player (1930–2018)

- Shortstop
- Born: June 24, 1930; Fort Smith, Arkansas
- Died: December 24, 2018 (aged 88); San Diego, California
- Batted: Right Threw: Right

Teams
- Kansas City Monarchs (1950–1951)

Neale Henderson (June 24, 1930 – December 27, 2018), nicknamed "Bobo", was an American baseball shortstop. Henderson batted and threw right handed.

Born in Fort Smith, Arkansas, Henderson moved with his family to San Diego, California in 1941. In there, he honed his skills at San Diego High School, where he excelled in baseball, football and track and field, winning three titles as an infielder for the Coast League Baseball champion team and two titles as the starting quarterback of the Coast League Football squad, becoming the first African-American quarterback to earn that accomplishment.

His introduction to the Negro leagues came early on in 1937, when he was seven years old, and was used as a batboy for the Kansas City Monarchs in an exhibition game against the Homestead Grays in Fort Smith.

After graduating in 1949, Henderson signed with the Abilene Ikes, a farm team for the Monarchs. He was promoted to the big team in 1950, where he moved to outfield to make room for a shortstop prospect named Ernie Banks. Henderson was a competent outfielder for the Monarchs during two seasons. In addition, he played from 1951 through 1953 for the Kansas City Travelers, an independent club managed by Cool Papa Bell.

Henderson ended his baseball career when he was drafted into the U.S. Army during the Korean War. At this time, he played for baseball and football teams at Camp Roberts in California and Fort Lewis in Washington. Following his discharge, he worked for 39 years at General Dynamics as a supervisor.

In 2008, Major League Baseball staged a special draft of the surviving Negro league players, doing a tribute for the surviving Negro leaguers who were kept out of the Big Leagues because of their race. Hall of Fame Baseball player Dave Winfield hatched the idea to have this draft, and MLB Commissioner Bud Selig and executive vice president Jimmie Lee Solomon also spearheaded the event, which was held before the 2008 MLB draft. MLB clubs each selected a former NLB player, and Henderson was drafted as a shortstop by the Baltimore Orioles.

In 2014, Henderson was honored at Petco Park on African American Heritage Night. After the ceremony, he explained in a TV interview about playing in the Negro leagues.

Henderson died in 2018 in San Diego, California, at the age of 88.
