= 1921 Oregon Webfoots football team =

American college football season

1921 Oregon Webfoots football
- Conference: Northwest Conference, Pacific Coast Conference
- Record: 5–1–3 (1–0–3 Northwest, 0–1–2 PCC)
- Head coach: Charles A. Huntington (4th season)
- Captain: Martin Howard
- Home stadium: Hayward Field

1921 Northwest Conference football standings
| | Conf. | | | | | Overall |
| Team | W | | L | | T | W | | L | | T |
|---|---|---|---|---|---|---|---|---|---|---|
| Whitman $ | 3 | – | 0 | – | 0 | 4 | – | 2 | – | 0 |
| Washington State | 2 | – | 0 | – | 1 | 4 | – | 2 | – | 1 |
| Oregon | 1 | – | 0 | – | 3 | 5 | – | 1 | – | 3 |
| Oregon Agricultural | 1 | – | 1 | – | 1 | 4 | – | 3 | – | 2 |
| Idaho | 1 | – | 2 | – | 1 | 4 | – | 3 | – | 1 |
| Montana | 0 | – | 2 | – | 0 | 3 | – | 3 | – | 1 |
| Willamette | 0 | – | 3 | – | 0 | 1 | – | 5 | – | 0 |
$ – Conference champion

1921 Pacific Coast Conference football standings
| | Conf. | | | | | Overall |
| Team | W | | L | | T | W | | L | | T |
|---|---|---|---|---|---|---|---|---|---|---|
| California $ | 4 | – | 0 | – | 0 | 9 | – | 0 | – | 1 |
| Washington State | 2 | – | 1 | – | 1 | 4 | – | 2 | – | 1 |
| Stanford | 1 | – | 1 | – | 1 | 4 | – | 2 | – | 2 |
| Oregon Agricultural | 1 | – | 2 | – | 1 | 4 | – | 3 | – | 2 |
| Oregon | 0 | – | 1 | – | 2 | 5 | – | 1 | – | 3 |
| Washington | 0 | – | 3 | – | 1 | 3 | – | 4 | – | 1 |
$ – Conference champion

The 1921 Oregon Webfoots football team represented the University of Oregon as a member of the Northwest Conference and the Pacific Coast Conference (PCC) during the 1921 college football season. In their fourth season under head coach Charles A. Huntington, the Webfoots compiled an overall record of 5–1–3 and outscored their opponents 145 to 75. Oregon had a record of 1–0–3 in Northwest Conference play, placing third, and 0–1–2 against PCC opponents, finishing fifth. The team played home games on campus, at Hayward Field in Eugene, Oregon.

== Schedule ==
| Date | Opponent | Site | Result | Attendance | Source |
|---|---|---|---|---|---|
| October 1 | at Willamette | Sweetland Field; Salem, OR | W 7–3 | | |
| October 8 | Pacific (OR)* | Hayward Field; Eugene, OR | W 21–7 | | |
| October 15 | vs. Idaho | Multnomah Field; Portland, OR | T 7–7 | | |
| October 22 | at California | California Field; Berkeley, CA | L 0–39 | | |
| November 5 | at Washington State | Rogers Field; Pullman, WA | T 7–7 | 6,000 | |
| November 19 | Oregon Agricultural | Hayward Field; Eugene, OR (rivalry) | T 0–0 | 8,000 | |
| November 24 | at Multnomah Athletic Club* | Multnomah Field; Portland, OR | W 21–7 | | |
| December 26 | at Hawaii* | Moiliili Field; Honolulu, Territory of Hawaii | W 47–0 | | |
| January 2, 1922 | at Pearl Harbor* | Moiliili Field; Honolulu, Territory of Hawaii | W 35–0 | 10,000 | |
*Non-conference game
