= 1921 Washington State Cougars football team =

American college football season

1921 Washington State Cougars football
- Conference: Northwest Conference, Pacific Coast Conference
- Record: 4–2–1 (2–0–1 Northwest, 2–1–1 PCC)
- Head coach: Gus Welch (3rd season)
- Captain: Earl Dunlap
- Home stadium: Rogers Field

1921 Northwest Conference football standings
	Conf.					Overall
Team	W		L		T	W		L		T
Whitman $	3	–	0	–	0	4	–	2	–	0
Washington State	2	–	0	–	1	4	–	2	–	1
Oregon	1	–	0	–	3	5	–	1	–	3
Oregon Agricultural	1	–	1	–	1	4	–	3	–	2
Idaho	1	–	2	–	1	4	–	3	–	1
Montana	0	–	2	–	0	3	–	3	–	1
Willamette	0	–	3	–	0	1	–	5	–	0
$ – Conference champion

1921 Pacific Coast Conference football standings
	Conf.					Overall
Team	W		L		T	W		L		T
California $	4	–	0	–	0	9	–	0	–	1
Washington State	2	–	1	–	1	4	–	2	–	1
Stanford	1	–	1	–	1	4	–	2	–	2
Oregon Agricultural	1	–	2	–	1	4	–	3	–	2
Oregon	0	–	1	–	2	5	–	1	–	3
Washington	0	–	3	–	1	3	–	4	–	1
$ – Conference champion

The 1921 Washington State Cougars football team represented Washington State College—now known as Washington State University—as a member of the Northwest Conference and the Pacific Coast Conference (PCC) during the 1921 college football season. Led by third-year head coach Gus Welch, the Cougars compiled an overall record of 4–2–1. Washington State had a record of 2–0–1 in Northwest Conference play and 2–1–1 against PCC opponents, placing second in both conferences.

== Schedule ==
Date	Opponent	Site	Result	Attendance	Source
October 15	at Gonzaga*	Spokane fairgrounds; Spokane, WA	W 54–7	4,000	
October 21	Idaho	Rogers Field; Pullman, WA (rivalry)	W 23–3	5,000	
October 29	vs. California	Multnomah Field; Portland, OR	L 0–14	11,000–12,000	
November 5	Oregon	Rogers Field; Pullman, WA	T 7–7	6,000	
November 11	at Oregon Agricultural	Bell Field; Corvallis, OR (Armistice Day)	W 7–3	10,000	
November 24	at Washington	Husky Stadium; Seattle, WA (rivalry)	W 14–0	15,000	
December 3	at USC*	Tournament Park; Pasadena, CA	L 7–28	18,000	
*Non-conference game
