= Crip Toomey =

American sportsperson (1895-1961)

Biographical details
- Born: November 10, 1895; Fresno, California, U.S.
- Died: June 28, 1961 (aged 65); Woodland, California, U.S.

Playing career

Football
- 1919–1921: California

Baseball
- c. 1920: California
- Positions: Halfback (football); Catcher (baseball)

Coaching career (HC unless noted)

Football
- 1928–1936: Cal Aggies

Basketball
- 1928–1936: Cal Aggies

Administrative career (AD unless noted)
- 1928–1961: Cal Aggies / UC Davis

Head coaching record
- Overall: 24–42–8 (football); 55–89 (basketball)

Accomplishments and honors

Championships
- Football; 2 national (1920–1921); 1 Far Western (1929)

Awards
- 2× First-team All-Pacific Coast (1920, 1921)

Irving Francis "Crip" Toomey (November 10, 1895 – June 28, 1961) was an American football and baseball player, coach of football and basketball, and college athletics administrator. He attended the University of California, Berkeley, where he played college football as a halfback on Andy Smith's California Golden Bears football teams from 1919 to 1921. Toomey served as the head football coach at the Northern Branch of the College of Agriculture—now known as the University of California, Davis (UC Davis)—from 1928 to 1936, compiling a record of 24–42–8. He was also the head basketball coach there from 1928 to 1936, tallying a mark of 55–89. Toomey served as the athletic director at UC Davis from 1928 until his death in 1961.

Toomey was born on November 10, 1895, in Fresno, California, and attended Fresno High School. He served as a lieutenant in the United States Army during World War I. He died on June 28, 1961, at the Woodland Clinic Memorial Hospital in Woodland, California.

== Head coaching record ==
=== Football ===
| Year | Team | Overall | Conference | Standing | Bowl/playoffs |
|---|---|---|---|---|---|
Cal Aggies (Far Western Conference) (1928–1936)
| 1928 | Cal Aggies | 6–3 | 3–1 | T–2nd | |
| 1929 | Cal Aggies | 6–2 | 5–0 | 1st | |
| 1930 | Cal Aggies | 0–7–1 | 0–3–1 | T–5th | |
| 1931 | Cal Aggies | 4–2–2 | 2–1–2 | T–1st | |
| 1932 | Cal Aggies | 1–8–1 | 1–4 | 5th | |
| 1933 | Cal Aggies | 2–5 | 1–4 | 6th | |
| 1934 | Cal Aggies | 0–5–3 | 0–2–2 | 5th | |
| 1935 | Cal Aggies | 2–6–1 | 1–3 | 5th | |
| 1936 | Cal Aggies | 3–4 | 1–2 | 4th | |
| Cal Aggies: | | 24–42–8 | 14–20–5 | | |
| Total: | | 24–42–8 | | | |
National championship Conference title Conference division title or championship game berth
