= Ray Eckmann =

American politician

Biographical details
- Born: February 9, 1900
- Died: February 14, 1978 (aged 79); Seattle, Washington, U.S.

Playing career
- 1919–1921: Washington
- Position: Halfback

Coaching career (HC unless noted)
- 1922–1928 or 1929: Washington (assistant)

Administrative career (AD unless noted)
- 1936–1942: Washington

Accomplishments and honors

Awards
- First-team All-PCC (1918); Second-team All-PCC (1920)

Ray L. Eckmann (February 9, 1900 – February 14, 1978) was an American college football player and coach, athletics administrator, businessman, and politician.

== Early years ==
Eckmann attended Lincoln High School in Seattle, Washington where he was a star quarterback. As of 2015, he still holds multiple single-game touchdown and scoring state records.

== College career ==
Eckmann played halfback at the University of Washington. He was a three-time letterman and a team captain for the 1921 team which he led in scoring. He also starred for the track team as a sprinter. His football exploits earned him a nomination for the national Helms Football Hall of Fame.

== Coaching and administration ==
After college, Eckmann returned to Washington as an assistant football coach from 1922 until 1928. Eckmann became both the Washington athletic director and director of student affairs in 1936. In 1941, he terminated the duties of football coach James Phelan who had compiled a 65–37–9 record from 1930 to 1941, replacing him with Ralph Welch.

Based on his collegiate athletic prowess, Eckmann was appointed in January 1942 to an advisory committee for the Navy Aeronautic V-5 Preflight Schools. He left Washington in 1942 and focused on his clothing business.

== Business ==
In 1918, Carroll Martin opened a men's haberdashery on the Ave in Seattle's University District. Eckmann partnered with Martin four years later on the renamed "Martin & Eckmann's" which remained in business for over 50 years.

== Civics and politics ==
Eckmann served as the 1950 Seafair prime minister. In 1964, Eckmann was appointed to the Seattle City Council by James d'Orma Braman, who left his councilman position to become mayor. Eckmann remained on the council until 1967, but was briefly reappointed in 1970 due to the death of Myrtle Edwards. His obituary in the Seattle Post-Intelligencer recognized his involvement with "the Shrine, the University Rotary Club, the University Commercial Club, Seafair, the American Automobile Association, the Seattle Yacht Club, and Seattle General Hospital." and "half a century as one of Seattle's most prominent citizens."

== Awards ==
In 1982, Eckmann was inducted into the Washington Huskies hall of fame.

== Family ==
Eckmann and wife Dorothy had two sons, Robert Ray Eckmann and James Eckmann. Robert also played football and basketball at Washington.
