= 1921 Montana Grizzlies football team =

American college football season

1921 Montana Grizzlies football
- Conference: Northwest Conference
- Record: 3–3–1 (0–2 Northwest)
- Head coach: Bernie Bierman (3rd season)
- Home stadium: Dornblaser Field

1921 Northwest Conference football standings
| | Conf. | | | | | Overall |
| Team | W | | L | | T | W | | L | | T |
|---|---|---|---|---|---|---|---|---|---|---|
| Whitman $ | 3 | – | 0 | – | 0 | 4 | – | 2 | – | 0 |
| Washington State | 2 | – | 0 | – | 1 | 4 | – | 2 | – | 1 |
| Oregon | 1 | – | 0 | – | 3 | 5 | – | 1 | – | 3 |
| Oregon Agricultural | 1 | – | 1 | – | 1 | 4 | – | 3 | – | 2 |
| Idaho | 1 | – | 2 | – | 1 | 4 | – | 3 | – | 1 |
| Montana | 0 | – | 2 | – | 0 | 3 | – | 3 | – | 1 |
| Willamette | 0 | – | 3 | – | 0 | 1 | – | 5 | – | 0 |
$ – Conference champion

The 1921 Montana Grizzlies football team represented the University of Montana as a member of the Northwest Conference during the 1922 college football season. Led by Bernie Bierman in this third and final season as head coach, the Grizzlies compiled an overall record of 3–3–1 with a mark of 0–2 in conference play, placing sixth in the Northwest Conference.

== Schedule ==
| Date | Time | Opponent | Site | Result | Attendance | Source |
|---|---|---|---|---|---|---|
| October 8 | | Idaho Technical* | Dornblaser Field; Missoula, MT | W 25–0 | 2,000 | |
| October 15 | | at Washington* | Husky Stadium; Seattle, WA | L 7–28 | 6,033 | |
| October 29 | 3:00 p.m. | Whitman | Dornblaser Field; Missoula, MT | L 6–14 | 2,300 | |
| November 5 | | at Idaho | Fairgrounds field; Moscow, ID (rivalry) | L 7–35 | | |
| November 11 | | at Montana State* | Bozeman, MT (rivalry) | W 14–7 | | |
| November 18 | | North Dakota Agricultural* | Dornblaser Field; Missoula, MT | W 7–6 | | |
| November 24 | | at Gonzaga* | Spokane, WA | T 0–0 | | |
*Non-conference game; All times are in Mountain time
