= 1921 Stanford football team =

American college football season

1921 Stanford football
- Conference: Pacific Coast Conference
- Record: 4–2–2 (1–1–1 PCC)
- Head coach: Eugene Van Gent (1st season)
- Home stadium: Stanford Field; Stanford Stadium

1921 Pacific Coast Conference football standings
	Conf.					Overall
Team	W		L		T	W		L		T
California $	4	–	0	–	0	9	–	0	–	1
Washington State	2	–	1	–	1	4	–	2	–	1
Stanford	1	–	1	–	1	4	–	2	–	2
Oregon Agricultural	1	–	2	–	1	4	–	3	–	2
Oregon	0	–	1	–	2	5	–	1	–	3
Washington	0	–	3	–	1	3	–	4	–	1
$ – Conference champion

The 1921 Stanford football team represented Stanford University in the 1921 college football season. They were coached by Eugene Van Gent in his only season as head coach. The team played most of its home games at the 15,000-seat Stanford Field while construction on the new 60,000-seat Stanford Stadium was being completed. Stanford Stadium officially opened for the final game, the Big Game against California, in which the Bears defeated Stanford 42–7.

== Schedule ==
Date	Opponent	Site	Result	Attendance	Source
October 1	Mare Island Marines*	Stanford Field; Stanford, CA	W 41–0		
October 8	Saint Mary's*	Stanford Field; Stanford, CA	W 10–7	> 5,000	
October 15	at Olympic Club*	Ewing Field; San Francisco, CA	W 7–0		
October 22	Pacific Fleet*	Stanford Field; Stanford, CA	L 7–27		
October 29	Oregon Agricultural	Stanford Field; Stanford, CA	W 14–7	10,000	
November 5	at Washington	Washington Stadium; Seattle, WA	T 0–0	12,653	
November 12	Nevada*	Stanford Field; Stanford, CA	T 14–14		
November 19	California	Stanford Stadium; Stanford, CA (Big Game)	L 7–42	57,000	
*Non-conference game
