= 1921 Washington Sun Dodgers football team =

American college football season

1921 Washington Sun Dodgers football
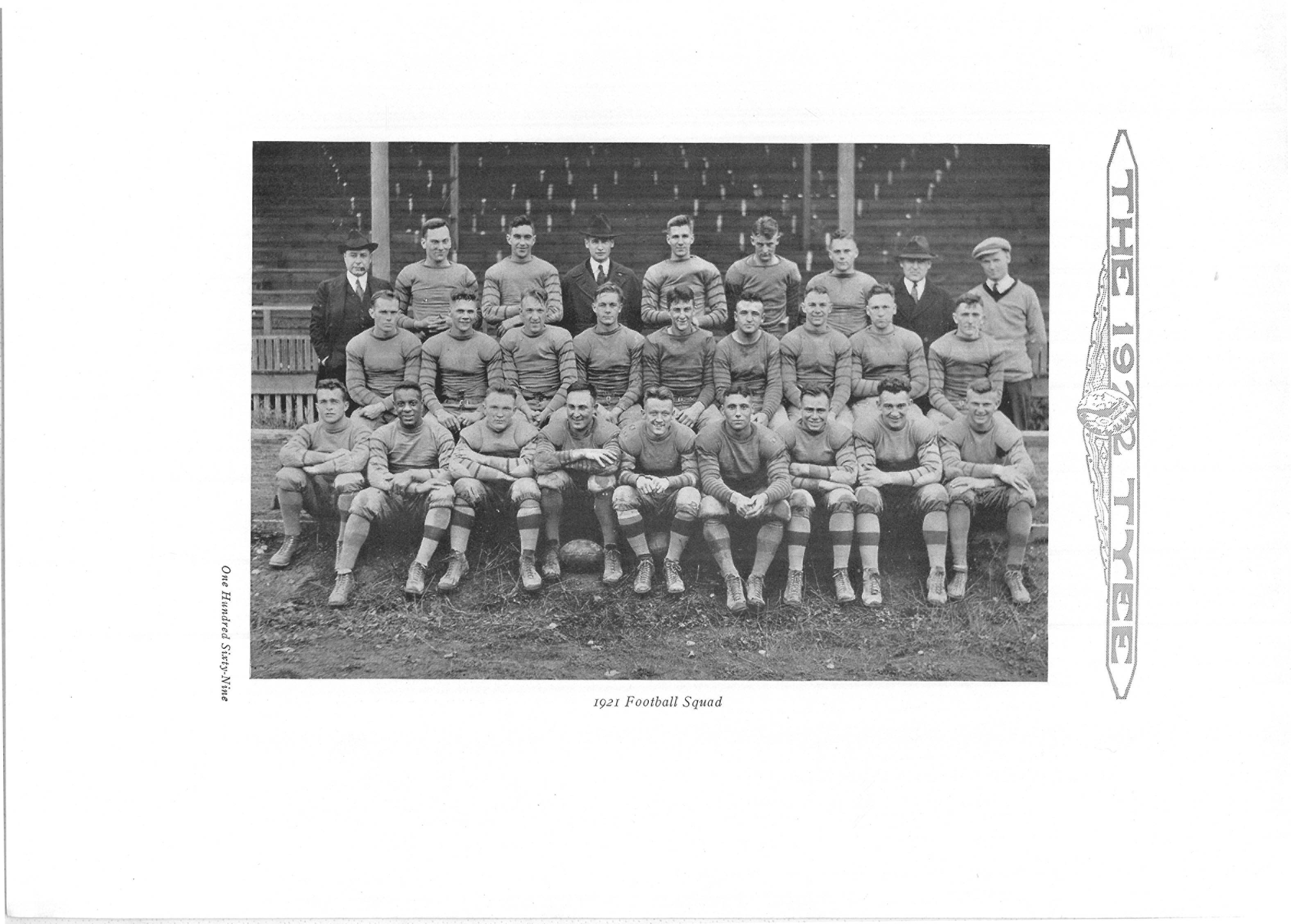
- Conference: Pacific Coast Conference
- Record: 3–4–1 (0–3–1 PCC)
- Head coach: Enoch Bagshaw (1st season)
- Captain: Ray Eckmann
- Home stadium: University of Washington Stadium

1921 Pacific Coast Conference football standings
	Conf.					Overall
Team	W		L		T	W		L		T
California $	4	–	0	–	0	9	–	0	–	1
Washington State	2	–	1	–	1	4	–	2	–	1
Stanford	1	–	1	–	1	4	–	2	–	2
Oregon Agricultural	1	–	2	–	1	4	–	3	–	2
Oregon	0	–	1	–	2	5	–	1	–	3
Washington	0	–	3	–	1	3	–	4	–	1
$ – Conference champion

The 1921 Washington Sun Dodgers football team was an American football team that represented the University of Washington during the 1921 college football season. In its first season under head coach Enoch Bagshaw, the team compiled a 3–4–1 record, finished in last place in the Pacific Coast Conference, and was outscored by its opponents by a combined total of 145 to 69. Ray Eckmann was the team captain.

== Schedule ==
Date	Opponent	Site	Result	Attendance	Source
October 1	Ninth Army Corps*	University of Washington Stadium; Seattle, WA	W 24–7	8,000	
October 8	Whitman*	University of Washington Stadium; Seattle, WA	W 7–0	6,760	
October 15	Montana*	University of Washington Stadium; Seattle, WA	W 28–7	6,033	
October 22	at Oregon Agricultural	Bell Field; Corvallis, OR	L 0–24	6,500	
November 5	Stanford	University of Washington Stadium; Seattle, WA	T 0–0	12,653	
November 12	at California	California Field; Berkeley, CA	L 3–72	6,000	
November 24	Washington State	University of Washington Stadium; Seattle, WA (rivalry)	L 0–14	15,000	
December 3	Penn State*	University of Washington Stadium; Seattle, WA	L 7–21	13,827	
*Non-conference game; Source:
