= 1921 Whitman Fighting Missionaries football team =

American college football season

1921 Whitman Fighting Missionaries football

Northwest Conference champion
- Conference: Northwest Conference
- Record: 4–2 (3–0 Northwest)
- Head coach: Vincent Borleske (6th season)
- Captain: Ben Comrada
- Home stadium: Ankeny Field

1921 Northwest Conference football standings
	Conf.					Overall
Team	W		L		T	W		L		T
Whitman $	3	–	0	–	0	4	–	2	–	0
Washington State	2	–	0	–	1	4	–	2	–	1
Oregon	1	–	0	–	3	5	–	1	–	3
Oregon Agricultural	1	–	1	–	1	4	–	3	–	2
Idaho	1	–	2	–	1	4	–	3	–	1
Montana	0	–	2	–	0	3	–	3	–	1
Willamette	0	–	3	–	0	1	–	5	–	0
$ – Conference champion

The 1921 Whitman Fighting Missionaries football team represented Whitman College as a member of the Northwest Conference during the 1921 college football season. Led by sixth-year head coach Vincent Borleske, the Fighting Missionaries compiled an overall record of 4–2 with a mark of 3–0 in conference play, winning the Northwest Conference. Ben Comrada, a graduate of Ballard High School in Seattle, played at tackle and was the team captain. Whitman played home games at Ankeny Field in Walla Walla, Washington.

== Schedule ==
Date	Time	Opponent	Site	Result	Attendance	Source
October 1	2:30 p.m.	at Multnomah Athletic Club*	Multnomah Field; Portland, OR	L 6–13	3,000	
October 8		at Washington*	Husky Stadium; Seattle, WA	L 0–7	6,760	
October 22		College of Idaho*	Ankeny Field; Walla Walla, WA	W 17–13		
October 29	2:00 p.m.	at Montana	Dornblaser Field; Missoula, MT	W 14–6	2,300	
November 11		Willamette^{†}	Ankeny Field; Walla Walla, WA	W 25–0		
November 24		Idaho	Ankeny Field; Walla Walla, WA	W 14–3		
*Non-conference game; ^{†}Homecoming; All times are in Pacific time; Source:
