= Stanley Barnes =

American judge (1900–1990)

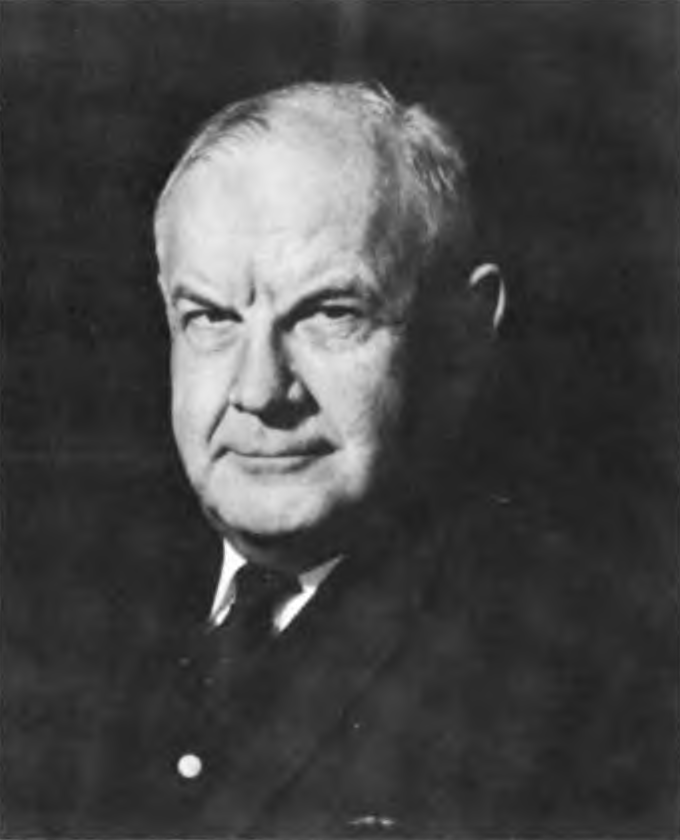

Senior Judge of the United States Court of Appeals for the Ninth Circuit
- In office October 31, 1970 – March 5, 1990

Judge of the United States Court of Appeals for the Ninth Circuit
- In office March 21, 1956 – October 31, 1970
- Appointed by: Dwight D. Eisenhower
- Preceded by: William Edwin Orr
- Succeeded by: Herbert Choy

Personal details
- Born: Stanley Nelson Barnes; May 1, 1900 Baraboo, Wisconsin, U.S.
- Died: March 5, 1990 (aged 89) Palm Springs, California, U.S.
- Resting place: San Gabriel Cemetery; San Gabriel, California
- Education: University of California, Berkeley (AB); UC Berkeley School of Law (JD)
- Football career

Profile
- Position: Center

Career information
- College: University of California

Awards and highlights
- 2× National champion (1920, 1921); 2× First-team All-PCC (1918, 1920)
- College Football Hall of Fame

Stanley Nelson Barnes (May 1, 1900 – March 5, 1990) was a noted American college football player, an assistant attorney general of the United States, and a United States circuit judge of the United States Court of Appeals for the Ninth Circuit.

== Early life and college football ==
Born on May 1, 1900, in Baraboo, Wisconsin, Barnes played high school football at San Diego High for Clarence "Nibs" Price, who encouraged his brightest players, starting with Barnes, to follow his path to Berkeley to play for the California Golden Bears under coach Andy Smith. Barnes was a center/tackle on California's "Wonder Teams" of 1920 and 1921. In his junior and senior seasons he played with the Bears in two consecutive Rose Bowls.

The 1920 California squad won the national championship going 9-0 outscoring its opponents 510 to 14. In one of the biggest routs in college football history, the Bears defeated St. Mary's 127–0. In the Rose Bowl, Cal defeated the Ohio State Buckeyes 28–0. California was also undefeated and untied in 1921 until the Bears tied Washington & Jefferson 0–0 on a muddy field in the Rose Bowl. During his four years at Berkeley, Barnes played on teams that won 31 lost four and tied two.

Barnes was elected to the College Football Hall of Fame in 1954 and was among the first group of inductees at the Cal Athletic Hall of Fame in 1986.

== Legal career ==
Barnes was in the United States Naval Reserve from 1918 to 1921. He received an Artium Baccalaureus degree from the University of California, Berkeley in 1922 and a Juris Doctor from UC Berkeley School of Law in 1925. Barnes also studied at Harvard Law School. He was in private practice in San Francisco, California from 1925 to 1928, and then in Los Angeles, California until 1947. He was a lecturer at the USC Gould School of Law and Medical School from 1947 to 1952. Barnes joined the California Republican Assembly, a grassroots political organization, and rose within its ranks to become one of the GOP's power-brokers in California. His friend from Berkeley, Earl Warren, remained a confidant and Barnes was a member of Warren's inner circle through his rise to governor. For his part, Barnes became a Superior Court Judge in Los Angeles. He was Presiding Judge of the Superior Court of the State of California for the County of Los Angeles from 1947 to 1953. Barnes was an Assistant United States Attorney General in Washington, D.C. in charge of the Antitrust Division from 1953 to 1956, and co-chaired the National Committee to Study Antitrust Laws.

== Federal judicial service ==
On March 5, 1956, Barnes was nominated by President Dwight D. Eisenhower to a seat on the United States Court of Appeals for the Ninth Circuit vacated by Judge William Edwin Orr. Barnes was confirmed by the United States Senate on March 20, 1956, and received his commission on March 21, 1956. He assumed senior status on October 31, 1970, serving in that capacity until his death on March 5, 1990. He was also President of the Federal Bar Association.

== Death ==
Barnes died at the age of 89 in Palm Springs, California. He was buried at San Gabriel Cemetery, in San Gabriel, California.

== Fraternal organization ==
Stanley Nelson Barnes was a member of the Sigma Chi fraternity. After service to Sigma Chi as an alumnus, he served as Sigma Chi's 37th Grand Consul (International President) from 1952 - 1955.

== Sources ==
Legal offices
Preceded by William Edwin Orr	Judge of the United States Court of Appeals for the Ninth Circuit; 1956–1970	Succeeded by Herbert Choy
