= 1921 All-Pacific Coast football team =

American all-star college football team

The 1921 All-Pacific Coast football team consists of American football players chosen by various organizations for All-Pacific Coast teams for the 1921 college football season.

== All-Pacific Coast selections ==
=== Quarterback ===
- Charles F. Erb, California (UP-1; GV-1) (unanimous pick by UP selectors)
- Robert Shlaudeman, Stanford (GV-2)

=== Halfbacks ===
- Charles F. Dean, USC (UP-1)
- Crip Toomey, California (UP-1; GV-1)
- Ray Eckmann, Washington (GV-1)
- Chapman, Oregon (GV-2)
- Donald Nichols, California (GV-2)

=== Fullback ===
- Archie Nisbet, California (UP-1; GV-1)
- Duke Morrison, California (GV-2)

=== Ends ===
- Howard Stephens, California (UP-1; GV-1) (unanimous pick by UP selectors)
- Robert A. Berkey, California (UP-1; GV-2)
- Vern Hickey, Washington State (GV-2)

=== Tackles ===
- Dan McMillan, California (UP-1; GV-1)
- Earl Leslie, Oregon (UP-1)
- Stanley Barnes, California (GV-1)
- Ford Dunton, Washington State (GV-2)
- Percy Locey, Oregon Agricultural (GV-2)

=== Guards ===
- Webster V. Clark, California (UP-1)
- Lee D. Cranmer, California (UP-1; GV-2)
- Dudley DeGroot, Stanford (GV-1)
- McKay, Washington State (GV-1)
- Emil Christensen, Oregon Agricultural (GV-2)

=== Centers ===
- Earl Dunlap, Washington State (UP-1; GV-1)
- George Latham, California (GV-2)

== Key ==
- UP = United Press, by the sporting editors of the leading Pacific coast newspapers, including the Oakland Tribune, Portland Journal, Seattle Star, Los Angeles Herald, Sacramento Star, San Francisco News, and Portland News
- GV = George Varnell, "Pacific Coast and Northern Conference referee and local sporting writer"

== See also ==
- 1921 College Football All-America Team
