= 1918 All-Pacific Coast football team =

American all-star college football team

The 1918 All-Pacific Coast football team consists of American football players chosen by various organizations for All-Pacific Coast teams for the 1918 college football season.

== All-Pacific Coast selections ==
=== Quarterback ===
- Ray Eckmann, Washington (SH-1)

=== Halfbacks ===
- Everett Brandenburg, Oregon (SH-1)
- Sproat, California (SH-1)

=== Fullback ===
- George Powell, Oregon Agricultural (SH-1)

=== Ends ===
- Howard, Oregon (SH-1)
- George Wilson, Oregon (SH-1)

=== Tackles ===
- Trowbridge, Oregon (SH-1)
- Olin Majors, California (SH-1)

=== Guards ===
- Mautz, Oregon (SH-1)
- Walter A. Gordon, California (SH-1)

=== Centers ===
- Stanley Barnes, California (SH-1)

== Key ==
SH = Shy Huntington, Oregon head coach

== See also ==
- 1918 College Football All-America Team
