= Brodie Stephens =

American football player and physician (1901–1983)

- Born: Howard Brodie Stephens; September 26, 1901
- Died: April 18, 1983 (aged 81); Santa Barbara, California, U.S.
- Occupation: physician
- Football career

Profile
- Position: End

Career information
- College: California (1920–1921)

Awards and highlights
- 2× National champion (1920, 1921); Third-team All-American (1921)

Howard Brodie Stephens (September 26, 1901 – April 18, 1983) was an American college football player and physician. He is perhaps best known as the one on the receiving end of the pass from Brick Muller in the 1921 Rose Bowl. He was selected All-American in 1921.
