= 1921 Willamette Bearcats football team =

American college football season

1921 Willamette Bearcats football
- Conference: Northwest Conference
- Record: 1–5 (0–3 Northwest)
- Head coach: Roy Bohler (1st season)
- Home stadium: Sweetland Field

1921 Northwest Conference football standings
| | Conf. | | | | | Overall |
| Team | W | | L | | T | W | | L | | T |
|---|---|---|---|---|---|---|---|---|---|---|
| Whitman $ | 3 | – | 0 | – | 0 | 4 | – | 2 | – | 0 |
| Washington State | 2 | – | 0 | – | 1 | 4 | – | 2 | – | 1 |
| Oregon | 1 | – | 0 | – | 3 | 5 | – | 1 | – | 3 |
| Oregon Agricultural | 1 | – | 1 | – | 1 | 4 | – | 3 | – | 2 |
| Idaho | 1 | – | 2 | – | 1 | 4 | – | 3 | – | 1 |
| Montana | 0 | – | 2 | – | 0 | 3 | – | 3 | – | 1 |
| Willamette | 0 | – | 3 | – | 0 | 1 | – | 5 | – | 0 |
$ – Conference champion

The 1921 Willamette Bearcats football team represented Willamette University as a member of the Northwest Conference during the 1921 college football season. Under first-year head coach Roy Bohler, the Bearcats compiled an overall record of 1–5 with a mark of 0–3 in conference play, and finished tied for sixth in the Northwest Conference.

== Schedule ==
| Date | Opponent | Site | Result | Source |
|---|---|---|---|---|
| October 1 | Oregon | Sweetland Field; Salem, OR | L 3–7 | |
| October 15 | Oregon Agricultural | Sweetland Field; Salem, OR | L 0–54 | |
| October 22 | Chemawa* | Sweetland Field; Salem, OR | W 14–7 | |
| November 5 | Pacific (OR)* | Sweetland Field; Salem, OR | L 10–27 | |
| November 11 | at Whitman | Ankeny Field; Walla Walla, WA | L 0–25 | |
| November 24 | at Puget Sound* | Tacoma Stadium; Tacoma, WA | L 7–18 | |
*Non-conference game
