= Gap Powell =

American football player (1898–1989)

Oregon State Beavers
- Position: Fullback

Personal information
- Born: March 18, 1898; Portland, Oregon
- Died: January 2, 1989 (aged 90); Long Beach, California

Career information
- High school: Franklin

George A. "Gap" Powell (March 18, 1898 – January 2, 1989) was an American football player.

== Early life ==
Powell grew up in Portland, Oregon and was one of the first 12 students to graduate from Franklin High School.

== Football career ==
He played fullback for Oregon State from 1918 to 1921 and became the university's first college football All-American in 1921. In the January 1922 issue of "Football World," Powell was named as the first-team All-American at the fullback position. Powell was also a member of Oregon State's track team and won the Pacific Coast Conference shot put championship in 1920. He was inducted into the Oregon Sports Hall of Fame in 1982 and the Oregon State University Sports Hall of Fame in 1990.

== Business career ==
After graduating from Oregon State in 1922 with a degree in business administration, Powell moved to Southern California where he went into the oil business. In 1922, he brought Richfield products to Long Beach, California, for the first time. He also ran a depot and a service station in Long Beach. He remained in the business that he called "the oil and gas game" for his entire career. He also formed a company, G.A. Powell Co., that was a distributor for Rio Grande products. In addition to his business interests, Powell was an active recruiter for Oregon State in Southern California and became known as "Mister Oregon State" in Southern California.

Powell died in Long Beach in 1989 at the age of 90.

== See also ==
- 1921 College Football All-America Team
