= 1920 All-Pacific Coast football team =

American all-star college football team

The 1920 All-Pacific Coast football team consists of American football players chosen by various organizations for All-Pacific Coast teams for the 1920 college football season.

== All-Pacific Coast selections ==
=== Quarterback ===
- Bill Steers, Oregon (ODJ-1, GV-1)
- Charles F. Erb, California (AS-1, GV-2)

=== Halfbacks ===
- Pesky Sprott, California (AS-1, ODJ-1, GV-1)
- Dink Templeton, Stanford (ODJ-1, GV-1)
- Crip Toomey, California (AS-1, GV-2)
- Ray Eckmann, Washington (GV-2)

=== Fullback ===
- Lloyd Gillis, Washington State (ODJ-1, GV-1)
- Jesse B. Morrison, California (AS-1)
- Joe Kasberger, Oregon Agricultural (GV-2)

=== Ends ===
- Harold Muller, California (AS-1, ODJ-1, GV-1)
- Robert A. Berkey, California (AS-1, GV-1)
- Martin Howard, Oregon (ODJ-1)
- Chuck Rose, Oregon Agricultural (GV-2)
- Ted Faulk, Washington (GV-2)

=== Tackles ===
- Fred Hamilton, Washington State (ODJ-1, GV-1)
- Dan McMillan, California (AS-1, GV-1)
- Stanley Barnes, California (AS-1)
- Earl Leslie, Oregon (ODJ-1, GV-1)
- Clark, Washington (GV-2)
- Pershing, Stanford (SDC-2)

=== Guards ===
- Olin C. Majors, California (AS-1, ODJ-1, GV-1)
- Lee D. Cranmer, California (AS-1, GV-2)
- Carl Mautz, Oregon (ODJ-1, GV-2)

=== Centers ===
- Earl Dunlap, Washington State (ODJ-1, GV-1)
- George H. Latham, California (AS-1)
- George Smith, Washington (GV-2)

== Key ==
AS = Andy Smith, head coach of California, picking all 11 first-team players from his own squad

ODJ = Oregon Daily Journal

GV = George Varnell, "Pacific Coast and Northern Conference referee and local sporting writer"

== See also ==
- 1920 College Football All-America Team
