= List of All-Pac-12 Conference football teams =

The All-Pac-12 football team is an annual Pac-12 Conference honor bestowed on the best players in the conference following every college football season. Pac-12 coaches select first and second teams that each typically consists of 11 offensive players (a quarterback, two running backs, two wide receivers, a tight end, and five offensive linemen), 11 defensive players (four defensive linemen, three linebackers, and four defensive backs), and four specialists (a punter, a kicker, a return specialist, and a special teams player). Ties result in additional players being selected. Votes are based on a weighted ranking, and coaches are allowed to select players from their own team. Players placed on the first team are given an award by the conference, while those on the second team receive a certificate. Players that are not named all-conference may receive honorable mention if they received at least two votes. The preliminary results are then given to the coaches, who may choose to name as many as two additional players from their respective program for honorable mention from the conference.

The conference was founded as the Pacific Coast Conference (PCC), in 1915, which principal members founded the Athletic Association of Western Universities (AAWU) in 1959, and subsequently went by the names Pacific-8, Pacific-10, becoming the Pac-12 in 2011.

== Seasons ==
Following is a list of all-conference teams in the history of the Pac-12:

- 1916 All-Pacific Coast football team
- 1919 All-Pacific Coast football team
- 1920 All-Pacific Coast football team
- 1921 All-Pacific Coast football team
- 1922 All-Pacific Coast football team
- 1923 All-Pacific Coast football team
- 1924 All-Pacific Coast football team
- 1925 All-Pacific Coast football team
- 1926 All-Pacific Coast football team
- 1927 All-Pacific Coast football team
- 1928 All-Pacific Coast football team
- 1929 All-Pacific Coast football team
- 1930 All-Pacific Coast football team
- 1931 All-Pacific Coast football team
- 1932 All-Pacific Coast football team
- 1933 All-Pacific Coast football team
- 1934 All-Pacific Coast football team
- 1935 All-Pacific Coast football team
- 1936 All-Pacific Coast football team
- 1937 All-Pacific Coast football team
- 1938 All-Pacific Coast football team
- 1939 All-Pacific Coast football team
- 1940 All-Pacific Coast Conference football team
- 1941 All-Pacific Coast Conference football team
- 1942 All-Pacific Coast football team
- 1943 All-Pacific Coast football team
- 1944 All-Pacific Coast football team
- 1945 All-Pacific Coast football team
- 1946 All-Pacific Coast football team
- 1947 All-Pacific Coast Conference football team
- 1948 All-Pacific Coast Conference football team
- 1949 All-Pacific Coast Conference football team
- 1950 All-Pacific Coast Conference football team
- 1951 All-Pacific Coast Conference football team
- 1952 All-Pacific Coast Conference football team
- 1953 All-Pacific Coast Conference football team
- 1954 All-Pacific Coast Conference football team
- 1955 All-Pacific Coast Conference football team
- 1956 All-Pacific Coast Conference football team
- 1957 All-Pacific Coast Conference football team
- 1958 All-Pacific Coast Conference football team
- 1959 All-Pacific Coast football team
- 1960 All-Pacific Coast football team
- 1961 All-Pacific Coast football team
- 1962 All-Pacific Coast football team
- 1963 All-Pacific Coast football team
- 1964 All-Pacific Athletic Conference football team
- 1965 All-Pacific Athletic Conference football team
- 1966 All-Pacific-8 Conference football team
- 1967 All-Pacific-8 Conference football team
- 1968 All-Pacific-8 Conference football team
- 1969 All-Pacific-8 Conference football team
- 1970 All-Pacific-8 Conference football team
- 1971 All-Pacific-8 Conference football team
- 1972 All-Pacific-8 Conference football team
- 1973 All-Pacific-8 Conference football team
- 1974 All-Pacific-8 Conference football team
- 1975 All-Pacific-8 Conference football team
- 1976 All-Pacific-8 Conference football team
- 1977 All-Pacific-8 Conference football team
- 1978 All-Pacific-10 Conference football team
- 1979 All-Pacific-10 Conference football team
- 1980 All-Pacific-10 Conference football team
- 1981 All-Pacific-10 Conference football team
- 1982 All-Pacific-10 Conference football team
- 1983 All-Pacific-10 Conference football team
- 1984 All-Pacific-10 Conference football team
- 1985 All-Pacific-10 Conference football team
- 1986 All-Pacific-10 Conference football team
- 1987 All-Pacific-10 Conference football team
- 1988 All-Pacific-10 Conference football team
- 1989 All-Pacific-10 Conference football team
- 1990 All-Pacific-10 Conference football team
- 1991 All-Pacific-10 Conference football team
- 1992 All-Pacific-10 Conference football team
- 1993 All-Pacific-10 Conference football team
- 1994 All-Pacific-10 Conference football team
- 1995 All-Pacific-10 Conference football team
- 1996 All-Pacific-10 Conference football team
- 1997 All-Pacific-10 Conference football team
- 1998 All-Pacific-10 Conference football team
- 1999 All-Pacific-10 Conference football team
- 2000 All-Pacific-10 Conference football team
- 2001 All-Pacific-10 Conference football team
- 2002 All-Pacific-10 Conference football team
- 2003 All-Pacific-10 Conference football team
- 2004 All-Pacific-10 Conference football team
- 2005 All-Pacific-10 Conference football team
- 2006 All-Pacific-10 Conference football team
- 2007 All-Pacific-10 Conference football team
- 2008 All-Pacific-10 Conference football team
- 2009 All-Pacific-10 Conference football team
- 2010 All-Pacific-10 Conference football team
- 2011 All-Pac-12 Conference football team
- 2012 All-Pac-12 Conference football team
- 2013 All-Pac-12 Conference football team
- 2014 All-Pac-12 Conference football team
- 2015 All-Pac-12 Conference football team
- 2016 All-Pac-12 Conference football team
- 2017 All-Pac-12 Conference football team
- 2018 All-Pac-12 Conference football team
- 2019 All-Pac-12 Conference football team
- 2020 All-Pac-12 Conference football team
- 2021 All-Pac-12 Conference football team
- 2022 All-Pac-12 Conference football team
- 2023 All-Pac-12 Conference football team

== See also ==
- College Football All-America Team
- Pac-12 Conference football individual awards
